= 2026 Ontario Tankard =

Canadian mens provincial curling championship

- Host city: Elmira, Ontario
- Arena: Woolwich Memorial Centre
- Dates: January 5–11
- Winner: Team King
- Curling club: Tillsonburg CC, Tillsonburg
- Skip: Jayden King
- Third: Dylan Niepage
- Second: Owen Henry
- Lead: Victor Pietrangelo
- Alternate: Cory Heggestad
- Finalist: Sam Mooibroek

The 2026 Food & Farm Care Men's Ontario Curling Championship, better known as the Ontario Tankard, the provincial men's curling championship for Southern Ontario, was held from January 5 to 11 at Woolwich Memorial Centre in Elmira, Ontario. The winning Jayden King rink represented Ontario at the 2026 Montana's Brier, Canada's national men's curling championship in St. John's, Newfoundland and Labrador. Despite the event being held in an Olympic year, it was still held in conjunction with the 2026 Ontario Women's Curling Championship, the provincial women's championship.

== Qualification process ==
Twelve teams qualified for the 2026 Ontario Tankard. The top eight southern Ontario teams on the Canada Team Ranking System as of December 1, 2025 qualified, as well as four teams from an open qualifier.

Qualification method	Berths	Qualifying team(s)
CTRS standings	8	Jayden King; Mark Kean; Sam Mooibroek; Scott Howard; Mike Fournier; Alex Champ; Daniel Hocevar; Jonathan Beuk
Open Qualifier	4	Weston Oryniak; Landan Rooney; Tyler MacTavish; Jordan McNamara

== Teams ==
The teams are listed as follows:

Skip	Third	Second	Lead	Alternate	Coach	Club
Jonathan Beuk	Pat Janssen	David Staples	Sean Harrison	Kibo Mulima	Maurice Wilson	Cataraqui G&CC, Kingston
Alex Champ	Ben Bevan	Stuart Leslie	Travis Ackroyd			Royal Canadian CC, Toronto
Mike Fournier	Charlie Richard	Punit Sthankiya	Graeme Robson			Whitby CC, Whitby
Daniel Hocevar	Zander Elmes	Joel Matthews	Daniel Del Conte		Alex Hocevar	Dundas Valley G&CC, Dundas
Scott Howard	Mat Camm	Jason Camm	Scott Chadwick	Adam Spencer		Navan CC, Navan, Ottawa
Mark Kean	Brady Lumley	Matthew Garner	Spencer Dunlop		Matthew Wilkinson	Woodstock CC, Woodstock
Jayden King	Dylan Niepage	Owen Henry	Victor Pietrangelo	Cory Heggestad		Tillsonburg CC, Tillsonburg
Tyler MacTavish	Owen Nicholls	Nathan Kim	Nate Thomas		Nathan Scott	KW Granite Club, Waterloo
Jordan McNamara	Colton Daly	Jacob Clarke	Brenden Laframboise	Samuel Steep		Rideau CC, Ottawa
Sam Mooibroek	Ryan Wiebe	Scott Mitchell	Nathan Steele	Wyatt Small	Jake Higgs	Whitby CC, Whitby
Weston Oryniak	Jacob Jones	Noah Garner	Matthew Abrams			High Park Club, Toronto
Landan Rooney	Connor Lawes	Robert Currie	Evan Lilly		Dave Rooney	CC of Collingwood, Collingwood

=== Map of teams ===
Ontario Tankard Teams

== Knockout Brackets ==
=== A Event ===
First Knockout	Qualifier 1
Jayden King	6
Jonathan Beuk	7	Jordan McNamara	4
Jordan McNamara	8	Jayden King	6
Scott Howard	5
Scott Howard	9
Mike Fournier	9	Mike Fournier	6
Weston Oryniak	8	Jayden King	7
Daniel Hocevar	4
Mark Kean	4
Daniel Hocevar	8	Daniel Hocevar	9
Tyler MacTavish	5	Daniel Hocevar	6
Sam Mooibroek	5
Sam Mooibroek	6
Alex Champ	6	Alex Champ	4
Landan Rooney	4

=== B Event ===
Second Knockout	Qualifier 2
Jonathan Beuk	8
Mike Fournier	9	Mike Fournier	2
Sam Mooibroek	8
Sam Mooibroek	6
Landan Rooney	2	Scott Howard	5
Mark Kean	9	Mark Kean	7
Scott Howard	8
Sam Mooibroek	9
Tyler MacTavish	6	Daniel Hocevar	4
Alex Champ	5	Tyler MacTavish	3
Weston Oryniak	7	Jordan McNamara	6
Jordan McNamara	9	Jordan McNamara	3
Daniel Hocevar	9

=== C Event ===
Third Knockout				Qualifier 3
		Jordan McNamara	4
Jonathan Beuk	6	Landan Rooney	8
Landan Rooney	7			Landan Rooney	6
				Scott Howard	7
		Tyler MacTavish	7
		Scott Howard	14

Third Knockout	Qualifier 4
Alex Champ	5
Daniel Hocevar	5
Mike Fournier	7
Mike Fournier	6	Mark Kean	11
Mark Kean	7
Weston Oryniak	5
Mark Kean	7

== Knockout Results ==
All draws are listed in Eastern Time (UTC−05:00).

=== Draw 2 ===
Monday, January 5, 2:00 pm

Sheet A	1	2	3	4	5	6	7	8	9	10	Final
Jonathan Beuk 🔨	0	1	0	3	0	1	0	2	0	0	7
Jordan McNamara	1	0	2	0	2	0	1	0	1	1	8

Sheet B	1	2	3	4	5	6	7	8	9	10	Final
Alex Champ	0	0	2	0	0	0	2	1	0	1	6
Landan Rooney 🔨	1	0	0	2	0	0	0	0	1	0	4

Sheet C	1	2	3	4	5	6	7	8	9	10	Final
Daniel Hocevar 🔨	1	0	2	1	1	0	2	1	0	X	8
Tyler MacTavish	0	2	0	0	0	1	0	0	2	X	5

Sheet D	1	2	3	4	5	6	7	8	9	10	Final
Mike Fournier	2	1	0	2	0	0	3	0	0	1	9
Weston Oryniak 🔨	0	0	4	0	2	1	0	1	0	0	8

=== Draw 4 ===
Tuesday, January 6, 9:00 am

Sheet A	1	2	3	4	5	6	7	8	9	10	Final
Scott Howard	0	0	3	0	2	0	1	0	0	3	9
Mike Fournier 🔨	1	0	0	2	0	1	0	1	1	0	6

Sheet B	1	2	3	4	5	6	7	8	9	10	Final
Jayden King 🔨	0	0	0	1	0	3	1	0	0	1	6
Jordan McNamara	0	0	1	0	1	0	0	1	1	0	4

Sheet C	1	2	3	4	5	6	7	8	9	10	Final
Sam Mooibroek	2	0	2	0	1	0	0	0	0	1	6
Alex Champ 🔨	0	2	0	0	0	0	1	1	0	0	4

Sheet D	1	2	3	4	5	6	7	8	9	10	Final
Mark Kean	0	0	0	2	0	0	2	0	0	X	4
Daniel Hocevar 🔨	1	1	2	0	2	1	0	1	1	X	9

=== Draw 6 ===
Tuesday, January 6, 7:00 pm

Sheet A	1	2	3	4	5	6	7	8	9	10	Final
Weston Oryniak 🔨	0	2	0	1	2	0	1	0	1	0	7
Jordan McNamara	1	0	1	0	0	3	0	3	0	1	9

Sheet B	1	2	3	4	5	6	7	8	9	10	Final
Tyler MacTavish	0	0	1	0	2	0	0	2	0	1	6
Alex Champ 🔨	2	1	0	1	0	1	0	0	0	0	5

Sheet C	1	2	3	4	5	6	7	8	9	10	Final
Landan Rooney	0	1	0	0	1	0	0	X	X	X	2
Mark Kean 🔨	2	0	1	1	0	2	3	X	X	X	9

Sheet D	1	2	3	4	5	6	7	8	9	10	Final
Jonathan Beuk	0	1	0	2	0	2	0	2	0	1	8
Mike Fournier 🔨	2	0	1	0	4	0	1	0	1	0	9

=== Draw 7 ===
Wednesday, January 7, 9:00 am

Sheet B	1	2	3	4	5	6	7	8	9	10	Final
Jonathan Beuk	2	1	0	0	1	1	0	1	0	0	6
Landan Rooney 🔨	0	0	1	1	0	0	2	0	2	1	7

Sheet D	1	2	3	4	5	6	7	8	9	10	Final
Tyler MacTavish 🔨	0	0	0	0	1	0	1	1	0	0	3
Jordan McNamara	2	0	0	0	0	1	0	0	2	1	6

=== Draw 8 ===
Wednesday, January 7, 2:00 pm

Sheet A	1	2	3	4	5	6	7	8	9	10	Final
Daniel Hocevar 🔨	1	1	0	2	0	0	0	1	0	1	6
Sam Mooibroek	0	0	1	0	2	0	1	0	1	0	5

Sheet C	1	2	3	4	5	6	7	8	9	10	Final
Jayden King	0	1	0	1	0	2	0	0	0	2	6
Scott Howard 🔨	1	0	1	0	1	0	1	0	1	0	5

=== Draw 9 ===
Wednesday, January 7, 7:00 pm

Sheet A	1	2	3	4	5	6	7	8	9	10	Final
Mike Fournier	0	0	1	0	0	1	0	0	X	X	2
Sam Mooibroek 🔨	0	2	0	1	2	0	2	1	X	X	8

Sheet B	1	2	3	4	5	6	7	8	9	10	11	Final
Mark Kean	0	0	3	0	0	0	0	2	0	2	0	7
Scott Howard 🔨	0	4	0	0	0	0	1	0	2	0	1	8

=== Draw 10 ===
Thursday, January 8, 9:00 am

Sheet B	1	2	3	4	5	6	7	8	9	10	Final
Weston Oryniak 🔨	0	0	0	1	0	2	0	0	2	X	5
Mark Kean	1	2	1	0	1	0	1	1	0	X	7

Sheet D	1	2	3	4	5	6	7	8	9	10	Final
Alex Champ	0	0	0	0	2	0	1	0	2	X	5
Mike Fournier 🔨	2	1	0	2	0	1	0	1	0	X	7

=== Draw 11 ===
Thursday, January 8, 2:00 pm

Sheet A	1	2	3	4	5	6	7	8	9	10	11	Final
Mike Fournier	0	0	2	0	0	1	0	2	0	1	0	6
Mark Kean 🔨	0	1	0	2	1	0	0	0	2	0	1	7

Sheet B	1	2	3	4	5	6	7	8	9	10	Final
Jayden King 🔨	1	0	0	3	1	0	0	0	2	X	7
Daniel Hocevar	0	2	0	0	0	2	0	0	0	X	4

=== Draw 12 ===
Thursday, January 8, 7:00 pm

Sheet A	1	2	3	4	5	6	7	8	9	10	Final
Jordan McNamara 🔨	1	0	1	0	1	0	0	X	X	X	3
Daniel Hocevar	0	3	0	4	0	2	0	X	X	X	9

Sheet C	1	2	3	4	5	6	7	8	9	10	Final
Sam Mooibroek	0	0	1	0	2	0	1	0	2	0	6
Scott Howard 🔨	0	1	0	1	0	1	0	1	0	1	5

=== Draw 13 ===
Friday, January 9, 9:00 am

Sheet A	1	2	3	4	5	6	7	8	9	10	Final
Jordan McNamara	0	2	0	1	0	0	0	1	0	X	4
Landan Rooney 🔨	1	0	1	0	1	1	1	0	3	X	8

Sheet D	1	2	3	4	5	6	7	8	9	10	Final
Tyler MacTavish 🔨	2	3	0	2	0	0	0	0	0	X	7
Scott Howard	0	0	2	0	1	2	3	2	4	X	14

=== Draw 14 ===
Friday, January 9, 2:00 pm

Sheet B	1	2	3	4	5	6	7	8	9	10	Final
Sam Mooibroek	0	1	0	2	0	1	0	0	5	X	9
Daniel Hocevar 🔨	2	0	1	0	0	0	0	1	0	X	4

=== Draw 15 ===
Friday, January 9, 7:00 pm

Sheet C	1	2	3	4	5	6	7	8	9	10	Final
Landan Rooney	1	0	2	0	2	0	0	0	1	0	6
Scott Howard 🔨	0	1	0	3	0	1	0	1	0	1	7

Sheet D	1	2	3	4	5	6	7	8	9	10	Final
Daniel Hocevar	0	2	0	2	0	0	0	1	0	X	5
Mark Kean 🔨	2	0	3	0	1	2	0	0	3	X	11

== Playoffs ==
Page playoff system
A	Jayden King	5
B	Sam Mooibroek	7
C1	Scott Howard	3
C2	Mark Kean	10

Semifinal
A	Jayden King	7
C2	Mark Kean	6

Final
B	Sam Mooibroek	6
A	Jayden King	9

=== A vs. B ===
Saturday, January 10, 2:00 pm

Sheet C	1	2	3	4	5	6	7	8	9	10	Final
Jayden King 🔨	0	2	2	0	0	0	0	1	0	0	5
Sam Mooibroek	2	0	0	0	1	3	0	0	0	1	7

=== C1 vs. C2 ===
Saturday, January 10, 9:00 am

Sheet B	1	2	3	4	5	6	7	8	9	10	Final
Scott Howard	0	1	0	0	1	0	1	0	X	X	3
Mark Kean 🔨	1	0	3	1	0	2	0	3	X	X	10

=== Semifinal ===
Saturday, January 10, 7:00 pm

Sheet B	1	2	3	4	5	6	7	8	9	10	Final
Jayden King 🔨	1	0	0	2	0	1	1	0	0	2	7
Mark Kean	0	2	1	0	1	0	0	2	0	0	6

=== Final ===
Sunday, January 26, 2:30 pm

Sheet C	1	2	3	4	5	6	7	8	9	10	Final
Sam Mooibroek 🔨	1	0	2	0	0	1	0	2	0	0	6
Jayden King	0	2	0	0	2	0	2	0	2	1	9

2026 Ontario Tankard

Jayden King
1st Ontario Provincial Championship title

== Qualification ==
=== Open Qualifier ===
December 12–14, Simcoe Curling Club, Simcoe

A Side				To Tankard
Jordan McNamara (Rideau)	7
Matthew Coady (Wiarton)	4	Jordan McNamara (Rideau)	5
Jordan Keon (Richmond Hill)	0	Jacob Lamb (Dundas Valley)	8
Jacob Lamb (Dundas Valley)	6			Jacob Lamb (Dundas Valley)	3
Christopher Inglis (Peterborough)	8			Weston Oryniak (High Park)	7
Jonathan Biemans (Ottawa Hunt)	4	Christopher Inglis (Peterborough)	5
Weston Oryniak (High Park)	9	Weston Oryniak (High Park)	6
Riley Fung-Ernst (Westmount)	3
Pat Ferris (Grimsby)	6
Ryan Mayville (Stroud)	7	Ryan Mayville (Stroud)	4
Brent Ross (Harriston)	7	Brent Ross (Harriston)	6
Scott Bailey (High Park)	5			Brent Ross (Harriston)	5
Tyler MacTavish (KW Granite)	6			Landan Rooney (Collingwood)	8
Evan MacDougall (Fergus)	5	Tyler MacTavish (KW Granite)	4
Landan Rooney (Collingwood)	6	Landan Rooney (Collingwood)	8
Les Brownson (Quinte)	1

B Side	To Tankard
Jacob Lamb (Dundas Valley)	1
Tyler MacTavish (KW Granite)	7
Jordan Keon (Richmond Hill)	5
Jordan Keon (Richmond Hill)	8	Tyler MacTavish (KW Granite)	6
Matthew Coady (Wiarton)	7	Tyler MacTavish (KW Granite)	11
Jonathan Biemans (Ottawa Hunt)	2
Jonathan Biemans (Ottawa Hunt)	4
Jonathan Biemans (Ottawa Hunt)	7	Ryan Mayville (Stroud)	3
Riley Fung-Ernst (Westmount)	4
Brent Ross (Harriston)	6
Jordan McNamara (Rideau)	8
Pat Ferris (Grimsby)	5
Scott Bailey (High Park)	2	Christopher Inglis (Peterborough)	4
Pat Ferris (Grimsby)	6	Pat Ferris (Grimsby)	5
Jordan McNamara (Rideau)	6
Evan MacDougall (Fergus)	3
Evan MacDougall (Fergus)	6	Jordan McNamara (Rideau)	9
Les Brownson (Quinte)	4
