= Dylan Niepage =

Canadian curler (born 2001)

- Curler
- Born: August 2, 2001 (age 25); Barrie, Ontario

Team
- Curling club: Tillsonburg CC, Tillsonburg, ON
- Skip: Jayden King
- Third: Dylan Niepage
- Second: Owen Henry
- Lead: Victor Pietrangelo
- Mixed doubles partner: Megan Smith

Curling career
- Member Association: Ontario
- Brier: 1 (2026)
- Top CTRS ranking: 7th (2025–26)

Dylan Niepage (born August 2, 2001, in Barrie) is a Canadian curler from Oro-Medonte, Ontario. He currently plays third on Team Jayden King.

== Career ==
=== Juniors ===
Niepage skipped his team of Sam Hastings, Cameron Vanbodegom and Trey Cowell to victory at the 2019 U18 Ontario Curling Championships, qualifying them for the 2019 Canadian U18 Curling Championships in Sherwood Park. There, the team finished 6–2 through the round robin and knockout stages to qualify for the playoffs. They then beat Manitoba in the semifinals before beating British Columbia to claim the gold medal. The following year, Niepage skipped the University of Guelph at the 2020 U Sports/Curling Canada University Curling Championships after qualifying through the Ontario University Athletics championships. The team narrowly advanced to the playoffs with a 3–4 record before losing both the semifinal and bronze medal game, settling for fourth. Also in 2020, Niepage won the Ontario Winter Games.

For the 2021–22 season, Niepage formed a new team with Gavin Lydiate, Jayden King and Daniel Del Conte that had profound success. In August, the team went undefeated to win the Oakville Under 25 Kick-off, their first victory on the men's tour. They also advanced through the first cashspiel qualifier of the 2022 Ontario Tankard to qualify for their first provincial men's championship. There, they reached the B semifinals before dropping back-to-back games to Scott Howard and Tanner Horgan, eliminating them from contention. At the Ontario U20 Curling Championships, the team dropped the first final to Landan Rooney, however, defeated Christopher Inglis in the second final to earn the right to compete at the 2022 Canadian Junior Curling Championships as Ontario 2. At the championship, the team finished 4–4 in the round robin, not enough to advance to the playoffs.

The following season, King and Del Conte left the team and were replaced by Kibo Mulima and Riley Fung-Ernst. This team reached the playoffs at two men's events, however, lost in the quarterfinal round at both. At the junior provincial, they failed to advance to the 2023 Canadian Junior Curling Championships after losing the second final to Landan Rooney.

=== Men's ===
Out of juniors, Niepage and Lydiate reunited with King and Del Conte, however, with King taking over as skip and Niepage playing third. On the men's tour, the team saw immediate success, winning the Capital Curling Fall Open and reaching the final of the Stroud Sleeman Cash Spiel. They also made it to the semifinals of the Summer Series and the quarterfinals of the 2023 KW Fall Classic and 2023 Stu Sells Tankard. With their points accumulated on the Ontario tour, the team was able to directly qualify for the 2024 Ontario Tankard. There, Team King lost in the A and B brackets to Sam Mooibroek but bounced back to qualify for the playoffs through the C event. In the playoffs, Team King then scored upset victories over Pat Ferris and John Epping to qualify for the provincial final. Facing Scott Howard, the team lost 8–7 in an extra end, finishing second. To end the season, Team King represented the University of Guelph at the 2024 U Sports/Curling Canada University Curling Championships after finishing third at the OUA championship. There, they had a disappointing 3–4 sixth-place finish. After the season, Gavin Lydiate left the team and was replaced by Owen Henry.

To start the 2024–25 season, Team King finished runner-up at the U25 NextGen Classic to Jordon McDonald. On tour, they continued to find steady success, though they did not win any event titles. Their best result came at the Stu Sells Port Elgin Superspiel where they lost in the final to Korea's Park Jong-duk. In the new year, the team qualified for the 2025 Ontario Tankard through CTRS points. After finishing runner-up the year before, the team was not able to replicate their success, finishing 3–3 and failing to advance to the playoff round. For the following season, Daniel Del Conte was replaced by Victor Pietrangelo.

The 2025–26 season marked Team King's best season to date as they climbed to seventh on the CTRS rankings and qualified in all but one event they played. To begin, the team competed in the 2025 U25 NextGen Classic where they were again eliminated by Jordon McDonald, this time in the semifinals. They then played in the 2025 KW Fall Classic where they had an undefeated run up until the final where they lost to Italy's Joël Retornaz. The team then had a pair of quarterfinal losses at the 2025 Masters Tier 2 Grand Slam event and 2025 Stu Sells Toronto Tankard, falling to Daniel Casper and Magnus Ramsfjell respectively. In October, the team participated in the 2025 Canadian Olympic Curling Pre-Trials, qualifying as the eighth seeds after Team Reid Carruthers declined their invitation. There, the team had an impressive showing, going 4–3 and just missing the playoffs. They bounced back with back-to-back finals appearances at the Broken Broom Tobacco Belt Cash Spiel and Stu Sells Living Waters Collingwood Classic, losing to Mark Kean and Scott Howard. In January, the team played in the 2026 Ontario Tankard where they entered as the top seeds. After qualifying for the playoffs through the A bracket, they lost the 1 vs. 2 game to Sam Mooibroek. They then beat Mark Kean in the semifinal to set up a rematch against Mooibroek in the final. Tied in the ninth end, the team scored two points before stealing in the tenth end to win the game 9–6, capturing the Ontario Tankard title and sending them to the 2026 Montana's Brier in St. John's, Newfoundland and Labrador. At the Brier, Team King finished the round robin with a 5–3 record, enough to qualify for the championship round. They then lost to Brad Gushue 12–6 in the page qualifier and were eliminated.

== Personal life ==
Niepage is employed as an intermediate accountant at BDO Canada LLP. He previously attended the University of Guelph. Niepage was born profoundly deaf and uses cochlear implants to hear.

== Teams ==
| Season | Skip | Third | Second | Lead |
|---|---|---|---|---|
| 2016–17 | Evan Running | Dylan Niepage | Cameron Vanbodegom | Trey Cowell |
| 2017–18 | Evan Running | Dylan Niepage | Cameron Vanbodegom | Trey Cowell |
| 2018–19 | Dylan Niepage | Sam Hastings | Cameron Vanbodegom | Trey Cowell |
| 2019–20 | Dylan Niepage | Nathan Marshall | Samuel Guilbeault | Ryan Yee |
| 2021–22 | Dylan Niepage | Gavin Lydiate | Jayden King | Daniel Del Conte |
| 2022–23 | Dylan Niepage | Kibo Mulima | Gavin Lydiate | Riley Fung-Ernst |
| 2023–24 | Jayden King | Dylan Niepage | Gavin Lydiate | Daniel Del Conte |
| 2024–25 | Jayden King | Dylan Niepage | Owen Henry | Daniel Del Conte |
| 2025–26 | Jayden King | Dylan Niepage | Owen Henry | Victor Pietrangelo |
| 2026–27 | Jayden King | Dylan Niepage | Owen Henry | Victor Pietrangelo |
