= 2024 Ontario Tankard =

Canadian mens provincial curling championship

- Host city: Dorchester, Ontario
- Arena: FlightExec Centre
- Dates: January 24–28
- Winner: Team Howard
- Curling club: Penetanguishene CC, Penetanguishene
- Skip: Scott Howard
- Second: David Mathers
- Lead: Tim March
- Alternate: Glenn Howard (Note: Team Howard played with three players.)
- Finalist: Jayden King

The 2024 Ontario Tankard, the provincial men's curling championship for Southern Ontario, was held from January 24 to 28 at FlightExec Centre in Dorchester, Ontario. The winning Scott Howard rink represented Ontario at the 2024 Montana's Brier, Canada's national men's curling championship in Regina, Saskatchewan. The event was held in conjunction with the 2024 Ontario Scotties Tournament of Hearts, the provincial women's curling championship. Both events are held together in non-Winter Olympic years.

The Municipality of Thames Centre provided $10,000 of seed money to host the event, which is expected to attract 18,000 too 20,000 visitors.

When Jayden King and Kibo Mulima played against each other in the C event, it marked the first time that two Black skips faced off against each other at the provincial championship.

== Qualification process ==
Twelve teams qualified for the 2024 Ontario Tankard. The top four southern Ontario teams on the Canada Team Ranking System as of December 18, 2023 qualified, as well as the next four teams based on points accumulated in Ontario only events (St. Catharines Golf & CC Cash Spiel, Stu Sells Oakville Tankard, KW Fall Classic, AMJ Campbell Shorty Jenkins Classic, Capital Curling Fall Open, Stu Sells Tankard, Capital Curling Classic, Players Open, Stroud Sleeman Cash Spiel, Capital Curling Valley Open, Comco Cash Spiel, Stu Sells Port Elgin Superspiel, Stu Sells Living Waters Collingwood Classic, Stu Sells Brantford Nissan Classic). The remaining four teams qualify from an open qualifier.

Qualification method	Berths	Qualifying team(s)
CTRS Overall	4	Sam Mooibroek; John Epping; Glenn Howard; Pat Ferris
CTRS Ontario only	4	Mark Kean; Mike Fournier; Jayden King; Alex Champ
Open Qualifier	4	Kibo Mulima; Travis Fanset; Christopher Inglis (Note: In the Open Qualifier, Team Inglis was skipped by Nathan Lohnes, however, in the Ontario Tankard, the skip was Christopher Inglis); Greg Balsdon

== Teams ==
The teams are listed as follows:

Skip	Third	Second	Lead	Alternate	Club
Greg Balsdon	Jordan Keon	Curtis Samoy	Trevor Talbott	Mike Anderson	Richmond Hill CC, Richmond Hill
Alex Champ	Charlie Richard	Austin Snyder	Scott Clinton	Jess Bechard	Highland Community CC, London
John Epping	Mat Camm	Pat Janssen	Jason Camm	Aaron Squires	Leaside CC, East York, Toronto
Travis Fanset	Brandon Tippin	Chad Allen	Mike Walsh	Edwin Knox Cleaves	Tillsonburg CC, Tillsonburg
Pat Ferris	Landan Rooney	Connor Duhaime	Robert Currie	Evan Lilly	Grimsby CC, Grimsby
Mike Fournier	Kevin Flewwelling	Sean Harrison	Zander Elmes		Leaside CC, East York, Toronto
Scott Howard	David Mathers	Tim March	– (Note: Team Howard played with three players.)	Glenn Howard	Penetanguishene CC, Penetanguishene
Mark Kean	Brady Lumley	Matthew Garner	Spencer Dunlop	John Gabel	Oakville CC, Oakville
Jayden King	Dylan Niepage	Gavin Lydiate	Daniel Del Conte		London CC, London
Jacob Jones (Fourth)	Christopher Inglis (Skip)	Nathan Lohnes	Liam Little		Dundas Valley G&CC, Dundas, Hamilton
Sam Mooibroek	Scott Mitchell	Nathan Steele	Colin Schnurr	Wyatt Small	Whitby CC, Whitby
Kibo Mulima	Owen Henry	Kyle Stratton	Matt Duizer	Benjamin Pearce	Guelph CC, Guelph

=== Map of teams ===
Ontario Tankard Teams

== Knockout brackets ==
=== A Event ===
First Knockout	Qualifier 1
Sam Mooibroek	9
Jayden King	5	Jayden King	3
Travis Fanset	3	Sam Mooibroek	10
Mike Fournier	3
Pat Ferris	4
Christopher Inglis	6	Mike Fournier	7
Mike Fournier	9	Sam Mooibroek	7
Team Howard	11
Team Howard	5
Greg Balsdon	4	Mark Kean	2
Mark Kean	7	Team Howard	6
John Epping	5
John Epping	8
Kibo Mulima	7	Alex Champ	4
Alex Champ	8

=== B Event ===
Second Knockout	Qualifier 2
Travis Fanset	7
Pat Ferris	8	Pat Ferris	7
John Epping	10
John Epping	8
Kibo Mulima	6	Mark Kean	3
Mark Kean	7	Mark Kean	9
Mike Fournier	2
John Epping	9
Greg Balsdon	8	Sam Mooibroek	8
Alex Champ	3	Greg Balsdon	5
Christopher Inglis	3	Jayden King	7
Jayden King	9	Jayden King	3
Sam Mooibroek	8

=== C Event ===
Third Knockout				Qualifier 3
		Jayden King	11
Travis Fanset	7	Kibo Mulima	5
Kibo Mulima	8			Jayden King	10
				Mark Kean	9
		Greg Balsdon	4
		Mark Kean	5

Third Knockout				Qualifier 4
Alex Champ	9
Pat Ferris	11	Pat Ferris	11
Christopher Inglis	4	Mike Fournier	5
Mike Fournier	7			Pat Ferris	9
				Sam Mooibroek	6

== Knockout results ==
All draws are listed in Eastern Time (UTC−05:00).

=== Draw 7 ===
Wednesday, January 24, 7:30 pm

Sheet A	1	2	3	4	5	6	7	8	9	10	Final
Jayden King 🔨	0	1	0	1	1	2	0	0	0	X	5
Travis Fanset	0	0	0	0	0	0	2	1	0	X	3

Sheet B	1	2	3	4	5	6	7	8	9	10	Final
Christopher Inglis	2	0	0	0	0	0	2	0	2	0	6
Mike Fournier 🔨	0	1	1	2	1	2	0	1	0	1	9

Sheet C	1	2	3	4	5	6	7	8	9	10	Final
Greg Balsdon 🔨	2	0	0	1	0	1	0	0	0	0	4
Mark Kean	0	0	2	0	1	0	0	2	0	2	7

Sheet D	1	2	3	4	5	6	7	8	9	10	11	Final
Kibo Mulima 🔨	1	0	2	0	1	0	2	0	1	0	0	7
Alex Champ	0	2	0	0	0	3	0	1	0	1	1	8

=== Draw 8 ===
Thursday, January 25, 9:30 am

Sheet C	1	2	3	4	5	6	7	8	9	10	Final
Sam Mooibroek 🔨	3	0	0	3	0	2	1	X	X	X	9
Jayden King	0	1	1	0	1	0	0	X	X	X	3

Sheet D	1	2	3	4	5	6	7	8	9	10	Final
Pat Ferris	1	0	0	0	2	0	1	X	X	X	4
Mike Fournier 🔨	0	2	1	2	0	2	0	X	X	X	7

=== Draw 9 ===
Thursday, January 25, 2:30 pm

Sheet B	1	2	3	4	5	6	7	8	9	10	Final
John Epping 🔨	2	1	1	0	1	0	1	0	2	X	8
Alex Champ	0	0	0	1	0	2	0	1	0	X	4

Sheet E	1	2	3	4	5	6	7	8	9	10	Final
Team Howard 🔨	0	0	0	3	0	0	1	0	1	X	5
Mark Kean	0	0	0	0	1	0	0	1	0	X	2

=== Draw 10 ===
Thursday, January 25, 7:30 pm

Sheet A	1	2	3	4	5	6	7	8	9	10	Final
Greg Balsdon 🔨	0	1	1	0	0	2	0	1	3	X	8
Alex Champ	1	0	0	1	0	0	1	0	0	X	3

Sheet B	1	2	3	4	5	6	7	8	9	10	Final
Kibo Mulima	2	0	0	1	2	0	1	0	0	0	6
Mark Kean 🔨	0	2	0	0	0	1	0	2	0	2	7

Sheet C	1	2	3	4	5	6	7	8	9	10	Final
Travis Fanset	0	1	1	0	2	0	1	0	1	1	7
Pat Ferris 🔨	1	0	0	2	0	2	0	3	0	0	8

Sheet D	1	2	3	4	5	6	7	8	9	10	Final
Christopher Inglis	0	0	1	0	0	0	2	0	0	X	3
Jayden King 🔨	1	1	0	1	1	1	0	1	3	X	9

=== Draw 11 ===
Friday, January 26, 8:00 am

Sheet B	1	2	3	4	5	6	7	8	9	10	Final
Sam Mooibroek 🔨	6	0	2	1	1	0	X	X	X	X	10
Mike Fournier	0	2	0	0	0	1	X	X	X	X	3

Sheet C	1	2	3	4	5	6	7	8	9	10	Final
Team Howard	0	1	0	2	0	1	1	0	0	1	6
John Epping 🔨	0	0	1	0	2	0	0	1	1	0	5

Sheet E	1	2	3	4	5	6	7	8	9	10	11	Final
Travis Fanset 🔨	0	1	2	0	0	1	1	0	2	0	0	7
Kibo Mulima	2	0	0	0	2	0	0	2	0	1	1	8

=== Draw 12 ===
Friday, January 26, 12:15 pm

Sheet A	1	2	3	4	5	6	7	8	9	10	Final
Mark Kean 🔨	0	0	2	1	0	4	2	X	X	X	9
Mike Fournier	0	0	0	0	2	0	0	X	X	X	2

Sheet B	1	2	3	4	5	6	7	8	9	10	Final
Pat Ferris	0	2	0	1	0	2	0	0	2	0	7
John Epping 🔨	2	0	1	0	2	0	1	1	0	3	10

Sheet D	1	2	3	4	5	6	7	8	9	10	Final
Sam Mooibroek	0	1	3	0	2	0	0	1	0	X	7
Team Howard 🔨	2	0	0	2	0	1	3	0	3	X	11

Sheet E	1	2	3	4	5	6	7	8	9	10	Final
Greg Balsdon 🔨	2	0	0	0	1	0	1	0	1	0	5
Jayden King	0	2	0	1	0	1	0	2	0	1	7

=== Draw 13 ===
Friday, January 26, 4:30 pm

Sheet A	1	2	3	4	5	6	7	8	9	10	Final
Jayden King	0	1	0	1	0	0	1	0	X	X	3
Sam Mooibroek 🔨	4	0	1	0	0	1	0	2	X	X	8

Sheet B	1	2	3	4	5	6	7	8	9	10	Final
Christopher Inglis	0	0	1	0	0	0	2	0	1	X	4
Mike Fournier 🔨	0	3	0	1	1	1	0	1	0	X	7

Sheet D	1	2	3	4	5	6	7	8	9	10	Final
John Epping 🔨	0	0	1	0	1	1	0	3	0	2	8
Mark Kean	1	1	0	0	0	0	1	0	0	0	3

Sheet E	1	2	3	4	5	6	7	8	9	10	Final
Alex Champ 🔨	3	2	0	2	0	1	0	1	0	X	9
Pat Ferris	0	0	4	0	1	0	4	0	2	X	11

=== Draw 15 ===
Saturday, January 27, 9:30 am

Sheet A	1	2	3	4	5	6	7	8	9	10	Final
Greg Balsdon	1	0	0	0	0	0	2	0	1	0	4
Mark Kean 🔨	0	0	0	0	1	1	0	2	0	1	5

Sheet B	1	2	3	4	5	6	7	8	9	10	Final
Jayden King 🔨	4	0	2	0	3	0	2	X	X	X	11
Kibo Mulima	0	1	0	1	0	3	0	X	X	X	5

Sheet D	1	2	3	4	5	6	7	8	9	10	11	Final
John Epping 🔨	0	2	0	0	0	3	0	0	3	0	1	9
Sam Mooibroek	0	0	2	0	1	0	1	2	0	2	0	8

Sheet E	1	2	3	4	5	6	7	8	9	10	Final
Pat Ferris 🔨	0	3	3	0	0	3	0	2	X	X	11
Mike Fournier	0	0	0	1	3	0	1	0	X	X	5

=== Draw 16 ===
Saturday, January 27, 3:00 pm

Sheet B	1	2	3	4	5	6	7	8	9	10	Final
Pat Ferris	1	3	0	0	1	0	0	0	1	3	9
Sam Mooibroek 🔨	0	0	2	1	0	2	0	1	0	0	6

Sheet D	1	2	3	4	5	6	7	8	9	10	11	Final
Jayden King	0	1	0	0	2	0	2	0	0	4	1	10
Mark Kean 🔨	0	0	2	2	0	2	0	1	2	0	0	9

== Playoffs ==
Page playoff system
A	Team Howard	7
B	John Epping	1
C1	Jayden King	10
C2	Pat Ferris	5

Semifinal
B	John Epping	4
C1	Jayden King	7

Final
A	Team Howard	8
C1	Jayden King	7

=== A vs. B ===
Saturday, January 27, 8:00 pm

Sheet C	1	2	3	4	5	6	7	8	9	10	Final
Team Howard 🔨	0	3	1	1	1	1	0	X	X	X	7
John Epping	0	0	0	0	0	0	1	X	X	X	1

=== C1 vs. C2 ===
Saturday, January 27, 8:00 pm

Sheet D	1	2	3	4	5	6	7	8	9	10	Final
Jayden King	0	0	2	0	0	3	2	0	3	X	10
Pat Ferris 🔨	1	0	0	0	1	0	0	3	0	X	5

=== Semifinal ===
Sunday, January 28, 10:30 am

Sheet C	1	2	3	4	5	6	7	8	9	10	Final
John Epping 🔨	0	0	1	0	0	1	0	0	2	0	4
Jayden King	1	0	0	0	2	0	1	0	0	3	7

=== Final ===
Sunday, January 28, 3:00 pm

Sheet C	1	2	3	4	5	6	7	8	9	10	11	Final
Team Howard 🔨	1	0	0	1	0	2	1	0	2	0	1	8
Jayden King	0	0	3	0	1	0	0	1	0	2	0	7

2024 Ontario Tankard

Team Howard
4th Ontario Provincial Championship title

== Qualification ==
=== Open Qualifier ===
January 5–7, Oakville Curling Club, Oakville

A1 Side	To Tankard
Carter Bryant (Brant)	6
Mike Foster (Penetanguishene)	2	Carter Bryant (Brant)	5
Dayna Deruelle (Harriston)	6
Dayna Deruelle (Harriston)	3
Kibo Mulima (Guelph)	9	Kibo Mulima (Guelph)	6
Elias Whittington (Milton)	1	Kibo Mulima (Guelph)	7
Nathan Lohnes (Dundas Valley)	3
Kibo Mulima (Guelph)	8
Michael McCutcheon (High Park)	6	Bowie Abbis-Mills (Carleton Place)	3
Jacob Lamb (Dundas Valley)	3	Michael McCutcheon (High Park)	5
Ian Dickie (KW Granite)	6
Ian Dickie (KW Granite)	5
Kyle Mogavero (Tam Heather)	1	Bowie Abbis-Mills (Carleton Place)	6
Bowie Abbis-Mills (Carleton Place)	6	Bowie Abbis-Mills (Carleton Place)	6
Jordan McNamara (Rideau)	5

A2 Side	To Tankard
John McCutcheon (High Park)	6
Mackenzie Calwell (Ottawa)	7	Mackenzie Calwell (Ottawa)	6
Greg Balsdon (Richmond Hill)	2
Mackenzie Calwell (Ottawa)	8
Michael Harris (Oakville)	7	Ken McCulloch (Campbellford)	2
Ken McCulloch (Campbellford)	8	Ken McCulloch (Campbellford)	7
Fraser Reid (Westmount)	5
Mackenzie Calwell (Ottawa)	7
Randy Hansuld (Mississaugua)	2	Travis Fanset (Tillsonburg)	8
Daniel Hocevar (Dixie)	9	Daniel Hocevar (Dixie)	2
Rob Ainsley (Royals)	5
Rob Ainsley (Royals)	4
Matthew Dupuis (Cornwall)	6	Travis Fanset (Tillsonburg)	6
Connor Massey (Cataraqui)	8	Connor Massey (Cataraqui)	1
Travis Fanset (Tillsonburg)	12

B1 Side	To Tankard
Nathan Lohnes (Dundas Valley)	8
Jacob Lamb (Dundas Valley)	4	Rob Ainsley (Royals)	4
Carter Bryant (Brant)	2	Jacob Lamb (Dundas Valley)	5
Kyle Mogavero (Tam Heather)	5	Nathan Lohnes (Dundas Valley)	6
Nathan Lohnes (Dundas Valley)	7	Nathan Lohnes (Dundas Valley)	8
Mike Foster (Penetanguishene)	5
Ken McCulloch (Campbellford)	5
Mike Foster (Penetanguishene)	10	Mike Foster (Penetanguishene)	6
Michael McCutcheon (High Park)	4	Mike Foster (Penetanguishene)	10
Elias Whittington (Milton)	5	Jordan McNamara (Rideau)	6
Jordan McNamara (Rideau)	7	Bowie Abbis-Mills (Carleton Place)	4
Nathan Lohnes (Dundas Valley)	8

B2 Side	To Tankard
Greg Balsdon (Richmond Hill)	7
Randy Hansuld (Mississaugua)	2	Ian Dickie (KW Granite)	6
Greg Balsdon (Richmond Hill)	9	Greg Balsdon (Richmond Hill)	5
Matthew Dupuis (Cornwall)	7	Matthew Dupuis (Cornwall)	3
Fraser Reid (Westmount)	1	Greg Balsdon (Richmond Hill)	8
Dayna Deruelle (Harriston)	4
Daniel Hocevar (Dixie)	6
John McCutcheon (High Park)	4	Dayna Deruelle (Harriston)	8
Daniel Hocevar (Dixie)	8	Daniel Hocevar (Dixie)	9
Michael Harris (Oakville)	4	Connor Massey (Cataraqui)	4
Connor Massey (Cataraqui)	6	Mackenzie Calwell (Ottawa)	5
Greg Balsdon (Richmond Hill)	6
