= Jayden King =

Canadian curler (born 2002)

- Curler
- Born: March 17, 2002 (age 24); London, Ontario

Team
- Curling club: Tillsonburg CC, Tillsonburg, ON
- Skip: Jayden King
- Third: Dylan Niepage
- Second: Owen Henry
- Lead: Victor Pietrangelo
- Mixed doubles partner: Grace Cave

Curling career
- Member Association: Ontario
- Brier: 1 (2026)
- Top CTRS ranking: 7th (2025–26)

Jayden King (born March 17, 2002, in London) is a Canadian curler from Courtland, Ontario. He currently skips his own team out of Tillsonburg. In 2026, King made history by becoming the first Black skip in Brier history after winning the 2026 Ontario Tankard.

King began curling around the age of 10 after watching it at a neighbour's house in Tillsonburg.

== Career ==
=== Juniors ===
King had a breakthrough 2021–22 season as a member of the Dylan Niepage rink that also included Gavin Lydiate and Daniel Del Conte. In August, the team went undefeated to win the Oakville Under 25 Kick-off, their first victory on the men's tour. They also advanced through the first cashspiel qualifier of the 2022 Ontario Tankard to qualify for their first provincial men's championship. There, they reached the B semifinals before dropping back-to-back games to Scott Howard and Tanner Horgan, eliminating them from contention. At the Ontario U20 Curling Championships, the team dropped the first final to Landan Rooney, however, defeated Christopher Inglis in the second final to earn the right to compete at the 2022 Canadian Junior Curling Championships as Ontario 2. At the championship, the team finished 4–4 in the round robin, not enough to advance to the playoffs.

The following season, King returned to skipping his own team, forming a new rink with Jack Ragan, Owen Henry and Jacob Clarke. This team won the Ontario junior championship, defeating Canadian junior champion Landan Rooney in the final. At the 2023 Canadian Junior Curling Championships, they missed the playoffs with a 3–5 record.

=== Men's ===
Out of juniors, King reunited with his former teammates Niepage, Lydiate and Del Conte for the 2023–24 season and took over as skip. On the men's tour, the team saw immediate success, winning the Capital Curling Fall Open and reaching the final of the Stroud Sleeman Cash Spiel. They also made it to the semifinals of the Summer Series and the quarterfinals of the 2023 KW Fall Classic and 2023 Stu Sells Tankard. With their points accumulated on the Ontario tour, the team was able to directly qualify for the 2024 Ontario Tankard. There, Team King lost in the A and B brackets to Sam Mooibroek but bounced back to qualify for the playoffs through the C event. Notably in the C bracket semifinal, King and his team faced Kibo Mulima, marking the first time that two Black skips faced off against each other at a provincial championship. In the playoffs, Team King then scored upset victories over Pat Ferris and John Epping to qualify for the provincial final. Facing Scott Howard, the team lost 8–7 in an extra end, finishing second. To end the season, Team King represented the University of Guelph at the 2024 U Sports/Curling Canada University Curling Championships after finishing third at the Ontario University Athletics championship. There, they had a disappointing 3–4 sixth-place finish. After the season, Gavin Lydiate left the team and was replaced by Owen Henry.

To start the 2024–25 season, Team King finished runner-up at the U25 NextGen Classic to Jordon McDonald. On tour, they continued to find steady success, though they did not win any event titles. Their best result came at the Stu Sells Port Elgin Superspiel where they lost in the final to Korea's Park Jong-duk. In the new year, the team qualified for the 2025 Ontario Tankard through CTRS points. After finishing runner-up the year before, the team was not able to replicate their success, finishing 3–3 and failing to advance to the playoff round. For the following season, Daniel Del Conte was replaced by Victor Pietrangelo.

The 2025–26 season marked Team King's best season to date as they climbed to seventh on the CTRS rankings and qualified in all but one event they played. To begin, the team competed in the 2025 U25 NextGen Classic where they were again eliminated by Jordon McDonald, this time in the semifinals. They then played in the 2025 KW Fall Classic where they had an undefeated run up until the final where they lost to Italy's Joël Retornaz. The team then had a pair of quarterfinal losses at the 2025 Masters Tier 2 Grand Slam event and 2025 Stu Sells Toronto Tankard, falling to Daniel Casper and Magnus Ramsfjell respectively. In October, the team participated in the 2025 Canadian Olympic Curling Pre-Trials, qualifying as the eighth seeds after Team Reid Carruthers declined their invitation. There, the team had an impressive showing, going 4–3 and just missing the playoffs. They bounced back with back-to-back finals appearances at the Broken Broom Tobacco Belt Cash Spiel and Stu Sells Living Waters Collingwood Classic, losing to Mark Kean and Scott Howard. In January, the team played in the 2026 Ontario Tankard where they entered as the top seeds. After qualifying for the playoffs through the A bracket, they lost the 1 vs. 2 game to Sam Mooibroek. They then beat Mark Kean in the semifinal to set up a rematch against Mooibroek in the final. Tied in the ninth end, the team scored two points before stealing in the tenth end to win the game 9–6, capturing the Ontario Tankard title and sending them to the 2026 Montana's Brier in St. John's, Newfoundland and Labrador. Also with the win, King made history by becoming the first Black skip in Brier history. At the Brier, King led his team to a 5–3 round robin record, enough to qualify for the championship round. They then lost to Brad Gushue 12–6 in the page qualifier and were eliminated.

=== Mixed doubles ===
In 2025, King found significant mixed doubles success with partner Grace Cave at the 2025 U25 NextGen Classic. There, the pair reached the final where they were defeated by Serena Gray-Withers and Victor Pietrangelo 8–2. Also in 2025, the pair went undefeated at the Ontario mixed doubles provincial championship until the semifinal where they lost to Katie Ford and Oliver Campbell.

=== Mixed ===
King skipped Ontario at the 2024 Canadian Mixed Curling Championship. With teammates Grace Cave, Daniel Del Conte and Jillian Uniacke, the team missed the playoffs with a 2–4 record, ultimately finishing twelfth with a 3–6 record.

== Personal life ==
King is currently a physiotherapy student at McMaster University. He previously attended the University of Guelph and Glendale High School in Tillsonburg. King's father is an immigrant from Trinidad and Tobago.

== Teams ==
| Season | Skip | Third | Second | Lead |
|---|---|---|---|---|
| 2016–17 | Jayden King | Nolan Bryant | Evan Prior | Patrick Meyer |
| 2017–18 | Jayden King | Carter Bryant | Nolan Bryant | Patrick Meyer |
| 2018–19 | Daniel Del Conte | Jayden King | Samuel Guilbeault | Vincent Barbon |
| 2019–20 | Jayden King | Jett Gazeley | Kaamraan Islam | Cole Lacroix-Lyon |
| 2021–22 | Dylan Niepage | Gavin Lydiate | Jayden King | Daniel Del Conte |
| 2022–23 | Jayden King | Jack Ragan | Owen Henry | Jacob Clarke |
| 2023–24 | Jayden King | Dylan Niepage | Gavin Lydiate | Daniel Del Conte |
| 2024–25 | Jayden King | Dylan Niepage | Owen Henry | Daniel Del Conte |
| 2025–26 | Jayden King | Dylan Niepage | Owen Henry | Victor Pietrangelo |
| 2026–27 | Jayden King | Dylan Niepage | Owen Henry | Victor Pietrangelo |
