= U25 NextGen Classic =

- Host city: Edmonton, Alberta
- Arena: Saville Community Sports Centre
- Current men's winner: (Manitoba) Jordon McDonald
- Current women's winner: (Alberta) Gracelyn Richards
- Current mixed doubles winner: (Alberta) Cinnamon / Tao

The U25 NextGen Classic is an annual curling tournament held at the Saville Community Sports Centre in Edmonton, Alberta. The event was originally held each year in late August to early September with the goal of helping junior teams to transition into the adult ranks. Starting in 2026, the men's and women's event was moved to April, with the mixed doubles event still happening in the fall.

The event is streamed on Curling Canada's YouTube page.

== History ==
The event was created by Curling Canada to help Canadian junior curlers transition into men's and women's play. It allows teams that are a combined age of 100 years or less (50 for mixed doubles) the opportunity to play against each other with the opportunity for direct entry into Curling Canada's NextGen Future program, which includes access to Curling Canada's National Coaches, among other benefits. The event was first held in 2022 following the inaugural Best of the West U30 event at the end of the 2021–22 season. The 2022 event featured 10 men's and women's teams and 16 mixed doubles teams. In 2023, the event was expanded, with 12 men's and women's teams and 20 mixed doubles teams.

== Past Champions ==
=== Men ===
Year	Winning team	Runner-up team	Purse (CDN)
2022	(Ontario) Sam Mooibroek, Connor Deane, Nathan Steele, Colin Schnurr	(Nova Scotia) Owen Purcell, Joel Krats, Adam McEachren, Scott Weagle	$16,000
2023	(Saskatchewan) Rylan Kleiter, Joshua Mattern, Matthew Hall, Trevor Johnson	(Ontario) Sam Mooibroek, Scott Mitchell, Nathan Steele, Colin Schnurr	$16,000
2024	(Manitoba) Jordon McDonald, Dallas Burgess, Elias Huminicki, Cameron Olafson	(Ontario) Jayden King, Dylan Niepage, Owen Henry, Daniel Del Conte	$16,000
2025	(Ontario) Sam Mooibroek, Ryan Wiebe, Scott Mitchell, Nathan Steele	(Manitoba) Jordon McDonald, Jacques Gauthier, Elias Huminicki, Cameron Olafson	$12,250
2026	(Manitoba) Jordon McDonald, Jacques Gauthier, Elias Huminicki, Cameron Olafson	(Ontario) Daniel Hocevar, Zander Elmes, Joel Matthews, Daniel Del Conte, Johnson Tao	$7,500

=== Women ===
Year	Winning team	Runner-up team	Purse (CDN)
2022	(Alberta) Serena Gray-Withers, Catherine Clifford, Brianna Cullen, Zoe Cinnamon	(Saskatchewan) Skylar Ackerman, Kya Kennedy, Taylor Stremick, Kelcee Kennedy	$16,000
2023	(Alberta) Serena Gray-Withers, Catherine Clifford, Brianna Cullen, Zoe Cinnamon	(Alberta) Abby Marks, Elysa Crough, Kim Bonneau, Julianna Mackenzie	$16,000
2024	(British Columbia) Taylor Reese-Hansen, Megan McGillivray, Kim Bonneau, Julianna Mackenzie	(Alberta) Gracelyn Richards, Emma Yarmuch, Sophia Ryhorchuk, Rachel Jacques	$16,000
2025	(Alberta) Serena Gray-Withers, Catherine Clifford, Lindsey Burgess, Zoe Cinnamon	(New Brunswick) Mélodie Forsythe, Rebecca Watson, Carly Smith, Jenna Campbell	$12,250
2026	(Alberta) Gracelyn Richards, Emma Yarmuch, Rachel Jacques, Sophia Ryhorchuk	(Manitoba) Shaela Hayward, India Young, Keira Krahn, Dayna Wahl	$7,500

=== Mixed doubles ===
Year	Winning team	Runner-up team	Purse (CDN)
2022	(Ontario) Jessica Zheng / Victor Pietrangelo	(Alberta) Paige Papley / Evan van Amsterdam	$10,000
2023	(British Columbia) Kayla MacMillan / Sterling Middleton	(Ontario) Jessica Zheng / Victor Pietrangelo	$11,000
2024	(Ontario) Jessica Zheng / Victor Pietrangelo	(Manitoba) Mackenzie Arbuckle / Aaron Macdonell	$11,000
2025	(Alberta) (Ontario) Serena Gray-Withers / Victor Pietrangelo	(Ontario) Grace Cave / Jayden King	$7,000
2026	(Alberta) Zoe Cinnamon / Johnson Tao	(Alberta) (Ontario) Serena Gray-Withers / Victor Pietrangelo	$7,000
