= 2025 U25 NextGen Classic =

- Host city: Edmonton, Alberta
- Arena: Saville Community Sports Centre
- Dates: August 26–31
- Men's Winner: (Ontario) Sam Mooibroek
- Men's Finalist: (Manitoba) Jordon McDonald
- Women's Winner: (Alberta) Serena Gray-Withers
- Women's Finalist: (New Brunswick) Mélodie Forsythe
- Mixed doubles Winner: (Alberta) (Ontario) Gray-Withers / Pietrangelo
- Mixed doubles Finalist: (Ontario) Cave / King

The 2025 U25 NextGen Classic was held from August 26 to 31 at the Saville Community Sports Centre in Edmonton, Alberta. The champions in the men's and women's events earned spots in Curling Canada's National NextGen Program for the 2025–26 curling season, which includes $6,000 in program funding and access to Curling Canada's National Coaches, among other benefits. Like the men's and women's winners, the mixed doubles champion also received a berth into Curling Canada's NextGen Program for the upcoming season, with $3,000 in program funding and access to Curling Canada's National Coaches, among other benefits.

== Qualification process ==
The men's and women's events consisted of 12 teams each: 10 teams from the Canadian Team Ranking System (CTRS), the 2025 New Holland Canadian Junior Champions, and one team of each gender selected by a Curling Canada selection panel. To be eligible, teams must have had a combined age of 100 or less as of June 30, 2025. Additionally, participating teams committed to competing in a minimum of five tour events, plus their respective men's or women's provincial/territorial playdowns, during the 2025-26 season.

For the mixed doubles event, it consisted of 20 teams: sixteen teams were selected from the Canadian Mixed Doubles Rankings (CMDR), and a Curling Canada selection panel chose four teams. Mixed doubles teams must have a combined age of 50 or under as of June 30, 2025. They must also commit to competing in at least two tour events, plus their mixed doubles provincial/territorial championship OR an additional tour event during the upcoming season.

== Men ==
=== Teams ===
The teams are listed as follows:

Skip	Third	Second	Lead	Alternate	Club
Zachary Davies	Ronan Peterson	William Butler	Adam Naugler		Saville Community SC, Edmonton, Alberta
Jace Freeman	Dallas Burgess	Ryan Ostrowsky	Aaron Macdonell	Emerson Klimpke	Virden CC, Virden, Manitoba
Tanner Graham	Ethan Brandt	Nick Senff	Roan Hunker		St. Vital CC, Winnipeg, Manitoba
Daniel Hocevar	Zander Elmes	Joel Matthews	Daniel Del Conte		Toronto CC, Toronto, Ontario
Jayden King	Dylan Niepage	Owen Henry	Victor Pietrangelo		London CC, London, Ontario
Jacob Libbus	Nathan Molberg	Zachary Pawliuk	Michael Hendricks		Ellerslie CC, Edmonton, Alberta
Calan MacIsaac	Nathan Gray	Owain Fisher	Christopher McCurdy	Nick Mosher	Truro CC, Truro, Nova Scotia
Jordon McDonald	Jacques Gauthier	Elias Huminicki	Cameron Olafson		Assiniboine Memorial CC, Winnipeg, Manitoba
Sam Mooibroek	Ryan Wiebe	Scott Mitchell	Nathan Steele		Whitby CC, Whitby, Ontario
Brad Moser	Bryden Tessier	David Baum	Cody Sutherland		Nutana CC, Saskatoon, Saskatchewan
Simon Perry	Nicholas Codner	Brayden Snow	Carter Holden		St. John's CC, St. John's, Newfoundland and Labrador
Johnson Tao	Kenan Wipf	Benjamin Morin	Andrew Nowell		Saville Community SC, Edmonton, Alberta

=== Round robin standings ===
Final Round Robin Standings

Key
Teams to Playoffs

Pool A	W	L	W–L
(Ontario) Sam Mooibroek	4	1	1–0
(Ontario) Jayden King	4	1	0–1
(Newfoundland and Labrador) Simon Perry	3	2	–
(Saskatchewan) Brad Moser	2	3	1–0
(Alberta) Zachary Davies	2	3	0–1
(Manitoba) Jace Freeman	0	5	–

Pool B	W	L	W–L
(Manitoba) Jordon McDonald	5	0	–
(Nova Scotia) Calan MacIsaac	4	1	–
(Alberta) Johnson Tao	3	2	–
(Alberta) Jacob Libbus	2	3	–
(Ontario) Daniel Hocevar	1	4	–
(Manitoba) Tanner Graham	0	5	–

=== Round robin results ===
All draw times are listed in Mountain Time (UTC−07:00).

==== Draw 1 ====
Tuesday, August 26, 8:00 am

Sheet 3	1	2	3	4	5	6	7	8	Final
(Saskatchewan) Brad Moser	1	0	0	2	0	0	2	2	7
(Manitoba) Jace Freeman 🔨	0	2	0	0	1	1	0	0	4

Sheet 4	1	2	3	4	5	6	7	8	Final
(Ontario) Sam Mooibroek	1	0	0	1	0	1	0	X	3
(Newfoundland and Labrador) Simon Perry 🔨	0	1	2	0	2	0	3	X	8

Sheet 5	1	2	3	4	5	6	7	8	Final
(Ontario) Jayden King 🔨	2	0	2	0	1	0	0	2	7
(Alberta) Zachary Davies	0	2	0	1	0	2	0	0	5

Sheet 6	1	2	3	4	5	6	7	8	Final
(Nova Scotia) Calan MacIsaac 🔨	0	2	0	3	0	0	0	2	7
(Ontario) Daniel Hocevar	0	0	1	0	2	1	0	0	4

Sheet 7	1	2	3	4	5	6	7	8	Final
(Manitoba) Tanner Graham	0	0	3	0	1	0	X	X	4
(Manitoba) Jordon McDonald 🔨	2	2	0	5	0	1	X	X	10

Sheet 8	1	2	3	4	5	6	7	8	Final
(Alberta) Jacob Libbus	0	0	0	0	1	0	0	X	1
(Alberta) Johnson Tao 🔨	1	0	2	2	0	1	1	X	7

==== Draw 3 ====
Tuesday, August 26, 4:00 pm

Sheet 3	1	2	3	4	5	6	7	8	Final
(Alberta) Johnson Tao	0	0	1	1	0	0	0	X	2
(Manitoba) Jordon McDonald 🔨	1	1	0	0	0	2	1	X	5

Sheet 4	1	2	3	4	5	6	7	8	Final
(Alberta) Jacob Libbus	1	0	0	2	0	1	2	0	6
(Nova Scotia) Calan MacIsaac 🔨	0	0	2	0	2	0	0	4	8

Sheet 5	1	2	3	4	5	6	7	8	Final
(Manitoba) Tanner Graham 🔨	2	0	3	0	1	0	1	0	7
(Ontario) Daniel Hocevar	0	2	0	1	0	3	0	2	8

Sheet 6	1	2	3	4	5	6	7	8	Final
(Newfoundland and Labrador) Simon Perry 🔨	2	0	0	3	0	4	0	1	10
(Manitoba) Jace Freeman	0	3	1	0	3	0	2	0	9

Sheet 7	1	2	3	4	5	6	7	8	Final
(Ontario) Jayden King 🔨	1	2	0	4	0	0	X	X	7
(Saskatchewan) Brad Moser	0	0	1	0	1	0	X	X	2

Sheet 8	1	2	3	4	5	6	7	8	Final
(Alberta) Zachary Davies 🔨	0	2	0	1	0	0	0	1	4
(Ontario) Sam Mooibroek	0	0	2	0	0	3	1	0	6

==== Draw 5 ====
Wednesday, August 27, 8:00 am

Sheet 3	1	2	3	4	5	6	7	8	Final
(Alberta) Jacob Libbus 🔨	0	0	1	1	1	0	2	X	5
(Manitoba) Tanner Graham	1	0	0	0	0	1	0	X	2

Sheet 4	1	2	3	4	5	6	7	8	Final
(Ontario) Daniel Hocevar	0	0	0	0	0	1	X	X	1
(Manitoba) Jordon McDonald 🔨	0	2	1	2	1	0	X	X	6

Sheet 5	1	2	3	4	5	6	7	8	Final
(Alberta) Johnson Tao	0	2	0	1	0	1	0	X	4
(Nova Scotia) Calan MacIsaac 🔨	1	0	4	0	2	0	2	X	9

Sheet 6	1	2	3	4	5	6	7	8	Final
(Alberta) Zachary Davies 🔨	2	0	1	0	0	0	1	0	4
(Saskatchewan) Brad Moser	0	3	0	0	1	1	0	1	6

Sheet 7	1	2	3	4	5	6	7	8	Final
(Manitoba) Jace Freeman	0	1	0	0	2	0	3	0	6
(Ontario) Sam Mooibroek 🔨	3	0	0	1	0	1	0	2	7

Sheet 8	1	2	3	4	5	6	7	8	Final
(Ontario) Jayden King	1	0	1	0	1	1	1	X	5
(Newfoundland and Labrador) Simon Perry 🔨	0	1	0	1	0	0	0	X	2

==== Draw 7 ====
Wednesday, August 27, 4:00 pm

Sheet 3	1	2	3	4	5	6	7	8	Final
(Newfoundland and Labrador) Simon Perry	0	0	0	0	0	3	0	X	3
(Alberta) Zachary Davies 🔨	1	0	1	2	1	0	1	X	6

Sheet 4	1	2	3	4	5	6	7	8	Final
(Manitoba) Jace Freeman	0	1	0	0	1	0	0	X	2
(Ontario) Jayden King 🔨	1	0	0	2	0	1	5	X	9

Sheet 5	1	2	3	4	5	6	7	8	Final
(Ontario) Sam Mooibroek 🔨	3	0	3	0	1	0	X	X	7
(Saskatchewan) Brad Moser	0	1	0	1	0	1	X	X	3

Sheet 6	1	2	3	4	5	6	7	8	Final
(Alberta) Johnson Tao 🔨	2	0	0	0	0	2	0	1	5
(Manitoba) Tanner Graham	0	0	0	1	0	0	2	0	3

Sheet 7	1	2	3	4	5	6	7	8	Final
(Ontario) Daniel Hocevar	1	0	1	0	0	0	0	X	2
(Alberta) Jacob Libbus 🔨	0	1	0	2	2	1	1	X	7

Sheet 8	1	2	3	4	5	6	7	8	Final
(Manitoba) Jordon McDonald	2	1	2	2	0	0	X	X	7
(Nova Scotia) Calan MacIsaac 🔨	0	0	0	0	1	0	X	X	1

==== Draw 9 ====
Thursday, August 28, 8:00 am

Sheet 3	1	2	3	4	5	6	7	8	Final
(Ontario) Daniel Hocevar 🔨	0	0	2	0	0	1	X	X	3
(Alberta) Johnson Tao	0	2	0	2	3	0	X	X	7

Sheet 4	1	2	3	4	5	6	7	8	9	Final
(Nova Scotia) Calan MacIsaac 🔨	1	0	1	0	2	3	2	0	1	10
(Manitoba) Tanner Graham	0	3	0	4	0	0	0	2	0	9

Sheet 5	1	2	3	4	5	6	7	8	Final
(Manitoba) Jordon McDonald 🔨	3	0	0	2	1	0	2	X	8
(Alberta) Jacob Libbus	0	2	0	0	0	1	0	X	3

Sheet 6	1	2	3	4	5	6	7	8	Final
(Ontario) Sam Mooibroek	0	0	2	0	0	0	1	2	5
(Ontario) Jayden King 🔨	2	0	0	0	1	0	0	0	3

Sheet 7	1	2	3	4	5	6	7	8	Final
(Saskatchewan) Brad Moser	0	0	0	0	1	1	0	X	2
(Newfoundland and Labrador) Simon Perry 🔨	1	1	1	1	0	0	3	X	7

Sheet 8	1	2	3	4	5	6	7	8	Final
(Manitoba) Jace Freeman	0	0	0	2	1	0	2	0	5
(Alberta) Zachary Davies 🔨	1	0	2	0	0	3	0	3	9

=== Playoffs ===
Semifinals
A1	(Ontario) Sam Mooibroek	7
B2	(Nova Scotia) Calan MacIsaac	5
B1	(Manitoba) Jordon McDonald	8
A2	(Ontario) Jayden King	2

Final
A1	(Ontario) Sam Mooibroek	6
B1	(Manitoba) Jordon McDonald	4

==== Semifinals ====
Thursday, August 28, 4:00 pm

Sheet 3	1	2	3	4	5	6	7	8	Final
(Ontario) Sam Mooibroek	0	2	0	3	0	2	0	X	7
(Nova Scotia) Calan MacIsaac 🔨	1	0	2	0	1	0	1	X	5

Sheet 4	1	2	3	4	5	6	7	8	Final
(Manitoba) Jordon McDonald 🔨	0	1	1	0	0	3	3	X	8
(Ontario) Jayden King	1	0	0	1	0	0	0	X	2

==== Final ====
Thursday, August 28, 8:00 pm

Sheet 5	1	2	3	4	5	6	7	8	Final
(Ontario) Sam Mooibroek	0	1	1	0	0	3	0	1	6
(Manitoba) Jordon McDonald 🔨	0	0	0	1	2	0	1	0	4

== Women ==
=== Teams ===
The teams are listed as follows:

Skip	Third	Second	Lead	Alternate	Club
Emma Artichuk	Jamie Smith	Evelyn Robert	Lauren Rajala		Waterloo CC, Waterloo, Ontario
Keelie Duncan	Ava Koe	Elizabeth Morgan	Carley Hardie		The Glencoe Club, Calgary, Alberta
Cassidy Dundas	Lauren Evason	Eryn Czirfusz	Tessa Terrick		Heather CC, Winnipeg, Manitoba
Katie Ford	Emily Middaugh	Madison Fisher	Kelly Middaugh		Waterloo CC, Waterloo, Ontario
Mélodie Forsythe	Rebecca Watson	Carly Smith	Jenna Campbell		Capital WC, Fredericton, New Brunswick
Serena Gray-Withers	Catherine Clifford	Lindsey Burgess	Zoe Cinnamon		Saville Community SC, Edmonton, Alberta
Holly Hafeli	Gabby Brissette	Jillian Evans	Natalie Hafeli	Ella Casparis	Kamloops CC, Kamloops, British Columbia
Julia Markle	Scotia Maltman	Tori Zemmelink	Sadie McCutcheon		Navan CC, Navan, Ottawa, Ontario
Myla Plett	Alyssa Nedohin	Chloe Fediuk	Allie Iskiw	Abby Whitbread	Saville Community SC, Edmonton, Alberta
Rebecca Regan	Olivia McDonah	Caylee Smith	Ella Kinley		Lakeshore CC, Lower Sackville, Nova Scotia
Gracelyn Richards	Emma Yarmuch	Sophie Ryhorchuk	Rachel Jacques	Amy Wheatcroft	Saville Community SC, Edmonton, Alberta
Kayla Wilson	Jorja Kopytko	Sarah Wong	Amanda Wong		Victoria CC, Victoria, British Columbia

=== Round robin standings ===
Final Round Robin Standings

Key
Teams to Playoffs

Pool A	W	L	W–L
(Alberta) Myla Plett	4	1	1–0
(Ontario) Emma Artichuk	4	1	0–1
(British Columbia) Holly Hafeli	2	3	1–1
(Ontario) Julia Markle	2	3	1–1
(Nova Scotia) Rebecca Regan	2	3	1–1
(Ontario) Katie Ford	1	4	–

Pool B	W	L	W–L
(Alberta) Serena Gray-Withers	5	0	–
(New Brunswick) Mélodie Forsythe	4	1	–
(Manitoba) Cassidy Dundas	3	2	–
(Alberta) Gracelyn Richards	2	3	–
(Alberta) Keelie Duncan	1	4	–
(British Columbia) Kayla Wilson	0	5	–

=== Round robin results ===
All draw times are listed in Mountain Time (UTC−07:00).

==== Draw 2 ====
Tuesday, August 26, 12:00 pm

Sheet 3	1	2	3	4	5	6	7	8	Final
(Ontario) Julia Markle	0	1	0	2	0	0	0	0	3
(Ontario) Katie Ford 🔨	1	0	1	0	2	0	1	1	6

Sheet 4	1	2	3	4	5	6	7	8	Final
(Alberta) Myla Plett	1	0	2	0	1	2	0	X	6
(Nova Scotia) Rebecca Regan 🔨	0	1	0	1	0	0	1	X	3

Sheet 5	1	2	3	4	5	6	7	8	Final
(Ontario) Emma Artichuk	0	1	0	2	1	3	0	X	7
(British Columbia) Holly Hafeli 🔨	1	0	1	0	0	0	1	X	3

Sheet 6	1	2	3	4	5	6	7	8	Final
(New Brunswick) Mélodie Forsythe 🔨	0	0	0	1	3	0	2	X	6
(Alberta) Keelie Duncan	0	0	2	0	0	1	0	X	3

Sheet 7	1	2	3	4	5	6	7	8	Final
(British Columbia) Kayla Wilson	0	1	0	0	1	0	X	X	2
(Alberta) Serena Gray-Withers 🔨	1	0	4	5	0	1	X	X	11

Sheet 8	1	2	3	4	5	6	7	8	Final
(Alberta) Gracelyn Richards	0	0	1	3	0	0	0	X	4
(Manitoba) Cassidy Dundas 🔨	1	3	0	0	1	1	1	X	7

==== Draw 4 ====
Tuesday, August 26, 8:00 pm

Sheet 3	1	2	3	4	5	6	7	8	Final
(Manitoba) Cassidy Dundas	0	0	0	2	0	1	1	X	4
(Alberta) Serena Gray-Withers 🔨	2	2	1	0	1	0	0	X	6

Sheet 4	1	2	3	4	5	6	7	8	Final
(Alberta) Gracelyn Richards 🔨	2	0	1	0	0	1	2	0	6
(New Brunswick) Mélodie Forsythe	0	0	0	0	5	0	0	2	7

Sheet 5	1	2	3	4	5	6	7	8	Final
(British Columbia) Kayla Wilson 🔨	0	0	2	0	0	2	1	1	6
(Alberta) Keelie Duncan	2	1	0	2	2	0	0	0	7

Sheet 6	1	2	3	4	5	6	7	8	Final
(Nova Scotia) Rebecca Regan 🔨	0	1	1	4	0	3	X	X	9
(Ontario) Katie Ford	0	0	0	0	2	0	X	X	2

Sheet 7	1	2	3	4	5	6	7	8	Final
(Ontario) Emma Artichuk 🔨	3	0	3	1	0	2	X	X	9
(Ontario) Julia Markle	0	2	0	0	1	0	X	X	3

Sheet 8	1	2	3	4	5	6	7	8	Final
(British Columbia) Holly Hafeli	0	0	2	0	0	1	0	X	3
(Alberta) Myla Plett 🔨	1	1	0	2	2	0	5	X	11

==== Draw 6 ====
Wednesday, August 27, 12:00 pm

Sheet 3	1	2	3	4	5	6	7	8	Final
(Alberta) Gracelyn Richards	0	2	0	0	2	0	1	3	8
(British Columbia) Kayla Wilson 🔨	1	0	1	1	0	1	0	0	4

Sheet 4	1	2	3	4	5	6	7	8	Final
(Alberta) Keelie Duncan	0	1	0	0	0	1	0	X	2
(Alberta) Serena Gray-Withers 🔨	1	0	1	2	1	0	0	X	5

Sheet 5	1	2	3	4	5	6	7	8	9	Final
(Manitoba) Cassidy Dundas 🔨	0	1	0	2	0	1	0	1	0	5
(New Brunswick) Mélodie Forsythe	0	0	2	0	2	0	1	0	1	6

Sheet 6	1	2	3	4	5	6	7	8	Final
(British Columbia) Holly Hafeli	0	0	4	0	3	0	3	X	10
(Ontario) Julia Markle 🔨	2	1	0	2	0	1	0	X	6

Sheet 7	1	2	3	4	5	6	7	8	9	Final
(Ontario) Katie Ford	0	0	2	1	1	0	0	2	0	6
(Alberta) Myla Plett 🔨	2	2	0	0	0	1	1	0	1	7

Sheet 8	1	2	3	4	5	6	7	8	Final
(Ontario) Emma Artichuk 🔨	1	1	1	0	0	3	0	X	6
(Nova Scotia) Rebecca Regan	0	0	0	1	1	0	1	X	3

==== Draw 8 ====
Wednesday, August 27, 8:00 pm

Sheet 3	1	2	3	4	5	6	7	8	Final
(Nova Scotia) Rebecca Regan 🔨	0	2	0	1	0	1	1	1	6
(British Columbia) Holly Hafeli	1	0	0	0	2	0	0	0	3

Sheet 4	1	2	3	4	5	6	7	8	Final
(Ontario) Katie Ford	0	2	0	0	0	0	X	X	2
(Ontario) Emma Artichuk 🔨	1	0	2	1	0	3	X	X	7

Sheet 5	1	2	3	4	5	6	7	8	Final
(Alberta) Myla Plett	0	0	1	0	0	0	X	X	1
(Ontario) Julia Markle 🔨	2	1	0	2	2	4	X	X	11

Sheet 6	1	2	3	4	5	6	7	8	Final
(Manitoba) Cassidy Dundas	2	3	0	2	0	2	X	X	9
(British Columbia) Kayla Wilson 🔨	0	0	1	0	1	0	X	X	2

Sheet 7	1	2	3	4	5	6	7	8	Final
(Alberta) Keelie Duncan	0	0	0	0	0	X	X	X	0
(Alberta) Gracelyn Richards 🔨	1	1	1	1	2	X	X	X	6

Sheet 8	1	2	3	4	5	6	7	8	Final
(Alberta) Serena Gray-Withers 🔨	0	3	0	4	0	2	X	X	9
(New Brunswick) Mélodie Forsythe	0	0	1	0	2	0	X	X	3

==== Draw 10 ====
Thursday, August 28, 12:00 pm

Sheet 3	1	2	3	4	5	6	7	8	Final
(Alberta) Keelie Duncan	0	0	0	2	1	0	0	X	3
(Manitoba) Cassidy Dundas 🔨	1	1	1	0	0	2	0	X	5

Sheet 4	1	2	3	4	5	6	7	8	Final
(New Brunswick) Mélodie Forsythe	0	1	0	1	2	2	1	X	7
(British Columbia) Kayla Wilson 🔨	1	0	1	0	0	0	0	X	2

Sheet 5	1	2	3	4	5	6	7	8	Final
(Alberta) Serena Gray-Withers 🔨	2	0	3	0	0	3	X	X	8
(Alberta) Gracelyn Richards	0	0	0	1	0	0	X	X	1

Sheet 6	1	2	3	4	5	6	7	8	Final
(Alberta) Myla Plett	1	0	1	1	0	1	0	2	6
(Ontario) Emma Artichuk 🔨	0	1	0	0	3	0	1	0	5

Sheet 7	1	2	3	4	5	6	7	8	Final
(Ontario) Julia Markle	0	1	0	1	1	0	1	X	4
(Nova Scotia) Rebecca Regan 🔨	1	0	1	0	0	0	0	X	2

Sheet 8	1	2	3	4	5	6	7	8	Final
(Ontario) Katie Ford 🔨	0	0	0	0	1	0	X	X	1
(British Columbia) Holly Hafeli	0	0	3	3	0	1	X	X	7

=== Playoffs ===
Semifinals
A1	(Alberta) Myla Plett	3
B2	(New Brunswick) Mélodie Forsythe	4
B1	(Alberta) Serena Gray-Withers	6
A2	(Ontario) Emma Artichuk	5

Final
B2	(New Brunswick) Mélodie Forsythe	2
B1	(Alberta) Serena Gray-Withers	11

==== Semifinals ====
Thursday, August 28, 4:00 pm

Sheet 7	1	2	3	4	5	6	7	8	Final
(Alberta) Myla Plett	0	0	2	0	0	1	0	0	3
(New Brunswick) Mélodie Forsythe 🔨	0	1	0	1	0	0	0	2	4

Sheet 8	1	2	3	4	5	6	7	8	9	Final
(Alberta) Serena Gray-Withers 🔨	2	0	1	1	0	0	1	0	1	6
(Ontario) Emma Artichuk	0	1	0	0	2	1	0	1	0	5

==== Final ====
Thursday, August 28, 8:00 pm

Sheet 6	1	2	3	4	5	6	7	8	Final
(New Brunswick) Mélodie Forsythe	0	2	0	0	X	X	X	X	2
(Alberta) Serena Gray-Withers 🔨	4	0	6	1	X	X	X	X	11

== Mixed doubles ==
=== Teams ===
The teams are listed as follows:

Female	Male	Club
Mackenzie Arbuckle	Aaron Macdonell	Fort Rouge CC, Winnipeg, Manitoba
Sarah Bailey	Dylan Sipura	Milton CC, Milton, Ontario
Lindsey Burgess	Benjamin Morin	Saville Community SC, Edmonton, Alberta
Jenna Campbell	James Carr	Capital WC, Fredericton, New Brunswick
Grace Cave	Jayden King	London CC, London, Ontario
Zoe Cinnamon	Johnson Tao	Saville Community SC, Edmonton, Alberta
Keelie Duncan	Michael Keenan	The Glencoe Club, Calgary, Alberta
Serena Gray-Withers	Victor Pietrangelo	Saville Community SC, Edmonton, Alberta (Ontario) Niagara Falls CC, Niagara Falls
Brooklyn Ideson	Owen Henry	London CC, London, Ontario
Julianna Mackenzie	Sterling Middleton	Victoria CC, Victoria, British Columbia
Meaghan Mallett	Brendan Jackson	Ottawa CC, Ottawa, Ontario
Emily Neary	Dylan Hancock	St. John's CC, St. John's, Newfoundland and Labrador
Kaylee Raniseth	Evan Crough	The Glencoe Club, Calgary, Alberta
Gracelyn Richards	Zachary Davies	Saville Community SC, Edmonton, Alberta
Sophia Ryhorchuk	Ronan Peterson	Saville Community SC, Edmonton, Alberta
Megan Smith	Dylan Niepage	Guelph CC, Guelph, Ontario
Rebecca Watson	Sean Beland	Capital WC, Fredericton, New Brunswick
Amy Wheatcroft	Adam Naugler	Saville Community SC, Edmonton, Alberta
Olivia Wynter	Cameron Sallaj	Curl Moncton, Moncton, New Brunswick
Emma Yarmuch	Lucas Sawiak	Saville Community SC, Edmonton, Alberta

=== Round robin standings ===
Final Round Robin Standings

Key
Teams to Playoffs

Pool A	W	L	W–L
(Alberta) (Ontario) Gray-Withers / Pietrangelo	5	0	–
(Alberta) Richards / Davies	3	2	–
(Alberta) Cinnamon / Tao	2	3	2–0
(Alberta) Wheatcroft / Naugler	2	3	1–1
(New Brunswick) Wynter / Sallaj	2	3	0–2
Pool B	W	L	W–L
(Alberta) Burgess / Morin	4	1	–
(Ontario) Smith / Niepage	3	2	–
(Ontario) Ideson / Henry	2	3	1–0
(New Brunswick) Campbell / Carr	2	3	0–1
(Ontario) Bailey / Sipura	0	5	–

Pool C	W	L	W–L
(Ontario) Cave / King	4	1	–
(Alberta) Ryhorchuk / Peterson	3	2	2–0
(Manitoba) Arbuckle / Macdonell	3	2	1–1
(Ontario) Mallett / Jackson	3	2	0–2
(Alberta) Duncan / Keenan	0	5	–
Pool D	W	L	W–L
(Newfoundland and Labrador) Neary / Hancock	3	2	1–0
(British Columbia) Mackenzie / Middleton	3	2	0–1
(New Brunswick) Watson / Beland	2	3	2–0
(Alberta) Raniseth / Crough	2	3	1–1
(Alberta) Yarmuch / Sawiak	2	3	0–2

=== Round robin results ===
All draw times are listed in Mountain Time (UTC−07:00).

==== Draw 11 ====
Friday, August 29, 1:00 pm

Sheet 3	1	2	3	4	5	6	7	8	Final
(Ontario) Cave / King	2	0	1	2	2	1	X	X	8
(Alberta) Duncan / Keenan 🔨	0	1	0	0	0	0	X	X	1

Sheet 4	1	2	3	4	5	6	7	8	Final
(Alberta) Raniseth / Crough	0	0	1	0	0	2	0	X	3
(Newfoundland and Labrador) Neary / Hancock 🔨	1	1	0	1	1	0	3	X	7

Sheet 5	1	2	3	4	5	6	7	8	Final
(British Columbia) Mackenzie / Middleton 🔨	0	1	1	0	0	1	0	X	3
(Alberta) Yarmuch / Sawiak	1	0	0	1	1	0	4	X	7

Sheet 6	1	2	3	4	5	6	7	8	Final
(Alberta) Wheatcroft / Naugler	0	5	0	1	0	3	3	X	12
(New Brunswick) Wynter / Sallaj 🔨	1	0	2	0	4	0	0	X	7

Sheet 7	1	2	3	4	5	6	7	8	Final
(Alberta) Richards / Davies	0	2	0	1	1	0	3	X	7
(Alberta) Cinnamon / Tao 🔨	1	0	1	0	0	1	0	X	3

Sheet 8	1	2	3	4	5	6	7	8	Final
(Ontario) Ideson / Henry	0	1	0	4	0	1	0	0	6
(Ontario) Smith / Niepage 🔨	1	0	1	0	2	0	2	1	7

==== Draw 12 ====
Friday, August 29, 4:30 pm

Sheet 3	1	2	3	4	5	6	7	8	Final
(Alberta) (Ontario) Gray-Withers / Pietrangelo	1	3	0	3	0	X	X	X	7
(Ontario) Ideson / Henry 🔨	0	0	1	0	1	X	X	X	2

Sheet 4	1	2	3	4	5	6	7	8	Final
(Ontario) Smith / Niepage 🔨	0	2	0	0	1	0	X	X	3
(New Brunswick) Campbell / Carr	2	0	2	2	0	2	X	X	8

Sheet 5	1	2	3	4	5	6	7	8	Final
(Ontario) Bailey / Sipura	0	2	1	0	4	0	1	0	8
(Alberta) Burgess / Morin 🔨	3	0	0	4	0	1	0	3	11

Sheet 6	1	2	3	4	5	6	7	8	Final
(Alberta) Ryhorchuk / Peterson	0	3	2	0	0	0	X	X	5
(Ontario) Cave / King 🔨	4	0	0	2	1	3	X	X	10

Sheet 7	1	2	3	4	5	6	7	8	Final
(Alberta) Duncan / Keenan	1	0	4	0	0	2	0	0	7
(Ontario) Mallett / Jackson 🔨	0	2	0	1	1	0	4	1	9

Sheet 8	1	2	3	4	5	6	7	8	Final
(Manitoba) Arbuckle / Macdonell 🔨	2	1	0	1	0	4	3	X	11
(New Brunswick) Watson / Beland	0	0	1	0	2	0	0	X	3

==== Draw 13 ====
Friday, August 29, 8:00 pm

Sheet 2	1	2	3	4	5	6	7	8	Final
(Newfoundland and Labrador) Neary / Hancock	1	3	2	0	6	X	X	X	12
(British Columbia) Mackenzie / Middleton 🔨	0	0	0	3	0	X	X	X	3

Sheet 3	1	2	3	4	5	6	7	8	Final
(Ontario) Mallett / Jackson	3	0	1	0	2	0	3	1	10
(Alberta) Yarmuch / Sawiak 🔨	0	2	0	1	0	2	0	0	5

Sheet 4	1	2	3	4	5	6	7	8	Final
(Manitoba) Arbuckle / Macdonell 🔨	0	2	0	0	0	0	1	X	3
(Alberta) Ryhorchuk / Peterson	1	0	1	1	1	3	0	X	7

Sheet 5	1	2	3	4	5	6	7	8	9	Final
(New Brunswick) Watson / Beland	0	0	0	3	1	0	4	0	1	9
(Alberta) Raniseth / Crough 🔨	2	1	1	0	0	3	0	1	0	8

Sheet 6	1	2	3	4	5	6	7	8	Final
(Alberta) Cinnamon / Tao	0	1	0	0	0	0	X	X	1
(Alberta) Burgess / Morin 🔨	2	0	2	1	1	1	X	X	7

Sheet 7	1	2	3	4	5	6	7	8	Final
(Alberta) (Ontario) Gray-Withers / Pietrangelo 🔨	1	1	1	1	1	0	2	X	7
(Alberta) Wheatcroft / Naugler	0	0	0	0	0	2	0	X	2

Sheet 8	1	2	3	4	5	6	7	8	Final
(New Brunswick) Wynter / Sallaj 🔨	1	1	0	1	0	1	3	X	7
(Alberta) Richards / Davies	0	0	1	0	1	0	0	X	2

Sheet 9	1	2	3	4	5	6	7	8	Final
(New Brunswick) Campbell / Carr 🔨	0	3	1	0	3	0	0	2	9
(Ontario) Bailey / Sipura	2	0	0	1	0	2	1	0	6

==== Draw 14 ====
Saturday, August 30, 9:00 am

Sheet 1	1	2	3	4	5	6	7	8	Final
(Alberta) Richards / Davies	0	5	1	1	0	2	X	X	9
(Ontario) Bailey / Sipura 🔨	1	0	0	0	1	0	X	X	2

Sheet 2	1	2	3	4	5	6	7	8	9	Final
(New Brunswick) Campbell / Carr 🔨	1	0	0	0	1	0	2	1	0	5
(Ontario) Ideson / Henry	0	1	1	2	0	1	0	0	2	7

Sheet 3	1	2	3	4	5	6	7	8	Final
(Ontario) Smith / Niepage	0	3	3	0	0	2	0	1	9
(Alberta) Burgess / Morin 🔨	1	0	0	3	1	0	2	0	7

Sheet 4	1	2	3	4	5	6	7	8	Final
(Alberta) Cinnamon / Tao	0	3	3	0	1	1	X	X	8
(Alberta) Wheatcroft / Naugler 🔨	1	0	0	1	0	0	X	X	2

Sheet 5	1	2	3	4	5	6	7	8	Final
(New Brunswick) Wynter / Sallaj	0	0	0	0	0	X	X	X	0
(Alberta) (Ontario) Gray-Withers / Pietrangelo 🔨	1	1	3	2	3	X	X	X	10

Sheet 6	1	2	3	4	5	6	7	8	Final
(Alberta) Duncan / Keenan 🔨	2	0	1	0	1	0	X	X	4
(British Columbia) MacKenzie / Middleton	0	3	0	3	0	3	X	X	9

Sheet 7	1	2	3	4	5	6	7	8	Final
(Newfoundland and Labrador) Neary / Hancock 🔨	1	1	0	0	1	0	3	X	6
(New Brunswick) Watson / Beland	0	0	1	1	0	1	0	X	3

Sheet 8	1	2	3	4	5	6	7	8	Final
(Alberta) Yarmuch / Sawiak 🔨	0	0	2	0	0	1	0	1	4
(Alberta) Raniseth / Crough	1	2	0	1	1	0	1	0	6

Sheet 9	1	2	3	4	5	6	7	8	Final
(Ontario) Mallett / Jackson	0	0	1	2	3	0	3	0	9
(Alberta) Ryhorchuk / Peterson 🔨	3	3	0	0	0	1	0	3	10

Sheet 10	1	2	3	4	5	6	7	8	Final
(Ontario) Cave / King 🔨	3	0	1	1	0	0	3	X	8
(Manitoba) Arbuckle / Macdonell	0	1	0	0	1	1	0	X	3

==== Draw 15 ====
Saturday, August 30, 1:00 pm

Sheet 1	1	2	3	4	5	6	7	8	Final
(Alberta) Yarmuch / Sawiak	0	1	0	4	0	3	1	X	9
(Newfoundland and Labrador) Neary / Hancock 🔨	2	0	1	0	1	0	0	X	4

Sheet 2	1	2	3	4	5	6	7	8	Final
(Ontario) Mallett / Jackson	1	0	2	0	3	0	2	0	8
(Ontario) Cave / King 🔨	0	2	0	2	0	1	0	2	7

Sheet 3	1	2	3	4	5	6	7	8	Final
(Alberta) Ryhorchuk / Peterson	1	2	0	0	2	0	2	0	7
(Alberta) Raniseth / Crough 🔨	0	0	1	3	0	1	0	3	8

Sheet 4	1	2	3	4	5	6	7	8	Final
(British Columbia) Mackenzie / Middleton 🔨	1	1	2	0	0	0	1	0	5
(New Brunswick) Watson / Beland	0	0	0	1	1	1	0	1	4

Sheet 5	1	2	3	4	5	6	7	8	Final
(Alberta) Duncan / Keenan	0	1	0	0	3	0	3	0	7
(Manitoba) Arbuckle / Macdonell 🔨	1	0	2	2	0	2	0	1	8

Sheet 6	1	2	3	4	5	6	7	8	Final
(Alberta) Richards / Davies	0	0	0	1	0	1	X	X	2
(Alberta) (Ontario) Gray-Withers / Pietrangelo 🔨	3	1	3	0	3	0	X	X	10

Sheet 7	1	2	3	4	5	6	7	8	Final
(Ontario) Bailey / Sipura	0	1	0	0	1	0	X	X	2
(Ontario) Ideson / Henry 🔨	1	0	2	1	0	5	X	X	9

Sheet 8	1	2	3	4	5	6	7	8	Final
(Alberta) Burgess / Morin 🔨	0	2	0	0	2	2	0	X	6
(New Brunswick) Campbell / Carr	1	0	1	1	0	0	1	X	4

Sheet 9	1	2	3	4	5	6	7	8	Final
(Alberta) Wheatcroft / Naugler	1	0	1	0	2	0	3	X	7
(Ontario) Smith / Niepage 🔨	0	1	0	1	0	1	0	X	3

Sheet 10	1	2	3	4	5	6	7	8	Final
(Alberta) Cinnamon / Tao	0	3	1	3	1	X	X	X	8
(New Brunswick) Wynter / Sallaj 🔨	1	0	0	0	0	X	X	X	1

==== Draw 16 ====
Saturday, August 30, 6:00 pm

Sheet 1	1	2	3	4	5	6	7	8	Final
(Alberta) (Ontario) Gray-Withers / Pietrangelo	0	2	0	2	0	2	1	X	7
(Alberta) Cinnamon / Tao 🔨	2	0	1	0	1	0	0	X	4

Sheet 2	1	2	3	4	5	6	7	8	Final
(Ontario) Smith / Niepage 🔨	0	0	0	2	2	1	0	2	7
(Ontario) Bailey / Sipura	2	1	1	0	0	0	1	0	5

Sheet 3	1	2	3	4	5	6	7	8	Final
(New Brunswick) Wynter / Sallaj 🔨	1	0	0	1	0	1	1	1	5
(New Brunswick) Campbell / Carr	0	1	1	0	1	0	0	0	3

Sheet 4	1	2	3	4	5	6	7	8	Final
(Ontario) Ideson / Henry 🔨	0	1	0	2	2	0	X	X	5
(Alberta) Burgess / Morin	4	0	4	0	0	3	X	X	11

Sheet 5	1	2	3	4	5	6	7	8	Final
(Alberta) Wheatcroft / Naugler 🔨	0	0	2	0	1	1	0	X	4
(Alberta) Richards / Davies	1	1	0	4	0	0	4	X	10

Sheet 6	1	2	3	4	5	6	7	8	Final
(Manitoba) Arbuckle / Macdonell	0	2	2	0	1	1	1	X	7
(Ontario) Mallett / Jackson 🔨	2	0	0	2	0	0	0	X	4

Sheet 7	1	2	3	4	5	6	7	8	Final
(Alberta) Raniseth / Crough	0	0	2	2	0	1	0	X	5
(British Columbia) Mackenzie / Middleton 🔨	1	1	0	0	6	0	1	X	9

Sheet 8	1	2	3	4	5	6	7	8	Final
(Ontario) Cave / King 🔨	3	0	3	0	2	0	X	X	8
(Newfoundland and Labrador) Neary / Hancock	0	2	0	1	0	1	X	X	4

Sheet 9	1	2	3	4	5	6	7	8	Final
(New Brunswick) Watson / Beland	1	1	0	4	0	0	2	X	8
(Alberta) Yarmuch / Sawiak 🔨	0	0	1	0	1	1	0	X	3

Sheet 10	1	2	3	4	5	6	7	8	Final
(Alberta) Ryhorchuk / Peterson 🔨	2	0	1	0	1	0	3	1	8
(Alberta) Duncan / Keenan	0	1	0	1	0	1	0	0	3

=== Playoffs ===
Quarterfinals
1	(Alberta) (Ontario) Gray-Withers / Pietrangelo	7
8	(Alberta) Richards / Davies	3
4	(Newfoundland and Labrador) Neary / Hancock	4
5	(Alberta) Ryhorchuk / Peterson	11
2	(Ontario) Cave / King	9
7	(Ontario) Smith / Niepage	6
3	(Alberta) Burgess / Morin	10
6	(British Columbia) Mackenzie / Middleton	4

Semifinals
1	(Alberta) (Ontario) Gray-Withers / Pietrangelo	9
5	(Alberta) Ryhorchuk / Peterson	1
2	(Ontario) Cave / King	7
3	(Alberta) Burgess / Morin	5

Final
1	(Alberta) (Ontario) Gray-Withers / Pietrangelo	8
2	(Ontario) Cave / King	2

==== Quarterfinals ====
Sunday, August 31, 9:00 am

Sheet 4	1	2	3	4	5	6	7	8	Final
(Alberta) (Ontario) Gray-Withers / Pietrangelo 🔨	3	1	2	0	1	0	0	X	7
(Alberta) Richards / Davies	0	0	0	1	0	1	1	X	3

Sheet 5	1	2	3	4	5	6	7	8	Final
(Newfoundland and Labrador) Neary / Hancock 🔨	1	0	0	1	0	2	0	X	4
(Alberta) Ryhorchuk / Peterson	0	3	1	0	5	0	2	X	11

Sheet 6	1	2	3	4	5	6	7	8	Final
(Ontario) Cave / King 🔨	3	0	2	0	0	4	0	X	9
(Ontario) Smith / Niepage	0	2	0	2	1	0	1	X	6

Sheet 7	1	2	3	4	5	6	7	8	Final
(Alberta) Burgess / Morin 🔨	4	1	0	3	0	1	1	X	10
(British Columbia) Mackenzie / Middleton	0	0	1	0	3	0	0	X	4

==== Semifinals ====
Sunday, August 31, 12:30 pm

Sheet 5	1	2	3	4	5	6	7	8	Final
(Ontario) Cave / King 🔨	3	0	2	0	1	0	0	1	7
(Alberta) Burgess / Morin	0	1	0	1	0	2	1	0	5

Sheet 7	1	2	3	4	5	6	7	8	Final
(Alberta) (Ontario) Gray-Withers / Pietrangelo 🔨	2	2	0	2	1	2	X	X	9
(Alberta) Ryhorchuk / Peterson	0	0	1	0	0	0	X	X	1

==== Final ====
Sunday, August 31, 4:00 pm

Sheet 6	1	2	3	4	5	6	7	8	Final
(Alberta) (Ontario) Gray-Withers / Pietrangelo 🔨	2	0	3	1	0	2	X	X	8
(Ontario) Cave / King	0	1	0	0	1	0	X	X	2
