= 2025 Ontario Tankard =

Canadian mens provincial curling championship

- Host city: Cobourg, Ontario
- Arena: Cobourg Community Centre
- Dates: January 19–26
- Winner: Team Mooibroek
- Curling club: Whitby CC, Whitby
- Skip: Sam Mooibroek
- Third: Ryan Wiebe
- Second: Scott Mitchell
- Lead: Nathan Steele
- Coach: Jake Higgs
- Finalist: Scott Howard

The 2025 Men's Ontario Curling Championship, better known as the Ontario Tankard was held from January 19 to 26 at Cobourg Community Centre in Cobourg, Ontario. It serves as the provincial men's curling championship for Southern Ontario. The winning Sam Mooibroek rink will represent Ontario at the 2025 Montana's Brier, Canada's national men's curling championship in Kelowna, British Columbia. The event was held in conjunction with the 2025 Ontario Women's Curling Championship, the provincial women's championship. Both events are held together in non-Winter Olympic years.

Cobourg was chosen as the host community in June 2024. It last hosted the Tankard in 2017.

== Qualification process ==
Twelve teams will qualify for the 2025 Ontario Tankard. The top eight southern Ontario teams on the Canada Team Ranking System as of December 16, 2024 qualified, as well as four teams from an open qualifier.

Qualification method	Berths	Qualifying team(s)
CTRS standings	8	Sam Mooibroek; Scott Howard; Mark Kean; Jayden King; Alex Champ; Jonathan Beuk; Landan Rooney; Kibo Mulima
Open Qualifier	4	Brent Ross; Pat Ferris; Brett Lyon-Hatcher; Travis Fanset

== Teams ==
The teams are listed as follows:

Skip	Third	Second	Lead	Alternate	Coach	Club
Jonathan Beuk	Pat Janssen	David Staples	Scott Chadwick			Cataraqui G&CC, Kingston
Alex Champ	Kevin Flewwelling	Sean Harrison	Zander Elmes			Royal Canadian CC, Toronto
Travis Fanset	Chad Allen	Jay Allen	Mike Walsh	Zack Shurtleff		High Park Club, Toronto
Pat Ferris	Connor Duhaime	Kurt Armstrong	Matt Pretty			Grimsby CC, Grimsby
Scott Howard	Mat Camm	Jason Camm	Tim March	Brad Wood	Glenn Howard	Navan CC, Navan, Ottawa
Mark Kean	Brady Lumley	Matthew Garner	Spencer Dunlop	John Gabel	Matthew Wilkinson	Woodstock CC, Woodstock
Jayden King	Dylan Niepage	Owen Henry	Daniel Del Conte		Jennifer Cuddie	London CC, London
Brett Lyon-Hatcher	Pascal Michaud	Chris Lewis	Benjamin Miskew	Decebal Michaud	Brian Lewis	Rideau CC, Ottawa
Sam Mooibroek	Ryan Wiebe	Scott Mitchell	Nathan Steele		Jake Higgs	Whitby CC, Whitby
Kibo Mulima	Wesley Forget	Wyatt Small	Austin Snyder			KW Granite Club, Waterloo
Landan Rooney	Connor Lawes	Robert Currie	Evan Lilly	David Lawes	Dave Rooney	The CC of Collingwood, Collingwood
Brent Ross	Dayna Deruelle	Ryan Werenich	Shawn Kaufman			Harriston Curling Club, Harriston

=== Map of teams ===
Ontario Tankard Teams

== Knockout Brackets ==
=== A Event ===
First Knockout	Qualifier 1
Sam Mooibroek	8
Kibo Mulima	11	Kibo Mulima	4
Pat Ferris	2	Sam Mooibroek	10
Jonathan Beuk	6
Jayden King	7
Jonathan Beuk	8	Jonathan Beuk	8
Brett Lyon-Hatcher	3	Sam Mooibroek	8
Mark Kean	6
Mark Kean	9
Alex Champ	10	Alex Champ	2
Travis Fanset	1	Mark Kean	11
Scott Howard	8
Scott Howard	12
Landan Rooney	8	Landan Rooney	9
Brent Ross	6

=== B Event ===
Second Knockout	Qualifier 2
Pat Ferris	5
Jayden King	6	Jayden King	2
Scott Howard	8
Scott Howard	9
Brent Ross	3	Jonathan Beuk	1
Alex Champ	8	Alex Champ	3
Jonathan Beuk	6
Scott Howard	8
Travis Fanset	5	Mark Kean	3
Landan Rooney	10	Landan Rooney	7
Brett Lyon-Hatcher	7	Kibo Mulima	6
Kibo Mulima	8	Landan Rooney	7
Mark Kean	10

=== C Event ===
Third Knockout				Qualifier 3
		Landan Rooney	6
Pat Ferris	7	Brent Ross	7
Brent Ross	8			Brent Ross	7
				Jonathan Beuk	8
		Kibo Mulima	7
		Jonathan Beuk	8

Third Knockout	Qualifier 4
Travis Fanset	7
Mark Kean	9
Jayden King	14
Jayden King	7	Jayden King	6
Alex Champ	6
Brett Lyon-Hatcher	4
Alex Champ	9

== Knockout Results ==
All draws are listed in Eastern Time (UTC−05:00).

=== Draw 1 ===
Sunday, January 19, 7:00 pm

Sheet A	1	2	3	4	5	6	7	8	9	10	Final
Jonathan Beuk	0	2	0	1	2	0	0	3	X	X	8
Brett Lyon-Hatcher 🔨	1	0	1	0	0	0	1	0	X	X	3

Sheet B	1	2	3	4	5	6	7	8	9	10	Final
Alex Champ	3	0	7	X	X	X	X	X	X	X	10
Travis Fanset 🔨	0	1	0	X	X	X	X	X	X	X	1

Sheet C	1	2	3	4	5	6	7	8	9	10	Final
Landan Rooney	0	1	2	0	1	0	0	2	0	2	8
Brent Ross 🔨	1	0	0	2	0	2	0	0	1	0	6

Sheet B	1	2	3	4	5	6	7	8	9	10	Final
Kibo Mulima 🔨	1	0	3	0	0	4	0	3	X	X	11
Pat Ferris	0	0	0	0	1	0	1	0	X	X	2

=== Draw 3 ===
Monday, January 20, 7:30 pm

Sheet A	1	2	3	4	5	6	7	8	9	10	Final
Mark Kean 🔨	2	0	0	2	1	0	0	1	3	X	9
Alex Champ	0	1	0	0	0	0	1	0	0	X	2

Sheet B	1	2	3	4	5	6	7	8	9	10	Final
Scott Howard 🔨	2	0	0	1	1	0	3	1	0	4	12
Landan Rooney	0	2	1	0	0	3	0	0	3	0	9

Sheet C	1	2	3	4	5	6	7	8	9	10	Final
Sam Mooibroek	0	2	1	1	0	2	1	0	1	X	8
Kibo Mulima 🔨	1	0	0	0	2	0	0	1	0	X	4

Sheet D	1	2	3	4	5	6	7	8	9	10	11	Final
Jayden King	1	0	0	2	2	0	0	1	0	1	0	7
Jonathan Beuk 🔨	0	2	1	0	0	2	0	0	2	0	1	8

=== Draw 5 ===
Tuesday, January 21, 2:00 pm

Sheet A	1	2	3	4	5	6	7	8	9	10	Final
Pat Ferris 🔨	1	0	0	0	2	0	0	2	0	0	5
Jayden King	0	1	0	1	0	1	1	0	0	2	6

Sheet B	1	2	3	4	5	6	7	8	9	10	Final
Brent Ross	0	1	0	0	0	1	1	0	X	X	3
Alex Champ 🔨	1	0	0	4	1	0	0	2	X	X	8

Sheet C	1	2	3	4	5	6	7	8	9	10	Final
Travis Fanset	0	2	0	1	0	1	0	1	0	X	5
Landan Rooney 🔨	2	0	2	0	1	0	3	0	2	X	10

Sheet D	1	2	3	4	5	6	7	8	9	10	11	Final
Brett Lyon-Hatcher 🔨	2	0	0	0	2	0	1	1	0	1	0	7
Kibo Mulima	0	1	1	1	0	2	0	0	2	0	1	8

=== Draw 7 ===
Wednesday, January 22, 9:00 am

Sheet C	1	2	3	4	5	6	7	8	9	10	11	Final
Pat Ferris	0	0	1	0	1	0	1	0	3	1	0	7
Brent Ross 🔨	1	3	0	0	0	2	0	1	0	0	1	8

=== Draw 8 ===
Wednesday, January 22, 2:00 pm

Sheet B	1	2	3	4	5	6	7	8	9	10	Final
Sam Mooibroek	0	0	2	0	1	0	3	0	2	2	10
Jonathan Beuk 🔨	0	2	0	1	0	2	0	1	0	0	6

Sheet D	1	2	3	4	5	6	7	8	9	10	Final
Mark Kean 🔨	0	1	1	0	2	0	3	0	2	2	11
Scott Howard	1	0	0	1	0	5	0	1	0	0	8

=== Draw 9 ===
Wednesday, January 22, 7:00 pm

Sheet A	1	2	3	4	5	6	7	8	9	10	Final
Landan Rooney 🔨	0	2	0	1	0	1	0	1	0	2	7
Kibo Mulima	0	0	2	0	1	0	1	0	2	0	6

Sheet C	1	2	3	4	5	6	7	8	9	10	Final
Sam Mooibroek 🔨	2	0	3	0	0	2	0	1	0	X	8
Mark Kean	0	1	0	2	1	0	0	0	2	X	6

=== Draw 10 ===
Thursday, January 23, 9:00 am

Sheet C	1	2	3	4	5	6	7	8	9	10	Final
Jayden King 🔨	1	0	0	1	0	0	0	X	X	X	2
Scott Howard	0	3	0	0	2	2	1	X	X	X	8

Sheet D	1	2	3	4	5	6	7	8	9	10	Final
Alex Champ 🔨	0	1	1	0	1	0	0	0	0	X	3
Jonathan Beuk	0	0	0	2	0	3	0	0	1	X	6

=== Draw 11 ===
Thursday, January 23, 2:00 pm

Sheet A	1	2	3	4	5	6	7	8	9	10	Final
Travis Fanset	0	1	0	3	0	2	1	0	0	X	7
Jayden King 🔨	3	0	3	0	1	0	0	2	5	X	14

Sheet B	1	2	3	4	5	6	7	8	9	10	Final
Scott Howard 🔨	2	0	3	4	X	X	X	X	X	X	9
Jonathan Beuk	0	1	0	0	X	X	X	X	X	X	1

Sheet C	1	2	3	4	5	6	7	8	9	10	Final
Brett Lyon-Hatcher 🔨	1	0	0	2	0	1	0	0	0	X	4
Alex Champ	0	2	1	0	0	0	2	3	1	X	9

Sheet D	1	2	3	4	5	6	7	8	9	10	Final
Landan Rooney 🔨	1	0	2	0	0	0	2	2	0	X	7
Mark Kean	0	1	0	1	1	3	0	0	4	X	10

=== Draw 13 ===
Friday, January 24, 9:00 am

Sheet C	1	2	3	4	5	6	7	8	9	10	Final
Scott Howard 🔨	2	0	1	0	1	1	1	0	2	X	8
Mark Kean	0	1	0	1	0	0	0	1	0	X	3

Sheet D	1	2	3	4	5	6	7	8	9	10	Final
Jayden King	1	0	1	0	0	3	0	0	0	2	7
Alex Champ 🔨	0	0	0	2	1	0	2	0	1	0	6

=== Draw 14 ===
Friday, January 24, 2:00 pm

Sheet B	1	2	3	4	5	6	7	8	9	10	Final
Landan Rooney 🔨	1	0	1	0	1	0	0	3	0	0	6
Brent Ross	0	2	0	0	0	1	1	0	2	1	7

Sheet C	1	2	3	4	5	6	7	8	9	10	Final
Kibo Mulima 🔨	0	1	0	2	0	0	1	0	2	1	7
Jonathan Beuk	0	0	1	0	4	0	0	3	0	0	8

=== Draw 16 ===
Saturday, January 25, 9:00 am

Sheet A	1	2	3	4	5	6	7	8	9	10	Final
Brent Ross 🔨	0	3	0	3	0	0	0	0	1	0	7
Jonathan Beuk	0	0	2	0	1	1	1	2	0	1	8

Sheet B	1	2	3	4	5	6	7	8	9	10	Final
Mark Kean	0	2	0	1	2	0	1	0	2	1	9
Jayden King 🔨	1	0	2	0	0	1	0	2	0	0	6

== Playoffs ==
Page playoff system
A	Sam Mooibroek	9
B	Scott Howard	3
C1	Jonathan Beuk	5
C2	Mark Kean	7

Semifinal
B	Scott Howard	7
C2	Mark Kean	3

Final
A	Sam Mooibroek	7
B	Scott Howard	4

=== A vs. B ===
Friday, January 24, 7:00 pm

Sheet B	1	2	3	4	5	6	7	8	9	10	Final
Sam Mooibroek 🔨	1	1	0	1	0	2	0	2	2	X	9
Scott Howard	0	0	0	0	2	0	1	0	0	X	3

=== C1 vs. C2 ===
Saturday, January 25, 2:00 pm

Sheet C	1	2	3	4	5	6	7	8	9	10	Final
Jonathan Beuk	0	2	1	1	0	1	0	0	0	X	5
Mark Kean 🔨	3	0	0	0	1	0	1	2	0	X	7

=== Semifinal ===
Saturday, January 25, 7:00 pm

Sheet B	1	2	3	4	5	6	7	8	9	10	Final
Scott Howard 🔨	0	0	1	2	0	1	1	0	2	X	7
Mark Kean	0	1	0	0	1	0	0	1	0	X	3

=== Final ===
Sunday, January 26, 2:30 pm

Sheet C	1	2	3	4	5	6	7	8	9	10	Final
Sam Mooibroek 🔨	1	2	0	3	0	0	0	1	0	X	7
Scott Howard	0	0	1	0	0	2	0	0	1	X	4

2025 Ontario Tankard

Sam Mooibroek
1st Ontario Provincial Championship title

== Qualification ==
=== Open Qualifier ===
January 3–5, Oakville Curling Club, Oakville

A1 Side	To Tankard
Brent Ross (Harriston)	6
Jacob Lamb (Dundas)	5
Brent Ross	7
Noah Garner (Mississauga)	8	Mike Fournier	5
Christopher Inglis (Dundas)	2	Noah Garner	0
Mike Fournier (Toronto)	9
Brent Ross	8
Brett Lyon-Hatcher (Rideau)	7	Brett Lyon-Hatcher	2
Scott Ray (Tweed)	4	Brett Lyon-Hatcher	10
Rob Ainsley (Toronto)	3
Brett Lyon-Hatcher	7
Warren Smith	6
Daniel Hocevar (Toronto)	3
Matt Dupuis (Cornwall)	7	Warren Smith	4
Warren Smith (Port Elgin)	8

A2 Side	To Tankard
Travis Fanset (High Park)	7
Carter Bryant (Brantford)	1
Travis Fanset	6
Evan MacDougall (Guelph)	9	Evan MacDougall	3
Rob Lobel (Whitby)	4	Evan MacDougall	5
Sam Steep (Waterloo)	2
Travis Fanset	4
Pat Ferris	6
Pat Ferris (Grimsby)	7
Mike McLean (Ottawa)	10	Mike McLean	6
Owen Nicholls (Kitchener)	2	Pat Ferris	6
Greg Balsdon	5
Scott Brandon (Palmerston)	6
Greg Balsdon (Richmond Hill)	8

B1 Side	To Tankard
Brett Lyon-Hatcher	5
Jacob Lamb	4
Greg Balsdon	0
Scott Ray	3	Jacob Lamb	6
Jacob Lamb	5	Jacob Lamb	6
Matt Dupuis	5	Matt Dupuis	4
Noah Garner	1	Jacob Lamb	6
Rob Ainsley	5
Evan MacDougall	5
Rob Ainsley	6
Rob Ainsley	4
Christopher Inglis	6	Christopher Inglis	3
Daniel Hocevar	3

B2 Side	To Tankard
Travis Fanset	7
Mike Fournier	4
Warren Smith	11
Owen Nicholls	4	Sam Steep	6
Carter Bryant	6	Carter Bryant	4
Sam Steep	7
Warren Smith	4
Mike Fournier	5
Mike Fournier	6
Mike McLean	4
Mike McLean	7
Rob Lobel	6	Rob Lobel	4
Scott Brandon	3
