= U18 Ontario Curling Championships =

The U18 Ontario Curling Championships (formerly the Ontario Bantam Curling Championships) is the provincial under-18 men's and women's curling championship for Southern Ontario. The event is organized by Curling Ontario, and the winning teams represent Ontario at the Canadian U18 Curling Championships.

When the event was known as the Ontario Bantam Championships, it was eligible for curlers 16 and under. The event became the U18 championships in 2017.

== Winners - Men ==
Year	Curling Club	Skip	Vice	Second	Lead	Record at Canadian Championship
2026	KW Granite Club	Tyler MacTavish	Aaron Benning	Alec Symeonides	Liam Rowe	(bronze) (8–1)
2025	KW Granite Club	Tyler MacTavish	Liam Rowe	Alec Symeonides	Connor Elkins	(silver) (8–1)
2024	KW Granite Club	Tyler MacTavish	Evan Madore	Nathan Kim	Colsen Flemington	8th (5–4)
2023	London Curling Club	Kyle Stratton	Liam Tardif	Dylan Stockton	Owen Nicholls	15th (2–6)
2022	London Curling Club	Kyle Stratton	Liam Tardif	Matthew Pouget	Brayden Appleby	(bronze) (6–3)
2019	Coldwater & District Curling Club	Dylan Niepage	Sam Hastings	Cameron Vanbodegom	Trey Cowell	(gold) (8–2)
2018	Whitby Curling Club	Joshua Leung	Scott Mitchell	Nathan Steele	Colin Schnurr	T–6th (3-4)
2017	Whitby Curling Club	Hazen Enman	Daniel Van Veghal	Scott Mitchell	Ryan Mitchell	5th (4-4)
2016	Galt Country Club	Sam Mooibroek	Emerson Steffler	Mathew Garner	Spencer Dunlop	N/A
2015	Richmond Curling Club	Michael Morra	Sean Armstrong	Grant Fraser	Mathew Morra	N/A
2014	Mississaugua Golf & Country Club	Jeff Wanless	Joe Hart	Hale Murphy	David Hart	N/A
2013	Stroud Curling Club	Matthew Hall	Phil Malvar	Mackenzie Reid	Cody McGhee	N/A
2012	Sarnia Golf & Curling Club	Doug Kee	Curtis Easter	Zack Shurtleff	Patrick Clarke	N/A
2011	Navan Curling Club	Jason Camm	Curtis Easter	Richard Seto	Geordin Raganold	N/A
2010	St. George's Golf & Country Club	Jack Lindsay	Spencer Nuttall	Ben Bernier	Owen Duhaime	N/A
2009	Richmond Hill Curling Club	Pedro Malvar	Adam Tambosso	Rory James	Ben Bernier	N/A
2008	Westmount Golf & Country Club	Mike Flemming	Brett Dekoning	Dave Mathers	Ian Romansky	N/A
2007	Manotick Curling Centre	Neil Sinclair	Graham Rathwell	Mathew Camm	Andrew Hamilton	N/A
2006	Sydenham Community Curling Club	Matt Mapletoft	Michael McDonald	Chris Liscumb	Chris Jay	N/A
2005	Woodville Curling Club	Ben Willemse	Jake Walker	Daryl Budd	Trevor Harrison	N/A
2004	Winchester Curling Club	Shane Latimer	Phillip Klein-Swormink	Andrew Dings	Geoff Spruit	N/A
2003	Brockville Country Club	Rob Bushfield	Matt Hone	Alex Coon	Andrew McCrae	N/A
2002	Highland Country Club	Andrew Nixon	Jeff Dawson	Scott McDonald	Mick Lizmore	N/A
2001	Sarnia Golf & Curling Club	Mark Bice	Nathan Core	Rob Pruliere	Mark Bresee	N/A
2000	Avonlea Curling Club	Jeff Thomas	Jamie Bishop	Jeffery Bennett	Darren Anderson	N/A
1999	Peterborough Curling Club	John Epping	Mike McLean	Nathan Crawford	John Grant	N/A
1998	RCN (Navy) Curling Club	Sébastien Robillard	Christopher Ciasnocha	Scott McLean	Nickolas Artichuk	N/A

== Winners - Women ==
Year	Curling Club	Skip	Third	Second	Lead	Record At Canadian Championship
2026	Rideau Curling Club	Charlotte Wilson	Amelia Benning	Abigail Rushton	Sydney Anderson	(silver) (7–3)
2025	Huntley Curling Club	Katrina Frlan	Erika Wainwright	Samantha Wall	Lauren Norman	(bronze) (6–3)
2024	Ottawa Hunt and Golf Club	Dominique Vivier	Brooklyn Ideson	Toula Pappas	Sydney Anderson	7th (6–2)
2023	Huntley Curling Club	Katrina Frlan	Erika Wainwright	Isabella McLean	Lauren Norman	16th (4–4)
2022	RCMP Curling Club	Emma Acres	Ava Acres	Liana Flanagan	Mya Sharpe	11th (3–3)
2019	Manotick Curling Centre	Emily Deschenes	Emma Artichuk	Jillian Uniacke	Celeste Gauthier	(silver) (6–4)
2018	Listowel Curling Club	Madelyn Warriner	Sarah Bailey	Brianne Donegan	Shannon Warriner	4th (7-3)
2017	Perth Curling Club	Kayla Gray	Mikayla Gemmill	Chelsea Ferrier	Morgan Typhair	7th (5-3)
2016	Niagara Falls Curling Club	Mackenzie Kiemele	Katie Ford	Cassie Barnard	Megan Ford	N/A
2015	Huntley Curling Club	Kayla MacMillan	Sarah Daviau	Lindsay Dubue	Marcia Richardson	N/A
2014	Huntley Curling Club	Kayla MacMillan	Sarah Daviau	Lindsay Dubue	Marcia Richardson	N/A
2013	Listowel Curling Club	Jestyn Murphy	Leah Will	Riley Sandham	Hilary Nuhn	N/A
2012	Grimsby Curling Club	Chelsea Brandwood	Claire Greenlees	Emily Walsh	Danielle Greenlees	N/A
2011	Huntley Curling Club	Lauren Horton	Jordan Mark	Cassandra Lewin	Jessica Armstrong	N/A
2010	Westmount Golf & Country Club	Kendall Haymes	Margot Flemming	Cassie Savage	Megan Arnold	N/A
2009	Manotick Curling Centre	Jamie Sinclair	Cheryl Kreviazuk	Melissa Gannon	Rebecca Wichers-Schreur	N/A
2008	St. Thomas Curling Club	Sara Westman	Rachelle Vink	Tess Bobbie	Courtney Roblin	N/A
2007	North Grenville Curling Club	Stephanie Brown	Kara Ruiter	Kim Tuor	Jessica Gannon	N/A
2006	City View Curling Club	Rachel Homan	Emma Miskew	Lynn Kreviazuk	Jamie Sinclair	N/A
2005	City View Curling Club	Rachel Homan	Emma Miskew	Alison Kreviazuk	Nicole Johnston	N/A
2004	City View Curling Club	Rachel Homan	Emma Miskew	Alison Kreviazuk	Nicole Johnston	N/A
2003	Rideau Curling Club	Rachel Homan	Emma Miskew	Alison Kreviazuk	Nicole Johnston	N/A
2002	Unionville Curling Club	Hollie Nicol	Kim Brown	Sarah Noorden	Jackie Masonsong	N/A
2001	Palmerston Curling Club	Stephanie Gray	Lindsey Wilson	Jenna Davidson	Amber Gephardt	N/A
2000	Granite Curling Club of West Ottawa	Lee Merklinger	Leslie Levere	Lisa Weagle	Breanne Merklinger	N/A
1999	Oakville Curling Club	Julie Reddick	Leigh Armstrong	Stephanie Hanna	Kelli Young	N/A
1998	Burlington	Jordan Davies				N/A
