= Victor Pietrangelo =

Canadian curler

- Curler
- Born: September 22, 2002 (age 24); Niagara Falls, Ontario

Team
- Curling club: Niagara Falls CC, Niagara Falls, ON
- Skip: Jayden King
- Third: Dylan Niepage
- Second: Owen Henry
- Lead: Victor Pietrangelo
- Mixed doubles partner: Serena Gray-Withers

Curling career
- Member Association: Ontario
- Brier: 1 (2026)
- World Mixed Doubles Championship: 1 (2027)
- Top CTRS ranking: 7th (2025–26)
Medal record
Curling
Representing Canada
World University Games
Bronze medal – third place	2025 Turin	Mixed doubles
Representing Ontario
Canadian Mixed Doubles Championship
Gold medal – first place	2026 Surrey	Mixed doubles

Victor Pietrangelo (born September 21, 2002) is a Canadian curler from Niagara Falls, Ontario. He currently plays lead on Team Jayden King. He also plays mixed doubles with Serena Gray-Withers.

== Career ==
=== Men's ===
Pietrangelo joined the Jayden King rink at lead for the 2025–26 season with third Dylan Niepage and second Owen Henry. To begin, the team competed in the 2025 U25 NextGen Classic where they were eliminated by Jordon McDonald in the semifinals. They then played in the 2025 KW Fall Classic where they had an undefeated run up until the final where they lost to Italy's Joël Retornaz. The team then had a pair of quarterfinal losses at the 2025 Masters Tier 2 Grand Slam event and 2025 Stu Sells Toronto Tankard, falling to Daniel Casper and Magnus Ramsfjell respectively. In October, the team participated in the 2025 Canadian Olympic Curling Pre-Trials, qualifying as the eighth seeds after Team Reid Carruthers declined their invitation. There, the team had an impressive showing, going 4–3 and just missing the playoffs. They bounced back with back-to-back finals appearances at the Broken Broom Tobacco Belt Cash Spiel and Stu Sells Living Waters Collingwood Classic, losing to Mark Kean and Scott Howard. In January, the team played in the 2026 Ontario Tankard where they entered as the top seeds. After qualifying for the playoffs through the A bracket, they lost the 1 vs. 2 game to Sam Mooibroek. They then beat Mark Kean in the semifinal to set up a rematch against Mooibroek in the final. Tied in the ninth end, the team scored two points before stealing in the tenth end to win the game 9–6, capturing the Ontario Tankard title and sending them to the 2026 Montana's Brier in St. John's, Newfoundland and Labrador. At the Brier, Team King finished the round robin with a 5–3 record, enough to qualify for the championship round. They then lost to Brad Gushue 12–6 in the page qualifier and were eliminated.

=== Mixed Doubles ===
In 2024, Pietrangelo would win the FISU World Mixed Doubles Qualifier with Jessica Zheng, going undefeated throughout the tournament.

In 2025, Pietrangelo and Zheng would compete in the 2025 Winter World University Games where they would finish the round robin with a 6–1 record, before claiming the bronze medal.

For the 2025–26 season, Pietrangelo joined forces with Serena Gray-Withers of Alberta to form a new team. This pair had a strong start to the season, winning the 2025 U25 NextGen Classic with an undefeated 8–0 record. They then played in the Saville Mixed Doubles Classic where they had an undefeated run until the final, losing to eventual Olympic silver medalists Cory Thiesse and Korey Dropkin. In March, the duo played in the 2026 Canadian Mixed Doubles Curling Championship after earning enough points to qualify through the Canadian Mixed Doubles rankings. Through the round robin, the pair finished with a 4–2 record, enough to qualify for the knockout round. After beating Nancy Martin and Rylan Kleiter in the round of 12, they came from behind in both their quarterfinal and semifinal matches to eliminate Kira Brunton and Jacob Horgan and Rachel Homan and Brendan Bottcher. This qualified them for the championship game against Zoe Cinnamon and Johnson Tao where Pietrangelo and Gray-Withers gave up six points in the first end. Despite this, the pair pulled off their third straight come from behind victory, scoring three in the eighth end to win the game 10–9 and earn the right to represent Canada at the 2027 World Mixed Doubles Curling Championship.

To start the 2026–27 season, Pietrangelo and Gray-Withers lost in a rematch to Cinnamon and Tao in the final of the U25 NextGen Classic.

== Personal life ==
Pietrangelo attended Brock University. He is employed as an audit staff accountant at KPMG.
