= Stu Sells Living Waters Collingwood Classic =

Annual curling tournament

- Established: 2012
- Host city: Collingwood, Ontario
- Arena: Collingwood Curling Club
- Men's purse: $25,000
- Women's purse: $7,750

Current champions (2025)
- Men: (Ontario) Scott Howard
- Women: (Ontario) Krista Scharf

Location in Canada

The Stu Sells Living Waters Collingwood Classic, formerly the Stu Sells Cookstown Classic, and the CookstownCash presented by Comco Canada Inc. is an annual curling tournament that was part of the World Curling Tour, the highest-level curling tour in the world. The event was introduced in 2012 and was held on the first weekend in November, at the Cookstown Curling Club in Cookstown, Ontario. The event was moved to the Collingwood Curling Club in Collingwood, Ontario in 2023. Originally just part of the Ontario Curling Tour, it was part of the World Curling Tour from 2014 to 2017. After a five-year pause, the event returned in 2022 as part of the Stu Sells series.

== Past champions ==
=== Men ===
Year	Winning team	Runner up team	Purse (CAD)
2012	(Ontario) Pat Ferris, Andrew Fairfull, Craig Fairfull, Rob Larmer	(Ontario) Dennis Moretto, Paul Attard, Howard Steele, Mike Nelson	$12,000
2013	(Ontario) Peter Corner, Graeme McCarrel, Scott Foster, Ken McDermot	(Alberta) Charley Thomas, Colin Hodgson, Matthew Ng, Mike Westlund	$14,500
2014	(Ontario) Pat Ferris, Andrew Fairfull, Craig Fairfull, Nathan Small	(Prince Edward Island) Adam Casey, Josh Barry, Viktor Kjäll, Robbie Doherty	$22,500
2015	(Switzerland) Benoît Schwarz, Claudio Pätz, Peter de Cruz, Valentin Tanner	(Ontario) Brent Ross, Adam Spencer, Ryan Werenich, Shawn Kaufman	$21,835
2016	(Ontario) John Epping, Mathew Camm, Patrick Janssen, Tim March	(Switzerland) Benoît Schwarz, Claudio Pätz, Peter de Cruz (skip), Valentin Tanner	$22,500
2017	(Ontario) Mark Kean, Colin Dow, Brad Kidd, Scott Brandon	(Ontario) Tanner Horgan, Jacob Horgan, Nicholas Bissonnette, Maxime Blais	$11,200
2022	(Ontario) Alex Champ, Charlie Richard, Terry Arnold, Scott Clinton	(Ontario) Pat Ferris, Connor Lawes, Connor Duhaime, Robert Currie, Evan Lilly	$14,000
2023	(Ontario) John Epping, Aaron Squires, Pat Janssen, Jason Camm	(Ontario) Sam Mooibroek, Scott Mitchell, Nathan Steele, Colin Schnurr	$14,000
2024	(Ontario) John Epping, Jacob Horgan, Tanner Horgan, Ian McMillan	(Switzerland) Michael Brunner, Anthony Petoud, Romano Meier, Andreas Gerlach	$25,000
2025	(Ontario) Scott Howard, Mat Camm, Jason Camm, Scott Chadwick	(Ontario) Jayden King, Dylan Niepage, Owen Henry, Victor Pietrangelo	$25,000

=== Women ===
Year	Winning team	Runner up team	Purse (CAD)
2013	(Ontario) Heather Graham, Margie Hewitt, Amy Balsdon, Abbie Darnley	(Ontario) Sarah Picton, Lynne Flegel, Claire Archer, Marit Lee	$6,000
2014	(United States) Patti Lank, Maureen Stolt, Anna Bauman, Madisson Lank	(Ontario) Marilyn Bodogh, Colleen Madonia, Jane Hooper-Perroud	$7,400
2015	(Ontario) Julie Tippin, Chantal Lalonde, Rachelle Vink, Tessa Bobbie	(Sweden) Anna Hasselborg, Sara McManus, Agnes Knochenhauer, Sofia Mabergs	$6,200
2016	(Ontario) Heather Heggestad, Ginger Coyle, Michelle Smith, Lauren Harrison	(Ontario) Mallory Kean, Carly Howard, Kerilynn Mathers, Megan Arnold	$5,400
2024	(Ontario) Krista McCarville, Andrea Kelly, Kendra Lilly, Ashley Sippala	(Ontario) Hollie Duncan, Megan Balsdon, Rachelle Strybosch, Tess Guyatt	$25,000
2025	(Ontario) Krista Scharf, Kendra Lilly, Ashley Sippala, Sarah Potts	(Ontario) Krysta Burns, Maddy Warriner, Sara Guy, Laura Masters	$7,750
