= Scott Mitchell (curler) =

Canadian curler

- Curler
- Born: July 4, 2001 (age 25); Pickering, Ontario

Team
- Curling club: Whitby CC, Whitby, ON
- Skip: Sam Mooibroek
- Third: Owen Purcell
- Second: Scott Mitchell
- Lead: Gavin Lydiate

Curling career
- Member Association: Ontario (2016–2019; 2021–present); Northern Ontario (2019–2020); Nova Scotia (2020–2021)
- Brier: 1 (2025)
- Top CTRS ranking: 9th (2024–25)
Medal record
Men's curling
Representing Canada
World Junior Championships
| Bronze medal – third place | 2022 Jönköping |

Scott Mitchell (born July 4, 2001, in Pickering) is a Canadian curler from Whitby, Ontario. He currently plays second on Team Sam Mooibroek.

== Career ==
=== Juniors ===
Mitchell won back-to-back U18 Ontario Curling Championships in 2017 and 2018 as a member of the Hazen Enman and Joshua Leung rinks respectively. Participating in the newly created Canadian U18 Curling Championships, Mitchell and his team just missed the playoffs at the 2017 Canadian U18 Curling Championships with a 4–4 record, placing fifth. The following year at the 2018 Canadian U18 Curling Championships, his team did not fare much better, being eliminated with a 3–4 record in seventh place. After aging out of U18s, Mitchell began attending Cambrian College in Sudbury and joined the Jacob Horgan rink at third. With Horgan and front-end players Mitchell Cortello and Chase Dusessoy, the team won the Northern Ontario junior provincial, sending them to the 2020 Canadian Junior Curling Championships in Langley, British Columbia. There, the team missed the playoffs with a 2–4 record and finished eleventh after a 1–2 record in the seeding pool.

For the 2020–21 season, Mitchell moved east to join the Graeme Weagle rink out of Halifax, Nova Scotia. Due to the COVID-19 pandemic, both the Nova Scotia and Canadian junior championships were cancelled. Mitchell then moved back to Ontario the following year and formed his own rink with Landan Rooney, Nathan Steele and Austin Snyder. This team was selected to compete at the 2021 World Junior Qualification Event which was held as a replacement to the junior championship. There, they finished 4–1 in the round robin to earn a bye to the semifinals where they lost to Newfoundland and Labrador's Nathan Young. In December 2021, Team Mitchell won the cash spiel qualifier for the 2022 Ontario Tankard, sending them to their first provincial men's championship. There, they finished 3–3 and fell short of reaching the playoffs. Later that season, Rooney took over as skip of the team and won the Ontario U-21 Curling Championships, qualifying the team for the 2022 Canadian Junior Curling Championships where Mitchell joined them as their alternate. There, the team finished 7–1 through the round robin and won all three of their playoff games to win the Canadian championship. This earned them the right to represent Canada at the 2023 World Junior Curling Championships the following year. Before this, however, Mitchell joined the Owen Purcell rink as their alternate for the 2022 World Junior Curling Championships in May 2022. Through the round robin, the team finished with a 6–3 record to earn a playoff berth. They then lost the semifinal to Germany's Benny Kapp, but bounced back to beat Norway's Grunde Buraas to claim the bronze medal.

With Steele too old to compete in the 2023 world junior championship, Mitchell took his place in the lineup at third. As they won the Canadian junior championship the year prior, Team Rooney was invited to compete in the 2022 PointsBet Invitational. There, they lost 11–3 to Brendan Bottcher in the opening round. In February 2023, the team played in the 2023 World Junior Curling Championships in Füssen, Germany. After losing their first three games, they were never able to recover, finishing eighth in the standings with a 3–6 record and relegating Canada to the "B" championship for 2024.

=== Men's ===
While competing with Rooney's junior rink, Mitchell and Steele were also playing on tour with their men's team of Sam Mooibroek and Colin Schnurr. This rink saw immediate success by winning the U25 NextGen Classic, though Mitchell was replaced by alternate Connor Deane for the event. They also reached the final of the Gord Carroll Curling Classic where they lost to Luc Violette. After qualifying for the 2023 Ontario Tankard through the Trillium U25 Series, they went 3–2 in the round robin and missed the playoffs. They ended the year with an undefeated run to win the St. Catharines Golf & CC Cash Spiel.

Team Mooibroek reached the final of the NextGen Classic again in 2023, however, were defeated by Rylan Kleiter in the final. With their points accumulated from the past season, the team qualified for the 2023 Tour Challenge Tier 2 Grand Slam event where they finished 1–3. Following the Slam, Team Mooibroek reached four consecutive tour finals at the Stu Sells 1824 Halifax Classic, the Stu Sells Living Waters Collingwood Classic, the Stu Sells Brantford Nissan Classic and the Comco Cash Spiel, however, only won the latter. They also qualified through the A event of the 2023 Western Showdown after defeating world number five ranked Yannick Schwaller but were then taken out by the Swiss team in the quarterfinals. Entering the 2024 Ontario Tankard as the top ranked team, the Mooibroek rink lost all three qualifying matches in the triple knockout and were eliminated before the playoffs. Colin Schnurr stepped back from competitive curling after the season and was replaced by Ryan Wiebe. He slotted in at third while Mitchell and Steele moved to second and lead respectively.

After finishing the previous season ranked eleventh on the CTRS standings, Team Mooibroek qualified for the 2024 PointsBet Invitational. There, they lost to Team Kleiter 5–2 in the opening round. Elsewhere on tour, the team made it to the semifinals of the 2024 Tour Challenge Tier 2 where they were again taken out by Kleiter. For a second straight year, they lost in the final of the Stu Sells 1824 Halifax Classic, this time to Jeong Byeong-jin of Korea. In December 2024, they won the Stu Sells Brantford Nissan Classic for a second time, defeating Jonathan Beuk in the final. In the new year, the team again entered the 2025 Ontario Tankard as the top ranked team and went undefeated to capture the Ontario provincial title. In the final, they defeated the defending champion Scott Howard 7–4, earning the right to represent Ontario at the 2025 Montana's Brier in Kelowna, British Columbia. At the Brier, the Mooibroek rink would finish the round robin at 4–4, just missing out on the playoffs.

Team Mooibroek would start the 2025–26 curling season off strong, winning the 2025 U25 NextGen Classic 6–4 over Manitoba's Jordon McDonald. This granted the Mooibroek rink a spot in Curling Canada's new national "NextGen Program" for the 2025–26 curling season, which included $6,000 in program funding and access to Curling Canada's National Coaches, among other benefits. Team Mooibroek would also participate in the Tier 2 Masters Grand Slam event, where they would lose in the quarterfinals to Kevin Koe. Their success over the previous two seasons would qualify Mooibroek to the 2025 Canadian Olympic Curling Pre-Trials, where they would finish round robin play at 3–4, finishing in 6th place.

== Personal life ==
Mitchell is employed as a plumbing apprentice at W. Mitchell and Son. He previously attended Cambrian College. His father Collin Mitchell won silver at the 1998 Winter Olympics and was his coach throughout his junior career.

== Teams ==
| Season | Skip | Third | Second | Lead |
|---|---|---|---|---|
| 2016–17 | Hazen Enman | Daniel Vanveghel | Scott Mitchell | Ryan Mitchell |
| 2017–18 | Joshua Leung | Scott Mitchell | Nathan Steele | Colin Schnurr |
| 2018–19 | Joey Hart | Scott Mitchell | Nathan Steele | David Hart |
| 2019–20 | Jacob Horgan | Scott Mitchell | Mitchell Cortello | Chase Dusessoy |
| 2020–21 | Owen Purcell (Fourth) | Scott Mitchell | Graeme Weagle (Skip) | Scott Weagle |
| 2021–22 | Scott Mitchell | Landan Rooney | Nathan Steele | Austin Snyder |
| 2022–23 | Sam Mooibroek | Scott Mitchell | Nathan Steele | Colin Schnurr |
| 2022–23 | Landan Rooney | Scott Mitchell | Jacob Jones | Austin Snyder |
| 2023–24 | Sam Mooibroek | Scott Mitchell | Nathan Steele | Colin Schnurr |
| 2024–25 | Sam Mooibroek | Ryan Wiebe | Scott Mitchell | Nathan Steele |
| 2025–26 | Sam Mooibroek | Ryan Wiebe | Scott Mitchell | Nathan Steele |
| 2026–27 | Sam Mooibroek | Owen Purcell | Scott Mitchell | Gavin Lydiate |
