= Nathan Steele =

Canadian curler (born 2001)

- Curler
- Born: May 9, 2001 (age 25); Toronto, Ontario

Team
- Curling club: Whitby CC, Whitby, ON
- Skip: Jason Camm
- Third: Sam Wills
- Second: Wyatt Small
- Lead: Nathan Steele

Curling career
- Member Association: Ontario
- Brier: 1 (2025)
- Top CTRS ranking: 9th (2024–25)

Nathan Steele (born May 9, 2001, in Toronto) is a Canadian curler from Port Perry, Ontario. He currently plays lead on Team Jason Camm. He is a former Canadian Junior champion.

== Career ==
=== Juniors ===
Steele won the U18 Ontario Curling Championships in 2018 as second for the Joshua Leung rink. At the 2018 Canadian U18 Curling Championships, his team of Leung, Scott Mitchell and Colin Schnurr reached the playoffs with a 3–2 record. They then lost both of their championship round games, eliminating them in seventh place. After aging out of U18s, the team brought on new skip Owen Purdy with Leung going to third and Mitchell moving to Northern Ontario. In their first season together, the team was successful in capturing the Ontario junior provincial title, defeating Jordan McNamara in the final. This sent them to the 2020 Canadian Junior Curling Championships in Langley, British Columbia. There, the team missed the playoffs with a 2–4 record but won all three of their seeding pool games to finish in tenth with a 5–4 record.

After most of the 2020–21 season was cancelled due to the COVID-19 pandemic, Steele joined the newly formed Scott Mitchell rink for the 2021–22 season with third Landan Rooney and lead Austin Snyder. This team was selected to compete at the 2021 World Junior Qualification Event which was held as a replacement to the Canadian junior championship that was cancelled the season prior. There, they finished 4–1 in the round robin to earn a bye to the semifinals where they lost to Newfoundland and Labrador's Nathan Young. In December 2021, Team Mitchell won the cash spiel qualifier for the 2022 Ontario Tankard, sending them to their first provincial men's championship. There, they finished 3–3 and fell short of reaching the playoffs. Later that season, Rooney took over as skip of the team with Steele moving to third and Mitchell moving to alternate. With Jacob Jones and Snyder on the front-end, they won the Ontario junior title, qualifying them for the 2022 Canadian Junior Curling Championships. There, the team finished 7–1 through the round robin and won all three of their playoff games to win the Canadian championship. This earned them the right to represent Canada at the 2023 World Junior Curling Championships the following year, however, as Steele was over the age limit for the event, Mitchell took his place in the lineup. He did still travel with the team to the world championship as a member of their support team for the event. There, the team finished eighth in the standings with a 3–6 record, relegating Canada to the "B" championship for 2024.

=== Men's ===
While competing with Rooney's junior rink, Steele and Mitchell were also playing on tour with their men's team of Sam Mooibroek and Colin Schnurr. This rink saw immediate success by winning the U25 NextGen Classic. They also reached the final of the Gord Carroll Curling Classic where they lost to Luc Violette. After qualifying for the 2023 Ontario Tankard through the Trillium U25 Series, they went 3–2 in the round robin and missed the playoffs. They ended the year with an undefeated run to win the St. Catharines Golf & CC Cash Spiel.

Team Mooibroek reached the final of the NextGen Classic again in 2023, however, were defeated by Rylan Kleiter in the final. With their points accumulated from the past season, the team qualified for the 2023 Tour Challenge Tier 2 Grand Slam event where they finished 1–3. Following the Slam, Team Mooibroek reached four consecutive tour finals at the Stu Sells 1824 Halifax Classic, the Stu Sells Living Waters Collingwood Classic, the Stu Sells Brantford Nissan Classic and the Comco Cash Spiel, however, only won the latter. They also qualified through the A event of the 2023 Western Showdown after defeating world number five ranked Yannick Schwaller but were then taken out by the Swiss team in the quarterfinals. Entering the 2024 Ontario Tankard as the top ranked team, the Mooibroek rink lost all three qualifying matches in the triple knockout and were eliminated before the playoffs. Colin Schnurr stepped back from competitive curling after the season and was replaced by Ryan Wiebe. He slotted in at third while Mitchell and Steele moved to second and lead respectively.

After finishing the previous season ranked eleventh on the CTRS standings, Team Mooibroek qualified for the 2024 PointsBet Invitational. There, they lost to Team Kleiter 5–2 in the opening round. Elsewhere on tour, the team made it to the semifinals of the 2024 Tour Challenge Tier 2 where they were again taken out by Kleiter. For a second straight year, they lost in the final of the Stu Sells 1824 Halifax Classic, this time to Jeong Byeong-jin of Korea. In December 2024, they won the Stu Sells Brantford Nissan Classic for a second time, defeating Jonathan Beuk in the final. In the new year, the team again entered the 2025 Ontario Tankard as the top ranked team and went undefeated to capture the Ontario provincial title. In the final, they defeated the defending champion Scott Howard 7–4, earning the right to represent Ontario at the 2025 Montana's Brier in Kelowna, British Columbia. At the Brier, the Mooibroek rink would finish the round robin at 4–4, just missing out on the playoffs.

Team Mooibroek would start the 2025–26 curling season off strong, winning the 2025 U25 NextGen Classic 6–4 over Manitoba's Jordon McDonald. This granted the Mooibroek rink a spot in Curling Canada's new national "NextGen Program" for the 2025–26 curling season, which included $6,000 in program funding and access to Curling Canada's National Coaches, among other benefits. Team Mooibroek would also participate in the Tier 2 Masters Grand Slam event, where they would lose in the quarterfinals to Kevin Koe. Their success over the previous two seasons would qualify Mooibroek to the 2025 Canadian Olympic Curling Pre-Trials, where they would finish round robin play at 3–4, finishing in 6th place.

== Personal life ==
He is employed as a plumbing apprentice at W. Mitchell and Son. He previously attended Georgian College. His sister Rachel Steele is also a curler.

== Teams ==
| Season | Skip | Third | Second | Lead |
|---|---|---|---|---|
| 2016–17 | Joshua Leung | Andrew Morra | Nathan Steele | Colin Schnurr |
| 2017–18 | Joshua Leung | Scott Mitchell | Nathan Steele | Colin Schnurr |
| 2018–19 | Joey Hart | Scott Mitchell | Nathan Steele | David Hart |
| 2019–20 | Owen Purdy | Joshua Leung | Nathan Steele | Colin Schnurr |
| 2020–21 | Owen Purdy | Joshua Leung | Nathan Steele | Colin Schnurr |
| 2021–22 | Scott Mitchell | Landan Rooney | Nathan Steele | Austin Snyder |
| 2021–22 | Landan Rooney | Nathan Steele | Jacob Jones | Austin Snyder |
| 2022–23 | Sam Mooibroek | Scott Mitchell | Nathan Steele | Colin Schnurr |
| 2023–24 | Sam Mooibroek | Scott Mitchell | Nathan Steele | Colin Schnurr |
| 2024–25 | Sam Mooibroek | Ryan Wiebe | Scott Mitchell | Nathan Steele |
| 2025–26 | Sam Mooibroek | Ryan Wiebe | Scott Mitchell | Nathan Steele |
| 2026–27 | Jason Camm | Sam Wills | Wyatt Small | Nathan Steele |
