= Stu Sells Port Elgin Superspiel =

The Stu Sells Port Elgin Superspiel is a bonspiel part of the men's Ontario Curling Tour. The event was previously held in January but was moved to November and became part of the OCT beginning in 2012. The event takes place at the Port Elgin Curling Club in Port Elgin, Ontario.

== Past Champions ==
| Year | Winning skip | Runner up skip | Purse (CAD) |
|---|---|---|---|
| 2012 | (Ontario) Len Rominger | (Ontario) Al Hutchinson | $18,000 |
| 2013 | (Ontario) Daryl Shane | (Ontario) Roy Arndt | $18,000 |
| 2014 | (Ontario) Peter Mellor | (Ontario) Roy Arndt | $18,000 |
| 2015 | (Ontario) Dayna Deruelle | (Ontario) Wayne Tuck Jr. | $18,000 |
| 2016 | (Ontario) Dayna Deruelle | (Ontario) Peter Mellor | $18,000 |
| 2017 | (Ontario) Wayne Tuck Jr. | (Ontario) Dayna Deruelle | $12,300 |
| 2018 | (Ontario) Cory Heggestad | (Ontario) Mark Bice | $18,000 |
| 2019 | (Ontario) Mark Kean | (Ontario) Richard Krell | $13,220 |
| 2021 | (Ontario) Pat Ferris | (Ontario) Mark Kean | $11,100 |
| 2022 | (Ontario) Alex Champ | (Newfoundland and Labrador) Greg Smith | $11,100 |
| 2023 | (Ontario) Mark Kean | (Ontario) Pat Ferris | $11,100 |
| 2024 | (South Korea) Park Jong-duk | (Ontario) Jayden King | $14,000 |
