= Sam Mooibroek =

Canadian curler (born 1999)

- Curler
- Born: October 9, 1999 (age 27); Kitchener, Ontario

Team
- Curling club: Whitby CC, Whitby, ON
- Skip: Sam Mooibroek
- Third: Owen Purcell
- Second: Scott Mitchell
- Lead: Gavin Lydiate

Curling career
- Member Association: Ontario
- Brier: 1 (2025)
- Top CTRS ranking: 9th (2024–25)

Samuel Vincent Mooibroek (moy-brook) (born October 9, 1999) is a Canadian curler from Kitchener, Ontario.

== Career ==
=== Youth ===
Mooibroek won his first provincial title in 2016 at the U18 Ontario Curling Championships, skipping his own team of Emerson Steffler, Mathew Garner and Spencer Dunlop. With a new lineup the following season, he was unsuccessful in defending his title with the Hazen Enman rink taking first. For his last year of U18, he joined Enman at the third position. The team reached the provincial final where they lost to Joshua Leung, finishing second.

Aged out of U18, Mooibroek reunited with former teammates Garner and Dunlop and brought on new third Ryan Fayaz for the 2018–19 season. With the goal of winning the Ontario U-21 Curling Championships, the team finished second through the round robin with a 5–2 record. After beating Aiden Poole in the semifinal, they reached the final where they gave up steals in the ninth and tenth ends to lose the game 8–7 to Sam Steep. Despite this, they stayed together the following year with Garner and Fayaz switching positions. At provincials, they again qualified for the playoffs with a 4–3 record but were eliminated in the semifinal after a loss to Jordan McNamara, settling for third. In his final year of junior eligibility, the COVID-19 pandemic caused both the Ontario and Canadian junior championships to be cancelled, ending his junior career.

Mooibroek enrolled at Wilfrid Laurier University for the 2021–22 school year. In his first season on the team, he skipped the Wilfrid Laurier Golden Hawks to victory at the Ontario University Athletics championship. Typically, this would have qualified the team for the U Sport championship, however, it was cancelled due to the pandemic. Needing to name a team for the 2023 Winter World University Games, Curling Canada created the 2022 World University Games Qualifier to determine the Canadian representatives for the University Games. At the qualifier, Mooibroek led the Golden Hawks to a 3–2 round robin record, enough to reach the playoffs. After beating the Alberta Golden Bears in the semifinal, the team fell short in the final against the Dalhousie Tigers, finishing second.

Back fulltime for the 2022–23 season, Mooibroek and his teammates defended their title at the OUA championship, defeating Queen's Golden Gaels 6–5 in an extra end final. This sent the team to the 2023 U Sports/Curling Canada University Curling Championships in Sudbury where they topped the round robin standings with a 6–1 record. In the playoffs, they scored four in the tenth end to fend off Queen's 12–10 in the semifinal and then beat Dalhousie 9–7 in the championship game to capture the gold medal. This win gave the team an entry into the 2023 PointsBet Invitational where they lost 10–5 to Matt Dunstone in the Sweep 16. The following season, the team got back on track by winning a third straight OUA title. They went on to finish fourth at the 2024 U Sports/Curling Canada University Curling Championships after playoff losses to both Dalhousie and the University of Alberta.

=== Men's ===
In his first year out of juniors, Mooibroek and his team of Garner, Brady Lumley and Dunlop won the Stu Sells Brantford Nissan Classic, losing just one game en route to claiming the title. They also had a strong performance at the qualifier for the 2022 Ontario Tankard, reaching the semifinals where they lost to Tanner Horgan. As one of the top seven non-qualified teams, Team Mooibroek was invited to the Tankard after the field was extended from nine to twelve teams. There, the team finished 4–2 through the triple knockout bracket, qualifying for the 3 vs. 4 page playoff game where they were eliminated by Jason Camm. The following season, he formed a new team with Scott Mitchell, Nathan Steele and Colin Schnurr. This rink saw immediate success with the team winning their first event, the U25 NextGen Classic. They also reached the final of the Gord Carroll Curling Classic where they lost to Luc Violette. After qualifying for the 2023 Ontario Tankard through the Trillium U25 Series, they went 3–2 in the round robin and missed the playoffs. They ended the year with an undefeated run to win the St. Catharines Golf & CC Cash Spiel.

Team Mooibroek reached the final of the NextGen Classic again in 2023, however, were defeated by Rylan Kleiter in the final. With their points accumulated from the past season, the team qualified for the 2023 Tour Challenge Tier 2 Grand Slam event where they finished 1–3. Following the Slam, Team Mooibroek reached four consecutive tour finals at the Stu Sells 1824 Halifax Classic, the Stu Sells Living Waters Collingwood Classic, the Stu Sells Brantford Nissan Classic and the Comco Cash Spiel, however, only won the latter. They also qualified through the A event of the 2023 Western Showdown after defeating world number five ranked Yannick Schwaller but were then taken out by the Swiss team in the quarterfinals. Entering the 2024 Ontario Tankard as the top ranked team, the Mooibroek rink lost all three qualifying matches in the triple knockout and were eliminated before the playoffs. Colin Schnurr stepped back from competitive curling after the season and was replaced by Ryan Wiebe. He slotted in at third while Mitchell and Steele moved to second and lead respectively.

After finishing the previous season ranked eleventh on the CTRS standings, Team Mooibroek qualified outright for the 2024 PointsBet Invitational. There, they lost to Team Kleiter 5–2 in the opening round. Elsewhere on tour, the team made it to the semifinals of the 2024 Tour Challenge Tier 2 where they were again taken out by Kleiter. For a second straight year, they lost in the final of the Stu Sells 1824 Halifax Classic, this time to Jeong Byeong-jin of Korea. In December 2024, they won the Stu Sells Brantford Nissan Classic for a second time, defeating Jonathan Beuk in the final. In the new year, the team again entered the 2025 Ontario Tankard as the top ranked team and went undefeated to capture the Ontario provincial title. In the final, they defeated the defending champion Scott Howard 7–4, earning the right to represent Ontario at the 2025 Montana's Brier in Kelowna, British Columbia. At the Brier, the Mooibroek rink would finish the round robin at 4–4, just missing out on the playoffs.

Team Mooibroek would start the 2025–26 curling season off strong, winning the 2025 U25 NextGen Classic 6–4 over Manitoba's Jordon McDonald. This granted the Mooibroek rink a spot in Curling Canada's national "NextGen Program" for the 2025–26 curling season, which included $6,000 in program funding and access to Curling Canada's National Coaches, among other benefits. Team Mooibroek would also participate in the Tier 2 Masters Grand Slam event, where they would lose in the quarterfinals to Kevin Koe. Their success over the previous two seasons would qualify Mooibroek to the 2025 Canadian Olympic Curling Pre-Trials, where they would finish round robin play at 3–4, finishing in 6th place.

=== Mixed ===
Mooibroek would skip the Ontario team at the 2025 Canadian Mixed Curling Championship, alongside Emma Artichuk, Wyatt Small, and Jamie Smith. At the national championships, Ontario would finish second after losing to New Brunswick's Rene Comeau 6–5 in the final.

== Personal life ==
Mooibroek is employed as an HVAC sales coordinator for 365 Heating and Cooling. He studied arts at Wilfrid Laurier University. He previously attended Grand River Collegiate Institute.

== Teams ==
Season	Skip	Third	Second	Lead
2015–16	Sam Mooibroek	Emerson Steffler	Matthew Garner	Spencer Dunlop
2016–17	Sam Mooibroek	Brady Lumley	Brandon Holowczak	Spencer Dunlop
2017–18	Hazen Enman	Sam Mooibroek	Trevor Kirby	Charlie Randell
2018–19	Sam Mooibroek	Ryan Fayaz	Matthew Garner	Spencer Dunlop
2019–20	Sam Mooibroek	Matthew Garner	Ryan Fayaz	Spencer Dunlop
2020–21	Sam Mooibroek	Christopher Inglis	Sam Hastings	Charlie Randell
2021–22	Sam Mooibroek	Matthew Garner	Brady Lumley	Spencer Dunlop
2021–22	Sam Mooibroek	Kibo Mulima	Codie Harris	Ben Pearce
2022–23	Sam Mooibroek	Scott Mitchell	Nathan Steele	Colin Schnurr
2022–23	Sam Mooibroek	Kibo Mulima	Wyatt Small	Ben Pearce
2023–24	Sam Mooibroek	Scott Mitchell	Nathan Steele	Colin Schnurr
2023–24	Sam Mooibroek	Kibo Mulima	Wyatt Small	Ben Pearce
2024–25	Sam Mooibroek	Ryan Wiebe	Scott Mitchell	Nathan Steele
2025–26	Sam Mooibroek	Ryan Wiebe	Scott Mitchell	Nathan Steele
2026–27	Sam Mooibroek	Owen Purcell	Scott Mitchell	Gavin Lydiate
