= 2023 Ontario Tankard =

Canadian men's provincial curling championship

- Host city: Port Elgin, Ontario
- Arena: The Plex
- Dates: January 24–29
- Winner: Team McEwen
- Curling club: Royal Canadian CC, Toronto
- Skip: Mike McEwen
- Third: Ryan Fry
- Second: Brent Laing
- Lead: Joey Hart
- Coach: Richard Hart
- Finalist: Glenn Howard

The 2023 Ontario Tankard, (known as the Port Elgin Chrysler 2023 Ontario Tankard Presented by Bruce Power for sponsorship reasons), the provincial men's curling championship for Southern Ontario, was held from January 24 to 29 at The Plex in Port Elgin, Ontario. The winning Mike McEwen rink represented Ontario at the 2023 Tim Hortons Brier on home soil in London, Ontario where they finished fourth place losing in the 3 vs. 4 Page Playoff game to Wild Card #1 6–3.

It was the second straight year that the event was held in Port Elgin. The 2022 event had been subject to COVID-19 restrictions, capping attendance at 500 people per draw, so the organizers requested that CurlON hold the event in Port Elgin again. The event was held in conjunction with the 2023 Ontario Scotties Tournament of Hearts, the provincial women's curling championship, which were held in Thornhill in 2022 (both events are held together in non-Olympic years).

== Qualification process ==
Twelve teams qualified for the 2023 Ontario Tankard. Two teams qualified via their results in the "Grand Slam" series events (2022 PointsBet Invitational, 2022 National, 2022 Tour Challenge, 2022 Masters). Two teams qualified via their results in the Trillium Tour '1000' series events (Stu Sells Toronto Tankard, Capital Curling Classic, Stroud Sleeman Cash Spiel, Tour Challenge Tier 2, Stu Sells Brantford Nissan Classic). Three teams qualified via their results in the Trillium Tour '500' series events (Gord Carroll Curling Classic, KW Fall Classic, Capital Curling Fall Open, St. Thomas Curling Classic, Comco Cash Spiel, Stu Sells Port Elgin Superspiel, Capital Curling Rideau Open, Stu Sells Cookstown Classic, plus the aforementioned 1000 events). One team (restricted to curlers under the age of 25) qualified via their results in the aforementioned Trillium Tour events, plus the CurlON 250 Event #1. The remaining four teams qualified via an open qualifier.

Teams

Qualification method	Berths	Qualifying team(s)
Top Grand Slam series teams	2	John Epping; Glenn Howard
Trillium Tour '1,000' Series	2	Pat Ferris; Jason Camm
Trillium Tour '500' Series	3	Alex Champ; John Willsey; Mike Fournier
Trillium Tour '250' Series (Under-25)	1	Sam Mooibroek
Open Qualifier	4	Landan Rooney; Dayna Deruelle; Mike McEwen; Travis Fanset

== Teams ==
The teams are listed as follows:

Skip	Third	Second	Lead	Alternate	Club
Jason Camm	Ian Dickie	Zack Shurtleff	Punit Sthankiya	Donald Bowser	Navan CC, Navan, Ottawa
Alex Champ	Charlie Richard	Terry Arnold	Scott Clinton	Jess Bechard	Westmount G&CC, Kitchener
Dayna Deruelle	Brent Ross	Ryan Werenich	Shawn Kaufman	Andrew Clayton	Harriston CC, Harriston
John Epping	Mathew Camm	Patrick Janssen	Scott Chadwick		Leaside CC, East York, Toronto
Pat Ferris	Connor Lawes	Connor Duhaime	Robert Currie	Evan Lilly	Grimsby CC, Grimsby
Mike Fournier	Kevin Flewwelling	Sean Harrison	Zander Elmes		Leaside CC, East York, Toronto
Glenn Howard	Scott Howard	David Mathers	Tim March	Adam Spencer	Penetanguishene CC, Penetanguishene
Mike McEwen	Ryan Fry	Brent Laing	Joey Hart		Royal Canadian CC, Toronto
Sam Mooibroek	Scott Mitchell	Nathan Steele	Colin Schnurr	Wyatt Small	Whitby CC, Whitby
Landan Rooney	Connor Deane	Jacob Jones	Austin Snyder		Whitby CC, Whitby
Aaron Squires	Travis Fanset	Craig Van Ymeren	Scott Brandon	Chad Allen	St. Thomas CC, St. Thomas
John Willsey	Brady Lumley	Matthew Garner	Spencer Dunlop		Oakville CC, Oakville

== Round-robin standings ==
Final round-robin standings

Key
Teams to Championship Round

Pool A
Skip (Club)	W	L	PF	PA	EW	EL	BE	SE
Mike McEwen (Royals)	5	0	37	19	23	14	6	10
John Epping (Leaside)	4	1	39	25	22	17	3	5
Sam Mooibroek (Whitby)	3	2	36	28	21	18	2	6
Jason Camm (Navan)	2	3	31	40	18	26	1	2
Aaron Squires (St. Thomas)	1	4	33	46	20	24	1	7
Alex Champ (Westmount)	0	5	24	42	17	22	2	3

Pool B
Skip (Club)	W	L	PF	PA	EW	EL	BE	SE
Glenn Howard (Penetanguishene)	5	0	45	21	28	15	3	12
Mike Fournier (Leaside)	4	1	44	39	26	23	2	5
Pat Ferris (Grimsby)	2	3	31	30	18	20	2	2
John Willsey (Oakville)	2	3	30	34	19	21	2	6
Landan Rooney (Whitby)	1	4	29	40	21	23	0	4
Dayna Deruelle (Harriston)	1	4	20	39	15	25	2	2

== Round-robin results ==
All draws are listed in Eastern Time (UTC−05:00).

=== Draw 2 ===
Tuesday, January 24, 9:30 am

Sheet A	1	2	3	4	5	6	7	8	9	10	Final
Glenn Howard 🔨	1	0	0	5	0	2	1	X	X	X	9
Dayna Deruelle	0	0	1	0	1	0	0	X	X	X	2

Sheet B	1	2	3	4	5	6	7	8	9	10	Final
Pat Ferris 🔨	0	3	1	0	4	0	X	X	X	X	8
Landan Rooney	0	0	0	1	0	1	X	X	X	X	2

Sheet C	1	2	3	4	5	6	7	8	9	10	11	Final
John Epping 🔨	0	0	2	0	0	2	0	3	0	0	1	8
Aaron Squires	1	0	0	1	0	0	1	0	2	2	0	7

Sheet D	1	2	3	4	5	6	7	8	9	10	Final
John Willsey	0	0	1	0	2	0	2	0	3	0	8
Mike Fournier 🔨	0	2	0	1	0	2	0	4	0	1	10

=== Draw 3 ===
Tuesday, January 24, 2:30 pm

Sheet A	1	2	3	4	5	6	7	8	9	10	Final
Alex Champ	0	0	2	0	0	2	0	2	0	1	7
Sam Mooibroek 🔨	0	4	0	1	1	0	2	0	0	0	8

Sheet B	1	2	3	4	5	6	7	8	9	10	Final
Jason Camm 🔨	1	0	2	0	0	1	0	0	0	X	4
Mike McEwen	0	3	0	2	1	0	2	1	1	X	10

=== Draw 4 ===
Tuesday, January 24, 7:30 pm

Sheet D	1	2	3	4	5	6	7	8	9	10	11	Final
Glenn Howard	0	2	0	1	0	0	2	0	2	1	1	9
Landan Rooney 🔨	2	0	2	0	1	1	0	2	0	0	0	8

Sheet E	1	2	3	4	5	6	7	8	9	10	Final
Mike Fournier 🔨	2	0	0	2	0	1	1	0	1	1	8
Dayna Deruelle	0	2	0	0	2	0	0	2	0	0	6

=== Draw 5 ===
Wednesday, January 25, 9:30 am

Sheet A	1	2	3	4	5	6	7	8	9	10	Final
Pat Ferris 🔨	0	2	0	0	1	1	0	0	2	X	6
John Willsey	0	0	0	2	0	0	0	1	0	X	3

Sheet B	1	2	3	4	5	6	7	8	9	10	Final
Sam Mooibroek 🔨	2	0	3	1	0	2	0	2	X	X	10
Aaron Squires	0	0	0	0	2	0	2	0	X	X	4

Sheet C	1	2	3	4	5	6	7	8	9	10	Final
Jason Camm 🔨	3	1	0	2	0	1	0	0	X	X	7
Alex Champ	0	0	1	0	1	0	0	1	X	X	3

Sheet E	1	2	3	4	5	6	7	8	9	10	Final
John Epping	0	2	0	0	0	0	1	0	2	1	6
Mike McEwen 🔨	2	0	0	0	1	1	0	3	0	0	7

=== Draw 7 ===
Wednesday, January 25, 7:30 pm

Sheet A	1	2	3	4	5	6	7	8	9	10	Final
Mike McEwen	1	2	0	0	0	3	1	1	X	X	8
Aaron Squires 🔨	0	0	1	0	0	0	0	0	X	X	1

Sheet B	1	2	3	4	5	6	7	8	9	10	11	Final
Glenn Howard 🔨	1	0	2	0	0	1	0	0	2	1	2	9
Mike Fournier	0	2	0	1	1	0	2	1	0	0	0	7

Sheet C	1	2	3	4	5	6	7	8	9	10	Final
Pat Ferris 🔨	0	2	0	0	2	0	1	0	2	0	7
Dayna Deruelle	1	0	2	1	0	1	0	2	0	1	8

Sheet D	1	2	3	4	5	6	7	8	9	10	Final
John Epping 🔨	2	1	0	4	0	2	X	X	X	X	9
Alex Champ	0	0	1	0	1	0	X	X	X	X	2

Sheet E	1	2	3	4	5	6	7	8	9	10	Final
John Willsey	0	1	0	2	0	3	0	1	1	2	10
Landan Rooney 🔨	2	0	1	0	3	0	1	0	0	0	7

=== Draw 8 ===
Thursday, January 26, 9:30 am

Sheet D	1	2	3	4	5	6	7	8	9	10	Final
Jason Camm 🔨	2	0	0	0	1	0	0	1	0	X	4
Sam Mooibroek	0	2	1	1	0	2	1	0	2	X	9

=== Draw 9 ===
Thursday, January 26, 2:30 pm

Sheet C	1	2	3	4	5	6	7	8	9	10	Final
Glenn Howard 🔨	1	1	1	2	0	0	1	1	3	X	10
John Willsey	0	0	0	0	2	0	0	0	0	X	2

Sheet D	1	2	3	4	5	6	7	8	9	10	Final
Pat Ferris 🔨	1	0	2	0	3	0	1	0	1	0	8
Mike Fournier	0	3	0	2	0	1	0	2	0	1	9

Sheet E	1	2	3	4	5	6	7	8	9	10	Final
Landan Rooney	0	2	0	0	2	0	2	1	1	X	8
Dayna Deruelle 🔨	1	0	0	1	0	1	0	0	0	X	3

=== Draw 10 ===
Thursday, January 26, 7:30 pm

Sheet A	1	2	3	4	5	6	7	8	9	10	Final
John Epping 🔨	0	1	0	2	2	0	2	0	1	X	8
Sam Mooibroek	0	0	1	0	0	2	0	2	0	X	5

Sheet B	1	2	3	4	5	6	7	8	9	10	11	Final
Jason Camm	0	2	1	0	0	3	0	0	4	0	2	12
Aaron Squires 🔨	2	0	0	2	2	0	2	1	0	1	0	10

Sheet C	1	2	3	4	5	6	7	8	9	10	Final
Alex Champ	0	0	1	0	1	0	2	0	0	X	4
Mike McEwen 🔨	0	1	0	2	0	2	0	0	2	X	7

=== Draw 11 ===
Friday, January 27, 9:30 am

Sheet E	1	2	3	4	5	6	7	8	9	10	Final
Pat Ferris	0	0	0	0	1	0	0	1	0	X	2
Glenn Howard 🔨	0	0	1	1	0	2	1	0	3	X	8

=== Draw 12 ===
Friday, January 27, 2:30 pm

Sheet A	1	2	3	4	5	6	7	8	9	10	Final
Mike Fournier	0	1	0	2	0	4	1	0	0	2	10
Landan Rooney 🔨	2	0	1	0	2	0	0	2	1	0	8

Sheet B	1	2	3	4	5	6	7	8	9	10	Final
John Willsey 🔨	1	1	1	1	1	0	2	X	X	X	7
Dayna Deruelle	0	0	0	0	0	1	0	X	X	X	1

Sheet C	1	2	3	4	5	6	7	8	9	10	Final
John Epping 🔨	1	1	0	1	0	1	0	4	0	X	8
Jason Camm	0	0	0	0	2	0	1	0	1	X	4

Sheet D	1	2	3	4	5	6	7	8	9	10	Final
Sam Mooibroek	0	0	0	1	0	2	0	0	1	0	4
Mike McEwen 🔨	0	0	2	0	1	0	1	0	0	1	5

Sheet E	1	2	3	4	5	6	7	8	9	10	11	Final
Alex Champ	1	0	0	4	1	0	0	1	1	0	0	8
Aaron Squires 🔨	0	2	1	0	0	1	3	0	0	1	3	11

== Championship round ==
Records from Round Robin carry over to the Championship Round

Key
Teams to Playoffs

Skip	W	L
Glenn Howard	7	0
Mike McEwen	6	1
John Epping	5	2
Mike Fournier	4	3

== Championship round results ==
=== Draw 13 ===
Friday, January 27, 7:30 pm

Sheet C	1	2	3	4	5	6	7	8	9	10	Final
Glenn Howard	0	0	1	0	1	0	1	1	0	1	5
Mike McEwen 🔨	0	0	0	1	0	1	0	0	0	0	2

Sheet D	1	2	3	4	5	6	7	8	9	10	Final
Mike Fournier	0	0	1	0	0	1	0	0	X	X	2
John Epping 🔨	0	1	0	0	2	0	3	1	X	X	7

=== Draw 15 ===
Saturday, January 28, 2:30 pm

Team	1	2	3	4	5	6	7	8	9	10	Final
Mike McEwen	0	3	1	1	0	0	3	X	X	X	8
Mike Fournier 🔨	1	0	0	0	0	1	0	X	X	X	2

Team	1	2	3	4	5	6	7	8	9	10	Final
Glenn Howard 🔨	0	1	0	0	3	1	1	0	1	X	7
John Epping	0	0	1	1	0	0	0	1	0	X	3

== Playoffs ==
Semifinal			Final
			1	Glenn Howard	3
2	Mike McEwen	7	2	Mike McEwen	8
3	John Epping	4

=== Semifinal ===
Saturday, January 28, 7:30 pm

Sheet C	1	2	3	4	5	6	7	8	9	10	Final
Mike McEwen 🔨	0	2	0	0	0	2	0	1	0	2	7
John Epping	0	0	0	2	1	0	0	0	1	0	4

=== Final ===
Sunday, January 29, 3:00 pm

Sheet C	1	2	3	4	5	6	7	8	9	10	Final
Mike McEwen	2	1	1	0	3	1	0	X	X	X	8
Glenn Howard 🔨	0	0	0	1	0	0	2	X	X	X	3

2023 Ontario Tankard

Mike McEwen
1st Ontario Provincial Championship title

== Qualification ==
=== Open Qualifier ===
January 6–8, Welland Curling Club, Welland

A1 Side
Dave Collyer (Quinte)	7
Carter Bryant (Guelph)	6
Emerson Steffler (Unionville)	3
Mackenzie Calwell (Ottawa)	9
Ethan Chisamore-Johnston (Ottawa)	1
Jordan McNamara (Rideau)	9

Quarterfinals
Samuel Steep (KW Granite)	6
Dylan Niepage (Guelph)	7
Dave Collyer (Quinte)	5
Mike McEwen (Royals)	9
Mackenzie Calwell (Ottawa)	9
Fraser Reid (Westmount)	6
Landan Rooney (Whitby)	8
Jordan McNamara (Rideau)	3

Semifinals
Dylan Niepage (Guelph)	6
Mike McEwen (Royals)	8
Mackenzie Calwell (Ottawa)	3
Landan Rooney (Whitby)	8

To Tankard
Mike McEwen (Royals)	6
Landan Rooney (Whitby)	8

A2 Side
John McCutcheon (North Halton)	9
Jayden King (RCMP)	10
Colton Daly (North Halton)	5
Daniel Hocevar (Dixie)	10

Quarterfinals
Travis Fanset (St. Thomas)	6
Paul Moffatt (KW Granite)	7
Jayden King (RCMP)	2
Mark Kean (Ottawa)	7
Dayna Deruelle (Harriston)	7
Daniel Hocevar (Dixie)	5
Rob Ainsley (Royals)	8
Cory Heggestad (Stroud)	5

Semifinals
Paul Moffatt (KW Granite)	7
Mark Kean (Ottawa)	8
Dayna Deruelle (Harriston)	7
Rob Ainsley (Royals)	6

To Tankard
Mark Kean (Ottawa)	4
Dayna Deruelle (Harriston)	7

B1 Side
Ethan Chisamore-Johnston (Ottawa)	1
Fraser Reid (Westmount)	9
Emerson Steffler (Unionville)	6
Jordan McNamara (Rideau)	8
John McCutcheon (North Halton)	1
Dave Collyer (Quinte)	8

Round of 16
Fraser Reid (Westmount)	6
Jordan McNamara (Rideau)	7
Samuel Steep (KW Granite)	6
Dave Collyer (Quinte)	5

Quarterfinals
Rob Ainsley (Royals)	8
Jordan McNamara (Rideau)	6
Samuel Steep (KW Granite)	6
Paul Moffatt (KW Granite)	8

Semifinals
Rob Ainsley (Royals)	6
Paul Moffatt (KW Granite)	10

To Tankard
Mike McEwen (Royals)	8
Paul Moffatt (KW Granite)	2

B2 Side
Colton Daly (North Halton)	1
Jayden King (RCMP)	8
Carter Bryant (Guelph)	9
Daniel Hocevar (Dixie)	10

Round of 16
Jayden King (RCMP)	8
Travis Fanset (St. Thomas)	9
Cory Heggestad (Stroud)	5
Daniel Hocevar (Dixie)	7

Quarterfinals
Mackenzie Calwell (Ottawa)	1
Travis Fanset (St. Thomas)	9
Daniel Hocevar (Dixie)	8
Dylan Niepage (Guelph)	7

Semifinals
Travis Fanset (St. Thomas)	8
Daniel Hocevar (Dixie)	6

To Tankard
Mark Kean (Ottawa)	2
Travis Fanset (St. Thomas)	6
