= 2022 Ontario Tankard =

- Host city: Port Elgin, Ontario
- Arena: The Plex
- Dates: February 9–13
- Winner: Team Howard
- Curling club: Penetanguishene Curling Club, Penetanguishene
- Skip: Scott Howard
- Third: Adam Spencer
- Second: David Mathers
- Lead: Tim March
- Alternate: Glenn Howard
- Finalist: John Epping

The 2022 Ontario Tankard, (known as the Port Elgin Chrysler '22 Ontario Tankard Presented by Bruce Power for sponsorship reasons), the provincial men's curling championship for Southern Ontario, was held from February 9 to 13 at The Plex in Port Elgin, Ontario. The winning Howard team represented Ontario at the 2022 Tim Hortons Brier, Canada's national men's curling championship in Lethbridge, Alberta.

The event was expected to attract around 9,000 spectators, and to bring a $1,000,000 to the local economy. Bruce County contributed $5,000 cash and $5,000 in-kind for sponsorship, with revenues expected to contribute to improving the local Port Elgin Curling Club, which is playing host to the event (but is not the host venue).

Team Howard, skipped by Scott Howard, won in the final, defeating the defending champion John Epping rink. Team Howard's normal skip, Glenn Howard (Scott's father) missed the event due to a knee injury. Spare Adam Spencer filled in as third on the team, which also consisted of David Mathers and Tim March. Epping took control early in the final, going up 3–1 after 2 ends, but team Howard remained patient, blanking the next four ends, before Scott Howard made a double in the 7th to tie the game. Epping blanked the eighth, but narrowly missed a blank opportunity in 9th, giving up a steal of one. In the tenth, Howard made a double to lie two on his last. Epping attempted to respond with a double of his own, but missed, giving up another steal, losing the game 5–3. In total, there were about 500 fans on hand to watch the game, which was described as "electric" by Glenn Howard, in a game that was played amidst changing regulations due to the COVID-19 pandemic in Ontario.

== Qualification process ==
Originally, eight teams were to qualify, two from a cash spiel qualifier, three from an open qualifier, the top two southern Ontario teams in the CTRS standings (December 1, 2021), and one from the "Trillium Tour Series", the top team from a series of Ontario Curling Tour events (as of December 20, 2021).

On January 24, 2022, CurlON decided to expand the field to 12 teams, as it could not hold the open qualifier due to the COVID-19 pandemic in Ontario. It invited the next top 7 teams on the CTRS ranking who were in the qualifiers.

Teams

Qualification method	Berths	Qualifying team(s)
CTRS leader	2	John Epping; Glenn Howard
Trillium Tour Series	1	Pat Ferris
Cash Spiel	2	Scott Mitchell; Dylan Niepage
Qualifier Invite	7	Tanner Horgan; Mark Kean; Jason Camm; Sam Mooibroek; Sam Steep; Shane Latimer; Fraser Reid

== Teams ==
The team lineups are as follows:

Skip	Third	Second	Lead	Alternate	Club
Jason Camm	Matthew Hall	Cameron Goodkey	Jordie Lyon-Hatcher		Navan Curling Club, Navan, Ottawa
John Epping	Ryan Fry	Mathew Camm	Brent Laing		Leaside Curling Club, East York, Toronto
Pat Ferris	Ian Dickie	Connor Duhaime	Zachary Shurtleff		Grimsby Curling Club, Grimsby
Tanner Horgan	Jonathan Beuk	Wesley Forget	Scott Chadwick	Jacob Horgan	Cataraqui Golf and Country Club, Kingston
Scott Howard	Adam Spencer	David Mathers	Tim March	Glenn Howard (Note: Glenn Howard did not play due to an injured knee)	Penetanguishene Curling Club, Penetanguishene
Mark Kean	Kevin Flewwelling	Ed Cyr	Sean Harrison		Ingersoll & District Curling Club, Ingersoll
Shane Latimer	Punit Sthankiya	Brett Lyon-Hatcher	Brendan Acorn	Nicholas Lemieux	Whitby Curling Club, Whitby
Scott Mitchell	Landan Rooney	Nathan Steele	Colin Schnurr	Jacob Jones	Whitby Curling Club, Whitby
Sam Mooibroek	Matthew Garner	Brady Lumley	Spencer Dunlop	John Gabel	KW Granite Club, Waterloo
Dylan Niepage	Gavin Lydiate	Jayden King	Daniel Del Conte		Guelph Curling Club, Guelph
Fraser Reid	Shane Konings	Spencer Nuttall	Tyler Twining		Blue Water Curling Club, Owen Sound
Sam Steep	Adam Vincent	Oliver Campbell	Thomas Ryan	Douglas Thomson	KW Granite Club, Waterloo

== Knockout Draw Brackets ==
The draw is listed as follows:

=== A Event ===
First Knockout
Scott Mitchell	1
Fraser Reid	11
Shane Latimer	5
Mark Kean	6
Sam Steep	4
Jason Camm	8
Dylan Niepage	7
Sam Mooibroek	1

Quarterfinals
Scott Howard	7
Fraser Reid	6
Mark Kean	4
Pat Ferris	7
Tanner Horgan	4
Jason Camm	7
Dylan Niepage	2
John Epping	7

Semifinals
Scott Howard	7
Pat Ferris	3
Jason Camm	1
John Epping	8

Qualifier 1
Scott Howard	6
John Epping	8

=== B Event ===
Second Knockout
Mark Kean	5
Scott Mitchell	6
Tanner Horgan	5
Sam Mooibroek	8
Dylan Niepage	10
Sam Steep	7
Fraser Reid	2
Shane Latimer	8

Quarterfinals
Scott Mitchell	11
Jason Camm	5
Sam Mooibroek	13
Pat Ferris	7
Dylan Niepage	9
Shane Latimer	8

Semifinals
Scott Mitchell	6
Sam Mooibroek	3
Dylan Niepage	4
Scott Howard	7

Qualifier 2
Scott Mitchell	5
Scott Howard	7

=== C Event ===
Third Knockout		Semifinals		Qualifier 3
		Dylan Niepage	3
Tanner Horgan	5	Tanner Horgan	8
Mark Kean	3			Tanner Horgan	4
				Sam Mooibroek	5
		Shane Latimer	6
		Sam Mooibroek	9

Third Knockout		Semifinals		Qualifier 4
Sam Steep	5
Jason Camm	6	Jason Camm	9
Fraser Reid	4	Pat Ferris	8
Pat Ferris	10			Jason Camm	11
				Scott Mitchell	6

== Scores ==
=== Draw 1 ===
February 9, 7:30pm

Sheet A	1	2	3	4	5	6	7	8	9	10	Final
Scott Mitchell	0	1	0	0	0	X	X	X	X	X	1
Fraser Reid 🔨	5	0	2	0	4	X	X	X	X	X	11

Sheet B	1	2	3	4	5	6	7	8	9	10	Final
Shane Latimer 🔨	1	0	0	2	0	1	1	0	0	0	5
Mark Kean	0	1	1	0	2	0	0	1	0	1	6

Sheet C	1	2	3	4	5	6	7	8	9	10	Final
Sam Steep	1	1	0	0	0	1	0	1	0	X	4
Jason Camm	0	0	2	2	1	0	1	0	2	X	8

Sheet D	1	2	3	4	5	6	7	8	9	10	Final
Dylan Niepage 🔨	0	2	1	1	2	0	1	X	X	X	7
Sam Mooibroek	0	0	0	0	0	1	0	X	X	X	1

=== Draw 2 ===
February 10, 9:30am

Sheet A	1	2	3	4	5	6	7	8	9	10	Final
Tanner Horgan 🔨	0	0	1	0	0	2	0	1	0	X	4
Jason Camm	1	1	0	0	2	0	1	0	2	X	7

Sheet B	1	2	3	4	5	6	7	8	9	10	Final
Dylan Niepage	0	0	0	0	2	0	X	X	X	X	2
John Epping 🔨	3	0	2	1	0	1	X	X	X	X	7

Sheet C	1	2	3	4	5	6	7	8	9	10	Final
Scott Howard 🔨	2	0	1	0	2	0	1	0	0	1	7
Fraser Reid	0	2	0	1	0	1	0	1	1	0	6

Sheet D	1	2	3	4	5	6	7	8	9	10	Final
Mark Kean 🔨	1	0	0	2	0	0	1	0	0	0	4
Pat Ferris	0	2	0	0	1	0	0	1	1	2	7

=== Draw 3 ===
February 10, 2:30pm

Sheet A	1	2	3	4	5	6	7	8	9	10	Final
Mark Kean 🔨	0	2	0	1	0	0	1	0	1	0	5
Scott Mitchell	0	0	1	0	2	0	0	2	0	1	6

Sheet B	1	2	3	4	5	6	7	8	9	10	Final
Tanner Horgan 🔨	1	0	1	0	1	1	0	1	0	0	5
Sam Mooibroek	0	1	0	2	0	0	2	0	1	2	8

Sheet C	1	2	3	4	5	6	7	8	9	10	Final
Dylan Niepage 🔨	2	0	0	2	0	2	1	0	3	X	10
Sam Steep	0	0	3	0	2	0	0	2	0	X	7

Sheet D	1	2	3	4	5	6	7	8	9	10	Final
Fraser Reid	1	0	1	0	0	0	0	X	X	X	2
Shane Latimer 🔨	0	3	0	1	0	2	2	X	X	X	8

=== Draw 4 ===
February 10, 7:30pm

Sheet A	1	2	3	4	5	6	7	8	9	10	Final
Scott Howard 🔨	0	0	0	1	1	0	3	1	1	X	7
Pat Ferris	0	0	0	0	0	3	0	0	0	X	3

Sheet B	1	2	3	4	5	6	7	8	9	10	Final
Mark Kean 🔨	0	1	0	0	0	0	1	0	1	0	3
Tanner Horgan	0	0	1	1	0	1	0	1	0	1	5

Sheet C	1	2	3	4	5	6	7	8	9	10	Final
Jason Camm	0	1	0	0	0	X	X	X	X	X	1
John Epping 🔨	2	0	1	4	1	X	X	X	X	X	8

=== Draw 5 ===
February 11, 9:30am

Sheet A	1	2	3	4	5	6	7	8	9	10	Final
Dylan Niepage 🔨	0	2	0	0	1	2	0	4	0	0	9
Shane Latimer	1	0	1	0	0	0	2	0	2	2	8

Sheet B	1	2	3	4	5	6	7	8	9	10	Final
Scott Mitchell 🔨	2	0	0	2	0	0	2	1	4	X	11
Jason Camm	0	2	0	0	2	1	0	0	0	X	5

Sheet C	1	2	3	4	5	6	7	8	9	10	Final
Scott Howard 🔨	0	1	1	0	1	3	0	0	0	0	6
John Epping	0	0	0	4	0	0	1	1	1	1	8

Sheet D	1	2	3	4	5	6	7	8	9	10	Final
Sam Mooibroek 🔨	1	0	3	0	1	3	2	3	X	X	13
Pat Ferris	0	5	0	2	0	0	0	0	X	X	7

=== Draw 6 ===
February 11, 2:30pm

Sheet A	1	2	3	4	5	6	7	8	9	10	Final
Jason Camm 🔨	1	1	0	0	0	1	0	3	0	0	6
Sam Steep	0	0	0	1	0	0	1	0	2	1	5

Sheet B	1	2	3	4	5	6	7	8	9	10	Final
Pat Ferris 🔨	2	0	0	2	0	2	0	4	X	X	10
Fraser Reid	0	0	1	0	1	0	2	0	X	X	4

Sheet A	1	2	3	4	5	6	7	8	9	10	Final
Scott Mitchell	0	0	2	0	1	0	1	1	1	X	6
Sam Mooibroek 🔨	0	1	0	1	0	1	0	0	0	X	3

Sheet D	1	2	3	4	5	6	7	8	9	10	Final
Dylan Niepage	0	0	1	0	0	1	0	0	2	0	4
Scott Howard 🔨	2	0	0	0	1	0	2	1	0	1	7

=== Draw 7 ===
February 11, 7:30pm

Sheet A	1	2	3	4	5	6	7	8	9	10	Final
Scott Mitchell 🔨	2	0	0	2	0	0	1	0	0	X	5
Scott Howard	0	1	1	0	0	2	0	2	1	X	7

Sheet B	1	2	3	4	5	6	7	8	9	10	Final
Shane Latimer 🔨	0	1	0	3	0	0	1	1	0	X	6
Sam Mooibroek	3	0	1	0	0	2	0	0	3	X	9

Sheet C	1	2	3	4	5	6	7	8	9	10	Final
Dylan Niepage	0	1	0	1	0	1	0	0	X	X	3
Tanner Horgan 🔨	2	0	0	0	2	0	2	2	X	X	8

Sheet D	1	2	3	4	5	6	7	8	9	10	Final
Jason Camm	0	1	0	5	0	0	2	0	0	1	9
Pat Ferris 🔨	0	0	1	0	0	4	0	1	2	0	8

=== Draw 8 ===
February 12, 9:30am

Sheet B	1	2	3	4	5	6	7	8	9	10	Final
Jason Camm 🔨	0	2	0	2	0	0	2	0	2	3	11
Scott Mitchell	0	0	2	0	0	2	0	2	0	0	6

Sheet B	1	2	3	4	5	6	7	8	9	10	11	Final
Sam Mooibroek 🔨	0	1	0	0	2	0	1	0	0	0	1	5
Tanner Horgan	0	0	0	1	0	1	0	1	0	1	0	4

== Playoffs ==
Page playoff system
A	John Epping	7
B	Scott Howard	8
C1	Sam Mooibroek	6
C2	Jason Camm	9

Semifinal
A	John Epping	9
C2	Jason Camm	4

Final
B	Scott Howard	5
A	John Epping	3

=== A vs. B ===
February 12, 2:30pm

Sheet C	1	2	3	4	5	6	7	8	9	10	Final
John Epping 🔨	1	0	2	0	0	2	0	1	1	0	7
Scott Howard	0	3	0	0	2	0	1	0	0	2	8

=== C1 vs. C2 ===
February 12, 7:30pm

Sheet C	1	2	3	4	5	6	7	8	9	10	Final
Sam Mooibroek 🔨	0	1	1	0	1	0	2	0	1	0	6
Jason Camm	2	0	0	1	0	2	0	1	0	3	9

=== Semifinal ===
February 13, 9:30am

Sheet C	1	2	3	4	5	6	7	8	9	10	Final
John Epping 🔨	4	0	3	0	2	0	X	X	X	X	9
Jason Camm	0	2	0	1	0	1	X	X	X	X	4

=== Final ===
February 13, 2:30pm

Sheet C	1	2	3	4	5	6	7	8	9	10	Final
Scott Howard 🔨	1	0	0	0	0	0	2	0	1	1	5
John Epping	0	3	0	0	0	0	0	0	0	0	3

2022 Ontario Tankard

Scott Howard
4th Ontario Provincial Championship title

== Qualification ==
=== CurlON CashSpiel ===
December 17–19, CC of Collingwood, Collingwood

A Event	Qualifier 1
Wayne Tuck Jr. (Collingwood)	1
Scott Mitchell (Whitby)	7
Scott Mitchell (Whitby)	5
Mac Calwell (Stroud)	2
Paul Moffatt (KW Granite)	3
Mac Calwell (Stroud)	6
Scott Mitchell (Whitby)	7
Tanner Horgan (Cataraqui)	5
Tanner Horgan (Cataraqui)	9
Nicholas Lemieux (St. Catharines)	8	Nicholas Lemieux (St. Catharines)	0
Eric Greavette (Collingwood)	4	Tanner Horgan (Cataraqui)	9
Alex Champ (Westmount)	3
Alex Champ (Westmount)	6
Sam Steep (KW Granite)	2

A Event	Qualifier 2
Jason Camm (Navan)	10
Jordan McNamara (Navy)	3
Jason Camm (Navan)	8
Fraser Reid (Westmount)	5
Fraser Reid (Westmount)	6
Shane Latimer (Whitby)	5
Jason Camm (Navan)	5
Dylan Niepage (Guelph)	2
Mark Kean (Woodstock)	4
Dylan Niepage (Guelph)	5	Dylan Niepage (Guelph)	5
Scott Dow (Kincardine)	4	Dylan Niepage (Guelph)	4
Sam Mooibroek (KW Granite)	2
Sam Mooibroek (KW Granite)	5
Brandon Tippin (Brant)	2

B Event	Qualifier 3
Paul Moffatt (KW Granite)	7
Nicholas Lemieux (St. Catharines)	5
Paul Moffatt (KW Granite)	2
Wayne Tuck Jr. (Collingwood)	7
Wayne Tuck Jr. (Collingwood)	8
Sam Steep (KW Granite)	8	Sam Steep (KW Granite)	4
Eric Greavette (Collingwood)	0	Wayne Tuck Jr. (Collingwood)	5
Dylan Niepage (Guelph)	7

B Event	Qualifier 4
Mark Kean (Woodstock)	7
Shane Latimer (Whitby)	3
Mark Kean (Woodstock)	6
Brandon Tippin (Brant)	2
Jordan McNamara (Navy)	4
Brandon Tippin (Brant)	7	Brandon Tippin (Brant)	6
Scott Dow (Kincardine)	4	Mark Kean (Woodstock)	4
Tanner Horgan (Cataraqui)	8

B Event		Qualifier 5
Mac Calwell (Stroud)	6
Alex Champ (Westmount)	7	Alex Champ (Westmount)	6
Fraser Reid (Westmount)	6	Sam Mooibroek (KW Granite)	8
Sam Mooibroek (KW Granite)	8

C Event	Qualifier 6
Jordan McNamara (Navy)	5
Shane Latimer (Whitby)	7	Shane Latimer (Whitby)	4
Eric Greavette (Collingwood)	5	Jordan McNamara (Navy)	7
Fraser Reid (Westmount)	5
Jordan McNamara (Navy)	2
Mark Kean (Woodstock)	5

C Event		Qualifier 7
Paul Moffatt (KW Granite)	5
Brandon Tippin (Brant)	8	Brandon Tippin (Brant)	5
		Alex Champ (Westmount)	8

C Event	Qualifier 8
Sam Steep (KW Granite)	8
Nicholas Lemieux (St. Catharines)	1	Scott Dow (Kincardine)	7
Scott Dow (Kincardine)	4	Mac Calwell (Stroud)	5
Sam Steep (KW Granite)	4
Mac Calwell (Stroud)	3
Wayne Tuck Jr. (Collingwood)	5

Playoff 1		To Provincials
Scott Mitchell (Whitby)	7
Wayne Tuck Jr. (Collingwood)	1	Scott Mitchell (Whitby)	6
Tanner Horgan (Cataraqui)	8	Tanner Horgan (Cataraqui)	4
Sam Mooibroek (KW Granite)	3

Playoff 2		To Provincials
Jason Camm (Navan)	6
Mark Kean (Woodstock)	4	Jason Camm (Navan)	3
Dylan Niepage (Guelph)	5	Dylan Niepage (Guelph)	6
Alex Champ (Westmount)	1
