= Gavin Lydiate =

Canadian curler (born 2003)

- Curler
- Born: February 5, 2003 (age 23); Hawkesbury, Ontario

Team
- Curling club: Guelph CC, Guelph, ON
- Skip: Sam Mooibroek
- Third: Owen Purcell
- Second: Scott Mitchell
- Lead: Gavin Lydiate

Curling career
- Member Association: Ontario (2016–2025; 2026–present); Nova Scotia (2025–2026)
- Brier: 1 (2025)
- Top CTRS ranking: 19th (2023–24)

Gavin Lydiate (born February 5, 2003, in Hawkesbury) is a Canadian curler from Guelph, Ontario. He currently plays lead on Team Sam Mooibroek.

== Career ==
=== Juniors ===
Lydiate had a breakthrough 2021–22 season as a member of the Dylan Niepage rink that also included Jayden King and Daniel Del Conte. In August, the team went undefeated to win the Oakville Under 25 Kick-off, their first victory on the men's tour. They also advanced through the first cashspiel qualifier of the 2022 Ontario Tankard to qualify for their first provincial men's championship. There, they reached the B semifinals before dropping back-to-back games to Scott Howard and Tanner Horgan, eliminating them from contention. At the Ontario U20 Curling Championships, the team dropped the first final to Landan Rooney, however, defeated Christopher Inglis in the second final to earn the right to compete at the 2022 Canadian Junior Curling Championships as Ontario 2. At the championship, the team finished 4–4 in the round robin, not enough to advance to the playoffs.

The following season, King and Del Conte left the team and were replaced by Kibo Mulima and Riley Fung-Ernst. This team reached the playoffs at two men's events, however, lost in the quarterfinal round at both. At the junior provincial, they failed to advance to the 2023 Canadian Junior Curling Championships after losing the second final to Landan Rooney. Lydiate, however, still participated in the championship as alternate for Jayden King's winning team. There, the team missed the playoffs with a 3–5 record.

=== Men's ===
Out of juniors, Lydiate and Niepage reunited with King and Del Conte, however, with King taking over as skip for the 2023–24 season. On the men's tour, the team saw immediate success, winning the Capital Curling Fall Open and reaching the final of the Stroud Sleeman Cash Spiel. They also made it to the semifinals of the Summer Series and the quarterfinals of the 2023 KW Fall Classic and 2023 Stu Sells Tankard. With their points accumulated on the Ontario tour, the team was able to directly qualify for the 2024 Ontario Tankard. There, Team King lost in the A and B brackets to Sam Mooibroek but bounced back to qualify for the playoffs through the C event. In the playoffs, Team King then scored upset victories over Pat Ferris and John Epping to qualify for the provincial final. Facing Scott Howard, the team lost 8–7 in an extra end, finishing second. To end the season, Team King represented the University of Guelph at the 2024 U Sports/Curling Canada University Curling Championships after finishing third at the OUA championship. There, they had a disappointing 3–4 sixth-place finish. After the season, Lydiate left the team and took a break from competitive play.

Despite not curling competitively during the 2024–25 season, Lydiate made his first appearance at The Brier as alternate for Sam Mooibroek. At the 2025 Montana's Brier, the team just missed the playoffs after losing their final round robin game to Nova Scotia's Owen Purcell. The following season, Lydiate joined the Purcell rink out of Nova Scotia as their new second, replacing Scott Saccary. On tour, the team saw limited success, qualifying for the playoffs in four of their nine events and only advancing to the semifinals twice. Despite this, the team still entered the 2026 Ocean Contractors Men's Curling Championship as the top seeds and advanced directly to the final with a 6–1 round robin record. There, they were defeated 9–7 by Kendal Thompson, finishing second. After the event, the team disbanded.

For the 2026–27 season, Lydiate moved back to Ontario to join the newly formed Sam Mooibroek rink that also included Owen Purcell and Scott Mitchell.

== Personal life ==
Lydiate is the founder of Granite Strength Academy, a curling based personal training organization. He previously worked as a personal trainer at GoodLife Fitness. He studied human kinetics while attending the University of Guelph.

== Teams ==
Season	Skip	Third	Second	Lead
2016–17	Nick Guindon	David Boswell	Gavin Lydiate	Nate James
2017–18	Gavin Lydiate	David Boswell	Nick Guindon	Nate James
2018–19	Christopher Inglis	Gavin Lydiate	Lucas Bourguignon	Brayden McGuire
2019–20	Landan Rooney	Gavin Lydiate	Christopher Oka	Riley Fung-Ernst
2021–22	Dylan Niepage	Gavin Lydiate	Jayden King	Daniel Del Conte
2022–23	Dylan Niepage	Kibo Mulima	Gavin Lydiate	Riley Fung-Ernst
2023–24	Jayden King	Dylan Niepage	Gavin Lydiate	Daniel Del Conte
2025–26	Owen Purcell	Luke Saunders	Gavin Lydiate	Ryan Abraham
2026–27	Sam Mooibroek	Owen Purcell	Scott Mitchell	Gavin Lydiate
