= 2023 Canadian Junior Curling Championships =

2023 New Holland Canadian Junior Curling Championships
- Host city: Rouyn-Noranda, Quebec
- Arena: Aréna Jacques Laperrière & Club de Curling Noranda
- Dates: March 26 – April 2
- Men's winner: Alberta 2
- Curling club: Saville Community SC, Edmonton
- Skip: Johnson Tao
- Third: Jaedon Neuert
- Second: Benjamin Morin
- Lead: Adam Naugler
- Coach: Skip Wilson
- Finalist: Northern Ontario (Burgess)
- Women's winner: Alberta 1
- Curling club: Airdrie CC, Airdrie & Sherwood Park CC, Sherwood Park
- Skip: Myla Plett
- Third: Alyssa Nedohin
- Second: Chloe Fediuk
- Lead: Allie Iskiw
- Coach: Blair Lenton
- Finalist: Newfoundland and Labrador (Mitchell)

The 2023 New Holland Canadian Junior Curling Championships were held from March 26 to April 2 at the Aréna Jacques Laperrière and the Club de Curling Noranda in Rouyn-Noranda, Quebec. The winners will represent Canada at the 2023 World Junior-B Curling Championships where they will need to finish in the top three to qualify for the 2024 World Junior Curling Championships in Lohja, Finland.

This was the third time Rouyn-Noranda played host the Canadian Junior Curling Championships. The city previously held the men's event in 1960 which was won by Alberta's Tommy Kroeger and the women's event in 1986, won by British Columbia's Jodie Sutton. Like the 2022 championship, the 2023 event featured eighteen teams on both the men's and women's sides, each split into two pools of nine. The top three teams from each pool at the end of the round robin advanced to the playoff round. Based on results from the 2020 and 2022 events, certain provinces earned two berths to the championship. Alberta, British Columbia, Manitoba, Newfoundland and Labrador, Ontario and Saskatchewan each earned an extra berth on the men's side, while Alberta, Manitoba, New Brunswick and Nova Scotia got two berths on the women's side The host province, Quebec, also earned two teams.

== Medallists ==
Junior	Gold	Silver	Bronze
Men	Alberta 2 Johnson Tao; Jaedon Neuert; Benjamin Morin; Adam Naugler	Northern Ontario; Dallas Burgess; Jackson Dubinsky; Matt Duizer; Owen Riches; Brendan Rajala	Manitoba 1 Jordon McDonald; Reece Hamm; Elias Huminicki; Cameron Olafson; Tanner Graham
Women	Alberta 1 Myla Plett; Alyssa Nedohin; Chloe Fediuk; Allie Iskiw	Newfoundland and Labrador; Mackenzie Mitchell; Sarah McNeil Lamswood; Kate Paterson; Emily Neary	Manitoba 1 Zoey Terrick; Jaycee Terrick; Jensen Letham; Tessa Terrick

== Men ==
=== Teams ===
The teams are listed as follows:

Province / Territory	Skip	Third	Second	Lead	Alternate	Club(s)
Alberta 1	James Ballance	Lowell Whittmire	Ethan Drysdale	Neil Donovan		Okotoks / Lethbridge
Alberta 2	Johnson Tao	Jaedon Neuert	Benjamin Morin	Adam Naugler		Saville Community SC, Edmonton
British Columbia 1	Adam Fenton	Alex Duncan-Wu	Chris Parkinson	Matthew Fenton		Royal City CC, New Westminster
British Columbia 2	Thomas Reed	Neil Imada	Preston Ballard	Miles Reed		Golden Ears WC, Maple Ridge
Manitoba 1	Jordon McDonald	Reece Hamm	Elias Huminicki	Cameron Olafson	Tanner Graham	Deer Lodge CC, Winnipeg
Manitoba 2	Jace Freeman	Thomas McGillivray	Ryan Ostrowsky	Aaron MacDonnell	Alexandre Fontaine	Virden CC, Virden
New Brunswick	Timothy Marin	Rajan Dalrymple	Emmett Knee	Cameron Sallaj		Thistle-St. Andrews CC, Saint John
Newfoundland and Labrador 1	Simon Perry	Nicholas Codner	William Butler	Evan Scott		St. John's CC, St. John's
Newfoundland and Labrador 2	Nathan Young	Sam Follett	Nathan Locke	Aaron Feltham		St. John's CC, St. John's
Northern Ontario	Dallas Burgess	Jackson Dubinsky	Matt Duizer	Owen Riches	Brendan Rajala	Port Arthur CC, Thunder Bay
Nova Scotia	Calan MacIsaac	Nathan Gray	Owain Fisher	Christopher McCurdy		Truro CC, Truro
Ontario 1	Jayden King	Jack Ragan	Owen Henry	Jacob Clarke	Gavin Lydiate	RCMP CC, Ottawa
Ontario 2	Landan Rooney	Daniel Hocevar	Joel Matthews	Christopher Oka		Dixie CC, Mississauga
Prince Edward Island	Chase MacMillan (Fourth)	Mitchell Schut (Skip)	Cruz Pineau	Liam Kelly		Cornwall CC, Cornwall
Quebec 1	Adam Bédard	Mathis Arsenault	Zakary Rose	Nathan Gendron	Gabriel Audette	CC Noranda, Royun-Noranda
Quebec 2	Léandre Girard	James Trahan	Jacob Labrecque	Xavier Guévin	Maxim Charbonneau	Victoria / Trois-Rivières / Kénogami
Saskatchewan 1	Logan Ede	Brayden Grindheim	Michael Hom	Austin Krupski		Martensville CC, Martensville
Saskatchewan 2	Matthew Drewitz	Adam Drewitz	Caden Snow	Jared Tessier		Sutherland CC, Saskatoon

=== Round robin standings ===
Final Round Robin Standings

Key
Teams to Playoffs

Pool A	Skip	W	L	W–L	DSC
Manitoba 1	Jordon McDonald	8	0	–	465.6
Manitoba 2	Jace Freeman	7	1	–	553.5
Northern Ontario	Dallas Burgess	5	3	1–0	956.9
Newfoundland and Labrador 2	Nathan Young	5	3	0–1	701.8
Alberta 1	James Ballance	4	4	–	1511.4
Ontario 1	Jayden King	3	5	–	570.8
Prince Edward Island	Mitchell Schut	2	6	1–0	1177.3
Quebec 2	Léandre Girard	2	6	0–1	692.7
British Columbia 2	Thomas Reed	0	8	–	678.7

Pool B	Skip	W	L	W–L	DSC
Alberta 2	Johnson Tao	7	1	–	367.9
Nova Scotia	Calan MacIsaac	6	2	–	442.5
Ontario 2	Landan Rooney	5	3	1–0	485.8
British Columbia 1	Adam Fenton	5	3	0–1	664.1
Saskatchewan 1	Logan Ede	3	5	1–1	527.7
New Brunswick	Timothy Marin	3	5	1–1	926.6
Saskatchewan 2	Matthew Drewitz	3	5	1–1	963.2
Newfoundland and Labrador 1	Simon Perry	2	6	1–0	764.7
Quebec 1	Adam Bédard	2	6	0–1	1411.0

=== Round robin results ===
All draw times are listed in Eastern Time (UTC−04:00).

==== Draw 1 ====
Sunday, March 26, 4:00 pm

Sheet A	1	2	3	4	5	6	7	8	9	10	Final
Prince Edward Island (Schut)	0	0	2	0	0	0	2	0	X	X	4
Alberta 1 (Ballance) 🔨	0	1	0	4	1	1	0	3	X	X	10

Sheet B	1	2	3	4	5	6	7	8	9	10	Final
Manitoba 1 (McDonald) 🔨	0	2	0	2	0	0	4	1	0	X	9
British Columbia 2 (Reed)	0	0	1	0	0	1	0	0	1	X	3

Sheet C	1	2	3	4	5	6	7	8	9	10	Final
Newfoundland and Labrador 2 (Young) 🔨	0	0	1	0	1	0	2	2	1	X	7
Ontario 1 (King)	0	0	0	0	0	2	0	0	0	X	2

Sheet D	1	2	3	4	5	6	7	8	9	10	Final
Northern Ontario (Burgess)	0	0	1	0	1	0	3	0	2	0	7
Manitoba 2 (Freeman) 🔨	2	0	0	1	0	3	0	1	0	2	9

Sheet E	1	2	3	4	5	6	7	8	9	10	Final
Nova Scotia (MacIsaac) 🔨	1	0	1	1	0	6	0	3	X	X	12
Saskatchewan 1 (Ede)	0	2	0	0	1	0	3	0	X	X	6

Sheet F	1	2	3	4	5	6	7	8	9	10	11	Final
Newfoundland and Labrador 1 (Perry)	1	0	0	1	0	0	1	1	1	1	2	8
New Brunswick (Marin) 🔨	0	2	1	0	2	1	0	0	0	0	0	6

Sheet G	1	2	3	4	5	6	7	8	9	10	Final
Saskatchewan 2 (Drewitz)	0	1	1	0	0	1	0	1	1	0	5
British Columbia 1 (Fenton) 🔨	0	0	0	2	1	0	2	0	0	1	6

Sheet H	1	2	3	4	5	6	7	8	9	10	11	Final
Alberta 2 (Tao)	0	1	0	1	0	0	0	2	0	0	1	5
Ontario 2 (Rooney) 🔨	0	0	1	0	0	2	0	0	0	1	0	4

==== Draw 3 ====
Monday, March 27, 9:00 am

Sheet A	1	2	3	4	5	6	7	8	9	10	Final
Manitoba 1 (McDonald) 🔨	0	3	0	1	0	4	0	4	0	X	12
Northern Ontario (Burgess)	0	0	2	0	2	0	3	0	2	X	9

Sheet B	1	2	3	4	5	6	7	8	9	10	Final
Quebec 2 (Girard) 🔨	0	0	0	0	0	0	0	0	X	X	0
Newfoundland and Labrador 2 (Young)	0	0	1	1	3	2	2	1	X	X	10

Sheet C	1	2	3	4	5	6	7	8	9	10	Final
Manitoba 2 (Freeman) 🔨	0	1	0	1	1	0	0	1	0	3	7
Alberta 1 (Ballance)	1	0	1	0	0	1	0	0	0	0	3

Sheet D	1	2	3	4	5	6	7	8	9	10	Final
British Columbia 2 (Reed) 🔨	1	0	0	2	0	0	0	1	1	0	5
Ontario 1 (King)	0	1	2	0	1	0	1	0	0	2	7

Sheet E	1	2	3	4	5	6	7	8	9	10	Final
Newfoundland and Labrador 1 (Perry) 🔨	2	0	0	0	0	1	0	0	X	X	3
Alberta 2 (Tao)	0	2	2	2	1	0	3	0	X	X	10

Sheet F	1	2	3	4	5	6	7	8	9	10	Final
Quebec 1 (Bédard) 🔨	0	0	2	1	0	2	0	2	0	1	8
Saskatchewan 2 (Drewitz)	2	1	0	0	2	0	1	0	1	0	7

Sheet G	1	2	3	4	5	6	7	8	9	10	11	Final
Ontario 2 (Rooney)	0	1	0	0	1	0	3	0	1	0	1	7
Saskatchewan 1 (Ede) 🔨	0	0	1	1	0	2	0	1	0	1	0	6

Sheet H	1	2	3	4	5	6	7	8	9	10	Final
New Brunswick (Marin)	0	0	0	2	0	1	0	0	X	X	3
British Columbia 1 (Fenton) 🔨	0	0	2	0	3	0	4	2	X	X	11

==== Draw 5 ====
Monday, March 27, 7:00 pm

Sheet A	1	2	3	4	5	6	7	8	9	10	Final
New Brunswick (Marin)	0	1	0	1	1	0	2	0	1	0	6
Ontario 2 (Rooney) 🔨	2	0	3	0	0	1	0	2	0	3	11

Sheet B	1	2	3	4	5	6	7	8	9	10	Final
Alberta 2 (Tao)	0	0	1	0	0	0	2	0	1	1	5
Nova Scotia (MacIsaac) 🔨	0	3	0	1	0	1	0	1	0	0	6

Sheet C	1	2	3	4	5	6	7	8	9	10	Final
Quebec 1 (Bédard)	0	0	0	0	0	1	0	0	X	X	1
Newfoundland and Labrador 1 (Perry) 🔨	0	0	0	3	2	0	3	2	X	X	10

Sheet D	1	2	3	4	5	6	7	8	9	10	Final
Saskatchewan 1 (Ede)	0	1	0	0	0	1	0	0	0	X	2
Saskatchewan 2 (Drewitz) 🔨	1	0	0	1	0	0	2	1	1	X	6

Sheet E	1	2	3	4	5	6	7	8	9	10	Final
British Columbia 2 (Reed)	0	1	0	0	1	0	0	0	X	X	2
Manitoba 2 (Freeman) 🔨	2	0	2	0	0	0	3	4	X	X	11

Sheet F	1	2	3	4	5	6	7	8	9	10	Final
Northern Ontario (Burgess)	0	2	0	4	0	0	2	0	0	2	10
Prince Edward Island (Schut) 🔨	1	0	2	0	1	1	0	3	1	0	9

Sheet G	1	2	3	4	5	6	7	8	9	10	Final
Quebec 2 (Girard)	0	1	0	0	1	0	1	0	3	X	6
Manitoba 1 (McDonald) 🔨	2	0	2	1	0	1	0	2	0	X	8

Sheet H	1	2	3	4	5	6	7	8	9	10	Final
Alberta 1 (Ballance)	0	0	0	0	2	0	1	1	0	X	4
Newfoundland and Labrador 2 (Young) 🔨	0	2	1	2	0	2	0	0	3	X	10

==== Draw 7 ====
Tuesday, March 28, 2:00 pm

Sheet A	1	2	3	4	5	6	7	8	9	10	Final
Saskatchewan 1 (Ede) 🔨	2	0	0	0	2	0	1	1	1	0	7
Quebec 1 (Bédard)	0	3	1	1	0	2	0	0	0	1	8

Sheet B	1	2	3	4	5	6	7	8	9	10	Final
Ontario 2 (Rooney) 🔨	2	0	1	0	2	1	1	0	1	X	8
British Columbia 1 (Fenton)	0	1	0	2	0	0	0	1	0	X	4

Sheet C	1	2	3	4	5	6	7	8	9	10	Final
Alberta 2 (Tao) 🔨	1	0	1	1	0	0	2	0	0	1	6
New Brunswick (Marin)	0	2	0	0	0	2	0	1	0	0	5

Sheet D	1	2	3	4	5	6	7	8	9	10	Final
Newfoundland and Labrador 1 (Perry)	0	0	0	1	0	0	1	0	X	X	2
Nova Scotia (MacIsaac) 🔨	2	1	1	0	1	3	0	2	X	X	10

Sheet E	1	2	3	4	5	6	7	8	9	10	Final
Alberta 1 (Ballance)	2	0	0	0	3	0	4	0	0	0	9
Quebec 2 (Girard) 🔨	0	2	1	1	0	3	0	2	1	3	13

Sheet F	1	2	3	4	5	6	7	8	9	10	Final
Manitoba 2 (Freeman) 🔨	1	0	0	0	1	0	0	2	2	1	7
Ontario 1 (King)	0	0	1	0	0	1	1	0	0	0	3

Sheet G	1	2	3	4	5	6	7	8	9	10	Final
Northern Ontario (Burgess)	0	0	1	1	0	0	2	2	4	X	10
British Columbia 2 (Reed) 🔨	1	0	0	0	1	1	0	0	0	X	3

Sheet H	1	2	3	4	5	6	7	8	9	10	Final
Manitoba 1 (McDonald) 🔨	2	1	1	0	2	0	0	3	X	X	9
Prince Edward Island (Schut)	0	0	0	1	0	1	0	0	X	X	2

==== Draw 9 ====
Wednesday, March 29, 9:00 am

Sheet A	1	2	3	4	5	6	7	8	9	10	Final
Ontario 1 (King)	0	0	2	0	0	1	0	0	1	X	4
Manitoba 1 (McDonald) 🔨	0	1	0	3	1	0	0	2	0	X	7

Sheet B	1	2	3	4	5	6	7	8	9	10	Final
British Columbia 2 (Reed)	0	0	2	0	2	0	0	0	X	X	4
Alberta 1 (Ballance) 🔨	0	4	0	2	0	0	3	2	X	X	11

Sheet C	1	2	3	4	5	6	7	8	9	10	Final
Prince Edward Island (Schut)	0	0	1	0	0	1	0	0	0	X	2
Newfoundland and Labrador 2 (Young) 🔨	0	1	0	1	0	0	0	2	2	X	6

Sheet D	1	2	3	4	5	6	7	8	9	10	Final
Quebec 2 (Girard)	0	0	1	1	1	0	2	0	1	0	6
Northern Ontario (Burgess) 🔨	2	1	0	0	0	3	0	1	0	1	8

Sheet E	1	2	3	4	5	6	7	8	9	10	Final
British Columbia 1 (Fenton)	0	0	0	4	0	2	1	0	1	X	8
Newfoundland and Labrador 1 (Perry) 🔨	1	1	1	0	2	0	0	1	0	X	6

Sheet F	1	2	3	4	5	6	7	8	9	10	Final
New Brunswick (Marin)	0	1	0	0	0	0	2	0	X	X	3
Saskatchewan 1 (Ede) 🔨	2	0	3	0	3	1	0	1	X	X	10

Sheet G	1	2	3	4	5	6	7	8	9	10	Final
Nova Scotia (MacIsaac) 🔨	2	1	0	0	0	2	0	1	0	X	6
Saskatchewan 2 (Drewitz)	0	0	0	0	1	0	0	0	1	X	2

Sheet H	1	2	3	4	5	6	7	8	9	10	Final
Quebec 1 (Bédard)	0	0	0	2	0	0	0	0	X	X	2
Alberta 2 (Tao) 🔨	2	0	1	0	0	1	2	3	X	X	9

==== Draw 11 ====
Wednesday, March 29, 7:00 pm

Sheet A	1	2	3	4	5	6	7	8	9	10	Final
Newfoundland and Labrador 2 (Young)	0	0	3	0	0	3	2	0	1	X	9
British Columbia 2 (Reed) 🔨	0	2	0	0	0	0	0	2	0	X	4

Sheet B	1	2	3	4	5	6	7	8	9	10	Final
Prince Edward Island (Schut) 🔨	2	0	1	0	1	0	1	0	0	1	6
Quebec 2 (Girard)	0	1	0	1	0	2	0	0	0	0	4

Sheet C	1	2	3	4	5	6	7	8	9	10	Final
Manitoba 1 (McDonald)	0	0	1	2	0	1	0	1	3	X	8
Manitoba 2 (Freeman) 🔨	0	2	0	0	1	0	1	0	0	X	4

Sheet D	1	2	3	4	5	6	7	8	9	10	Final
Ontario 1 (King)	0	0	0	0	2	0	1	0	1	0	4
Alberta 1 (Ballance) 🔨	0	0	2	1	0	0	0	2	0	2	7

Sheet E	1	2	3	4	5	6	7	8	9	10	Final
Saskatchewan 2 (Drewitz) 🔨	0	0	0	1	1	1	0	0	1	0	4
New Brunswick (Marin)	0	0	2	0	0	0	1	1	0	1	5

Sheet F	1	2	3	4	5	6	7	8	9	10	Final
Nova Scotia (MacIsaac) 🔨	0	2	1	3	2	0	0	1	X	X	9
Quebec 1 (Bédard)	0	0	0	0	0	1	1	0	X	X	2

Sheet G	1	2	3	4	5	6	7	8	9	10	Final
Newfoundland and Labrador 1 (Perry) 🔨	0	1	0	0	1	0	3	1	0	X	6
Ontario 2 (Rooney)	0	0	2	5	0	2	0	0	2	X	11

Sheet H	1	2	3	4	5	6	7	8	9	10	Final
British Columbia 1 (Fenton)	1	0	0	1	0	2	1	1	0	0	6
Saskatchewan 1 (Ede) 🔨	0	1	2	0	3	0	0	0	2	1	9

==== Draw 13 ====
Thursday, March 30, 2:00 pm

Sheet A	1	2	3	4	5	6	7	8	9	10	Final
Ontario 2 (Rooney) 🔨	0	0	1	0	1	0	2	1	0	X	5
Nova Scotia (MacIsaac)	0	0	0	2	0	4	0	0	2	X	8

Sheet B	1	2	3	4	5	6	7	8	9	10	Final
British Columbia 1 (Fenton)	0	3	0	0	0	0	1	2	0	0	6
Alberta 2 (Tao) 🔨	2	0	1	1	2	1	0	0	0	0	7

Sheet C	1	2	3	4	5	6	7	8	9	10	Final
New Brunswick (Marin) 🔨	0	3	0	4	2	0	2	0	X	X	11
Quebec 1 (Bédard)	1	0	1	0	0	2	0	1	X	X	5

Sheet D	1	2	3	4	5	6	7	8	9	10	11	Final
Saskatchewan 2 (Drewitz)	0	4	0	2	0	0	0	1	0	0	1	8
Newfoundland and Labrador 1 (Perry) 🔨	2	0	0	0	2	1	0	0	1	1	0	7

Sheet E	1	2	3	4	5	6	7	8	9	10	Final
Manitoba 2 (Freeman) 🔨	2	1	0	2	0	0	2	2	X	X	9
Prince Edward Island (Schut)	0	0	1	0	1	0	0	0	X	X	2

Sheet F	1	2	3	4	5	6	7	8	9	10	Final
Ontario 1 (King)	0	0	0	1	0	0	2	0	X	X	3
Northern Ontario (Burgess) 🔨	0	1	1	0	1	2	0	3	X	X	8

Sheet G	1	2	3	4	5	6	7	8	9	10	Final
British Columbia 2 (Reed)	0	0	1	0	0	0	2	0	X	X	3
Quebec 2 (Girard) 🔨	0	0	0	2	5	1	0	1	X	X	9

Sheet H	1	2	3	4	5	6	7	8	9	10	Final
Newfoundland and Labrador 2 (Young)	0	0	1	0	1	0	0	1	X	X	3
Manitoba 1 (McDonald) 🔨	2	2	0	0	0	2	3	0	X	X	9

==== Draw 15 ====
Friday, March 31, 9:00 am

Sheet A	1	2	3	4	5	6	7	8	9	10	Final
Quebec 2 (Girard) 🔨	2	0	1	0	0	2	0	0	X	X	5
Ontario 1 (King)	0	3	0	2	0	0	4	1	X	X	10

Sheet B	1	2	3	4	5	6	7	8	9	10	Final
Newfoundland and Labrador 2 (Young) 🔨	1	0	0	2	0	2	0	1	0	0	6
Manitoba 2 (Freeman)	0	1	0	0	2	0	2	0	2	1	8

Sheet C	1	2	3	4	5	6	7	8	9	10	Final
Alberta 1 (Ballance) 🔨	0	3	0	1	0	3	0	0	1	X	8
Northern Ontario (Burgess)	0	0	1	0	1	0	0	2	0	X	4

Sheet D	1	2	3	4	5	6	7	8	9	10	11	Final
Prince Edward Island (Schut) 🔨	0	0	0	0	2	1	0	0	0	2	3	8
British Columbia 2 (Reed)	0	0	1	1	0	0	0	2	1	0	0	5

Sheet E	1	2	3	4	5	6	7	8	9	10	Final
Quebec 1 (Bédard)	0	0	0	1	0	1	0	0	X	X	2
British Columbia 1 (Fenton) 🔨	2	2	2	0	1	0	3	1	X	X	11

Sheet F	1	2	3	4	5	6	7	8	9	10	Final
Saskatchewan 2 (Drewitz)	1	0	1	0	0	0	4	0	2	1	9
Ontario 2 (Rooney) 🔨	0	2	0	1	1	0	0	2	0	0	6

Sheet G	1	2	3	4	5	6	7	8	9	10	Final
Saskatchewan 1 (Ede)	0	0	0	1	0	2	0	0	X	X	3
Alberta 2 (Tao) 🔨	2	1	1	0	2	0	1	1	X	X	8

Sheet H	1	2	3	4	5	6	7	8	9	10	Final
Nova Scotia (MacIsaac) 🔨	1	0	0	0	1	0	1	0	2	0	5
New Brunswick (Marin)	0	0	0	0	0	1	0	1	0	4	6

==== Draw 17 ====
Friday, March 31, 7:00 pm

Sheet A	1	2	3	4	5	6	7	8	9	10	Final
Alberta 2 (Tao) 🔨	3	0	1	0	1	0	2	0	0	1	8
Saskatchewan 2 (Drewitz)	0	2	0	1	0	2	0	2	0	0	7

Sheet B	1	2	3	4	5	6	7	8	9	10	Final
Saskatchewan 1 (Ede) 🔨	1	1	0	1	0	2	0	1	0	X	6
Newfoundland and Labrador 1 (Perry)	0	0	1	0	1	0	1	0	1	X	4

Sheet C	1	2	3	4	5	6	7	8	9	10	Final
British Columbia 1 (Fenton) 🔨	0	3	0	2	0	1	0	0	0	2	8
Nova Scotia (MacIsaac)	0	0	2	0	1	0	3	1	0	0	7

Sheet D	1	2	3	4	5	6	7	8	9	10	Final
Ontario 2 (Rooney) 🔨	1	0	0	0	1	0	0	2	2	X	6
Quebec 1 (Bédard)	0	0	0	0	0	0	1	0	0	X	1

Sheet E	1	2	3	4	5	6	7	8	9	10	11	Final
Northern Ontario (Burgess) 🔨	1	0	1	0	2	0	0	2	0	2	2	10
Newfoundland and Labrador 2 (Young)	0	2	0	1	0	0	4	0	1	0	0	8

Sheet F	1	2	3	4	5	6	7	8	9	10	Final
Alberta 1 (Ballance)	1	0	1	0	0	0	2	0	X	X	4
Manitoba 1 (McDonald) 🔨	0	1	0	5	0	2	0	2	X	X	10

Sheet G	1	2	3	4	5	6	7	8	9	10	Final
Ontario 1 (King) 🔨	0	3	1	1	1	0	1	0	X	X	7
Prince Edward Island (Schut)	0	0	0	0	0	1	0	1	X	X	2

Sheet H	1	2	3	4	5	6	7	8	9	10	Final
Manitoba 2 (Freeman) 🔨	0	0	0	3	0	0	0	2	0	1	6
Quebec 2 (Girard)	0	0	0	0	0	2	1	0	2	0	5

=== Playoffs ===
Quarterfinals
B2	Nova Scotia	4
A3	Northern Ontario	9
A2	Manitoba 2	4
B3	Ontario 2	8

Semifinals
A1	Manitoba 1	6
A3	Northern Ontario	7
B1	Alberta 2	7
B3	Ontario 2	1

Final
A3	Northern Ontario	4
B1	Alberta 2	7
Bronze medal game
A1	Manitoba 1	7
B3	Ontario 2	4

==== Quarterfinals ====
Saturday, April 1, 1:00 pm

Sheet C	1	2	3	4	5	6	7	8	9	10	Final
Nova Scotia (MacIsaac)	0	2	0	0	1	0	1	0	X	X	4
Northern Ontario (Burgess) 🔨	1	0	4	1	0	2	0	1	X	X	9

Sheet D	1	2	3	4	5	6	7	8	9	10	Final
Manitoba 2 (Freeman) 🔨	0	0	2	0	2	0	0	0	0	0	4
Ontario 2 (Rooney)	0	0	0	2	0	1	0	1	2	2	8

==== Semifinals ====
Saturday, April 1, 7:00 pm

Sheet B	1	2	3	4	5	6	7	8	9	10	Final
Alberta 2 (Tao) 🔨	0	3	1	0	1	1	0	1	X	X	7
Ontario 2 (Rooney)	0	0	0	0	0	0	1	0	X	X	1

Sheet D	1	2	3	4	5	6	7	8	9	10	11	Final
Manitoba 1 (McDonald) 🔨	0	0	1	0	0	2	0	2	1	0	0	6
Northern Ontario (Burgess)	1	1	0	1	1	0	2	0	0	0	1	7

==== Bronze medal game ====
Sunday, April 2, 11:00 am

Sheet E	1	2	3	4	5	6	7	8	9	10	Final
Manitoba 1 (McDonald) 🔨	0	1	0	2	1	0	0	2	0	1	7
Ontario 2 (Rooney)	0	0	1	0	0	1	1	0	1	0	4

==== Final ====
Sunday, April 2, 11:00 am

Sheet C	1	2	3	4	5	6	7	8	9	10	Final
Northern Ontario (Burgess)	0	1	0	2	0	1	0	0	0	X	4
Alberta 2 (Tao) 🔨	2	0	1	0	0	0	1	2	1	X	7

=== Final standings ===
Place	Team
1st place, gold medalist(s)	Alberta 2
2nd place, silver medalist(s)	Northern Ontario
3rd place, bronze medalist(s)	Manitoba 1
4	Ontario 2
5	Nova Scotia
6	Manitoba 2
7	British Columbia 1
8	Newfoundland and Labrador 2
9	Alberta 1
10	Saskatchewan 1
11	Ontario 1
12	New Brunswick
13	Quebec 2
14	Saskatchewan 2
15	Newfoundland and Labrador 1
16	Prince Edward Island
17	Quebec 1
18	British Columbia 2

== Women ==
=== Teams ===
The teams are listed as follows:

Province / Territory	Skip	Third	Second	Lead	Alternate	Club(s)
Alberta 1	Myla Plett	Alyssa Nedohin	Chloe Fediuk	Allie Iskiw		Airdrie / Sherwood Park
Alberta 2	Claire Booth	Kaylee Raniseth	Raelyn Helston	Lauren Miller		The Glencoe Club, Calgary
British Columbia	Emily Bowles	Meredith Cole	Mahra Harris	Sasha Wilson		Victoria CC, Victoria
Manitoba 1	Zoey Terrick	Jaycee Terrick	Jensen Letham	Tessa Terrick		Heather CC, Winnipeg
Manitoba 2	Emily Ogg (Fourth)	Grace Beaudry (Skip)	Maddy Hollins	Mackenzie Arbuckle	Julia Millan	St. Vital CC, Winnipeg
New Brunswick 1	Jenna Campbell	Olivia Wynter	Izzy Paterson	Rebecca Watson		Capital WC, Fredericton
New Brunswick 2	Mélodie Forsythe	Carly Smith	Deanna MacDonald	Caylee Smith		Moncton / Fredericton
Newfoundland and Labrador	Mackenzie Mitchell	Sarah McNeil Lamswood	Kate Paterson	Emily Neary		St. John's CC, St. John's
Northern Ontario	Bella Croisier	Celeste Gauthier	Dominique Vivier	Piper Croisier		Northern Credit Union CC, Sudbury
Northwest Territories	Reese Wainman	Alexandria Testart-Campbell	Brooke Smith	Tamara Bain		Inuvik CC, Inuvik
Nova Scotia 1	Sophie Blades	Kate Weissent	Stephanie Atherton	Alexis Cluney		Chester CC, Chester
Nova Scotia 2	Allyson MacNutt	Lauren Ferguson	Alison Umlah	Isabella Tatlock		Halifax CC, Halifax
Ontario	Tori Zemmelink	Paige Bown	Kailee Delaney	Scotia Maltman	Emma Artichuk	Navan CC, Navan
Prince Edward Island	Ella Lenentine	Makiya Noonan	Kacey Gauthier	Erika Pater		Cornwall CC, Cornwall
Quebec 1	Anne-Sophie Gionest	Sarah Bergeron	Léanne Fortin	Juliette Bergeron		Riverbend / Chicoutimi / Kénogami
Quebec 2	Elizabeth Cyr	Stella-Rose Venne	Amber Gargul	Alexandra Legault	Hannah Gargul	Pointe-Claire / Laval
Saskatchewan	Elizabeth Kessel	Tesa Silversides	Mya Silversides	Hannah Rugg	Claudia Lacell	Highland CC, Regina
Yukon	Bayly Scoffin	Taylor Legge	Dannika Mikkelsen	Neizha Snider		Whitehorse CC, Whitehorse

=== Round robin standings ===
Final Round Robin Standings

Key
Teams to Playoffs

Pool A	Skip	W	L	W–L	DSC
Newfoundland and Labrador	Mackenzie Mitchell	7	1	–	801.3
Ontario	Tori Zemmelink	6	2	1–0	601.4
Nova Scotia 1	Sophie Blades	6	2	0–1	396.9
Manitoba 2	Grace Beaudry	5	3	–	803.0
Prince Edward Island	Ella Lenentine	4	4	–	1413.8
Quebec 1	Anne-Sophie Gionest	3	5	1–0	1260.1
New Brunswick 2	Mélodie Forsythe	3	5	0–1	1367.3
New Brunswick 1	Jenna Campbell	2	6	–	1137.6
Northwest Territories	Reese Wainman	0	8	–	1051.2

Pool B	Skip	W	L	W–L	DSC
Alberta 1	Myla Plett	8	0	–	617.0
Manitoba 1	Zoey Terrick	6	2	–	906.8
Alberta 2	Claire Booth	5	3	–	595.6
Quebec 2	Elizabeth Cyr	4	4	1–0	655.7
Northern Ontario	Bella Croisier	4	4	0–1	813.7
British Columbia	Emily Bowles	3	5	1–0	1447.8
Nova Scotia 2	Allyson MacNutt	3	5	0–1	962.1
Saskatchewan	Elizabeth Kessel	2	6	–	689.1
Yukon	Bayly Scoffin	1	7	–	904.2

=== Round robin results ===
All draw times are listed in Eastern Time (UTC−04:00).

==== Draw 2 ====
Sunday, March 26, 8:00 pm

Sheet A	1	2	3	4	5	6	7	8	9	10	Final
Quebec 1 (Gionest) 🔨	1	0	0	1	0	2	2	0	X	X	6
Nova Scotia 1 (Blades)	0	3	2	0	4	0	0	5	X	X	14

Sheet B	1	2	3	4	5	6	7	8	9	10	Final
New Brunswick 1 (Campbell) 🔨	0	2	1	4	0	2	0	4	X	X	13
Northwest Territories (Wainman)	1	0	0	0	1	0	3	0	X	X	5

Sheet C	1	2	3	4	5	6	7	8	9	10	Final
Manitoba 2 (Beaudry)	0	0	1	0	1	0	0	2	1	0	5
Ontario (Zemmelink) 🔨	0	0	0	1	0	2	2	0	0	1	6

Sheet D	1	2	3	4	5	6	7	8	9	10	Final
Newfoundland and Labrador (Mitchell)	0	0	3	0	1	0	0	2	0	X	6
New Brunswick 2 (Forsythe) 🔨	1	0	0	0	0	2	0	0	0	X	3

Sheet E	1	2	3	4	5	6	7	8	9	10	Final
Saskatchewan (Kessel) 🔨	0	1	0	2	0	0	1	2	0	X	6
Alberta 1 (Plett)	2	0	2	0	3	2	0	0	2	X	11

Sheet F	1	2	3	4	5	6	7	8	9	10	Final
Manitoba 1 (Terrick) 🔨	0	0	3	0	0	0	2	1	1	0	7
Yukon (Scoffin)	1	0	0	2	1	1	0	0	0	1	6

Sheet G	1	2	3	4	5	6	7	8	9	10	Final
Alberta 2 (Booth) 🔨	1	0	0	1	0	1	1	0	0	X	4
Northern Ontario (Croisier)	0	0	1	0	2	0	0	2	1	X	6

Sheet H	1	2	3	4	5	6	7	8	9	10	Final
Nova Scotia 2 (MacNutt)	0	0	0	0	2	0	2	2	2	0	8
Quebec 2 (Cyr) 🔨	1	1	2	1	0	3	0	0	0	2	10

==== Draw 4 ====
Monday, March 27, 2:00 pm

Sheet A	1	2	3	4	5	6	7	8	9	10	Final
New Brunswick 1 (Campbell) 🔨	0	0	0	0	1	0	0	1	0	X	2
Newfoundland and Labrador (Mitchell)	1	1	1	2	0	1	0	0	1	X	7

Sheet B	1	2	3	4	5	6	7	8	9	10	Final
Prince Edward Island (Lenentine)	0	1	0	0	0	0	1	0	X	X	2
Manitoba 2 (Beaudry) 🔨	2	0	2	1	1	1	0	2	X	X	9

Sheet C	1	2	3	4	5	6	7	8	9	10	Final
New Brunswick 2 (Forsythe) 🔨	2	0	0	1	0	3	0	0	1	0	7
Nova Scotia 1 (Blades)	0	2	0	0	1	0	0	3	0	2	8

Sheet D	1	2	3	4	5	6	7	8	9	10	Final
Northwest Territories (Wainman)	0	0	0	0	0	1	0	0	X	X	1
Ontario (Zemmelink) 🔨	0	1	0	3	1	0	5	1	X	X	11

Sheet E	1	2	3	4	5	6	7	8	9	10	Final
Manitoba 1 (Terrick) 🔨	0	1	0	0	1	1	0	1	0	1	5
Nova Scotia 2 (MacNutt)	0	0	0	1	0	0	0	0	2	0	3

Sheet F	1	2	3	4	5	6	7	8	9	10	Final
British Columbia (Bowles)	0	0	0	1	0	0	0	2	X	X	3
Alberta 2 (Booth) 🔨	2	0	0	0	3	2	3	0	X	X	10

Sheet G	1	2	3	4	5	6	7	8	9	10	Final
Quebec 2 (Cyr)	0	1	0	0	1	0	0	2	X	X	4
Alberta 1 (Plett) 🔨	3	0	2	2	0	2	1	0	X	X	10

Sheet H	1	2	3	4	5	6	7	8	9	10	Final
Yukon (Scoffin)	2	2	0	1	0	1	0	0	0	0	6
Northern Ontario (Croisier) 🔨	0	0	1	0	1	0	3	1	1	3	10

==== Draw 6 ====
Tuesday, March 28, 9:00 am

Sheet A	1	2	3	4	5	6	7	8	9	10	Final
Yukon (Scoffin) 🔨	2	0	0	3	0	4	0	2	2	X	13
Quebec 2 (Cyr)	0	0	2	0	2	0	1	0	0	X	5

Sheet B	1	2	3	4	5	6	7	8	9	10	Final
Nova Scotia 2 (MacNutt)	0	0	2	0	3	1	2	0	0	0	8
Saskatchewan (Kessel) 🔨	0	1	0	2	0	0	0	2	1	1	7

Sheet C	1	2	3	4	5	6	7	8	9	10	Final
British Columbia (Bowles)	0	0	1	0	2	0	1	0	X	X	4
Manitoba 1 (Terrick) 🔨	2	1	0	2	0	3	0	2	X	X	10

Sheet D	1	2	3	4	5	6	7	8	9	10	11	Final
Alberta 1 (Plett) 🔨	1	0	0	0	1	0	2	1	0	1	1	7
Alberta 2 (Booth)	0	1	1	1	0	1	0	0	2	0	0	6

Sheet E	1	2	3	4	5	6	7	8	9	10	Final
Northwest Territories (Wainman) 🔨	1	0	0	0	0	0	1	0	X	X	2
New Brunswick 2 (Forsythe)	0	3	1	0	0	1	0	3	X	X	8

Sheet F	1	2	3	4	5	6	7	8	9	10	Final
Newfoundland and Labrador (Mitchell)	2	0	3	0	1	0	0	3	X	X	9
Quebec 1 (Gionest) 🔨	0	0	0	1	0	1	1	0	X	X	3

Sheet G	1	2	3	4	5	6	7	8	9	10	Final
Prince Edward Island (Lenentine)	0	3	2	0	1	0	2	2	X	X	10
New Brunswick 1 (Campbell) 🔨	1	0	0	2	0	1	0	0	X	X	4

Sheet H	1	2	3	4	5	6	7	8	9	10	Final
Nova Scotia 1 (Blades) 🔨	2	0	0	2	0	2	0	3	0	1	10
Manitoba 2 (Beaudry)	0	1	1	0	2	0	1	0	3	0	8

==== Draw 8 ====
Tuesday, March 28, 7:00 pm

Sheet A	1	2	3	4	5	6	7	8	9	10	Final
Alberta 1 (Plett) 🔨	2	0	0	0	3	0	2	3	0	X	10
British Columbia (Bowles)	0	1	1	3	0	0	0	0	1	X	6

Sheet B	1	2	3	4	5	6	7	8	9	10	11	Final
Quebec 2 (Cyr) 🔨	0	2	0	0	0	2	0	1	1	0	1	7
Northern Ontario (Croisier)	0	0	3	0	1	0	1	0	0	1	0	6

Sheet C	1	2	3	4	5	6	7	8	9	10	Final
Nova Scotia 2 (MacNutt)	0	2	1	2	0	4	0	1	1	X	11
Yukon (Scoffin) 🔨	1	0	0	0	2	0	1	0	0	X	4

Sheet D	1	2	3	4	5	6	7	8	9	10	Final
Manitoba 1 (Terrick)	0	2	0	0	0	1	0	0	0	X	3
Saskatchewan (Kessel) 🔨	2	0	0	1	1	0	1	1	1	X	7

Sheet E	1	2	3	4	5	6	7	8	9	10	Final
Nova Scotia 1 (Blades) 🔨	2	0	0	2	1	0	2	0	0	X	7
Prince Edward Island (Lenentine)	0	1	1	0	0	1	0	0	1	X	4

Sheet F	1	2	3	4	5	6	7	8	9	10	Final
New Brunswick 2 (Forsythe) 🔨	0	0	1	1	0	0	1	0	X	X	3
Ontario (Zemmelink)	0	0	0	0	4	1	0	3	X	X	8

Sheet G	1	2	3	4	5	6	7	8	9	10	Final
Newfoundland and Labrador (Mitchell) 🔨	1	0	0	1	1	0	1	0	2	0	6
Northwest Territories (Wainman)	0	0	1	0	0	2	0	1	0	1	5

Sheet H	1	2	3	4	5	6	7	8	9	10	Final
New Brunswick 1 (Campbell) 🔨	0	0	3	1	0	2	0	3	1	X	10
Quebec 1 (Gionest)	2	1	0	0	2	0	1	0	0	X	6

==== Draw 10 ====
Wednesday, March 29, 2:00 pm

Sheet A	1	2	3	4	5	6	7	8	9	10	Final
Ontario (Zemmelink) 🔨	1	1	0	2	0	1	1	0	0	2	8
New Brunswick 1 (Campbell)	0	0	1	0	1	0	0	1	1	0	4

Sheet B	1	2	3	4	5	6	7	8	9	10	Final
Northwest Territories (Wainman) 🔨	0	0	0	2	0	1	0	1	X	X	4
Nova Scotia 1 (Blades)	3	1	3	0	3	0	4	0	X	X	14

Sheet C	1	2	3	4	5	6	7	8	9	10	Final
Quebec 1 (Gionest)	0	0	1	1	0	0	0	0	X	X	2
Manitoba 2 (Beaudry) 🔨	2	3	0	0	4	2	1	0	X	X	12

Sheet D	1	2	3	4	5	6	7	8	9	10	Final
Prince Edward Island (Lenentine)	0	1	1	0	0	0	0	1	0	X	3
Newfoundland and Labrador (Mitchell) 🔨	1	0	0	2	1	1	0	0	2	X	7

Sheet E	1	2	3	4	5	6	7	8	9	10	Final
Northern Ontario (Croisier)	0	0	3	1	0	0	0	0	1	X	5
Manitoba 1 (Terrick) 🔨	0	1	0	0	2	1	1	2	0	X	7

Sheet F	1	2	3	4	5	6	7	8	9	10	Final
Yukon (Scoffin)	0	0	1	0	0	1	0	2	X	X	4
Alberta 1 (Plett) 🔨	0	4	0	2	1	0	5	0	X	X	12

Sheet G	1	2	3	4	5	6	7	8	9	10	Final
Saskatchewan (Kessel) 🔨	0	0	0	0	0	0	0	0	X	X	0
Alberta 2 (Booth)	0	0	1	0	1	3	3	1	X	X	9

Sheet H	1	2	3	4	5	6	7	8	9	10	Final
British Columbia (Bowles) 🔨	0	0	3	0	0	1	1	1	0	1	7
Nova Scotia 2 (MacNutt)	0	1	0	1	1	0	0	0	1	0	4

==== Draw 12 ====
Thursday, March 30, 9:00 am

Sheet A	1	2	3	4	5	6	7	8	9	10	Final
Manitoba 2 (Beaudry)	0	2	0	4	0	2	0	4	X	X	12
Northwest Territories (Wainman) 🔨	2	0	0	0	1	0	1	0	X	X	4

Sheet B	1	2	3	4	5	6	7	8	9	10	Final
Quebec 1 (Gionest)	0	0	0	2	0	0	0	0	1	X	3
Prince Edward Island (Lenentine) 🔨	0	1	1	0	0	0	1	2	0	X	5

Sheet C	1	2	3	4	5	6	7	8	9	10	Final
New Brunswick 1 (Campbell)	0	0	2	0	2	0	0	1	0	X	5
New Brunswick 2 (Forsythe) 🔨	2	1	0	2	0	1	0	0	3	X	9

Sheet D	1	2	3	4	5	6	7	8	9	10	Final
Ontario (Zemmelink)	0	2	1	1	0	3	0	3	0	2	12
Nova Scotia 1 (Blades) 🔨	2	0	0	0	3	0	1	0	2	0	8

Sheet E	1	2	3	4	5	6	7	8	9	10	Final
Alberta 2 (Booth) 🔨	2	1	0	5	2	0	1	0	X	X	11
Yukon (Scoffin)	0	0	1	0	0	2	0	1	X	X	4

Sheet F	1	2	3	4	5	6	7	8	9	10	Final
Saskatchewan (Kessel)	0	0	2	0	1	0	0	1	0	0	4
British Columbia (Bowles) 🔨	0	1	0	1	0	2	0	0	3	3	10

Sheet G	1	2	3	4	5	6	7	8	9	10	Final
Manitoba 1 (Terrick)	0	0	0	2	0	2	1	0	2	X	7
Quebec 2 (Cyr) 🔨	0	0	2	0	1	0	0	1	0	X	4

Sheet H	1	2	3	4	5	6	7	8	9	10	Final
Northern Ontario (Croisier)	0	0	3	0	1	0	0	1	X	X	5
Alberta 1 (Plett) 🔨	2	1	0	2	0	6	3	0	X	X	14

==== Draw 14 ====
Thursday, March 30, 7:00 pm

Sheet A	1	2	3	4	5	6	7	8	9	10	Final
Quebec 2 (Cyr)	0	0	0	2	2	0	0	4	0	X	8
Saskatchewan (Kessel) 🔨	1	0	0	0	0	1	1	0	2	X	5

Sheet B	1	2	3	4	5	6	7	8	9	10	Final
Northern Ontario (Croisier) 🔨	0	0	0	3	0	1	0	0	0	X	4
Nova Scotia 2 (MacNutt)	1	2	1	0	1	0	1	1	1	X	8

Sheet C	1	2	3	4	5	6	7	8	9	10	11	Final
Yukon (Scoffin) 🔨	1	1	0	1	1	1	0	0	1	0	0	6
British Columbia (Bowles)	0	0	1	0	0	0	2	1	0	2	1	7

Sheet D	1	2	3	4	5	6	7	8	9	10	Final
Alberta 2 (Booth) 🔨	2	0	2	0	0	0	0	0	X	X	4
Manitoba 1 (Terrick)	0	2	0	0	2	3	1	2	X	X	10

Sheet E	1	2	3	4	5	6	7	8	9	10	11	Final
New Brunswick 2 (Forsythe) 🔨	1	0	0	0	1	0	1	0	0	1	0	4
Quebec 1 (Gionest)	0	0	0	1	0	1	0	1	1	0	1	5

Sheet F	1	2	3	4	5	6	7	8	9	10	11	Final
Ontario (Zemmelink)	0	1	0	3	1	0	0	0	0	1	0	6
Newfoundland and Labrador (Mitchell) 🔨	2	0	1	0	0	1	1	1	0	0	1	7

Sheet G	1	2	3	4	5	6	7	8	9	10	Final
Northwest Territories (Wainman)	1	1	0	1	0	0	0	0	0	X	3
Prince Edward Island (Lenentine) 🔨	0	0	2	0	0	0	3	2	2	X	9

Sheet H	1	2	3	4	5	6	7	8	9	10	Final
Manitoba 2 (Beaudry) 🔨	0	0	1	0	2	0	1	2	0	2	8
New Brunswick 1 (Campbell)	1	1	0	1	0	2	0	0	1	0	6

==== Draw 16 ====
Friday, March 31, 2:00 pm

Sheet A	1	2	3	4	5	6	7	8	9	10	11	Final
Prince Edward Island (Lenentine)	1	0	0	2	0	1	0	0	1	1	0	6
Ontario (Zemmelink) 🔨	0	0	1	0	3	0	2	0	0	0	2	8

Sheet B	1	2	3	4	5	6	7	8	9	10	Final
Manitoba 2 (Beaudry) 🔨	1	0	0	3	0	2	0	0	0	0	6
New Brunswick 2 (Forsythe)	0	1	0	0	2	0	2	1	1	1	8

Sheet C	1	2	3	4	5	6	7	8	9	10	Final
Nova Scotia 1 (Blades) 🔨	3	0	2	0	1	0	1	1	0	0	8
Newfoundland and Labrador (Mitchell)	0	1	0	2	0	2	0	0	4	1	10

Sheet D	1	2	3	4	5	6	7	8	9	10	Final
Quebec 1 (Gionest) 🔨	3	0	1	0	3	0	3	0	X	X	10
Northwest Territories (Wainman)	0	1	0	1	0	1	0	1	X	X	4

Sheet E	1	2	3	4	5	6	7	8	9	10	11	Final
British Columbia (Bowles) 🔨	2	0	0	1	0	1	0	2	0	2	0	8
Northern Ontario (Croisier)	0	2	2	0	2	0	2	0	0	0	1	9

Sheet F	1	2	3	4	5	6	7	8	9	10	Final
Alberta 2 (Booth)	0	2	1	1	1	3	0	3	X	X	11
Quebec 2 (Cyr) 🔨	2	0	0	0	0	0	1	0	X	X	3

Sheet G	1	2	3	4	5	6	7	8	9	10	Final
Alberta 1 (Plett)	5	1	0	1	1	0	4	0	X	X	12
Nova Scotia 2 (MacNutt) 🔨	0	0	1	0	0	3	0	2	X	X	6

Sheet H	1	2	3	4	5	6	7	8	9	10	Final
Saskatchewan (Kessel) 🔨	5	0	2	0	0	0	4	0	2	X	13
Yukon (Scoffin)	0	1	0	2	1	1	0	3	0	X	8

==== Draw 18 ====
Saturday, April 1, 9:00 am

Sheet A	1	2	3	4	5	6	7	8	9	10	Final
Nova Scotia 2 (MacNutt)	0	1	1	0	1	0	0	2	1	0	6
Alberta 2 (Booth) 🔨	2	0	0	1	0	1	1	0	0	2	7

Sheet B	1	2	3	4	5	6	7	8	9	10	Final
Alberta 1 (Plett) 🔨	3	0	1	0	1	0	0	2	0	2	9
Manitoba 1 (Terrick)	0	2	0	1	0	1	2	0	1	0	7

Sheet C	1	2	3	4	5	6	7	8	9	10	Final
Northern Ontario (Croisier)	1	1	1	0	1	0	0	0	5	X	9
Saskatchewan (Kessel) 🔨	0	0	0	1	0	0	1	0	0	X	2

Sheet D	1	2	3	4	5	6	7	8	9	10	Final
Quebec 2 (Cyr) 🔨	0	2	0	3	1	0	1	0	2	X	9
British Columbia (Bowles)	0	0	2	0	0	1	0	1	0	X	4

Sheet E	1	2	3	4	5	6	7	8	9	10	Final
Newfoundland and Labrador (Mitchell)	0	2	0	0	0	1	1	0	0	X	4
Manitoba 2 (Beaudry) 🔨	1	0	0	0	4	0	0	1	2	X	8

Sheet F	1	2	3	4	5	6	7	8	9	10	Final
Nova Scotia 1 (Blades) 🔨	3	1	0	0	3	0	1	1	1	X	10
New Brunswick 1 (Campbell)	0	0	4	2	0	1	0	0	0	X	7

Sheet G	1	2	3	4	5	6	7	8	9	10	Final
Ontario (Zemmelink) 🔨	4	0	1	0	0	0	1	0	0	0	6
Quebec 1 (Gionest)	0	1	0	2	1	0	0	1	1	1	7

Sheet H	1	2	3	4	5	6	7	8	9	10	Final
New Brunswick 2 (Forsythe)	0	0	2	0	0	0	3	0	2	0	7
Prince Edward Island (Lenentine) 🔨	0	3	0	0	2	2	0	0	0	4	11

=== Playoffs ===
Quarterfinals
B2	Manitoba 1	13
A3	Nova Scotia 1	9
A2	Ontario	7
B3	Alberta 2	6

Semifinals
A1	Newfoundland and Labrador	7
B2	Manitoba 1	6
B1	Alberta 1	11
A2	Ontario	3

Final
A1	Newfoundland and Labrador	4
B1	Alberta 1	10
Bronze medal game
B2	Manitoba 1	8
A2	Ontario	6

==== Quarterfinals ====
Saturday, April 1, 7:00 pm

Sheet A	1	2	3	4	5	6	7	8	9	10	Final
Manitoba 1 (Terrick) 🔨	1	0	0	2	3	0	3	0	4	X	13
Nova Scotia 1 (Blades)	0	0	5	0	0	2	0	2	0	X	9

Sheet C	1	2	3	4	5	6	7	8	9	10	11	Final
Ontario (Zemmerlink) 🔨	1	0	0	1	0	0	3	0	0	1	1	7
Alberta 2 (Booth)	0	1	0	0	1	1	0	2	1	0	0	6

==== Semifinals ====
Sunday, April 2, 9:00 am

Sheet B	1	2	3	4	5	6	7	8	9	10	Final
Alberta 1 (Plett) 🔨	2	0	1	1	0	2	3	2	X	X	11
Ontario (Zemmerlink)	0	1	0	0	2	0	0	0	X	X	3

Sheet D	1	2	3	4	5	6	7	8	9	10	Final
Newfoundland and Labrador (Mitchell) 🔨	1	0	2	0	1	0	0	2	0	1	7
Manitoba 1 (Terrick)	0	1	0	2	0	1	1	0	1	0	6

==== Bronze medal game ====
Sunday, April 2, 3:00 pm

Sheet D	1	2	3	4	5	6	7	8	9	10	Final
Manitoba 1 (Terrick)	0	2	1	0	1	0	1	0	3	X	8
Ontario (Zemmerlink) 🔨	1	0	0	1	0	1	0	3	0	X	6

==== Final ====
Sunday, April 2, 3:00 pm

Sheet C	1	2	3	4	5	6	7	8	9	10	Final
Newfoundland and Labrador (Mitchell)	0	1	0	0	2	0	1	0	X	X	4
Alberta 1 (Plett) 🔨	3	0	1	3	0	1	0	2	X	X	10

=== Final standings ===
Place	Team
1st place, gold medalist(s)	Alberta 1
2nd place, silver medalist(s)	Newfoundland and Labrador
3rd place, bronze medalist(s)	Manitoba 1
4	Ontario
5	Nova Scotia 1
6	Alberta 2
7	Manitoba 2
8	Quebec 2
9	Northern Ontario
10	Prince Edward Island
11	Quebec 1
12	British Columbia
13	Nova Scotia 2
14	New Brunswick 2
15	Saskatchewan
16	New Brunswick 1
17	Yukon
18	Northwest Territories

== Qualification ==
=== Alberta ===
The Alberta U20 Junior Provincials were held from January 24–29, 2023 at the Spruce Grove Curling Club in Spruce Grove (men's) and the Ellerslie Curling Club in Edmonton (women's).

The championship was held in a round robin format, which qualified three teams for a championship round. Two men's teams and two women's teams qualified for the national championship.

Pre-Playoff Results:

Men	W	L
James Ballance (Okotoks/Lethbridge)	6	1
Johnson Tao (Saville)	5	2
Kenan Wipf (Cochrane/St. Albert)	4	3
Kinley Burton (Granite)	4	3
Zachary Davies (Saville/Sherwood Park/Okotoks)	4	3
Justin Runciman (Leduc)	4	3
Evan Crough (Okotoks)	1	6
Beau Cornelson (Rose City)	0	7

Women	W	L
Claire Booth (Glencoe)	6	1
Chloe Johnston (Okotoks)	5	2
Myla Plett (Airdrie/Sherwood Park)	5	2
Elliot Martens (North Hill/Lacombe/Lethbridge)	4	3
Emma Yarmuch (Ellerslie)	3	4
Kayleigh Shannon (Lethbridge/North Hill)	3	4
Sydney Libbus (Sherwood Park)	2	5
Irelande McMahon (North Hill)	0	7

Playoff Results:

- Men's Tiebreaker 1: Wipf 4 – Davies 7
- Men's Tiebreaker 2: Burton 8 – Runciman 6
- Men's Tiebreaker 3: Davies 5 – Burton 4
- Men's Semifinal: Tao 10 – Davies 3
- Men's Final: Ballance 6 – Tao 4
- Women's Semifinal: Johnston 3 – Plett 7
- Women's Final: Booth 6 – Plett 8

=== British Columbia ===
The BC U21 Junior Championships were held from January 26–29, 2023 at the Duncan Curling Club in Duncan.

The championship was held in a modified triple-knockout format, which qualified three teams for a championship round. Two men's teams qualified for the national championship.

Pre-Playoff Results:

Men	W	L
Adam Fenton (Royal City)	2	0
Nolan Blaeser (Vernon)	2	1
Thomas Reed (Golden Ears)	1	2
Calder Fadden (Kamloops/Parksville)	1	3

Women	W	L
Emily Bowles (Victoria)	2	0
Holly Hafeli (Kamloops)	2	1
Bryelle Wong (Royal City/Vancouver)	3	2
Elizabeth Bowles (Equimalt/Victoria/Delta Thistle/Royal City)	3	3
Keelie Duncan (Comox/Duncan/Richmond)	2	3
Kaelen Coles-Lyster (Golden Ears/Victoria/Vernon)	0	3

Playoff Results:

- Men's Semifinal: Blaeser 3 – Reed 5
- Men's Final: Fenton 6 – Reed 3
- Women's Semifinal: Hafeli 10 – Wong 1
- Women's Final: Bowles 9 – Hafeli 8

=== Manitoba ===
The Telus Junior Provincial Championships were held from January 17–21, 2023 at the Portage Curling Club in Portage la Prairie, Manitoba.

The men's championship was held in a round robin format, while the women's event was held in a modified triple-knockout format, which qualified four teams for a page-playoff championship round. Two men's teams and two women's teams qualified for the national championship.

Pre-Playoff Results:

Men	W	L
Asham Black Pool
Jordon McDonald (Deer Lodge)	4	0
Ronan Peterson (Heather)	3	1
Hunter Dundas (Brandon)	2	2
Tanner Graham (Heather)	1	3
Jonathan Kostna (Pembina)	0	4
Asham Express Red Pool
Jace Freeman (Virden)	4	0
Colton Olafson (Portage)	2	2
Aaron Van Ryssel (Springfield)	2	2
Luke Robins (West St. Paul)	1	3
Zach Norris (Morris)	1	3

Women	W	L
Zoey Terrick (Heather)	3	0
Grace Beaudry (St. Vital)	4	1
Tansy Tober (Fort Garry)	4	2
Cheynne Ehnes (Pembina)	3	2
Shaela Hayward (Carman)	3	3
Dayna Wahl (Altona)	3	3
Katy Lukowich (Granite)	2	3
Morgan Maguet (East St. Paul)	2	3
Rylie Buchalter (Heather)	1	3
Julia Van Ryssel (Springfield)	1	3
Bethany Allan (Granite)	0	3

Playoff Results:

- Men's A1 vs B1: McDonald 9 – Freeman 1
- Men's A2 vs B2: Peterson 9 – Olafson 1
- Men's Semifinal: Freeman 7 – Peterson 2
- Men's Final: McDonald 8 – Freeman 7
- Women's A vs B: Terrick 6 – Beaudry 8
- Women's C1 vs C2: Tober 9 – Ehnes 10
- Women's Semifinal: Terrick 7 – Ehnes 3
- Women's Final: Beaudry 8 – Terrick 9

=== New Brunswick ===
The Junior U21 Championships were held from January 27–30, 2023 at the Thistle-St. Andrews Curling Club in Saint John.

The championship was held in a modified triple-knockout format, which qualified three teams for a championship round. Two women's teams qualified for the national championship.

Pre-Playoff Results:

Men	W	L
Timothy Marin (TSA)	3	2
Jamie Stewart (Moncton)	4	1
Luke Robichaud (Capital/Woodstock)	1	3
Sahil Dalrymple (Gage)	1	3

Women	W	L
Jenna Campbell (Capital)	5	1
Mélodie Forsythe (Moncton/Capital)	4	2
Paige Brewer (TSA)	3	3
Sarah Gaines (Gage)	3	3
Lauren Price (Capital)	0	3
Mya Pugsley (Moncton)	0	3

Playoff Results:

- Men's Semifinal: Marin 7 – Stewart 3
- Men's Final: Stewart 4 – Marin 6
- Women's Semifinal: Campbell 3 – Forsythe 7
- Women's Final: Campbell 8 – Forsythe 3

=== Newfoundland and Labrador ===
The U21 Juniors were held from January 18–22, 2023 at the Bally Haly Golf & Curling Club in St. John's.

The men's championship was held in a round robin format, which qualified three teams for a championship round. The women's event was held in a best-of-five series between two rinks. Two men's teams qualified for the national championship.

Pre-Playoff Results:

Men	W	L
Simon Perry (RE/MAX)	3	1
Nathan Young (RE/MAX)	3	1
Sean O'Leary (RE/MAX)	2	2
Parker Tipple (RE/MAX)	1	3
Liam Quinlan (Bally Haly)	1	3

Women	W	L
Mackenzie Mitchell (RE/MAX)	3	0
Cailey Locke (RE/MAX)	0	3

Playoff Results:

- Men's Semifinal: Young 9 – O'Leary 5
- Men's Final: Perry 9 – Young 1

=== Northern Ontario ===
The Best Western U21 Junior Provincials were held from March 1–5, 2023 at the Fort William Curling Club in Thunder Bay.

The men's championship was held in a double round robin format, while the women's event was held in a best-of-five series between two rinks.

Pre-Playoff Results:

Men	W	L
Dallas Burgess (Port Arthur)	4	0
Brendan Rajala (Northern Credit Union)	1	3
Ian Deschene (Northern Credit Union)	1	3

Women	W	L
Bella Croisier (Northern Credit Union)	3	0
Carrie Allen (Kakabeka Falls)	0	3

Playoff Results:

- Men's Tiebreaker: Rajala 3 – Deschene 9
- Men's Final: Burgess 7 – Deschene 3

=== Northwest Territories ===
- Men's Team: No men's team declared
- Women's Team: Reese Wainman (Inuvik)

=== Nova Scotia ===
The Under 21 Provincial Championship was held from January 11–15, 2023 at the Truro Curling Club in Truro.

The championship was held in a modified triple-knockout format, which qualified three teams for a championship round. Two women's teams qualified for the national championship.

Pre-Playoff Results:

Men	W	L
Nick Mosher (Halifax)	6	1
Calan MacIsaac (Truro)	4	2
Aden Kavanaugh (Halifax)	2	3
Jack Higdon (New Glasgow)	2	3
Joel Krats (Chester)	1	3
Mark Strang (Lakeshore)	0	3

Women	W	L
Allyson MacNutt (Halifax)	5	2
Sophie Blades (Chester)	5	1
Marin Callaghan (Mayflower)	3	3
Cassidy Blades (Halifax)	2	3
Olivia McDonah (Truro)	2	3
Rebecca Regan (Lakeshore)	1	3
Abby Slauenwhite (Bridgewater)	0	3

Playoff Results:

- Men's Semifinal: MacIsaac 7 – Mosher 6
- Men's Final: Mosher 7 – MacIsaac 8
- Women's Semifinal: MacNutt 7 – Blades 8
- Women's Final: Blades – Blades (N/A)

=== Ontario ===
The Ontario U-21 Curling Championships were held from March 8–12, 2023 at the RA Centre in Ottawa.

The championship was held in a round robin format, which qualified four teams for a championship round. Two men's teams qualified for the national championship.

Pre-Playoff Results:

Men	W	L
Pool A
Dylan Niepage (Guelph)	4	0
Nicholas Rowe (Ottawa Hunt)	2	2
Jett Gazeley (Cataraqui)	2	2
Matthew Prenevost (Leaside)	2	2
Jake Dobson (Burlington)	0	4
Pool B
Jayden King (RCMP)	4	0
Landan Rooney (Dixie)	3	1
Kyle Stratton (London)	2	2
Wyatt Wright (KW Granite)	1	3
Evan Madore (Quinte)	0	4

Women	W	L
Pool A
Tori Zemmelink (Navan)	4	0
Charlotte Johnston (Barrie)	2	2
Jenny Madden (Rideau)	2	2
Katrina Frlan (Huntley)	2	2
Logan Shaw (Grimsby)	0	4
Pool B
Ava Acres (RCMP)	3	1
Emily Deschenes (Rideau)	2	2
Emma Acres (RCMP)	2	2
Grace Cave (High Park)	2	2
Katelin Langford (Peterborough)	1	3

Playoff Results:

- Men's Tiebreaker: Rowe 4 – Gazeley 7
- Men's Semifinal 1: Niepage 5 – Rooney 11
- Men's Semifinal 2: King 6 – Gazeley 5
- Men's Final 1: King 8 – Rooney 5
- Men's Qualification Game: Niepage 9 – Gazeley 2
- Men's Final 2: Rooney 6 – Niepage 3
- Women's Tiebreaker 1: Johnston 2 – Madden 7
- Women's Tiebreaker 2: Deschenes 11 – E. Acres 4
- Women's Semifinal 1: Zemmelink 12 – Deschenes 3
- Women's Semifinal 2: A. Acres 5 – Madden 6
- Women's Final: Zemmelink 7 – Madden 6

=== Prince Edward Island ===
The PEI Pepsi Junior Curling Championships were held from January 11–15, 2023 at the Crapaud Curling Club in Crapaud.

The championship was held in a modified triple-knockout format, which qualified three teams for a championship round.

Pre-Playoff Results:

Men	W	L
Mitchell Schut (Cornwall)	6	0
Brayden Snow (Cornwall)	3	3
Brock Rochford (Summerside)	1	3
Isaiah Dalton (Cornwall)	1	3
Nate Shaw (Montague)	1	3

Women	W	L
Ella Lenentine (Cornwall)	6	0
Madalyn Easter (Summerside)	2	3
Rachel MacLean (Cornwall)	1	3
Sydney Carver (Montague)	0	3

Playoff Results:

- No playoff was required as Team Schut and Team Lenentine won all three qualifying events.

=== Quebec ===
The U21 Provincials were held from January 25–29, 2023 at the St-Lambert Curling Club in Saint-Lambert.

The championship was held in a round robin format, which qualified three teams for a championship round. Two men's teams and two women's teams qualified for the national championship.

Pre-Playoff Results:

Men	W	L
Adam Bédard (Noranda)	4	2
Dimitri Audibert (Etchemin)	4	2
Léandre Girard (Victoria /Trois-Rivières/Kénogami)	3	3
Philippe Jauron (Sept-Îles)	3	3
Raphaël Tremblay (Collines)	3	3
Marc-Antoine Robert (Rosemère)	3	3
Charles-Antoine Labbé (Bel-Aire)	1	5

Women	W	L
Anne-Sophie Gionest (Riverbend/Chicoutimi/Kénogami)	4	1
Jolianne Fortin (Kénogami)	4	1
Elizabeth Cyr (Pointe-Claire/Laval)	3	2
Lauren Cheal (Trois-Rivières/Buckingham/Lennoxville)	2	3
Mélianne Darveau (Jacques Cartier)	1	4
Sarah-Ann Daigle (Etchemin/St-Lambert/Victoria)	1	4

Playoff Results:

- Men's Tiebreaker: Girard 9 – Jauron 4
- Men's Final 1: Bédard 6 – Audibert 5
- Men's Final 2: Audibert 6 – Girard 7
- Women's Final 1: Gionest 9 – Fortin 4
- Women's Final 2: Fortin 3 – Cyr 10

=== Saskatchewan ===
The Junior Provincials were held from January 19–22, 2023 at the Swift Current Curling Club in Swift Current.

The men's championship was held in a round robin format, while the women's event was held in a modified triple-knockout format, which qualified four teams for a page-playoff championship round. Two men's teams qualified for the national championship.

Pre-Playoff Results:

Men	W	L
Matthew Drewitz (Note: Team Josh Bryden finished second at the Saskatchewan Junior Provincials, however, Team Matthew Drewitz represented Saskatchewan 2 at the national championship.) (Sutherland)	4	1
Josh Bryden (Regina)	3	2
Logan Ede (Martensville)	3	2
Brayden Heistad (Highland)	2	3
Brandon Zuravloff (Canora)	2	3
Dylan Derksen (Martensville)	1	4

Women	W	L
Elizabeth Kessel (Highland)	3	0
Madison Kleiter (Sutherland)	4	1
Jenna Pomedli (Wadena)	3	2
Cara Kesslering (Yorkton)	2	2
Savanna Taylor (Saskatoon)	2	3
Andra Todd (Hazlet)	1	3
Alyssa Resch (Swift Current)	1	3
Rachael Schlechter (Swift Current)	1	3

Playoff Results:

- Men's Tiebreaker: Heistad 6 – Zuravloff 8
- Men's 1 vs. 2: Drewitz 5 – Bryden 6
- Men's 3 vs. 4: Ede 9 – Zuravloff 1
- Men's Semifinal: Drewitz 5 – Ede 6
- Men's Final: Bryden 5 – Ede 10
- Women's 1 vs. 2: Kessel 5 – Kleiter 7
- Women's 3 vs. 4: Kesslering 9 – Pomedli 6
- Women's Semifinal: Kessel 6 – Kesslering 3
- Women's Final: Kleiter 7 – Kessel 11

=== Yukon ===
- Men's Team: No men's team declared
- Women's Team: Bayly Scoffin (Whitehorse)
