= 2026 Ocean Contractors Men's Curling Championship =

Canadian provincial men's curling championship

- Host city: Halifax, Nova Scotia
- Arena: Halifax Curling Club
- Dates: January 6–11
- Winner: Team Thompson
- Curling club: Halifax CC, Halifax
- Skip: Kendal Thompson
- Third: Stuart Thompson
- Second: Bryce Everist
- Lead: Michael Brophy
- Coach: Chris Jeffrey
- Finalist: Owen Purcell

The 2026 Ocean Contractors Men's Curling Championship, the provincial men's curling championship for Nova Scotia, was held from January 6 to 11 at the Halifax Curling Club in Halifax, Nova Scotia. The winning Kendal Thompson rink will represent Nova Scotia at the 2026 Montana's Brier in St. John's, Newfoundland and Labrador. The event was held in conjunction with the 2026 Ocean Contractors Women's Curling Championship, the provincial women's championship.

== Teams ==
The teams are listed as follows:

Skip	Third	Second	Lead	Alternate	Coach	Club
Zach Atherton	Alan Fawcett	Tyler McMullen	Jed Freeman	Owen McPherson	Joel Krats	Halifax CC, Halifax
Nick Deagle	Travis Stone	Jason van Vonderen	Mark MacNamara	Rob Phillips		Sydney CC, Sydney
Sebastien LeFort	Todd Mercer	Michael Garden	Nolan Drover	Devin George		Sydney CC, Sydney
Brent MacDougall	Paul Dexter	Kerry MacLean	Robby McLean	Marty Gavin		Mayflower CC, Timberlea
Matthew Manuel	Cameron MacKenzie	Jeffrey Meagher	Nick Zachernuk		Kevin Patterson	Halifax CC, Halifax
Owen Purcell	Luke Saunders	Gavin Lydiate	Ryan Abraham		Helen Radford	Halifax CC, Halifax
Kendal Thompson	Stuart Thompson	Bryce Everist	Michael Brophy		Chris Jeffrey	Halifax CC, Halifax
Graeme Weagle	Scott Weagle	Caelan McPherson	David McCurdy		Glen MacLeod	Halifax CC, Halifax

== Round robin standings ==
Final Round Robin Standings

Key
Teams to Playoffs

Skip	W	L	W–L	PF	PA	EW	EL	BE	SE
Owen Purcell	6	1	1–0	62	35	31	24	3	7
Kendal Thompson	6	1	0–1	48	28	27	19	3	13
Graeme Weagle	4	3	1–0	47	43	30	28	2	9
Matthew Manuel	4	3	0–1	51	44	28	28	4	6
Zach Atherton	3	4	1–0	44	45	26	24	1	8
Nick Deagle	3	4	0–1	41	50	23	31	2	4
Brent MacDougall	2	5	–	36	58	24	30	2	4
Sebastien LeFort	0	7	–	41	67	27	32	2	8

== Round robin results ==
All draw times listed in Atlantic Time (UTC−04:00).

=== Draw 1 ===
Tuesday, January 6, 2:00 pm

Sheet 1	1	2	3	4	5	6	7	8	9	10	Final
Graeme Weagle	1	1	0	0	1	0	0	1	1	0	5
Nick Deagle	0	0	3	1	0	0	2	0	0	1	7

Sheet 8	1	2	3	4	5	6	7	8	9	10	Final
Zach Atherton	0	0	2	0	1	1	0	1	0	X	5
Kendal Thompson	0	1	0	3	0	0	3	0	0	X	7

Sheet 2	1	2	3	4	5	6	7	8	9	10	Final
Sebastien LeFort	2	1	1	0	2	0	2	0	2	0	10
Owen Purcell	0	0	0	2	0	3	0	3	0	3	11

Sheet 4	1	2	3	4	5	6	7	8	9	10	Final
Matthew Manuel	1	0	0	4	4	X	X	X	X	X	9
Brent MacDougall	0	1	0	0	0	X	X	X	X	X	1

=== Draw 3 ===
Wednesday, January 7, 8:00 am

Sheet 1	1	2	3	4	5	6	7	8	9	10	Final
Zach Atherton	0	1	0	0	1	X	X	X	X	X	2
Owen Purcell	2	0	3	3	0	X	X	X	X	X	8

Sheet 8	1	2	3	4	5	6	7	8	9	10	Final
Graeme Weagle	1	0	0	1	1	0	1	1	0	1	6
Brent MacDougall	0	1	1	0	0	1	0	0	2	0	5

Sheet 2	1	2	3	4	5	6	7	8	9	10	Final
Matthew Manuel	2	0	2	1	0	1	0	2	0	1	9
Nick Deagle	0	3	0	0	1	0	2	0	2	0	8

Sheet 4	1	2	3	4	5	6	7	8	9	10	Final
Sebastien LeFort	0	0	1	0	0	X	X	X	X	X	1
Kendal Thompson	2	3	0	3	1	X	X	X	X	X	9

=== Draw 5 ===
Wednesday, January 7, 4:00 pm

Sheet 1	1	2	3	4	5	6	7	8	9	10	11	Final
Matthew Manuel	0	3	0	0	2	0	2	0	0	0	1	8
Sebastien LeFort	1	0	1	0	0	1	0	2	1	1	0	7

Sheet 8	1	2	3	4	5	6	7	8	9	10	Final
Nick Deagle	0	1	0	0	0	1	0	0	X	X	2
Owen Purcell	1	0	0	1	2	0	1	2	X	X	7

Sheet 2	1	2	3	4	5	6	7	8	9	10	Final
Brent MacDougall	0	2	0	1	0	0	2	1	0	0	6
Kendal Thompson	0	0	3	0	0	2	0	0	2	1	8

Sheet 4	1	2	3	4	5	6	7	8	9	10	Final
Graeme Weagle	2	2	1	0	2	0	1	0	X	X	8
Zach Atherton	0	0	0	1	0	2	0	1	X	X	4

=== Draw 7 ===
Thursday, January 8, 9:00 am

Sheet 1	1	2	3	4	5	6	7	8	9	10	Final
Owen Purcell	2	0	2	0	3	0	2	X	X	X	9
Kendal Thompson	0	1	0	1	0	1	0	X	X	X	3

Sheet 8	1	2	3	4	5	6	7	8	9	10	Final
Matthew Manuel	0	2	0	1	2	0	0	2	0	X	7
Graeme Weagle	1	0	2	0	0	2	2	0	3	X	10

Sheet 2	1	2	3	4	5	6	7	8	9	10	Final
Zach Atherton	1	1	0	2	0	1	3	0	2	X	10
Sebastien LeFort	0	0	2	0	2	0	0	3	0	X	7

Sheet 4	1	2	3	4	5	6	7	8	9	10	Final
Brent MacDougall	1	0	0	0	2	0	1	0	X	X	4
Nick Deagle	0	0	3	3	0	1	0	4	X	X	11

=== Draw 9 ===
Thursday, January 8, 7:00 pm

Sheet 1	1	2	3	4	5	6	7	8	9	10	Final
Sebastien LeFort	0	0	2	0	2	0	1	0	0	X	5
Graeme Weagle	0	1	0	2	0	2	0	2	6	X	13

Sheet 8	1	2	3	4	5	6	7	8	9	10	Final
Kendal Thompson	0	2	2	4	0	X	X	X	X	X	8
Nick Deagle	1	0	0	0	1	X	X	X	X	X	2

Sheet 2	1	2	3	4	5	6	7	8	9	10	Final
Owen Purcell	0	2	1	0	3	0	1	0	2	0	9
Brent MacDougall	2	0	0	3	0	1	0	1	0	3	10

Sheet 4	1	2	3	4	5	6	7	8	9	10	Final
Zach Atherton	0	0	1	0	1	0	0	X	X	X	2
Matthew Manuel	2	1	0	1	0	3	3	X	X	X	10

=== Draw 11 ===
Friday, January 9, 2:00 pm

Sheet 1	1	2	3	4	5	6	7	8	9	10	Final
Kendal Thompson	2	0	0	0	2	1	0	1	0	1	7
Matthew Manuel	0	1	0	1	0	0	2	0	0	0	4

Sheet 8	1	2	3	4	5	6	7	8	9	10	11	Final
Brent MacDougall	0	1	0	0	1	0	3	0	0	2	1	8
Sebastien LeFort	0	0	3	0	0	1	0	2	1	0	0	7

Sheet 2	1	2	3	4	5	6	7	8	9	10	Final
Nick Deagle	0	1	0	1	1	0	0	0	X	X	3
Zach Atherton	1	0	2	0	0	2	3	5	X	X	13

Sheet 4	1	2	3	4	5	6	7	8	9	10	Final
Owen Purcell	0	2	0	0	1	0	1	0	3	2	9
Graeme Weagle	0	0	1	0	0	1	0	2	0	0	4

=== Draw 13 ===
Saturday, January 10, 9:00 am

Sheet 1	1	2	3	4	5	6	7	8	9	10	Final
Brent MacDougall	0	0	1	0	1	0	X	X	X	X	2
Zach Atherton	1	2	0	4	0	1	X	X	X	X	8

Sheet 8	1	2	3	4	5	6	7	8	9	10	Final
Owen Purcell	0	0	3	0	3	0	1	1	1	X	9
Matthew Manuel	0	2	0	1	0	1	0	0	0	X	4

Sheet 2	1	2	3	4	5	6	7	8	9	10	Final
Kendal Thompson	1	1	1	0	0	2	1	X	X	X	6
Graeme Weagle	0	0	0	0	1	0	0	X	X	X	1

Sheet 4	1	2	3	4	5	6	7	8	9	10	Final
Nick Deagle	2	2	0	0	3	0	0	0	1	X	8
Sebastien LeFort	0	0	1	1	0	0	1	1	0	X	4

== Playoffs ==
Semifinal			Final
			1	Owen Purcell	7
2	Kendal Thompson	8	2	Kendal Thompson	9
3	Graeme Weagle	5

=== Semifinal ===
Saturday, January 10, 7:00 pm

Sheet 2	1	2	3	4	5	6	7	8	9	10	Final
Kendal Thompson	0	0	3	2	0	2	0	0	1	X	8
Graeme Weagle	0	1	0	0	1	0	2	1	0	X	5

=== Final ===
Sunday, January 11, 10:00 am

Sheet 2	1	2	3	4	5	6	7	8	9	10	Final
Owen Purcell	0	1	2	1	0	2	0	1	0	X	7
Kendal Thompson	2	0	0	0	1	0	2	0	4	X	9

2026 Ocean Contractors Men's Curling Championship

Kendal Thompson
1st Nova Scotia Provincial Championship title
