= Scott Howard =

Canadian curler (born 1990)

- Curler
- Born: July 11, 1990 (age 36); Midland, Ontario, Canada

Team
- Curling club: Penetanguishene CC, Penetanguishene, ON
- Skip: Scott Howard
- Third: David Mathers
- Second: Pat Janssen
- Lead: Scott Chadwick

Curling career
- Member Association: Ontario
- Brier: 9 (2011, 2012, 2013, 2015, 2016, 2017, 2021, 2022, 2024)
- World Championship: 1 (2012)
- Top CTRS ranking: 6th (2018-19, 2021–22)
Medal record
Representing Canada
Men's curling
World Curling Championships
Gold medal – first place	2012 Basel
Representing Ontario
Tim Hortons Brier
Gold medal – first place	2012 Saskatoon
Silver medal – second place	2011 London

Scott William Howard (born July 11, 1990) is a Canadian curler from Tiny, Ontario. He currently skips his own team out of Navan, Ontario.

== Career ==
In his early men's career, Howard would often be an alternate for his father, Canadian Curling Hall of Famer, Glenn Howard. As the team's alternate, Scott Howard notably won the 2012 Tim Hortons Brier and the 2012 World Men's Curling Championship. While being the alternate for his father's team, Scott would also curl on the John Epping rink at second for two seasons (2011–2013), where they won the 2012 Players' Championship Grand Slam event.

Scott would start to curl as the lead on his fathers team during the 2015–16 curling season, alongside veteran curlers Wayne Middaugh at third, and Richard Hart at second. Middaugh left the team mid-season following a skiing incident and was replaced by Adam Spencer, who played second on the team with Hart back at third. The team won the 2016 Ontario Tankard provincial championship, losing just the 1 vs. 2 game, where they were downed by John Epping. They beat Epping in the final, and went on to represent Ontario at the 2016 Tim Hortons Brier. At the Brier, Team Howard finished with a 4–7 round robin record.

During the 2016 off season, David Mathers, a former teammate of Scott's from his time with Epping, joined the team at second, with Middaugh unable to commit to the season following his injury, and Hart moved to third. The rink went 6–3 through the round robin at the 2017 Ontario Tankard, and then won both playoff games to win Howard's record 17th provincial championship. They beat Wayne Tuck Jr. in the final. At the 2017 Tim Hortons Brier, Team Howard would again finish with a 4–7 record. In 2017, Hart was not able to play for the team following a knee injury, and was replaced by Adam Spencer. The rink played in the 2017 Olympic Pre-Trials. They went 6–0 in round robin play, but were eliminated in the playoffs, making it as far as the "B" final, ending the team's Olympic qualifying run. At the 2018 Ontario Tankard, the team went undefeated until the final, where they lost to Epping. During the offseason, Tim March who had been playing for Team Epping, joined the Howard rink at lead for the 2018–19 curling season, with Scott replacing Spencer at third. The new lineup proved unsuccessful at their first Ontario Tankard in 2019. After going 7–2 in the round robin, and beating Alberta-transplant Charley Thomas in the 3 vs. 4 game, they lost to Epping in the semifinal. The next year, the team went 6–2 at the 2020 Ontario Tankard. They beat the defending champion Scott McDonald rink in the semifinal, but lost to Epping again in the final.

There was no provincial championship in 2021 due to the COVID-19 pandemic in Ontario, and Team Epping were invited to represent the province at the 2021 Tim Hortons Brier. Due to the pandemic, the Brier was expanded by two teams, and the Howard rink qualified as Wild Card #3 based on their CTRS ranking. Unfortunately, Glenn Howard suffered a snowmobile accident that winter, breaking several ribs in the process, and so the team invited Wayne Middaugh to come out of retirement to skip the team. At the Brier, the team led by Middaugh finished round-robin play with an 8–4 record, just missing the three-team playoff.

Team Howard would start the 2021–22 curling season as Glenn Howard's last attempt to represent Canada at the Olympics. Team Howard would play in the 2021 Canadian Olympic Curling Pre-Trials where the team went 5–1 in pool play, but were knocked out in their final playoff game against Tanner Horgan, who qualified for the Trials with the win. Lingering knee pain kept Glenn Howard out of the 2022 Ontario Tankard, and Scott would begin skipping the new Team Howard, bringing back Adam Spencer to throw third stones. The Glenn-less team won the Tankard, qualifying the rink for the 2022 Tim Hortons Brier. However, Glenn's knee recovered in time for the 2022 Tim Hortons Brier, where the team finished with a 4–4 record. At the 2023 Ontario Tankard, the Howard rink went undefeated in pool play and in the championship round, only to lose in the final to famous Manitoban curler Mike McEwen, who skipped a team out of Toronto for the season.

In December 2023, while playing in the Nufloors Penticton Curling Classic, Glenn Howard's knee "seized up" after playing in four games. His injury forced him to miss the rest of the tournament, in which Scott skipped the three-man team to win the event. Glenn would not play in any games for the rest of the season, and Scott would again start skipping the new team, where the three-man team won the 2024 Ontario Tankard. At the 2024 Montana's Brier, the team brought in Mathew Camm to throw second stones, with Mathers throwing third stones. Scott led the team to a 3–5 record. Following the season, Glenn Howard officially announced his retirement from competitive curling. However, Glenn would continue to coach the new Team Howard, as Scott would skip a new team for the 2024–25 curling season, alongside Mathew Camm, Camm's brother Jason, and March continuing to throwing lead. In their first season together, the team would have a strong season, finishing second at the Nufloors Penticton Curling Classic, and the Martensville International. However, at the 2025 Ontario Tankard, Howard would be unable to repeat his provincial tankard title, losing in the final 7–4 to Sam Mooibroek. At the end of the season, Team Howard would announce that longtime lead Tim March would be retiring, with Scott Chadwick joining the team for the upcoming season.

Team Howard would start the 2025–26 curling season at the 2025 Canadian Olympic Curling Pre-Trials. At the Pre-Trials, the team would have a strong showing but finish in third place, losing 5–4 in the semifinals to Jordon McDonald and failing to qualify for the official Trials.

== Personal life ==
Howard attended Penetanguishene Secondary School and Georgian College. He currently works as an estimator/contract manager at Maacon Construction. He lives in Tiny, Ontario. He is in a relationship with Kelly Stewart, and has two children.

== Teams ==
Season	Skip	Third	Second	Lead
2010–11	Wayne Middaugh	Joe Frans	Scott Howard	Scott Foster
2011–12	John Epping	Scott Bailey	Scott Howard	David Mathers
2012–13	John Epping	Scott Bailey	Scott Howard	David Mathers
2013–14	Rob Rumfeldt	Adam Spencer	Scott Howard	Scott Hodgson
2014–15	Mark Kean	Mat Camm	David Mathers	Scott Howard
2015–16	Glenn Howard	Wayne Middaugh (Note: Wayne Middaugh was injured and unable to play in the 2016 Ontario Provincial Championships and Brier. He was replaced by Adam Spencer at second, moving Hart up to third.)	Richard Hart	Scott Howard
2016–17	Glenn Howard	Richard Hart	David Mathers	Scott Howard
2017–18	Glenn Howard	Richard Hart	David Mathers	Scott Howard
2018–19	Glenn Howard	Scott Howard	David Mathers	Tim March
2019–20	Glenn Howard	Scott Howard	David Mathers	Tim March
2020–21	Glenn Howard	Scott Howard	David Mathers	Tim March
2021–22	Glenn Howard	Scott Howard	David Mathers	Tim March
2022–23	Glenn Howard	Scott Howard	David Mathers	Tim March
2023–24	Glenn Howard	Scott Howard	David Mathers	Tim March
2024–25	Scott Howard	Mat Camm	Jason Camm	Tim March
2025–26	Scott Howard	Mat Camm	Jason Camm	Scott Chadwick
2026–27	Scott Howard	David Mathers	Pat Janssen	Scott Chadwick
