= Jason Camm =

Canadian curler

- Curler
- Born: November 3, 1994 (age 32); Rockland, Ontario

Team
- Curling club: Navan CC, Navan, ON
- Skip: Jason Camm
- Third: Sam Wills
- Second: Wyatt Small
- Lead: Nathan Steele

Curling career
- Member Association: Ontario (2010–2018; 2019–present); Quebec (2018–19)
- Top CTRS ranking: 10th (2023–24)

Jason Camm (born November 3, 1994) is a Canadian curler from Rockland, Ontario. He currently skips his own team.

== Career ==
=== Juniors ===
In 2011, Camm won both the Ontario Bantam Boys Championship and the Ontario Bantam Mixed Championship, both as a skip.

After Bantams, Camm formed a junior team with Aaron Squires as skip, and Camm throwing last rocks. The team won the 2013 Ontario Junior Championships and earned the right to represent the province at the 2013 Canadian Junior Curling Championships. The team finished the event with a 7-3 record, tied with Manitoba's Matt Dunstone in third place. The two teams played in each other in a tiebreaker for a playoff spot, with Camm and Team Ontario losing 11-8.

In the middle of his junior career, Camm joined the Bryan Cochrane rink playing third, and played in his first provincial championships, the 2014 Travelers Tankard. After the team posted a 6-4 round robin record, they beat Jake Walker in the 3 vs. 4 game, before losing in the semifinal to Mark Bice.

In 2015, Camm joined the Doug Kee junior rink at third and won another Ontario Junior Championship in 2016. Representing Ontario at the 2016 Canadian Junior Curling Championships, the team finished with a 5-5 record, missing the playoffs.

=== Men's ===
After juniors, Camm began playing on the World Curling Tour. He played second for Pat Ferris for the 2016-17 season, third for Mike McLean in the 2017-18 season and second Martin Ferland in 2018-19, before skipping his own team in 2019.

The McLean rink qualified for the 2018 Ontario Tankard. The team lost all three games in the triple knockout event.

While with Ferland, Camm curled out of Quebec and played in the 2019 WFG Tankard, the Quebec men's provincial championship. There, the team finished with a 4-5 record, missing the playoffs.

Skipping his own rink of Jordie Lyon-Hather, Kurt Armstron and Brett Lyon-Hatcher, Camm won the Mooshead Classic Open event. His team also qualified for the 2020 Ontario Tankard, where they finished with a 2–6 record.

For the 2021–22 curling season, Camm teamed up with Matthew Hall, Cameron Goodkey and Jordie Lyon-Hather. Following the cancellation of the open qualifier for the 2022 Ontario Tankard due to the COVID-19 pandemic in Ontario, the team was invited to play in the event. There, the team made it through the qualifying round with a 5–2 record, making it to the playoffs. In the playoffs, the team beat Sam Mooibroek before losing in the semifinal to John Epping.

The next season, Camm formed a new team with Ian Dickie, Zack Shurtleff and Punit Sthankiya. The team won two tour events, the Capital Curling Fall Open and the Capital Curling Classic. Their success on the tour qualified them for the 2023 Ontario Tankard, where they finished with a 2–3 record.

At the beginning of the 2024–25 curling season, Camm would join Scott Howard's rink alongside Camm's brother Mathew, and Tim March. In their first season together, the team would do well, finishing second at the Nufloors Penticton Curling Classic, and the Martensville International. However, at the 2025 Ontario Tankard, Howard would be unable to repeat his provincial tankard title, losing in the final 7–4 to Sam Mooibroek. At the end of the season, Team Howard would announce that March would be retiring, with Scott Chadwick joining the team for the upcoming season. Team Howard would start the 2025–26 curling season at the 2025 Canadian Olympic Curling Pre-Trials. At the Pre-Trials, the team would have a strong showing but finish in third place, losing 5–4 in the semifinals to Jordon McDonald and failing to qualify for the official Trials.

== Personal life ==
Camm's brother Mat is also a curler.

Camm married his long time girlfriend in June 2024.

He owns Cammstruction Parging and Resurfacing.
