= Landan Rooney =

Canadian curler

- Curler
- Born: February 19, 2002 (age 24); Toronto, Ontario, Canada

Team
- Curling club: Dixie Curling Club, Mississauga, ON
- Skip: Jordan Chandler
- Third: Landan Rooney
- Second: Connor Lawes
- Lead: Nathan Kim

Curling career
- Member Association: Ontario (2019–2026); Northern Ontario (2026–present)
- Top CTRS ranking: 20th (2021–22)

Landan Rooney (born February 19, 2002) is a Canadian curler from Mississauga, Ontario. He currently plays third on Team Jordan Chandler.

== Career ==
Rooney and teammates Matthew Prenevost, Kevin Genjaga, Benjamin Lobo competed in the 2019 Ontario U-21 Curling Championships, finishing with a 3–4 record. The following year, Rooney with new teammates Gavin Lydiate, Christopher Oka and Riley Fung-Ernst returned to the Ontario U-21, finishing with a 4–3 record.

Rooney competed in the 2021 World Junior Qualification Event, playing third for Scott Mitchell. The event was held as a replacement tournament for the Canadian Junior Curling Championships, which were cancelled due to the COVID-19 pandemic in Canada. The team finished with a 4–2 record, losing in the semifinals. Rooney played in his first Provincial men's championship in 2022, playing third for Mitchell. The team was eliminated at the event after finishing with a 3–3 record.

Rooney and his rink of Nathan Steele, Jacob Jones and Austin Snyder won the 2022 Canadian Junior Curling Championships, defeating Alberta's Johnson Tao in the final. The team had just formed in December 2021 prior to that season's Ontario U-21 Curling Championships. They finished the Canadian Juniors Round-Robin with a 7–1 record, and then won all three of their playoff games to win the Championships. As Canadian champions, the team represented Canada at the 2023 World Junior Curling Championships, where they finished with a 3–6 record, relegating Canada to the "B" championship for 2024.

As national junior champions, Rooney and his rink (with Mitchell playing third instead of Steele) were invited to compete in the inaugural 2022 PointsBet Invitational tournament put on by Curling Canada. The team lost in the first round of the single-elimination tournament to Brendan Bottcher, 11–3. Later that season Rooney, and his team of Connor Deane, Jones and Snyder qualified for the 2023 Ontario Tankard by defeating Mike McEwen in one of the A finals of the Tankard Open Qualifier. At the Ontario Tankard, the team went 1–4 in pool play, missing the playoffs.

== Personal life ==
He currently plays for the University of Toronto men's curling team. He is currently a humanities student there.
