= Mathew Camm =

Canadian curler from Cornwall, Ontario

- Curler
- Born: March 29, 1990 (age 36); Ottawa, Ontario

Team
- Curling club: Leaside CC, East York, Toronto, ON

Curling career
- Member Association: Ontario
- Brier: 5 (2015, 2018, 2020, 2021, 2024)
- Top CTRS ranking: 2nd (2019–20)
- Grand Slam victories: 2 (2015 Canadian Open, 2018 Masters)
Medal record
Men's curling
Representing Canada
World Junior Curling Championships
Bronze medal – third place	2010 Flims
Representing Ontario
Tim Hortons Brier
Bronze medal – third place	2018 Regina
Canada Winter Games
Silver medal – second place	2007 Whitehorse

Mathew Robert "Mat" Camm (born March 29, 1990) is a Canadian curler from Cornwall, Ontario. Camm is originally from Rockland, Ontario.

== Career ==
=== Juniors ===
In 2007, Camm played second for the Neil Sinclair rink which won the Ontario Bantam boy's championship. The team also won the silver medal at the Canada Winter Games that year.

In 2010, Camm lost in the final of the Pepsi Ontario Junior Curling Championships to Jake Walker. When Walker went on to win the Canadian Junior Curling Championships that year, he selected Camm to play as the team's alternate at the 2010 World Junior Curling Championships, where the team won bronze medals.

Camm had an even more successful 2010–11 season. In 2010, his junior team won the Ontario Curling Tour championship. This gave the team a lot of CTRS points helping them to qualify for the 2010 Canada Cup of Curling. However, they were helped out by many higher ranked teams choosing not to participate. At the Canada Cup, the team went 0–5, finishing last in a pool which was won by Olympic champion Kevin Martin.

In January 2011, the Camm rink won the Pepsi Ontario Junior Curling Championships, his only junior provincial championship. He represented Ontario at the 2011 Canadian Junior Curling Championships. The Camm rink finished second in the round robin with a 9–3 record. After winning their semifinal game against Newfoundland and Labrador, Camm would have to face Saskatchewan's Braeden Moskowy in the final. The teams were tied 7–7 after ten ends, and Moskowy had to make a difficult nose-hit to defeat Camm on his final shot, which had to be measured.

=== Men's ===
Following his graduation for the junior ranks after the 2010–11 season, Camm played in his first men's provincial championship, playing third for Chris Gardner at the 2012 Dominion Tankard. The team finished in seventh place, with a 4–6 record. In 2012, Camm joined the Bryan Cochrane-skipped rink, throwing third stones for the team. Camm made his second provincial championship that season, with the Cochrane rink finishing with a 4–6 record at the 2013 The Dominion Tankard. The following season, Camm moved to throwing fourth stones on the team (Cochrane, while skipping, continued to throw lead stones). The team played in the 2013 Canadian Olympic Trials pre-qualifying event, but lost all three of their games. The team played in the 2014 provincial championship, this time making the playoffs, where they lost in the semifinal.

In 2014, Camm joined the Mark Kean rink at the third position. Team Kean finished first overall (8–2 record) at the Recharge with Milk 2015 Ontario provincial championships. After losing the 1 vs. 2 page game against John Epping, the team rebounded with a semifinal victory against the Peter Corner rink which had Wayne Middaugh throwing last rocks. In an exciting rematch final against Epping the Kean rink narrowly edged their opponents 7–6 to win their first Ontario Championships. Camm represented the province of Ontario playing third for Team Kean at the 2015 Tim Hortons Brier in Calgary, Alberta, finishing with a 5–6 record.

In 2015, Camm joined the Epping team along with Pat Janssen and Tim March. Team Epping would play in seven Grand Slam events, winning the 2015 Meridian Canadian Open, the team's first Slam title. In the other slams, the team made lost in the finals of the 2016 Humpty's Champions Cup, made it to the semifinals of the 2015 National, the quarterfinals of the 2016 Elite 10, while the team missed the playoffs at the 2015 GSOC Tour Challenge, 2015 Masters of Curling, 2016 Players' Championship. They also finished third at the 2015 Canada Cup, losing to Kevin Koe in the semifinal. At the 2016 Ontario Tankard, the team made it to the final where they lost to Team Glenn Howard. That season, the team also won the 2016 US Open of Curling.

In the 2016–17 season, the Epping rink again played in all seven slams, making it to the semifinals of the 2017 Humpty's Champions Cup, the quarterfinals of the 2016 WFG Masters and the 2016 Boost National, and missed the playoffs at the 2016 GSOC Tour Challenge, 2017 Meridian Canadian Open, the 2017 Elite 10 and the 2017 Players' Championship. Elsewhere on the tour, the team won the 2016 CookstownCash presented by Comco Canada Inc. and the 2016 Challenge de Curling de Gatineau. At the 2016 Canada Cup of Curling, the team again lost in the semifinal. At the 2017 Ontario Tankard, the team lost in the semifinal against Wayne Tuck Jr.

The team qualified for the 2017 Canadian Olympic Curling Trials, finishing in last place in the nine-team field, with a 2–6 record. In 2018, the team won the Ontario Tankard, making it to the 2018 Tim Hortons Brier. They finished the round robin in second place with a 9–2 record, earning themselves a spot in the 1 vs. 2 page playoff game against Team Canada. They would go on to lose that game 6–2, dropping down to the semifinal game against Team Alberta skipped by Brendan Bottcher. They would lose that game 6–4, earning themselves a bronze medal.

Beginning with the 2018–19 season, Janssen and March left Team Epping and were replaced with veteran curlers Craig Savill and Brent Laing, with Camm remaining as the team's third. The team won the 2018 Masters that season, and finished 3–3 at the 2018 Canada Cup. At the 2019 Ontario Tankard, they lost in the final to Team Scott McDonald, but qualified for the 2019 Tim Hortons Brier Wild Card game. In the Wild Card game, the team lost to the Brendan Bottcher rink, ending their Brier run that season.

Ryan Fry joined the Epping team at third for the 2019–20 season, with Camm and Laing moving to second and lead and Savill leaving the team. They had a strong start to the year, winning both the Stu Sells Oakville Tankard and the 2019 AMJ Campbell Shorty Jenkins Classic. They had a semifinal finish at the Masters, the first Grand Slam of the season. They missed the playoffs at the next two slams, the Tour Challenge and the National after going 1–3 at both. Team Epping posted a 6–2 record en route to winning the 2019 Canada Cup in Leduc, Alberta. This win qualified them to represent Team Canada along with five other Canadian teams at the 2020 Continental Cup where they lost 22.5–37.5 to the Europeans. They had a strong showing at the Canadian Open where they made it all the way to the final where they lost to the Brad Jacobs rink. At the 2020 Ontario Tankard, they completed their undefeated run throughout the week with an 8–3 win over Glenn Howard. Representing Ontario at the 2020 Tim Hortons Brier, they finished the championship pool with a 7–4 record and in a four-way tie for fourth place. They defeated Team Wild Card (Mike McEwen) in the first tiebreaker before losing to Northern Ontario (Brad Jacobs) in the second and being eliminated from contention. It would be the team's last event of the season as both the Players' Championship and the Champions Cup Grand Slam events were cancelled due to the COVID-19 pandemic.

Team Epping began the 2020–21 season with a win at the 2020 Stu Sells Toronto Tankard, which Camm did not participate in. The 2021 Ontario provincial playdowns were cancelled due to the COVID-19 pandemic in Ontario. As the 2020 provincial champions, Team Epping was chosen to represent Ontario at the 2021 Tim Hortons Brier in Calgary. At the Brier, they finished with a 7–5 record.

Epping would lose in the 2024 Ontario Tankard semifinals to Jayden King, however, as winners Team Howard were without skip Glenn Howard for the 2024 Montana's Brier Camm was chosen by Scott Howard to join the team to throw second stones. That year, they would finish with a 3–5 record. Following the season, Glenn Howard officially announced his retirement from competitive curling, and Scott Howard would skip a new Team Howard alongside Camm as third, Camm's brother Jason, and Tim March. In their first season together, the team would do well, finishing second at the Nufloors Penticton Curling Classic, and the Martensville International. However, at the 2025 Ontario Tankard, Howard would be unable to repeat his provincial tankard title, losing in the final 7–4 to Sam Mooibroek. At the end of the season, Team Howard would announce that March would be retiring, with Scott Chadwick joining the team for the upcoming season.

Team Howard would start the 2025–26 curling season at the 2025 Canadian Olympic Curling Pre-Trials. At the Pre-Trials, the team would have a strong showing but finish in third place, losing 5–4 in the semifinals to Jordon McDonald and failing to qualify for the official Trials. After Howard finished a disappointing 4th at the 2026 Ontario Tankard, Camm announced his retirement at the end of the season.

== Personal life ==
Camm is a partner with Camm & Jones Residential Improvements and Lost Villages Brewery. He is married and has two daughters. His brother Jason plays second on his team.

== Teams ==
Season	Skip	Third	Second	Lead
2006–07	Neil Sinclair	Graham Rathwell	Mat Camm	Andrew Hamilton
2007–08	Neil Sinclair	Graham Rathwell	Mat Camm	Andrew Hamilton
2009–10	Ed Cyr	Mat Camm	David Mathers	Andrew Hamilton
2010–11	Mat Camm	David Mathers	Scott Howard	Andrew Hamilton
2011–12	Chris Gardner	Mat Camm	Brad Kidd	Doug Johnston
2012–13	Chris Gardner (Fourth)	Mat Camm	Brad Kidd	Bryan Cochrane (Skip)
2013–14	Mat Camm (Fourth)	Chris Gardner	Brad Kidd	Bryan Cochrane (Skip)
2014–15	Mark Kean	Mat Camm	David Mathers	Scott Howard
2015–16	John Epping	Mat Camm	Pat Janssen	Tim March
2016–17	John Epping	Mat Camm	Pat Janssen	Tim March
2017–18	John Epping	Mat Camm	Pat Janssen	Tim March
2018–19	John Epping	Mat Camm	Brent Laing	Craig Savill
2019–20	John Epping	Ryan Fry	Mat Camm	Brent Laing
2020–21	John Epping	Ryan Fry	Mat Camm	Brent Laing
2021–22	John Epping	Ryan Fry	Mat Camm	Brent Laing
2022–23	John Epping	Mat Camm	Pat Janssen	Scott Chadwick
2023–24	John Epping	Mat Camm	Pat Janssen	Jason Camm
2024–25	Scott Howard	Mat Camm	Jason Camm	Tim March
2025–26	Scott Howard	Mat Camm	Jason Camm	Scott Chadwick
