= Tim March =

Canadian curler

- Curler
- Born: April 28, 1987 (age 39); Toronto, Ontario

Team
- Curling club: Leaside CC, East York, Toronto, ON

Curling career
- Member Association: Ontario
- Brier: 4 (2018, 2021, 2022, 2024)
- Top CTRS ranking: 5th (2015–16; 2016–17)
- Grand Slam victories: 1 (2015 Canadian Open)
Medal record
Men's curling
Representing Ontario
Tim Hortons Brier
Bronze medal – third place	2018 Regina

Timothy March (born April 28, 1987) is a retired Canadian curler from Scarborough, Ontario.

== Career ==
=== Youth ===
March skipped his high school team from Sir Oliver Mowat Collegiate Institute to a provincial Schoolboy championship in 2005.

=== Men's ===
March played third on the Annandale Country Club team that were runners up at the 2010 The Dominion Curling Club Championship. The team had won the provincial curling club championship that year.

March joined the Mark Kean rink in 2010, playing lead on the team. In 2011, the team played in their first Grand Slam event, the January 2011 Canadian Open. The team finished the event with an 0–5 record. Also that season, the team made it to their first provincial championship, the 2011 Dominion Tankard. There, the team finished with a 6–4 record, missing the playoffs.

In the 2011–12 season, the Kean rink played in two slams, the 2011 World Cup of Curling (0-5 record) and the December 2011 Canadian Open (1-4 record). The team played in the 2012 Dominion Tankard, missing the playoffs with a 3–7 record.

In the 2012–13 season, Team Kean had a better season on Tour, winning the 2012 KW Fall Classic and playing in four slams. They played in the 2012 Masters of Curling (0-5 record), the 2012 Canadian Open of Curling (semifinalists), the 2013 National (1-4 record) and the 2013 Players' Championship (0-4). The team did not qualify for the men's provincial championship that season.

The rink played in the 2013 Canadian Olympic Curling Pre-Trials, finishing with a 1–3 record, and not qualifying for the Olympic Trials. They then played in the 2013 Canadian Open of Curling, losing in the quarterfinals. The team disbanded mid-season, but March would play in two more Slams that year, playing lead for Travis Fanset at the March 2014 National going 0-5 and playing lead for John Epping at the 2014 Players' Championship, losing in the quarterfinals.

The next season, March remained on the Epping rink. Early on in the season, they won the 2014 Village of Taunton Mills Gord Carroll Curling Classic. They played in five slams that season, making it to the semifinals of the 2014 Masters and 2015 Players' Championship, while missing the playoffs at the November 2014 National, the 2014 Canadian Open of Curling and the 2015 Elite 10. The team played in the 2015 Ontario Tankard (men's provincials), making it to the final before losing to March's former skip, Mark Kean.

In the 2015–16 season, Team Epping would play in seven Grand Slam events, winning the 2015 Meridian Canadian Open, the team's first Slam title. In the other slams, the team made lost in the finals of the 2016 Humpty's Champions Cup, made it to the semifinals of the 2015 National, the quarterfinals of the 2016 Elite 10, while the team missed the playoffs at the 2015 GSOC Tour Challenge, 2015 Masters of Curling, 2016 Players' Championship. The team also played in the 2015 Canada Cup of Curling, where they made it to the semifinal. At the 2016 Ontario Tankard, the team again made it to the finals, but lost to Team Glenn Howard in the final. That season, the team also won the 2016 US Open of Curling.

In the 2016–17 season, the Epping rink again played in all seven slams, making it to the semifinals of the 2017 Humpty's Champions Cup, the quarterfinals of the 2016 WFG Masters and the 2016 Boost National, and missed the playoffs at the 2016 GSOC Tour Challenge, 2017 Meridian Canadian Open, the 2017 Elite 10 and the 2017 Players' Championship. Elsewhere on the tour, the team won the 2016 CookstownCash presented by Comco Canada Inc. and the 2016 Challenge de Curling de Gatineau. At the 2016 Canada Cup of Curling, the team again lost in the semifinal. At the 2017 Ontario Tankard, the team lost in the semifinal against Wayne Tuck Jr.

The team qualified for the 2017 Canadian Olympic Curling Trials, finishing in last place in the nine-team field, with a 2–6 record. In 2018, the team won the Ontario Tankard, making it to the 2018 Tim Hortons Brier. They finished the round robin in second place with a 9–2 record, earning themselves a spot in the 1 vs. 2 page playoff game against Team Canada. They would go on to lose that game 6–2, dropping down to the semifinal game against Team Alberta skipped by Brendan Bottcher. They would lose that game 6–4, earning themselves a bronze medal.

In the 2018-19 curling season, March left the Epping rink to join the Glenn Howard team. The Howard rink participated in the 2021 Brier as Wild Card Team #3, finishing in 5th place with an 8-4 record. The Howard rink continued their success and won the 2022 Ontario Tankard and represented Ontario at the 2022 Brier, where they finished in 9th place with a 4-4 record.

In December 2023, while playing in the Nufloors Penticton Curling Classic, Glenn Howard's knee "seized up" after playing in four games. His injury forced him to miss the rest of the tournament, in which Scott skipped the three-man team to win the event. Glenn would not play in any games for the rest of the season, and Scott would again start skipping the new team, where the three-man team won the 2024 Ontario Tankard. At the 2024 Montana's Brier, the team brought in Mathew Camm to throw second stones, with Mathers throwing third stones. Scott led the team to a 3–5 record. Following the season, Glenn Howard officially announced his retirement from competitive curling. However, Glenn would continue to coach the new Team Howard, as Scott would skip a new team for the 2024–25 curling season, alongside Mathew Camm, Camm's brother Jason, and March continuing to throwing lead. In their first season together, the team would have a strong season, finishing second at the Nufloors Penticton Curling Classic, and the Martensville International. However, at the 2025 Ontario Tankard, Howard would be unable to repeat his provincial tankard title, losing in the final 7–4 to Sam Mooibroek. At the end of the season, March announced that he would be retiring to focus on his career and family.

== Personal life ==
March works as a chartered professional accountant and as a partner with Murphy & Chung Professional Corporation. He is married to Kim Tune and has one son. He attended Sir Oliver Mowat Collegiate Institute and Ryerson University.
