= Leaside Curling Club =

Curling club in Toronto, Ontario

Coordinates: 43.70161°N 79.36125°W

- Interactive map of Leaside Curling Club
- Location: 1075 Millwood Road; Toronto, Ontario; M4G 1X6
- Arena: Leaside Curling Club

Information
- Established: 1963
- Club type: Dedicated ice
- Curling Canada region: CurlON Zone
- Sheets of ice: 8
- Rock colours: Green and Yellow
- Website: leasidecurling.ca

Leaside Curling Club is a curling club located in the Leaside neighbourhood of Toronto, Ontario, Canada. The organization was founded in 1963 in response to community requests for a neighbourhood curling club. The City of Toronto built the club's facility in the Leaside Memorial Community Gardens recreational complex, which has eight sheets of curling ice, a lounge, pro shop, bar, and change rooms. The curling club and its member-elected Board of Directors managed all aspects of the operation of the club in partnership with the City's Parks and Recreation Department which provided management and maintenance support.

In 2014, the club's membership voted to approve a proposal through which the membership would lease the facility and be responsible for the overall operations and management of the club.

Today, Leaside is Ontario's largest curling club, with more than 1,100 members and leagues for curlers of all ages and abilities. Leaside is also the home club of John Epping, a top-ranked curler on the World Curling Tour. As club pro, Epping can be booked for individual or team instruction.

Club and ice rental are also available to groups for team building or recreational experiences. No experience required; instructors are provided on request.
