= 2019 Cameron's Brewing Oakville Fall Classic =

World Curling Tour event

- Host city: Oakville, Ontario
- Dates: August 30 – September 2
- Men's winner: (Switzerland) Yannick Schwaller
- Curling club: Baden Regio CC, Baden
- Skip: Yannick Schwaller
- Third: Michael Brunner
- Second: Romano Meier
- Lead: Marcel Käufeler
- Finalist: (South Korea) Kim Chang-min
- Women's winner: (Scotland) Eve Muirhead
- Curling club: Dunkeld CC, Pitlochry
- Skip: Eve Muirhead
- Third: Lauren Gray
- Second: Jennifer Dodds
- Lead: Vicky Wright
- Finalist: (Switzerland) Silvana Tirinzoni

The 2019 Cameron's Brewing Oakville Fall Classic was held August 30 to September 2 in Oakville, Ontario. It was the first event of the Ontario Curling Tour for the 2019–20 curling season and the sixth and fifth Men's and Women's events on the World Curling Tour respectively. The total purse for the event was $16,000 on both the Men's and Women's side.

In the Men's event, Yannick Schwaller defeated Kim Chang-min 7–3 in the final and in the Women's event, Eve Muirhead defeated Silvana Tirinzoni 5–2 in the final.

== Men ==
=== Teams ===
The teams are listed as follows:

Skip	Third	Second	Lead	Locale
Rob Ainsley	Dave Ellis	Graeme Robson	Darren Karn	Toronto, Ontario
Todd Birr	Andrew Stopera	Hunter Clawson	Tom O'Connor	(United States) Ham Lake, Minnesota
Cameron Bryce	Craig Waddell	Gregor Cannon	Derrick Sloan	Stirling, Scotland
Jason Camm	Jordie Lyon-Hatcher	Kurt Armstrong	Brett Lyon-Hatcher	Ottawa, Ontario
Korey Dropkin	Thomas Howell	Mark Fenner	Alex Fenson	(United States) Chaska, Minnesota
Scott Dunnam	Alex Leichter	Cody Clouser	Andrew Dunnam	(United States) Philadelphia, Pennsylvania
Pat Ferris	Ian Dickie	Connor Duhaime	Zack Shurtleff	Grimsby, Ontario
Matthew Hall	Alex Champ	Terry Arnold	Scott Clinton	Kitchener, Ontario
Jan Hess	Simon Gloor	Simon Höhn	Reto Schönenberger	Zug, Switzerland
Steve Holdaway	Adam Freilich	Stewart Yaxley	Adam Cartwright	Montreal, Quebec
Jacob Horgan	Scott Mitchell	Mitchell Cortello	Chase Dusessoy	Sudbury, Ontario
Tanner Horgan	Colton Lott	Kyle Doering	Tanner Lott	Winnipeg Beach, Manitoba
Mark Kean	Charlie Richard	Tyler Twining	D. J. Ronaldson	London, Ontario
Kim Chang-min	Lee Ki-jeong	Kim Hak-kyun	Lee Ki-bok	Uiseong, South Korea
Frederic Lawton	Zackary Wise	David Fleury	Charles Gagnon	Montreal, Quebec
Lucien Lottenbach	Rainer Kobler	Patrick Abacherli	Tom Winklehausen	Zug, Switzerland
Yuta Matsumura	Tetsuro Shimizu	Yasumasa Tanida	Shinya Abe	Kitami, Japan
Scott McDonald	Jonathan Beuk	Wesley Forget	Scott Chadwick	Kingston, Ontario
Yusuke Morozumi	Masaki Iwai	Ryotaro Shukuya	Kosuke Morozumi	Nagano, Japan
Kirk Muyres	Kevin Marsh	Dan Marsh	Dallan Muyres	Saskatoon, Saskatchewan
Joël Retornaz	Amos Mosaner	Sebastiano Arman	Simone Gonin	Pinerolo, Italy
Robert Desjardins (Fourth)	Jean-Sébastien Roy (Skip)	Pierre-Luc Morisette	René Dubois	Saguenay, Quebec
Rich Ruohonen	Colin Hufman	Kroy Nernberger	Phil Tilker	(United States) Minneapolis, Minnesota
Yannick Schwaller	Michael Brunner	Romano Meier	Marcel Käufeler	Bern, Switzerland
Sam Steep	Adam Vincent	Oliver Campbell	Thomas Ryan	St. Catharines, Ontario
Wouter Gösgens (Fourth)	Jaap van Dorp	Laurens Hoekman	Carlo Glasbergen	Zoetermeer, Netherlands
John Willsey	Connor Lawes	Robert Currie	Evan Lilly	Waterloo, Ontario
Tsuyoshi Yamaguchi	Riku Yanagisawa	Satoshi Koizumi	Fukuhiro Ohno	Nagano, Japan

=== Round Robin Standings ===
Final Round Robin Standings

Key
Teams to Playoffs

Pool A	W	L	SO
(Scotland) Cameron Bryce	4	0	88.00
(Ontario) Scott McDonald	2	2	116.00
(Ontario) Sam Steep	2	2	127.50
(Ontario) Pat Ferris	1	3	118.00
(Ontario) Matthew Hall	1	3	206.00

Pool B	W	L	SO
(Switzerland) Jan Hess	4	0	40.00
(Japan) Yuta Matsumura	3	1	83.30
(Switzerland) Lucien Lottenbach	2	2	36.00
(Quebec) Steve Holdaway	1	3	112.00
(Japan) Yusuke Morozumi	0	4	7.00

Pool C	W	L	SO
(Italy) Joël Retornaz	4	0	122.00
(Switzerland) Yannick Schwaller	3	1	19.00
(United States) Scott Dunnam	2	2	32.00
(Quebec) Jean-Sébastien Roy	1	3	62.00
(Quebec) Frederic Lawton	0	4	65.00

Pool D	W	L	SO
(Manitoba) Tanner Horgan	4	0	84.00
(Ontario) Jason Camm	2	2	40.00
(Saskatchewan) Kirk Muyres	2	2	48.50
(Ontario) Rob Ainsley	2	2	109.00
(Ontario) Mark Kean	0	4	125.00

Pool E	W	L	SO
(United States) Rich Ruohonen	4	0	53.50
(South Korea) Kim Chang-min	3	1	97.50
(Ontario) John Willsey	1	3	111.00
(Ontario) Jacob Horgan	0	4	270.50

Pool F	W	L	SO
(Japan) Tsuyoshi Yamaguchi	3	1	75.00
(United States) Todd Birr	2	2	18.00
(Netherlands) Jaap van Dorp	2	2	170.10
(United States) Korey Dropkin	1	3	85.00

=== Round Robin Results ===
All draw times are listed in Eastern Time (UTC−05:00).

==== Draw 1 ====
Friday, August 30, 10:30

Sheet 3	1	2	3	4	5	6	7	8	Final
(Switzerland) Jan Hess 🔨	1	2	0	1	4	0	1	X	9
(Switzerland) Lucien Lottenbach	0	0	1	0	0	2	0	X	3

Sheet 4	1	2	3	4	5	6	7	8	Final
(Japan) Yuta Matsumura	0	1	0	2	0	1	0	2	6
(Japan) Yusuke Morozumi 🔨	1	0	1	0	1	0	1	0	4

Sheet 5	1	2	3	4	5	6	7	8	Final
(Ontario) Jacob Horgan	0	0	0	0	0	2	0	0	2
(Japan) Tsuyoshi Yamaguchi 🔨	1	0	1	0	1	0	0	2	5

Sheet 6	1	2	3	4	5	6	7	8	Final
(Netherlands) Jaap van Dorp	0	0	0	0	1	0	0	X	1
(South Korea) Kim Chang-min 🔨	0	0	3	0	0	2	3	X	8

==== Draw 2 ====
Friday, August 30, 13:30

Sheet 1	1	2	3	4	5	6	7	8	9	Final
(Italy) Joël Retornaz	1	0	1	2	0	3	0	0	1	8
(Switzerland) Yannick Schwaller 🔨	0	3	0	0	1	0	1	2	0	7

Sheet 3	1	2	3	4	5	6	7	8	Final
(United States) Korey Dropkin 🔨	0	0	0	0	1	0	X	X	1
(United States) Rich Ruohonen	0	2	1	1	0	3	X	X	7

Sheet 8	1	2	3	4	5	6	7	8	9	Final
(United States) Scott Dunnam 🔨	0	0	1	0	0	1	1	0	1	4
(Quebec) Jean-Sébastien Roy	0	0	0	0	2	0	0	1	0	3

==== Draw 3 ====
Friday, August 30, 16:00

Sheet 1	1	2	3	4	5	6	7	8	Final
(Scotland) Cameron Bryce 🔨	2	1	0	2	0	1	0	0	6
(Ontario) Matthew Hall	0	0	1	0	1	0	2	0	4

Sheet 2	1	2	3	4	5	6	7	8	Final
(Switzerland) Lucien Lottenbach	0	0	3	0	3	0	0	X	6
(Japan) Yusuke Morozumi 🔨	0	1	0	1	0	1	1	X	4

Sheet 3	1	2	3	4	5	6	7	8	9	Final
(South Korea) Kim Chang-min	0	0	2	0	3	0	0	2	0	7
(Japan) Tsuyoshi Yamaguchi 🔨	1	0	0	2	0	3	1	0	1	8

Sheet 7	1	2	3	4	5	6	7	8	Final
(Ontario) Jacob Horgan	0	0	2	0	0	0	0	X	2
(Netherlands) Jaap van Dorp 🔨	2	0	0	0	0	2	1	X	5

Sheet 8	1	2	3	4	5	6	7	8	Final
(Ontario) Mark Kean	0	0	0	1	0	0	X	X	1
(Saskatchewan) Kirk Muyres 🔨	0	1	3	0	1	2	X	X	7

==== Draw 4 ====
Friday, August 30, 19:00

Sheet 4	1	2	3	4	5	6	7	8	Final
(United States) Todd Birr 🔨	1	0	1	2	0	2	X	X	6
(Ontario) John Willsey	0	1	0	0	1	0	X	X	2

Sheet 7	1	2	3	4	5	6	7	8	9	Final
(Ontario) Scott McDonald	0	0	1	0	0	2	1	0	1	5
(Ontario) Sam Steep 🔨	1	1	0	0	1	0	0	1	0	4

Sheet 8	1	2	3	4	5	6	7	8	Final
(Ontario) Rob Ainsley	0	0	0	0	0	1	0	X	1
(Manitoba) Tanner Horgan 🔨	0	0	1	1	1	0	3	X	6

==== Draw 5 ====
Friday, August 30, 21:30

Sheet 2	1	2	3	4	5	6	7	8	Final
(Switzerland) Jan Hess	0	1	1	1	0	1	1	X	5
(Quebec) Steve Holdaway 🔨	0	0	0	0	1	0	0	X	1

Sheet 3	1	2	3	4	5	6	7	8	Final
(United States) Scott Dunnam 🔨	0	2	0	1	0	0	0	X	3
(Switzerland) Yannick Schwaller	0	0	1	0	2	1	1	X	5

Sheet 4	1	2	3	4	5	6	7	8	Final
(Ontario) Jason Camm 🔨	1	0	1	0	0	1	0	X	3
(Saskatchewan) Kirk Muyres	0	2	0	1	1	0	2	X	6

Sheet 6	1	2	3	4	5	6	7	8	Final
(Scotland) Cameron Bryce	0	0	1	0	0	2	2	X	5
(Ontario) Pat Ferris 🔨	0	1	0	1	0	0	0	X	2

==== Draw 6 ====
Saturday, August 31, 08:00

Sheet 2	1	2	3	4	5	6	7	8	Final
(Quebec) Frederic Lawton	1	0	0	1	X	X	X	X	2
(Italy) Joël Retornaz 🔨	0	3	6	0	X	X	X	X	9

Sheet 5	1	2	3	4	5	6	7	8	Final
(Ontario) John Willsey 🔨	2	0	0	2	0	1	0	1	6
(United States) Korey Dropkin	0	1	1	0	1	0	2	0	5

Sheet 6	1	2	3	4	5	6	7	8	Final
(Ontario) Matthew Hall	0	2	0	1	0	1	0	X	4
(Ontario) Sam Steep 🔨	3	0	1	0	1	0	1	X	6

Sheet 7	1	2	3	4	5	6	7	8	9	Final
(Switzerland) Lucien Lottenbach	0	2	0	1	0	0	0	1	0	4
(Japan) Yuta Matsumura 🔨	1	0	2	0	0	1	0	0	1	5

Sheet 8	1	2	3	4	5	6	7	8	Final
(United States) Todd Birr	0	0	0	0	1	0	X	X	1
(South Korea) Kim Chang-min 🔨	1	2	1	1	0	2	X	X	7

==== Draw 7 ====
Saturday, August 31, 10:30

Sheet 1	1	2	3	4	5	6	7	8	Final
(Ontario) Pat Ferris	0	1	0	0	0	X	X	X	1
(Ontario) Scott McDonald 🔨	3	0	0	2	2	X	X	X	7

Sheet 2	1	2	3	4	5	6	7	8	9	Final
(Quebec) Jean-Sébastien Roy	0	3	0	1	0	1	0	1	0	6
(Switzerland) Yannick Schwaller 🔨	2	0	2	0	1	0	1	0	1	7

Sheet 4	1	2	3	4	5	6	7	8	Final
(Ontario) Rob Ainsley	2	0	4	0	1	0	2	X	9
(Ontario) Mark Kean 🔨	0	2	0	2	0	1	0	X	5

Sheet 7	1	2	3	4	5	6	7	8	Final
(Quebec) Steve Holdaway 🔨	2	1	0	1	1	0	0	X	5
(Japan) Yusuke Morozumi	0	0	1	0	0	1	1	X	3

==== Draw 8 ====
Saturday, August 31, 13:30

Sheet 1	1	2	3	4	5	6	7	8	Final
(United States) Scott Dunnam	1	0	0	1	0	3	0	1	6
(Quebec) Frederic Lawton 🔨	0	1	1	0	1	0	1	0	4

Sheet 2	1	2	3	4	5	6	7	8	Final
(Ontario) Jacob Horgan	0	0	0	0	X	X	X	X	0
(United States) Korey Dropkin 🔨	1	2	2	3	X	X	X	X	8

Sheet 4	1	2	3	4	5	6	7	8	Final
(Scotland) Cameron Bryce 🔨	2	0	1	0	3	0	1	X	7
(Ontario) Sam Steep	0	1	0	1	0	1	0	X	3

Sheet 5	1	2	3	4	5	6	7	8	Final
(United States) Todd Birr	0	0	0	0	0	X	X	X	0
(United States) Rich Ruohonen 🔨	1	1	1	3	1	X	X	X	7

Sheet 6	1	2	3	4	5	6	7	8	Final
(Manitoba) Tanner Horgan	1	0	1	1	0	3	X	X	6
(Saskatchewan) Kirk Muyres 🔨	0	1	0	0	1	0	X	X	2

Sheet 8	1	2	3	4	5	6	7	8	Final
(Ontario) John Willsey	0	0	0	0	1	1	1	0	3
(Japan) Tsuyoshi Yamaguchi 🔨	0	0	0	2	0	0	0	2	4

==== Draw 9 ====
Saturday, August 31, 16:00

Sheet 6	1	2	3	4	5	6	7	8	Final
(Quebec) Steve Holdaway 🔨	1	0	0	0	2	0	X	X	3
(Japan) Yuta Matsumura	0	2	4	1	0	0	X	X	7

Sheet 7	1	2	3	4	5	6	7	8	Final
(Ontario) Jason Camm 🔨	1	0	3	1	0	0	0	X	5
(Ontario) Mark Kean	0	1	0	0	0	1	1	X	3

==== Draw 10 ====
Saturday, August 31, 19:00

Sheet 4	1	2	3	4	5	6	7	8	Final
(Italy) Joël Retornaz	0	3	0	0	2	0	0	2	7
(Quebec) Jean-Sébastien Roy 🔨	1	0	1	3	0	0	1	0	6

Sheet 5	1	2	3	4	5	6	7	8	Final
(Quebec) Frederic Lawton 🔨	0	1	0	1	0	X	X	X	2
(Switzerland) Yannick Schwaller	1	0	4	0	3	X	X	X	8

Sheet 6	1	2	3	4	5	6	7	8	Final
(Switzerland) Jan Hess	0	1	1	0	1	0	2	2	7
(Japan) Yusuke Morozumi 🔨	2	0	0	2	0	1	0	0	5

Sheet 7	1	2	3	4	5	6	7	8	Final
(Ontario) Pat Ferris	0	1	2	2	0	1	X	X	6
(Ontario) Matthew Hall 🔨	0	0	0	0	1	0	X	X	1

Sheet 8	1	2	3	4	5	6	7	8	Final
(United States) Rich Ruohonen 🔨	2	0	1	0	2	1	0	1	7
(Netherlands) Jaap van Dorp	0	2	0	1	0	0	2	0	5

==== Draw 11 ====
Saturday, August 31, 21:30

Sheet 2	1	2	3	4	5	6	7	8	Final
(Scotland) Cameron Bryce 🔨	1	4	0	0	2	0	1	X	8
(Ontario) Scott McDonald	0	0	2	0	0	2	0	X	4

Sheet 5	1	2	3	4	5	6	7	8	Final
(Ontario) Jason Camm 🔨	0	0	0	1	0	1	X	X	2
(Manitoba) Tanner Horgan	1	1	3	0	1	0	X	X	6

Sheet 7	1	2	3	4	5	6	7	8	Final
(Ontario) Rob Ainsley 🔨	1	0	0	1	0	0	1	1	4
(Saskatchewan) Kirk Muyres	0	0	1	0	1	1	0	0	3

==== Draw 12 ====
Sunday, September 1, 09:00

Sheet 1	1	2	3	4	5	6	7	8	Final
(United States) Todd Birr 🔨	0	0	2	0	1	0	0	2	5
(Ontario) Jacob Horgan	0	1	0	1	0	1	1	0	4

Sheet 3	1	2	3	4	5	6	7	8	9	Final
(Quebec) Frederic Lawton	1	1	0	1	0	0	0	2	0	5
(Quebec) Jean-Sébastien Roy 🔨	0	0	1	0	1	2	1	0	1	6

Sheet 5	1	2	3	4	5	6	7	8	Final
(Ontario) Pat Ferris	0	0	1	2	0	0	1	0	4
(Ontario) Sam Steep 🔨	1	1	0	0	1	1	0	1	5

Sheet 7	1	2	3	4	5	6	7	8	Final
(United States) Scott Dunnam 🔨	0	0	1	0	1	0	X	X	2
(Italy) Joël Retornaz	1	0	0	3	0	3	X	X	7

Sheet 8	1	2	3	4	5	6	7	8	Final
(Switzerland) Jan Hess 🔨	0	0	3	0	0	0	3	0	6
(Japan) Yuta Matsumura	0	1	0	1	0	1	0	1	4

==== Draw 13 ====
Sunday, September 1, 12:00

Sheet 2	1	2	3	4	5	6	7	8	Final
(Ontario) Tanner Horgan 🔨	1	1	0	0	1	0	1	1	5
(Ontario) Mark Kean	0	0	2	0	0	1	0	0	3

Sheet 3	1	2	3	4	5	6	7	8	Final
(Netherlands) Jaap van Dorp	0	0	1	0	2	0	1	1	5
(Ontario) John Willsey 🔨	0	2	0	1	0	1	0	0	4

Sheet 4	1	2	3	4	5	6	7	8	Final
(United States) Rich Ruohonen	0	0	0	0	3	0	0	1	4
(Japan) Tsuyoshi Yamaguchi 🔨	0	0	0	1	0	0	1	0	2

Sheet 5	1	2	3	4	5	6	7	8	9	Final
(Ontario) Matthew Hall	0	3	0	0	1	0	1	0	1	6
(Ontario) Scott McDonald 🔨	1	0	1	0	0	1	0	2	0	5

Sheet 6	1	2	3	4	5	6	7	8	Final
(Ontario) Rob Ainsley	0	0	0	0	X	X	X	X	0
(Ontario) Jason Camm 🔨	2	5	1	2	X	X	X	X	10

Sheet 7	1	2	3	4	5	6	7	8	Final
(South Korea) Kim Chang-min 🔨	1	0	0	2	1	0	0	1	5
(United States) Korey Dropkin	0	1	1	0	0	1	1	0	4

Sheet 8	1	2	3	4	5	6	7	8	Final
(Quebec) Steve Holdaway	0	2	1	0	1	0	0	X	4
(Switzerland) Lucien Lottenbach 🔨	1	0	0	3	0	2	3	X	9

=== Playoffs ===
Qualification Games
8	(Japan) Yuta Matsumura	3
9	(South Korea) Kim Chang-min	4
5	(Italy) Joël Retornaz	4
12	(Switzerland) Lucien Lottenbach	3
7	(Japan) Tsuyoshi Yamaguchi	7
10	(United States) Todd Birr	3
6	(Switzerland) Yannick Schwaller	7
11	(United States) Scott Dunnam	4

Quarterfinals
1	(Switzerland) Jan Hess	6
9	(South Korea) Kim Chang-min	7
4	(Scotland) Cameron Bryce	6
5	(Italy) Joël Retornaz	5
2	(United States) Rich Ruohonen	6
7	(Japan) Tsuyoshi Yamaguchi	3
3	(Manitoba) Tanner Horgan	2
6	(Switzerland) Yannick Schwaller	7

Semifinals
9	(South Korea) Kim Chang-min	9
4	(Scotland) Cameron Bryce	3
2	(United States) Rich Ruohonen	3
6	(Switzerland) Yannick Schwaller	8

Final
9	(South Korea) Kim Chang-min	3
6	(Switzerland) Yannick Schwaller	7

==== Qualification Games ====
Sunday, September 1, 18:00

Sheet 1	1	2	3	4	5	6	7	8	Final
(Japan) Yuta Matsumura 🔨	0	0	0	0	2	0	1	0	3
(South Korea) Kim Chang-min	1	0	1	0	0	1	0	1	4

Sheet 2	1	2	3	4	5	6	7	8	Final
(Japan) Tsuyoshi Yamaguchi 🔨	1	1	0	1	2	0	2	X	7
(United States) Todd Birr	0	0	2	0	0	1	0	X	3

Sheet 3	1	2	3	4	5	6	7	8	Final
(Switzerland) Yannick Schwaller 🔨	1	1	0	3	0	0	2	X	7
(United States) Scott Dunnam	0	0	1	0	2	1	0	X	4

Sheet 6	1	2	3	4	5	6	7	8	Final
(Italy) Joël Retornaz 🔨	0	1	0	0	0	0	3	0	4
(Switzerland) Lucien Lottenbach	0	0	0	0	2	0	0	1	3

==== Quarterfinals ====
Sunday, September 1, 21:30

Sheet 4	1	2	3	4	5	6	7	8	Final
(Manitoba) Tanner Horgan 🔨	0	1	0	1	0	0	0	X	2
(Switzerland) Yannick Schwaller	1	0	1	0	1	1	3	X	7

Sheet 5	1	2	3	4	5	6	7	8	Final
(Scotland) Cameron Bryce	0	1	0	0	2	0	2	1	6
(Italy) Joël Retornaz 🔨	1	0	0	2	0	2	0	0	5

Sheet 7	1	2	3	4	5	6	7	8	Final
(United States) Rich Ruohonen 🔨	0	2	0	1	0	0	3	X	6
(Japan) Tsuyoshi Yamaguchi	0	0	2	0	1	0	0	X	3

Sheet 8	1	2	3	4	5	6	7	8	Final
(Switzerland) Jan Hess 🔨	1	0	1	0	3	0	1	0	6
(South Korea) Kim Chang-min	0	1	0	3	0	0	0	3	7

==== Semifinals ====
Monday, September 2, 09:00

Sheet 5	1	2	3	4	5	6	7	8	Final
(United States) Rich Ruohonen 🔨	0	2	0	1	0	X	X	X	3
(Switzerland) Yannick Schwaller	2	0	4	0	2	X	X	X	8

Sheet 6	1	2	3	4	5	6	7	8	Final
(South Korea) Kim Chang-min	0	2	1	3	0	3	X	X	9
(Scotland) Cameron Bryce 🔨	2	0	0	0	1	0	X	X	3

==== Final ====
Monday, September 2, 12:30

Sheet 4	1	2	3	4	5	6	7	8	Final
(South Korea) Kim Chang-min 🔨	0	1	0	2	0	0	0	0	3
(Switzerland) Yannick Schwaller	0	0	2	0	1	1	1	2	7

== Women ==
=== Teams ===
The teams are listed as follows:

Skip	Third	Second	Lead	Locale
Megan Balsdon	Lynn Kreviazuk	Rachelle Strybosch	Tess Bobbie	London, Ontario
Chrissy Cadorin	Joanne Curtis	Mallory Kean	Laura LaBonte	Thornhill, Ontario
Theresa Cannon	Karen Klein	Vanessa Foster	Raunora Westcott	Winnipeg, Manitoba
Hollie Duncan	Laura Hickey	Cheryl Kreviazuk	Karen Sagle	Toronto, Ontario
Binia Feltscher	Carole Howald	Stefanie Berset	Larissa Hari	Langenthal, Switzerland
Cecilia Fransson	Linnea Svedberg	Vilma Ahlstron	Jenny Jonasson	Skellefteå, Sweden
Susan Froud	Kristina Brauch	Jessica Humphries	Karen Rowsell	Stroud, Ontario
Gim Un-chi	Um Min-ji	Kim Su-ji	Seol Ye-eun	Gyeonggido, South Korea
Lauren Horton	Carly Howard	Margot Flemming	Megan Arnold	Waterloo, Ontario
Daniela Jentsch	Emira Abbes	Klara-Hermine Fomm	Analena Jentsch	Füssen, Germany
Kaitlyn Jones	Allison Flaxey	Clancy Grandy	Morgan Lavell	Toronto, Ontario
Kim Eun-jung	Kim Kyeong-ae	Kim Seon-yeong	Kim Yeong-mi	Uiseong, South Korea
Tori Koana	Yuna Kotani	Mao Ishigaki	Arisa Kotani	Yamanashi, Japan
Anna Kubešková	Alžběta Baudyšová	Michaela Baudyšová	Ežen Kolčevská	Prague, Czech Republic
Eve Muirhead	Lauren Gray	Jennifer Dodds	Vicky Wright	Stirling, Scotland
Jestyn Murphy	Janet Murphy	Stephanie Matheson	Grace Holyoke	Mississauga, Ontario
Kelsey Rocque	Danielle Schmiemann	Becca Hebert	Jesse Marlow	Edmonton, Alberta
Irene Schori	Lara Stocker	Roxanne Hacritier	Isabelle Maillard	Limmattal, Switzerland
Stephanie Senneker	Rebecca Andrew	Emilia Juocys	Maya Willertz	(United States) Kalamazoo, Michigan
Anna Sidorova	Julia Portunova	Olga Kotelnikova	Julia Guzieva	Moscow, Russia
Jamie Sinclair	Cory Christensen	Vicky Persinger	Sarah Anderson	(United States) Chaska, Minnesota
Laurie St-Georges	Hailey Armstrong	Emily Riley	Cynthia St-Georges	Montreal, Quebec
Briar Hürlimann (Fourth)	Elena Stern (Skip)	Lisa Gisler	Céline Koller	Oberwallis, Switzerland
Alina Pätz (Fourth)	Silvana Tirinzoni (Skip)	Esther Neuenschwander	Melanie Barbezat	Aarau, Switzerland
Sayaka Yoshimura	Kaho Onodera	Anna Ohmiya	Yumie Funayama	Sapporo, Japan
Veronica Zappone	Stefania Constantini	Angela Romei	Frederica Ghedina	Pinerolo, Italy

=== Round Robin Standings ===
Final Round Robin Standings

Key
Teams to Playoffs

Pool A	W	L	SO
(Switzerland) Silvana Tirinzoni	4	0	92.00
(Alberta) Kelsey Rocque	3	1	175.50
(South Korea) Kim Eun-jung	2	2	41.00
(Italy) Veronica Zappone	2	2	121.00
(United States) Jamie Sinclair	1	3	148.50
(Sweden) Cecilia Fransson	0	4	76.00

Pool B	W	L	SO
(Germany) Daniela Jentsch	4	0	137.40
(Ontario) Megan Balsdon	3	1	12.00
(United States) Stephanie Senneker	1	3	38.00
(Japan) Sayaka Yoshimura	1	3	75.00
(Ontario) Chrissy Cadorin	1	3	282.50

Pool C	W	L	SO
(Ontario) Hollie Duncan	4	0	61.10
(Switzerland) Elena Stern	2	2	30.00
(Ontario) Jestyn Murphy	2	2	182.00
(Ontario) Lauren Horton	1	3	52.50
(Czech Republic) Anna Kubešková	1	3	394.00

Pool D	W	L	SO
(Scotland) Eve Muirhead	3	1	40.80
(South Korea) Gim Un-chi	3	1	121.00
(Switzerland) Irene Schori	2	2	286.30
(Quebec) Laurie St-Georges	1	3	113.50
(Switzerland) Binia Feltscher	1	3	330.00

Pool E	W	L	SO
(Manitoba) Theresa Cannon	3	1	83.00
(Ontario) Susan Froud	3	1	91.00
(Russia) Anna Sidorova	2	2	39.00
(Ontario) Kaitlyn Jones	2	2	123.00
(Japan) Tori Koana	0	4	304.40

=== Round Robin Results ===
All draw times are listed in Eastern Time (UTC−05:00).

==== Draw 1 ====
Friday, August 30, 10:30

Sheet 1	1	2	3	4	5	6	7	8	Final
(South Korea) Kim Eun-jung	1	1	0	3	0	2	1	X	8
(Sweden) Cecilia Fransson 🔨	0	0	1	0	1	0	0	X	2

Sheet 2	1	2	3	4	5	6	7	8	Final
(Switzerland) Silvana Tirinzoni	0	2	1	0	2	0	2	X	7
(Italy) Veronica Zappone 🔨	1	0	0	3	0	1	0	X	5

Sheet 7	1	2	3	4	5	6	7	8	Final
(Switzerland) Binia Feltscher 🔨	0	0	0	1	0	2	1	0	4
(Switzerland) Irene Schori	1	0	2	0	1	0	0	1	5

Sheet 8	1	2	3	4	5	6	7	8	Final
(South Korea) Gim Un-chi 🔨	1	0	2	0	0	1	0	2	6
(Scotland) Eve Muirhead	0	0	0	0	1	0	2	0	3

==== Draw 2 ====
Friday, August 30, 13:30

Sheet 2	1	2	3	4	5	6	7	8	Final
(Japan) Tori Koana	0	0	0	1	0	3	0	0	4
(Russia) Anna Sidorova 🔨	0	0	1	0	2	0	0	2	5

Sheet 4	1	2	3	4	5	6	7	8	Final
(Czech Republic) Anna Kubešková	3	0	1	0	2	0	0	1	7
(Switzerland) Elena Stern 🔨	0	2	0	2	0	1	1	0	6

Sheet 5	1	2	3	4	5	6	7	8	Final
(Ontario) Hollie Duncan 🔨	0	2	0	2	0	2	0	X	6
(Ontario) Lauren Horton	0	0	1	0	1	0	1	X	3

Sheet 6	1	2	3	4	5	6	7	8	Final
(Ontario) Megan Balsdon 🔨	2	0	0	2	0	2	0	X	6
(United States) Stephanie Senneker	0	0	1	0	1	0	2	X	4

Sheet 7	1	2	3	4	5	6	7	8	Final
(Germany) Daniela Jentsch 🔨	0	0	2	0	1	0	2	X	5
(Japan) Sayaka Yoshimura	0	0	0	2	0	1	0	X	3

==== Draw 3 ====
Friday, August 30, 16:00

Sheet 4	1	2	3	4	5	6	7	8	Final
(Alberta) Kelsey Rocque 🔨	0	0	1	2	0	0	X	X	3
(Switzerland) Silvana Tirinzoni	2	1	0	0	4	1	X	X	8

Sheet 5	1	2	3	4	5	6	7	8	Final
(Scotland) Eve Muirhead 🔨	2	0	2	1	2	X	X	X	7
(Switzerland) Irene Schori	0	1	0	0	0	X	X	X	1

Sheet 6	1	2	3	4	5	6	7	8	Final
(United States) Jamie Sinclair 🔨	1	0	2	3	0	0	4	X	10
(Sweden) Cecilia Fransson	0	2	0	0	2	1	0	X	5

==== Draw 4 ====
Friday, August 30, 19:00

Sheet 1	1	2	3	4	5	6	7	8	9	Final
(Manitoba) Theresa Cannon 🔨	3	2	0	1	0	0	1	0	1	8
(Ontario) Kaitlyn Jones	0	0	2	0	3	1	0	1	0	7

Sheet 2	1	2	3	4	5	6	7	8	Final
(Ontario) Hollie Duncan 🔨	0	0	2	0	1	1	0	X	4
(Switzerland) Elena Stern	0	1	0	1	0	0	0	X	2

Sheet 3	1	2	3	4	5	6	7	8	Final
(Germany) Daniela Jentsch 🔨	3	1	0	0	0	2	1	X	7
(United States) Stephanie Senneker	0	0	1	0	3	0	0	X	4

Sheet 5	1	2	3	4	5	6	7	8	Final
(Ontario) Megan Balsdon 🔨	1	1	0	0	2	1	X	X	5
(Ontario) Chrissy Cadorin	0	0	1	0	0	0	X	X	1

Sheet 6	1	2	3	4	5	6	7	8	Final
(Ontario) Lauren Horton 🔨	2	0	0	0	0	X	X	X	2
(Ontario) Jestyn Murphy	0	1	2	2	5	X	X	X	10

==== Draw 5 ====
Friday, August 30, 21:30

Sheet 1	1	2	3	4	5	6	7	8	9	Final
(Ontario) Susan Froud	0	1	1	0	1	0	2	0	1	6
(Japan) Tori Koana 🔨	2	0	0	1	0	1	0	1	0	5

Sheet 5	1	2	3	4	5	6	7	8	Final
(South Korea) Gim Un-chi	1	0	3	0	0	0	0	0	4
(Quebec) Laurie St-Georges 🔨	0	1	0	1	0	1	0	2	5

Sheet 7	1	2	3	4	5	6	7	8	Final
(Italy) Veronica Zappone 🔨	1	0	0	1	0	0	1	0	3
(Alberta) Kelsey Rocque	0	1	1	0	0	1	0	2	5

Sheet 8	1	2	3	4	5	6	7	8	Final
(South Korea) Kim Eun-jung 🔨	1	0	2	0	1	1	1	X	6
(United States) Jamie Sinclair	0	1	0	1	0	0	0	X	2

==== Draw 6 ====
Saturday, August 31, 08:00

Sheet 1	1	2	3	4	5	6	7	8	Final
(Ontario) Chrissy Cadorin 🔨	1	0	1	0	3	0	1	0	6
(Japan) Sayaka Yoshimura	0	1	0	1	0	1	0	1	4

Sheet 3	1	2	3	4	5	6	7	8	Final
(Czech Republic) Anna Kubešková	0	1	0	0	1	0	0	1	3
(Ontario) Jestyn Murphy 🔨	2	0	1	0	0	0	1	0	4

Sheet 4	1	2	3	4	5	6	7	8	Final
(Ontario) Megan Balsdon 🔨	0	1	0	1	0	0	2	0	4
(Germany) Daniela Jentsch	0	0	1	0	1	2	0	1	5

==== Draw 7 ====
Saturday, August 31, 10:30

Sheet 3	1	2	3	4	5	6	7	8	Final
(Manitoba) Theresa Cannon	0	1	0	0	1	0	0	X	2
(Russia) Anna Sidorova 🔨	2	0	1	2	0	1	1	X	7

Sheet 5	1	2	3	4	5	6	7	8	Final
(Ontario) Susan Froud	0	1	0	3	0	1	1	1	7
(Ontario) Kaitlyn Jones 🔨	1	0	1	0	3	0	0	0	5

Sheet 6	1	2	3	4	5	6	7	8	Final
(South Korea) Gim Un-chi 🔨	4	1	0	2	0	1	X	X	8
(Switzerland) Irene Schori	0	0	2	0	1	0	X	X	3

Sheet 8	1	2	3	4	5	6	7	8	Final
(Switzerland) Binia Feltscher	1	0	4	2	0	0	0	X	7
(Quebec) Laurie St-Georges 🔨	0	1	0	0	2	1	1	X	5

==== Draw 8 ====
Saturday, August 31, 13:30

Sheet 3	1	2	3	4	5	6	7	8	Final
(Ontario) Lauren Horton 🔨	1	0	1	0	1	0	1	0	4
(Switzerland) Elena Stern	0	2	0	1	0	2	0	1	6

Sheet 7	1	2	3	4	5	6	7	8	Final
(Ontario) Chrissy Cadorin	0	0	1	1	0	0	0	0	2
(United States) Stephanie Senneker 🔨	0	1	0	0	0	1	1	4	7

==== Draw 9 ====
Saturday, August 31, 16:00

Sheet 1	1	2	3	4	5	6	7	8	Final
(Ontario) Hollie Duncan 🔨	2	0	1	0	0	0	3	X	6
(Czech Republic) Anna Kubešková	0	1	0	1	0	1	0	X	3

Sheet 2	1	2	3	4	5	6	7	8	9	Final
(South Korea) Kim Eun-jung 🔨	2	0	1	0	0	1	0	2	0	6
(Alberta) Kelsey Rocque	0	2	0	0	3	0	1	0	1	7

Sheet 3	1	2	3	4	5	6	7	8	Final
(Switzerland) Silvana Tirinzoni 🔨	0	2	0	1	3	0	X	X	6
(United States) Jamie Sinclair	0	0	0	0	0	1	X	X	1

Sheet 4	1	2	3	4	5	6	7	8	Final
(Manitoba) Theresa Cannon 🔨	1	0	2	1	0	1	0	1	6
(Japan) Tori Koana	0	1	0	0	2	0	1	0	4

Sheet 5	1	2	3	4	5	6	7	8	Final
(Italy) Veronica Zappone	0	0	2	2	4	X	X	X	8
(Sweden) Cecilia Fransson 🔨	0	1	0	0	0	X	X	X	1

Sheet 8	1	2	3	4	5	6	7	8	Final
(Ontario) Susan Froud 🔨	2	0	0	0	1	1	0	2	6
(Russia) Anna Sidorova	0	1	1	1	0	0	2	0	5

==== Draw 10 ====
Saturday, August 31, 19:00

Sheet 1	1	2	3	4	5	6	7	8	Final
(Ontario) Jestyn Murphy	0	0	0	0	X	X	X	X	0
(Switzerland) Elena Stern 🔨	1	4	1	1	X	X	X	X	7

Sheet 2	1	2	3	4	5	6	7	8	Final
(Ontario) Megan Balsdon 🔨	2	0	0	1	2	0	3	X	8
(Japan) Sayaka Yoshimura	0	0	2	0	0	1	0	X	3

Sheet 3	1	2	3	4	5	6	7	8	Final
(Switzerland) Binia Feltscher	0	4	0	0	0	0	1	X	5
(Scotland) Eve Muirhead 🔨	1	0	2	1	1	1	0	X	6

==== Draw 11 ====
Saturday, August 31, 21:30

Sheet 1	1	2	3	4	5	6	7	8	Final
(Switzerland) Irene Schori	0	0	1	3	0	4	X	X	8
(Quebec) Laurie St-Georges 🔨	0	1	0	0	1	0	X	X	2

Sheet 3	1	2	3	4	5	6	7	8	Final
(Alberta) Kelsey Rocque	4	0	2	0	0	1	3	X	10
(Sweden) Cecilia Fransson 🔨	0	1	0	1	1	0	0	X	3

Sheet 4	1	2	3	4	5	6	7	8	Final
(United States) Jamie Sinclair	0	0	0	5	0	0	0	X	5
(Italy) Veronica Zappone 🔨	0	1	3	0	1	1	2	X	8

Sheet 6	1	2	3	4	5	6	7	8	Final
(Switzerland) Silvana Tirinzoni 🔨	3	0	0	0	2	0	0	1	6
(South Korea) Kim Eun-jung	0	0	1	2	0	1	1	0	5

Sheet 8	1	2	3	4	5	6	7	8	Final
(Ontario) Kaitlyn Jones	2	0	1	0	1	0	3	X	7
(Japan) Tori Koana 🔨	0	0	0	2	0	1	0	X	3

==== Draw 12 ====
Sunday, September 1, 09:00

Sheet 2	1	2	3	4	5	6	7	8	Final
(Ontario) Lauren Horton	1	1	2	0	2	4	X	X	10
(Czech Republic) Anna Kubešková 🔨	0	0	0	1	0	0	X	X	1

Sheet 4	1	2	3	4	5	6	7	8	Final
(United States) Stephanie Senneker 🔨	0	0	1	0	0	1	X	X	2
(Japan) Sayaka Yoshimura	2	0	0	3	3	0	X	X	8

Sheet 6	1	2	3	4	5	6	7	8	Final
(Manitoba) Theresa Cannon 🔨	2	0	4	0	2	X	X	X	8
(Ontario) Susan Froud	0	1	0	1	0	X	X	X	2

==== Draw 13 ====
Sunday, September 1, 12:00

Sheet 1	1	2	3	4	5	6	7	8	9	Final
(Switzerland) Binia Feltscher	0	0	0	3	1	1	0	0	0	5
(South Korea) Gim Un-chi 🔨	1	1	0	0	0	0	2	1	1	6

==== Draw 14 ====
Sunday, September 1, 14:30

Sheet 2	1	2	3	4	5	6	7	8	Final
(Scotland) Eve Muirhead 🔨	2	0	3	0	2	0	1	0	8
(Quebec) Laurie St-Georges	0	3	0	1	0	2	0	1	7

Sheet 4	1	2	3	4	5	6	7	8	Final
(Ontario) Hollie Duncan	0	0	0	6	0	0	3	X	9
(Ontario) Jestyn Murphy 🔨	2	2	1	0	0	1	0	X	6

Sheet 5	1	2	3	4	5	6	7	8	Final
(Ontario) Chrissy Cadorin	1	1	0	0	0	2	1	0	5
(Germany) Daniela Jentsch 🔨	0	0	2	2	0	0	0	2	6

Sheet 6	1	2	3	4	5	6	7	8	Final
(Ontario) Kaitlyn Jones	0	0	2	1	0	5	X	X	8
(Russia) Anna Sidorova 🔨	0	1	0	0	1	0	X	X	2

=== Playoffs ===
Qualification Games
8	(South Korea) Gim Un-chi	4
9	(Alberta) Kelsey Rocque	6
5	(Scotland) Eve Muirhead	6
12	(South Korea) Kim Eun-jung	3
7	(Ontario) Susan Froud	1
10	(Switzerland) Elena Stern	6
6	(Manitoba) Theresa Cannon	7
11	(Russia) Anna Sidorova	6

Quarterfinals
1	(Ontario) Hollie Duncan	2
9	(Alberta) Kelsey Rocque	7
4	(Ontario) Megan Balsdon	3
5	(Scotland) Eve Muirhead	7
2	(Switzerland) Silvana Tirinzoni	10
10	(Switzerland) Elena Stern	3
3	(Germany) Daniela Jentsch	9
6	(Manitoba) Theresa Cannon	3

Semifinals
9	(Alberta) Kelsey Rocque	5
5	(Scotland) Eve Muirhead	7
2	(Switzerland) Silvana Tirinzoni	7
3	(Germany) Daniela Jentsch	6

Final
5	(Scotland) Eve Muirhead	5
2	(Switzerland) Silvana Tirinzoni	2

==== Qualification Games ====
Sunday, September 1, 18:00

Sheet 4	1	2	3	4	5	6	7	8	Final
(South Korea) Gim Un-chi	1	0	0	2	0	1	0	X	4
(Alberta) Kelsey Rocque 🔨	0	1	3	0	1	0	1	X	6

Sheet 5	1	2	3	4	5	6	7	8	9	Final
(Manitoba) Theresa Cannon 🔨	1	1	1	0	1	0	2	0	1	7
(Russia) Anna Sidorova	0	0	0	2	0	2	0	2	0	6

Sheet 7	1	2	3	4	5	6	7	8	Final
(Ontario) Susan Froud 🔨	0	0	1	0	0	0	X	X	1
(Switzerland) Elena Stern	1	2	0	0	2	1	X	X	6

Sheet 8	1	2	3	4	5	6	7	8	Final
(Scotland) Eve Muirhead 🔨	2	0	0	0	2	1	1	X	6
(South Korea) Kim Eun-jung	0	2	0	1	0	0	0	X	3

==== Quarterfinals ====
Sunday, September 1, 21:30

Sheet 1	1	2	3	4	5	6	7	8	Final
(Ontario) Megan Balsdon 🔨	0	2	0	0	1	0	0	X	3
(Scotland) Eve Muirhead	1	0	1	2	0	3	0	X	7

Sheet 2	1	2	3	4	5	6	7	8	Final
(Switzerland) Silvana Tirinzoni 🔨	1	0	3	0	2	4	X	X	10
(Switzerland) Elena Stern	0	1	0	2	0	0	X	X	3

Sheet 3	1	2	3	4	5	6	7	8	Final
(Germany) Daniela Jentsch 🔨	2	0	0	5	0	2	X	X	9
(Manitoba) Theresa Cannon	0	1	1	0	1	0	X	X	3

Sheet 6	1	2	3	4	5	6	7	8	Final
(Ontario) Hollie Duncan 🔨	1	0	1	0	0	0	X	X	2
(Alberta) Kelsey Rocque	0	0	0	3	2	2	X	X	7

==== Semifinals ====
Monday, September 2, 09:00

Sheet 3	1	2	3	4	5	6	7	8	Final
(Alberta) Kelsey Rocque	0	0	1	1	0	2	1	X	5
(Scotland) Eve Muirhead 🔨	3	1	0	0	3	0	0	X	7

Sheet 4	1	2	3	4	5	6	7	8	Final
(Switzerland) Silvana Tirinzoni 🔨	2	0	0	2	0	2	0	1	7
(Germany) Daniela Jentsch	0	1	2	0	1	0	2	0	6

==== Final ====
Monday, September 2, 12:30

Sheet 3	1	2	3	4	5	6	7	8	Final
(Scotland) Eve Muirhead	0	1	0	0	4	0	0	X	5
(Switzerland) Silvana Tirinzoni 🔨	0	0	0	1	0	1	0	X	2
