= 2017 Canadian Junior Curling Championships – Men's tournament =

2017 Canadian Junior Curling Championships Men's tournament
- Host city: Esquimalt, British Columbia
- Arena: Archie Browning Sports Centre; Esquimalt Curling Club
- Dates: January 21–29
- Winner: British Columbia
- Curling club: Langley Curling Club, Langley & Royal City Curling Club, New Westminster
- Skip: Tyler Tardi
- Third: Sterling Middleton
- Second: Jordan Tardi
- Lead: Nicholas Meister
- Coach: Paul Tardi
- Finalist: Ontario (Matthew Hall)

The men's tournament of the 2017 M&M Meat Shops Canadian Junior Curling Championships was held from January 21 to 29 at the Archie Browning Sports Centre and the Esquimalt Curling Club.

== Teams ==
The teams are listed as follows:

Province	Skip	Third	Second	Lead	Club(s)
Alberta	Colton Goller	Tyler Lautner	Kurtis Goller	Nicholas Rabl	Calgary Winter Club, Calgary
British Columbia	Tyler Tardi	Sterling Middleton	Jordan Tardi	Nicholas Meister	Langley Curling Club, Langley / Royal City Curling Club, New Westminster
Manitoba	JT Ryan	Jacques Gauthier	Graham McFarlane	Brendan Bilawka	Assiniboine Memorial Curling Club, Winnipeg
New Brunswick	Liam Marin	Carter Small	Felipe K. Marin	James Kyle	Thistle St. Andrews Curling Club, Saint John
Newfoundland and Labrador	Greg Blyde	Liam Gregory	Ian Withycombe	Connor Stapleton	RE/MAX Centre, St. John's
Northwest Territories	Sawer Kaeser	Tristan MacPherson	Joe Sturgeon	Garrett Minute	Fort Smith Curling Club, Fort Smith
Northern Ontario	Tanner Horgan	Jacob Horgan	Nicholas Bissonnette	Maxime Blais	Copper Cliff Curling Club, Sudbury
Nova Scotia	Matthew Manuel	Adam Cocks	Nick Zachernuk	Alec Cameron	Mayflower Curling Club, Halifax
Nunavut	Arthur Siksik	Tyson Komaksiutiksak	Javen Komaksiutiksak	David Aglukark	Qavik Curling Club, Rankin Inlet
Ontario	Matthew Hall	Jeff Wanless	Joey Hart	David Hart	Westmount Golf & Country Club, Kitchener
Prince Edward Island	Tyler Smith	Christopher Gallant	Noah O'Connor	Brooks Roche	Charlottetown Curling Complex, Charlottetown
Saskatchewan	Rylan Kleiter	Trevor Johnson	Joshua Mattern	Matthieu Taillon	Sutherland Curling Club, Saskatoon
Quebec	Vincent Roberge	Julien Tremblay	Étienne Elmaleh	Fabien Roberge	Club de curling Etchemin, Saint-Romuald / Club de curling Rimouski, Rimouski
Yukon	No team				

== Round-robin standings ==
Key
Teams to Championship Pool
Teams to Tie-Breakers

Pool A	Skip	W	L
Manitoba	JT Ryan	6	0
Prince Edward Island	Tyler Smith	4	2
Alberta	Colton Goller	4	2
New Brunswick	Liam Marin	3	3
Quebec	Vincent Roberge	2	4
Newfoundland and Labrador	Greg Blyde	2	4
Northwest Territories	Sawer Kaeser	0	6

Pool B	Skip	W	L
British Columbia	Tyler Tardi	4	1
Ontario	Matthew Hall	3	2
Northern Ontario	Tanner Horgan	3	2
Nova Scotia	Matthew Manuel	3	2
Saskatchewan	Rylan Kleiter	2	3
Nunavut	Arthur Siksik	0	5

== Round-robin results ==
All draw times are listed in Eastern Standard Time (UTC−5:00).

=== Pool A ===
==== Draw 1 ====
Sheet B	1	2	3	4	5	6	7	8	9	10	Final
Manitoba (Ryan)	1	0	2	0	0	0	2	0	3	X	8
Newfoundland and Labrador (Blyde) 🔨	0	0	0	2	0	2	0	1	0	X	5

Sheet E	1	2	3	4	5	6	7	8	9	10	Final
Quebec (Roberge)	0	1	0	0	1	0	1	0	2	X	5
Prince Edward Island (Smith) 🔨	1	0	2	1	0	2	0	1	0	X	7

Sheet I	1	2	3	4	5	6	7	8	9	10	Final
Alberta (Goller)	0	3	4	1	1	0	3	0	X	X	12
Northwest Territories (Kaeser) 🔨	1	0	0	0	0	1	0	1	X	X	3

==== Draw 2 ====
Sheet D	1	2	3	4	5	6	7	8	9	10	Final
Prince Edward Island (Smith)	0	1	0	1	0	0	0	1	0	X	3
New Brunswick (Marin) 🔨	1	0	2	0	0	2	1	0	2	X	8

Sheet F	1	2	3	4	5	6	7	8	9	10	Final
Newfoundland and Labrador (Blyde) 🔨	1	0	0	0	1	1	0	1	0	0	4
Alberta (Goller)	0	0	2	0	0	0	2	0	1	2	7

==== Draw 3 ====
Sheet B	1	2	3	4	5	6	7	8	9	10	Final
New Brunswick (Marin)	0	0	0	0	1	0	3	0	1	X	5
Quebec (Roberge) 🔨	0	0	1	1	0	1	0	0	0	X	3

Sheet E	1	2	3	4	5	6	7	8	9	10	Final
Northwest Territories (Kaeser)	0	0	0	1	0	1	0	0	X	X	2
Manitoba (Ryan) 🔨	3	2	2	0	3	0	6	1	X	X	17

==== Draw 4 ====
Sheet C	1	2	3	4	5	6	7	8	9	10	Final
Quebec (Roberge) 🔨	1	0	1	0	0	0	2	0	0	X	4
Alberta (Goller)	0	2	0	1	1	1	0	1	1	X	7

Sheet H	1	2	3	4	5	6	7	8	9	10	Final
Prince Edward Island (Smith) 🔨	2	1	4	0	2	6	1	0	X	X	16
Northwest Territories (Kaeser)	0	0	0	1	0	0	0	1	X	X	2

Sheet I	1	2	3	4	5	6	7	8	9	10	Final
New Brunswick (Marin)	1	0	1	0	0	1	0	0	2	0	5
Newfoundland and Labrador (Blyde) 🔨	0	3	0	1	1	0	0	2	0	2	9

==== Draw 5 ====
Sheet A	1	2	3	4	5	6	7	8	9	10	Final
Newfoundland and Labrador (Blyde)	0	0	1	0	0	1	0	0	1	0	3
Prince Edward Island (Smith) 🔨	1	0	0	1	0	0	0	1	0	1	4

Sheet D	1	2	3	4	5	6	7	8	9	10	Final
Alberta (Goller)	0	0	0	0	0	2	0	0	1	0	3
Manitoba (Ryan) 🔨	0	0	0	2	0	0	0	1	0	1	4

==== Draw 6 ====
Sheet C	1	2	3	4	5	6	7	8	9	10	Final
Northwest Territories (Kaeser)	0	0	1	0	1	0	1	0	0	X	3
New Brunswick (Marin) 🔨	2	0	0	2	0	1	0	2	2	X	9

Sheet G	1	2	3	4	5	6	7	8	9	10	11	Final
Manitoba (Ryan) 🔨	1	0	2	0	0	0	0	3	0	0	3	9
Quebec (Roberge)	0	1	0	1	1	1	0	0	1	1	0	6

==== Draw 7 ====
Sheet B	1	2	3	4	5	6	7	8	9	10	Final
Alberta (Goller) 🔨	2	0	0	1	0	2	1	0	0	0	6
Prince Edward Island (Smith)	0	1	2	0	2	0	0	1	1	2	9

Sheet H	1	2	3	4	5	6	7	8	9	10	Final
Quebec (Roberge)	0	2	0	1	0	0	0	3	0	1	7
Newfoundland and Labrador (Blyde) 🔨	1	0	2	0	1	0	0	0	2	0	6

==== Draw 9 ====
Sheet D	1	2	3	4	5	6	7	8	9	10	Final
Newfoundland and Labrador (Blyde) 🔨	1	0	0	2	1	0	0	1	0	2	7
Northwest Territories (Kaeser)	0	1	1	0	0	1	1	0	1	0	5

Sheet G	1	2	3	4	5	6	7	8	9	10	Final
New Brunswick (Marin)	0	1	0	2	0	1	2	0	X	X	6
Alberta (Goller) 🔨	1	0	2	0	6	0	0	2	X	X	11

Sheet I	1	2	3	4	5	6	7	8	9	10	Final
Prince Edward Island (Smith)	0	1	0	1	1	1	1	0	0	0	5
Manitoba (Ryan) 🔨	1	0	2	0	0	0	0	1	2	1	7

==== Draw 10 ====
Sheet A	1	2	3	4	5	6	7	8	9	10	Final
Manitoba (Ryan) 🔨	3	0	0	2	0	2	0	0	0	1	8
New Brunswick (Marin)	0	0	2	0	3	0	1	1	0	0	7

Sheet F	1	2	3	4	5	6	7	8	9	10	Final
Northwest Territories (Kaeser)	0	0	0	0	0	0	1	0	X	X	1
Quebec (Roberge) 🔨	3	0	1	1	3	2	0	0	X	X	10

=== Pool B ===
==== Draw 1 ====
Sheet C	1	2	3	4	5	6	7	8	9	10	Final
Saskatchewan (Kleiter) 🔨	0	0	0	1	1	0	1	0	0	0	3
Nova Scotia (Manuel)	0	0	1	0	0	2	0	2	1	3	9

==== Draw 2 ====
Sheet E	1	2	3	4	5	6	7	8	9	10	Final
Nunavut (Siksik)	0	0	0	0	0	0	0	0	X	X	0
Saskatchewan (Kleiter) 🔨	4	0	1	3	2	1	2	1	X	X	14

Sheet H	1	2	3	4	5	6	7	8	9	10	Final
Nova Scotia (Manuel)	0	1	0	1	0	2	0	0	0	X	4
Northern Ontario (Horgan) 🔨	1	0	1	0	2	0	0	3	1	X	8

==== Draw 3 ====
Sheet A	1	2	3	4	5	6	7	8	9	10	Final
Northern Ontario (Horgan)	1	0	0	0	1	0	0	2	0	X	4
Ontario (Hall) 🔨	0	0	1	0	0	0	2	0	4	X	7

Sheet F	1	2	3	4	5	6	7	8	9	10	Final
British Columbia (Tardi) 🔨	3	4	2	0	1	1	1	1	X	X	13
Nunavut (Siksik)	0	0	0	1	0	0	0	0	X	X	1

==== Draw 4 ====
Sheet D	1	2	3	4	5	6	7	8	9	10	Final
Saskatchewan (Kleiter)	2	0	0	1	0	2	0	0	0	X	5
Ontario (Hall) 🔨	0	2	0	0	2	0	3	2	1	X	10

==== Draw 5 ====
Sheet B	1	2	3	4	5	6	7	8	9	10	11	Final
British Columbia (Tardi) 🔨	0	2	0	3	0	0	0	0	1	0	1	7
Nova Scotia (Manuel)	0	0	3	0	0	0	1	1	0	1	0	6

Sheet F	1	2	3	4	5	6	7	8	9	10	Final
Northern Ontario (Horgan) 🔨	1	0	0	2	1	0	0	0	3	X	7
Saskatchewan (Kleiter)	0	0	1	0	0	1	0	1	0	X	3

==== Draw 6 ====
Sheet D	1	2	3	4	5	6	7	8	9	10	Final
Nunavut (Siksik)	0	1	2	0	0	1	0	0	X	X	4
Northern Ontario (Horgan) 🔨	3	0	0	2	3	0	4	0	X	X	12

Sheet E	1	2	3	4	5	6	7	8	9	10	Final
Ontario (Hall) 🔨	2	0	0	0	0	0	0	1	1	0	4
British Columbia (Tardi)	0	2	0	0	0	1	1	0	0	1	5

==== Draw 7 ====
Sheet G	1	2	3	4	5	6	7	8	9	10	Final
Ontario (Hall) 🔨	0	0	2	0	0	2	0	0	1	0	5
Nova Scotia (Manuel)	0	0	0	0	1	0	0	3	0	2	6

==== Draw 8 ====
Sheet C	1	2	3	4	5	6	7	8	9	10	Final
Northern Ontario (Horgan)	0	0	1	0	0	1	0	1	1	0	4
British Columbia (Tardi) 🔨	1	1	0	0	2	0	1	0	0	0	5

==== Draw 9 ====
Sheet A	1	2	3	4	5	6	7	8	9	10	Final
Nova Scotia (Manuel) 🔨	4	2	0	3	1	2	2	0	X	X	14
Nunavut (Siksik)	0	0	1	0	0	0	0	1	X	X	2

==== Draw 10 ====
Sheet H	1	2	3	4	5	6	7	8	9	10	Final
British Columbia (Tardi)	0	0	1	0	2	0	0	1	0	0	4
Saskatchewan (Kleiter) 🔨	0	2	0	2	0	1	1	0	1	0	7

Sheet I	1	2	3	4	5	6	7	8	9	10	Final
Nunavut (Siksik)	0	1	0	0	0	0	0	0	X	X	1
Ontario (Hall) 🔨	5	0	1	0	2	3	2	0	X	X	13

== Placement Round ==
=== Seeding Pool ===
==== Standings ====
Team	Skip	W	L
Newfoundland and Labrador	Greg Blyde	4	0
Quebec	Vincent Roberge	3	1
Saskatchewan	Rylan Kleiter	2	2
Northwest Territories	Sawer Kaeser	1	3
Nunavut	Arthur Siksik	0	4

==== Draw 12 ====
Sheet D	1	2	3	4	5	6	7	8	9	10	Final
Newfoundland and Labrador (Blyde) 🔨	3	4	1	1	1	1	0	1	X	X	12
Nunavut (Siksik)	0	0	0	0	0	0	1	0	X	X	1

Sheet H	1	2	3	4	5	6	7	8	9	10	Final
Quebec (Roberge) 🔨	1	2	2	0	4	0	0	3	X	X	12
Northwest Territories (Kaeser)	0	0	0	1	0	1	0	0	X	X	2

==== Draw 13 ====
Sheet A	1	2	3	4	5	6	7	8	9	10	Final
Quebec (Roberge) 🔨	1	0	0	3	0	1	0	0	0	0	5
Newfoundland and Labrador (Blyde)	0	1	0	0	1	0	1	1	1	1	6

Sheet C	1	2	3	4	5	6	7	8	9	10	Final
Northwest Territories (Kaeser)	0	0	0	0	0	1	0	0	X	X	1
Saskatchewan (Kleiter) 🔨	2	3	3	2	2	0	1	1	X	X	14

==== Draw 14 ====
Sheet A	1	2	3	4	5	6	7	8	9	10	Final
Northwest Territories (Kaeser) 🔨	3	2	2	0	0	3	0	0	0	1	11
Nunavut (Siksik)	0	0	0	1	0	0	3	1	2	0	7

Sheet D	1	2	3	4	5	6	7	8	9	10	Final
Saskatchewan (Kleiter)	1	0	1	0	0	1	1	0	X	X	4
Quebec (Roberge) 🔨	0	4	0	4	0	0	0	4	X	X	12

==== Draw 15 ====
Sheet G	1	2	3	4	5	6	7	8	9	10	Final
Newfoundland and Labrador (Blyde) 🔨	0	5	1	0	2	0	0	1	X	X	9
Northwest Territories	1	0	0	1	0	0	1	0	X	X	3

Sheet H	1	2	3	4	5	6	7	8	9	10	Final
Nunavut (Siksik)	0	0	0	1	0	0	1	0	X	X	2
Saskatchewan (Kleiter) 🔨	5	4	1	0	0	1	0	2	X	X	13

==== Draw 16 ====
Sheet E	1	2	3	4	5	6	7	8	9	10	Final
Nunavut (Siksik)	0	0	1	0	1	0	0	2	X	X	4
Quebec (Roberge) 🔨	1	5	0	2	0	1	3	0	X	X	12

==== Draw 17 ====
Sheet E	1	2	3	4	5	6	7	8	9	10	Final
Saskatchewan (Kleiter) 🔨	1	0	1	0	0	1	0	0	0	X	3
Newfoundland and Labrador (Blyde)	0	1	0	2	2	0	4	0	2	X	11

=== Championship Pool ===
==== Championship Pool Standings ====
After Round-robin standings

Key
Teams to Championship Pool
Teams to Tie-Breakers

Province	Skip	W	L
British Columbia	Tyler Tardi	7	0
Northern Ontario	Tanner Horgan	5	2
Ontario	Matthew Hall	4	3
Manitoba	JT Ryan	4	3
Nova Scotia	Matthew Manuel	3	4
Prince Edward Island	Tyler Smith	2	5
Alberta	Colton Goller	2	5
New Brunswick	Liam Marin	1	6

==== Draw 12 ====
Sheet B	1	2	3	4	5	6	7	8	9	10	Final
Manitoba (Ryan) 🔨	1	1	0	1	0	1	0	1	0	X	5
Northern Ontario (Horgan)	0	0	3	0	1	0	2	0	1	X	7

Sheet F	1	2	3	4	5	6	7	8	9	10	Final
Ontario (Hall) 🔨	0	0	2	0	1	0	0	3	0	X	6
Alberta (Goller)	0	0	0	1	0	0	1	0	1	X	3

==== Draw 13 ====
Sheet E	1	2	3	4	5	6	7	8	9	10	Final
Prince Edward Island (Smith) 🔨	0	0	1	0	0	0	0	1	X	X	2
Nova Scotia (Manuel)	0	0	0	3	4	2	0	0	X	X	9

Sheet H	1	2	3	4	5	6	7	8	9	10	Final
British Columbia (Tardi) 🔨	0	0	4	2	0	2	0	0	X	X	8
New Brunswick (Marin)	0	0	0	0	1	0	1	1	X	X	3

==== Draw 14 ====
Sheet C	1	2	3	4	5	6	7	8	9	10	Final
Alberta (Goller)	0	1	1	0	3	0	2	0	1	X	8
British Columbia (Tardi) 🔨	2	0	0	3	0	2	0	4	0	X	11

Sheet E	1	2	3	4	5	6	7	8	9	10	Final
New Brunswick (Marin) 🔨	2	1	0	0	0	0	0	1	0	X	4
Ontario (Hall)	0	0	2	1	2	2	0	0	2	X	9

Sheet F	1	2	3	4	5	6	7	8	9	10	Final
Nova Scotia (Manuel)	0	1	0	1	0	2	1	0	0	0	5
Manitoba (Ryan) 🔨	0	0	3	0	2	0	0	1	0	1	7

==== Draw 15 ====
Sheet A	1	2	3	4	5	6	7	8	9	10	Final
New Brunswick (Marin)	0	2	0	0	0	0	0	2	0	X	4
Nova Scotia (Manuel) 🔨	0	0	2	1	0	2	2	0	1	X	8

Sheet I	1	2	3	4	5	6	7	8	9	10	Final
Northern Ontario (Horgan) 🔨	2	0	1	0	1	2	0	2	X	X	8
Prince Edward Island (Smith)	0	1	0	1	0	0	1	0	X	X	3

==== Draw 16 ====
Sheet D	1	2	3	4	5	6	7	8	9	10	Final
Alberta (Goller)	0	2	0	0	0	0	1	0	1	X	4
Northern Ontario (Horgan) 🔨	4	0	0	0	0	2	0	1	0	X	7

Sheet G	1	2	3	4	5	6	7	8	9	10	Final
British Columbia (Tardi)	1	1	0	3	3	0	0	1	X	X	9
Prince Edward Island (Smith) 🔨	0	0	1	0	0	1	1	0	X	X	3

Sheet H	1	2	3	4	5	6	7	8	9	10	Final
Ontario (Hall) 🔨	2	0	0	0	1	1	1	0	0	1	6
Manitoba (Ryan)	0	0	0	2	0	0	0	0	3	0	5

==== Draw 17 ====
Sheet A	1	2	3	4	5	6	7	8	9	10	Final
Manitoba (Ryan)	0	3	1	0	1	1	0	0	1	X	7
British Columbia (Tardi) 🔨	3	0	0	3	0	0	1	2	0	X	9

Sheet B	1	2	3	4	5	6	7	8	9	10	Final
Prince Edward Island (Smith)	0	0	0	1	0	0	2	0	0	2	5
Ontario (Hall) 🔨	0	0	0	0	3	0	0	0	1	0	4

Sheet F	1	2	3	4	5	6	7	8	9	10	Final
Northern Ontario (Horgan)	1	0	0	1	0	1	1	2	0	X	6
New Brunswick (Marin) 🔨	0	0	1	0	1	0	0	0	1	X	3

Sheet I	1	2	3	4	5	6	7	8	9	10	11	Final
Nova Scotia (Manuel)	0	0	0	1	1	0	0	1	0	1	0	4
Alberta (Goller) 🔨	1	1	0	0	0	1	0	0	1	0	2	6

== Tiebreaker ==
Sheet C	1	2	3	4	5	6	7	8	9	10	11	Final
Manitoba (Ryan)	0	0	2	0	2	0	2	0	0	1	0	7
Ontario (Hall) 🔨	0	3	0	1	0	0	0	2	1	0	1	8

=== Playoffs ===
Semifinal			Final
			1	British Columbia	9
2	Northern Ontario	6	3	Ontario	7
3	Ontario	7

=== Semifinal ===
Sheet C	1	2	3	4	5	6	7	8	9	10	11	Final
Northern Ontario (Horgan) 🔨	1	0	2	0	0	0	0	1	0	2	0	6
Ontario (Hall)	0	1	0	0	0	0	4	0	1	0	1	7

Player percentages
Northern Ontario		Ontario	
Maxime Blais	82%	David Hart	89%
Nicholas Bissonette	94%	Joey Hart	89%
Jacob Horgan	88%	Jeff Wanless	92%
Tanner Horgan	75%	Matthew Hall	83%
Total	85%	Total	88%

=== Final ===
Sheet C	1	2	3	4	5	6	7	8	9	10	Final
British Columbia (Tardi) 🔨	0	2	0	1	1	0	0	4	0	1	9
Ontario (Hall)	0	0	1	0	0	2	2	0	2	0	7

Player percentages
British Columbia		Ontario	
Nicholas Meister	96%	David Hart	89%
Jordan Tardi	73%	Joey Hart	84%
Sterling Middleton	94%	Jeff Wanless	75%
Tyler Tardi	85%	Matthew Hall	81%
Total	84%	Total	82%
