= 2020 Ontario Tankard =

- Host city: Cornwall, Ontario
- Arena: Ed Lumley Arena
- Dates: January 28 – February 2
- Winner: Team Epping
- Curling club: Leaside Curling Club, Toronto
- Skip: John Epping
- Third: Ryan Fry
- Second: Mathew Camm
- Lead: Brent Laing
- Coach: Jim Wilson
- Finalist: Glenn Howard

The 2020 Ontario Tankard, the provincial men's curling championship for Southern Ontario, was held from January 28 to February 2 at the Ed Lumley Arena in Cornwall, Ontario. The winning John Epping rink represented Ontario at the 2020 Tim Hortons Brier in Kingston, Ontario. The event was held in conjunction with the 2020 Ontario Scotties Tournament of Hearts, the women's provincial championship.

John Epping won his second Ontario Tankard by defeating Glenn Howard 8–3 in the final.

== Qualification process ==
Nine teams qualified from two cash spiels (two each), an open qualifier (two teams), plus the top two southern Ontario teams in the CTRS standings (as of December 1, 2019). Originally the event was to have just eight teams, but CurlON decided on December 9, 2019 to expand the field to nine teams with the addition of one team qualifying through their CTRS ranking. This is a reduction from the ten teams which played in the 2019 Tankard, making the number of entries equal to the provincial Scotties.

Qualification method	Berths	Qualifying team
CTRS leaders	3	John Epping; Scott McDonald; Glenn Howard
Cash Spiel #1	2	John Willsey; Pat Ferris
Cash Spiel #2	2	Jason Camm; Steve Allen
Open Qualifier	2	Mark Kean; Matthew Hall

== Teams ==
The team lineups were as follows:

Skip	Third	Second	Lead	Alternate	Club(s)
Steve Allen	Ritchie Gillan	Rick Allen	Kevin Rathwell	Cameron Goodkey	Ottawa Curling Club, Ottawa
Jason Camm	Jordie Lyon-Hatcher	Kurt Armstrong	Brett Lyon-Hatcher		Navan Curling Club, Navan, Ottawa
John Epping	Ryan Fry	Mathew Camm	Brent Laing		Leaside Curling Club, East York, Toronto
Pat Ferris	Ian Dickie	Connor Duhaime	Zachary Shurtleff		Grimsby Curling Club, Grimsby
Matthew Hall	Alex Champ	Terry Arnold	Scott Clinton		Westmount Golf & Curling Club, Kitchener
Glenn Howard	Scott Howard	David Mathers	Tim March	Adam Spencer	Penetanguishene Curling Club, Penetanguishene
Mark Kean	Charlie Richard	Tyler Twining	David Ronaldson	Chris Jay	Woodstock Curling Club, Woodstock
Scott McDonald	Jonathan Beuk	Wesley Forget	Scott Chadwick		Cataraqui Golf and Country Club, Kingston
John Willsey	Connor Lawes	Robert Currie	Evan Lilly		KW Granite Club, Waterloo

== Round-robin standings ==
Final round-robin standings

Key
Teams to Playoffs
Teams to Tiebreaker

Skip (Club)	W	L	PF	PA	Ends Won	Ends Lost	Blank Ends	Stolen Ends
John Epping (Leaside)	8	0	65	38	37	30	3	8
Glenn Howard (Penetanguishene)	6	2	58	50	34	29	10	7
Scott McDonald (Cataraqui)	5	3	65	52	37	31	6	7
Matthew Hall (Westmount)	5	3	61	55	36	33	2	8
John Willsey (KW Granite)	4	4	45	56	34	35	3	5
Pat Ferris (Grimsby)	3	5	48	58	29	35	6	5
Steve Allen (Ottawa)	2	6	47	50	35	31	4	11
Jason Camm (Navan)	2	6	50	53	30	34	8	6
Mark Kean (Woodstock)	1	7	35	62	22	36	7	4

== Round-robin results ==
All draws are listed in Eastern Time (UTC−05:00).

=== Draw 1 ===
Monday, January 27, 8:00 pm

Sheet A	1	2	3	4	5	6	7	8	9	10	Final
John Willsey	0	0	2	0	1	0	1	0	0	X	4
Glenn Howard 🔨	0	1	0	1	0	2	0	0	2	X	6

Sheet B	1	2	3	4	5	6	7	8	9	10	Final
Scott McDonald	0	0	2	0	1	0	1	1	0	0	5
Jason Camm 🔨	1	0	0	2	0	2	0	0	2	1	8

Sheet C	1	2	3	4	5	6	7	8	9	10	Final
John Epping 🔨	1	3	0	0	2	0	2	0	X	X	8
Steve Allen	0	0	1	1	0	1	0	1	X	X	4

Sheet D	1	2	3	4	5	6	7	8	9	10	Final
Mark Kean	0	1	1	0	1	0	1	0	X	X	4
Pat Ferris 🔨	2	0	0	1	0	2	0	4	X	X	9

=== Draw 2 ===
Tuesday, January 28, 12:15 pm

Sheet A	1	2	3	4	5	6	7	8	9	10	Final
Pat Ferris 🔨	2	0	1	0	0	0	1	0	1	0	5
John Epping	0	3	0	0	0	2	0	1	0	1	7

Sheet B	1	2	3	4	5	6	7	8	9	10	Final
Steve Allen	0	1	1	0	0	1	0	1	1	0	5
Matthew Hall 🔨	2	0	0	2	1	0	1	0	0	1	7

Sheet C	1	2	3	4	5	6	7	8	9	10	Final
John Willsey	0	0	1	0	2	0	1	0	1	1	6
Mark Kean 🔨	0	0	0	2	0	2	0	1	0	0	5

Sheet D	1	2	3	4	5	6	7	8	9	10	Final
Glenn Howard 🔨	2	0	0	3	0	1	0	2	0	X	8
Scott McDonald	0	3	1	0	2	0	3	0	2	X	11

=== Draw 3 ===
Tuesday, January 28, 8:00 pm

Sheet A	1	2	3	4	5	6	7	8	9	10	Final
Mark Kean 🔨	1	2	0	1	2	0	3	X	X	X	9
Scott McDonald	0	0	3	0	0	1	0	X	X	X	4

Sheet B	1	2	3	4	5	6	7	8	9	10	Final
John Willsey	0	1	0	1	0	2	0	X	X	X	4
John Epping 🔨	2	0	1	0	3	0	4	X	X	X	10

Sheet C	1	2	3	4	5	6	7	8	9	10	Final
Jason Camm 🔨	1	0	0	2	0	0	0	1	0	X	4
Glenn Howard	0	0	1	0	4	0	0	0	1	X	6

Sheet D	1	2	3	4	5	6	7	8	9	10	Final
Matthew Hall 🔨	2	0	1	0	1	1	0	1	4	X	10
Pat Ferris	0	0	0	3	0	0	1	0	0	X	4

=== Draw 4 ===
Wednesday, January 29, 8:30 am

Sheet A	1	2	3	4	5	6	7	8	9	10	11	Final
John Willsey 🔨	2	0	1	0	0	1	0	2	0	0	1	7
Scott McDonald	0	1	0	1	1	0	2	0	0	1	0	6

Sheet B	1	2	3	4	5	6	7	8	9	10	Final
Mark Kean	0	2	0	3	0	0	2	0	0	0	7
Matthew Hall 🔨	1	0	1	0	4	0	0	2	0	2	10

Sheet C	1	2	3	4	5	6	7	8	9	10	11	Final
Pat Ferris 🔨	3	0	0	0	2	0	1	0	2	0	1	9
Jason Camm	0	2	0	1	0	1	0	3	0	1	0	8

Sheet D	1	2	3	4	5	6	7	8	9	10	Final
Glenn Howard 🔨	0	0	2	0	0	2	1	0	0	X	5
Steve Allen	0	1	0	1	1	0	0	1	0	X	4

=== Draw 5 ===
Wednesday, January 29, 4:00 pm

Sheet A	1	2	3	4	5	6	7	8	9	10	Final
John Epping 🔨	2	0	1	0	2	0	1	0	1	0	7
Matthew Hall	0	1	0	1	0	1	0	2	0	1	6

Sheet B	1	2	3	4	5	6	7	8	9	10	Final
Glenn Howard 🔨	0	1	2	2	0	2	0	2	0	1	10
Pat Ferris	0	0	0	0	3	0	2	0	2	0	7

Sheet C	1	2	3	4	5	6	7	8	9	10	Final
Mark Kean	1	0	1	0	0	0	4	0	0	2	8
Steve Allen 🔨	0	2	0	2	1	1	0	1	0	0	7

Sheet D	1	2	3	4	5	6	7	8	9	10	11	Final
John Willsey 🔨	0	2	0	1	0	1	1	0	3	0	1	9
Jason Camm	1	0	2	0	2	0	0	1	0	2	0	8

=== Draw 6 ===
Thursday, January 30, 12:15 pm

Sheet A	1	2	3	4	5	6	7	8	9	10	Final
Glenn Howard 🔨	1	2	0	0	0	0	0	2	0	1	6
Mark Kean	0	0	2	1	0	0	0	0	1	0	4

Sheet B	1	2	3	4	5	6	7	8	9	10	Final
John Willsey	0	0	3	0	0	1	0	1	0	1	6
Steve Allen 🔨	0	1	0	1	0	0	1	0	1	0	4

Sheet C	1	2	3	4	5	6	7	8	9	10	Final
Scott McDonald 🔨	0	2	0	1	0	3	0	3	X	X	9
Matthew Hall	0	0	1	0	1	0	2	0	X	X	4

Sheet D	1	2	3	4	5	6	7	8	9	10	Final
John Epping	1	1	0	1	0	1	0	0	0	1	5
Jason Camm 🔨	0	0	2	0	1	0	0	0	1	0	4

=== Draw 7 ===
Thursday, January 30, 7:45 pm

Sheet A	1	2	3	4	5	6	7	8	9	10	Final
Jason Camm 🔨	2	0	0	2	0	1	0	0	0	0	5
Matthew Hall	0	1	2	0	2	0	0	2	0	2	9

Sheet B	1	2	3	4	5	6	7	8	9	10	Final
John Epping	1	0	2	1	0	3	0	2	X	X	9
Glenn Howard 🔨	0	1	0	0	2	0	2	0	X	X	5

Sheet C	1	2	3	4	5	6	7	8	9	10	Final
John Willsey 🔨	1	0	0	0	0	0	1	1	0	X	3
Pat Ferris	0	1	1	1	1	2	0	0	1	X	7

Sheet D	1	2	3	4	5	6	7	8	9	10	11	Final
Scott McDonald 🔨	2	0	2	0	1	0	0	2	0	0	1	8
Steve Allen	0	2	0	1	0	2	0	0	0	2	0	7

=== Draw 8 ===
Friday, January 31, 12:15 pm

Sheet A	1	2	3	4	5	6	7	8	9	10	Final
Pat Ferris 🔨	0	0	0	1	0	0	2	0	0	X	3
Steve Allen	0	2	0	0	0	2	0	1	2	X	7

Sheet B	1	2	3	4	5	6	7	8	9	10	Final
Mark Kean	1	0	0	0	0	X	X	X	X	X	1
Jason Camm 🔨	0	2	4	2	0	X	X	X	X	X	8

Sheet C	1	2	3	4	5	6	7	8	9	10	11	Final
John Epping	3	0	2	0	0	1	0	2	0	0	2	10
Scott McDonald 🔨	0	1	0	1	2	0	1	0	2	1	0	8

Sheet D	1	2	3	4	5	6	7	8	9	10	Final
John Willsey 🔨	0	1	0	1	0	1	1	0	2	X	6
Matthew Hall	2	0	2	0	3	0	0	1	0	X	8

=== Draw 9 ===
Friday, January 31, 7:45 pm

Sheet A	1	2	3	4	5	6	7	8	9	10	Final
Steve Allen 🔨	2	0	0	3	0	1	0	1	2	X	9
Jason Camm	0	2	2	0	0	0	1	0	0	X	5

Sheet B	1	2	3	4	5	6	7	8	9	10	Final
Pat Ferris	2	0	0	1	0	1	0	0	X	X	4
Scott McDonald 🔨	0	4	0	0	2	0	0	3	X	X	9

Sheet C	1	2	3	4	5	6	7	8	9	10	Final
Glenn Howard 🔨	1	0	3	3	0	1	0	2	2	X	12
Matthew Hall	0	2	0	0	3	0	2	0	0	X	7

Sheet D	1	2	3	4	5	6	7	8	9	10	Final
Mark Kean	0	0	0	1	0	1	0	0	X	X	2
John Epping 🔨	0	1	2	0	1	0	3	2	X	X	9

=== Tiebreaker ===
Saturday, February 1, 8:00 am

Sheet A	1	2	3	4	5	6	7	8	9	10	Final
Matthew Hall	0	0	1	0	1	0	0	2	0	X	4
Scott McDonald 🔨	0	0	0	1	0	2	3	0	3	X	9

== Playoffs ==
Semifinal			Final
			1	John Epping	8
2	Glenn Howard	11	2	Glenn Howard	3
3	Scott McDonald	5

=== Semifinal ===
Saturday, February 1, 4:30 pm

Sheet B	1	2	3	4	5	6	7	8	9	10	Final
Glenn Howard 🔨	0	0	4	0	4	0	0	3	X	X	11
Scott McDonald	1	1	0	1	0	2	0	0	X	X	5

=== Final ===
Sunday, February 2, 1:00 pm

Sheet B	1	2	3	4	5	6	7	8	9	10	Final
John Epping 🔨	3	0	1	0	2	1	0	1	X	X	8
Glenn Howard	0	1	0	1	0	0	1	0	X	X	3

2020 Ontario Tankard

John Epping
2nd Ontario Provincial Championship title

== Qualification ==
=== Cash Spiel #1 ===
December 20–22, Guelph Curling Club, Guelph

A1 Event
Jason March (Royals)	9
Owen Purdy (Cataraqui)	10

Quarterfinals
Wayne Tuck Jr. (Wingham)	5
Tyler Stewart (Westmount)	8
Jason Camm (Navan)	1
Sam Mooibroek (Galt)	9
Pat Ferris (Grimsby)	10
Owen Purdy (Cataraqui)	2
Dayna Deruelle (Harriston)	8
Matthew Hall (Westmount)	6

Semifinals
Tyler Stewart (Westmount)	7
Sam Mooibroek (Galt)	2
Pat Ferris (Grimsby)	5
Dayna Deruelle (Harriston)	4

To Playoff
Tyler Stewart (Westmount)	6
Pat Ferris (Grimsby)	8

A2 Event
Rylan Hartley (Brantford)	5
Tyler Marshall (Coldwater)	2
Sam Steep (St. Catharines)	8
Travis Belchior (Welland)	4

Quarterfinals
John Willsey (KW Granite)	7
Rylan Hartley (Brantford)	5
Cameron Goodkey (Ottawa)	5
Steve Allen (Ottawa)	7
Mark Kean (Woodstock)	4
Sam Steep (St. Catharines)	6
Rob Ainsley (Royals)	8
Richard Krell (Unionville)	6

Semifinals
John Willsey (KW Granite)	6
Steve Allen (Ottawa)	7
Sam Steep (St. Catharines)	2
Rob Ainsley (Royals)	7

To Playoff
Steve Allen (Ottawa)	6
Rob Ainsley (Royals)	1

B1 Event
Jason March (Royals)	0
Matthew Hall (Westmount)	6

Quarterfinals
Jason Camm (Navan)	8
Owen Purdy (Cataraqui)	6
Wayne Tuck Jr. (Wingham)	6
Matthew Hall (Westmount)	5

Semifinals
Jason Camm (Navan)	4
Wayne Tuck Jr. (Wingham)	9

To Playoff
Wayne Tuck Jr. (Wingham)	3
Rob Ainsley (Royals)	7

B2 Event
Tyler Marshall (Coldwater)	6
Cameron Goodkey (Ottawa)	4
Travis Belchior (Welland)	5
Richard Krell (Unionville)	6

Quarterfinals
Mark Kean (Woodstock)	6
Tyler Marshall (Coldwater)	5
Rylan Hartley (Brantford)	2
Richard Krell (Unionville)	7

Semifinals
Mark Kean (Woodstock)	0
Richard Krell (Unionville)	5

To Playoff
Richard Krell (Unionville)	5
Tyler Stewart (Westmount)	7

B3 Event		To Playoff
Sam Mooibroek (Galt)	5
Dayna Deruelle (Harriston)	6	Dayna Deruelle (Harriston)	4
John Willsey (KW Granite)	6	Sam Steep (St. Catharines)	7
Sam Steep (St. Catharines)	8

C1 Event
Jason March (Royals)	5
Tyler Marshall (Coldwater)	2

Quarterfinals
Jason March (Royals)	4
Rylan Hartley (Brantford)	6

Semifinals
Rylan Hartley (Brantford)	2
John Willsey (KW Granite)	6

To Playoff
John Willsey (KW Granite)	7
Richard Krell (Unionville)	3

C2 Event		To Playoff
Jason Camm (Navan)	5
Mark Kean (Woodstock)	6	Mark Kean (Woodstock)	4
		Dayna Deruelle (Harriston)	8

C3 Event		Quarterfinals		Semifinals		To Playoff
				Sam Mooibroek (Galt)	3
Matthew Hall (Westmount)	4			Cameron Goodkey (Ottawa)	6
Cameron Goodkey (Ottawa)	5	Cameron Goodkey (Ottawa)	5
Owen Purdy (Cataraqui)	3	Travis Belchior (Welland)	1
Travis Belchior (Welland)	9					Cameron Goodkey (Ottawa)	5
						Wayne Tuck Jr. (Wingham)	6

Playoff Round
A1	Pat Ferris (Grimsby)	11
C3	Wayne Tuck Jr. (Wingham)	3
B2	Tyler Stewart (Westmount)	6
B3	Sam Steep (St. Catharines)	7

To Provincials
A1	Pat Ferris (Grimsby)	8
B3	Sam Steep (St. Catharines)	3

Playoff Round
A2	Steve Allen (Ottawa)	1
C1	John Willsey (KW Granite)	5
B1	Rob Ainsley (Royals)	3
C2	Dayna Deruelle (Harriston)	9

To Provincials
C1	John Willsey (KW Granite)	6
C2	Dayna Deruelle (Harriston)	0

=== Cash Spiel #2 ===
January 10–12, 2020, Quinte Curling Club, Belleville

A1 Event
Dave Collyer (Quinte)	7
Matthew Dupuis (Cornwall)	3

Quarterfinals
Dave Collyer (Quinte)	7
Wayne Tuck Jr. (Wingham)	3
Cory Heggestad (Stroud)	7
Matthew Hall (Westmount)	6
Rob Ainsley (Royals)	5
Brad Kidd (Peterborough)	2
Tyler Stewart (Westmount)	6
Jason March (Royals)	7

Semifinals
Dave Collyer (Quinte)	6
Cory Heggestad (Stroud)	7
Rob Ainsley (Royals)	5
Jason March (Royals)	6

To Playoff
Cory Heggestad (Stroud)	7
Jason March (Royals)	2

A2 Event
Dayna Deruelle (Harriston)	5
Pascal Michaud (Rideau)	4
Jason Camm (Navan)	7
Rylan Hartley (Brantford)	3
Cameron Goodkey (Ottawa)	11
Sam Steep (St. Catharines)	5
Steve Allen (Ottawa)	7
Robert Dickson (Napanee)	6

Semifinals
Dayna Deruelle (Harriston)	6
Jason Camm (Navan)	5
Cameron Goodkey (Ottawa)	4
Steve Allen (Ottawa)	5

To playoff
Dayna Deruelle (Harriston)	6
Steve Allen (Ottawa)	4

B1 Event
Matthew Dupuis (Cornwall)	9
Tyler Stewart (Westmount)	3

Quarterfinals
Wayne Tuck Jr. (Wingham)	6
Matthew Hall (Westmount)	5
Matthew Dupuis (Cornwall)	8
Brad Kidd (Peterborough)	6

Semifinals
Rob Ainsley (Royals)	8
Wayne Tuck Jr. (Wingham)	3
Matthew Dupuis (Cornwall)	4
Dave Collyer (Quinte)	6

To Playoff
Rob Ainsley (Royals)	5
Dave Collyer (Quinte)	4

B2 Event		Semifinals		To Playoff
		Pascal Michaud (Rideau)	6
Rylan Hartley (Brantford)	3	Cameron Goodkey (Ottawa)	2
Pascal Michaud (Rideau)	6			Steve Allen (Ottawa)	0
				Pascal Michaud (Rideau)	6

B3 Event		Semifinals		To Playoff
		Jason Camm (Navan)	7
Sam Steep (St. Catharines)	5	Robert Dickson (Napanee)	6
Robert Dickson (Napanee)	6			Jason Camm (Navan)	8
				Jason March (Royals)	7

C1 Event		Semifinals		To Playoff
		Matthew Dupuis (Cornwall)	3
Brad Kidd (Peterborough)	3	Matthew Hall (Westmount)	7
Matthew Hall (Westmount)	6			Matthew Hall (Westmount)	4
				Jason March (Royals)	6

C2 Event
Tyler Stewart (Westmount)	5
Sam Steep (St. Catharines)	3

Quarterfinals
Tyler Stewart (Westmount)	7
Rylan Hartley (Brantford)	3

Semifinals
Tyler Stewart (Westmount)	6
Robert Dickson (Napanee)	3

To Playoff
Steve Allen (Ottawa)	7
Tyler Stewart (Westmount)	2

C3 Event		To Playoff
Wayne Tuck Jr. (Wingham)	3
Cameron Goodkey (Ottawa)	5	Cameron Goodkey (Ottawa)	5
		Dave Collyer (Quinte)	4

Playoff Round
A1	Cory Heggestad (Stroud)	4
C3	Cameron Goodkey (Ottawa)	8
B1	Rob Ainsley (Royals)	6
B3	Jason Camm (Navan)	7

To Provincials
Cameron Goodkey (Ottawa)	5
Jason Camm (Navan)	6

Playoff Round
B2	Pascal Michaud (Rideau)	5
C1	Jason March (Royals)	6
C2	Steve Allen (Ottawa)	4
A2	Dayna Deruelle (Harriston)	3

To Provincials
Jason March (Royals)	2
Steve Allen (Ottawa)	6

=== Open qualifier ===
January 17–19, 2020, KW Granite Club, Waterloo

A Side
Damien Villard (Galt)	0
Matthew Hall (Westmount)	8
Matthew Mepstead (Oshawa)	4
Tyler Stewart (Westmount)	5
Jason March (Royals)	9
Sam Steep (St. Catharines)	5

Quarterfinals
Wayne Tuck Jr. (Wingham)	5
Matthew Hall (Westmount)	7
Dayna Deruelle (Harriston)	1
Tyler Stewart (Westmount)	10
Mark Kean (Woodstock)	7
Jason March (Royals)	3
Richard Krell (KW Granite)	7
Rob Ainsley (Royals)	1

Semifinals
Matthew Hall (Westmount)	8
Tyler Stewart (Westmount)	3
Mark Kean (Woodstock)	8
Richard Krell (KW Granite)	2

To Tankard
Matthew Hall (Westmount)	6
Mark Kean (Woodstock)	7

B Side
Damien Villard (Galt)	5
Sam Steep (St. Catharines)	6
Jason March (Royals)	7
Matthew Mepstead (Oshawa)	2
Rob Ainsley (Royals)	8
Wayne Tuck Jr. (Wingham)	2

Round of 16
Sam Steep (St. Catharines)	7
Jason March (Royals)	6
Dayna Deruelle (Harriston)	8
Rob Ainsley (Royals)	2

Quarterfinals
Richard Krell (KW Granite)	7
Sam Steep (St. Catharines)	5
Tyler Stewart (Westmount)	7
Dayna Deruelle (Harriston)	6

Semifinals
Richard Krell (KW Granite)	3
Tyler Stewart (Westmount)	8

To Tankard
Matthew Hall (Westmount)	7
Tyler Stewart (Westmount)	6
