= John Willsey =

Canadian curler

- Curler

Team
- Curling club: Coldwater CC, Coldwater, ON
- Skip: John Willsey
- Third: Brady Lumley
- Second: Matthew Garner
- Lead: Spencer Dunlop
- Mixed doubles partner: Sierra Sutherland

Curling career
- Member Association: Ontario
- Top CTRS ranking: 17th (2018–19)

John Willsey is a Canadian curler from Orillia, Ontario. He currently skips his own team out of Oakville, Ontario.

== Career ==
=== Youth ===
In 2012, Willsey won the Ontario Bantam Mixed championship, playing third for Sarah Nuhn.

While attending the University of Waterloo, Willsey skipped the Waterloo men's curling team for three of the four years on the team. In his first year on the team, he won a silver medal for Waterloo at the 2016 OUA championship and led Waterloo to a 2-5 record at the 2016 CIS/CCA Curling Championships, the national university championship. After winning a bronze medal at the OUA championship, he led Waterloo once again at the 2018 national university championship. There, Waterloo would finish the round robin in first place with a 5-2 record. In the playoffs however, Waterloo lost both of their games, and settled for fourth place. Willsey was named as a second team All-Canadian at the event. Following the event, Willsey was named OUA athlete of the week. After graduating from Waterloo, Willsey was awarded with the Warrior Shield of Excellence Award. In his fifth year of eligibility, beginning in 2019, Willsey began curling for Wilfrid Laurier University, playing third on the team, which was skipped by Matthew Hall. The team went on to win the 2020 U Sports/Curling Canada University Curling Championships for Laurier.

=== Men's ===
Following his strong run in university curling, Willsey and his rink of Connor Lawes, Robert Currie and Evan Lilly had a strong season on the 2018-19 World Curling Tour. The team won two tour events that season, the Stroud Sleeman Cash Spiel and the Huron ReproGraphics Oil Heritage Classic. The team finished the season in 17th place on the Canadian Team Ranking System.

Willsey and his rink was one of the two qualifying teams at the 2019 CurlON Men's Cash Spiel #1, which qualified his rink for the 2020 Ontario Tankard, Willsey's first men's provincial championship. At the Tankard, he led his rink to a 4–4 record, missing the playoffs.

Willsey would later form a team with Brady Lumley, Matthew Garner and Spencer Dunlop. The team won the 2022 St. Thomas Curling Classic, and their success on tour during the 2022–23 curling season qualified the rink for the 2023 Ontario Tankard.

== Personal life ==
Willsey attended Park Street Collegiate Institute, and then Orillia Secondary School. He is in the MBA program at Laurier. He took civil engineering while in Waterloo, Ontario.
