= 2020 U Sports/Curling Canada University Curling Championships =

- Host city: Portage la Prairie, Manitoba
- Arena: Stride Place
- Dates: March 11–15
- Men's winner: (Ontario) Wilfrid Laurier Golden Hawks
- Skip: Matthew Hall
- Third: John Willsey
- Second: Jordie Lyon-Hatcher
- Lead: Graham Singer
- Alternate: Adam Vincent
- Coach: Matthew Wilkinson
- Finalist: (Nova Scotia) Dalhousie Tigers (Manuel)
- Women's winner: Alberta Pandas
- Skip: Selena Sturmay
- Third: Abby Marks
- Second: Kate Goodhelpsen
- Lead: Paige Papley
- Alternate: Catherine Clifford
- Coach: Garry Coderre
- Finalist: (New Brunswick) UNB Reds (Comeau)

The 2020 U Sports/Curling Canada University Curling Championships were held from March 11 to 15, 2020 at Stride Place in Portage la Prairie, Manitoba. The winning teams on both the men's and women's sides will also represent Canada at the 2021 Winter Universiade in Lucerne, Switzerland.

The Wilfrid Laurier Golden Hawks skipped by Matthew Hall won the men's division, defeating the Dalhousie Tigers skipped by Matthew Manuel in the final. The team from the Wilfrid Laurier University went a perfect 9–0 throughout the tournament. The Alberta Golden Bears skipped by Karsten Sturmay took the bronze medal with a 11–6 victory over the Guelph Gryphons skipped by 2019 Canadian Under 18 champion skip Dylan Niepage. Sturmay won the championship in 2018 and won a silver medal at the 2019 Winter Universiade.

The Alberta Pandas skipped by Selena Sturmay were the women's champions, defeating the UNB Reds skipped by Justine Comeau in the final. The Sturmay rink won the 2019 Canadian Junior Curling Championships. In the bronze medal game, the Queen's Golden Gaels skipped by the 2016 Canadian Junior Curling Championships skip Mary Fay topped the McMaster Marauders 7–5.

== Men ==
=== Teams ===
The teams are listed as follows:

| Team | Skip | Third | Second | Lead | Alternate | University |
|---|---|---|---|---|---|---|
| Alberta Golden Bears | Karsten Sturmay | Chris Kennedy | Andrew Gittis | Glenn Venance | Desmond Young | University of Alberta |
| Brandon Bobcats | Mitchell Katcher | Taylor Holland | Josh Luce | Jeremy Katcher | | (Manitoba) Brandon University |
| Brock Badgers | Nick Lemieux | Dan Sawchuk | Dylan Sipura | John McCutcheon | Brian Reiger | (Ontario) Brock University |
| Dalhousie Tigers | Matthew Manuel | Owen Purcell | Jeff Meagher | Adam McEachren | | (Nova Scotia) Dalhousie University |
| Guelph Gryphons | Dylan Niepage | Nathan Marshall | Sam Guilbeault | Ryan Yee | Adam Mackay | (Ontario) University of Guelph |
| Memorial Sea-Hawks | Daniel Bruce | Ryan McNeil Lamswood | Greg Blyde | Ben Stringer | | (Newfoundland and Labrador) Memorial University of Newfoundland |
| Regina Cougars | Ryan Grabarczyk | Jaedon Miller | Trey Chernoff | Giovanni Wright | | (Saskatchewan) University of Regina |
| Wilfrid Laurier Golden Hawks | Matthew Hall | John Willsey | Jordie Lyon-Hatcher | Graham Singer | Adam Vincent | (Ontario) Wilfrid Laurier University |

=== Round-robin standings ===
Final round-robin standings

Key
| Teams to Playoffs |

| Team | Skip | W | L |
|---|---|---|---|
| (Ontario) Wilfrid Laurier Golden Hawks | Matthew Hall | 7 | 0 |
| Alberta Golden Bears | Karsten Sturmay | 6 | 1 |
| (Nova Scotia) Dalhousie Tigers | Matthew Manuel | 5 | 2 |
| (Ontario) Guelph Gryphons | Dylan Niepage | 3 | 4 |
| (Saskatchewan) Regina Cougars | Ryan Grabarczyk | 3 | 4 |
| (Manitoba) Brandon Bobcats | Mitchell Katcher | 2 | 5 |
| (Newfoundland and Labrador) Memorial Sea-Hawks | Daniel Bruce | 1 | 6 |
| (Ontario) Brock Badgers | Nick Lemieux | 1 | 6 |

=== Round-robin results ===
All draws are listed in Central Time (UTC−05:00).

==== Draw 2 ====
Wednesday, March 11, 9:00 pm

| Sheet B | 1 | 2 | 3 | 4 | 5 | 6 | 7 | 8 | 9 | 10 | Final |
|---|---|---|---|---|---|---|---|---|---|---|---|
| (Ontario) Wilfrid Laurier Golden Hawks (Hall) | 0 | 3 | 1 | 0 | 1 | 0 | 2 | 0 | 3 | X | 10 |
| (Ontario) Guelph Gryphons (Niepage) | 0 | 0 | 0 | 2 | 0 | 2 | 0 | 1 | 0 | X | 5 |

| Sheet D | 1 | 2 | 3 | 4 | 5 | 6 | 7 | 8 | 9 | 10 | Final |
|---|---|---|---|---|---|---|---|---|---|---|---|
| (Ontario) Brock Badgers (Lemieux) | 2 | 0 | 0 | 0 | 1 | 0 | 0 | 0 | X | X | 3 |
| (Nova Scotia) Dalhousie Tigers (Manuel) | 0 | 2 | 3 | 1 | 0 | 3 | 1 | 1 | X | X | 11 |

| Sheet G | 1 | 2 | 3 | 4 | 5 | 6 | 7 | 8 | 9 | 10 | Final |
|---|---|---|---|---|---|---|---|---|---|---|---|
| Alberta Golden Bears (Sturmay) | 3 | 0 | 0 | 0 | 1 | 0 | 3 | 1 | X | X | 8 |
| (Newfoundland and Labrador) Memorial Sea-Hawks (Bruce) | 0 | 0 | 1 | 1 | 0 | 1 | 0 | 0 | X | X | 3 |

| Sheet H | 1 | 2 | 3 | 4 | 5 | 6 | 7 | 8 | 9 | 10 | Final |
|---|---|---|---|---|---|---|---|---|---|---|---|
| (Manitoba) Brandon Bobcats (Katcher) | 0 | 2 | 0 | 1 | 1 | 0 | 0 | 2 | 0 | X | 6 |
| (Saskatchewan) Regina Cougars (Grabarczyk) | 2 | 0 | 1 | 0 | 0 | 0 | 3 | 0 | 3 | X | 9 |

==== Draw 4 ====
Thursday, March 12, 12:30 pm

| Sheet B | 1 | 2 | 3 | 4 | 5 | 6 | 7 | 8 | 9 | 10 | Final |
|---|---|---|---|---|---|---|---|---|---|---|---|
| (Nova Scotia) Dalhousie Tigers (Manuel) | 1 | 0 | 0 | 3 | 0 | 1 | 0 | 4 | 0 | 1 | 10 |
| (Manitoba) Brandon Bobcats (Katcher) | 0 | 1 | 2 | 0 | 2 | 0 | 1 | 0 | 2 | 0 | 8 |

| Sheet C | 1 | 2 | 3 | 4 | 5 | 6 | 7 | 8 | 9 | 10 | Final |
|---|---|---|---|---|---|---|---|---|---|---|---|
| (Newfoundland and Labrador) Memorial Sea-Hawks (Bruce) | 0 | 0 | 0 | 0 | 2 | 1 | 0 | X | X | X | 3 |
| (Ontario) Wilfrid Laurier Golden Hawks (Hall) | 0 | 1 | 1 | 4 | 0 | 0 | 1 | 2 | X | X | 9 |

| Sheet E | 1 | 2 | 3 | 4 | 5 | 6 | 7 | 8 | 9 | 10 | Final |
|---|---|---|---|---|---|---|---|---|---|---|---|
| (Ontario) Guelph Gryphons (Niepage) | 0 | 0 | 0 | 1 | 1 | 0 | 1 | 0 | X | X | 3 |
| Alberta Golden Bears (Sturmay) | 2 | 2 | 1 | 0 | 0 | 1 | 0 | 4 | X | X | 10 |

| Sheet G | 1 | 2 | 3 | 4 | 5 | 6 | 7 | 8 | 9 | 10 | Final |
|---|---|---|---|---|---|---|---|---|---|---|---|
| (Saskatchewan) Regina Cougars (Grabarczyk) | 1 | 1 | 1 | 0 | 0 | 0 | 3 | 0 | 2 | X | 8 |
| (Ontario) Brock Badgers (Lemieux) | 0 | 0 | 0 | 2 | 1 | 1 | 0 | 1 | 0 | X | 5 |

==== Draw 6 ====
Thursday, March 12, 8:30 pm

| Sheet A | 1 | 2 | 3 | 4 | 5 | 6 | 7 | 8 | 9 | 10 | Final |
|---|---|---|---|---|---|---|---|---|---|---|---|
| (Saskatchewan) Regina Cougars (Grabarczyk) | 0 | 1 | 1 | 0 | 1 | 0 | 2 | 1 | 0 | 1 | 7 |
| (Newfoundland and Labrador) Memorial Sea-Hawks (Bruce) | 1 | 0 | 0 | 1 | 0 | 1 | 0 | 0 | 2 | 0 | 5 |

| Sheet C | 1 | 2 | 3 | 4 | 5 | 6 | 7 | 8 | 9 | 10 | Final |
|---|---|---|---|---|---|---|---|---|---|---|---|
| (Manitoba) Brandon Bobcats (Katcher) | 0 | 0 | 0 | 0 | 2 | 0 | 1 | 0 | X | X | 3 |
| Alberta Golden Bears (Sturmay) | 4 | 1 | 1 | 3 | 0 | 1 | 0 | 2 | X | X | 12 |

| Sheet F | 1 | 2 | 3 | 4 | 5 | 6 | 7 | 8 | 9 | 10 | Final |
|---|---|---|---|---|---|---|---|---|---|---|---|
| (Nova Scotia) Dalhousie Tigers (Manuel) | 1 | 1 | 2 | 0 | 3 | 1 | 1 | 0 | X | X | 9 |
| (Ontario) Guelph Gryphons (Niepage) | 0 | 0 | 0 | 1 | 0 | 0 | 0 | 1 | X | X | 2 |

| Sheet H | 1 | 2 | 3 | 4 | 5 | 6 | 7 | 8 | 9 | 10 | Final |
|---|---|---|---|---|---|---|---|---|---|---|---|
| (Ontario) Brock Badgers (Lemieux) | 0 | 0 | 0 | 0 | 1 | 0 | 1 | 0 | 0 | X | 2 |
| (Ontario) Wilfrid Laurier Golden Hawks (Hall) | 0 | 2 | 0 | 1 | 0 | 0 | 0 | 3 | 4 | X | 10 |

==== Draw 8 ====
Friday, March 13, 12:30 pm

| Sheet A | 1 | 2 | 3 | 4 | 5 | 6 | 7 | 8 | 9 | 10 | Final |
|---|---|---|---|---|---|---|---|---|---|---|---|
| (Ontario) Wilfrid Laurier Golden Hawks (Hall) | 1 | 0 | 0 | 4 | 3 | 2 | 0 | 0 | X | X | 10 |
| (Manitoba) Brandon Bobcats (Katcher) | 0 | 0 | 2 | 0 | 0 | 0 | 0 | 1 | X | X | 3 |

| Sheet D | 1 | 2 | 3 | 4 | 5 | 6 | 7 | 8 | 9 | 10 | Final |
|---|---|---|---|---|---|---|---|---|---|---|---|
| (Ontario) Guelph Gryphons (Niepage) | 0 | 4 | 0 | 3 | 1 | 0 | 0 | 1 | 0 | X | 9 |
| (Saskatchewan) Regina Cougars (Grabarczyk) | 0 | 0 | 1 | 0 | 0 | 2 | 0 | 0 | 2 | X | 5 |

| Sheet E | 1 | 2 | 3 | 4 | 5 | 6 | 7 | 8 | 9 | 10 | Final |
|---|---|---|---|---|---|---|---|---|---|---|---|
| (Newfoundland and Labrador) Memorial Sea-Hawks (Bruce) | 1 | 0 | 0 | 0 | 2 | 0 | 2 | 0 | 1 | 0 | 6 |
| (Nova Scotia) Dalhousie Tigers (Manuel) | 0 | 0 | 0 | 1 | 0 | 2 | 0 | 2 | 0 | 3 | 8 |

| Sheet F | 1 | 2 | 3 | 4 | 5 | 6 | 7 | 8 | 9 | 10 | Final |
|---|---|---|---|---|---|---|---|---|---|---|---|
| Alberta Golden Bears (Sturmay) | 4 | 1 | 0 | 2 | 2 | 2 | 0 | 1 | X | X | 12 |
| (Ontario) Brock Badgers (Lemieux) | 0 | 0 | 1 | 0 | 0 | 0 | 1 | 0 | X | X | 2 |

==== Draw 10 ====
Friday, March 13, 8:30 pm

| Sheet C | 1 | 2 | 3 | 4 | 5 | 6 | 7 | 8 | 9 | 10 | Final |
|---|---|---|---|---|---|---|---|---|---|---|---|
| (Nova Scotia) Dalhousie Tigers (Manuel) | 1 | 0 | 0 | 2 | 1 | 1 | 3 | 0 | X | X | 8 |
| (Saskatchewan) Regina Cougars (Grabarczyk) | 0 | 0 | 1 | 0 | 0 | 0 | 0 | 1 | X | X | 2 |

| Sheet D | 1 | 2 | 3 | 4 | 5 | 6 | 7 | 8 | 9 | 10 | Final |
|---|---|---|---|---|---|---|---|---|---|---|---|
| Alberta Golden Bears (Sturmay) | 0 | 0 | 1 | 0 | 1 | 0 | 0 | 1 | 0 | X | 3 |
| (Ontario) Wilfrid Laurier Golden Hawks (Hall) | 0 | 1 | 0 | 1 | 0 | 0 | 3 | 0 | 1 | X | 6 |

| Sheet E | 1 | 2 | 3 | 4 | 5 | 6 | 7 | 8 | 9 | 10 | Final |
|---|---|---|---|---|---|---|---|---|---|---|---|
| (Manitoba) Brandon Bobcats (Katcher) | 0 | 0 | 1 | 0 | 2 | 0 | 2 | 0 | 1 | 0 | 6 |
| (Ontario) Brock Badgers (Lemieux) | 3 | 1 | 0 | 1 | 0 | 1 | 0 | 1 | 0 | 1 | 8 |

| Sheet H | 1 | 2 | 3 | 4 | 5 | 6 | 7 | 8 | 9 | 10 | Final |
|---|---|---|---|---|---|---|---|---|---|---|---|
| (Ontario) Guelph Gryphons (Niepage) | 2 | 0 | 3 | 1 | 1 | 0 | 0 | 0 | 4 | X | 11 |
| (Newfoundland and Labrador) Memorial Sea-Hawks (Bruce) | 0 | 1 | 0 | 0 | 0 | 2 | 1 | 0 | 0 | X | 4 |

==== Draw 11 ====
Saturday, March 14, 8:30 am

| Sheet A | 1 | 2 | 3 | 4 | 5 | 6 | 7 | 8 | 9 | 10 | Final |
|---|---|---|---|---|---|---|---|---|---|---|---|
| (Nova Scotia) Dalhousie Tigers (Manuel) | 0 | 0 | 2 | 1 | 1 | 0 | 0 | 0 | 0 | 0 | 4 |
| Alberta Golden Bears (Sturmay) | 0 | 0 | 0 | 0 | 0 | 2 | 2 | 1 | 0 | 1 | 6 |

| Sheet B | 1 | 2 | 3 | 4 | 5 | 6 | 7 | 8 | 9 | 10 | Final |
|---|---|---|---|---|---|---|---|---|---|---|---|
| (Ontario) Brock Badgers (Lemieux) | 1 | 0 | 0 | 2 | 0 | 2 | 0 | 0 | 0 | 1 | 6 |
| (Newfoundland and Labrador) Memorial Sea-Hawks (Bruce) | 0 | 0 | 1 | 0 | 2 | 0 | 3 | 1 | 1 | 0 | 8 |

| Sheet F | 1 | 2 | 3 | 4 | 5 | 6 | 7 | 8 | 9 | 10 | 11 | Final |
|---|---|---|---|---|---|---|---|---|---|---|---|---|
| (Saskatchewan) Regina Cougars (Grabarczyk) | 0 | 0 | 1 | 1 | 0 | 0 | 1 | 0 | 0 | 2 | 0 | 5 |
| (Ontario) Wilfrid Laurier Golden Hawks (Hall) | 1 | 1 | 0 | 0 | 0 | 1 | 0 | 2 | 0 | 0 | 1 | 6 |

| Sheet G | 1 | 2 | 3 | 4 | 5 | 6 | 7 | 8 | 9 | 10 | Final |
|---|---|---|---|---|---|---|---|---|---|---|---|
| (Manitoba) Brandon Bobcats (Katcher) | 0 | 3 | 0 | 0 | 1 | 0 | 2 | 0 | 3 | 0 | 9 |
| (Ontario) Guelph Gryphons (Niepage) | 2 | 0 | 1 | 1 | 0 | 1 | 0 | 1 | 0 | 1 | 7 |

==== Draw 13 ====
Saturday, March 14, 4:30 pm

| Sheet A | 1 | 2 | 3 | 4 | 5 | 6 | 7 | 8 | 9 | 10 | Final |
|---|---|---|---|---|---|---|---|---|---|---|---|
| (Ontario) Brock Badgers (Lemieux) | 1 | 1 | 0 | 1 | 0 | 1 | 0 | 0 | 0 | 1 | 5 |
| (Ontario) Guelph Gryphons (Niepage) | 0 | 0 | 1 | 0 | 2 | 0 | 2 | 1 | 1 | 0 | 7 |

| Sheet B | 1 | 2 | 3 | 4 | 5 | 6 | 7 | 8 | 9 | 10 | Final |
|---|---|---|---|---|---|---|---|---|---|---|---|
| (Saskatchewan) Regina Cougars (Grabarczyk) | 0 | 1 | 1 | 1 | 0 | 1 | 0 | 0 | 1 | 0 | 5 |
| Alberta Golden Bears (Sturmay) | 1 | 0 | 0 | 0 | 2 | 0 | 3 | 0 | 0 | 2 | 8 |

| Sheet F | 1 | 2 | 3 | 4 | 5 | 6 | 7 | 8 | 9 | 10 | 11 | Final |
|---|---|---|---|---|---|---|---|---|---|---|---|---|
| (Newfoundland and Labrador) Memorial Sea-Hawks (Bruce) | 0 | 2 | 0 | 0 | 4 | 0 | 0 | 0 | 0 | 1 | 0 | 7 |
| (Manitoba) Brandon Bobcats (Katcher) | 1 | 0 | 1 | 3 | 0 | 0 | 0 | 2 | 0 | 0 | 1 | 8 |

| Sheet G | 1 | 2 | 3 | 4 | 5 | 6 | 7 | 8 | 9 | 10 | 11 | Final |
|---|---|---|---|---|---|---|---|---|---|---|---|---|
| (Ontario) Wilfrid Laurier Golden Hawks (Hall) | 2 | 0 | 0 | 0 | 1 | 0 | 0 | 0 | 0 | 1 | 1 | 5 |
| (Nova Scotia) Dalhousie Tigers (Manuel) | 0 | 0 | 1 | 1 | 0 | 0 | 0 | 1 | 1 | 0 | 0 | 4 |

=== Playoffs ===
Semifinal
1 | (Ontario) Wilfrid Laurier Golden Hawks | 8
4 | (Ontario) Guelph Gryphons | 4
2 | Alberta Golden Bears | 5
3 | (Nova Scotia) Dalhousie Tigers | 7

Final
1 | (Ontario) Wilfrid Laurier Golden Hawks | 8
3 | (Nova Scotia) Dalhousie Tigers | 5
Bronze-medal game
4 | (Ontario) Guelph Gryphons | 6
2 | Alberta Golden Bears | 11

==== Semifinals ====
Sunday, March 15, 9:30 am

| Sheet E | 1 | 2 | 3 | 4 | 5 | 6 | 7 | 8 | 9 | 10 | Final |
|---|---|---|---|---|---|---|---|---|---|---|---|
| Alberta Golden Bears (Sturmay) | 3 | 0 | 1 | 0 | 0 | 0 | 0 | 0 | 1 | 0 | 5 |
| (Nova Scotia) Dalhousie Tigers (Manuel) | 0 | 0 | 0 | 0 | 2 | 1 | 0 | 1 | 0 | 3 | 7 |

| Sheet F | 1 | 2 | 3 | 4 | 5 | 6 | 7 | 8 | 9 | 10 | Final |
|---|---|---|---|---|---|---|---|---|---|---|---|
| (Ontario) Wilfrid Laurier Golden Hawks (Hall) | 0 | 0 | 0 | 1 | 1 | 0 | 4 | 0 | 2 | X | 8 |
| (Ontario) Guelph Gryphons (Niepage) | 0 | 1 | 1 | 0 | 0 | 1 | 0 | 1 | 0 | X | 4 |

==== Bronze-medal game ====
Sunday, March 15, 2:30 pm

| Sheet H | 1 | 2 | 3 | 4 | 5 | 6 | 7 | 8 | 9 | 10 | Final |
|---|---|---|---|---|---|---|---|---|---|---|---|
| (Ontario) Guelph Gryphons (Niepage) | 0 | 2 | 0 | 0 | 1 | 1 | 0 | 2 | 0 | 0 | 6 |
| Alberta Golden Bears (Sturmay) | 3 | 0 | 2 | 0 | 0 | 0 | 2 | 0 | 2 | 2 | 11 |

==== Final ====
Sunday, March 15, 2:30 pm

| Sheet C | 1 | 2 | 3 | 4 | 5 | 6 | 7 | 8 | 9 | 10 | Final |
|---|---|---|---|---|---|---|---|---|---|---|---|
| (Ontario) Wilfrid Laurier Golden Hawks (Hall) | 0 | 3 | 1 | 1 | 0 | 1 | 0 | 1 | 0 | 1 | 8 |
| (Nova Scotia) Dalhousie Tigers (Manuel) | 1 | 0 | 0 | 0 | 1 | 0 | 2 | 0 | 1 | 0 | 5 |

== Women ==
=== Teams ===
The teams are listed as follows:

| Team | Skip | Third | Second | Lead | Alternate | University |
|---|---|---|---|---|---|---|
| Alberta Pandas | Selena Sturmay | Abby Marks | Kate Goodhelpsen | Paige Papley | Catherine Clifford | University of Alberta |
| Brandon Bobcats | Hallie McCannell | Victoria Beaudry | Shae Arnold | Hannah McCannell | Janelle Vachon | (Manitoba) Brandon University |
| Dalhousie Tigers | Kristin Clarke | Lindsey Burgess | Kate Callaghan | Sarah Gierling | Madison Johnson | (Nova Scotia) Dalhousie University |
| McMaster Marauders | Madelyn Warriner | Kaelyn Gregory | Grace Lloyd | Madison Fisher | Danielle Hudson | (Ontario) McMaster University |
| UNB Reds | Justine Comeau | Erica Cluff | Keira McLaughlin | Meghan Beland | | University of New Brunswick |
| Queen's Golden Gaels | Mary Fay | Michaela Robert | Sarah Throop | Kenna Bartlett | Nicole Massey | (Ontario) Queen's University at Kingston |
| Regina Cougars | Stasia Wisniewski | Krystal Englot | Sarah Hoag | Taylor Stremick | | (Saskatchewan) University of Regina |
| Wilfrid Laurier Golden Hawks | Isabelle Ladouceur | Brooklyn Fahl | Emma McKenzie | Kelly Middaugh | Stacey Huras | (Ontario) Wilfrid Laurier University |

=== Round-robin standings ===
Final round-robin standings

Key
| Teams to Playoffs |

| Team | Skip | W | L |
|---|---|---|---|
| Alberta Pandas | Selena Sturmay | 6 | 1 |
| (New Brunswick) UNB Reds | Justine Comeau | 6 | 1 |
| (Ontario) Queen's Golden Gaels | Mary Fay | 5 | 2 |
| (Ontario) McMaster Marauders | Madelyn Warriner | 4 | 3 |
| (Nova Scotia) Dalhousie Tigers | Kristin Clarke | 2 | 5 |
| (Ontario) Wilfrid Laurier Golden Hawks | Isabelle Ladouceur | 2 | 5 |
| (Saskatchewan) Regina Cougars | Stasia Wisniewski | 2 | 5 |
| (Manitoba) Brandon Bobcats | Hallie McCannell | 1 | 6 |

=== Round-robin results ===
All draws are listed in Central Time (UTC−05:00).

==== Draw 1 ====
Wednesday, March 11, 5:00 pm

| Sheet B | 1 | 2 | 3 | 4 | 5 | 6 | 7 | 8 | 9 | 10 | Final |
|---|---|---|---|---|---|---|---|---|---|---|---|
| (Ontario) Queen's Golden Gaels (Fay) | 0 | 1 | 0 | 0 | 0 | 1 | 0 | 2 | 0 | 2 | 6 |
| (Ontario) Wilfrid Laurier Golden Hawks (Ladouceur) | 0 | 0 | 0 | 1 | 1 | 0 | 1 | 0 | 1 | 0 | 4 |

| Sheet D | 1 | 2 | 3 | 4 | 5 | 6 | 7 | 8 | 9 | 10 | Final |
|---|---|---|---|---|---|---|---|---|---|---|---|
| (Ontario) McMaster Marauders (Warriner) | 1 | 0 | 2 | 1 | 0 | 1 | 1 | 2 | 4 | X | 12 |
| (Nova Scotia) Dalhousie Tigers (Clarke) | 0 | 2 | 0 | 0 | 2 | 0 | 0 | 0 | 0 | X | 4 |

| Sheet G | 1 | 2 | 3 | 4 | 5 | 6 | 7 | 8 | 9 | 10 | Final |
|---|---|---|---|---|---|---|---|---|---|---|---|
| (Saskatchewan) Regina Cougars (Wisniewski) | 0 | 0 | 1 | 1 | 0 | 1 | 1 | 0 | 0 | 0 | 4 |
| (New Brunswick) UNB Reds (Comeau) | 1 | 0 | 0 | 0 | 2 | 0 | 0 | 1 | 2 | 0 | 6 |

| Sheet H | 1 | 2 | 3 | 4 | 5 | 6 | 7 | 8 | 9 | 10 | Final |
|---|---|---|---|---|---|---|---|---|---|---|---|
| Alberta Pandas (Sturmay) | 2 | 0 | 0 | 0 | 2 | 0 | 0 | 2 | 0 | X | 6 |
| (Manitoba) Brandon Bobcats (McCannell) | 0 | 0 | 1 | 0 | 0 | 0 | 0 | 0 | 2 | X | 3 |

==== Draw 3 ====
Thursday, March 12, 8:30 am

| Sheet B | 1 | 2 | 3 | 4 | 5 | 6 | 7 | 8 | 9 | 10 | Final |
|---|---|---|---|---|---|---|---|---|---|---|---|
| (Nova Scotia) Dalhousie Tigers (Clarke) | 0 | 0 | 0 | 1 | 0 | 0 | 1 | 0 | X | X | 2 |
| Alberta Pandas (Sturmay) | 0 | 3 | 1 | 0 | 1 | 3 | 0 | 1 | X | X | 9 |

| Sheet C | 1 | 2 | 3 | 4 | 5 | 6 | 7 | 8 | 9 | 10 | Final |
|---|---|---|---|---|---|---|---|---|---|---|---|
| (New Brunswick) UNB Reds (Comeau) | 0 | 0 | 3 | 0 | 3 | 0 | 4 | 0 | 2 | X | 12 |
| (Ontario) Queen's Golden Gaels (Fay) | 1 | 0 | 0 | 2 | 0 | 1 | 0 | 3 | 0 | X | 7 |

| Sheet E | 1 | 2 | 3 | 4 | 5 | 6 | 7 | 8 | 9 | 10 | Final |
|---|---|---|---|---|---|---|---|---|---|---|---|
| (Ontario) Wilfrid Laurier Golden Hawks (Ladouceur) | 0 | 0 | 2 | 0 | 1 | 0 | 0 | 2 | 1 | X | 6 |
| (Saskatchewan) Regina Cougars (Wisniewski) | 0 | 1 | 0 | 0 | 0 | 1 | 0 | 0 | 0 | X | 2 |

| Sheet G | 1 | 2 | 3 | 4 | 5 | 6 | 7 | 8 | 9 | 10 | Final |
|---|---|---|---|---|---|---|---|---|---|---|---|
| (Manitoba) Brandon Bobcats (McCannell) | 0 | 1 | 0 | 1 | 0 | 1 | 0 | 0 | 1 | 0 | 4 |
| (Ontario) McMaster Marauders (Warriner) | 1 | 0 | 1 | 0 | 1 | 0 | 1 | 1 | 0 | 2 | 7 |

==== Draw 5 ====
Thursday, March 12, 4:30 pm

| Sheet A | 1 | 2 | 3 | 4 | 5 | 6 | 7 | 8 | 9 | 10 | Final |
|---|---|---|---|---|---|---|---|---|---|---|---|
| (Manitoba) Brandon Bobcats (McCannell) | 0 | 0 | 0 | 1 | 0 | 1 | 0 | 2 | 0 | X | 4 |
| (New Brunswick) UNB Reds (Comeau) | 1 | 4 | 0 | 0 | 2 | 0 | 2 | 0 | 1 | X | 10 |

| Sheet C | 1 | 2 | 3 | 4 | 5 | 6 | 7 | 8 | 9 | 10 | 11 | Final |
|---|---|---|---|---|---|---|---|---|---|---|---|---|
| Alberta Pandas (Sturmay) | 0 | 1 | 0 | 0 | 2 | 0 | 0 | 0 | 0 | 1 | 1 | 5 |
| (Saskatchewan) Regina Cougars (Wisniewski) | 0 | 0 | 1 | 0 | 0 | 0 | 0 | 2 | 1 | 0 | 0 | 4 |

| Sheet F | 1 | 2 | 3 | 4 | 5 | 6 | 7 | 8 | 9 | 10 | Final |
|---|---|---|---|---|---|---|---|---|---|---|---|
| (Nova Scotia) Dalhousie Tigers (Clarke) | 2 | 1 | 0 | 0 | 1 | 0 | 0 | 4 | X | X | 8 |
| (Ontario) Wilfrid Laurier Golden Hawks (Ladouceur) | 0 | 0 | 1 | 1 | 0 | 0 | 1 | 0 | X | X | 3 |

| Sheet H | 1 | 2 | 3 | 4 | 5 | 6 | 7 | 8 | 9 | 10 | 11 | Final |
|---|---|---|---|---|---|---|---|---|---|---|---|---|
| (Ontario) McMaster Marauders (Warriner) | 0 | 0 | 1 | 1 | 1 | 0 | 0 | 1 | 1 | 0 | 1 | 6 |
| (Ontario) Queen's Golden Gaels (Fay) | 1 | 1 | 0 | 0 | 0 | 1 | 0 | 0 | 0 | 2 | 0 | 5 |

==== Draw 7 ====
Friday, March 13, 8:30 am

| Sheet A | 1 | 2 | 3 | 4 | 5 | 6 | 7 | 8 | 9 | 10 | Final |
|---|---|---|---|---|---|---|---|---|---|---|---|
| (Ontario) Queen's Golden Gaels (Fay) | 1 | 0 | 1 | 2 | 0 | 2 | 0 | 1 | 1 | X | 8 |
| Alberta Pandas (Sturmay) | 0 | 1 | 0 | 0 | 2 | 0 | 2 | 0 | 0 | X | 5 |

| Sheet D | 1 | 2 | 3 | 4 | 5 | 6 | 7 | 8 | 9 | 10 | Final |
|---|---|---|---|---|---|---|---|---|---|---|---|
| (Ontario) Wilfrid Laurier Golden Hawks (Ladouceur) | 2 | 0 | 0 | 2 | 2 | 2 | 0 | 1 | 0 | X | 9 |
| (Manitoba) Brandon Bobcats (McCannell) | 0 | 1 | 0 | 0 | 0 | 0 | 2 | 0 | 3 | X | 6 |

| Sheet E | 1 | 2 | 3 | 4 | 5 | 6 | 7 | 8 | 9 | 10 | Final |
|---|---|---|---|---|---|---|---|---|---|---|---|
| (New Brunswick) UNB Reds (Comeau) | 0 | 0 | 0 | 4 | 0 | 0 | 0 | 2 | 0 | 2 | 8 |
| (Nova Scotia) Dalhousie Tigers (Clarke) | 0 | 2 | 1 | 0 | 1 | 0 | 1 | 0 | 1 | 0 | 6 |

| Sheet F | 1 | 2 | 3 | 4 | 5 | 6 | 7 | 8 | 9 | 10 | Final |
|---|---|---|---|---|---|---|---|---|---|---|---|
| (Saskatchewan) Regina Cougars (Wisniewski) | 0 | 1 | 0 | 1 | 2 | 1 | 0 | 0 | 1 | X | 6 |
| (Ontario) McMaster Marauders (Warriner) | 2 | 0 | 0 | 0 | 0 | 0 | 2 | 0 | 0 | X | 4 |

==== Draw 9 ====
Friday, March 13, 4:30 pm

| Sheet C | 1 | 2 | 3 | 4 | 5 | 6 | 7 | 8 | 9 | 10 | Final |
|---|---|---|---|---|---|---|---|---|---|---|---|
| (Nova Scotia) Dalhousie Tigers (Clarke) | 2 | 0 | 1 | 0 | 0 | 3 | 0 | 0 | 2 | 0 | 8 |
| (Manitoba) Brandon Bobcats (McCannell) | 0 | 2 | 0 | 0 | 2 | 0 | 2 | 1 | 0 | 2 | 9 |

| Sheet D | 1 | 2 | 3 | 4 | 5 | 6 | 7 | 8 | 9 | 10 | 11 | Final |
|---|---|---|---|---|---|---|---|---|---|---|---|---|
| (Saskatchewan) Regina Cougars (Wisniewski) | 1 | 2 | 0 | 1 | 0 | 0 | 0 | 0 | 1 | 1 | 0 | 6 |
| (Ontario) Queen's Golden Gaels (Fay) | 0 | 0 | 1 | 0 | 3 | 0 | 0 | 2 | 0 | 0 | 1 | 7 |

| Sheet E | 1 | 2 | 3 | 4 | 5 | 6 | 7 | 8 | 9 | 10 | Final |
|---|---|---|---|---|---|---|---|---|---|---|---|
| Alberta Pandas (Sturmay) | 0 | 0 | 0 | 0 | 0 | 2 | 1 | 1 | 0 | 1 | 5 |
| (Ontario) McMaster Marauders (Warriner) | 0 | 1 | 1 | 0 | 1 | 0 | 0 | 0 | 1 | 0 | 4 |

| Sheet H | 1 | 2 | 3 | 4 | 5 | 6 | 7 | 8 | 9 | 10 | Final |
|---|---|---|---|---|---|---|---|---|---|---|---|
| (Ontario) Wilfrid Laurier Golden Hawks (Ladouceur) | 0 | 0 | 3 | 0 | 1 | 0 | 0 | 2 | 0 | 0 | 6 |
| (New Brunswick) UNB Reds (Comeau) | 0 | 0 | 0 | 2 | 0 | 1 | 1 | 0 | 2 | 2 | 8 |

==== Draw 12 ====
Saturday, March 14, 12:30 pm

| Sheet A | 1 | 2 | 3 | 4 | 5 | 6 | 7 | 8 | 9 | 10 | Final |
|---|---|---|---|---|---|---|---|---|---|---|---|
| (Nova Scotia) Dalhousie Tigers (Clarke) | 0 | 1 | 0 | 0 | 0 | 3 | 0 | 1 | 1 | 1 | 7 |
| (Saskatchewan) Regina Cougars (Wisniewski) | 0 | 0 | 2 | 0 | 2 | 0 | 2 | 0 | 0 | 0 | 6 |

| Sheet B | 1 | 2 | 3 | 4 | 5 | 6 | 7 | 8 | 9 | 10 | Final |
|---|---|---|---|---|---|---|---|---|---|---|---|
| (Ontario) McMaster Marauders (Warriner) | 2 | 1 | 0 | 0 | 1 | 1 | 0 | 1 | 0 | 0 | 6 |
| (New Brunswick) UNB Reds (Comeau) | 0 | 0 | 1 | 2 | 0 | 0 | 2 | 0 | 0 | 2 | 7 |

| Sheet F | 1 | 2 | 3 | 4 | 5 | 6 | 7 | 8 | 9 | 10 | Final |
|---|---|---|---|---|---|---|---|---|---|---|---|
| (Manitoba) Brandon Bobcats (McCannell) | 0 | 1 | 0 | 1 | 0 | 0 | 0 | 1 | 0 | X | 3 |
| (Ontario) Queen's Golden Gaels (Fay) | 1 | 0 | 1 | 0 | 2 | 1 | 1 | 0 | 3 | X | 9 |

| Sheet G | 1 | 2 | 3 | 4 | 5 | 6 | 7 | 8 | 9 | 10 | Final |
|---|---|---|---|---|---|---|---|---|---|---|---|
| Alberta Pandas (Sturmay) | 0 | 0 | 5 | 0 | 0 | 2 | 0 | 3 | X | X | 10 |
| (Ontario) Wilfrid Laurier Golden Hawks (Ladouceur) | 1 | 0 | 0 | 0 | 2 | 0 | 1 | 0 | X | X | 4 |

==== Draw 14 ====
Saturday, March 14, 8:30 pm

| Sheet A | 1 | 2 | 3 | 4 | 5 | 6 | 7 | 8 | 9 | 10 | Final |
|---|---|---|---|---|---|---|---|---|---|---|---|
| (Ontario) McMaster Marauders (Warriner) | 0 | 2 | 0 | 1 | 1 | 2 | 0 | 1 | 0 | 0 | 7 |
| (Ontario) Wilfrid Laurier Golden Hawks (Ladouceur) | 0 | 0 | 1 | 0 | 0 | 0 | 3 | 0 | 1 | 1 | 6 |

| Sheet B | 1 | 2 | 3 | 4 | 5 | 6 | 7 | 8 | 9 | 10 | Final |
|---|---|---|---|---|---|---|---|---|---|---|---|
| (Manitoba) Brandon Bobcats (McCannell) | 0 | 0 | 0 | 0 | 1 | 2 | 0 | 1 | 0 | X | 4 |
| (Saskatchewan) Regina Cougars (Wisniewski) | 1 | 3 | 1 | 1 | 0 | 0 | 2 | 0 | 1 | X | 9 |

| Sheet F | 1 | 2 | 3 | 4 | 5 | 6 | 7 | 8 | 9 | 10 | Final |
|---|---|---|---|---|---|---|---|---|---|---|---|
| (New Brunswick) UNB Reds (Comeau) | 0 | 1 | 0 | 1 | 0 | 1 | 0 | 1 | X | X | 4 |
| Alberta Pandas (Sturmay) | 2 | 0 | 2 | 0 | 2 | 0 | 2 | 0 | X | X | 8 |

| Sheet G | 1 | 2 | 3 | 4 | 5 | 6 | 7 | 8 | 9 | 10 | Final |
|---|---|---|---|---|---|---|---|---|---|---|---|
| (Ontario) Queen's Golden Gaels (Fay) | 0 | 1 | 0 | 1 | 0 | 2 | 0 | 1 | 0 | 1 | 6 |
| (Nova Scotia) Dalhousie Tigers (Clarke) | 2 | 0 | 1 | 0 | 1 | 0 | 1 | 0 | 0 | 0 | 5 |

=== Playoffs ===
Semifinal
1 | Alberta Pandas | 8
4 | (Ontario) McMaster Marauders | 4
2 | (New Brunswick) UNB Reds | 5
3 | (Ontario) Queen's Golden Gaels | 3

Final
1 | Alberta Pandas | 10
2 | (New Brunswick) UNB Reds | 2
Bronze-medal game
4 | (Ontario) McMaster Marauders | 5
3 | (Ontario) Queen's Golden Gaels | 7

==== Semifinals ====
Sunday, March 15, 9:30 am

| Sheet C | 1 | 2 | 3 | 4 | 5 | 6 | 7 | 8 | 9 | 10 | Final |
|---|---|---|---|---|---|---|---|---|---|---|---|
| (New Brunswick) UNB Reds (Comeau) | 0 | 1 | 1 | 0 | 0 | 1 | 0 | 1 | 1 | X | 5 |
| (Ontario) Queen's Golden Gaels (Fay) | 0 | 0 | 0 | 1 | 1 | 0 | 1 | 0 | 0 | X | 3 |

| Sheet D | 1 | 2 | 3 | 4 | 5 | 6 | 7 | 8 | 9 | 10 | Final |
|---|---|---|---|---|---|---|---|---|---|---|---|
| Alberta Pandas (Sturmay) | 2 | 0 | 0 | 0 | 0 | 1 | 1 | 0 | 2 | 2 | 8 |
| (Ontario) McMaster Marauders (Warriner) | 0 | 0 | 0 | 1 | 2 | 0 | 0 | 1 | 0 | 0 | 4 |

==== Bronze-medal game ====
Sunday, March 15, 2:30 pm

| Sheet G | 1 | 2 | 3 | 4 | 5 | 6 | 7 | 8 | 9 | 10 | Final |
|---|---|---|---|---|---|---|---|---|---|---|---|
| (Ontario) McMaster Marauders (Warriner) | 1 | 0 | 0 | 1 | 0 | 0 | 2 | 1 | 0 | 0 | 5 |
| (Ontario) Queen's Golden Gaels (Fay) | 0 | 1 | 0 | 0 | 3 | 1 | 0 | 0 | 2 | 0 | 7 |

==== Final ====
Sunday, March 15, 2:30 pm

| Sheet A | 1 | 2 | 3 | 4 | 5 | 6 | 7 | 8 | 9 | 10 | Final |
|---|---|---|---|---|---|---|---|---|---|---|---|
| Alberta Pandas (Sturmay) | 0 | 5 | 2 | 0 | 3 | 0 | X | X | X | X | 10 |
| (New Brunswick) UNB Reds (Comeau) | 0 | 0 | 0 | 1 | 0 | 1 | X | X | X | X | 2 |
