= Evan Lilly =

Canadian curler

- Curler
- Born: March 26, 1989 (age 37); Sudbury, Ontario, Canada

Team
- Skip: Wesley Forget
- Third: John McCutcheon
- Second: Robert Currie
- Lead: Evan Lilly

Curling career
- Member Association: Northern Ontario; Ontario
- Top CTRS ranking: 17th (2018–19)

Evan Lilly (born March 26, 1989, in Sudbury, Ontario) is a Canadian curler from Sarnia, Ontario. He currently plays lead on Team Wesley Forget.

== Career ==
Lilly won the 2005 Northern Ontario bantam championships and the 2007 Ontario high school championships. He is also a four-time Northern Ontario junior finalist.

Lilly has competed in four Canadian University Curling Championships. He played for the Western Mustangs as a second in 2009 and as a skip in 2010. He also skipped the Toronto Varsity Blues in 2014 and 2015.

On the World Curling Tour, Lilly has won the 2016 KW Fall Classic and the 2017 Brantford Nissan Classic as the third for Richard Krell, and the 2018 Huron ReproGraphics Oil Heritage Classic and the 2018 Stroud Sleeman Cash Spiel as the lead for John Willsey.

Lily has also competed in three Ontario Provincial Championships. In 2016, he played second for Ian Dickie, finishing with a 3–7 record. In 2018, he played third for Krell, finishing with a 2–3 record. In 2020, he played lead for Willsey and finished with a 4–4 record.

== Personal life ==
Lilly's sister is curler Kendra Lilly.
