= Connor Lawes =

Canadian curler

- Curler
- Born: July 14, 1996 (age 30); North Bay, Ontario, Canada

Team
- Curling club: CC Collingwood, Collingwood, ON
- Skip: Jordan Chandler
- Third: Landan Rooney
- Second: Connor Lawes
- Lead: Nathan Kim

Curling career
- Member Association: Ontario (2015–2026); Northern Ontario (2026–present)
- Other appearances: CJCC: 1 (2015); CMDCC: 1 (2014)
- Top CTRS ranking: 17th (2018–19)

Connor Lawes (born July 14, 1996) is a Canadian curler from Sundridge, Ontario. He currently plays second on Team Jordan Chandler.

== Career ==
Lawes played for skip Tanner Horgan and represented Northern Ontario at the 2015 Canadian Junior Curling Championships, finishing out of playoffs with a 6–5 record. He has also played for the Queen's Golden Gaels and the Wilfrid Laurier Golden Hawks.

With skip John Willsey, Lawes won the Stroud Sleeman Cash Spiel and the Huron ReproGraphics Oil Heritage Classic during the 2018–19 curling season. The team also competed in the 2020 Ontario Tankard, finishing the round robin with a 4–4 record.

In mixed doubles, Lawes competed at the 2014 Canadian Mixed Doubles Curling Trials, finishing with a 4–3 record and out of the championship pool.

== Personal life ==
Lawes is the nephew of two-time Olympic champion curler Kaitlyn Lawes. Lawes works as an administrative clerk with the Government of Ontario and lives in Kirkland Lake, Ontario.
