= Park Street Collegiate Institute =

- The official logo of PSCI.

Location
- 233 Park Street; Orillia, Ontario, L3V 5W1; Canada; 44°36′45″N 79°26′2″W

Information
- School type: Public, high school
- Motto: Doctrina Petentibus (Knowledge to those who seek)
- Founded: 1961
- Closed: 2013
- School board: Simcoe County District School Board
- Area trustee: Jodi Lloyd
- School number: 933627
- Grades: 9-12
- Enrollment: Peak: 925 (2006) - Pre-Demolition: <900 (2013)
- Language: English
- Colours: Maroon, Grey and White
- Team name: Trojans
- Feeder schools: Coldwater, Mount Slaven, Warminster, East Oro, Orillia Christian, Orchard Park, Guthrie

Park Street Collegiate Institute (PSCI) was a secondary school located in Orillia, Ontario, Canada. It was built in 1961 to help with the overflow of students from Orillia District Collegiate & Vocational Institute. In March 2008, a review process was started to consolidate Orillia's three public high schools into two buildings as a result of cost of maintenance of the aging buildings and the declining enrollment at PSCI.

Park Street had a capacity of 1011 students but, as of 2006, fewer than 900 students were enrolled.

On 28 November 2007, a bomb threat written on a mirror in a student washroom caused great concern and students were kept in classes in a school lockdown for the morning as police cleared the building room by room. Nothing suspicious was found and students returned to classes following an extended lunch break.

The school was closed and demolished in 2013, and a new school was planned to be built in its place to replace both Park Street Collegiate and Orillia District Collegiate & Vocational Institute.

== Special programs ==
PSCI had a Construction Craft Program in Grade 11, partnership with the YMCA and CAPC for a Young Parent Education Support Program, Life Skills courses, Co-operative education program, and a private nursery school that linked to parenting courses. Other programs included: a Latin program, full music, art and drama programs, electronics, transportation, construction, yearbook, manufacturing, drafting, model construction, and computer technology.

== Extracurricular activities ==
- Park Street Collegiate participated in Blood Donor Clinics, Take our Kids to Work Day, OPP Youth Liaison Project, Whiteball volleyball tournament, Kiwanis Big Sister Basketball Championship, Blackball Tournaments, Kiwanis Music Festival, and Sir Sam Steele Gallery.
- The Technical Program provided assistance for community projects and setting up a partnership between Habitat for Humanity and the Construction Craft program.
- Students' Administrative Council was in charge of dances, Winter Carnival, Hallowe'en and Christmas activities, Staff-Grad Baseball, Semi-formal and Formal, and the Grad Luncheon.
- Park Athletic Council was in charge of all sport-related activities, including organizing support officials for games, running buy-ins, and selling school spirit clothes.
- Cabaret - School's musical which was presented at the Orillia Opera House annually.
- Gay Straight Alliance - a club meant to break down the walls between heterosexuals and homosexuals in the student population.
- Fund Raising: PSCI raised funds annually to support Green Haven Shelter, Terry Fox Run, The Salvation Army, a foster child, respond to needs overseas, and provided support for those in need in the community. In January, 2007, Grade 10 Civics students organised to win a $5000 donation to the Orillia Food Bank from the Toskan-Casale Foundation through the Youth and Philanthropy Initiative and in December, 2007, the Peer Leadership class ran a four-day silent auction to raise money for the Orillia Food Bank.
- Operation Knapsack: Students donate left-over school supplies at the end of the school year to children in developing countries.

== Sports ==
- Boys'/Girls' Hockey, Boys'/Girls' Soccer, Boys'/Girls' Rugby, Boys'/Girls' Basketball, Boys'/Girls' Golf, Boys'/Girls' Volleyball, Track & Field, Badminton, Tennis, Boys' Football, Girls' Flag Football

== Notable alumni ==
- Bruce Stanton, Member of Parliament for Simcoe North (2006-2021)
- Don Tapscott, author and consultant
- Erin Wilson, poet
- Marnie Woodrow, novelist and screenwriter
- John Willsey, curler

== Notable faculty ==
- Don Tapscott, Sr., (1919–2006) music composer

== See also ==
- List of high schools in Ontario
