= Orillia Secondary School =

Location
- 250 Collegiate Dr; Orillia, Ontario, L3V 7S5; Canada; 44.6159°N 79.4254°W

Information
- School type: Public
- Founded: 1887, as Orillia High School current building 2015
- Superintendent: Scott Young
- Principal: Brae Montgomery
- Grades: 9 to 12
- Enrollment: 1,190 (2024)
- Language: English
- Team name: Nighthawks
- Website: oss.scdsb.on.ca

Orillia Secondary School is a secondary school located in Orillia, Ontario. It was established in 2015, following the 2013 merger of Orillia District Collegiate & Vocational Institute and Park Street Collegiate Institute. The school building was built between 2014 and 2016, and is equipped with a triple gymnasium, technology rooms, a library, and a cafeteria. The principal is Brae Montgomery.

== Origins ==
After the 2012–2013 academic year, Orillia District Collegiate & Vocational Institute was merged with Park Street Collegiate Institute, which after declining enrollment, was demolished so that a new school could be built on its former site, at the intersection of Park Street and Collegiate Drive.

== Progress Pride flag controversy ==
In early June 2024, the school flew the Progress Pride flag in order to comply with a request from the Simcoe County District School Board's diversity, equity, and inclusion (DEI) department. However, the school only had one flag pole, and the national flag normally flies on it. It is against the flag protocol to fly the national flag with another flag on the same pole. The pride flag thus flew alone, and some students reported being upset with this decision, believing it is only appropriate to fly the national flag. One OSS student who identifies as bisexual and transgender started a petition to replace it with the Canadian flag again, stating the decision "led to an increase in bullying of students from the 2SLGBTQ+ community".

== Notable alumni ==
- Leslie Frost, politician
- Gordon Lightfoot, musician
- Ethan Moreau, NHL player

== See also ==
- Education in Ontario
- List of secondary schools in Ontario
