= Huron ReproGraphics Oil Heritage Classic =

Location in Canada

The Huron ReproGraphics Oil Heritage Classic is a bonspiel part of the men's Ontario Curling Tour. The event was introduced in 2012 and is held annually in October, at the Sarnia Golf & Curling Club in Point Edward, Ontario. It became a World Curling Tour event in 2015.

== Past Champions ==
Year	Winning skip	Runner up skip	Purse (CAD)
2012	(Ontario) Rob Rumfeldt	(United States) Heath McCormick	$12,000
2013	(Ontario) Jake Higgs	(Ontario) Scott McDonald	$20,000
2014	(Ontario) Aaron Squires	(Ontario) Ian Dickie	$20,000
2015	(United States) John Shuster	(Ontario) Mark Bice	$20,000
2016	(United States) Heath McCormick	(Ontario) Jake Higgs	$17,100
2017	(Ontario) Glenn Howard	(United States) Brady Clark	$15,900
2018	(Ontario) John Willsey	(United States) Mark Fenner	$19,000
