= Matthew Hall (curler) =

Canadian curler

- Curler
- Born: July 10, 1997 (age 29); Kitchener, Ontario, Canada

Team
- Curling club: KW Granite Club, Waterloo, ON
- Skip: Matthew Hall
- Third: Sterling Middleton
- Second: Alex Horvath
- Lead: Thomas Thierbach

Curling career
- Member Association: Ontario (2013–18; 2019–2023); British Columbia (2018–19; 2026–present); Saskatchewan (2023–2026)
- Brier: 1 (2025)
- Top CTRS ranking: 6th (2024–25)
Medal record
Men's curling
Representing Canada
World Junior Curling Championships
Gold medal – first place	2019 Liverpool
Representing Ontario
Canada Winter Games
Silver medal – second place	2015 Prince George

Matthew Hall (born July 10, 1997 in Kitchener, Ontario) is a Canadian curler from Saskatoon. He currently skips his own team out of Victoria, British Columbia. He was a member of the 2019 World Junior Curling Championships gold medallist team.

== Career ==
=== Juniors ===
In 2013, Hall and his rink of Phil Malvar, Mackenzie Reid and Cody McGhee won the Ontario Bantam Boys Championship. The team went on to represent Ontario at the 2015 Canada Games, where they picked up a silver medal. The following season, Hall joined the Doug Kee junior team at second. The team won the Ontario Junior Championships and represented Ontario at the 2016 Canadian Junior Curling Championships, where they finished with a 5–5 record. The next season, Hall formed his own rink with Jeff Wanless, Joey Hart and David Hart. The team began the 2016–17 season by winning the KW Fall Classic World Curling Tour event. With this team, he won the Ontario Juniors again, and skipped Ontario at the 2017 Canadian Junior Curling Championships. There, the team won a tiebreaker match, and a semifinal before losing to British Columbia's Tyler Tardi in the final. Also in 2017, Hall led his Sir Wilfrid Laurier University men's curling team of Robert Lyon-Hatcher, Kenneth Malcolmson and Russell Cuddie to a 3–4 record at the 2017 U Sports/Curling Canada University Championships. Hall's junior rink repeated as provincial junior champions in 2018. The team had less success at the 2018 Canadian Junior Curling Championships, losing in a tiebreaker. Also in 2018, Hall and Riley Sandham won the Ontario Winter Games U21 Mixed Doubles championship.

For his final year of juniors, Hall moved to Surrey, British Columbia to play for the then two-time Canadian and defending World Junior champion Tyler Tardi rink at second. The team started the season by winning the 2018 King Cash Spiel tour event. The team represented British Columbia at the 2019 Canadian Junior Curling Championships, winning a gold medal with just one loss along the way. The team represented Canada at the 2019 World Junior Curling Championships, where they suffered just two losses en route to winning the gold medal. Between the Canadian and World Juniors, the team also made a run at the 2019 BC Men's Curling Championship, but failed to qualify for the playoffs. As World Junior champions, the team was invited to play at the 2019 Champions Cup Grand Slam event, where they were winless.

=== Men's ===
After juniors, Hall returned to Ontario, forming a team of Alex Champ, Terry Arnold, Scott Clinton. The team qualified for the 2020 Ontario Tankard, the provincial men's championship, where he led his team to a 5–3 round robin record, before losing to Scott McDonald in a tiebreaker. Later in the season, he led his Wilfrid Laurier University team of John Willsey, Jordie Lyon-Hatcher, Graham Singer and Adam Vincent to an undefeated gold medal performance at the 2020 U Sports/Curling Canada University Curling Championships in Portage la Prairie, Manitoba, beating the Dalhousie University Tigers in the final.

Hall later moved to Saskatchewan for the 2023-24 curling season, joining the Rylan Kleiter rink as second. The team finished in second place at the 2024 SaskTel Tankard, the provincial men's curling championship, losing to Mike McEwen 7–3 in the final. In their second season together, the team found even more success, winning the Tier 2 event of the 2024 Tour Challenge Grand Slam event. This win automatically qualified the team for the 2025 Masters Grand Slam event, where they finished with a 1–3 record. Shortly after their Grand Slam event, Kleiter also won their first SaskTel Tankard, beating Steve Laycock 8–5 in the final, qualifying them to represent Saskatchewan at the 2025 Montana's Brier.

== Personal life ==
In June 2020, Hall graduated with Dinstinction and a Bachelor of Science Degree in Honours Financial Mathematics from Wilfrid Laurier University. He is currently attending the University of Waterloo for a Masters of Mathematics in Computational Mathematics, specializing in the Implementation in Deep Neural Network Solutions of Financial Modelling Problems. Before attending Laurier, Hall went to Cameron Heights Collegiate Institute. While living in Surrey, he was a curling instructor at the Cloverdale Curling Club. He currently works as an oddsmaker for CoolBet.
