= Stu Sells Toronto Tankard =

- Established: 2010
- Host city: Toronto, Ontario
- Arena: High Park Club
- Men's purse: $29,000
- Women's purse: $29,000

Current champions (2026)
- Men: (Germany) Benjamin Kapp
- Women: (Nova Scotia) Christina Black

Current edition
- 2026 Stu Sells Toronto Tankard

Location in Canada

The Stu Sells Toronto Tankard, also known as the Stu Sells Tankard, is an annual bonspiel, or curling tournament, that takes place at the High Park Club in Toronto, Ontario. The event is held in a triple-knock out format, but was held in a round-robin for many years. The tournament is sponsored by Stu Sells, a local real estate company, and is part of the "Stu Sells Series" or events, which includes the Stu Sells Oakville Tankard, the Stu Sells 1824 Halifax Classic, and a number of other junior and local tour events. The men's event became a World Curling Tour event in 2011, but was later discontinued after the 2019 edition. The women's event became a World Curling Tour event in 2016, but was also discontinued in 2020. Both the men's and women's events are also part of the Ontario Curling Tour.

The event is held at the High Park Club in Toronto, excluding 2023 when it was moved to Barrie under the name Stu Sells Tankard.

The 2015 event was a flash point in the Broomgate scandal, as it featured teams using Hardline icePad versus teams using the Balance Plus Black Magic heads, the latter of which were debuted at the event. The effectiveness of the Balance Plus brooms was so strong, that it was noticeably damaging the ice. Teams got so upset that they were forced to make a "gentleman's agreement" mid-way through the event to stop using either brush head so that the conditions were fair. However, when the Balance Plus sponsored Glenn Howard rink made it to the finals against the Hardline sponsored Mike McEwen rink, Howard gave McEwen an ultimatum: either stop using the Hardline brush heads for good, or we will bring the Black Magic heads back for the final. Team McEwen refused, and so the final featured the two teams and the rival brooms in action. The game, which lasted seven ends, ended up taking 3 and half hours, more than an hour longer than normal, as the McEwen rink had to "clean up" the ice after every Team Howard shot due to the damage the Balance Plus brush heads were doing. Ironically, it was this damage that ended up ruining one of the Howard team's shots, resulting in the team losing the game.

The 2020 event was held at the KW Granite Club in Waterloo, Ontario, as the High Park Club had yet to open for the season due to the COVID-19 pandemic in Toronto.

== Past champions ==
=== Men ===
Year	Winning team	Runner up team	Purse (CAD)
2010	(Ontario) Glenn Howard, Richard Hart, Brent Laing, Craig Savill	(Ontario) Wayne Middaugh, Joe Frans, Adam Spencer, Scott Foster	$24,200
2011	(Ontario) Chris Gardner, Don Bowser, Brad Kidd, Simon Barrick	(Ontario) Robert Rumfeldt, Adam Spencer, Scott Hodgson, Greg Robinson	$28,500
2012	(Manitoba) Jeff Stoughton, Jon Mead, Reid Carruthers, Mark Nichols	(Ontario) Joe Frans, Ryan Werenich, Jeff Gorda, Shawn Kaufman	$45,000
2013	(Ontario) Glenn Howard, Wayne Middaugh, Brent Laing, Craig Savill	(Manitoba) Mike McEwen, B. J. Neufeld, Matt Wozniak, Denni Neufeld	$45,000
2014	(Manitoba) Reid Carruthers, Braeden Moskowy, Derek Samagalski, Colin Hodgson	(Ontario) Brad Jacobs, Ryan Fry, E. J. Harnden, Ryan Harnden	$45,000
2015	(Manitoba) Mike McEwen, B. J. Neufeld, Matt Wozniak, Denni Neufeld	(Ontario) Glenn Howard, Richard Hart, Robert Rumfeldt, Scott Howard	$53,000
2016	(Newfoundland and Labrador) Mark Nichols, Adam Spencer, Brett Gallant, Geoff Walker	(Ontario) John Epping, Mathew Camm, Scott Hodgson, Tim March	$48,000
2017	(Newfoundland and Labrador) Brad Gushue, Mark Nichols, Brett Gallant, Geoff Walker	(Ontario) Scott McDonald (Fourth), Codey Maus (Skip), Wesley Forget, Jeff Grant	$42,000
2018	(Manitoba) Mike McEwen (Fourth), Reid Carruthers (Skip), Derek Samagalski, Colin Hodgson	(Nova Scotia) Stuart Thompson, Colten Steele, Travis Colter, Taylor Ardiel	$42,000
2019	(Ontario) Brad Jacobs, Marc Kennedy, E. J. Harnden, Ryan Harnden	(Alberta) Kevin Koe, B. J. Neufeld, Colton Flasch, Ben Hebert	$38,000
2020	(Ontario) John Epping, Ryan Fry, Pat Janssen, Brent Laing	(Ontario) Glenn Howard, Scott Howard, David Mathers, Tim March	$4,300
2021	(Newfoundland and Labrador) Brad Gushue, Mark Nichols, Brett Gallant, Geoff Walker	(Ontario) Glenn Howard, Scott Howard, David Mathers, Tim March	$50,000
2022	(Sweden) Niklas Edin, Oskar Eriksson, Rasmus Wranå, Christoffer Sundgren	(Norway) Magnus Ramsfjell, Martin Sesaker, Bendik Ramsfjell, Gaute Nepstad	$40,000
2023	(Japan) Yusuke Morozumi, Yuta Matsumura, Ryotaro Shukuya, Masaki Iwai, Kosuke Morozumi	(South Korea) Jeong Byeong-jin, Kim Min-woo, Lee Jeong-jae, Kim Tae-hwan	$30,000
2024	(Ontario) John Epping, Jacob Horgan, Tanner Horgan, Ian McMillan	(South Korea) Jeong Byeong-jin, Kim Min-woo, Lee Jeong-jae, Kim Jeong-min	$42,000
2025	(Ontario) Mark Kean, Brady Lumley, Matthew Garner, Spencer Dunlop	(Scotland) Kyle Waddell, Mark Watt, Angus Bryce, Blair Haswell	$40,000
2026	(Germany) Benjamin Kapp, Felix Messenzehl, Johannes Scheuerl, Mario Trevisiol	(Manitoba) John Epping, B. J. Neufeld, Ryan Wiebe, Ian McMillan	$29,000

=== Women ===
Year	Winning team	Runner up team	Purse (CAD)
2010	(Ontario) Julie Hastings, Christy Trombley, Stacey Smith, Katrina Collins	(Ontario) Jacqueline Harrison, Lori Eddy, Kimberly Tuck, Julie Columbis	$12,500
2011	(Ontario) Cathy Auld, Janet Murphy, Stephanie Matheson, Melissa Foster	(Ontario) Lisa Farnell, Erin Morrissey, Kim Brown, Ainsley Galbraith	$11,000
2012	(Nova Scotia) Mary-Anne Arsenault, Colleen Jones, Kim Kelly, Jennifer Baxter	(Ontario) Lisa Farnell, Erin Morrissey, Karen Sagle, Ainsley Galbraith	$15,000
2013	(Ontario) Allison Flaxey, Katie Cottrill, Lynn Kreviazuk, Morgan Court	(Nova Scotia) Mary-Anne Arsenault, Kim Kelly, Christie Gamble, Jennifer Baxter	$15,000
2014	(Ontario) Sherry Middaugh, Jo-Ann Rizzo, Lee Merklinger, Leigh Armstrong	(Quebec) Lauren Mann, Amelie Blais, Brittany O'Rourke, Anne-Marie Filteau	$16,000
2015	(United States) Erika Brown, Allison Pottinger, Nicole Joraanstad, Natalie Nicholson	(Ontario) Rhonda Varnes, Melissa Gannon, Erin Macaulay, Rebecca Wichers-Schreur	$16,000
2016	(Ontario) Sherry Middaugh, Jo-Ann Rizzo, Lee Merklinger, Leigh Armstrong	(Ontario) Cathy Auld, Lori Eddy, Karen Rowsell, Jenna Bonner	$17,000
2017	(Ontario) Julie Tippin, Chantal Duhaime, Rachelle Vink, Tess Bobbie	(Ontario) Chrissy Cadorin, Joanne Curtis, Julia Weagle, Sarah Jagger	$16,000
2018	(Ontario) Kira Brunton, Megan Smith, Sara Guy, Kate Sherry	(Ontario) Cathy Auld, Erin Morrissey, Karen Rowsell, Jen Ahde	$20,000
2019	(Ontario) Kira Brunton, Lindsay Dubue, Calissa Daly, Kate Sherry	(Ontario) Cathy Auld, Erin Morrissey, Courtney Auld, Jen Ahde	$17,000
2020	(Ontario) Lauren Mann, Kira Brunton, Cheryl Kreviazuk, Karen Trines	(Manitoba) Jennifer Jones, Jocelyn Peterman, Lisa Weagle (3 player team)	$5,250
2021	(Ontario) Hollie Duncan, Megan Balsdon, Rachelle Strybosch, Tess Bobbie	(Ontario) Joanne Tarvit (Curtis), Shannon Jay (skip), Jillian Page (3 player team)	$36,000
2022	(Switzerland) Alina Pätz (Fourth), Silvana Tirinzoni (Skip), Carole Howald, Briar Schwaller-Hürlimann	(Ontario) Isabelle Ladouceur, Jamie Smith, Grace Lloyd, Rachel Steele	$20,000
2023	(South Korea) Kim Eun-jung, Kim Kyeong-ae, Kim Cho-hi, Kim Seon-yeong, Kim Yeong-mi	(Japan) Yuna Kotani, Kaho Onodera, Anna Ohmiya, Mina Kobayashi	$21,000
2024	(South Korea) Kim Eun-jung, Kim Kyeong-ae, Kim Cho-hi, Kim Seon-yeong, Kim Yeong-mi	(Switzerland) Alina Pätz (Fourth), Silvana Tirinzoni (Skip), Carole Howald, Selina Witschonke	$40,000
2025	(South Korea) Ha Seung-youn, Kim Hye-rin, Yang Tae-i, Kim Su-jin, Park Seo-jin	(Switzerland) Alina Pätz (Fourth), Silvana Tirinzoni (Skip), Carole Howald, Selina Witschonke	$40,000
2026	(Nova Scotia) Christina Black, Jill Brothers, Marlee Powers, Lindsey Burgess	(South Korea) Park You-been, Park Seo-jin, Yang Tae-i, Kim Su-jin	$29,000
