= 2012 StuSells Toronto Tankard =

- Host city: Toronto, Ontario
- Arena: High Park Club
- Dates: October 5–8
- Men's winner: (Manitoba) Jeff Stoughton
- Curling club: Charleswood Curling Club, Winnipeg
- Skip: Jeff Stoughton
- Third: Jon Mead
- Second: Reid Carruthers
- Lead: Mark Nichols
- Finalist: (Ontario) Joe Frans
- Women's winner: (Nova Scotia) Mary-Anne Arsenault
- Curling club: Mayflower Curling Club, Halifax
- Skip: Mary-Anne Arsenault
- Third: Colleen Jones
- Second: Kim Kelly
- Lead: Jennifer Baxter
- Finalist: (Ontario) Lisa Farnell

The 2012 StuSells Toronto Tankard was held from October 5 to 8 at the High Park Club in Toronto, Ontario as part of the 2012–13 World Curling Tour. The event was held in a triple knockout format for the men's event, and in a round robin format for the women's event. The purse for the men's event was CAD$45,000, and the winner, Jeff Stoughton, received CAD$15,000. The purse for the women's event was CAD$15,000, and the winner, Mary-Anne Arsenault, received CAD$5,000. Stoughton defeated Joe Frans in the men's final with a score of 6–2, while Arsenault defeated Lisa Farnell in the women's final with a score of 7–2.

== Men ==
=== Teams ===
The teams are listed as follows:

Skip	Third	Second	Lead	Locale
Bowie Abbis-Mills	Craig Van Ymeren	Ed Cyr	Geoff Chambers	Aylmer, Ontario
Mike Anderson	Chris Van Huyse	Matt Sheppard	Sean Harrison	Markham, Ontario
Craig Brown	Kroy Nernberger	Matt Hamilton	Derrick Casper	Madison, Wisconsin
Chris Gardner (fourth)	Mathew Camm	Brad Kidd	Bryan Cochrane (skip)	Ottawa, Ontario
Brian Damon	Michael Stefanik	Charles Skinner, Jr.	Scott Parmalee	(New York (state)) Schenectady, New York
Robert Desjardins	Jean-Sebastien Roy	Steven Munroe	Steeve Villeneuve	Chicoutimi, Quebec
John Epping	Scott Bailey	Scott Howard	David Mathers	Toronto, Ontario
Martin Ferland	François Roberge	Shawn Fowler	Maxime Elmaleh	Quebec City, Quebec
Rob Fowler	Allan Lyburn	Richard Daneault	Derek Samagalski	Brandon, Manitoba
Joe Frans	Ryan Werenich	Jeff Gorda	Shawn Kaufman	Bradford, Ontario
Christopher Plys (fourth)	Tyler George (skip)	Rich Ruohonen	Colin Hufman	Duluth, Minnesota
John Grant	Jeff Grant	Kevin Flewwelling	Larry Tobin	Toronto, Ontario
Brad Gushue	Adam Casey	Brett Gallant	Geoff Walker	St. John's, Newfoundland and Labrador
Guy Hemmings	François Gagné	Ghyslain Richard	Christian Bouchard	Montreal, Quebec
Brent Ross (fourth)	Jake Higgs (skip)	Codey Maus	Bill Buchanan	Harriston, Ontario
Glenn Howard	Wayne Middaugh	Brent Laing	Craig Savill	Coldwater, Ontario
Brad Jacobs	Ryan Fry	E. J. Harnden	Ryan Harnden	Sault Ste. Marie, Ontario
Wes Johnson	Punit Sthankiya	Kevin Hawkshaw	Mark Bresee	Toronto, Ontario
Mark Kean	Travis Fanset	Patrick Janssen	Tim March	Toronto, Ontario
Mike McEwen	B.J. Neufeld	Matt Wozniak	Denni Neufeld	Winnipeg, Manitoba
Jeremy Roe	Steve Day	Richard Maskel	Mark Hartman	Madison, Wisconsin
Robert Rumfeldt	Adam Spencer	Scott Hodgson	Greg Robinson	Guelph, Ontario
Jeff Stoughton	Jon Mead	Reid Carruthers	Mark Nichols	Winnipeg, Manitoba
Wayne Tuck, Jr.	Chad Allen	Jay Allen	Caleb Flaxey	Toronto, Ontario

=== Knockout results ===
The draw is listed as follows:

==== A event ====
First Knockout
(Wisconsin) Craig Brown	8
(Ontario) Wayne Tuck, Jr.	3
(Ontario) Jake Higgs	7
(Ontario) Wes Johnson	4
(Ontario) Joe Frans	4
(Ontario) Bowie Abbis-Mills	3
(Quebec) Robert Desjardins	6
(Wisconsin) Jeremy Roe	3

Quarterfinals
(Manitoba) Mike McEwen	5
(Wisconsin) Craig Brown	4
(Ontario) Brad Jacobs	8
(Ontario) Jake Higgs	2
(Ontario) John Epping	8
(Ontario) Joe Frans	4
(Newfoundland and Labrador) Brad Gushue	6
(Quebec) Robert Desjardins	5

Semifinals
(Manitoba) Mike McEwen	6
(Ontario) Brad Jacobs	2
(Ontario) John Epping	L
(Newfoundland and Labrador) Brad Gushue	W

Qualifier 1
(Manitoba) Mike McEwen	7
(Newfoundland and Labrador) Brad Gushue	6

First Knockout
(Quebec) Martin Ferland	8
(Ontario) John Grant	1
(Minnesota) Tyler George	5
(Quebec) Guy Hemmings	4
(Ontario) Mark Kean	7
(New York (state)) Brian Damon	2
(Ontario) Brian Cochrane	5
(Ontario) Mike Anderson	6

Quarterfinals
(Manitoba) Rob Fowler	5
(Quebec) Martin Ferland	7
(Manitoba) Jeff Stoughton	6
(Minnesota) Tyler George	2
(Ontario) Robert Rumfeldt	6
(Ontario) Mark Kean	5
(Ontario) Glenn Howard	5
(Ontario) Mike Anderson	6

Semifinals
(Quebec) Martin Ferland	6
(Manitoba) Jeff Stoughton	1
(Ontario) Robert Rumfeldt	5
(Ontario) Mike Anderson	3

Qualifier 2
(Quebec) Martin Ferland	3
(Ontario) Robert Rumfeldt	4

==== B event ====
Second Knockout
(Ontario) Jake Higgs	1
(Wisconsin) Craig Brown	8
(Quebec) Robert Desjardins	0
(Ontario) Joe Frans	6
(Ontario) Wes Johnson	7
(Ontario) Wayne Tuck, Jr.	0
(Wisconsin) Jeremy Roe	4
(Ontario) Bowie Abbis-Mills	10

Quarterfinals
(Wisconsin) Craig Brown	2
(Manitoba) Jeff Stoughton	7
(Ontario) Joe Frans	2
(Ontario) Mike Anderson	6
(Ontario) Wes Johnson	5
(Ontario) Bowie Abbis-Mills	8

Semifinals
(Manitoba) Jeff Stoughton	6
(Ontario) Mike Anderson	2
(Ontario) Bowie Abbis-Mills	0
(Newfoundland and Labrador) Brad Gushue	8

Qualifier 3
(Manitoba) Jeff Stoughton	4
(Newfoundland and Labrador) Brad Gushue	3

Second Knockout
(Manitoba) Rob Fowler	1
(Minnesota) Tyler George	7
(Ontario) Glenn Howard	6
(Ontario) Mark Kean	5
(Ontario) John Grant	8
(Quebec) Guy Hemmings	6
(New York (state)) Brian Damon	5
(Ontario) Brian Cochrane	9

Quarterfinals
(Minnesota) Tyler George	7
(Ontario) Brad Jacobs	3
(Ontario) Glenn Howard	8
(Ontario) John Epping	7
(Ontario) John Grant	1
(Ontario) Brian Cochrane	7

Semifinals
(Minnesota) Tyler George	5
(Ontario) Glenn Howard	4
(Ontario) Brian Cochrane	6
(Quebec) Martin Ferland	1

Qualifier 4
(Minnesota) Tyler George	2
(Ontario) Brian Cochrane	6

==== C event ====
Third Knockout		Quarterfinals		Semifinals		Qualifier 5
				(Ontario) Brad Jacobs	9
				(Wisconsin) Jeremy Roe	0
		(Ontario) John Grant	3
(Ontario) Wayne Tuck, Jr.	6	(Wisconsin) Jeremy Roe	5
(Wisconsin) Jeremy Roe	7					(Ontario) Brad Jacobs	3
						(Newfoundland and Labrador) Brad Gushue	1

Third Knockout
(Manitoba) Rob Fowler	5
(Ontario) Mark Kean	8

Semifinals
(Ontario) Mark Kean	6
(Ontario) Bowie Abbis-Mills	4
(Ontario) John Epping	7
(Ontario) Mike Anderson	3

Qualifier 6
(Ontario) Mark Kean	7
(Ontario) John Epping	4

Third Knockout		Semifinals		Qualifier 7
		(Ontario) Joe Frans	4
		(Quebec) Martin Ferland	3
				(Ontario) Joe Frans	6
(Ontario) Jake Higgs	3			(Ontario) Glenn Howard	2
(Quebec) Robert Desjardins	6	(Quebec) Robert Desjardins	3
		(Ontario) Glenn Howard	8

Third Knockout
(Quebec) Guy Hemmings	8
(New York (state)) Brian Damon	3

Quarterfinals
(Ontario) Wes Johnson	3
(Quebec) Guy Hemmings	9

Semifinals
(Quebec) Guy Hemmings	7
(Wisconsin) Craig Brown	3

Qualifier 8
(Quebec) Guy Hemmings	9
(Minnesota) Tyler George	4

=== Playoffs ===
Quarterfinals
(Ontario) Robert Rumfeldt	7
(Ontario) Mark Kean	4
(Manitoba) Jeff Stoughton	6
(Quebec) Guy Hemmings	1
(Manitoba) Mike McEwen	3
(Ontario) Joe Frans	5
(Ontario) Brian Cochrane	7
(Ontario) Brad Jacobs	3

Semifinals
(Ontario) Robert Rumfeldt	3
(Manitoba) Jeff Stoughton	7
(Ontario) Joe Frans	5
(Ontario) Brian Cochrane	3

Final
(Manitoba) Jeff Stoughton	6
(Ontario) Joe Frans	2

== Women ==
=== Teams ===
The teams are listed as follows:

Skip	Third	Second	Lead	Locale
Mary-Anne Arsenault	Colleen Jones	Kim Kelly	Jennifer Baxter	Halifax, Nova Scotia
Chrissy Cadorin	Janet Langevinl	Sandy Becher	Cindy McKnight	Toronto, Ontario
Kelly Cochrane	Brenna Cochrane	Adele Campbell	Joanne Curtis	Toronto, Ontario
Ginger Coyle	Lauren Wood	Laura Brown	Robyn Murphy	Dundas, Ontario
Lisa Farnell	Erin Morrissey	Karen Sagle	Ainsley Galbraith	Elgin, Ontario
Jacqueline Harrison	Kimberly Tuck	Susan Froud	Heather Nicol	Waterdown, Ontario
Julie Hastings	Christy Trombley	Stacey Smith	Katrina Collins	Thornhill, Ontario
Courtney Hodgson	Jenna Bonner	Amanda Gebhardt	Amber Gebhardt	Guelph, Ontario
Susan McKnight	Catherine Kaino	Karen Rowsell	Jordan Ariss	Uxbridge, Ontario
Jill Mouzar	Stephanie LeDrew	Danielle Inglis	Hollie Nicol	Toronto, Ontario
Allison Nimik	Katie Pringle	Lynn Kreviazuk	Morgan Court	Toronto, Ontario
Julie Reddick	Carrie Lindner	Megan Balsdon	Laura Hickey	Toronto, Ontario
Jamie Sinclair	Holly Donaldson	Erin Jenkins	Katelyn Wasylkiw	Manotick, Ontario
Jennifer Spencer	Karyn Issler	Jenn Ellard	Michelle Laidlaw	Brampton, Ontario
Stephanie Van Huyse	Sheryl Tavoularis	Laura Arbour	Jennifer Allan	Whitby, Ontario

=== Round-robin standings ===
Final round-robin standings

Key
Teams to Playoffs

Pool A	W	L
(Ontario) Jacqueline Harrison	3	1
(Ontario) Allison Nimik	3	1
(Ontario) Jamie Sinclair	2	2
(Ontario) Kelly Cochrane	1	3
(Ontario) Jennifer Spencer	1	3

Pool B	W	L
(Ontario) Jill Mouzar	3	1
(Ontario) Julie Hastings	3	1
(Ontario) Susan McKnight	3	1
(Ontario) Ginger Coyle	1	3
(Ontario) Chrissy Cadorin	0	4

Pool C	W	L
(Ontario) Lisa Farnell	4	0
(Nova Scotia) Mary-Anne Arsenault	3	1
(Ontario) Julie Reddick	2	2
(Ontario) Stephanie Van Huyse	1	3
(Ontario) Courtney Hodgson	0	4

=== Playoffs ===
Quarterfinals
(Ontario) Julie Hastings	7
(Ontario) Allison Nimik	2
(Ontario) Jacqueline Harrison	4
(Nova Scotia) Mary-Anne Arsenault	5

Semifinals
(Ontario) Lisa Farnell	7
(Ontario) Julie Hastings	2
(Ontario) Jill Mouzar	4
(Nova Scotia) Mary-Anne Arsenault	9

Final
(Ontario) Lisa Farnell	2
(Nova Scotia) Mary-Anne Arsenault	7
