= 2013 StuSells Toronto Tankard =

- Host city: Toronto, Ontario
- Arena: High Park Club
- Dates: October 11–14
- Men's winner: (Ontario) Glenn Howard
- Curling club: Penetang CC, Penetanguishene
- Skip: Glenn Howard
- Third: Wayne Middaugh
- Second: Brent Laing
- Lead: Craig Savill
- Finalist: (Manitoba) Mike McEwen
- Women's winner: (Ontario) Allison Flaxey
- Skip: Allison Flaxey
- Third: Katie Pringle
- Second: Lynn Kreviazuk
- Lead: Morgan Court
- Finalist: (Nova Scotia) Mary-Anne Arsenault

The 2013 StuSells Toronto Tankard was held from October 11 to 14 at the High Park Club in Toronto, Ontario. The men's event was held as part of the 2013–14 World Curling Tour, while the women's event was held only as part of the 2013–14 Ontario Curling Tour. The men's event was held in a triple-knockout format, while the women's event was held in a round robin format. The purse for the men's event was CAD$45,000, of which the winner, Glenn Howard, received CAD$15,000, while the purse for the women's event was CAD$15,000, of which the winner, Allison Flaxey, received CAD$5,000. In the men's final, Howard defeated Mike McEwen with a score of 6–3, while in the women's final, Flaxey defeated Mary-Anne Arsenault with a score of 6–2.

== Men ==
=== Teams ===
The teams are listed as follows:

Skip	Third	Second	Lead	Locale
Mike Anderson	Mike McLean	Chris Van Huyse	Sean Harrison	Markham, Ontario
Evgeniy Arkhipov	Sergei Glukhov	Dmitry Mironov	Artur Razhabov	Moscow, Russia
Roy Arndt	Kyle Duck	Jeff MacDonald	Stuart Sankey	Toronto, Ontario
Mathew Camm (fourth)	Chris Gardner	Brad Kidd	Bryan Cochrane (skip)	Nepean, Ontario
Robert Desjardins	Frederic Lawton	Miguel Bernard	Martin Lavoie	Saguenay, Quebec
Andrey Drozdov	Alexey Stukalskiy	Alexey Tselousov	Petr Dron	Moscow, Russia
John Epping	Scott Bailey	Collin Mitchell	David Mathers	Toronto, Ontario
Pete Fenson	Shawn Rojeski	Joe Polo	Ryan Brunt	Bemidji, Minnesota
Pat Ferris	Andrew Fairfull	Craig Fairfull	Robert Larmer	Grimsby, Ontario
Joe Frans	Ryan Werenich	Jeff Gorda	Shawn Kaufman	Ontario
Christopher Plys (fourth)	Tyler George (skip)	Rich Ruohonen	Colin Hufman	Duluth, Minnesota
Brad Gushue	Brett Gallant	Adam Casey	Geoff Walker	St. John's, Newfoundland and Labrador
Brent Ross (fourth)	Jake Higgs (skip)	Codey Maus	Bill Buchanan	Harriston, Ontario
Steffen Mellemsetter	Markus Høiberg	Steffen Walstad	Magnus Nedregotten	Oppdal, Norway
Glenn Howard	Wayne Middaugh	Brent Laing	Craig Savill	Penetanguishene, Ontario
Mark Kean	Travis Fanset	Patrick Janssen	Tim March	Ontario
Craig Kochan	Phil Loevenmark	Andrew Clayton	Geoff Chambers	Toronto, Ontario
Alex Leichter	Brandon Corbett	Derek Corbett	Jeff Pulli	(New York (state)) Rochester, New York
Mike McEwen	B. J. Neufeld	Matt Wozniak	Denni Neufeld	Winnipeg, Manitoba
Jean-Michel Ménard	Martin Crête	Éric Sylvain	Philippe Ménard	Gatineau, Quebec
Rob Rumfeldt	Adam Spencer	Scott Howard	Scott Hodgson	Ontario
Jeff Stoughton	Jon Mead	Reid Carruthers	Mark Nichols	Winnipeg, Manitoba
Wayne Tuck, Jr.	Chad Allen	Jay Allen	Caleb Flaxey	Brantford, Ontario
Jake Walker	Dayna Deruelle	Andrew McGaugh	Michael McGaugh	Brampton, Ontario

=== Knockout results ===
==== A event ====
First knockout
(Ontario) Mike Anderson	5
(Ontario) Wayne Tuck, Jr.	8
(Ontario) Bryan Cochrane	5
(Ontario) Roy Arndt	2
(Minnesota) Tyler George	5
(Ontario) Craig Kochan	3
(Minnesota) Pete Fenson	5
(Quebec) Robert Desjardins	7

Quarterfinals
(Manitoba) Jeff Stoughton	5
(Ontario) Wayne Tuck, Jr.	3
(Ontario) Joe Frans	6
(Ontario) Bryan Cochrane	2
(Newfoundland and Labrador) Brad Gushue	7
(Minnesota) Tyler George	3
(Ontario) John Epping	8
(Quebec) Robert Desjardins	6

Semifinals
(Manitoba) Jeff Stoughton	6
(Ontario) Joe Frans	2
(Newfoundland and Labrador) Brad Gushue	3
(Ontario) John Epping	8

Qualifier 1
(Manitoba) Jeff Stoughton	3
(Ontario) John Epping	5

First knockout
(Russia) Andrey Drozdov	2
(Ontario) Jake Walker	7
(Ontario) Rob Rumfeldt	7
(New York (state)) Alex Leichter	2
(Ontario) Pat Ferris	2
(Norway) Markus Høiberg	5
(Ontario) Jake Higgs	4
(Russia) Evgeniy Arkhipov	2

Quarterfinals
(Ontario) Glenn Howard	9
(Ontario) Jake Walker	3
(Quebec) Jean-Michel Ménard	0
(Ontario) Rob Rumfeldt	6
(Manitoba) Mike McEwen	9
(Norway) Markus Høiberg	7
(Ontario) Mark Kean	5
(Ontario) Jake Higgs	2

Semifinals
(Ontario) Glenn Howard	5
(Ontario) Rob Rumfeldt	8
(Manitoba) Mike McEwen	6
(Ontario) Mark Kean	4

Qualifier 2
(Ontario) Rob Rumfeldt	2
(Manitoba) Mike McEwen	7

==== B event ====
Second knockout
(Ontario) Bryan Cochrane	5
(Ontario) Wayne Tuck, Jr.	6
(Quebec) Robert Desjardins	8
(Minnesota) Tyler George	2
(Ontario) Roy Arndt	2
(Ontario) Mike Anderson	6
(Minnesota) Pete Fenson	5
(Ontario) Craig Kochan	6

Quarterfinals
(Ontario) Wayne Tuck, Jr.	5
(Ontario) Glenn Howard	7
(Quebec) Robert Desjardins	6
(Ontario) Mark Kean	4
(Ontario) Mike Anderson	2
(Ontario) Craig Kochan	5

Semifinals
(Ontario) Glenn Howard	5
(Quebec) Robert Desjardins	3
(Ontario) Craig Kochan	2
(Manitoba) Jeff Stoughton	5

Qualifier 3
(Ontario) Glenn Howard	4
(Manitoba) Jeff Stoughton	5

Second knockout
(Ontario) Jake Walker	3
(Quebec) Jean-Michel Ménard	5
(Ontario) Jake Higgs	5
(Norway) Markus Høiberg	7
(Russia) Andrey Drozdov	6
(New York (state)) Alex Leichter	3
(Ontario) Pat Ferris	9
(Russia) Evgeniy Arkhipov	4

Quarterfinals
(Quebec) Jean-Michel Ménard	6
(Ontario) Joe Frans	1
(Norway) Markus Høiberg	5
(Newfoundland and Labrador) Brad Gushue	9
(Russia) Andrey Drozdov	4
(Ontario) Pat Ferris	3

Semifinals
(Quebec) Jean-Michel Ménard	3
(Newfoundland and Labrador) Brad Gushue	5
(Russia) Andrey Drozdov	5
(Ontario) Rob Rumfeldt	2

Qualifier 4
(Newfoundland and Labrador) Brad Gushue	6
(Russia) Andrey Drozdov	3

==== C event ====
Third knockout		Quarterfinals		Semifinals		Qualifier 5
				(Ontario) Joe Frans	6
				(Ontario) Roy Arndt	2
		(Ontario) Pat Ferris	5
(Ontario) Roy Arndt	6	(Ontario) Roy Arndt	6
(Minnesota) Pete Fenson	5					(Ontario) Joe Frans	4
						(Ontario) Glenn Howard	6

Third Knockout
(Ontario) Jake Walker	7
(Ontario) Jake Higgs	4

Semifinals
(Ontario) Jake Walker	6
(Ontario) Craig Kochran	0
(Norway) Markus Høiberg	6
(Quebec) Robert Dejardins	5

Qualifier 6
(Ontario) Jake Walker	3
(Norway) Markus Høiberg	4

Third knockout		Semifinals		Qualifier 7
		(Ontario) Mark Kean	7
		(Ontario) Rob Rumfeldt	5
				(Ontario) Mark Kean	5
(Ontario) Bryan Cochrane	9			(Ontario) Bryan Cochrane	7
(Minnesota) Tyler George	2	(Ontario) Bryan Cochrane	6
		(Quebec) Jean-Michel Menard	4

Third knockout
(New York (state)) Alex Leichter	3
(Russia) Evgeniy Arkhipov	7

Quarterfinals
(Ontario) Mike Anderson	9
(Russia) Evgeniy Arkhipov	5

Semifinals
(Ontario) Mike Anderson	6
(Ontario) Wayne Tuck, Jr.	5

Qualifier 8
(Ontario) Mike Anderson	6
(Russia) Andrey Drozdov	2

=== Playoffs ===
Quarterfinals
(Manitoba) Mike McEwen	8
(Norway) Markus Høiberg	2
(Manitoba) Jeff Stoughton	5
(Ontario) Mike Anderson	6
(Ontario) John Epping	1
(Ontario) Bryan Cochrane	6
(Newfoundland and Labrador) Brad Gushue	3
(Ontario) Glenn Howard	4

Semifinals
(Manitoba) Mike McEwen	6
(Ontario) Mike Anderson	4
(Ontario) Bryan Cochrane	5
(Ontario) Glenn Howard	7

Final
(Manitoba) Mike McEwen	3
(Ontario) Glenn Howard	6

== Women ==
=== Teams ===
The teams are listed as follows:

Skip	Third	Second	Lead	Locale
Mary-Anne Arsenault	Kim Kelly	Christie Gamble	Jennifer Baxter	Halifax, Nova Scotia
Marika Bakewell	Jessica Corrado	Stephanie Corrado	Jasmine Thurston	Markdale, Ontario
Suzanne Birt	Shelly Bradley	Michelle McQuaid	Susan McInnis	Charlottetown, Prince Edward Island
Chrissy Cadorin	Katie Lindsay	Stephanie Thompson	Lauren Wood	Toronto, Ontario
Lisa Farnell	Erin Morrissey	Karen Sagle	Ainsley Galbraith	Elgin, Ontario
Allison Flaxey	Katie Pringle	Lynn Kreviazuk	Morgan Court	Listowel, Ontario
Kerry Galusha	Ashley Green	Megan Cormier	Wendy Miller	Yellowknife, Northwest Territories
Jacqueline Harrison	Kimberly Tuck	Susan Froud	Andra Aldred	Brantford, Ontario
Julie Hastings	Cheryl McPherson	Stacey Smith	Katrina Collins	Thornhill, Ontario
Krista McCarville	Ashley Miharija	Kari Lavoie	Sarah Lang	Thunder Bay, Ontario
Susan McKnight	Catherine Kaino	Karen Rowsell	Joanne Curtis	Uxbridge, Ontario
Katie Morrissey	Shannon Harrington	Cassandra de Groot	Kiri Campbell	Ottawa, Ontario
Julie Reddick	Carrie Lindner	Megan Balsdon	Laura Hickey	Toronto, Ontario
Heather Smith-Dacey	Jill Mouzar	Blisse Comstock	Teri Lake	Halifax, Nova Scotia
Jennifer Spencer	Jaimee Gardner	Amanda Gebhardt	Becky Philpott	Guelph, Ontario

=== Round-robin standings ===
Final round-robin standings

Key
Teams to playoffs

Pool A	W	L
(Ontario) Allison Flaxey	4	0
(Ontario) Jacqueline Harrison	2	2
(Prince Edward Island) Suzanne Birt	2	2
(Ontario) Susan McKnight	2	2
(Ontario) Chrissy Cadorin	0	4

Pool B	W	L
(Nova Scotia) Heather Smith-Dacey	4	0
(Nova Scotia) Mary-Anne Arsenault	2	2
(Northwest Territories) Kerry Galusha	2	2
(Ontario) Katie Morrissey	1	3
(Ontario) Julie Reddick	1	3

Pool C	W	L
(Ontario) Lisa Farnell	2	2
(Ontario) Marika Bakewell	2	2
(Ontario) Julie Hastings	2	2
(Ontario) Krista McCarville	2	2
(Ontario) Jennifer Spencer	2	2

=== Playoffs ===
Quarterfinals		Semifinals		Final
		(Ontario) Allison Flaxey	3
(Ontario) Jacqueline Harrison	7	(Ontario) Jacqueline Harrison	2
(Ontario) Marika Bakewell	3			(Ontario) Allison Flaxey	6
(Ontario) Lisa Farnell	2			(Nova Scotia) Mary-Anne Arsenault	2
(Nova Scotia) Mary-Anne Arsenault	4	(Nova Scotia) Mary-Anne Arsenault	6
		(Nova Scotia) Heather Smith-Dacey	3
