= 2011 StuSells Toronto Tankard =

- Host city: Toronto, Ontario
- Arena: High Park Club
- Dates: October 7–10
- Men's winner: (Ontario) Chris Gardner
- Curling club: Ottawa, Ontario
- Skip: Chris Gardner
- Third: Don Bowser
- Second: Brad Kidd
- Lead: Simon Barrick
- Finalist: (Ontario) Robert Rumfeldt
- Women's winner: (Ontario) Cathy Auld
- Curling club: Mississauga, Ontario
- Skip: Cathy Auld
- Third: Janet Murphy
- Second: Stephanie Gray
- Lead: Melissa Foster
- Finalist: (Ontario) Lisa Farnell

The 2011 StuSells Toronto Tankard was held from October 7 to 10 at the High Park Club in Toronto, Ontario as part of the 2011–12 World Curling Tour. The purse for the event was CAD$28,500. The event was held in a triple knockout format.

== Men ==
=== Teams ===
| Skip | Third | Second | Lead | Locale |
|---|---|---|---|---|
| Mike Anderson | Chris Van Huyse | Matt Mapletoft | Sean Harrison | Markham, Ontario |
| Greg Balsdon | Chris Ciasnocha | Tyler Morgan | Jamie Farnell | Kingston, Ontario |
| Denis Belanger | John Grant | Mark Koivula | Dennis Lemon | Toronto, Ontario |
| Mark Bice | Codey Maus | Steve Bice | Jamie Danbrook | Sarnia, Ontario |
| Robert Brewer | Al Belec | Dusty Jakomait | Greg McLellan | Sault Ste. Marie, Ontario |
| Peter Corner | Graeme McCarrel | Joe Frans | Darryl Prebble | Brampton, Ontario |
| Brian Damon | Michael Stefanik | Peter Drechsler | Arthur Merkley | (New York (state)) Schenectady, New York |
| John Epping | Scott Bailey | Scott Howard | David Mathers | Toronto, Ontario |
| John Ferren | Bob Silas | Kyle Duck | Greg Reynolds | Toronto, Ontario |
| Chris Gardner | Don Bowser | Brad Kidd | Simon Barrick | Ottawa, Ontario |
| Tyler George | Chris Plys | Rich Ruohonen | Aanders Brorson | Duluth, Minnesota |
| Brad Gushue | Ryan Fry | Geoff Walker | Adam Casey | St. John's, Newfoundland and Labrador |
| Mike Harris | Jim Wilson | Scott Foster | Ken McDermott | Oakville, Ontario |
| Brent Ross (fourth) | Jake Higgs (skip) | Jonathan Beuk | Bill Buchanan | Harriston, Ontario |
| Glenn Howard | Wayne Middaugh | Brent Laing | Craig Savill | Coldwater, Ontario |
| Brad Jacobs | E. J. Harnden | Ryan Harnden | Scott Seabrook | Sault Ste. Marie, Ontario |
| Mark Kean | Andrew Clayton | Patrick Janssen | Tim March | Toronto, Ontario |
| Dale Matchett | Ryan Werenich | Jeff Gorda | Shawn Kaufman | Bradford, Ontario |
| Robert Rumfeldt | Adam Spencer | Scott Hodgson | Greg Robinson | Guelph, Ontario |
| Wayne Tuck, Jr. | Craig Kochan | Scott McDonald | Paul Moffatt | Toronto, Ontario |

=== Knockout results ===
==== A event ====
First Knockout
(Ontario) Mike Anderson | 9
(Ontario) Denis Belanger | 5
(Ontario) Robert Rumfeldt | 8
(New York (state)) Brian Damon | 0

Quarterfinals
(Ontario) Glenn Howard | 7
(Ontario) Mike Anderson | 2
(Newfoundland and Labrador) Brad Gushue | 3
(Ontario) Jake Higgs | 6
(Ontario) Dale Matchett | 2
(Ontario) Robert Rumfeldt | 5
(Ontario) Peter Corner | 7
(Ontario) Chris Gardner | 2

Semifinals
(Ontario) Glenn Howard | 9
(Ontario) Jake Higgs | 3
(Ontario) Robert Rumfeldt | 2
(Ontario) Peter Corner | 6

Qualifier 1
(Ontario) Glenn Howard | 5
(Ontario) Peter Corner | 2

First Knockout
(Minnesota) Tyler George | 9
(Ontario) John Ferren | 2
(Ontario) Mike Harris | 6
(Ontario) Robert Brewer | 0

Quarterfinals
(Ontario) John Epping | 6
(Minnesota) Tyler George | 3
(Ontario) Mark Kean | 8
(Ontario) Wayne Tuck, Jr. | 5
(Ontario) Brad Jacobs | 9
(Ontario) Mike Harris | 7
(Ontario) Greg Balsdon | 4
(Ontario) Mark Bice | 6

Semifinals
(Ontario) John Epping | 7
(Ontario) Mark Kean | 1
(Ontario) Brad Jacobs | 7
(Ontario) Mark Bice | 8

Qualifier 2
(Ontario) John Epping | 4
(Ontario) Mark Bice | 3

==== B event ====
Second Knockout
(Newfoundland and Labrador) Brad Gushue | 8
(Ontario) Denis Belanger | 3
(Ontario) Chris Gardner | 9
(New York (state)) Brian Damon | 4

Quarterfinals
(Newfoundland and Labrador) Brad Gushue | 6
(Ontario) Dale Matchett | 0
(Ontario) Mark Kean | 5
(Ontario) Brad Jacobs | 6
(Ontario) Chris Gardner | 5
(Ontario) Mike Anderson | 4

Semifinals
(Newfoundland and Labrador) Brad Gushue | 8
(Ontario) Brad Jacobs | 2
(Ontario) Chris Gardner | 7
(Ontario) Peter Corner | 0

Qualifier 3
(Newfoundland and Labrador) Brad Gushue | 5
(Ontario) Chris Gardner | 8

Second Knockout
(Ontario) Wayne Tuck, Jr. | 6
(Ontario) John Ferren | 2
(Ontario) Greg Balsdon | 8
(Ontario) Robert Brewer | 3

Quarterfinals
(Ontario) Wayne Tuck, Jr. | 4
(Ontario) Mike Harris | 8
(Ontario) Jake Higgs | 2
(Ontario) Robert Rumfeldt | 6
(Ontario) Greg Balsdon | 5
(Minnesota) Tyler George | 8

Semifinals
(Ontario) Mike Harris | 4
(Ontario) Robert Rumfeldt | 6
(Minnesota) Tyler George | 3
(Ontario) Mark Bice | 9

Qualifier 4
(Ontario) Robert Rumfeldt | 7
(Ontario) Mark Bice | 2

==== C event ====
| Third Knockout | | Semifinals | Qualifier 5 |
| | | (Ontario) Mark Kean |
| (Ontario) Denis Belanger | 11 | (Ontario) Denis Belanger |
| (New York (state)) Brian Damon | 3 | | (Ontario) Mark Kean | 6 |
| | | | (Ontario) Mark Bice | 4 |

| Third Knockout | Qualifier 6 |
| (Ontario) Dale Matchett |
| (Minnesota) Tyler George | (Ontario) Dale Matchett | 6 |
| (Ontario) Mike Anderson | (Ontario) Mike Harris | 3 |
| (Ontario) Mike Harris |

| Third Knockout | | Qualifier 7 |
| (Ontario) Wayne Tuck, Jr. | 6 |
| (Ontario) Peter Corner | 1 | (Ontario) Wayne Tuck, Jr. | 4 |
| (Ontario) Greg Balsdon | 3 | (Ontario) Brad Jacobs | 8 |
| (Ontario) Brad Jacobs | 5 |

| Third Knockout | | Semifinals | | Qualifier 8 |
| (Ontario) John Ferren | 3 |
| (Ontario) Robert Brewer | 7 | (Ontario) Robert Brewer | 4 |
| | | (Ontario) Jake Higgs | 9 |
| | | | | (Ontario) Jake Higgs | 6 |
| | | | | (Newfoundland and Labrador) Brad Gushue | 3 |

=== Playoffs ===
Quarterfinals
(Ontario) Glenn Howard | 6
(Ontario) Jake Higgs | 7
(Ontario) Robert Rumfeldt | 6
(Ontario) Mark Kean | 5
(Ontario) John Epping | 6
(Ontario) Brad Jacobs | 3
(Ontario) Chris Gardner | 6
(Ontario) Dale Matchett | 1

Semifinals
(Ontario) Jake Higgs | 2
(Ontario) Robert Rumfeldt | 4
(Ontario) John Epping | 4
(Ontario) Chris Gardner | 7

Final
(Ontario) Robert Rumfeldt | 5
(Ontario) Chris Gardner | 6

== Women ==
=== Teams ===
| Skip | Third | Second | Lead | Locale |
|---|---|---|---|---|
| Cathy Auld | Janet Murphy | Stephanie Gray | Melissa Foster | Mississauga, Ontario |
| Kathy Brown | Janet Langevin | Abbie Darnley | Margie Hewitt | Guelph, Ontario |
| Chrissy Cadorin | Brit O'Neill | Jenn Minchin | Jasmine Thurston | Glendale, Ontario |
| Kelly Cochrane | Brenna Cochrane | Adele Campbell | Rebecca Duck | Toronto, Ontario |
| Lisa Farnell | Erin Morrissey | Kim Brown | Ainsley Galbraith | Chaffeys Locks, Ontario |
| Julie Hastings | Christy Trombley | Stacey Smith | Katrina Collins | Thornhill, Ontario |
| Katie Lindsay | Nicole Westlund | Lauren Wasylkiw | Stephanie Thompson | Welland, Ontario |
| Janet McGhee | Jennifer Spencer | Karyn Issler | Sheri Greenman | Uxbridge, Ontario |
| Susan McKnight | Susan Froud | Karen Rowsell | Cindy McKnight | Uxbridge, Ontario |
| Allison Nimik | Lori Eddy | Kimberly Tuck | Julie Columbus | Elmvale, Ontario |
| Kirsten Wall | Hollie Nicol | Danielle Inglis | Jill Mouzar | Toronto, Ontario |
| Ashley Waye | Amberle Bocsy | Marnie Loeb | Lauren Wood | Toronto, Ontario |

=== Round Robin Standings ===
| Pool A | W | L |
|---|---|---|
| (Ontario) Julie Hastings | 4 | 1 |
| (Ontario) Allison Nimik | 3 | 2 |
| (Ontario) Kirsten Wall | 3 | 2 |
| (Ontario) Katie Lindsay | 2 | 3 |
| (Ontario) Janet McGhee | 2 | 3 |
| (Ontario) Kelly Cochrane | 1 | 4 |

| Pool B | W | L |
|---|---|---|
| (Ontario) Kathy Brown | 5 | 0 |
| (Ontario) Lisa Farnell | 4 | 1 |
| (Ontario) Cathy Auld | 3 | 2 |
| (Ontario) Chrissy Cadorin | 2 | 3 |
| (Ontario) Susan McKnight | 1 | 4 |
| (Ontario) Ashley Waye | 0 | 5 |

=== Playoffs ===
Semifinals
1 | (Ontario) Kathy Brown | 4
4 | (Ontario) Cathy Auld | 6
3 | (Ontario) Julie Hastings | 5
2 | (Ontario) Lisa Farnell | 8

Final
(Ontario) Cathy Auld | 10
(Ontario) Lisa Farnell | 8
