= 2017 Stu Sells Toronto Tankard =

2017 StuSells Toronto Tankard
- Host city: Toronto, Ontario
- Arena: High Park Club
- Dates: October 6–9
- Men's winner: (Newfoundland and Labrador) Brad Gushue
- Curling club: Bally Haly G&CC, St. John's, Newfoundland and Labrador
- Skip: Brad Gushue
- Third: Mark Nichols
- Second: Brett Gallant
- Lead: Geoff Walker
- Finalist: (Ontario) Codey Maus
- Women's winner: (Ontario) Julie Tippin
- Curling club: Woodstock CC, Woodstock, Ontario
- Skip: Julie Tippin
- Third: Chantal Duhaime
- Second: Rachelle Vink
- Lead: Tess Bobbie
- Finalist: (Ontario) Chrissy Cadorin

The 2017 StuSells Toronto Tankard was held from October 11 to 14 at the High Park Club in Toronto, Ontario. The event was held as part of the 2017–18 World Curling Tour.

== Men ==
=== Teams ===
The teams are listed as follows:

Skip	Third	Second	Lead	Locale
Greg Balsdon	Don Bowser	Jonathan Beuk	Scott Chadwick	Kingston, Ontario
Mark Bice	Aaron Squires	Tyler Morgan	Steve Bice	Sarnia, Ontario
Jordan Chandler	Sandy MacEwan	Luc Oimet	Lee Toner	Sudbury, Ontario
Denis Cordick	Doug McDermot	David Jones	Richard Green	Georgetown, Ontario
Dayna Deruelle	Kevin Flewwelling	David Staples	Sean Harrison	Kingston, Ontario
John Epping	Mathew Camm	Patrick Janssen	Tim March	Toronto, Ontario
Brad Gushue	Mark Nichols	Brett Gallant	Geoff Walker	St. John's, Newfoundland and Labrador
Mike Harris	Jeff Wanless	Joey Hart	David Hart	Waterloo, Ontario
Tanner Horgan	Jacob Horgan	Nicholas Bissoneette	Maxime Blais	Sudbury, Ontario
Glenn Howard	Richard Hart	David Mathers	Scott Howard	(Ontario) Islington, Toronto
Kim Chang-min	Seong Se-hyeon	Oh Eun-soo	Lee Ki-bok	Uiseong, South Korea
William Lyburn	Richard Daneault	Jared Kolomaya	Braden Zawada	Winnipeg, Manitoba
Scott McDonald	Codey Maus (skip)	Wesley Forget	Jeff Grant	London, Ontario
Mike McLean	Jason Camm	Kevin Lagerquist	Nate Crawford	Ottawa, Ontario
Robert Desjardins	Jean-Sébastien Roy	Pierre-Luc Morissette (skip)	René Dubois	Chicoutimi, Quebec
Jamie Murphy	Paul Flemming	Scott Saccary	Philip Crowell	Halifax, Nova Scotia
Stuart Thompson	Colten Steele	Travis Colter	Taylor Ardiel	Dartmouth, Nova Scotia
Wayne Tuck Jr.	Chad Allen	Kurt Armstrong	Matt Pretty	Brantford, Ontario
Thomas Ulsrud	Torger Nergård	Christoffer Svae	Håvard Vad Petersson	Oslo, Norway
John Willsey	Jordie Lyon-Hatcher	Connor Lawes	Brendan Acorn	Ottawa, Ontario

=== A event ===
Round of 16
(Quebec) Pierre-Luc Morissette	2
(Ontario) Jordan Chandler	6
(Nova Scotia) Jamie Murphy	10
(Ontario) John Willsey	3

Quarterfinals
(Newfoundland and Labrador) Brad Gushue	5
(Ontario) Jordan Chandler	1
(Ontario) Greg Balsdon	6
(Nova Scotia) Stuart Thompson	3
(Ontario) Glenn Howard	1
(Nova Scotia) Jamie Murphy	5
(Ontario) Mark Bice	6
(South Korea) Kim Chang-min	7

Semifinals
(Newfoundland and Labrador) Brad Gushue	7
(Ontario) Greg Balsdon	4
(Nova Scotia) Jamie Murphy	8
(South Korea) Kim Chang-min	5

Qualifier 1
(Newfoundland and Labrador) Brad Gushue	6
(Nova Scotia) Jamie Murphy	5

Round of 16
(Ontario) Mike McLean	7
(Ontario) Denis Cordick	2
(Ontario) Wayne Tuck Jr.	4
(Ontario) Mike Harris	8

Quarterfinals
(Ontario) John Epping	6
(Ontario) Mike McLean	3
(Ontario) Dayna Deruelle	3
(Ontario) Codey Maus	5
(Norway) Thomas Ulsrud	5
(Ontario) Mike Harris	3
(Manitoba) William Lyburn	6
(Ontario) Tanner Horgan	1

Semifinals
(Ontario) John Epping	6
(Ontario) Codey Maus	7
(Norway) Thomas Ulsrud	5
(Manitoba) William Lyburn	1

Qualifier2
(Ontario) Codey Maus	7
(Norway) Thomas Ulsrud	6

=== B event ===
Round of 16
(Nova Scotia) Stuart Thompson	4
(Quebec) Pierre-Luc Morissette	5
(Ontario) Mark Bice	4
(Ontario) John Wilsey	8

Quarterfinals
(Quebec) Pierre-Luc Morissette	6
(Ontario) Glenn Howard	5
(Ontario) John Wilsey	4
(Ontario) Jordan Chandler	5

Semifinals
(Quebec) Pierre-Luc Morissette	5
(Ontario) Jordan Chandler	6

Qualifier 3
(Ontario) Jordan Chandler	0
(Norway) Thomas Ulsrud	7

Round of 16
(Ontario) Denis Cordick	3
(Ontario) Dayna Deruelle	6
(Ontario) Wayne Tuck Jr.	5
(Ontario) Tanner Horgan	7

Quarterfinals
(Ontario) Dayna Deruelle	5
(Ontario) Mike Harris	7
(Ontario) Mike McLean	4
(Ontario) Tanner Horgan	5

Semifinals
(Ontario) Mike Harris	7
(Ontario) Tanner Horgan	10

Qualifier 4
(Ontario) Tanner Horgan	4
(Nova Scotia) Jamie Murphy	7

Semifinals		Qualifier 5
(Ontario) Greg Balsdon	2
(South Korea) Kim Chang-min	6	(South Korea) Kim Chang-min	1
(Ontario) John Epping	8	(Ontario) John Epping	4
(Manitoba) William Lyburn	3

=== C event ===
Round of 16
(Nova Scotia) Stuart Thompson	3
(Ontario) Mike McLean	5
(Ontario) Dayna Deruelle	5
(Ontario) Mark Bice	1

Quarterfinals
(Ontario) Mike McLean	4
(Ontario) Dayna Deruelle	5

Semifinals
(Ontario) Dayna Deruelle	2
(Manitoba) William Lyburn	6

Qualifier 6
(Ontario) Tanner Horgan	3
(Manitoba) William Lyburn	4

Semifinals		Qualifier 7
(Quebec) Pierre-Luc Morissette	3
(Ontario) Mike Harris	9	(South Korea) Kim Chang-min	2
		(Ontario) Mike Harris	7

Round of 16
(Ontario) Denis Cordick	1
(Ontario) John Wilsey	7
(Ontario) Glenn Howard	6
(Ontario) Wayne Tuck Jr.	7

Quarterfinals
(Ontario) John Wilsey	3
(Ontario) Wayne Tuck Jr.	9

Semifinals
(Ontario) Wayne Tuck Jr.	3
(Ontario) Greg Balsdon	9

Qualifier 8
(Ontario) Greg Balsdon	4
(Ontario) Jordan Chandler	6

=== Playoffs ===
Quarterfinals
(Newfoundland and Labrador) Brad Gushue	7
(Ontario) Jordan Chandler	2
(Nova Scotia) Jamie Murphy	7
(Ontario) John Epping	4
(Ontario) Codey Maus	7
(Ontario) Mike Harris	3
(Norway) Thomas Ulsrud	7
(Manitoba) William Lyburn	6

Semifinals
(Newfoundland and Labrador) Brad Gushue	5
(Nova Scotia) Jamie Murphy	4
(Ontario) Codey Maus	7
(Norway) Thomas Ulsrud	4

Final
(Newfoundland and Labrador) Brad Gushue	4
(Ontario) Codey Maus	2

== Women ==
=== Teams ===
The teams are listed as follows:

Skip	Third	Second	Lead	Locale
Hailey Armstrong	Erica Hopson	Lynsey Longfield	Emma Malfara	Ottawa, Ontario
Jennifer Armstrong	Cathlia Ward	Jillian Babin-Keough	Katie Forward	Fredericton, New Brunswick
Mary-Anne Arsenault	Christina Black	Jennifer Baxter	Jennifer Crouse	Halifax, Nova Scotia
Cathy Auld	Lori Eddy	Katie Cottrill	Jenna Bonner	Toronto, Ontario
Ève Bélisle	Lauren Mann	Patricia Hill	Brittany O'Rourke	Montreal, Quebec
Chrissy Cadorin	Joanne Curtis	Julia Weagle	Sarah Jagger	Thornhill, Ontario
Hollie Duncan	Stephanie LeDrew	Cheryl Kreviazuk	Karen Sagle	Toronto, Ontario
Tracy Fleury	Jennifer Wylie	Jenna Walsh	Amanda Gates	Sudbury, Ontario
Kerry Galusha	Sarah Koltun	Megan Koehler	Shona Barbour	Yellowknife, Northwest Territories
Jacqueline Harrison	Janet Murphy	Stephanie Matheson	Melissa Foster	Mississauga, Ontario
Danielle Inglis	Jessica Corrado	Stephanie Corrado	Cassandra de Groot	Toronto, Ontario
Robyn MacPhee	Sarah Fullerton	Meaghan Hughes	Michelle McQuaid	Charlottetown, Prince Edward Island
Krista McCarville	Kendra Lilly	Ashley Sippala	Sarah Potts	Thunder Bay, Ontario
Sherry Middaugh	Jo-Ann Rizzo	Lee Merklinger	Leigh Armstrong	Coldwater, Ontario
Erin Morrissey	Trish Scharf	Laura LaBonte	Jen Ahde	Ottawa, Ontario
Jestyn Murphy	Riley Sandham	Dannielle Hudson	Hilary Nuhn	Mississauga, Ontario
Breanna Rozon	Melanie Ebach	Kaelyn Gregory	Jillian Page	Guelph, Ontario
Julie Tippin	Chantal Duhaime	Rachelle Vink	Tess Bobbie	Woodstock, Ontario

=== Round Robin Standings ===
Key
Teams to playoffs

Pool A	W	L
(Ontario) Jacqueline Harrison	3	1
(Ontario) Chrissy Cadorin	3	1
(Ontario) Danielle Inglis	2	2
(Ontario) Erin Morrissey	2	2
(Ontario) Cathy Auld	1	3
(Ontario) Breanna Rozon	1	3

Pool B	W	L
(Ontario) Krista McCarville	3	1
(Ontario) Hollie Duncan	3	1
(New Brunswick) Jennifer Armstrong	2	2
(Prince Edward Island) Robyn MacPhee	2	2
(Ontario) Sherry Middaugh	2	2
(Ontario) Jestyn Murphy	0	4

Pool C	W	L
(Ontario) Julie Tippin	4	0
(Ontario) Tracy Fleury	3	1
(Ontario) Hailey Armstrong	2	2
(Northwest Territories) Kerry Galusha	1	3
(Nova Scotia) Mary-Anne Arsenault	1	3
(Quebec) Ève Bélisle	1	3

=== Playoffs ===
Quarterfinals
(Ontario) Julie Tippin	7
(New Brunswick) Jennifer Armstrong	4
(Ontario) Krista McCarville	7
(Ontario) Jacqueline Harrison	5
(Ontario) Hollie Duncan	6
(Ontario) Hailey Armstrong	2
(Ontario) Tracy Fleury	3
(Ontario) Chrissy Cadorin	5

Semifinals
(Ontario) Julie Tippin	6
(Ontario) Krista McCarville	5
(Ontario) Hollie Duncan	6
(Ontario) Chrissy Cadorin	9

Final
(Ontario) Julie Tippin	5
(Ontario) Chrissy Cadorin	2
