= 2026 Stu Sells Toronto Tankard =

- Host city: Toronto, Ontario
- Arena: High Park Club
- Dates: October 8–12
- Men's winner: (Germany) Team Kapp
- Curling club: CC Füssen, Füssen
- Skip: Benjamin Kapp
- Third: Felix Messenzehl
- Second: Johannes Scheuerl
- Lead: Mario Trevisiol
- Coach: Ryan Sherrard
- Finalist: (Manitoba) John Epping
- Women's winner: (Nova Scotia) Team Black
- Curling club: Halifax CC, Halifax
- Skip: Christina Black
- Third: Jill Brothers
- Second: Marlee Powers
- Lead: Lindsey Burgess
- Finalist: (South Korea) Park You-been

The 2026 Stu Sells Toronto Tankard was held from October 8 to 12 at the High Park Club in Toronto. The event was held in a round robin format, with a purse of $29,000 on both the men's side and the women's side. It was the second Stu Sells sponsored event held as part of the 2026–27 season.

== Men ==
=== Teams ===
The teams are listed as follows:

Skip	Third	Second	Lead	Alternate	Locale
Jason Camm	Sam Wills	Wyatt Small	Nathan Steele		Navan, Ontario
John Epping	B. J. Neufeld	Ryan Wiebe	Ian McMillan		Winnipeg, Manitoba
Wesley Forget	John McCutcheon	Robert Currie	Evan Lilly		Toronto, Ontario
Mike Fournier	Charlie Richard	Punit Sthankiya	Graeme Robson		Toronto, Ontario
Daniel Hocevar	Zander Elmes	Joel Matthews	Daniel Del Conte		Toronto, Ontario
Scott Howard	David Mathers	Pat Janssen	Scott Chadwick		Midland, Ontario
William Jewell	Thomas Jack	Willem Hancin	Peter Martyn	Laurence Darcy	Toronto, Ontario
Benjamin Kapp	Felix Messenzehl	Johannes Scheuerl	Mario Trevisiol		Füssen, Germany
Mark Kean	Luke Saunders	Nathan Gray	Ryan Abraham		Halifax, Nova Scotia
Jordan Keon	Fionn Keon	Mike Foster	Nolan Galardo		Richmond Hill, Ontario
Jayden King	Dylan Niepage	Owen Henry	Victor Pietrangelo		Tillsonburg, Ontario
Jacob Lamb	Daniel Vanveghel	Carter Bryant	Eric Fenech		Guelph, Ontario
Mike McEwen	Rylan Kleiter	Joshua Mattern	Trevor Johnson		Saskatoon, Saskatchewan
Sam Mooibroek	Owen Purcell	Scott Mitchell	Gavin Lydiate		Whitby, Ontario
Kibo Mulima	Riley Fung-Ernst	Nate Thomas	Daniel Krowchuk		Waterloo, Ontario
Greg Smith	Carter Small	Nathan Locke	Ben Stringer		St. John's, Newfoundland and Labrador
Ryan Thompson-Brown	Joseph Trieu	Devon Ryan	Marty Thompson		Toronto, Ontario
Nathan Young	Brady Lumley	Matthew Garner	Spencer Dunlop		Oakville, Ontario

=== Round robin standings ===
Final Round Robin Standings

Key
Teams to Playoffs

Pool A	W	L	W–L	PF	PA
(Saskatchewan) Mike McEwen	5	0	–	31	14
(Ontario) Jayden King	4	1	–	31	13
(Ontario) Ryan Thompson-Brown	2	3	1–1	25	21
(Ontario) Daniel Hocevar	2	3	1–1	24	30
(Ontario) Mike Fournier	2	3	1–1	20	31
(Ontario) Wesley Forget	0	5	–	11	33

Pool B	W	L	W–L	PF	PA
(Ontario) Sam Mooibroek	4	1	1–0	35	20
(Manitoba) John Epping	4	1	0–1	30	23
(Nova Scotia) Mark Kean	3	2	–	31	22
(Ontario) Jacob Lamb	2	3	–	26	28
(Ontario) William Jewell	1	4	1–0	23	33
(Newfoundland and Labrador) Greg Smith	1	4	0–1	13	32

Pool C	W	L	W–L	PF	PA
(Germany) Benjamin Kapp	5	0	–	37	9
(Ontario) Jason Camm	3	2	1–0	32	25
(Ontario) Scott Howard	3	2	0–1	27	27
(Ontario) Jordan Keon	2	3	1–0	24	30
(Ontario) Nathan Young	2	3	0–1	28	35
(Ontario) Kibo Mulima	0	5	–	12	34

=== Round Robin Results ===
All draw times are listed in Eastern Time (UTC−04:00).

==== Draw 1 ====
Thursday, October 8, 8:00 am

Sheet 3	1	2	3	4	5	6	7	8	9	Final
(Ontario) Jacob Lamb 🔨	1	0	0	0	0	1	0	2	0	4
(Newfoundland and Labrador) Greg Smith	0	2	0	1	0	0	1	0	1	5

==== Draw 2 ====
Thursday, October 8, 11:15 am

Sheet 2	1	2	3	4	5	6	7	8	Final
(Ontario) Mike Fournier 🔨	4	0	2	0	1	0	0	0	7
(Ontario) Daniel Hocevar	0	1	0	1	0	2	1	1	6

Sheet 4	1	2	3	4	5	6	7	8	Final
(Ontario) Nathan Young 🔨	2	1	1	1	0	1	X	X	6
(Ontario) Kibo Mulima	0	0	0	0	1	0	X	X	1

Sheet 5	1	2	3	4	5	6	7	8	Final
(Germany) Benjamin Kapp	2	0	2	3	0	X	X	X	7
(Ontario) Jordan Keon 🔨	0	1	0	0	1	X	X	X	2

==== Draw 3 ====
Thursday, October 8, 3:30 pm

Sheet 1	1	2	3	4	5	6	7	8	Final
(Ontario) Jason Camm 🔨	0	3	2	1	0	2	X	X	8
(Ontario) Scott Howard	0	0	0	0	2	0	X	X	2

Sheet 2	1	2	3	4	5	6	7	8	Final
(Nova Scotia) Mark Kean	3	0	3	0	2	2	X	X	10
(Ontario) William Jewell 🔨	0	2	0	2	0	0	X	X	4

Sheet 4	1	2	3	4	5	6	7	8	Final
(Ontario) Ryan Thompson-Brown 🔨	0	0	1	1	0	0	X	X	2
(Ontario) Jayden King	1	0	0	0	4	2	X	X	7

==== Draw 4 ====
Thursday, October 8, 6:00 pm

Sheet 2	1	2	3	4	5	6	7	8	Final
(Manitoba) John Epping 🔨	1	0	1	0	2	0	0	2	6
(Newfoundland and Labrador) Greg Smith	0	1	0	1	0	1	0	0	3

Sheet 3	1	2	3	4	5	6	7	8	9	Final
(Ontario) Wesley Forget	0	0	1	1	0	0	2	0	0	4
(Saskatchewan) Mike McEwen 🔨	0	1	0	0	2	0	0	1	2	6

Sheet 5	1	2	3	4	5	6	7	8	Final
(Ontario) Sam Mooibroek 🔨	5	0	1	0	3	X	X	X	9
(Ontario) Jacob Lamb	0	1	0	2	0	X	X	X	3

==== Draw 5 ====
Thursday, October 8, 9:30 pm

Sheet 1	1	2	3	4	5	6	7	8	Final
(Ontario) Mike Fournier	0	0	0	0	0	0	X	X	0
(Ontario) Ryan Thompson-Brown 🔨	1	2	1	0	1	4	X	X	9

Sheet 2	1	2	3	4	5	6	7	8	Final
(Ontario) Nathan Young 🔨	1	0	0	2	0	2	0	X	5
(Ontario) Scott Howard	0	1	1	0	3	0	4	X	9

Sheet 5	1	2	3	4	5	6	7	8	Final
(Ontario) Jayden King	3	0	0	0	0	4	X	X	7
(Ontario) Daniel Hocevar 🔨	0	1	0	0	0	0	X	X	1

==== Draw 6 ====
Friday, October 9, 8:00 am

Sheet 1	1	2	3	4	5	6	7	8	Final
(Germany) Benjamin Kapp 🔨	2	0	1	1	1	1	X	X	6
(Ontario) Kibo Mulima	0	1	0	0	0	0	X	X	1

Sheet 4	1	2	3	4	5	6	7	8	Final
(Ontario) Jason Camm 🔨	2	1	2	0	2	0	X	X	7
(Ontario) Jordan Keon	0	0	0	1	0	2	X	X	3

Sheet 5	1	2	3	4	5	6	7	8	Final
(Ontario) William Jewell	0	0	3	0	0	0	X	X	3
(Manitoba) John Epping 🔨	2	1	0	1	1	3	X	X	8

==== Draw 7 ====
Friday, October 9, 11:15 am

Sheet 1	1	2	3	4	5	6	7	8	Final
(Ontario) Sam Mooibroek 🔨	0	0	1	0	3	1	0	0	5
(Nova Scotia) Mark Kean	1	1	0	2	0	0	1	1	6

Sheet 4	1	2	3	4	5	6	7	8	Final
(Ontario) Daniel Hocevar 🔨	0	1	0	0	0	2	0	X	3
(Saskatchewan) Mike McEwen	2	0	1	1	0	0	3	X	7

==== Draw 8 ====
Friday, October 9, 2:30 pm

Sheet 1	1	2	3	4	5	6	7	8	Final
(Ontario) Nathan Young	0	2	0	0	0	3	0	X	5
(Ontario) Jordan Keon 🔨	2	0	2	3	1	0	1	X	9

Sheet 2	1	2	3	4	5	6	7	8	Final
(Ontario) Wesley Forget	0	0	0	1	0	0	X	X	1
(Ontario) Ryan Thompson-Brown 🔨	2	2	1	0	1	1	X	X	7

Sheet 3	1	2	3	4	5	6	7	8	Final
(Ontario) Mike Fournier	0	1	0	1	0	X	X	X	2
(Ontario) Jayden King 🔨	3	0	1	0	5	X	X	X	9

Sheet 4	1	2	3	4	5	6	7	8	Final
(Ontario) Jacob Lamb 🔨	1	1	0	0	0	2	0	2	6
(Ontario) William Jewell	0	0	1	0	0	0	2	0	3

Sheet 5	1	2	3	4	5	6	7	8	Final
(Ontario) Kibo Mulima	0	3	0	0	0	0	1	X	4
(Ontario) Scott Howard 🔨	1	0	1	1	1	2	0	X	6

==== Draw 10 ====
Friday, October 9, 9:30 pm

Sheet 2	1	2	3	4	5	6	7	8	Final
(Germany) Benjamin Kapp 🔨	2	1	0	2	0	3	X	X	8
(Ontario) Jason Camm	0	0	1	0	0	0	X	X	1

Sheet 5	1	2	3	4	5	6	7	8	Final
(Ontario) Sam Mooibroek 🔨	3	0	0	0	1	2	0	X	6
(Newfoundland and Labrador) Greg Smith	0	0	0	2	0	0	1	X	3

==== Draw 11 ====
Saturday, October 10, 8:00 am

Sheet 1	1	2	3	4	5	6	7	8	Final
(Ontario) Wesley Forget	0	1	0	1	0	1	0	0	3
(Ontario) Daniel Hocevar 🔨	1	0	1	0	0	0	3	2	7

Sheet 2	1	2	3	4	5	6	7	8	Final
(Ontario) Jacob Lamb 🔨	3	1	0	1	0	1	0	0	6
(Manitoba) John Epping	0	0	1	0	3	0	3	1	8

Sheet 5	1	2	3	4	5	6	7	8	Final
(Ontario) Ryan Thompson-Brown 🔨	0	0	0	0	1	0	X	X	1
(Saskatchewan) Mike McEwen	1	1	1	1	0	2	X	X	6

==== Draw 12 ====
Saturday, October 10, 11:15 am

Sheet 3	1	2	3	4	5	6	7	8	Final
(Germany) Benjamin Kapp	1	1	0	2	3	X	X	X	7
(Ontario) Scott Howard 🔨	0	0	1	0	0	X	X	X	1

==== Draw 13 ====
Saturday, October 10, 2:30 pm

Sheet 3	1	2	3	4	5	6	7	8	Final
(Ontario) Kibo Mulima 🔨	0	2	0	0	0	X	X	X	2
(Ontario) Jordan Keon	3	0	2	1	1	X	X	X	7

Sheet 4	1	2	3	4	5	6	7	8	Final
(Nova Scotia) Mark Kean 🔨	3	2	0	3	X	X	X	X	8
(Newfoundland and Labrador) Greg Smith	0	0	1	0	X	X	X	X	1

Sheet 5	1	2	3	4	5	6	7	8	9	Final
(Ontario) Nathan Young	0	2	1	0	2	0	2	0	1	8
(Ontario) Jason Camm 🔨	1	0	0	1	0	2	0	3	0	7

==== Draw 14 ====
Saturday, October 10, 6:00 pm

Sheet 1	1	2	3	4	5	6	7	8	Final
(Ontario) Jayden King 🔨	0	0	0	1	0	1	0	X	2
(Saskatchewan) Mike McEwen	1	1	2	0	1	0	1	X	6

Sheet 3	1	2	3	4	5	6	7	8	Final
(Ontario) Sam Mooibroek	0	2	0	2	0	3	1	X	8
(Ontario) William Jewell 🔨	1	0	1	0	3	0	0	X	5

Sheet 4	1	2	3	4	5	6	7	8	Final
(Ontario) Mike Fournier 🔨	2	0	0	4	1	X	X	X	7
(Ontario) Wesley Forget	0	1	0	0	0	X	X	X	1

==== Draw 15 ====
Saturday, October 10, 9:30 pm

Sheet 2	1	2	3	4	5	6	7	8	Final
(Germany) Benjamin Kapp 🔨	3	0	1	0	3	1	1	X	9
(Ontario) Nathan Young	0	2	0	2	0	0	0	X	4

Sheet 3	1	2	3	4	5	6	7	8	Final
(Nova Scotia) Mark Kean	1	0	0	1	0	1	1	0	4
(Manitoba) John Epping 🔨	0	2	0	0	2	0	0	1	5

==== Draw 16 ====
Sunday, October 11, 8:00 am

Sheet 1	1	2	3	4	5	6	7	8	Final
(Ontario) William Jewell 🔨	3	3	0	1	1	X	X	X	8
(Newfoundland and Labrador) Greg Smith	0	0	1	0	0	X	X	X	1

Sheet 3	1	2	3	4	5	6	7	8	9	Final
(Ontario) Ryan Thompson-Brown	0	2	0	0	0	2	1	1	0	6
(Ontario) Daniel Hocevar 🔨	2	0	1	1	2	0	0	0	1	7

Sheet 4	1	2	3	4	5	6	7	8	Final
(Ontario) Jordan Keon	0	1	0	2	0	0	X	X	3
(Ontario) Scott Howard 🔨	1	0	3	0	2	3	X	X	9

Sheet 5	1	2	3	4	5	6	7	8	Final
(Ontario) Wesley Forget	0	0	1	0	0	1	0	X	2
(Ontario) Jayden King 🔨	3	1	0	0	1	0	1	X	6

==== Draw 17 ====
Sunday, October 11, 11:15 am

Sheet 1	1	2	3	4	5	6	7	8	Final
(Ontario) Jacob Lamb	1	0	1	1	2	0	2	X	7
(Nova Scotia) Mark Kean 🔨	0	1	0	0	0	2	0	X	3

Sheet 2	1	2	3	4	5	6	7	8	Final
(Ontario) Jason Camm 🔨	4	0	0	0	2	0	3	X	9
(Ontario) Kibo Mulima	0	1	0	1	0	2	0	X	4

Sheet 4	1	2	3	4	5	6	7	8	Final
(Ontario) Sam Mooibroek	0	1	0	2	0	0	4	X	7
(Manitoba) John Epping 🔨	0	0	1	0	0	2	0	X	3

Sheet 5	1	2	3	4	5	6	7	8	Final
(Ontario) Mike Fournier 🔨	0	1	1	0	1	0	1	X	4
(Saskatchewan) Mike McEwen	2	0	0	3	0	1	0	X	6

=== Playoffs ===
Quarterfinals
1	(Saskatchewan) Mike McEwen	8
8	(Nova Scotia) Mark Kean	3
4	(Ontario) Sam Mooibroek	5
5	(Manitoba) John Epping	6
3	(Ontario) Jayden King	9
6	(Ontario) Jason Camm	2
2	(Germany) Benjamin Kapp	4
7	(Ontario) Scott Howard	3

Semifinals
1	(Saskatchewan) Mike McEwen	3
5	(Manitoba) John Epping	4
3	(Ontario) Jayden King	3
2	(Germany) Benjamin Kapp	9

Final
5	(Manitoba) John Epping	5
2	(Germany) Benjamin Kapp	6

==== Quarterfinals ====
Sunday, October 11, 6:00 pm

Sheet 1	1	2	3	4	5	6	7	8	Final
(Ontario) Sam Mooibroek	0	2	0	0	1	0	1	1	5
(Manitoba) John Epping 🔨	2	0	0	2	0	2	0	0	6

Sheet 2	1	2	3	4	5	6	7	8	9	Final
(Germany) Benjamin Kapp 🔨	1	0	0	1	0	1	0	0	1	4
(Ontario) Scott Howard	0	1	0	0	1	0	0	1	0	3

Sheet 3	1	2	3	4	5	6	7	8	Final
(Saskatchewan) Mike McEwen 🔨	0	0	1	3	1	0	3	X	8
(Nova Scotia) Mark Kean	0	0	0	0	0	3	0	X	3

Sheet 4	1	2	3	4	5	6	7	8	Final
(Ontario) Jayden King 🔨	2	0	3	0	2	2	X	X	9
(Ontario) Jason Camm	0	1	0	1	0	0	X	X	2

==== Semifinals ====
Monday, October 12, 9:00 am

Sheet 3	1	2	3	4	5	6	7	8	Final
(Ontario) Jayden King	0	1	0	2	0	0	X	X	3
(Germany) Benjamin Kapp 🔨	1	0	3	0	2	3	X	X	9

Sheet 4	1	2	3	4	5	6	7	8	Final
(Saskatchewan) Mike McEwen 🔨	1	0	1	0	1	0	0	0	3
(Manitoba) John Epping	0	1	0	1	0	0	1	1	4

==== Final ====
Monday, October 12, 12:00 pm

Sheet 2	1	2	3	4	5	6	7	8	9	Final
(Manitoba) John Epping	0	1	0	0	1	0	2	1	0	5
(Germany) Benjamin Kapp 🔨	1	0	2	1	0	1	0	0	1	6

== Women ==
=== Teams ===
The teams are listed as follows:

Skip	Third	Second	Lead	Alternate	Locale
Hailey Armstrong	Melissa Gannon	Andréanne Janelle-Gravel	Pamela Nugent	Sarah Throop	Montreal, Quebec
Christina Black	Jill Brothers	Marlee Powers	Lindsey Burgess		Halifax, Nova Scotia
Cassidy Blades	Stephanie Atherton	Annalise MacNutt	Lily Mitchell		Halifax, Nova Scotia
Kira Brunton	Kendra Lilly	Jamie Smith	Lauren Rajala		Sudbury, Ontario
Grace Cave	Emily Deschenes	Madison Fisher	Melanie Ebach		North Dundas, Ontario
Mélodie Forsythe	Rebecca Watson	Carly Smith	Jenna Campbell		Fredericton, New Brunswick
Carly Howard	Grace Holyoke	Emma Artichuk	Alice Holyoke		Toronto, Ontario
Kim Eun-jung	Park Han-byul	Bang Yu-jin	Kim Hae-jeong	Kim Su-hyeon	Uiseong, South Korea
Katelin Langford	Madison Onischke	Valorie Martin	Madeleine Foley		Uxbridge, Ontario
Cailey Locke	Hayley Gushue	Emily Neary	Sitaye Penney	Olivia McDonah	St. John's, Newfoundland and Labrador
Jenny Madden	Bridget Whynot	Emily Parkinson	Jessica Guilbault		Ottawa, Ontario
Sherry Middaugh	Kelly Middaugh	Emily Middaugh	Megan Smith		Niagara Falls, Ontario
Park You-been	Park Seo-jin	Yang Tae-i	Kim Su-jin		Chuncheon, South Korea
Chelsea Principi	Lauren Peskett	Brenda Chapman	Keira McLaughlin		Niagara Falls, Ontario
Breanna Rozon	Chrissy Cadorin	Celeste Gauthier	Jillian Page		Brantford, Ontario
Amanda Smith	Janice Pang	Danielle Serra	Nadia Jouaneh	Maegan Daffern	Toronto, Ontario
Taylour Stevens	Maria Fitzgerald	Rebecca Regan	Cate Fitzgerald		Halifax, Nova Scotia
Dominique Vivier	Ava Acres	Paige Bown	Sadie McCutcheon		Navan, Ontario

=== Round robin standings ===
Final Round Robin Standings

Key
Teams to Playoffs

Pool A	W	L	W–L	PF	PA
(Ontario) Kira Brunton	5	0	–	43	12
(Ontario) Chelsea Principi	4	1	–	30	17
(Nova Scotia) Cassidy Blades	2	3	1–0	26	31
(Ontario) Breanna Rozon	2	3	0–1	23	24
(Ontario) Dominique Vivier	1	4	1–0	16	35
(Ontario) Katelin Langford	1	4	0–1	19	38

Pool B	W	L	W–L	PF	PA
(South Korea) Park You-been	5	0	–	41	19
(South Korea) Kim Eun-jung	4	1	–	35	26
(Ontario) Grace Cave	2	3	1–0	27	31
(New Brunswick) Mélodie Forsythe	2	3	0–1	25	29
(Ontario) Jenny Madden	1	4	1–0	20	32
(Nova Scotia) Taylour Stevens	1	4	0–1	24	35

Pool C	W	L	W–L	PF	PA
(Nova Scotia) Christina Black	5	0	–	40	16
(Quebec) Hailey Armstrong	4	1	–	23	23
(Ontario) Sherry Middaugh	3	2	–	30	23
(Ontario) Carly Howard	2	3	–	22	28
(Newfoundland and Labrador) Cailey Locke	1	4	–	22	26
(Ontario) Amanda Smith	0	5	–	15	36

=== Round Robin Results ===
All draw times are listed in Eastern Time (UTC−04:00).

==== Draw 1 ====
Thursday, October 8, 8:00 am

Sheet 1	1	2	3	4	5	6	7	8	Final
(Nova Scotia) Christina Black 🔨	0	0	1	1	0	3	2	X	7
(Newfoundland and Labrador) Cailey Locke	0	1	0	0	4	0	0	X	5

Sheet 2	1	2	3	4	5	6	7	8	Final
(New Brunswick) Mélodie Forsythe	0	0	1	0	1	0	2	X	4
(Ontario) Grace Cave 🔨	2	1	0	1	0	3	0	X	7

Sheet 4	1	2	3	4	5	6	7	8	Final
(Ontario) Amanda Smith	0	0	0	0	1	1	0	0	2
(Quebec) Hailey Armstrong 🔨	0	1	0	1	0	0	1	1	4

Sheet 5	1	2	3	4	5	6	7	8	Final
(Ontario) Breanna Rozon	1	0	0	2	0	0	0	0	3
(Ontario) Kira Brunton 🔨	0	0	1	0	1	1	2	2	7

==== Draw 2 ====
Thursday, October 8, 11:15 am

Sheet 1	1	2	3	4	5	6	7	8	Final
(Ontario) Katelin Langford 🔨	1	0	0	1	1	0	2	1	6
(Ontario) Dominique Vivier	0	4	1	0	0	2	0	0	7

Sheet 3	1	2	3	4	5	6	7	8	Final
(Ontario) Chelsea Principi 🔨	1	3	0	0	0	2	0	1	7
(Nova Scotia) Cassidy Blades	0	0	2	0	1	0	1	0	4

==== Draw 3 ====
Thursday, October 8, 3:30 pm

Sheet 3	1	2	3	4	5	6	7	8	Final
(Ontario) Sherry Middaugh	1	0	0	2	1	1	4	X	9
(Ontario) Carly Howard 🔨	0	0	1	0	0	0	0	X	1

Sheet 5	1	2	3	4	5	6	7	8	Final
(Ontario) Jenny Madden 🔨	0	0	0	1	1	2	1	2	7
(Nova Scotia) Taylour Stevens	1	1	1	0	0	0	0	0	3

==== Draw 4 ====
Thursday, October 8, 6:00 pm

Sheet 1	1	2	3	4	5	6	7	8	Final
(South Korea) Park You-been	0	0	2	0	3	4	0	2	11
(South Korea) Kim Eun-jung 🔨	1	1	0	3	0	0	2	0	7

Sheet 4	1	2	3	4	5	6	7	8	Final
(Nova Scotia) Cassidy Blades 🔨	2	0	0	2	0	1	0	0	5
(Ontario) Katelin Langford	0	1	1	0	1	0	2	1	6

==== Draw 5 ====
Thursday, October 8, 9:30 pm

Sheet 3	1	2	3	4	5	6	7	8	Final
(Ontario) Grace Cave 🔨	1	0	1	0	2	0	2	1	7
(Ontario) Jenny Madden	0	3	0	2	0	0	0	0	5

Sheet 4	1	2	3	4	5	6	7	8	Final
(Ontario) Chelsea Principi	0	0	0	3	1	1	X	X	5
(Ontario) Dominique Vivier 🔨	0	0	0	0	0	0	X	X	0

==== Draw 6 ====
Friday, October 9, 8:00 am

Sheet 2	1	2	3	4	5	6	7	8	Final
(Newfoundland and Labrador) Cailey Locke 🔨	2	2	0	0	1	0	0	2	7
(Ontario) Amanda Smith	0	0	1	1	0	1	1	0	4

Sheet 3	1	2	3	4	5	6	7	8	9	Final
(Nova Scotia) Taylour Stevens 🔨	0	3	0	0	3	0	0	1	0	7
(South Korea) Kim Eun-jung	1	0	3	0	0	3	0	0	1	8

==== Draw 7 ====
Friday, October 9, 11:15 am

Sheet 2	1	2	3	4	5	6	7	8	Final
(Ontario) Breanna Rozon	1	0	0	2	2	0	0	0	5
(Nova Scotia) Cassidy Blades 🔨	0	2	2	0	0	1	0	1	6

Sheet 3	1	2	3	4	5	6	7	8	Final
(New Brunswick) Mélodie Forsythe 🔨	0	1	0	0	2	0	1	0	4
(South Korea) Park You-been	0	0	2	1	0	2	0	2	7

Sheet 5	1	2	3	4	5	6	7	8	Final
(Quebec) Hailey Armstrong 🔨	1	0	0	1	0	2	0	2	6
(Ontario) Carly Howard	0	2	0	0	1	0	2	0	5

==== Draw 9 ====
Friday, October 9, 6:00 pm

Sheet 1	1	2	3	4	5	6	7	8	Final
(Ontario) Grace Cave	0	2	0	1	1	2	0	0	6
(Nova Scotia) Taylour Stevens 🔨	1	0	3	0	0	0	2	1	7

Sheet 2	1	2	3	4	5	6	7	8	Final
(Ontario) Chelsea Principi	0	2	5	0	3	0	X	X	10
(Ontario) Katelin Langford 🔨	1	0	0	1	0	1	X	X	3

Sheet 3	1	2	3	4	5	6	7	8	Final
(Nova Scotia) Christina Black 🔨	2	1	0	0	5	X	X	X	8
(Ontario) Carly Howard	0	0	1	1	0	X	X	X	2

Sheet 4	1	2	3	4	5	6	7	8	Final
(New Brunswick) Mélodie Forsythe	0	0	0	2	0	0	1	X	3
(South Korea) Kim Eun-jung 🔨	0	1	1	0	2	2	0	X	6

Sheet 5	1	2	3	4	5	6	7	8	Final
(Ontario) Sherry Middaugh 🔨	3	0	0	0	2	3	0	X	8
(Ontario) Amanda Smith	0	0	1	1	0	0	2	X	4

==== Draw 10 ====
Friday, October 9, 9:30 pm

Sheet 1	1	2	3	4	5	6	7	8	Final
(Ontario) Kira Brunton 🔨	2	0	3	0	4	X	X	X	9
(Nova Scotia) Cassidy Blades	0	1	0	2	0	X	X	X	3

Sheet 3	1	2	3	4	5	6	7	8	Final
(Ontario) Breanna Rozon	0	0	1	1	2	0	1	X	5
(Ontario) Dominique Vivier 🔨	0	1	0	0	0	1	0	X	2

Sheet 4	1	2	3	4	5	6	7	8	Final
(South Korea) Park You-been	1	4	0	2	1	X	X	X	8
(Ontario) Jenny Madden 🔨	0	0	2	0	0	X	X	X	2

==== Draw 11 ====
Saturday, October 10, 8:00 am

Sheet 3	1	2	3	4	5	6	7	8	Final
(Newfoundland and Labrador) Cailey Locke	2	0	0	0	1	0	1	X	4
(Quebec) Hailey Armstrong 🔨	0	1	0	1	0	4	0	X	6

Sheet 4	1	2	3	4	5	6	7	8	Final
(Nova Scotia) Christina Black 🔨	0	2	0	2	3	0	2	X	9
(Ontario) Sherry Middaugh	1	0	3	0	0	1	0	X	5

==== Draw 12 ====
Saturday, October 10, 11:15 am

Sheet 1	1	2	3	4	5	6	7	8	Final
(Ontario) Amanda Smith 🔨	0	0	2	0	0	0	0	X	2
(Ontario) Carly Howard	0	1	0	1	1	3	3	X	9

Sheet 2	1	2	3	4	5	6	7	8	Final
(Ontario) Kira Brunton	2	0	3	0	0	2	4	X	11
(Ontario) Dominique Vivier 🔨	0	2	0	1	0	0	0	X	3

Sheet 4	1	2	3	4	5	6	7	8	Final
(Ontario) Breanna Rozon	0	4	0	1	2	0	0	X	7
(Ontario) Katelin Langford 🔨	1	0	1	0	0	1	1	X	4

Sheet 5	1	2	3	4	5	6	7	8	Final
(Ontario) Grace Cave 🔨	0	2	0	0	0	1	0	X	3
(South Korea) Kim Eun-jung	1	0	2	1	1	0	1	X	6

==== Draw 13 ====
Saturday, October 10, 2:30 pm

Sheet 1	1	2	3	4	5	6	7	8	Final
(New Brunswick) Mélodie Forsythe	0	0	3	0	1	1	0	1	6
(Ontario) Jenny Madden 🔨	1	1	0	1	0	0	1	0	4

Sheet 2	1	2	3	4	5	6	7	8	Final
(South Korea) Park You-been 🔨	1	1	0	1	0	0	0	3	6
(Nova Scotia) Taylour Stevens	0	0	0	0	2	0	0	0	2

==== Draw 14 ====
Saturday, October 10, 6:00 pm

Sheet 2	1	2	3	4	5	6	7	8	Final
(Nova Scotia) Christina Black 🔨	1	2	0	2	3	X	X	X	8
(Quebec) Hailey Armstrong	0	0	1	0	0	X	X	X	1

Sheet 5	1	2	3	4	5	6	7	8	Final
(Ontario) Sherry Middaugh	1	0	1	0	0	1	1	0	4
(Newfoundland and Labrador) Cailey Locke 🔨	0	1	0	1	0	0	0	1	3

==== Draw 15 ====
Saturday, October 10, 9:30 pm

Sheet 1	1	2	3	4	5	6	7	8	Final
(Ontario) Chelsea Principi	0	0	2	0	1	0	0	X	3
(Ontario) Kira Brunton 🔨	1	0	0	2	0	3	1	X	7

Sheet 4	1	2	3	4	5	6	7	8	Final
(New Brunswick) Mélodie Forsythe	0	0	4	0	0	0	2	2	8
(Nova Scotia) Taylour Stevens 🔨	0	0	0	2	2	1	0	0	5

Sheet 5	1	2	3	4	5	6	7	8	Final
(Nova Scotia) Cassidy Blades 🔨	0	0	0	2	0	2	3	1	8
(Ontario) Dominique Vivier	1	1	0	0	2	0	0	0	4

==== Draw 16 ====
Sunday, October 11, 8:00 am

Sheet 2	1	2	3	4	5	6	7	8	Final
(Ontario) Jenny Madden	0	1	0	1	X	X	X	X	2
(South Korea) Kim Eun-jung 🔨	3	0	5	0	X	X	X	X	8

==== Draw 17 ====
Sunday, October 11, 11:15 am

Sheet 3	1	2	3	4	5	6	7	8	Final
(Nova Scotia) Christina Black 🔨	0	2	0	2	0	4	0	X	8
(Ontario) Amanda Smith	0	0	1	0	1	0	1	X	3

==== Draw 18 ====
Sunday, October 11, 2:30 pm

Sheet 1	1	2	3	4	5	6	7	8	Final
(Ontario) Sherry Middaugh	0	0	1	0	2	1	0	0	4
(Quebec) Hailey Armstrong 🔨	1	1	0	2	0	0	1	1	6

Sheet 2	1	2	3	4	5	6	7	8	Final
(Newfoundland and Labrador) Cailey Locke 🔨	0	0	0	1	0	2	0	X	3
(Ontario) Carly Howard	0	0	2	0	2	0	1	X	5

Sheet 3	1	2	3	4	5	6	7	8	Final
(Ontario) Kira Brunton 🔨	1	1	3	2	2	X	X	X	9
(Ontario) Katelin Langford	0	0	0	0	0	X	X	X	0

Sheet 4	1	2	3	4	5	6	7	8	Final
(Ontario) Grace Cave 🔨	1	2	0	0	0	1	X	X	4
(South Korea) Park You-been	0	0	4	2	3	0	X	X	9

Sheet 5	1	2	3	4	5	6	7	8	Final
(Ontario) Breanna Rozon	0	0	0	0	1	0	2	0	3
(Ontario) Chelsea Principi 🔨	1	0	1	0	0	2	0	1	5

=== Playoffs ===
Quarterfinals
1	(Nova Scotia) Christina Black	7
8	(Ontario) Grace Cave	5
4	(South Korea) Kim Eun-jung	5
5	(Quebec) Hailey Armstrong	4
3	(Ontario) Kira Brunton	3
6	(Ontario) Chelsea Principi	5
2	(South Korea) Park You-been	8
7	(Ontario) Sherry Middaugh	3

Semifinals
1	(Nova Scotia) Christina Black	6
4	(South Korea) Kim Eun-jung	3
6	(Ontario) Chelsea Principi	2
2	(South Korea) Park You-been	6

Final
1	(Nova Scotia) Christina Black	6
2	(South Korea) Park You-been	5

==== Quarterfinals ====
Sunday, October 11, 9:30 pm

Sheet 1	1	2	3	4	5	6	7	8	Final
(Ontario) Kira Brunton 🔨	0	0	1	0	0	2	0	0	3
(Ontario) Chelsea Principi	1	1	0	1	0	0	1	1	5

Sheet 2	1	2	3	4	5	6	7	8	Final
(Nova Scotia) Christina Black 🔨	2	0	0	1	0	3	0	1	7
(Ontario) Grace Cave	0	0	2	0	2	0	1	0	5

Sheet 3	1	2	3	4	5	6	7	8	Final
(South Korea) Park You-been 🔨	1	2	1	0	2	0	2	X	8
(Ontario) Sherry Middaugh	0	0	0	2	0	1	0	X	3

Sheet 4	1	2	3	4	5	6	7	8	Final
(South Korea) Kim Eun-jung	0	0	1	1	1	0	0	2	5
(Quebec) Hailey Armstrong 🔨	1	2	0	0	0	1	0	0	4

==== Semifinals ====
Monday, October 12, 12:00 pm

Sheet 3	1	2	3	4	5	6	7	8	Final
(Nova Scotia) Christina Black 🔨	1	0	2	0	2	1	0	X	6
(South Korea) Kim Eun-jung	0	1	0	1	0	0	1	X	3

Sheet 4	1	2	3	4	5	6	7	8	Final
(Ontario) Chelsea Principi	0	0	0	1	0	1	0	0	2
(South Korea) Park You-been 🔨	0	1	0	0	2	0	2	1	6

==== Final ====
Monday, October 12, 3:30 pm

Sheet 2	1	2	3	4	5	6	7	8	Final
(Nova Scotia) Christina Black	0	1	0	1	0	1	2	1	6
(South Korea) Park You-been 🔨	2	0	2	0	1	0	0	0	5
