= 2012 Canadian Open of Curling =

Grand Slam of Curling event

- Host city: Kelowna, British Columbia
- Arena: Prospera Place
- Dates: December 12–16
- Winner: (Ontario) Glenn Howard
- Curling club: Coldwater & District CC, Coldwater
- Skip: Glenn Howard
- Third: Wayne Middaugh
- Second: Brent Laing
- Lead: Craig Savill
- Finalist: (Ontario) Brad Jacobs

The 2012 Canadian Open of Curling was held from December 12 to 16 at Prospera Place in Kelowna, British Columbia as part of the 2012–13 World Curling Tour. The event was the second men's Grand Slam event of the season. The event was held in a round robin format, and the purse for the event was CAD$100,000. In the final, Glenn Howard won his second Canadian Open title and his eleventh Grand Slam title with a win over Brad Jacobs, clinching the victory with a score of 3–1 after a steal in the final end.

== Teams ==
The teams are listed as follows:

Skip	Third	Second	Lead	Locale
Jim Cotter	Jason Gunnlaugson	Tyrel Griffith	Rick Sawatsky	Kelowna/Vernon, British Columbia
Benoît Schwarz (fourth)	Peter de Cruz (skip)	Dominik Märki	Valentin Tanner	Geneva, Switzerland
John Epping	Scott Bailey	Scott Howard	David Mathers	Toronto, Ontario
Rob Fowler	Allan Lyburn	Richard Daneault	Derek Samagalski	Brandon, Manitoba
Brad Gushue	Adam Casey	Brett Gallant	Geoff Walker	St. John's, Newfoundland and Labrador
Brent Ross (fourth)	Jake Higgs (skip)	Codey Maus	Bill Buchanan	Harriston, Ontario
Glenn Howard	Wayne Middaugh	Brent Laing	Craig Savill	Coldwater, Ontario
Brad Jacobs	Ryan Fry	E. J. Harnden	Ryan Harnden	Sault Ste. Marie, Ontario
Mark Kean	Travis Fanset	Patrick Janssen	Tim March	Toronto, Ontario
Kevin Koe	Pat Simmons	Carter Rycroft	D. J. Kidby (Note: Kidby subbed in for Nolan Thiessen, who was at home with his expectant wife.)	Calgary, Alberta
Steve Laycock	Kirk Muyres	Colton Flasch	Dallan Muyres	Saskatoon, Saskatchewan
William Lyburn	James Kirkness	Alex Forrest	Tyler Forrest	Winnipeg, Manitoba
Mike McEwen	B. J. Neufeld	Matt Wozniak	Denni Neufeld	Winnipeg, Manitoba
Jean-Michel Ménard	Martin Crête	Éric Sylvain	Philippe Ménard	Quebec City, Quebec
John Morris (Note: Morris skipped in place of Kevin Martin, who was scheduled to undergo surgery for a hernia. Joe Frans will sub in for Martin.)	Joe Frans	Marc Kennedy	Ben Hebert	Edmonton, Alberta
Brent Pierce	Jeff Richard	Kevin Recksiedler	Grant Dezura	New Westminster, British Columbia
Robert Rumfeldt	Adam Spencer	Scott Hodgson	Greg Robinson	Guelph, Ontario
Jeff Stoughton	Jon Mead	Reid Carruthers	Mark Nichols	Winnipeg, Manitoba

== Round robin standings ==
Final Round Robin Standings

Key
Teams to Playoffs
Teams to Tiebreakers

Pool A	W	L
(Ontario) Glenn Howard	5	0
(Ontario) Brad Jacobs	4	1
(Manitoba) Jeff Stoughton	3	2
(Quebec) Jean-Michel Ménard	1	4
(Ontario) Robert Rumfeldt	1	4
(Manitoba) William Lyburn	1	4

Pool B	W	L
(Newfoundland and Labrador) Brad Gushue	3	2
(Alberta) Kevin Koe	3	2
(British Columbia) Jim Cotter	3	2
(Ontario) Jake Higgs	3	2
(Saskatchewan) Steve Laycock	2	3
(Ontario) John Epping	1	4

Pool C	W	L
(Manitoba) Mike McEwen	4	1
(Ontario) Mark Kean	3	2
(Manitoba) Rob Fowler	3	2
(Alberta) John Morris	2	3
(British Columbia) Brent Pierce	2	3
(Switzerland) Peter de Cruz	1	4

== Round robin results ==
All draw times listed in Pacific Standard Time (UTC−8).

=== Draw 1 ===
Wednesday, December 12, 7:00 pm

Sheet A	1	2	3	4	5	6	7	8	Final
(Ontario) Glenn Howard 🔨	2	0	3	0	0	1	X	X	6
(Ontario) Brad Jacobs	0	1	0	0	1	0	X	X	2

Sheet B	1	2	3	4	5	6	7	8	9	Final
(Alberta) Kevin Koe 🔨	1	1	0	0	0	2	0	1	0	5
(British Columbia) Jim Cotter	0	0	2	1	0	0	2	0	1	6

Sheet C	1	2	3	4	5	6	7	8	Final
(Alberta) John Morris 🔨	2	0	0	5	1	1	X	X	9
(Switzerland) Peter de Cruz	0	0	1	0	0	0	X	X	1

Sheet D	1	2	3	4	5	6	7	8	Final
(Ontario) John Epping	0	0	0	3	0	1	0	0	4
(Newfoundland and Labrador) Brad Gushue 🔨	1	0	1	0	2	0	2	1	7

Sheet E	1	2	3	4	5	6	7	8	Final
(Manitoba) Jeff Stoughton 🔨	0	1	1	0	4	0	1	X	7
(Manitoba) William Lyburn	0	0	0	1	0	1	0	X	2

=== Draw 2 ===
Thursday, December 13, 9:00 am

Sheet A	1	2	3	4	5	6	7	8	Final
(Manitoba) Rob Fowler 🔨	0	1	0	0	2	1	0	X	4
(British Columbia) Brent Pierce	2	0	2	0	0	0	4	X	8

Sheet B	1	2	3	4	5	6	7	8	Final
(Manitoba) Mike McEwen	4	0	1	0	0	0	1	X	6
(Ontario) Mark Kean	0	1	0	1	0	1	0	X	3

Sheet C	1	2	3	4	5	6	7	8	Final
(Ontario) Robert Rumfeldt 🔨	0	1	1	0	1	0	0	2	5
(Quebec) Jean-Michel Ménard	0	0	0	1	0	1	2	0	4

Sheet D	1	2	3	4	5	6	7	8	Final
(Saskatchewan) Steve Laycock	0	1	2	0	X	X	X	X	3
(Ontario) Jake Higgs 🔨	4	0	0	6	X	X	X	X	10

Sheet E	1	2	3	4	5	6	7	8	Final
(British Columbia) Jim Cotter 🔨	1	0	0	0	1	0	2	0	4
(Newfoundland and Labrador) Brad Gushue	0	0	2	1	0	1	0	1	5

=== Draw 3 ===
Thursday, December 13, 12:30 pm

Sheet A	1	2	3	4	5	6	7	8	Final
(Quebec) Jean-Michel Ménard 🔨	4	0	0	2	0	1	0	1	8
(Manitoba) William Lyburn	0	1	1	0	1	0	2	0	5

Sheet B	1	2	3	4	5	6	7	8	9	Final
(Ontario) John Epping 🔨	0	2	0	1	0	1	0	1	0	5
(Saskatchewan) Steve Laycock	1	0	1	0	2	0	1	0	1	6

Sheet C	1	2	3	4	5	6	7	8	Final
(Ontario) Glenn Howard 🔨	2	2	0	2	0	0	1	X	7
(Manitoba) Jeff Stoughton	0	0	1	0	1	1	0	X	3

Sheet D	1	2	3	4	5	6	7	8	Final
(Ontario) Brad Jacobs 🔨	1	0	2	0	2	0	0	1	6
(Ontario) Robert Rumfeldt	0	1	0	2	0	1	1	0	5

Sheet E	1	2	3	4	5	6	7	8	Final
(Ontario) Jake Higgs 🔨	0	0	2	0	2	0	0	0	4
(Alberta) Kevin Koe	0	1	0	2	0	1	1	1	6

=== Draw 4 ===
Thursday, December 13, 4:30 pm

Sheet A	1	2	3	4	5	6	7	8	Final
(Manitoba) Mike McEwen	1	1	0	0	1	0	0	X	3
(Switzerland) Peter de Cruz 🔨	0	0	0	2	0	0	3	X	5

Sheet B	1	2	3	4	5	6	7	8	Final
(Manitoba) Jeff Stoughton 🔨	0	1	0	1	0	1	0	X	3
(Ontario) Brad Jacobs	1	0	1	0	1	0	2	X	5

Sheet C	1	2	3	4	5	6	7	8	9	Final
(Ontario) John Epping 🔨	4	0	0	0	1	0	0	1	0	6
(Alberta) Kevin Koe	0	2	0	1	0	3	0	0	1	7

Sheet D	1	2	3	4	5	6	7	8	Final
(Alberta) John Morris 🔨	2	0	3	0	1	0	X	X	6
(British Columbia) Brent Pierce	0	1	0	1	0	1	X	X	3

Sheet E	1	2	3	4	5	6	7	8	Final
(Manitoba) Rob Fowler 🔨	1	0	1	0	2	0	0	1	5
(Ontario) Mark Kean	0	1	0	1	0	0	2	0	4

=== Draw 5 ===
Thursday, December 13, 8:00 pm

Sheet A	1	2	3	4	5	6	7	8	Final
(Newfoundland and Labrador) Brad Gushue 🔨	1	0	1	0	1	2	2	X	7
(Saskatchewan) Steve Laycock	0	2	0	1	0	0	0	X	3

Sheet B	1	2	3	4	5	6	7	8	Final
(British Columbia) Brent Pierce	0	1	1	2	1	0	0	1	6
(Switzerland) Peter de Cruz 🔨	2	0	0	0	0	0	1	0	3

Sheet C	1	2	3	4	5	6	7	8	Final
(Alberta) John Morris 🔨	1	0	2	0	0	1	0	X	4
(Manitoba) Rob Fowler	0	1	0	3	0	0	3	X	7

Sheet D	1	2	3	4	5	6	7	8	Final
(British Columbia) Jim Cotter	0	1	0	0	0	4	2	0	7
(Ontario) Jake Higgs 🔨	1	0	0	3	1	0	0	1	6

Sheet E	1	2	3	4	5	6	7	8	Final
(Ontario) Glenn Howard	0	1	2	0	4	1	X	X	8
(Manitoba) William Lyburn 🔨	1	0	0	1	0	0	X	X	2

=== Draw 6 ===
Friday, December 14, 9:00 am

Sheet A	1	2	3	4	5	6	7	8	Final
(Manitoba) Mike McEwen 🔨	3	0	1	0	0	1	1	1	7
(British Columbia) Brent Pierce	0	2	0	1	1	0	0	0	4

Sheet B	1	2	3	4	5	6	7	8	Final
(Manitoba) William Lyburn 🔨	1	1	0	0	2	0	0	0	4
(Ontario) Robert Rumfeldt	0	0	0	1	0	0	1	1	3

Sheet C	1	2	3	4	5	6	7	8	Final
(Ontario) Mark Kean 🔨	0	1	0	2	0	0	1	1	5
(Switzerland) Peter de Cruz	0	0	1	0	2	0	0	0	3

Sheet D	1	2	3	4	5	6	7	8	Final
(Alberta) Kevin Koe	0	1	0	1	0	0	2	X	4
(Saskatchewan) Steve Laycock 🔨	2	0	1	0	2	1	0	X	6

Sheet E	1	2	3	4	5	6	7	8	Final
(Ontario) Brad Jacobs 🔨	2	0	3	0	1	0	0	1	7
(Quebec) Jean-Michel Ménard	0	2	0	1	0	2	0	0	5

=== Draw 7 ===
Friday, December 14, 12:30 pm

Sheet A	1	2	3	4	5	6	7	8	Final
(Alberta) John Morris 🔨	1	0	0	0	2	1	0	0	4
(Ontario) Mark Kean	0	0	0	4	0	0	1	1	6

Sheet B	1	2	3	4	5	6	7	8	Final
(Ontario) Glenn Howard 🔨	3	0	3	0	2	X	X	X	8
(Quebec) Jean-Michel Ménard	0	0	0	2	0	X	X	X	2

Sheet C	1	2	3	4	5	6	7	8	Final
(Manitoba) Mike McEwen	0	1	2	0	0	2	0	5	10
(Manitoba) Rob Fowler 🔨	2	0	0	2	0	0	2	0	6

Sheet D	1	2	3	4	5	6	7	8	9	Final
(Manitoba) Jeff Stoughton	0	2	1	0	1	0	0	2	1	7
(Ontario) Robert Rumfeldt 🔨	2	0	0	1	0	2	1	0	0	6

Sheet E	1	2	3	4	5	6	7	8	Final
(Ontario) Jake Higgs 🔨	1	0	1	0	2	0	3	X	7
(Newfoundland and Labrador) Brad Gushue	0	1	0	1	0	2	0	X	4

=== Draw 8 ===
Friday, December 14, 4:00 pm

Sheet A	1	2	3	4	5	6	7	8	Final
(Ontario) John Epping 🔨	0	1	0	2	0	1	1	0	5
(Ontario) Jake Higgs	3	0	2	0	1	0	0	2	8

Sheet B	1	2	3	4	5	6	7	8	Final
(Newfoundland and Labrador) Brad Gushue	1	0	1	0	0	1	0	1	4
(Alberta) Kevin Koe 🔨	0	2	0	2	0	0	1	0	5

Sheet C	1	2	3	4	5	6	7	8	Final
(Ontario) Brad Jacobs 🔨	2	0	0	3	0	1	0	2	8
(Manitoba) William Lyburn	0	0	2	0	2	0	1	0	5

Sheet D	1	2	3	4	5	6	7	8	Final
(Switzerland) Peter de Cruz 🔨	2	0	1	0	0	1	0	X	4
(Manitoba) Rob Fowler	0	3	0	2	0	0	2	X	7

Sheet E	1	2	3	4	5	6	7	8	Final
(British Columbia) Jim Cotter 🔨	2	0	2	0	1	0	0	2	7
(Saskatchewan) Steve Laycock	0	2	0	1	0	1	1	0	5

=== Draw 9 ===
Friday, December 14, 8:00 pm

Sheet A	1	2	3	4	5	6	7	8	Final
(Manitoba) Jeff Stoughton	0	2	1	0	1	1	2	X	7
(Quebec) Jean-Michel Ménard 🔨	1	0	0	3	0	0	0	X	4

Sheet B	1	2	3	4	5	6	7	8	9	Final
(British Columbia) Brent Pierce 🔨	0	1	0	3	0	0	2	0	0	6
(Ontario) Mark Kean	1	0	2	0	1	1	0	1	1	7

Sheet C	1	2	3	4	5	6	7	8	Final
(Ontario) John Epping 🔨	0	0	2	0	1	1	0	2	6
(British Columbia) Jim Cotter	0	1	0	2	0	0	2	0	5

Sheet D	1	2	3	4	5	6	7	8	Final
(Alberta) John Morris	0	0	1	0	0	X	X	X	1
(Manitoba) Mike McEwen 🔨	0	3	0	2	2	X	X	X	7

Sheet E	1	2	3	4	5	6	7	8	Final
(Ontario) Glenn Howard	0	2	1	0	0	2	0	0	5
(Ontario) Robert Rumfeldt 🔨	2	0	0	0	1	0	0	1	4

== Tiebreakers ==
Saturday, December 15, 9:00 am

Team	1	2	3	4	5	6	7	8	Final
(Ontario) Jake Higgs	0	1	0	0	2	0	0	X	3
(British Columbia) Jim Cotter 🔨	2	0	0	1	0	3	0	X	6

Player percentages
(Ontario) Jake Higgs		(British Columbia) Jim Cotter	
Bill Buchanan	62%	Rick Sawatsky	70%
Codey Maus	69%	Tyrel Griffith	77%
Jake Higgs	63%	Jason Gunnlaugson	83%
Brent Ross	67%	Jim Cotter	71%
Total	65%	Total	76%

Team	1	2	3	4	5	6	7	8	Final
(Manitoba) Jeff Stoughton 🔨	1	0	2	0	2	2	X	X	7
(Manitoba) Rob Fowler	0	1	0	1	0	0	X	X	2

Player percentages
(Manitoba) Jeff Stoughton		(Manitoba) Rob Fowler	
Mark Nichols	86%	Derek Samagalski	96%
Reid Carruthers	87%	Richard Daneault	76%
Jon Mead	86%	Allan Lyburn	70%
Jeff Stoughton	87%	Rob Fowler	64%
Total	86%	Total	76%

== Playoffs ==
Quarterfinals
(Ontario) Glenn Howard	7
(British Columbia) Jim Cotter	2
(Newfoundland and Labrador) Brad Gushue	4
(Ontario) Mark Kean	7
(Manitoba) Mike McEwen	4
(Manitoba) Jeff Stoughton	1
(Ontario) Brad Jacobs	6
(Alberta) Kevin Koe	5

Semifinals
(Ontario) Glenn Howard	5
(Ontario) Mark Kean	3
(Manitoba) Mike McEwen	5
(Ontario) Brad Jacobs	8

Final
(Ontario) Glenn Howard	3
(Ontario) Brad Jacobs	1

=== Quarterfinals ===
Saturday, December 15, 12:30 pm

Sheet A	1	2	3	4	5	6	7	8	Final
(Ontario) Glenn Howard 🔨	2	0	0	1	0	4	X	X	7
(British Columbia) Jim Cotter	0	1	0	0	1	0	X	X	2

Player percentages
(Ontario) Glenn Howard		(British Columbia) Jim Cotter	
Craig Savill	73%	Rick Sawatsky	66%
Brent Laing	84%	Tyrel Griffith	72%
Wayne Middaugh	65%	Jason Gunnlaugson	74%
Glenn Howard	75%	Jim Cotter	43%
Total	74%	Total	64%

Sheet B	1	2	3	4	5	6	7	8	Final
(Newfoundland and Labrador) Brad Gushue 🔨	1	0	0	0	2	0	1	0	4
(Ontario) Mark Kean	0	0	1	0	0	2	0	4	7

Player percentages
(Newfoundland and Labrador) Brad Gushue		(Ontario) Mark Kean	
Geoff Walker	82%	Tim March	77%
Brett Gallant	60%	Patrick Janssen	84%
Adam Casey	79%	Travis Fanset	80%
Brad Gushue	78%	Mark Kean	89%
Total	75%	Total	83%

Sheet C	1	2	3	4	5	6	7	8	Final
(Manitoba) Mike McEwen 🔨	0	0	1	0	2	0	1	X	4
(Manitoba) Jeff Stoughton	0	0	0	0	0	1	0	X	1

Player percentages
(Manitoba) Mike McEwen		(Manitoba) Jeff Stoughton	
Denni Neufeld	65%	Mark Nichols	78%
Matt Wozniak	73%	Reid Carruthers	70%
B. J. Neufeld	73%	Jon Mead	77%
Mike McEwen	81%	Jeff Stoughton	65%
Total	73%	Total	73%

Sheet D	1	2	3	4	5	6	7	8	Final
(Ontario) Brad Jacobs 🔨	0	1	2	0	0	1	1	1	6
(Alberta) Kevin Koe	1	0	0	2	2	0	0	0	5

Player percentages
(Ontario) Brad Jacobs		(Alberta) Kevin Koe	
Ryan Harnden	93%	D. J. Kidby	84%
E. J. Harnden	77%	Carter Rycroft	80%
Ryan Fry	80%	Pat Simmons	91%
Brad Jacobs	68%	Kevin Koe	77%
Total	80%	Total	83%

=== Semifinals ===
Saturday, December 15, 4:30 pm

Team	1	2	3	4	5	6	7	8	Final
(Ontario) Glenn Howard 🔨	1	0	0	2	0	1	0	1	5
(Ontario) Mark Kean	0	0	0	0	2	0	1	0	3

Player percentages
(Ontario) Glenn Howard		(Ontario) Mark Kean	
Craig Savill	91%	Tim March	98%
Brent Laing	98%	Patrick Janssen	84%
Wayne Middaugh	96%	Travis Fanset	88%
Glenn Howard	95%	Mark Kean	83%
Total	95%	Total	88%

Team	1	2	3	4	5	6	7	8	Final
(Manitoba) Mike McEwen	0	1	0	2	0	2	0	X	5
(Ontario) Brad Jacobs 🔨	2	0	3	0	1	0	2	X	8

Player percentages
(Manitoba) Mike McEwen		(Ontario) Brad Jacobs	
Denni Neufeld	81%	Ryan Harnden	83%
Matt Wozniak	83%	E. J. Harnden	84%
B. J. Neufeld	65%	Ryan Fry	84%
Mike McEwen	73%	Brad Jacobs	82%
Total	76%	Total	83%

=== Final ===
Sunday, December 16, 10:00 am

Team	1	2	3	4	5	6	7	8	Final
(Ontario) Glenn Howard 🔨	0	1	0	0	0	0	1	1	3
(Ontario) Brad Jacobs	0	0	0	0	1	0	0	0	1

Player percentages
(Ontario) Glenn Howard		(Ontario) Brad Jacobs	
Craig Savill	90%	Ryan Harnden	93%
Brent Laing	79%	E. J. Harnden	84%
Wayne Middaugh	89%	Ryan Fry	79%
Glenn Howard	74%	Brad Jacobs	73%
Total	83%	Total	82%
