= Broomgate =

Curling controversy

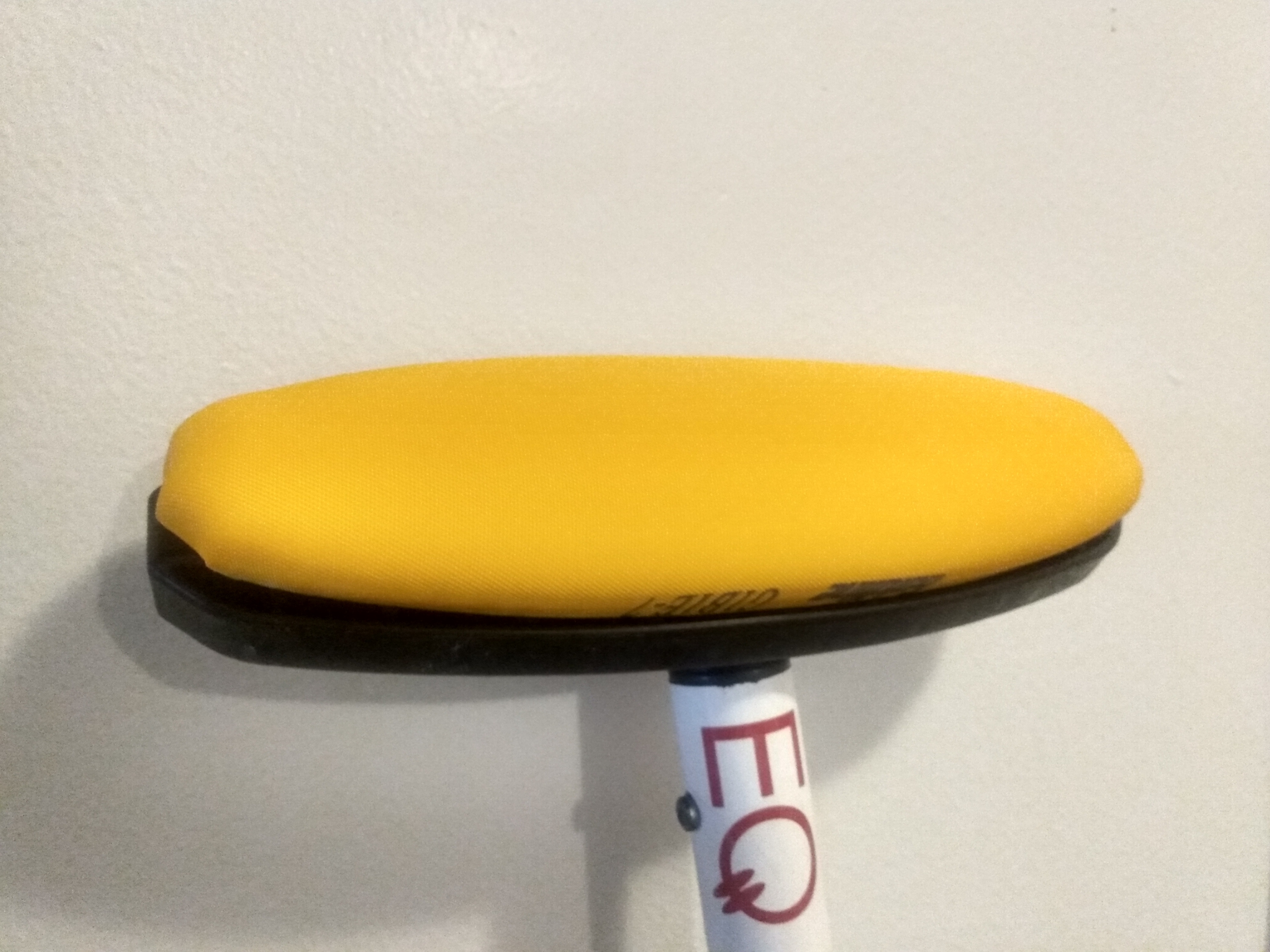
Following the controversy, these mustard-yellow broom-heads are the only legal broom-heads certified by the World Curling Federation for competitive play.

"Broomgate", also known as brushgate, was a technology doping controversy in the sport of curling during the 2015–16 season. It was caused by the result of new brush head technologies and sweeping techniques that dramatically altered how the game was played that season. It resulted in a World Curling Federation summit to regulate and standardize brushes in the sport.

== Background ==
In curling, sweeping the ice in front of the rock traditionally has been used to make the rock travel farther and to maintain a straighter trajectory. In 2015, many of the world's top competitive teams began using new fabrics on their broom heads which were described as being "like sandpaper, but at a microscopic level". The new brush heads were criticized as being able to steer the rocks like a "joystick", and were able to "slow a rock down" and to make it curl more, the opposite of what sweeping has traditionally done. These new abilities were criticized as it took away the skill of the act of throwing the rock. Many top curlers believed that if a player throws a rock badly, they should not be rewarded. There was also the worry that shots were being made "too easy", and that the result of a game could come down to just one missed shot.

== Early use ==
During the 2014–15 season, the Mike McEwen team were the first top team to employ the use of a new brush head called the "icePad", which was manufactured by the fledgling Hardline Curling company. The team saw tremendous success during the season, winning the 2014 Canada Cup, two Grand Slams and five other tour events, finishing the season ranked first on the World Curling Tour Order of Merit and money rankings. Team Reid Carruthers also adopted the Hardline brush heads that season.

In the off season, the Brad Gushue rink realized the effectiveness of the Hardline brush heads, and bought some themselves to try out at an event in South Korea. After struggling to figure them out, they then realized that they could be used to make the rock curl more or to "back them up off the sheet". The team employed these new sweeping techniques with the brush heads, which was dubbed "directional sweeping" at the 2015 GSOC Tour Challenge Grand Slam event, the first major tournament of the 2015–16 season, held in September. There the team turned heads, as they used only one sweeper to brush their rocks, instead of the traditional two. The thought process by the Gushue team was that having two sweepers would "cancel out" the directional sweeping of each other with the new brush heads.

In response to Gushue's display at the Tour Challenge, Team Glenn Howard called up their broom supplier, Balance Plus, and got them to develop their own brush heads to rival the icePads. Teams affiliated with Balance Plus debuted them at the 2015 Stu Sells Toronto Tankard tour event, and showed that the Balance Plus fabric dubbed "the Blackhead" or "Black Magic" was even more powerful than the Hardline fabric.

The 2015 Stu Sells Toronto Tankard was a flash point in the Broomgate saga, as it featured teams using the Hardline icePad versus teams using the Balance Plus Black Magic heads. The effectiveness of the Balance Plus brooms was so strong that it was noticeably damaging the ice. Teams got so upset that they were forced to make a "gentleman's agreement" mid-way through the event to stop using either brush head so that the conditions were fair. However, when the Balance Plus–sponsored Glenn Howard rink made it to the finals against the Hardline-sponsored Mike McEwen rink, Howard gave McEwen an ultimatum: either stop using the Hardline brush heads for good, or they would bring the Black Magic heads back for the final. Team McEwen refused, and so the final featured the two teams and the rival brooms in action. The game, which lasted seven ends, ended up taking three and half hours, over an hour longer than normal, as the McEwen rink had to "clean up" the ice after every Team Howard shot due to the damage the Balance Plus brush heads were doing. Ironically, it was this damage that ended up ruining one of the Howard team's shots, resulting in the team losing the game.

== Backlash ==
Following the controversy at the Stu Sells Toronto Tankard, Balance Plus recalled their brooms, asking teams to send the brush heads back. Later in the month, prior to the Canad Inns Prairie Classic, 22 of the top men's and women's teams on the World Curling Tour signed an agreement to stop using the new fabrics, and the tour itself asked curlers to stop using them.

In November 2015, the World Curling Federation (WCF) instituted a moratorium on new brush heads, with that year's Pacific-Asia Championships being the first event following the temporary ban. The ruling stated that "modified, custom-made or home-made (and) only sweeping equipment available for sale to the public at retail outlets will be permitted." The moratorium was extended for the 2015 European Curling Championships held a week later after research done at Uppsala University confirmed that the Hardline icePad inserts were "scratching the ice", which meant that they were in effect damaging the ice, which was not allowed. However, the research was only done on the Hardline inserts, meaning WCF only banned them, and no other product that season.

The scandal was mocked on a November 2015 episode of The Late Show with Stephen Colbert, which dubbed it "Broomageddon".

== Remaining season ==
Despite teams agreements and brush head moratoriums, the remainder of 2015–16 season was played without exact rules in place. At the 2016 Scotties Tournament of Hearts, 2016 Tim Hortons Brier and the 2016 World Curling Championships, hair brooms were banned from use by front-end players and outside of the house. Prior to the Brier, a "gentleman's agreement" was attempted at the instigation of Alberta lead Ben Hebert with the aim of stopping teams from swapping brooms among themselves, which had been an issue at the Scotties. There, some teams had swapped the skip's broom, as skips do less sweeping, and therefore would be fresher, and therefore more effective. The teams at the Brier could not come to an agreement, and so some teams there took advantage of broom swapping, with Team Alberta (skipped by Kevin Koe) themselves mastering the practice to the point that they ended up winning the event. The 2016 World Men's Curling Championship had even more relaxed rules, allowing teams an extra "throwing broom", effectively giving teams an extra fresh broom to use in play. The Koe rink, now representing Canada took advantage there too, and went on to win the World Championship. The relaxed rules also helped the silver medallist Danish team (skipped by Rasmus Stjerne), a team that had finished in last place at both the 2014 World and European Championships (and did not even qualify for the 2015 World), and were the last European team to qualify for the 2016 Worlds.

Another flashpoint of the Broomgate season came at the 2016 Alberta Scotties Tournament of Hearts. One of the rules instituted that season was that teams could only use brooms that were "commercially available", as in not especially made for teams. By the time of the season's provincial playdowns, hair brooms (which had yet to be banned) were seen as being the most effective brush heads available, and as a result, the most effective hair broom produced by Goldline had sold out. Goldline removed the product from their website, which meant they were no longer "commercially available", causing some teams to claim that that meant they were therefore illegal to use. Some teams had to contact Goldline to put the product back on their site (but indicating it was "sold out") in order to circumvent the ad-hoc rules. The dispute resulted in a "very contentious" Alberta final, which was won by Chelsea Carey.

== Banning ==
In May 2016, a number of the world's top curlers gathered in Kemptville, Ontario, to test various brush heads with the help of the National Research Council in what was dubbed as a "Sweeping Summit". At the summit, the curlers and researchers tested over 50 different brush heads and sweeping techniques using robots and GPS technologies.

Prior to the start of the 2016–17 season The World Curling Federation decided on allowing only one standard fabric in sanctioned events. Curling Canada followed suit, banning all other fabrics from their competitions.

== Podcast ==
Nine years later, comedian and former curler John Cullen hosted a six-part CBC podcast called Broomgate: A Curling Scandal, which covers the events of broomgate in great detail. Cullen called himself "patient zero" in the scandal, as he was among the first curlers to use the new brush head fabric during the 2013–14 season, and recommended its use to Mike McEwen and his team.

== "Broomgate 2.0" ==
A follow-up scandal, known as Broomgate 2.0 or Foamgate emerged in the 2024–25 season, as the previous broomgate controversy didn't account for the hardness of the foam inserts underneath the fabric. This resulted in manufacturers creating harder foams, which allowed teams to apply more pressure on the ice, which was seen as advantageous. In January 2025, elite curlers representing 15 men's and 15 women's teams gathered together ahead of the 2025 Masters Grand Slam to send World Curling a "Proposal for Fair Play in Curling" outlining concerns over the new foam pad technologies being used by some teams. Their worry was that the new foam pads, released by BalancePlus and Goldline appeared "to enhance sweeping performance", contrary to the goals of the 2016 sweeping summit, though still compliant with World Curling specifications. Team John Epping, the only rink that used the new BalancePlus broom-heads was asked not to use them for the Masters, and did not sign the proposal, but did comply. Teams using the Goldline products were also asked not to use them.
