= Morgan Lavell =

Canadian curler (born 1985)

- Curler ♀
- Born: Morgan Court; February 18, 1985 (age 41); Vancouver, British Columbia

Curling career
- Member Association: Ontario
- Hearts: 1 (2014)
- Top CTRS ranking: 3rd (2016–17)
- Grand Slam victories: 1 (2016 Masters)

Morgan Lavell (née Court born February 18, 1985) is a Canadian curler. She currently coaches the Jayden King rink and the University of Guelph women's curling team.

== Curling career ==
Lavell began playing on the Women's World Curling Tour at the 2007 Southwestern Ontario Women's Charity Cashspiel. During her time on the WCT, she has won at the 2013 StuSells Toronto Tankard, the 2015 KW Fall Classic and the 2017 City of Perth Ladies International. In major events, Lavell made her first Grand Slam of Curling appearance at the 2012 The Masters Grand Slam of Curling where her team placed in 11th place. After not competing in any Grand Slam events in 2015, Court won her first Grand Slam title at the 2016 The Masters Grand Slam of Curling and lost the semi-final at the 2016 GSOC Tour Challenge.

Between 2017 and 2018, Lavell and her team had quarterfinal finishes at the Canadian Open in 2017 and 2018 and at the 2018 National. Apart from the Grand Slam tournaments, she has competed at the 2014 Scotties Tournament of Hearts and the 2017 Canadian Olympic Curling Trials.

== Golf career ==
Outside of curling, Lavell started her golf career as an intern at the 2009 Canadian Women's Open. The following year, she joined the Professional Golfers' Association of Canada as the administrator of education in 2010. She was promoted to managing director in 2013 and resigned from her executive position in 2016.

== Personal life ==
During her childhood, Lavell began playing curling when she was nine years old and added golf as a young adult. For her post-secondary education, Lavell went to the University of Guelph for a Bachelor of Arts in human sciences and a sports marketing postgraduate certificate from George Brown College. As of 2020, Lavell is a self-employed online learning consultant. On April 20, 2020, Lavell was diagnosed with Stage 3 breast cancer.

Lavell is married to Ryan Lavell. As of 2020, she and her family reside in Cambridge, Ontario. Lavell gave birth to a son, Max, in June 2020.
