= Wesley Forget =

Canadian curler (born 1991)

- Curler
- Born: June 2, 1991 (age 35); Bowmanville, Ontario

Team
- Skip: Wesley Forget
- Third: John McCutcheon
- Second: Robert Currie
- Lead: Evan Lilly
- Mixed doubles partner: Megan Smith

Curling career
- Member Association: Ontario
- Brier: 1 (2019)

Wesley Forget (/ˈfoʊrʒeɪ/ FOHR-zhay; born June 2, 1991) is a Canadian curler. He currently skips his own team out of Toronto. He is a former Canadian Curling Club Champion, and represented Ontario at the 2019 Tim Hortons Brier, Canada's national curling championship.

== Career ==
=== Early career ===
Forget began curling at age 11, after watching Kevin Martin win a silver medal at the 2002 Winter Olympics. He first started curling at the Oshawa Curling Club. While attending Bowmanville High School, where he won two Lake Ontario Secondary School Athletics bronze medals.

Forget won the 2016 Travelers Curling Club Championship for the Cataraqui Golf and Country Club, along with teammates David Staples, Graham Rathwell and Sandy Staples. The team defeated Saskatchewan in the final, to claim the national championship for club-level curlers.

After coaching the Queen's Golden Gaels curling team for the 2015–16 curling season, Forget joined the team as a player for the next season, skipping the rink. Forget led the team to a silver medal at the 2017 Ontario University Athletics (OUA) Championship, losing to the Laurier Golden Hawks in the final. At the OUA Championship, he was named as an OUA All-Star, and was named Queen's University's male athlete of the week. The silver medal earned the team a spot at the 2017 U Sports curling championships, where they finished fifth with a 3–4 record. After the event, Forget was named as a first team All-Canadian.

=== Mixed ===
Forget won an Ontario Mixed title playing second for Wayne Tuck Jr., and represented the province at the 2019 Canadian Mixed Curling Championship (played in November 2018). There, the team finished in fourth place.

In mixed doubles curling, Forget won the 2024 Montana's North Bay Mixed Doubles event with partner Kira Brunton.

=== Men's ===
In men's curling, Forget joined the Codey Maus rink in 2015, playing second on the team. That season, the rink won the Oakville OCT Fall Classic and the Stroud Sleeman Cash Spiel events on the World Curling Tour. The team didn't make it to provincials that season, but were successful in doing so in 2017. At the 2017 Ontario Tankard, the rink went 5–4, missing the playoffs after losing their second tiebreaker game. The team made it back to the 2018 Ontario Tankard, where they did make the playoffs, losing in the semifinal to Team John Epping.

In 2018, Maus left the rink and Scott McDonald took over as skip. The team found quick success on the tour, winning the 2018 Challenge de Curling de Gatineau event. The team played in two Slams that season, going 1–3 both the 2018 National and the 2019 Canadian Open. The team then went on a surprise run at the 2019 Ontario Tankard, going undefeated at the event en route to their first provincial men's title. They represented Ontario at the 2019 Tim Hortons Brier, where they finished with a 6–5 round robin record. The next season, the team won the 2019 Challenge Casino de Charlevoix event, and played in three slams, the 2019 Masters (0–4 record), the 2019 Tour Challenge (0–4) and the 2019 National (1–3). At the 2020 Ontario Tankard, the team lost in the semifinal to Glenn Howard.

In 2021, Forget joined the Tanner Horgan rink. The team qualified through the B side at the 2021 Canadian Olympic Curling Pre-Trials to earn a spot at the 2021 Canadian Olympic Curling Trials and a chance to represent Canada at the 2022 Winter Olympics. There, the team finished with a 1–7 record. The team played in the 2022 Ontario Tankard, where they lost in the C qualifier final.

After one season with Horgan, Forget played one season with Mark Kean, and then another season with Jordan McNamara. He joined the Kibo Mulima rink for the 2024–25 curling season, and qualified for the 2025 Ontario Tankard.

== Personal life ==
Forget's hometown is Bowmanville, Ontario. Forget graduated with from Queen's University at Kingston in 2014, where he took English Language and Literature. At the time of the 2019 Brier, he was working as a residence life coordinator at Queen's, and was a resident of Kingston, Ontario. He currently works as a client success associate for Phreesia Inc, and lives in Ottawa.
