= Codey Maus =

Canadian curler (born 1985)

Codey Maus (born November 16, 1985, in Owen Sound, Ontario) is a Canadian curler from Tara, Ontario. Maus is a three-time provincial junior champion and one-time provincial mixed champion.

== Career ==
=== Juniors ===
Maus won his first provincial junior title in 2002, playing third for the Jeff Armstrong rink. The team represented Ontario at the 2002 Canadian Junior Curling Championships. The team finished the event with a 5–7 record, in 10th place. Maus won another provincial junior title in 2005, playing third for Mark Bice. The team would go on to win a silver medal at the 2005 Canadian Junior Curling Championships. Maus won his third provincial junior title in 2006. Maus skipped a rink consisting of Jeff Grant, Al Stahl and Bill Francis to the provincial championship, and represented Ontario at the 2006 Canadian Junior Curling Championships. Maus led his team to an 8-4 round robin record, in third place. In their only playoff game, they lost to Alberta's Charley Thomas in the semi-final.

=== Men's ===
After his junior career, Maus joined the Pat Ferris rink, playing third for the team in the Fall of 2006. The team won one World Curling Tour event that year, the Weston Fall Classic. The next season, he joined the Wayne Tuck, Jr./Nick Rizzo rink, playing second. With this team, Maus would play in his first Ontario Tankard provincial championship at the 2008 TSC Stores Tankard. The team went 5–5 through the round robin, before losing in a tie breaker match. Maus left the team in 2009.

Maus joined up with his former junior teammate Mark Bice for the 2009-10 season, playing third on the team. The team made it to the 2010 Ontario Men's Curling Championship, where they would finish with a 3–7 record. The team made it to another provincial championship in 2011, this time improving their record to 6-4, but failing to make the playoffs. That season they also played in one Grand Slam event, the BDO Canadian Open, nearly making the playoffs after losing in the final qualifier.

In 2012, Maus joined the Jake Higgs rink as the team's second. This team would play in two Grand Slam events in their first season together. They would play in the 2012 ROGERS Masters of Curling, losing all three of their games and the 2012 Canadian Open of Curling where they fared better, losing in a tie-breaker after winning three games. The team played in the 2013 The Dominion Tankard, the provincial championship, finishing 2-8. The team didn't enter any slams the next season, but did qualify for another provincial championship. At the 2014 Travelers Tankard, the team finished with a marginally better 3-7 record. Maus left the team in 2014.

Maus joined the Peter Corner rink for the 2014-15 season, remaining at second. The team made it to the 2015 Ontario Tankard, where they would lose in the semi-final.

Maus only played on the team for the one season before forming his own team in 2015 with Scott McDonald, Wesley Forget, Jeff Grant and Brian Chick. The team won their first event together, the 2015 Oakville OCT Fall Classic.

In 2018 this team qualified for the Ontario Tankard in Huntsville. It is the first time Maus qualified for the provincial tournament as a skip.

=== Mixed ===
In 2009, Maus won a provincial mixed title playing second on a team skipped by Mark Bice. The team represented Ontario at the 2010 Canadian Mixed Curling Championship. The team posted a 9-2 round robin record, to finish 2nd place. In the playoffs they would beat British Columbia before losing to Nova Scotia in the final.

== Personal life ==
Maus works as an Enforcement Officer for the Canada Border Services Agency. He attended Chesley District High School and Brock University.
