= Robert Rumfeldt =

Canadian curler

- Curler
- Born: February 18, 1966 (age 60); Windsor, Ontario

Curling career
- Member Association: Ontario
- Brier: 1 (1996)
- Top CTRS ranking: 11th (2011–12)

Robert "Rob" Rumfeldt (born February 18, 1966, in Windsor, Ontario) is a Canadian curler from Guelph. Rumfeldt was a member of the 1996 Ontario provincial championship team, when he played second for Bob Ingram. As of 2015, Rumfeldt has played in ten provincial men's championships.

A longtime second, Rumfeldt began skipping his own team for the 2009-10 season.

In addition to winning the 1996 provincial men's championship, Rumfeldt has also won the 1994 provincial mixed championship (with Ingram) on a team that included his wife Paulinka, and the 1994 Silver Tankard.

== 1996 Brier ==
Rumfeldt won the provincial championship in 1996, playing second for Bob Ingram's Ridgetown Curling Club rink which also consisted of Larry Smyth (third) and James Brackett (lead). It was Rumfeldt's only career men's provincial title. The team finished with a record of 4–7, in 10th place, one of the worst records ever for Ontario. Rumfeldt played a respectable 80%, third among seconds.

== Personal life ==
In 1994, Rumfeldt was employed as an account manager for Toronto Dominion Bank. He is currently a commercial banker with TD. He attended Assumption High School in Windsor and the University of Windsor. He is the brother-in-law of fellow curler Richard Hart.
