= Mark Kean =

Canadian curler (born 1988)

- Curler
- Born: June 22, 1988 (age 38); Innerkip, Ontario

Team
- Curling club: Halifax CC, Halifax, NS
- Skip: Mark Kean
- Third: Luke Saunders
- Second: Nathan Gray
- Lead: Ryan Abraham

Curling career
- Member Association: Ontario (2007–2018; 2019–2026); Northern Ontario (2018–2019); Nova Scotia (2026–present)
- Brier: 1 (2015)
- Top CTRS ranking: 9th (2012–13)

Mark Kean (born June 22, 1988 in Innerkip, Ontario) is a Canadian curler from Woodstock, Ontario. He currently skips his own team out of Halifax.

== Career ==
Kean's junior career involved winning the provincial junior mixed title in 2009. Kean made a quick transition to men's curling winning the provincial Colts trophy in 2010 and in 2011 playing in his first provincial tournament. At the 2011 provincial championship, his rink finished with a 3–7 record.

As preparation for the 2011 provincial, the Kean rink played in their first Grand Slam of Curling event, at the 2011 BDO Canadian Open of Curling, where they went winless (0–5).

Kean qualified for his second provincial championship in 2012 posting a 3-7 record. The rink also played in two Grand Slam events that season, the 2011 World Cup of Curling where they went 0–5 and the 2011 BDO Canadian Open of Curling where they won their first game (defeating John Epping) in a Grand Slam event, going 1–4

The Kean rink played in the 2012 The Masters Grand Slam of Curling where they again were win less, going 0–5. However, in their second Grand Slam of the season, the 2012 Canadian Open of Curling, not only did they win a game, they went all the way to the semi-final where they lost to provincial rival Glenn Howard. The team then went 1–4 at the 2013 National, and were again win less at the 2013 Players' Championship. The next season, the Kean rink played in the 2013 Canadian Olympic Curling Pre-Trials, where they were eliminated after losing all three of their games. The team found success again at the 2013 Canadian Open, where they lost in the quarter-finals. Kean left the team mid-season.

Team Kean, that was newly formed with vice Mathew Camm, second David Mathers and lead Scott Howard only 11 months before the tournament, won the 2015 Ontario Tankard. They finished the round robin in first-place, going 8-2, before ultimately defeating John Epping's Team Epping in the finals 7–6 in 10 ends. This win at provincials qualified Team Kean to represent Ontario at the 2015 Tim Hortons Brier, where they finished 5-6, missing the playoffs. After one season together, the team disbanded in the off-season and forfeited the right to return to the Ontario Tankard to Team Epping.

Kean would again start to find success competitively in 2025, with his new team of Brady Lumley, Matthew Garner, and Spencer Dunlop. In their first season together, they qualified for the 2025 Ontario Tankard. At the Tankard, the team would finish in third place, losing to Scott Howard 7–3 in the semifinals. The team would continue to find success next season, winning the 2025 Stu Sells Toronto Tankard, beating Scotland's Kyle Waddell 7–6 in the final. Their success over the past two seasons qualified them for the 2025 Canadian Olympic Curling Pre-Trials. At the Pre-Trials however, they would have a disappointing week, going winless (0–7).

== Personal life ==
Kean is married to fellow competitive curler Mallory Kean (née Buist). They have two children, Parker and Kaleigh.

He founded the dye-sublimation clothing brand Runback in June 2013 and he currently manages the day-to-day operations.

== Grand Slam record ==
Key
C	Champion
F	Lost in Final
SF	Lost in Semifinal
QF	Lost in Quarterfinals
R16	Lost in the round of 16
Q	Did not advance to playoffs
T2	Played in Tier 2 event
DNP	Did not participate in event
N/A	Not a Grand Slam event that season

Event	2010–11	2011–12	2012–13	2013–14
Masters / World Cup	DNP	Q	Q	DNP
Canadian Open	Q	Q	SF	QF
The National	DNP	DNP	Q	DNP
Players' Championships	DNP	DNP	Q	DNP
