= High Park Club =

Tennis and curling club in Toronto, Canada

Coordinates: 43.64274°N 79.45392°W

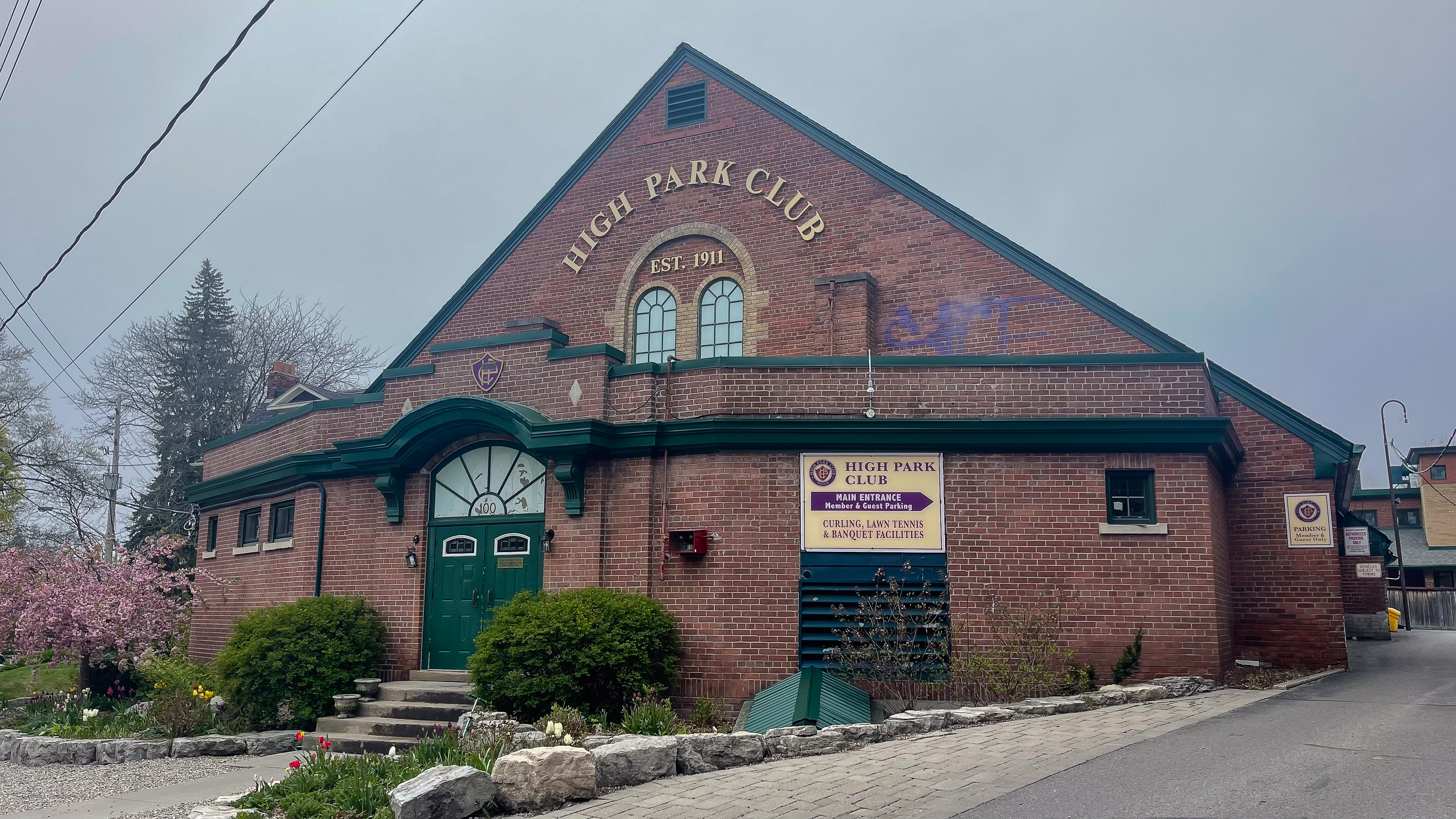
High Park Club Present Day

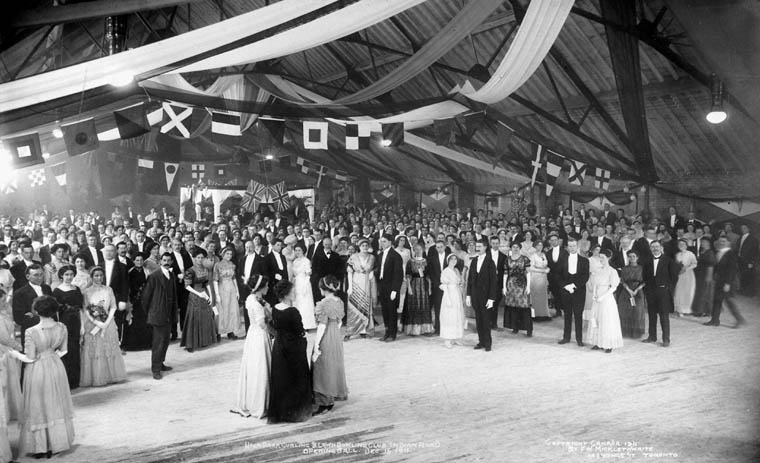
The opening ball of the High Park Curling and Lawn Bowling Club in 1911, by F. W. Micklethwaite

The High Park Club is a tennis and curling club in Toronto, Ontario, Canada. The club is located on Indian Road, just east of High Park. Prior to 1910, curling took place on Grenadier Pond in High Park. The club organized and built its clubhouse in 1911, making it one of Toronto's oldest curling clubs.

== Provincial curling championships ==
- 2026 - Mike McCutcheon, Robert Currie, John McCutcheon, Eric Fenech: Club Men's
- 2009 - Kelly Cochrane, Kelly Scissons, Brenna Cochrane, Lisa Rawlings: Provincial and National Club women's champions
- 2001 - Bobby Reid, Brad Russell, Phil Sager, Mark Stanfield: Junior Men's
- 1998 - Bobby Reid, Megan Balsdon, Mark Stanfield, Kelly Cochrane: Bantam Mixed
- 1975 - Dave Reid, Pat Reid, Terry Lindsey, Martha Lindsey: Mixed

In addition, William Scott, Ed Peaker, Thomas Wright and Fred Lucas represented "Toronto" at the 1927 MacDonald Brier.
