= List of curlers from Ontario =

This is a list of curlers from the Canadian province of Ontario.

== Active curlers ==
=== Men ===
Name	Curling club	Career Highlights
Chad Allen	Brantford	2002 Provincial Colts Champion
Mike Anderson	Thornhill	2008 National University Champion
Scott Bailey	Donalda	1998 World Champion
Greg Balsdon	Loonie/ Richmond Hill	1996 Provincial Junior Mixed Champion
Mark Bice	Tara	2003, 2005 Provincial Junior Champion, 2009 Provincial Mixed Champion
Steve Bice	Tara	2007 World Champion
Don Bowser	Loonie	
Jason Boyce	Loonie	1991 Provincial Junior Champion
Bryan Burgess	Fort William	2001 Northern Ontario Champion
Mathew Camm	Ottawa	2010 World Junior bronze medalist
Andrew Clayton	Harriston	2007 Provincial Junior Mixed Champion
Bryan Cochrane	Rideau	2003 Provincial Champion
Al Corbeil	Collingwood	1985 Provincial Mixed Champion
Peter Corner	Brampton	1993 World Champion
Bruce Delaney	Navy	2009 Canadian Senior Champion
John Epping	Donalda	2006 Canadian Mixed Champion
Caleb Flaxey	Soo CA	2008, 2010 Northern Ontario Champion
Joe Frans	Thornhill	2002, 2005 Provincial Champion
Chris Gardner	Arnprior	2011 Canadian Mixed Champion
Jeff Gorda	Bradford	-
Al Hackner	Fort William	1982 & 1985 World Champion
E. J. Harnden	Soo CA	2008, 2010 Northern Ontario Champion
Ryan Harnden	Soo CA	2008, 2010 Northern Ontario Champion
Mike Harris	Oakville	1998 Olympic Silver Medalist
Cory Heggestad	Stroud	
Jake Higgs	Harriston	2002, 2009 Provincial Mixed Champion
Glenn Howard	Coldwater	1987, 1993, 2007 World Champion
Scott Howard	Coldwater	2012 Brier Champion
Brad Jacobs	Soo CA	2007, 2010 Northern Ontario Champion
Shaun Kaufman	Bradford	1997 Silver Tankard Champion
Mark Kean	Annandale	2009 Provincial Junior Mixed Champion
Brent Laing	Coldwater	1998, 1999 World Junior Champion, 2007 World Champion
Micky Lizmore	Harriston	2007 Provincial Junior Champion
Rob Lobel	Whitby	1982 Provincial Junior Champion
Dale Matchett	Bradford	1994 Provincial Junior Champion
Graeme McCarrel	Brampton	1998 World Champion
Heath McCormick	Sarnia	1996 Provincial Junior Champion, 2004 Provincial Mixed Champion
Wayne Middaugh	St. George's	1993, 1998 World Champion
Rich Moffatt	Rideau	1999 Provincial Champion
Darryl Prebble	Scarboro	
Howard Rajala	Rideau	1999 Provincial Champion
Nick Rizzo	Paris	1979 Provincial Junior Champion / 2003 Provincial Mixed Champion
Brent Ross	Harriston	1997 Colts Champion
Robert Rumfeldt	Guelph	1996 Provincial Champion
Brad Savage	Brampton	1991 Provincial Junior Champion
Craig Savill	Coldwater/ Ottawa	1998, 1999 World Junior Champion, 2007 World Champion
Daryl Shane	Listowel	1978 Provincial Junior Champion
Neil Sinclair	Manotick	2007 Canada Games silver medalist
Ian Tetley	Brampton	1985, 1990, 1998 World Champion
Rick Thurston	Dundas Granite	2008 Provincial Intermediate Champion
Wayne Tuck, Jr.	Woodstock	2002 Provincial Mixed Champion
Ryan Werenich	Bradford	2003 Provincial Colts Champion
Jason Young	Brantford	1999 World Junior Champion
Kirk Ziola	Highland	1983 Saskatchewan Provincial Champion

=== Women ===
Name	Curling club	Career Highlights
Leigh Armstrong	Brant	2006 Canadian Mixed Champion
Cathy Auld	Mississauga	2005 Challenge Champion
Marika Bakewell	Highland	2005 Provincial Junior Mixed Champion
Karen Bell	Listowel	
Kathy Brown	King	
Kim Brown	Ottawa	2006 Provincial Junior Champion, 2011 Provincial Mixed Champion
Chrissy Cadorin	Brant	1999 Provincial Junior Mixed Champion
Mary Chilvers	Oshawa	1995, 1997 Provincial Champion, 1992 Provincial Mixed Champion
Katrina Collins	Bayview	
Julie Columbus	Alliston	
Marlo Dahl	Port Arthur	
Hollie Duncan	K-W Granite	2007 Provincial Junior Champion, 2018 Provincial Champion
Lori Eddy	Alliston	1997 Provincial Champion
Jenna Enge	Idylwylde	2012 Ontario Provincial Champion, 2015, 2018 Northern Ontario Provincial Champion
Lisa Farnell	Peterborough	2006 Provincial Junior Champion
Allison Flaxey	St. Thomas	2009 Canadian Mixed Champion, 2014 Provincial Champion
Tracy Fleury	Idylwylde	2012 Ontario Provincial Champion, 2015, 2018 Northern Ontario Provincial Champion, 2019 Manitoba Provincial Champion
Melissa Foster	Mississauga	
Susan Froud	Alliston	
Amanda Gates	Idylwylde	2012 Ontario Provincial Champion, 2015, 2018 Northern Ontario Provincial Champion
Tara George	Fort William	2006, 2007, 2009, 2010 Provincial Champion
Alison Goring	Bayview	1990 Scott Tournament of Hearts Champion
Andra Harmark	Coldwater	2008 Provincial Champion
Jenn Hanna	Ottawa	2005, 2016 Provincial Champion
Stephanie Hanna	Ottawa	2005 Provincial Champion
Jacqueline Harrison	Alliston	
Julie Hastings	Bayview	2015 Provincial Champion
Rachel Homan	Ottawa	2010 Canadian Junior Champion, 2011, 2013, 2017, 2019 Provincial Champion, 2017 World Champion
Ashley Kallos	Port Arthur	
Alison Kreviazuk	Ottawa	2011 Provincial Champion
Lynn Kreviazuk	Ottawa	2010 Canadian Junior Champion
Kari Lavoie	Fort William	2009, 2010 Provincial Champion
Pascale Letendre	Ottawa	2005 Provincial Champion
Carrie Lindner	Bradford	2001 Provincial Junior Champion
Krista McCarville	Fort William	2006, 2007, 2009, 2010 Ontario Provincial Champion, 2016, 2017, 2019 Northern Ontario Provincial Champion
Christine McCrady	Rideau	1995 Provincial Champion
Susan McKnight	Uxbridge	
Cheryl McPherson	Mississauga	1990 Scott Tournament of Hearts Champion
Lee Merklinger	Brant	2004 Provincial Junior Mixed Champion
Sherry Middaugh	Coldwater	1996 Saskatchewan Provincial Champion, 1999, 2001, 2002, 2004, 2008 Ontario Provincial Champion
Emma Miskew	Ottawa	2010 Canadian Junior Champion, 2011, 2013, 2017, 2019 Provincial Champion, 2017 World Champion
Kim Moore	Coldwater	1997, 2008 Provincial Champion
Erin Morrissey	Peterborough	2005 Provincial Junior Champion, 2011 Provincial Mixed Champion
Brit O'Neill	Glendale	2007 Provincial Junior Mixed Champion
Laura Pickering	North Bay Granite	
Julie Reddick	King	2006 Canadian Mixed Champion
Jo-Ann Rizzo	Brant	2003 Provincial Mixed Champion
Kristy Russell	Shelburne	
Jamie Sinclair	Manotick	2012 Provincial Junior Champion, 2017, 2018, 2019 United States Champion
Ashley Sippala	Fort William	2010 Provincial Champion, 2016, 2017, 2019 Northern Ontario Provincial Champion
Stacey Smith	Bayview	
Karen Trines	Guelph	2005 & 2007 Provincial Junior Champion, 2016, 2018 Provincial Champion
Christy Trombley	Bayview	2007 Tankard Champion
Kirsten Wall	Donalda	2004, 2008 Provincial Champion
Lisa Weagle	Ottawa	2011, 2013, 2017, 2019 Provincial Champion, 2017 World Champion
Jennifer Wylie	Idylwylde	2012 Ontario Provincial Champion, 2015, 2018 Northern Ontario Provincial Champion
