= 2011 Royal LePage OVCA Women's Fall Classic =

- Host city: Kemptville, Ontario
- Arena: North Greenville Curling Club
- Dates: November 3–6
- Winner: (Ontario) Sherry Middaugh
- Curling club: Coldwater & District CC, Coldwater
- Skip: Sherry Middaugh
- Third: Jo-Ann Rizzo
- Second: Lee Merklinger
- Lead: Leigh Armstrong
- Finalist: (Ontario) Jenn Hanna

The 2011 Royal LePage OVCA Women's Fall Classic was held from November 3–6 at the North Greenville Curling Club in Kemptville, Ontario as part of the 2011–12 World Curling Tour. The purse for the event was CAD$15,000, and was held in a triple knockout format.

== Teams ==
Skip	Third	Second	Lead	Locale
Mary-Anne Arsenault	Stephanie McVicar	Kim Kelly	Jennifer Baxter	Halifax, Nova Scotia
Cathy Auld	Janet Murphy	Stephanie Gray	Melissa Foster	Mississauga, Ontario
Mitch Baker	Amy McCooeye	Cindy Charlebois	Ashley Cooper	Cornwall, Ontario
Erin Butler	Erica Cull	Micheala Tuor	Mary Valair	Ottawa, Ontario
Chrissy Cadorin	Brit O'Neill	Jenn Minchin	Jasmine Thurston	Glendale, Ontario
Sian Canavan	Marion Van Horne	Brittany Connell	Audree Debay	Montreal, Quebec
Marie-Christine Cantin	Andreanne Cantin	Virginie Lessard	Anik Brascoup	Levis, Quebec
Alexandra Carlson	Monica Walker	Kendall Moulton	Jordan Moulton	(United States) Minneapolis, Minnesota
Laura Crocker	Sarah Wilkes	Jen Gates	Clancy Grandy	Waterloo, Ontario
Stacie Devereaux	Erin Porter	Alysha Renouf	Heather Martin	(Newfoundland and Labrador) St. John's, Newfoundland
Lisa Farnell	Erin Morrissey	Kim Brown	Ainsley Galbraith	Chaffeys Locks, Ontario
Jaime Gardner	Casey Wall	Laura LaBonte	Ashley Wall	Peterborough, Ontario
Jenn Hanna	Pascale Letendre	Stephanie Hanna	Trish Scharf	Ottawa, Ontario
Julie Hastings	Christy Trombley	Stacey Smith	Katrina Collins	Thornhill, Ontario
Nadine Lehmann	Jenny Perret	Valerie Lutz	Gisele Beuchat	Switzerland
Kimberly Mastine	Nathalie Audet	Audree Dufresne	Saskia Hollands	Montreal, Quebec
Cheryl McBain	Sheryl Doberko	Susan Goheen	Marg Pross	Ottawa, Ontario
Christine McCrady	Allison Farrell	Kathy Kerr	Audrey Frey	Ottawa, Ontario
Sherry Middaugh	Jo-Ann Rizzo	Lee Merklinger	Leigh Armstrong	Coldwater, Ontario
Katie Morrissey	Kiri Campbell	Lorelle Weiss	Cassandra de Groot	Ottawa, Ontario
Laura Payne	Alexis Riordan	Megan Curtin	Kathy Broom	Ottawa, Ontario
Karen Sagle	Andra Harmark	Stephanie Corrado	Morgan Court	Guelph, Ontario
Tracy Samaan	Tanya Rodrigues	Lynsey Longfield	Ailsa Leitch	Ottawa, Ontario
Manuela Siegrist	Alina Paetz	Claudia Hug	Nicole Dunki	Basel, Switzerland

== Knockout results ==
=== A event ===
First Knockout
(Ontario) Julie Hastings	6
(Ontario) Laura Payne	2
(Ontario) Chrissy Cadorin	7
(Quebec) Sian Canavan	2
(Switzerland) Nadine Lehmann	5
(Ontario) Cheryl McBain	6
(Ontario) Lisa Farnell	7
(Ontario) Tracy Samaan	6

Semifinals
(Ontario) Julie Hastings	7
(Ontario) Chrissy Cadorin	2
(Ontario) Cheryl McBain	5
(Ontario) Lisa Farnell	8

Qualifier 1
(Ontario) Julie Hastings	10
(Ontario) Lisa Farnell	2

First Knockout
(Newfoundland and Labrador) Stacie Devereaux	9
(Ontario) Katie Morrissey	1
(Ontario) Jenn Hanna	6
(Ontario) Erin Butler	4
(Ontario) Christine McCrady	7
(Switzerland) Manuela Siegrist	5
(Ontario) Cathy Auld	7
(Ontario) Jamie Gardner	2

Semifinals
(Newfoundland and Labrador) Stacie Devereaux	2
(Ontario) Jenn Hanna	5
(Ontario) Christine McCrady	4
(Ontario) Cathy Auld	7

Qualifier 2
(Ontario) Jenn Hanna	5
(Ontario) Cathy Auld	4

First Knockout
(Nova Scotia) Mary-Anne Arsenault	7
(Ontario) Mitch Baker	3
(Ontario) Laura Crocker	8
(Quebec) Marie-Christine Cantin	4
(United States) Alexandra Carlson	11
(Quebec) Kimberly Mastine	3
(Ontario) Sherry Middaugh	6
(Ontario) Karen Sagle	1

Semifinals
(Nova Scotia) Mary-Anne Arsenault	8
(Ontario) Laura Crocker	3
(United States) Alexandra Carlson	4
(Ontario) Sherry Middaugh	8

Qualifier 3
(Nova Scotia) Mary-Anne Arsenault	8
(Ontario) Sherry Middaugh	3

=== B event ===
Second Knockout
(Ontario) Laura Payne	1
(Quebec) Sian Canavan	7
(Switzerland) Nadine Lehmann	2
(Ontario) Tracy Samaan	7

Quarterfinals
(Ontario) Laura Crocker	10
(Quebec) Sian Canavan	3
(United States) Alexandra Carlson	5
(Ontario) Tracy Samaan	8

Semifinals
(Ontario) Laura Crocker	8
(Ontario) Tracy Samaan	5

Qualifier 4
(Ontario) Laura Crocker	1
(Ontario) Cathy Auld	7

Second Knockout
(Ontario) Katie Morrissey	8
(Ontario) Erin Butler	6
(Switzerland) Manuela Siegrist	11
(Ontario) Jamie Gardner	3

Quarterfinals
(Ontario) Chrissy Cadorin	8
(Ontario) Katie Morrissey	1
(Ontario) Cheryl McBain	3
(Switzerland) Manuela Siegrist	9

Semifinals
(Ontario) Chrissy Cadorin	4
(Switzerland) Manuela Siegrist	5

Qualifier 5
(Switzerland) Manuela Siegrist	3
(Ontario) Sherry Middaugh	8

Second Knockout
(Ontario) Mitch Baker	6
(Quebec) Marie-Christine Cantin	5
(Quebec) Kimberly Mastine	4
(Ontario) Karen Sagle	8

Quarterfinals
(Newfoundland and Labrador) Stacie Devereaux	5
(Ontario) Mitch Baker	7
(Ontario) Christine McCrady	6
(Ontario) Karen Sagle	7

Semifinals
(Ontario) Mitch Baker	1
(Ontario) Karen Sagle	10

Qualifier 6
(Ontario) Karen Sagle	4
(Ontario) Lisa Farnell	6

=== C event ===
Third Knockout
(Ontario) Katie Morrissey	2
(Ontario) Cheryl McBain	9
(Newfoundland and Labrador) Stacie Devereaux	8
(Ontario) Christine McCrady	7

Quarterfinals
(Quebec) Sian Canavan	3
(United States) Alexandra Carlson	4
(Ontario) Cheryl McBain	5
(Ontario) Mitch Baker	6
(Ontario) Tracy Samaan	6
(Newfoundland and Labrador) Stacie Devereaux	7

Semifinals
(United States) Alexandra Carlson	8
(Ontario) Mitch Baker	3
(Newfoundland and Labrador) Stacie Devereaux	2
(Switzerland) Manuela Siegrist	7

Qualifier 7
(United States) Alexandra Carlson	4
(Switzerland) Manuela Siegrist	3

Third Knockout
(Ontario) Laura Payne	7
(Switzerland) Nadine Lehmann	4
(Ontario) Erin Butler	2
(Ontario) Jamie Gardner	7
(Quebec) Marie-Christine Cantin	5
(Quebec) Kimberly Mastine	2

Quarterfinals
(Ontario) Laura Payne	3
(Ontario) Chrissy Cadorin	5
(Ontario) Jamie Gardner	1
(Quebec) Marie-Christine Cantin	7

Semifinals
(Ontario) Karen Sagle	5
(Ontario) Chrissy Cadorin	4
(Ontario) Laura Crocker	7
(Quebec) Marie-Christine Cantin	0

Qualifier 8
(Ontario) Karen Sagle	2
(Ontario) Laura Crocker	5

== Playoffs ==
Quarterfinal
(Ontario) Julie Hastings	4
(Ontario) Laura Crocker	7
(Ontario) Cathy Auld	4
(Ontario) Sherry Middaugh	5
(Ontario) Jenn Hanna	7
(United States) Alexandra Carlson	1
(Nova Scotia) Mary-Anne Arsenault	6
(Ontario) Lisa Farnell	3

Semifinal
(Ontario) Laura Crocker	6
(Ontario) Sherry Middaugh	7
(Ontario) Jenn Hanna	9
(Nova Scotia) Mary-Anne Arsenault	4

Final
(Ontario) Sherry Middaugh	7
(Ontario) Jenn Hanna	2
