= North Grenville Women's Fall Curling Classic =

Rose Dolan Fall Classic
- Established: 2006
- Host city: Kemptville, Ontario
- Arena: North Grenville Curling Club
- Purse: $27,500
- 2026 champion: (Ontario) Sherry Middaugh

Location in Canada

The North Grenville Women's Fall Curling Classic is an annual women's bonspiel held in Kemptville, Ontario. It is typically held in early November and is put on by the North Grenville Curling Club. It was a World Curling Tour event from 2010 to 2019.

The event began in 2006 as the Scotiabank OVCA Women's Fall Classic. From 2007 to 2019 the event was known as the Royal LePage OVCA Women's Fall Classic and the Royal LePage Women's Fall Classic. The bonspiel was cancelled in 2019 and 2020 due to COVID-19 restrictions. In 2022 and 2023 the event operated without a title sponsor. The event was put on hiatus in 2024 due to insufficient sponsorship. The event returned in 2025 under the sponsorship of Your Independent Grocer.

The 2026 event is scheduled for October 29 to November 1, 2026, as the Rose Dolan Fall Classic. The 2026 event will feature an increased prize purse of $27,500.

== Past champions ==
Year	Winning team	Runner-up team	Purse (CAD)
2006	(Ontario) Janet McGhee, Pascale Letendre, Lee Merklinger, Breanne Merklinger	(Quebec) Karo Gagnon, Brenda Nicholls (skip), Kimberly Mastine, Julie Rainville	$10,000
2007	(Ontario) Jenn Hanna, Chrissy Cadorin, Stephanie Hanna, Lee Merklinger	(Ontario) Tracy Samaan, Patricia Hill, Kathy Kerr, Monique Robert	$12,000
2008	(Ontario) Rachel Homan, Emma Miskew, Alison Kreviazuk, Lynn Kreviazuk	(Ontario) Sherry Middaugh, Kirsten Wall, Kim Moore, Andra Harmark	$12,000
2009	(United States) Debbie McCormick, Allison Pottinger, Nicole Joraanstad, Natalie Nicholson	(Ontario) Lisa Farnell, Erin Morrissey, Kim Brown, Ainsley Galbraith	$12,000
2010	(Ontario) Christine McCrady, Kellie Buchanan, Lisa Paddle, Adrey Frey	(Ontario) Tracy Horgan, Jenn Seabrook, Jenna Enge, Amanda Gates	$15,000
2011	(Ontario) Sherry Middaugh, Jo-Ann Rizzo, Lee Merklinger, Leigh Armstrong	(Ontario) Jenn Hanna, Pascale Letendre, Stephanie Hanna, Trish Scharf	$15,000
2012	(Ontario) Rachel Homan, Emma Miskew, Alison Kreviazuk, Lisa Weagle	(Ontario) Allison Nimik, Katie Pringle, Lynn Kreviazuk, Morgan Court	$15,000
2013	(Prince Edward Island) Suzanne Birt, Shelley Bradley, Michelle McQuaid, Susan McInnis	(Manitoba) Darcy Robertson, Tracey Lavery, Vanessa Foster, Michelle Kruk	$16,000
2014	(Ontario) Cathy Auld, Julie Reddick, Holly Donaldson, Carly Howard	(Ontario) Julie Hastings, Christy Trombley, Stacey Smith, Katrina Collins	$16,000
2015	(Ontario) Jacqueline Harrison, Janet Murphy, Stephanie Matheson, Melissa Foster	(Switzerland) Silvana Tirinzoni, Manuela Siegrist, Esther Neuenschwander, Marlene Albrecht	$17,500
2016	(Prince Edward Island) Robyn MacPhee, Sarah Fullerton, Meaghan Hughes, Michelle McQuaid	(Japan) Ayumi Ogasawara, Yumie Funayama, Kaho Onodera, Anna Ohmiya	$17,500
2017	(Nova Scotia) Kristen MacDiarmid, Marie Christianson, Liz Woodworth, Julia Williams	(Sweden) Isabella Wranå, Jennie Wåhlin, Almida de Val, Fanny Sjöberg	$20,000
2018	(Northwest Territories) Kerry Galusha, Sarah Koltun, Brittany Tran, Shona Barbour	(Nova Scotia) Mary-Anne Arsenault, Christina Black, Jenn Baxter, Kristin Clarke	$21,000
2019	(Sweden) Isabella Wranå, Jennie Wåhlin, Almida de Val, Fanny Sjöberg	(Ontario) Krista McCarville, Kendra Lilly, Ashley Sippala, Sarah Potts	$21,000
2020	Cancelled		
2021	Cancelled		
2022	(Ontario) Isabelle Ladouceur, Jamie Smith, Grace Lloyd, Rachel Steele	(Ontario) Danielle Inglis, Kira Brunton, Cheryl Kreviazuk, Cassandra de Groot	$25,000
2023	(Italy) Stefania Constantini, Elena Mathis, Marta Lo Deserto, Giulia Zardini Lacedelli, Angela Romei	(Ontario) Hailey Armstrong, Jessica Humphries, Michaela Robert (3 player team)	$25,000
2024	Cancelled		
2025	(Japan) Ikue Kitazawa, Seina Nakajima, Minori Suzuki, Hasumi Ishigooka	(Ontario) Hollie Duncan, Megan Balsdon, Rachelle Strybosch, Tess Guyatt	$25,000
2026	(Ontario) Sherry Middaugh, Kelly Middaugh, Emily Middaugh, Megan Smith	(Ontario) Brooklyn Ideson, Lauren Evason, Aila Thompson, Clara Dissanayake	$27,500
