= 2017 Ontario Scotties Tournament of Hearts =

- Host city: Cobourg, Ontario
- Arena: Cobourg Community Centre
- Dates: January 29–February 5
- Winner: Rachel Homan
- Curling club: Ottawa Curling Club, Ottawa
- Skip: Rachel Homan
- Third: Emma Miskew
- Second: Joanne Courtney
- Lead: Lisa Weagle
- Coach: Adam Kingsbury
- Finalist: Jacqueline Harrison

The 2017 Ontario Scotties Tournament of Hearts, the provincial women's curling championship for Southern Ontario, was held January 30 to February 5 at the Cobourg Community Centre in Cobourg, Ontario. The winning Rachel Homan rink represented Ontario at the 2017 Scotties Tournament of Hearts on home ice in St. Catharines, Ontario. Homan went on to win her third Scotties Tournament of Hearts, defeating Manitoba's Michelle Englot in the final.

The event was held in conjunction with the 2017 Ontario Tankard, southern Ontario's men's provincial championship which was held at the same time. The events are usually held separately. The opening ceremonies were scheduled for January 30.

The Rachel Homan rink, who were ranked #1 on the World Curling Tour's Order of Merit ranking won the event, after having been upset in the 2016 Ontario Scotties Tournament of Hearts by club-mates Jenn Hanna and her rink. Hanna did not curl competitively in the 2016–17 season.

== Qualification Process ==
Qualifying for the provincial Scotties changed again for 2017. Eight teams will qualify from two regional qualifiers (two each) and a challenge round. The top two southern Ontario teams in the CTRS standings (as of December 4) also qualified.

Qualification method	Berths	Qualifying team
CTRS leaders	2	Rachel Homan; Allison Flaxey
East Qualifier	2	Cathy Auld; Heather Heggestad
West Qualifier	2	Jacqueline Harrison; Julie Tippin
Challenge Round	2	Megan Balsdon; Sherry Middaugh

== Teams ==
The event was headlined by the two-time national champion Rachel Homan rink who entered the event in first place on the World Curling Tour. Other top teams in the event included the 2016 WFG Masters and 2014 provincial champion Allison Flaxey rink, and five-time provincial champion Sherry Middaugh.

The team lineups were as follows:

Skip	Third	Second	Lead	Alternate	Club(s)
Cathy Auld	Lori Eddy	Karen Rowsell	Jenna Bonner	Mary Chilvers	Dundas Valley G&CC, Dundas
Megan Balsdon	Jessica Corrado	Stephanie Corrado	Laura Hickey		Dixie CC, Mississauga
Allison Flaxey	Clancy Grandy	Lynn Kreviazuk	Morgan Court		Guelph CC, Guelph
Jacqueline Harrison	Janet Murphy	Stephanie Matheson	Melissa Foster	Jestyn Murphy	Mississaugua G&CC, Mississauga
Heather Heggestad	Ginger Coyle	Michelle Smith	Lauren Harrison	Colleen Madonia	The Thornhill Club, Thornhill
Rachel Homan	Emma Miskew	Joanne Courtney	Lisa Weagle		Ottawa CC, Ottawa
Sherry Middaugh	Jo-Ann Rizzo	Lee Merklinger	Leigh Armstrong	Kimberly Tuck	Coldwater & District CC, Coldwater
Julie Tippin	Chantal Duhaime	Rachelle Vink	Tess Bobbie		Woodstock CC, Woodstock

== Round-robin standings ==
Key
Teams to Playoffs
Teams to Tiebreaker

Skip (Club)	W	L	PF	PA	Ends Won	Ends Lost	Blank Ends	Stolen Ends
Jacqueline Harrison (Mississaugua)	6	1	48	33	31	27	7	9
Rachel Homan (Ottawa)	5	2	60	38	34	31	5	6
Cathy Auld (Dundas Valley)	4	3	56	63	38	38	9	11
Allison Flaxey (Guelph)	4	3	45	52	29	37	7	3
Sherry Middaugh (Coldwater)	3	4	45	40	33	23	8	13
Julie Tippin (Woodstock)	3	4	42	47	28	32	5	7
Heather Heggestad (Thornhill)	2	5	40	47	32	29	6	12
Megan Balsdon (Dixie)	1	6	34	50	24	32	9	5

== Round-robin results ==
=== Draw 4 ===
Monday, January 30, 8:00 pm

Sheet A	1	2	3	4	5	6	7	8	9	10	Final
Rachel Homan 🔨	0	3	0	2	0	1	0	5	X	X	11
Cathy Auld	0	0	2	0	1	0	1	0	X	X	4

Sheet B	1	2	3	4	5	6	7	8	9	10	Final
Megan Balsdon	0	0	1	0	1	0	1	2	0	X	5
Allison Flaxey 🔨	0	1	0	1	0	4	0	0	0	X	6

Sheet C	1	2	3	4	5	6	7	8	9	10	Final
Julie Tippin 🔨	2	0	0	1	0	2	0	2	0	1	8
Jacqueline Harrison	0	0	2	0	1	0	2	0	1	0	6

Sheet D	1	2	3	4	5	6	7	8	9	10	Final
Heather Heggestad 🔨	0	0	0	2	0	1	1	0	2	0	6
Sherry Middaugh	0	0	1	0	2	0	0	2	0	2	7

=== Draw 5 ===
Tuesday, January 31, 9:30 am

Sheet A	1	2	3	4	5	6	7	8	9	10	Final
Allison Flaxey 🔨	0	1	0	1	3	1	0	1	0	X	7
Heather Heggestad	0	0	1	0	0	0	1	0	2	X	4

Sheet B	1	2	3	4	5	6	7	8	9	10	Final
Jacqueline Harrison	0	1	1	0	1	0	0	2	0	1	6
Rachel Homan 🔨	0	0	0	2	0	1	1	0	1	0	5

Sheet C	1	2	3	4	5	6	7	8	9	10	Final
Sherry Middaugh	0	1	0	1	1	0	1	0	2	0	6
Cathy Auld 🔨	0	0	1	0	0	3	0	2	0	2	8

Sheet D	1	2	3	4	5	6	7	8	9	10	11	Final
Megan Balsdon	0	1	0	0	1	0	1	0	0	2	2	7
Julie Tippin 🔨	0	0	0	2	0	1	0	1	1	0	0	5

=== Draw 7 ===
Tuesday, January 31, 7:30 pm

Sheet A	1	2	3	4	5	6	7	8	9	10	Final
Megan Balsdon	0	0	0	2	0	1	0	X	X	X	3
Jacqueline Harrison 🔨	3	3	1	0	1	0	2	X	X	X	10

Sheet B	1	2	3	4	5	6	7	8	9	10	Final
Heather Heggestad 🔨	0	0	0	0	2	0	2	1	1	0	6
Cathy Auld	2	1	1	1	0	1	0	0	0	1	7

=== Draw 8 ===
Wednesday, February 1, 9:30 am

Sheet C	1	2	3	4	5	6	7	8	9	10	Final
Rachel Homan 🔨	4	0	2	0	1	0	0	1	1	X	9
Julie Tippin	0	1	0	1	0	1	1	0	0	X	4

Sheet D	1	2	3	4	5	6	7	8	9	10	Final
Sherry Middaugh	0	0	2	0	2	1	0	1	1	0	7
Allison Flaxey 🔨	0	3	0	1	0	0	3	0	0	1	8

=== Draw 9 ===
Wednesday, February 1, 2:30 pm

Sheet C	1	2	3	4	5	6	7	8	9	10	Final
Heather Heggestad 🔨	1	1	0	0	2	1	0	0	0	3	8
Megan Balsdon	0	0	2	0	0	0	1	0	2	0	5

Sheet D	1	2	3	4	5	6	7	8	9	10	Final
Cathy Auld 🔨	0	0	0	1	0	2	0	0	0	X	3
Jacqueline Harrison	0	0	2	0	1	0	0	1	2	X	6

=== Draw 10 ===
Wednesday, February 1, 7:30 pm

Sheet A	1	2	3	4	5	6	7	8	9	10	Final
Julie Tippin	1	0	3	1	0	1	0	2	X	X	8
Allison Flaxey 🔨	0	1	0	0	1	0	1	0	X	X	3

Sheet B	1	2	3	4	5	6	7	8	9	10	Final
Rachel Homan	0	1	0	1	0	2	0	2	0	0	6
Sherry Middaugh 🔨	1	0	1	0	0	0	1	0	1	1	5

=== Draw 11 ===
Thursday, February 2, 9:30 am

Sheet C	1	2	3	4	5	6	7	8	9	10	Final
Cathy Auld	0	1	0	1	0	0	2	1	0	2	7
Allison Flaxey 🔨	1	0	0	0	2	2	0	0	1	0	6

Sheet D	1	2	3	4	5	6	7	8	9	10	Final
Rachel Homan	0	2	0	1	1	0	1	0	2	X	7
Megan Balsdon 🔨	2	0	1	0	0	1	0	1	0	X	5

=== Draw 12 ===
Thursday, February 2, 2:30 pm

Sheet A	1	2	3	4	5	6	7	8	9	10	Final
Jacqueline Harrison 🔨	0	0	0	2	0	2	0	2	0	1	7
Sherry Middaugh	1	0	1	0	1	0	1	0	1	0	5

Sheet B	1	2	3	4	5	6	7	8	9	10	11	Final
Julie Tippin 🔨	1	1	0	0	0	2	0	2	0	0	0	6
Heather Heggestad	0	0	1	1	1	0	1	0	1	1	1	7

=== Draw 13 ===
Thursday, February 2, 7:30pm

Sheet A	1	2	3	4	5	6	7	8	9	10	Final
Heather Heggestad 🔨	1	0	1	0	1	0	1	X	X	X	4
Rachel Homan	0	5	0	3	0	1	0	X	X	X	9

Sheet B	1	2	3	4	5	6	7	8	9	10	Final
Allison Flaxey 🔨	0	1	0	0	1	0	1	0	1	X	4
Jacqueline Harrison	1	0	1	1	0	2	0	2	0	X	7

=== Draw 14 ===
Sheet C	1	2	3	4	5	6	7	8	9	10	Final
Megan Balsdon 🔨	0	0	2	0	1	0	2	0	0	X	5
Sherry Middaugh	0	1	0	2	0	2	0	1	2	X	8

Sheet D	1	2	3	4	5	6	7	8	9	10	11	Final
Julie Tippin 🔨	2	0	0	0	1	0	1	2	2	0	3	11
Cathy Auld	0	0	3	2	0	1	0	0	0	2	0	8

=== Draw 15 ===
Friday, February 13, 2:30pm

Sheet A	1	2	3	4	5	6	7	8	9	10	Final
Cathy Auld 🔨	0	1	1	0	0	1	0	0	1	2	6
Megan Balsdon	2	0	0	0	1	0	1	0	0	0	4

Sheet B	1	2	3	4	5	6	7	8	9	10	Final
Sherry Middaugh 🔨	2	1	0	2	2	X	X	X	X	X	7
Julie Tippin	0	0	0	0	0	X	X	X	X	X	0

Sheet C	1	2	3	4	5	6	7	8	9	10	Final
Allison Flaxey 🔨	0	0	1	0	0	3	0	3	0	X	7
Rachel Homan	0	1	0	0	1	0	1	0	1	X	4

Sheet D	1	2	3	4	5	6	7	8	9	10	Final
Jacqueline Harrison 🔨	2	1	0	0	0	0	0	2	0	1	6
Heather Heggestad	0	0	1	1	0	1	1	0	1	0	5

=== Tie Breaker ===
Friday, February 3, 7:30pm

Sheet E	1	2	3	4	5	6	7	8	9	10	Final
Cathy Auld 🔨	2	0	3	0	1	2	0	1	1	X	10
Allison Flaxey	0	2	0	1	0	0	1	0	0	X	4

== Playoffs ==
Semifinal			Final
			1	Jacqueline Harrison	4
2	Rachel Homan	9	2	Rachel Homan	7
3	Cathy Auld	3

=== Semi-final ===
Saturday, February 4, 9:00am

Sheet B	1	2	3	4	5	6	7	8	9	10	Final
Rachel Homan 🔨	1	1	0	4	0	1	0	2	X	X	9
Cathy Auld	0	0	1	0	1	0	1	0	X	X	3

=== Final ===
Sunday, February 5

Team	1	2	3	4	5	6	7	8	9	10	Final
Jacqueline Harrison 🔨	1	0	0	1	0	2	0	0	0	X	4
Rachel Homan	0	0	1	0	3	0	0	2	1	X	7

2017 Ontario Scotties Tournament of Hearts

Rachel Homan
5th Ontario Provincial Championship title

== Qualification ==
East and west regional qualifiers ran from December 16-December 19, 2016. Two teams from each region qualified.

=== East Qualifier ===
December 16–19, at the Oshawa Curling Club, Oshawa

Teams entered:

- Kristina Adams (Ennismore)
- Cathy Auld (Dundas Valley)
- Megan Balsdon (Dixie)
- Chrissy Cadorin (Thornhill)
- Susan Froud (Stroud)
- Julie Hastings (Bayview)
- Heather Heggestad (Thornhill)
- Danielle Inglis (Ottawa Hunt)
- Cassandra Lewin (RCMP)
- Erin Macaulay (Rideau)
- Colleen Madonia (Thornhill)
- Angie Melaney (Lindsay)
- Sherry Middaugh (Coldwater)
- Erin Morrissey (RCMP)
- Samantha Peters (Rideau)
- Charlene Sobering (Rideau)
- Ashley Waye (Royal Canadian)

Brackets:

A Side
Colleen Madonia	3
Angie Melaney	10

Round of 16
Chrissy Cadorin	8
Ashley Waye	1
Megan Balsdon	12
Cassandra Lewin	2
Sherry Middaugh	7
Angie Melaney	2
Erin Macaulay	8
Erin Morrissey	7
Julie Hastings	9
Kristina Adams	6
Samantha Peters	10
Danielle Inglis	9
Susan Froud	1
Cathy Auld	12
Heather Heggestad	8
Charlene Sobering	7

Quarterfinals
Megan Balsdon	3
Chrissy Cadorin	6
Sherry Middaugh	1
Erin Macaulay	8
Julie Hastings	6
Samantha Peters	5
Cathy Auld	10
Heather Heggestad	6

Semifinals
Erin Macaulay	2
Chrissy Cadorin	6
Julie Hastings	5
Cathy Auld	7

A Final
Chrissy Cadorin	2
Cathy Auld	8

B Side (top half)
Ashley Waye	2
Cassandra Lewin	9

Quarterfinals
Colleen Madonia	8
Cassandra Lewin	2
Erin Morrissey	6
Angie Melaney	11

Semifinals
Colleen Madonia	6
Heather Heggestad	8
Samantha Peters	2
Angie Melaney	9

To B Quarterfinal
Heather Heggestad	5
Angie Melaney	4

B Side (Bottom half)
Danielle Inglis	2 1
Kristina Adams	5
Charlene Sobering	2
Susan Froud	10

Semifinals
Sherry Middaugh	8
Kristina Adams	3
Susan Froud	7
Megan Balsdon	3

Finals
Sherry Middaugh	5
Susan Froud	9

B Quarterfinal		B Semifinal		B Final
				Chrissy Cadorin	4
Erin Macaulay	6			Heather Heggestad	5
Heather Heggestad	7	Heather Heggestad	12
Julie Hastings	4	Susan Froud	3
Susan Froud	7

=== West Qualifier ===
December 17–19, at the Guelph Curling Club, Guelph

Teams entered:

- Kelly Cochrane (High Park)
- Michelle Fletcher (Burlington)
- Brenda Halloway (Kitchener-Waterloo Granite)
- Jacqueline Harrison (Mississaugua)
- Mallory Kean (Westmount)
- Jackie Kellie (Glendale)
- Stephanie LeDrew (Sarnia)
- Katie Moreau (Penetanguishene)
- Hollie Nicol (Royal Canadian)
- Jen Spencer (Guelph)
- Julie Tippin (Woodstock)

Brackets:

A side
Jen Spencer	8
Jackie Kellie	10
Stephanie LeDrew	2
Katie Moreau	8
Katie Cottrill	3
Susan Froud	7
Brenda Halloway	6
Michelle Fletcher	7

Quarterfinal
Kelly Cochrane	9
Hollie Nicol	3
Jackie Kellie	4
Jacqueline Harrison	8
Julie Tippin	8
Katie Moreau	4
Michelle Fletcher	8
Mallory Kean	11

Semifinal
Jacqueline Harrison	8
Kelly Cochrane	6
Julie Tippin	6
Mallory Kean	5

Final
Jacqueline Harrison	7
Julie Tippin	2

B Side
Stephanie LeDrew	2
Hollie Nicol	9
Brenda Halloway	9
Jackie Kellie	2
Michelle Fletcher	4
Jen Spencer	8

Quarterfinals
Hollie Nicol	8
Brenda Halloway	3
Jen Spencer	10
Katie Moreau	1

Semifinals
Mallory Kean	7
Hollie Nicol	1
Jen Spencer	9
Kelly Cochrane	6

Finals
Jen Spencer	6
Mallory Kean	7
B Final
Julie Tippin	9
Mallory Kean	1

=== Challenge Round ===
January 20–22, Mississaugua Golf & Country Club, Mississauga

Notes:

- Courtney de Winter skipping the Ashley Waye rink.
- Lauren Wasylkiw skipping the Brenda Holloway rink.

Brackets:

A side
Erin Morrissey	4
Danielle Inglis	10
Kristina Adams	3
Hollie Nicol	6
Courtney de Winter	1
Megan Balsdon	9
Lauren Wasylkiw	6
Mallory Kean	5
Angie Melaney	2
Chrissy Cadorin	10
Katie Moreau	2
Julie Hastings	8
Susan Froud	10
Erin Macaulay	3

Quarterfinal
Sherry Middaugh	7
Danielle Inglis	2
Hollie Nicol	5
Megan Balsdon	6
Lauren Wasylkiw	1
Chrissy Cadorin	7
Julie Hastings	9
Susan Froud	6

Semifinal
Sherry Middaugh	5
Megan Balsdon	6
Chrissy Cadorin	4
Julie Hastings	7

A Final
Megan Balsdon	6
Julie Hastings	5

B Side (Top half)
Mallory Kean	6
Angie Melaney	7
Katie Moreau	5
Erin Macaulay	7

Semifinals
Danielle Inglis	10
Angie Melaney	11
Hollie Nicol	6
Erin Macaulay	8

Finals
Angie Melaney	6
Erin Macaulay	8

B Side (bottom half)		Semifinal		Finals
		Lauren Wasylkiw	9
		Erin Morrissey	7
				Lauren Wasylkiw	8
Kristina Adams	9			Kristina Adams	7
Courtney de Winter	1	Susan Froud	2
		Kristina Adams	8

B Side		Semifinal		B Final
				Sherry Middaugh	7
Erin Macaulay	6			Julie Hastings	6
Chrissy Cadorin	7	Chrissy Cadorin	6
Lauren Wasylkiw	3	Sherry Middaugh	8
Sherry Middaugh	5
