= 2005 Ontario Scott Tournament of Hearts =

- Host city: Ottawa
- Arena: Rideau Curling Club
- Dates: January 24–30
- Winner: Jenn Hanna
- Curling club: Ottawa Curling Club, Ottawa
- Skip: Jenn Hanna
- Third: Pascale Letendre
- Second: Dawn Askin
- Lead: Stephanie Hanna
- Alternate: Joëlle Sabourin
- Coach: Bob Hanna
- Finalist: Krista Scharf

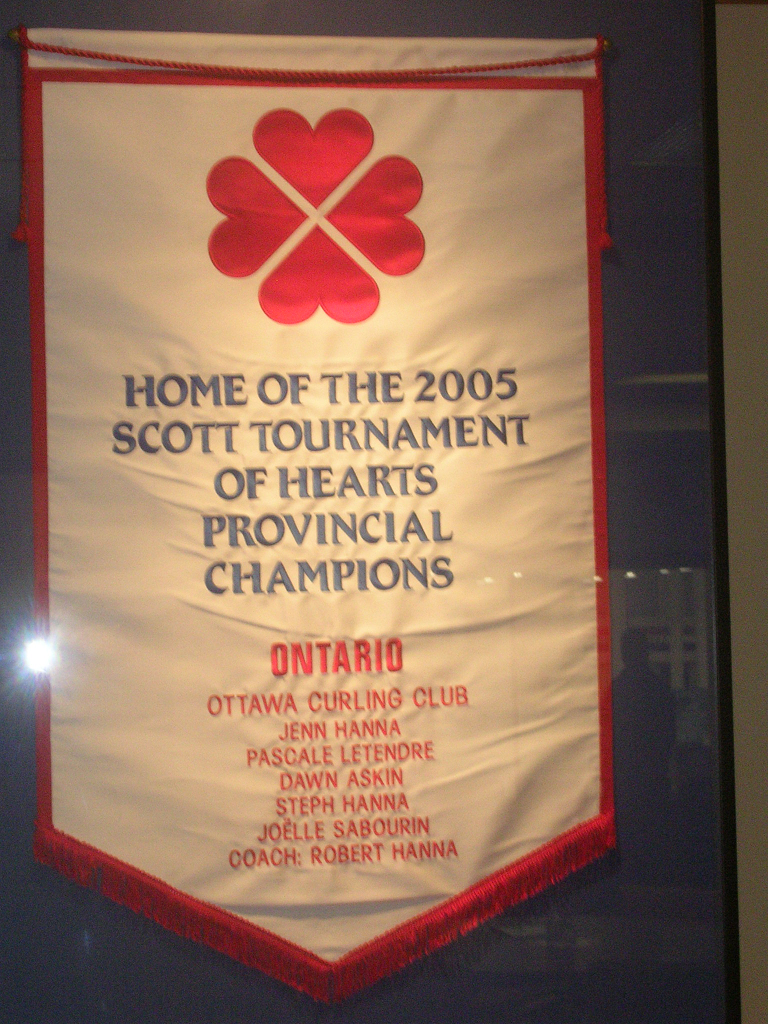
The championship banner won by the Hanna rink hangs on the wall of the Ottawa Curling Club.

The 2005 Ontario Scott Tournament of Hearts, Ontario's provincial women's curling championship, was held January 24–30 at the Rideau Curling Club in Ottawa. The winning team of Jenn Hanna would go on to represent Ontario at the 2005 Scott Tournament of Hearts in St. John's, Newfoundland and Labrador.

Hanna's win would be the first of two provincial championships in her career, not winning her second championship until 2016. It would also be the lone provincial championship for her third Pascale Letendre and the first of two for her sister, lead Stephanie Hanna. Her second Dawn Askin would later move to Manitoba to play lead for Jennifer Jones and win several provincial, national, two world championships and an Olympic gold there.

Hanna's rink from the nearby Ottawa Curling Club had a slow start at the event, and had a 1-4 record at one point. However, they pulled off eight straight wins to win the championship. At the national Scott Tournament of Hearts, the rink had a similar slow start before rallying to make the playoffs before losing in the final to Manitoba's Jones.

The defending champion Sherry Middaugh rink failed to qualify.

== Teams ==
Skip	Third	Second	Lead	Curling Club
Kathy Brown	Janet Langevin	Christine Loube	Heather Carr	Sutton Curling Club, Sutton West
Chrissy Cadorin	Denna Schell	Leigh Armstrong	Stephanie Leachman	Guelph Curling Club, Guelph
Tara George	Liz Kingston	Tiffany Stubbings	Lorraine Lang	Fort William Curling Club, Thunder Bay
Jenn Hanna	Pascale Letendre	Dawn Askin	Stephanie Hanna	Ottawa Curling Club, Ottawa
Janet McGhee	Julie Reddick	Lori Eddy	Mary Chilvers	Uxbridge and District Curling Club, Uxbridge
Kim Moore	Lindsay Loevenmark	Melissa Foster	Deb McPhadden	North Halton Golf and Country Club, Georgetown
Jo-Ann Rizzo	Cheryl McPherson	Kimberly Tuck	Sarah Gatchell	Brant Curling Club, Brantford
Krista Scharf	Angie Del Pino	Leesa Broder	Laura Armitage	Fort William Curling Club, Thunder Bay
Dawn Schwar	Margaret McLaughlin	Shannon Roy	Janice Vettoretti	Sudbury Curling Club, Sudbury
Elaine Uhryn	Kelly McLellan	Sherri Maguire	Karen Bonenfant	Soo Curlers Association, Sault Ste. Marie

== Standings ==
Skip	W	L
Chrissy Cadorin (Guelph)	7	2
Krista Scharf (Fort William)	6	3
Jo-Ann Rizzo (Brant)	6	3
Jenn Hanna (Ottawa)	5	4
Janet McGhee (Uxbridge)	5	4
Kathy Brown (Sutton)	5	4
Tara George (Fort William)	4	5
Kim Moore (North Halton)	3	6
Elaine Uhryn (Soo)	3	6
Dawn Schwar (Sudbury)	1	8

== Round robin scores ==
=== Draw 1 ===
January 24

- McGhee 6-5 Moore
- Cadorin 7-4 Hanna
- Schwar 9-5 Uhryn
- Scarf 8-6 Brown
- Rizzo 8-5 George

=== Draw 2 ===
January 24

- George 9-5 Hanna
- Moore 7-4 Schwar
- McGhee 6-3 Brown
- Cadorin 8-4 Rizzo
- Scharf 8-2 Uhryn

=== Draw 3 ===
January 25

- Cadorin 6-3 Uhryn
- Brown 7-4 Rizzo
- Scharf 6-5 Moore
- George 7-1 Schwar
- Hanna 7-2 McGhee

=== Draw 4 ===
January 25

- Moore 7-6 Brown
- Uhryn 9-6 Hanna
- Cadorin 7-3 George
- McGhee 6-3 Scharf
- Rizzo 5-3 Schwar

=== Draw 5 ===
January 26

- McGhee 6-5 Schwar
- Scharf 7-0 George
- Cadorin 11-6 Moore
- Rizzo 7-3 Hanna
- Brown 7-6 Uhryn

=== Draw 6 ===
January 26

- Scharf 9-1 Rizzo
- Uhryn 7-6 McGhee
- Brown 6-4 Cadorin
- Hanna 9-3 Schwar
- Moore 6-4 George

=== Draw 7 ===
January 27

- Hanna 6-3 Brown
- Rizzo 8-1 Moore
- Scharf 6-1 Schwar
- George 8-3 Uhryn
- McGhee 8-1 Cadorin

=== Draw 8 ===
January 27

- Cadorin 7-6 Schwar
- Brown 8-6 George
- Uhryn 7-4 Moore
- Rizzo 5-4 McGhee
- Hanna 9-4 Scharf

=== Draw 9 ===
January 28

- Rizzo 8-1 Uhryn
- Cadorin 10-7 Scharf
- George 8-7 McGhee
- Hanna 9-4 Moore
- Brown 9-4 Schwar

== Tiebreakers ==
January 28 & 29

- McGhee 8-5 Brown
- Hanna 7-4 McGhee

== Playoffs ==
Page playoff system
1	Cadorin	2
2	Scharf	11
3	Rizzo	4
4	Hanna	10

Semifinal
1	Cadorin	5
4	Hanna	9

Final
2	Scharf	4
4	Hanna	6

=== 1 vs. 2 ===
January 29

Team	1	2	3	4	5	6	7	8	9	10	Final
Cadorin	0	1	0	1	0	0	0	X	X	X	2
Scharf	1	0	4	0	4	1	1	X	X	X	11

=== 3 vs. 4 ===
January 29

Team	1	2	3	4	5	6	7	8	9	10	Final
Rizzo	1	0	0	0	1	0	2	0	X	X	4
Hanna	0	4	0	1	0	1	0	4	X	X	10

=== Semifinal ===
January 30

Team	1	2	3	4	5	6	7	8	9	10	Final
Cadorin	0	0	2	0	1	0	0	2	0	X	5
Hanna	1	2	0	3	0	0	2	0	1	X	9

=== Final ===
January 30

Team	1	2	3	4	5	6	7	8	9	10	Final
Hanna	0	0	1	0	2	2	0	0	1	X	6
Scharf	0	1	0	1	0	0	1	1	0	X	4

2005 Ontario Scott Tournament of Hearts

Jenn Hanna
1st Ontario Provincial Championship title

== Qualification ==
Qualification method	Berths	Qualifying team
Northwestern Ontario	2	Krista Scharf; Tara George
Northeastern Ontario	2	Dawn Schwar; Elaine Uhryn
East Regional Qualifier	2	Jenn Hanna; Janet McGhee
West Regional Qualifier	2	Kim Moore; Jo-Ann Rizzo
Challenge Round Qualifiers	2	Kathy Brown; Chrissy Cadorin

=== Southern Ontario Zone winners ===
Regional winners in bold. Challenge round qualifiers in bold and italics.

Zone	Winner	Club
1A	**Jenn Hanna**	Ottawa
1B	Cheryl McBain	Ottawa
2A	Darcie Walker	Rideau
2B	Anne Merklinger	Rideau
3A	Tracy Samaan	Granite of West Ottawa
3B	Debra Karbashewski	Carleton Place
4A	Pauline Bakonyi	Quinte
4B	Joyce Potter*	Rideau
5A	Lisa Payne	Peterborough
5B	Jennifer Cowan	Beaverton
6A	**Kathy Brown**	Sutton
6B	**Janet McGhee**	Uxbridge
7A	Alison Goring	Bayview
7B	Delaine Payton	Scarboro
8A	Colleen Madonia	Mississaugua
8B	Kelly Cochrane	High Park
9A	**Kim Moore**	North Halton
9B	Kristy Russell	Brampton
10A	Sherry Middaugh	Coldwater
10B	Wanda Fleming	Elmvale
11A	Vicki Gregg	Paisley
11B	Anne Dunn*	Galt
12A	Dawn Sherk	Galt
12B	Elaine Voisin	Westmount
13A	Stacey Brandwood	Glendale
13B	Jordan Davies	Burlington
14A	Kori VanRyssel	Harriston
14B	Amy Mackay*	St. Catharines
15A	**Jo-Ann Rizzo**	Brant
15B	Karen Bell	Brant
16A	Amie Coward	Kingsville
16B	Carrie Lindner*	St. Catharines

* Fill in team from a different zone (not enough entries)
