= 2016 Ontario Scotties Tournament of Hearts =

Women's curling tournament

- Host city: Brampton, Ontario
- Arena: Brampton Curling Club
- Dates: January 18–24
- Winner: Jenn Hanna
- Curling club: Ottawa CC, Ottawa
- Skip: Jenn Hanna
- Third: Brit O'Neill
- Second: Stephanie Hanna
- Lead: Karen Sagle
- Coach: Bob Hanna
- Finalist: Rachel Homan

The 2016 Ontario Scotties Tournament of Hearts, the provincial women's curling championship for Southern Ontario, was held January 18 to 24 at the Brampton Curling Club in Brampton, Ontario. The winning Jenn Hanna rink represented Ontario at the 2016 Scotties Tournament of Hearts in Grande Prairie, Alberta.

The final featured two rinks from the Ottawa Curling Club, the #1 ranked team in the world, skipped by Rachel Homan against 2005 Tournament of Hearts runner up Jenn Hanna, making her first provincial appearance since 2012, after taking a few seasons off. Hanna beat the Homan team 10–8 in the final, an upset as the Homan team had only lost one event all season, and led both the World Curling Tour Order of Merit ranking and money list at the time (while Hanna was ranked 69th and 80th respectively).

== Qualification process ==
Qualifying for the provincial Scotties changed for 2016. Eight teams qualified from four regional qualifiers (two each) and a challenge round. The defending champion Julie Hastings rink and the top CTRS team (the Rachel Homan rink) also qualified.

Qualification method	Berths	Qualifying team
Defending champion	1	Julie Hastings
CTRS leader	1	Rachel Homan
East Qualifier	2	Sherry Middaugh; Cathy Auld
West Qualifier	2	Allison Flaxey; Julie Tippin
East Qualifier #2	2	Erin Morrissey; Jenn Hanna
West Qualifier #2	2	Jacqueline Harrison; Mallory Kean

== Teams ==
Skip	Third	Second	Lead	Alternate	Club(s)
Cathy Auld	Susan McKnight	Karen Rowsell	Casey Kidd	Jenna Bonner	Port Perry CC, Port Perry
Allison Flaxey	Clancy Grandy	Lynn Kreviazuk	Morgan Court		Guelph CC, Guelph
Jenn Hanna	Brit O'Neill	Stephanie Hanna	Karen Sagle	Pascale Letendre	Ottawa CC, Ottawa
Jacqueline Harrison	Janet Murphy	Stephanie Matheson	Melissa Foster	Nicole Westlund	Mississaugua G&CC, Mississauga
Julie Hastings	Christy Trombley	Stacey Smith	Katrina Collins	Cheryl McPherson	Bayview CC, Thornhill
Rachel Homan	Emma Miskew	Joanne Courtney	Lisa Weagle		Ottawa CC, Ottawa
Mallory Kean	Carly Howard	Kerilynn Mathers	Cheryl Kreviazuk		Westmount G&CC, Kitchener
Sherry Middaugh	Jo-Ann Rizzo	Lee Merklinger	Leigh Armstrong		Coldwater & District CC, Coldwater
Erin Morrissey	Lynsey Longfield	Erica Hopson	Jen Ahde		Ottawa CC, Ottawa
Julie Tippin	Chantal Lalonde	Rachelle Vink	Tess Bobbie	Kaitlyn Knipe	Woodstock CC, Woodstock

== Round-robin standings ==
Key
Teams to Playoffs

Skip (Club)	W	L	PF	PA	Ends Won	Ends Lost	Blank Ends	Stolen Ends
Rachel Homan (Ottawa)	8	1	71	39	40	29	5	8
Jacqueline Harrison (Mississaugua)	6	3	60	51	39	37	7	7
Julie Tippin (Woodstock)	6	3	62	51	42	32	10	15
Jenn Hanna (Ottawa)	6	3	62	48	38	33	14	7
Sherry Middaugh (Coldwater)	5	4	63	53	36	40	10	6
Cathy Auld (Port Perry)	4	5	61	58	39	38	10	8
Allison Flaxey (Guelph)	3	6	46	61	32	40	10	5
Julie Hastings (Bayview)	3	6	44	62	29	38	9	3
Mallory Kean (Westmount)	2	7	48	68	36	39	9	9
Erin Morrissey (Ottawa)	2	7	43	69	33	39	9	4

== Round-robin results ==
=== Draw 1 ===
Monday, January 18, 7:00 pm

Sheet 2	1	2	3	4	5	6	7	8	9	10	Final
Erin Morrissey	1	1	2	0	2	0	1	0	0	1	8
Sherry Middaugh 🔨	0	0	0	2	0	2	0	2	0	0	6

Sheet 3	1	2	3	4	5	6	7	8	9	10	Final
Rachel Homan 🔨	0	2	2	0	2	0	0	3	X	X	9
Jacqueline Harrison	1	0	0	2	0	0	1	0	X	X	4

Sheet 4	1	2	3	4	5	6	7	8	9	10	11	Final
Mallory Kean	2	0	1	0	1	0	1	2	0	0	1	8
Allison Flaxey 🔨	0	1	0	2	0	2	0	0	1	1	0	7

Sheet 5	1	2	3	4	5	6	7	8	9	10	Final
Julie Hastings	0	1	0	2	0	1	0	X	X	X	4
Cathy Auld 🔨	1	0	2	0	3	0	6	X	X	X	12

Sheet 6	1	2	3	4	5	6	7	8	9	10	Final
Julie Tippin 🔨	0	1	0	2	0	1	2	0	1	0	7
Jenn Hanna	1	0	1	0	2	0	0	1	0	1	6

=== Draw 2 ===
Tuesday, January 19, 2:00 pm

Sheet 2	1	2	3	4	5	6	7	8	9	10	Final
Rachel Homan 🔨	0	2	0	0	1	0	3	0	2	X	8
Julie Tippin	1	0	0	1	0	1	0	1	0	X	4

Sheet 3	1	2	3	4	5	6	7	8	9	10	Final
Sherry Middaugh 🔨	2	0	1	1	0	3	0	1	X	X	8
Allison Flaxey	0	1	0	0	1	0	1	0	X	X	3

Sheet 4	1	2	3	4	5	6	7	8	9	10	11	Final
Erin Morrissey	0	0	1	0	1	0	2	0	3	0	1	8
Cathy Auld 🔨	0	1	0	2	0	1	0	1	0	2	0	7

Sheet 5	1	2	3	4	5	6	7	8	9	10	Final
Jacqueline Harrison	0	1	0	0	2	0	1	0	1	X	5
Jenn Hanna 🔨	1	0	3	2	0	2	0	1	0	X	9

Sheet 6	1	2	3	4	5	6	7	8	9	10	Final
Mallory Kean	0	1	0	0	0	1	1	0	X	X	3
Julie Hastings 🔨	0	0	2	1	2	0	0	3	X	X	8

=== Draw 3 ===
Tuesday, January 19, 8:00 pm

Sheet 2	1	2	3	4	5	6	7	8	9	10	Final
Mallory Kean 🔨	0	3	0	1	0	1	0	0	1	0	6
Jacqueline Harrison	1	0	3	0	2	0	0	1	0	2	9

Sheet 3	1	2	3	4	5	6	7	8	9	10	Final
Cathy Auld 🔨	2	0	2	0	0	1	1	0	0	X	6
Jenn Hanna	0	0	0	1	0	0	0	0	1	X	2

Sheet 4	1	2	3	4	5	6	7	8	9	10	Final
Julie Hastings	0	0	0	0	0	0	0	2	0	X	2
Sherry Middaugh 🔨	0	0	2	0	0	1	2	0	2	X	7

Sheet 5	1	2	3	4	5	6	7	8	9	10	Final
Julie Tippin	1	0	4	0	0	2	0	2	X	X	9
Allison Flaxey 🔨	0	1	0	1	0	0	1	0	X	X	3

Sheet 6	1	2	3	4	5	6	7	8	9	10	Final
Rachel Homan 🔨	1	0	3	0	3	0	3	X	X	X	10
Erin Morrissey	0	1	0	1	0	1	0	X	X	X	3

=== Draw 4 ===
Wednesday, January 20, 1:00 pm

Sheet 2	1	2	3	4	5	6	7	8	9	10	Final
Sherry Middaugh	0	1	2	1	0	4	0	0	0	0	8
Cathy Auld 🔨	1	0	0	0	2	0	1	1	1	1	7

Sheet 3	1	2	3	4	5	6	7	8	9	10	Final
Mallory Kean	0	0	1	0	0	2	0	0	X	X	3
Rachel Homan 🔨	2	0	0	3	1	0	1	1	X	X	8

Sheet 4	1	2	3	4	5	6	7	8	9	10	Final
Jacqueline Harrison	0	2	0	2	0	0	2	1	1	X	8
Julie Tippin 🔨	2	0	1	0	0	2	0	0	0	X	5

Sheet 5	1	2	3	4	5	6	7	8	9	10	Final
Erin Morrissey 🔨	1	0	1	0	0	1	0	1	0	X	4
Julie Hastings	0	1	0	2	0	0	4	0	1	X	8

Sheet 6	1	2	3	4	5	6	7	8	9	10	Final
Jenn Hanna	0	0	1	0	0	1	1	0	0	3	6
Allison Flaxey 🔨	0	0	0	1	1	0	0	2	0	0	4

=== Draw 5 ===
Wednesday, January 20, 7:00 pm

Sheet 2	1	2	3	4	5	6	7	8	9	10	Final
Allison Flaxey	0	0	0	3	1	0	3	0	1	X	8
Erin Morrissey 🔨	0	1	1	0	0	1	0	2	0	X	5

Sheet 3	1	2	3	4	5	6	7	8	9	10	Final
Julie Hastings 🔨	0	1	0	2	0	2	0	1	0	1	7
Julie Tippin	1	0	1	0	1	0	2	0	1	0	6

Sheet 4	1	2	3	4	5	6	7	8	9	10	11	Final
Rachel Homan	1	0	2	0	0	1	0	1	0	2	1	8
Jenn Hanna 🔨	0	2	0	1	0	0	2	0	2	0	0	7

Sheet 5	1	2	3	4	5	6	7	8	9	10	Final
Sherry Middaugh 🔨	1	0	0	1	0	1	0	0	1	0	4
Jacqueline Harrison	0	1	0	0	1	0	0	1	0	3	6

Sheet 6	1	2	3	4	5	6	7	8	9	10	Final
Cathy Auld 🔨	1	0	0	1	1	0	0	3	0	1	7
Mallory Kean	0	0	1	0	0	2	1	0	2	0	6

=== Draw 6 ===
Thursday, January 21, 1:00 pm

Sheet 2	1	2	3	4	5	6	7	8	9	10	Final
Julie Hastings	0	0	0	2	0	2	0	0	X	X	4
Jenn Hanna 🔨	0	3	2	0	1	0	1	3	X	X	10

Sheet 3	1	2	3	4	5	6	7	8	9	10	Final
Erin Morrissey	0	2	0	1	0	0	0	1	0	X	4
Mallory Kean 🔨	3	0	1	0	1	0	1	0	1	X	7

Sheet 4	1	2	3	4	5	6	7	8	9	10	Final
Cathy Auld 🔨	1	0	0	1	0	2	0	0	1	1	6
Jacqueline Harrison	0	1	2	0	1	0	0	1	0	0	5

Sheet 5	1	2	3	4	5	6	7	8	9	10	Final
Allison Flaxey	0	0	1	0	0	0	0	X	X	X	1
Rachel Homan 🔨	0	2	0	2	0	2	3	X	X	X	9

Sheet 6	1	2	3	4	5	6	7	8	9	10	11	Final
Julie Tippin 🔨	2	1	0	2	0	1	1	0	1	0	1	9
Sherry Middaugh	0	0	3	0	2	0	0	1	0	2	0	8

=== Draw 7 ===
Thursday, January 21, 7:00 pm

Sheet 2	1	2	3	4	5	6	7	8	9	10	Final
Cathy Auld	0	0	0	2	0	0	1	0	1	0	4
Rachel Homan 🔨	0	0	1	0	2	3	0	1	0	1	8

Sheet 3	1	2	3	4	5	6	7	8	9	10	Final
Jenn Hanna 🔨	0	3	0	0	1	0	1	0	0	1	6
Sherry Middaugh	0	0	0	2	0	1	0	2	0	0	5

Sheet 4	1	2	3	4	5	6	7	8	9	10	Final
Allison Flaxey 🔨	0	1	0	0	2	0	0	1	2	X	6
Julie Hastings	0	0	2	1	0	1	0	0	0	X	4

Sheet 5	1	2	3	4	5	6	7	8	9	10	Final
Mallory Kean 🔨	0	0	1	0	0	0	1	1	0	X	3
Julie Tippin	0	0	0	2	3	2	0	0	1	X	8

Sheet 6	1	2	3	4	5	6	7	8	9	10	Final
Erin Morrissey 🔨	0	1	0	1	0	1	0	2	0	X	5
Jacqueline Harrison	1	0	2	0	2	0	2	0	2	X	9

=== Draw 8 ===
Friday, January 22, 1:00 pm

Sheet 2	1	2	3	4	5	6	7	8	9	10	Final
Jacqueline Harrison 🔨	0	1	1	0	1	0	0	2	0	1	6
Allison Flaxey	0	0	0	1	0	1	1	0	1	0	4

Sheet 3	1	2	3	4	5	6	7	8	9	10	Final
Julie Tippin	0	1	1	0	2	1	1	0	0	1	7
Cathy Auld 🔨	0	0	0	4	0	0	0	2	0	0	6

Sheet 4	1	2	3	4	5	6	7	8	9	10	Final
Sherry Middaugh	0	1	0	3	0	2	0	0	0	2	8
Mallory Kean 🔨	1	0	1	0	2	0	1	1	1	0	7

Sheet 5	1	2	3	4	5	6	7	8	9	10	Final
Jenn Hanna 🔨	2	0	0	1	0	2	1	0	1	X	7
Erin Morrissey	0	0	1	0	1	0	0	2	0	X	4

Sheet 6	1	2	3	4	5	6	7	8	9	10	Final
Julie Hastings	0	1	0	0	1	0	1	0	1	X	4
Rachel Homan 🔨	1	0	2	1	0	1	0	1	0	X	6

=== Draw 9 ===
Friday, January 22, 7:00 pm

Sheet 2	1	2	3	4	5	6	7	8	9	10	Final
Jenn Hanna 🔨	0	0	3	0	1	0	4	0	1	X	9
Mallory Kean	0	0	0	2	0	2	0	1	0	X	5

Sheet 3	1	2	3	4	5	6	7	8	9	10	Final
Jacqueline Harrison 🔨	1	0	2	0	2	0	3	X	X	X	8
Julie Hastings	0	1	0	1	0	1	0	X	X	X	3

Sheet 4	1	2	3	4	5	6	7	8	9	10	Final
Julie Tippin	0	2	0	1	1	0	0	3	X	X	7
Erin Morrissey 🔨	0	0	2	0	0	0	0	0	X	X	2

Sheet 5	1	2	3	4	5	6	7	8	9	10	Final
Rachel Homan	0	1	0	2	0	0	2	0	X	X	5
Sherry Middaugh 🔨	2	0	1	0	4	1	0	1	X	X	9

Sheet 6	1	2	3	4	5	6	7	8	9	10	Final
Allison Flaxey 🔨	2	0	2	0	3	0	1	0	0	2	10
Cathy Auld	0	1	0	2	0	1	0	1	1	0	6

== Playoffs ==
Page playoff system
1	Rachel Homan	9
2	Jacqueline Harrison	5
3	Julie Tippin	3
4	Jenn Hanna	7

Semifinal
2	Jacqueline Harrison	5
4	Jenn Hanna	6

Final
1	Rachel Homan	8
4	Jenn Hanna	10

=== 1 vs. 2 ===
Saturday, January 23, 2:00 pm

Team	1	2	3	4	5	6	7	8	9	10	Final
Rachel Homan 🔨	0	3	0	3	0	0	0	2	0	1	9
Jacqueline Harrison	1	0	1	0	1	1	0	0	1	0	5

=== 3 vs. 4 ===
Saturday, January 23, 7:00 pm

Team	1	2	3	4	5	6	7	8	9	10	Final
Julie Tippin 🔨	0	0	1	0	0	2	0	0	0	X	3
Jenn Hanna	0	0	0	3	0	0	2	2	0	X	7

=== Semifinal ===
Sunday, January 24, 9:00 am

Team	1	2	3	4	5	6	7	8	9	10	Final
Jacqueline Harrison 🔨	0	0	2	0	1	1	0	1	0	0	5
Jenn Hanna	0	0	0	2	0	0	1	0	1	2	6

=== Final ===
Sunday, January 24, 2:00 pm

Team	1	2	3	4	5	6	7	8	9	10	Final
Rachel Homan 🔨	1	0	2	0	2	0	0	0	2	1	8
Jenn Hanna	0	3	0	1	0	1	2	3	0	0	10

Player percentages
Homan		Hanna	
Lisa Weagle	92%	Karen Sagle	88%
Joanne Courtney	80%	Stephanie Hanna	80%
Emma Miskew	96%	Brit O'Neill	88%
Rachel Homan	77%	Jenn Hanna	93%
Total	86%	Total	87%

2016 Ontario Scotties Tournament of Hearts

Jenn Hanna
2nd Ontario Provincial Championship title

== Qualification ==
East and west regional qualifiers ran from December 18-December 21, 2015. Two teams from each region qualified. A second set of qualifiers was held in each region on January 8–10.

=== East Qualifier ===
December 18–20, at the RCMP Curling Club, Ottawa

Teams entered:

- Cathy Auld (Port Perry)
- Celeste Butler-Rohland (Ottawa)
- Nicole Butler-Rohland (Rideau)
- Jenn Hanna (Ottawa)
- Danielle Inglis (Ottawa Hunt)
- Cassandra Lewin (RCMP)
- Kayla MacMillan (Rideau)
- Sherry Middaugh (Coldwater)
- Erin Morrissey (Ottawa)
- Samantha Peters (Rideau)
- Rhonda Varnes (Rideau)

A side
Celeste Butler-Rohland	4
Kayla MacMillan	6
Danielle Inglis	9
Nicole Butler-Rohland	3
Samantha Peters	5
Cassandra Lewin	9

Quarterfinal
Sherry Middaugh	6
Kayla MacMillan	2
Erin Morrissey	3
Jenn Hanna	7
Danielle Inglis	7
Rhonda Varnes	8
Cassandra Lewin	5
Cathy Auld	9

Semifinal
Sherry Middaugh	7
Jenn Hanna	4
Rhonda Varnes	2
Cathy Auld	8

Final
Sherry Middaugh	6
Cathy Auld	3

B side
Nicole Butler-Rohland	8
Samantha Peters	9
Celeste Butler-Rohland	3
Danielle Inglis	5
Kayla MacMillan	7
Cassandra Lewin	3

Quarterfinals
Samantha Peters	3
Danielle Inglis	6
Erin Morrissey	5
Kayla MacMillan	13

Semifinals
Rhonda Varnes	2
Danielle Inglis	8
Jenn Hanna	7
Kayla MacMillan	1

Finals
Danielle Inglis	3
Jenn Hanna	7
Final
Cathy Auld	8
Jenn Hanna	4

=== West Qualifier ===
December 19–21, at the Guelph Curling Club, Guelph

Teams entered:

- Megan Balsdon (Dixie)
- Chrissy Cadorin (Thornhill)
- Katie Cottrill (Listowel)
- Courtney de Winter (Richmond Hill)
- Allison Flaxey (Guelph)
- Michelle Fletcher (Burlington)
- Susan Froud (Stroud)
- Karri-Lee Grant (Thornhill)
- Jacqueline Harrison (Mississaugua)
- Tracey Jones (Arthur)
- Emma Joyce (Lindsay)
- Mallory Kean (Westmount)
- Kerry Lackie (Westmount)
- Julie Tippin (Woodstock)
- Stephanie Van Huyse (Tam Heather)
- Ashley Waye (Royals)

A side
Allison Flaxey	10
Emma Joyce	5
Ashley Waye	8
Kerry Lackie	9
Megan Balsdon	6
Courtney de Winter	4
Michelle Fletcher	7
Mallory Kean	10
Julie Tippin	8
Karri-Lee Grant	2
Katie Cottrill	3
Susan Froud	7
Stephanie Van Huyse	8
Chrissy Cadorin	5
Tracey Jones	3
Jacqueline Harrison	10

Quarterfinal
Allison Flaxey	7
Kerry Lackie	3
Megan Balsdon	4
Mallory Kean	10
Julie Tippin	7
Susan Froud	3
Stephanie Van Huyse	2
Jacqueline Harrison	6

Semifinal
Allison Flaxey	9
Mallory Kean	3
Julie Tippin	6
Jacqueline Harrison	5

Final
Allison Flaxey	6
Julie Tippin	5

B Side (Top half)
Emma Joyce	3
Ashley Waye	9
Courtney de Winter	3
Michelle Fletcher	10

Semifinals
Ashley Waye	5
Stephanie Van Huyse	7
Michelle Fletcher	4
Susan Froud	9

Finals
Susan Froud	6
Stephanie Van Huyse	10

B Side (Bottom half)
Katie Cottrill	1
Karri-Lee Grant	9
Tracey Jones	10
Chrissy Cadorin	1

Semifinals
Megan Balsdon	4
Karri-Lee Grant	13
Tracey Jones	2
Kerry Lackie	5

Finals
Karri-Lee Grant	10
Kerry Lackie	3

B Side		Semifinal		B Final
				Julie Tippin	5
Stephanie Van Huyse	6			Stephanie Van Huyse	4
Mallory Kean	5	Stephanie Van Huyse	6
Karri-Lee Grant	2	Jacqueline Harrison	4
Jacqueline Harrison	8

=== East Qualifier #2 ===
January 8–10 at the West Northumberland Curling Club, Cobourg

Notes:

- Courtney de Winter, Susan Froud, Ashley Waye and Stephanie Van Huyse transfer from West

New teams (not in first qualifier):

- Diana Favel (Rideau)

A side
Celeste Butler-Rohland	8
Courtney de Winter	5
Susan Froud	8
Diana Favel	5

Quarterfinal
Danielle Inglis	9
Stephanie Van Huyse	5
Celeste Butler-Rohland	6
Rhonda Varnes	7
Susan Froud	6
Jenn Hanna	8
Erin Morrissey	9
Ashley Waye	6

Semifinal
Danielle Inglis	5
Rhonda Varnes	6
Jenn Hanna	7
Erin Morrissey	9

Final
Rhonda Varnes	7
Erin Morrissey	8

B side
Diana Favel	7
Stephanie Van Huyse	8
Courtney de Winter	2
Ashley Waye	7

Quarterfinals
Stephanie Van Huyse	8
Celeste Butler-Rohland	4
Susan Froud	7
Ashley Waye	3

Semifinals
Jenn Hanna	10
Stephanie Van Huyse	8
Danielle Inglis	8
Susan Froud	5

Finals
Jenn Hanna	8
Danielle Inglis	4
Final
Rhonda Varnes	4
Jenn Hanna	5

=== West Qualifier #2 ===
January 9–10 at the Listowel Curling Club, Listowel

A Side		Semifinal		Final
		Megan Balsdon	8
		Mallory Kean	4
				Megan Balsdon	4
Kerry Lackie	4			Jacqueline Harrison	6
Katie Cottrill	9	Katie Cottrill	4
		Jacqueline Harrison	9

B Side		Semifinal		Final
				Megan Balsdon	5
Kerry Lackie	6			Mallory Kean	6
Mallory Kean	8	Mallory Kean	8
		Katie Cottrill	2
