= 2016 Scotties Tournament of Hearts =

Canadian curling tournament

- Host city: Grande Prairie, Alberta
- Arena: Revolution Place
- Dates: February 20–28
- Attendance: 36,854
- Winner: Alberta
- Curling club: The Glencoe Club, Calgary
- Skip: Chelsea Carey
- Third: Amy Nixon
- Second: Jocelyn Peterman
- Lead: Laine Peters
- Alternate: Susan O'Connor
- Coach: Charley Thomas
- Finalist: Northern Ontario (Krista McCarville)

The 2016 Scotties Tournament of Hearts was held from February 20 to 28 at Revolution Place in Grande Prairie, Alberta. The winning team represented Canada at the 2016 World Women's Curling Championship held from March 19 to 27 at the Credit Union iPlex in Swift Current, Saskatchewan.

== Teams ==
The 2016 Scotties is as notable for who did not qualify for the event as who did. Notably absent is the #1 ranked team in the world, Rachel Homan, who was defeated in the Ontario final by her club-mates, 2005 Hearts runner-up Jenn Hanna, who is representing Ontario. The 2015 runner up Val Sweeting rink lost in the Alberta final to the Chelsea Carey rink, the #5 ranked Tracy Fleury lost in the Northern Ontario final to 2010 Scotties bronze medalist Krista McCarville and the #8 ranked Stefanie Lawton rink lost in the Saskatchewan final to Jolene Campbell. The headline team for the 2016 Scotties is the defending Scotties and Olympic champion, Jennifer Jones who is representing Team Canada. Also returning from 2015 is the Suzanne Birt rink from Prince Edward Island, the Sylvie Robichaud rink from New Brunswick and the Kerry Galusha rink from the Northwest Territories. 2004 Canadian Junior champion Jill Brothers is representing Nova Scotia for the second time as skip. 2004 Hearts runner-up Marie-France Larouche is representing Quebec for the 7th time as skip, in her first Scotties since 2012. 2007 Canadian Junior champion Stacie Curtis is representing Newfoundland and Labrador for the third time as skip. Skipping the Yukon team was Nicole Baldwin, returning to the Hearts for the first time since 2007. Making their Scotties debut is Kerri Einarson from Manitoba and Karla Thompson from British Columbia, while Nunavut was represented for the first time ever in the Scotties, and was skipped by Geneva Chislett.

The teams are listed as follows:

Canada	Alberta	British Columbia
St. Vital CC, Winnipeg Skip: Jennifer Jones; Third: Kaitlyn Lawes; Second: Jill Officer; Lead: Dawn McEwen; Alternate: Jennifer Clark-Rouire	The Glencoe Club, Calgary Skip: Chelsea Carey; Third: Amy Nixon; Second: Jocelyn Peterman; Lead: Laine Peters; Alternate: Susan O'Connor	Kamloops CC, Kamloops Skip: Karla Thompson; Third: Kristen Recksiedler; Second: Tracey Lavery; Lead: Trysta Vandale; Alternate: Sasha Carter
Manitoba	New Brunswick	Newfoundland and Labrador
East St. Paul CC, East St. Paul Skip: Kerri Einarson; Third: Selena Kaatz; Second: Liz Fyfe; Lead: Kristin MacCuish; Alternate: Briane Meilleur	Curl Moncton, Moncton Skip: Sylvie Robichaud; Third: Rebecca Atkinson; Second: Marie Richard; Lead: Jane Boyle; Alternate: Nicole Arsenault Bishop	St. John's CC, St. John's Skip: Stacie Curtis; Third: Erin Porter; Second: Julie Devereaux; Lead: Carrie Vautour; Alternate: Lauren Wasylkiw
Northern Ontario	Nova Scotia	Ontario
Fort William CC, Thunder Bay Skip: Krista McCarville; Third: Kendra Lilly; Second: Ashley Sippala; Lead: Sarah Potts; Alternate: Oye-Sem Won Briand	Mayflower CC, Halifax Skip: Jill Brothers; Third: Sarah Murphy; Second: Blisse Joyce; Lead: Teri Udle; Alternate: Jenn Brine	Ottawa CC, Ottawa Skip: Jenn Hanna; Third: Brit O'Neill; Second: Stephanie Hanna; Lead: Karen Sagle; Alternate: Pascale Letendre
Prince Edward Island	Quebec	Saskatchewan
Charlottetown CC, Charlottetown Skip: Suzanne Birt; Third: Robyn Green; Second: Meaghan Hughes; Lead: Marie Christianson; Alternate: Sinead Dolan	CC Etchemin, Saint-Romuald Skip: Marie-France Larouche; Third: Brenda Nicholls; Second: Annie Lemay; Lead: Julie Rainville; Alternate: Amélie Blais	Highland CC, Regina Skip: Jolene Campbell; Third: Ashley Howard; Second: Callan Hamon; Lead: Ashley Williamson; Alternate: Candace Chisholm
Northwest Territories	Nunavut	Yukon
Yellowknife CC, Yellowknife Skip: Kerry Galusha; Third: Megan Cormier; Second: Danielle Derry; Lead: Shona Barbour; Alternate: Sharon Cormier	Iqaluit CC, Iqaluit Skip: Geneva Chislett; Third: Denise Hutchings; Second: Robyn Mackey; Lead: Jenine Bodner; Alternate: Sadie Pinksen	Whitehorse CC, Whitehorse Skip: Nicole Baldwin; Third: Stephanie Jackson-Baier; Second: Rhonda Horte; Lead: Ladene Shaw; Alternate: Sandra Mikkelsen

=== CTRS ranking ===
Member Association (Skip)	Rank	Points
Canada (Jones)	2	359.989
Alberta (Carey)	4	254.504
Manitoba (Einarson)	7	214.270
Northern Ontario (McCarville)	13	139.022
Prince Edward Island (Birt)	24	85.349
Nova Scotia (Brothers)	29	74.206
Saskatchewan (Campbell)	30	73.977
Ontario (Hanna)	33	72.185
Quebec (Larouche)	47	40.013
British Columbia (Thompson)	48	39.886
New Brunswick (Robichaud)	55	33.972
Northwest Territories (Galusha)	87	13.408
Newfoundland and Labrador (Curtis)	114	3.047
Nunavut (Chislett)	NR	0.000
Yukon (Baldwin)	NR	0.000

== Map of teams ==
Team Canada Provincial Winners

== Pre-qualifying tournament ==
=== Standings ===
Final Round Robin Standings

Locale	Skip	W	L	PF	PA	EW	EL	BE	SE	S%
British Columbia	Karla Thompson	2	1	23	18	14	15	1	2	73%
Northwest Territories	Kerry Galusha	2	1	29	17	17	10	2	6	74%
Yukon	Nicole Baldwin	1	2	23	19	14	12	1	6	71%
Nunavut	Geneva Chislett	1	2	11	32	8	16	2	1	45%

=== Results ===
All draw times are listed in Mountain Standard Time (UTC−7).

==== Draw 1 ====
Thursday, February 18, 7:00 pm

Sheet C	1	2	3	4	5	6	7	8	9	10	Final
Nunavut (Chislett)	2	0	1	0	3	0	1	0	1	0	8
British Columbia (Thompson) 🔨	0	1	0	1	0	2	0	2	0	1	7

Sheet D	1	2	3	4	5	6	7	8	9	10	Final
Northwest Territories (Galusha) 🔨	1	0	1	3	0	2	0	0	1	2	10
Yukon (Baldwin)	0	1	0	0	4	0	1	1	0	0	7

==== Draw 2 ====
Friday, February 19, 7:30 am

Sheet A	1	2	3	4	5	6	7	8	9	10	Final
British Columbia (Thompson) 🔨	1	0	2	0	2	1	2	0	0	X	8
Yukon (Baldwin)	0	1	0	1	0	0	0	1	1	X	4

Sheet B	1	2	3	4	5	6	7	8	9	10	Final
Nunavut (Chislett)	0	1	0	0	0	0	0	1	X	X	2
Northwest Territories (Galusha) 🔨	3	0	2	0	3	3	2	0	X	X	13

==== Draw 3 ====
Friday, February 19, 4:20 pm

Sheet C	1	2	3	4	5	6	7	8	9	10	Final
Yukon (Baldwin) 🔨	2	0	0	1	1	2	3	3	X	X	12
Nunavut (Chislett)	0	0	1	0	0	0	0	0	X	X	1

Sheet D	1	2	3	4	5	6	7	8	9	10	11	Final
British Columbia (Thompson)	0	0	1	0	2	0	0	3	0	0	2	8
Northwest Territories (Galusha) 🔨	1	1	0	1	0	1	0	0	1	1	0	6

=== Pre-qualifying final ===
Saturday, February 20, 1:30 pm

Sheet B	1	2	3	4	5	6	7	8	9	10	Final
British Columbia (Thompson) 🔨	0	1	0	0	3	0	1	0	2	1	8
Northwest Territories (Galusha)	0	0	1	0	0	2	0	2	0	0	5

== Round robin standings ==
Final Round Robin Standings

Key
Teams to Playoffs
Team relegated to 2017 Pre-qualifying Tournament

Locale	Skip	W	L	PF	PA	EW	EL	BE	SE	S%
Alberta	Chelsea Carey	9	2	78	59	47	40	17	11	84%
Canada	Jennifer Jones	9	2	90	59	49	42	6	9	87%
Manitoba	Kerri Einarson	7	4	81	75	46	48	12	9	82%
Northern Ontario	Krista McCarville	7	4	80	64	49	42	16	16	82%
Ontario	Jenn Hanna	6	5	62	62	47	41	17	15	83%
Saskatchewan	Jolene Campbell	6	5	73	70	44	46	11	9	82%
Nova Scotia	Jill Brothers	6	5	71	70	39	41	14	11	79%
Quebec	Marie-France Larouche	5	6	63	64	40	47	14	9	80%
Prince Edward Island	Suzanne Birt	4	7	59	68	40	41	19	12	79%
Newfoundland and Labrador	Stacie Curtis	3	8	59	75	41	45	15	9	79%
British Columbia	Karla Thompson	2	9	55	87	38	49	15	5	74%
New Brunswick	Sylvie Robichaud	2	9	59	74	44	45	17	7	79%

== Round robin results ==
All draw times are listed in Mountain Standard Time (UTC−7).

=== Draw 1 ===
Saturday, February 20, 1:30 pm

Sheet A	1	2	3	4	5	6	7	8	9	10	Final
Quebec (Larouche) 🔨	0	1	0	2	0	0	2	0	4	X	9
Ontario (Hanna)	1	0	1	0	1	1	0	1	0	X	5

Sheet C	1	2	3	4	5	6	7	8	9	10	Final
Alberta (Carey) 🔨	0	1	4	0	1	0	1	0	5	X	12
Canada (Jones)	0	0	0	1	0	1	0	3	0	X	5

Sheet D	1	2	3	4	5	6	7	8	9	10	Final
Saskatchewan (Campbell)	0	1	0	5	0	0	4	0	1	X	11
Nova Scotia (Brothers) 🔨	1	0	2	0	0	2	0	2	0	X	7

=== Draw 2 ===
Saturday, February 20, 6:30 pm

Sheet A	1	2	3	4	5	6	7	8	9	10	Final
Prince Edward Island (Birt) 🔨	1	0	0	6	0	1	0	0	1	X	9
Newfoundland and Labrador (Curtis)	0	0	1	0	2	0	1	1	0	X	5

Sheet B	1	2	3	4	5	6	7	8	9	10	Final
Northern Ontario (McCarville) 🔨	0	0	2	0	1	0	1	0	1	1	6
New Brunswick (Robichaud)	0	0	0	1	0	0	0	2	0	0	3

Sheet C	1	2	3	4	5	6	7	8	9	10	Final
British Columbia (Thompson) 🔨	1	0	0	0	0	0	0	1	X	X	2
Manitoba (Einarson)	0	3	0	0	1	2	4	0	X	X	10

=== Draw 3 ===
Sunday, February 21, 8:30 am

Sheet A	1	2	3	4	5	6	7	8	9	10	Final
Nova Scotia (Brothers) 🔨	0	0	1	3	4	1	0	0	X	X	9
Manitoba (Einarson)	0	1	0	0	0	0	1	1	X	X	3

Sheet B	1	2	3	4	5	6	7	8	9	10	Final
Newfoundland and Labrador (Curtis)	0	0	0	0	1	1	0	0	2	0	4
Alberta (Carey) 🔨	0	2	1	1	0	0	0	1	0	1	6

Sheet C	1	2	3	4	5	6	7	8	9	10	Final
Saskatchewan (Campbell) 🔨	0	0	2	0	0	2	0	1	0	0	5
Ontario (Hanna)	0	0	0	0	2	0	1	0	2	1	6

Sheet D	1	2	3	4	5	6	7	8	9	10	Final
Canada (Jones)	1	0	2	0	2	0	2	0	2	X	9
Prince Edward Island (Birt) 🔨	0	1	0	1	0	1	0	1	0	X	4

=== Draw 4 ===
Sunday, February 21, 1:30 pm

Sheet A	1	2	3	4	5	6	7	8	9	10	Final
British Columbia (Thompson)	0	0	0	2	0	0	1	0	2	X	5
Alberta (Carey) 🔨	0	2	1	0	2	0	0	3	0	X	8

Sheet B	1	2	3	4	5	6	7	8	9	10	Final
Quebec (Larouche)	0	2	0	3	4	0	1	0	X	X	10
Saskatchewan (Campbell) 🔨	1	0	1	0	0	1	0	1	X	X	4

Sheet C	1	2	3	4	5	6	7	8	9	10	11	Final
Nova Scotia (Brothers)	0	2	1	1	0	1	0	2	0	0	0	7
Northern Ontario (McCarville) 🔨	0	0	0	0	1	0	2	0	2	2	2	9

Sheet D	1	2	3	4	5	6	7	8	9	10	Final
Newfoundland and Labrador (Curtis) 🔨	0	0	1	0	0	2	0	1	0	X	4
New Brunswick (Robichaud)	0	2	0	0	2	0	1	0	2	X	7

=== Draw 5 ===
Sunday, February 21, 6:30 pm

Sheet A	1	2	3	4	5	6	7	8	9	10	Final
Northern Ontario (McCarville) 🔨	1	0	1	0	2	0	1	1	0	2	8
Canada (Jones)	0	2	0	2	0	2	0	0	1	0	7

Sheet B	1	2	3	4	5	6	7	8	9	10	Final
Ontario (Hanna) 🔨	0	0	1	0	0	1	1	0	0	X	3
Manitoba (Einarson)	0	0	0	3	2	0	0	0	0	X	5

Sheet C	1	2	3	4	5	6	7	8	9	10	11	Final
Prince Edward Island (Birt) 🔨	0	2	4	0	0	0	1	0	1	0	1	9
New Brunswick (Robichaud)	1	0	0	1	1	0	0	3	0	2	0	8

Sheet D	1	2	3	4	5	6	7	8	9	10	Final
Quebec (Larouche)	1	1	1	0	1	0	0	0	2	0	6
British Columbia (Thompson) 🔨	0	0	0	2	0	0	2	2	0	1	7

=== Draw 6 ===
Monday, February 22, 1:30 pm

Sheet A	1	2	3	4	5	6	7	8	9	10	Final
Saskatchewan (Campbell)	0	0	1	0	4	0	2	0	X	X	7
New Brunswick (Robichaud) 🔨	0	0	0	1	0	1	0	1	X	X	3

Sheet B	1	2	3	4	5	6	7	8	9	10	Final
Nova Scotia (Brothers) 🔨	1	0	0	2	0	1	0	0	0	3	7
British Columbia (Thompson)	0	0	1	0	1	0	1	0	1	0	4

Sheet C	1	2	3	4	5	6	7	8	9	10	Final
Newfoundland and Labrador (Curtis) 🔨	1	0	2	0	2	3	0	0	2	X	10
Quebec (Larouche)	0	1	0	2	0	0	1	2	0	X	6

Sheet D	1	2	3	4	5	6	7	8	9	10	Final
Alberta (Carey) 🔨	0	0	3	3	0	0	2	1	0	0	9
Northern Ontario (McCarville)	0	2	0	0	2	1	0	0	2	1	8

=== Draw 7 ===
Monday, February 22, 6:30 pm

Sheet A	1	2	3	4	5	6	7	8	9	10	Final
Alberta (Carey) 🔨	0	1	0	0	1	0	0	1	0	2	5
Prince Edward Island (Birt)	0	0	1	1	0	1	0	0	1	0	4

Sheet B	1	2	3	4	5	6	7	8	9	10	Final
Canada (Jones) 🔨	1	0	2	0	1	0	1	0	0	1	6
Newfoundland and Labrador (Curtis)	0	1	0	1	0	1	0	0	1	0	4

Sheet C	1	2	3	4	5	6	7	8	9	10	Final
Manitoba (Einarson)	0	0	1	0	0	2	0	1	0	X	4
Saskatchewan (Campbell) 🔨	0	1	0	3	1	0	1	0	2	X	8

Sheet D	1	2	3	4	5	6	7	8	9	10	Final
Nova Scotia (Brothers) 🔨	1	1	0	4	1	1	0	0	0	0	8
Ontario (Hanna)	0	0	2	0	0	0	1	2	1	1	7

=== Draw 8 ===
Tuesday, February 23, 8:30 am

Sheet A	1	2	3	4	5	6	7	8	9	10	Final
Ontario (Hanna)	0	0	2	0	0	1	0	0	2	1	6
British Columbia (Thompson) 🔨	0	1	0	1	2	0	1	0	0	0	5

Sheet B	1	2	3	4	5	6	7	8	9	10	Final
Manitoba (Einarson) 🔨	0	1	1	0	1	0	0	2	0	0	5
Quebec (Larouche)	0	0	0	3	0	1	0	0	0	2	6

Sheet C	1	2	3	4	5	6	7	8	9	10	Final
Northern Ontario (McCarville)	0	2	1	0	2	4	0	0	0	1	10
Prince Edward Island (Birt) 🔨	4	0	0	2	0	0	0	0	2	0	8

Sheet D	1	2	3	4	5	6	7	8	9	10	Final
New Brunswick (Robichaud) 🔨	2	0	1	0	1	0	1	0	1	X	6
Canada (Jones)	0	5	0	1	0	2	0	1	0	X	9

=== Draw 9 ===
Tuesday, February 23, 1:30 pm

Sheet A	1	2	3	4	5	6	7	8	9	10	Final
Newfoundland and Labrador (Curtis) 🔨	0	1	0	0	1	0	1	0	1	X	4
Northern Ontario (McCarville)	0	0	0	3	0	2	0	2	0	X	7

Sheet B	1	2	3	4	5	6	7	8	9	10	Final
New Brunswick (Robichaud)	0	0	2	1	0	1	0	0	0	0	4
Alberta (Carey) 🔨	0	2	0	0	2	0	1	0	0	1	6

Sheet C	1	2	3	4	5	6	7	8	9	10	Final
Quebec (Larouche) 🔨	0	0	1	0	1	0	1	0	0	2	5
Nova Scotia (Brothers)	0	0	0	1	0	2	0	1	0	0	4

Sheet D	1	2	3	4	5	6	7	8	9	10	Final
British Columbia (Thompson) 🔨	0	2	0	1	0	1	0	0	2	1	7
Saskatchewan (Campbell)	1	0	1	0	4	0	1	1	0	0	8

=== Draw 10 ===
Tuesday, February 23, 6:30 pm

Sheet A	1	2	3	4	5	6	7	8	9	10	Final
Canada (Jones) 🔨	1	2	0	2	0	5	0	1	X	X	11
Saskatchewan (Campbell)	0	0	2	0	1	0	2	0	X	X	5

Sheet B	1	2	3	4	5	6	7	8	9	10	Final
Nova Scotia (Brothers) 🔨	0	1	0	1	0	2	0	3	0	X	7
Prince Edward Island (Birt)	0	0	2	0	1	0	1	0	1	X	5

Sheet C	1	2	3	4	5	6	7	8	9	10	Final
Ontario (Hanna) 🔨	1	0	0	2	2	0	0	2	0	X	7
Alberta (Carey)	0	1	0	0	0	1	2	0	1	X	5

Sheet D	1	2	3	4	5	6	7	8	9	10	Final
Manitoba (Einarson)	0	0	3	0	2	0	1	2	0	X	8
Newfoundland and Labrador (Curtis) 🔨	0	1	0	1	0	1	0	0	2	X	5

=== Draw 11 ===
Wednesday, February 24, 8:30 am

Sheet A	1	2	3	4	5	6	7	8	9	10	Final
New Brunswick (Robichaud) 🔨	0	2	0	1	0	1	0	1	2	0	7
Nova Scotia (Brothers)	0	0	2	0	4	0	1	0	0	1	8

Sheet B	1	2	3	4	5	6	7	8	9	10	Final
Saskatchewan (Campbell)	0	0	2	0	0	0	1	0	2	1	6
Northern Ontario (McCarville) 🔨	0	1	0	1	1	1	0	1	0	0	5

Sheet C	1	2	3	4	5	6	7	8	9	10	Final
British Columbia (Thompson) 🔨	0	0	3	0	2	0	0	2	0	0	7
Newfoundland and Labrador (Curtis)	2	2	0	2	0	0	2	0	0	2	10

Sheet D	1	2	3	4	5	6	7	8	9	10	Final
Quebec (Larouche)	0	0	1	2	0	0	1	0	0	X	4
Alberta (Carey) 🔨	0	2	0	0	0	1	0	2	1	X	6

=== Draw 12 ===
Wednesday, February 24, 1:30 pm

Sheet A	1	2	3	4	5	6	7	8	9	10	Final
Manitoba (Einarson) 🔨	0	3	1	0	1	0	2	1	0	3	11
Alberta (Carey)	1	0	0	2	0	2	0	0	2	0	7

Sheet B	1	2	3	4	5	6	7	8	9	10	Final
Newfoundland and Labrador (Curtis)	0	0	1	0	1	0	1	0	1	1	5
Ontario (Hanna) 🔨	0	2	0	1	0	1	0	0	0	0	4

Sheet C	1	2	3	4	5	6	7	8	9	10	Final
Nova Scotia (Brothers)	0	2	0	0	0	1	0	0	2	0	5
Canada (Jones) 🔨	1	0	1	0	1	0	0	2	0	2	7

Sheet D	1	2	3	4	5	6	7	8	9	10	Final
Saskatchewan (Campbell) 🔨	0	0	0	3	1	0	1	0	1	0	6
Prince Edward Island (Birt)	1	0	1	0	0	1	0	3	0	1	7

=== Draw 13 ===
Wednesday, February 24, 6:30 pm

Sheet A	1	2	3	4	5	6	7	8	9	10	Final
British Columbia (Thompson)	0	0	0	2	0	0	0	1	1	X	4
Prince Edward Island (Birt) 🔨	0	2	1	0	1	0	2	0	0	X	6

Sheet B	1	2	3	4	5	6	7	8	9	10	Final
Quebec (Larouche) 🔨	1	0	0	1	0	0	1	0	X	X	3
Canada (Jones)	0	2	3	0	1	1	0	3	X	X	10

Sheet C	1	2	3	4	5	6	7	8	9	10	Final
Manitoba (Einarson)	0	3	1	0	1	0	0	3	0	1	9
Northern Ontario (McCarville) 🔨	1	0	0	4	0	1	0	0	0	0	6

Sheet D	1	2	3	4	5	6	7	8	9	10	Final
Ontario (Hanna)	0	1	0	1	0	2	0	1	0	1	6
New Brunswick (Robichaud) 🔨	0	0	1	0	1	0	1	0	1	0	4

=== Draw 14 ===
Thursday, February 25, 8:30 am

Sheet A	1	2	3	4	5	6	7	8	9	10	Final
Saskatchewan (Campbell) 🔨	0	0	1	1	0	2	0	3	1	X	8
Newfoundland and Labrador (Curtis)	0	2	0	0	1	0	1	0	0	X	4

Sheet B	1	2	3	4	5	6	7	8	9	10	Final
Alberta (Carey)	2	0	4	0	1	0	0	1	X	X	8
Nova Scotia (Brothers) 🔨	0	1	0	0	0	1	0	0	X	X	2

Sheet C	1	2	3	4	5	6	7	8	9	10	Final
New Brunswick (Robichaud) 🔨	1	0	1	0	1	1	0	0	0	2	6
Quebec (Larouche)	0	1	0	1	0	0	2	0	1	0	5

Sheet D	1	2	3	4	5	6	7	8	9	10	Final
Northern Ontario (McCarville)	0	0	2	2	0	3	0	3	X	X	10
British Columbia (Thompson) 🔨	1	0	0	0	1	0	1	0	X	X	3

=== Draw 15 ===
Thursday, February 25, 1:30 pm

Sheet A	1	2	3	4	5	6	7	8	9	10	Final
Northern Ontario (McCarville)	0	1	1	0	2	0	1	1	1	X	7
Quebec (Larouche) 🔨	1	0	0	1	0	0	0	0	0	X	2

Sheet B	1	2	3	4	5	6	7	8	9	10	Final
New Brunswick (Robichaud) 🔨	1	0	0	1	0	1	0	2	0	X	5
British Columbia (Thompson)	0	2	0	0	2	0	1	0	2	X	7

Sheet C	1	2	3	4	5	6	7	8	9	10	Final
Prince Edward Island (Birt)	0	0	1	0	0	2	0	2	0	X	5
Ontario (Hanna) 🔨	0	1	0	2	3	0	1	0	1	X	8

Sheet D	1	2	3	4	5	6	7	8	9	10	Final
Manitoba (Einarson)	0	2	0	1	0	0	0	1	X	X	4
Canada (Jones) 🔨	2	0	2	0	0	2	2	0	X	X	8

=== Draw 16 ===
Thursday, February 25, 6:30 pm

Sheet A	1	2	3	4	5	6	7	8	9	10	Final
Ontario (Hanna)	0	0	2	0	0	0	1	0	1	X	4
Canada (Jones) 🔨	2	0	0	2	1	1	0	1	0	X	7

Sheet B	1	2	3	4	5	6	7	8	9	10	Final
Prince Edward Island (Birt) 🔨	0	2	0	1	0	0	1	1	1	1	7
Manitoba (Einarson)	2	0	3	0	1	2	0	0	0	0	8

Sheet C	1	2	3	4	5	6	7	8	9	10	Final
Alberta (Carey) 🔨	1	0	0	0	1	0	2	0	1	1	6
Saskatchewan (Campbell)	0	0	2	1	0	1	0	1	0	0	5

Sheet D	1	2	3	4	5	6	7	8	9	10	Final
Newfoundland and Labrador (Curtis)	0	1	0	1	0	2	0	0	0	X	4
Nova Scotia (Brothers) 🔨	0	0	1	0	2	0	1	2	1	X	7

=== Draw 17 ===
Friday, February 26, 8:30 am

Sheet A	1	2	3	4	5	6	7	8	9	10	Final
New Brunswick (Robichaud)	0	0	2	0	2	1	0	0	1	0	6
Manitoba (Einarson) 🔨	0	1	0	1	0	0	2	0	0	3	7

Sheet B	1	2	3	4	5	6	7	8	9	10	Final
Ontario (Hanna)	1	1	0	0	1	1	0	0	1	1	6
Northern Ontario (McCarville) 🔨	0	0	0	2	0	0	2	0	0	0	4

Sheet C	1	2	3	4	5	6	7	8	9	10	Final
Canada (Jones)	1	0	2	0	2	0	3	3	X	X	11
British Columbia (Thompson) 🔨	0	1	0	2	0	1	0	0	X	X	4

Sheet D	1	2	3	4	5	6	7	8	9	10	Final
Prince Edward Island (Birt) 🔨	0	1	0	0	0	0	0	1	0	X	2
Quebec (Larouche)	0	0	0	3	0	2	1	0	1	X	7

== Playoffs ==
Page playoff system
1	Alberta	7
2	Canada	5
3	Manitoba	5
4	Northern Ontario	7

Semifinal
2	Canada	5
4	Northern Ontario	7

Final
1	Alberta	7
4	Northern Ontario	6

Bronze Medal Game
2	Canada	8
3	Manitoba	7

=== 1 vs. 2 ===
Friday, February 26, 7:00 pm

Team	1	2	3	4	5	6	7	8	9	10	Final
Alberta (Carey) 🔨	2	0	0	0	2	1	0	2	0	X	7
Canada (Jones)	0	1	0	0	0	0	1	0	3	X	5

Player percentages
Alberta		Canada	
Laine Peters	86%	Dawn McEwen	98%
Jocelyn Peterman	91%	Jill Officer	88%
Amy Nixon	94%	Kaitlyn Lawes	86%
Chelsea Carey	96%	Jennifer Jones	80%
Total	92%	Total	88%

=== 3 vs. 4 ===
Saturday, February 27, 1:30 pm

Team	1	2	3	4	5	6	7	8	9	10	Final
Manitoba (Einarson) 🔨	0	1	0	2	1	0	1	0	0	0	5
Northern Ontario (McCarville)	0	0	1	0	0	1	0	2	1	2	7

Player percentages
Manitoba		Northern Ontario	
Kristin MacCuish	83%	Sarah Potts	95%
Liz Fyfe	84%	Ashley Sippala	78%
Selena Kaatz	76%	Kendra Lilly	80%
Kerri Einarson	78%	Krista McCarville	70%
Total	80%	Total	81%

=== Semifinal ===
Saturday, February 27, 6:30 pm

Team	1	2	3	4	5	6	7	8	9	10	Final
Canada (Jones) 🔨	2	0	2	0	0	0	1	0	0	0	5
Northern Ontario (McCarville)	0	1	0	1	0	1	0	1	2	1	7

Player percentages
Canada		Northern Ontario	
Dawn McEwen	89%	Sarah Potts	91%
Jill Officer	85%	Ashley Sippala	75%
Kaitlyn Lawes	88%	Kendra Lilly	79%
Jennifer Jones	73%	Krista McCarville	75%
Total	83%	Total	80%

=== Bronze medal game ===
Sunday, February 28, 1:30 pm

Team	1	2	3	4	5	6	7	8	9	10	Final
Canada (Jones) 🔨	2	0	0	2	0	1	0	2	0	1	8
Manitoba (Einarson)	0	1	1	0	3	0	1	0	1	0	7

Player percentages
Canada		Manitoba	
Dawn McEwen	96%	Kristin MacCuish	93%
Jill Officer	90%	Liz Fyfe	73%
Kaitlyn Lawes	81%	Selena Kaatz	76%
Jennifer Jones	79%	Kerri Einarson	80%
Total	87%	Total	80%

=== Final ===
Sunday, February 28, 6:30 pm

Team	1	2	3	4	5	6	7	8	9	10	Final
Alberta (Carey) 🔨	0	1	0	2	0	1	0	2	0	1	7
Northern Ontario (McCarville)	0	0	1	0	2	0	2	0	1	0	6

Player percentages
Alberta		Northern Ontario	
Laine Peters	83%	Sarah Potts	94%
Jocelyn Peterman	88%	Ashley Sippala	71%
Amy Nixon	90%	Kendra Lilly	88%
Chelsea Carey	88%	Krista McCarville	86%
Total	87%	Total	85%

== Statistics ==
Round Robin only

Key
First All-Star Team
Second All-Star Team

Leads	%
(Canada) Dawn McEwen	90
(Northern Ontario) Sarah Potts	87
(Quebec) Julie Rainville	86
(Ontario) Karen Sagle	86
(Alberta) Laine Peters	86
(Saskatchewan) Ashley Williamson	86

Seconds	%
(Canada) Jill Officer	87
(Manitoba) Liz Fyfe	87
(Ontario) Stephanie Hanna	86
(Prince Edward Island) Meaghan Hughes	83
(Northern Ontario) Ashley Sippala	81
(Alberta) Jocelyn Peterman	81
(Nova Scotia) Jenn Brine	81

Thirds	%
(Canada) Kaitlyn Lawes	86
(Saskatchewan) Ashley Howard	84
(Alberta) Amy Nixon	84
(Manitoba) Selena Kaatz	83
(Ontario) Brit O'Neill	82

Skips	%
(Canada) Jennifer Jones	85
(Alberta) Chelsea Carey	84
(Northern Ontario) Krista McCarville	80
(Ontario) Jenn Hanna	79
(Manitoba) Kerri Einarson	78
(New Brunswick) Sylvie Robichaud	78
(Saskatchewan) Jolene Campbell	78

== Awards ==
The awards and all-star teams are as follows:

All-Star Teams

First Team

- Skip: Jennifer Jones, Team Canada
- Third: Kaitlyn Lawes, Team Canada
- Second: Jill Officer, Team Canada
- Lead: Dawn McEwen, Team Canada

Second Team

- Skip: Chelsea Carey, Alberta
- Third: Ashley Howard, Saskatchewan
- Second: Liz Fyfe, Manitoba
- Lead: Sarah Potts, Northern Ontario

Note: All of the second all-star team members are daughters of former Brier champions. Chelsea Carey's father is Dan Carey, who won the Brier in 1992, Ashley Howard's father is Russ Howard, who won it in 1987 and 1993, Liz Fyfe's father Vic Peters won the Brier in 1992 and the father of Sarah Potts is Rick Lang, who won the Brier in 1975, 1982 and 1985.

Marj Mitchell Sportsmanship Award

- Ashley Howard, Saskatchewan

Joan Mead Builder Award

- Renée Sonnenberg, Grande Prairie-area volunteer junior coach, an executive director of the Peace Curling Association, and skip of Team Alberta at the 1999 and 2001 Scott Tournament of Hearts.

== Provincial and territorial playdowns ==
- 2016 Alberta Scotties Tournament of Hearts
- 2016 British Columbia Scotties Tournament of Hearts
- 2016 Manitoba Scotties Tournament of Hearts
- 2016 New Brunswick Scotties Tournament of Hearts
- 2016 Newfoundland and Labrador Scotties Tournament of Hearts
- 2016 Northern Ontario Scotties Tournament of Hearts
- 2016 Nova Scotia Scotties Tournament of Hearts
- 2016 Ontario Scotties Tournament of Hearts
- 2016 Prince Edward Island Scotties Tournament of Hearts
- 2016 Quebec Scotties Tournament of Hearts
- 2016 Saskatchewan Scotties Tournament of Hearts
- 2016 Northwest Territories Scotties Tournament of Hearts
- 2016 Yukon Scotties Tournament of Hearts
- 2016 Nunavut Scotties Tournament of Hearts
