= Mallory Kean =

Canadian curler

- Curler
- Born: Mallory Buist

Team
- Curling club: Woodstock CC, Woodstock, ON
- Skip: Chrissy Cadorin
- Third: Joanne Curtis
- Second: Mallory Kean
- Lead: Laura LaBonte

Curling career
- Member Association: Ontario

Mallory Kean (née Buist) is a Canadian curler from Woodstock, Ontario. She currently plays second for the Chrissy Cadorin rink on the World Curling Tour.

== Career ==
Kean began curling at age 7 at the Glendale Golf and Country Club in Hamilton, Ontario. As a junior career, Kean made it to the finals of the Ontario Bantam championship in 2004 (losing to Rachel Homan) and played in the 2004 Ontario Winter Games.

After juniors, Kean joined the Alison Goring rink, throwing second rocks for the 2011-12 season. She then joined the Brit O'Neill rink for the 2012-13 season, playing third, then the Ashley Waye for the 2013-14 season and then the Lisa Farnell rink for the 2014-15 season, playing third again. In 2015, Kean would form her own rink with Carly Howard, Kerilynn Mathers and Cheryl Kreviazuk. The rink would find immediate success in their first season together, making it to two WCT finals (the Oakville OCT Fall Classic and the Gord Carroll Curling Classic). The team would also qualify for the 2016 Ontario Scotties Tournament of Hearts, Kean's first.

Outside of the World Curling Tour, Kean has played in two Canadian Mixed Doubles Curling Trials, both times with husband Mark Kean. At the 2014 Canadian Mixed Doubles Curling Trials, the pair made it to the quarterfinals, before losing to Mike Armstrong and Ashley Quick of Saskatchewan. At the 2015 Canadian Mixed Doubles Curling Trials, the pair missed the playoffs.

== Personal life ==
Kean married 2015 Ontario Tankard champion Mark Kean in August 2014.

In July 2016, Mallory and Mark became Owners/City Managers for ShopWoodstock.com, a business powered by the ShopCity.com platform.
