= 2004 Ontario Scott Tournament of Hearts =

- Host city: Copper Cliff, Ontario
- Arena: Copper Cliff Curling Club
- Dates: January 27–February 1, 2004
- Winner: Team Middaugh
- Curling club: Coldwater & District Curling Club, Coldwater, Ontario
- Skip: Sherry Middaugh
- Third: Kirsten Wall
- Second: Andrea Lawes
- Lead: Sheri Cordina
- Finalist: Elaine Uhryn

The 2004 Ontario Scott Tournament of Hearts was held January 27-February 1 at the Copper Cliff Curling Club in Copper Cliff, Ontario. The Sherry Middaugh rink from Coldwater, Ontario won their third Ontario provincial title.

== Teams ==
Skip	Third	Second	Lead	Curling Club
Kathy Brown	Janet Langevin	Christine Loube	Heather Carr	Sutton Curling Club, Sutton West
Chrissy Cadorin	Michelle Gray	Leigh Armstrong	Stephanie Leachman	Orangeville Curling Club, Otangeville
Jenn Hanna	Joelle Sabourin	Dawn Askin	Stephanie Hanna	Ottawa Curling Club, Ottawa
Angela Lee	Amy Stachiw	Kelli Smith	Andrea Lee	Fort William Curling Club, Thunder Bay
Anne Merklinger	Darcie Walker	Denna Schell	Andrey Reddick	Rideau Curling Club, Ottawa
Sherry Middaugh	Kirsten Wall	Andrea Lawes	Sheri Cordina	Coldwater & District Curling Club, Coldwater
Jo-Ann Rizzo	Darlene Kidd	Julie Promoli	Vicki Advent	Brant Curling Club, Brantford
Krista Scharf	Angie Delpino	Ashley Kallos	Laura Armitage	Port Arthur Curling Club, Thunder Bay
Dawn Schwar	Margaret McLaughlin	Shannon Roy	Janice Vettoretti	Sudbury Curling Club, Sudbury
Elaine Uhryn	Kelly McLellan	Sherri Maguire	Karen Bonnefant	Soo Curlers Association, Saulte Ste. Marie

== Standings ==
Skip	W	L
Jenn Hanna (Ottawa)	8	1
Sherry Middaugh (Coldwater)	6	3
Elaine Uhryn (Soo)	5	4
Jo-Ann Rizzo (Brant)	5	4
Chrissy Cadorin (Orangeville)	5	4
Dawn Schwar (Sudbury)	4	5
Anne Merklinger (Rideau)	4	5
Krista Scharf (Port Arthur)	3	6
Angela Lee (Fort William)	3	6
Kathy Brown (Sutton)	2	7

== Tie breaker ==
- Rizzo 8-3 Cadorin

== Playoffs ==
Page playoff system
1	Jenn Hanna	4
2	Sherry Middaugh	10
3	Elaine Uhryn	10
4	Jo-Ann Rizzo	6

Semifinal
1	Jenn Hanna	6
3	Elaine Uhryn	7

Final
2	Sherry Middaugh	4
3	Elaine Uhryn	3
