= Jacqueline Harrison =

Canadian curler from Waterdown, Ontario

- Curler
- Born: Jacqueline Smith; July 28, 1978 (age 48); Niagara Falls, Ontario

Team
- Curling club: Mississaugua G&CC; Mississauga, ON
- Skip: Jacqueline Harrison
- Third: Allison Flaxey
- Second: Lynn Kreviazuk
- Lead: Laura Hickey

Curling career
- Member Association: Ontario
- Top CTRS ranking: 10th (2016–17)

Jacqueline Harrison (born July 28, 1978 in Niagara Falls, Ontario as Jacqueline Smith) is a Canadian curler from Waterdown, Ontario. Harrison currently skips a team on the World Curling Tour.

== Career ==
Harrison's junior career involved reaching the semi-finals of the 1999 Ontario Juniors, winning the 1999 Ontario University championship and the provincial junior mixed championship playing third for future Olympic champion John Morris. After juniors, Harrison would win the Ontario Curling Association Tim Hortons Trophy with skip Vicky Hysop. She has also played in two mixed provincials (2008 and 2009).

Harrison has played in eight provincial women's championships. In 2010, her Alliston Curling Club rink finished the round robin with a 5-4 record, and won a tie-breaker match to make the playoffs. In the playoffs, she won the 3 vs. 4 game, but lost in the semi-final to Tracy Horgan. Harrison would not return to the provincials until 2013, where her team finished with a 3–6 record. She played in her third provincials in In 2015, finishing the round robin with a 6–3 record. In the playoffs, she lost the 3 vs. 4 game against Clancy Grandy. She played in her fourth provincials the following year, once again finishing the round robin with a 6–3 record. This put her in the 1 vs. 2 game against Rachel Homan, which she lost. Harrison then lost to Jenn Hanna in the semifinal. Harrison made it to her third straight provincial championship in 2017. This time, her rink finished first in the round robin portion, with a 6–1 record. This gave her a bye to the final, which she lost against Homan. In 2018, Harrison played in her fourth straight provincials. There, her team went 3–3, before being eliminated in the triple knockout event. Harrison qualified for provincials again in 2019, but finished the round robin with a 3–4 record, missing the playoffs. She qualified again in 2020, going 2–6.

Harrison's first World Curling Tour event was in 2003. On the Tour she has won five events, the Oakville OCT Fall Classic, the Gord Carroll Curling Classic and Royal LePage OVCA Women's Fall Classic in 2015, and the GSOC Tour Challenge Tier 2 and Brantford Nissan Women's Classic events in 2016. She has played in ten Grand Slam events. Her first Grand Slam was the 2010 Players' Championships where her team went 2-3, just missing out on the playoffs by losing her final match. Her next Grand Slam was the 2010 Sobeys Slam where she finished with a 4-3 record, again missing out on the playoffs in her last match. Her third Slam of her career was the 2012 The Masters Grand Slam of Curling where she finished with a 3-2 record, losing in a qualifying match. She would not play in another slam until the 2016 Humpty's Champions Cup, where she finished with a 1–3 record. In the 2016–17 curling season, she had more success, going to the quarterfinals of the 2017 Meridian Canadian Open and the semifinals of the 2017 Humpty's Champions Cup. She played in three slams in the 2017–18 curling season, going 1–3 at both the 2017 Masters of Curling and the 2017 Boost National, while making it to the quarterfinals of the 2017 GSOC Tour Challenge. The next season, she played in one slam, making it to the quarter-finals of the 2018 Boost National.

Harrison played in the 2017 Canadian Olympic Pre-Trials, finishing with a 2–4 record. She had much more success at the 2021 Canadian Olympic Curling Pre-Trials, where she won the "B" final, qualifying her team for the 2021 Canadian Olympic Curling Trials, her first.

Outside of women's curling, Harrison has also played in one Canadian Mixed Doubles Curling Championship, in 2014. Her and partner Jay Allen went 1–6 at the 2014 Championship.

== Personal life ==
Harrison is a stay-at-home mother. She is married to James Harrison and has one child.

== Grand Slam record ==
Key
C	Champion
F	Lost in Final
SF	Lost in Semifinal
QF	Lost in Quarterfinals
R16	Lost in the round of 16
Q	Did not advance to playoffs
T2	Played in Tier 2 event
DNP	Did not participate in event
N/A	Not a Grand Slam event that season

Event	2009–10	2010–11	2011–12	2012–13	2013–14	2014–15	2015–16	2016–17	2017-18	2018-19
Masters	—N/a			Q	DNP	DNP	DNP	DNP	Q	DNP
Tour Challenge	—N/a						DNP	T2	QF	T2
The National	—N/a						DNP	DNP	Q	QF
Canadian Open	—N/a					DNP	DNP	QF	DNP	DNP
Players'	Q	DNP	DNP	DNP	DNP	DNP	DNP	DNP	DNP	DNP
Champions Cup	—N/a						Q	SF	DNP	DNP

=== Former events ===
Event	2010–11
Sobeys Slam	Q
