= Karen Trines =

Canadian curler

- Curler
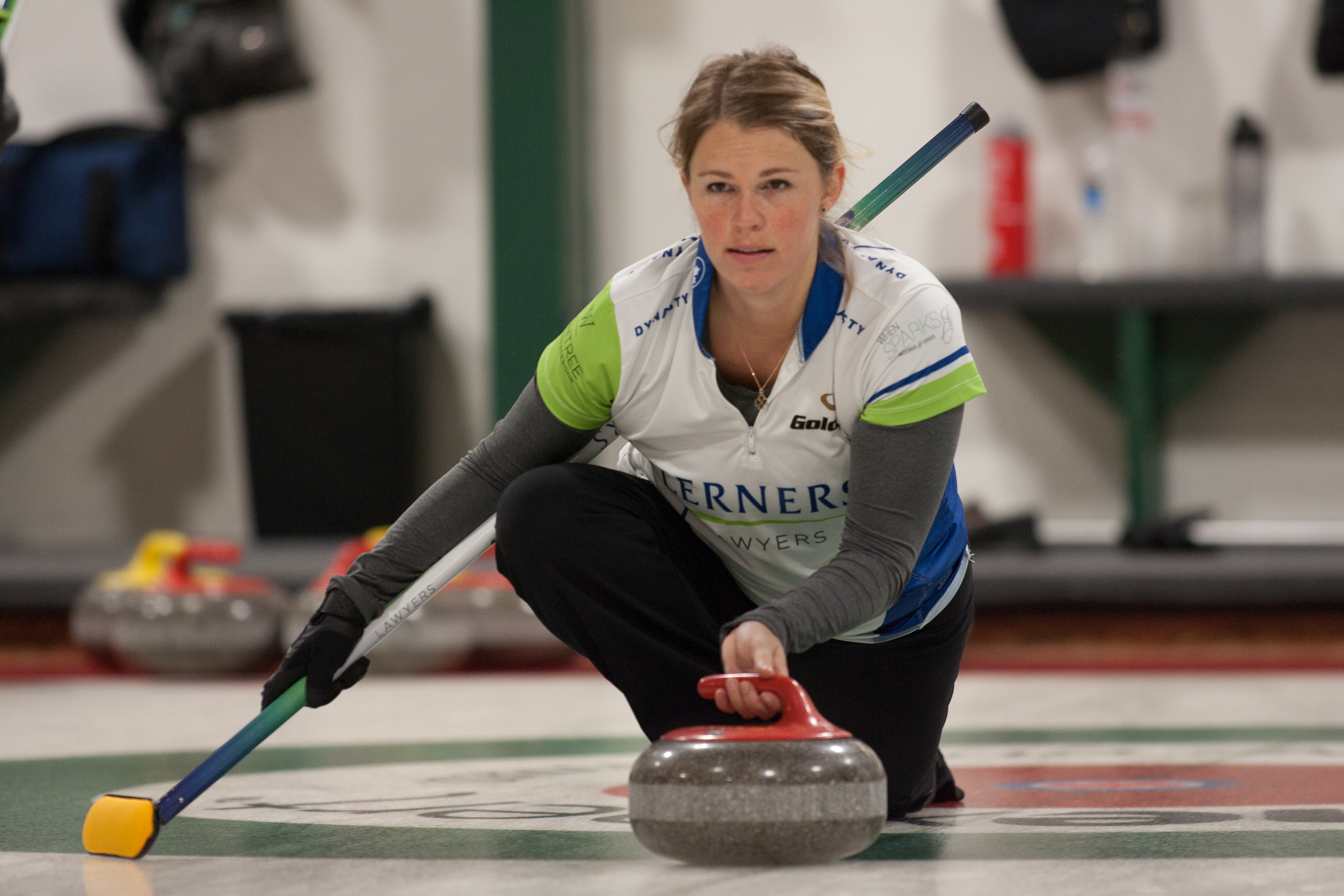
- Born: Karen Sagle; December 15, 1986 (age 39); Ottawa, Ontario, Canada

Team
- Curling club: Ottawa CC, Ottawa, ON

Curling career
- Member Association: Ontario
- Hearts: 2 (2016, 2018)
- Top CTRS ranking: 14th (2018–19)

Karen Trines (born December 15, 1986, in Ottawa as Karen Sagle) is a Canadian curler from Nepean, Ontario. She represented Ontario twice at the Scotties Tournament of Hearts and is not currently competing.

== Career ==
Trines twice represented Ontario at the Canadian Junior Curling Championships. The first time in 2005 with skip Erin Morrissey, and the second in 2007 with skip Hollie Nicol (now Duncan).

Sagle won a provincial mixed title in April 2015, playing lead for Mike McLean. The McLean rink went on to represent Ontario at the 2016 Canadian Mixed Curling Championship in Toronto, with Sagle playing lead.

In 2015, it was announced that Trines would be joining the Jenn Hanna rink. The team won the 2016 Ontario Scotties Tournament of Hearts, defeating the world's top-ranked Rachel Homan rink 10–8 in the provincial final, and represented Ontario at the 2016 Scotties Tournament of Hearts, where they finished with a 6–5 record. After the season, Trines joined the Hollie Duncan rink, a skip she had previously played for in juniors. Her new team won the 2018 Ontario Scotties Tournament of Hearts, defeating the previously undefeated Danielle Inglis rink 10–7 in the final, sending them to the 2018 Scotties Tournament of Hearts. There, they posted a 4–3 round robin record which qualified them for the tiebreaker against Newfoundland and Labrador's Stacie Curtis. Ontario scored three in the ninth end and stole two in the tenth for an 11–8 win and a spot in the Championship Pool, finishing the tournament with a 4–7 record.

== Personal life ==
Trines works as a Senior Program Analyst at Sport Canada and is an entrepreneur in the wedding industry. She is the owner of Grounded Ceremonies, co-founder of Ottawa Elopements, and founder and CEO of the Canadian School of Wedding Officiants. It is believed that she and former teammate Brit O'Neill were the first ever openly LGBT couple to compete at the Scotties Tournament of Hearts. She is married to Kat Trines, and together they have three children.
