= Brit O'Neill =

Canadian curler

- Curler
- Born: May 6, 1986 (age 40); Ancaster, Ontario, Canada

Curling career
- Member Association: Ontario
- Hearts: 1 (2016)

Brittani O'Neill (born May 6, 1986) is a Canadian curler from Ottawa, Ontario.

== Career ==
=== Juniors ===
In 2006, O'Neill skipped Brock University to an Ontario University Athletics championship. In 2007, O'Neill won the Ontario Junior Mixed title, playing third for the Scott McDonald rink.

=== Women's ===
O'Neill began her women's career skipping a rink on the World Curling Tour in 2007. She would later join the Chrissy Cadorin rink for the 2011-12 season, before forming her own rink again. She joined the Jenn Hanna team in 2015.

In 2015, O'Neil won the 2016 Ontario Mixed championship, throwing third rocks on a team consisting of Mike McLean, Andrew Denny and Karen Sagle. The team finished with a 6-3 record, winning the "Seeding pool", placing 9th overall. O'Neill found more success that season with the Hanna rink, qualifying for her first ever Ontario Scotties Tournament of Hearts. At the 2016 Ontario Scotties Tournament of Hearts, the Hanna rink beat the World #1 ranked Rachel Homan rink in the final, qualifying the team to represent Ontario at the 2016 Scotties Tournament of Hearts.

== Personal life ==
O'Neill is currently a dental hygiene student at Algonquin College. She was in a common-law relationship with her teammate, Karen Sagle.
