= Christine McCrady =

Canadian curler

Christine McCrady is a Canadian curler from Ottawa, Ontario. She curls out of the Rideau Curling Club.

McCrady is a former provincial champion. She won the 1995 provincial championship playing third for Alison Goring's rink from the Bayview Country Club in Thornhill, Ontario. This qualified the team to represent Ontario at the 1995 Scott Tournament of Hearts in Calgary, Canada's national women's curling championship. The team finished with a 7-4 round robin record, which was not good enough for the playoffs that year, and the team had finished in 5th place. McCrady herself had a 77% shooting percentage during the tournament.

McCrady would be on the Ontario team in two more Tournament of Hearts' as the alternate player. In the 1998 and 2000 championships she was the alternate for the teams skipped by Anne Merklinger. In both events, McCrady did not play any matches. The team lost in the finals in both events.

McCrady would later join the Merklinger team as a normal player, throwing third stones. They made the playoffs at the 2002 provincial championship.

McCrady would later join up with Darcie Walker as her third before forming her own team in 2005.

McCrady disappeared from the curling scene for five years before returning in 2010. She won her first World Curling Tour event at the 2010 Royal LePage OVCA Women's Fall Classic, defeating Tracy Horgan's rink in the final.
