= Lee Merklinger =

Canadian curler

- Curler
- Born: 16 September 1984 (age 42); Ottawa, Ontario, Canada

Team
- Curling club: Ottawa CC, Ottawa, ON

Curling career
- Member Association: Ontario
- Grand Slam victories: 1: Autumn Gold (2012)
Medal record
Curling
Representing Ontario
Canadian Olympic Curling Trials
Silver medal – second place	2013 Winnipeg

Lee Anne Merklinger (born September 16, 1984) is a Canadian female curler from Nepean, Ontario. Merklinger played second for the Sherry Middaugh rink on the World Curling Tour from 2010 to 2018. Among the team's accomplishments were finishing runners up at the 2013 Canadian Olympic Curling Trials and winning the 2012 Curlers Corner Autumn Gold Curling Classic Grand Slam event.

== Teams and events ==
Season	Skip	Third	Second	Lead	Alternate	Coach	Events
2000—01	Lee Merklinger						2001 OJCC (bronze)
2001—02	Lee Merklinger						2002 OJCC
2002—03	Lee Merklinger						2003 OJCC (silver)
2003—04	Lee Merklinger	Leslie Levere	Lisa Weagle	Breanne Merklinger			2004 OJCC (silver)
2004—05	Lee Merklinger	Leslie Levere	Lisa Weagle	Breanne Merklinger			
2005—06	Janet McGhee	Julie Reddick	Lee Merklinger	Lori Eddy			
2006—07	Janet McGhee	Pascale Letendre	Lee Merklinger	Breanne Merklinger			
2007—08	Jenn Hanna	Chrissy Cadorin	Stephanie Hanna	Lee Merklinger			
2008—09	Jenn Hanna	Stephanie Hanna	Lee Merklinger	Lisa Weagle			
2009—10	Jo-Ann Rizzo	Chrissy Cadorin	Lee Merklinger	Leigh Armstrong			
2010—11	Sherry Middaugh	Jo-Ann Rizzo	Lee Merklinger	Leigh Armstrong			
2011—12	Sherry Middaugh	Jo-Ann Rizzo	Lee Merklinger	Leigh Armstrong			2012 CCC (6th)
2012—13	Sherry Middaugh	Jo-Ann Rizzo	Lee Merklinger	Leigh Armstrong	Lori Eddy		
2013—14	Sherry Middaugh	Jo-Ann Rizzo	Lee Merklinger	Leigh Armstrong	Lori Eddy		COCT 2013 (silver)
2014—15	Sherry Middaugh	Jo-Ann Rizzo	Lee Merklinger	Leigh Armstrong	Lori Eddy		2014 CCC (6th)
2015—16	Sherry Middaugh	Jo-Ann Rizzo	Lee Merklinger	Leigh Armstrong	Lori Eddy		2015 CCC (4th)
2016—17	Sherry Middaugh	Jo-Ann Rizzo	Lee Merklinger	Leigh Armstrong	Kimberly Tuck		
2017—18	Krista McCarville	Kendra Lilly	Ashley Sippala	Sarah Potts	Lee Merklinger	Lorraine Lang	COCT 2017 (5th)
2017—18	Sherry Middaugh	Jo-Ann Rizzo	Lee Merklinger	Leigh Armstrong	Kimberly Tuck		

== Personal life ==
Merklinger is a member of a famous curling family. Her older brother Dave Merklinger is one of the leading Canadian and international icemakers. Her older half-sister Anne Merklinger is a former Tournament of Hearts champion (1990) and medallist and 1990 World Championship bronze medallist. Her twin sister Breanne Merklinger and brother Bill Merklinger are competitive curlers as well; Bill was the alternate for the Territories team at the 2015 Brier.

Outside of curling, Merklinger works for the Government of Canada, as Policy Analyst for Indigenous Services Canada. She is a member of the Muscowpetung First Nation.
