= Janet Murphy =

Canadian curler

- Curler
- Born: April 22, 1965 (age 61); Amherst, Nova Scotia

Team
- Curling club: Mississaugua Golf & Country Club; Mississauga, ON
- Skip: Jo-Ann Rizzo
- Third: Janet Murphy
- Second: Lori Eddy
- Lead: Mary Chilvers

Curling career
- Member Association: Ontario

Janet Murphy (born April 22, 1965) is a Canadian curler. She was born in Amherst, Nova Scotia but resides in Mississauga, Ontario. She is the director of curling at Mississaugua Golf & Country Club.

== Career ==
From 2010–2014, Murphy was the third on Cathy Auld's team. From 2014-2015 she was the third on Clancy Grandy's team.

From 2015–2018 she was third on Jacqueline Harrison's team. In 2015, the team won the Gord Carroll Curling Classic, Oakville Fall Classic and Royal LePage Women's Fall Classic. The following year, the team won the Brantford Nissan Classic.

She coached her daughter Jestyn Murphy who is also a curler. From 2018–2020 they both played on the same team with Janet being third and her daughter being the skip. The team went on to win the Listowel Women's Classic in 2018 and finished as runners-up the following year.

Murphy moved into the Senior ranks in 2022, joining the Jo-Ann Rizzo rink. The team won the Ontario Senior women's championship that year and again in 2024.

== Personal life ==
Her husband Hugh Murphy was also a curler and died in 2020. They had two children, Jestyn and Hale. Murphy works as the director of curling at the Mississaugua Golf & Country Club.
