= Kim Moore (curler) =

Canadian curler (born 1967)

Kimberly Ann Moore (born October 20, 1967, in Kirkland Lake, Ontario) is a Canadian curler from St. Catharines, Ontario.

In 1997, Moore played second for 1990 Tournament of Hearts champion Alison Goring. At the Hearts that year, the team lost in the final game to Sandra Schmirler. It was Moore's first Hearts appearance. Moore would later leave the Goring team, to skip her own team, and by 2006 she joined the Sherry Middaugh rink. Moore won her second provincial title in 2008, playing for Middaugh. Moore stopped curling competitively after the 2009-10 season.
