= Jenn Hanna =

Canadian curler

- Curler
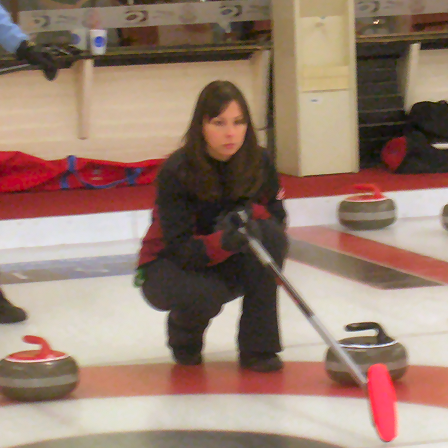
- Born: Jennifer Ann Hanna; January 22, 1980 (age 46); Ottawa, Ontario, Canada

Team
- Curling club: Ottawa CC; Ottawa, ON

Curling career
- Member Association: Ontario
- Hearts: 3 (2004, 2005, 2016)
- Top CTRS ranking: 9th (2004-05, 2005-06)
Medal record
Women's curling
Representing Ontario
Scotties Tournament of Hearts
Silver medal – second place	2005 St. John's

Jennifer Ann Hanna (born January 22, 1980) is a Canadian curler from Nepean, Ontario. She curls out of the Ottawa Curling Club. She was a finalist in both the 1998 Canadian Junior Curling Championship and the 2005 Scott Tournament of Hearts.

== Career ==
=== Early competitive career ===
Hanna competed at the 1998 Canadian Juniors, losing in the final to New Brunswick's Melissa McClure. Despite this, she was named as the tournament's second team all-star skip. In 2002, as a second for Anne Merklinger, Hanna finished second at the Ontario Championships. In 2003, as a vice-skip for Darcie Simpson, she finished second and at the 2004 Ontario Scott Tournament of Hearts, she finished third in her first year skipping, after finishing first in the round robin. She was invited by Sherry Middaugh, the 2004 Ontario champion, to be the team's "fifth player" at the 2004 Scott Tournament of Hearts. Hanna did not, however, play any games.

=== 2005 Provincials and Scott Tournament of Hearts ===
In the 2005 Ontario Women's Curling Championships, Hanna and her team, consisting of Pascale Letendre, Dawn Askin and her sister Stephanie Hanna, recovered from a 1-4 record in the round-robin to win eight straight games and clinch the Championships, earning the right to represent Ontario at the 2005 Scott Tournament of Hearts in St. John's, Newfoundland and Labrador.

At the 2005 Scotts, she caught the attention of many by winning the Ford Hot Shots competition and defeating defending champion Colleen Jones in the first draw. After falling to a record of 2-4, she rallied by winning four of her next five games, finishing 6-5. This was enough, however, to get into a four-way tie for fourth place. Hanna would end up winning both of her tie-breakers, against Cathy King of Alberta and Sandy Comeau of New Brunswick, allowing her to make the playoffs. She then proceeded to defeat Stefanie Lawton of Saskatchewan in the 3 vs. 4 game, followed by Kelly Scott of British Columbia in the semi-final, to face the Jennifer Jones rink from Manitoba in the final. At this stage, Hanna's team played well, and led for most of the game, but lost on the last rock to Jones' game saving in-off for four points. Hanna was named the tournament MVP, and was chosen for the second all-star team.

=== 2005–2015 ===
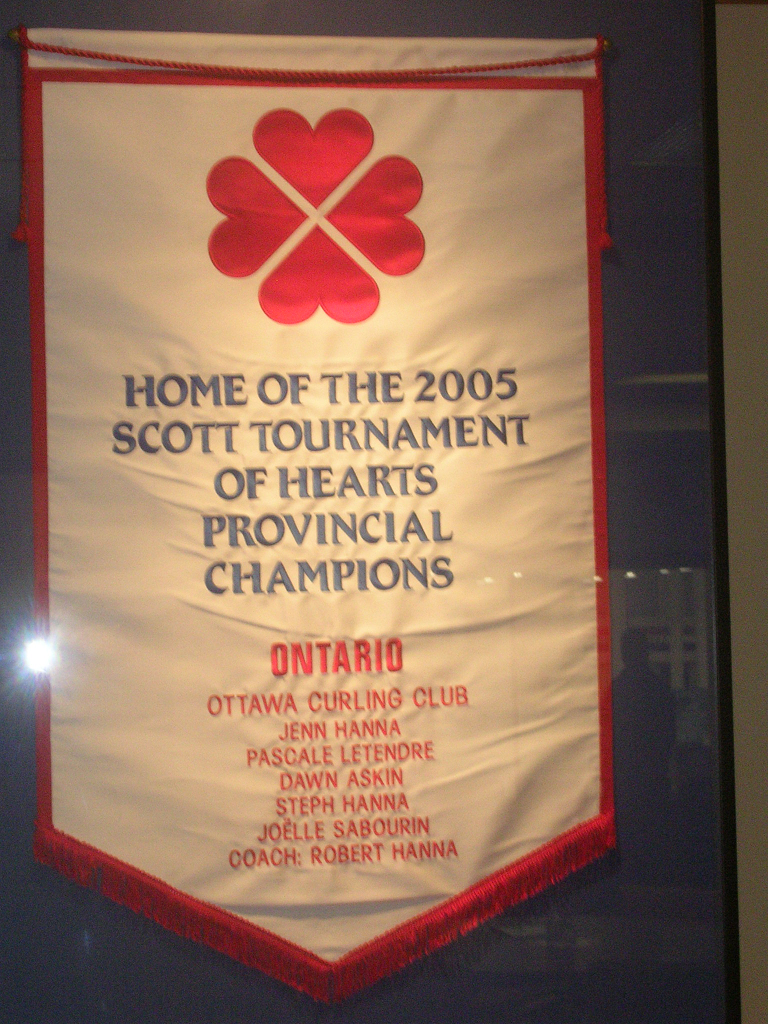
For her winning the 2005 Ontario Scott Tournament of Hearts, the Ottawa Curling Club was given this banner

In March 2005, Hanna announced that her team's spare player, Joëlle Sabourin, would replace Letendre as the team's third, producing the same lineup they had in 2003-2004. Letendre was supposed to be the new spare, but had decided to form her own team.

The new Hanna team started the 2005-06 season well, with their first ever Women's Tour victory, winning the Autumn Gold Classic in Calgary, Alberta on October 17, 2005. The total winnings for the team were $14,000. At the Ontario Scott Tournament of Hearts, however, Hanna's team lost in the quarter-final to two-time World Champion Marilyn Bodogh.

In February 2006, the team acquired a new player for the following season, Chrissy Cadorin of Guelph, Ontario. Cadorin, who had skipped her own team for a number of years would play third, while Sabourin would play second. Dawn Askin became the team's Alternate, citing her desire to focus on her new career.

The 2006-2007 season was not as successful as the previous two for the Hanna team. After not winning any major bonspiels, the team did have some success at the 2007 provincial championship. After finishing in first place after the round-robin, they lost both of their playoff games.

After the season, Sabourin left the team to play for Marie-France Larouche in Quebec. Alternate Dawn Askin moved to Winnipeg, Manitoba to play for Jennifer Jones. Sabourin was replaced by Lee Merklinger at lead.

Hanna played the 2007-2008 season while pregnant. Once again, the team qualified for the provincials, but lost in the tie-breaker match to Janet McGhee.

After the 2007-08 season, Cadorin left the team to form her own team. Steph Hanna was then promoted to third, and Merklinger to second, adding Lauren Mann as lead. Mann would be replaced by Lisa Weagle later on in the season. The team once again did not perform very well in the season's curling tour. However, they once again were able to make it to the provincial championship. The team, which was bounced from Regions, came through by winning the last chance Challenge Round, qualifying them for the 2009 Ontario Scotties Tournament of Hearts. At the 2009 Ontario Scotties, the team finished the round robin with a 5-4 record, and lost in their tie-breaker match to Alison Goring.

In 2009, Team Hanna shuffled once again. The team brought Toronto-area curler Kelly Cochrane in at third and Trish Scharf at lead. Sister Stephanie was bumped from third to second. The team made it provincials once again in 2010, but finished with their worst record, 4-5.

In March 2010, Hanna announced she and her sister would be taking the 2010-11 curling season off.

The Hanna rink returned for the 2011-12 season with Pascale Letendre returning as third. The team began the season with success, winning the 2011 Challenge Casino Lac Leamy. They also qualified for the 2012 Ontario Scotties Tournament of Hearts.

At the conclusion of the 2011-12 season Hanna announced she would not be curling competitively in the 2012-13 season, and had no immediate plans to curl competitively in the near or immediate future. Her sister Stephanie also left competitive curling. However, the Hanna sisters and Letendre teamed up with Lisa Paddle to curl in the 2013–14 curling season.

=== 2016 Scotties run ===
After taking another season off, Hanna returned to competitive curling for the 2015–16 curling season, this time with Letendre as the team's alternate, Brit O'Neill at third and Karen Sagle at the second. Hanna qualified for her first provincial championship in four years, by winning the B-side of the last chance East qualifier for the 2016 Ontario Scotties Tournament of Hearts. The team shocked the curling world by winning the event, having to defeat their club mates, the World #1 ranked Rachel Homan rink in the final. At the 2016 Scotties Tournament of Hearts, the rink would again post a 6-5 record, however this time it would not be enough to make the playoffs. On March 7, 2016, Hanna again announced she would be stepping back from the game, citing a desire to focus on her work and family.

=== Post 2016 Scotties-run ===
While Hanna is currently not curling competitively, she plays on a team in the Ottawa Curling Club's cash league with teammates Lee Merklinger (former second for Team Sherry Middaugh), Lynn Kreviazuk (second for Team Carly Howard) and David Mathers (second for Team Glenn Howard).

== Personal life ==
Hanna was born in Ottawa, Ontario, and began curling at age five. In September 2006, Hanna married Brian Rumas. They have three children She is employed by the Public Safety Canada and is a graduate of Katimavik Elementary School, Earl of March Secondary School, and the University of Ottawa.

== Statistics ==
Year	Team	Position	Event	Finish	Record	Pct. (Note: Round-robin only)
1994	Morris (Granite)	Lead	Ontario Bantam Mixed	2nd	5–1	
1995	Morris (Granite)	Lead	Ontario Bantam Mixed	1st	6–0	
1998	Hanna (OCC)	Skip	Ontario Juniors	1st	8–0	–
1998	Ontario (Hanna)	Skip	Canadian Juniors	2nd	10–3	74
1999	Hanna (OCC)	Skip	Ontario Juniors	2nd	7–2	–
2000	Hanna (OCC)	Skip	Ontario Juniors	2nd	6–4	–
2001	Hanna (OCC)	Skip	Ontario Juniors	?	2–5	–
2002	Merklinger (RCC)	Second	Ontario STOH	3rd	7–4	–
2003	Simpson (RCC)	Third	Ontario STOH	2nd	8–4	–
2004	Hanna (OCC)	Skip	Ontario STOH	3rd	8–3	–
2004 (Note: Did not play)	Ontario (Middaugh)	Fifth	2004 STOH	3rd	8–5	–
2005	Hanna (OCC)	Skip	Ontario STOH	1st	9–4	–
2005	Ontario (Hanna)	Skip	2005 STOH	2nd	11–6	80
2006	Hanna (OCC)	Skip	Ontario STOH	4th	6–4	–
2007	Hanna (OCC)	Skip	Ontario STOH	3rd	8–3	–
2008	Hanna (OCC)	Skip	Ontario STOH	5th	6–4	–
2009	Hanna (OCC)	Skip	Ontario STOH	5th	5–5	–
2010	Hanna (OCC)	Skip	Ontario STOH	7th	4–5	–
2012	Hanna (OCC)	Skip	Ontario STOH	9th	2–7	–
2016	Hanna (OCC)	Skip	Ontario STOH	1st	9–3	–
2016	Ontario (Hanna)	Skip	2016 STOH	6th	6–5	79
Scotties Tournament of Hearts Totals					17–11	80
