= Erin Morrissey =

Canadian curler

- Curler
- Born: March 28, 1985 (age 41); Ottawa, Ontario

Team
- Curling club: Ottawa CC, Ottawa, ON
- Skip: Cathy Auld
- Third: Erin Morrissey
- Second: Erica Hopson
- Lead: Kim Brown

Curling career
- Member Association: Ontario
- Top CTRS ranking: 20th (2014–15)

Erin Kathleen Morrissey (born March 28, 1985) is a Canadian curler from Ottawa, Ontario. She currently is a third on team Cathy Auld. She is a former provincial junior, university and mixed champion.

== Career ==
In 2005 Morrissey's Rideau Curling Club rink won the Provincial junior championships. At the 2005 Canadian Junior Curling Championships, the team did not fare well however, finishing third last with a 4–8 record.

Morrissey would then attend the University of Western Ontario. In 2009, she would win the OUA championship for Western.

In 2010, Morrissey won the 2011 provincial mixed title playing third for Chris Gardner. Later in the year, they finished 4th at the 2011 Canadian Mixed Curling Championship.

Morrissey played for the Chaffeys Locks, Ontario-based Lisa Farnell rink from 2009 to 2014. In 2015, Morrissey would skip a new team on the Ontario Curling Tour. The team qualified for the 2016 Ontario Scotties Tournament of Hearts, and finished in last place with a 2–7 record.
