= Stephanie Hanna =

Canadian curler

- Curler
- Born: July 31, 1982 (age 44); Ottawa, Ontario, Canada

Team
- Curling club: Ottawa CC, Ottawa, ON

Curling career
- Member Association: Ontario
- Hearts: 2 (2005, 2016)
- Top CTRS ranking: 9th (2004-05, 2005-06)
Medal record
Women's curling
Representing Ontario
Scotties Tournament of Hearts
Silver medal – second place	2005 St. John's

Stephanie Valerie Hanna (born July 31, 1982) is a Canadian curler from Stittsville, Ontario. She is the long-time teammate of her sister, Jenn Hanna.

== Career ==
Hanna won the provincial Bantam championship in 1999 playing second for Julie Reddick.

Hanna has played with her sister Jenn since the 2003–2004 season, when she played lead for the team, which included Dawn Askin and second and Joëlle Sabourin at third. In their first season, the team lost the semi-final at the 2004 Ontario Scott Tournament of Hearts.

In 2005, Pascale Letendre replaced Sabourin at the third position. The new team won the provincial title, and went on to lose the final of the 2005 Scott Tournament of Hearts.

After a number of lineup changes, Stephanie was promoted to the team's second position in 2007 and then to third in 2008. After the team skipped the 2010–11 season, Letendre (who left the team after the 2005 Hearts) was brought back to play third, and Stephanie was bumped to second position. During this period, the Hanna team would not return to the Tournament of Hearts.

At the end of the 2011–12 season, both Stephanie and her sister Jenn announced they would not curl competitively in the 2012–13 season, and had no intention of curling competitively in the near or immediate future. However, the Hanna sisters and Letendre teamed up with Lisa Paddle to curl in the 2013–14 curling season.

== Personal life ==
Hanna is a childcare supervisor at the Children's Place Childcare Centre. She is married to Patrick Danis and has two children.
