= Pascale Letendre =

Canadian curler

- Curler

Team
- Curling club: Ottawa CC, Ottawa, ON

Curling career
- Member Association: Ontario
- Hearts: 2 (2005, 2016)
- Top CTRS ranking: 9th (2004-05)
Medal record
Women's curling
Representing Ontario
Scotties Tournament of Hearts
Silver medal – second place	2005 St. John's

Pascale Letendre (born c. 1980 in Montreal, Quebec) is a Canadian curler from Orleans, Ontario.

== Career ==
Letendre is most notable for playing third for the Jenn Hanna rink that lost in the final of the 2005 Scott Tournament of Hearts. Letendre was a replacement player for the rink that season, filling in for Joelle Sabourin who played as the team's alternate due to work commitments. After the season, Letendre left the team and was replaced by Sabourin.

After leaving the Hanna rink, Letendre would form her own team. The following season she joined up with Janet McGhee for whom she played one season Letendre eventually joined back with Hanna for the 2011-12 curling season. Both Jenn and Stephanie Hanna announced they will not compete competitively in the 2012-13 season, or in the near or immediate future. However, the Hanna sisters and Letendre teamed up with Lisa Paddle to curl in the 2013–14 curling season.

== Personal life ==
Letendre is employed as a labour and delivery nurse at the Ottawa Hospital, General Campus. She has two children.
