= Chrissy Cadorin =

Canadian curler (born 1980)

- Curler
- Born: Christina Cadorin; October 19, 1980 (age 46); North York, Ontario

Team
- Curling club: The Thornhill Club, Thornhill, ON
- Skip: Breanna Rozon
- Third: Chrissy Cadorin
- Second: Celeste Gauthier
- Lead: Jillian Page
- Alternate: Stephanie Thompson
- Mixed doubles partner: Rob Ainsley

Curling career
- Member Association: Ontario
- Top CTRS ranking: 20th (2006–07)

Christina Belle-Marie Cadorin (born October 19, 1980) is a Canadian curler from Thornhill, Ontario. She currently plays third on Team Breanna Rozon.

== Curling career ==
Cadorin was born in North York, Ontario, the daughter of Peter and Sandra Cadorin. She began curling when she about 11 years old.

As a junior curler, Cadorin won two Junior Mixed junior mixed titles, in 1999 playing lead on a team skipped by John Morris and in 2001 playing third on a team skipped by Sean St. Amand.

In university, Cadorin was a member of the Laurier Golden Hawks curling team.

In 2006, Cadorin joined Team Jenn Hanna, playing third on the team. The team played in one Grand Slam event that season, Cardorin's first, the 2006 Trail Appliances Autumn Gold Curling Classic. The team missed the playoffs. Cadorin remained on the team for one more season before forming her own rink in 2008 with Colleen Madonia, Janet Murphy and Kate Hamer.

In the 2008-09 season, Cadorin's new team entered four Grand Slam events, the 2008 Trail Appliances Curling Classic, the 2008 Casinos of Winnipeg Classic, the Wayden Transportation Ladies Classic and the 2008 Sobeys Slam. The team missed the playoffs in all four events. They began the season with Madonia skipping the team, while Cadorin threw last stones, however Cadorin would eventually take over skipping duties.

For the 2009-10 season, Cadorin joined the Jo-Ann Rizzo team, playing third for the rink. Cadorin played in the 2009 Manitoba Lotteries Women's Curling Classic with the team, missing the playoffs. In 2010, Cadorin left the Rizzo rink to form her own team once again, and has been a skip ever since.

In December 2017, Cadorin won the Ontario Trophy Championship, in the first year it was a direct qualifier for the Ontario Scotties Tournament of Hearts.

In November 2022, Cadorin Skipped Team Ontario to a silver medal finish at The Everest Canadian Curling Club Championships, losing to New Brunswick in a battle. Her Ontario Club Team represented The Thornhill Club at the event held at the West Edmonton Mall.

== Personal life ==
Cadorin has a history degree from Wilfrid Laurier University. In 2006, she was working in a bar in Thornhill. She went back to school to complete her Masters in History, graduating in 2026.

She posed for the "provocative" Fire On Ice: 2007 Team Sponsorship calendar produced by Ana Arce in order to increase exposure and funding for women's curling. She posed again in the 2009 Women of Curling calendar.

Cadorin ran for Markham City Council in Ward 1 in the 2026 municipal election, losing to incumbent councillor Keith Irish by about 3,500 votes.
