= 2023 Stu Sells Tankard =

- Host city: Barrie, Ontario
- Arena: Barrie Curling Club
- Dates: October 5–9
- Men's winner: (Japan) Team Morozumi
- Curling club: Karuizawa CC, Karuizawa
- Skip: Yusuke Morozumi
- Third: Yuta Matsumura
- Second: Ryotaro Shukuya
- Lead: Masaki Iwai
- Alternate: Kosuke Morozumi
- Finalist: (South Korea) Jeong Byeong-jin
- Women's winner: (South Korea) Team Kim
- Curling club: Gangneung CC, Gangneung
- Skip: Kim Eun-jung
- Third: Kim Kyeong-ae
- Second: Kim Cho-hi
- Lead: Kim Seon-yeong
- Alternate: Kim Yeong-mi
- Coach: Lim Myung-sup, Peter Gallant
- Finalist: (Japan) Team Yoshimura

The 2023 Stu Sells Tankard was held from October 5 to 9 at the Barrie Curling Club in Barrie, Ontario. The event was held in a round-robin format with a purse of $30,000 on the men's side and $21,000 on the women's side. It was the second Stu Sells sponsored event held as part of the 2023–24 season.

In the men's final, Japan's Yusuke Morozumi led his team of Yuta Matsumura, Ryotaro Shukuya, Masaki Iwai and Kosuke Morozumi to a triumphant 8–2 victory over South Korea's Jeong Byeong-jin. Morozumi opened the game with a count of five in the opening end. Jeong replied with two in the second before the Japanese answered back with three in third to bring the game to an early close. The Morozumi rink finished 3–1 through the round robin and scored playoff wins over Marco Hösli and Mike Fournier to reach the final. Team Jeong also went 3–1 in the preliminary round before knocking off fellow Korean rivals Park Jong-duk in the quarterfinals and Owen Purcell in the semis. Sam Mooibroek and Jayden King also qualified for the final eight but lost in the quarters.

South Korea's Kim Eun-jung took the women's title, counting two in the eighth end to win 6–5 over Japan's Sayaka Yoshimura rink, led by Yuna Kotani, in the final. The 2018 Olympic silver medalists took control of the game with a deuce in the fourth end but a strong seventh by Yoshimura gave them a one point edge coming home. In the eighth, Kim narrowly got by the two guards on her final takeout attempt to count two and secure the team's first tour title of the season. The Korean team, with Eun-jung, Kim Kyeong-ae, Kim Cho-hi, Kim Seon-yeong and Kim Yeong-mi went 3–1 in the round robin before knocking off both Wang Rui and Han Yu of China in the quarters and semis respectively. Team Yoshimura also went 3–1 and then beat Susan Froud and Lauren Mann. Ikue Kitazawa and Krysta Burns rounded out the playoff field.

== Men ==
=== Teams ===
The teams are listed as follows:

Skip	Third	Second	Lead	Alternate	Locale
Julien Tremblay (Fourth)	Jean-Michel Arsenault (Skip)	Jesse Mullen	Philippe Brassard		Lévis, Quebec
Carter Bryant	Nolan Bryant	Jacob Clarke	Matthew Abrams		Brantford, Ontario
Daniel Casper	Luc Violette	Ben Richardson	Chase Sinnett		(United States) Chaska, Minnesota
Alex Champ	Charlie Richard	Austin Snyder	Scott Clinton	Jess Bechard	Toronto, Ontario
Scott Dunnam	Cody Clouser	Lance Wheeler	Andrew Dunnam		(United States) Philadelphia, Pennsylvania
John Epping	Aaron Squires (Note: Aaron Squires spared for Mat Camm.)	Pat Janssen	Jason Camm		Toronto, Ontario
Travis Fanset	Brandon Tippin	Mike Walsh	Chad Allen		Brantford, Ontario
Pat Ferris	Landan Rooney	Connor Duhaime	Robert Currie	Evan Lilly	Grimsby, Ontario
Mike Fournier	Kevin Flewwelling	Sean Harrison	Zander Elmes		Toronto, Ontario
Marco Hösli	Philipp Hösli	Simon Gloor	Justin Hausherr		Glarus, Switzerland
Tanner Horgan	Jacob Horgan	Ian McMillan	Scott Chadwick	Joey Hart	Sudbury, Ontario
Glenn Howard	Scott Howard	David Mathers	Tim March		Penetanguishene, Ontario
Jeong Byeong-jin	Kim Min-woo	Lee Jeong-jae	Kim Tae-hwan		Seoul, South Korea
Jayden King	Dylan Niepage	Gavin Lydiate	Daniel Del Conte		Guelph, Ontario
Rylan Kleiter	Joshua Mattern	Matthew Hall	Trevor Johnson		Saskatoon, Saskatchewan
Matthew Manuel	Luke Saunders	Jeffrey Meagher	Nick Zachernuk		Halifax, Nova Scotia
Sam Mooibroek	Scott Mitchell	Nathan Steele	Colin Schnurr	Wyatt Small	Whitby, Ontario
Yusuke Morozumi	Yuta Matsumura	Ryotaro Shukuya	Masaki Iwai	Kosuke Morozumi	Karuizawa, Japan
Park Jong-duk	Jeong Yeong-seok	Oh Seung-hoon	Seong Ji-hoon	Lee Ki-bok	Gangwon, South Korea
Owen Purcell	Ryan Abraham	Scott Saccary	Adam McEachren		Halifax, Nova Scotia
Rich Ruohonen	Jason Smith	Samuel Strouse	Jared Allen	Aidan Oldenburg	(United States) Minneapolis, Minnesota
Andrin Schnider	Dean Hürlimann	Marco Hefti	Nicola Stoll		Schaffhausen, Switzerland
John Shuster	Chris Plys	Matt Hamilton	John Landsteiner	Colin Hufman	(United States) Duluth, Minnesota
Stuart Thompson	Cameron MacKenzie	Travis Colter	Phil Crowell		Halifax, Nova Scotia

=== Round robin standings ===
Final Round Robin Standings

Key
Teams to Playoffs
Teams to Tiebreakers

Pool A	W	L	PF	PA
(South Korea) Park Jong-duk	3	1	24	17
(Ontario) Mike Fournier	3	1	26	18
(Ontario) Tanner Horgan	2	2	22	19
(United States) John Shuster	2	2	21	20
(Saskatchewan) Rylan Kleiter	2	2	20	21
(Ontario) Carter Bryant	0	4	11	29

Pool B	W	L	PF	PA
(Switzerland) Marco Hösli	3	1	25	19
(South Korea) Jeong Byeong-jin	3	1	17	13
(Ontario) Pat Ferris	3	1	22	21
(Nova Scotia) Matthew Manuel	2	2	20	18
(United States) Scott Dunnam	1	3	19	24
(Ontario) Travis Fanset	0	4	16	24

Pool C	W	L	PF	PA
(Ontario) Sam Mooibroek	4	0	32	6
(Nova Scotia) Owen Purcell	3	1	27	19
(Ontario) John Epping	2	2	16	20
(Quebec) Jean-Michel Arsenault	2	2	27	24
(United States) Rich Ruohonen	1	3	11	26
(Switzerland) Andrin Schnider	0	4	13	31

Pool D	W	L	PF	PA
(Ontario) Jayden King	4	0	27	16
(Japan) Yusuke Morozumi	3	1	29	15
(United States) Daniel Casper	3	1	21	14
(Nova Scotia) Stuart Thompson	1	3	12	24
(Ontario) Glenn Howard	1	3	17	20
(Ontario) Alex Champ	0	4	12	29

=== Round robin results ===
All draw times are listed in Eastern Time (UTC−04:00).

==== Draw 1 ====
Thursday, October 5, 3:00 pm

Sheet 4	1	2	3	4	5	6	7	8	Final
(United States) John Shuster 🔨	1	0	2	0	3	1	X	X	7
(South Korea) Park Jong-duk	0	1	0	1	0	0	X	X	2

Sheet 5	1	2	3	4	5	6	7	8	Final
(Switzerland) Marco Hösli 🔨	1	3	1	0	0	2	0	1	8
(United States) Scott Dunnam	0	0	0	1	2	0	2	0	5

Sheet 6	1	2	3	4	5	6	7	8	Final
(Ontario) John Epping	2	0	1	0	2	3	X	X	8
(Switzerland) Andrin Schnider 🔨	0	0	0	2	0	0	X	X	2

Sheet 7	1	2	3	4	5	6	7	8	Final
(United States) Daniel Casper 🔨	0	0	1	0	X	X	X	X	1
(Japan) Yusuke Morozumi	1	3	0	3	X	X	X	X	7

==== Draw 2 ====
Thursday, October 5, 6:00 pm

Sheet 5	1	2	3	4	5	6	7	8	Final
(Saskatchewan) Rylan Kleiter	0	1	1	0	1	0	0	X	3
(Ontario) Mike Fournier 🔨	3	0	0	2	0	0	3	X	8

Sheet 6	1	2	3	4	5	6	7	8	Final
(South Korea) Jeong Byeong-jin 🔨	1	0	1	0	0	1	1	1	5
(Ontario) Pat Ferris	0	1	0	1	0	0	0	0	2

Sheet 7	1	2	3	4	5	6	7	8	Final
(Ontario) Sam Mooibroek 🔨	5	2	2	X	X	X	X	X	9
(United States) Rich Ruohonen	0	0	0	X	X	X	X	X	0

==== Draw 3 ====
Thursday, October 5, 9:00 pm

Sheet 4	1	2	3	4	5	6	7	8	Final
(Ontario) Tanner Horgan	0	2	3	0	0	2	X	X	7
(Ontario) Carter Bryant 🔨	1	0	0	1	0	0	X	X	2

Sheet 5	1	2	3	4	5	6	7	8	Final
(Ontario) Glenn Howard	0	0	3	0	0	1	0	1	5
(Nova Scotia) Stuart Thompson 🔨	1	1	0	1	0	0	0	0	3

==== Draw 4 ====
Friday, October 6, 8:00 am

Sheet 2	1	2	3	4	5	6	7	8	Final
(United States) John Shuster 🔨	0	3	0	1	0	1	0	2	7
(Saskatchewan) Rylan Kleiter	2	0	1	0	0	0	1	0	4

Sheet 3	1	2	3	4	5	6	7	8	Final
(Switzerland) Marco Hösli	0	1	0	1	2	0	2	0	6
(Ontario) Pat Ferris 🔨	2	0	2	0	0	3	0	1	8

Sheet 4	1	2	3	4	5	6	7	8	Final
(Ontario) John Epping	0	0	0	0	0	X	X	X	0
(Ontario) Sam Mooibroek 🔨	3	1	1	1	1	X	X	X	7

==== Draw 5 ====
Friday, October 6, 10:45 am

Sheet 4	1	2	3	4	5	6	7	8	Final
(Nova Scotia) Matthew Manuel 🔨	1	1	0	1	1	0	3	X	7
(Ontario) Travis Fanset	0	0	1	0	0	1	0	X	2

Sheet 5	1	2	3	4	5	6	7	8	Final
(Ontario) Alex Champ 🔨	2	0	1	0	0	0	1	X	4
(Ontario) Jayden King	0	2	0	2	2	2	0	X	8

==== Draw 6 ====
Friday, October 6, 2:15 pm

Sheet 5	1	2	3	4	5	6	7	8	9	Final
(Nova Scotia) Owen Purcell 🔨	2	0	2	0	2	0	1	0	1	8
(Quebec) Jean-Michel Arsenault	0	3	0	1	0	2	0	1	0	7

Sheet 6	1	2	3	4	5	6	7	8	9	Final
(Japan) Yusuke Morozumi 🔨	1	1	1	0	1	0	2	0	1	7
(Ontario) Glenn Howard	0	0	0	3	0	1	0	2	0	6

Sheet 7	1	2	3	4	5	6	7	8	Final
(Ontario) Mike Fournier 🔨	0	0	3	0	2	2	0	X	7
(Ontario) Carter Bryant	1	0	0	1	0	0	3	X	5

==== Draw 7 ====
Friday, October 6, 4:45 pm

Sheet 3	1	2	3	4	5	6	7	8	Final
(United States) Daniel Casper	0	3	1	1	3	X	X	X	8
(Nova Scotia) Stuart Thompson 🔨	1	0	0	0	0	X	X	X	1

Sheet 4	1	2	3	4	5	6	7	8	Final
(South Korea) Jeong Byeong-jin	0	2	2	0	1	0	1	0	6
(United States) Scott Dunnam 🔨	1	0	0	1	0	2	0	1	5

==== Draw 8 ====
Friday, October 6, 7:15 pm

Sheet 5	1	2	3	4	5	6	7	8	Final
(Switzerland) Andrin Schnider	0	0	1	2	0	1	0	X	4
(United States) Rich Ruohonen 🔨	1	1	0	0	2	0	2	X	6

Sheet 6	1	2	3	4	5	6	7	8	Final
(Switzerland) Marco Hösli	0	1	1	1	2	0	1	2	8
(Nova Scotia) Matthew Manuel 🔨	4	0	0	0	0	0	0	0	4

Sheet 7	1	2	3	4	5	6	7	8	Final
(Ontario) Tanner Horgan	0	0	1	0	0	X	X	X	1
(South Korea) Park Jong-duk 🔨	3	2	0	2	0	X	X	X	7

==== Draw 9 ====
Friday, October 6, 9:30 pm

Sheet 3	1	2	3	4	5	6	7	8	9	Final
(United States) Scott Dunnam 🔨	0	2	0	2	0	2	0	0	1	7
(Ontario) Travis Fanset	1	0	1	0	2	0	2	0	0	6

Sheet 4	1	2	3	4	5	6	7	8	Final
(Japan) Yusuke Morozumi 🔨	1	0	0	0	2	0	2	1	6
(Ontario) Jayden King	0	3	1	1	0	2	0	0	7

==== Draw 10 ====
Saturday, October 7, 8:00 am

Sheet 2	1	2	3	4	5	6	7	8	Final
(United States) Daniel Casper 🔨	2	0	3	0	1	0	1	X	7
(Ontario) Alex Champ	0	2	0	0	0	1	0	X	3

Sheet 3	1	2	3	4	5	6	7	8	Final
(Switzerland) Andrin Schnider	2	1	0	1	0	2	0	0	6
(Quebec) Jean-Michel Arsenault 🔨	0	0	3	0	2	0	4	1	10

==== Draw 11 ====
Saturday, October 7, 10:45 am

Sheet 2	1	2	3	4	5	6	7	8	Final
(South Korea) Jeong Byeong-jin 🔨	0	1	0	0	0	2	0	1	4
(Ontario) Travis Fanset	0	0	0	2	0	0	1	0	3

Sheet 3	1	2	3	4	5	6	7	8	Final
(Ontario) John Epping 🔨	0	0	1	0	0	1	0	X	2
(Nova Scotia) Owen Purcell	1	1	0	1	1	0	2	X	6

==== Draw 12 ====
Saturday, October 7, 2:15 pm

Sheet 2	1	2	3	4	5	6	7	8	Final
(Ontario) Glenn Howard 🔨	0	0	1	0	1	0	1	0	3
(Ontario) Jayden King	1	0	0	2	0	1	0	1	5

Sheet 3	1	2	3	4	5	6	7	8	Final
(United States) John Shuster	0	1	0	0	1	0	1	0	3
(Ontario) Mike Fournier 🔨	1	0	1	1	0	1	0	1	5

Sheet 5	1	2	3	4	5	6	7	8	Final
(Ontario) Pat Ferris	2	0	1	1	1	1	0	0	6
(Nova Scotia) Matthew Manuel 🔨	0	2	0	0	0	0	2	1	5

==== Draw 13 ====
Saturday, October 7, 4:45 pm

Sheet 2	1	2	3	4	5	6	7	8	Final
(Ontario) Sam Mooibroek	1	2	0	0	2	2	X	X	7
(Switzerland) Andrin Schnider 🔨	0	0	1	0	0	0	X	X	1

Sheet 3	1	2	3	4	5	6	7	8	9	Final
(Saskatchewan) Rylan Kleiter	0	0	2	2	0	0	1	0	1	6
(Ontario) Tanner Horgan 🔨	1	0	0	0	2	0	0	2	0	5

Sheet 4	1	2	3	4	5	6	7	8	Final
(Switzerland) Marco Hösli 🔨	0	1	0	0	0	1	0	1	3
(South Korea) Jeong Byeong-jin	0	0	0	0	1	0	1	0	2

==== Draw 14 ====
Saturday, October 7, 7:15 pm

Sheet 1	1	2	3	4	5	6	7	8	Final
(Nova Scotia) Owen Purcell	1	0	3	1	1	1	1	X	8
(United States) Rich Ruohonen 🔨	0	1	0	0	0	0	0	X	1

Sheet 3	1	2	3	4	5	6	7	8	Final
(South Korea) Park Jong-duk	1	3	0	3	0	1	X	X	8
(Ontario) Carter Bryant 🔨	0	0	1	0	2	0	X	X	3

Sheet 7	1	2	3	4	5	6	7	8	Final
(Japan) Yusuke Morozumi 🔨	0	2	0	2	5	X	X	X	9
(Ontario) Alex Champ	0	0	1	0	0	X	X	X	1

==== Draw 15 ====
Saturday, October 7, 9:30 pm

Sheet 1	1	2	3	4	5	6	7	8	Final
(Nova Scotia) Stuart Thompson	0	0	2	0	0	1	0	X	3
(Ontario) Jayden King 🔨	0	2	0	2	2	0	1	X	7

Sheet 5	1	2	3	4	5	6	7	8	Final
(Ontario) John Epping	0	2	0	0	1	0	2	1	6
(Quebec) Jean-Michel Arsenault 🔨	1	0	2	0	0	2	0	0	5

Sheet 6	1	2	3	4	5	6	7	8	Final
(United States) Scott Dunnam 🔨	0	0	1	1	0	0	0	0	2
(Nova Scotia) Matthew Manuel	1	0	0	0	0	1	1	1	4

==== Draw 16 ====
Sunday, October 8, 8:00 am

Sheet 4	1	2	3	4	5	6	7	8	Final
(Ontario) Pat Ferris	1	1	0	1	0	3	0	0	6
(Ontario) Travis Fanset 🔨	0	0	3	0	1	0	1	0	5

Sheet 5	1	2	3	4	5	6	7	8	Final
(United States) John Shuster	0	2	0	0	2	0	0	X	4
(Ontario) Tanner Horgan 🔨	2	0	0	1	0	5	1	X	9

==== Draw 17 ====
Sunday, October 8, 10:45 am

Sheet 3	1	2	3	4	5	6	7	8	Final
(United States) Daniel Casper 🔨	1	1	0	1	0	2	0	X	5
(Ontario) Glenn Howard	0	0	1	0	1	0	1	X	3

Sheet 6	1	2	3	4	5	6	7	8	Final
(Ontario) Sam Mooibroek 🔨	0	2	0	3	0	0	2	2	9
(Nova Scotia) Owen Purcell	1	0	1	0	1	2	0	0	5

==== Draw 18 ====
Sunday, October 8, 2:15 pm

Sheet 4	1	2	3	4	5	6	7	8	Final
(Saskatchewan) Rylan Kleiter 🔨	1	2	4	0	X	X	X	X	7
(Ontario) Carter Bryant	0	0	0	1	X	X	X	X	1

Sheet 5	1	2	3	4	5	6	7	8	Final
(Ontario) Alex Champ 🔨	0	2	0	1	0	0	1	0	4
(Nova Scotia) Stuart Thompson	2	0	1	0	0	1	0	1	5

==== Draw 19 ====
Sunday, October 8, 4:45 pm

Sheet 3	1	2	3	4	5	6	7	8	Final
(Quebec) Jean-Michel Arsenault 🔨	1	0	1	0	0	1	1	1	5
(United States) Rich Ruohonen	0	2	0	1	1	0	0	0	4

Sheet 4	1	2	3	4	5	6	7	8	9	Final
(Ontario) Mike Fournier 🔨	3	0	1	1	0	0	1	0	0	6
(South Korea) Park Jong-duk	0	1	0	0	2	1	0	2	1	7

=== Tiebreaker ===
Sunday, October 8, 9:30 pm

Sheet 5	1	2	3	4	5	6	7	8	Final
(South Korea) Jeong Byeong-jin	2	0	0	6	X	X	X	X	8
(Ontario) Pat Ferris 🔨	0	0	1	0	X	X	X	X	1

=== Playoffs ===
Quarterfinals
1	(Ontario) Sam Mooibroek	5
8	(Nova Scotia) Owen Purcell	6
4	(South Korea) Park Jong-duk	3
5	(South Korea) Jeong Byeong-jin	6
3	(Switzerland) Marco Hösli	4
6	(Japan) Yusuke Morozumi	5
2	(Ontario) Jayden King	5
7	(Ontario) Mike Fournier	6

Semifinals
8	(Nova Scotia) Owen Purcell	6
5	(South Korea) Jeong Byeong-jin	7
6	(Japan) Yusuke Morozumi	7
7	(Ontario) Mike Fournier	1

Final
5	(South Korea) Jeong Byeong-jin	2
6	(Japan) Yusuke Morozumi	8

==== Quarterfinals ====
Monday, October 9, 11:00 am

Sheet 1	1	2	3	4	5	6	7	8	9	Final
(Ontario) Jayden King	2	0	0	1	0	1	0	1	0	5
(Ontario) Mike Fournier 🔨	0	2	0	0	1	0	2	0	1	6

Sheet 2	1	2	3	4	5	6	7	8	Final
(Switzerland) Marco Hösli	0	0	1	0	2	0	1	0	4
(Japan) Yusuke Morozumi 🔨	0	1	0	2	0	1	0	1	5

Sheet 3	1	2	3	4	5	6	7	8	Final
(South Korea) Park Jong-duk	0	1	0	0	2	0	0	X	3
(South Korea) Jeong Byeong-jin 🔨	3	0	0	1	0	1	1	X	6

Sheet 4	1	2	3	4	5	6	7	8	Final
(Ontario) Sam Mooibroek	2	0	1	0	0	0	2	0	5
(Nova Scotia) Owen Purcell 🔨	0	2	0	0	0	2	0	2	6

==== Semifinals ====
Monday, October 9, 2:00 pm

Sheet 6	1	2	3	4	5	6	7	8	Final
(Nova Scotia) Owen Purcell	0	2	1	0	0	1	0	2	6
(South Korea) Jeong Byeong-jin 🔨	2	0	0	2	1	0	2	0	7

Sheet 7	1	2	3	4	5	6	7	8	Final
(Japan) Yusuke Morozumi 🔨	3	0	0	4	X	X	X	X	7
(Ontario) Mike Fournier	0	1	0	0	X	X	X	X	1

==== Final ====
Monday, October 9, 5:00 pm

Sheet 3	1	2	3	4	5	6	7	8	Final
(South Korea) Jeong Byeong-jin	0	2	0	X	X	X	X	X	2
(Japan) Yusuke Morozumi 🔨	5	0	3	X	X	X	X	X	8

== Women ==
=== Teams ===
The teams are listed as follows:

Skip	Third	Second	Lead	Alternate	Locale
Hailey Armstrong	Jessica Humphries	Michaela Robert	Terri Weeks	Grace Cave	Ottawa, Ontario
Courtney Auld	Chrissy Cadorin	Cayla Auld	Melanie Ebach	Leigh Armstrong	Thornhill, Ontario
Sarah Bailey	Katie Ford	Madison Fisher	Emily Middaugh		St. Catharines, Ontario
Paige Bown	Meaghan Mallett	Jessica Byers	Celeste Gauthier		Navan, Ontario
Chelsea Brandwood	Megan Smith	Brenda Chapman	Keira McLaughlin		Niagara Falls, Ontario
Krysta Burns	Jestyn Murphy	Sara Guy	Laura Masters		Sudbury, Ontario
Stacie Curtis	Erica Curtis	Julie Hynes	Camille Burt		St. John's, Newfoundland and Labrador
Jessica Daigle	Mary Myketyn-Driscoll	Marlee Powers	Lindsey Burgess		Halifax, Nova Scotia
Hollie Duncan	Megan Balsdon	Rachelle Strybosch	Tess Guyatt		Woodstock, Ontario
Susan Froud	Kerry Lackie	Kristin Turcotte	Julie McMullin		Alliston, Ontario
Han Yu	Wang Meini	Tian Linyuan	Yu Jiaxin		Beijing, China
Shelley Hardy	Stephanie Mumford	Jessica Corrado	Stephanie Corrado		Sarnia, Ontario
Fay Henderson	Hailey Duff	Amy MacDonald	Katie McMillan		Stirling, Scotland
Corrie Hürlimann	Celine Schwizgebel	Sarah Müller	Marina Lörtscher	Briar Schwaller-Hürlimann	Zug, Switzerland
Kaitlin Jewer	Breanna Rozon	Kristina Brauch	Audrey de Sousa		Peterborough, Ontario
Kim Eun-jung	Kim Kyeong-ae	Kim Cho-hi	Kim Seon-yeong	Kim Yeong-mi	Gangneung, South Korea
Ikue Kitazawa	Seina Nakajima	Ami Enami	Minori Suzuki	Hasumi Ishigooka	Nagano, Japan
Lauren Mann	Stephanie Barbeau	Abby Deschene	Candice Jackson		Timmins, Ontario
Krista McCarville	Andrea Kelly	Kendra Lilly	Ashley Sippala	Sarah Potts	Thunder Bay, Ontario
Quinn Walsh	Brooke Davies	Mackenzie Cryderman	Melissa Retz		Oshawa, Ontario
Wang Rui	Guo Yanan	Dong Ziqi	Yang Ying		Beijing, China
Katelyn Wasylkiw	Lauren Wasylkiw	Stephanie Thompson	Alice Holyoke		Milton, Ontario
Yuna Kotani (Note: As skip Sayaka Yoshimura was on maternity leave, the rest of the team moved up the lineup a position.)	Kaho Onodera	Anna Ohmiya	Mina Kobayashi		Sapporo, Japan
Tori Zemmelink	Emma Artichuk	Lauren Rajala	Katie Shaw		Guelph, Ontario

=== Round robin standings ===
Final Round Robin Standings

Key
Teams to Playoffs
Teams to Tiebreakers

Pool A	W	L	PF	PA
(Ontario) Krysta Burns	4	0	28	10
(Ontario) Lauren Mann	3	1	25	22
(Switzerland) Corrie Hürlimann	2	2	25	19
(Ontario) Shelley Hardy	2	2	22	16
(Ontario) Tori Zemmelink	1	3	17	25
(Ontario) Quinn Walsh	0	4	7	32

Pool B	W	L	PF	PA
(Japan) Ikue Kitazawa	4	0	27	10
(China) Han Yu	2	2	19	18
(Newfoundland and Labrador) Stacie Curtis	2	2	22	20
(Ontario) Hailey Armstrong	2	2	19	22
(Ontario) Sarah Bailey	1	3	18	26
(Nova Scotia) Jessica Daigle	1	3	19	28

Pool C	W	L	PF	PA
(China) Wang Rui	3	1	23	20
(South Korea) Kim Eun-jung	3	1	26	17
(Ontario) Chelsea Brandwood	2	2	23	18
(Ontario) Hollie Duncan	2	2	23	19
(Ontario) Paige Bown	1	3	13	26
(Ontario) Katelyn Wasylkiw	1	3	22	30

Pool D	W	L	PF	PA
(Ontario) Susan Froud	3	1	20	15
(Japan) Team Yoshimura	3	1	20	17
(Ontario) Krista McCarville	2	2	17	13
(Ontario) Courtney Auld	2	2	17	13
(Scotland) Fay Henderson	2	2	18	19
(Ontario) Kaitlin Jewer	0	4	9	24

=== Round robin results ===
All draw times are listed in Eastern Time (UTC−04:00).

==== Draw 1 ====
Thursday, October 5, 3:00 pm

Sheet 1	1	2	3	4	5	6	7	8	Final
(Switzerland) Corrie Hürlimann	0	1	0	0	0	1	0	X	2
(Ontario) Krysta Burns 🔨	1	0	2	1	1	0	2	X	7

Sheet 2	1	2	3	4	5	6	7	8	Final
(Japan) Ikue Kitazawa 🔨	2	0	2	0	0	1	0	1	6
(Newfoundland and Labrador) Stacie Curtis	0	1	0	1	0	0	1	0	3

Sheet 3	1	2	3	4	5	6	7	8	Final
(Japan) Team Yoshimura 🔨	0	3	0	2	0	1	1	1	8
(Scotland) Fay Henderson	1	0	3	0	2	0	0	0	6

==== Draw 2 ====
Thursday, October 5, 6:00 pm

Sheet 1	1	2	3	4	5	6	7	8	Final
(Ontario) Shelley Hardy	1	2	1	1	2	X	X	X	7
(Ontario) Quinn Walsh 🔨	0	0	0	0	0	X	X	X	0

Sheet 2	1	2	3	4	5	6	7	8	9	Final
(Ontario) Hailey Armstrong	0	2	0	1	1	0	0	0	1	5
(China) Han Yu 🔨	0	0	1	0	0	1	1	1	0	4

Sheet 3	1	2	3	4	5	6	7	8	Final
(South Korea) Kim Eun-jung	0	2	0	0	0	2	0	X	4
(Ontario) Chelsea Brandwood 🔨	0	0	1	1	0	0	1	X	3

==== Draw 3 ====
Thursday, October 5, 9:00 pm

Sheet 1	1	2	3	4	5	6	7	8	Final
(Ontario) Katelyn Wasylkiw 🔨	1	0	0	1	2	0	1	0	5
(Ontario) Paige Bown	0	2	1	0	0	2	0	3	8

Sheet 2	1	2	3	4	5	6	7	8	Final
(Ontario) Hollie Duncan 🔨	3	0	0	2	0	1	1	X	7
(China) Wang Rui	0	1	0	0	1	0	0	X	2

Sheet 3	1	2	3	4	5	6	7	8	Final
(Ontario) Krista McCarville 🔨	0	1	0	0	1	0	0	0	2
(Ontario) Susan Froud	1	0	0	0	0	0	2	1	4

Sheet 7	1	2	3	4	5	6	7	8	Final
(Ontario) Kaitlin Jewer 🔨	0	1	0	0	0	0	X	X	1
(Ontario) Courtney Auld	0	0	0	2	3	1	X	X	6

==== Draw 4 ====
Friday, October 6, 8:00 am

Sheet 5	1	2	3	4	5	6	7	8	Final
(Nova Scotia) Jessica Daigle 🔨	0	0	3	0	2	0	1	0	6
(Ontario) Sarah Bailey	1	1	0	3	0	1	0	2	8

==== Draw 5 ====
Friday, October 6, 10:45 am

Sheet 1	1	2	3	4	5	6	7	8	Final
(Ontario) Tori Zemmelink 🔨	2	0	0	1	0	0	0	X	3
(Ontario) Lauren Mann	0	2	2	0	1	1	2	X	8

Sheet 2	1	2	3	4	5	6	7	8	Final
(Japan) Team Yoshimura	2	1	0	1	0	1	1	X	6
(Ontario) Kaitlin Jewer 🔨	0	0	1	0	1	0	0	X	2

Sheet 3	1	2	3	4	5	6	7	8	Final
(Japan) Ikue Kitazawa 🔨	2	3	0	3	X	X	X	X	8
(Ontario) Hailey Armstrong	0	0	1	0	X	X	X	X	1

==== Draw 6 ====
Friday, October 6, 2:15 pm

Sheet 3	1	2	3	4	5	6	7	8	Final
(Switzerland) Corrie Hürlimann 🔨	0	0	3	0	2	1	2	X	8
(Ontario) Shelley Hardy	1	0	0	1	0	0	0	X	2

Sheet 4	1	2	3	4	5	6	7	8	Final
(Newfoundland and Labrador) Stacie Curtis	0	1	1	1	0	0	0	X	3
(China) Han Yu 🔨	1	0	0	0	1	2	2	X	6

==== Draw 7 ====
Friday, October 6, 4:45 pm

Sheet 1	1	2	3	4	5	6	7	8	Final
(Ontario) Krista McCarville 🔨	1	0	1	0	0	0	1	X	3
(Scotland) Fay Henderson	0	2	0	1	1	2	0	X	6

Sheet 5	1	2	3	4	5	6	7	8	Final
(Ontario) Krysta Burns 🔨	0	5	3	0	X	X	X	X	8
(Ontario) Quinn Walsh	1	0	0	1	X	X	X	X	2

Sheet 6	1	2	3	4	5	6	7	8	9	Final
(Ontario) Chelsea Brandwood	2	1	2	0	0	0	0	1	0	6
(China) Wang Rui 🔨	0	0	0	2	1	1	2	0	1	7

==== Draw 8 ====
Friday, October 6, 7:15 pm

Sheet 3	1	2	3	4	5	6	7	8	Final
(Ontario) Hollie Duncan	0	2	0	2	1	2	0	X	7
(Ontario) Katelyn Wasylkiw 🔨	1	0	1	0	0	0	1	X	3

Sheet 4	1	2	3	4	5	6	7	8	Final
(Ontario) Kaitlin Jewer	0	0	0	2	0	0	2	0	4
(Ontario) Susan Froud 🔨	0	0	2	0	1	1	0	2	6

==== Draw 9 ====
Friday, October 6, 9:30 pm

Sheet 5	1	2	3	4	5	6	7	8	Final
(Switzerland) Corrie Hürlimann	0	0	0	0	3	2	1	2	8
(Ontario) Lauren Mann 🔨	0	4	0	5	0	0	0	0	9

Sheet 6	1	2	3	4	5	6	7	8	Final
(Japan) Ikue Kitazawa 🔨	0	0	1	1	1	2	2	X	7
(Ontario) Sarah Bailey	0	2	0	0	0	0	0	X	2

Sheet 7	1	2	3	4	5	6	7	8	Final
(South Korea) Kim Eun-jung 🔨	1	0	0	1	1	0	4	X	7
(Ontario) Paige Bown	0	1	0	0	0	0	0	X	1

==== Draw 10 ====
Saturday, October 7, 8:00 am

Sheet 4	1	2	3	4	5	6	7	8	Final
(Ontario) Katelyn Wasylkiw	0	4	0	1	0	0	X	X	5
(China) Wang Rui 🔨	1	0	1	0	3	3	X	X	8

Sheet 5	1	2	3	4	5	6	7	8	Final
(Ontario) Krista McCarville 🔨	2	0	0	1	0	1	2	X	6
(Ontario) Kaitlin Jewer	0	1	1	0	0	0	0	X	2

Sheet 6	1	2	3	4	5	6	7	8	Final
(Ontario) Shelley Hardy 🔨	0	3	3	0	3	X	X	X	9
(Ontario) Tori Zemmelink	1	0	0	1	0	X	X	X	2

Sheet 7	1	2	3	4	5	6	7	8	Final
(Ontario) Hailey Armstrong	1	0	1	0	1	0	0	X	3
(Newfoundland and Labrador) Stacie Curtis 🔨	0	0	0	2	0	5	1	X	8

==== Draw 11 ====
Saturday, October 7, 10:45 am

Sheet 1	1	2	3	4	5	6	7	8	9	Final
(Nova Scotia) Jessica Daigle 🔨	0	1	1	0	0	1	0	1	3	7
(China) Han Yu	1	0	0	2	0	0	1	0	0	4

Sheet 4	1	2	3	4	5	6	7	8	Final
(Ontario) Chelsea Brandwood 🔨	1	2	0	0	4	1	X	X	8
(Ontario) Paige Bown	0	0	1	1	0	0	X	X	2

Sheet 5	1	2	3	4	5	6	7	8	Final
(Japan) Team Yoshimura	0	0	2	1	2	0	0	X	5
(Ontario) Courtney Auld 🔨	0	1	0	0	0	1	1	X	3

==== Draw 12 ====
Saturday, October 7, 2:15 pm

Sheet 4	1	2	3	4	5	6	7	8	Final
(Ontario) Krysta Burns	0	3	0	1	1	0	2	X	7
(Ontario) Lauren Mann 🔨	0	0	1	0	0	1	0	X	2

Sheet 7	1	2	3	4	5	6	7	8	9	Final
(Scotland) Fay Henderson	0	1	1	0	2	0	0	0	1	5
(Ontario) Susan Froud 🔨	1	0	0	1	0	1	0	1	0	4

==== Draw 13 ====
Saturday, October 7, 4:45 pm

Sheet 1	1	2	3	4	5	6	7	8	Final
(Newfoundland and Labrador) Stacie Curtis	0	0	3	0	2	0	2	1	8
(Ontario) Sarah Bailey 🔨	2	1	0	1	0	1	0	0	5

Sheet 5	1	2	3	4	5	6	7	8	Final
(South Korea) Kim Eun-jung	0	2	0	1	0	0	4	0	7
(Ontario) Katelyn Wasylkiw 🔨	2	0	1	0	3	2	0	1	9

==== Draw 14 ====
Saturday, October 7, 7:15 pm

Sheet 2	1	2	3	4	5	6	7	8	Final
(Switzerland) Corrie Hürlimann 🔨	0	3	0	2	2	X	X	X	7
(Ontario) Tori Zemmelink	0	0	1	0	0	X	X	X	1

Sheet 4	1	2	3	4	5	6	7	8	Final
(Japan) Ikue Kitazawa	0	1	0	3	1	0	1	X	6
(Nova Scotia) Jessica Daigle 🔨	1	0	2	0	0	1	0	X	4

Sheet 5	1	2	3	4	5	6	7	8	Final
(Ontario) Hollie Duncan	0	0	1	0	1	1	2	0	5
(Ontario) Chelsea Brandwood 🔨	1	0	0	1	0	0	0	4	6

==== Draw 15 ====
Saturday, October 7, 9:30 pm

Sheet 3	1	2	3	4	5	6	7	8	Final
(Ontario) Lauren Mann	1	0	0	0	1	0	2	2	6
(Ontario) Quinn Walsh 🔨	0	1	0	1	0	2	0	0	4

Sheet 4	1	2	3	4	5	6	7	8	Final
(Ontario) Courtney Auld	0	0	2	2	0	0	0	0	4
(Ontario) Susan Froud 🔨	0	1	0	0	1	2	1	1	6

==== Draw 16 ====
Sunday, October 8, 8:00 am

Sheet 3	1	2	3	4	5	6	7	8	Final
(Ontario) Sarah Bailey 🔨	0	1	1	0	0	0	1	0	3
(China) Han Yu	2	0	0	1	0	1	0	1	5

Sheet 6	1	2	3	4	5	6	7	8	Final
(Japan) Team Yoshimura	0	0	0	0	1	0	X	X	1
(Ontario) Krista McCarville 🔨	0	2	1	2	0	1	X	X	6

Sheet 7	1	2	3	4	5	6	7	8	Final
(Ontario) Shelley Hardy	1	0	0	1	0	1	1	0	4
(Ontario) Krysta Burns 🔨	0	1	3	0	1	0	0	1	6

==== Draw 17 ====
Sunday, October 8, 10:45 am

Sheet 4	1	2	3	4	5	6	7	8	Final
(South Korea) Kim Eun-jung	0	2	2	0	0	3	1	X	8
(Ontario) Hollie Duncan 🔨	2	0	0	1	1	0	0	X	4

Sheet 5	1	2	3	4	5	6	7	8	Final
(Ontario) Paige Bown	0	0	1	0	1	0	X	X	2
(China) Wang Rui 🔨	1	2	0	0	0	3	X	X	6

==== Draw 18 ====
Sunday, October 8, 2:15 pm

Sheet 2	1	2	3	4	5	6	7	8	Final
(Scotland) Fay Henderson 🔨	0	0	0	1	0	0	0	X	1
(Ontario) Courtney Auld	0	0	1	0	1	1	1	X	4

Sheet 3	1	2	3	4	5	6	7	8	Final
(Ontario) Hailey Armstrong	4	0	4	1	1	X	X	X	10
(Nova Scotia) Jessica Daigle 🔨	0	2	0	0	0	X	X	X	2

==== Draw 19 ====
Sunday, October 8, 4:45 pm

Sheet 7	1	2	3	4	5	6	7	8	Final
(Ontario) Tori Zemmelink 🔨	2	0	0	2	4	3	X	X	11
(Ontario) Quinn Walsh	0	0	1	0	0	0	X	X	1

=== Tiebreaker ===
Sunday, October 8, 7:15 pm

Sheet 3	1	2	3	4	5	6	7	8	Final
(China) Han Yu 🔨	0	1	1	1	3	0	0	X	6
(Newfoundland and Labrador) Stacie Curtis	0	0	0	0	0	1	3	X	4

=== Playoffs ===
Quarterfinals
1	(Japan) Ikue Kitazawa	3
8	(China) Han Yu	4
4	(China) Wang Rui	4
5	(South Korea) Kim Eun-jung	9
3	(Ontario) Susan Froud	5
6	(Japan) Team Yoshimura	6
2	(Ontario) Krysta Burns	4
7	(Ontario) Lauren Mann	5

Semifinals
8	(China) Han Yu	4
5	(South Korea) Kim Eun-jung	8
6	(Japan) Team Yoshimura	7
7	(Ontario) Lauren Mann	2

Final
5	(South Korea) Kim Eun-jung	6
6	(Japan) Team Yoshimura	5

==== Quarterfinals ====
Monday, October 9, 8:00 am

Sheet 4	1	2	3	4	5	6	7	8	Final
(Japan) Ikue Kitazawa 🔨	0	0	1	1	0	0	0	1	3
(China) Han Yu	1	0	0	0	1	1	1	0	4

Sheet 5	1	2	3	4	5	6	7	8	Final
(China) Wang Rui	0	0	2	0	0	0	2	X	4
(South Korea) Kim Eun-jung 🔨	0	3	0	0	1	5	0	X	9

Sheet 6	1	2	3	4	5	6	7	8	Final
(Ontario) Susan Froud 🔨	1	1	0	2	0	1	0	0	5
(Japan) Team Yoshimura	0	0	2	0	2	0	0	2	6

Sheet 7	1	2	3	4	5	6	7	8	9	Final
(Ontario) Krysta Burns 🔨	0	0	1	1	0	1	0	1	0	4
(Ontario) Lauren Mann	0	1	0	0	2	0	1	0	1	5

==== Semifinals ====
Monday, October 9, 2:00 pm

Sheet 1	1	2	3	4	5	6	7	8	Final
(China) Han Yu	0	1	1	0	2	0	0	X	4
(South Korea) Kim Eun-jung 🔨	3	0	0	1	0	2	2	X	8

Sheet 2	1	2	3	4	5	6	7	8	Final
(Japan) Team Yoshimura 🔨	0	3	1	2	0	1	X	X	7
(Ontario) Lauren Mann	1	0	0	0	1	0	X	X	2

==== Final ====
Monday, October 9, 5:00 pm

Sheet 4	1	2	3	4	5	6	7	8	Final
(South Korea) Kim Eun-jung 🔨	0	1	0	2	0	1	0	2	6
(Japan) Team Yoshimura	0	0	1	0	1	0	3	0	5
