= 2022 Stu Sells Toronto Tankard =

- Host city: Toronto, Ontario
- Arena: High Park Club
- Dates: September 29 – October 2
- Men's winner: (Sweden) Team Edin
- Curling club: Karlstads CK, Karlstad
- Skip: Niklas Edin
- Third: Oskar Eriksson
- Second: Rasmus Wranå
- Lead: Christoffer Sundgren
- Coach: Fredrik Lindberg
- Finalist: (Norway) Magnus Ramsfjell
- Women's winner: (Switzerland) Team Tirinzoni
- Curling club: CC Aarau, Aarau
- Skip: Silvana Tirinzoni
- Fourth: Alina Pätz
- Second: Carole Howald
- Lead: Briar Schwaller-Hürlimann
- Coach: Pierre Charette
- Finalist: (Ontario) Isabelle Ladouceur

The 2022 Stu Sells Toronto Tankard was held from September 29 to October 2 at the High Park Club in Toronto, Ontario. The event was held in a triple knockout format with a purse of $40,000 on the men's side and $20,000 on the women's side. It was the first Stu Sells sponsored event held as part of the 2022–23 season.

In the men's event, Sweden's Niklas Edin rink continued their strong play from the 2022 Oslo Cup. After starting with an opening draw loss, the team of Edin, Oskar Eriksson, Rasmus Wranå and Christoffer Sundgren won six straight games to claim the championship title. In the final, they defeated Norway's Magnus Ramsfjell 7–3 with a score of three points in the eighth end. To advance to the final, Edin won 5–4 over Switzerland's Yannick Schwaller in an extra end semifinal while in the other, Ramsfjell defeated Nova Scotia's Travis Colter 5–2. Sam Mooibroek, Joël Retornaz, Tanner Horgan and Yves Stocker all qualified for the playoffs but lost in the quarterfinals.

The women's event final saw Switzerland's Silvana Tirinzoni rink of Tirinzoni, Alina Pätz, Carole Howald and Briar Schwaller-Hürlimann cap off an undefeated weekend with a narrow 6–5 victory over Ontario's Isabelle Ladouceur. This was the second title of the 2022–23 season for Team Tirinzoni as they also won the Summer Series event in August. In the semifinals, the Swiss rink beat South Korea's Kim Eun-jung 6–2 in a rematch of the 2022 World Women's Curling Championship gold medal game while in the other, Team Ladouceur downed Ottawa's Lauren Mann 9–4. Other teams that qualified for the women's playoff round include Hailey Armstrong, Andrea Kelly, Delaney Strouse and Danielle Inglis.

The event featured many international teams such as Edin, Retornaz, Schwaller, Kim and Tirinzoni as it was held the weekend before the 2022 National Grand Slam event.

== Men ==
=== Teams ===
The teams are listed as follows:

Skip	Third	Second	Lead	Alternate	Locale
Rob Ainsley	Dave Ellis	Graeme Robson	Darren Karn		Toronto, Ontario
Jason Camm	Ian Dickie	Zack Shurtleff	Punit Sthankiya		Cornwall, Ontario
Alex Champ	Charlie Richard	Terry Arnold	Scott Clinton		Kitchener–Waterloo, Ontario
Cameron MacKenzie (Fourth)	Travis Colter (Skip)	Ian Juurlink	Robby McLean		Halifax, Nova Scotia
Niklas Edin	Oskar Eriksson	Rasmus Wranå	Christoffer Sundgren		Karlstad, Sweden
Riley Fenson	Samuel Strouse	Connor Kauffman	Aidan Oldenburg	Jacob Zeman	(United States) Bemidji, Minnesota
Mike Fournier	Kevin Flewwelling	Sean Harrison	Zander Elmes		Toronto, Ontario
Daniel Hocevar	Matthew Prenevost	Quinn Heffron	Nelson Wang		Toronto, Ontario
Tanner Horgan	Joey Hart (Note: Joey Hart spared for Darren Moulding.)	Jacob Horgan	Colin Hodgson		Sudbury, Ontario
Glenn Howard	Scott Howard	David Mathers	Tim March		Penetanguishene, Ontario
Mark Kean	Cameron Goodkey	Wesley Forget	Ed Cyr		Ottawa, Ontario
Sam Mooibroek	Scott Mitchell	Nathan Steele	Colin Schnurr		Whitby, Ontario
Yusuke Morozumi	Yuta Matsumura	Ryotaro Shukuya	Kosuke Morozumi	Masaki Iwai	Karuizawa, Japan
Owen Purcell	Joel Krats	Adam McEachren	Scott Weagle		Halifax, Nova Scotia
Magnus Ramsfjell	Martin Sesaker	Bendik Ramsfjell	Gaute Nepstad		Trondheim, Norway
Joël Retornaz	Amos Mosaner	Sebastiano Arman	Mattia Giovanella		Trentino, Italy
Benoît Schwarz (Fourth)	Yannick Schwaller (Skip)	Sven Michel	Pablo Lachat		Geneva, Switzerland
Jason Smith	Dominik Märki	Jared Allen	Hunter Clawson		(United States) Nashville, Tennessee
Jan Hess (Fourth)	Yves Stocker (Skip)	Simon Gloor	Felix Eberhard		Zug, Switzerland
Stuart Thompson	Kendal Thompson	Colton Steele	Michael Brophy		Halifax, Nova Scotia

=== Knockout brackets ===
==== A event ====
First Knockout	Qualifier 1
(Sweden) Niklas Edin	7
(Nova Scotia) Stuart Thompson	6	(Nova Scotia) Stuart Thompson	8
(Ontario) Daniel Hocevar	3	(Nova Scotia) Stuart Thompson	2
(Ontario) Sam Mooibroek	8
(Ontario) Sam Mooibroek	9
(Nova Scotia) Owen Purcell	5
(Ontario) Sam Mooibroek	8
(Ontario) Glenn Howard	6
(Ontario) Glenn Howard	11
(Ontario) Mike Fournier	6	(United States) Riley Fenson	1
(United States) Riley Fenson	7	(Ontario) Glenn Howard	7
(Ontario) Tanner Horgan	1
(Ontario) Tanner Horgan	4
(Ontario) Jason Camm	3

First Knockout	Qualifier 2
(Italy) Joël Retornaz	6
(Nova Scotia) Travis Colter	8	(Nova Scotia) Travis Colter	4
(Ontario) Alex Champ	1	(Italy) Joël Retornaz	8
(Switzerland) Yves Stocker	1
(Switzerland) Yves Stocker	5
(Ontario) Mark Kean	3
(Italy) Joël Retornaz	8
(Norway) Magnus Ramsfjell	2
(Switzerland) Yannick Schwaller	5
(Ontario) Rob Ainsley	7	(Ontario) Rob Ainsley	3
(United States) Jason Smith	3	(Switzerland) Yannick Schwaller	4
(Norway) Magnus Ramsfjell	8
(Norway) Magnus Ramsfjell	8
(Japan) Yusuke Morozumi	6

==== B event ====
Second Knockout	Qualifier 3
(United States) Riley Fenson	3
(Nova Scotia) Owen Purcell	7	(Nova Scotia) Owen Purcell	6
(Ontario) Daniel Hocevar	4	(Nova Scotia) Owen Purcell	4
(Sweden) Niklas Edin	5
(Sweden) Niklas Edin	8
(Ontario) Jason Camm	5	(Ontario) Mike Fournier	5
(Ontario) Mike Fournier	9	(Sweden) Niklas Edin	7
(Norway) Magnus Ramsfjell	4

Second Knockout	Qualifier 4
(Ontario) Rob Ainsley	2
(Ontario) Mark Kean	8	(Ontario) Mark Kean	7
(Ontario) Alex Champ	1	(Ontario) Mark Kean	4
(Nova Scotia) Travis Colter	9
(Nova Scotia) Travis Colter	8
(Japan) Yusuke Morozumi	7	(Japan) Yusuke Morozumi	2
(United States) Jason Smith	4	(Nova Scotia) Travis Colter	7
(Ontario) Glenn Howard	4

Second Knockout		Qualifier 5
(Nova Scotia) Stuart Thompson	1
(Ontario) Tanner Horgan	7	(Ontario) Tanner Horgan	3
(Switzerland) Yves Stocker	0	(Switzerland) Yannick Schwaller	2
(Switzerland) Yannick Schwaller	7

==== C event ====
Third Knockout	Qualifier 6
(Ontario) Mike Fournier	5
(Ontario) Daniel Hocevar	3	(Ontario) Mike Fournier	7
(United States) Riley Fenson	6	(United States) Riley Fenson	4
(Ontario) Jason Camm	5	(Ontario) Mike Fournier	0
(Switzerland) Yves Stocker	8
(Switzerland) Yves Stocker	5
(Ontario) Glenn Howard	2

Third Knockout		Qualifier 7
(Nova Scotia) Owen Purcell	5
(Ontario) Mark Kean	7	(Ontario) Mark Kean	6
		(Switzerland) Yannick Schwaller	8

Third Knockout						Qualifier 8
				(Nova Scotia) Stuart Thompson	4
(Japan) Yusuke Morozumi	4			(Ontario) Rob Ainsley	5
(Ontario) Alex Champ	10	(Ontario) Alex Champ	4
(Ontario) Rob Ainsley	5	(Ontario) Rob Ainsley	5
(United States) Jason Smith	4					(Ontario) Rob Ainsley	4
						(Norway) Magnus Ramsfjell	8

=== Knockout results ===
All draw times are listed in Eastern Time (UTC−04:00).

==== Draw 1 ====
Thursday, September 29, 8:00 am

Sheet 3	1	2	3	4	5	6	7	8	Final
(Nova Scotia) Stuart Thompson	0	0	0	3	0	0	3	X	6
(Ontario) Daniel Hocevar 🔨	0	1	1	0	0	1	0	X	3

Sheet 4	1	2	3	4	5	6	7	8	9	Final
(Ontario) Mike Fournier 🔨	1	1	0	1	0	1	0	2	0	6
(United States) Riley Fenson	0	0	3	0	1	0	2	0	1	7

Sheet 5	1	2	3	4	5	6	7	8	Final
(Nova Scotia) Travis Colter	1	1	0	3	1	2	X	X	8
(Ontario) Alex Champ 🔨	0	0	1	0	0	0	X	X	1

==== Draw 2 ====
Thursday, September 29, 10:30 am

Sheet 3	1	2	3	4	5	6	7	8	Final
(Ontario) Rob Ainsley 🔨	1	1	1	0	0	2	0	2	7
(United States) Jason Smith	0	0	0	1	2	0	0	0	3

Sheet 4	1	2	3	4	5	6	7	8	Final
(Ontario) Sam Mooibroek 🔨	3	0	2	0	1	0	3	X	9
(Nova Scotia) Owen Purcell	0	1	0	2	0	2	0	X	5

Sheet 5	1	2	3	4	5	6	7	8	Final
(Ontario) Tanner Horgan	0	1	1	0	1	0	0	1	4
(Ontario) Jason Camm 🔨	1	0	0	1	0	0	1	0	3

==== Draw 3 ====
Thursday, September 29, 1:30 pm

Sheet 1	1	2	3	4	5	6	7	8	Final
(Switzerland) Yves Stocker 🔨	0	0	2	0	2	0	0	1	5
(Ontario) Mark Kean	1	0	0	1	0	1	0	0	3

Sheet 2	1	2	3	4	5	6	7	8	Final
(Sweden) Niklas Edin 🔨	0	0	2	0	3	0	2	0	7
(Nova Scotia) Stuart Thompson	0	1	0	3	0	2	0	2	8

Sheet 3	1	2	3	4	5	6	7	8	9	Final
(Norway) Magnus Ramsfjell 🔨	1	1	0	2	0	1	0	1	2	8
(Japan) Yusuke Morozumi	0	0	2	0	1	0	3	0	0	6

==== Draw 4 ====
Thursday, September 29, 4:00 pm

Sheet 3	1	2	3	4	5	6	7	8	Final
(Ontario) Glenn Howard 🔨	2	0	5	4	X	X	X	X	11
(United States) Riley Fenson	0	1	0	0	X	X	X	X	1

Sheet 4	1	2	3	4	5	6	7	8	Final
(Italy) Joël Retornaz 🔨	4	0	1	0	0	0	1	X	6
(Nova Scotia) Travis Colter	0	1	0	1	1	1	0	X	4

==== Draw 5 ====
Thursday, September 29, 7:00 pm

Sheet 1	1	2	3	4	5	6	7	8	Final
(Ontario) Jason Camm 🔨	0	2	0	1	0	2	0	X	5
(Ontario) Mike Fournier	2	0	1	0	1	0	5	X	9

Sheet 2	1	2	3	4	5	6	7	8	Final
(Switzerland) Yannick Schwaller 🔨	2	0	1	0	1	0	0	1	5
(Ontario) Rob Ainsley	0	0	0	1	0	1	1	0	3

Sheet 5	1	2	3	4	5	6	7	8	Final
(Nova Scotia) Owen Purcell 🔨	0	2	0	1	1	3	0	X	7
(Ontario) Daniel Hocevar	2	0	1	0	0	0	1	X	4

==== Draw 6 ====
Thursday, September 29, 9:30 pm

Sheet 4	1	2	3	4	5	6	7	8	Final
(Ontario) Mark Kean 🔨	1	0	3	4	X	X	X	X	8
(Ontario) Alex Champ	0	1	0	0	X	X	X	X	1

Sheet 5	1	2	3	4	5	6	7	8	Final
(Japan) Yusuke Morozumi 🔨	1	1	0	2	2	1	0	X	7
(United States) Jason Smith	0	0	2	0	0	0	2	X	4

==== Draw 7 ====
Friday, September 30, 8:00 am

Sheet 1	1	2	3	4	5	6	7	8	Final
(Nova Scotia) Stuart Thompson 🔨	1	0	0	1	0	X	X	X	2
(Ontario) Sam Mooibroek	0	2	3	0	3	X	X	X	8

Sheet 2	1	2	3	4	5	6	7	8	Final
(Ontario) Glenn Howard 🔨	1	2	0	4	X	X	X	X	7
(Ontario) Tanner Horgan	0	0	1	0	X	X	X	X	1

Sheet 3	1	2	3	4	5	6	7	8	Final
(Italy) Joël Retornaz 🔨	2	0	2	3	1	X	X	X	8
(Switzerland) Yves Stocker	0	1	0	0	0	X	X	X	1

==== Draw 8 ====
Friday, September 30, 10:30 am

Sheet 3	1	2	3	4	5	6	7	8	Final
(United States) Riley Fenson 🔨	0	0	0	1	0	1	0	1	3
(Nova Scotia) Owen Purcell	0	0	1	0	2	0	3	0	6

Sheet 4	1	2	3	4	5	6	7	8	Final
(Switzerland) Yannick Schwaller 🔨	0	2	0	2	0	0	0	0	4
(Norway) Magnus Ramsfjell	1	0	2	0	1	1	1	2	8

==== Draw 9 ====
Friday, September 30, 1:30 pm

Sheet 2	1	2	3	4	5	6	7	8	Final
(Nova Scotia) Travis Colter 🔨	2	0	3	0	3	X	X	X	8
(Japan) Yusuke Morozumi	0	1	0	1	0	X	X	X	2

Sheet 3	1	2	3	4	5	6	7	8	Final
(Sweden) Niklas Edin 🔨	2	0	1	0	3	0	2	X	8
(Ontario) Mike Fournier	0	2	0	2	0	1	0	X	5

Sheet 5	1	2	3	4	5	6	7	8	Final
(Ontario) Rob Ainsley 🔨	1	0	1	0	0	0	X	X	2
(Ontario) Mark Kean	0	2	0	2	1	2	X	X	7

==== Draw 10 ====
Friday, September 30, 4:00 pm

Sheet 2	1	2	3	4	5	6	7	8	Final
(Nova Scotia) Stuart Thompson	0	0	1	0	0	0	0	X	1
(Ontario) Tanner Horgan 🔨	0	1	0	0	2	2	2	X	7

Sheet 4	1	2	3	4	5	6	7	8	Final
(Switzerland) Yves Stocker	0	0	0	0	X	X	X	X	0
(Switzerland) Yannick Schwaller 🔨	2	2	1	2	X	X	X	X	7

==== Draw 11 ====
Friday, September 30, 7:00 pm

Sheet 1	1	2	3	4	5	6	7	8	Final
(Japan) Yusuke Morozumi 🔨	2	0	0	0	0	2	0	X	4
(Ontario) Alex Champ	0	1	2	3	1	0	3	X	10

Sheet 4	1	2	3	4	5	6	7	8	Final
(United States) Riley Fenson 🔨	0	1	0	2	0	1	0	2	6
(Ontario) Jason Camm	1	0	1	0	1	0	2	0	5

Sheet 5	1	2	3	4	5	6	7	8	Final
(Nova Scotia) Owen Purcell	0	0	1	1	0	0	2	0	4
(Sweden) Niklas Edin 🔨	1	0	0	0	1	2	0	1	5

==== Draw 12 ====
Friday, September 30, 9:30 pm

Sheet 1	1	2	3	4	5	6	7	8	9	Final
(Ontario) Rob Ainsley	0	0	1	1	0	0	0	2	1	5
(United States) Jason Smith 🔨	0	0	0	0	2	1	1	0	0	4

Sheet 2	1	2	3	4	5	6	7	8	Final
(Ontario) Mike Fournier 🔨	0	0	0	4	0	1	0	X	5
(Ontario) Daniel Hocevar	0	1	1	0	1	0	0	X	3

==== Draw 13 ====
Saturday, October 1, 8:00 am

Sheet 1	1	2	3	4	5	6	7	8	Final
(Italy) Joël Retornaz 🔨	0	2	0	0	2	2	2	X	8
(Norway) Magnus Ramsfjell	1	0	0	1	0	0	0	X	2

Sheet 3	1	2	3	4	5	6	7	8	Final
(Ontario) Mark Kean	0	0	2	0	2	0	0	0	4
(Nova Scotia) Travis Colter 🔨	0	1	0	1	0	4	1	2	9

Sheet 5	1	2	3	4	5	6	7	8	Final
(Ontario) Sam Mooibroek	0	2	0	0	0	4	0	2	8
(Ontario) Glenn Howard 🔨	3	0	0	0	1	0	2	0	6

==== Draw 14 ====
Saturday, October 1, 10:30 am

Sheet 1	1	2	3	4	5	6	7	8	Final
(Ontario) Mike Fournier 🔨	0	0	2	2	1	2	0	X	7
(United States) Riley Fenson	1	1	0	0	0	0	2	X	4

Sheet 3	1	2	3	4	5	6	7	8	Final
(Ontario) Alex Champ 🔨	0	0	2	0	0	0	2	0	4
(Ontario) Rob Ainsley	1	1	0	1	0	1	0	1	5

==== Draw 15 ====
Saturday, October 1, 1:30 pm

Sheet 1	1	2	3	4	5	6	7	8	Final
(Nova Scotia) Travis Colter	0	0	4	0	3	0	X	X	7
(Ontario) Glenn Howard 🔨	2	0	0	1	0	1	X	X	4

Sheet 2	1	2	3	4	5	6	7	8	Final
(Sweden) Niklas Edin	0	2	1	0	2	0	0	2	7
(Norway) Magnus Ramsfjell 🔨	1	0	0	1	0	2	0	0	4

Sheet 3	1	2	3	4	5	6	7	8	Final
(Ontario) Tanner Horgan 🔨	0	0	0	1	0	1	0	1	3
(Switzerland) Yannick Schwaller	0	0	0	0	1	0	1	0	2

==== Draw 16 ====
Saturday, October 1, 4:00 pm

Sheet 1	1	2	3	4	5	6	7	8	Final
(Nova Scotia) Owen Purcell	0	0	0	2	0	2	1	0	5
(Ontario) Mark Kean 🔨	1	2	2	0	1	0	0	1	7

Sheet 5	1	2	3	4	5	6	7	8	Final
(Ontario) Mike Fournier	0	0	0	0	X	X	X	X	0
(Switzerland) Yves Stocker 🔨	0	4	1	3	X	X	X	X	8

==== Draw 17 ====
Saturday, October 1, 7:00 pm

Sheet 2	1	2	3	4	5	6	7	8	Final
(Nova Scotia) Stuart Thompson	1	0	0	2	0	0	1	0	4
(Ontario) Rob Ainsley 🔨	0	1	0	0	1	1	0	2	5

Sheet 4	1	2	3	4	5	6	7	8	Final
(Switzerland) Yves Stocker 🔨	0	2	1	1	0	0	1	X	5
(Ontario) Glenn Howard	0	0	0	0	1	1	0	X	2

==== Draw 18 ====
Saturday, October 1, 10:00 pm

Sheet 1	1	2	3	4	5	6	7	8	Final
(Ontario) Rob Ainsley	0	2	0	1	0	1	0	X	4
(Norway) Magnus Ramsfjell 🔨	1	0	2	0	3	0	2	X	8

Sheet 5	1	2	3	4	5	6	7	8	Final
(Ontario) Mark Kean	0	2	0	1	0	2	1	0	6
(Switzerland) Yannick Schwaller 🔨	2	0	1	0	3	0	0	2	8

=== Playoffs ===
Quarterfinals
1	(Ontario) Sam Mooibroek	4
8	(Norway) Magnus Ramsfjell	6
4	(Nova Scotia) Travis Colter	7
5	(Ontario) Tanner Horgan	4
3	(Sweden) Niklas Edin	8
6	(Switzerland) Yves Stocker	2
2	(Italy) Joël Retornaz	2
7	(Switzerland) Yannick Schwaller	5

Semifinals
8	(Norway) Magnus Ramsfjell	5
4	(Nova Scotia) Travis Colter	2
3	(Sweden) Niklas Edin	5
7	(Switzerland) Yannick Schwaller	4

Final
8	(Norway) Magnus Ramsfjell	3
3	(Sweden) Niklas Edin	7

==== Quarterfinals ====
Sunday, October 2, 8:00 am

Sheet 2	1	2	3	4	5	6	7	8	Final
(Sweden) Niklas Edin 🔨	2	2	0	2	0	2	X	X	8
(Switzerland) Yves Stocker	0	0	1	0	1	0	X	X	2

Sheet 3	1	2	3	4	5	6	7	8	Final
(Ontario) Sam Mooibroek 🔨	0	2	1	0	0	1	0	X	4
(Norway) Magnus Ramsfjell	0	0	0	4	0	0	2	X	6

Sheet 4	1	2	3	4	5	6	7	8	Final
(Italy) Joël Retornaz 🔨	0	1	0	0	0	0	1	X	2
(Switzerland) Yannick Schwaller	0	0	1	1	2	1	0	X	5

Sheet 5	1	2	3	4	5	6	7	8	Final
(Nova Scotia) Travis Colter 🔨	1	0	1	0	2	3	0	X	7
(Ontario) Tanner Horgan	0	0	0	2	0	0	2	X	4

==== Semifinals ====
Sunday, October 2, 2:00 pm

Sheet 4	1	2	3	4	5	6	7	8	Final
(Norway) Magnus Ramsfjell	0	0	1	1	0	2	1	X	5
(Nova Scotia) Travis Colter 🔨	0	1	0	0	1	0	0	X	2

Sheet 5	1	2	3	4	5	6	7	8	9	Final
(Sweden) Niklas Edin 🔨	0	0	0	0	1	0	3	0	1	5
(Switzerland) Yannick Schwaller	0	0	0	0	0	2	0	2	0	4

==== Final ====
Sunday, October 2, 5:00 pm

Sheet 2	1	2	3	4	5	6	7	8	Final
(Norway) Magnus Ramsfjell	0	0	1	0	0	1	1	0	3
(Sweden) Niklas Edin 🔨	1	0	0	1	2	0	0	3	7

== Women ==
=== Teams ===
The teams are listed as follows:

Skip	Third	Second	Lead	Alternate	Locale
Hailey Armstrong	Megan Smith	Jessica Humphries	Terri Weeks		Waterloo, Ontario
Cathy Auld	Chrissy Cadorin	Cayla Auld	Courtney Auld		Thornhill, Ontario
Chelsea Brandwood	Brenda Holloway	Riley Sandham	Hilary Nuhn	Jordan Brandwood	Listowel, Ontario
Krysta Burns	Katie Ford	Sara Guy	Laura Masters		Sudbury, Ontario
Emily Deschenes	Emma Artichuk	Grace Lloyd	Adrienne Belliveau		Ottawa, Ontario
Clancy Grandy	Kayla MacMillan	Lindsay Dubue	Sarah Loken		Vancouver, British Columbia
Jacqueline Harrison	Allison Flaxey	Lynn Kreviazuk	Laura Hickey		Dundas, Ontario
Carly Howard	Stephanie Matheson	Grace Holyoke	Jestyn Murphy		Mississauga, Ontario
Danielle Inglis	Kira Brunton	Cheryl Kreviazuk	Cassandra de Groot		Whitby, Ontario
Mackenzie Zacharias (Note: Team Jones was skipped by Mackenzie Zacharias as Jennifer Jones was competing in the Hardline Open mixed doubles event.)	Karlee Burgess	Emily Zacharias	Lauren Lenentine		Winnipeg, Manitoba
Andrea Kelly	Sylvie Quillian	Jill Brothers	Katie Forward		Fredericton, New Brunswick
Mackenzie Kiemele	Jillian Uniacke	Cassie Barnard	Emma McKenzie		Toronto, Ontario
Kim Eun-jung	Kim Kyeong-ae	Kim Cho-hi	Kim Seon-yeong	Kim Yeong-mi	Gangneung, South Korea
Isabelle Ladouceur	Jamie Smith	Grace Lloyd	Rachel Steele		Waterloo, Ontario
Lauren Mann	Shelley Hardy	Stephanie LeDrew	Stephanie Corrado	Marteen Jones	Ottawa, Ontario
Breanna Rozon	Calissa Daly	Michaela Robert	Alice Holyoke		Mississauga, Ontario
Laurie St-Georges	Alanna Routledge	Emily Riley	Kelly Middaugh		Laval, Quebec
Delaney Strouse	Anne O'Hara	Sydney Mullaney	Rebecca Rodgers	Susan Dudt	(United States) Minneapolis, Minnesota
Alina Pätz (Fourth)	Silvana Tirinzoni (Skip)	Carole Howald	Briar Schwaller-Hürlimann		Aarau, Switzerland
Rhonda Varnes	Janelle Lach	Hallie McCannell	Jolene Callum	Sarah-Jane Sass	Portage la Prairie, Manitoba

=== Knockout brackets ===
==== A event ====
First Knockout	Qualifier 1
(Switzerland) Silvana Tirinzoni	8
(United States) Delaney Strouse	9	(United States) Delaney Strouse	3
(Ontario) Krysta Burns	3	(Switzerland) Silvana Tirinzoni	7
(Ontario) Danielle Inglis	4
(Ontario) Danielle Inglis	9
(Ontario) Jacqueline Harrison	4
(Switzerland) Silvana Tirinzoni	9
(British Columbia) Clancy Grandy	3
(British Columbia) Clancy Grandy	7
(Ontario) Emily Deschenes	4	(Ontario) Hailey Armstrong	2
(Ontario) Hailey Armstrong	8	(British Columbia) Clancy Grandy	8
(New Brunswick) Andrea Kelly	3
(New Brunswick) Andrea Kelly	9
(Ontario) Cathy Auld	6

First Knockout	Qualifier 2
(South Korea) Kim Eun-jung	4
(Ontario) Lauren Mann	10	(Ontario) Lauren Mann	5
(Ontario) Mackenzie Kiemele	3	(Ontario) Lauren Mann	8
(Ontario) Isabelle Ladouceur	5
(Ontario) Isabelle Ladouceur	8
(Ontario) Chelsea Brandwood	2
(Ontario) Lauren Mann	7
(Ontario) Breanna Rozon	1
(Manitoba) Team Jones	10
(Quebec) Laurie St-Georges	10	(Quebec) Laurie St-Georges	3
(Manitoba) Rhonda Varnes	3	(Manitoba) Team Jones	3
(Ontario) Breanna Rozon	8
(Ontario) Carly Howard	2
(Ontario) Breanna Rozon	6

==== B event ====
Second Knockout	Qualifier 3
(Ontario) Hailey Armstrong	4
(Ontario) Jacqueline Harrison	6	(Ontario) Jacqueline Harrison	3
(Ontario) Krysta Burns	5	(Ontario) Hailey Armstrong	7
(United States) Delaney Strouse	4
(United States) Delaney Strouse	7
(Ontario) Cathy Auld	7	(Ontario) Cathy Auld	2
(Ontario) Emily Deschenes	6	(Ontario) Hailey Armstrong	5
(Ontario) Breanna Rozon	3

Second Knockout	Qualifier 4
(Quebec) Laurie St-Georges	5
(Ontario) Chelsea Brandwood	8	(Ontario) Chelsea Brandwood	3
(Ontario) Mackenzie Kiemele	1	(Quebec) Laurie St-Georges	3
(South Korea) Kim Eun-jung	6
(South Korea) Kim Eun-jung	6
(Ontario) Carly Howard	4	(Manitoba) Rhonda Varnes	5
(Manitoba) Rhonda Varnes	8	(South Korea) Kim Eun-jung	6
(British Columbia) Clancy Grandy	4

Second Knockout		Qualifier 5
(Ontario) Danielle Inglis	5
(New Brunswick) Andrea Kelly	6	(New Brunswick) Andrea Kelly	6
(Ontario) Isabelle Ladouceur	2	(Manitoba) Team Jones	2
(Manitoba) Team Jones	7

==== C event ====
Third Knockout	Qualifier 6
(Ontario) Cathy Auld	7
(Ontario) Krysta Burns	8	(Ontario) Krysta Burns	10
(Ontario) Jacqueline Harrison	7	(Ontario) Emily Deschenes	3
(Ontario) Emily Deschenes	9	(Ontario) Krysta Burns	4
(Ontario) Isabelle Ladouceur	6
(Ontario) Isabelle Ladouceur	11
(British Columbia) Clancy Grandy	4

Third Knockout		Qualifier 7
(United States) Delaney Strouse	8
(Quebec) Laurie St-Georges	5	(United States) Delaney Strouse	8
		(Manitoba) Team Jones	1

Third Knockout						Qualifier 8
				(Ontario) Danielle Inglis	10
(Manitoba) Rhonda Varnes	5			(Ontario) Chelsea Brandwood	7
(Ontario) Mackenzie Kiemele	4	(Manitoba) Rhonda Varnes	5
(Ontario) Chelsea Brandwood	8	(Ontario) Chelsea Brandwood	6
(Ontario) Carly Howard	2					(Ontario) Danielle Inglis	7
						(Ontario) Breanna Rozon	3

=== Knockout results ===
All draw times are listed in Eastern Time (UTC−04:00).

==== Draw 1 ====
Thursday, September 29, 8:00 am

Sheet 1	1	2	3	4	5	6	7	8	Final
(United States) Delaney Strouse	1	1	4	0	2	1	X	X	9
(Ontario) Krysta Burns 🔨	0	0	0	3	0	0	X	X	3

Sheet 2	1	2	3	4	5	6	7	8	Final
(Ontario) Emily Deschenes 🔨	0	2	0	1	1	0	0	X	4
(Ontario) Hailey Armstrong	1	0	3	0	0	3	1	X	8

==== Draw 2 ====
Thursday, September 29, 10:30 am

Sheet 1	1	2	3	4	5	6	7	8	Final
(Ontario) Lauren Mann	2	0	2	1	1	0	4	X	10
(Ontario) Mackenzie Kiemele 🔨	0	1	0	0	0	2	0	X	3

Sheet 2	1	2	3	4	5	6	7	8	Final
(Quebec) Laurie St-Georges 🔨	2	0	1	2	0	1	4	X	10
(Manitoba) Rhonda Varnes	0	2	0	0	1	0	0	X	3

==== Draw 3 ====
Thursday, September 29, 1:30 pm

Sheet 4	1	2	3	4	5	6	7	8	Final
(New Brunswick) Andrea Kelly 🔨	2	0	2	0	2	1	0	2	9
(Ontario) Cathy Auld	0	2	0	2	0	0	2	0	6

Sheet 5	1	2	3	4	5	6	7	8	Final
(Ontario) Danielle Inglis	0	2	0	2	1	0	4	X	9
(Ontario) Jacqueline Harrison 🔨	1	0	1	0	0	2	0	X	4

==== Draw 4 ====
Thursday, September 29, 4:00 pm

Sheet 1	1	2	3	4	5	6	7	8	Final
(Ontario) Isabelle Ladouceur 🔨	0	2	1	4	0	1	X	X	8
(Ontario) Chelsea Brandwood	1	0	0	0	1	0	X	X	2

Sheet 2	1	2	3	4	5	6	7	8	Final
(Switzerland) Silvana Tirinzoni	0	2	1	3	0	0	2	X	8
(United States) Delaney Strouse 🔨	1	0	0	0	1	1	0	X	3

Sheet 5	1	2	3	4	5	6	7	8	Final
(Ontario) Carly Howard	0	0	0	1	1	0	0	X	2
(Ontario) Breanna Rozon 🔨	0	1	1	0	0	2	2	X	6

==== Draw 5 ====
Thursday, September 29, 7:00 pm

Sheet 3	1	2	3	4	5	6	7	8	Final
(British Columbia) Clancy Grandy 🔨	3	0	1	0	3	X	X	X	7
(Ontario) Hailey Armstrong	0	1	0	1	0	X	X	X	2

Sheet 4	1	2	3	4	5	6	7	8	Final
(South Korea) Kim Eun-jung 🔨	2	0	1	0	0	0	1	0	4
(Ontario) Lauren Mann	0	1	0	1	1	1	0	1	5

==== Draw 6 ====
Thursday, September 29, 9:30 pm

Sheet 1	1	2	3	4	5	6	7	8	9	Final
(Ontario) Cathy Auld	0	2	1	0	0	2	1	0	1	7
(Ontario) Emily Deschenes 🔨	1	0	0	2	1	0	0	2	0	6

Sheet 2	1	2	3	4	5	6	7	8	9	Final
(Ontario) Jacqueline Harrison 🔨	0	0	1	0	2	0	2	0	1	6
(Ontario) Krysta Burns	0	2	0	1	0	1	0	1	0	5

Sheet 3	1	2	3	4	5	6	7	8	Final
(Manitoba) Team Jones	0	0	2	0	3	0	5	X	10
(Quebec) Laurie St-Georges 🔨	0	1	0	1	0	1	0	X	3

==== Draw 7 ====
Friday, September 30, 8:00 am

Sheet 4	1	2	3	4	5	6	7	8	Final
(Ontario) Chelsea Brandwood	0	4	2	1	1	X	X	X	8
(Ontario) Mackenzie Kiemele 🔨	1	0	0	0	0	X	X	X	1

Sheet 5	1	2	3	4	5	6	7	8	Final
(Ontario) Carly Howard	1	1	0	0	2	0	0	X	4
(Manitoba) Rhonda Varnes 🔨	0	0	2	2	0	3	1	X	8

==== Draw 8 ====
Friday, September 30, 10:30 am

Sheet 1	1	2	3	4	5	6	7	8	Final
(British Columbia) Clancy Grandy 🔨	0	2	0	2	1	1	2	X	8
(New Brunswick) Andrea Kelly	2	0	1	0	0	0	0	X	3

Sheet 2	1	2	3	4	5	6	7	8	Final
(Switzerland) Silvana Tirinzoni 🔨	0	2	1	0	3	1	0	X	7
(Ontario) Danielle Inglis	2	0	0	1	0	0	1	X	4

Sheet 5	1	2	3	4	5	6	7	8	Final
(Ontario) Lauren Mann 🔨	3	0	1	0	1	1	1	1	8
(Ontario) Isabelle Ladouceur	0	1	0	4	0	0	0	0	5

==== Draw 9 ====
Friday, September 30, 1:30 pm

Sheet 1	1	2	3	4	5	6	7	8	Final
(Manitoba) Team Jones 🔨	0	1	0	1	0	1	0	X	3
(Ontario) Breanna Rozon	3	0	1	0	1	0	3	X	8

Sheet 4	1	2	3	4	5	6	7	8	Final
(Ontario) Hailey Armstrong 🔨	1	0	0	0	2	0	0	1	4
(Ontario) Jacqueline Harrison	0	0	0	0	0	2	1	0	3

==== Draw 10 ====
Friday, September 30, 4:00 pm

Sheet 1	1	2	3	4	5	6	7	8	9	Final
(South Korea) Kim Eun-jung	0	2	0	2	0	1	0	0	1	6
(Manitoba) Rhonda Varnes 🔨	0	0	2	0	1	0	1	1	0	5

Sheet 3	1	2	3	4	5	6	7	8	Final
(United States) Delaney Strouse 🔨	3	0	1	2	1	0	X	X	7
(Ontario) Cathy Auld	0	1	0	0	0	1	X	X	2

Sheet 5	1	2	3	4	5	6	7	8	Final
(Quebec) Laurie St-Georges 🔨	1	0	0	2	0	0	0	2	5
(Ontario) Chelsea Brandwood	0	0	1	0	0	2	0	0	3

==== Draw 11 ====
Friday, September 30, 7:00 pm

Sheet 2	1	2	3	4	5	6	7	8	Final
(Ontario) Danielle Inglis 🔨	0	0	0	3	0	0	2	0	5
(New Brunswick) Andrea Kelly	1	1	2	0	0	1	0	1	6

Sheet 3	1	2	3	4	5	6	7	8	Final
(Ontario) Chelsea Brandwood 🔨	2	0	1	2	1	2	X	X	8
(Ontario) Carly Howard	0	2	0	0	0	0	X	X	2

==== Draw 12 ====
Friday, September 30, 9:30 pm

Sheet 3	1	2	3	4	5	6	7	8	9	Final
(Ontario) Jacqueline Harrison	0	0	0	0	3	3	0	1	0	7
(Ontario) Emily Deschenes 🔨	0	2	1	1	0	0	3	0	2	9

Sheet 4	1	2	3	4	5	6	7	8	Final
(Manitoba) Rhonda Varnes	1	0	0	1	0	1	2	0	5
(Ontario) Mackenzie Kiemele 🔨	0	1	1	0	1	0	0	1	4

Sheet 5	1	2	3	4	5	6	7	8	Final
(Ontario) Cathy Auld 🔨	1	0	3	0	3	0	0	0	7
(Ontario) Krysta Burns	0	1	0	1	0	1	3	2	8

==== Draw 13 ====
Saturday, October 1, 8:00 am

Sheet 2	1	2	3	4	5	6	7	8	Final
(Ontario) Hailey Armstrong 🔨	1	0	0	2	0	4	0	X	7
(United States) Delaney Strouse	0	1	1	0	1	0	1	X	4

Sheet 4	1	2	3	4	5	6	7	8	Final
(Quebec) Laurie St-Georges	0	0	1	2	0	0	0	0	3
(South Korea) Kim Eun-jung 🔨	1	0	0	0	1	2	1	1	6

==== Draw 14 ====
Saturday, October 1, 10:30 am

Sheet 2	1	2	3	4	5	6	7	8	Final
(Ontario) Isabelle Ladouceur	0	0	0	2	0	0	X	X	2
(Manitoba) Team Jones 🔨	1	1	1	0	3	1	X	X	7

Sheet 4	1	2	3	4	5	6	7	8	Final
(Ontario) Lauren Mann 🔨	0	1	0	4	1	1	X	X	7
(Ontario) Breanna Rozon	0	0	1	0	0	0	X	X	1

Sheet 5	1	2	3	4	5	6	7	8	Final
(Switzerland) Silvana Tirinzoni	0	3	1	0	3	2	X	X	9
(British Columbia) Clancy Grandy 🔨	2	0	0	1	0	0	X	X	3

==== Draw 15 ====
Saturday, October 1, 1:30 pm

Sheet 4	1	2	3	4	5	6	7	8	Final
(Ontario) Krysta Burns 🔨	0	3	3	0	0	4	X	X	10
(Ontario) Emily Deschenes	0	0	0	1	2	0	X	X	3

Sheet 5	1	2	3	4	5	6	7	8	9	Final
(Manitoba) Rhonda Varnes	2	0	1	0	0	0	2	0	0	5
(Ontario) Chelsea Brandwood 🔨	0	1	0	2	0	1	0	1	1	6

==== Draw 16 ====
Saturday, October 1, 4:00 pm

Sheet 2	1	2	3	4	5	6	7	8	Final
(South Korea) Kim Eun-jung	1	0	2	0	1	1	0	1	6
(British Columbia) Clancy Grandy 🔨	0	2	0	1	0	0	1	0	4

Sheet 3	1	2	3	4	5	6	7	8	Final
(Ontario) Hailey Armstrong	0	0	1	1	2	1	0	X	5
(Ontario) Breanna Rozon 🔨	0	1	0	0	0	0	2	X	3

Sheet 4	1	2	3	4	5	6	7	8	Final
(New Brunswick) Andrea Kelly	0	0	0	1	0	1	2	2	6
(Manitoba) Team Jones 🔨	0	1	0	0	1	0	0	0	2

==== Draw 17 ====
Saturday, October 1, 7:00 pm

Sheet 1	1	2	3	4	5	6	7	8	Final
(Ontario) Danielle Inglis	5	0	1	0	0	3	1	X	10
(Ontario) Chelsea Brandwood 🔨	0	3	0	3	1	0	0	X	7

Sheet 3	1	2	3	4	5	6	7	8	Final
(Ontario) Krysta Burns	0	2	0	1	0	0	1	0	4
(Ontario) Isabelle Ladouceur 🔨	1	0	1	0	2	1	0	1	6

Sheet 5	1	2	3	4	5	6	7	8	Final
(United States) Delaney Strouse 🔨	2	0	1	0	1	2	0	2	8
(Quebec) Laurie St-Georges	0	2	0	2	0	0	1	0	5

==== Draw 18 ====
Saturday, October 1, 10:00 pm

Sheet 2	1	2	3	4	5	6	7	8	Final
(Ontario) Danielle Inglis	0	2	0	1	1	2	1	X	7
(Ontario) Breanna Rozon 🔨	2	0	1	0	0	0	0	X	3

Sheet 3	1	2	3	4	5	6	7	8	Final
(United States) Delaney Strouse	2	1	0	5	X	X	X	X	8
(Manitoba) Team Jones 🔨	0	0	1	0	X	X	X	X	1

Sheet 4	1	2	3	4	5	6	7	8	Final
(Ontario) Isabelle Ladouceur 🔨	1	0	2	0	0	4	4	X	11
(British Columbia) Clancy Grandy	0	2	0	1	1	0	0	X	4

=== Playoffs ===
Quarterfinals
1	(Switzerland) Silvana Tirinzoni	9
8	(Ontario) Danielle Inglis	6
4	(South Korea) Kim Eun-jung	5
5	(New Brunswick) Andrea Kelly	4
3	(Ontario) Hailey Armstrong	2
6	(Ontario) Isabelle Ladouceur	8
2	(Ontario) Lauren Mann	6
7	(United States) Delaney Strouse	3

Semifinals
1	(Switzerland) Silvana Tirinzoni	6
4	(South Korea) Kim Eun-jung	2
6	(Ontario) Isabelle Ladouceur	9
2	(Ontario) Lauren Mann	4

Final
1	(Switzerland) Silvana Tirinzoni	6
6	(Ontario) Isabelle Ladouceur	5

==== Quarterfinals ====
Sunday, October 2, 11:00 am

Sheet 2	1	2	3	4	5	6	7	8	Final
(Ontario) Hailey Armstrong 🔨	0	2	0	0	0	0	X	X	2
(Ontario) Isabelle Ladouceur	1	0	2	1	2	2	X	X	8

Sheet 3	1	2	3	4	5	6	7	8	Final
(Switzerland) Silvana Tirinzoni 🔨	0	1	0	3	0	2	0	3	9
(Ontario) Danielle Inglis	0	0	3	0	1	0	2	0	6

Sheet 4	1	2	3	4	5	6	7	8	Final
(Ontario) Lauren Mann 🔨	0	3	0	0	1	0	1	1	6
(United States) Delaney Strouse	0	0	1	1	0	1	0	0	3

Sheet 5	1	2	3	4	5	6	7	8	9	Final
(South Korea) Kim Eun-jung	0	1	1	0	0	1	1	0	1	5
(New Brunswick) Andrea Kelly 🔨	0	0	0	1	0	0	0	3	0	4

==== Semifinals ====
Sunday, October 2, 2:00 pm

Sheet 2	1	2	3	4	5	6	7	8	Final
(Switzerland) Silvana Tirinzoni 🔨	1	0	0	0	1	0	4	X	6
(South Korea) Kim Eun-jung	0	0	0	1	0	1	0	X	2

Sheet 3	1	2	3	4	5	6	7	8	Final
(Ontario) Isabelle Ladouceur	0	3	0	3	1	0	2	X	9
(Ontario) Lauren Mann 🔨	1	0	1	0	0	2	0	X	4

==== Final ====
Sunday, October 2, 5:00 pm

Sheet 4	1	2	3	4	5	6	7	8	Final
(Switzerland) Silvana Tirinzoni 🔨	2	0	1	0	1	2	0	0	6
(Ontario) Isabelle Ladouceur	0	2	0	0	0	0	2	1	5
