= Ashley Sippala =

Canadian curler

- Curler
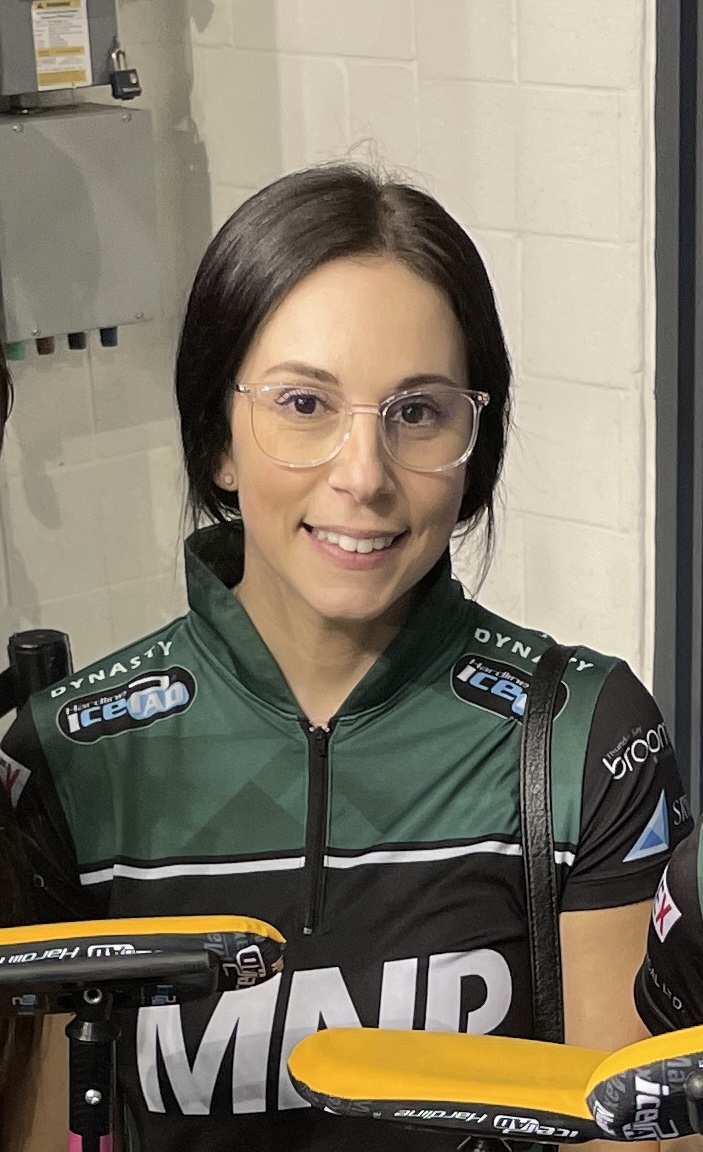
- Sippala at the 2022 Players' Championship
- Born: Ashley Miharija; January 21, 1987 (age 39); Thunder Bay, Ontario, Canada

Team
- Curling club: Fort William CC, Thunder Bay, ON

Curling career
- Member Association: Northern Ontario
- Hearts: 10 (2009, 2010, 2016, 2017, 2020, 2022, 2023, 2024, 2025, 2026)
- Top CTRS ranking: 8th (2021–22)
Medal record
Curling
Representing Northern Ontario
Scotties Tournament of Hearts
Silver medal – second place	2016 Grande Prairie
Silver medal – second place	2022 Thunder Bay
Bronze medal – third place	2023 Kamloops
Representing Ontario
Scotties Tournament of Hearts
Bronze medal – third place	2010 Sault Ste. Marie
Canadian Olympic Curling Trials
Bronze medal – third place	2021 Saskatoon

Ashley Sippala (born Ashley Miharija, January 21, 1987) is a Canadian curler.

== Career ==
Sippala's first major curling event was when she played third for Mike Assad's Northern Ontario team at the 2008 Canadian Mixed Curling Championship. The team finished 6–5.

Sippala skipped Team Northern Ontario at the 2008 Canadian Junior Curling Championships. Her rink of Jessica Williams, Jenna Enge and Sarah Lang finished with an 8–4 record, before losing in a tie-breaker match to Saskatchewan.

The following season, Sippala qualified for her first women's provincial championship. She skipped her Port Arthur Curling Club rink to a 4–5 record at the 2009 Ontario Scotties Tournament of Hearts. She was invited by Krista McCarville to be the team's alternate at the 2009 Scotties Tournament of Hearts.

The following season, she fully joined the McCarville rink, first playing as the team's second. The team won the 2010 Ontario Scotties Tournament of Hearts, and the team went on to win a bronze medal at the 2010 Scotties Tournament of Hearts, losing the semi-final to Prince Edward Island.

The next season, Sippala was promoted to the team's third. She was moved to second in 2015 when Kendra Lilly was added to the team. The team won a silver medal at the 2016 Scotties Tournament of Hearts. They also played in the 2017 Canadian Olympic Curling Trials, finishing 4–4.

Team McCarville won the 2020 Northern Ontario Scotties Tournament of Hearts which qualified them for the 2020 Scotties Tournament of Hearts in Moose Jaw, Saskatchewan. They lost the 3 vs. 4 game to Ontario's Rachel Homan.

The 2021 Northern Ontario provincial playdowns were cancelled due to the COVID-19 pandemic in Ontario. As the 2020 provincial champions, Sippala, with McCarville's team, was given an automatic invitation to represent Northern Ontario at the 2021 Scotties Tournament of Hearts in Calgary. However, the team declined the invitation, citing family and work priorities.

Team McCarville had enough points to qualify for the 2021 Canadian Olympic Curling Pre-Trials. There, they went 5–1 through the round robin, qualifying for the playoffs. The team had two impressive come-from-behind wins in their two playoff games. In their first game against the Mackenzie Zacharias rink, they were down 7–3 heading into the tenth end, but scored four points, then stole a point in the extra end to win the match. In their second game against Jacqueline Harrison, the team gave up five points in the second end to trail 5–1, but rallied back to win the game 9–6. With the win, they qualified for the 2021 Canadian Olympic Curling Trials, held November 20 to 28 in Saskatoon, Saskatchewan. At the Trials, the team went through the round robin with a 4–4 record. This earned them a spot in the second tiebreaker where they defeated Kerri Einarson 4–3. In the semifinal, they lost 8–3 to Jennifer Jones, eliminating them from contention. The 2022 Northern Ontario Scotties Tournament of Hearts was cancelled due to the pandemic and Team McCarville were selected to represent their province at the national women's championship. At the 2022 Scotties Tournament of Hearts, the team went 5–3 through the round robin, enough to qualify for the playoffs. The team then won both of their seeding round games and defeated New Brunswick's Andrea Crawford in the 1 vs. 2 page playoff game to qualify for the final where they faced the Einarson rink. There, they could not keep their momentum going, losing the Scotties final 9–6. They wrapped up their season at the 2022 Players' Championship where they missed the playoffs.

With their success at the Olympic Trials and Scotties, the McCarville rink racked up enough points to qualify for the first Slam of the 2022–23 season, the 2022 National. There, they finished with a 1–3 record, defeating Hollie Duncan in their lone win. The team also qualified for the 2022 Tour Challenge Tier 2 event, winning one game against Denmark's Madeleine Dupont. In December, Team McCarville competed in the Curl Mesabi Classic where they went undefeated until the final, losing 5–3 to the United States' Tabitha Peterson. Next for the team was the 2023 Northern Ontario Scotties Tournament of Hearts. There, they finished first through the round robin with a 5–1 record, earning them a spot in the 1 vs. 2 game. They defeated Jackie McCormick to advance to the final where they topped Krysta Burns 9–4, securing their spot in the 2023 Scotties Tournament of Hearts in Kamloops, British Columbia. At the Hearts, the team topped their pool with a 7–1 record before defeating Nova Scotia's Christina Black in the page seeding game to reach the 1 vs. 2 game for a second straight year. However, they lost both the page playoff and semifinal to Manitoba's Jennifer Jones and Canada's Kerri Einarson respectively, settling for bronze.

For the 2023–24 season, Team McCarville added New Brunswick native Andrea Kelly as their new third, with Sippala, Lilly and Potts rotating on the front-end. The team had immediate success together, winning the 2023 KW Fall Classic by defeating Scotland's Rebecca Morrison. They also had a quarterfinal finish at the North Grenville Women's Fall Curling Classic, losing out to Hailey Armstrong. In the new year, the team again won the 2024 Northern Ontario Scotties Tournament of Hearts with ease, going undefeated to claim their fourth straight title at the event. At the 2024 Scotties Tournament of Hearts in Calgary, the team had mixed results. Sitting 4–3 heading into their last round robin game, they lost to Manitoba's Kaitlyn Lawes 6–5. This created a five-way tie for third with Lawes, British Columbia, Quebec, and Saskatchewan. With tiebreaker games abolished and the first tiebreaker (which was head-to-head between all tied teams) tied as well at 2–2, cumulative last stone draw distance between all the teams was used to decide who would make the playoffs. The McCarville rink finished with a total of 370.3 but would miss the playoffs as the Lawes rink finished first with a 231.6.

Team McCarville reached the final in their first event of the 2024–25 season, losing to Japan's Miyu Ueno at the Mother Club Fall Curling Classic. They next played in the 2024 Stu Sells Toronto Tankard where they were taken out by eventual champion Kim Eun-jung in the quarterfinals. In November 2024, they won the Stu Sells Living Waters Collingwood Classic, going undefeated to claim the title. At the 2025 Northern Ontario Women's Curling Championship, the team finished the round robin in a three-way tie for first place. After beating Robyn Despins in the semifinal, the McCarville rink scored one in the tenth end of the final to defeat Emma Artichuk 6–5, securing their fifth consecutive Northern Ontario women's title. This qualified them for the 2025 Scotties Tournament of Hearts which was played at the Fort William Gardens, adjacent to the Fort William Curling Club they curl out of. There, the team had a disappointing start, losing their first four games. They then won their last four games, however, it was not enough to qualify for the playoffs. A week after the event, the team announced Andrea Kelly stepped away from the team and returned to New Brunswick.

== Personal life ==
Sippala is employed as a lab technician for the Thunder Bay Regional Health Sciences Centre. She is married to Brian Sippala and has two children.
