= 2020 Northern Ontario Men's Provincial Curling Championship =

- Host city: New Liskeard
- Arena: Don Shepherdson Memorial Arena
- Dates: January 29 – February 2
- Winner: Team Jacobs
- Curling club: Community First Curling Club, Sault Ste. Marie
- Skip: Brad Jacobs
- Third: Marc Kennedy
- Second: E. J. Harnden
- Lead: Ryan Harnden
- Finalist: Mike Badiuk

The 2020 Northern Ontario Men's Provincial Curling Championship, the men's curling championship of Northern Ontario was held from January 29 to February 2 at the Don Shepherdson Memorial Arena in New Liskeard. The winning Brad Jacobs rink represented Northern Ontario at the 2020 Tim Hortons Brier in Kingston, Ontario and finished in fourth place. The event was held in conjunction with the 2020 Northern Ontario Scotties Tournament of Hearts, the Northern Ontario women's curling championship. In the final, Team Jacobs defeated Team Badiuk 7–3 and will represent Northern Ontario at the Tim Hortons Brier for a twelfth time.

== Teams ==
Teams are as follows:

Skip	Third	Second	Lead	Alternate	Club(s)
Mike Badiuk	Kristofer Luepen	Chris Briand	Kurtis Byrd	Dylan Johnston	Geraldston Curling Club, Geraldton
Jeffrey Brown	Chris Chartrand	Chris Bowman	Ben Alexander	Steve Decary	North Bay Granite Curling Club, North Bay
Jordan Chandler	Trevor Bonot	Nicholas Bissonnette	Kyle Chandler	Tom Cull	Little Current Curling Club, Little Current & Port Arthur Curling Club, Thunder Bay
Brad Jacobs	Marc Kennedy	E. J. Harnden	Ryan Harnden		Community First Curling Club, Sault Ste. Marie
Nicholas Lemieux	Jacob Reid	Andrew Berg	Dan Lemieux		Community First Curling Club, Sault Ste. Marie
Sandy MacEwan	Dustin Montpellier	Lee Toner	Luc Ouimet		Curl Sudbury, Sudbury
Charlie Robert	Matthew Hunt	Stephen Meunier	Joshua Vanderburg		Community First Curling Club, Sault Ste. Marie
Ryan Sayer	Graehem Sayer	Tyler Langlois	Ryan Forget		Horne Granite Curling Club, New Liskeard

== Round-robin standings ==
Final round-robin standings

Key
Teams to Playoffs
Teams to Tiebreaker

Skip	W	L
Brad Jacobs	7	0
Sandy MacEwan	5	2
Mike Badiuk	4	3
Jordan Chandler	4	3
Ryan Sayer	3	4
Nicholas Lemieux	2	5
Jeffrey Brown	2	5
Charlie Robert	1	6

== Round-robin results ==
All draws are listed in Eastern Time.

=== Draw 1 ===
Wednesday, January 29, 1:30 pm

Sheet A	1	2	3	4	5	6	7	8	9	10	Final
Ryan Sayer	0	1	0	0	0	2	0	1	0	X	4
Brad Jacobs	3	0	0	2	0	0	3	0	2	X	10

Sheet B	1	2	3	4	5	6	7	8	9	10	Final
Nicholas Lemieux	1	1	0	0	1	0	0	2	0	X	5
Sandy MacEwan	0	0	2	0	0	5	1	0	1	X	9

Sheet C	1	2	3	4	5	6	7	8	9	10	Final
Charlie Robert	0	0	0	0	1	0	1	0	1	1	4
Jordan Chandler	1	0	2	1	0	1	0	0	0	0	5

Sheet E	1	2	3	4	5	6	7	8	9	10	Final
Jeffrey Brown	0	0	2	0	1	0	1	1	0	1	6
Mike Badiuk	1	0	0	3	0	0	0	0	1	0	5

=== Draw 2 ===
Wednesday, January 29, 8:00 pm

Sheet A	1	2	3	4	5	6	7	8	9	10	Final
Jordan Chandler	0	0	1	1	0	2	1	0	0	3	8
Nicholas Lemieux	1	2	0	0	1	0	0	3	0	0	7

Sheet C	1	2	3	4	5	6	7	8	9	10	Final
Jeffrey Brown	0	2	0	1	0	1	1	0	1	0	6
Ryan Sayer	2	0	1	0	3	0	0	1	0	1	8

Sheet D	1	2	3	4	5	6	7	8	9	10	Final
Brad Jacobs	2	0	2	0	3	0	3	X	X	X	10
Mike Badiuk	0	1	0	1	0	2	0	X	X	X	4

Sheet E	1	2	3	4	5	6	7	8	9	10	Final
Sandy MacEwan	0	2	5	1	0	1	X	X	X	X	9
Charlie Robert	0	0	0	0	1	0	X	X	X	X	1

=== Draw 3 ===
Thursday, January 30, 10:00 am

Sheet A	1	2	3	4	5	6	7	8	9	10	Final
Mike Badiuk	0	0	1	0	1	0	1	0	X	X	3
Sandy MacEwan	0	2	0	2	0	2	0	2	X	X	8

Sheet C	1	2	3	4	5	6	7	8	9	10	Final
Nicholas Lemieux	0	1	0	1	0	0	X	X	X	X	2
Brad Jacobs	2	0	2	0	3	2	X	X	X	X	9

=== Draw 4 ===
Thursday, January 30, 2:30 pm

Sheet B	1	2	3	4	5	6	7	8	9	10	Final
Charlie Robert	0	1	0	0	1	1	0	3	0	0	6
Jeffrey Brown	1	0	0	2	0	0	2	0	1	1	7

Sheet D	1	2	3	4	5	6	7	8	9	10	11	Final
Ryan Sayer	1	0	0	1	2	0	0	0	0	1	1	6
Jordan Chandler	0	1	0	0	0	3	0	0	1	0	0	5

=== Draw 5 ===
Thursday, January 30, 7:30 pm

Sheet A	1	2	3	4	5	6	7	8	9	10	Final
Brad Jacobs	1	0	3	0	2	0	0	0	2	X	8
Charlie Robert	0	1	0	1	0	1	0	0	0	X	3

Sheet B	1	2	3	4	5	6	7	8	9	10	Final
Jordan Chandler	0	0	2	0	1	0	0	1	0	1	5
Mike Badiuk	1	1	0	2	0	1	1	0	1	0	7

Sheet D	1	2	3	4	5	6	7	8	9	10	Final
Jeffrey Brown	0	1	0	1	0	2	0	X	X	X	4
Nicholas Lemieux	3	0	2	0	2	0	1	X	X	X	8

Sheet E	1	2	3	4	5	6	7	8	9	10	Final
Ryan Sayer	0	0	0	1	0	0	0	0	X	X	1
Sandy MacEwan	1	0	0	0	1	2	2	1	X	X	7

=== Draw 6 ===
Friday, January 31, 9:30 am

Sheet B	1	2	3	4	5	6	7	8	9	10	Final
Sandy MacEwan	0	1	0	1	0	1	0	X	X	X	3
Brad Jacobs	2	0	2	0	2	0	2	X	X	X	8

Sheet C	1	2	3	4	5	6	7	8	9	10	Final
Jordan Chandler	4	0	0	7	0	X	X	X	X	X	11
Jeffrey Brown	0	3	1	0	1	X	X	X	X	X	5

=== Draw 7 ===
Friday, January 31, 2:30 pm

Sheet D	1	2	3	4	5	6	7	8	9	10	Final
Charlie Robert	0	0	2	0	0	2	0	0	X	X	4
Ryan Sayer	1	3	0	0	2	0	1	3	X	X	10

Sheet E	1	2	3	4	5	6	7	8	9	10	Final
Mike Badiuk	0	0	3	1	0	0	0	2	3	X	9
Nicholas Lemieux	0	2	0	0	2	0	0	0	0	X	4

=== Draw 8 ===
Friday, January 31, 7:30 pm

Sheet A	1	2	3	4	5	6	7	8	9	10	11	Final
Sandy MacEwan	0	0	0	1	0	0	0	2	0	3	0	6
Jordan Chandler	0	1	1	0	1	2	0	0	1	0	1	7

Sheet B	1	2	3	4	5	6	7	8	9	10	Final
Mike Badiuk	1	0	3	1	0	2	0	0	1	X	8
Ryan Sayer	0	1	0	0	2	0	1	0	0	X	4

Sheet D	1	2	3	4	5	6	7	8	9	10	Final
Nicholas Lemieux	0	2	0	0	0	X	X	X	X	X	2
Charlie Robert	1	0	0	3	4	X	X	X	X	X	8

Sheet E	1	2	3	4	5	6	7	8	9	10	Final
Brad Jacobs	1	0	3	0	5	0	X	X	X	X	9
Jeffrey Brown	0	1	0	1	0	0	X	X	X	X	2

=== Draw 9 ===
Saturday, February 1, 9:30 am

Sheet A	1	2	3	4	5	6	7	8	9	10	Final
Charlie Robert	1	0	0	2	0	X	X	X	X	X	3
Mike Badiuk	0	2	1	0	5	X	X	X	X	X	8

Sheet D	1	2	3	4	5	6	7	8	9	10	Final
Sandy MacEwan	0	4	1	0	2	X	X	X	X	X	7
Jeffrey Brown	0	0	0	2	0	X	X	X	X	X	2

=== Draw 10 ===
Saturday, February 1, 2:30 pm

Sheet B	1	2	3	4	5	6	7	8	9	10	Final
Ryan Sayer	1	0	0	0	1	0	1	0	0	0	3
Nicholas Lemieux	0	1	0	1	0	1	0	2	1	1	7

Sheet D	1	2	3	4	5	6	7	8	9	10	Final
Jordan Chandler	0	1	0	1	0	0	1	0	X	X	3
Brad Jacobs	1	0	1	0	0	3	0	2	X	X	7

=== Tiebreaker ===
Saturday, February 1, 7:30 pm

Sheet C	1	2	3	4	5	6	7	8	9	10	Final
Mike Badiuk	0	1	0	0	1	0	0	1	0	3	6
Jordan Chandler	0	0	1	1	0	2	0	0	1	0	5

== Playoffs ==
Semifinal			Final
			1	Brad Jacobs	7
2	Sandy MacEwan	5	3	Mike Badiuk	3
3	Mike Badiuk	8

=== Semifinal ===
Sunday, February 2, 9:30 am

Sheet D	1	2	3	4	5	6	7	8	9	10	Final
Sandy MacEwan	3	0	0	1	0	0	0	1	0	X	5
Mike Badiuk	0	2	1	0	0	2	2	0	1	X	8

=== Final ===
Sunday, February 2, 1:30 pm

Sheet D	1	2	3	4	5	6	7	8	9	10	Final
Brad Jacobs	0	2	0	2	0	2	1	0	X	X	7
Mike Badiuk	0	0	2	0	0	0	0	1	X	X	3

2020 Northern Ontario Men's Provincial Curling Championship

Brad Jacobs
12th Northern Ontario Provincial Championship title
