= 2020 Northern Ontario Scotties Tournament of Hearts =

- Host city: New Liskeard, Temiskaming Shores
- Arena: Don Shepherdson Memorial Arena
- Dates: January 29 – February 2
- Winner: Team McCarville
- Curling club: Fort William CC, Thunder Bay
- Skip: Krista McCarville
- Third: Kendra Lilly
- Second: Ashley Sippala
- Lead: Jen Gates
- Coach: Rick Lang
- Finalist: Krysta Burns

The 2020 Northern Ontario Scotties Tournament of Hearts, the Northern Ontario women's curling championship, was held from January 29 – February 2 at the Don Shepherdson Memorial Arena in New Liskeard, Temiskaming Shores. The winning Krista McCarville rink represented Northern Ontario at the 2020 Scotties Tournament of Hearts in Moose Jaw, Saskatchewan and finished in fourth place. The event was held in conjunction with the 2020 Northern Ontario Men's Provincial Curling Championship, the provincial men's championship.

Krista McCarville won her eighth Northern Ontario Scotties Tournament of Hearts by defeating the young Krysta Burns rink in a tight 6–5 final. She and her teammates represented Northern Ontario at the Hearts for the second year in a row. The Burns rink also featured experienced curler Amanda Gates who used to play with the Sudbury-based Tracy Fleury rink.

== Teams ==
The teams are listed as follows:

Skip	Third	Second	Lead	Club(s)
Krysta Burns	Megan Smith	Sara Guy	Amanda Gates	Idylwylde Golf & Country Club
Bella Croisier	Jamie Smith	Emilie Lovitt	Piper Croisier	Idylwylde Golf & Country Club
Camille Daly	Alyssa Denyer	Mikaela Cheslock	Emma Johnson	Curl Sudbury
Abby Deschene	Alissa Begin	Megan St. Amand	Kimberley Headley	Curl Sudbury
Amanda Gebhardt	Amber Sayer	Emma McLean	Stacy Desilets	Horne Granite Curling Club
Laura Johnston	Mackenzie Daley	Laura Forget	Amanda Corkal	North Bay Granite Curling Club
Krista McCarville	Kendra Lilly	Ashley Sippala	Jen Gates	Fort William Curling Club

== Round-robin standings ==
Final round-robin standings

Key
Teams to Playoffs
Teams to Tiebreaker

Skip	W	L
Krista McCarville	6	0
Krysta Burns	5	1
Laura Johnston	3	3
Amanda Gebhardt	3	3
Bella Croisier	2	4
Abby Deschene	2	4
Camille Daly	0	6

== Round-robin results ==
All draws are listed in Eastern Time.

=== Draw 1 ===
Wednesday, January 29, 1:30 pm

Sheet D	1	2	3	4	5	6	7	8	9	10	Final
Krysta Burns 🔨	0	4	0	0	1	3	0	0	1	X	9
Abby Deschene	0	0	1	0	0	0	2	1	0	X	4

=== Draw 2 ===
Wednesday, January 29, 8:00 pm

Sheet B	1	2	3	4	5	6	7	8	9	10	Final
Amanda Gebhardt	3	2	0	0	2	0	1	0	X	X	8
Camille Daly 🔨	0	0	1	1	0	1	0	1	X	X	4

=== Draw 3 ===
Thursday, January 30, 10:00 am

Sheet B	1	2	3	4	5	6	7	8	9	10	Final
Krysta Burns 🔨	0	0	0	5	0	0	0	1	0	4	10
Laura Johnston	0	0	0	0	3	1	0	0	2	0	6

Sheet D	1	2	3	4	5	6	7	8	9	10	Final
Bella Croisier 🔨	0	0	1	0	2	1	2	0	2	0	8
Amanda Gebhardt	0	5	0	2	0	0	0	2	0	1	10

Sheet E	1	2	3	4	5	6	7	8	9	10	Final
Krista McCarville	0	1	0	1	0	0	2	0	4	X	8
Camille Daly 🔨	0	0	0	0	0	1	0	1	0	X	2

=== Draw 4 ===
Thursday, January 30, 2:30 pm

Sheet A	1	2	3	4	5	6	7	8	9	10	Final
Krista McCarville 🔨	2	2	3	0	2	0	X	X	X	X	9
Laura Johnston	0	0	0	2	0	1	X	X	X	X	3

Sheet C	1	2	3	4	5	6	7	8	9	10	Final
Abby Deschene	0	0	0	1	2	0	1	1	0	0	5
Bella Croisier 🔨	0	1	1	0	0	2	0	0	0	2	6

Sheet E	1	2	3	4	5	6	7	8	9	10	Final
Amanda Gebhardt	0	0	0	2	0	0	2	2	0	0	6
Krysta Burns 🔨	0	1	1	0	3	1	0	0	2	1	9

=== Draw 5 ===
Thursday, January 30, 7:30 pm

Sheet C	1	2	3	4	5	6	7	8	9	10	Final
Camille Daly	1	0	0	2	0	1	0	0	0	1	5
Abby Deschene 🔨	0	1	1	0	1	0	0	1	2	0	6

=== Draw 6 ===
Friday, January 31, 9:30 am

Sheet A	1	2	3	4	5	6	7	8	9	10	Final
Laura Johnston 🔨	2	0	0	0	1	1	1	0	2	0	7
Abby Deschene	0	2	1	2	0	0	0	1	0	2	8

Sheet D	1	2	3	4	5	6	7	8	9	10	Final
Krista McCarville 🔨	3	0	0	0	2	0	0	2	2	X	9
Krysta Burns	0	0	2	0	0	1	1	0	0	X	4

Sheet E	1	2	3	4	5	6	7	8	9	10	Final
Camille Daly	0	0	1	0	0	1	0	X	X	X	2
Bella Croisier 🔨	2	1	0	1	1	0	2	X	X	X	7

=== Draw 7 ===
Friday, January 31, 2:30 pm

Sheet A	1	2	3	4	5	6	7	8	9	10	Final
Camille Daly	0	1	0	0	0	2	X	X	X	X	3
Krysta Burns 🔨	2	0	1	2	3	0	X	X	X	X	8

Sheet B	1	2	3	4	5	6	7	8	9	10	Final
Abby Deschene 🔨	1	0	0	0	1	0	0	X	X	X	2
Amanda Gebhardt	0	2	1	0	0	5	1	X	X	X	9

Sheet C	1	2	3	4	5	6	7	8	9	10	Final
Bella Croisier 🔨	0	0	2	0	0	1	0	3	0	0	6
Laura Johnston	0	0	0	2	1	0	1	0	2	1	7

=== Draw 8 ===
Friday, January 31, 7:30 pm

Sheet C	1	2	3	4	5	6	7	8	9	10	Final
Amanda Gebhardt	0	2	0	0	1	1	0	0	X	X	4
Krista McCarville 🔨	1	0	3	2	0	0	3	1	X	X	10

=== Draw 9 ===
Saturday, February 1, 9:30 am

Sheet B	1	2	3	4	5	6	7	8	9	10	Final
Bella Croisier	0	0	2	0	1	0	2	0	1	0	6
Krista McCarville 🔨	1	2	0	1	0	2	0	2	0	1	9

Sheet E	1	2	3	4	5	6	7	8	9	10	Final
Laura Johnston 🔨	0	3	0	0	2	0	2	1	0	3	11
Amanda Gebhardt	1	0	0	1	0	3	0	0	2	0	7

=== Draw 10 ===
Saturday, February 1, 2:30 pm

Sheet A	1	2	3	4	5	6	7	8	9	10	Final
Krysta Burns 🔨	3	0	2	1	0	2	X	X	X	X	8
Bella Croisier	0	0	0	0	1	0	X	X	X	X	1

Sheet C	1	2	3	4	5	6	7	8	9	10	11	Final
Laura Johnston	1	0	3	1	0	1	0	0	2	0	1	9
Camille Daly 🔨	0	1	0	0	2	0	1	3	0	1	0	8

Sheet E	1	2	3	4	5	6	7	8	9	10	Final
Abby Deschene	0	1	0	2	0	0	1	0	X	X	4
Krista McCarville 🔨	2	0	3	0	2	1	0	1	X	X	9

=== Tiebreaker ===
Saturday, February 1, 7:30 pm

Sheet E	1	2	3	4	5	6	7	8	9	10	Final
Laura Johnston 🔨	0	1	0	0	3	0	0	0	2	3	9
Amanda Gebhardt	1	0	2	0	0	1	0	1	0	0	5

== Playoffs ==
Semifinal			Final
			1	Krista McCarville	6
2	Krysta Burns	7	2	Krysta Burns	5
3	Laura Johnston	5

=== Semifinal ===
Sunday, February 2, 9:30 am

Sheet B	1	2	3	4	5	6	7	8	9	10	Final
Krysta Burns 🔨	1	1	0	1	0	0	2	0	0	2	7
Laura Johnston	0	0	1	0	2	0	0	2	0	0	5

=== Final ===
Sunday, February 2, 5:30 pm

Sheet B	1	2	3	4	5	6	7	8	9	10	Final
Krista McCarville 🔨	0	2	0	0	1	0	1	0	2	0	6
Krysta Burns	0	0	1	1	0	1	0	1	0	1	5

2020 Northern Ontario Scotties Tournament of Hearts

Krista McCarville
8th Northern Ontario Women's Championship title
