= 2017 Canadian Junior Curling Championships =

- Host city: Esquimalt, British Columbia
- Arena: Archie Browning Sports Centre; Esquimalt Curling Club
- Dates: January 21–29
- Men's winner: British Columbia
- Curling club: Langley Curling Club, Langley & Royal City Curling Club, New Westminster
- Skip: Tyler Tardi
- Third: Sterling Middleton
- Second: Jordan Tardi
- Lead: Nicholas Meister
- Coach: Paul Tardi
- Finalist: Ontario
- Women's winner: Alberta
- Curling club: Saville Community Sports Centre, Edmonton
- Skip: Kristen Streifel
- Third: Chantele Broderson
- Second: Kate Goodhelpsen
- Lead: Brenna Bilassy
- Coach: Amanda Dawn St. Laurent
- Finalist: Ontario

The 2017 Canadian Junior Curling Championships was held from January 21 to 29 at the Archie Browning Sports Centre and the Esquimalt Curling Club in Esquimalt, British Columbia. The winners represented Canada at the 2017 World Junior Curling Championships in PyeongChang, Korea.

== Men ==
=== Round Robin Standings ===
Key
Teams to Championship Pool
Teams to Tie-Breakers

Pool A	Skip	W	L
Manitoba	JT Ryan	6	0
Prince Edward Island	Tyler Smith	4	2
Alberta	Colton Goller	4	2
New Brunswick	Liam Marin	3	3
Quebec	Vincent Roberge	2	4
Newfoundland and Labrador	Greg Blyde	2	4
Northwest Territories	Sawer Kaeser	0	6

Pool B	Skip	W	L
British Columbia	Tyler Tardi	4	1
Ontario	Matthew Hall	3	2
Northern Ontario	Tanner Horgan	3	2
Nova Scotia	Matthew Manuel	3	2
Saskatchewan	Rylan Kleiter	2	3
Nunavut	Arthur Siksik	0	5

=== Championship Pool Standings ===
After Round Robin Standings

Key
Teams to Playoffs
Teams to Tie-Breakers

Province	Skip	W	L
British Columbia	Tyler Tardi	7	0
Northern Ontario	Tanner Horgan	5	2
Ontario	Matthew Hall	4	3
Manitoba	JT Ryan	4	3
Nova Scotia	Matthew Manuel	3	4
Prince Edward Island	Tyler Smith	2	5
Alberta	Colton Goller	2	5
New Brunswick	Liam Marin	1	6

=== Playoffs ===
Semifinal			Final
			1	British Columbia	9
2	Northern Ontario	6	3	Ontario	7
3	Ontario	7

=== Semifinal ===
Sheet C	1	2	3	4	5	6	7	8	9	10	11	Final
Northern Ontario (Horgan) 🔨	1	0	2	0	0	0	0	1	0	2	0	6
Ontario (Hall)	0	1	0	0	0	0	4	0	1	0	1	7

Player percentages
Northern Ontario		Ontario	
Maxime Blais	82%	David Hart	89%
Nicholas Bissonette	94%	Joey Hart	89%
Jacob Horgan	88%	Jeff Wanless	92%
Tanner Horgan	75%	Matthew Hall	83%
Total	85%	Total	88%

=== Final ===
Sheet C	1	2	3	4	5	6	7	8	9	10	Final
British Columbia (Tardi) 🔨	0	2	0	1	1	0	0	4	0	1	9
Ontario (Hall)	0	0	1	0	0	2	2	0	2	0	7

Player percentages
British Columbia		Ontario	
Nicholas Meister	96%	David Hart	89%
Jordan Tardi	73%	Joey Hart	84%
Sterling Middleton	94%	Jeff Wanless	75%
Tyler Tardi	85%	Matthew Hall	81%
Total	84%	Total	82%

== Women ==
=== Round Robin Standings ===
Final Round Robin Standings

Key
Teams to Championship Pool
Teams to Tie-Breakers

Pool A	Skip	W	L
Alberta	Kristen Streifel	5	1
Saskatchewan	Kaitlyn Jones	4	2
Prince Edward Island	Lauren Lenentine	3	3
Newfoundland and Labrador	Brooke Godsland	3	3
Nova Scotia	Kristin Clarke	3	3
Manitoba	Laura Burtnyk	2	4
Northwest Territories	Zoey Walsh	1	5

Pool B	Skip	W	L
Ontario	Hailey Armstrong	6	0
British Columbia	Corryn Brown	4	2
Quebec	Camille Boisvert	4	2
New Brunswick	Samantha Crook	3	3
Northern Ontario	Krysta Burns	3	3
Nunavut	Sadie Pinksen	1	5
Yukon	Alyssa Meger	0	6

=== Championship Pool Standings ===
After Round Robin Standings

Key
Teams to Playoffs

Province	Skip	W	L
Ontario	Hailey Armstrong	10	0
Northern Ontario	Krysta Burns	7	3
Alberta	Kristen Streifel	7	3
Quebec	Camille Boisvert	6	4
Saskatchewan	Kaitlyn Jones	5	5
British Columbia	Corryn Brown	5	5
Prince Edward Island	Lauren Lenentine	4	6
Nova Scotia	Kristin Clarke	4	6

=== Playoffs ===
Semifinal			Final
			1	Ontario	3
2	Northern Ontario	3	3	Alberta	5
3	Alberta	7

=== Semifinal ===
Sheet C	1	2	3	4	5	6	7	8	9	10	Final
Northern Ontario (Burns) 🔨	0	0	1	0	0	0	0	2	0	X	3
Alberta (Striefel)	0	0	0	1	2	2	1	0	1	X	7

Player percentages
Northern Ontario		Alberta	
Laura Masters	91%	Brenna Bilassy	93%
Sara Guy	64%	Kate Goodhelpsen	78%
Megan Smith	68%	Chantele Broderson	88%
Krysta Burns	72%	Kristen Streifel	84%
Total	74%	Total	85%

=== Final ===
Sheet C	1	2	3	4	5	6	7	8	9	10	Final
Ontario (Armstrong) 🔨	0	0	2	0	0	0	0	1	0	0	3
Alberta (Streifel)	0	0	0	0	0	2	0	0	1	2	5

Player percentages
Ontario		Alberta	
Marcia Richardson	59%	Brenna Bilassy	94%
Lindsay Dubue	64%	Kate Goodhelpsen	80%
Grace Holyoke	76%	Chantele Broderson	80%
Hailey Armstrong	83%	Kristen Streifel	90%
Total	70%	Total	86%

== Qualification ==
=== Ontario ===
The Ontario Junior Provincials were held January 4–8 in Russell, Ontario.

Results:

Men's	W	L
Matthew Hall (Westmount)	7	0
Kieran Scott (Guelph)	5	2
Ryan Hahn (Ottawa Hunt)	4	3
Mac Calwell (Navy)	3	4
Pascal Michaud (Westmount)	3	4
Hazen Enman (Whitby)	2	5
Jordie Lyon-Hatcher (Navan)	2	5
Charlie Richard (Brant)	2	5

Women's	W	L
Hailey Armstrong (Rideau)	5	2
Emma Wallingford (Carleton Heights)	5	2
Courtney Auld (Bayview)	4	3
Chelsea Brandwood (Glendale)	4	3
Jestyn Murphy (Mississaugua)	4	3
Kim Gannon (Granite of West Ottawa)	3	4
Breanna Rozon (Guelph)	2	5
Sabrina Anderson (London)	1	6

Playoffs

- Men's semifinal: Scott 9-7 Hahn
- Men's final: Hall 5-3 Scott
- Women's tiebreakers: Auld 7-5 Brandwood; Auld 12-4 Murphy
- Women's semifinal: Armstrong 11-9 Auld
- Women's final: Armstrong 7-6 Wallingford
