= Megan Smith (curler) =

Canadian curler (born 1997)

- Curler
- Born: October 16, 1997 (age 29); Sudbury, Ontario

Team
- Curling club: KW Granite Club, Waterloo, ON
- Skip: Sherry Middaugh
- Third: Kelly Middaugh
- Second: Emily Middaugh
- Lead: Megan Smith
- Mixed doubles partner: Wesley Forget

Curling career
- Member Association: Northern Ontario
- Hearts: 1 (2021)
- Top CTRS ranking: 25th (2023–24)
Medal record
Women's curling
Representing Ontario
Canada Winter Games
Gold medal – first place	2015 Prince George

Megan Smith (born October 16, 1997) is a Canadian curler from Sudbury, Ontario. She currently plays lead on Team Sherry Middaugh. In 2015, she won the gold medal at the 2015 Canada Winter Games, skipping Team Ontario in women's curling.

== Career ==
Smith made three appearances at the Canadian Junior Curling Championships during her junior career, playing for three different skips in 2016, 2017 and 2019. In 2016, she skipped Team Northern Ontario to a 5–4 ninth-place finish after failing to qualify for the championship round. Smith had her best finish at the 2017 championship playing third for Krysta Burns. The team finished 7–3 through the round robin and championship pools, qualifying for the playoffs as the second seed. Facing Alberta in the semifinal, Team Northern Ontario gave up key steals in the fifth and sixth ends, ultimately losing the game 7–3 and taking home the bronze medal. In 2019, she finished 5–5 with her new team of Kira Brunton, Sara Guy and Kate Sherry. Aside from juniors, Smith skipped Team Ontario in women's curling at the 2015 Canada Winter Games, winning the gold medal at the tournament with a perfect 8–0 record.

Smith is a successful curler at the university sport level as well. Representing Laurentian University, she won the U Sports/Curling Canada University Curling Championships twice in 2017 and 2019 playing for Krysta Burns and Kira Brunton respectively.

Smith reunited with Burns for the 2019–20 season, and they added teammates Sara Guy and Amanda Gates to compete in the 2020 Northern Ontario Scotties Tournament of Hearts. The team did play in one tour event together prior to provincials, the Part II Bistro Ladies Classic where they finished 1–3. Team Burns finished 5–1 through the round robin of provincials defeating Abby Deschene, 9–4, Laura Johnston, 10–6, and Amanda Gebhardt, 9–6, before losing 9–4 to Krista McCarville, following up their last two round robin games with wins over Camille Daly, 8–3, and Bella Croisier, 8–1. They defeated Laura Johnston again in the semifinal 7–5 and met undefeated McCarville in the final. It was a tight final with singles being traded back and forth most of the game before McCarville scored two points in the ninth end to lead 6–4. Team Burns attempted a difficult shot for two on their final shot, but were unsuccessful, the final score being 6–5. Due to the COVID-19 pandemic in Ontario, the 2021 Northern Ontario Scotties Tournament of Hearts was cancelled. As the reigning provincial champions, Team McCarville was given the invitation to represent Northern Ontario at the 2021 Scotties Tournament of Hearts, but they declined due to work and family commitments. Team Burns was then given the invitation as they were the runners-up at the 2020 provincial championship, which they accepted. At the Hearts, they finished with a 2–6 round robin record, defeating Northwest Territories' Kerry Galusha and Yukon's Laura Eby.

== Personal life ==
Smith is currently an education student at Wilfrid Laurier University. She previously studied at Laurentian University.

== Teams ==
Season	Skip	Third	Second	Lead	Alternate
2013–14	Megan Smith	Kira Brunton	Kate Sherry	Emma Johnson	Mikaela Cheslock
2014–15	Megan Smith	Kira Brunton	Kate Sherry	Emma Johnson	Mikaela Cheslock
2015–16	Megan Smith	Kira Brunton	Kate Sherry	Emma Johnson	Mikaela Cheslock
2016–17	Krysta Burns	Megan Smith	Sara Guy	Laura Masters	
2017–18	Krysta Burns	Megan Smith	Sara Guy	Laura Masters	
2018–19	Kira Brunton	Megan Smith	Sara Guy	Kate Sherry	
2019–20	Krysta Burns	Megan Smith	Sara Guy	Amanda Gates	
2020–21	Krysta Burns	Megan Smith	Sara Guy	Amanda Gates	Kira Brunton
2021–22	Mackenzie Kiemele	Katie Ford	Emma McKenzie	Jessica Filipcic	Megan Smith
2022–23	Hailey Armstrong	Megan Smith	Jessica Humphries	Terri Weeks	
2023–24	Chelsea Brandwood	Megan Smith	Brenda Chapman	Keira McLaughlin	
2024–25	Emma Artichuk	Megan Smith	Jamie Smith	Lauren Rajala	Scotia Maltman
2026–27	Sherry Middaugh	Kelly Middaugh	Emily Middaugh	Megan Smith	
