= Krysta Burns =

Canadian curler (born 1996)

- Curler
- Born: June 9, 1996 (age 30); Sudbury, Ontario

Team
- Curling club: Idylwylde G&CC, Sudbury, ON
- Skip: Krysta Burns
- Third: Laura Forget
- Second: Sara Guy
- Lead: Laura Masters

Curling career
- Member Association: Northern Ontario
- Hearts: 1 (2021)
- Top CTRS ranking: 40th (2023–24)

Krysta Burns (born June 9, 1996) is a Canadian curler from Sudbury, Ontario. She currently skips her own team.

== Career ==
Burns made three appearances at the Canadian Junior Curling Championships during her junior career in 2014, 2015 and 2017. In 2014, she skipped her Northern Ontario team to a 4–5 round robin record and in 2015, her team finished 3–6. Burns had her best finish in 2017 as her team qualified for the playoffs with a 7–3 record. Facing Alberta in the semifinal, Team Northern Ontario gave up key steals in the fifth and sixth ends, ultimately losing the game 7–3 and taking home the bronze medal. Also during the 2016–17 season, Burns skipped Laurentian University to a gold medal at the 2017 U Sports/Curling Canada University Curling Championships.

Heading into the 2019–20 season, Burns and her teammates Megan Smith and Sara Guy added Amanda Gates, who previously played for Tracy Fleury, to the team as their lead to compete in the 2020 Northern Ontario Scotties Tournament of Hearts. The team did play in one tour event together prior to provincials, the Part II Bistro Ladies Classic where they finished 1–3. Team Burns finished 5–1 through the round robin of provincials defeating Abby Deschene, 9–4, Laura Johnston, 10–6, and Amanda Gebhardt, 9–6, before losing 9–4 to Krista McCarville, following up their last two round robin games with wins over Camille Daly, 8–3, and Bella Croisier, 8–1. They defeated Laura Johnston again in the semifinal 7–5 and met undefeated McCarville in the final. It was a tight final with singles being traded back and forth most of the game before McCarville scored two points in the ninth end to lead 6–4. Team Burns attempted a difficult shot for two on their final shot, but were unsuccessful, the final score being 6–5. Due to the COVID-19 pandemic in Ontario, the 2021 Northern Ontario Scotties Tournament of Hearts was cancelled. As the reigning provincial champions, Team McCarville was given the invitation to represent Northern Ontario at the 2021 Scotties Tournament of Hearts, but they declined due to work and family commitments. Team Burns was then given the invitation as they were the runners-up at the 2020 provincial championship, which they accepted. At the Hearts, Burns led her team to a 2–6 round robin record, defeating Northwest Territories' Kerry Galusha and Yukon's Laura Eby.

== Personal life ==
Burns is currently a genetics technology student at The Michener Institute. She graduated from Laurentian University.

== Teams ==
Season	Skip	Third	Second	Lead
2013–14	Krysta Burns	Leah Hodgson	Sara Guy	Laura Masters
2014–15	Krysta Burns	Leah Hodgson	Sara Guy	Laura Masters
2015–16	Krysta Burns	Megan Smith	Sara Guy	Laura Masters
2016–17	Krysta Burns	Megan Smith	Sara Guy	Laura Masters
2017–18	Krysta Burns	Megan Smith	Sara Guy	Laura Masters
2019–20	Krysta Burns	Megan Smith	Sara Guy	Amanda Gates
2020–21	Krysta Burns	Megan Smith	Sara Guy	Amanda Gates
2022–23	Krysta Burns	Katie Ford	Sara Guy	Laura Masters
2023–24	Krysta Burns	Jestyn Murphy	Sara Guy	Laura Masters
2024–25	Krysta Burns	Jestyn Murphy	Sara Guy	Laura Masters
2025–26	Krysta Burns	Sara Guy	Laura Masters	Laura Forget
2026–27	Krysta Burns	Laura Forget	Sara Guy	Laura Masters
