= 2012 Ontario Scotties Tournament of Hearts =

- Host city: Kenora, Ontario
- Arena: Kenora CC
- Dates: January 23–29
- Winner: Team Horgan
- Curling club: Idylwylde Golf & Country Club, Sudbury
- Skip: Tracy Horgan
- Third: Jennifer Seabrook
- Second: Jenna Enge
- Lead: Amanda Gates
- Finalist: Rachel Homan

The 2012 Ontario Scotties Tournament of Hearts, Ontario's women's provincial curling championship, was held from January 23 to 29 at the Kenora Curling Club in Kenora, Ontario. The winning team of Tracy Horgan represented Ontario at the 2012 Scotties Tournament of Hearts in Red Deer, Alberta, where they finished with a 4-7 record.

== Qualification Process ==
Ten teams qualified for the provincial tournament through several methods. Four teams qualified from Northern Ontario, two teams qualified from Regions 1&2, two teams qualified from regions 3&4 and two teams qualified from the Challenge Round.

Teams	Qualification method	Berths	Qualifying team
Team 1	Northern Ontario provincial 1st-place finish	1	Krista McCarville
Team 2	Northern Ontario provincial 2nd-place finish	1	Marlo Dahl
Team 3	Northern Ontario provincial 3rd-place finish	1	Tracy Horgan
Team 4	Northern Ontario provincial 4th-place finish	1	Laura Pickering
Teams 5 & 6	Regions 1 & 2 Qualifiers	2	Cathy Auld; Rachel Homan
Teams 7 & 8	Regions 3 & 4 Qualifiers	2	Allison Nimik; Kathy Brown
Teams 9 & 10	Challenge Round Qualifiers	2	Sherry Middaugh; Jenn Hanna

== Teams ==
Skip	Third	Second	Lead	Alternate	Club(s)
Cathy Auld	Janet Murphy	Stephanie Gray	Melissa Foster	Mary Chilvers	Mississaugua Golf & Country Club, Mississauga
Kathy Brown	Janet Langevin	Abbie Darnley	Margie Hewitt		King Curling Club, Schomberg
Marlo Dahl	Rhonda Skillen	Oye Sem Won-Briand	Jessica Williams	Karlee Jones	Port Arthur Curling Club, Thunder Bay
Jenn Hanna	Pascale Letendre	Stephanie Hanna	Trish Scharf		Ottawa Curling Club, Ottawa
Rachel Homan	Emma Miskew	Alison Kreviazuk	Lisa Weagle		Ottawa Curling Club, Ottawa
Tracy Horgan	Jennifer Seabrook	Jenna Enge	Amanda Gates		Idylwylde Golf & Country Club, Sudbury
Krista McCarville	Ashley Miharija	Sarah Lang	Liz Kingston	Kari Lavoie	Fort William Curling Club, Thunder Bay
Sherry Middaugh	Jo-Ann Rizzo	Lee Merklinger	Leigh Armstrong		Coldwater and District Curling Club, Coldwater
Allison Nimik	Lori Eddy	Kimberly Tuck	Julie Columbus		St. Thomas Curling Club, St. Thomas
Laura Pickering	Mackenzie Daley	JoAnne Comé	Allison McLeod		North Bay Granite Curling Club, North Bay

== Standings ==
Skip (Club)	W	L	PF	PA	Ends Won	Ends Lost	Blank Ends	Stolen Ends
Rachel Homan (Ottawa)	9	0	65	39	40	32	9	11
Tracy Horgan (Idylwylde)	7	2	60	42	38	29	12	11
Sherry Middaugh (Coldwater)	6	3	55	47	37	34	17	11
Krista McCarville (Fort William)	6	3	57	46	34	32	14	10
Cathy Auld (Mississaugua)	5	4	59	45	34	33	14	9
Marlo Dahl (Port Arthur)	5	4	60	49	38	32	18	10
Kathy Brown (King)	3	6	42	60	31	35	15	7
Allison Nimik (St. Thomas)	2	7	40	56	29	37	10	2
Jenn Hanna (Ottawa)	2	7	52	59	34	40	12	8
Laura Pickering (North Bay Granite)	0	9	29	78	22	38	13	0

== Results ==
=== Draw 1 ===
January 23, 7:00 PM CT

Sheet A	1	2	3	4	5	6	7	8	9	10	Final
Pickering	0	1	0	1	0	2	0	0	X	X	4
Middaugh	1	0	3	0	1	0	1	4	X	X	10

Sheet B	1	2	3	4	5	6	7	8	9	10	Final
Brown	2	0	0	1	0	1	1	1	0	1	7
Nimik	0	0	2	0	1	0	0	0	1	0	4

Sheet C	1	2	3	4	5	6	7	8	9	10	Final
Auld	0	0	2	0	0	3	0	1	2	X	8
Dahl	0	1	0	1	0	0	1	0	0	X	3

Sheet D	1	2	3	4	5	6	7	8	9	10	11	Final
Horgan	1	1	0	1	0	0	2	0	0	2	0	7
Hanna	0	0	2	0	0	2	0	2	1	0	2	9

Sheet E	1	2	3	4	5	6	7	8	9	10	Final
Homan	1	1	0	0	2	2	0	1	0	X	7
McCarville	0	0	2	0	0	0	1	0	1	X	4

=== Draw 2 ===
January 24, 2:00 PM CT

Sheet A	1	2	3	4	5	6	7	8	9	10	Final
Brown 🔨	2	0	1	0	2	2	0	0	0	X	7
Homan	0	3	0	3	0	0	2	2	1	X	11

Sheet B	1	2	3	4	5	6	7	8	9	10	Final
Middaugh 🔨	0	2	0	1	0	0	0	2	0	0	5
Dahl	2	0	1	0	0	1	2	0	1	1	8

Sheet C	1	2	3	4	5	6	7	8	9	10	Final
Pickering	0	1	0	1	0	0	0	X	X	X	2
Hanna 🔨	4	0	2	0	2	0	2	X	X	X	10

Sheet D	1	2	3	4	5	6	7	8	9	10	Final
Nimik 🔨	0	0	1	1	0	2	0	0	0	1	5
McCarville	0	0	0	0	2	0	2	1	1	0	6

Sheet E	1	2	3	4	5	6	7	8	9	10	Final
Auld 🔨	0	0	1	0	2	0	0	0	0	X	3
Horgan	0	1	0	2	0	1	0	1	3	X	8

=== Draw 3 ===
January 24, 7:00 PM CT

Sheet A	1	2	3	4	5	6	7	8	9	10	Final
Auld	0	1	0	2	1	0	2	0	X	X	6
Nimik	0	0	1	0	0	0	0	1	X	X	2

Sheet B	1	2	3	4	5	6	7	8	9	10	Final
Hanna	0	0	1	0	2	0	0	X	X	X	3
McCarville	1	1	0	1	0	1	5	X	X	X	9

Sheet C	1	2	3	4	5	6	7	8	9	10	Final
Horgan	1	0	2	1	0	2	0	0	1	X	7
Middaugh	0	1	0	0	1	0	0	1	0	X	3

Sheet D	1	2	3	4	5	6	7	8	9	10	Final
Homan	0	0	3	0	0	2	1	0	0	1	7
Dahl	0	1	0	1	1	0	0	1	2	0	6

Sheet E	1	2	3	4	5	6	7	8	9	10	Final
Brown	1	0	1	1	0	0	0	1	0	1	5
Pickering	0	1	0	0	1	0	0	0	2	0	4

=== Draw 4 ===
January 25, 2:00 PM CT

Sheet A	1	2	3	4	5	6	7	8	9	10	11	Final
Middaugh	0	0	0	2	1	0	1	1	1	0	1	7
Hanna	2	0	2	0	0	1	0	0	0	1	0	6

Sheet B	1	2	3	4	5	6	7	8	9	10	Final
Auld	2	1	0	1	0	3	X	X	X	X	7
Brown	0	0	1	0	1	0	X	X	X	X	2

Sheet C	1	2	3	4	5	6	7	8	9	10	Final
Nimik	0	0	0	0	1	0	X	X	X	X	1
Homan	0	0	1	2	0	4	X	X	X	X	7

Sheet D	1	2	3	4	5	6	7	8	9	10	Final
Pickering	1	0	0	0	2	0	0	0	X	X	3
Horgan	0	3	0	0	0	3	1	1	X	X	8

Sheet E	1	2	3	4	5	6	7	8	9	10	Final
McCarville	0	0	0	1	1	0	0	2	0	1	5
Dahl	0	0	1	0	0	0	1	0	2	0	4

=== Draw 5 ===
January 25, 7:00 PM CT

Sheet A	1	2	3	4	5	6	7	8	9	10	Final
Dahl	0	2	0	0	0	0	2	3	X	X	7
Pickering	0	0	0	0	0	0	0	0	X	X	0

Sheet B	1	2	3	4	5	6	7	8	9	10	Final
Horgan	0	1	0	1	0	1	0	0	X	X	3
Homan	2	0	2	0	1	0	0	4	X	X	9

Sheet C	1	2	3	4	5	6	7	8	9	10	Final
Brown	0	0	3	0	0	0	X	X	X	X	3
McCarville	1	1	0	3	3	2	X	X	X	X	10

Sheet D	1	2	3	4	5	6	7	8	9	10	Final
Middaugh	2	0	2	0	0	1	1	0	1	X	7
Nimik	0	1	0	1	0	0	0	1	0	X	3

Sheet E	1	2	3	4	5	6	7	8	9	10	11	Final
Hanna	0	0	1	2	0	1	0	0	0	1	0	5
Auld	0	0	0	0	2	0	0	1	2	0	2	7

=== Draw 6 ===
January 26, 2:00 PM CT

Sheet A	1	2	3	4	5	6	7	8	9	10	Final
Horgan	0	3	0	2	0	3	0	1	X	X	9
McCarville	0	0	1	0	2	0	0	0	X	X	3

Sheet B	1	2	3	4	5	6	7	8	9	10	Final
Pickering	0	1	0	0	2	0	1	0	X	X	4
Auld	3	0	0	2	0	4	0	3	X	X	12

Sheet C	1	2	3	4	5	6	7	8	9	10	Final
Hanna	0	0	0	1	0	1	2	0	1	0	5
Nimik	0	1	3	0	1	0	0	1	0	1	7

Sheet D	1	2	3	4	5	6	7	8	9	10	Final
Dahl	1	0	2	0	2	0	1	0	2	2	10
Brown	0	2	0	0	0	2	0	2	0	0	6

Sheet E	1	2	3	4	5	6	7	8	9	10	Final
Middaugh	1	3	0	0	1	0	0	1	0	0	6
Homan	0	0	1	2	0	1	1	0	0	2	7

=== Draw 7 ===
January 26, 7:00 PM CT

Sheet A	1	2	3	4	5	6	7	8	9	10	Final
Hanna	0	3	0	1	0	0	0	1	0	0	5
Brown	0	0	2	0	1	0	1	0	2	1	7

Sheet B	1	2	3	4	5	6	7	8	9	10	Final
McCarville	1	0	0	0	2	0	2	0	0	0	5
Middaugh	0	3	0	0	0	2	0	1	0	1	7

Sheet C	1	2	3	4	5	6	7	8	9	10	Final
Dahl	0	1	0	1	0	2	0	2	0	0	6
Horgan	0	0	2	0	2	0	2	0	0	1	7

Sheet D	1	2	3	4	5	6	7	8	9	10	Final
Auld	0	0	0	1	0	1	1	1	1	0	5
Homan	0	1	3	0	2	0	0	0	0	1	7

Sheet E	1	2	3	4	5	6	7	8	9	10	Final
Pickering	0	1	0	1	0	1	0	X	X	X	3
Nimik	1	0	6	0	1	0	3	X	X	X	11

=== Draw 8 ===
January 27, 2:00 PM CT

Sheet A	1	2	3	4	5	6	7	8	9	10	Final
Nimik	0	1	0	1	0	1	0	1	1	0	5
Dahl	0	0	2	0	3	0	2	0	0	1	8

Sheet B	1	2	3	4	5	6	7	8	9	10	Final
Homan	0	0	1	1	0	1	0	1	1	X	5
Hanna	1	1	0	0	1	0	0	0	0	X	3

Sheet C	1	2	3	4	5	6	7	8	9	10	11	Final
Middaugh	0	0	2	0	2	0	1	1	0	1	1	8
Auld	2	1	0	2	0	1	0	0	1	0	0	7

Sheet D	1	2	3	4	5	6	7	8	9	10	Final
McCarville	2	1	0	3	0	3	0	X	X	X	9
Pickering	0	0	2	0	1	0	1	X	X	X	4

Sheet E	1	2	3	4	5	6	7	8	9	10	Final
Horgan	0	0	0	1	0	2	3	1	0	X	7
Brown	0	2	1	0	1	0	0	0	1	X	5

=== Draw 9 ===
January 27, 7:00 PM CT

Sheet A	1	2	3	4	5	6	7	8	9	10	Final
McCarville	0	0	0	0	2	0	1	0	2	1	6
Auld	1	0	0	0	0	1	0	2	0	0	4

Sheet B	1	2	3	4	5	6	7	8	9	10	Final
Nimik	0	0	1	0	1	0	X	X	X	X	2
Horgan	3	1	0	1	0	1	X	X	X	X	6

Sheet C	1	2	3	4	5	6	7	8	9	10	Final
Homan	0	1	0	1	0	1	0	2	0	1	6
Pickering	1	0	1	0	1	0	1	0	0	0	4

Sheet D	1	2	3	4	5	6	7	8	9	10	11	Final
Brown	0	0	0	0	0	0	0	0	1	0	0	1
Middaugh	0	0	0	0	0	0	0	0	0	1	1	2

Sheet E	1	2	3	4	5	6	7	8	9	10	11	Final
Dahl	0	0	3	1	0	0	0	2	0	0	2	8
Hanna	0	1	0	0	0	1	2	0	1	1	0	6

== Playoffs ==
Page playoff system
1	Rachel Homan	5
2	Tracy Horgan	3
3	Sherry Middaugh	5
4	Krista McCarville	1

Semifinal
2	Tracy Horgan	7
3	Sherry Middaugh	3

Final
1	Rachel Homan	6
2	Tracy Horgan	8

=== 1 vs. 2 ===
January 28, 2:00 PM CT

Sheet A	1	2	3	4	5	6	7	8	9	10	Final
Homan 🔨	0	0	1	0	0	1	0	1	1	1	5
Horgan	0	0	0	0	3	0	0	0	0	0	3

=== 3 vs. 4 ===
January 28, 7:00 PM CT

Sheet A	1	2	3	4	5	6	7	8	9	10	Final
Middaugh 🔨	1	0	0	0	0	0	0	2	2	X	5
McCarville	0	0	0	0	0	0	1	0	0	X	1

=== Semifinal ===
January 29, 9:30 AM CT

Sheet A	1	2	3	4	5	6	7	8	9	10	Final
Horgan	0	2	1	0	2	1	0	0	1	X	7
Middaugh	0	0	0	2	0	0	0	1	0	X	3

=== Final ===
January 29, 2:00 PM CT

Sheet A	1	2	3	4	5	6	7	8	9	10	Final
Homan 🔨	1	0	2	1	1	0	1	0	0	0	6
Horgan	0	2	0	0	0	2	0	1	0	3	8

2012 Ontario Scotties Tournament of Hearts

Tracy Horgan
1st Ontario Provincial Championship title

== Qualification ==
Southern Ontario zones run from December 9 to 11, 2011, and December 16 to 19, 2011. Two teams from each zone qualify to two regional tournaments, and two teams from each of the two tournaments qualify to the provincials. Two additional teams qualify out of a second chance qualifier.

The Northern Ontario provincial championship were held from December 8 to 11 at the Copper Cliff Curling Club in Copper Cliff, Ontario. Four teams qualified out of the Northern Ontario championship.

Regional Qualifiers In Bold

=== Southern Ontario Zone Qualification ===
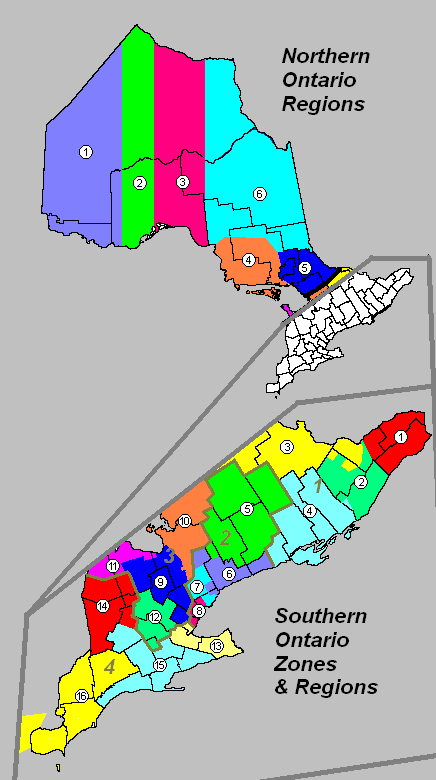
Zone Map

==== Zone 1 ====
December 10–11 at the RCMP Curling Club, Ottawa

- **Jenn Hanna (Ottawa Curling)**
- **Rachel Homan (Ottawa Curling)**
- Jennifer Harvey (Cornwall)

==== Zone 2 ====
December 9–11 at the RCMP Curling Club, Ottawa

- **Tracy Samaan (Rideau)**
- **Christine McCrady (Rideau)**
- Lauren Mann (Rideau)
- Laura Payne (Rideau)
- Marla Weinberger (Rideau)

==== Zone 3 ====
December 9–11 at the Pakenham Curling Club, Pakenham

As there were no teams entered in this zone, seeds 3A and 3B will be filled by seeds from Zone 7.

==== Zone 4 ====
December 16–18 at the Brighton & District Curling Club, Brighton

- **Lisa Farnell (Loonie)**

As there was only one team entered in this zone, Farnell will be seeded as seed 4A, and seed 4B will be filled by a seed from Zone 7.

==== Zone 5 ====
December 17–18 at the Beaverton Curling Club, Beaverton

- **Julie O'Neill (Lindsay)**
- **Jaimee Gardner (Peterborough C.C.)**
- Angie Melaney (Lakefield)

==== Zone 6 ====
December 10–12 at the Sutton Curling Club, Sutton West

- **Susan McKnight (Uxbridge)**
- **Lesley Pyne (Annandale)**

==== Zone 7 ====
December 17–18 at the Bayview Golf & Country Club, Thornhill

- **Kirsten Wall (Donalda)**
- **Julie Hastings (Bayview)**
- **Shawnessy Johnson (East York) (Zone 3A Qualifier)**
- **Colleen Madonia (Thornhill) (Zone 3B Qualifier)**
- **Christine Anderson (Leaside) (Zone 4B Qualifier)**
- Joanne Heffernan (Bayview)
- Danielle Bourque (Leaside)
- Jan Carwardine (Leaside)

==== Zone 8 ====
December 17–18 at the Oakville Curling Club, Oakville

- **Cathy Auld (Mississaugua)**
- **Ashley Waye (Royals)**
- Kelly Cochrane (High Park)

==== Zone 9 ====
December 10–11 at the King Curling Club, Schomberg

- **Kathy Brown (King)**
- **Kristy Russell (Shelburne)**
- Meagan Tervail (Brampton)
- Julie Reddick (King)
- Alison Goring (Milton)

==== Zone 10 ====
December 10–11 at the Barrie Curling Club, Barrie

- **Sherry Middaugh (Coldwater)**
- **Heather Marshall (Orillia)**
- **Sarah Picton (Stroud) (Zone 11B Qualifier)**
- Lynne Middaugh (Orillia)
- Kristeen Wilson (Midland)
- Julie Truscott (Parry Sound)

==== Zone 11 ====
December 16–18 at the Blue Water Curling Club, Owen Sound

- **Leslie Bishop (Port Elgin)**

As there was only one team entered in this zone, Bishop will be seeded as seed 11A, and seed 11B will be filled by a seed from Zone 10.

==== Zone 12 ====
December 9–11 at the Elmira & District Curling Club, Elmira

- **Suzanne Frick (Guelph Curling)**
- **Karen Sagle (Guelph Curling)**
- **Sheri Smeltzer (Fergus)** (Zone 14A Qualifier)
- **Anne Dunn (Galt Country)** (Zone 14B Qualifier)
- Tracey Jones (Arthur)
- Courtney Hodgson (Guelph Curling)
- Janet McGhee (Guelph Curling)
- Kathy Ryan (K–W Granite)

==== Zone 13 ====
December 17–18 at the Hamilton Victoria Club, Hamilton

- **Katie Lindsay (Welland)**
- **Chrissy Cadorin (Glendale)**
- Lorna Howarth (Hamilton Victoria)
- Sharon Lederman (Hamilton Victoria)
- Michelle Fletcher (Burlington Curling)

==== Zone 14 ====
December 16–18 at the Harriston Curling Club, Harriston

As there were no teams entered in this zone, seeds 14A and 14B will be filled by seeds from Zone 12.

==== Zone 15 ====
December 18 at the Woodstock Curling Club, Woodstock

- **Allison Nimik (St. Thomas)**
- **Dianne Dykstra (Brant)**
- Heather Carr Olmstead (St. Thomas)

==== Zone 16 ====
December 10 at the Chatham Granite Club, Chatham

- **Lisa Moore (Highland)**
- **Marika Bakewell (Highland)**
- Katie Lambert (Ilderton)

=== Regions 1 & 2 ===
January 6–8, Gananoque Curling Club, Gananoque

A side
1A	**Jenn Hanna**
5B	Jaimee Gardner
2A	Tracy Samaan
6B	**Lesley Pyne**
3A	Shawnessy Johnson
7B	**Julie Hastings**
4A	**Lisa Farnell**
8B	Ashley Waye
5A	Julie O'Neill
1B	**Rachel Homan**
6A	**Susan McKnight**
2B	Christine McCrady
7A	**Kirsten Wall**
3B	Colleen Madonia
8A	**Cathy Auld**
4B	Christine Anderson

Quarterfinal
1A	**Jenn Hanna**
6B	Lesley Pyne
7B	**Julie Hastings**
4A	Lisa Farnell
1B	**Rachel Homan**
6A	Susan McKnight
7A	Kirsten Wall
8A	**Cathy Auld**

Semifinal
1A	**Jenn Hanna**
7B	Julie Hastings
1B	Rachel Homan
8A	**Cathy Auld**

Final
1A	Jenn Hanna	2
8A	**Cathy Auld**	**7**

B Side (Top half)
5B	**Jaimee Gardner**
2A	Tracy Samaan
3A	**Shawnessy Johnson**
8B	Ashley Waye

Semifinals
7A	**Kirsten Wall**
5B	Jaimee Gardner
6A	Susan McKnight
3A	**Shawnessy Johnson**

Finals
7A	**Kirsten Wall**
3A	Shawnessy Johnson

B Side (Bottom half)
5A	Julie O'Neill
2B	**Christine McCrady**
3B	**Colleen Madonia**
4B	Christine Anderson

Semifinals
4A	Lisa Farnell
2B	**Christine McCrady**
3B	Colleen Madonia
6B	**Lesley Pyne**

Finals
2B	Christine McCrady
6B	**Lesley Pyne**

B Side		Semifinal		**Final**
				1A	Jenn Hanna	5
7A	**Kirsten Wall**			1B	**Rachel Homan**	**10**
7B	Julie Hastings	7A	Kirsten Wall
6B	Lesley Pyne	1B	**Rachel Homan**
1B	**Rachel Homan**

=== Regions 3 & 4 ===
January 6–8, Penetanguishene Curling Club, Penetanguishene

A Final
9A	**Kathy Brown**
13B	Chrissy Cadorin
10A	**Sherry Middaugh**
14B	Anne Dunn
11A	**Leslie Bishop**
15B	Dianne Dykstra
12A	Suzanne Frick
16B	**Marika Bakewell**
13A	**Katie Lindsay**
9B	Kristy Russell
14A	**Sheri Smeltzer**
10B	Heather Marshall
15A	**Allison Nimik**
11B	Sarah Picton
16A	Lisa Moore
12B	**Karen Sagle**

Quarterfinal
9A	**Kathy Brown**
10A	Sherry Middaugh
11A	Leslie Bishop
16B	**Marika Bakewell**
13A	**Katie Lindsay**
14A	Sheri Smeltzer
15A	**Allison Nimik**
12B	Karen Sagle

Semifinal
9A	Kathy Brown
16B	**Marika Bakewell**
13A	Katie Lindsay
15A	**Allison Nimik**

Final
16B	Marika Bakewell
15A	**Allison Nimik**

B Side (Top half)
13B	**Chrissy Cadorin**
14B	Anne Dunn
15B	Dianne Dykstra
12A	**Suzanne Frick**

Semifinals
12B	Karen Sagle
13B	**Chrissy Cadorin**
12A	**Suzanne Frick**
14A	Sheri Smeltzer

Finals
13B	Chrissy Cadorin
12A	**Suzanne Frick**

B Side (Bottom half)
9B	Kristy Russell
10B	**Heather Marshall**
11B	Sarah Picton
16A	**Lisa Moore**

Semifinals
11A	Leslie Bishop
10B	**Heather Marshall**
16A	Lisa Moore
10A	**Sherry Middaugh**

Finals
10B	**Heather Marshall**
10A	Sherry Middaugh

B Side		Semifinal		Final
				16B	Marika Bakewell
12A	Suzanne Frick			9A	**Kathy Brown**
9A	**Kathy Brown**	9A	**Kathy Brown**
10B	**Heather Marshall**	10B	Heather Marshall
13A	Katie Lindsay

=== Challenge Round ===
January 13–15, Oshawa Curling Club, Oshawa

A Final
**Sherry Middaugh**	**8**
Angie Melaney	5
**Leslie Bishop**	**8**
Tracy Samaan	7
**Kristy Russell**	**8**
Lauren Mann	3
**Susan McKnight**	**8**
Kelly Cochrane	5
A5	**Marika Bakewell**	**9**
A5	Cheryl McPherson	7
A6	**Julie Hastings**	**7**
A6	Julie Reddick	6
A7	**Kirsten Wall**	**6**
A7	Chrissy Cadorin	3
A8	**Jenn Hanna**	**9**
A8	Heather Carr Olmstead	2

Quarterfinal
A1	**Sherry Middaugh**	**11**
A2	Leslie Bishop	5
A3	**Kristy Russell**	**6**
A4	Susan McKnight	5
A5	Marika Bakewell	4
A6	**Julie Hastings**	**8**
A7	**Kirsten Wall**	**10**
A8	Jenn Hanna	3

Semifinal
A9	**Sherry Middaugh**	**7**
A10	Kristy Russell	1
A11	**Julie Hastings**	**7**
A12	Kirsten Wall	2

Final
A13	**Sherry Middaugh**	**7**
A14	Julie Hastings	6

B Side (Top half)
A1	Angie Melaney	**8**
A2	Tracy Samaan	2
A3	Lauren Mann	**8**
A4	Kelly Cochrane	6

Semifinals
A12	**Jenn Hanna**	**7**
B1	Angie Melaney	6
A11	Marika Bakewell	7
B2	**Lauren Mann**	**8**

Finals
B5	**Jenn Hanna**	**6**
B6	Lauren Mann	4

B Side (Bottom half)
A5	Cheryl McPherson	3
A6	**Julie Reddick**	**6**
A7	Chrissy Cadorin	5
A8	**Heather Carr Olmstead**	**7**

Semifinals
A10	Susan McKnight	3
B3	**Julie Reddick**	**8**
A9	Leslie Bishop	4
B4	**Heather Carr Olmstead**	**7**

Finals
B7	**Julie Reddick**	**11**
B8	Heather Carr Olmstead	6

B Side			Semifinal			**Final**
						A15	Julie Hastings	1
A13	Kristy Russell	5				B13	**Jenn Hanna**	**10**
B9	**Jenn Hanna**	**9**	B11	**Jenn Hanna**	**9**
A14	**Kirsten Wall**	**7**	B12	Kirsten Wall	3
B10	Julie Reddick	6

== Northern Ontario Provincials ==
The Northern Ontario provincials were held from December 8 to 11, 2011, at the Copper Cliff Curling Club in Copper Cliff, Ontario. The top four teams advanced to the provincial playoffs.

=== Teams ===
Skip	Third	Second	Lead	Alternate	Club(s)
Marlo Dahl	Rhonda Skillen	Oye Sem Won-Briand	Jessica Williams		Port Arthur Curling Club
Tracy Horgan	Jennifer Seabrook	Jenna Enge	Amanda Gates		Idlywylde Golf & Curling Club
Ashley Kallos	Angela Lee-Wiwcharyk	Alissa Begin	Andrea Milionis		Port Arthur Curling Club
Sandra Lahti	Amanda Mahaffy	Jamie Ward	Renee Higgins	Roxanne Barbeau	Copper Cliff Curling Club
Louise Logan	Margaret McLaughlin	Amanda Corkal	Monique Schryer		Copper Cliff Curling Club
Krista McCarville	Ahsley Miharija	Sarah Lang	Liz Kingston	Kari Lavoie	Fort William Curling Club
Laura Pickering	Mackenzie Daley	JoAnne Comé	Allison McLeod		North Bay Granite Curling Club

=== Standings ===
Skip (Club)	W	L
Krista McCarville (Fort William)	5	1
Marlo Dahl (Port Arthur)	5	1
Tracy Horgan (Idlywylde)	4	2
Laura Pickering (North Bay Granite)	3	3
Louise Logan (Copper Cliff)	2	4
Ashley Kallos (Port Arthur)	2	4
Sandra Lahti (Copper Cliff)	0	6

=== Results ===
==== Draw 1 ====
December 9, 10:30 AM ET

Sheet C	1	2	3	4	5	6	7	8	9	10	Final
McCarville	0	1	0	2	1	0	0	1	1	0	6
Pickering 🔨	1	0	2	0	0	3	1	0	0	1	8

Sheet D	1	2	3	4	5	6	7	8	9	10	Final
Horgan 🔨	2	0	0	1	4	0	4	X	X	X	11
Logan	0	1	1	0	0	2	0	X	X	X	4

Sheet F	1	2	3	4	5	6	7	8	9	10	Final
Dahl	0	0	0	1	2	0	1	0	2	X	6
Kallos 🔨	1	0	0	0	0	0	0	3	0	X	4

==== Draw 2 ====
December 9, 3:00 PM ET

Sheet C	1	2	3	4	5	6	7	8	9	10	Final
Logan 🔨	1	0	3	0	2	1	0	1	2	X	10
Kallos	0	0	0	2	0	0	2	0	0	X	4

Sheet D	1	2	3	4	5	6	7	8	9	10	Final
Pickering 🔨	1	0	1	0	0	2	0	1	1	0	6
Dahl	0	1	0	1	2	0	4	0	0	1	9

Sheet F	1	2	3	4	5	6	7	8	9	10	Final
Lahti	0	0	0	0	1	0	1	0	X	X	2
Horgan 🔨	1	2	2	1	0	1	0	4	X	X	11

==== Draw 3 ====
December 9, 7:30 PM ET

Sheet C	1	2	3	4	5	6	7	8	9	10	Final
Horgan	0	0	1	0	0	1	0	1	0	X	3
Dahl 🔨	1	1	0	0	1	0	2	0	1	X	6

Sheet D	1	2	3	4	5	6	7	8	9	10	Final
Kallos	0	1	0	2	0	1	3	0	0	X	2
McCarville 🔨	3	0	3	0	1	0	0	2	2	X	11

Sheet E	1	2	3	4	5	6	7	8	9	10	Final
Lahti 🔨	1	0	1	0	0	3	0	0	1	0	6
Logan	0	1	0	1	4	0	1	0	0	1	8

==== Draw 4 ====
December 10, 9:30 AM ET

Sheet C	1	2	3	4	5	6	7	8	9	10	Final
McCarville	2	0	4	3	0	0	X	X	X	X	9
Lahti 🔨	0	1	0	0	2	1	X	X	X	X	4

Sheet D	1	2	3	4	5	6	7	8	9	10	Final
Logan	0	0	0	1	0	X	X	X	X	X	1
Dahl 🔨	1	0	2	0	5	X	X	X	X	X	8

Sheet E	1	2	3	4	5	6	7	8	9	10	Final
Kallos	4	0	0	3	0	4	X	X	X	X	11
Pickering 🔨	0	0	2	0	1	0	X	X	X	X	3

==== Draw 5 ====
December 10, 2:30 PM ET

Sheet D	1	2	3	4	5	6	7	8	9	10	Final
Lahti	0	0	0	1	0	0	X	X	X	X	1
Kallos 🔨	3	0	1	0	4	1	X	X	X	X	9

Sheet E	1	2	3	4	5	6	7	8	9	10	Final
Dahl 🔨	2	0	0	2	1	0	0	X	X	X	5
McCarville	0	3	3	0	0	3	2	X	X	X	11

Sheet F	1	2	3	4	5	6	7	8	9	10	Final
Pickering 🔨	0	0	1	0	0	X	X	X	X	X	1
Horgan	3	1	0	2	6	X	X	X	X	X	12

==== Draw 6 ====
December 10, 7:30 PM ET

Sheet C	1	2	3	4	5	6	7	8	9	10	Final
Kallos 🔨	1	0	0	2	0	1	0	0	2	0	6
Horgan	0	1	1	0	3	0	0	1	0	1	7

Sheet E	1	2	3	4	5	6	7	8	9	10	Final
Pickering 🔨	0	0	4	0	0	1	2	0	3	X	10
Lahti	1	0	0	2	1	0	0	1	0	X	5

Sheet F	1	2	3	4	5	6	7	8	9	10	Final
McCarville	0	2	1	0	3	2	0	3	X	X	11
Logan 🔨	3	0	0	1	0	0	1	0	X	X	5

==== Draw 7 ====
December 11, 9:00 AM ET

Sheet C	1	2	3	4	5	6	7	8	9	10	Final
Logan	0	3	0	1	0	0	1	0	2	X	7
Pickering 🔨	1	0	2	0	2	1	0	3	0	X	9

Sheet E	1	2	3	4	5	6	7	8	9	10	Final
Horgan	0	3	0	0	1	0	2	0	1	0	7
McCarville 🔨	2	0	3	1	0	1	0	1	0	1	9

Sheet F	1	2	3	4	5	6	7	8	9	10	Final
Dahl	0	3	0	4	0	0	1	X	X	X	8
Lahti 🔨	2	0	1	0	0	1	0	X	X	X	4
