= 2013 Ontario Scotties Tournament of Hearts =

Canadian provincial women's curling championship

- Host city: Waterloo, Ontario
- Arena: Kitchener-Waterloo Granite Club
- Dates: January 21–27
- Winner: Rachel Homan
- Curling club: Ottawa Curling Club
- Skip: Rachel Homan
- Third: Emma Miskew
- Second: Alison Kreviazuk
- Lead: Lisa Weagle
- Coach: Earle Morris
- Finalist: Cathy Auld

The 2013 Ontario Scotties Tournament of Hearts, women's provincial curling championship, was held January 21–27, 2013 at the Kitchener-Waterloo Granite Club in Waterloo, Ontario. The winning Rachel Homan rink went on to represent Ontario at the 2013 Scotties Tournament of Hearts in Kingston, Ontario.

== Qualification Process ==
Ten teams qualify for the provincial tournament through several methods. Four teams qualify from Northern Ontario, two teams qualify from Regions 1&2, two teams qualify from regions 3&4 and two teams qualify from the Challenge Round.

Qualification method	Berths	Qualifying Team
Northern Ontario provincial 1st-place finish	1	Krista McCarville
Northern Ontario provincial 2nd-place finish	1	Tracy Horgan
Northern Ontario provincial 3rd-place finish	1	Marlo Dahl
Northern Ontario provincial 4th-place finish	1	Kendra Lilly
Regions 1 & 2 Qualifiers	2	Rachel Homan; Julie Hastings
Regions 3 & 4 Qualifiers	2	Jacqueline Harrison; Sherry Middaugh
Challenge Round Qualifiers	2	Jill Mouzar; Cathy Auld

== Teams ==
Skip	Third	Second	Lead	Club(s)
Krista McCarville	Ashley Miharija	Kari Lavoie	Sarah Lang	Fort William Curling Club, Thunder Bay
Marlo Dahl	Angela Lee	Steph Davis	Kim Zsakai	Port Arthur Curling Club, Thunder Bay
Tracy Horgan	Jennifer Horgan	Jenna Enge	Amanda Gates	Idlywylde Golf & Curling Club, Sudbury
Kendra Lilly	Laura Forget	Courtney Chenier	JoAnne Comé-Forget	North Bay Granite Curling Club, North Bay
Rachel Homan	Emma Miskew	Alison Kreviazuk	Lisa Weagle	Ottawa Curling Club, Ottawa
Julie Hastings	Christy Trombley	Stacey Smith	Catrina Collins	Bayview Curling Club, Thornhill
Jacqueline Harrison	Kimberly Tuck	Susan Froud	Heather Nicol	Brant Curling Club, Brantford
Sherry Middaugh	Jo-Ann Rizzo	Lee Merklinger	Leigh Armstrong	Coldwater and District Curling Club, Coldwater
Jill Mouzar	Stephanie LeDrew	Danielle Inglis	Hollie Nicol	Donalda Curling Club, Toronto
Cathy Auld	Janet Murphy	Stephanie Gray	Melissa Foster	Mississaugua Golf & Country Club, Mississauga

== Standings ==
Skip (Club)	W	L	PF	PA	Ends Won	Ends Lost	Blank Ends	Stolen Ends
Rachel Homan (Ottawa)	9	0	64	28	41	21	14	12
Cathy Auld (Mississaugua)	6	3	64	50	41	38	7	10
Krista McCarville (Fort William)	5	4	51	53	37	34	10	8
Sherry Middaugh (Coldwater)	5	4	58	49	39	38	13	10
Julie Hastings (Bayview)	5	4	54	48	40	37	12	10
Kendra Lilly (North Bay Granite)	4	5	47	60	28	37	11	5
Tracy Horgan (Idlywylde)	4	5	51	52	32	37	9	11
Jacqueline Harrison (Brant)	3	6	39	60	30	37	10	8
Jill Mouzar (Donalda)	3	6	47	57	34	35	13	9
Marlo Dahl (Port Arthur)	1	8	39	58	33	41	10	8

== Results ==
=== Draw 1 ===
January 21, 7:00 PM

Sheet A	1	2	3	4	5	6	7	8	9	10	11	Final
Rachel Homan	0	0	1	1	0	1	0	0	1	0	1	5
Julie Hastings 🔨	0	0	0	0	2	0	0	1	0	1	0	4

Sheet B	1	2	3	4	5	6	7	8	9	10	Final
Tracy Horgan 🔨	2	1	0	3	0	0	0	3	X	X	9
Krista McCarville	0	0	1	0	0	1	1	0	X	X	3

Sheet C	1	2	3	4	5	6	7	8	9	10	Final
Marlo Dahl 🔨	0	1	0	0	0	2	0	1	0	0	4
Jacqueline Harrison	0	0	2	0	1	0	0	0	1	1	5

Sheet D	1	2	3	4	5	6	7	8	9	10	Final
Sherry Middaugh	0	1	0	1	0	2	0	0	1	0	5
Jill Mouzar 🔨	0	0	0	0	1	0	1	1	0	0	3

Sheet E	1	2	3	4	5	6	7	8	9	10	Final
Kendra Lilly	0	0	1	0	2	0	1	0	X	X	4
Cathy Auld 🔨	1	1	0	3	0	1	0	3	X	X	9

=== Draw 2 ===
January 22, 2:00 PM

Sheet A	1	2	3	4	5	6	7	8	9	10	Final
Tracy Horgan 🔨	0	0	0	1	1	0	2	0	X	X	4
Kendra Lilly	0	1	2	0	0	3	0	3	X	X	9

Sheet B	1	2	3	4	5	6	7	8	9	10	Final
Julie Hastings 🔨	1	1	1	0	1	0	1	0	1	0	6
Jacqueline Harrison	0	0	0	1	0	1	0	1	0	2	5

Sheet C	1	2	3	4	5	6	7	8	9	10	Final
Rachel Homan 🔨	0	5	0	5	X	X	X	X	X	X	10
Jill Mouzar	0	0	1	0	X	X	X	X	X	X	1

Sheet D	1	2	3	4	5	6	7	8	9	10	Final
Krista McCarville 🔨	1	0	0	1	0	1	0	0	X	X	3
Cathy Auld	0	2	0	0	3	0	2	2	X	X	9

Sheet E	1	2	3	4	5	6	7	8	9	10	Final
Marlo Dahl	0	0	2	0	0	0	0	X	X	X	2
Sherry Middaugh 🔨	1	0	0	2	0	2	2	X	X	X	7

=== Draw 3 ===
January 22, 7:00 PM

Sheet A	1	2	3	4	5	6	7	8	9	10	Final
Marlo Dahl 🔨	1	1	1	0	0	0	2	0	0	X	5
Krista McCarville	0	0	0	2	2	1	0	1	1	X	7

Sheet B	1	2	3	4	5	6	7	8	9	10	11	Final
Jill Mouzar	3	0	0	1	0	0	1	0	1	1	0	7
Cathy Auld 🔨	0	0	2	0	1	2	0	2	0	0	1	8

Sheet C	1	2	3	4	5	6	7	8	9	10	Final
Sherry Middaugh	0	0	1	0	0	1	0	2	0	0	4
Julie Hastings 🔨	0	0	0	1	1	0	1	0	3	1	7

Sheet D	1	2	3	4	5	6	7	8	9	10	Final
Kendra Lilly 🔨	0	4	0	0	5	0	0	1	X	X	10
Jacqueline Harrison	0	0	2	1	0	1	1	0	X	X	5

Sheet E	1	2	3	4	5	6	7	8	9	10	Final
Tracy Horgan 🔨	0	0	0	2	0	0	0	0	0	X	2
Rachel Homan	0	1	1	0	1	0	1	1	0	X	5

=== Draw 4 ===
January 23, 2:00 PM

Sheet A	1	2	3	4	5	6	7	8	9	10	11	Final
Julie Hastings 🔨	0	1	0	0	1	1	0	1	0	0	1	5
Jill Mouzar	0	0	01	0	0	0	0	0	2	1	0	4

Sheet B	1	2	3	4	5	6	7	8	9	10	Final
Marlo Dahl 🔨	1	0	2	0	1	0	0	1	0	0	5
Tracy Horgan	0	1	0	2	0	1	0	0	2	2	8

Sheet C	1	2	3	4	5	6	7	8	9	10	Final
Krista McCarville 🔨	0	0	2	0	1	3	0	3	X	X	9
Kendra Lilly	0	0	0	1	0	0	1	0	X		2

Sheet D	1	2	3	4	5	6	7	8	9	10	Final
Rachel Homan 🔨	0	2	0	2	0	2	1	0	2	X	9
Sherry Middaugh	0	0	2	0	2	0	0	2	0	X	6

Sheet E	1	2	3	4	5	6	7	8	9	10	Final
Cathy Auld 🔨	1	0	1	0	0	1	0	3	1	X	7
Jacqueline Harrison	0	1	0	2	1	0	1	0	0	X	5

=== Draw 5 ===
January 23, 7:00 PM

Sheet A	1	2	3	4	5	6	7	8	9	10	Final
Jacqueline Harrison	0	0	0	1	0	0	0	X	X	X	1
Rachel Homan 🔨	0	1	2	0	2	0	3	X	X	X	8

Sheet B	1	2	3	4	5	6	7	8	9	10	Final
Sherry Middaugh	0	2	0	0	2	3	2	X	X	X	9
Kendra Lilly 🔨	2	0	0	2	0	0	0	X	X	X	4

Sheet C	1	2	3	4	5	6	7	8	9	10	Final
Tracy Horgan 🔨	2	0	0	1	0	1	0	0	0	X	4
Cathy Auld	0	1	1	0	1	0	1	1	2	X	7

Sheet D	1	2	3	4	5	6	7	8	9	10	Final
Julie Hastings	0	1	0	1	1	0	2	0	1	0	6
Krista McCarville 🔨	1	0	1	0	0	3	0	1	0	1	7

Sheet E	1	2	3	4	5	6	7	8	9	10	Final
Jill Mouzar 🔨	2	0	0	1	0	1	2	0	1	X	7
Marlo Dahl	0	0	1	0	1	0	0	2	0	X	4

=== Draw 6 ===
January 24, 2:00 PM

Sheet A	1	2	3	4	5	6	7	8	9	10	11	Final
Sherry Middaugh 🔨	1	0	1	0	2	0	2	0	0	1	1	8
Cathy Auld	0	2	0	2	0	1	0	2	0	0	0	7

Sheet B	1	2	3	4	5	6	7	8	9	10	Final
Rachel Homan 🔨	1	0	1	0	2	0	1	0	2	X	7
Marlo Dahl	0	1	0	1	0	2	0	1	0	X	5

Sheet C	1	2	3	4	5	6	7	8	9	10	Final
Jill Mouzar	1	0	2	0	0	4	0	0	1	X	8
Krista McCarville 🔨	0	1	0	0	1	0	1	2	0	X	5

Sheet D	1	2	3	4	5	6	7	8	9	10	Final
Jacqueline Harrison 🔨	0	2	0	0	0	0	X	X	X	X	2
Tracy Horgan	1	0	2	3	1	1	X	X	X	X	8

Sheet E	1	2	3	4	5	6	7	8	9	10	Final
Julie Hastings	0	1	0	0	1	1	0	1	0	5	9
Kendra Lilly 🔨	1	0	0	2	0	0	1	0	1	0	5

=== Draw 7 ===
January 24, 7:00 PM

Sheet A	1	2	3	4	5	6	7	8	9	10	Final
Jill Mouzar 🔨	0	0	2	0	0	3	1	1	0	1	8
Tracy Horgan	1	3	0	1	0	0	0	0	2	0	7

Sheet B	1	2	3	4	5	6	7	8	9	10	Final
Cathy Auld	1	0	0	2	0	2	1	0	2	X	8
Julie Hastings 🔨	0	1	0	0	1	0	0	2	0	X	4

Sheet C	1	2	3	4	5	6	7	8	9	10	Final
Jacqueline Harrison	0	1	0	0	1	0	2	2	0	1	7
Sherry Middaugh 🔨	2	0	0	2	0	1	0	0	1	0	6

Sheet D	1	2	3	4	5	6	7	8	9	10	Final
Marlo Dahl	1	0	0	0	1	1	1	0	0	0	4
Kendra Lilly 🔨	0	1	0	1	0	0	0	1	1	1	5

Sheet E	1	2	3	4	5	6	7	8	9	10	Final
Rachel Homan 🔨	0	1	0	1	1	0	1	2	0	X	6
Krista McCarville	0	0	1	0	0	1	0	0	1	X	3

=== Draw 8 ===
January 25, 2:00 PM

Sheet A	1	2	3	4	5	6	7	8	9	10	Final
Krista McCarville 🔨	0	1	0	0	0	3	0	2	1	X	7
Jacqueline Harrison	0	0	0	1	0	0	1	0	0	X	2

Sheet B	1	2	3	4	5	6	7	8	9	10	Final
Kendra Lilly	0	0	3	0	1	0	2	0	0	0	6
Jill Mouzar 🔨	1	0	0	1	0	1	0	1	0	1	5

Sheet C	1	2	3	4	5	6	7	8	9	10	Final
Julie Hastings	1	0	0	3	0	1	0	2	X	X	7
Marlo Dahl 🔨	0	0	1	0	1	0	1	0	X	X	3

Sheet D	1	2	3	4	5	6	7	8	9	10	Final
Cathy Auld	0	2	1	0	0	0	0	1	0	0	4
Rachel Homan 🔨	2	0	0	2	0	1	0	0	1	2	8

Sheet E	1	2	3	4	5	6	7	8	9	10	Final
Sherry Middaugh	0	0	1	0	1	2	1	2	X	X	7
Tracy Horgan 🔨	1	0	0	1	0	0	0	0	X	X	2

=== Draw 9 ===
January 25, 7:00 PM

Sheet A	1	2	3	4	5	6	7	8	9	10	11	Final
Cathy Auld	0	0	2	0	0	1	1	0	0	1	0	5
Marlo Dahl 🔨	1	1	0	1	0	0	0	1	1	0	2	7

Sheet B	1	2	3	4	5	6	7	8	9	10	11	Final
Krista McCarville 🔨	0	1	0	1	0	1	0	1	0	2	2	8
Sherry Middaugh	0	0	2	0	1	0	2	0	1	0	0	6

Sheet C	1	2	3	4	5	6	7	8	9	10	Final
Kendra Lilly	0	1	0	0	0	0	1	0	X	X	2
Rachel Homan 🔨	2	0	2	0	1	0	0	1	X	X	6

Sheet D	1	2	3	4	5	6	7	8	9	10	Final
Tracy Horgan 🔨	1	0	1	1	0	0	2	0	2	0	7
Julie Hastings	0	0	0	0	2	1	0	2	0	1	6

Sheet E	1	2	3	4	5	6	7	8	9	10	Final
Jacqueline Harrison	0	2	1	0	2	0	1	1	X	X	7
Jill Mouzar 🔨	1	0	0	1	0	2	0	0	X	X	4

=== Tie breaker ===
January 26, 9:00 AM

Team	1	2	3	4	5	6	7	8	9	10	Final
Sherry Middaugh 🔨	0	2	1	0	1	0	1	1	0	1	7
Julie Hastings	1	0	0	1	0	1	0	0	2	0	5

== Playoffs ==
Page playoff system
1	Rachel Homan	9
2	Cathy Auld	0
3	Krista McCarville	7
4	Sherry Middaugh	9

Semifinal
2	Cathy Auld	10
4	Sherry Middaugh	4

Final
1	Rachel Homan	7
2	Cathy Auld	3

=== 1 vs. 2 ===
January 26, 2:00 PM

Team	1	2	3	4	5	6	7	8	9	10	Final
Rachel Homan 🔨	0	0	3	1	5	X	X	X	X	X	9
Cathy Auld	0	0	0	0	0	X	X	X	X	X	0

=== 3 vs. 4 ===
January 26, 7:00 PM

Team	1	2	3	4	5	6	7	8	9	10	Final
Krista McCarville 🔨	0	2	0	1	0	1	0	3	0	X	7
Sherry Middaugh	2	0	2	0	2	0	1	0	2	X	9

=== Semifinal ===
January 27, 9:30 AM

Team	1	2	3	4	5	6	7	8	9	10	Final
Sherry Middaugh	0	0	2	0	0	2	0	0	X	X	4
Cathy Auld 🔨	0	2	0	2	2	0	1	3	X	X	10

=== Final ===
January 27, 4:00 PM

Team	1	2	3	4	5	6	7	8	9	10	Final
Rachel Homan 🔨	1	0	1	0	0	3	0	2	0	X	7
Cathy Auld	0	1	0	0	0	0	1	0	1	X	3

2013 Ontario Scotties Tournament of Hearts

Rachel Homan
2nd Ontario Provincial Championship title

== Qualification ==
Southern Ontario zones run from November 30-December 2, December 7–11 and December 14–18, 2012. Two teams from each zone qualify to 2 regional tournaments, and two teams from each of the two tournaments qualify to provincials. Two additional teams qualify out of a second chance qualifier.

The Northern Ontario provincial championship will occur December 13–16, 2012 at the Little Falls Curling Club in Atikokan, Ontario. Four teams qualify out of the Northern Ontario championship.

Regional Qualifiers In Bold

=== Southern Ontario Zone Qualification ===
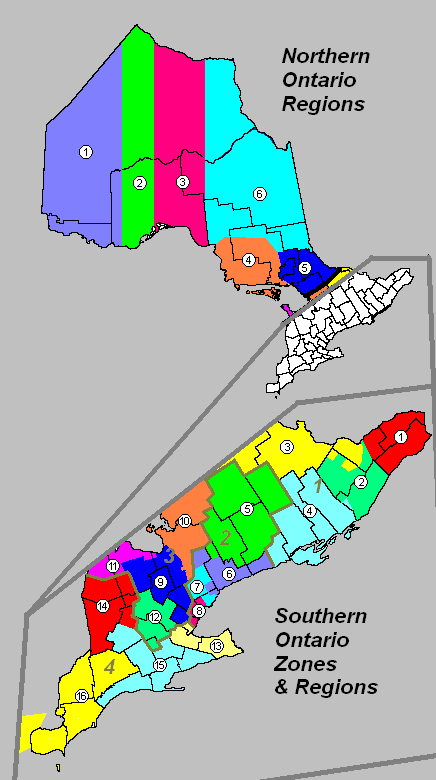
Zone Map

==== Zone 1 ====
December 7–9, at the RCMP Curling Club, Ottawa

Teams entered:

- Jennifer Harvey (Cornwall)
- **Katie Morrissey** (Ottawa)
- **Rachel Homan** (Ottawa)

==== Zone 2 ====
December 7–9, at the RCMP Curling Club, Ottawa

Teams entered:

- Laura Payne (Rideau)
- Lauren Mann (Rideau)
- **Rhonda Varnes** (Rideau)
- **Tracy Samaan** (Rideau)
- Barb Kelly (Rideau)

==== Zone 3 ====
December 7–9, at the Carleton Heights Curling Club, Ottawa

Teams entered:

- **Jaimee Gardner** (City View) (automatically qualifies as only team)

==== Zone 4 ====
December 7–9, at the Garrison Golf & Curling Club, Kingston

Teams entered:

- **Lindsay McKeown** (Cataraqui)
- **Lisa Farnell** (Loonie)

Both teams qualify as there were no other entries.

==== Zone 5 ====
December 7–9, at the Fenelon Falls Curling Club, Fenelon Falls

Teams entered:

- Angie Melaney (Lakefield)
- **Julie O'Neill** (Lindsay)
- **Kristine Mitchell** (Lindsay)

==== Zone 6 ====
December 8–11, at the Oshawa Curling Club, Oshawa

Teams entered:

- **Kaitlin Stubbs** (Annandale)
- Stephanie Van Huyse (Whitby)
- **Susan McKnight** (Uxbridge)

==== Zone 7 ====
December 7–9, at the Bayview Golf & Country Club, Thornhill

Teams entered:

- **Julie Hastings** (Bayview)
- **Jill Mouzar** (Donalda)
- Elana Sone (East York)
- Shawnessy Johnson (East York)
- Christine Anderson (Leaside)
- Fiona Shearer (Richmond Hill)
- **Colleen Madonia (Thornhill)** (qualified to represent Zone 3, due to lack of entries there)

==== Zone 8 ====
December 8–9, at the St. George's Golf & Country Club, Toronto

- **Cathy Auld** (Mississaugua)
- Ashley Waye (Royals)
- **Kelly Cochrane** (High Park)

==== Zone 9 ====
December 7–9, at the Markdale Golf & Curling Club, Markdale

Teams entered:

- **Heather Graham** (King)
- **Marika Bakewell** (Markdale)
- Jen Spencer (Brampton)

==== Zone 10 ====
December 7–9, at the Bradford & District Curling Club, Bradford

Teams entered:

- **Julie Reddick** (Bradford)
- **Sherry Middaugh** (Coldwater)
- Kristeen Wilson (Midland)
- Julie Truscott (Parry Sound)

==== Zone 11 ====
December 7–9, at the Chesley Curling Club, Chesley

Teams entered:

- No teams entered.

==== Zone 12 ====
November 30-December 2, at the Elora Curling Club, Elora

Teams entered:

- **Kristy Russell** (Elora) (qualifies out of zone 11 due to lack of teams)
- Sheri Smeltzer (Fergus)
- **Courtney Hodgson** (Guelph)
- Kathy Ryan (Kitchener-Waterloo Granite)
- **Taylor Mellor** (Kitchener-Waterloo Granite)
- **Tiffany Anjema** (Westmount) (qualifies out of zone 11 due to lack of teams)

==== Zone 13 ====
December 14–18, at the Hamilton Victoria Club, Hamilton

Teams entered:

- Michelle Fletcher (Burlington)
- **Ginger Coyle** (Dundas Granite)
- Candace Coe (Dundas Granite)
- **Katie Lindsay** (Welland)

==== Zone 14 ====
December 7–9, at the Listowel Curling Club, Listowel

Teams entered:

- **Allison Nimik** (Listowel)
- **Kelsey Bennewies** (Seaforth)

Both teams advance as they were the only two teams to enter

==== Zone 15 ====
December 7–9, at the Aylmer Curling Club, Aylmer

Teams entered:

- **Jacqueline Harrison** (Brant)
- **Chantal Lalonde** (Woodstock)
- Dianne Dykstra (Brant)

==== Zone 16 ====
December 7–9, at the Forest Curling & Social Club, Forest

Teams entered:

- **Brenda Anderson** (Forest)
- **Bethany Heinrichs** (Ilderton)

(Both teams qualified as the only entries)

=== Regions 1 & 2 ===
January 4–6, Omemee Curling Club, Omemee

A side
5A	Kristine Mitchell	8
4B	**Lindsay McKeown**	**9**
6A	Susan McKnight	5
3B	**Colleen Madonia**	**12**
7A	**Julie Hastings**	**10**
2B	Tracy Samaan	6
8A	**Kelly Cochrane**	**10**
1B	Katie Morrissey	9
1A	**Rachel Homan**	**11**
8B	Cathy Auld	4
2A	Rhonda Varnes	4
7B	Jill Mouzar	**7**
3A	**Jaimee Gardner**	**10**
6B	Kaitlin Stubbs	8
4A	**Lisa Farnell**	**7**
5B	Julie O'Neill	5

Quarterfinal
4B	Lindsay McKeown	6
3B	**Colleen Madonia**	**7**
7A	**Julie Hastings**	**7**
8A	Kelly Cochrane	2
1A	**Rachel Homan**	**7**
7B	Jill Mouzar	3
3A	Jaimee Gardner	2
4A	**Lisa Farnell**	**9**

Semifinal
3B	Colleen Madonia	0
7A	**Julie Hastings**	**9**
1A	**Rachel Homan**	**6**
4A	Lisa Farnell	3

Final
7A	Julie Hastings	4
1A	**Rachel Homan**	**5**

B Side (Top half)
5A	Kristine Mitchell	2
6A	**Susan McKnight**	**8**
2B	**Tracy Samaan**	**10**
1B	Katie Morrissey	2

Semifinals
3A	**Jaimee Gardner**	**9**
6A	Susan McKnight	8
7B	**Jill Mouzar**	**11**
2B	Tracy Samaan	3

Finals
3A	**Jaimee Gardner**	**10**
7B	Jill Mouzar	8

B Side (Bottom half)
8B	Cathy Auld	3
2A	**Rhonda Varnes**	**10**
6B	**Kaitlin Stubbs**	**11**
5B	Julie O'Neill	8

Semifinals
8A	**Kelly Cochrane**	**8**
2A	Rhonda Varnes	4
4B	**Lindsay McKeown**	**9**
6B	Kaitlin Stubbs	6

Finals
8A	**Kelly Cochrane**	**9**
4B	Lindsay McKeown	1

B Side			Semifinal			**Final**
						8A	Kelly Cochrane	5
3A	Jaimee Garnder	7				7A	**Julie Hastings**	**9**
3B	**Colleen Madonia**	**9**	3B	Colleen Madonia	8
8A	**Kelly Cochrane**	**8**	8A	**Kelly Cochrane**	**10**
4A	Lisa Farnell	6

=== Regions 3&4 ===
January 4–6, Woodstock Curling Club, Woodstock

A side
13A	Katie Lindsay	3
12B	**Taylor Mellor**	**7**
14A	Allison Nimik	1
11B	**Tiffany Anjema**	**5**
15A	**Jacqueline Harrison**	**7**
10B	Sherry Middaugh	6
16A	Brenda Anderson	3
9B	**Marika Bakewell**	**10**
9A	Heather Graham	2
16B	**Bethany Heinrichs**	**6**
10A	**Julie Reddick**	**6**
15B	Chantal Lalonde	5
11A	**Kristy Russell**	**8**
14B	Kelsey Bennewies	1
12A	**Courtney Hodgson**	**9**
13B	Ginger Coyle	5

Quarterfinal
12B	Taylor Mellor	2
11B	**Tiffany Anjema**	**5**
15A	**Jacqueline Harrison**	**6**
9B	Marika Bakewell	3
16B	Bethany Heinrichs	2
10A	**Julie Reddick**	**8**
11A	**Kristy Russell**	**10**
12A	Courtney Hodgson	7

Semifinal
11B	Tiffany Anjema	9
15A	**Jacqueline Harrison**	**10**
10A	Julie Reddick	6
11A	**Kristy Russell**	**10**

Final
15A	**Jacqueline Harrison**	**8**
11A	Kristy Russell	6

B Side (Top half)
13A	Katie Lindsay	1
14A	**Allison Nimik**	**6**
10B	**Sherry Middaugh**	**6**
16A	Brenda Anderson	3

Semifinals
12A	Courtney Hodgson	4
14A	**Allison Nimik**	**7**
16B	Bethany Heinrichs	5
10B	**Sherry Middaugh**	**7**

Finals
14A	Allison Nimik	7
10B	**Sherry Middaugh**	**8**

B Side (Bottom half)
9A	Heather Graham	2
15B	**Chantal Lalonde**	**10**
14B	Kelsey Bennewies	1
13B	**Ginger Coyle**	**6**

Semifinals
9B	Marika Bakewell	2
15B	**Chantal Lalonde**	**10**
12B	**Taylor Mellor**	**8**
13B	Ginger Coyle	5

Finals
15B	**Chantal Lalonde**	**8**
12B	Taylor Mellor	2

B Side			Semifinal			**Final**
						10B	**Sherry Middaugh**	**7**
10B	**Sherry Middaugh**	**10**				11A	Kristy Russell	2
11B	Tiffany Anjema	3	10B	**Sherry Middaugh**	**7**
15B	Chantal Lalonde	6	10A	Julie Reddick	6
10A	**Julie Reddick**	**7**

=== Challenge Round ===
January 11–13, at the Oakville Curling Club in Oakville

A Side
Cathy Auld
BYE
Kelly Cochrane	3
**Chantal Lalonde**	**6**
**Jill Mouzar**	**7**
Lauren Mann	5
**Lisa Farnell**	**8**
Shawnessy Johnson	5
A5	**Julie Reddick**	**9**
A5	Jen Spencer	8
A6	**Kristy Russell**	**9**
A6	Marika Bakewell	5
A7	**Susan McKnight**	**6**
A7	Heather Graham	4
A8	Allison Nimik	2
A8	**Sarah Picton**	**10**

Quarterfinals
A1	**Cathy Auld**	**7**
A2	Chantal Lalonde	3
A3	**Jill Mouzar**	**7**
A4	Lisa Farnell	4
A5	Julie Reddick	3
A6	**Kristy Russell**	**8**
A7	**Susan McKnight**	**10**
A8	Sarah Picton	5

Semifinals
A9	Cathy Auld	5
A10	**Jill Mouzar**	**8**
A11	**Kristy Russell**	**8**
A12	Susan McKnight	6

Finals
A13	**Jill Mouzar**	**7**
A14	Kristy Russell	5

B Side (Top half)
A1	BYE
A2	Kelly Cochrane
A3	**Lauren Mann**	**7**
A4	Shawnessy Johnson	0

Semifinals
A12	**Sarah Picton**	**9**
B1	Kelly Cochrane	6
A11	**Julie Reddick**	**7**
B2	Lauren Mann	2

Finals
B5	Sarah Picton	4
B6	**Julie Reddick**	**8**

B Side (Bottom half)
A5	Jen Spencer	7
A6	**Marika Bakewell**	**8**
A7	**Heather Graham**	**9**
A8	Allison Nimik	8

Semifinals
A10	**Lisa Farnell**	**7**
B3	Marika Bakewell	6
A9	**Chantal Lalonde**	**8**
B4	Heather Graham	3

Finals
B7	**Lisa Farnell**	**8**
B8	Chantal Lalonde	2

B Side			Semifinal			**Final**
						A15	Kristy Russell	2
A13	**Cathy Auld**	**9**				B13	**Cathy Auld**	**7**
B9	Julie Reddick	4	B11	**Cathy Auld**	**8**
A14	Lisa Farnell	7	B12	Susan McKnight	6
B10	**Susan McKnight**	**8**

== Northern Ontario Provincials ==
The Northern Ontario provincial championship was held from December 13 to 16, 2012 at the Atikokan Curling Club in Atikokan, Ontario.

=== Teams ===
Skip	Third	Second	Lead	Alternate	Locale
Marlo Dahl	Angela Lee	Steph Davis	Kim Zsakai	Anne Zsakai	Port Arthur Curling Club, Thunder Bay
Liane Fossum	Shana Marchessault	Victoria Anderson	Lisa Auld		Port Arthur Curling Club, Thunder Bay
Krista McCarville	Ashley Miharija	Kari Lavoie	Sarah Lang		Fort William Curling Club, Thunder Bay
Tracy Horgan	Jennifer Horgan	Jenna Enge	Amanda Gates		Idlywylde Golf & Curling Club, Sudbury
Kendra Lilly	Laura Forget	Courtney Chenier	JoAnne Comé-Forget		North Bay Granite Curling Club, North Bay

=== Round-robin standings ===
Key
Teams to Provincials
Teams to Tiebreaker

Skip	W	L
Krista McCarville	4	0
Tracy Horgan	2	2
Marlo Dahl	2	2
Kendra Lilly	1	3
Liane Fossum	1	3

=== Round-robin results ===
All draw times listed in Eastern Standard Time.

==== Draw 1 ====
Friday, December 14, 1:30 pm

Sheet 1	1	2	3	4	5	6	7	8	9	10	Final
Kendra Lilly	0	0	1	1	0	0	0	0	0	X	2
Tracy Horgan	0	2	0	0	0	1	0	1	2	X	6

Sheet 2	1	2	3	4	5	6	7	8	9	10	Final
Liane Fossum	0	1	0	0	1	1	0	X	X	X	3
Krista McCarville	2	0	2	3	0	0	2	X	X	X	9

==== Draw 2 ====
Friday, December 14, 7:30 pm

Sheet 2	1	2	3	4	5	6	7	8	9	10	Final
Tracy Horgan	1	0	2	0	0	0	1	0	4	1	9
Marlo Dahl	0	2	0	0	1	1	0	2	0	0	6

Sheet 3	1	2	3	4	5	6	7	8	9	10	Final
Krista McCarville	0	0	2	0	0	3	2	0	2	X	9
Kendra Lilly	0	2	0	0	2	0	0	1	0	X	5

==== Draw 3 ====
Saturday, December 15, 10:00 am

Sheet 1	1	2	3	4	5	6	7	8	9	10	Final
Marlo Dahl	1	1	0	2	0	0	1	1	0	X	6
Krista McCarville	0	0	1	0	3	2	0	0	3	X	9

Sheet 2	1	2	3	4	5	6	7	8	9	10	Final
Kendra Lilly	0	0	1	2	0	3	2	0	0	X	8
Liane Fossum	0	1	0	0	2	0	0	1	2	X	6

==== Draw 4 ====
Saturday, December 15, 6:30 pm

Sheet 2	1	2	3	4	5	6	7	8	9	10	Final
Krista McCarville	1	0	1	0	1	0	3	0	0	2	8
Tracy Horgan	0	2	0	3	0	1	0	0	1	0	7

Sheet 3	1	2	3	4	5	6	7	8	9	10	Final
Liane Fossum	0	1	1	0	0	0	0	0	1	X	3
Marlo Dahl	1	0	0	1	1	2	1	1	0	X	7

==== Draw 5 ====
Sunday, December 16, 9:00 am

Sheet 1	1	2	3	4	5	6	7	8	9	10	Final
Tracy Horgan	0	1	0	2	1	0	2	0	1	0	7
Liane Fossum	2	0	3	0	0	2	0	2	0	1	10

Sheet 2	1	2	3	4	5	6	7	8	9	10	Final
Marlo Dahl	1	0	2	0	1	0	2	0	0	X	6
Kendra Lilly	0	0	0	2	0	1	0	0	0	X	3

==== Tie breaker ====
Sunday, December 16, 1:00 pm

Sheet 3	1	2	3	4	5	6	7	8	9	10	Final
Kendra Lilly	2	0	2	0	3	0	2	X	X	X	9
Liane Fossum	0	0	0	1	0	1	0	X	X	X	2

Kendra Lilly advances to the provincials.
