= 2011 Ontario Scotties Tournament of Hearts =

- Host city: Thornhill, Ontario
- Arena: Thornhill G&CC
- Dates: January 24–30
- Winner: Rachel Homan
- Curling club: Ottawa Curling Club
- Skip: Rachel Homan
- Third: Emma Miskew
- Second: Alison Kreviazuk
- Lead: Lisa Weagle
- Coach: Andrea Ronnebeck
- Finalist: Krista McCarville

The 2011 Ontario Scotties Tournament of Hearts was the 2011 edition of the Ontario provincial women's curling championship. It was held January 24–30 at the Thornhill Golf and Country Club in Thornhill, Ontario. The winning team of Rachel Homan represented Ontario at the 2011 Scotties Tournament of Hearts in Charlottetown, Prince Edward Island. The team finished round robin play with a record of 8-3, where they defeated Nova Scotia in the 3-4 page playoff game, but were unsuccessful in the semi-final losing against Saskatchewan, and then losing the Bronze Medal Game to team Nova Scotia.

== Teams ==
Skip	Vice	Second	Lead	Club
Marika Bakewell	Katie Pringle	Jordan Robertson	Jordan Ariss	Highland Curling Club, London, Ontario
Marlo Dahl	Shana Ketonen	Julie Ruoho	Carly Ray	Port Arthur Curling Club, Thunder Bay
Lisa Farnell	Erin Morrissey	Kim Brown	Ainsley Galbraith	Peterborough Curling Club, Peterborough
Rachel Homan	Emma Miskew	Alison Kreviazuk	Lisa Weagle	Ottawa Curling Club, Ottawa, Ontario
Tracy Horgan	Jennifer Seabrook	Jenna Enge	Amanda Gates	Idylwylde Golf and Country Club, Sudbury
Ashley Kallos	Alissa Begin	Jackie McCormick	Oye-Sem Won	Fort William Curling Club, Thunder Bay
Krista McCarville	Ashley Miharija	Kari MacLean	Sarah Lang	Fort William Curling Club, Thunder Bay
Susan McKnight	Susan Froud	Cindy McKnight	Karen Rowsell	Uxbridge Curling Club, Uxbridge, Ontario
Cheryl McPherson	Karen Bell	Stephanie Corrado	Alison Goring (skip)	The Club at North Halton, Georgetown
Kristy Russell	Michelle Gray	Kathy Freure	Joanne Curtis	Shelburne Curling Club, Shelburne, Ontario

== Standings ==
Skip (Club)	W	L	PF	PA	Ends Won	Ends Lost	Blank Ends	Stolen Ends
Rachel Homan (Ottawa)	8	1	69	31	40	24	6	16
Tracy Horgan (Idylwylde)	7	2	65	56	39	40	5	7
Krista McCarville (Fort William)	6	3	60	52	34	32	14	10
Susan McKnight (Uxbridge)	5	4	61	63	39	44	5	8
Lisa Farnell (Peterborough)	5	4	65	60	44	36	4	15
Marlo Dahl (Port Arthur)	4	5	60	57	34	37	6	7
Ashley Kallos (Fort William)	3	6	51	60	39	38	8	1
Marika Bakewell (Highland)	3	6	42	53	30	29	7	9
Alison Goring (North Halton)	2	7	48	70	29	42	1	4
Kristy Russell (Shelburne)	2	7	45	63	34	38	10	8

== Results ==
=== Draw 1 ===
January 24, 7:00 PM ET

Sheet A	1	2	3	4	5	6	7	8	9	10	Final
Horgan	0	3	0	0	0	1	0	2	2	2	10
Farnell 🔨	1	0	2	1	1	0	2	0	0	0	7

Sheet B	1	2	3	4	5	6	7	8	9	10	Final
Goring 🔨	3	1	0	2	1	0	4	X	X	X	11
Kallos	0	0	1	0	0	2	0	X	X	X	3

Sheet C	1	2	3	4	5	6	7	8	9	10	Final
Dahl	0	0	3	3	0	3	X	X	X	X	9
McCarville 🔨	1	0	0	0	1	0	X	X	X	X	2

Sheet D	1	2	3	4	5	6	7	8	9	10	Final
Homan	1	2	0	4	1	0	3	X	X	X	11
Bakewell 🔨	0	0	2	0	0	1	0	X	X	X	3

Sheet E	1	2	3	4	5	6	7	8	9	10	11	Final
McKnight 🔨	0	3	0	1	0	0	0	2	0	2	1	9
Russell	0	0	2	0	2	1	1	0	2	0	0	8

=== Draw 2 ===
January 25, 2:00 PM ET

Sheet A	1	2	3	4	5	6	7	8	9	10	Final
Goring	0	1	2	0	0	2	0	1	0	0	6
McKnight 🔨	1	0	0	1	2	0	1	0	2	1	8

Sheet B	1	2	3	4	5	6	7	8	9	10	Final
Farnell	0	0	1	2	2	0	0	0	0	2	7
McCarville 🔨	0	0	0	0	0	2	1	1	2	0	6

Sheet C	1	2	3	4	5	6	7	8	9	10	Final
Horgan	0	2	0	1	0	1	0	2	1	0	7
Bakewell 🔨	0	0	1	0	2	0	1	0	0	1	6

Sheet D	1	2	3	4	5	6	7	8	9	10	Final
Kallos 🔨	0	1	2	0	0	1	0	1	1	X	6
Russell	0	0	0	1	1	0	0	0	0	X	2

Sheet E	1	2	3	4	5	6	7	8	9	10	Final
Dahl 🔨	0	1	1	0	0	0	0	0	X	X	2
Homan	2	0	0	0	2	0	2	1	X	X	7

=== Draw 3 ===
January 25, 7:00 PM ET

Sheet A	1	2	3	4	5	6	7	8	9	10	Final
Dahl	0	1	0	2	0	3	0	0	1	0	7
Kallos 🔨	1	0	1	0	1	0	2	1	0	2	8

Sheet B	1	2	3	4	5	6	7	8	9	10	Final
Bakewell	0	0	0	1	0	0	0	X	X	X	1
Russell 🔨	2	0	2	0	0	1	3	X	X	X	8

Sheet C	1	2	3	4	5	6	7	8	9	10	Final
Homan	0	3	0	2	0	1	0	4	X	X	10
Farnell 🔨	2	0	1	0	1	0	1	0	X	X	5

Sheet D	1	2	3	4	5	6	7	8	9	10	Final
McKnight	0	1	0	0	2	1	0	2	0	0	6
McCarville 🔨	1	0	0	3	0	0	1	0	1	1	7

Sheet E	1	2	3	4	5	6	7	8	9	10	Final
Goring	0	1	0	3	0	1	0	3	0	0	8
Horgan 🔨	1	0	2	0	2	0	2	0	2	1	10

=== Draw 4 ===
January 26, 2:00 PM ET

Sheet A	1	2	3	4	5	6	7	8	9	10	Final
Farnell 🔨	0	1	0	3	0	1	0	0	0	X	7
Bakewell	0	0	1	0	2	0	1	0	0	X	5

Sheet B	1	2	3	4	5	6	7	8	9	10	Final
Dahl 🔨	4	1	1	0	1	2	X	X	X	X	9
Goring	0	0	0	2	0	0	X	X	X	X	2

Sheet C	1	2	3	4	5	6	7	8	9	10	Final
Kallos	0	1	0	0	3	1	0	1	0	0	6
McKnight 🔨	2	0	3	1	0	0	1	0	1	1	9

Sheet D	1	2	3	4	5	6	7	8	9	10	Final
Horgan	0	0	1	0	0	1	0	0	X	X	2
Homan 🔨	2	1	0	1	0	0	1	1	X	X	6

Sheet E	1	2	3	4	5	6	7	8	9	10	Final
Russell	0	2	0	1	0	0	1	1	0	0	5
McCarville 🔨	2	0	0	0	0	2	0	0	1	3	8

=== Draw 5 ===
January 26, 7:00 PM ET

Sheet A	1	2	3	4	5	6	7	8	9	10	Final
McCarville	2	0	1	1	0	0	0	0	1	3	8
Horgan 🔨	0	1	0	0	2	1	0	0	0	0	4

Sheet B	1	2	3	4	5	6	7	8	9	10	Final
Homan	2	0	0	1	0	1	0	1	1	0	6
McKnight 🔨	0	1	1	0	1	0	3	0	0	2	8

Sheet C	1	2	3	4	5	6	7	8	9	10	Final
Goring 🔨	2	0	1	0	0	1	0	2	0	1	7
Russell	0	1	0	1	2	0	1	0	1	0	6

Sheet D	1	2	3	4	5	6	7	8	9	10	Final
Farnell	0	2	1	0	0	2	0	0	1	0	6
Kallos 🔨	1	0	0	0	1	0	1	1	0	1	5

Sheet E	1	2	3	4	5	6	7	8	9	10	Final
Bakewell 🔨	1	0	1	0	1	0	3	2	2	X	10
Dahl	0	2	0	1	0	1	0	0	0	X	4

=== Draw 6 ===
January 27, 2:00 PM ET

Sheet A	1	2	3	4	5	6	7	8	9	10	Final
Homan	0	3	1	2	0	2	X	X	X	X	8
Russell 🔨	1	0	0	0	1	0	X	X	X	X	2

Sheet B	1	2	3	4	5	6	7	8	9	10	Final
Horgan 🔨	0	0	2	0	1	0	2	1	0	1	7
Dahl	1	0	0	2	0	1	0	0	2	0	6

Sheet C	1	2	3	4	5	6	7	8	9	10	Final
Bakewell	1	0	1	0	1	0	1	0	0	X	4
Kallos 🔨	0	1	0	3	0	2	0	1	1	X	8

Sheet D	1	2	3	4	5	6	7	8	9	10	Final
McCarville 🔨	2	0	2	0	2	0	0	3	X	X	9
Goring	0	2	0	1	0	1	0	0	X	X	4

Sheet E	1	2	3	4	5	6	7	8	9	10	Final
McKnight 🔨	0	2	0	0	0	0	0	0	X	X	2
Farnell	1	0	2	1	1	1	1	1	X	X	8

=== Draw 7 ===
January 27, 7:00 PM ET

Sheet A	1	2	3	4	5	6	7	8	9	10	Final
Bakewell 🔨	3	1	1	0	1	0	0	3	X	X	9
Goring	0	0	0	1	0	2	1	0	X	X	4

Sheet B	1	2	3	4	5	6	7	8	9	10	Final
Russell 🔨	1	0	1	0	0	1	0	2	0	2	7
Farnell	0	1	0	1	0	0	2	0	2	0	6

Sheet C	1	2	3	4	5	6	7	8	9	10	Final
McCarville 🔨	0	2	0	1	2	0	1	0	0	X	6
Homan	0	0	2	0	0	1	0	3	3	X	9

Sheet D	1	2	3	4	5	6	7	8	9	10	Final
Dahl 🔨	1	0	0	2	0	0	2	0	1	0	6
McKnight	0	2	1	0	2	0	0	2	0	1	8

Sheet E	1	2	3	4	5	6	7	8	9	10	Final
Horgan 🔨	0	2	0	0	3	0	1	0	1	X	7
Kallos	1	0	0	2	0	1	0	1	0	X	5

=== Draw 8 ===
January 28, 2:00 PM ET

Sheet A	1	2	3	4	5	6	7	8	9	10	Final
Kallos 🔨	1	0	0	0	1	0	2	0	1	1	6
McCarville	0	0	3	0	0	2	0	2	0	0	7

Sheet B	1	2	3	4	5	6	7	8	9	10	Final
McKnight 🔨	0	0	0	0	0	2	0	2	0	0	4
Bakewell	0	0	0	1	4	0	1	0	1	1	8

Sheet C	1	2	3	4	5	6	7	8	9	10	Final
Farnell 🔨	1	0	2	0	2	2	0	2	0	0	9
Dahl	0	1	0	2	0	0	3	0	3	1	10

Sheet D	1	2	3	4	5	6	7	8	9	10	Final
Russell	0	1	1	0	0	1	0	2	0	X	5
Horgan 🔨	1	0	0	3	2	0	1	0	3	X	10

Sheet E	1	2	3	4	5	6	7	8	9	10	Final
Homan 🔨	2	1	2	1	1	X	X	X	X	X	7
Goring	0	0	0	0	0	X	X	X	X	X	0

=== Draw 9 ===
January 28, 7:00 PM ET

Sheet A	1	2	3	4	5	6	7	8	9	10	Final
Russell	0	0	3	0	0	0	1	0	2	0	6
Dahl 🔨	1	0	0	2	1	0	0	2	0	2	8

Sheet B	1	2	3	4	5	6	7	8	9	10	Final
Kallos 🔨	0	0	0	1	0	0	2	0	1	0	4
Homan	0	1	0	0	1	2	0	1	0	1	7

Sheet C	1	2	3	4	5	6	7	8	9	10	Final
McKnight	0	3	0	1	1	0	1	0	1	0	7
Horgan 🔨	4	0	2	0	0	1	0	2	0	1	10

Sheet D	1	2	3	4	5	6	7	8	9	10	Final
Goring 🔨	1	0	1	0	1	0	3	0	0	0	6
Farnell	0	1	0	1	0	2	0	1	3	2	10

Sheet E	1	2	3	4	5	6	7	8	9	10	Final
McCarville	3	0	0	2	0	0	4	X	X	X	9
Bakewell 🔨	0	1	1	0	0	0	0	X	X	X	2

=== Tie Breaker ===
January 29, 9:00 AM ET

Sheet A	1	2	3	4	5	6	7	8	9	10	Final
McKnight	0	0	0	2	0	2	1	0	0	3	8
Farnell 🔨	0	1	1	0	2	0	0	2	0	0	6

== Playoffs ==
Page playoff system
1	Rachel Homan	12
2	Tracy Horgan	4
3	Krista McCarville	6
4	Susan McKnight	2

Semifinal
2	Tracy Horgan	5
3	Krista McCarville	7

Final
1	Rachel Homan	9
3	Krista McCarville	6

=== 1 vs. 2 ===
January 29, 2:00 PM ET

Sheet 6	1	2	3	4	5	6	7	8	9	10	Final
Homan 🔨	5	0	0	1	0	2	0	4	X	X	12
Horgan	0	2	0	0	1	0	1	0	X	X	4

=== 3 vs. 4 ===
January 29, 7:00 PM ET

Sheet 7	1	2	3	4	5	6	7	8	9	10	Final
McCarville 🔨	1	0	0	0	1	1	0	1	1	1	6
McKnight	0	0	1	0	0	0	1	0	0	0	2

=== Semifinal ===
January 30, 9:30 AM ET

Sheet 7	1	2	3	4	5	6	7	8	9	10	Final
Horgan 🔨	1	0	2	0	1	0	0	0	1	0	5
McCarville	0	1	0	3	0	0	1	1	0	1	7

=== Final ===
January 30, 2:00 PM ET

Sheet 6	1	2	3	4	5	6	7	8	9	10	Final
Homan 🔨	0	4	0	2	0	1	0	0	2	X	9
McCarville	0	0	2	0	1	0	1	2	0	X	6

== Qualification ==
Southern Ontario zones began November 27, 2010 with zone 7. All other zones will have their playdowns the weekend of December 10. Two teams from each zone qualify to 2 regional tournaments, and two teams from each of the two tournaments qualify to provincials. Two additional teams qualify out of a second chance qualifier.

The Northern Ontario provincial championship will occur December 9–12 in Nipigon, Ontario. Four teams qualify out of the Northern Ontario championship.

Regional Qualifiers In Bold

=== Southern Ontario Zone Qualification ===
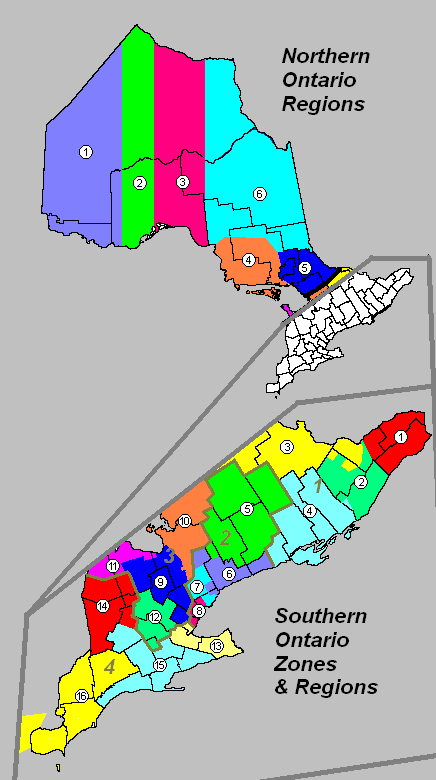
Zone Map

==== Zone 1 ====
December 11–12 at the Brockville Country Club, Brockville

- **Rachel Homan (Ottawa)**
- **Debra Karbashewski (Ottawa)**
- Katie Morrissey (Ottawa)

==== Zone 2 ====
December 11–12 at the Brockville Country Club, Brockville

- **Tracy Samaan (Rideau)**
- **Lauren Mann (Rideau)**
- **Christine McCrady (Rideau)** (Zone 3 Qualifier)
- Ling-Yue Hung (Rideau)
- Laura Payne (Rideau)
- Cheryl McBain (Rideau)

==== Zone 3 ====
December 10–12 at the Renfrew Curling Club, Renfrew

- **Jaimee Gardner (Granite of W. Ottawa)**

==== Zone 4 ====
December 10–12 at the Trenton Curling Club, Trenton

- **Dianne Wylie (Cataraqui)**
- **Lisa Farnell (Loonie)**

==== Zone 5 ====
December 10–12 at the Bancroft Curling Club, Bancroft

- **Julie O'Neill (Lindsay)**
- **Angie Melaney (Lakefield)**
- Faye Crear (Bobcaygeon)
- Denna Bagshaw (Cannington)

==== Zone 6 ====
December 11–13 at the Tam Heather Tennis and Curling Club, Toronto

- **Susan McKnight (Uxbridge)**
- **Janet McGhee (Port Perry)**
- Lianne Robertson (Tam Heather)

==== Zone 7 ====
November 27–28 at the Thornhill Golf and Country Club, Thornhill

- **Kirsten Wall (Donalda)**
- **Colleen Madonia (Thornhill)**
- Julie Hastings (Bayview)
- Christine Anderson (Leaside)
- Bev Wright (Thornhill)
- Joanne Heffernan (Bayview)

==== Zone 8 ====
December 11–15 at the Mississaugua Golf & Country Club, Mississauga

- **Cathy Auld (Mississaugua)**
- **Kelly Cochrane (High Park)**

==== Zone 9 ====
December 10–12 at the Alliston Curling Club, Alliston

- **Chrissy Cadorin (Shelburne)**
- **Alison Goring (North Halton)**
- Heather Marshall (Brampton)
- Susan Burnside (Chinguacousy)

==== Zone 10 ====
December 11–12 at the Stroud Curling Club, Stroud

- **Jacqueline Harrison (Elmvale)**
- **Sherry Middaugh (Coldwater)**
- Jenn Ellard (Bradford)
- Kristeen Wilson (Midland)
- Julie Truscott (Parry Sound)

==== Zone 11 ====
December 10–12 at the Wiarton Curling Club, Wiarton

- **Carrie Lindner (Port Elgin)**
- **Kerry Lackie (Port Elgin)**

==== Zone 12 ====
December 10–12 at the Ayr Curling Club, Ayr

- **Kathy Brown (Guelph Curling)**
- **Tracey Jones (Arthur)**
- Sheri Smeltzer (Fergus)
- Jen Spencer (Guelph Curling)
- Lisa McLean (K-W Granite)
- Kathy Ryan (K-W Granite)

==== Zone 13 ====
December 11–12 at the Glanford Curling Club, Mount Hope

- **Brit O'Neill (Glendale)**
- **Michelle Fletcher (Burlington Curling)**

==== Zone 14 ====
December 10–12 at the Vanastra Curling Club, Vanastra

- **Kaylene Rundle (Exeter)**

==== Zone 15 ====
December 10–12 at the Tillsonburg and District Curling Club, Tillsonburg

- **Heather Carr Olmstead (St. Thomas)**
- **Tina Mazerolle (Brant)**

==== Zone 16 ====
December 10–12 at the Ilderton Curling Club, Ilderton

- **Ruth Alexander (Highland)**
- **Marika Bakewell (Highland)**
- **Lisa Moore (Highland)** (Zone 14 Qualifier)
- Julie McMullin (Highland)
- Jennifer Scott (Sarnia)

=== Regions 1 & 2 ===
January 7–9, Royal Gananoque Curling Club

A Side
5A	Julie O'Neill	3
8B	**Kelly Cochrane**	**8**
6A	**Susan McKnight**	**10**
7B	Kirsten Wall	8
8A	**Cathy Auld**	**8**
5B	Angie Melaney	6
7A	Colleen Madonia	6
6B	**Janet McGhee**	**8**
1A	**Rachel Homan**	**10**
4B	Dianne Wylie	8
2A	**Tracy Samaan**	**9**
3B	Christine McCrady	3
4A	**Lisa Farnell**	**10**
1B	Debra Karbashewski	7
3A	Jaimee Gardner	2
2B	**Lauren Mann**	**8**

Quarter-finals
**Kelly Cochrane**	**W**
Susan McKnight	L
**Cathy Auld**	**8**
Janet McGhee	5
**Rachel Homan**	**8**
Tracey Samaan	5
**Lisa Farnell**	**6**
Lauren Mann	4

Semi-finals
Kelly Cochrane	6
**Cathy Auld**	**11**
Rachel Homan	4
**Lisa Farnell**

Final
Cathy Auld	1
**Lisa Farnell**	**11**

B Side (Top half)
Julie O'Neill	6
**Kirsten Wall**	**8**
**Angie Melaney**	**8**
Colleen Madonia	6

Semifinals
**Lauren Mann**	**8**
Kirsten Wall	7
Angie Melaney	5
**Tracey Samaan**	**10**

Finals
Lauren Mann	4
**Tracey Samman**	**9**

B Side (Bottom half)
**Dianne Wylie**	**8**
Christine McCrady	4
**Debra Karbashewski**	**5**
Jaimee Gardner	3

Semifinals
**Janet McGhee**	**10**
Dianne Wylie	4
Debra Karbashewski	6
**Susan McKnight**	**7**

Finals
**Janet McGhee**	**5**
Susan McKnight	2

B Side		Semifinal		**Final**
				**Rachel Homan**	**8**
Kelly Cochrane	6			Cathy Auld	3
**Tracey Samaan**	**7**	Tracey Samaan	2
**Rachel Homan**	**10**	**Rachel Homan**	**7**
Janet McGhee	5

=== Regions 3&4 ===
January 7–9, St. Thomas Curling Club

A Side
13A	Brit O'Neal	5
16B	**Marika Bakewell**	**7**
14A	Kaylene Rundle	3
15B	**Tina Mazerolle**	**6**
16A	Ruth Alexander	4
13B	**Michelle Fletcher**	**7**
15A	**Heather Carr Olmstead**	**8**
14B	Lisa Moore	4
9A	**Christina Cadorin**	**9**
12B	Tracey Jones	8
10A	Jacqueline Harrison	5
11B	**Kerry Lackie**	**6**
12A	Kathy Brown	6
9B	**Alison Goring**	**7**
11A	Carrie Lindner	4
10B	**Sherry Middaugh**	**9**

Quarter-finals
**Marika Bakewell**	**8**
Tina Mazerolle	5
Michelle Fletcher	3
**Heather Carr Olmstead**	**7**
**Christina Cadorin**	**7**
Kerry Lackie	4
**Alison Goring**	**8**
Sherry Middaugh	5

Semi-finals
Marika Bakewell	5
**Heather Carr Olmstead**	**8**
Christina Cadorin	5
**Alison Goring**	**7**

Final
Heather Carr Olmstead	4
**Alison Goring**	**7**

B Side (Top half)
**Brit O'Neill**	**9**
Kaylene Rundle	8
Ruth Alexander	**9**
Lisa Moore	4

Semifinals
**Sherry Middaugh**	**9**
Brit O'Neill	4
Ruth Alexander	5
**Kerry Lackie**	**9**

Finals
**Sherry Middaugh**	**9**
Kerry Lackie	0

B Side (Bottom half)
Tracey Jones	4
**Jacqueline Harrison**	**8**
Kathy Brown	2
**Carrie Lindner**	**8**

Semifinals
Michelle Fletcher	4
**Jacqueline Harrison**	**8**
Tina Mazerolle	3
**Carrie Lindner**	**8**

Finals
**Jacqueline Harrison**	**8**
Carrie Lindner	1

B Side		Semifinal		**Final**
				**Marika Bakewell**	**8**
**Marika Bakewell**	**7**			Heather Carr Olmstead	7
Sherry Middaugh	3	**Marika Bakewell**	**8**
Christina Cadorin	5	Jacqueline Harrison	5
**Jacqueline Harrison**	**8**

=== Challenge Round ===
January 14–16, Orangeville Curling Club

Round of 16
**Jacqueline Harrison**	**9**
Laura Payne	6
**Kathy Brown**	**8**
Kirsten Wall	6
**Susan McKnight**	**13**
Jen Spencer	6
**Carrie Lindner**	**9**
Colleen Madonia	6
A5	**Julie Hastings**	**9**
A5	Katie Morrissey	4
A6	**Sherry Middaugh**	**9**
A6	Angie Melaney	6
A7	Tracey Samaan	8
A7	**Chrissie Cadorin**	**9**
A8	**Cathy Auld**	**9**
A8	Heather Marshall	3

Quarterfinals
A1	**Jacqueline Harrison**	**8**
A2	Kathy Brown	7
A3	**Susan McKnight**	**9**
A4	Carrie Lindner	2
A5	**Julie Hastings**	**10**
A6	Sherry Middaugh	8
A7	**Chrissie Cadorin**	**7**
A8	Cathy Auld	6

Semifinals
A9	Jacqueline Harrison	7
A10	**Susan McKnight**	**8**
A11	Julie Hastings	5
A12	**Chrissie Cadorin**	**6**

Finals
A13	Susan McKnight	5
A14	**Chrissie Cadorin**	**6**

B Side (Top half)
A1	Laura Payne	3
A2	**Kirsten Wall**	**7**
A3	Jen Spencer	3
A4	**Colleen Madonia**	**8**

Semifinals
A12	**Cathy Auld**	**9**
B1	Kirsten Wall	1
A11	**Sherry Middaugh**	**8**
B2	Colleen Madonia	3

Finals
B5	**Cathy Auld**	**8**
B6	Sherry Middaugh	6

B Side (Bottom half)
A5	Katie Morrissey	4
A6	**Angie Melaney**	**6**
A7	**Tracey Samaan**	**10**
A8	Heather Marshall	3

Semifinals
A10	Carrie Lindner	8
B3	**Angie Melaney**	**9**
A9	Kathy Brown	8
B4	**Tracey Samaan**	**10**

Finals
B7	**Angie Melaney**	**8**
B8	Tracey Samaan	7

B Side			Semifinal			**Final**
						A15	**Susan McKnight**	**9**
A13	Jacqueline Harrison	3				B13	Cathy Auld	5
B9	**Cathy Auld**	**7**	B11	**Cathy Auld**	**9**
A14	Julie Hastings	5	B12	Angie Melaney	7
B10	**Angie Melaney**	**7**

=== Northern Ontario Provincials ===
December 10–12 at the Nipigon Curling Club, Nipigon, Ontario

Entered teams:

- **Krista McCarville - Fort William**
- **Ashley Kallos - Fort William**
- **Marlo Dahl - Port Arthur**
- **Tracy Horgan - Idylwylde**
- Liane Fossum - Port Arthur
- Oye-Sem Won - Fort William
- Lisa Rouillard - Sudbury
- Rhonda Skillen - Port Arthur

A side

Quarterfinals
**McCarville**	**8**
Rouillard	5
**Skillen**	**7**
Fossum	4
**Dahl**	**7**
Won	5
Horgan	5
**Kallos**	**7**

Semifinals
**McCarville**	**9**
Skillen	7
Dahl	5
**Kallos**	**6**

A qualifier
**McCarville**	**9**
Kallos	7

B Side
Rouillard	6
**Fossum**	**8**
**Horgan**	**11**
Won	2

Quarterfinals
Fossum	4
**Dahl**	**11**
**Horgan**	**10**
Skillen	4

Semifinals
**Dahl**	**9**
Horgan	5

Finals
Dahl	2
**Kallos**	**8**

C1 Qualifier		Finals
Rouillard	4
**Skillen**	**8**	Skillen	6
		**Dahl**	**7**

C2 Qualifier		Finals
**Won**	**6**
Fossum	3	Won	3
		**Horgan**	**9**

In the championship game, McCarville defeated Kallos 7-1.
