= 2014 Ontario Scotties Tournament of Hearts =

- Host city: Sault Ste. Marie, Ontario
- Arena: Soo Curlers Association
- Dates: January 6–12
- Winner: Allison Flaxey
- Curling club: Listowel CC, Listowel
- Skip: Allison Flaxey
- Third: Katie Cottrill
- Second: Lynn Kreviazuk
- Lead: Morgan Court
- Finalist: Julie Hastings

The 2014 Ontario Scotties Tournament of Hearts, the provincial women's curling championship for Ontario, was held from January 6 to 12 at the Soo Curlers Association in Sault Ste. Marie, Ontario. The winning team represented Ontario at the 2014 Scotties Tournament of Hearts in Montreal.

The event marked the final tournament to include teams from Northern Ontario, which began to have its own entry into the Scotties beginning in 2015.

== Qualification Process ==
Ten teams qualify for the provincial tournament through several methods. Four teams qualified from Northern Ontario, two teams qualified from Regions 1 and 2, two teams qualified from regions 3 and 4 and two teams qualified from the Challenge Round.

The defending champion Rachel Homan did not need to participate in the qualification process, as she won the 2013 Scotties Tournament of Hearts and therefore represented Team Canada at the 2014 Scotties Tournament of Hearts.

Qualification method	Berths	Qualifying team
Northern Ontario Playdowns - 1st Place Finish	1	Tracy Horgan
Northern Ontario Playdowns - 2nd Place Finish	1	Ashley Kallos
Northern Ontario Playdowns - 3rd Place Finish	1	Kendra Lilly
Northern Ontario Playdowns - 4th Place Finish	1	Dawna Premo
Regions 1 & 2 Qualifiers	2	Hollie Nicol; Cathy Auld
Regions 3 & 4 Qualifiers	2	Allison Flaxey; Sherry Middaugh
Challenge Round Qualifiers	2	Julie Hastings; Julie Reddick

== Teams ==
Skip	Third	Second	Lead	Club(s)
Tracy Horgan	Jenn Horgan	Jenna Enge	Amanda Gates	Idylwylde Golf & Curling Club, Sudbury
Ashley Kallos	Oye-Sem Won	Laura Vieira	Jessica Williams	Fort William Curling Club, Thunder Bay
Kendra Lilly	Laura Forget	Courtney Chenier	Amanda Corkal	North Bay Granite Curling Club, North Bay
Dawna Premo	Lindsay Miners	Megan St. Amand	Michelle MacLeod	Soo Curlers Association, Sault Ste. Marie
Hollie Nicol	Stephanie LeDrew	Danielle Inglis	Courtney Davies	Donalda Curling Club, Don Mills, Toronto, Ontario
Cathy Auld	Janet Murphy	Stephanie Matheson	Melissa Foster	Mississaugua Golf & Country Club, Mississauga
Allison Flaxey	Katie Cottrill	Lynn Kreviazuk	Morgan Court	Listowel Curling Club, Listowel
Sherry Middaugh	Jo-Ann Rizzo	Lee Merklinger	Leigh Armstrong	Coldwater & District Curling Club, Coldwater
Julie Hastings	Cheryl McPherson	Stacey Smith	Katrina Collins	Bayview Country Club, Thornhill
Julie Reddick	Carrie Delahunt	Megan Balsdon	Laura Hickey	Blue Water Curling Club, Owen Sound

== Round-robin standings ==
Final round-robin standings

Key
Teams to Playoffs

Skip (Club)	W	L	PF	PA	Ends Won	Ends Lost	Blank Ends	Stolen Ends
Allison Flaxey (Listowel)	7	2	70	44	32	27	9	15
Julie Hastings (Bayview)	7	2	55	51	32	33	17	2
Julie Reddick (Blue Water)	6	3	48	48	35	32	12	9
Kendra Lilly (North Bay Granite)	6	3	64	50	38	34	10	10
Cathy Auld (Mississaugua)	5	4	58	51	40	33	7	11
Tracy Horgan (Idylwylde)	5	4	61	47	38	31	12	9
Sherry Middaugh (Coldwater)	4	5	46	52	31	37	14	6
Ashley Kallos (Fort William)	3	6	53	65	34	39	11	6
Hollie Nicol (Donalda)	2	7	53	65	34	37	10	9
Dawna Premo (Soo)	0	9	26	78	22	40	6	0

== Round-robin results ==
=== Draw 1 ===
Monday, January 6, 7:00 pm

Sheet 2	1	2	3	4	5	6	7	8	9	10	Final
Kendra Lilly	0	0	0	2	0	2	0	2	0	0	6
Julie Hastings 🔨	1	0	0	0	2	0	2	0	0	2	7

Sheet 3	1	2	3	4	5	6	7	8	9	10	Final
Julie Reddick	0	0	0	0	2	0	1	0	1	1	5
Tracy Horgan 🔨	0	0	0	1	0	1	0	2	0	0	4

Sheet 4	1	2	3	4	5	6	7	8	9	10	Final
Dawna Premo	0	1	0	0	0	0	X	X	X	X	1
Cathy Auld 🔨	1	0	3	1	2	1	X	X	X	X	8

Sheet 5	1	2	3	4	5	6	7	8	9	10	Final
Sherry Middaugh 🔨	0	0	0	0	1	0	2	0	2	X	5
Hollie Nicol	0	0	1	0	0	1	0	1	0	X	3

Sheet 6	1	2	3	4	5	6	7	8	9	10	Final
Ashley Kallos	0	0	1	1	1	0	0	0	2	0	5
Allison Flaxey 🔨	1	0	0	0	0	2	1	1	0	2	7

=== Draw 3 ===
Tuesday, January 7, 7:00 pm

Sheet 2	1	2	3	4	5	6	7	8	9	10	Final
Dawna Premo	0	0	1	0	0	2	0	0	X	X	3
Tracy Horgan 🔨	4	1	0	2	1	0	0	1	X	X	9

Sheet 3	1	2	3	4	5	6	7	8	9	10	11	Final
Hollie Nicol	0	0	3	0	0	1	0	0	2	0	0	6
Allison Flaxey 🔨	0	4	0	0	0	0	0	1	0	1	2	8

Sheet 4	1	2	3	4	5	6	7	8	9	10	11	Final
Sherry Middaugh	0	2	0	2	0	1	0	0	0	1	0	6
Julie Hastings 🔨	0	0	2	0	2	0	0	2	0	0	1	7

Sheet 5	1	2	3	4	5	6	7	8	9	10	Final
Ashley Kallos 🔨	0	1	0	3	1	0	1	0	3	X	9
Cathy Auld	0	0	1	0	0	2	0	1	0	X	4

Sheet 6	1	2	3	4	5	6	7	8	9	10	Final
Julie Reddick	0	0	1	1	0	1	0	0	2	1	6
Kendra Lilly 🔨	0	0	0	0	1	0	1	0	0	0	2

=== Draw 4 ===
Wednesday, January 8, 1:00 pm

Sheet 2	1	2	3	4	5	6	7	8	9	10	Final
Julie Hastings 🔨	0	1	0	2	0	2	1	0	0	1	7
Hollie Nicol	0	0	1	0	1	0	0	1	2	0	5

Sheet 3	1	2	3	4	5	6	7	8	9	10	Final
Dawna Premo	0	1	0	1	0	0	1	0	1	X	4
Julie Reddick 🔨	1	0	1	0	2	1	0	2	0	X	7

Sheet 4	1	2	3	4	5	6	7	8	9	10	Final
Tracy Horgan	0	2	0	2	3	0	3	X	X	X	10
Ashley Kallos 🔨	0	0	2	0	0	2	0	X	X	X	4

Sheet 5	1	2	3	4	5	6	7	8	9	10	Final
Kendra Lilly	0	1	0	0	1	0	1	0	1	1	5
Sherry Middaugh 🔨	1	0	2	0	0	2	0	1	0	0	6

Sheet 6	1	2	3	4	5	6	7	8	9	10	Final
Allison Flaxey	0	3	0	1	0	1	1	3	X	X	9
Cathy Auld 🔨	1	0	1	0	1	0	0	0	X	X	3

=== Draw 5 ===
Wednesday, January 8, 7:00 pm

Sheet 2	1	2	3	4	5	6	7	8	9	10	Final
Cathy Auld 🔨	1	0	0	2	1	0	1	0	1	X	6
Kendra Lilly	0	2	1	0	0	3	0	2	0	X	8

Sheet 3	1	2	3	4	5	6	7	8	9	10	Final
Sherry Middaugh 🔨	2	0	0	0	0	1	0	2	0	0	5
Ashley Kallos	0	1	0	1	1	0	1	0	3	1	8

Sheet 4	1	2	3	4	5	6	7	8	9	10	Final
Julie Reddick	0	1	0	0	0	0	X	X	X	X	1
Allison Flaxey 🔨	1	0	3	4	0	1	X	X	X	X	9

Sheet 5	1	2	3	4	5	6	7	8	9	10	Final
Julie Hastings	0	0	0	0	1	0	1	2	0	0	4
Tracy Horgan 🔨	0	0	1	0	0	1	0	0	1	0	3

Sheet 6	1	2	3	4	5	6	7	8	9	10	Final
Hollie Nicol 🔨	3	0	1	1	0	1	0	3	X	X	9
Dawna Premo	0	2	0	0	0	0	1	0	X	X	3

=== Draw 6 ===
Thursday, January 9, 9:00 am

Sheet 2	1	2	3	4	5	6	7	8	9	10	Final
Sherry Middaugh	0	0	0	0	0	X	X	X	X	X	0
Allison Flaxey 🔨	1	2	2	1	3	X	X	X	X	X	9

Sheet 3	1	2	3	4	5	6	7	8	9	10	Final
Kendra Lilly 🔨	3	0	1	0	2	2	X	X	X	X	8
Dawna Premo	0	1	0	1	0	0	X	X	X	X	2

Sheet 4	1	2	3	4	5	6	7	8	9	10	Final
Hollie Nicol	0	0	2	0	1	0	1	0	0	X	4
Tracy Horgan 🔨	3	1	0	1	0	1	0	1	2	X	9

Sheet 5	1	2	3	4	5	6	7	8	9	10	Final
Cathy Auld 🔨	2	0	3	0	1	1	0	2	X	X	9
Julie Reddick	0	1	0	1	0	0	1	0	X	X	3

Sheet 6	1	2	3	4	5	6	7	8	9	10	Final
Julie Hastings 🔨	0	1	0	2	0	4	0	2	0	X	9
Ashley Kallos	0	0	2	0	1	0	2	0	1	X	6

=== Draw 7 ===
Thursday, January 9, 1:00 pm

Sheet 2	1	2	3	4	5	6	7	8	9	10	Final
Hollie Nicol 🔨	1	0	2	0	1	0	0	X	X	X	4
Julie Reddick	0	3	0	2	0	0	5	X	X	X	10

Sheet 3	1	2	3	4	5	6	7	8	9	10	Final
Allison Flaxey	0	0	0	3	0	0	2	1	1	X	7
Julie Hastings 🔨	0	0	1	0	1	0	0	0	0	X	2

Sheet 4	1	2	3	4	5	6	7	8	9	10	Final
Cathy Auld	0	0	0	2	0	0	1	0	0	1	4
Sherry Middaugh 🔨	0	1	1	0	3	0	0	0	0	0	5

Sheet 5	1	2	3	4	5	6	7	8	9	10	11	Final
Dawna Premo 🔨	2	0	0	1	0	0	1	0	0	2	0	6
Ashley Kallos	0	2	0	0	1	0	0	0	3	0	1	7

Sheet 6	1	2	3	4	5	6	7	8	9	10	Final
Kendra Lilly 🔨	0	1	0	1	3	0	5	X	X	X	10
Tracy Horgan	0	0	3	0	0	1	0	X	X	X	4

=== Draw 2 ===
Friday, January 10, 9:00 am

The draw was postponed due to mechanical issues.

Sheet 2	1	2	3	4	5	6	7	8	9	10	Final
Julie Reddick	0	1	0	1	0	2	0	1	1	1	7
Ashley Kallos 🔨	1	0	1	0	2	0	0	0	0	0	4

Sheet 3	1	2	3	4	5	6	7	8	9	10	Final
Julie Hastings	0	2	0	0	2	0	0	1	0	X	5
Cathy Auld 🔨	2	0	1	2	0	1	2	0	0	X	8

Sheet 4	1	2	3	4	5	6	7	8	9	10	Final
Kendra Lilly 🔨	5	1	0	1	0	0	0	2	0	1	10
Hollie Nicol	0	0	1	0	2	1	1	0	2	0	7

Sheet 5	1	2	3	4	5	6	7	8	9	10	Final
Tracy Horgan	0	2	1	0	1	0	0	2	1	X	7
Allison Flaxey 🔨	1	0	0	1	0	1	0	0	0	X	3

Sheet 6	1	2	3	4	5	6	7	8	9	10	Final
Dawna Premo	0	0	0	1	0	1	0	X	X	X	2
Sherry Middaugh 🔨	2	1	2	0	1	0	3	X	X	X	9

=== Draw 8 ===
Friday, January 10, 2:00 pm

Sheet 2	1	2	3	4	5	6	7	8	9	10	11	Final
Tracy Horgan 🔨	1	0	1	0	1	0	0	1	0	2	0	6
Cathy Auld	0	1	0	0	0	1	3	0	1	0	2	8

Sheet 3	1	2	3	4	5	6	7	8	9	10	Final
Ashley Kallos	0	0	0	1	0	2	0	2	0	X	5
Hollie Nicol 🔨	2	0	1	0	3	0	2	0	2	X	10

Sheet 4	1	2	3	4	5	6	7	8	9	10	Final
Julie Hastings 🔨	3	0	3	0	4	X	X	X	X	X	10
Dawna Premo	0	1	0	1	0	X	X	X	X	X	2

Sheet 5	1	2	3	4	5	6	7	8	9	10	11	Final
Allison Flaxey 🔨	0	2	0	1	0	0	3	0	1	0	0	7
Kendra Lilly	0	0	2	0	1	1	0	2	0	1	1	8

Sheet 6	1	2	3	4	5	6	7	8	9	10	Final
Sherry Middaugh 🔨	0	1	0	1	0	0	0	1	1	0	4
Julie Reddick	0	0	1	0	1	0	1	0	0	2	5

=== Draw 9 ===
Friday, January 10, 7:30 pm

Sheet 2	1	2	3	4	5	6	7	8	9	10	Final
Allison Flaxey 🔨	2	0	1	0	2	0	2	4	X	X	11
Dawna Premo	0	0	0	1	0	2	0	0	X	X	3

Sheet 3	1	2	3	4	5	6	7	8	9	10	Final
Tracy Horgan 🔨	1	0	0	1	0	2	0	4	0	1	9
Sherry Middaugh	0	1	1	0	1	0	2	0	1	0	6

Sheet 4	1	2	3	4	5	6	7	8	9	10	Final
Ashley Kallos 🔨	2	0	0	1	0	0	0	0	2	X	5
Kendra Lilly	0	2	0	0	2	1	1	1	0	X	7

Sheet 5	1	2	3	4	5	6	7	8	9	10	Final
Julie Reddick	0	1	0	0	1	0	1	0	1	X	4
Julie Hastings 🔨	2	0	1	0	0	2	0	3	0	X	8

Sheet 6	1	2	3	4	5	6	7	8	9	10	Final
Cathy Auld 🔨	2	0	0	1	0	1	1	1	0	2	8
Hollie Nicol	0	2	1	0	1	0	0	0	1	0	5

== Playoffs ==
Page playoff system
1	Allison Flaxey	3
2	Julie Hastings	8
3	Julie Reddick	7
4	Kendra Lilly	6

Semifinal
1	Allison Flaxey	8
3	Julie Reddick	2

Final
2	Julie Hastings	5
1	Allison Flaxey	7

=== 1 vs. 2 ===
Saturday, January 11, 2:00 pm

Team	1	2	3	4	5	6	7	8	9	10	Final
Allison Flaxey 🔨	0	0	1	0	1	0	1	X	X	X	3
Julie Hastings	1	1	0	5	0	1	0	X	X	X	8

=== 3 vs. 4 ===
Saturday, January 11, 7:00 pm

Team	1	2	3	4	5	6	7	8	9	10	11	Final
Julie Reddick 🔨	1	0	0	2	0	1	1	0	1	0	1	7
Kendra Lilly	0	0	1	0	3	0	0	1	0	1	0	6

=== Semifinal ===
Sunday, January 12, 9:30 am

Team	1	2	3	4	5	6	7	8	9	10	Final
Allison Flaxey 🔨	0	1	2	0	3	1	0	1	X	X	8
Julie Reddick	0	0	0	1	0	0	1	0	X	X	2

=== Final ===
Sunday, January 12, 4:00 pm

Team	1	2	3	4	5	6	7	8	9	10	Final
Julie Hastings 🔨	0	1	0	1	0	1	0	2	0	X	5
Allison Flaxey	2	0	2	0	1	0	1	0	1	X	7

2014 Ontario Scotties Tournament of Hearts

Allison Flaxey
1st Ontario Provincial Championship title

== Qualification ==
Southern Ontario zones ran from November 22-December 8, 2013. Two teams from each zone qualify to 2 regional tournaments, and two teams from each of the two tournaments qualify to provincials. Two additional teams qualify out of a second chance qualifier.

The Northern Ontario provincial championship occur from December 13 to 15 in 2013 at the Soo Curlers Association in Sault Ste. Marie, Ontario. Four teams qualify out of the Northern Ontario championship.

Regional Qualifiers In Bold

=== Southern Ontario Zone Qualification ===
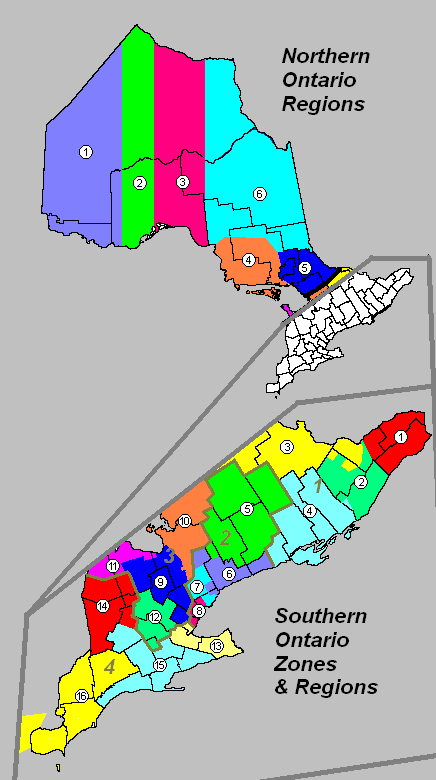
Zone Map

==== Zone 1 ====
December 6–8, at the RCMP Curling Club, Ottawa

Teams entered:

- **Katie Morrissey** (Ottawa) (automatically qualifies as only team)

==== Zone 2 ====
December 6–8, at the RCMP Curling Club, Ottawa

Teams entered:

- **Laura Payne** (Rideau) (qualifies due to lack of entries in Zone 1)
- **Samantha Peters** (Rideau)
- Jacqueline Lavoie (Rideau)
- **Rhonda Varnes** (Rideau)

==== Zone 3 ====
December 7, at the Carleton Heights Curling Club, Ottawa

Teams entered:

- **Brit O'Neill** (City View)
- **Lauren Mann** (Pakenham)

Both teams qualify as there were no other entries.

==== Zone 4 ====
December 8, at the Trenton Curling Club, Trenton

Teams entered:

- **Lindsay McKeown** (Cataraqui)
- **Lisa Farnell** (Loonie)

Both teams qualify as there were no other entries.

==== Zone 5 ====
December 7 at the Lindsay Curling Club, Lindsay

Teams entered:

- **Angie Melaney** (Lakefield)
- **Julie O'Neill** (Lindsay)
- **Emma Joyce** (Lindsay) (qualifies due to lack of entries in Zone 6)

==== Zone 6 ====
December 7–8 Port Perry Community Curling Club, Port Perry

Teams entered:

- **Susan McKnight** (Uxbridge) (automatically qualifies as only team)

==== Zone 7 ====
November 23–24, at the Thornhill Country Club, Thornhill

Teams entered:

- **Julie Hastings** (Bayview)
- **Hollie Nicol** (Donalda) (qualifies due to lack of entries in Zone 8)
- Courtney de Winter (Richmond Hill)
- **Chrissy Cadorin** (Thornhill)

==== Zone 8 ====
November 23–24 at the Mississaugua Golf & Country Club, Mississauga

- **Cathy Auld** (Mississaugua) (automatically qualifies as only team)

==== Zone 9 ====
December 7–8, at the Milton Curling Club, Milton

Teams entered:

- **Heather Graham** (King)
- **Marika Bakewell** (Markdale)

Both teams qualify as there were no other entries.

==== Zone 10 ====
November 23 at the Penetanguishene Curling Club, Penetanguishene

Teams entered:

- Joanne Gill (Parry Sound)
- **Sarah Picton** (Stroud)
- **Sherry Middaugh** (Coldwater)

==== Zone 11 ====
November 22–24 at the Meaford Curling Club, Meaford

Teams entered:

- **Julie Reddick** (Blue Water) (automatically qualifies as only team)

==== Zone 12 ====
December 7 at the Fergus Curling Club, Fergus

Teams entered:

- **Kristy Russell** (Elora)
- **Sheri Smeltzer** (Fergus)
- Taylor Mellor (Kitchener-Waterloo Granite)
- **Jen Spencer** (Westmount) (qualifies due to lack of entries in Zone 11)

==== Zone 13 ====
December 8, at the Glendale Golf & Country Club, Hamilton

Teams entered:

- **Michelle Fletcher** (Burlington)
- **Ashley Waye** (Glendale)

Both teams qualify as there were no other entries.

==== Zone 14 ====
December 8, at the Palmerston Curling Club, Palmerston

Teams entered:

- **Jamiee Gardner** (Listowel)
- **Allison Flaxey** (Listowel)

Both teams qualify as there were no other entries.

==== Zone 15 ====
December 7, at the St. Thomas Curling Club, St. Thomas

Teams entered:

- **Jacqueline Harrison** (Brant)
- **Chantal Lalonde** (Woodstock)
- Heather Carr-Olmstead (Norwich)

==== Zone 16 ====
December 6–8, at the Sun Parlour Curling Club, Leamington

Teams entered:

- **Dianne Dykstra** (Chatham-Granite)
- **Bethany Heinrichs** (Ilderton)

Both teams qualify as there were no other entries.

=== Regions 1 & 2 ===
December 13–15 at the Cataraqui Golf & Country Club, Kingston

A side
1A	**Katie Morrissey**	**10**
6B	Emma Joyce	4
2A	**Rhonda Varnes**	**5**
3B	Brit O'Neill	4
3A	Lauren Mann	0
8B	**Hollie Nicol**	**11**
4A	Lindsay McKeown	7
7B	**Chrissy Cadorin**	**10**
5A	Angie Melaney	4
2B	**Samantha Peters**	**5**
6A	**Susan McKnight**	**6**
1B	Laura Payne	5
8A	**Cathy Auld**	**10**
3B	Brit O'Neill	8
7A	Julie Hastings	4
4B	**Lisa Farnell**	**7**

Quarterfinal
1A	**Katie Morrissey**	**7**
2A	Rhonda Varnes	4
8B	**Hollie Nicol**	**7**
7B	Chrissy Cadorin	2
2B	Samantha Peters	6
6A	**Susan McKnight**	**7**
8A	**Cathy Auld**	**7**
4B	Lisa Farnell	4

Semifinal
1A	Katie Morrissey	6
8B	**Hollie Nicol**	**7**
6A	Susan McKnight	5
8A	**Cathy Auld**	**8**

Final
8B	**Hollie Nicol**	**8**
8A	Cathy Auld	5

B Side (Top half)
6B	Emma Joyce	4
5B	**Julie O'Neill**	**9**
3A	**Lauren Mann**	**10**
4A	Lindsay McKeown	3

Semifinals
4B	**Lisa Farnell**	**9**
5B	Julie O'Neill	3
2B	Samantha Peters	4
3A	**Lauren Mann**	**8**

Finals
4B	Lisa Farnell	2
3A	**Lauren Mann**	**9**

B Side (Bottom half)
7A	**Julie Hastings**	**7**
3B	Brit O'Neill	2
5A	**Angie Melaney**	**7**
1B	Laura Payne	4

Semifinals
2A	**Rhonda Varnes**	**9**
7A	Julie Hastings	8
7B	**Chrissy Cadorin**	**8**
5A	Angie Melaney	7

Finals
2A	**Rhonda Varnes**	**5**
7B	Chrissy Cadorin	4

B Side			Semifinal			**Final**
						2A	Rhonda Varnes	2
3A	**Lauren Mann**	**8**				8A	**Cathy Auld**	**9**
1A	Katie Morrissey	7	3A	Lauren Mann	3
2A	**Rhonda Varnes**	**7**	2A	**Rhonda Varnes**	**6**
6A	Susan McKnight	4

=== Regions 3 & 4 ===
December 14–16, Guelph Curling Club, Guelph.

A side
9A	Heather Graham	5
14B	**Jaimee Gardner**	**8**
10A	**Sherry Middaugh**	**6**
13B	Michelle Fletcher	4
11A	Julie Reddick	6
16B	**Dianne Dykstra**	**7**
12A	**Kristy Russell**	**11**
15B	Chantal Lalonde	3
13A	**Ashley Waye**	**6**
10B	Sarah Picton	0
14A	**Allison Flaxey**	**8**
9B	Marika Bakewell	6
15A	**Jacqueline Harrison**	**11**
12B	Sheri Smeltzer	5
16A	**Bethany Heinrichs**	**12**
11B	Jen Spencer	5

Quarterfinal
14B	Jaimee Gardner	3
10A	**Sherry Middaugh**	**8**
16B	Dianne Dykstra	2
12A	**Kristy Russell**	**10**
13A	Ashley Waye	2
14A	**Allison Flaxey**	**7**
15A	**Jacqueline Harrison**	**8**
16A	Bethany Heinrichs	6

Semifinal
10A	**Sherry Middaugh**	**8**
12A	Kristy Russell	4
14A	**Allison Flaxey**	**10**
15A	Jacqueline Harrison	4

Final
10A	Sherry Middaugh	10
14A	**Allison Flaxey**	**11**

B Side (Top half)
9A	**Heather Graham**	**10**
13B	Michelle Fletcher	2
11A	**Julie Reddick**	**7**
15B	Chantal Lalonde	6

Semifinals
16A	Bethany Heinrichs	3
9A	**Heather Graham**	**10**
13A	Ashley Waye	5
11A	**Julie Reddick**	**8**

Finals
9A	Heather Graham	4
11A	**Julie Reddick**	**9**

B Side (Bottom half)
10B	Sarah Picton	4
9B	**Marika Bakewell**	**9**
12B	Sheri Smeltzer	5
11B	**Jen Spencer**	**6**

Semifinals
16B	Dianne Dykstra	7
9B	**Marika Bakewell**	**9**
14B	Jaimee Gardner	2
11B	**Jen Spencer**	**10**

Finals
9B	**Marika Bakewell**	**6**
11B	Jen Spencer	5

B Side			Semifinal			**Final**
						12A	Kristy Russell	7
11A	Julie Reddick	7				10A	**Sherry Middaugh**	**9**
12A	**Kristy Russell**	**8**	12A	**Kristy Russell**	**7**
9B	**Marika Bakewell**	**8**	9B	Marika Bakewell	4
15A	Jacqueline Harrison	6

=== Challenge Round ===
December 20–22, Bradford & District Curling Club, Bradford

A Side
Marika Bakewell	8
**Chrissy Cadorin**	**10**
**Kristy Russell**	**11**
Courtney de Winter	7
6	Susan McKnight	4
11	**Chantal Lalonde**	**7**
7	**Brit O'Neill**	**9**
10	Jen Spencer	3

Quarterfinals
1	**Julie Hastings**	**7**
9	Chrissy Cadorin	6
5	**Julie Reddick**	**9**
4	Kristy Russell	4
3	Lisa Farnell	1
11	**Chantal Lalonde**	**10**
7	Brit O'Neill	3
2	**Jacqueline Harrison**	**8**

Semifinals
1	**Julie Hastings**	**8**
5	Julie Reddick	5
11	Chantal Lalonde	5
2	**Jacqueline Harrison**	**10**

Finals
1	**Julie Hastings**	**7**
2	Jacqueline Harrison	6

B Side
Brit O'Neill	6
**Marika Bakewell**	**7**
**Lisa Farnell**	**7**
Courtney de Winter	3
4	Kristy Russell	7
6	**Susan McKnight**	**8**
9	Chrissy Cadorin	7
10	**Jen Spencer**	**9**

Quarterfinals
8	**Marika Bakewell**	**7**
3	Lisa Farnell	4
6	**Susan McKnight**	**9**
10	Jen Spencer	6

Semifinals
8	Marika Bakewell	4
5	**Julie Reddick**	**8**
6	Susan McKnight	5
11	**Chantal Lalonde**	**6**

Finals
5	**Julie Reddick**	**8**
11	Chantal Lalonde	2
**Final**
2	Jacqueline Harrison	3
5	**Julie Reddick**	**9**

== Northern Ontario Provincials ==
The Northern Ontario provincial championship was held from December 13–15 at the Soo Curlers Association in Sault Ste. Marie.

=== Round-robin standings ===
Key
Teams to Provincials

Skip	W	L
Tracy Horgan (Idylwylde)	4	0
Ashley Kallos (Fort William)	3	1
Kendra Lilly (North Bay Granite)	2	2
Dawna Premo (Soo)	1	3
Liane Fossum (Port Arthur)	0	4

Scores

- Kallos 6-4 Lilly
- Horgan 10-6 Fossum
- Premo 7-5 Fossum
- Horgan 7-5 Lilly
- Horgan 9-8 Kallos
- Lilly 8-3 Premo
- Lilly 9-5 Forrum
- Kallos 7-5 Premo
- Horgan 9-3 Premo
- Kallos 10-4 Fossum
