= Courtesy Freight Northern Ontario Superspiel =

The Courtesy Freight Northern Ontario Superspiel was an annual bonspiel, or curling tournament, that was held annually in November at the Port Arthur Curling Club in Thunder Bay, Ontario. The tournament was one of the development series events introduced on the World Curling Tour during the 2012–13 curling season. The tournament was held in a round robin format. The tournament started in 2012 as part of the World Curling Tour, but was held earlier as an Ontario Curling Tour Event. It was discontinued after 2013.

A women's event existed for just one season, in 2012.

== Past champions ==
Only skip's name is displayed.

=== Men ===
Year	Winning skip	Runner up skip	Purse (CAD)
2010	(Wisconsin) Craig Brown	(Ontario) Mike Pozihun	$16,000
2011	(Ontario) Colin Koivula	(Minnesota) Tyler George	$16,000
2012	(Ontario) Al Hackner	(Ontario) Craig Kochan	$15,000
2013	(Ontario) Tervor Bonot	(Ontario) Bryan Burgess	$15,000

=== Women ===
Year	Winning skip	Runner up skip	Purse (CAD)
2012	(Ontario) Krista McCarville	(Ontario) Ashley Kallos	$6,000
