= 2012 Courtesy Freight Northern Ontario Superspiel =

- Host city: Thunder Bay, Ontario
- Arena: Port Arthur Curling Club
- Dates: November 9–11
- Men's winner: (Ontario) Al Hackner
- Skip: Al Hackner
- Third: Kory Carr
- Second: Kristofer Leupen
- Lead: Gary Champagne
- Finalist: (Ontario) Craig Kochan
- Women's winner: (Ontario) Krista McCarville
- Skip: Krista McCarville
- Third: Ashley Miharija
- Second: Kari Lavoie
- Lead: Sarah Lang
- Finalist: (Ontario) Ashley Kallos

The 2012 Courtesy Freight Northern Ontario Superspiel was held from November 9 to 11 at the Port Arthur Curling Club in Thunder Bay, Ontario as part of the 2012–13 World Curling Tour. The event was held in a round robin format. The purse for the men's event was CAD$15,000, of which the winner, Al Hackner, received CAD$5,000, and the purse for the women's event was CAD$6,000. Hackner defeated Craig Kochan in the men's final with a score of 7–5, while Krista McCarville defeated Ashley Kallos in the women's final with a score of 5–2.

== Men ==
=== Teams ===
The teams are listed as follows:

Skip	Third	Second	Lead	Locale
Brian Adams, Jr.	Michael Makela	Andy Peloza	Phil Kennedy	Thunder Bay, Ontario
Mike Assad	Ben Mikkelsen	Jordan Potts	Mike Davis	Thunder Bay, Ontario
Trevor Bonot	Allen Macsemchuk	Chris Briand	Tim Jewett	Thunder Bay, Ontario
Bryan Burgess	Mike Pozihun	Dale Weirsema	Pat Berezoski	Thunder Bay, Ontario
Kurtis Byrd	Isaac Keffer	Josh Szajewski	Mike Zsakai	Thunder Bay, Ontario
Jeff Currie	Mike McCarville	Colin Koivula	Jamie Childs	Thunder Bay, Ontario
Eric Fenson	Trevor Andrews	Blake Morton	Calvin Weber	Bemidji, Minnesota
Pete Fenson	Shawn Rojeski	Joe Polo	Ryan Brunt	Bemidji, Minnesota
Kyle Foster	Wes Jonasson	Rodney Legault	Darcy Jacobs	Arborg, Manitoba
Christopher Plys (fourth)	Tyler George (skip)	Rich Ruohonen	Colin Hufman	Duluth, Minnesota
Al Hackner	Kory Carr	Kristofer Leupen	Gary Champagne	Thunder Bay, Ontario
Evan Jensen	Daniel Metcalf	Dan Ruehl	Steve Gebauer	St. Paul, Minnesota
Dylan Johnston	Cody Johnston	Travis Showalter	Jay Turner	Thunder Bay, Ontario
Craig Kochan	Matt Dumontelle	John McClelland		Thunder Bay, Ontario
Ron Kowalchuk	Ed Pedersen	Ernie Surkan	John Bird	Thunder Bay, Ontario
Art Lappalainen	Ron Rosengren	Tim Warkentin	Larry Rathjie	Thunder Bay, Ontario
Ryan Lemke	Nathan Gebert	John Lilla	Casey Konopacky	Medford, Wisconsin
Jeff MacDonald	Greg Doran	Brendan Berbenuik	Phil Tribe	Thunder Bay, Ontario
Russ Mellerup	Dan Kukko	Ron Evans	Mike Rutledge	Thunder Bay, Ontario
Joe Scharf	Trevor Clifford	Aaron Skillen	Bill Peloza	Thunder Bay, Ontario
Steen Sigurdson	Riley Smith	Ian McMillan	Nick Curtis	Winnipeg, Manitoba
Brennan Wark	Jordan Potter	Kyle Toset	Joel Adams	Thunder Bay, Ontario
Zach Warkentin	Matt Roberts	Mackenzie Joblin	Will Perozak	Thunder Bay, Ontario
Gary Weiss	Deron Surkan	Aaron Rogalski	Mark Beazley	Thunder Bay, Ontario

=== Round-robin standings ===
Final round-robin standings

Key
Teams to Playoffs

Pool A	W	L
(Minnesota) Pete Fenson	4	1
(Ontario) Brennan Wark	4	1
(Ontario) Bryan Burgess	3	1
(Ontario) Brian Adams, Jr.	2	2
(Ontario) Jeff MacDonald	1	4
(Ontario) Ron Kowalchuk	0	5

Pool B	W	L
(Ontario) Art Lappalainen	5	0
(Ontario) Mike Assad	3	2
(Ontario) Trevor Bonot	2	2
(Ontario) Joe Scharf	2	2
(Minnesota) Eric Fenson	1	4
(Manitoba) Steen Sigurdson	1	4

Pool C	W	L
(Ontario) Craig Kochan	5	0
(Ontario) Gary Weiss	3	2
(Minnesota) Tyler George	3	2
(Ontario) Dylan Johnston	3	2
(Ontario) Ross Mellerup	1	4
(Ontario) Zach Warkentin	0	5

Pool D	W	L
(Ontario) Jeff Currie	5	0
(Ontario) Al Hackner	4	1
(Ontario) Kurtis Byrd	3	2
(Ontario) Kyle Foster	2	3
(Minnesota) Evan Jensen	1	4
(Wisconsin) Ryan Lemke	0	5

=== Playoffs ===
The playoffs draw is listed as follows:

Quarterfinals
(Ontario) Brennan Wark	1
(Ontario) Greg Wiess	7
(Ontario) Art Lappalainen	3
(Ontario) Al Hackner	6
(Ontario) Jeff Currie	3
(Minnesota) Pete Fenson	5
(Ontario) Craig Kochan	5
(Ontario) Mike Assad	2

Semifinals
(Ontario) Greg Wiess	4
(Ontario) Al Hackner	5
(Minnesota) Pete Fenson	2
(Ontario) Craig Kochan	4

Final
(Ontario) Al Hackner	7
(Ontario) Craig Kochan	5

== Women ==
=== Teams ===
The teams are listed as follows:

Skip	Third	Second	Lead	Locale
Marian Clarke	Barb Ward	Tanis Ferguson	Bev Junnila	Thunder Bay, Ontario
Marlo Dahl	Angela Lee-Wiwcharyk	Steph Davis	Kim Zsakai	Thunder Bay, Ontario
Liane Fossum	Shana Marchessault	Victoria Anderson	Lisa Auld	Thunder Bay, Ontario
Rebecca Hamilton	Molly Bonner	Tara Peterson	Sophie Brorson	Madison, Wisconsin
Ashley Kallos	Oye-Sem Won	Larissa Mikkelson	Jessica Williams	Thunder Bay, Ontario
Tirzah Keffer	Megan Westlund	Sheree Hinz	Rachel Camlin	Thunder Bay, Ontario
Krista McCarville	Ashley Miharija	Kari Lavoie	Sarah Lang	Thunder Bay, Ontario
Miranda Solem	Vicky Persenger	Karlie Koenig	Chelsea Solem	Cohasset, Minnesota
Megan St. Amand	Grace Esquega	Kathleen Murray	Paige Rubenick	Northern Ontario
Kimberly Wapola	Cynthia Eng-Dinsel	Carol Strojny	Ann Flis	St. Paul, Minnesota

=== Round-robin standings ===
Final round-robin standings

Key
Teams to Playoffs

Pool A	W	L
(Ontario) Krista McCarville	4	0
(Ontario) Marlo Dahl	3	1
(Ontario) Tirzah Keffer	2	2
(Ontario) Marian Clarke	1	3
(Minnesota) Kimberly Wapola	0	4

Pool B	W	L
(Ontario) Ashley Kallos	4	0
(Wisconsin) Rebecca Hamilton	3	1
(Minnesota) Miranda Solem	1	3
(Ontario) Liane Fossum	1	3
(Ontario) Megan St. Amand	1	3

=== Playoffs ===
The playoffs draw is listed as follows:

Semifinals
1	(Ontario) Krista McCarville	7
4	(Wisconsin) Rebecca Hamilton	3
3	(Ontario) Ashley Kallos	4
2	(Ontario) Marlo Dahl	3

Final
(Ontario) Krista McCarville	5
(Ontario) Ashley Kallos	2
