= Hamilton Victoria Club =

Curling club in Hamilton, Ontario, Canada

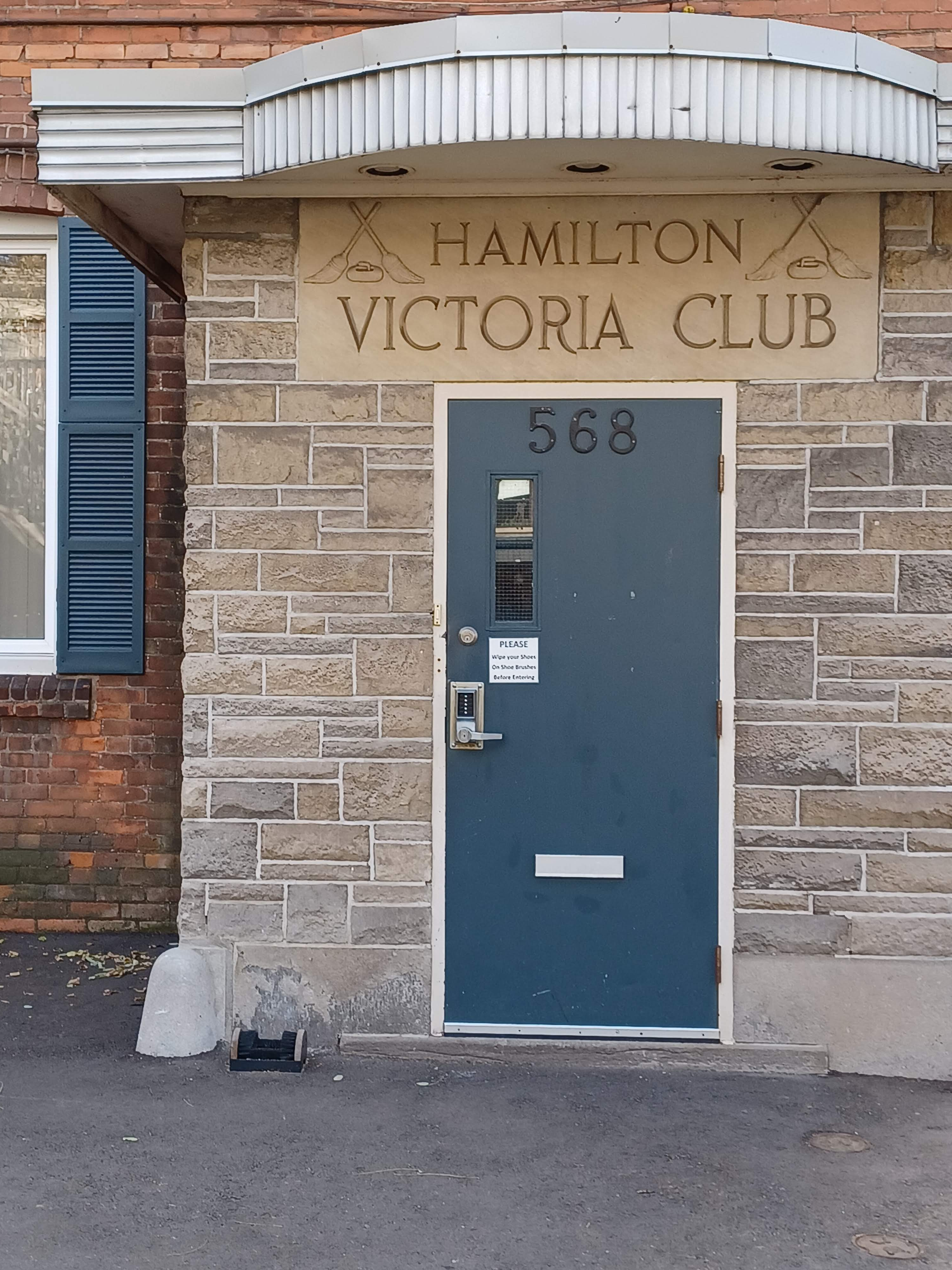
- Entrance to the Hamilton Victoria Club
- Arena: 568 King Street East; Hamilton, Ontario

Information
- Established: 1867
- Club type: Dedicated Ice
- Curling Canada region: OCA Zone 13
- Sheets of ice: 4
- Rock colours: Blue and Yellow
- Website: hamiltonvictoriaclub.com

The Hamilton Victoria Club, also known as the Hamilton Victoria Curling Club or simply "The Vic", is a curling club in Hamilton, Ontario, Canada. Founded in 1867, it is the oldest continuously operating sporting organization in Hamilton and one of the oldest curling clubs in Canada.

== History ==
The club was founded in 1867 as the Hamilton Mechanics Club, a name that the club retained through the 1880/1881 curling season. Historically, it has functioned as a multi-sport facility, including activities such as lawn bowling, figure skating, and hockey. The club has operated in the same building for many years, a structure noted for its long history and various adaptations over time.

In October 1881, the club was renamed to become the Hamilton Caledonian Club. With membership increasing, the club purchased land for the construction of a new rink on Victoria Avenue and, in 1890, renamed again to become the Victoria Curling Rink, Company of Hamilton (Limited).

=== Recent history ===
In 2017, The Vic commemorated its 150th anniversary with a gala event at LIUNA Station.

The club's 2019–20 season was postponed and later canceled when an ammonia issue led to the club's chiller system needing to be replaced. The club was then disrupted due to the COVID-19 pandemic.

== Leagues ==
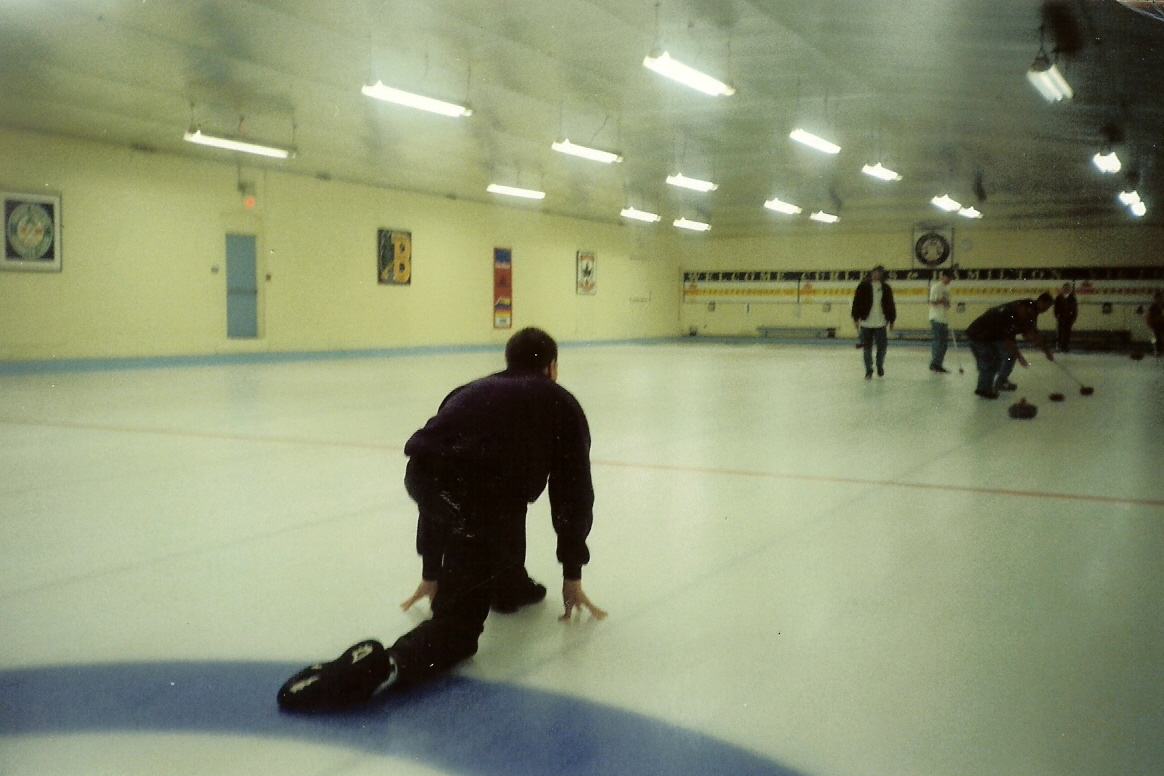
Curling at the Hamilton Victoria Club

As of the 2023–24 curling season, the Hamilton Victoria Club runs a wide range of leagues including an Open "Choose Your Own Team" league (Tuesdays and Wednesdays), a Mixed Competitive "Choose Your Own Team" league (Sundays), a Mixed (Open) Recreational league (Mondays), Day Ladies (Tuesdays), Day Men (Tuesdays), a Friday Social Recreational league, and a Two Person Stick league (Mondays). In addition, the club has ice for open daytime curling and youth curling. The club also welcomes two rental leagues and hosts several bonspiels throughout the season.

The club has also allowed its facilities to be used for the Little Rocks Curling Program supported by the Rotary Club.

== Sources ==
- "Hamilton Victoria Curling Club". Hamilton and District Curling Association. Archived from the original on September 27, 2023.
