= Julie Hastings =

Canadian curler

- Curler
- Born: September 5, 1975 (age 51); North York, Ontario

Team
- Curling club: Bayview G&CC, Thornhill, ON
- Skip: Julie Hastings
- Third: Christy Trombley
- Second: Stacey Smith
- Lead: Katrina Sale

Curling career
- Member Association: Ontario
- Hearts: 1 (2015)
- Top CTRS ranking: 10th (2014–15)

Julie Hastings (born September 5, 1975 in North York as Julie Anderson) is a Canadian curler from Stouffville, Ontario.

== Career ==
As a junior curler, Hastings won the 1992 Ontario Junior Mixed Championship playing third for skip Brad Savage. In 1994, she won the Toronto Curling Association Junior bonspiel. She lost the final of the 1995 Ontario Junior Curling Championships to Kirsten Harmark. At just 19, Hastings made it to the 1995 Ontario Scott Tournament of Hearts.

On the Women's World Curling Tour circuit, Hastings' team has won the Brampton Bacardi Cashspiel in 2005, the Sun Life Invitational in 2007, the Brampton Curling Classic in 2009, the Stu Sells Toronto Tankard in 2010, the KW Fall Classic in 2009, 2011, 2013, and 2014, the Mount Lawn Gord Carroll Classic in 2013, and the Stroud Sleeman Cash Spiel in 2012 and 2014.

Hastings has been with the same team since 1994. In 1995, they lost in the final of the Ontario Scotties Tournament of Hearts to Alison Goring.

Hastings' team finished third at the 2009 Ontario Scotties Tournament of Hearts and out of the playoffs at the 2010 Ontario Scotties Tournament of Hearts.

Hastings played in her first Grand Slam event at the 2010 Players' Championships. After winning her first game, she lost three straight, eliminating her team. Her second Grand Slam event was the 2011 Manitoba Lotteries Women's Curling Classic. The team won three games before being eliminated. The team played in their third Slam at the 2012 The Masters Grand Slam of Curling. Hastings won just one match in the event.

Hastings would not make it to another provincial championship until 2013. At the 2013 Ontario Scotties Tournament of Hearts, she led her team to a 5–4 round robin record, losing to Sherry Middaugh in a tie breaker match. Her team had more success at the 2014 Ontario Scotties Tournament of Hearts. They finished the round robin tied for first place with a 7–2 record. They beat Allison Flaxey in their first playoff game, but lost to the Flaxey rink in a re-match in the final. Hastings played in her fourth Grand Slam of her career at the 2014 Players' Championship. There, her rink won just one game, failing to qualify for the playoffs.

Hastings won the 2015 Ontario Scotties Tournament of Hearts, beating Sherry Middaugh 9–5 in the final. At the 2015 Scotties Tournament of Hearts, they finished with a 5–6 record.

== Personal life ==
Hastings attended the Markville Secondary School in Markham and attended Trent University in Peterborough, Ontario. She works as the curling manager for the Bayview Golf & Country Club in Thornhill. She is married to Steve Hastings and has two children. Christy Trombley, who plays third on her team, is her twin sister.

== Grand Slam record ==
Event	2009–10	2010–11	2011–12	2012–13	2013-14	2014-15
Autumn Gold	DNP	DNP	DNP	DNP	DNP	DNP
Colonial Square	N/A	N/A	N/A	DNP	DNP	DNP
Canadian Open	N/A	N/A	N/A	N/A	N/A	Q
The Masters Grand Slam of Curling	N/A	N/A	N/A	Q	DNP	DNP
Players' Championships	Q	DNP	DNP	DNP	Q	DNP

=== Former events ===
Event	2011–12
Manitoba Liquor & Lotteries	Q
