= Marlo Dahl =

Canadian curler

Marlo Dahl (born October 21, 1972, in Nipigon, Ontario) is a Canadian curler and singer. Dahl skips a team on the Women's World Curling Tour representing the Port Arthur Curling Club in Thunder Bay.

Dahl is a perennial skip at the Ontario Scotties Tournament of Hearts. She has played in six provincial championships, including 2006, 2010, 2011, 2012 and 2013. She has played in three World Curling Tour events in her career, the 2006 Labatt Cash Spiel, the 2012 Courtesy Freight Northern Ontario Superspiel and the 2012 Molson Cash Spiel.

Outside of curling, Dahl is a Catholic school teacher at St. Edward Elementary in Nipigon. She is also a singer in the band "Thunder Bay Legends", which impersonates famous singers. Dahl, an Ojibwe, is a member of the Nipigon First Nation and is fluent in the Ojibwe language and Oji-Cree.
