= Ashley Kallos =

Canadian curler

- Curler

Team
- Curling club: Fort William CC, Thunder Bay

Curling career
- Member Association: Northern Ontario
- Hearts: 0

Ashley Kallos is a Canadian curler from Thunder Bay, Ontario.

As a junior, Kallos only played in one Northern Ontario provincial junior championship, in 2000 but did not win. She has played in two provincial mixed championships, losing in the final in 2006 and winning in 2012 playing third with Mike Assad as skip. Along with Assad, Tayler Kallos and Kady Stachiw, she will represent Northern Ontario at the 2013 Canadian Mixed Curling Championship to be played in November 2012.

In addition to her success in Northern Ontario, Kallos has participated in three Ontario Scotties Tournament of Hearts (there is no Northern Ontario provincial in women's curling). Her first provincial Hearts was in 2004, playing second for Kirsta Scharf (McCarville). The rink finished 3–6, missing the playoffs. Kallos returned to the provincial Hearts in 2007 playing second for Michele Boland. That team finished 3–6 as well, missing the playoffs. Kallos returned in 2011 this time as a skip, but once again finished 3-6 and out of the playoffs.
