= Marika Bakewell =

Canadian curler

- Curler
- Born: August 14, 1985 (age 41); Seoul, South Korea

Curling career
- Member Association: Ontario

Marika Bakewell (born August 14, 1985) is a Canadian curler who resides in London, Ontario.

Bakewell grew up in Mississauga, Ontario. In 2005, she became only the second female to skip a team to win the Ontario Junior Mixed Curling Championship.

In 2005 and 2007 she skipped the University of Waterloo to Gold Medal finishes at the OUAA Championships and had strong appearances at the Canadian University Curling Championships where she won a Bronze Medal in 2005 and Silver Medal in 2007 - losing the championship final to the University of Manitoba, skipped by Kaitlyn Lawes.

In 2007, she formed a women's team to compete on the World Curling Tour. In 2008 to 2010 she played third for Karen Bell before skipping her own rink once again. In 2011, she qualified for her first Ontario Scotties Tournament of Hearts, where she finished with a 3-6 record.
