= Lisa Farnell =

Canadian-English curler (born 1986)

- Curler
- Born: September 23, 1986 (age 40); Toronto, Ontario, Canada

Team
- Curling club: Fenton's Curling Rink, Royal Tunbridge Wells, England
- Skip: Lisa Farnell
- Third: Sydney Boyd
- Second: Kitty Conlin
- Lead: Naimh Fenton

Curling career
- Member Association: Ontario (2006-2015); England (2017-present)
- European Championship: 4 (2017, 2018, 2019, 2022)

Lisa Farnell (born September 23, 1986 in Toronto) is a Canadian-English curler originally from Peterborough, Ontario. She was the skip of the Ontario team at the 2006 Canadian Junior Curling Championships.

In 2006, Farnell and her team of Kim Brown, Darrelle Johnson and Amber Gebhardt won the provincial junior championships, earning the right to represent Ontario at the 2006 Canadian Junior Curling Championships in Thunder Bay, Ontario. At the Canadian Juniors, the team finished with a 5-6 record, tied for sixth place.

Farnell would later team up with 2005 provincial champion skip Erin Morrissey to form a competitive team on the women's World Curling Tour. The team made it to their first provincial women's championship in 2010, where they finished with a 5-4 record before losing in a tie-breaker match.

Farnell won her first World Curling Tour event at the 2013 Challenge Chateau Cartier de Gatineau. Her win involved defeating defending Canadian champion Rachel Homan in the semi-final and her third (Erin Morrissey)'s sister, Katie Morrissey in the final.

Farnell moved to London, England and will represent England at the 2017 European Curling Championships.
