= Northern Ontario Women's Curling Championship =

Canadian championship

- Established: 2008
- 2026 host city: North Bay
- 2026 arena: North Bay Granite Club
- 2026 champion: Krista Scharf

Current edition
- 2026 Northern Ontario Women's Curling Championship

The Northern Ontario Women's Curling Championship, formerly the Northern Ontario Scotties Tournament of Hearts is the provincial women's championships of curling in Northern Ontario, Canada. Beginning with the 2015 Scotties Tournament of Hearts, the winning team has a direct entry to the Scotties Tournament of Hearts, Canada's national women's curling championship.

In 2008, following the formation of the Northern Ontario Curling Association (NOCA), Northern Ontario held its first provincial women's curling championship, with the top four teams playing in the Ontario Scotties Tournament of Hearts. Prior to 2007, Northeastern Ontario and Northwestern Ontario each had their own qualifying tournaments for the Ontario championship. Northern Ontario was awarded a direct entry to the national championship beginning in 2015.

The tournament has only been won by two skips, Tracy Fleury and Krista McCarville.

== Winners ==
Year	Team	Winning club	Host	Runner-up skip (club)
2026	Krista Scharf, Ashley Sippala, Kendra Lilly, Sarah Potts	Fort William Curling Club	Thunder Bay	Robyn Despins (Fort William)
2025	Krista McCarville, Andrea Kelly, Ashley Sippala, Kendra Lilly, Sarah Potts	Fort William Curling Club	Thunder Bay	Emma Artichuk (Northern Credit Union)
2024	Krista McCarville, Andrea Kelly, Kendra Lilly, Ashley Sippala, Sarah Potts	Fort William Curling Club, Thunder Bay	Little Current	Krysta Burns (Northern Credit Union)
2023	Krista McCarville, Kendra Lilly, Ashley Sippala, Sarah Potts	Fort William Curling Club, Thunder Bay	Kenora	Krysta Burns (Sudbury)
2022	Cancelled due to the COVID-19 pandemic in Ontario. Team McCarville (Krista McCarville, Kendra Lilly, Ashley Sippala and Sarah Potts) represented Northern Ontario at Scotties.			
2021	Cancelled due to the COVID-19 pandemic in Ontario. Team Burns (Krysta Burns, Megan Smith, Sara Guy and Amanda Gates) represented Northern Ontario at Scotties. (Note: Team McCarville was appointed to be Northern Ontario's representative at the 2021 Scotties Tournament of Hearts, but declined and was replaced by Krysta Burns)			
2020	Krista McCarville, Kendra Lilly, Ashley Sippala, Jen Gates	Fort William Curling Club, Thunder Bay	New Liskeard	Krysta Burns (Idylwylde)
2019	Krista McCarville, Kendra Lilly, Jen Gates, Sarah Potts	Fort William Curling Club, Thunder Bay	Nipigon	Jenna Enge (Idylwylde/Port Arthur)
2018	Tracy Fleury, Crystal Webster, Amanda Gates, Jennifer Wylie, Jenna Enge	Idylwylde Golf & Country Club, Greater Sudbury	Sudbury	Krista McCarville (Fort William)
2017	Krista McCarville, Kendra Lilly, Ashley Sippala, Sarah Potts	Fort William Curling Club, Thunder Bay	Nipigon	Tracy Fleury (Idylwylde)
2016	Krista McCarville, Kendra Lilly, Ashley Sippala, Sarah Potts	Fort William Curling Club, Thunder Bay	Timmins	Tracy Fleury (Idylwylde)
2015	Tracy Horgan, Jennifer Horgan, Jenna Enge, Amanda Gates	Idylwylde Golf & Country Club, Greater Sudbury	Thunder Bay	Kendra Lilly (Fort William)
2014	Tracy Horgan, Jennifer Horgan, Jenna Enge, Amanda Gates	Idylwylde Golf & Country Club, Greater Sudbury	Sault Ste. Marie	Ashley Kallos (Fort William)
2013	Krista McCarville, Ashley Miharija, Kari Lavoie, Sarah Lang	Fort William Curling Club, Thunder Bay	Atikokan	Tracy Horgan (Idylwylde)
2012	Tracy Horgan, Jennifer Horgan, Jenna Enge, Amanda Gates	Idylwylde Golf & Country Club, Greater Sudbury	Copper Cliff	Krista McCarville (Fort William)
2011	Krista McCarville, Ashley Miharija, Kari MacLean, Sarah Lang	Fort William Curling Club, Thunder Bay	Nipigon	Ashley Kallos (Fort William)
2010	Tracy Horgan, Jennifer Horgan, Amanda Gates, Andrea Souliere-Poland	Idylwylde Golf & Country Club, Greater Sudbury	Cochrane	Marlo Dahl (Port Arthur)
2009	Krista McCarville, Tara George, Kari MacLean, Lorraine Lang	Fort William Curling Club, Thunder Bay	Thunder Bay	Tracy Horgan (Idylwylde)
2008	Tracy Horgan, Jennifer Horgan, Amanda Gates, Andrea Souliere-Poland	Idylwylde Golf & Country Club, Greater Sudbury	Espanola	Krista McCarville (Fort William)
2007 (Note: Listed as champions by the NOCA, but held before the formation of the organization. This team would win both the 2006 and 2007 Ontario Scott Tournament of Hearts.)	Krista Scharf, Tara George, Tiffany Stubbings, Lorraine Lang	Fort William Curling Club, Thunder Bay	—	—

== Number of titles ==
As of the 2026 Northern Ontario Women's Curling Championship

Curler	Titles
Krista Scharf	12
Ashley Sippala	9
Kendra Lilly	9
Sarah Potts	9
Tracy Fleury	6
Amanda Gates	6
Jennifer Wylie	6
Jenna Enge	4
Kari Lavoie	3
Andrea Kelly	2
Andrea Souliere-Poland	2
Jen Gates	2
Lorraine Lang	2
Tara George	2
Tiffany Stubbings	1
