= 2010 Ontario Scotties Tournament of Hearts =

- Host city: Thunder Bay, Ontario
- Arena: Port Arthur Curling Club
- Dates: January 4–10, 2010
- Winner: Team McCarville
- Curling club: Fort William CC, Thunder Bay
- Skip: Krista McCarville
- Third: Tara George
- Second: Ashley Miharija
- Lead: Kari MacLean
- Finalist: Tracy Horgan

The 2010 Ontario Scotties Tournament of Hearts wase the 2010 edition of the Ontario provincial women's curling championship. It was held January 4–10 at the Port Arthur Curling Club in Thunder Bay, Ontario. The winning Krista McCarville team represented Ontario at the 2010 Scotties Tournament of Hearts in Sault Ste. Marie, Ontario.

== Teams ==
Skip	Vice	Second	Lead	Club
Cathy Auld	Cheryl McPherson	Melissa Foster	Mary Chilvers	Mississaugua Golf & Country Club, Mississauga
Marlo Dahl	Shana Ketonen	Julie Ruoho	Carly Ray	Port Arthur Curling Club, Thunder Bay
Lisa Farnell	Erin Morrissey	Kim Brown	Ainsley Galbraith	Peterborough Curling Club, Peterborough
Jenn Hanna	Kelly Cochrane	Stephanie Hanna	Trish Scharf	Ottawa Curling Club, Ottawa
Jacqueline Harrison	Lori Eddy	Susan Froud	Julie Columbus	Alliston Curling Club, Alliston
Julie Hastings	Christy Trombley	Stacey Smith	Katrina Collins	Bayview Golf & Country Club, Thornhill, Ontario
Tracy Horgan	Jennifer Horgan	Amanda Gates	Andrea Souliere-Poland	Idylwylde Golf and Country Club, Sudbury
Carrie Lindner	Megan Balsdon	Leslie Bishop	Courtney Davies	Sarnia Golf and Curling Club, Sarnia
Krista Mayrand	Valerie MacInnes	Karen McGoldrick	Julie Brunet	Cochrane Curling Club, Cochrane
Krista McCarville	Tara George	Ashley Miharija	Kari MacLean	Fort William Curling Club, Thunder Bay

== Standings ==
Skip (Club)	W	L	PF	PA	Ends Won	Ends Lost	Blank Ends	Stolen Ends
Krista McCarville (Fort William)	9	0	66	43	39	31	11	13
Tracy Horgan (Idylwylde)	7	2	72	53	42	33	4	11
Cathy Auld (Mississaugua)	6	3	63	54	36	38	6	10
Jacqueline Harrison (Alliston)	5	4	50	48	30	36	12	3
Carrie Lindner (Sarnia)	5	4	67	55	39	33	11	11
Julie Hastings (Bayview)	4	5	62	55	39	37	5	10
Jenn Hanna (Ottawa)	4	5	53	54	37	38	12	10
Lisa Farnell (Peterborough)	2	7	61	77	35	36	8	5
Krista Mayrand (Cochrane)	2	7	44	67	33	37	6	11
Marlo Dahl (Port Arthur)	1	8	41	68	33	38	13	5

== Results ==
=== Draw 1 ===
January 4, 12:00 PM

Sheet 3	1	2	3	4	5	6	7	8	9	10	Final
Horgan 🔨	1	0	1	0	2	0	0	2	0	1	7
Hanna	0	1	0	2	0	1	0	0	2	0	6

Sheet 4	1	2	3	4	5	6	7	8	9	10	Final
Dahl	1	0	1	1	0	1	0	1	0	X	5
Auld 🔨	0	3	0	0	1	0	4	0	3	X	11

Sheet 5	1	2	3	4	5	6	7	8	9	10	Final
McCarville 🔨	0	0	1	1	1	0	3	0	1	X	7
Mayrand	0	2	0	0	0	1	0	1	0	X	4

Sheet 6	1	2	3	4	5	6	7	8	9	10	Final
Harrison	0	1	0	2	0	0	2	0	2	1	8
Hastings 🔨	1	0	2	0	1	0	0	1	0	0	5

Sheet 7	1	2	3	4	5	6	7	8	9	10	Final
Farnell	0	0	2	0	1	1	0	0	X	X	4
Linder 🔨	1	0	0	4	0	0	2	3	X	X	10

=== Draw 2 ===
January 4, 7:00 PM

Sheet 3	1	2	3	4	5	6	7	8	9	10	Final
Dahl	0	0	0	1	0	1	0	2	0	X	4
Farnell 🔨	0	3	0	0	2	0	1	0	1	X	7

Sheet 4	1	2	3	4	5	6	7	8	9	10	Final
Hanna 🔨	0	0	3	0	0	0	1	2	0	1	7
Mayrand	0	1	0	1	1	1	0	0	1	0	5

Sheet 5	1	2	3	4	5	6	7	8	9	10	Final
Horgan	0	2	2	0	0	1	0	1	0	1	7
Hastings 🔨	2	0	0	2	0	0	1	0	1	0	6

Sheet 6	1	2	3	4	5	6	7	8	9	10	Final
Auld 🔨	0	2	0	1	0	3	0	1	0	0	7
Lindner	0	0	2	0	1	0	1	0	1	1	6

Sheet 7	1	2	3	4	5	6	7	8	9	10	Final
McCarville	0	1	0	2	0	0	2	0	1	X	6
Harrison 🔨	0	0	1	0	2	0	0	1	0	X	4

=== Draw 3 ===
January 5, 12:00 PM

Sheet 3	1	2	3	4	5	6	7	8	9	10	Final
McCarville 🔨	1	1	0	0	0	1	0	2	1	1	7
Auld	0	0	1	1	2	0	2	0	0	0	6

Sheet 4	1	2	3	4	5	6	7	8	9	10	Final
Hastings 🔨	2	0	0	1	1	0	3	1	2	X	10
Lindner	0	2	1	0	0	2	0	0	0	X	5

Sheet 5	1	2	3	4	5	6	7	8	9	10	Final
Harrison	0	0	0	1	0	2	0	0	0	X	3
Hanna 🔨	1	0	1	0	1	0	1	2	1	X	7

Sheet 6	1	2	3	4	5	6	7	8	9	10	Final
Farnell 🔨	2	0	2	0	0	0	1	0	0	X	5
Mayrand	0	1	0	2	1	2	0	1	1	X	8

Sheet 7	1	2	3	4	5	6	7	8	9	10	Final
Dahl	0	1	0	3	0	1	0	0	X	X	5
Horgan 🔨	2	0	1	0	3	0	1	3	X	X	10

=== Draw 4 ===
January 5, 7:00 PM

Sheet 3	1	2	3	4	5	6	7	8	9	10	Final
Hanna	0	0	0	1	0	1	2	0	1	0	5
Hastings 🔨	0	1	1	0	2	0	0	1	0	2	7

Sheet 4	1	2	3	4	5	6	7	8	9	10	Final
McCarville 🔨	2	0	0	0	2	2	0	1	0	X	7
Dahl	0	0	2	0	0	0	1	0	1	X	4

Sheet 5	1	2	3	4	5	6	7	8	9	10	Final
Auld 🔨	1	0	0	0	1	1	0	2	0	X	5
Farnell	0	0	0	1	0	0	3	0	4	X	8

Sheet 6	1	2	3	4	5	6	7	8	9	10	Final
Horgan	0	1	1	0	0	1	0	1	2	0	6
Harrison 🔨	2	0	0	2	2	0	1	0	0	3	10

Sheet 7	1	2	3	4	5	6	7	8	9	10	Final
Lindner 🔨	0	2	2	0	1	0	3	2	X	X	10
Mayrand	2	0	0	0	0	1	0	0	X	X	3

=== Draw 5 ===
January 6, 12:00 PM

Sheet 3	1	2	3	4	5	6	7	8	9	10	Final
Mayrand	1	2	0	1	0	0	0	5	0	X	5
Horgan 🔨	0	0	1	0	1	1	2	0	2	X	7

Sheet 4	1	2	3	4	5	6	7	8	9	10	Final
Harrison	0	0	1	0	0	2	0	2	0	X	5
Farnell 🔨	0	0	0	0	1	0	2	0	1	X	4

Sheet 5	1	2	3	4	5	6	7	8	9	10	Final
Dahl	0	0	0	0	0	1	1	0	0	X	2
Lindner 🔨	0	0	1	0	2	0	0	1	1	X	5

Sheet 6	1	2	3	4	5	6	7	8	9	10	Final
Hanna	1	0	1	0	0	0	0	3	0	X	5
Auld 🔨	0	1	0	1	0	1	2	0	3	X	8

Sheet 7	1	2	3	4	5	6	7	8	9	10	Final
Hastings	0	0	0	1	1	0	1	0	1	X	4
McCarville 🔨	0	0	2	0	0	2	0	1	0	X	5

=== Draw 6 ===
January 6, 7:00 PM

Sheet 3	1	2	3	4	5	6	7	8	9	10	Final
Harrison 🔨	0	1	0	1	0	3	0	0	0	X	5
Lindner	0	0	1	0	3	0	2	2	2	X	10

Sheet 4	1	2	3	4	5	6	7	8	9	10	Final
Horgan 🔨	1	0	0	0	2	0	0	1	0	X	4
McCarville	0	1	1	2	0	0	2	0	1	X	7

Sheet 5	1	2	3	4	5	6	7	8	9	10	Final
Hastings 🔨	1	1	0	0	0	0	1	X	X	X	3
Auld	0	0	1	2	2	3	0	X	X	X	8

Sheet 6	1	2	3	4	5	6	7	8	9	10	Final
Mayrand	0	1	0	2	0	3	0	0	4	X	10
Dahl 🔨	1	0	1	0	2	0	0	1	0	X	5

Sheet 7	1	2	3	4	5	6	7	8	9	10	Final
Farnell	0	1	0	0	1	2	0	2	0	1	7
Hanna 🔨	2	0	1	1	0	0	2	0	2	0	8

=== Draw 7 ===
January 7, 2:00 PM

Sheet 3	1	2	3	4	5	6	7	8	9	10	11	Final
Hastings	0	2	0	2	1	0	0	1	0	1	0	7
Dahl 🔨	1	0	1	0	0	1	3	0	1	0	1	8

Sheet 4	1	2	3	4	5	6	7	8	9	10	11	Final
Lindner 🔨	1	0	0	0	1	0	0	2	0	2	1	7
Hanna	0	0	2	1	0	0	1	0	2	0	0	6

Sheet 5	1	2	3	4	5	6	7	8	9	10	Final
Mayrand	0	0	1	0	1	0	0	1	0	X	3
Harrison 🔨	0	2	0	2	0	0	1	0	1	X	6

Sheet 6	1	2	3	4	5	6	7	8	9	10	Final
McCarville	2	0	2	2	0	0	1	0	4	X	11
Farnell 🔨	0	1	0	0	2	1	0	1	0	X	5

Sheet 7	1	2	3	4	5	6	7	8	9	10	Final
Horgan 🔨	1	0	3	0	2	1	2	X	X	X	9
Auld	0	1	0	1	0	0	0	X	X	X	2

=== Draw 8 ===
January 7, 7:00 PM

Sheet 3	1	2	3	4	5	6	7	8	9	10	Final
Auld	0	0	3	2	2	0	2	0	X	X	9
Mayrand 🔨	1	1	0	0	0	1	0	2	X	X	5

Sheet 4	1	2	3	4	5	6	7	8	9	10	Final
Farnell	0	2	1	0	2	1	0	1	0	1	8
Hastings 🔨	3	0	0	2	0	0	2	0	2	0	9

Sheet 5	1	2	3	4	5	6	7	8	9	10	Final
Hanna 🔨	0	1	0	0	0	1	0	1	0	X	3
McCarville	0	0	2	0	2	0	1	0	3	X	8

Sheet 6	1	2	3	4	5	6	7	8	9	10	Final
Lindner 🔨	2	3	0	2	0	0	0	2	0	0	9
Horgan	0	0	2	0	3	2	0	0	2	1	10

Sheet 7	1	2	3	4	5	6	7	8	9	10	11	Final
Harrison	0	0	2	0	2	0	0	2	0	0	1	7
Dahl 🔨	2	0	0	1	0	0	1	0	1	1	0	6

=== Draw 9 ===
January 8, 11:00 AM

Sheet 3	1	2	3	4	5	6	7	8	9	10	Final
Lindner 🔨	0	0	1	0	0	2	1	0	1	X	5
McCarville	0	3	0	1	2	0	0	2	0	X	8

Sheet 4	1	2	3	4	5	6	7	8	9	10	11	Final
Auld	2	1	1	0	2	0	1	0	0	0	1	7
Harrison 🔨	0	0	0	1	0	2	0	0	0	2	0	6

Sheet 5	1	2	3	4	5	6	7	8	9	10	Final
Farnell 🔨	0	1	0	2	0	0	X	X	X	X	3
Horgan	4	0	2	0	4	2	X	X	X	X	12

Sheet 6	1	2	3	4	5	6	7	8	9	10	Final
Dahl	0	0	0	1	0	0	0	1	0	X	2
Hanna 🔨	0	0	1	0	1	0	2	0	2	X	6

Sheet 7	1	2	3	4	5	6	7	8	9	10	Final
Mayrand 🔨	0	0	1	0	0	X	X	X	X	X	1
Hastings	4	1	0	4	2	X	X	X	X	X	11

=== Tiebreaker ===
January 8, 7:00 PM

Sheet B	1	2	3	4	5	6	7	8	9	10	Final
Lindner	0	1	0	0	0	1	0	0	0	X	2
Harrison 🔨	0	0	2	0	0	0	1	4	1	X	8

== Playoffs ==
Page playoff system
1	Krista McCarville	6
2	Tracy Horgan	5
3	Cathy Auld	3
4	Jacqueline Harrison	8

Semifinal
2	Tracy Horgan	7
4	Jacqueline Harrison	3

Final
1	Krista McCarville	7
2	Tracy Horgan	4

=== 1 vs. 2 ===
January 9, 2:00 PM

Team	1	2	3	4	5	6	7	8	9	10	Final
McCarville 🔨	0	0	2	1	0	2	0	1	0	X	6
Horgan	0	1	0	0	1	0	1	0	2	X	5

=== 3 vs. 4 ===
January 9, 2:00 PM

Team	1	2	3	4	5	6	7	8	9	10	Final
Auld 🔨	1	0	0	1	0	1	0	0	0	X	3
Harrison	0	3	1	0	1	0	1	1	1	X	8

=== Semifinal ===
January 9, 7:00 PM

Team	1	2	3	4	5	6	7	8	9	10	Final
Horgan 🔨	0	2	0	1	0	1	2	1	0	X	7
Harrison	0	0	1	0	1	0	0	0	1	X	3

=== Final ===
January 10, 2:00 PM

Team	1	2	3	4	5	6	7	8	9	10	Final
McCarville 🔨	0	2	0	0	0	2	0	0	2	1	7
Horgan	0	0	1	1	1	0	1	0	0	0	4

== Southern Ontario Zones ==
Regional qualifiers in bold. Two teams qualify from each zone. When only one team enters a zone, then a team from the neighbouring zone also qualifies. Teams in italics opted to play in the challenge round after being eliminated.

=== Zone 1 ===
November 21–22 at the Rideau Curling Club

- **Jenn Hanna** (Ottawa)

=== Zone 2 ===
November 21–22 at the Rideau Curling Club

- Cheryl McBain (Rideau)
- **Ling-Yue Hung** (Rideau) [Zone 1 qualifier]
- **Laura Payne** (Rideau) [Zone 4 qualifier]
- **Katie Morissey** (Rideau)
- **Tracy Samaan** (Rideau)

=== Zone 3 ===
November 28–29 at the Carleton Place Curling Club

- **Jaimee Gardner** (Arnprior) [Zone 4 qualifier]
- **Nancy Wickham** (Carleton Place)
- **Jennifer Harvey** (Renfrew)
- Kelly McKenna (Richmond)

=== Zone 4 ===
December 4–6 at the Land O'Lakes Curling Club (Tweed). No teams entered

=== Zone 5 ===
November 27–29 at the Haliburton Curling Club

- **Denna Bagshaw** (Cannington)
- Kim Lewis (Haliburton)
- Julie Cully (Lindsay)
- **Lisa Farnell** (Peterborough)
- Angie Melaney (Lakefield)
- Marteen Lortie (Peterborough)

=== Zone 6 ===
December 4–6, Annandale Country Club (Ajax)

- **Lianne Robertson** (Tam Heather)
- **Christine Pierce** (Unionville)

=== Zone 7 ===
November 28–29, East York Curling Club

- **Christine Anderson** (Leaside)
- **Julie Hastings** (Bayview)
- Alison Goring (Bayview)
- Colleen Madonia (Thornhill)

=== Zone 8 ===
November 28-December 2, Mississaugua Golf & Country Club

- Megan Hugel (Dixie)
- **Kathy Brown** (High Park)
- Jodi McCutcheon (High Park)
- **Cathy Auld** (Mississaugua)

=== Zone 9 ===
December 4–6, Acton Curling Club

- **Jacqueline Harrison** (Alliston)
- **Kristy Russell** (Orangeville)

=== Zone 10 ===
November 28–29, Elmvale Curling Club

- Tracey Sitts (Parry Sound)
- **Jennifer Allan** (Barrie) [Zone 11 qualifier]
- Lynne Middaugh (Orillia)
- **Sherry Middaugh** (Coldwater)
- **Heather Marshall** (Stroud)

=== Zone 11 ===
December 4–6, Tara Curling Club

- **Lisa McLean** (Paisley)

=== Zone 12 ===
December 4–6, Arthur & Area Curling Club

- **Tracey Jones** (Arthur)
- Sheri Smeltzer (Fergus)
- **Jenn Spencer** (Guelph)
- Grace Coyle (Kitchener-Waterloo Granite)

=== Zone 13 ===
December 5–6, Glendale Golf & Country Club (Hamilton)

- Kersti Belshaw (Burlington)
- **Christine Rettie** (Dundas Granite)
- **Val Stephens-Brockbank** (Dundas Granite)
- **Brit O'Neill** (Glendale) [Zone 14 qualifier]

=== Zone 14 ===
December 4–6, Walkerton Golf & Country Club

- **Karen Bell** (Listowel)

=== Zone 15 ===
December 4–6, Tavistock Curling Club

- **Tina Mazerolle** (Brant)
- **Jo-Ann Rizzo** (Brant)

=== Zone 16 ===
December 4–6, Glencoe & District Curling Club

- **Fiona Muirhead** (Ilderton)
- Kimberley Tuck (Ilderton)
- **Carrie Lindner** (Sarnia)
- Tiffany Anjema (Sarnia)
- Amie Shackleton (Ilderton)

=== Regions 1 & 2 ===
December 11–13, Royal Kingston Curling Club

A Side
1A	**Jenn Hanna**
3B	Nancy Wickham
2A	**Tracy Samaan**
4B	Jaimee Gardner
3A	Jennifer Harvey
1B	**Ling-Yue Hung**
4A	**Laura Payne**
2B	Katie Morissey
5A	**Denna Bagshaw**
7B	Julie Hastings
6A	Christine Pierce
8B	**Kathy Brown**
7A	Christine Anderson
5B	**Lisa Farnell**
8A	**Cathy Auld**
6B	Lianne Robertson

Quarter-finals
**Jenn Hanna**
Tracy Samaan
Ling-Yue Hung
**Laura Payne**
**Denna Bagshaw**
Kathy Brown
**Lisa Farnell**
Cathy Auld

Semi-finals
**Jenn Hanna**
Laura Payne
Denna Bagshaw
**Lisa Farnell**

Final
**Jenn Hanna**
Lisa Farnell

B Side (Top half)
Nancy Wickham
**Jaimee Gardner**
Jennifer Harvey
**Katie Morissey**

Semifinals
**Cathy Auld**
Jaimee Gardner
**Katie Morissey**
Kathy Brown

Finals
**Cathy Auld**
Katie Morissey

B Side (Bottom half)
**Julie Hastings**
Christine Pierce
**Christine Anderson**
Leanna Robertson

Semifinals
Ling-Yue Hung
**Julie Hastings**
Christine Anderson
**Tracy Samaan**

Finals
**Julie Hastings**
Tracy Samaan

B Side	Semifinal	**Final**
		**Lisa Farnell**
Laura Payne		Cathy Auld
**Cathy Auld**	**Cathy Auld**
**Denna Bagshaw**	Denna Bagshaw
Julie Hastings

=== Regions 3&4 ===
December 11–13, Kitchener-Waterloo Granite Club

A Side
9A	**Kristy Russell**
11B	Jennifer Allan
10A	**Sherry Middagh**
12B	Jen Spencer
11A	Lisa McLean
9B	**Jacqueline Harrison**
12A	Tracey Jones
10B	**Heather Marshall**
13A	Christine Rettie
15B	**Jo-Ann Rizzo**
14A	Karen Bell
16B	**Carrie Lindner**
15A	**Tina Mazerolle**
13B	Valerie Stephens-Brockbank
16A	Fiona Muirhead
14B	**Brit O'Neill**

Quarter-finals
**Kristy Russell**
Sherry Middaugh
**Jacqueline Harrison**
Heather Marshall
Jo-Ann Rizzo
**Carrie Lindner**
Tina Mazerolle
**Brit O'Neill**

Semi-finals
Kristy Russell
**Jacqueline Harrison**
**Carrie Lindner**
Brit O'Neill

Final
Jacqueline Harrison
**Carrie Lindner**

B Side (Top half)
Jennifer Allan
**Jen Spencer**
**Lisa McLean**
Tracey Jones

Semifinals
Tina Mazerolle
**Jen Spencer**
**Lisa McLean**
Jo-Ann Rizzo

Finals
Jen Spencer
**Lisa McLean**

B Side (Bottom half)
Christine Rettie
**Karen Bell**
Valerie Stephens-Brockbank
**Fiona Muirhead**

Semifinals
Heather Marshall
**Karen Bell**
Fiona Muirhead
**Sherry Middaugh**

Finals
Karen Bell
**Sherry Middaugh**

B Side	Semifinal	**Final**
		**Jacqueline Harrison**
**Kristy Russell**		Sherry Middaugh
Lisa McLean	Kristy Russell
Brit O'Neill	**Sherry Middaugh**
**Sherry Middaugh**

=== Challenge Round ===
December 18–20, Milton Curling Club

A Side
**Kathy Brown**
Brit O'Neill
**Karen Bell**
Angie Melaney
**Jo-Ann Rizzo**
Sheri Smeltzer
Denna Bagshaw
**Heather Marshall**
**Kristy Russell**
Alison Goring

Quarterfinals
**Sherry Middaugh**
Kathy Brown
Karen Bell
**Jo-Ann Rizzo**
**Cathy Auld**
Heather Marshall
Kristy Russell
**Julie Hastings**

Semifinals
**Sherry Middaugh**
Jo-Ann Rizzo
Cathy Auld
**Julie Hastings**

Finals
Sherry Middaugh
**Julie Hastings**

B Side (Top half)
**Angie Melaney**
Sheri Smeltzer

Quarterfinals
Kristy Russell
**Brit O'Neill**
**Angie Melaney**
Heather Marshall

Semifinals
**Brit O'Neill**
Angie Melaney

Finals
Jo-Ann Rizzo
**Brit O'Neill**

B Side (Bottom half)	Semifinals	Finals
		**Cathy Auld**
Karen Bell		Kathy Brown
**Denna Bagshaw**	Denna Bagshaw
Alison Goring	**Kathy Brown**
**Kathy Brown**

B Semi final	B Final
Brit O'Neill
**Cathy Auld**	Sherry Middaugh
	**Cathy Auld**

== Northern Ontario ==
The entire region of Northern Ontario had a play down in one event held December 3–6 at the Cochrane Curling Club in Cochrane. The top 4 teams qualified for the Ontario Scotties.

Teams:

- Marlo Dahl (Port Arthur)
- Krista McCarville (Fort William) [Automatically qualified]
- Angela Lee (Port Arthur)
- Krista Mayrand (Cochrane)
- Oye-Sem Won (Fort William)
- Lisa Rouillard (Sudbury)
- Dawn Schwar (Sudbury)
- Rhonda Skillen (Port Arthur)
- MacKenzie Daley (North Bay Granite)
- Tracy Horgan (Idylwylde)

A Side
Rouillard	9
Daley	8

Quarterfinals
Horgan	13
Rouillard	7
Won	10
Schwar	2
Dahl	4
Skillen	6
Mayrand	8
Lee	3

Semifinals
Horgan	9
Won	5
Skillen	7
Mayrand	6

Finals
Horgan	9
Skillen	6

B-side play in: Lee 9-5 Daley

B Side
Dahl	10
Lee	3
Schwar	8
Rouillard	7

Quarterfinals
Dahl	7
Won	2
Schwar	10
Mayrand	3

Semifinals
Dahl	10
Schwar	3

Finals
Dahl	7
Skillen	5

C side Qualifier

B Side
Daley	4
Rouillard	10

Quarterfinals
Lee	7
Mayrand	10
Rouillard	6
Won	8

Semifinals
Mayrand	9
Schwar	8
Won	6
Skillen	9

Finals
Mayrand	9
Skillen	6

Final: Horgan 7-3 Dahl
