= Cathy Auld =

Canadian curler (born 1971)

- Curler
- Born: December 3, 1971 (age 54); Kingston, Ontario

Team
- Curling club: Listowel Curling Club, Listowel, ON
- Skip: Cathy Auld
- Third: Erin Morrissey
- Second: Erica Hopson
- Lead: Kim Brown

Curling career
- Member Association: Ontario
- Top CTRS ranking: 15th (2009–10, 2012–13)

Catherine "Cathy" Auld (born December 3, 1971) is a Canadian curler from Toronto.

== Career ==
Auld was a longtime member of the Alison Goring rink. Auld played third for the team until 2006 when she was promoted to last rock thrower when Goring moved to throwing lead rocks. The team found success together with this lineup modification. At the 2007 Ontario Scotties Tournament of Hearts, they finished the round robin with a 7-2 record. This was enough to secure a playoff spot and they faced Sherry Middaugh in the 3-4 game. However, they lost the game. The team qualified for the 2008 Ontario Scotties Tournament of Hearts, where they completed the round robin with a 6-3 record. They made it to the playoffs, winning the 3-4 game over Janet McGhee and took on Middaugh in the semifinal, again suffering a loss. The team's success was capped at the 2009 Ontario Scotties Tournament of Hearts, where they finished the round robin with a 5-4 record. The team won two tiebreakers to advance to the playoffs, where for the third consecutive year they met Middaugh. This time they captured the 3-4 game, advancing to the semi-final, where they faced and defeated Julie Hastings. The final was against Thunder Bay's Krista McCarville, where the team came up short, losing the championship.

At the end of the 2008/2009 curling season, Auld left the Goring team to form a new squad, taking longtime teammate Cheryl McPherson along with her. They found immediate success qualifying for the 2010 Ontario Scotties Tournament of Hearts, where they would finish round robin with a 6-3 record. For the fourth consecutive year, Auld would make the playoffs, but once again lost the 3-4 game, this time to Jacqueline Harrison. After the 2009/2010 season, McPherson left the team, and returned to play with Alison Goring, a move that Auld would not recover from. Her new squad failed to qualify for the 2011 Ontario Scotties Tournament of Hearts.

With a new line up going into the 2011/12 curling season, Auld found success on the curling tour, and once again qualifying for the 2012 Ontario Scotties Tournament of Hearts, defeating two former Ontario Champions, Rachel Homan and Jenn Hanna in the regional playdowns to qualify for the provincials. Auld's team started well at the event, winning five out of six games, but lost three straight, one loss too many to qualify playoffs. A critical steal in the eleventh end by Sherry Middaugh in Draw 8, and a steal by Krista McCarville in the tenth end of Draw 10 that closed the door on the playoffs on Auld.

As of 2018, Auld has played in 13 provincial championships. In 1995 she played for Pam Leavitt. In 1997 she played for Kristin Turcotte. She did not return to the provincial Tournament of Hearts until 2007 when she joined the Goring rink.

== Personal life ==
Auld has also been the CFO of several publicly traded biotechnology companies in Canada. She currently owns Catherine Auld Consulting, in Toronto.

== Grand Slam record ==
Key
C	Champion
F	Lost in Final
SF	Lost in Semifinal
QF	Lost in Quarterfinals
R16	Lost in the round of 16
Q	Did not advance to playoffs
T2	Played in Tier 2 event
DNP	Did not participate in event
N/A	Not a Grand Slam event that season

Event	2012–13	2013–14	2014–15
Autumn Gold	QF	Q	Q
Colonial Square	Q	DNP	
Masters	Q	DNP	
Canadian Open	N/A	N/A	
Players'	DNP	DNP	

=== Former events ===
Event	2007–08	2008–09	2009–10	2010–11	2011–12	2012–13	2013–14
Manitoba Lotteries	DNP	DNP	DNP	DNP	DNP	Q	DNP
Sobeys Slam	QF	Q	N/A	DNP	N/A	N/A	N/A
