= 2024 Northern Ontario Scotties Tournament of Hearts =

Curling championship in Little Current

- Host city: Little Current, Ontario
- Arena: NEMI Recreation Complex
- Dates: January 25–28
- Winner: Team McCarville
- Curling club: Fort William CC, Thunder Bay
- Skip: Krista McCarville
- Third: Andrea Kelly
- Second: Ashley Sippala
- Lead: Kendra Lilly
- Alternate: Sarah Potts
- Coach: Rick Lang
- Finalist: Krysta Burns

The 2024 Northern Ontario Scotties Tournament of Hearts, the Northern Ontario women's curling championship, was held from January 25 to 28 at the NEMI Recreation Complex in Little Current, Ontario. The event was held in conjunction with the 2024 Northern Ontario Men's Provincial Curling Championship, the provincial men's championship.

The winning rink Krista McCarville rink represented Northern Ontario at the 2024 Scotties Tournament of Hearts, Canada's national women's curling championship in Calgary, Alberta where they finished in a five-way tie for third in Pool A with a 4–4 record along with British Columbia's Corryn Brown, Manitoba's Kaitlyn Lawes, Quebec, and Saskatchewan. With tiebreaker games now abolished and the first tiebreaker (which was head-to-head between all tied teams) was tied as well at 2–2, cumulative last stone draw distance between all the teams was used to decide who would make the playoffs. The McCarville rink finished with a total of 370.3 but would miss the playoffs as the Lawes rink (who they lost to in the final game of round robin play) finished first with a 231.6.

== Teams ==
The teams are listed as follows:

Skip	Third	Second	Lead	Alternate	Coach	Club
Krysta Burns	Jestyn Murphy	Sara Guy	Laura Masters		Rodney Guy	Northern Credit Union CC, Sudbury
Abby Deschene	Stephanie Barbeau	Laura Forget	Candice Jackson	Lauren Mann	Louise Hickey	McIntyre CC, Schumacher
Robyn Despins	Nicole Westlund-Stewart	Samantha Morris	Rebecca Carr	Corie Adamson	Paul Carr	Fort William CC, Thunder Bay
Laura Johnston	Mackenzie Daley	Joanne Forget	Jen Leudke	Darla Esch		North Bay GC, North Bay
Krista McCarville	Andrea Kelly	Ashley Sippala	Kendra Lilly	Sarah Potts	Rick Lang	Fort William CC, Thunder Bay
Jackie McCormick	Crystal Taylor	Jen Gates	Amanda Gates			Idylwylde G & CC, Sudbury

=== Map of teams ===
Northern Ontario Women's Curling Championship Teams

== Round robin standings ==
Final Round Robin Standings

Key
Teams to Final

Skip	W	L	PF	PA	EW	EL	BE	SE
Krista McCarville	5	0	42	16	24	11	3	11
Krysta Burns	4	1	34	23	24	19	3	7
Robyn Despins	3	2	39	23	24	18	1	12
Laura Johnston	2	3	33	44	17	22	2	5
Abby Deschene	1	4	33	44	18	26	2	3
Jackie McCormick	0	5	20	47	13	24	2	2

== Round robin results ==
All draws are listed in Eastern Time (UTC−05:00).

=== Draw 1 ===
Thursday, January 25, 8:00 pm

Sheet B	1	2	3	4	5	6	7	8	9	10	Final
Laura Johnston 🔨	2	0	0	2	2	0	2	0	4	X	12
Jackie McCormick	0	1	0	0	0	2	0	3	0	X	6

Sheet C	1	2	3	4	5	6	7	8	9	10	11	Final
Krysta Burns 🔨	1	1	0	2	0	3	0	0	1	0	3	11
Abby Deschene	0	0	1	0	1	0	4	1	0	1	0	8

Sheet D	1	2	3	4	5	6	7	8	9	10	Final
Robyn Despins	0	0	1	0	0	2	0	2	0	X	5
Krista McCarville 🔨	0	2	0	2	1	0	2	0	3	X	10

=== Draw 2 ===
Friday, January 26, 2:30 pm

Sheet B	1	2	3	4	5	6	7	8	9	10	Final
Krista McCarville	0	1	0	1	1	0	0	2	0	2	7
Krysta Burns 🔨	0	0	1	0	0	2	1	0	2	0	6

Sheet C	1	2	3	4	5	6	7	8	9	10	Final
Robyn Despins 🔨	1	0	0	2	1	0	2	2	1	X	9
Jackie McCormick	0	0	1	0	0	3	0	0	0	X	4

Sheet E	1	2	3	4	5	6	7	8	9	10	Final
Laura Johnston	0	3	0	0	4	0	2	0	1	1	11
Abby Deschene 🔨	1	0	3	1	0	5	0	0	0	0	10

=== Draw 3 ===
Friday, January 26, 7:30 pm

Sheet A	1	2	3	4	5	6	7	8	9	10	Final
Krysta Burns 🔨	1	1	0	0	1	1	0	0	0	2	6
Robyn Despins	0	0	1	0	0	0	2	1	1	0	5

Sheet C	1	2	3	4	5	6	7	8	9	10	Final
Krista McCarville 🔨	0	5	0	2	1	2	X	X	X	X	10
Laura Johnston	0	0	2	0	0	0	X	X	X	X	2

Sheet D	1	2	3	4	5	6	7	8	9	10	Final
Jackie McCormick 🔨	1	0	2	0	0	1	1	1	0	X	6
Abby Deschene	0	1	0	4	3	0	0	0	1	X	9

=== Draw 4 ===
Saturday, January 27, 2:30 pm

Sheet C	1	2	3	4	5	6	7	8	9	10	Final
Abby Deschene	0	0	0	0	1	0	1	X	X	X	2
Krista McCarville 🔨	1	2	1	3	0	2	0	X	X	X	9

Sheet D	1	2	3	4	5	6	7	8	9	10	Final
Robyn Despins	2	0	2	0	0	2	1	1	1	X	9
Laura Johnston 🔨	0	1	0	1	1	0	0	0	0	X	3

Sheet E	1	2	3	4	5	6	7	8	9	10	Final
Jackie McCormick	0	2	0	1	0	0	X	X	X	X	3
Krysta Burns 🔨	2	0	3	0	4	2	X	X	X	X	11

=== Draw 5 ===
Saturday, January 27, 7:30 pm

Sheet A	1	2	3	4	5	6	7	8	9	10	Final
Jackie McCormick	0	0	0	0	0	1	0	X	X	X	1
Krista McCarville 🔨	0	1	1	1	1	0	2	X	X	X	6

Sheet B	1	2	3	4	5	6	7	8	9	10	Final
Abby Deschene 🔨	0	0	0	2	0	1	0	0	1	X	4
Robyn Despins	3	0	1	0	1	0	1	1	0	X	7

Sheet C	1	2	3	4	5	6	7	8	9	10	Final
Laura Johnston	0	0	0	2	2	0	0	1	0	X	5
Krysta Burns 🔨	0	4	1	0	0	2	1	0	1	X	9

== Final ==
Sunday, January 28, 9:00 am

Sheet C	1	2	3	4	5	6	7	8	9	10	Final
Krista McCarville 🔨	1	0	1	0	2	0	1	1	0	X	6
Krysta Burns	0	1	0	1	0	1	0	0	1	X	4

2024 Northern Ontario Scotties Tournament of Hearts

Krista McCarville
10th Northern Ontario Provincial Championship title
