= 2007 Ontario Scotties Tournament of Hearts =

- Host city: Mississauga, Ontario
- Arena: Dixie Curling Club
- Dates: January 22–28, 2007
- Winner: Team Scharf
- Curling club: Fort William CC, Thunder Bay
- Skip: Krista Scharf
- Third: Tara George
- Second: Tiffany Stubbings
- Lead: Lorraine Lang
- Finalist: Sherry Middaugh

The 2007 Ontario Scotties Tournament of Hearts was held January 22-28 at the Dixie Curling Club in Mississauga, Ontario. Krista Scharf's rink from Thunder Bay, Ontario won their second straight provincial title.

== Teams ==
Skip	Third	Second	Lead	Curling Club
Karen Bell	Suzanne Boudreault	Christine Loube	Heather Zucker	Brant Curling Club, Brantford
Michele Boland	Angela Lee	Ashley Kallos	Andrea Lee	Fort William Curling Club, Thunder Bay
Arynn Frantz	Melanie Patry	Nicole Dubuc	Natalie Beauchamp	Coniston Curling Club, Coniston
Alison Goring	Cathy Auld	Heather Moffett	Melissa Foster	Bayview Golf and Country Club, Thornhill
Jenn Hanna	Chrissy Cadorin	Stephanie Hanna	Joelle Sabourin	Ottawa Curling Club, Ottawa
Sara Harvey	Stacey Smith	Tammy Sale	Katrina Collins	Unionville Curling Club, Unionville
Maggie Mazzuca	Meri Bolander	Karen Cecutti	Anette Lauzon-McDonald	Copper Cliff Curling Club, Copper Cliff
Sherry Middaugh	Kim Moore	Kate Hamer	Andra Harmark	Coldwater and District Curling Club, Coldwater
Jo-Ann Rizzo	Julie Reddick	Leigh Armstrong	Stephanie Leachman	Brant Curling Club, Brantford
Krista Scharf	Tara George	Tiffany Stubbings	Lorraine Lang	Fort William Curling Club, Thunder Bay

== Standings ==
Skip	W	L
Jenn Hanna (Ottawa)	8	1
Krista Scharf(Fort William)	7	2
Alison Goring (Bayview)	7	2
Sherry Middaugh (Coldwater)	5	4
Karen Bell (Brant)	4	5
Sara Harvey (Unionville)	4	5
Jo-Ann Rizzo (Brant)	4	5
Maggie Mazzuca (Copper Cliff)	3	6
Michelle Boland(Fort William)	3	6
Arynn Frantz (Coniston)	0	9

Page playoff system
1	Jenn Hanna	5
2	Krista Scharf	11
3	Sherry Middaugh	10
4	Alison Goring	4

Semifinal
1	Jenn Hanna	7
3	Sherry Middaugh	8

Final
2	Krista Scharf	7
3	Sherry Middaugh	5
