= 2006 Ontario Scott Tournament of Hearts =

- Host city: Fort Frances, Ontario
- Arena: Fort Frances Curling Club
- Dates: January 30–February 4, 2006
- Winner: Team Scharf
- Curling club: Fort William CC, Thunder Bay
- Skip: Krista Scharf
- Third: Tara George
- Second: Tiffany Stubbings
- Lead: Lorraine Lang
- Finalist: Janet McGhee

The 2006 Ontario Scott Tournament of Hearts was held January 30-February 4 at the Fort Frances Curling Club in Fort Frances, Ontario. Krista Scharf's rink from Thunder Bay, Ontario won her first provincial title.

== Teams ==
Skip	Third	Second	Lead	Curling Club
Natalie Beauchamp	Melanie Patry	Nicole Dubuc	Arynn Bailey	Coniston Curling Club, Coniston
Marilyn Bodogh	Michelle Gray	Kelly MacIntosh	Danielle Garner	St. Catharines Curling Club, St. Catharines
Kathy Brown	Janet Langevin	Christine Loube	Heather Carr Olmstead	Sutton Curling Club, Sutton West
Chrissy Cadorin	Leigh Armstrong	Stephanie Leachman	Breanne Merklinger	Guelph Curling Club, Guelph
Marlo Dahl	Wendy Landry	Karen Furioso	Cathy Ross	Fort William Curling Club, Thunder Bay
Jenn Hanna	Joelle Sabourin	Dawn Askin	Stephanie Hanna	Ottawa Curling Club, Ottawa
Janet McGhee	Julie Reddick	Lee Merklinger	Lori Eddy	Uxbridge and District Curling Club, Uxbridge
Jo-Ann Rizzo	Cheryl McPherson	Kimberly Tuck	Sarah Jane Gatchell	Brant Curling Club, Brantford
Krista Scharf	Tara George	Tiffany Stubbings	Lorraine Lang	Fort William Curling Club, Thunder Bay
Nancy Wickam	Meri Bolander	Janice Vettoretti	Christine McGarry	Sudbury Curling Club, Sudbury, Ontario

== Standings ==
Skip	W	L
Krista Scharf (Fort William)	7	2
Janet McGhee(Uxbridge)	7	2
Marilyn Bodogh (St. Catharines)	6	3
Jenn Hanna (Ottawa)	6	3
Jo-Ann Rizzo (Brant)	5	4
Chrissy Cadorin (Guelph)	5	4
Kathy Brown (Sutton)	4	5
Nancy Wickham (Surbury)	3	6
Natalie Beauchamp (Coniston)	2	7
Marlo Dahl (Fort William)	0	9

Page playoff system
1	Krista Scharf	5
2	Janet McGhee	4
3	Marilyn Bodogh	9
4	Jenn Hanna	8

Semifinal
2	Janet McGhee	8
3	Marilyn Bodogh	5

Final
1	Krista Scharf	7
2	Janet McGhee	6
