= 2009 Ontario Scotties Tournament of Hearts =

- Host city: Oakville, Ontario
- Arena: Oakville Curling Club
- Dates: January 26–February 1, 2009
- Winner: Team McCarville
- Curling club: Fort William CC, Thunder Bay
- Skip: Krista McCarville
- Third: Tara George
- Second: Kari MacLean
- Lead: Lorraine Lang
- Finalist: Alison Goring

The 2009 Ontario Scotties Tournament of Hearts was the 2009 edition of the provincial women's curling tournament in the province of Ontario, Canada. It was held January 26-February 1 at the Oakville Curling Club in Oakville. The winning team represented Ontario at the 2009 Scotties Tournament of Hearts in Victoria, British Columbia, where it finished tied for sixth.

== Teams ==
Skip	Vice	Second	Lead	Club
Chrissy Cadorin	Colleen Madonia	Janet Murphy	Kate Hamer	Mississaugua Golf & Country Club, Mississauga
Cathy Auld	Cheryl McPherson	Jennifer Issler	Alison Goring*	Bayview Country Club, Thornhill
Jenn Hanna	Stephanie Hanna	Lee Merklinger	Lisa Weagle	Ottawa Curling Club, Ottawa
Julie Hastings	Christy Trombley	Stacey Smith	Katrina Collins	Bayview Country Club, Thornhill
Tracy Horgan	Jennifer Horgan	Amanda Gates	Andrea Soulier-Poland	Idylwylde Golf and Country Club, Sudbury
Krista McCarville	Tara George	Kari MacLean	Lorraine Lang	Fort William Curling Club, Thunder Bay
Sherry Middaugh	Kirsten Wall	Kim Moore	Andra Harmark	Coldwater and District Curling Club, Coldwater
Ashley Miharija	Angela Lee	Alissa Begin	Tracy Auld	Port Arthur Curling Club, Thunder Bay
Julie Reddick	Jo-Ann Rizzo	Leigh Armstrong	Stephanie Leachman	Brant Curling Club, Brantford
Dawn Schwar	Sandra Henderson	Janice Vettoretti	Jann Costante	Sudbury Curling Club, Sudbury

* Skip (calls the game) but throws lead rocks.

== Standings ==
Skip (Club)	W	L	PF	PA	Ends Won	Ends Lost	Blank Ends
Krista McCarville (Fort William)	6	3	68	36	40	30	14
Julie Hastings (Bayview)	6	3	55	54	37	36	11
Sherry Middaugh (Coldwater)	6	3	64	54	43	41	4
Alison Goring (Bayview)	5	4	61	51	45	34	8
Jenn Hanna (Ottawa)	5	4	57	51	38	36	8
Julie Reddick (Brant)	5	4	57	48	39	33	13
Ashley Miharija (Port Arthur)	4	5	41	48	33	35	14
Tracy Horgan (Idylwylde)	4	5	58	60	36	41	4
Chrissy Cadorin (Mississaugua)	3	6	41	60	30	38	14
Dawn Schwar (Sudbury)	1	8	36	68	27	41	6

== Results ==
=== Draw 1 ===
January 26, 1400

Sheet 2	1	2	3	4	5	6	7	8	9	10	Final
Julie Hastings	0	1	0	1	0	0	0	1	0	X	3
Krista McCarville	0	0	1	0	1	2	0	0	1	X	5

Sheet 3	1	2	3	4	5	6	7	8	9	10	Final
Julie Reddick	0	0	0	0	1	0	1	0	2	X	4
Jenn Hanna 🔨	1	0	0	1	0	3	0	1	0	X	6

Sheet 4	1	2	3	4	5	6	7	8	9	10	11	Final
Tracy Horgan 🔨	0	0	1	0	1	0	2	0	3	0	2	9
Alison Goring	1	0	0	2	0	1	0	2	0	1	0	7

Sheet 5	1	2	3	4	5	6	7	8	9	10	Final
Ashley Miharija	0	0	1	0	0	1	0	1	X	X	3
Sherry Middaugh	0	1	0	3	2	0	1	0	X	X	7

Sheet 6	1	2	3	4	5	6	7	8	9	10	Final
Dawn Schwar 🔨	0	0	2	1	2	0	0	1	0	0	6
Chrissy Cadorin	2	1	0	0	0	2	0	0	0	2	7

=== Draw 2 ===
January 26, 1915

Sheet 2	1	2	3	4	5	6	7	8	9	10	Final
Julie Reddick 🔨	3	1	3	0	1	1	X	X	X	X	9
Dawn Schwar	0	0	0	1	0	0	X	X	X	X	1

Sheet 3	1	2	3	4	5	6	7	8	9	10	Final
Krista McCarville 🔨	0	1	0	0	1	0	2	0	3	1	8
Alison Goring	0	0	1	1	0	1	0	1	0	0	4

Sheet 4	1	2	3	4	5	6	7	8	9	10	Final
Julie Hastings	0	2	0	1	1	0	1	0	1	1	7
Sherry Middaugh 🔨	2	0	2	0	0	1	0	1	0	0	6

Sheet 5	1	2	3	4	5	6	7	8	9	10	Final
Jenn Hanna	0	1	0	0	0	2	0	2	1	X	6
Chrissy Cadorin 🔨	0	0	1	0	0	0	1	0	0	X	2

Sheet 6	1	2	3	4	5	6	7	8	9	10	Final
Tracy Horgan	0	1	1	0	1	0	0	1	0	X	4
Ashley Miharija	1	0	0	1	0	2	0	0	2	X	6

=== Draw 3 ===
January 27, 1400

Sheet 2	1	2	3	4	5	6	7	8	9	10	Final
Tracy Horgan 🔨	0	2	0	0	1	0	2	0	X	X	5
Jenn Hanna	3	0	2	1	0	2	0	3	X	X	11

Sheet 3	1	2	3	4	5	6	7	8	9	10	Final
Sherry Middaugh	0	2	0	2	0	1	0	0	1	0	6
Chrissy Cadorin 🔨	0	0	1	0	2	0	1	1	0	2	7

Sheet 4	1	2	3	4	5	6	7	8	9	10	Final
Ashley Miharija	0	0	0	0	0	1	1	0	0	X	2
Krista McCarville 🔨	0	0	2	1	1	0	0	1	1	X	6

Sheet 5	1	2	3	4	5	6	7	8	9	10	Final
Dawn Schwar	0	0	2	0	0	0	2	0	0	2	6
Alison Goring 🔨	0	2	0	1	1	1	0	1	1	0	7

Sheet 6	1	2	3	4	5	6	7	8	9	10	Final
Julie Reddick	0	2	0	2	1	0	2	0	2	1	10
Julie Hastings 🔨	2	0	3	0	0	1	0	1	0	0	7

=== Draw 4 ===
January 27, 1900

Sheet 2	1	2	3	4	5	6	7	8	9	10	Final
Krista McCarville 🔨	2	0	1	0	0	0	1	1	0	0	5
Sherry Middaugh	0	1	0	3	1	1	0	0	1	2	9

Sheet 3	1	2	3	4	5	6	7	8	9	10	11	Final
Tracy Horgan 🔨	1	0	1	0	0	1	0	2	1	0	3	9
Julie Reddick	0	2	0	1	1	0	1	0	0	1	0	6

Sheet 4	1	2	3	4	5	6	7	8	9	10	Final
Jenn Hanna 🔨	2	0	4	2	1	0	X	X	X	X	9
Dawn Schwar	0	1	0	0	0	1	X	X	X	X	2

Sheet 5	1	2	3	4	5	6	7	8	9	10	Final
Julie Hastings	0	0	0	0	2	0	0	2	0	1	5
Ashley Miharija 🔨	0	0	1	1	0	1	0	0	1	0	4

Sheet 6	1	2	3	4	5	6	7	8	9	10	Final
Chrissy Cadorin 🔨	0	0	0	0	0	0	2	0	X	X	2
Alison Goring	0	1	1	1	1	1	0	3	X	X	8

=== Draw 5 ===
January 28, 1400

Sheet 2	1	2	3	4	5	6	7	8	9	10	Final
Alison Goring 🔨	0	1	0	1	3	3	X	X	X	X	8
Julie Hastings	0	0	0	0	0	0	X	X	X	X	0

Sheet 3	1	2	3	4	5	6	7	8	9	10	Final
Ashley Miharija	0	1	1	0	4	0	0	1	0	X	7
Dawn Schwar	1	0	0	1	0	1	1	0	1	X	5

Sheet 4	1	2	3	4	5	6	7	8	9	10	Final
Julie Reddick 🔨	0	1	0	2	0	0	0	0	2	1	6
Chrissy Cadorin	1	0	1	0	0	0	1	1	0	0	4

Sheet 5	1	2	3	4	5	6	7	8	9	10	Final
Krista McCarville 🔨	0	1	0	0	3	1	0	1	0	X	6
Jenn Hanna	0	0	1	0	0	0	1	0	1	X	3

Sheet 6	1	2	3	4	5	6	7	8	9	10	Final
Sherry Middaugh	1	2	0	1	1	0	0	1	0	1	7
Tracy Horgan 🔨	0	0	1	0	0	2	0	0	2	0	5

=== Draw 6 ===
January 28, 1900

Sheet 2	1	2	3	4	5	6	7	8	9	10	Final
Ashley Miharija 🔨	0	1	0	1	0	0	2	0	1	1	6
Chrissy Cadorin	1	0	0	0	1	0	0	2	0	0	4

Sheet 3	1	2	3	4	5	6	7	8	9	10	11	Final
Julie Hastings	0	1	0	1	0	2	0	1	0	3	1	9
Tracy Horgan 🔨	2	0	1	0	3	0	1	0	1	0	0	8

Sheet 4	1	2	3	4	5	6	7	8	9	10	11	Final
Sherry Middaugh 🔨	0	2	1	0	0	2	1	0	1	0	1	8
Jenn Hanna	1	0	0	2	1	0	0	2	0	1	0	7

Sheet 5	1	2	3	4	5	6	7	8	9	10	11	Final
Alison Goring	0	0	0	1	0	1	0	3	1	0	1	7
Julie Reddick 🔨	1	2	1	0	0	0	1	0	0	1	0	6

Sheet 6	1	2	3	4	5	6	7	8	9	10	Final
Dawn Schwar	0	0	1	0	0	X	X	X	X	X	1
Krista McCarville 🔨	3	2	0	2	2	X	X	X	X	X	9

=== Draw 7 ===
January 29, 1400

Sheet 2	1	2	3	4	5	6	7	8	9	10	Final
Sherry Middaugh 🔨	0	2	0	0	1	0	0	2	2	X	7
Julie Reddick	1	0	1	0	0	1	1	0	0	X	4

Sheet 3	1	2	3	4	5	6	7	8	9	10	Final
Chrissy Cadorin	0	0	0	1	0	1	1	1	0	2	6
Krista McCarville 🔨	0	1	2	0	0	0	0	0	2	0	5

Sheet 4	1	2	3	4	5	6	7	8	9	10	Final
Alison Goring 🔨	0	0	1	0	1	0	0	2	1	2	7
Ashley Miharija	1	1	0	1	0	1	0	0	0	0	4

Sheet 5	1	2	3	4	5	6	7	8	9	10	Final
Tracy Horgan 🔨	1	0	1	1	0	2	1	0	2	X	8
Dawn Schwar	0	1	0	0	1	0	0	1	0	X	3

Sheet 6	1	2	3	4	5	6	7	8	9	10	Final
Julie Hastings 🔨	2	0	0	0	1	0	2	1	1	3	10
Jenn Hanna	0	1	1	2	0	1	0	0	0	0	5

=== Draw 8 ===
January 29, 1900

Sheet 2	1	2	3	4	5	6	7	8	9	10	11	Final
Jenn Hanna 🔨	2	0	1	0	1	0	2	0	0	1	1	8
Alison Goring	0	1	0	2	0	2	0	1	1	0	0	7

Sheet 3	1	2	3	4	5	6	7	8	9	10	Final
Dawn Schwar 🔨	1	0	2	0	2	0	1	0	2	2	10
Sherry Middaugh	0	2	0	2	0	1	0	1	0	0	6

Sheet 4	1	2	3	4	5	6	7	8	9	10	Final
Krista McCarville 🔨	0	2	2	0	4	2	X	X	X	X	10
Tracy Horgan	0	0	0	1	0	0	X	X	X	X	1

Sheet 5	1	2	3	4	5	6	7	8	9	10	Final
Chrissy Cadorin	1	0	0	2	0	0	3	0	0	X	6
Julie Hastings	0	0	1	0	2	1	0	2	2	X	8

Sheet 6	1	2	3	4	5	6	7	8	9	10	Final
Ashley Miharija	0	0	0	0	1	0	0	1	X	X	2
Julie Reddick	0	2	0	2	0	2	0	0	X	X	6

=== Draw 9 ===
January 30, 1400

Sheet 2	1	2	3	4	5	6	7	8	9	10	Final
Chrissy Cadorin	1	1	0	0	1	0	X	X	X	X	3
Tracy Horgan 🔨	0	0	2	3	0	4	X	X	X	X	9

Sheet 3	1	2	3	4	5	6	7	8	9	10	Final
Jenn Hanna	1	0	0	2	0	0	1	0	0	X	4
Ashley Miharija	0	0	1	0	1	3	0	1	1	X	7

Sheet 4	1	2	3	4	5	6	7	8	9	10	Final
Dawn Schwar 🔨	0	0	0	0	0	1	0	0	1	X	2
Julie Hastings	0	0	1	0	1	0	3	1	0	X	6

Sheet 5	1	2	3	4	5	6	7	8	9	10	11	Final
Julie Reddick 🔨	3	0	1	0	0	0	0	0	0	1	1	6
Krista McCarville	0	3	0	0	0	1	0	1	0	0	0	5

Sheet 6	1	2	3	4	5	6	7	8	9	10	Final
Alison Goring 🔨	1	0	1	0	1	0	1	0	2	0	6
Sherry Middaugh	0	1	0	2	0	1	0	3	0	1	8

=== Tie breakers ===
January 30, 1900

Sheet 3	1	2	3	4	5	6	7	8	9	10	Final
Julie Reddick	0	1	0	1	0	1	0	1	0	X	4
Alison Goring 🔨	1	0	1	0	1	0	2	0	1	X	6

January 31, 0900

Sheet 3	1	2	3	4	5	6	7	8	9	10	11	Final
Jenn Hanna 🔨	0	2	0	2	0	0	1	0	2	0	0	7
Alison Goring	1	0	2	0	1	1	0	1	0	1	2	9

== Playoffs ==
Page playoff system
1	Krista McCarville	8
2	Julie Hastings	5
3	Sherry Middaugh	6
4	Alison Goring	7

Semifinal
2	Julie Hastings	3
4	Alison Goring	7

Final
1	Krista McCarville	5
4	Alison Goring	3

=== 3 vs. 4 ===
January 31, 1400

Sheet 4	1	2	3	4	5	6	7	8	9	10	11	Final
Alison Goring	0	0	1	0	2	2	0	0	1	0	1	7
Sherry Middaugh 🔨	1	0	0	2	0	0	1	1	0	1	0	6

=== 1 vs. 2 ===
January 31, 1400

Sheet 3	1	2	3	4	5	6	7	8	9	10	Final
Krista McCarville 🔨	2	0	2	1	0	2	0	1	0	X	8
Julie Hastings	0	1	0	0	1	0	2	0	1	X	5

=== Semi-final ===
January 31, 1900

Sheet 3	1	2	3	4	5	6	7	8	9	10	Final
Alison Goring	0	1	1	0	3	0	0	1	1	X	7
Julie Hastings 🔨	0	0	0	1	0	1	1	0	0	X	3

=== Final ===
February 1, 1400

Sheet 3	1	2	3	4	5	6	7	8	9	10	Final
Krista McCarville 🔨	0	0	0	1	0	0	1	1	0	2	5
Alison Goring	0	0	0	0	1	0	0	0	2	0	3

== Qualification ==
The tournament will consist of ten teams. Since there is no Northern Ontario team at the Scotties, the provincial tournament must consist of the entire province of Ontario. The provincial finals will consist of four teams from Northern Ontario and six from Southern Ontario. The four Northern Ontario teams qualify from one playdown, while the six Southern Ontario teams qualify from a series of zone and regional playdowns. Two teams qualify from each of the two Southern Ontario regions, while two teams come from a provincial "last chance" qualification tournament. The two regions consist of eight zones where two teams from which qualify for the regional tournaments.

== Southern Ontario Zones ==
Teams in bold advanced to regionals. Teams underlined opted to play in the challenge round.

=== Zone 1 ===
December 7, Navan Curling Club (Navan)

Teams:

- **Jenn Hanna** (Ottawa)
- **Raja Wysocki** (Winchester)
- Barb Kelly (Russell)

=== Zone 2 ===
December 20-21, Rideau Curling Club (Ottawa)

Teams:

- Cheryl McBain (Rideau)
- Katrina Carr (Rideau)
- **Allison Farrell** (Rideau)
- Carole Fujimoto (Rideau)
- **Jacqueline Harrison** (Rideau)

=== Zone 3 ===
December 20-21, Carleton Place Curling Club (Carleton Place)

Teams:

- **Susan Schmidt** (Granite of West Ottawa)
- **Tracy Samaan** (Pakenham)
- Debra Karbashewski (Carleton Place)

=== Zone 4 ===
Originally scheduled for December 19-21, Royal Kingston Curling Club (Kingston)

Teams:

- **Allie Wood** (Cataraqui)
- **Rhonda Varnes** (Rideau) (Transferred from Zone 2 to fill vacancy)

=== Zone 5 ===
December 6, Bobcaygeon Curling Club (Bobcaygeon)

Teams:

- Cathy Stakie (Bobcaygeon)
- Denna Bagshaw (Cannington)
- **Angie Melaney** (Lakefield)
- **Lisa Farnell** (Peterborough)

=== Zone 6 ===
December 6-7, Annandale Country Club (Ajax)

Teams:

- Lianne Robertson (Tam Heather)
- **Janet McGhee** (Uxbridge)
- Sara Harvey (Whitby)
- **Christine Pierce** (Unionville)

=== Zone 7 ===
December 20-21, Richmond Hill Curling Club (Richmond Hill)

Teams:

- Chris Anderson (Leaside)
- **Julie Hastings** (Bayview)
- **Alison Goring** (Bayview)
- JoAnn Inouye (York)
- Karri-Lee Grant (Thornhill)

=== Zone 8 ===
December 20-21, Mississaugua Golf & Country Club (Mississauga)

Teams:

- **Ann Pearson** (Oakville)
- Kelly Cochrane (High Park)
- **Chrissy Cadorin** (Mississaugua)

=== Zone 9 ===
December 6, Markdale Golf & Curling Club (Markdale)

Teams:

- **Susan Froud** (Alliston)
- **Kristy Russell** (Orangeville)

=== Zone 10 ===
December 20, Penetanguishene Curling Club (Penetanguishene)

Teams:

- **Carrie Lindner** (Bradford)
- **Sherry Middaugh** (Coldwater)
- Heather Marshall (Stroud)

=== Zone 11 ===
Originally scheduled December 5-7, Southampton Curling Club (Southampton)

Teams:

- **Suzanne Boudreault** (Port Elgin)
- **Anne Dunn** (Galt Country) [brought in from Zone 12]

=== Zone 12 ===
December 6-7, Westmount Golf & Country Club (Kitchener)

Teams:

- Anne Dunn (Galt Country) [See Zone 11]
- **Kathy Brown** (Guelph)
- **Dawn Sherk** (Guelph)
- Kathy Ryan (Kitchener-Waterloo Granite)
- Taylor Mellor (Kitchener-Waterloo Granite)

=== Zone 13 ===
December 20-21, Burlington Golf & Country Club (Burlington)

Teams:

- Christine Rettie (Dundas Granite)
- Stacey Brandwood (Glendale)
- **Margie Hewitt** (St. Catharines Golf)
- **Brit O'Neill** (St. Catharines Golf)

=== Zone 14 ===
December 6, Teeswater Curling Club (Teeswater)

Teams:

- Joyce Millen (Teeswater)
- **Karen Bell** (Listowel)
- Amy Mackay (Listowel)
- **Kaylene Rundle** (Exeter)

=== Zone 15 ===
Originally scheduled December 19-21, Stratford Country Club (Stratford)

Teams:

- **Tara Maxwell** (Brant)
- **Julie Reddick** (Brant)

=== Zone 16 ===
December 5-7, Forest Curling & Social Club (Forest)

Teams:

- Amie Shackleton (Ilderton)
- **Kimberley Tuck** (Ilderton)
- Harmony Simmons (Sarnia)
- **Bridget Arnold** (Sarnia)
- Ruth Alexander (Highland)

== Southern Ontario Regions ==
All on January 9-11 weekend

=== Region 1&2 (Zones 1-8) ===
Land O'Lakes Curling Club, Marmora

A Side
5A	Angie Melaney (Lakefield)
6B	Janet McGhee (Uxbridge)
7A	Julie Hastings (Bayview)
8B	Ann Pearson (Oakville)
6A	Christine Pierce (Unionville)
5B	Lisa Farnell (Peterborough)
8A	Chrissy Cadorin (Mississaugua)
7B	Alison Goring (Bayview)
1A	Jenn Hanna (Ottawa)
2B	Allison Farrell (Rideau)
3A	Tracy Samaan (Pakenham)
4B	Rhonda Varnes (Rideau)
2A	Jacqueline Harrison (Rideau)
1B	Raja Wysocki (Winchester)
4A	Allie Wood (Cataraqui)
3B	Susan Schmidt (Granite)

Quarter-finals
Janet McGhee
Julie Hastings
Lisa Farnell
Alison Goring
Jenn Hanna
Tracy Samaan
Jacqueline Harrison
Susan Schmidt

Semi-finals
Julie Hastings
Alison Goring
Jenn Hanna
Jacqueline Harrison

Final
Julie Hastings
Jacqueline Harrison

B Side (Top half)
Angie Melaney
Ann Pearson
Christine Pierce
Chrissy Cadorin

Semifinals
Susan Schmidt
Angie Melaney
Christine Pierce
Tracy Samaan

Finals
Susan Schmidt
Christine Pierce

B Side (Bottom half)
Allison Farrell
Rhonda Varnes
Raja Wysocki
Allie Wood

Semifinals
Lisa Farnell
Allison Farrell
Allie Wood
Janet McGhee

Finals
Lisa Farnell
Janet McGhee

B Side	Semifinal	Final
		Jacqueline Harrison
Alison Goring		Alison Goring
Susan Schmidt	Alison Goring
Jenn Hanna	Lisa Farnell
Lisa Farnell

=== Region 3&4 (Zones 9-16) ===
Norwich District Curling Club, Norwich

A Side
13A	Brit O'Neill (St. Catharines Golf)
14B	Kaylene Rundle (Exeter)
15A	Julie Reddick (Bayview)
16B	Bridget Arnold (Sarnia)
14A	Karen Bell (Listowel)
13B	Margie Hewitt (St. Catharines Golf)
16A	Kimberly Tuck (Ilderton)
15B	Tara Maxwell (Brant)
9A	Kristy Russell (Orangeville)
10B	Carrie Lindner (Bradford)
11A	Suzanne Boudreault (Port Elgin)
12B	Kathy Brown (Guelph)
10A	Sherry Middaugh (Coldwater)
9B	Susan Froud (Alliston)
12A	Dawn Sherk (Guelph)
3B	Anne Dunn (Galt Country)

Quarter-finals
Brit O'Neill
Julie Reddick
Margie Hewitt
Kimberley Tuck
Carrie Lindner
Kathy Brown
Sherry Middaugh
Anne Dunn

Semi-finals
Brit O'Neill
Margie Hewitt
Carrie Lindner
Sherry Middaugh

Final
Margie Hewitt
Sherry Middaugh

B Side (Top half)
Kaylene Rundle
Bridget Arnold
Karen Bell
Tara Maxwell

Semifinals
Anne Dunn
Kaylene Rundle
Karen Bell
Kathy Brown

Finals
Anne Dunn
Kathy Brown

B Side (Bottom half)
Kristy Russell
Suzanne Boudreault
Susan Froud
Dawn Sherk

Semifinals
Kimberley Tuck
Suzanne Boudreault
Susan Froud
Julie Reddick

Finals
Kimberley Tuck
Julie Reddick

B Side	Semifinal	Final
		Margie Hewitt
Brit O'Neill		Julie Reddick
Kathy Brown	Brit O'Neill
Carrie Lindner	Julie Reddick
Julie Reddick

== Southern Ontario Challenge Round ==
The challenge round will be held January 16-19 at the Bradford & District Curling Club in Bradford to determine the last two spots.

== Northern Ontario Region ==
The Northern Ontario playdown was held January 7-11 at the Port Arthur Curling Club in Thunder Bay.

Teams:

- Tracy Horgan (Idylwylde)
- Dawn Schwar (Sudbury)
- Lisa Foulds (Fort William)
- Christine Eby-Jean (Fort William)
- Krista McCarville (Fort William)
- Krista Mayrand (Cochrane)
- Kelly McLellan (Soo Curlers)
- Crystal Wojtowicz (Kenora)
- Ashley Miharija (Port Arthur)

A Side
Foulds	9
Wojtowicz	2

Quarterfinals
Horgan	9
Foulds	8
Schwar
Eby-Jean
McLellan
Miharija
McCarville	10
Mayrand	3

Semifinals
Horgan	8
Eby-Jean	5
Miharija	4
McCarville	5

Finals
Horgan	6
McCarville	9

B-side play in: Mayrand def. Wojtowich

B Side
McLellan	9
Mayrand	4
Foulds	7
Schwar	8

Quarterfinals
McLellan	10
Eby-Jean	8
Schwar	5
Miharija	8

Semifinals
McLellan	1
Miharija	6

Finals
Miharija	7
Horgan	6

C side Qualifier #1

Semifinal		Final
		Schwar	9
Mayrand	9	McLellan	4
Schwar	2

C side qualifier 2

Quarterfinals		Semifinals		Finals
Wojtowich	7
Foulds	4	Wojtowich	5
		Eby-Jean	10
				Eby-Jean	2
				Horgan	9

Page playoff system
A1	McCarville	10
B1	Miharija	6
C1	Schwar	3
C2	Horgan	9

Semifinal
Miharija	4
Horgan	7

Final
McCarville	9
Horgan	6
