= 2023 Northern Ontario Scotties Tournament of Hearts =

Curling championship in Kenora, Ontario

- Host city: Kenora, Ontario
- Arena: Kenora Recreation Centre
- Dates: January 25–29
- Winner: Team McCarville
- Curling club: Fort William CC, Thunder Bay
- Skip: Krista McCarville
- Third: Kendra Lilly
- Second: Ashley Sippala
- Lead: Sarah Potts
- Coach: Rick Lang
- Finalist: Krysta Burns

The 2023 Northern Ontario Scotties Tournament of Hearts, the Northern Ontario women's curling championship, was held from January 25 to 29 at the Kenora Recreation Centre in Kenora, Ontario. The event was held in conjunction with the 2023 Northern Ontario Men's Provincial Curling Championship, the provincial men's championship.

The winning Krista McCarville rink represented Northern Ontario at the 2023 Scotties Tournament of Hearts, Canada's national women's curling championship in Kamloops, British Columbia where they won Pool B with a 7–1 record and finished third losing to eventual champion Team Canada 7–5 in the semifinal.

This was the first time this event was held since 2020 due to the COVID-19 pandemic in Ontario. The 2022 event, which was also planned to be held in Kenora had been cancelled.

== Teams ==
The teams are listed as follows:

Skip	Third	Second	Lead	Club
Hailey Beaudry	Erin Tomalty	Victoria Beaudry	Hilary Smith	Fort Frances CC, Fort Frances
Jennifer Briscoe	Shana Marchessault	Corie Adamson	Carly Perras	Port Arthur CC, Thunder Bay
Krysta Burns	Katie Ford	Sara Guy	Laura Masters	Northern Credit Union CC, Sudbury
Bella Croisier	Celeste Gauthier	Dominique Vivier	Piper Croisier	Northern Credit Union CC, Sudbury
Krista McCarville	Kendra Lilly	Ashley Sippala	Sarah Potts	Fort William CC, Thunder Bay
Jackie McCormick	Crystal Taylor	Jen Gates	Amanda Gates	Stratton CC, Stratton
Nicole Westlund-Stewart	Megan Carr	Samantha Morris	Rebecca Carr	Port Arthur CC, Thunder Bay

== Round-robin standings ==
Final round-robin standings

Key
Teams to Playoffs
Teams to Tiebreaker

Skip	W	L	PF	PA	EW	EL	BE	SE
Krista McCarville	5	1	59	16	27	11	3	13
Jackie McCormick	5	1	38	32	24	18	1	9
Krysta Burns	4	2	50	35	26	24	0	10
Bella Croisier	4	2	43	45	25	25	2	6
Nicole Westlund-Stewart	2	4	33	37	23	23	4	9
Jennifer Briscoe	1	5	28	46	20	27	7	5
Hailey Beaudry	0	6	14	54	10	28	6	3

== Round-robin results ==
All draws are listed in Central Time (UTC−06:00).

=== Draw 1 ===
Wednesday, January 25, 9:30 am

Sheet C	1	2	3	4	5	6	7	8	9	10	Final
Bella Croisier 🔨	0	2	0	0	1	0	2	0	0	X	5
Jackie McCormick	1	0	2	2	0	1	0	2	2	X	10

=== Draw 2 ===
Wednesday, January 25, 2:30 pm

Sheet A	1	2	3	4	5	6	7	8	9	10	Final
Krysta Burns	1	0	1	3	0	0	2	0	0	0	7
Nicole Westlund-Stewart 🔨	0	1	0	0	1	1	0	1	1	1	6

Sheet E	1	2	3	4	5	6	7	8	9	10	Final
Hailey Beaudry	0	0	0	0	0	X	X	X	X	X	0
Krista McCarville 🔨	2	4	1	1	4	X	X	X	X	X	12

=== Draw 3 ===
Wednesday, January 25, 7:30 pm

Sheet B	1	2	3	4	5	6	7	8	9	10	Final
Krista McCarville 🔨	0	3	0	3	2	1	X	X	X	X	9
Nicole Westlund-Stewart	1	0	1	0	0	0	X	X	X	X	2

Sheet C	1	2	3	4	5	6	7	8	9	10	Final
Hailey Beaudry	0	0	0	2	0	0	X	X	X	X	2
Krysta Burns 🔨	1	3	3	0	1	4	X	X	X	X	12

Sheet E	1	2	3	4	5	6	7	8	9	10	Final
Jennifer Briscoe	0	1	1	0	1	0	1	0	X	X	4
Bella Croisier 🔨	1	0	0	3	0	2	0	4	X	X	10

=== Draw 4 ===
Thursday, January 26, 9:30 am

Sheet A	1	2	3	4	5	6	7	8	9	10	Final
Jennifer Briscoe	0	0	0	0	0	0	X	X	X	X	0
Krista McCarville 🔨	0	1	1	3	3	2	X	X	X	X	10

Sheet D	1	2	3	4	5	6	7	8	9	10	11	Final
Krysta Burns	0	0	0	2	1	1	0	0	2	2	0	8
Jackie McCormick 🔨	1	1	3	0	0	0	2	1	0	0	1	9

=== Draw 5 ===
Thursday, January 26, 2:30 pm

Sheet B	1	2	3	4	5	6	7	8	9	10	Final
Hailey Beaudry	0	0	1	0	2	0	0	0	X	X	3
Bella Croisier 🔨	1	1	0	1	0	1	1	3	X	X	8

=== Draw 6 ===
Thursday, January 26, 7:30 pm

Sheet B	1	2	3	4	5	6	7	8	9	10	Final
Jennifer Briscoe	0	1	0	1	0	0	3	0	2	0	7
Krysta Burns 🔨	2	0	2	0	2	1	0	1	0	1	9

Sheet D	1	2	3	4	5	6	7	8	9	10	11	Final
Bella Croisier	0	0	1	1	0	0	0	2	3	0	1	8
Nicole Westlund-Stewart 🔨	1	0	0	0	1	1	1	0	0	3	0	7

Sheet E	1	2	3	4	5	6	7	8	9	10	Final
Krista McCarville 🔨	1	0	1	4	0	4	X	X	X	X	10
Jackie McCormick	0	1	0	0	1	0	X	X	X	X	2

=== Draw 8 ===
Friday, January 27, 2:30 pm

Sheet B	1	2	3	4	5	6	7	8	9	10	Final
Jackie McCormick	1	0	0	2	0	1	0	0	0	1	5
Nicole Westlund-Stewart 🔨	0	0	1	0	0	0	0	2	0	0	3

Sheet C	1	2	3	4	5	6	7	8	9	10	Final
Bella Croisier	0	0	1	0	1	3	0	3	0	2	10
Krista McCarville 🔨	0	2	0	4	0	0	2	0	1	0	9

Sheet D	1	2	3	4	5	6	7	8	9	10	Final
Hailey Beaudry 🔨	1	0	1	1	0	2	0	0	0	0	5
Jennifer Briscoe	0	0	0	0	2	0	1	2	1	1	7

=== Draw 9 ===
Friday, January 27, 7:30 pm

Sheet A	1	2	3	4	5	6	7	8	9	10	Final
Jennifer Briscoe 🔨	0	0	1	0	1	0	0	0	3	0	5
Jackie McCormick	0	0	0	1	0	3	0	0	0	2	6

Sheet C	1	2	3	4	5	6	7	8	9	10	Final
Hailey Beaudry	0	0	2	0	1	0	X	X	X	X	3
Nicole Westlund-Stewart 🔨	2	4	0	0	0	3	X	X	X	X	9

Sheet D	1	2	3	4	5	6	7	8	9	10	Final
Krysta Burns	0	0	0	1	0	0	1	0	X	X	2
Krista McCarville 🔨	0	2	2	0	1	1	0	3	X	X	9

=== Draw 10 ===
Saturday, January 28, 9:30 am

Sheet A	1	2	3	4	5	6	7	8	9	10	Final
Krysta Burns	0	3	2	0	3	0	4	X	X	X	12
Bella Croisier 🔨	0	0	0	1	0	1	0	X	X	X	2

Sheet D	1	2	3	4	5	6	7	8	9	10	Final
Hailey Beaudry 🔨	0	0	0	0	0	0	0	1	0	X	1
Jackie McCormick	0	0	0	0	1	0	2	0	3	X	6

Sheet E	1	2	3	4	5	6	7	8	9	10	11	Final
Jennifer Briscoe 🔨	0	0	1	0	1	2	0	0	0	1	0	5
Nicole Westlund-Stewart	2	0	0	1	0	0	1	0	1	0	1	6

== Playoffs ==
Page playoff system
1	Krista McCarville	7
2	Jackie McCormick	4
3	Krysta Burns	12
4	Bella Croisier	7

Semifinal
2	Jackie McCormick	6
3	Krysta Burns	12

Final
1	Krista McCarville	9
3	Krysta Burns	4

=== 1 vs. 2 ===
Saturday, January 28, 7:30 pm

Sheet B	1	2	3	4	5	6	7	8	9	10	Final
Krista McCarville 🔨	0	0	2	0	1	1	1	0	2	X	7
Jackie McCormick	0	0	0	2	0	0	0	2	0	X	4

=== 3 vs. 4 ===
Saturday, January 28, 7:30 pm

Sheet A	1	2	3	4	5	6	7	8	9	10	Final
Krysta Burns 🔨	0	3	0	0	3	0	3	0	3	X	12
Bella Croisier	1	0	1	0	0	3	0	2	0	X	7

=== Semifinal ===
Sunday, January 29, 9:30 am

Sheet D	1	2	3	4	5	6	7	8	9	10	Final
Jackie McCormick 🔨	0	2	1	0	2	0	0	1	0	0	6
Krysta Burns	1	0	0	3	0	2	1	0	2	3	12

=== Final ===
Sunday, January 29, 2:00 pm

Sheet C	1	2	3	4	5	6	7	8	9	10	Final
Krista McCarville 🔨	0	2	0	2	1	0	0	3	1	X	9
Krysta Burns	0	0	1	0	0	3	0	0	0	X	4

2023 Northern Ontario Scotties Tournament of Hearts

Krista McCarville
9th Northern Ontario Provincial Championship title
