= 2008 Ontario Scotties Tournament of Hearts =

- Host city: Espanola, Ontario
- Arena: Espanola Curling Club
- Dates: January 21–27, 2008
- Winner: Team Middaugh
- Curling club: Coldwater and District CC, Severn
- Skip: Sherry Middaugh
- Third: Kirsten Wall
- Second: Kim Moore
- Lead: Andra Harmark
- Finalist: Krista McCarville

The 2008 Ontario Scotties Tournament of Hearts was held January 21–27 at the Espanola Curling Club in Espanola, Ontario. Sherry Middaugh's rink from Coldwater, Ontario won their fourth provincial title.

== Teams ==
Skip	Third	Second	Lead	Curling Club
Meri Bolander	Maggie Mazzuca	Karen Cecutti	Annette Lauzon-McDonald	Copper Cliff Curling Club, Copper Cliff
Alison Goring	Cathy Auld	Leslie Bishop	Melissa Foster	Bayview Curling Club, Thornhill
Jenn Hanna	Chrissy Cadorin	Stephanie Hanna	Lee Merklinger	Ottawa Curling Club, Ottawa
Tracy Horgan	Jennifer Horgan	Amanda Gates	Andrea Souliere-Poland	Idylwylde Golf and Country Club, Sudbury
Colleen Madonia	Karri-Lee Grant	Janet Murphy	Julie Ann Columbus	Mississaugua Golf & Country Club, Mississauga
Krista McCarville	Tara George	Kari MacLean	Lorraine Lang	Fort William Curling Club, Thunder Bay
Janet McGhee	Sara Harvey	Susan Froud	Candace Coe	Uxbridge and District Curling Club, Uxbridge
Sherry Middaugh	Kirsten Wall	Kim Moore	Andra Harmark	Coldwater and District Curling Club, Coldwater
Julie Reddick	Jo-Ann Rizzo	Leigh Armstrong	Stephanie Leachman	Brant Curling Club, Brantford
Amy Stachiw	Alissa Begin	Lisa Foulds	Larissa Stevens	Fort William Curling Club, Thunder Bay

== Standings ==
Team	Win	L
Middaugh (Coldwater)	8	1
McCarville (Fort William)	6	3
Goring (Bayview)	6	3
McGhee (Uxbridge)	6	3
Hanna (Ottawa)	6	3
Reddick (Brant)	5	4
Madonia (Mississaugua)	3	6
Horgan (Idylwylde)	3	6
Stachiw (Fort William)	2	7
Bolander (Copper Cliff)	0	9

== Playoffs ==
- Tie breaker: McGhee 9-3 Hanna

Page playoff system
1	Sherry Middaugh	5
2	Krista McCarville	6
3	Alison Goring	7
4	Janet McGhee	3

Semifinal
1	Sherry Middaugh	7
3	Alison Goring	2

Final
2	Krista McCarville	6
1	Sherry Middaugh	7

== Qualification ==
=== Southern Ontario Zone winners ===
Regional winners in bold. Challenge round qualifiers in bold and italics.

Zone	Winner	Club
1A	**Jenn Hanna**	Ottawa
1B	Lauren Mann	Ottawa
2A	Joyce Potter	Rideau
2B	Tracy Samaan	Rideau
3A	Barb Kelly	Carleton Place
3B	Deb Karbashewski	Carleton Place
4A	Alison Levere	Cataraqui
4B	Lisa Farnell	Cataraqui
5A	Denna Schell	Cannington
5B	Lisa Kannakko	Peterborough
6A	Kathy Brown	Sutton
6B	**Janet McGhee**	Uxbridge
7A	Julie Hastings	Bayview
7B	**Alison Goring**	Bayview
8A	**Colleen Madonia**	Mississaugua
8B	Delaine Payton	Scarboro
9A	Kristy Russell	Orangeville
9B	Karen Rae	Brampton
10A	**Sherry Middaugh**	Coldwater
10B	Susan Morby	Barrie
11A	Suzanne Boudreault	Port Elgin
11B	Sheri Greenman	Meaford
12A	Dawn Sherk	Guelph
12B	Jen Issler	Guelph
13A	Stacey Brandwood	Glendale
13B	B. J. Strengel	Dundas Granite
14A	Marika Bakewell	Palmerston
14B	Becky Philpott	Listowel
15A	**Julie Reddick**	Brant
15B	Kelly MacIntosh	Brant
16A	Melanie Urquhart	Chatham Granite
16B	Amie Coward	Ilderton

=== Northern Ontario championship ===
15 women's teams entered the Northern Ontario championship (the first ever, after the formation of the Northern Ontario Curling Association in 2007). The event was also held in Espanola, and ran from January 3 to 6. Tracy Horgan defeated Krista McCarville 7–6 to win the event. Amy Stachiew and Mari Bolander also qualified for the Ontario Scotties.
