= 2016 Northern Ontario Scotties Tournament of Hearts =

Tournament

- Host city: Timmins, Ontario
- Arena: McIntyre Curling Club
- Dates: January 20–24
- Winner: Team McCarville
- Curling club: Fort William CC, Thunder Bay
- Skip: Krista McCarville
- Third: Kendra Lilly
- Second: Ashley Sippala
- Lead: Sarah Potts
- Alternate: Oye-Sem Won Briand
- Finalist: Tracy Fleury

The 2016 Northern Ontario Scotties Tournament of Hearts was held January 20–24 at the McIntyre Curling Club in Timmins. The winning Krista McCarville rink represented Northern Ontario at the 2016 Scotties Tournament of Hearts in Grande Prairie, Alberta.

== Teams ==
| Skip | Third | Second | Lead | Alternate | Club |
|---|---|---|---|---|---|
| Tracy Fleury | Jennifer Horgan | Jenna Walsh | Amanda Gates | Crystal Webster | Idylwylde Golf & Country Club, Sudbury |
| Krista McCarville | Kendra Lilly | Ashley Sippala | Sarah Potts | Oye-Sem Won Briand | Fort William Curling Club, Thunder Bay |
| Laura Payne | Stephanie Brown | Mackenzie Daley | Amanda Corkal | Laura Forget | North Bay Granite Curling Club, North Bay |
| Gale Wiseman | Marie-Eve Mongrain | Anya Hildebrandt | Danielle Piercey | Ashley MacInnes | McIntyre Curling Club, Timmins |

== Standings ==
| Skip | W | L |
|---|---|---|
| McCarville | 6 | 0 |
| Fleury | 4 | 2 |
| Payne | 2 | 4 |
| Wiseman | 0 | 6 |

== Scores ==
=== January 20 ===
Draw 1

- Fleury 13-2 Wiseman
- McCarville 9-2 Payne

=== January 21 ===
Draw 2

- McCarville 9-2 Wiseman
- Fleury 10-9 Payne

Draw 3

- Wiseman 12-5 Payne
- McCarville 7-6 Fleury

=== January 22 ===
Draw 4

- McCarville 7-1 Payne
- Fleury 11-5 Wiseman

Draw 5

- Fleury 9-3 Payne vs.
- McCarville 14-0 Wiseman

=== January 23 ===
Draw 6

- McCarville 8-6 Fleury
- Payne 9-3 Wiseman

=== Final ===
Sunday, January 23, 10:00am

| Team | 1 | 2 | 3 | 4 | 5 | 6 | 7 | 8 | 9 | 10 | Final |
|---|---|---|---|---|---|---|---|---|---|---|---|
| Tracy Fleury | 0 | 1 | 0 | 0 | 3 | 0 | 0 | 0 | 0 | X | 4 |
| Krista McCarville | 2 | 0 | 0 | 2 | 0 | 0 | 3 | 0 | 1 | X | 8 |

2016 Northern Ontario Scotties Tournament of Hearts

Krista McCarville
5th Northern Ontario Women's Championship title
