= 1982 Canadian Junior Women's Curling Championship =

- Host city: Winnipeg, Manitoba
- Arena: Winnipeg Winter Club
- Dates: March 13–19
- Winner: British Columbia
- Skip: Sandra Plut
- Third: Sandra Rainey
- Second: Leigh Fraser
- Lead: Debra Fowles
- Coach: Bob Holden
- Finalist: Ontario (Alison Goring)

The 1983 Pepsi Canadian Junior Women's Curling Championship was held March 13–19, 1982 at the Winnipeg Winter Club in Winnipeg, Manitoba.

Following the round robin portion, both Team Ontario (Alison Goring, Kristin Holman, Cheryl McPherson, Lynda Armstrong) and Team British Columbia (Sandra Plut, Sandra Rainey, Leigh Fraser, Debra Fowles) finished tied for first with identical 8–2 records. This forced a playoff tiebreaker between the two rinks to decide the champion. In the playoff, British Columbia was forced to one in the first, which was followed by Ontario blanking the next two ends. BC stole one in the fourth thanks to Ontario not being able to find their draw weight. BC stole another three in the fifth end to take a 5–0 lead, which put the game out of reach, and went on to win the game 6–3.

== Round robin standings ==
Final standings

Key
Teams to Tiebreaker

Team	Skip	Locale	W	L
Ontario	Alison Goring	Toronto	8	2
British Columbia	Sandra Plut	Kamloops	8	2
Quebec	Debbie Wark	Montreal	6	4
Manitoba	Maureen Bonar	Deloraine	6	4
Alberta	Jennifer Buchanan	Edmonton	6	4
Saskatchewan	Penny Samoleski	Nipawin	5	5
Newfoundland	Cindy Crocker	Labrador City	4	6
New Brunswick	Denise Pelrine	Moncton	4	6
Yukon/Northwest Territories	Denise Colwell	Whitehorse	3	7
Prince Edward Island	Heather Mader	Charlottetown	3	7
Nova Scotia	Jennifer Jones	Halifax	2	8

== Tiebreaker ==
March 19

Team	1	2	3	4	5	6	7	8	9	10	Final
Ontario (Goring)	0	0	0	0	0	1	0	1	1	X	3
British Columbia (Plut) 🔨	1	0	0	1	3	0	1	0	0	X	6
