= 2019 Northern Ontario Scotties Tournament of Hearts =

Women's curling championship

- Host city: Nipigon, Ontario
- Arena: Nipigon Curling Club
- Dates: January 30 – February 3
- Winner: Team McCarville
- Curling club: Fort William CC
- Skip: Krista McCarville
- Third: Kendra Lilly
- Second: Jen Gates
- Lead: Sarah Potts
- Finalist: Jenna Enge

The 2019 Northern Ontario Scotties Tournament of Hearts, the Northern Ontario women's curling championship, was held January 30 to February 3 at the Nipigon Curling Club in Nipigon. The winning Krista McCarville team represented Northern Ontario at the 2019 Scotties Tournament of Hearts in Sydney, Nova Scotia.

== Teams ==
Skip	Third	Second	Lead	Club(s)
Hailey Beaudry	Erin Tomalty	Emily Cooney	Tiana Gaudry	Fort William CC
Kira Brunton	Lyndsey Berlett	Jessica Leonard	Mikaela Cheslock	Curl Sudbury
Jenna Enge	Oye-Sem Won	Tracy Auld	Amanda Gates	Idylwylde G&CC, Port Arthur CC
Krista McCarville	Kendra Lilly	Jen Gates	Sarah Potts	Fort William CC

== Round-robin standings ==
Key
Teams to final
Teams to Tiebreaker

Skip	W	L
Krista McCarville	6	0
Kira Brunton	3	3
Jenna Enge	3	3
Hailey Beaudry	0	6

== Round-robin results ==
All draw times are listed in Eastern Time (UTC-05:00)

=== Draw 1 ===
Wednesday, January 30, 1:00pm

Sheet C	1	2	3	4	5	6	7	8	9	10	Final
Hailey Beaudry	0	0	0	0	0	0	0	X	X	X	0
Krista McCarville	0	1	1	2	2	1	2	X	X	X	9

Sheet D	1	2	3	4	5	6	7	8	9	10	Final
Kira Brunton	3	0	3	0	1	0	0	0	3	X	10
Jenna Enge	0	2	0	1	0	1	3	1	0	X	8

=== Draw 3 ===
Thursday, January 31, 10:00am

Sheet B	1	2	3	4	5	6	7	8	9	10	Final
Krista McCarville	2	1	0	0	1	0	1	2	0	X	7
Kira Brunton	0	0	0	1	0	1	0	0	1	X	3

=== Draw 5 ===
Thursday, January 31, 7:30pm

Sheet C	1	2	3	4	5	6	7	8	9	10	Final
Krista McCarville	0	0	0	0	1	0	1	0	1	X	3
Jenna Enge	0	0	0	0	0	0	0	1	0	X	1

Sheet D	1	2	3	4	5	6	7	8	9	10	Final
Hailey Beaudry	0	1	0	0	2	1	0	0	2	0	6
Kira Brunton	0	0	1	2	0	0	2	1	0	3	9

=== Draw 7 ===
Friday, February 1, 2:30pm

Sheet B	1	2	3	4	5	6	7	8	9	10	Final
Hailey Beaudry	0	1	0	0	0	2	1	0	1	X	5
Jenna Enge	1	0	2	0	2	0	0	3	0	X	8

=== Draw 8 ===
Friday, February 1, 7:30pm

Sheet A	1	2	3	4	5	6	7	8	9	10	Final
Krista McCarville	3	2	4	0	1	0	0	X	X	X	10
Hailey Beaudry	0	0	0	2	0	1	1	X	X	X	4

Sheet B	1	2	3	4	5	6	7	8	9	10	Final
Jenna Enge	1	0	2	0	0	0	2	1	2	X	8
Kira Brunton	0	4	0	0	0	1	0	0	0	X	5

=== Draw 10 ===
Saturday, February 2, 2:30pm

Sheet C	1	2	3	4	5	6	7	8	9	10	Final
Hailey Beaudry	2	0	1	0	1	0	2	0	1	0	7
Kira Brunton	0	2	0	1	0	2	0	3	0	1	9

Sheet D	1	2	3	4	5	6	7	8	9	10	Final
Krista McCarville	0	1	1	0	3	0	1	1	0	1	8
Jenna Enge	0	0	0	2	0	2	0	0	2	0	6

=== Draw 11 ===
Saturday, February 2, 7:30pm

Sheet A	1	2	3	4	5	6	7	8	9	10	Final
Krista McCarville	0	1	0	4	0	2	2	X	X	X	9
Kira Brunton	0	0	1	0	1	0	0	X	X	X	2

Sheet B	1	2	3	4	5	6	7	8	9	10	Final
Hailey Beaudry	0	1	0	1	0	0	1	0	X	X	3
Jenna Enge	2	0	2	0	3	1	0	1	X	X	9

=== Tiebreaker ===
Sunday, February 3, 8:30am

Sheet D	1	2	3	4	5	6	7	8	9	10	Final
Kira Brunton	2	0	0	0	1	0	1	0	1	0	5
Jenna Enge	0	1	1	0	0	3	0	1	0	1	7

== Final ==
Sunday, February 3, 1:00pm

Sheet C	1	2	3	4	5	6	7	8	9	10	Final
Krista McCarville	0	1	0	0	1	2	0	2	0	2	8
Jenna Enge	0	0	2	1	0	0	3	0	1	0	7

2019 Northern Ontario Scotties Tournament of Hearts

Krista McCarville
7th Northern Ontario Women's Championship title
