= 2025 Northern Ontario Women's Curling Championship =

Canadian provincial women's curling championship

- Host city: Thunder Bay, Ontario
- Arena: Port Arthur Curling Centre
- Dates: January 22–26
- Winner: Team McCarville
- Curling club: Fort William CC, Thunder Bay
- Skip: Krista McCarville
- Third: Andrea Kelly
- Second: Ashley Sippala
- Lead: Kendra Lilly
- Alternate: Sarah Potts
- Coach: Rick Lang
- Finalist: Emma Artichuk

The 2025 Northern Ontario Women's Curling Championship, the Northern Ontario women's curling championship, was held from January 22 to 26 at the Port Arthur Curling Centre in Thunder Bay, Ontario. The winning Krista McCarville rink represented Northern Ontario at the 2025 Scotties Tournament of Hearts, Canada's national women's curling championship, at the Fort William Gardens as the home team. The event was held in conjunction with the 2025 Northern Ontario Men's Provincial Curling Championship, the provincial men's championship.

== Teams ==
The teams are listed as follows:

Skip	Third	Second	Lead	Alternate	Coach	Club
Emma Artichuk	Megan Smith	Jamie Smith	Lauren Rajala		Sean Turriff	Northern Credit Union CC, Sudbury
Robyn Despins	Nicole Westlund-Stewart	Samantha Morris	Rebecca Carr		Paul Carr	Fort William CC, Thunder Bay
Claire Dubinsky	Rylie Paul	Bella McCarville	Lily Ariganello	Sam Bergamo	Rob Dubinsky	Kakabeka Falls CC, Kakabeka Falls
Laura Johnston	Mackenzie Daley	Joanne Forget	Jen Leudke	Darla Esch		North Bay GC, North Bay
Lauren Mann	Laura Forget	Candice Johnston	Stephanie Barbeau		Howard Rajala	McIntyre CC, Timmins
Krista McCarville	Andrea Kelly	Ashley Sippala	Kendra Lilly	Sarah Potts	Rick Lang	Fort William CC, Thunder Bay
Ashley Palmer	Oye-Sem Won	Corie Adamson	Jessica Langlais	Tirzah Baird	Al Hackner	Fort William CC, Thunder Bay

=== Map of teams ===
Northern Ontario Women's Curling Championship Teams

== Round robin standings ==
Final Round Robin Standings

Key
Teams to Playoffs

Skip	W	L	PF	PA	EW	EL	BE	SE
Emma Artichuk	5	1	47	25	26	18	4	10
Krista McCarville	5	1	50	27	26	20	4	8
Robyn Despins	5	1	42	32	26	20	2	10
Lauren Mann	3	3	49	37	26	26	5	9
Ashley Palmer	1	4	26	37	17	17	3	8
Claire Dubinsky	1	5	22	50	18	24	3	5
Laura Johnston	0	5	16	44	11	25	2	1

== Round robin results ==
All draws are listed in Eastern Time (UTC−05:00).

=== Draw 3 ===
Wednesday, January 22, 4:00 pm

Sheet 4	1	2	3	4	5	6	7	8	9	10	Final
Krista McCarville 🔨	0	1	0	2	0	2	0	3	1	X	9
Claire Dubinsky	0	0	1	0	1	0	1	0	0	X	3

Sheet 5	1	2	3	4	5	6	7	8	9	10	Final
Laura Johnston	0	0	2	0	0	1	1	0	0	X	4
Lauren Mann 🔨	0	1	0	1	4	0	0	2	3	X	11

Sheet 6	1	2	3	4	5	6	7	8	9	10	Final
Robyn Despins	1	0	0	0	2	0	0	X	X	X	3
Emma Artichuk 🔨	0	2	1	2	0	4	1	X	X	X	10

=== Draw 5 ===
Thursday, January 23, 9:00 am

Sheet 3	1	2	3	4	5	6	7	8	9	10	Final
Emma Artichuk 🔨	2	1	1	0	0	0	0	0	1	2	7
Lauren Mann	0	0	0	1	2	1	0	2	0	0	6

Sheet 4	1	2	3	4	5	6	7	8	9	10	Final
Robyn Despins 🔨	2	1	0	0	1	1	0	3	X	X	8
Laura Johnston	0	0	0	1	0	0	2	0	X	X	3

Sheet 6	1	2	3	4	5	6	7	8	9	10	Final
Krista McCarville 🔨	0	0	2	2	1	0	0	0	3	X	8
Ashley Palmer	0	0	0	0	0	1	1	1	0	X	3

=== Draw 7 ===
Thursday, January 23, 7:30 pm

Sheet 5	1	2	3	4	5	6	7	8	9	10	Final
Ashley Palmer	0	1	1	0	0	0	2	0	0	X	4
Robyn Despins 🔨	1	0	0	1	2	0	0	3	2	X	9

Sheet 6	1	2	3	4	5	6	7	8	9	10	Final
Claire Dubinsky	0	0	1	0	2	0	0	0	X	X	3
Lauren Mann 🔨	0	1	0	2	0	1	2	2	X	X	8

Sheet 7	1	2	3	4	5	6	7	8	9	10	Final
Krista McCarville	0	0	1	0	2	1	0	3	0	2	9
Emma Artichuk 🔨	1	1	0	1	0	0	1	0	2	0	6

=== Draw 8 ===
Friday, January 24, 9:30 am

Sheet 3	1	2	3	4	5	6	7	8	9	10	Final
Laura Johnston	0	0	0	1	0	X	X	X	X	X	1
Krista McCarville 🔨	2	1	1	0	6	X	X	X	X	X	10

Sheet 4	1	2	3	4	5	6	7	8	9	10	Final
Claire Dubinsky	1	0	0	0	0	1	X	X	X	X	2
Robyn Despins 🔨	0	1	3	1	2	0	X	X	X	X	7

Sheet 7	1	2	3	4	5	6	7	8	9	10	11	Final
Lauren Mann	0	0	3	0	0	0	0	0	0	2	3	8
Ashley Palmer 🔨	1	0	0	0	1	0	1	1	1	0	0	5

=== Draw 10 ===
Friday, January 24, 7:00 pm

Sheet 4	1	2	3	4	5	6	7	8	9	10	Final
Ashley Palmer	0	0	0	1	0	1	0	X	X	X	2
Emma Artichuk 🔨	0	0	2	0	2	0	5	X	X	X	9

Sheet 6	1	2	3	4	5	6	7	8	9	10	Final
Laura Johnston 🔨	1	0	0	1	0	4	0	0	0	0	6
Claire Dubinsky	0	2	2	0	1	0	0	1	1	1	8

Sheet 7	1	2	3	4	5	6	7	8	9	10	Final
Robyn Despins	1	0	0	0	3	0	1	0	0	1	6
Krista McCarville 🔨	0	2	0	0	0	1	0	0	2	0	5

=== Draw 11 ===
Saturday, January 25, 9:30 am

Sheet 3	1	2	3	4	5	6	7	8	9	10	Final
Claire Dubinsky	0	0	2	1	0	0	0	0	X	X	3
Ashley Palmer 🔨	0	2	0	0	4	0	3	3	X	X	12

Sheet 5	1	2	3	4	5	6	7	8	9	10	Final
Emma Artichuk 🔨	1	0	0	2	0	1	2	1	X	X	7
Laura Johnston	0	0	1	0	1	0	0	0	X	X	2

Sheet 6	1	2	3	4	5	6	7	8	9	10	11	Final
Lauren Mann 🔨	2	0	0	1	0	1	0	2	0	2	0	8
Robyn Despins	0	3	1	0	1	0	2	0	1	0	1	9

=== Draw 13 ===
Saturday, January 25, 7:00 pm

Sheet 4	1	2	3	4	5	6	7	8	9	10	Final
Lauren Mann 🔨	0	1	2	0	2	0	0	0	3	0	8
Krista McCarville	0	0	0	2	0	1	1	1	0	4	9

Sheet 7	1	2	3	4	5	6	7	8	9	10	Final
Emma Artichuk	0	1	0	0	3	0	4	0	X	X	8
Claire Dubinsky 🔨	0	0	1	0	0	1	0	1	X	X	3

Team	Final
Laura Johnston	/
Ashley Palmer	/

As both Johnston and Palmer were already eliminated from contention, the game was deemed unnecessary and not played

== Playoffs ==
Semifinal			Final
			1	Emma Artichuk	5
2	Krista McCarville	9	2	Krista McCarville	6
3	Robyn Despins	4

=== Semifinal ===
Sunday, January 26, 9:00 am

Sheet 6	1	2	3	4	5	6	7	8	9	10	Final
Krista McCarville 🔨	0	3	0	2	0	3	0	0	1	X	9
Robyn Despins	0	0	1	0	1	0	1	1	0	X	4

=== Final ===
Sunday, January 26, 1:30 pm

Sheet 4	1	2	3	4	5	6	7	8	9	10	Final
Emma Artichuk 🔨	2	0	1	0	1	0	0	0	1	0	5
Krista McCarville	0	1	0	1	0	1	1	1	0	1	6

2025 Northern Ontario Women's Curling Championship

Krista McCarville
11th Northern Ontario Provincial Championship title
