= Krista Scharf =

Canadian curler (born 1982)

Krista Lee Scharf
- Curler
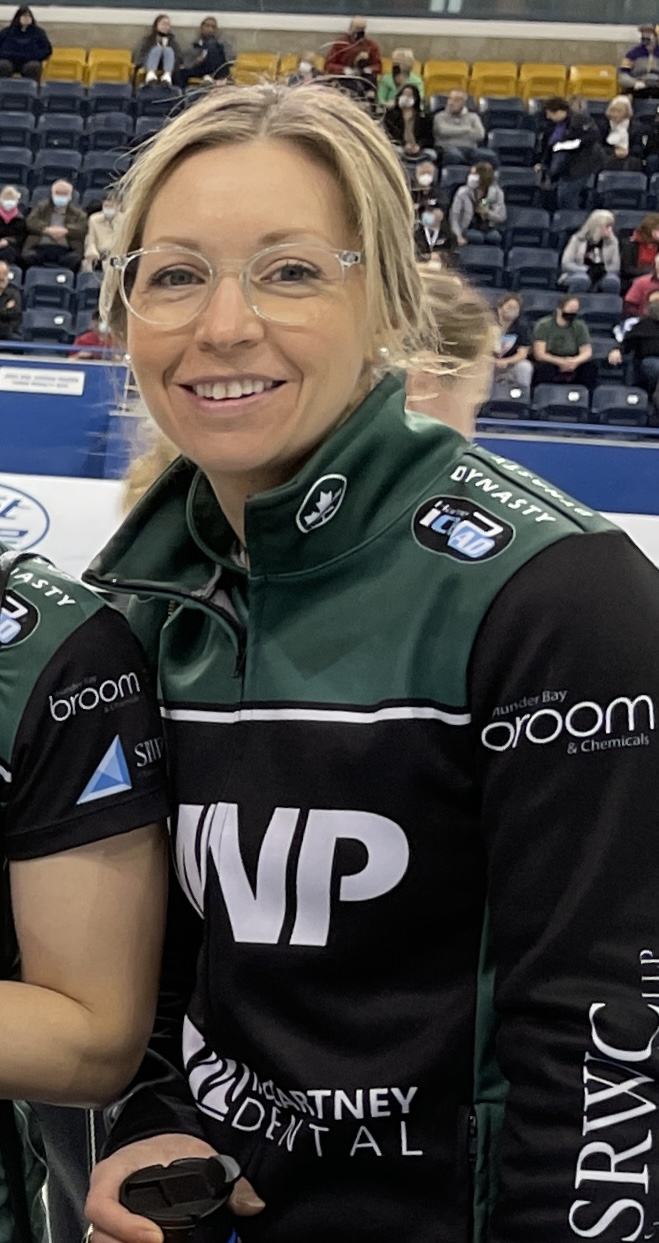
- Scharf at the 2022 Players' Championship
- Born: Krista Lee Scharf; November 10, 1982 (age 44); Thunder Bay, Ontario, Canada

Curling career
- Member Association: Northern Ontario
- Hearts: 13 (2006, 2007, 2009, 2010, 2016, 2017, 2019, 2020, 2022, 2023, 2024, 2025, 2026)
- Top CTRS ranking: 7th (2009–10)
Medal record
Curling
Representing Canada
World University Games
Silver medal – second place	2003 Tarvisio
Representing Northern Ontario
Scotties Tournament of Hearts
Silver medal – second place	2016 Grande Prairie
Silver medal – second place	2022 Thunder Bay
Bronze medal – third place	2023 Kamloops
Representing Ontario
Scotties Tournament of Hearts
Bronze medal – third place	2010 Sault Ste. Marie
Canadian Olympic Curling Trials
Bronze medal – third place	2009 Edmonton
Bronze medal – third place	2021 Saskatoon

Krista Lee Scharf, also known by her married name of Krista McCarville (born November 10, 1982) is a Canadian curler from Thunder Bay, Ontario. McCarville is a four-time Northern Ontario junior champion, the 2003 Winter Universiade silver medallist, a four-time Ontario provincial champion, an 11-time Northern Ontario provincial champion, and a four-time Canadian national medallist.

During her junior career, Scharf competed at four Canadian Junior Curling Championships for Team Northern Ontario, skipping three times (2000, 2001, and 2002), and playing second once (1998). Throughout her women's career, Scharf has competed in the Scotties Tournament of Hearts, the Canadian women's national curling championships, ten times, all as a skip. Before 2015, Northern Ontario did not compete at the Tournament of Hearts separately from Ontario; Scharf represented Ontario four times at the championships (2006, 2007, 2009, and 2010), winning bronze in 2010. She has skipped the Northern Ontario team eight times (2016, 2017, 2019, 2020, 2022, 2023, 2024, and 2025), winning silver in 2016 and 2022. She has also competed in three Canadian Olympic Curling Trials, finishing in third place twice (2009 and 2021) and fifth place once (2017).

Scharf and her rink are known for doing well at major tournaments such as the Scotties and Olympic Trials, despite not playing many tour events. Their team mission has been to be the "best 'amateur' team in the World".

== Career ==
=== Junior career ===
Scharf started curling at the age of ten at the Fort William Curling Club. She represented Northern Ontario in four Canadian Junior Curling Championships. In 1998, she played second for Elaine Uhryn and finished with a 7–5 record, out of playoffs. She skipped her own team in 2000, 2001, and 2002, finishing with a 7–5 record in both 2000 and 2001, and a 6–6 record in 2002. In 2003, she and her team from Lakehead University represented Canada at the Winter Universiade in Tarvisio, Italy. The team won the silver medal, losing to Olga Jarkova's team from Russia in the final.

=== Women's career (2005–2013) ===
Scharf competed in her first women's provincial championship at the 2004 Ontario Scott Tournament of Hearts (before 2015, there was no separate Northern Ontario team at the national Tournament of Hearts), missing the playoffs. She also played third for Northern Ontario, skipped by her brother Joe Scharf, at the 2005 Canadian Mixed Curling Championship. They finished out of the playoffs. In 2005, she placed second at the 2005 Ontario Scott Tournament of Hearts, losing the final to Jenn Hanna.

Leading up to the 2005–06 curling season, Lorraine Lang asked Scharf to skip her team, with former skip Tara George moving up the lineup, which Scharf accepted. That season, she competed in her first Grand Slam at the 2005 Casinos of Winnipeg Curling Classic (no longer a Grand Slam event), where her team placed third. In 2006, she won the 2006 Ontario Scott Tournament of Hearts, earning the right to represent Ontario at the 2006 Scott Tournament of Hearts. There, her team finished with a 4–7 record.

The following season, Scharf competed at the 2006 Trail Appliances Autumn Gold Curling Classic, finishing with a 4–3 record and out of the playoffs. She won the Ontario Tournament of Hearts again in 2007, and improved on her previous record at the 2007 Scotties Tournament of Hearts, finishing the round robin with a 6–5 record and losing the tie-breaker to Team Alberta, skipped by Cheryl Bernard.

During the 2007–08 season, Scharf placed third at the Casinos of Winnipeg Curling Classic. Her team placed second at the 2008 Ontario Scotties Tournament of Hearts, losing the final to Sherry Middaugh. She also made the final of the 2008 Players' Championship Grand Slam, which she lost to Amber Holland.

The next season, Scharf's team missed the playoffs at the 2008 Casinos of Winnipeg Classic and the 2008 Sobeys Slam. In 2009, she once again won the right to represent Ontario at the national Scotties Tournament of Hearts, for the third time in four years, after winning the 2009 Ontario Scotties Tournament of Hearts. At the 2009 Scotties Tournament of Hearts in Victoria, British Columbia, she again finished 6–5, missing the playoffs. At the 2009 Players' Championship, her team reached the quarterfinals, where they lost to Kelly Scott.

In 2009, Scharf and her team won the second qualifying spot at the Road to the Roar (the Canadian Olympic Curling Pre-Trials) in Prince George, British Columbia, earning them one of eight spots in Edmonton, Alberta for the Roar of the Rings, the 2009 Canadian Olympic Curling Trials. There, her team finished the round robin in a tie for third place. They played in the first tie-breaker against Team Lawton of Saskatoon. After beating Team Lawton, they moved on to the second tie-breaker against Team Amber Holland of Kronau, Saskatchewan, which they won. They then played in their third game of the day, the semi-final against Shannon Kleibrink from Calgary, and lost, ending their run at the Olympic Trials. A month later, the 2010 Ontario Scotties Tournament of Hearts took place at home for Team McCarville, in Thunder Bay. After going undefeated in the round robin, they earned an automatic bye into the provincial final, where they beat Team Horgan of Sudbury to finish the tournament undefeated. It was the first time in provincial history that a team went undefeated. With the win, she claimed her fourth trip to the Scotties Tournament of Hearts in five years. At the 2010 Scotties Tournament of Hearts in Sault Ste. Marie, Ontario, Scharf's Ontario team finished the round robin in a tie for fourth place. They defeated Team Manitoba, skipped by Jill Thurston, in a tie-breaker. Their next opponent was Team British Columbia (Kelly Scott) in the 3 vs. 4 page playoff game. After beating Team B.C., they faced Prince Edward Island, skipped by Kathy O'Rourke, in the semi-final, losing 10–6. That season, her team also made the semi-final of the 2009 Manitoba Lotteries Women's Curling Classic.

Scharf competed in her first Canada Cup in 2010, losing the 3 vs. 4 page playoff game to Stefanie Lawton. She lost the final of the 2011 Ontario Scotties Tournament of Hearts to Rachel Homan's team from Ottawa. That season on the World Curling Tour, Scharf's team won the Molson Cash Spiel. The following season, she competed in two Grand Slams, making the semi-final of the 2011 Curlers Corner Autumn Gold Curling Classic and missing playoffs at the 2011 Manitoba Lotteries Women's Curling Classic. She also placed fourth at the 2012 Ontario Scotties Tournament of Hearts after losing the 3 vs. 4 page playoff game to Sherry Middaugh.

In the 2012–13 season, Scharf's team missed the playoffs at all three Grand Slams that they competed in (the 2012 Curlers Corner Autumn Gold Curling Classic, 2012 Manitoba Lotteries Women's Curling Classic, and 2012 Masters). Outside of Grand Slams, they won the 2012 Molson Cash Spiel on the World Curling Tour, defeating Becca Hamilton in the final. They lost the 3 vs. 4 page playoff game to Sherry Middaugh for the second year in a row at the 2013 Ontario Scotties Tournament of Hearts. On February 13, 2013, Scharf announced that she was taking a year or more off from curling to spend time with her two young children and to concentrate on her teaching career. She briefly returned to competitive curling upon earning a berth into the 2013 Canadian Olympic Curling Pre-Trials, where her team missed the playoffs.

=== Women's career (2015–2026) ===
Scharf returned to competitive curling for the 2015–16 curling season, winning four events on the World Curling Tour: the 2015 Colonial Square Ladies Classic, Molson Cash Spiel, and Curl Mesabi Classic, and the 2016 U.S. Open of Curling. She highlighted her return by winning the 2016 Northern Ontario Scotties Tournament of Hearts in Timmins. She beat defending champion Tracy Fleury twice in the round robin, then scored three points in the seventh end of the final to defeat Team Fleury 8–4. Scharf and her team finished undefeated in nine matches at the event. With the title, the team earned their right to compete in the 2016 Scotties Tournament of Hearts in Grand Prairie, Alberta, Scharf's fifth trip to the national tournament, but first representing Northern Ontario (only Ontario as a whole was represented at the Scotties prior to the inaugural 2015 Northern Ontario Scotties Tournament of Hearts). Scharf and her team of vice-skip Kendra Lilly, second Ashley Sippala, lead Sarah Potts, fifth Oye-Sem Won Briand and coach Lorraine Lang made it to the final of the 2016 Hearts, where they lost to Alberta's Chelsea Carey, settling for a silver medal. The team also competed at the 2016 Humpty's Champions Cup Grand Slam, finishing with a 1–3 record and out of the playoffs.

Scharf competed in two Grand Slams in the 2016–17 season, the 2016 Tour Challenge Tier 2, where she was the runner-up, and the 2016 Boost National, where she lost in a semi-final to Silvana Tirinzoni. She also won the 2017 Northern Ontario Scotties Tournament of Hearts, sending her team to represent Northern Ontario at the 2017 Scotties Tournament of Hearts. She led her team to an 8–3 round robin record, and defeated Chelsea Carey's Team Canada in the 3 vs. 4 page playoff, but then lost to Rachel Homan (Team Ontario) in the semi-final. The bronze medal game was a rematch against Carey, which she lost.

Team McCarville won the first qualifying game at the 2017 Canadian Olympic Pre-trials, qualifying for the Olympic Trials in Ottawa. There, she led her team to a 4–4 record, missing the playoffs. On tour that season, they were finalists at the AMJ Campbell Shorty Jenkins Classic and semi-finalists at the Stu Sells Toronto Tankard. At the 2018 Northern Ontario Scotties Tournament of Hearts, she made the final, losing to Tracy Fleury.

In the 2018–19 season, Scharf's team won two events on the World Curling Tour, the KW Fall Classic and the Curl Mesabi Classic. She also competed at the 2018 Tour Challenge Tier 1 Grand Slam, finishing with a 1–3 record. She also won the 2019 Northern Ontario Scotties Tournament of Hearts, sending her team once again to represent Northern Ontario at the Scotties. There, she led her team to an 8–3 record, ending the championship pool in fourth place, earning her a spot in the playoffs. In the 3 vs. 4 game, Scharf and her rink lost to Team Ontario's Rachel Homan. At the Scotties, Scharf was named the Second Team All-Star skip based on her shooting percentage throughout the event.

Scharf's team once again won the Northern Ontario provincial championship the following year at the 2020 Northern Ontario Scotties Tournament of Hearts, which qualified them for the 2020 Scotties Tournament of Hearts in Moose Jaw, Saskatchewan. In her round robin win against Laura Walker's Team Alberta, Scharf shot a perfect game. Her team once again lost the 3 vs. 4 game to Ontario and Homan for the second year in a row. That season on tour, they defended their title at the Curl Mesabi Classic and were runners-up at the Royal LePage Women's Fall Classic and the Stroud Sleeman Cash Spiel.

The 2021 Northern Ontario provincial playdowns were cancelled due to the COVID-19 pandemic in Ontario. As the 2020 provincial champions, Scharf's team was given an automatic invitation to represent Northern Ontario at the 2021 Scotties Tournament of Hearts in Calgary. However, the team declined the invitation, citing family and work priorities.

Team McCarville had enough points to qualify for the 2021 Canadian Olympic Curling Pre-Trials. There, they went 5–1 through the round robin, qualifying for the playoffs. The team had two impressive come-from-behind wins in their two playoff games. In their first game against the Mackenzie Zacharias rink, they were down 7–3 heading into the tenth end, but scored four points, then stole a point in the extra end to win the match. In their second game against Jacqueline Harrison, the team gave up five points in the second end to trail 5–1, but rallied back to win the game 9–6. With the win, they qualified for the 2021 Canadian Olympic Curling Trials, held November 20 to 28 in Saskatoon, Saskatchewan. At the Trials, the team went through the round robin with a 4–4 record. This earned them a spot in the second tiebreaker where they defeated Kerri Einarson 4–3. In the semifinal, they lost 8–3 to Jennifer Jones, eliminating them from contention. The 2022 Northern Ontario Scotties Tournament of Hearts was cancelled due to the pandemic and Team McCarville were selected to represent their province at the national women's championship. At the 2022 Scotties Tournament of Hearts, Scharf led her rink to a 5–3 round robin record, enough to qualify for the playoffs. The team then won both of their seeding round games and defeated New Brunswick's Andrea Crawford in the 1 vs. 2 page playoff game to qualify for the final where they faced the Einarson rink. There, they could not keep their momentum going, losing the Scotties final 9–6. They wrapped up their season at the 2022 Players' Championship where they missed the playoffs.

With their success at the Olympic Trials and Scotties, the McCarville rink racked up enough points to qualify for the first Slam of the 2022–23 season, the 2022 National. There, they finished with a 1–3 record, defeating Hollie Duncan in their lone win. The team also qualified for the 2022 Tour Challenge Tier 2 event, winning one game against Denmark's Madeleine Dupont. In December, Team McCarville competed in the Curl Mesabi Classic where they went undefeated until the final, losing 5–3 to the United States' Tabitha Peterson. Next for the team was the 2023 Northern Ontario Scotties Tournament of Hearts. There, they finished first through the round robin with a 5–1 record, earning them a spot in the 1 vs. 2 game. They defeated Jackie McCormick to advance to the final where they topped Krysta Burns 9–4, securing their spot in the 2023 Scotties Tournament of Hearts in Kamloops, British Columbia. At the Hearts, the team topped their pool with a 7–1 record before defeating Nova Scotia's Christina Black in the page seeding game to reach the 1 vs. 2 game for a second straight year. However, they lost both the page playoff and semifinal to Manitoba's Jennifer Jones and Canada's Kerri Einarson respectively, settling for bronze.

For the 2023–24 season, Team McCarville added New Brunswick native Andrea Kelly as their new third, with Lilly, Sippala and Potts rotating on the front-end. The team had immediate success together, winning the 2023 KW Fall Classic by defeating Scotland's Rebecca Morrison. They also had a quarterfinal finish at the North Grenville Women's Fall Curling Classic, losing out to Hailey Armstrong. In the new year, the team again won the 2024 Northern Ontario Scotties Tournament of Hearts with ease, going undefeated to claim their fourth straight title at the event. At the 2024 Scotties Tournament of Hearts in Calgary, the team had mixed results. Sitting 4–3 heading into their last round robin game, they lost to Manitoba's Kaitlyn Lawes 6–5. This created a five-way tie for third with Lawes, British Columbia, Quebec, and Saskatchewan. With tiebreaker games abolished and the first tiebreaker (which was head-to-head between all tied teams) tied as well at 2–2, cumulative last stone draw distance between all the teams was used to decide who would make the playoffs. The McCarville rink finished with a total of 370.3 but would miss the playoffs as the Lawes rink finished first with a 231.6.

Team McCarville reached the final in their first event of the 2024–25 season, losing to Japan's Miyu Ueno at the Mother Club Fall Curling Classic. They next played in the 2024 Stu Sells Toronto Tankard where they were taken out by eventual champion Kim Eun-jung in the quarterfinals. In November 2024, they won the Stu Sells Living Waters Collingwood Classic, going undefeated to claim the title. At the 2025 Northern Ontario Women's Curling Championship, the team finished the round robin in a three-way tie for first place. After beating Robyn Despins in the semifinal, the McCarville rink scored one in the tenth end of the final to defeat Emma Artichuk 6–5, securing their fifth consecutive Northern Ontario women's title. This qualified them for the 2025 Scotties Tournament of Hearts which was played at the Fort William Gardens, adjacent to the Fort William Curling Club they curl out of. There, the team had a disappointing start, losing their first four games. They then won their last four games, however, it was not enough to qualify for the playoffs. A week after the event, the team announced Andrea Kelly stepped away from the team and returned to New Brunswick. Scharf announced her retirement at the end of the 2025–26 season.

=== Comeback (2026–present) ===
On Aug. 10, 2026, it was announced Scharf would take over skip stones for Team Despins for the 2026–27 season, alongside third Robyn Despins, second Abby Dechene and lead Rebecca Carr.

== Personal life ==
Scharf is a teacher at the Holy Family School in Thunder Bay. She was married to her 2005 Canadian Mixed Curling Championship teammate Mike McCarville and has two children. Her brother Joe Scharf is also a curler; he played second on Al Hackner's Northern Ontario team at the 2001 Brier. Her parents are Linda and Ralph Scharf. She is a graduate of Westgate Collegiate & Vocational Institute and Lakehead University.

On the way back to Thunder Bay following the 2020 Scotties Tournament of Hearts, Scharf, teammate Ashley Sippala, and coach Rick Lang survived a plane crash in Dryden, Ontario.

== Year-by-year statistics ==
Year	Team	Position	Event	Finish	Record	Pct. (Note: Round robin only)
1998	Uhryn (PACC)	Second	Northern Ontario Juniors	1st	N/A	–
1998	Northern Ontario (Uhryn)	Second	Canadian Juniors	6th	7–5	69
2000	Scharf (FWCC)	Skip	Northern Ontario Juniors	1st	N/A	–
2000	Northern Ontario (Scharf)	Skip	Canadian Juniors	6th	7–5	63
2001	Scharf (FWCC)	Skip	Northern Ontario Juniors	1st	N/A	–
2001	Northern Ontario (Scharf)	Skip	Canadian Juniors	5th	7–5	73
2002	Scharf (FWCC)	Skip	Northern Ontario Juniors	1st	N/A	–
2002	Northern Ontario (Scharf)	Skip	Canadian Juniors	8th	6–6	70
2002	Lakehead (Scharf)	Skip	Canadian University	1st	N/A	–
2003	Canada (Scharf)	Skip	Winter Universiade	2nd	6–3	–
2004	Scharf (PACC)	Skip	Ontario STOH	8th	3–6	–
2005 (Note: Event occurred in the 2004 calendar year, but was billed as the 2005 edition.)	J. Scharf (PACC)	Third	Northern Ontario Mixed	1st	N/A	–
2005	Northern Ontario (J. Scharf)	Third	Canadian Mixed	8th	5–6	77
2005	Scharf (FWCC)	Skip	Ontario STOH	2nd	7–4	–
2006	Scharf (FWCC)	Skip	Ontario STOH	1st	9–2	–
2006	Ontario (Scharf)	Skip	2006 STOH	10th	4–7	66
2007	Scharf (FWCC)	Skip	Ontario STOH	1st	9–2	–
2007	Ontario (Scharf)	Skip	2007 STOH	6th	6–6	69
2008	McCarville (FWCC)	Skip	Ontario STOH	2nd	7–4	–
2009	McCarville (FWCC)	Skip	Ontario STOH	1st	8–3	–
2009	Ontario (McCarville)	Skip	2009 STOH	6th	6–5	75
2009	McCarville	Skip	COCT – Pre	2nd	4–1	80
2009	McCarville	Skip	2009 COCT	3rd	6–4	78
2010	McCarville (FWCC)	Skip	Ontario STOH	1st	11–0	–
2010	Ontario (McCarville)	Skip	2010 STOH	3rd	9–5	75
2010	McCarville (FWCC)	Skip	Canada Cup	4th	3–3	–
2011	McCarville (FWCC)	Skip	Ontario STOH	2nd	8–4	–
2012	McCarville (FWCC)	Skip	Ontario STOH	4th	6–4	–
2013	McCarville (FWCC)	Skip	Ontario STOH	4th	5–5	–
2013	McCarville	Skip	COCT – Pre	DNQ	2–3	72
2016	McCarville (FWCC)	Skip	Northern Ontario STOH	1st	7–0	–
2016	Northern Ontario (McCarville)	Skip	2016 STOH	2nd	9–5	80
2017	McCarville (FWCC)	Skip	Northern Ontario STOH	1st	6–1	–
2017	Northern Ontario (McCarville)	Skip	2017 STOH	4th	9–5	81
2017	McCarville	Skip	COCT – Pre	1st	6–2	80
2017	McCarville	Skip	2017 COCT	5th	4–4	82
2018	McCarville (FWCC)	Skip	Northern Ontario STOH	2nd	3–2	–
2019	McCarville (FWCC)	Skip	Northern Ontario STOH	1st	7–0	–
2019	Northern Ontario (McCarville)	Skip	2019 STOH	4th	8–4	82
2020	McCarville (FWCC)	Skip	Northern Ontario STOH	1st	7–0	–
2020	Northern Ontario (McCarville)	Skip	2020 STOH	4th	8–4	78
2021	McCarville	Skip	COCT – Pre	1st	7–1	78
2021	McCarville	Skip	2021 COCT	3rd	5–5	79
2022	Northern Ontario (McCarville)	Skip	2022 STOH	2nd	8–4	72
2023	McCarville (FWCC)	Skip	Northern Ontario STOH	1st	7–1	–
2023	Northern Ontario (McCarville)	Skip	2023 STOH	3rd	8–3	78
2024	McCarville (FWCC)	Skip	Northern Ontario STOH	1st	6–0	–
2024	Northern Ontario (McCarville)	Skip	2024 STOH	T8th	4–4	74
2025	McCarville (FWCC)	Skip	Northern Ontario Women's	1st	7–1	–
2025	Northern Ontario (McCarville)	Skip	2025 STOH	T9th	4–4	74
Scotties Tournament of Hearts Totals					83–56	75
Olympic Curling Trial Totals					15–13	80

== Teams ==
=== Women's ===
Season	Skip	Third	Second	Lead	Alternate	Coach
1997–98	Elaine Uhryn	Kari MacLean	Krista Scharf	Amy Stachiw		
1999–00	Krista Scharf	Angie Del Pino	Laura Armitage	Maggie Carr		
2000–01	Krista Scharf	Angie Del Pino	Laura Armitage	Maggie Carr		
2001–02	Krista Scharf	Julie Risi	Laura Armitage	Maggie Carr		Bill Charlebois
2002–03	Krista Scharf	Amy Stachiw	Laura Armitage	Maggie Carr		Bill Charlebois
2003–04	Krista Scharf	Angie Del Pino	Ashley Kallos	Laura Armitage		
2004–05	Krista Scharf	Angie Del Pino	Leesa Broder	Laura Armitage		
2005–06	Krista Scharf	Tara George	Tiffany Stubbings	Lorraine Lang	Michelle Boland	
2006–07	Krista Scharf	Tara George	Tiffany Stubbings	Lorraine Lang	Heather Houston	Tom Coulterman
2007–08	Krista McCarville	Tara George	Kari MacLean	Lorraine Lang		
2008–09	Krista McCarville	Tara George	Kari MacLean	Lorraine Lang	Ashley Miharija	
2009–10	Krista McCarville	Tara George	Kari MacLean (ROTR); Ashley Miharija (STOH)	Lorraine Lang (ROTR); Kari MacLean (STOH)	Ashley Miharija (ROTR); Sarah Lang (STOH)	Rick Lang
2010–11	Krista McCarville	Ashley Miharija	Kari Lavoie	Sarah Lang		
2011–12	Krista McCarville	Ashley Miharija	Kari Lavoie (Note: Lavoie did not compete at the 2012 Ontario Scotties Tournament of Hearts, moving Lang up to second and bringing in Liz Kingston at lead.); Sarah Lang (ON STOH)	Sarah Lang; Liz Kingston (ON STOH)		
2012–13	Krista McCarville	Ashley Miharija	Kari Lavoie	Sarah Lang		
2013	Krista McCarville	Ashley Miharija	Kari Lavoie	Sarah Potts	Tirzah Keffer	
2015–16	Krista McCarville	Kendra Lilly	Ashley Sippala	Sarah Potts	Oye-Sem Won Briand (Note: Won Briand replaced Lilly at third in the Tbaytel Major League of Curling.)	Lorraine Lang
2016–17	Krista McCarville	Kendra Lilly	Ashley Sippala	Sarah Potts	Oye-Sem Won Briand	Lorraine Lang
2017–18	Krista McCarville	Kendra Lilly	Ashley Sippala	Sarah Potts		
2018–19	Krista McCarville	Kendra Lilly	Ashley Sippala (Note: Sippala was replaced by Gates mid-season for maternity leave.); Jen Gates	Sarah Potts	Lorraine Lang	Rick Lang
2019–20	Krista McCarville	Kendra Lilly	Ashley Sippala	Jen Gates		Rick Lang
2020–21	Krista McCarville	Kendra Lilly	Ashley Sippala	Sarah Potts		
2021–22	Krista McCarville	Kendra Lilly	Ashley Sippala	Sarah Potts	Jen Gates	Rick Lang
2022–23	Krista McCarville	Kendra Lilly	Ashley Sippala	Sarah Potts		Rick Lang
2023–24	Krista McCarville	Andrea Kelly	Kendra Lilly	Ashley Sippala	Sarah Potts	Rick Lang
2024–25	Krista McCarville	Andrea Kelly	Ashley Sippala	Kendra Lilly	Sarah Potts	Rick Lang
2025–26	Krista Scharf	Kendra Lilly	Ashley Sippala	Sarah Potts		Rick Lang

=== Open and mixed ===
Season	Skip	Third	Second	Lead
2004–05	Joe Scharf	Krista Scharf	Mike McCarville	Amy Stachiw
2014–15	Krista McCarville	Joe Scharf	Chris Briand	Ashley Miharija
2016–17	Krista McCarville	Joe Scharf	Ashley Sippala	Sarah Potts
2017–18	Krista McCarville	Joe Scharf	Ashley Sippala	Sarah Potts
2018–19	Krista McCarville	Ashley Sippala	Sarah Potts	Rick Lang
2019–20	Krista McCarville	Jordan Potts	Ashley Sippala	Rick Lang
2020–21	Krista McCarville	Jordan Potts	Ashley Sippala	Sarah Potts

== Grand Slam record ==
Key
C	Champion
F	Lost in Final
SF	Lost in Semifinal
QF	Lost in Quarterfinals
R16	Lost in the round of 16
Q	Did not advance to playoffs
T2	Played in Tier 2 event
DNP	Did not participate in event
N/A	Not a Grand Slam event that season

Event	2007–08	2008–09	2009–10	2010–11	2011–12	2012–13	2013–14	2014–15	2015–16	2016–17	2017–18	2018–19	2019–20	2020–21	2021–22	2022–23
The National	N/A	N/A	N/A	N/A	N/A	N/A	N/A	N/A	DNP	SF	DNP	DNP	DNP	N/A	DNP	Q
Tour Challenge	N/A	N/A	N/A	N/A	N/A	N/A	N/A	N/A	DNP	T2	DNP	Q	DNP	N/A	N/A	T2
Masters	N/A	N/A	N/A	N/A	N/A	Q	DNP	DNP	DNP	DNP	DNP	DNP	DNP	N/A	DNP	DNP
Players'	F	QF	DNP	DNP	DNP	DNP	DNP	DNP	DNP	DNP	DNP	DNP	N/A	DNP	Q	DNP
Champions Cup	N/A	N/A	N/A	N/A	N/A	N/A	N/A	N/A	Q	DNP	DNP	DNP	N/A	DNP	DNP	DNP

=== Former events ===
Event	2006–07	2007–08	2008–09	2009–10	2010–11	2011–12	2012–13
Sobeys Slam	N/A	DNP	Q	N/A	DNP	N/A	N/A
Autumn Gold	Q	DNP	DNP	DNP	DNP	SF	Q
Manitoba Lotteries	DNP	SF	Q	SF	DNP	Q	Q
