= Alison Goring =

Canadian curler

- Curler
- Born: November 15, 1963 (age 62); Toronto, Ontario, Canada

Team
- Curling club: Bayview Golf and Country Club, Thornhill, Ontario
- Skip: Alison Goring
- Fourth: Mary Chilvers
- Third: Colleen Madonia
- Second: Jane Hooper Perroud

Curling career
- Member Association: Ontario
- Hearts: 4 (1990, 1991, 1995, 1997)
- World Championship: 1 (1990)
Medal record
Representing Canada
Women's Curling
World championships
Bronze medal – third place	1990 Västerås	Team
Representing Ontario
Scott Tournament of Hearts
Gold medal – first place	1990 Ottawa
Silver medal – second place	1997 Vancouver
Canada Games
Gold medal – first place	1983 Saguenay/Lac-Saint-Jean

Alison Goring (born November 15, 1963) is a Canadian curler.

== Career ==
=== Youth ===
As a junior curler, Goring won a gold medal at the 1983 Canada Winter Games and followed that up with a win at the 1983 Canadian Junior Women's Curling Championship. She was also the runner-up at the 1982 Canadian Junior Women's Curling Championship.

=== 1990–1997 ===
Goring is a former Canadian champion skip, having won the 1990 Scott Tournament of Hearts.

Goring won her first provincial championship in 1990. Her Ontario rink would with that years' Scott Tournament of Hearts, defeating the Nova Scotia team, skipped by Heather Rankin. Her win gave her the right to represent Canada at the 1990 World Championships. At the 1990 Worlds, they lost to Norway's Dordi Nordby in the semi-final.

Her Hearts win in 1990 gave her team the right to represent team Canada at the 1991 Scott Tournament of Hearts. At that tournament, her team finished with 6 wins and 5 losses. She returned to the Hearts in 1995, finishing with a 7–4 record, just missing the playoffs. The 1997 Scott Tournament of Hearts was her last to date, losing to Sandra Schmirler's Saskatchewan rink in the final.

Goring's team participated in the 1997 Canadian Olympic Curling Trials, but finished with a 3–6 record.

=== 2007–current ===
Goring has qualified for the 2007, 2008, 2009 and 2011 Ontario Scotties Tournament of Hearts. At the 2007 Ontario Scotties Tournament of Hearts, Goring's team would finish round robin with a 7–2 record, however lost to Sherry Middaugh in the quarter final game. At the 2008 Ontario Scotties Tournament of Hearts, Goring and her team would finish with a 6–3 record, and advance to the semifinal, where she once again would lose to Sherry Middaugh. At the 2009 Ontario Scotties Tournament of Hearts, Goring would finish round robin play with a 5–4 record, winning two tiebreakers, the 3 vs. 4 game and the semifinal. Her team's winning streak would come to an end in the final, where she lost to Krista McCarville. Goring's team would not qualify for the provincials in 2010, however she would qualify out of the A side in Regionals advancing to the 2011 Ontario Scotties Tournament of Hearts. Her team would not find success there, finishing round robin with a 2–7 record.
