= Carrie Delahunt =

Canadian curler

- Curler
- Born: July 11, 1981 (age 45); Sarnia, Ontario

Team
- Curling club: Blue Water CC, Owen Sound, ON

Curling career
- Member Association: Ontario
- Top CTRS ranking: 22nd (2006–07)

Carrie Delahunt (born July 11, 1981 as Carrie Lindner) is a Canadian curler from Bradford, Ontario.

Her Bradford, Ontario team of Trisha Bourgeois, Lindsay Osborne, Megan Balsdon won the Ontario junior women's championship in 2001. This qualified them for the 2001 Canadian Junior Curling Championships in St. Catharines, Ontario. Her Ontario team finished the round-robin with an 8-4 record. In the playoffs, the team lost to Prince Edward Island in the semifinals, a team skipped by Suzanne Gaudet. An attempt at qualifying for the 2002 provincial junior championships failed.

In 2006, Delahunt skipped her team from St. Catharines to the championship at the Shorty Jenkins Classic.

Delahunt joined the Julie Reddick rink in 2011 as her third. The team disbanded in 2014.
