= Jen Gates =

Canadian curler

- Curler
- Other names: Jenny Gates
- Born: Jennifer Gates; April 22, 1990 (age 36); Sudbury, Ontario

Team
- Curling club: Idylwylde G&CC, Sudbury, ON
- Skip: Jackie McCormick
- Third: Crystal Taylor
- Second: Jen Gates
- Lead: Amanda Gates

Curling career
- Member Association: Northern Ontario (2003–2011; 2018–present); Alberta (2012–2018)
- Hearts: 4 (2012, 2019, 2020, 2022)
- Top CTRS ranking: 5th (2017–18)
Medal record
Curling
Representing Northern Ontario
Scotties Tournament of Hearts
Silver medal – second place	2022 Thunder Bay

Jennifer Gates (born April 22, 1990) is a Canadian curler from Sudbury, Ontario. Gates is a two-time Canadian university champion and a two-time Northern Ontario provincial champion.

== Career ==
=== Bantam and junior curling ===
During her bantam and junior curling years, Gates played on Team Lilly (formerly Team Maloney) out of the Idylwylde Curling Club in Sudbury, Ontario. The team represented Northern Ontario at the 2004 Ontario Winter Games in London, Ontario. The team also represented Northern Ontario at the Canadian Junior Curling Championships in 2009, 2010, and 2011, where Gates played second. The team's best finish was in 2010 in Sorel-Tracy, Quebec, where they finished the round robin with a 9–3 record and went on to take a bronze medal.

=== University ===
In 2009, Gates played second for the Laurentian University team, skipped by Amanda Gates, and won a bronze medal at the CIS Canadian Curling Championship in Montreal, Quebec.

Gates played second for the Laurier Golden Hawks, winning two consecutive national university titles (2011 and 2012). The team's win in 2011 gave them the opportunity to represent Canada at the 2012 Karuizawa International Curling Championship in Karuizawa, Japan, which they won, defeating Switzerland's Team Tirinzoni in the final. In 2012, they represented Canada at the 2013 Winter Universiade in Trentino, Italy, where they finished with a 4–5 record and out of the playoffs.

=== Women's curling (2012–2018) ===
Gates, together with teammates Laura Crocker and Sarah Wilkes, moved to Edmonton and began training out of the Saville Community Sports Centre. With the addition of Rebecca Pattison, Team Crocker was formed. They had a successful 2012–2013 season, finishing eighth on the Canadian Team Ranking System (CTRS). Team Crocker's CTRS ranking gave them a spot at the 2013 Canadian Olympic Curling Pre-Trials in Kitchener, Ontario, where they finished with a 2–3 record and out of the playoffs. The team made player changes in both the 2013–14 and 2014–15 seasons, with Erin Carmody replacing Wilkes in 2013 and Chelsea Carey skipping in 2014, moving Crocker up to third and bringing in Taylor McDonald at second, replacing Pattison. In the 2015–16 season, Kelsey Rocque replaced Carey as the team's skip. On the World Curling Tour, Team Rocque won the Red Deer Classic, defeating Switzerland's Alina Pätz in the final, and defeated Switzerland's Silvana Tirinzoni to win the CCT Uiseong Masters in Korea. On the Grand Slam tour, Team Rocque qualified for play-offs at the 2015 GSOC Tour Challenge Tier 1, the 2015 National, the 2016 Players' Championship, and the 2016 Humpty's Champions Cup. They participated in the 2015 Meridian Canadian Open but failed to qualify. The team's performance in the previous season qualified them for a spot at the 2015 Canada Cup of Curling in Grande Prairie, Alberta, where they finished with a 2–4 record.

During the 2016–17 curling season, the team lost in the quarterfinals of the 2016 GSOC Tour Challenge and failed to qualify for the playoffs at the 2016 WFG Masters, the 2016 Boost National and the 2017 Meridian Canadian Open. At the 2016 Canada Cup of Curling, they went 2–4 again. The team qualified for the 2017 Canadian Olympic Curling Pre-Trials, making it to the B semi-final, where they lost to Krista McCarville. On the Grand Slam tour in 2017–18, the team missed the playoffs at the 2017 Boost National, but followed up by making it to the quarterfinals of the 2018 Meridian Canadian Open. With Crocker as skip, the team missed the playoffs at the 2018 Players' Championship.

=== Women's curling (2018–present) ===
In 2018, Gates moved back to Sudbury and joined the Krista McCarville rink at second. The team won the 2019 Northern Ontario Scotties Tournament of Hearts and represented Northern Ontario at the 2019 Scotties Tournament of Hearts, where they placed fourth, losing to Rachel Homan in the 3 vs. 4 page playoff game. Gates was on the First All-Star team for being the best second during the round robin portion of the tournament, curling an 83% average. The team once again the Northern Ontario championship the following year at the 2020 Northern Ontario Scotties Tournament of Hearts, going undefeated in round robin play and beating Camille Daly, Laura Johnston, Krysta Burns, Amanda Gebhardt, Bella Croisier, and Abby Deschene, before beating Krysta Burns again in the final, which qualified them for the 2020 Scotties Tournament of Hearts in Moose Jaw, Saskatchewan. Team McCarville once again lost the 3 vs. 4 game to Ontario and Homan for the second year in a row.

Team McCarville was selected to represent Northern Ontario at the 2022 Scotties Tournament of Hearts and Gates joined them once again as their alternate. At the championship, the team went 5–3 through the round robin, enough to qualify for the playoffs. The team then won both of their seeding round games and defeated New Brunswick's Andrea Crawford in the 1 vs. 2 page playoff game to qualify for the final where they faced the Einarson rink. There, they could not keep their momentum going, losing the Scotties final 9–6.

== Personal life ==
Gates graduated from Medical Spa Advanced Therapist program at Redwood Beauty College and owns her own business Phases located in Sudbury Ontario. Her sister is Amanda Gates.
