= Kari Lavoie =

Canadian curler

- Curler
- Born: December 25, 1977 (age 48); Thunder Bay, Ontario

Team
- Curling club: Fort William CC, Thunder Bay, ON

Curling career
- Member Association: Northern Ontario
- Hearts: 2 (2009, 2010)
- Top CTRS ranking: 7th (2009-10)
Medal record
Curling
Canadian Olympic Curling Trials
Bronze medal – third place	2009 Edmonton
Scotties Tournament of Hearts
Bronze medal – third place	2010 Sault Ste. Marie

Kari Lavoie (born Kari MacLean on December 25, 1977 in Thunder Bay, Ontario) is a Canadian curler.

Lavoie joined the team in 2007 replacing Tiffany Stubbings. Her resume until that point included winning three Northern Ontario Junior championships in 1996, 1997, and 1998 and the 2006 Northern Ontario Mixed championship. She played lead for Mike Assad, a team that finished with a 3-8 record at the 2007 Canadian Mixed Curling Championship and won the most Sportsmanlike Player award.

Lavoie won her first Ontario provincial women's title in 2009, when the McCarville rink won the 2009 Ontario Scotties Tournament of Hearts. Lavoie played in the 2009 Canadian Olympic Curling Trials in Edmonton, Alberta placing third and winning bronze. She also repeated as Ontario Scotties Tournament of Hearts champion after going undefeated in Thunder Bay, Ontario at the Scotties Tournament of Hearts she finished 3rd and winning bronze in Sault Ste. Marie, Ontario.

In March 2011, she married Dan Lavoie in Mexico.

As of November 2011 Lavoie, has left her position as second, moving to fifth, as she is expecting her first child. Sarah Lang moved to the second position, while Liz Kingston was brought in at lead. She left the team in 2014.

== Sources ==
- CBC Sports. Grandslam Masters of Curling: Teams
- The Windsor Star. Ontario steals win to open Scotties. February 21, 2009
