= Tara George =

Canadian curler

Medal record

Curling

Canadian Olympic Curling Trials
Bronze medal – third place	2009 Edmonton	

Scotties Tournament of Hearts
Bronze medal – third place	2010 Sault Ste. Marie	

Tara George (née Coulterman; born September 15, 1973, in Sault Ste. Marie, Ontario) is a Canadian curler from Thunder Bay. She formerly played third for the Krista McCarville rink.

George joined up with McCarville in 2005, when she added McCarville to her team that she skipped that included Lorraine Lang and Tiffany Stubbings.

George has won four Ontario provincial titles as a member of the McCarville rink. George took the 2010-11 season off to have a baby and was replaced by Ashley Miharija.

George's son Carter is an ice hockey goaltender, and played for Canada at the 2025 World Junior Ice Hockey Championships.
