= 2024 Ontario Scotties Tournament of Hearts =

Canadian provincial women's curling championship

- Host city: Dorchester, Ontario
- Arena: FlightExec Centre
- Dates: January 22–26
- Winner: Team Inglis
- Curling club: Ottawa Hunt & GC, Ottawa
- Skip: Danielle Inglis
- Third: Kira Brunton
- Second: Calissa Daly
- Lead: Cassandra de Groot
- Alternate: Kim Tuck
- Coach: Steve Acorn
- Finalist: Carly Howard

The 2024 Ontario Scotties Tournament of Hearts, the provincial women's curling championship for Southern Ontario, was held from January 22 to 26 at FlightExec Centre in Dorchester, Ontario. The winning Danielle Inglis represented "Ontario–Inglis" at the 2024 Scotties Tournament of Hearts, Canada's national women's curling championship in Calgary, Alberta. The event was held in conjunction with the 2024 Ontario Tankard, the provincial men's curling championship. Both events are held together in non-Olympic years.

== Qualification process ==
Twelve teams qualified for the 2024 Ontario Scotties. The top four southern Ontario teams on the Canada Team Ranking System as of December 18, 2023 qualified, as well as the next four teams based on points accumulated in Ontario only events (Stu Sells Oakville Tankard, KW Fall Classic, AMJ Campbell Shorty Jenkins Classic, Stu Sells Tankard, Players Open, Stroud Sleeman Cash Spiel, North Grenville Women's Fall Curling Classic, Stu Sells Brantford Nissan Classic). The remaining four teams qualified from an open qualifier.

The number one team in Ontario, Team Rachel Homan, pre-qualified for the 2024 Scotties Tournament of Hearts, following changes to the qualification process made by Curling Canada, and therefore did not compete in the playdown process. At the Hearts, Homan's team was called "Ontario–Homan" to differentiate themselves from Inglis.

Teams Susan Froud, Heather Heggestad and Katelyn Wasylkiw opted not to compete.

| Qualification method | Berths | Qualifying team(s) |
|---|---|---|
| CTRS Overall | 4 | Danielle Inglis; Hailey Armstrong; Hollie Duncan; Isabelle Ladouceur |
| CTRS Ontario only | 4 | Chelsea Brandwood; Courtney Auld; Carly Howard; Kaitlin Jewer |
| Open Qualifier | 4 | Sierra Sutherland; Emma Artichuk; Amanda Gebhardt; Julia Markle |

== Teams ==
The teams are listed as follows:

| Skip | Third | Second | Lead | Alternate | Coach | Club |
|---|---|---|---|---|---|---|
| Hailey Armstrong | Jessica Humphries | Michaela Robert | Terri Weeks | Grace Cave | Steve Robert | Niagara Falls CC, Niagara Falls |
| Emma Artichuk | Lauren Rajala | Kailee Delany | Tori Zemmelink | Jamie Smith | Sean Turriff | Guelph CC, Guelph |
| Courtney Auld | Chrissy Cadorin | Cayla Auld | Melanie Ebach | Leigh Armstrong | | The Thornhill Club, Thornhill |
| Chelsea Brandwood | Megan Smith | Brenda Chapman | Keira McLaughlin | | John Gabel | Niagara Falls CC, Niagara Falls |
| Hollie Duncan | Megan Balsdon | Rachelle Strybosch | Tess Guyatt | Julie Tippin | Sherry Middaugh | Woodstock CC, Woodstock |
| Amanda Gebhardt | Allison Singh | Erin Cook | Hilary Huddleston | Michelle Butler | Dennis Nuhn | Listowel CC, Listowel |
| Carly Howard | Allison Flaxey | Lynn Kreviazuk | Laura Hickey | | | High Park Club, Toronto |
| Danielle Inglis | Kira Brunton | Calissa Daly | Cassandra de Groot | Kim Tuck | Steve Acorn | Ottawa H&GC, Ottawa |
| Breanna Rozon (Fourth) | Kristina Brauch | Kaitlin Jewer (Skip) | Audrey de Sousa | Jillian Page | Russ Duhaime | Lakefield CC, Lakefield |
| Isabelle Ladouceur | Lori Eddy | Grace Lloyd | Rachel Steele | | Maurice Wilson | Whitby CC, Whitby |
| Julia Markle | Evelyn Robert | Scotia Maltman | Sadie McCutcheon | | Jodi McCutcheon | London CC, London |
| Sierra Sutherland | Jenny Madden | Chelsea Ferrier | Julie Breton | Rebecca Perry | Paul Madden | Rideau CC, Ottawa |

=== Map of teams ===
Ontario Scotties Teams

== Knockout brackets ==
=== A Event ===
First Knockout | Qualifier 1
Danielle Inglis | 9
Kaitlin Jewer | 7 | Emma Artichuk | 7
Emma Artichuk | 8 | Danielle Inglis | 6
Chelsea Brandwood | 5
Isabelle Ladouceur | 2
Amanda Gebhardt | 4 | Chelsea Brandwood | 8
Chelsea Brandwood | 10 | Danielle Inglis | 10
Carly Howard | 4
Hollie Duncan | 6
Sierra Sutherland | 4 | Courtney Auld | 4
Courtney Auld | 9 | Hollie Duncan | 6
Carly Howard | 7
Hailey Armstrong | 7
Julia Markle | 7 | Carly Howard | 9
Carly Howard | 9

=== B Event ===
Second Knockout | Qualifier 2
Kaitlin Jewer | 3
Isabelle Ladouceur | 6 | Isabelle Ladouceur | 7
Hollie Duncan | 9
Hollie Duncan | 8
Julia Markle | 6 | Chelsea Brandwood | 0
Courtney Auld | 9 | Courtney Auld | 8
Chelsea Brandwood | 9
Hollie Duncan | 3
Sierra Sutherland | 2 | Carly Howard | 8
Hailey Armstrong | 10 | Hailey Armstrong | 7
Amanda Gebhardt | 3 | Emma Artichuk | 4
Emma Artichuk | 10 | Hailey Armstrong | 4
Carly Howard | 5

=== C Event ===
| Third Knockout | | | | Qualifier 3 |
| | | Hailey Armstrong | 6 |
| Kaitlin Jewer | 6 | Julia Markle | 5 |
| Julia Markle | 9 | | | Hailey Armstrong | 5 |
| | | | | Chelsea Brandwood | 7 |
| | | Emma Artichuk | 6 |
| | | Chelsea Brandwood | 7 |

| Third Knockout | | | | Qualifier 4 |
| Sierra Sutherland | 9 |
| Isabelle Ladouceur | 13 | Isabelle Ladouceur | 6 |
| Amanda Gebhardt | 9 | Amanda Gebhardt | 4 |
| Courtney Auld | 2 | | | Isabelle Ladouceur | 8 |
| | | | | Hollie Duncan | 7 |

== Knockout results ==
All draws are listed in Eastern Time (UTC−05:00).

=== Draw 1 ===
Monday, January 22, 2:30 pm

| Sheet A | 1 | 2 | 3 | 4 | 5 | 6 | 7 | 8 | 9 | 10 | 11 | Final |
|---|---|---|---|---|---|---|---|---|---|---|---|---|
| Kaitlin Jewer | 0 | 0 | 1 | 0 | 1 | 0 | 2 | 0 | 1 | 2 | 0 | 7 |
| Emma Artichuk 🔨 | 1 | 1 | 0 | 1 | 0 | 2 | 0 | 2 | 0 | 0 | 1 | 8 |

| Sheet B | 1 | 2 | 3 | 4 | 5 | 6 | 7 | 8 | 9 | 10 | Final |
|---|---|---|---|---|---|---|---|---|---|---|---|
| Amanda Gebhardt | 0 | 1 | 0 | 2 | 0 | 0 | 1 | 0 | X | X | 4 |
| Chelsea Brandwood 🔨 | 1 | 0 | 1 | 0 | 1 | 1 | 0 | 6 | X | X | 10 |

| Sheet C | 1 | 2 | 3 | 4 | 5 | 6 | 7 | 8 | 9 | 10 | Final |
|---|---|---|---|---|---|---|---|---|---|---|---|
| Sierra Sutherland 🔨 | 0 | 1 | 0 | 1 | 1 | 0 | 0 | 1 | 0 | X | 4 |
| Courtney Auld | 0 | 0 | 3 | 0 | 0 | 2 | 1 | 0 | 3 | X | 9 |

| Sheet D | 1 | 2 | 3 | 4 | 5 | 6 | 7 | 8 | 9 | 10 | Final |
|---|---|---|---|---|---|---|---|---|---|---|---|
| Julia Markle | 0 | 1 | 0 | 3 | 1 | 0 | 0 | 1 | 1 | X | 7 |
| Carly Howard 🔨 | 2 | 0 | 2 | 0 | 0 | 1 | 4 | 0 | 0 | X | 9 |

=== Draw 2 ===
Monday, January 22, 7:30 pm

| Sheet B | 1 | 2 | 3 | 4 | 5 | 6 | 7 | 8 | 9 | 10 | Final |
|---|---|---|---|---|---|---|---|---|---|---|---|
| Hailey Armstrong 🔨 | 0 | 0 | 0 | 4 | 1 | 0 | 2 | 0 | 0 | 0 | 7 |
| Carly Howard | 1 | 2 | 2 | 0 | 0 | 1 | 0 | 1 | 1 | 1 | 9 |

| Sheet C | 1 | 2 | 3 | 4 | 5 | 6 | 7 | 8 | 9 | 10 | Final |
|---|---|---|---|---|---|---|---|---|---|---|---|
| Danielle Inglis | 0 | 1 | 0 | 0 | 1 | 0 | 1 | 0 | 2 | 4 | 9 |
| Emma Artichuk 🔨 | 1 | 0 | 1 | 1 | 0 | 3 | 0 | 1 | 0 | 0 | 7 |

| Sheet D | 1 | 2 | 3 | 4 | 5 | 6 | 7 | 8 | 9 | 10 | Final |
|---|---|---|---|---|---|---|---|---|---|---|---|
| Isabelle Ladouceur | 0 | 1 | 0 | 0 | 0 | 1 | 0 | 0 | X | X | 2 |
| Chelsea Brandwood 🔨 | 2 | 0 | 2 | 1 | 1 | 0 | 1 | 1 | X | X | 8 |

| Sheet E | 1 | 2 | 3 | 4 | 5 | 6 | 7 | 8 | 9 | 10 | Final |
|---|---|---|---|---|---|---|---|---|---|---|---|
| Hollie Duncan | 0 | 0 | 0 | 0 | 2 | 1 | 1 | 0 | 1 | 1 | 6 |
| Courtney Auld 🔨 | 0 | 1 | 0 | 1 | 0 | 0 | 0 | 2 | 0 | 0 | 4 |

=== Draw 3 ===
Tuesday, January 23, 9:30 am

| Sheet A | 1 | 2 | 3 | 4 | 5 | 6 | 7 | 8 | 9 | 10 | Final |
|---|---|---|---|---|---|---|---|---|---|---|---|
| Sierra Sutherland | 0 | 0 | 0 | 0 | 1 | 1 | 0 | X | X | X | 2 |
| Hailey Armstrong 🔨 | 0 | 0 | 4 | 1 | 0 | 0 | 5 | X | X | X | 10 |

| Sheet B | 1 | 2 | 3 | 4 | 5 | 6 | 7 | 8 | 9 | 10 | Final |
|---|---|---|---|---|---|---|---|---|---|---|---|
| Julia Markle 🔨 | 1 | 0 | 0 | 2 | 0 | 2 | 0 | 0 | 1 | 0 | 6 |
| Courtney Auld | 0 | 1 | 2 | 0 | 1 | 0 | 1 | 2 | 0 | 2 | 9 |

| Sheet C | 1 | 2 | 3 | 4 | 5 | 6 | 7 | 8 | 9 | 10 | Final |
|---|---|---|---|---|---|---|---|---|---|---|---|
| Kaitlin Jewer | 0 | 1 | 0 | 1 | 0 | 0 | 0 | 1 | 0 | X | 3 |
| Isabelle Ladouceur 🔨 | 0 | 0 | 1 | 0 | 2 | 1 | 1 | 0 | 1 | X | 6 |

| Sheet D | 1 | 2 | 3 | 4 | 5 | 6 | 7 | 8 | 9 | 10 | Final |
|---|---|---|---|---|---|---|---|---|---|---|---|
| Amanda Gebhardt | 1 | 0 | 0 | 0 | 2 | 0 | 0 | X | X | X | 3 |
| Emma Artichuk 🔨 | 0 | 1 | 1 | 3 | 0 | 3 | 2 | X | X | X | 10 |

=== Draw 4 ===
Tuesday, January 23, 2:30 pm

| Sheet B | 1 | 2 | 3 | 4 | 5 | 6 | 7 | 8 | 9 | 10 | Final |
|---|---|---|---|---|---|---|---|---|---|---|---|
| Danielle Inglis 🔨 | 2 | 0 | 0 | 0 | 0 | 0 | 1 | 2 | 0 | 1 | 6 |
| Chelsea Brandwood | 0 | 1 | 1 | 0 | 0 | 1 | 0 | 0 | 2 | 0 | 5 |

| Sheet C | 1 | 2 | 3 | 4 | 5 | 6 | 7 | 8 | 9 | 10 | Final |
|---|---|---|---|---|---|---|---|---|---|---|---|
| Hollie Duncan | 0 | 1 | 0 | 2 | 1 | 0 | 2 | 0 | 0 | 0 | 6 |
| Carly Howard 🔨 | 2 | 0 | 1 | 0 | 0 | 1 | 0 | 2 | 0 | 1 | 7 |

| Sheet E | 1 | 2 | 3 | 4 | 5 | 6 | 7 | 8 | 9 | 10 | Final |
|---|---|---|---|---|---|---|---|---|---|---|---|
| Kaitlin Jewer 🔨 | 0 | 1 | 0 | 0 | 1 | 0 | 2 | 2 | 0 | X | 6 |
| Julia Markle | 1 | 0 | 2 | 2 | 0 | 3 | 0 | 0 | 1 | X | 9 |

=== Draw 5 ===
Tuesday, January 23, 7:30 pm

| Sheet B | 1 | 2 | 3 | 4 | 5 | 6 | 7 | 8 | 9 | 10 | Final |
|---|---|---|---|---|---|---|---|---|---|---|---|
| Isabelle Ladouceur | 0 | 2 | 0 | 3 | 0 | 2 | 0 | 0 | 0 | 0 | 7 |
| Hollie Duncan 🔨 | 2 | 0 | 1 | 0 | 2 | 0 | 2 | 0 | 1 | 1 | 9 |

| Sheet C | 1 | 2 | 3 | 4 | 5 | 6 | 7 | 8 | 9 | 10 | Final |
|---|---|---|---|---|---|---|---|---|---|---|---|
| Hailey Armstrong | 2 | 0 | 0 | 0 | 0 | 2 | 0 | 1 | 0 | 2 | 7 |
| Emma Artichuk 🔨 | 0 | 0 | 0 | 1 | 0 | 0 | 2 | 0 | 1 | 0 | 4 |

| Sheet D | 1 | 2 | 3 | 4 | 5 | 6 | 7 | 8 | 9 | 10 | Final |
|---|---|---|---|---|---|---|---|---|---|---|---|
| Danielle Inglis | 0 | 2 | 0 | 6 | 0 | 2 | X | X | X | X | 10 |
| Carly Howard 🔨 | 1 | 0 | 1 | 0 | 2 | 0 | X | X | X | X | 4 |

| Sheet E | 1 | 2 | 3 | 4 | 5 | 6 | 7 | 8 | 9 | 10 | 11 | Final |
|---|---|---|---|---|---|---|---|---|---|---|---|---|
| Courtney Auld 🔨 | 0 | 2 | 0 | 2 | 1 | 0 | 0 | 2 | 0 | 1 | 0 | 8 |
| Chelsea Brandwood | 0 | 0 | 3 | 0 | 0 | 3 | 0 | 0 | 2 | 0 | 1 | 9 |

=== Draw 6 ===
Wednesday, January 24, 2:30 pm

| Sheet B | 1 | 2 | 3 | 4 | 5 | 6 | 7 | 8 | 9 | 10 | Final |
|---|---|---|---|---|---|---|---|---|---|---|---|
| Amanda Gebhardt 🔨 | 1 | 3 | 3 | 0 | 2 | 0 | X | X | X | X | 9 |
| Courtney Auld | 0 | 0 | 0 | 1 | 0 | 1 | X | X | X | X | 2 |

| Sheet C | 1 | 2 | 3 | 4 | 5 | 6 | 7 | 8 | 9 | 10 | Final |
|---|---|---|---|---|---|---|---|---|---|---|---|
| Hollie Duncan 🔨 | 0 | 1 | 1 | 1 | 2 | 0 | 2 | 1 | X | X | 8 |
| Chelsea Brandwood | 0 | 0 | 0 | 0 | 0 | 0 | 0 | 0 | X | X | 0 |

| Sheet D | 1 | 2 | 3 | 4 | 5 | 6 | 7 | 8 | 9 | 10 | Final |
|---|---|---|---|---|---|---|---|---|---|---|---|
| Hailey Armstrong | 0 | 0 | 1 | 0 | 0 | 0 | 1 | 0 | 2 | 0 | 4 |
| Carly Howard 🔨 | 1 | 1 | 0 | 0 | 0 | 1 | 0 | 1 | 0 | 1 | 5 |

| Sheet E | 1 | 2 | 3 | 4 | 5 | 6 | 7 | 8 | 9 | 10 | 11 | Final |
|---|---|---|---|---|---|---|---|---|---|---|---|---|
| Sierra Sutherland 🔨 | 0 | 1 | 0 | 3 | 1 | 1 | 2 | 0 | 0 | 1 | 0 | 9 |
| Isabelle Ladouceur | 1 | 0 | 1 | 0 | 0 | 0 | 0 | 5 | 2 | 0 | 4 | 13 |

=== Draw 7 ===
Wednesday, January 24, 7:30 pm

| Sheet E | 1 | 2 | 3 | 4 | 5 | 6 | 7 | 8 | 9 | 10 | Final |
|---|---|---|---|---|---|---|---|---|---|---|---|
| Hollie Duncan | 0 | 0 | 0 | 0 | 0 | 1 | 1 | 1 | 0 | X | 3 |
| Carly Howard 🔨 | 0 | 2 | 2 | 1 | 1 | 0 | 0 | 0 | 2 | X | 8 |

=== Draw 8 ===
Thursday, January 25, 9:30 am

| Sheet A | 1 | 2 | 3 | 4 | 5 | 6 | 7 | 8 | 9 | 10 | 11 | Final |
|---|---|---|---|---|---|---|---|---|---|---|---|---|
| Emma Artichuk | 0 | 0 | 1 | 0 | 0 | 1 | 0 | 0 | 3 | 1 | 0 | 6 |
| Chelsea Brandwood 🔨 | 2 | 1 | 0 | 0 | 1 | 0 | 1 | 1 | 0 | 0 | 1 | 7 |

| Sheet B | 1 | 2 | 3 | 4 | 5 | 6 | 7 | 8 | 9 | 10 | Final |
|---|---|---|---|---|---|---|---|---|---|---|---|
| Hailey Armstrong 🔨 | 1 | 0 | 2 | 0 | 0 | 2 | 0 | 1 | 0 | 0 | 6 |
| Julia Markle | 0 | 2 | 0 | 1 | 0 | 0 | 1 | 0 | 0 | 1 | 5 |

| Sheet E | 1 | 2 | 3 | 4 | 5 | 6 | 7 | 8 | 9 | 10 | Final |
|---|---|---|---|---|---|---|---|---|---|---|---|
| Isabelle Ladouceur | 1 | 0 | 0 | 0 | 0 | 3 | 0 | 1 | 0 | 1 | 6 |
| Amanda Gebhardt 🔨 | 0 | 1 | 1 | 0 | 1 | 0 | 1 | 0 | 0 | 0 | 4 |

=== Draw 9 ===
Thursday, January 25, 2:30 pm

| Sheet A | 1 | 2 | 3 | 4 | 5 | 6 | 7 | 8 | 9 | 10 | Final |
|---|---|---|---|---|---|---|---|---|---|---|---|
| Isabelle Ladouceur 🔨 | 2 | 1 | 0 | 0 | 1 | 2 | 0 | 2 | 0 | 0 | 8 |
| Hollie Duncan | 0 | 0 | 1 | 1 | 0 | 0 | 1 | 0 | 3 | 1 | 7 |

| Sheet D | 1 | 2 | 3 | 4 | 5 | 6 | 7 | 8 | 9 | 10 | Final |
|---|---|---|---|---|---|---|---|---|---|---|---|
| Hailey Armstrong | 0 | 1 | 0 | 2 | 0 | 0 | 0 | 2 | 0 | X | 5 |
| Chelsea Brandwood 🔨 | 2 | 0 | 1 | 0 | 2 | 0 | 1 | 0 | 1 | X | 7 |

== Playoffs ==
Page playoff system
A | Danielle Inglis | 3
B | Carly Howard | 8
C1 | Chelsea Brandwood | 7
C2 | Isabelle Ladouceur | 6

Semifinal
A | Danielle Inglis | 10
C1 | Chelsea Brandwood | 4

Final
B | Carly Howard | 7
A | Danielle Inglis | 8

=== A vs. B ===
Thursday, January 25, 2:30 pm

| Sheet C | 1 | 2 | 3 | 4 | 5 | 6 | 7 | 8 | 9 | 10 | Final |
|---|---|---|---|---|---|---|---|---|---|---|---|
| Danielle Inglis 🔨 | 0 | 1 | 0 | 0 | 1 | 0 | 1 | 0 | X | X | 3 |
| Carly Howard | 2 | 0 | 1 | 1 | 0 | 2 | 0 | 2 | X | X | 8 |

=== C1 vs. C2 ===
Thursday, January 25, 7:30 pm

| Sheet E | 1 | 2 | 3 | 4 | 5 | 6 | 7 | 8 | 9 | 10 | Final |
|---|---|---|---|---|---|---|---|---|---|---|---|
| Chelsea Brandwood | 0 | 1 | 0 | 2 | 0 | 2 | 0 | 0 | 0 | 2 | 7 |
| Isabelle Ladouceur 🔨 | 0 | 0 | 2 | 0 | 2 | 0 | 0 | 0 | 2 | 0 | 6 |

=== Semifinal ===
Friday, January 26, 12:15 pm

| Sheet C | 1 | 2 | 3 | 4 | 5 | 6 | 7 | 8 | 9 | 10 | Final |
|---|---|---|---|---|---|---|---|---|---|---|---|
| Danielle Inglis 🔨 | 0 | 2 | 0 | 1 | 1 | 3 | 0 | 3 | X | X | 10 |
| Chelsea Brandwood | 0 | 0 | 3 | 0 | 0 | 0 | 1 | 0 | X | X | 4 |

=== Final ===
Friday, January 26, 8:30 pm

| Sheet C | 1 | 2 | 3 | 4 | 5 | 6 | 7 | 8 | 9 | 10 | Final |
|---|---|---|---|---|---|---|---|---|---|---|---|
| Carly Howard 🔨 | 1 | 0 | 0 | 1 | 0 | 0 | 3 | 0 | 1 | 1 | 7 |
| Danielle Inglis | 0 | 2 | 0 | 0 | 0 | 4 | 0 | 2 | 0 | 0 | 8 |

2024 Ontario Scotties Tournament of Hearts

Danielle Inglis
1st Ontario Provincial Championship title

== Qualification ==
=== Open Qualifier ===
January 5–7, Oakville Curling Club, Oakville

A1 Side | To STOH
Shelley Hardy (Sarnia) | 1
Amanda Gebhardt (Listowel) | 8 | Amanda Gebhardt (Listowel) | 9
Quinn Walsh (Oshawa) | 1 | Amanda Gebhardt (Listowel) | 1
Mackenzie Kiemele (Leaside) | 7 | Emma Artichuk (Guelph) | 6
Emilie Metcalfe (Peterborough) | 6 | Mackenzie Kiemele (Leaside) | 3
Charlotte Johnston (Barrie) | 4 | Emma Artichuk (Guelph) | 6
Emma Artichuk (Guelph) | 9

A2 Side | To STOH
Paige Brown (Navan) | 5
Katelin Langford (Peterborough) | 4 | Paige Brown (Navan) | 5
Sierra Sutherland (Rideau) | 8 | Sierra Sutherland (Rideau) | 6
Caitlin Keon (York) | 1 | Sierra Sutherland (Rideau) | 6
Marteen Jones (Acton) | 8 | Julia Markle (London) | 4
Julia Markle (London) | 9 | Sarah Bailey (Niagara Falls) | 3
Julia Markle (London) | 5

B1 Side | To STOH
Julia Markle (London) | 8
Shelley Hardy (Sarnia) | 6
Shelley Hardy (Sarnia) | 6
Katelin Langford (Peterborough) | 7 | Katelin Langford (Peterborough) | 2
Caitlin Keon (Richmond Hill) | 6 | Shelley Hardy (Sarnia) | 6
Mackenzie Kiemele (Leaside) | 2
Marteen Jones (Acton) | 2
Mackenzie Kiemele (Leaside) | 3

B2 Side | To STOH
Amanda Gebhardt (Listowel) | 4
Sarah Bailey (Niagara Falls) | 2
Quinn Walsh (Oshawa) | 3
Paige Brown (Navan) | 8
Paige Brown (Navan) | 6
Emilie Metcalfe (Peterborough) | 5 | Sarah Bailey (Niagara Falls) | 7
Charlotte Johnston (Barrie) | 7 | Charlotte Johnston (Barrie) | 3
Sarah Bailey (Niagara Falls) | 6
