= 2023 Ontario Scotties Tournament of Hearts =

Canadian provincial women's curling championship

- Host city: Port Elgin, Ontario
- Arena: The Plex
- Dates: January 23–29
- Winner: Team Homan
- Curling club: Ottawa CC, Ottawa
- Skip: Tracy Fleury
- Fourth: Rachel Homan
- Second: Emma Miskew
- Lead: Sarah Wilkes
- Coach: Ryan Fry
- Finalist: Hollie Duncan

The 2023 Ontario Scotties Tournament of Hearts, the provincial women's curling championship for Southern Ontario, was held from January 23 to 29 at The Plex in Port Elgin, Ontario. The winning Rachel Homan rink represented Ontario at the 2023 Scotties Tournament of Hearts, Canada's national women's curling championship in Kamloops, British Columbia where they made the Championship round losing to Nova Scotia 7–6 in an extra end.

The event was held in conjunction with the 2023 Ontario Tankard, the provincial men's curling championship. Both events are held together in non-Olympic years.

== Qualification process ==
Twelve teams qualified for the 2023 Ontario Scotties. As defending champions, Team Rachel Homan earned the first qualification spot (due to COVID-19 the 2022 Ontario Hearts were postponed until after the national Tournament of Hearts). One team qualified via their results in the "Grand Slam" series events (2022 PointsBet Invitational, 2022 National, 2022 Tour Challenge, 2022 Masters). Two teams qualified via their results in the Trillium Tour '1000' series events (Stu Sells Toronto Tankard, Stroud Sleeman Cash Spiel, North Grenville Curling Club Women's Fall Classic, Stu Sells Brantford Nissan Classic). Three teams qualified via their results in the Trillium Tour '500' series events (Gord Carroll Curling Classic, KW Fall Classic, CurlON Women's Open, Home Again Women's Classic, plus the aforementioned 1000 events). One team (restricted to curlers under the age of 25) qualified via their results in the aforementioned Trillium Tour events, plus the CurlON 250 Event #1. The remaining four teams qualified via an open qualifier.

Qualification method	Berths	Qualifying team(s)
Defending Champion	1	Rachel Homan
Top Grand Slam series teams	1	Hollie Duncan
Trillium Tour '1,000' Series	2	Isabelle Ladouceur; Danielle Inglis
Trillium Tour '500' Series	3	Lauren Mann; Carly Howard; Hailey Armstrong
Trillium Tour '250' Series (Under-25)	1	Maddy Warriner
Open Qualifier	4	Susan Froud; Chelsea Brandwood; Katelyn Wasylkiw; Allison Flaxey

== Teams ==
The teams are listed as follows:

Skip	Third	Second	Lead	Alternate	Club
Hailey Armstrong	Megan Smith	Jessica Humphries	Terri Weeks	Emma Artichuck	KW Granite Club, Waterloo
Chelsea Brandwood	Brenda Holloway	Riley Sandham	Hilary Nuhn		Listowel CC, Listowel
Hollie Duncan	Megan Balsdon	Rachelle Strybosch	Tess Bobbie	Sherry Middaugh	Woodstock CC, Woodstock
Susan Froud	Kaitlin Jewer	Kristina Brauch	Audrey Wallbank		Alliston CC, Alliston
Allison Flaxey (Note: Calissa Daly replaced Jacqueline Harrison due to Harrison dealing with a hip injury.)	Calissa Daly	Lynn Kreviazuk	Laura Hickey		Dundas Valley G&CC, Dundas
Rachel Homan (Fourth)	Tracy Fleury (Skip)	Emma Miskew	Sarah Wilkes		Ottawa CC, Ottawa
Carly Howard	Stephanie Matheson	Grace Holyoke	Jestyn Murphy		Mississaugua G&CC, Mississauga
Danielle Inglis	Kira Brunton	Cheryl Kreviazuk	Cassandra de Groot		Ottawa H&GC, Ottawa
Isabelle Ladouceur	Jamie Smith	Grace Lloyd	Rachel Steele	Grace Cave	Dundas Valley G&CC, Dundas
Lauren Mann	Shelley Hardy	Stephanie Mumford	Stephanie Corrado	Marteen Jones	Arnprior CC, Arnprior
Maddy Warriner	Sarah Bailey	Madison Fisher	Shannon Warriner	Kaelyn Gregory	Dundas Valley G&CC, Dundas
Katelyn Wasylkiw	Lauren Wasylkiw	Stephanie Thompson	Erin Way		Whitby CC, Whitby

=== Map of teams ===
Ontario Scotties Teams

== Round-robin standings ==
Final round-robin standings

Key
Teams to Championship Round
Teams to Tiebreaker

Pool A
Skip (Club)	W	L	PF	PA	EW	EL	BE	SE
Team Homan (Ottawa)	4	1	39	23	19	15	2	4
Danielle Inglis (Ottawa Hunt)	4	1	39	29	23	19	3	7
Team Harrison (Dundas Valley)	4	1	33	27	21	17	0	7
Susan Froud (Alliston)	2	3	29	38	17	23	1	4
Lauren Mann (Arnprior)	1	4	28	39	20	22	2	3
Maddy Warriner (Dundas Valley) (Note: Team Warriner withdrew prior to Draw 8 due to two positive COVID-19 cases within their team. Their remaining two opponents (Team Homan and Team Harrison) each received forfeit wins.)	0	5	11	23	9	13	3	2

Pool B
Skip (Club)	W	L	PF	PA	EW	EL	BE	SE
Hollie Duncan (Woodstock)	4	1	44	25	25	18	1	6
Carly Howard (Mississaugua)	4	1	44	33	23	20	0	8
Hailey Armstrong (KW Granite)	2	3	24	37	18	21	0	5
Katelyn Wasylkiw (Whitby)	2	3	38	40	23	25	0	5
Isabelle Ladouceur (Dundas Valley)	2	3	36	37	21	24	1	7
Chelsea Brandwood (Listowel)	1	4	30	44	20	22	1	3

== Round-robin results ==
All draws are listed in Eastern Time (UTC−05:00).

=== Draw 1 ===
Monday, January 23, 7:30 pm

Sheet A	1	2	3	4	5	6	7	8	9	10	Final
Hollie Duncan 🔨	1	0	0	0	3	0	2	0	2	X	8
Katelyn Wasylkiw	0	1	1	1	0	1	0	1	0	X	5

Sheet B	1	2	3	4	5	6	7	8	9	10	Final
Isabelle Ladouceur	0	1	0	2	4	0	3	0	X	X	10
Chelsea Brandwood 🔨	1	0	1	0	0	2	0	1	X	X	5

Sheet C	1	2	3	4	5	6	7	8	9	10	Final
Team Homan 🔨	0	2	1	1	0	2	4	X	X	X	10
Susan Froud	0	0	0	0	1	0	0	X	X	X	1

Sheet D	1	2	3	4	5	6	7	8	9	10	Final
Lauren Mann 🔨	1	0	2	0	0	2	1	0	1	X	7
Maddy Warriner	0	2	0	1	0	0	0	1	0	X	4

Sheet E	1	2	3	4	5	6	7	8	9	10	Final
Carly Howard 🔨	3	2	0	0	0	4	2	X	X	X	11
Hailey Armstrong	0	0	1	1	1	0	0	X	X	X	3

=== Draw 2 ===
Tuesday, January 24, 9:30 am

Sheet E	1	2	3	4	5	6	7	8	9	10	Final
Danielle Inglis 🔨	0	0	0	2	0	2	1	1	0	1	7
Team Harrison	1	1	1	0	1	0	0	0	2	0	6

=== Draw 3 ===
Tuesday, January 24, 2:30 pm

Sheet C	1	2	3	4	5	6	7	8	9	10	Final
Isabelle Ladouceur	0	0	2	1	0	0	0	1	2	0	6
Carly Howard 🔨	2	0	0	0	1	1	2	0	0	1	7

Sheet D	1	2	3	4	5	6	7	8	9	10	Final
Katelyn Wasylkiw	0	3	0	1	0	0	0	1	0	1	6
Hailey Armstrong 🔨	2	0	1	0	1	2	2	0	1	0	9

Sheet E	1	2	3	4	5	6	7	8	9	10	Final
Hollie Duncan 🔨	2	0	2	1	0	2	1	0	1	X	9
Chelsea Brandwood	0	2	0	0	2	0	0	1	0	X	5

=== Draw 4 ===
Tuesday, January 24, 7:30 pm

Sheet A	1	2	3	4	5	6	7	8	9	10	Final
Maddy Warriner 🔨	0	0	2	0	1	1	0	1	0	0	5
Susan Froud	0	0	0	2	0	0	2	0	2	1	7

Sheet B	1	2	3	4	5	6	7	8	9	10	11	Final
Team Homan 🔨	0	2	0	2	0	1	0	1	0	2	0	8
Team Harrison	0	0	2	0	2	0	3	0	1	0	1	9

Sheet C	1	2	3	4	5	6	7	8	9	10	Final
Danielle Inglis 🔨	0	2	1	0	2	0	2	1	0	X	8
Lauren Mann	0	0	0	1	0	1	0	0	3	X	5

=== Draw 5 ===
Wednesday, January 25, 9:30 am

Sheet D	1	2	3	4	5	6	7	8	9	10	Final
Hollie Duncan 🔨	0	2	0	1	0	1	1	0	1	4	10
Carly Howard	0	0	1	0	2	0	0	1	0	0	4

=== Draw 6 ===
Wednesday, January 25, 2:30 pm

Sheet A	1	2	3	4	5	6	7	8	9	10	Final
Isabelle Ladouceur	0	1	0	0	1	0	1	0	X	X	3
Hailey Armstrong 🔨	2	0	2	1	0	1	0	2	X	X	8

Sheet B	1	2	3	4	5	6	7	8	9	10	Final
Danielle Inglis 🔨	0	2	3	0	3	0	1	X	X	X	9
Maddy Warriner	1	0	0	0	0	1	0	X	X	X	2

Sheet C	1	2	3	4	5	6	7	8	9	10	Final
Chelsea Brandwood	0	1	0	2	0	1	0	2	0	X	6
Katelyn Wasylkiw 🔨	3	0	2	0	1	0	2	0	2	X	10

Sheet D	1	2	3	4	5	6	7	8	9	10	Final
Team Harrison 🔨	1	1	0	2	0	0	2	0	3	2	11
Susan Froud	0	0	2	0	0	2	0	2	0	0	6

Sheet E	1	2	3	4	5	6	7	8	9	10	Final
Team Homan	0	2	0	4	0	2	0	2	X	X	10
Lauren Mann 🔨	1	0	1	0	1	0	1	0	X	X	4

=== Draw 8 ===
Thursday, January 26, 9:30 am

Sheet A	1	2	3	4	5	6	7	8	9	10	Final
Carly Howard 🔨	2	1	0	3	0	1	0	6	X	X	13
Chelsea Brandwood	0	0	1	0	3	0	2	0	X	X	6

Sheet B	1	2	3	4	5	6	7	8	9	10	Final
Hollie Duncan 🔨	4	0	1	1	0	3	X	X	X	X	9
Hailey Armstrong	0	1	0	0	1	0	X	X	X	X	2

Sheet C	Final
Team Homan 🔨	W
Maddy Warriner	L

Sheet E	1	2	3	4	5	6	7	8	9	10	Final
Isabelle Ladouceur	0	2	0	1	3	0	0	0	1	1	8
Katelyn Wasylkiw 🔨	5	0	1	0	0	1	1	1	0	0	9

=== Draw 9 ===
Thursday, January 26, 2:30 pm

Sheet A	1	2	3	4	5	6	7	8	9	10	Final
Lauren Mann	0	0	2	1	0	1	0	0	2	X	6
Team Harrison 🔨	1	2	0	0	1	0	2	1	0	X	7

Sheet B	1	2	3	4	5	6	7	8	9	10	Final
Danielle Inglis 🔨	0	1	0	0	0	2	0	0	2	1	6
Susan Froud	0	0	2	1	0	0	1	1	0	0	5

=== Draw 10 ===
Thursday, January 26, 7:30 pm

Sheet D	1	2	3	4	5	6	7	8	9	10	Final
Hollie Duncan 🔨	0	3	0	1	0	0	1	0	2	1	8
Isabelle Ladouceur	2	0	2	0	1	3	0	1	0	0	9

Sheet E	1	2	3	4	5	6	7	8	9	10	Final
Hailey Armstrong	0	0	0	0	1	0	1	0	0	X	2
Chelsea Brandwood 🔨	0	1	1	2	0	1	0	1	2	X	8

=== Draw 11 ===
Friday, January 27, 9:30 am

Sheet A	1	2	3	4	5	6	7	8	9	10	Final
Team Homan	0	2	2	0	2	0	2	0	3	0	11
Danielle Inglis 🔨	3	0	0	2	0	1	0	2	0	1	9

Sheet B	1	2	3	4	5	6	7	8	9	10	Final
Carly Howard 🔨	2	0	1	2	1	0	1	2	0	0	9
Katelyn Wasylkiw	0	3	0	0	0	3	0	0	1	1	8

Sheet C	1	2	3	4	5	6	7	8	9	10	Final
Lauren Mann	2	0	1	0	2	0	0	0	1	0	6
Susan Froud 🔨	0	1	0	3	0	2	0	3	0	1	10

Sheet D	Final
Maddy Warriner	L
Team Harrison 🔨	W

== Tiebreaker ==
Friday, January 27, 7:30 pm

Sheet B	1	2	3	4	5	6	7	8	9	10	Final
Danielle Inglis 🔨	0	2	0	2	2	0	2	X	X	X	8
Team Harrison	0	0	1	0	0	1	0	X	X	X	2

== Championship round ==
Records from Round Robin carry over to the Championship Round

Key
Teams to Playoffs
Teams to Tiebreaker

Skip	W	L
Team Homan	6	1
Danielle Inglis	6	1
Carly Howard	4	3
Hollie Duncan	4	3

== Championship round results ==
=== Draw 13 ===
Friday, January 27, 7:30 pm

Sheet A	1	2	3	4	5	6	7	8	9	10	11	Final
Team Homan 🔨	1	0	0	1	2	1	0	2	0	0	1	8
Hollie Duncan	0	1	2	0	0	0	3	0	0	1	0	7

=== Draw 14 ===
Saturday, January 28, 9:30 am

Sheet B	1	2	3	4	5	6	7	8	9	10	Final
Danielle Inglis 🔨	1	0	1	0	2	0	3	0	1	X	8
Carly Howard	0	2	0	1	0	1	0	3	0	X	7

=== Draw 15 ===
Saturday, January 28, 2:30 pm

Team	1	2	3	4	5	6	7	8	9	10	Final
Team Homan 🔨	0	3	0	2	1	0	1	0	X	X	7
Carly Howard	0	0	1	0	0	1	0	1	X	X	3

Team	1	2	3	4	5	6	7	8	9	10	Final
Danielle Inglis	1	0	2	0	3	0	1	0	1	3	11
Hollie Duncan 🔨	0	1	0	3	0	1	0	4	0	0	9

== Tiebreaker ==
Saturday, January 28, 8:00 pm

Sheet A	1	2	3	4	5	6	7	8	9	10	11	Final
Carly Howard	0	1	0	2	0	1	0	0	0	1	0	5
Hollie Duncan 🔨	1	0	1	0	1	0	0	1	1	0	1	6

== Playoffs ==
Semifinal			Final
			1	Team Homan	9
2	Danielle Inglis	7	3	Hollie Duncan	2
3	Hollie Duncan	8

=== Semifinal ===
Sunday, January 29, 10:30 am

Sheet C	1	2	3	4	5	6	7	8	9	10	11	Final
Danielle Inglis 🔨	1	0	2	0	2	0	1	0	0	1	0	7
Hollie Duncan	0	2	0	3	0	2	0	0	0	0	1	8

=== Final ===
Sunday, January 29, 3:00 pm

Sheet C	1	2	3	4	5	6	7	8	9	10	Final
Team Homan 🔨	2	0	0	3	0	1	1	2	X	X	9
Hollie Duncan	0	1	0	0	1	0	0	0	X	X	2

2023 Ontario Scotties Tournament of Hearts

Tracy Fleury
2nd Ontario Provincial Championship title

== Qualification ==
=== Open Qualifier ===
January 7–8, Midland Curling Club, Midland

A1 Side		Semifinals		To STOH
		Allison Flaxey (Dundas Valley)	7
Abby Deschene (Acton)	3	Tori Zemmelink (Navan)	6
Tori Zemmelink (Navan)	7			Allison Flaxey (Dundas Valley)	0
Susan Froud (Alliston)	11			Susan Froud (Alliston)	7
Emily Lindsay (RCMP)	5	Susan Froud (Alliston)	7
Quinn Walsh (Leaside)	4	Cathy Auld (Thornhill)	6
Cathy Auld (Thornhill)	12

A2 Side		Semifinals		To STOH
Katelyn Wasylkiw (Whitby)	12
Emma Acres (RCMP)	2	Katelyn Wasylkiw (Whitby)	7
Breanna Rozon (Oshawa)	5	Amanda Gebhardt (Guelph)	6
Amanda Gebhardt (Guelph)	7			Katelyn Wasylkiw (Whitby)	0
Mackenzie Kiemele (Dixie)	11			Chelsea Brandwood (Listowel)	8
Sierra Sutherland (Rideau)	5	Mackenzie Kiemele (Dixie)	1
		Chelsea Brandwood (Listowel)	8

B1 Side
Breanna Rozon (Oshawa)	9
Emma Acres (RCMP)	5

Quarterfinals
Tori Zemmelink (Navan)	9
Breanna Rozon (Oshawa)	8
Sierra Sutherland (Rideau)	2
Cathy Auld (Thornhill)	8

Semifinals
Tori Zemmelink (Navan)	5
Cathy Auld (Thornhill)	9

To STOH
Katelyn Wasylkiw (Whitby)	7
Cathy Auld (Thornhill)	4

B2 Side
Quinn Walsh (Leaside)	5
Emily Lindsay (RCMP)	9

Quarterfinals
Abby Deschene (Acton)	9
Amanda Gebhardt (Guelph)	4
Emily Lindsay (RCMP)	5
Mackenzie Kiemele (Dixie)	9

Semifinals
Abby Deschene (Acton)	10
Mackenzie Kiemele (Dixie)	4

To STOH
Allison Flaxey (Dundas Valley)	9
Abby Deschene (Acton)	5
