= 2023 KW Fall Classic =

- Host city: Waterloo, Ontario
- Arena: KW Granite Club
- Dates: September 14–17
- Men's winner: (Ontario) Team Champ
- Curling club: Westmount G&CC, Kitchener
- Skip: Alex Champ
- Third: Charlie Richard
- Second: Austin Snyder
- Lead: Scott Clinton
- Alternate: Jess Bechard
- Finalist: (Switzerland) Yves Stocker
- Women's winner: (Ontario) Team McCarville
- Curling club: Fort William CC, Thunder Bay
- Skip: Krista McCarville
- Third: Andrea Kelly
- Second: Kendra Lilly
- Lead: Ashley Sippala
- Alternate: Sarah Potts
- Coach: Rick Lang
- Finalist: (Scotland) Rebecca Morrison

The 2023 KW Fall Classic was held from September 14 to 17 at the KW Granite Club in Waterloo, Ontario. The men's event was held in a triple knockout while the women's event was held in a round robin. The purse was $12,500 for the men and $11,800 for the women.

The event featured the Quebec rink of Félix Asselin, Laurie St-Georges, Émile Asselin and Emily Riley that won the 2022 Canadian Mixed Curling Championship as part of their training for the 2023 World Mixed Curling Championship in October.

== Men ==
=== Teams ===
The teams are listed as follows:

Skip	Third	Second	Lead	Alternate	Locale
Rob Ainsley	Chris Medford	Graeme Robson	Cameron Blair		Toronto, Ontario
Félix Asselin	Laurie St-Georges	Émile Asselin	Emily Riley		Montreal, Quebec
Carter Bryant	Nolan Bryant	Jacob Clarke	Matthew Abrams		Brantford, Ontario
Alex Champ	Charlie Richard	Austin Snyder	Scott Clinton	Jess Bechard	Toronto, Ontario
James Craik	Mark Watt	Angus Bryce	Blair Haswell		Forfar, Scotland
Ian Dickie	Paul Moffatt	Ben Shane	Kyle Forester		Kitchener, Ontario
Scott Dunnam	Cody Clouser	Lance Wheeler	Andrew Dunnam		(United States) Philadelphia, Pennsylvania
Pat Ferris	Landan Rooney	Connor Duhaime	Robert Currie		Grimsby, Ontario
Mike Fournier	Kevin Flewwelling	Sean Harrison	Zander Elmes		Toronto, Ontario
Rayad Husain	Jason Perreira	Baul Persaud	Darryl Narain		Georgetown, Guyana
Mark Kean	Brady Lumley	Matthew Garner	Spencer Dunlop		Woodstock, Ontario
Jayden King	Dylan Niepage	Gavin Lydiate	Daniel Del Conte		Guelph, Ontario
Sandy MacEwan	Dustin Montpellier	Lee Toner	Luc Ouimet		Sudbury, Ontario
Jordan McNamara	Wesley Forget	Ryan Godfrey	Brendan Laframboise		Ottawa, Ontario
Kibo Mulima	Owen Henry	Kyle Stratton	Matthew Duizer		Kitchener–Waterloo, Ontario
Fraser Reid	Shane Konings	Spencer Nuttall	Matt Pretty		Waterloo, Ontario
Go Aoki (Fourth)	Hayato Sato (Skip)	Kouki Ogiwara	Kazushi Nino	Ayato Sasaki	Sapporo, Japan
Yves Stocker	Kim Schwaller	Felix Eberhard	Tom Winkelhausen		Zug, Switzerland
Zackary Wise	Michael Solomon	Stewart Yaxley	Adam Cartwright		Montreal, Quebec

=== Knockout brackets ===
==== A Event ====
First Knockout	Qualifier 1
(Scotland) James Craik	8
(Ontario) Kibo Mulima	7	(Ontario) Kibo Mulima	1
(Ontario) Fraser Reid	3	(Scotland) James Craik	7
(Ontario) Alex Champ	5
(Ontario) Mark Kean	2
(Ontario) Alex Champ	8
(Scotland) James Craik	7
(Ontario) Jayden King	2
(Japan) Hayato Sato	8
(Ontario) Sandy MacEwan	2
(Japan) Hayato Sato	6
(Ontario) Jayden King	7
(United States) Scott Dunnam	4
(Ontario) Jayden King	5

First Knockout	Qualifier 2
(Ontario) Pat Ferris	5
(Ontario) Rob Ainsley	10	(Ontario) Rob Ainsley	6
(Guyana) Rayad Husain	2	(Ontario) Rob Ainsley	3
(Quebec) Félix Asselin	7
(Quebec) Félix Asselin	7
(Ontario) Mike Fournier	3
(Quebec) Félix Asselin	2
(Switzerland) Yves Stocker	7
(Switzerland) Yves Stocker	7
(Quebec) Zackary Wise	10	(Quebec) Zackary Wise	2
(Ontario) Carter Bryant	2	(Switzerland) Yves Stocker	5
(Ontario) Ian Dickie	3
(Ontario) Jordan McNamara	2
(Ontario) Ian Dickie	7

==== B Event ====
Second Knockout	Qualifier 3
(Ontario) Sandy MacEwan	7
(Ontario) Fraser Reid	2	(Ontario) Mark Kean	6
(Ontario) Mark Kean	8	(Ontario) Sandy MacEwan	5
(United States) Scott Dunnam	8
(Ontario) Kibo Mulima	5
(United States) Scott Dunnam	9
(United States) Scott Dunnam	5
(Quebec) Félix Asselin	7

Second Knockout	Qualifier 4
(Quebec) Zackary Wise	0
(Guyana) Rayad Husain	1	(Ontario) Mike Fournier	8
(Ontario) Mike Fournier	8	(Ontario) Mike Fournier	8
(Ontario) Pat Ferris	3
(Ontario) Pat Ferris	7
(Ontario) Carter Bryant	3	(Ontario) Jordan McNamara	2
(Ontario) Jordan McNamara	4	(Ontario) Mike Fournier	3
(Ontario) Jayden King	7

Second Knockout		Qualifier 5
(Ontario) Alex Champ	4
(Japan) Hayato Sato	6	(Japan) Hayato Sato	3
(Ontario) Rob Ainsley	1	(Ontario) Ian Dickie	7
(Ontario) Ian Dickie	6

==== C Event ====
Third Knockout	Qualifier 6
(Ontario) Fraser Reid	1
(Ontario) Kibo Mulima	6	(Ontario) Kibo Mulima	6
(Ontario) Mark Kean	4
(Ontario) Kibo Mulima	6
(Ontario) Rob Ainsley	4
(Ontario) Kibo Mulima	9
(Ontario) Mike Fournier	2

Third Knockout		Qualifier 7
(Ontario) Sandy MacEwan	6
(Ontario) Pat Ferris	4	(Ontario) Sandy MacEwan	8
		(Japan) Hayato Sato	6

Third Knockout						Qualifier 8
				(Ontario) Alex Champ	8
(Guyana) Rayad Husain	2			(Ontario) Jordan McNamara	1
(Ontario) Jordan McNamara	8	(Ontario) Jordan McNamara	7
(Ontario) Carter Bryant	7	(Ontario) Carter Bryant	1
(Quebec) Zackary Wise	2					(Ontario) Alex Champ	8
						(United States) Scott Dunnam	5

=== Knockout results ===
All draw times are listed in Eastern Time (UTC−04:00).

==== Draw 1 ====
Thursday, September 14, 7:00 pm

Sheet 4	1	2	3	4	5	6	7	8	Final
(Ontario) Kibo Mulima 🔨	0	2	1	2	0	0	2	X	7
(Ontario) Fraser Reid	0	0	0	0	2	1	0	X	3

==== Draw 2 ====
Thursday, September 14, 9:30 pm

Sheet 1	1	2	3	4	5	6	7	8	Final
(Ontario) Rob Ainsley 🔨	3	0	0	3	0	5	X	X	11
(Guyana) Rayad Husain	0	1	1	0	3	0	X	X	5

Sheet 2	1	2	3	4	5	6	7	8	Final
(Quebec) Zackary Wise 🔨	0	1	0	3	1	5	X	X	10
(Ontario) Carter Bryant	1	0	1	0	0	0	X	X	2

Sheet 5	1	2	3	4	5	6	7	8	Final
(Quebec) Félix Asselin 🔨	2	0	3	0	0	2	X	X	7
(Ontario) Mike Fournier	0	1	0	0	2	0	X	X	3

Sheet 6	1	2	3	4	5	6	7	8	Final
(Ontario) Jordan McNamara	0	0	1	1	0	0	X	X	2
(Ontario) Ian Dickie 🔨	2	1	0	0	2	2	X	X	7

==== Draw 3 ====
Friday, September 15, 8:00 am

Sheet 3	1	2	3	4	5	6	7	8	Final
(Scotland) James Craik	4	0	1	0	3	X	X	X	8
(Ontario) Kibo Mulima 🔨	0	0	0	1	0	X	X	X	1

Sheet 4	1	2	3	4	5	6	7	8	Final
(Ontario) Mark Kean	0	1	0	0	1	0	0	X	2
(Ontario) Alex Champ 🔨	0	0	2	3	0	1	2	X	8

==== Draw 4 ====
Friday, September 15, 10:30 am

Sheet 1	1	2	3	4	5	6	7	8	Final
(Ontario) Carter Bryant	0	1	0	0	2	0	0	X	3
(Ontario) Jordan McNamara 🔨	1	0	0	3	0	0	0	X	4

Sheet 2	1	2	3	4	5	6	7	8	Final
(Guyana) Rayad Husain 🔨	1	0	0	0	0	X	X	X	1
(Ontario) Mike Fournier	0	4	1	2	1	X	X	X	8

Sheet 3	1	2	3	4	5	6	7	8	Final
(Japan) Hayato Sato 🔨	0	1	1	0	0	2	4	X	8
(Ontario) Sandy MacEwan	0	0	0	0	2	0	0	X	2

Sheet 4	1	2	3	4	5	6	7	8	Final
(United States) Scott Dunnam 🔨	0	0	0	2	1	1	0	0	4
(Ontario) Jayden King	1	2	0	0	0	0	1	1	5

Sheet 5	1	2	3	4	5	6	7	8	Final
(Ontario) Pat Ferris 🔨	1	0	0	3	0	1	0	0	5
(Ontario) Rob Ainsley	0	2	2	0	1	0	0	1	6

Sheet 6	1	2	3	4	5	6	7	8	Final
(Switzerland) Yves Stocker	1	0	2	2	0	2	X	X	7
(Quebec) Zackary Wise 🔨	0	1	0	0	1	0	X	X	2

==== Draw 5 ====
Friday, September 15, 1:30 pm

Sheet 2	1	2	3	4	5	6	7	8	Final
(Ontario) Fraser Reid 🔨	1	0	1	0	0	0	X	X	2
(Ontario) Mark Kean	0	4	0	0	3	1	X	X	8

Sheet 5	1	2	3	4	5	6	7	8	Final
(Scotland) James Craik 🔨	1	2	0	0	0	3	0	1	7
(Ontario) Alex Champ	0	0	1	1	2	0	1	0	5

==== Draw 6 ====
Friday, September 15, 4:00 pm

Sheet 1	1	2	3	4	5	6	7	8	Final
(Ontario) Kibo Mulima 🔨	0	2	0	2	1	0	0	X	5
(United States) Scott Dunnam	3	0	2	0	0	3	1	X	9

Sheet 2	1	2	3	4	5	6	7	8	Final
(Ontario) Rob Ainsley 🔨	1	0	0	0	2	X	X	X	3
(Quebec) Félix Asselin	0	2	1	4	0	X	X	X	7

Sheet 3	1	2	3	4	5	6	7	8	Final
(Quebec) Zackary Wise 🔨	0	0	0	X	X	X	X	X	0
(Ontario) Mike Fournier	3	2	3	X	X	X	X	X	8

Sheet 4	1	2	3	4	5	6	7	8	Final
(Ontario) Pat Ferris 🔨	3	3	0	1	0	X	X	X	7
(Ontario) Jordan McNamara	0	0	1	0	1	X	X	X	2

Sheet 5	1	2	3	4	5	6	7	8	Final
(Switzerland) Yves Stocker	1	0	1	1	0	1	0	1	5
(Ontario) Ian Dickie 🔨	0	1	0	0	1	0	1	0	3

Sheet 6	1	2	3	4	5	6	7	8	Final
(Japan) Hayato Sato	0	2	0	0	2	0	2	0	6
(Ontario) Jayden King 🔨	1	0	2	1	0	1	0	2	7

==== Draw 8 ====
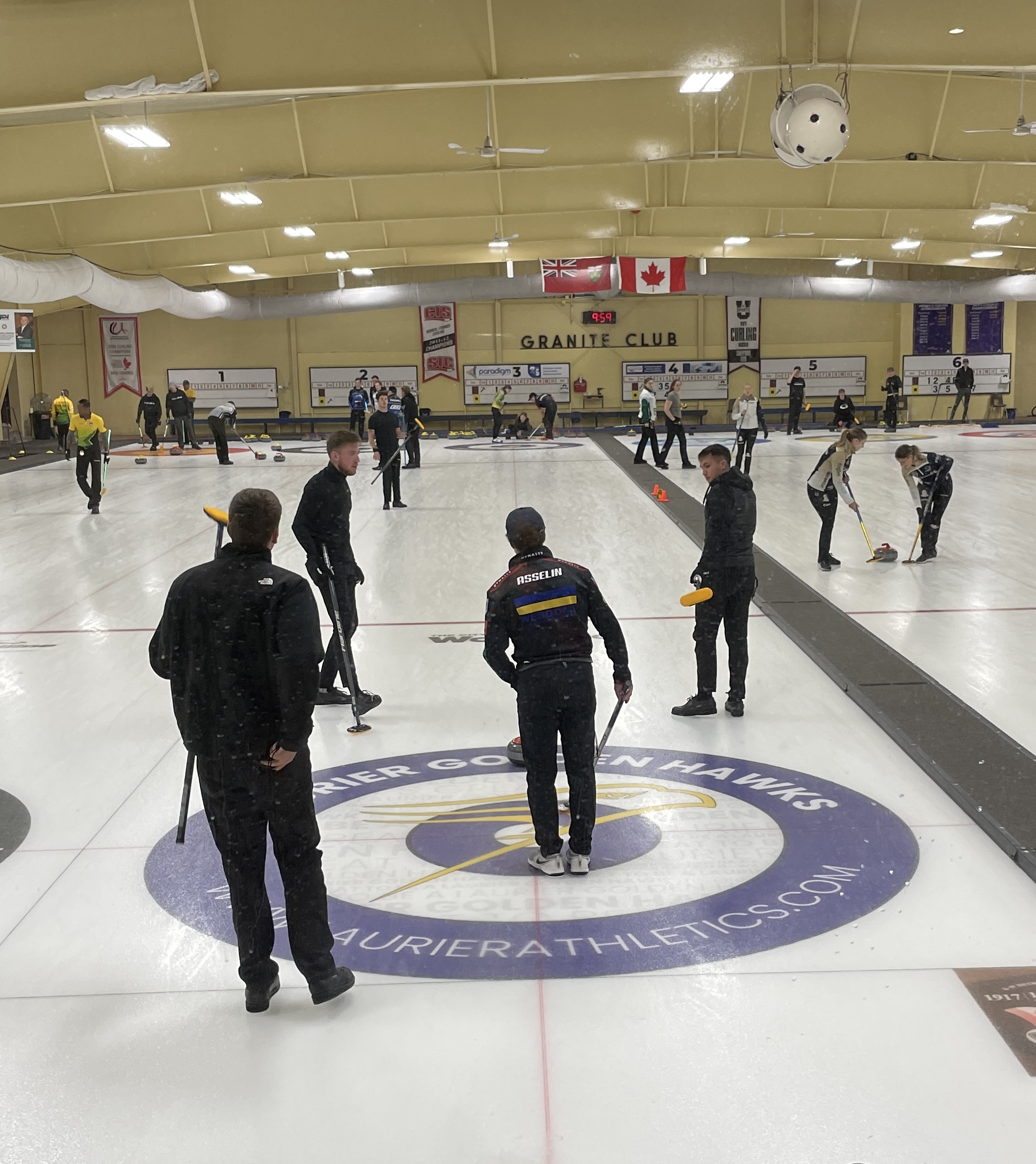
Draw 8 action

Friday, September 15, 9:30 pm

Sheet 1	1	2	3	4	5	6	7	8	Final
(Guyana) Rayad Husain	1	0	0	1	0	X	X	X	2
(Ontario) Jordan McNamara 🔨	0	3	2	0	3	X	X	X	8

Sheet 2	1	2	3	4	5	6	7	8	Final
(Scotland) James Craik	1	3	0	0	1	2	X	X	7
(Ontario) Jayden King 🔨	0	0	2	0	0	0	X	X	2

Sheet 3	1	2	3	4	5	6	7	8	Final
(Quebec) Félix Asselin	0	1	0	0	1	0	X	X	2
(Switzerland) Yves Stocker 🔨	2	0	2	0	0	3	X	X	7

Sheet 4	1	2	3	4	5	6	7	8	Final
(Ontario) Carter Bryant 🔨	1	0	0	3	1	2	X	X	7
(Quebec) Zackary Wise	0	1	1	0	0	0	X	X	2

Sheet 5	1	2	3	4	5	6	7	8	Final
(Ontario) Fraser Reid	0	1	0	0	0	X	X	X	1
(Ontario) Kibo Mulima 🔨	2	0	1	2	1	X	X	X	6

Sheet 6	1	2	3	4	5	6	7	8	Final
(Ontario) Sandy MacEwan	1	0	1	0	4	0	0	1	7
(Ontario) Mark Kean 🔨	0	2	0	1	0	1	2	0	6

==== Draw 10 ====
Saturday, September 16, 10:30 am

Sheet 1	1	2	3	4	5	6	7	8	Final
(Ontario) Mike Fournier 🔨	1	1	0	1	0	5	X	X	8
(Ontario) Pat Ferris	0	0	2	0	1	0	X	X	3

Sheet 2	1	2	3	4	5	6	7	8	Final
(Ontario) Alex Champ 🔨	1	0	1	0	0	1	1	0	4
(Japan) Hayato Sato	0	2	0	0	3	0	0	1	6

Sheet 3	1	2	3	4	5	6	7	8	Final
(Ontario) Rob Ainsley	0	0	0	1	0	X	X	X	1
(Ontario) Ian Dickie 🔨	0	3	2	0	1	X	X	X	6

Sheet 4	1	2	3	4	5	6	7	8	Final
(Ontario) Kibo Mulima 🔨	0	2	0	1	0	2	0	1	6
(Ontario) Mark Kean	0	0	3	0	1	0	0	0	4

Sheet 5	1	2	3	4	5	6	7	8	Final
(Ontario) Sandy MacEwan 🔨	0	0	0	1	2	2	0	0	5
(United States) Scott Dunnam	1	1	1	0	0	0	4	1	8

Sheet 6	1	2	3	4	5	6	7	8	Final
(Ontario) Jordan McNamara	1	1	2	0	3	X	X	X	7
(Ontario) Carter Bryant 🔨	0	0	0	1	0	X	X	X	1

==== Draw 12 ====
Saturday, September 16, 4:00 pm

Sheet 1	1	2	3	4	5	6	7	8	Final
(Ontario) Kibo Mulima 🔨	0	0	1	0	0	3	1	1	6
(Ontario) Rob Ainsley	0	1	0	2	1	0	0	0	4

Sheet 2	1	2	3	4	5	6	7	8	Final
(United States) Scott Dunnam	0	2	0	1	0	2	0	X	5
(Quebec) Félix Asselin 🔨	2	0	2	0	1	0	2	X	7

Sheet 3	1	2	3	4	5	6	7	8	Final
(Ontario) Alex Champ 🔨	2	0	2	1	2	1	X	X	8
(Ontario) Jordan McNamara	0	1	0	0	0	0	X	X	1

Sheet 4	1	2	3	4	5	6	7	8	Final
(Japan) Hayato Sato 🔨	0	2	0	0	0	1	0	0	3
(Ontario) Ian Dickie	1	0	0	1	1	0	2	2	7

Sheet 5	1	2	3	4	5	6	7	8	Final
(Ontario) Mike Fournier	0	0	2	0	1	0	X	X	3
(Ontario) Jayden King 🔨	3	1	0	1	0	2	X	X	7

Sheet 6	1	2	3	4	5	6	7	8	Final
(Ontario) Sandy MacEwan	1	0	1	0	1	2	1	0	6
(Ontario) Pat Ferris 🔨	0	1	0	2	0	0	0	1	4

==== Draw 14 ====
Saturday, September 16, 9:30 pm

Sheet 1	1	2	3	4	5	6	7	8	Final
(Ontario) Sandy MacEwan 🔨	3	0	0	0	2	0	0	3	8
(Japan) Hayato Sato	0	2	2	1	0	1	0	0	6

Sheet 2	1	2	3	4	5	6	7	8	Final
(Ontario) Kibo Mulima 🔨	5	1	0	0	3	X	X	X	9
(Ontario) Mike Fournier	0	0	1	1	0	X	X	X	2

Sheet 3	1	2	3	4	5	6	7	8	Final
(Ontario) Alex Champ	2	0	2	0	0	0	3	1	8
(United States) Scott Dunnam 🔨	0	1	0	1	1	2	0	0	5

=== Playoffs ===
Quarterfinals
1	(Scotland) James Craik	7
8	(Ontario) Alex Champ	8
4	(Ontario) Jayden King	1
5	(Ontario) Ian Dickie	7
2	(Switzerland) Yves Stocker	7
7	(Ontario) Sandy MacEwan	2
3	(Quebec) Félix Asselin	6
6	(Ontario) Kibo Mulima	2

Semifinals
8	(Ontario) Alex Champ	7
5	(Ontario) Ian Dickie	3
2	(Switzerland) Yves Stocker	7
3	(Quebec) Félix Asselin	3

Final
8	(Ontario) Alex Champ	6
2	(Switzerland) Yves Stocker	5

==== Quarterfinals ====
Sunday, September 17, 11:30 am

Sheet 2	1	2	3	4	5	6	7	8	Final
(Ontario) Jayden King	0	0	1	0	0	X	X	X	1
(Ontario) Ian Dickie 🔨	0	2	0	4	1	X	X	X	7

Sheet 3	1	2	3	4	5	6	7	8	Final
(Scotland) James Craik 🔨	0	0	2	0	0	3	2	0	7
(Ontario) Alex Champ	2	3	0	1	1	0	0	1	8

Sheet 4	1	2	3	4	5	6	7	8	Final
(Switzerland) Yves Stocker 🔨	1	0	0	0	3	3	X	X	7
(Ontario) Sandy MacEwan	0	1	0	1	0	0	X	X	2

Sheet 5	1	2	3	4	5	6	7	8	Final
(Quebec) Félix Asselin 🔨	0	0	0	2	0	1	0	3	6
(Ontario) Kibo Mulima	0	0	1	0	0	0	1	0	2

==== Semifinals ====
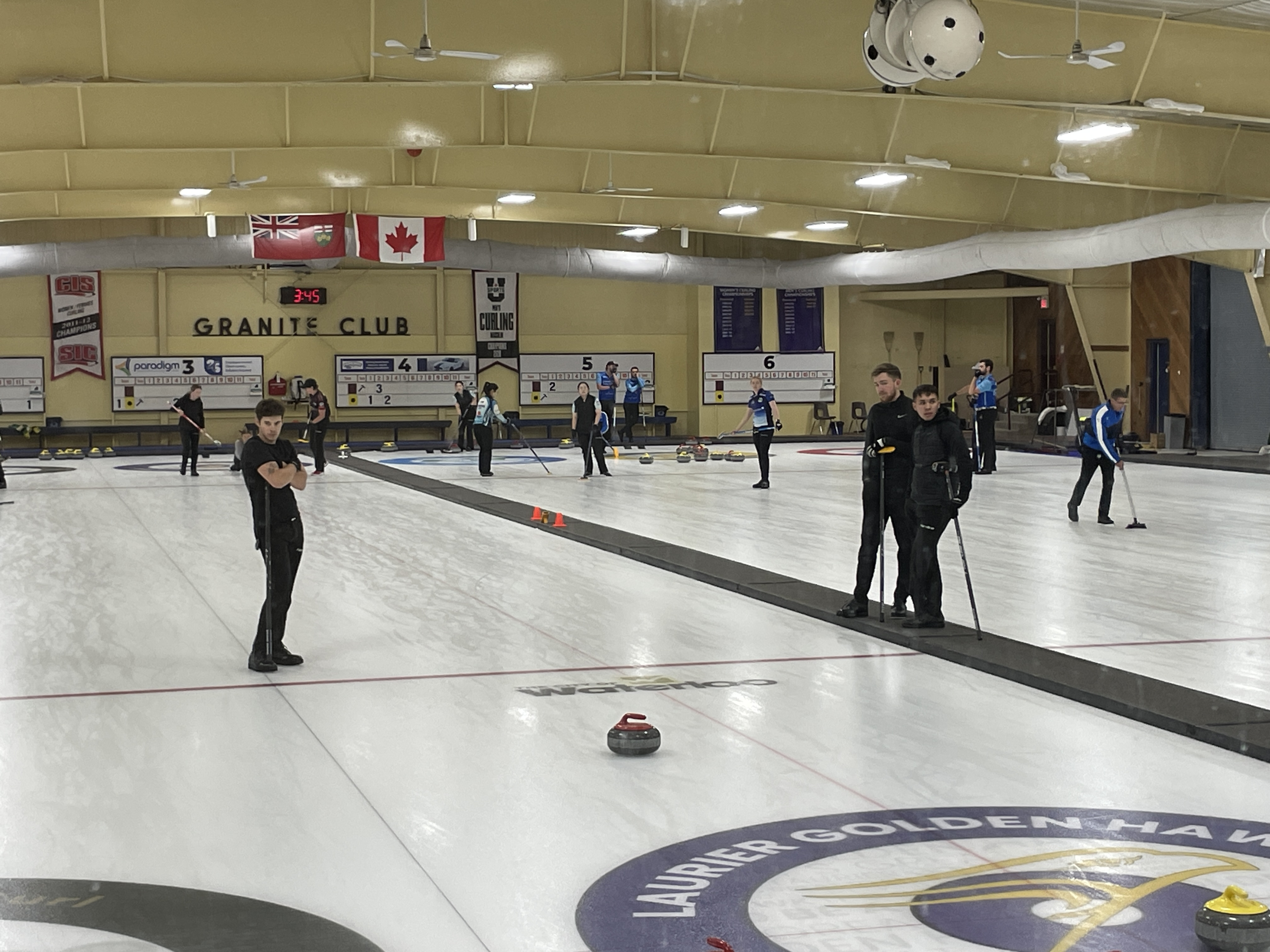
Semifinal action

Sunday, September 17, 2:30 pm

Sheet 3	1	2	3	4	5	6	7	8	Final
(Switzerland) Yves Stocker 🔨	0	4	1	0	1	0	1	X	7
(Quebec) Félix Asselin	0	0	0	2	0	1	0	X	3

Sheet 5	1	2	3	4	5	6	7	8	Final
(Ontario) Alex Champ	0	1	3	0	0	3	X	X	7
(Ontario) Ian Dickie 🔨	0	0	0	1	2	0	X	X	3

==== Final ====
Sunday, September 17, 5:30 pm

Sheet 2	1	2	3	4	5	6	7	8	Final
(Ontario) Alex Champ	0	0	0	3	0	2	0	1	6
(Switzerland) Yves Stocker 🔨	0	2	1	0	0	0	2	0	5

== Women ==
=== Teams ===
The teams are listed as follows:

Skip	Third	Second	Lead	Alternate	Locale
Hailey Armstrong	Jessica Humphries	Michaela Robert	Terri Weeks		Ottawa, Ontario
Sarah Bailey	Katie Ford	Madison Fisher	Emily Middaugh		St. Catharines, Ontario
Paige Bown	Meaghan Mallett	Jessica Byers	Celeste Gauthier		Navan, Ontario
Chelsea Brandwood	Megan Smith	Brenda Chapman	Keira McLaughlin		Niagara Falls, Ontario
Hollie Duncan	Megan Balsdon	Rachelle Strybosch	Tess Guyatt		Woodstock, Ontario
Susan Froud	Kerry Lackie	Kristin Turcotte	Julie McMullin		Alliston, Ontario
Jo-Ann Rizzo (Fourth)	Sarah Koltun	Margot Flemming	Kerry Galusha (Skip)		Yellowknife, Northwest Territories
Ha Seung-youn	Kim Hye-rin	Yang Tae-i	Kim Su-jin		Chuncheon, South Korea
Kaitlin Jewer	Breanna Rozon	Kristina Brauch	Audrey de Sousa		Peterborough, Ontario
Mackenzie Kiemele	Jillian Uniacke	Emilie Lovitt	Jessica Flipcic		Toronto, Ontario
Kim Eun-jung	Kim Kyeong-ae	Kim Cho-hi	Kim Seon-yeong	Kim Yeong-mi	Gangneung, South Korea
Isabelle Ladouceur	Grace Lloyd	Jamie Smith	Rachel Steele		Whitby, Ontario
Krista McCarville	Andrea Kelly	Kendra Lilly	Ashley Sippala	Sarah Potts	Thunder Bay, Ontario
Emilie Metcalfe	Erin Butler	Carly Houghton	Emma Malfara		Peterborough, Ontario
Rebecca Morrison	Jennifer Dodds	Sophie Sinclair	Sophie Jackson	Gina Aitken	Stirling, Scotland
Quinn Walsh	Brooke Davies	Mackenzie Cryderman	Melissa Retz		Oshawa, Ontario
Katelyn Wasylkiw	Lauren Wasylkiw	Stephanie Thompson	Alice Holyoke		Milton, Ontario
Tori Zemmelink	Emma Artichuk	Lauren Rajala	Katie Shaw		Guelph, Ontario

=== Round robin standings ===
Final Round Robin Standings

Key
Teams to Playoffs

Pool A	W	L	PF	PA
(South Korea) Ha Seung-youn	4	0	31	7
(Ontario) Hollie Duncan	3	1	25	17
(Ontario) Chelsea Brandwood	2	2	27	18
(Ontario) Mackenzie Kiemele	1	3	15	24
(Ontario) Quinn Walsh	0	4	3	35

Pool B	W	L	PF	PA
(Ontario) Susan Froud	4	0	28	15
(Scotland) Rebecca Morrison	3	1	29	10
(Ontario) Hailey Armstrong	2	2	21	21
(Ontario) Kaitlin Jewer	1	3	18	31
(Ontario) Emilie Metcalfe	0	4	17	36

Pool C	W	L	PF	PA
(Ontario) Isabelle Ladouceur	4	0	31	21
(Ontario) Krista McCarville	3	1	28	19
(Ontario) Paige Bown	1	3	17	32
(Ontario) Katelyn Wasylkiw	1	3	16	29

Pool D	W	L	PF	PA
(Northwest Territories) Kerry Galusha	3	1	31	18
(South Korea) Kim Eun-jung	2	2	29	18
(Ontario) Sarah Bailey	2	2	25	26
(Ontario) Tori Zemmelink	0	4	16	30

=== Round robin results ===
All draw times are listed in Eastern Time (UTC−04:00).

==== Draw 1 ====
Thursday, September 14, 7:00 pm

Sheet 5	1	2	3	4	5	6	7	8	Final
(Ontario) Krista McCarville	0	2	0	2	0	0	2	1	7
(South Korea) Kim Eun-jung 🔨	0	0	2	0	2	1	0	0	5

Sheet 6	1	2	3	4	5	6	7	8	Final
(South Korea) Ha Seung-youn 🔨	2	2	4	2	X	X	X	X	10
(Ontario) Quinn Walsh	0	0	0	0	X	X	X	X	0

==== Draw 2 ====
Thursday, September 14, 9:30 pm

Sheet 3	1	2	3	4	5	6	7	8	Final
(Ontario) Isabelle Ladouceur 🔨	1	1	0	0	2	3	X	X	7
(Ontario) Tori Zemmelink	0	0	1	1	0	0	X	X	2

Sheet 4	1	2	3	4	5	6	7	8	9	Final
(Scotland) Rebecca Morrison 🔨	0	0	0	0	0	3	0	0	0	3
(Ontario) Susan Froud	0	0	0	0	0	0	2	1	1	4

==== Draw 3 ====
Friday, September 15, 8:00 am

Sheet 1	1	2	3	4	5	6	7	8	Final
(Ontario) Hollie Duncan	0	3	0	2	0	2	0	X	7
(Ontario) Chelsea Brandwood 🔨	1	0	1	0	1	0	1	X	4

Sheet 2	1	2	3	4	5	6	7	8	Final
(Ontario) Paige Bown 🔨	0	0	0	1	1	0	X	X	2
(Ontario) Sarah Bailey	1	0	1	0	0	5	X	X	7

Sheet 5	1	2	3	4	5	6	7	8	Final
(Ontario) Hailey Armstrong 🔨	3	1	0	0	1	0	2	1	8
(Ontario) Kaitlin Jewer	0	0	1	2	0	2	0	0	5

Sheet 6	1	2	3	4	5	6	7	8	Final
(Ontario) Katelyn Wasylkiw	0	0	1	0	1	0	X	X	2
(Northwest Territories) Kerry Galusha 🔨	2	5	0	1	0	1	X	X	9

==== Draw 5 ====
Friday, September 15, 1:30 pm

Sheet 1	1	2	3	4	5	6	7	8	Final
(South Korea) Ha Seung-youn 🔨	1	2	0	3	2	X	X	X	8
(Ontario) Mackenzie Kiemele	0	0	0	0	0	X	X	X	0

Sheet 3	1	2	3	4	5	6	7	8	Final
(Ontario) Katelyn Wasylkiw	0	5	0	0	1	0	0	0	6
(Ontario) Sarah Bailey 🔨	3	0	2	1	0	1	0	1	8

Sheet 4	1	2	3	4	5	6	7	8	Final
(Ontario) Paige Bown 🔨	0	3	0	0	0	0	X	X	3
(Northwest Territories) Kerry Galusha	1	0	3	1	1	3	X	X	9

Sheet 6	1	2	3	4	5	6	7	8	Final
(Scotland) Rebecca Morrison 🔨	2	0	2	0	4	3	X	X	11
(Ontario) Emilie Metcalfe	0	1	0	1	0	0	X	X	2

==== Draw 7 ====
Friday, September 15, 7:00 pm

Sheet 1	1	2	3	4	5	6	7	8	Final
(Ontario) Kaitlin Jewer	0	0	3	3	0	0	2	1	9
(Ontario) Emilie Metcalfe 🔨	1	2	0	0	1	2	0	0	6

Sheet 2	1	2	3	4	5	6	7	8	Final
(Ontario) Isabelle Ladouceur 🔨	2	1	1	0	0	1	0	1	6
(South Korea) Kim Eun-jung	0	0	0	1	2	0	2	0	5

Sheet 3	1	2	3	4	5	6	7	8	Final
(Ontario) Hailey Armstrong 🔨	0	1	0	1	1	1	0	1	5
(Ontario) Susan Froud	1	0	3	0	0	0	2	0	6

Sheet 4	1	2	3	4	5	6	7	8	Final
(Ontario) Hollie Duncan 🔨	1	0	2	0	1	1	1	0	6
(Ontario) Mackenzie Kiemele	0	2	0	2	0	0	0	1	5

Sheet 5	1	2	3	4	5	6	7	8	Final
(Ontario) Chelsea Brandwood 🔨	3	0	3	4	X	X	X	X	10
(Ontario) Quinn Walsh	0	1	0	0	X	X	X	X	1

Sheet 6	1	2	3	4	5	6	7	8	Final
(Ontario) Krista McCarville	0	0	2	0	2	0	4	X	8
(Ontario) Tori Zemmelink 🔨	1	1	0	2	0	1	0	X	5

==== Draw 9 ====
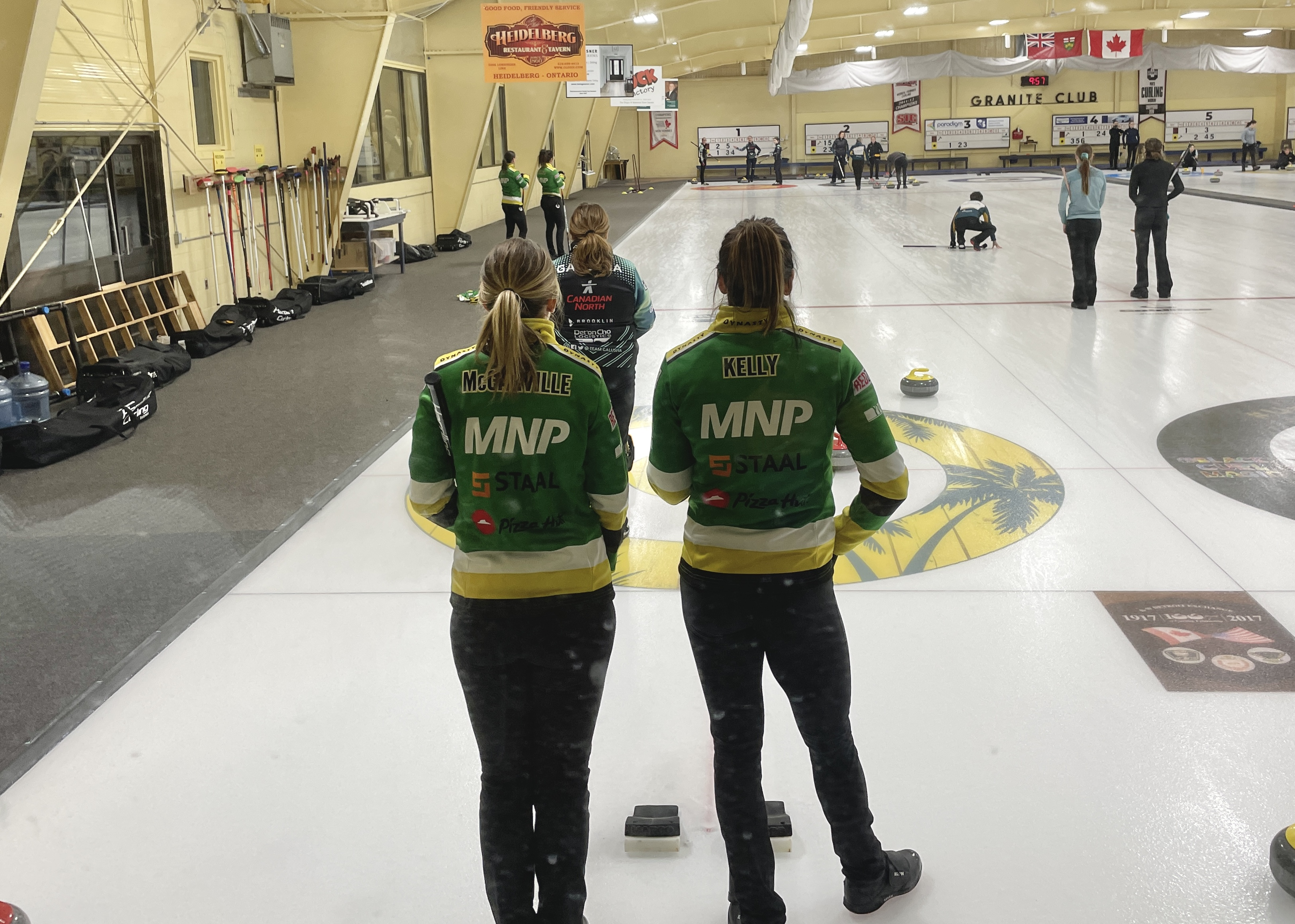
Draw 9 action

Saturday, September 16, 8:00 am

Sheet 1	1	2	3	4	5	6	7	8	Final
(Ontario) Krista McCarville	0	1	0	0	2	0	0	X	3
(Northwest Territories) Kerry Galusha 🔨	1	0	2	1	0	1	1	X	6

Sheet 2	1	2	3	4	5	6	7	8	Final
(Ontario) Susan Froud	0	1	1	3	0	0	3	2	10
(Ontario) Emilie Metcalfe 🔨	1	0	0	0	1	3	0	0	5

Sheet 3	1	2	3	4	5	6	7	8	Final
(Ontario) Mackenzie Kiemele 🔨	2	2	1	2	X	X	X	X	7
(Ontario) Quinn Walsh	0	0	0	0	X	X	X	X	0

Sheet 4	1	2	3	4	5	6	7	8	Final
(Ontario) Katelyn Wasylkiw	0	0	1	0	1	1	0	X	3
(South Korea) Kim Eun-jung 🔨	3	3	0	1	0	0	2	X	9

Sheet 5	1	2	3	4	5	6	7	8	Final
(Ontario) Paige Bown 🔨	1	0	4	0	0	3	2	X	10
(Ontario) Tori Zemmelink	0	3	0	2	1	0	0	X	6

Sheet 6	1	2	3	4	5	6	7	8	9	Final
(Ontario) Isabelle Ladouceur 🔨	0	2	0	1	0	4	0	0	1	8
(Ontario) Sarah Bailey	0	0	1	0	2	0	3	1	0	7

==== Draw 11 ====
Saturday, September 16, 1:30 pm

Sheet 1	1	2	3	4	5	6	7	8	Final
(Ontario) Paige Bown	0	1	0	1	0	0	X	X	2
(South Korea) Kim Eun-jung 🔨	0	0	3	0	4	3	X	X	10

Sheet 2	1	2	3	4	5	6	7	8	Final
(Ontario) Katelyn Wasylkiw	0	1	1	0	1	2	0	X	5
(Ontario) Tori Zemmelink 🔨	2	0	0	1	0	0	0	X	3

Sheet 3	1	2	3	4	5	6	7	8	Final
(Scotland) Rebecca Morrison 🔨	0	2	0	4	2	1	X	X	9
(Ontario) Kaitlin Jewer	1	0	1	0	0	0	X	X	2

Sheet 4	1	2	3	4	5	6	7	8	Final
(Ontario) Hailey Armstrong	0	0	1	2	0	2	0	1	6
(Ontario) Emilie Metcalfe 🔨	1	1	0	0	1	0	1	0	4

Sheet 5	1	2	3	4	5	6	7	8	Final
(South Korea) Ha Seung-youn 🔨	0	1	0	0	1	0	3	1	6
(Ontario) Hollie Duncan	0	0	1	2	0	1	0	0	4

Sheet 6	1	2	3	4	5	6	7	8	Final
(Ontario) Chelsea Brandwood 🔨	0	0	2	2	0	2	4	X	10
(Ontario) Mackenzie Kiemele	2	0	0	0	1	0	0	X	3

==== Draw 13 ====
Saturday, September 16, 7:00 pm

Sheet 1	1	2	3	4	5	6	7	8	Final
(Scotland) Rebecca Morrison	1	0	3	2	0	0	X	X	6
(Ontario) Hailey Armstrong 🔨	0	1	0	0	0	1	X	X	2

Sheet 2	1	2	3	4	5	6	7	8	Final
(Ontario) Hollie Duncan 🔨	1	1	0	4	2	X	X	X	8
(Ontario) Quinn Walsh	0	0	2	0	0	X	X	X	2

Sheet 3	1	2	3	4	5	6	7	8	Final
(South Korea) Ha Seung-youn	2	1	0	0	3	0	1	X	7
(Ontario) Chelsea Brandwood 🔨	0	0	1	1	0	1	0	X	3

Sheet 4	1	2	3	4	5	6	7	8	Final
(Ontario) Krista McCarville 🔨	3	2	0	1	0	1	3	X	10
(Ontario) Sarah Bailey	0	0	2	0	1	0	0	X	3

Sheet 5	1	2	3	4	5	6	7	8	9	Final
(Ontario) Isabelle Ladouceur 🔨	3	0	2	0	1	1	0	0	3	10
(Northwest Territories) Kerry Galusha	0	4	0	1	0	0	0	2	0	7

Sheet 6	1	2	3	4	5	6	7	8	Final
(Ontario) Kaitlin Jewer 🔨	0	0	0	1	0	1	0	X	2
(Ontario) Susan Froud	1	1	0	0	2	0	4	X	8

=== Playoffs ===
Quarterfinals
1	(Ontario) Isabelle Ladouceur	6
8	(South Korea) Kim Eun-jung	11
4	(Scotland) Rebecca Morrison	6
5	(Northwest Territories) Kerry Galusha	4
2	(Ontario) Susan Froud	3
7	(Ontario) Krista McCarville	8
3	(South Korea) Ha Seung-youn	4
6	(Ontario) Hollie Duncan	3

Semifinals
8	(South Korea) Kim Eun-jung	2
4	(Scotland) Rebecca Morrison	8
7	(Ontario) Krista McCarville	7
3	(South Korea) Ha Seung-youn	3

Final
4	(Scotland) Rebecca Morrison	3
7	(Ontario) Krista McCarville	7

==== Quarterfinals ====
Sunday, September 17, 9:00 am

Sheet 2	1	2	3	4	5	6	7	8	Final
(Scotland) Rebecca Morrison	0	1	0	2	0	0	2	1	6
(Northwest Territories) Kerry Galusha 🔨	1	0	2	0	0	1	0	0	4

Sheet 3	1	2	3	4	5	6	7	8	Final
(Ontario) Isabelle Ladouceur 🔨	1	0	4	0	0	1	0	X	6
(South Korea) Kim Eun-jung	0	2	0	4	1	0	4	X	11

Sheet 4	1	2	3	4	5	6	7	8	Final
(South Korea) Ha Seung-youn 🔨	2	0	0	0	0	1	0	1	4
(Ontario) Hollie Duncan	0	1	0	0	1	0	1	0	3

Sheet 5	1	2	3	4	5	6	7	8	Final
(Ontario) Susan Froud 🔨	1	1	0	1	0	0	0	X	3
(Ontario) Krista McCarville	0	0	2	0	1	3	2	X	8

==== Semifinals ====
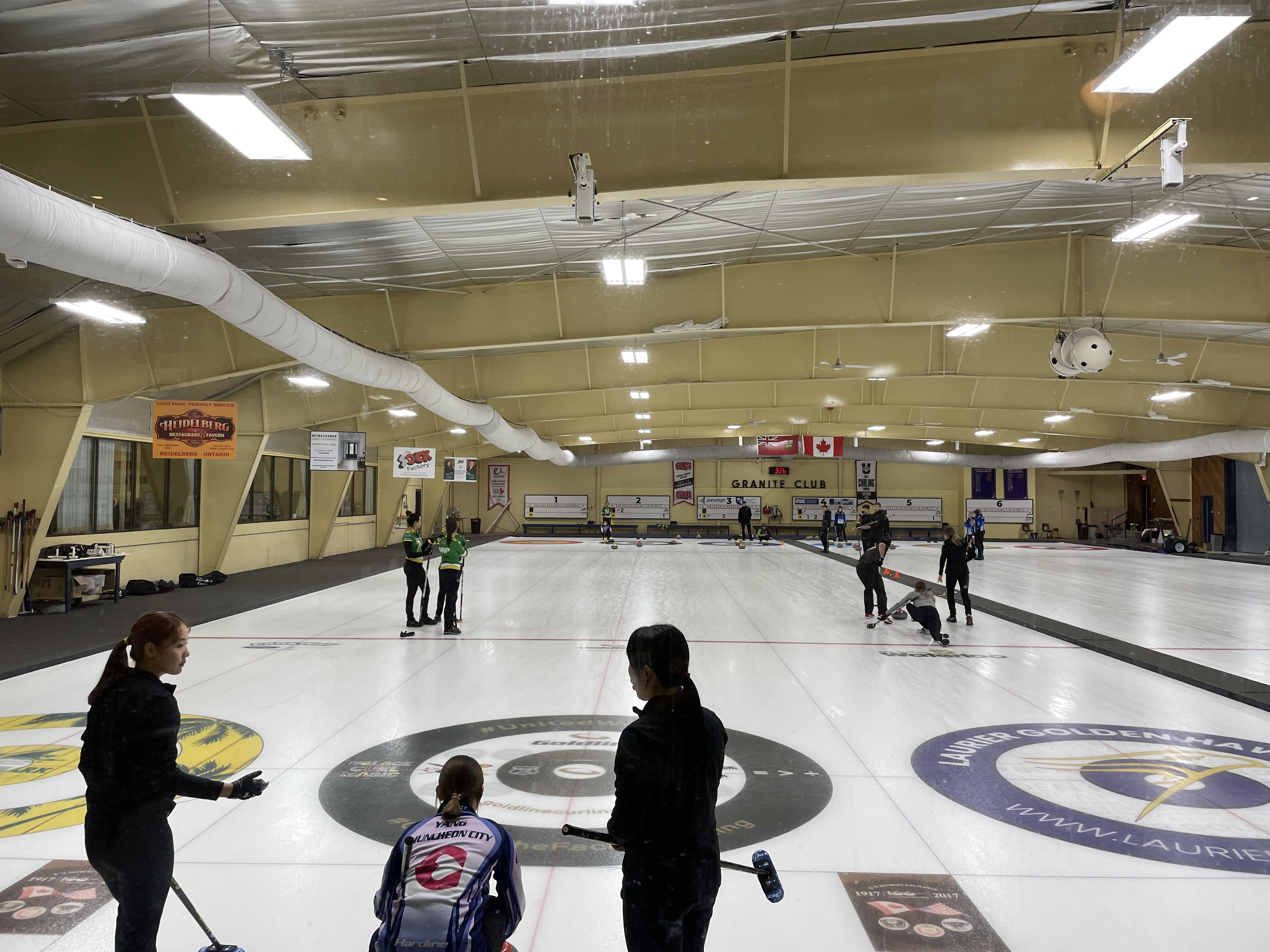
Semifinal action

Sunday, September 17, 2:30 pm

Sheet 2	1	2	3	4	5	6	7	8	Final
(Ontario) Krista McCarville	0	0	0	2	1	1	0	3	7
(South Korea) Ha Seung-youn 🔨	0	1	1	0	0	0	1	0	3

Sheet 4	1	2	3	4	5	6	7	8	Final
(South Korea) Kim Eun-jung	0	0	2	0	0	0	X	X	2
(Scotland) Rebecca Morrison 🔨	1	2	0	3	1	1	X	X	8

==== Final ====
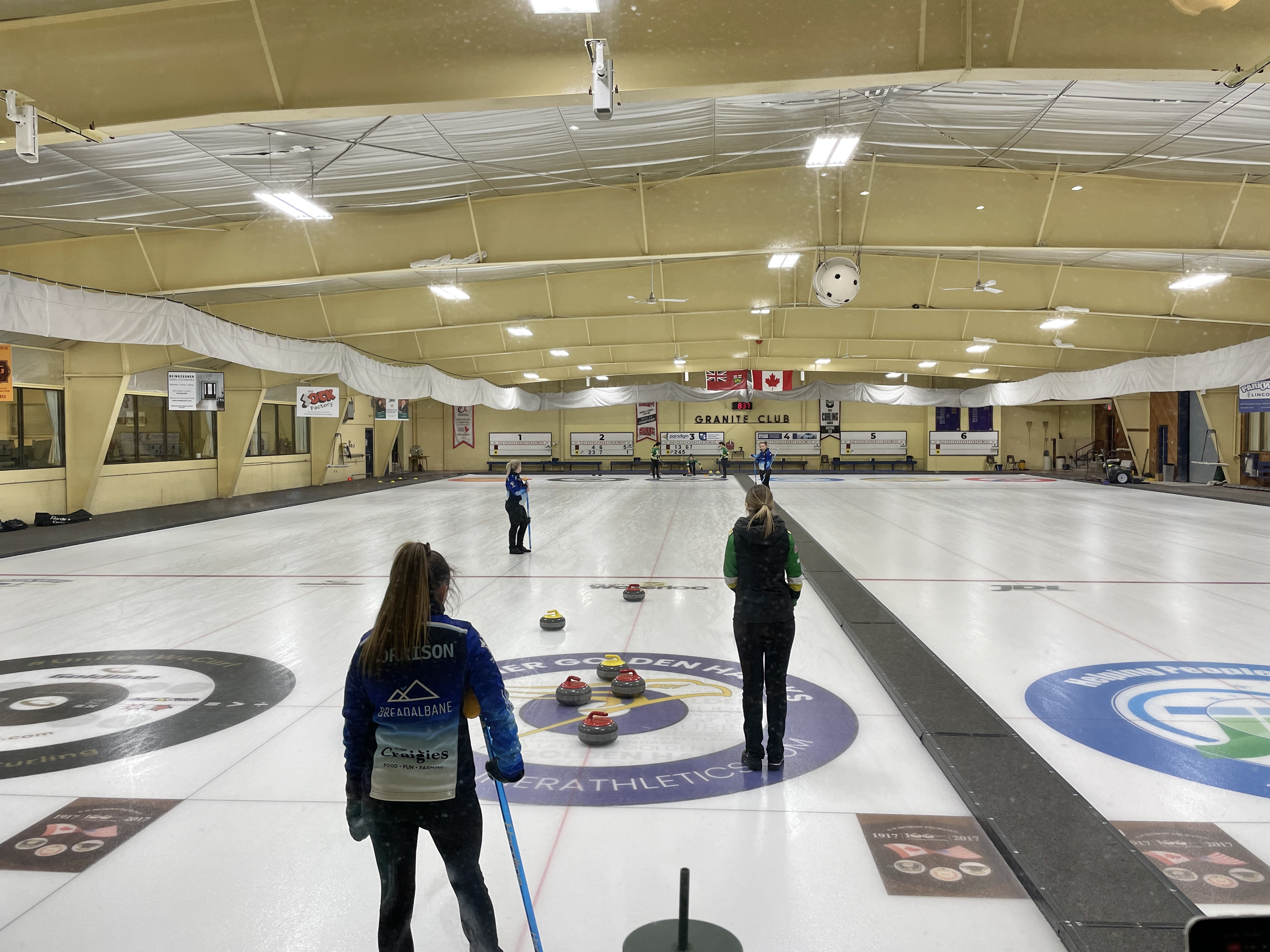
Final action

Sunday, September 17, 5:30 pm

Sheet 3	1	2	3	4	5	6	7	8	Final
(Scotland) Rebecca Morrison 🔨	0	1	0	1	1	0	0	0	3
(Ontario) Krista McCarville	1	0	1	0	0	2	1	2	7
