= Grace Lloyd =

Canadian curler

- Curler
- Born: December 10, 2000 (age 25); Hamilton, Ontario

Team
- Curling club: Whitby CC, Whitby, ON
- Skip: Grace Lloyd
- Third: Evelyn Robert
- Second: Michaela Robert
- Lead: Rachel Steele

Curling career
- Member Association: Ontario
- Hearts: 1 (2026)

Grace Elizabeth Alberta Lloyd (born December 10, 2000) is a Canadian curler from Dundas, Ontario. She currently skips her own team. Playing with Hailey Armstrong, she represented Ontario at the 2026 Scotties Tournament of Hearts.

== Curling career ==
=== Juniors ===
Lloyd most notably curled for the McMaster Marauders women's curling team in University-level curling. She would first play as second for the team skipped by Madelyn Warriner at the 2020 U Sports/Curling Canada University Curling Championships. The team placed fourth, with a 4–5 record. Following the event, Lloyd was named as a first-team All-Canadian. She was also named McMaster Athlete of the Week. Lloyd played third for McMaster (skipped by Warriner) again at the 2023 U Sports/Curling Canada University Curling Championships. There, the team missed the playoffs, finishing with a 3–4 record. After the event, Lloyd was named to the All-Canadian second team. In total, Lloyd played in four straight Ontario University Athletics (OUA) Championships, winning provincial titles in 2020 and 2023.

Outside of University curling, Lloyd curled for the Emily Deschenes junior rink in 2020, playing second on the team. The rink won the 2022 Ontario U-21 Curling Championships. The team represented "Ontario 1" at the 2022 Canadian Junior Curling Championships, where they made it to the final, where they lost to Nova Scotia 1, skipped by Taylour Stevens in the final. While also Junior age, Lloyd played third for the Susan Froud rink at the 2022 Ontario Scotties Tournament of Hearts, which had been postponed until April of that year due to the COVID-19 pandemic in Ontario. The team finished 3–4 at the event.

=== Women's ===
Lloyd joined the Isabelle Ladouceur rink at second position in 2022 after graduating from the junior ranks. They had a strong first season in 2022–23, winning the North Grenville Curling Club Women's Fall Classic, the Stroud Sleeman Cash Spiel and the Gord Carroll Curling Classic events on the tour. The team also played in their first Grand Slam of Curling event at the 2023 Canadian Open. They lost all three of their games in the triple knockout event. They also qualified for the Ontario Scotties Tournament of Hearts that season, going 2–3. By virtue of winning the North Grenville Fall Classic, the team qualified for the season ending Champions Cup Grand Slam event. Lloyd and third Jamie Smith switched positions for the event, with Lloyd throwing third stones. At the Champions Cup, the team finished 1–4.

For the 2023–24 curling season, Lloyd continued playing third on the team. The Ladouceur rink played in the 2023 PointsBet Invitational event, put on by Curling Canada. The team won their first round game against Serena Gray-Withers, but lost in the second round to Rachel Homan. The team played in the 2024 Ontario Scotties Tournament of Hearts, where they qualified for the playoffs, before losing to Chelsea Brandwood rink in the C1 vs C2 game.

Lloyd would join the new Hailey Armstrong rink as their third for the 2025-26 curling season, now curling out of the Whitby Curling Club alongside Michaela Robert, Rachel Steele, and Lori Eddy. Lloyd would win her first provincial women's championship that season at the 2026 Ontario Women's Curling Championship, beating Danielle Inglis 10–3 in the final, qualifying the team to represent Ontario as the host team at the 2026 Scotties Tournament of Hearts that was held in Mississauga, Ontario. There, they would finish the round robin with a 5–3 record, just missing the playoffs in 8th place.

Immediately following the 2026 Scotties, Lloyd alongside Robert and Steele, announced that they were leaving Team Armstrong "due to philosophical differences" and would form a new team with Lloyd skipping and Evelyn Robert joining as their new third. In their first season together in 2026-27, Lloyd would start strong and win their first tournament on tour at the Saville U25 Challenge over South Korea's Park You-been. This win also qualified them for the 2026 GSOC Masters, Lloyd's first Grand Slam of Curling event. There, they would finish the round robin winless with an 0–4 record.

== Personal life ==
Lloyd's hometown is Dundas, Ontario. She attended McMaster University for kinesiology, graduating in 2023 with distinction. As of 2023, she works as a kinesiologist for the Stott Physiotherapy Clinic, and is part of the curling coaching staff at McMaster University. Her sister Emily is also a curler.

== Grand Slam record ==
Key
C	Champion
F	Lost in Final
SF	Lost in Semifinal
QF	Lost in Quarterfinals
R16	Lost in the round of 16
Q	Did not advance to playoffs
T2	Played in Tier 2 event
DNP	Did not participate in event
N/A	Not a Grand Slam event that season

Event	2026–27
Masters	Q
