= Calissa Daly =

Canadian curler (born 1998)

- Curler
- Born: December 19, 1998 (age 27); Pembroke, Ontario

Team
- Curling club: Rideau CC, Ottawa, ON
- Skip: Sarah Daniels
- Third: Abby Ackland
- Second: Calissa Daly
- Lead: Dayna Demmans

Curling career
- Member Association: Ontario (2014–2016; 2018–2019; 2020–2026); Nova Scotia (2016–2018); Northern Ontario (2019–2020); British Columbia (2026–present)
- Hearts: 2 (2024, 2025)
- Top CTRS ranking: 7th (2023–24)

Calissa Daly (born December 19, 1998, in Pembroke) is a Canadian curler from Ottawa, Ontario. She currently plays second on Team Sarah Daniels.

== Career ==
While in juniors, Daly played in three different provinces. After beginning her career in Ontario, she moved to Nova Scotia while attending Acadia University, forming her own team out of Halifax. At the 2017 Nova Scotia junior championship, her team made it to the final before losing to Kristin Clarke's squad. After failing to reach the playoffs the following year, she moved back to Ontario, joining the Thea Coburn rink at second. This move paid off for Daly as her team of Coburn, Kaelyn Gregory and Alice Holyoke won the 2019 Ontario U-21 Curling Championships, sending them to the 2019 Canadian Junior Curling Championships in Prince Albert, Saskatchewan. At the championship, the team finished in tenth place with a 4–5 record through the round robin and seeding pools. In her final year of juniors, Daly joined the Kira Brunton rink out of Northern Ontario with the team going on to win the provincial title. Representing Northern Ontario at the 2020 Canadian Junior Curling Championships, Daly's rink again missed the playoffs, this time finishing in ninth with a 5–4 record. Also during the 2019–20 season, Team Brunton defeated Cathy Auld in the final of the 2019 Stu Sells Toronto Tankard on the World Curling Tour.

Out of juniors, Daly rejoined Thea Coburn on her team that now included Breanna Rozon. On tour, the team found initial success with a semifinal appearance at the Oakville U25 Kick-off and a quarterfinal finish at the 2021 Oakville Labour Day Classic. Coburn left the rink shortly after and was replaced by Michaela Robert with Daly taking over as skip. In December, the team qualified for the 2022 Ontario Scotties Tournament of Hearts with an undefeated run at the open qualifier. At the provincial championship, Team Daly finished in last place with a 1–6 record, only managing a victory over Lauren Mann. Rozon then took over skipping duties for the team with Daly moving to third. During the 2022–23 season, Team Rozon found little success, only reaching the playoffs in two of six events and failing to qualify for the provincial championship. Daly herself did play in the 2023 Ontario Scotties Tournament of Hearts, however, sparing for Jacqueline Harrison who was dealing with a hip injury. With teammates Allison Flaxey, Lynn Kreviazuk and Laura Hickey, the team went 4–1 in the round robin before losing in a tiebreaker to Danielle Inglis. Also during the 2022–23 season, Daly spared for Paige Papley on Team Selena Sturmay at the 2022 PointsBet Invitational. The team was able to upset Chelsea Carey in the opening round before losing to eventual champions Jennifer Jones in the quarterfinals. Daly left Team Rozon following the season and joined Danielle Inglis' rink at second for the 2023–24 season.

With Team Inglis, Daly found major success, beginning at the Summer Series where the team went undefeated to capture the title. The next month, the team competed in the 2023 PointsBet Invitational, however, lost in the opening round to Kayla Skrlik. In October, the team played in the 2023 Tour Challenge Tier 2 event where they made it to the semifinals before losing out to Kim Eun-jung. After a semifinal finish at the North Grenville Women's Fall Curling Classic, Team Inglis won another tour event at the North Bay Women's Spiel, defeating Hollie Duncan in the final. In the new year, they travelled to Scotland and reached the semifinals of the 2024 Mercure Perth Masters, being knocked out by Clancy Grandy. Entering the 2024 Ontario Scotties Tournament of Hearts as the top seeds, the Inglis rink lost just one game en route to claiming the provincial title, edging out Carly Howard 8–7 in the championship game. This win qualified the team of Inglis, Kira Brunton, Daly and Cassandra de Groot for the 2024 Scotties Tournament of Hearts in Calgary, Alberta, Daly's first appearance at the national women's championship. At the event, the team had mixed results, ultimately finishing seventh in their pool with a 3–5 record.

== Personal life ==
Daly is employed as a policy analyst at Indigenous Services Canada. She previously studied at Laurentian University, Acadia University and Carleton University.

At five years old, Daly was diagnosed with arrhythmogenic right ventricular dysplasia, an inherited heart disease. Her siblings Colton and Camille have also been diagosed.

== Teams ==
Season	Skip	Third	Second	Lead
2014–15	Emma Wallingford	Dayna Cullen	Hannah Wallingford	Calissa Daly
2015–16	Marie-Elaine Little	Calissa Daly	Kelsey Cathcart	Montse De Los Rios
2016–17	Calissa Daly	Raquel Bachman	Mandi Newhook	Emily Manuel
2017–18	Calissa Daly	Kristen Lind	Mandi Newhook	Hailey Silver
2018–19	Thea Coburn	Kaelyn Gregory	Calissa Daly	Alice Holyoke
2019–20	Kira Brunton	Lindsay Dubue	Calissa Daly	Jessica Leonard
2020–21	Thea Coburn	Breanna Rozon	Calissa Daly	Alice Holyoke
2021–22	Calissa Daly	Breanna Rozon	Michaela Robert	Alice Holyoke
2022–23	Breanna Rozon	Calissa Daly	Michaela Robert	Alice Holyoke
2023–24	Danielle Inglis	Kira Brunton	Calissa Daly	Cassandra de Groot
2024–25	Danielle Inglis	Kira Brunton	Calissa Daly	Cassandra de Groot
2025–26	Danielle Inglis	Kira Brunton	Calissa Daly	Cassandra de Groot
2026–27	Sarah Daniels	Abby Ackland	Calissa Daly	Dayna Demmans
