= Kira Brunton =

Canadian curler (born 1999)

- Curler
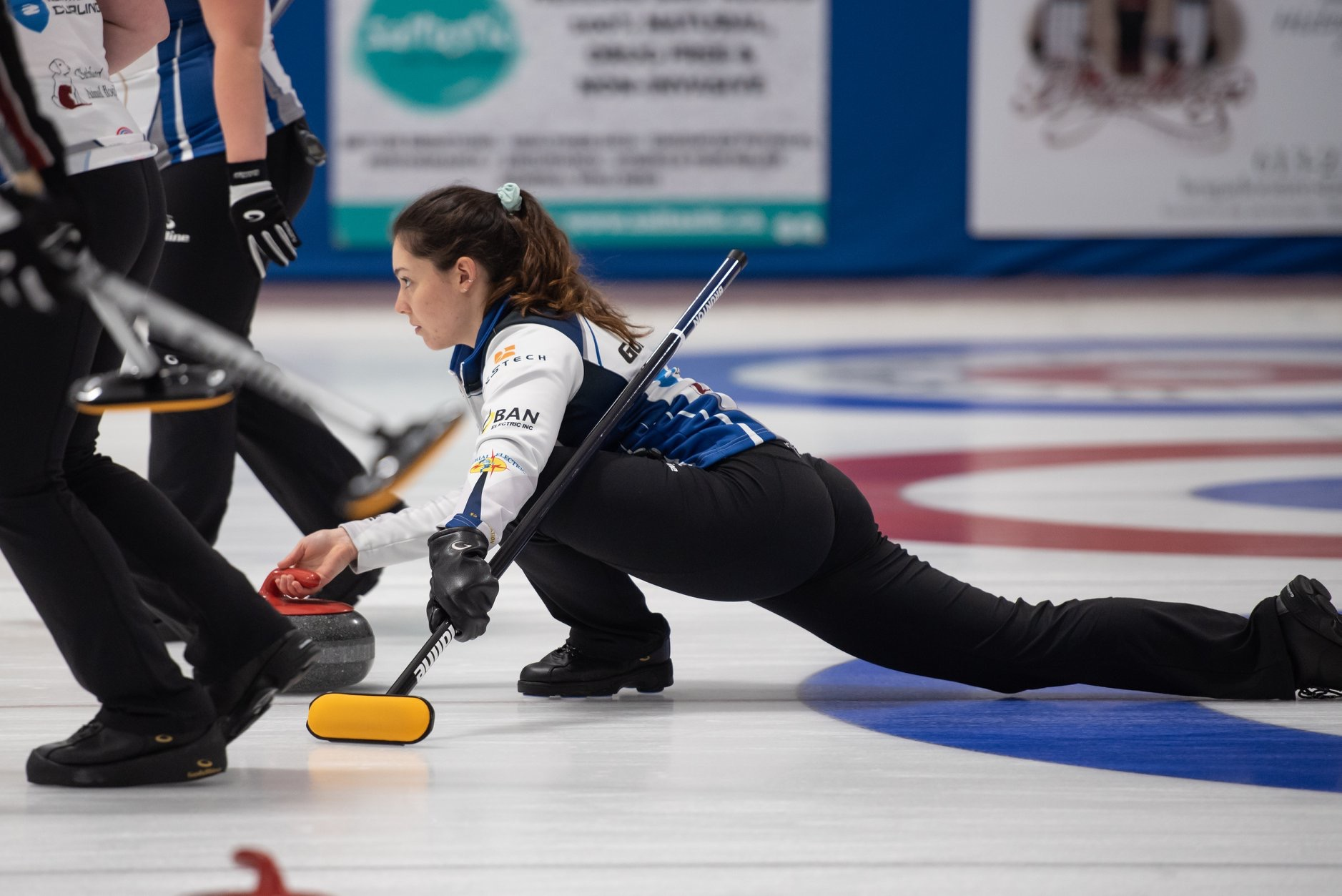
- Brunton at the 2019 Royal LePage Women's Fall Classic
- Born: March 17, 1999 (age 27); Ottawa, Ontario

Team
- Curling club: Ottawa CC, Ottawa, ON
- Skip: Kira Brunton
- Third: Kendra Lilly
- Second: Jamie Smith
- Lead: Lauren Rajala
- Mixed doubles partner: Jacob Horgan

Curling career
- Member Association: Northern Ontario (2013–2020; 2026–present); Ontario (2020–2026)
- Hearts: 4 (2021, 2023, 2024, 2025)
- Top CTRS ranking: 7th (2023–24)
Medal record
Curling
Representing Northern Ontario
Canadian Mixed Doubles Championship
Bronze medal – third place	2025 Summerside
Representing Ontario
Canada Winter Games
Gold medal – first place	2015 Prince George

Kira Michaela Brunton (born March 17, 1999) is a Canadian curler originally from Sudbury, Ontario. She currently skips her own team. In 2015, she won the gold medal at the 2015 Canada Winter Games playing third for Megan Smith.

She coached the Sandy MacEwan rink at the 2026 Montana's Brier.

== Career ==
=== Juniors ===
Brunton made her first national appearance at the 2015 Canada Winter Games where she played third for Megan Smith. After a 6–0 round robin record, they defeated Saskatchewan in the semifinal and Nova Scotia in the final to claim the gold medal. The following season, she qualified for both the 2016 U18 International Curling Championships and the 2016 Canadian Junior Curling Championships. She missed the playoffs at both events. Brunton was more successful at the 2017 Canadian U18 Curling Championships where she led her team of Kate Sherry, Sydnie Stinson and Jessica Leonard to the final where they defeated New Brunswick to claim the title. After not qualifying for any national events during the 2017–18 season, Brunton played in the 2019 Canadian Junior Curling Championships, 2019 U Sports/Curling Canada University Curling Championships and 2019 Canadian Mixed Doubles Curling Championship during the 2018–19 season where she finished 5–5 at the juniors, won the University championships representing Laurentian University and finished 1–6 at the mixed doubles nationals. Also during the 2018–19 season, her team won the Stu Sells Toronto Tankard World Curling Tour event and played in the 2018 Tour Challenge where they lost in a tiebreaker. Brunton won her third provincial junior title the following year and finished with a 5–4 record at the 2020 Canadian Junior Curling Championships. She was also able to defend her title at the Stu Sells Toronto Tankard, defeating Cathy Auld in the final.

=== Women ===
In 2020, Brunton moved to Ottawa, and graduated to women's play, joining the Lauren Mann rink for the 2020–21 season with Cheryl Kreviazuk and Karen Trines at second and lead respectively. The team found immediate success in their first tour event, surprising a short-handed Team Jennifer Jones in the final of the 2020 Stu Sells Toronto Tankard, Brunton's third time winning the event. Brunton competed at the 2021 Scotties Tournament of Hearts, her first Canadian women's curling championship, as alternate for Krysta Burns Northern Ontario rink. At the Hearts, they finished with a 2–6 round robin record, defeating Northwest Territories' Kerry Galusha and Yukon's Laura Eby. Brunton got to play in the team's final game of the tournament, replacing Amanda Gates at lead.

Brunton would then join forces with Danielle Inglis Ottawa-based rink in the 2022–23 curling season, where in their first season together, they would finish 3rd at the 2023 Ontario Scotties Tournament of Hearts. Brunton would still get to participate in the 2023 Scotties Tournament of Hearts as an alternate for Rachel Homan, where they would lose to Nova Scotia's Christina Black 7–6 in the Championship round to finish tied for 5th. The Inglis rink would win their first Ontario Scotties in 2024, beating Carly Howard in the final. This would qualify them to represent Ontario at the 2024 Scotties Tournament of Hearts where they finished with a 3–5 record. Inglis would go on to repeat as Ontario Champions in 2025, returning to the 2025 Scotties Tournament of Hearts. At their second Scotties as a team, the Inglis rink would improve, finishing the round robin with a 6–2 record, qualifying for the Championship round, where they would lose 9–8 to Alberta's Kayla Skrlik.

=== Mixed doubles ===
Brunton joined forces with Jacob Horgan to compete in mixed doubles in the 2024–25 season, competing in the 2025 Canadian Mixed Doubles Curling Championship. In their first national championship together, the duo had success, finishing round robin play with an undefeated 7–0 record, and losing to eventual champions Kadriana Lott and Colton Lott 6–5 in the semifinals, finishing tied for 3rd.

== Personal life ==
Brunton previously attended Laurentian University for sports psychology, and is now a Masters student in counselling psychology at Yorkville University.

== Teams ==
Season	Skip	Third	Second	Lead	Alternate
2013–14	Megan Smith	Kira Brunton	Kate Sherry	Emma Johnson	Mikaela Cheslock
2014–15	Megan Smith	Kira Brunton	Kate Sherry	Emma Johnson	Mikaela Cheslock
2015–16	Megan Smith	Kira Brunton	Kate Sherry	Emma Johnson	Mikaela Cheslock
2016–17	Kira Brunton	Megan Smith	Sara Guy	Kate Sherry	
2017–18	Kira Brunton	Megan Smith	Sara Guy	Kate Sherry	
2018–19	Kira Brunton	Megan Smith	Sara Guy	Kate Sherry	
2019–20	Kira Brunton	Lindsay Dubue	Calissa Daly	Jessica Leonard	
2020–21	Lauren Mann	Kira Brunton	Cheryl Kreviazuk	Karen Trines	
2021–22	Lauren Mann	Kira Brunton	Cheryl Kreviazuk	Karen Trines	Marcia Richardson
2022–23	Danielle Inglis	Kira Brunton	Cheryl Kreviazuk	Cassandra de Groot	
2023–24	Danielle Inglis	Kira Brunton	Calissa Daly	Cassandra de Groot	Kim Tuck (STOH)
2024–25	Danielle Inglis	Kira Brunton	Calissa Daly	Cassandra de Groot	Kim Tuck
2025–26	Danielle Inglis	Kira Brunton	Calissa Daly	Cassandra de Groot	Kim Tuck
2026–27	Kira Brunton	Kendra Lilly	Jamie Smith	Lauren Rajala	
