= Lauren Rajala =

Canadian curler (born 2002)

- Curler
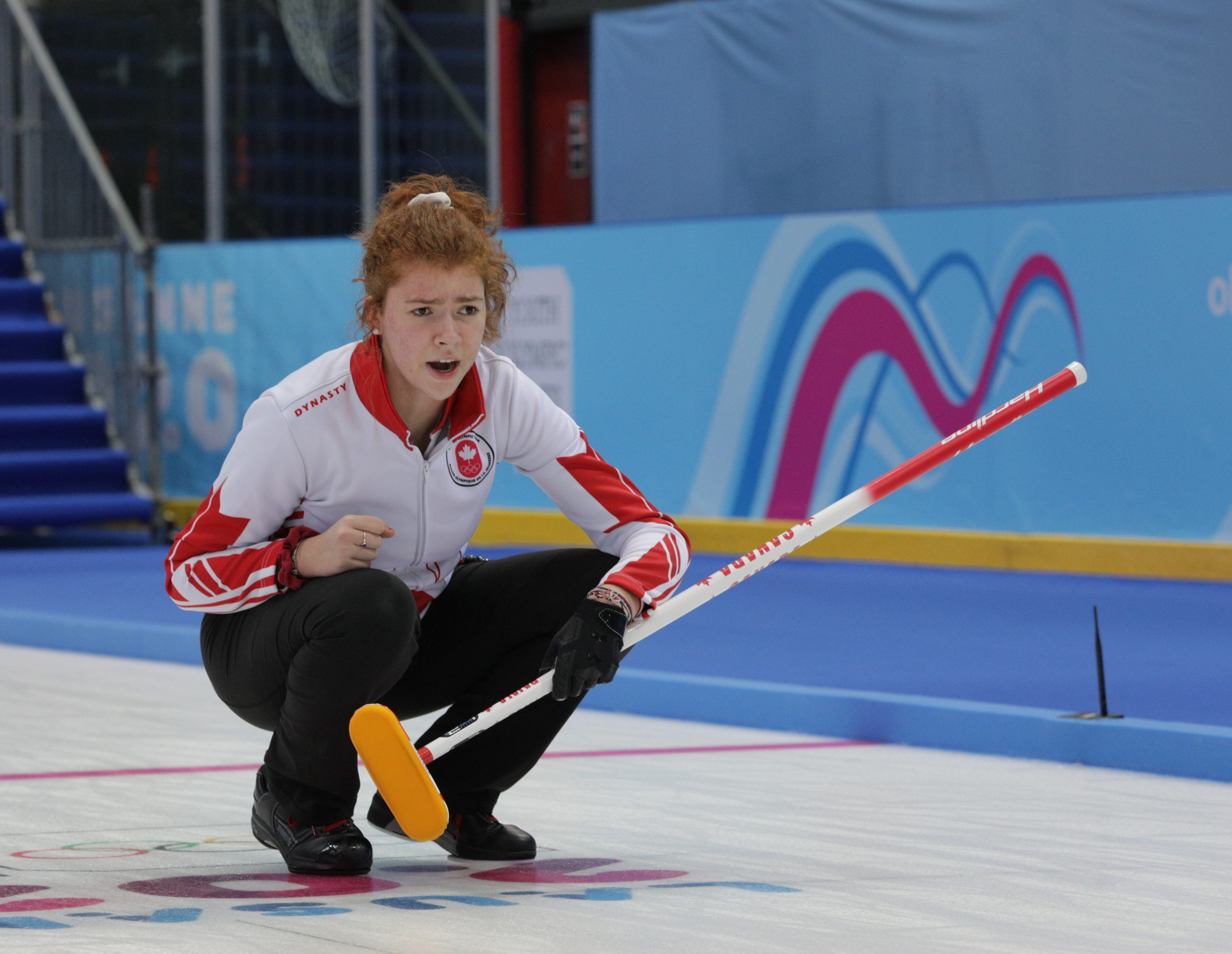
- Born: September 30, 2002 (age 24); Garson, Ontario

Team
- Curling club: Idylwylde G&CC, Sudbury, ON
- Skip: Kira Brunton
- Third: Kendra Lilly
- Second: Jamie Smith
- Lead: Lauren Rajala

Curling career
- Member Association: Northern Ontario (2017–2022; 2026–present); Manitoba (2022–23); Ontario (2023–2026)
- Top CTRS ranking: 17th (2025–26)
Medal record
Women's curling
Representing Ontario
Canada Winter Games
Gold medal – first place	2019 Red Deer

Lauren Rajala (born September 30, 2002 in Garson, Ontario) is a Canadian curler. She currently plays lead on Team Kira Brunton. She was Canada's flag bearer at the 2020 Winter Youth Olympics.

== Early life ==
Rajala began curling at the age of 7 with her father, Brian at the Falconbridge Curling Club.

== Career ==
=== Junior career ===
Rajala is a three-time Northern Ontario U18 champion and a two-time U21 (Junior) champion. She won U18 titles on teams skipped by Bella Croisier in 2018, 2019 and 2020. The Croisier rink also played in the 2018 Northern Ontario Scotties Tournament of Hearts, where they lost all four of their matches. Their win at the 2018 U18 Northern Ontario championship qualified them to represent the region at the 2018 Canadian U18 Curling Championships. There, the team went 4–3. The team had much more success at the 2019 Canadian U18 Curling Championships, going on to win the gold medal. The 2020 event was cancelled due to the COVID-19 pandemic in Ontario. Months before winning the 2019 U18 title, the team represented Ontario at the 2019 Canada Winter Games, where they also won the gold medal.

In May 2019, Rajala was selected to be a member of the Canadian curling team at the 2020 Winter Youth Olympics. She was selected to be Canada's flag bearer in the Opening Ceremonies of the event. The Canadian team, skipped by Nathan Young went 5–0 in group play, but lost in their quarter-final match to Japan, eliminating them from medal competition. In the mixed doubles event, she was paired with Slovenia's Bine Sever. The pair lost their only game, to France's Chana Beitone and Russia's Nikolai Lysakov, who went on to win the silver medal.

Rajala won her first Northern Ontario junior title throwing second stones for Nova Scotian Isabelle Ladouceur in 2021, and then playing second for Manitoba-import Katy Lukowich in 2022 when Lukowich took over the reins. The 2021 Canadian Junior Curling Championships were cancelled that season due to the pandemic, but the team played in the 2021 World Junior Qualification Event later in the year. The team won the event, qualifying them to represent Canada at the 2022 World Junior Curling Championships. There, the team finished with a 3–6 record (9th place), relegating Canada to the World Junior-B Championship for the following season. Playing with Team Lukowich at the 2022 Canadian Junior Curling Championships, the team made it as far as the semifinals where they lost to Ontario 1 (skipped by Emily Deschenes). They then lost in the bronze medal game to Alberta 2.

In 2022, Rajala moved to Winnipeg, Manitoba to be able to continue to play with Lukowich on a junior team that also included Mikaylah Lyburn and Makenna Hadway. While the team was unable to win the Manitoba juniors that season, the team did qualify for the 2023 Manitoba Scotties Tournament of Hearts. There, the team finished with a 2–3 record, missing the playoffs.

=== Women's career ===
After her junior career, Rajala joined the Emma Artichuk rink out of Guelph, Ontario playing third. The team qualified for the 2024 Ontario Scotties Tournament of Hearts, through the open qualifier event. At the provincial championships, the team finished 2–3 record, missing the playoffs.

== Personal life ==
Rajala attended Lasalle Secondary School for high school. As of 2022, she attended Laurentian University, where she took Forensic Science. Her U18 and Canada Winter Games gold medallist teams were inducted into the Greater Sudbury Sports Hall of Fame as "team of the year" in 2019.
