= Isabelle Ladouceur =

Canadian curler (born 2000)

- Curler
- Born: October 17, 2000 (age 26); St. Catharines, Ontario

Team
- Curling club: Lakeshore CC, Lower Sackville
- Skip: Isabelle Ladouceur
- Third: Cally Moore
- Second: Emilie Proulx
- Lead: Isabel Reeves

Curling career
- Member Association: Nova Scotia (2015–2019; 2025–present); Ontario (2019–2021; 2022–2025); Northern Ontario (2021–2022)
- Top CTRS ranking: 9th (2022–23)

Isabelle Ladouceur (born October 17, 2000) is a Canadian curler. She is a former Canadian U18 champion, and skipped the Canadian junior team at the 2022 World Junior Curling Championships.

== Career ==
=== Junior ===
Ladouceur played in the 2016 Nova Scotia Junior Championships, losing in the final to Mary Fay. At the 2017 and 2018 provincial juniors, her team failed to make the playoffs.

In 2018, Ladouceur and her U-18 team of Emilie Proulx, Makayla Harnish, Elsa Nauss and Kate Callaghan became the youngest ever team to qualify for the Nova Scotia Scotties Tournament of Hearts, as the age limit was eliminated two years prior. At the 2018 Nova Scotia Scotties Tournament of Hearts, the team went win less, going 0–7. A few months later, the team represented Nova Scotia at the 2018 Canadian U18 Curling Championships. The team beat Saskatchewan 4–3 in the final to claim the championship. In 2019, her team lost in the Nova Scotia Junior final to Kaitlyn Jones.

Ladouceur moved to Ontario to attend Wilfrid Laurier University. She played in the 2020 Ontario Junior Championships, going 3–4 in her first Ontario junior provincial. Later that season she skipped Laurier and teammates Brooklyn Fahl, Emma McKenzie and Kelly Middaugh at the 2020 U Sports/Curling Canada University Curling Championships, finishing with a 2–5 record.

She competed for Northern Ontario at the 2021 World Junior Qualification Event, which she won. Her team only consisted of two Northern Ontarians, Jamie Smith and Lauren Rajala from Sudbury, the rest of the team hailed from different provinces. Ladouceur herself was from Nova Scotia, lead Katie Shaw was from Prince Edward Island and alternate Katy Lukowich was from Manitoba. In the qualification event final, she defeated Alberta's Elysa Crough rink, 7–6. The event replaced that year's Canadian Junior Curling Championships which were cancelled due to the COVID-19 pandemic. This qualified her rink to represent Canada at the 2022 World Junior Curling Championships. The team finished in 9th place, relegating Canada to the World Junior-B Championship for the following season.

=== Women's ===
Ladouceur had a strong season in 2022–23, her first season after graduating from the junior ranks. Her team, which consists of Smith, Grace Lloyd and Rachel Steele won the North Grenville Curling Club Women's Fall Classic, the Stroud Sleeman Cash Spiel and the Gord Carroll Curling Classic events on the tour. The team also played in their first Grand Slam of Curling event at the 2023 Canadian Open. They lost all three of their games in the triple knockout event. In 2023, they also qualified for their first Ontario Scotties Tournament of Hearts, going 2–3. That season, Ladouceur also skipped Laurier at the 2022 World University Games Qualifier. She led her rink of Smith, Middaugh and Emma McKenzie to a 1–4 record. By virtue of winning the North Grenville Fall Classic, the Ladouceur women's rink qualified for the season ending Champions Cup Grand Slam event. There, the team finished 1–4.

The Ladouceur rink played in the 2023 PointsBet Invitational event, put on by Curling Canada. The team won their first round game against Serena Gray-Withers, but lost in the second round to Rachel Homan. The team played in the 2024 Ontario Scotties Tournament of Hearts, where they qualified for the playoffs, before losing to Chelsea Brandwood rink in the C1 vs C2 game.

Ladouceur announced at the end of the 2024-25 season that she would be returning to Nova Scotia, and skipping a new team alongside Cally Moore, Emilie Proulx, and Isabel Reeves.

== Personal life ==
Ladouceur's hometown is Bedford, Nova Scotia. She went to Charles P. Allen High School and attended Wilfrid Laurier University, where she took Psychology & Neuroscience.

== Grand Slam record ==
Key
C	Champion
F	Lost in Final
SF	Lost in Semifinal
QF	Lost in Quarterfinals
R16	Lost in the round of 16
Q	Did not advance to playoffs
T2	Played in Tier 2 event
DNP	Did not participate in event
N/A	Not a Grand Slam event that season

Event	2022–23	2023–24
Tour Challenge	DNP	T2
Canadian Open	Q	DNP
Champions Cup	Q	N/A
