= Cassandra de Groot =

Canadian curler (born 1988)

- Curler
- Born: April 5, 1988 (age 38); Sudbury, Ontario

Team
- Curling club: Ottawa Hunt & GC, Ottawa, Ontario

Curling career
- Member Association: Ontario
- Hearts: 2 (2024, 2025)
- Top CTRS ranking: 7th (2023–24)

Cassandra de Groot (born April 5, 1988) is a Canadian curler from Ottawa.

== Early life ==
Born in Sudbury, Ontario, de Groot grew up in Collingwood, where she began curling at the age of 7 at the Collingwood Curling Club. In 2000, her family moved to Stayner, where she curled out of the Stayner Granite Club. She moved to Ottawa in 2006 for university, where she began to curl competitively, while playing out of the Ottawa Curling Club.

In 2019, she briefly returned to Collingwood to join her mother at her wealth management practice, before returning to Ottawa.

== Career ==
de Groot was a member of the Katie Morrissey junior rink which made it to the finals of the 2009 Ontario Junior Championships, where they lost to Rachel Homan. That year, she was also the runner-up at the Ontario Junior Mixed Championship. Playing for a team skipped by Christian Tolusso, her team lost to Mark Kean in the final. Following juniors, de Groot played four more years curling with Morrissey, before joining the Danielle Inglis rink in 2014, first playing second, then moving to lead in 2017. With Team Inglis, she played in her first provincial women's championship in 2015, where they went 3–6. The team did not qualify for provincials again until 2018. There, they made it all the way to the final before losing to Hollie Duncan. The team qualified again in 2020, where the team were eliminated by Duncan again, this time in the semifinals.

The team played in the 2021 Canadian Olympic Curling Pre-Trials, hoping to represent Canada at the 2022 Winter Olympics. There, the team finished with a 2–4 record. At the next provincials, held in 2022, Team Inglis missed the playoffs, finishing with a round robin record of 3–4.

The team lost to Duncan in the semifinals again at the 2023 Ontario Scotties Tournament of Hearts. Later that year, the team played in the 2023 PointsBet Invitational, where they lost in the "Sweep 16" to Kayla Skrlik. In 2024, the team finally won the Ontario championship, beating Carly Howard in the final. The team then represented Ontario at the 2024 Scotties Tournament of Hearts, Canada's national women's curling championship. There, the team finished pool play with a 3–5 record, missing the playoffs. Later that year, the team played in the 2024 PointsBet Invitational, where the team lost to Skrlik again in the Sweep 16. Later that season, the team played in the 2025 WFG Masters Grand Slam of Curling event. There, the team went 2–2 in pool play, before losing to Team Momoha Tabata in a tiebreaker.

At the 2025 Ontario Women's Curling Championship, Team Inglis won their second straight provincial title, this time beating Chelsea Brandwood in the final. The team then represented Ontario at the 2025 Scotties Tournament of Hearts, where they finished pool play with a 6–2 record. This put them in the championship round, where they were eliminated by Alberta's Kayla Skrlik.

The team played in the 2025 Canadian Olympic Curling Pre-Trials, where they finished with a 4–3 record, just missing the playoffs.

== Personal life ==
de Groot works as an associate wealth and investor advisor for Cotter Wealth Management of RBC Dominion Securities, whom she joined in 2013. She is married to fellow curler Gary Rowe, and has two stepsons. She graduated from the University of Ottawa in 2010 with a Bachelors degree in Health Science.
