= Stroud Sleeman Cash Spiel =

Annual curling tournament in Stroud, Ontario, Canada

- Established: 2005
- Host city: Stroud, Ontario
- Arena: Stroud Curling Club
- Men's purse: $6,250
- Women's purse: $8,500

Current champions (2026)
- Men: (Ontario) Sandy MacEwan
- Women: (Ontario) Sherry Middaugh

Location in Canada

The Stroud Sleeman Cashspiel is an annual bonspiel, or curling tournament. It takes place at the Stroud Curling Club in Stroud, Ontario. The tournament has been held as part of the men's and women's Ontario Curling Tour, and included on the World Curling Tour from 2013 to 2019.

== Past champions ==
Only skip's name is displayed.

=== Men ===
Year	Winning skip	Runner up skip	Purse (CAD)
2005	(Ontario) Kirk Ziola		
2006	(Ontario) Cary Luner		
2007	(Ontario) Kirk Ziola		
2008	(Ontario) Terry Corbin		
2010	(Ontario) John Epping	(Ontario) Garth Mitchell	$18,300
2011	(Ontario) Jake Higgs	(Ontario) Darryl Shane	$20,200
2012	(Ontario) Joe Frans	(Ontario) Greg Balsdon	$15,000
2013	(Ontario) Greg Balsdon	(United States) Heath McCormick	$15,000
2014	(Ontario) Colin Dow	(Ontario) Scott McDonald	$11,000
2015	(Ontario) Codey Maus	(Denmark) Rasmus Stjerne	$12,380
2016	(Ontario) Chad Allen	(Ontario) Colin Dow	$12,380
2017	(Ontario) Wayne Tuck Jr.	(Ontario) Brandon Tippin	$12,380
2018	(Ontario) John Willsey	(Ontario) Cory Heggestad	$12,200
2019	(Ontario) Sandy MacEwan	(Ontario) Jason Camm	$14,000
2020	Cancelled		
2021	Cancelled		
2022	(Switzerland) Yannick Schwaller	(Ontario) Pat Ferris	$11,200
2023	(Ontario) Pat Ferris	(Ontario) Jayden King	$12,800
2024	(Ontario) Landan Rooney	(Ontario) Jacob Lamb	$12,800
2025	(Ontario) Michael Fournier	(Ontario) Christopher Inglis	$6,250
2026	(Ontario) Sandy MacEwan	(Ontario) Scott Foster	$6,250

=== Women ===
Year	Winning skip	Runner up skip	Purse (CAD)
2012	(Ontario) Julie Hastings	(Ontario) Shawnessy Johnson	$2,000
2013	(Ontario) Heather Graham	(Ontario) Julie Hastings	$6,000
2014	(Ontario) Julie Hastings	(Ontario) Sherry Middaugh	$6,000
2015	(Ontario) Julie Tippin	(Ontario) Allison Flaxey	$7,425
2016	(Ontario) Julie Tippin	(Ontario) Megan Balsdon	$7,425
2017	(Ontario) Susan Froud	(Ontario) Ashley Waye	$7,425
2018	(Ontario) Jaimee Gardner	(Ontario) Kirsten Marshall	$7,200
2019	(Quebec) Julie Tippin	(Ontario) Krista McCarville	$10,500
2020	Cancelled		
2021	Cancelled		
2022	(Ontario) Isabelle Ladouceur	(Ontario) Krysta Burns	$11,200
2023	(Ontario) Heather Heggestad	(Ontario) Carly Howard	$12,800
2024	(Ontario) Shelley Hardy	(Ontario) Chelsea Brandwood	$12,800
2025	(Ontario) Chelsea Principi	(Ontario) Lauren Mann	$6,250
2026	(Ontario) Sherry Middaugh	(Ontario) Chelsea Principi	$8,500
