= Gord Carroll Curling Classic =

World Curling Tour event

- Established: 2008
- Host city: Whitby, Ontario
- Arena: Whitby Curling Club
- Purse: $13,600

Current champions (2022)
- Men: (United States) Luc Violette
- Women: (Ontario) Isabelle Ladouceur

The Gord Carroll Curling Classic (formerly the Mount Lawn Gord Carroll Classic and the Village of Taunton Mills Gord Carroll Curling Classic) is an annual bonspiel, or curling tournament, that takes place at the Whitby Curling Club in Whitby, Ontario.

The tournament began as part of the men's and women's Ontario Curling Tour, and was later included in the World Curling Tour starting in 2013. In 2015, the men's event was discontinued, but brought back in 2022. It was not held in 2016 or 2020.

== Past champions ==
=== Women ===
Only skip's name is displayed.

Year	Winning team	Runner-up team	Purse (CAD)
2008	(Ontario) Angie Melaney		
2010	(Ontario) Alison Goring	(Ontario) Susan McKnight	$6,000
2011	(Ontario) Lauren Mann	(Ontario) Laura Crocker	$7,200
2012	(Ontario) Jill Mouzar	(Ontario) Jacqueline Harrison	$7,500
2013	(Ontario) Julie Hastings	(Ontario) Laura Payne	$7,500
2014	(Ontario) Susan McKnight	(Ontario) Sherry Middaugh	$10,000
2015	(Ontario) Jacqueline Harrison	(Ontario) Mallory Kean	$10,000
2017	(Ontario) Tracy Fleury	(Sweden) Isabella Wranå	$8,500
2018	(Ontario) Chelsea Brandwood	(South Korea) Gim Un-chi	$15,100
2019	(Switzerland) Irene Schori	(Ontario) Julie Hastings	$15,100
2020	Cancelled		
2021	(Ontario) Jestyn Murphy	(Ontario) Lauren Mann	$8,000
2022	(Ontario) Isabelle Ladouceur	(Ontario) Lauren Mann	$13,600

=== Men ===
Only skip's name is displayed.

Year	Winning team	Runner-up team	Purse (CAD)
2008	(Ontario) Pat Duggan		
2010	(Ontario) John Epping	(Ontario) Cory Heggestad	$22,000
2011	(Ontario) Peter Corner	(Ontario) Wayne Tuck, Jr.	$23,000
2012	(Ontario) Glenn Howard	(Ontario) Mark Kean	$20,000
2013	(Ontario) Wayne Tuck, Jr.	(Ontario) Craig Kochan	$20,000
2014	(Ontario) John Epping	(Ontario) Chris Gardner	$16,000
2022	(United States) Luc Violette	(Ontario) Sam Mooibroek	$13,600
