= Susan Froud =

Canadian curler

- Curler
- Born: March 31, 1970 (age 56); Newmarket, Ontario, Canada

Team
- Curling club: Alliston CC, Alliston, ON
- Skip: Susan Froud
- Third: Kerry Lackie
- Second: Kristin Turcotte
- Lead: Julie McMullin
- Alternate: Jo-Ann Rizzo

Curling career
- Member Association: Ontario
- Other appearances: World Senior Championship: 1 (2024)
Medal record
Curling
World Senior Curling Championships
| Gold medal – first place | 2024 Östersund |

Susan Froud (born March 31, 1970, in Newmarket, Ontario) is a Canadian curler from Loretto, Ontario.

== Career ==
Froud won a provincial university championship with the University of Waterloo in 1996.

Froud played in the inaugural Canada Cup of Curling in 2003, playing second for the Marilyn Bodogh rink. Bodogh did not play in the event, so the team was skipped by Penny Shantz. The team finished the event with a 1–3 record, missing the playoffs.

Froud played in the Canada Cup again in 2005, playing second for Anne Merklinger. The team finished first in their pool with a 4–1 record, but lost both of their playoff games, settling for third place.

During her World Curling Tour career, Froud played for several skips, including Merklinger, Janet McGhee, Jacqueline Harrison and Susan McKnight.

Over the course of her career, Froud has won the 2004 OVCT RCMP Fall Open, the 2005 Gananoque Cash Spiel (with Merklinger) and the 2010 Brampton Curling Classic (with McKnight). In 2017, Froud won the Stroud Sleeman Cash Spiel as a skip. She played in her first Grand Slam event at the 2007 Sobeys Slam with McGhee, but the team missed the playoffs. In 2020, she won the KW Fall Classic.

Froud played in her first Ontario Scotties Tournament of Hearts in 2008, playing second for McGhee. The team finished in 4th place. She returned in 2010 playing second for Harrison, and the team finished in third place. Froud made it again in 2011 playing third for McKnight. Again, her team reached the playoffs, settling for fourth place. Froud won her fourth provincial championship in 2013 playing second for Harrison again. This was the first tournament where her team missed the playoffs, as they finished with a 3–6 record, tied for 8th place. She played in her fifth provincial in 2015, playing third for Harrison. The team made the playoffs again, but settled for fourth place. Froud made her sixth provincial appearance in 2019, playing third on a rink skipped by Lauren Horton. The team finished in seventh place with a 2–5 record. Froud again made it to provincials in 2020, skipping her own team again. There, she finished the round robin with a 3–5 record, tied for fifth place. Froud qualified for the postponed 2022 Ontario Hearts, leading her team to a 3–4 record. Froud again qualified in 2023, leading her team to a 2–3 record.

In 2018, Froud won the Ontario Intermediate Women's Championship for curlers over 40.

In 2023, she won the Ontario Senior Women's Championship, sending her team to represent Ontario at the 2023 Canadian Senior Curling Championships. There, she led her team of Kerry Lackie, Kristin Turcotte, Julie McMullin to her first national championship, winning the event. They went on to represent Canada at the 2024 World Senior Curling Championships, going undefeated in the event and won the gold medal, winning 7-3 in the final against Lithuania (Virginija Paulauskaitė).

== Personal life ==
In addition to attending Waterloo, Froud also attended McGill University and Bradford District High School. She works as an engineer / consultant for SNC-Lavalin Environment.
