= Jamie Smith (curler) =

Canadian curler (born 2001)

- Curler
- Born: February 14, 2001 (age 25); Sudbury, Ontario

Team
- Curling club: Dundas Valley Golf and Curling Club, Dundas, ON
- Skip: Kira Brunton
- Third: Kendra Lilly
- Second: Jamie Smith
- Lead: Lauren Rajala

Curling career
- Member Association: Northern Ontario (2017–2022; 2024–present); Ontario (2022–2024)
- Other appearances: CJCC: 1 (2022)
- Top CTRS ranking: 9th (2022–23)
Medal record
Women's curling
Representing Ontario
Canada Winter Games
| Gold medal – first place | 2019 Red Deer |
Representing Northern Ontario
2021 World Junior Qualification Event
| Gold medal – first place | 2021 Saskatoon |

Jamie Smith (born February 14, 2001) is a Canadian curler from Sudbury, Ontario. She currently plays second on Team Kira Brunton. In 2022, she played third for the Canadian junior team at the 2022 World Junior Curling Championships.

== Career ==
=== Juniors ===
Smith made her first national appearance at the 2018 Canadian U18 Curling Championships after posting an 8–0 record at the 2018 U18 Northern Ontario Girls Provincial with the Bella Croisier rink. The rink would go on to post a 4–2 round robin record, but would fail to carry momentum into the championship round and would drop their next two games, missing the playoffs.

In 2019 Smith would once again reach the national stage this time at the 2019 Canada Winter Games. After finishing first in the round robin with a 9–1 record, the rink would advance directly to the semi-final where they would defeat Nova Scotia's Cally Moore 6–5 and then go on to capture the gold medal after defeating Manitoba's Hayley Bergman 8–3. In the same year, Smith would go on to win back-to-back provincial titles, capturing the 2019 U18 Northern Ontario Girls Provincial and qualifying for the 2019 Canadian U18 Curling Championships. The rink would once again advance to the championship round after a 5–1 round robin record, this time reaching the playoffs and defeating New Brunswick's Melodie Forsythe 7–4 in the semi-final and Ontario's Emily Deschenes 6–2 in the final to win the gold medal.

=== Mixed ===
Smith would play lead on the Ontario team that was skipped by Sam Mooibroek at the 2025 Canadian Mixed Curling Championship, alongside Emma Artichuk and Wyatt Small. At the national championships, Ontario would finish second after losing to New Brunswick's Rene Comeau 6–5 in the final.

== Personal life ==
Smith is currently a Financial Mathematics student at Wilfrid Laurier University.

== Teams ==
| Season | Skip | Third | Second | Lead |
|---|---|---|---|---|
| 2017–18 | Bella Croisier | Jamie Smith | Lauren Rajala | Piper Croisier |
| 2018–19 | Bella Croisier | Jamie Smith | Piper Croisier | Lauren Rajala |
| 2019–20 | Bella Croisier | Jamie Smith | Emilie Lovitt | Piper Croisier |
| 2020–21 | Isabelle Ladouceur | Jamie Smith | Kelly Middaugh | Katie Shaw |
| 2021–22 | Isabelle Ladouceur | Jamie Smith | Lauren Rajala | Katie Shaw |
| 2022–23 | Isabelle Ladouceur | Jamie Smith | Grace Lloyd | Rachel Steele |
| 2023–24 | Isabelle Ladouceur | Grace Lloyd | Jamie Smith | Rachel Steele |
| 2024–25 | Emma Artichuk | Megan Smith | Jamie Smith | Lauren Rajala |
| 2025–26 | Emma Artichuk | Jamie Smith | Evelyn Robert | Lauren Rajala |
| 2026–27 | Kira Brunton | Kendra Lilly | Jamie Smith | Lauren Rajala |
