= Carly Howard =

Canadian curler

- Curler
- Born: October 7, 1993 (age 33); Midland, Ontario

Team
- Curling club: High Park Club, Toronto
- Skip: Carly Howard
- Third: Grace Holyoke
- Second: Emma Artichuk
- Lead: Alice Holyoke

Curling career
- Member Association: Ontario (2010–2016; 2019–present); Saskatchewan (2016–2019)
- Top CTRS ranking: 21st (2022–23)

Carly Howard (born October 7, 1993 in Midland, Ontario) is a Canadian curler from Tiny, Ontario. She currently skips her own team out of Toronto. She is the daughter of four-time World curling champion and four-time Brier champion Glenn Howard.

== Curling career ==
After winning the 2010 Ontario Bantam Mixed Championship, Howard found much of her early success in university curling, winning her first Ontario University Athletics (OUA) title in 2014 for the Wilfrid Laurier Golden Hawks, defeating the Carleton Ravens team, skipped by Jamie Sinclair in the final. Her team of Cheryl Kreviazuk, Evangeline Fortier and Kerilynn Mathers went on to represent Laurier at the 2014 CIS/CCA Curling Championships, where they lost to the same Carleton rink in the semifinal. She won a second straight OUA title in 2015, when she defeated the Brock Badgers in the final. Her team of Mathers, Fortier and Chelsea Brandwood went on to win the bronze medal at the 2015 CIS/CCA Curling Championships.

Howard joined the Cathy Auld team at lead position in 2014. The team found some early success together, winning the Royal LePage Women's Fall Classic World Curling Tour event in November of that year. The team played in the 2014 Curlers Corner Autumn Gold Curling Classic Grand Slam of Curling event that season, losing all three of their games. That season, she also played in the 2015 Canadian Mixed Doubles Curling Trials with her father Glenn. The pair went 5–2 in pool play, and went on to lose in the quarter-final. They had been ranked in first place on Curling Canada's Order of Merit ranking going into the event.

The following season, Howard joined the Mallory Kean rink at third position. Howard played in her first Ontario Scotties Tournament of Hearts provincial women's championship for Kean in 2016. There, the team finished with a 2–7 record.

Starting in the 2016-17 curling season, Howard joined her cousin Ashley's Regina, Saskatchewan based rink, playing third on the team. Carly was the team's "import" player, as she was living in Toronto at the time. The team played at the 2018 Saskatchewan Scotties Tournament of Hearts, where they finished with a 3–5 record. The team played in the 2019 Saskatchewan Scotties Tournament of Hearts as well, but went 2–6.

In 2019, Howard returned to play for an Ontario based team, playing third for the Lauren Horton rink for one season, before joining the Jestyn Murphy rink in 2020. The team played in the 2021 Canadian Olympic Curling Pre-Trials, where they finished pool play with a 2–4 record. The team would later qualify for the 2022 Ontario Scotties Tournament of Hearts, which was postponed to April that year due to the COVID-19 pandemic in Ontario. At the Ontario Hearts, Howard skipped the team, with Murphy playing lead instead. The team, which also consisted of Stephanie Matheson and Grace Holyoke went 5–2 in the round robin. They beat Team Hollie Duncan (skipped by Sherry Middaugh) in the semifinals, before losing to Rachel Homan in the final. In 2023, the Murphy team disbanded and Howard soon formed her own team, alongside Allison Flaxey, Lynn Kreviazuk, and Laura Hickey. They qualified for the 2024 Ontario Scotties Tournament of Hearts, where they lost to Team Danielle Inglis 7–8 in the final.

Katelyn Wasylkiw replaced Flaxey at third for the 2024–25 curling season.

== Personal life ==
Howard works as a human resources assistant at Bay Street HR.
