= Chelsea Principi =

Canadian curler (born 1995)

- Curler
- Born: July 15, 1995 (age 31); Beamsville, Ontario

Team
- Curling club: Niagara Falls CC, Niagara Falls
- Skip: Chelsea Principi
- Third: Lauren Peskett
- Second: Brenda Chapman
- Lead: Keira McLaughlin

Curling career
- Member Association: Ontario

Chelsea Principi (née Brandwood; born July 15, 1995) is a Canadian curler from St. Catharines, Ontario. She currently skips a team on the World Curling Tour. Her hometown is Beamsville, Ontario.

== Career ==
=== Juniors ===
Principi's first provincial title came at the women's bantam championship in 2012.

Principi won the Ontario Junior women's championship in 2015, with teammates Claire Greenlees, Brenda Holloway and Danielle Greenlees. The team represented Ontario at the 2015 Canadian Junior Curling Championships. Principi led her rink to a 7-3 record, after the round robin tournament. In the playoffs, she beat British Columbia's Corryn Brown team, before losing in the final to Alberta's Kelsey Rocque.

In university curling, Principi played for the Laurier Golden Hawks, where she won three straight provincial (OUA) titles from 2014 to 2016, but came up short in 2017, her fourth year of eligibility. She was the alternate for the Laurier team (skipped by Carly Howard) at the 2014 CIS/CCA Curling Championships, where they finished third. At the 2015 CIS/CCA Curling Championships, she was the lead on the team, and won another bronze medal. At the 2016 CIS/CCA Curling Championships, she was the skip of the team, but they missed the playoffs.

Principi then attended Niagara College, skipping their women's team to a provincial college title in 2018. She represented Niagara at the 2018 CCAA Curling National Championships, where she led her team to a 4-3 record.

=== Women's ===
Principi won her first World Curling Tour event at the 2018 Gord Carroll Curling Classic, defeating South Korea's Gim Un-chi in the final. Later that season, Principi qualified for her first provincial women's championship, the 2019 Ontario Scotties Tournament of Hearts. In 2020, her team competed at the 2020 Ontario Scotties Tournament of Hearts where they finished with a 1-7 record. In 2022, Principi won the Home Again Curling Classic bonspiel, and qualified for the 2023 Ontario Scotties Tournament of Hearts, where they went 1–4.

In the 2026–27 curling season, Principi would form a new team where they would find immediate success, winning the Grand Slam of Curling Satellite event at the 2026 Swiss Chalet Women's Curling Stadium Spiel by going undefeated in the event and beating South Korea's Kim Kyeong-ae 10–3 in the final. This qualified Team Principi for their first official Grand Slam at the 2026 GSOC Open.

== Grand Slam record ==
Key
C	Champion
F	Lost in Final
SF	Lost in Semifinal
QF	Lost in Quarterfinals
R16	Lost in the round of 16
Q	Did not advance to playoffs
T2	Played in Tier 2 event
DNP	Did not participate in event
N/A	Not a Grand Slam event that season

Event	2026–27
Open	
