= 2014 Stu Sells Oakville Tankard =

- Host city: Oakville, Ontario
- Arena: Oakville Curling Club
- Dates: September 4–7
- Men's winner: (Manitoba) Mike McEwen
- Curling club: Fort Rouge CC, Winnipeg
- Skip: Mike McEwen
- Third: B. J. Neufeld
- Second: Matt Wozniak
- Lead: Denni Neufeld
- Finalist: (Ontario) John Epping
- Women's winner: (Switzerland) Silvana Tirinzoni
- Curling club: CC Aarau, Aarau
- Skip: Silvana Tirinzoni
- Third: Manuela Siegrist
- Second: Esther Neuenschwander
- Lead: Marlene Albrecht
- Finalist: (Switzerland) Alina Pätz

The 2014 Stu Sells Oakville Tankard was held from September 4 to 7 at the Oakville Curling Club in Oakville, Ontario as part of the 2014–15 World Curling Tour. It was held on the second week of the Tour and was the first event (along with the Good Times Bonspiel) of the Women's Curling Tour. It was also the first event of the Ontario Curling Tour season and acted as the Ontario Curling Tour championship of the previous season. Both the men's and women's event were held in a round robin format, and the purses for the men's and women's events were CAD$30,000 and CAD$24,000, respectively.

Mike McEwen and his rink from Winnipeg became the first team from outside of Ontario to win the men's event, defeating Toronto's John Epping rink in the final. On the women's side, it was an all-Swiss final, with Silvana Tirinzoni's rink defeating her compatriot, Alina Pätz in the final. It was the second time a team from outside Ontario won the event, and the first time that no Ontario rink made it to the final.

== Men ==
=== Teams ===
The teams are listed as follows:

Skip	Third	Second	Lead	Locale
Greg Balsdon	Mark Bice	Tyler Morgan	Jamie Farnell	Hamilton, Ontario
Don Bowser	Jonathan Beuk	Wesley Forget	Scott Chadwick	Ottawa, Ontario
Matt Dupuis (fourth)	Dan Cook	Ian Bridger	Doug Brewer (skip)	Cornwall, Ontario
Reid Carruthers	Braeden Moskowy	Derek Samagalski	Colin Hodgson	Winnipeg, Manitoba
Adam Casey	Josh Barry	Anson Carmody	Robbie Doherty	Charlottetown, Prince Edward Island
Peter Corner	Graeme McCarrel	Codey Maus	Craig Kochan	Toronto, Ontario
Robert Desjardins	Louis Biron	Frederic Lawton	Maurice Cayouette	Chicoutimi, Quebec
Niklas Edin	Oskar Eriksson	Kristian Lindström	Christoffer Sundgren	Karlstad, Sweden
Greg Eigner	Benjamin Levy	Marcus Gleaton	Bret Jackson	(United States) Fort Wayne, Indiana
John Epping	Travis Fanset	Patrick Janssen	Tim March	Toronto, Ontario
Joe Frans	Craig Van Ymeren	Bowie Abbis-Mills	Jeff Gorda	Guelph, Ontario
Chris Gardner	Mike McLean	Terry Scharf	Steve Forrest	Ottawa, Ontario
Rayad Husain	Owen Duhaime	Kevin Hawkshaw	Jess Bechard	Haliburton, Ontario
Mike Jakubo	Jordan Chandler	Sandy MacEwan	Lee Toner	Sudbury, Ontario
Josh Johnston	Wes Johnson	Matt Lowe	Ryan Parker	Toronto, Ontario
Mark Kean	Mathew Camm	David Mathers	Scott Howard	Toronto, Ontario
Richard Krell	Ben Bevan	Carter Adair	Danny Dow	Kitchener, Ontario
William Lyburn	Richard Daneault	Andrew Irving	Daniel Gagne	Winnipeg, Manitoba
Paul Madgett	Rob Melhuish	Don Pearson	Al Kirchner	Oakville, Ontario
Mike McEwen	B.J. Neufeld	Matt Wozniak	Denni Neufeld	Winnipeg, Manitoba
Jean-Michel Ménard	Martin Crête	Éric Sylvain	Philippe Ménard	Saint-Romuald, Quebec
David Murdoch	Greg Drummond	Scott Andrews	Michael Goodfellow	Stirling, Scotland
Darryl Prebble	Dale Matchett	Denis Belanger	Dennis Lemon	Toronto, Ontario
Brent Ross	Ryan Werenich	Andrew Clayton	Shawn Kaufman	Harriston, Ontario
Robert Rumfeldt	Adam Spencer	Brad Kidd	Jake Higgs	Guelph, Ontario
John Shuster	Tyler George	Matt Hamilton	Trevor Host	(United States) Duluth, Minnesota
Aaron Squires	Matt Mapletoft	Spencer Nuttall	Fraser Reid	Waterloo, Ontario
Wayne Tuck, Jr.	Chad Allen	Connor Duhaime	Chris Jay	Brantford, Ontario
Brock Virtue	Charley Thomas	Brandon Klassen	D. J. Kidby	Calgary, Alberta
Jake Walker	Dayna Deruelle	Andrew McGaugh	Michael McGaugh	Brampton, Ontario

=== Round Robin Standings ===
Key
Teams to Playoffs

Pool A	W	L
(Quebec) Jean-Michel Ménard	3	1
(Quebec) Robert Desjardins	3	1
(Ontario) Brent Ross	2	2
(Ontario) Josh Johnston	1	3
(Ontario) Robert Rumfeldt	1	3

Pool D	W	L
(Manitoba) Mike McEwen	4	0
(Ontario) Mark Kean	3	1
(Ontario) Joe Frans	2	2
(Ontario) Aaron Squires	1	3
(Ontario) Rayad Husain	0	4

Pool B	W	L
(Ontario) Darryl Prebble	4	0
(Sweden) Niklas Edin	3	1
(Alberta) Brock Virtue	2	2
(Ontario) Paul Madgett	1	3
(Ontario) Wayne Tuck, Jr.	0	4

Pool E	W	L
(Ontario) John Epping	4	0
(Ontario) Don Bowser	3	1
(Ontario) Richard Krell	2	2
(Ontario) Jake Walker	1	3
(Prince Edward Island) Adam Casey	0	4

Pool C	W	L
(Scotland) David Murdoch	4	0
(United States) John Shuster	3	1
(Ontario) Chris Gardner	2	2
(Manitoba) William Lyburn	1	3
(United States) Greg Eigner	0	4

Pool F	W	L
(Ontario) Reid Carruthers	4	0
(Ontario) Greg Balsdon	3	1
(Ontario) Peter Corner	2	2
(Ontario) Mike Jakubo	1	3
(Ontario) Doug Brewer	0	4

=== Playoffs ===
Round of 12
(Sweden) Niklas Edin	8
(Quebec) Jean-Michel Ménard	5
(Ontario) Darryl Prebble	4
(Ontario) Don Bowser	6
(Ontario) Greg Balsdon	5
(United States) John Shuster	6
(Ontario) Mark Kean	9
(Quebec) Robert Desjardins	2

Quarterfinals
(Scotland) David Murdoch	5
(Sweden) Niklas Edin	4
(Ontario) John Epping	5
(Ontario) Don Bowser	3
(Manitoba) Mike McEwen	6
(United States) John Shuster	1
(Manitoba) Reid Carruthers	3
(Ontario) Mark Kean	6

Semifinals
(Scotland) David Murdoch	2
(Ontario) John Epping	4
(Manitoba) Mike McEwen	8
(Ontario) Mark Kean	5

Final
(Ontario) John Epping	2
(Manitoba) Mike McEwen	6

== Women ==
=== Teams ===
The teams are listed as follows:

Skip	Third	Second	Lead	Locale
Cathy Auld	Julie Reddick	Holly Donaldson	Carly Howard	Toronto, Ontario
Megan Balsdon	Jessica Corrado	Stephanie Corrado	Laura Hickey	Toronto, Ontario
Erika Brown	Alexandra Carlson	Rebecca Funk	Kendall Behm	(United States) Madison, Wisconsin
Chrissy Cadorin	Ginger Coyle	Stephanie Thompson	Lauren Wood	Thornhill, Ontario
Courtney de Winter	Trisha Halchuk	Emily Simpson	Raquel Auciello	Richmond Hill, Ontario
Lisa Farnell	Mallory Buist	Victoria Kyle	Ainsley Galbraith	Toronto, Ontario
Allison Flaxey	Katie Cottrill	Kristen Foster	Morgan Court	Listowel, Ontario
Clancy Grandy	Janet Murphy	Melissa Foster	Nicole Westlund	Mississauga, Ontario
Jacqueline Harrison	Susan Froud	Katelyn Wasylkiw	Jordan Ariss	Brantford, Ontario
Anna Hasselborg	Karin Rudstrom	Agnes Knochenhauer	Zandra Flyg	Gävle, Sweden
Julie Hastings	Christy Trombley	Stacey Smith	Katrina Collins	Thornhill, Ontario
Tracy Horgan	Jenn Horgan	Jenna Enge	Amanda Gates	Sudbury, Ontario
Danielle Inglis	Shannon Harrington	Cassandra de Groot	Kiri Campbell	Ottawa, Ontario
Michele Jaggi	Michelle Gribi	Stephanie Jaggi	Vera Camponovo	Bern, Switzerland
Chantal Lalonde		Rachelle Vink	Tess Bobbie	Woodstock, Ontario
Debbie McCormick	Emilia Juocys	Kate Bert	Stephanie Senneker	(United States) Rio, Wisconsin
Susan McKnight	Casey Kidd	Michelle Smith	Joanne Curtis	Uxbridge, Ontario
Breanne Meakin (skip); Hollie Nicol (fourth)	Lauren Horton	Lynn Kreviazuk	Jessica Armstrong	Ottawa, Ontario
Sherry Middaugh	Jo-Ann Rizzo	Lee Merklinger	Leigh Armstrong	Coldwater, Ontario
Erin Morrissey	Karen Sagle	Chantal Allan	Jen Ahde	Ottawa, Ontario
Brit O'Neill	Julia Weagle	Trish Scharf	Kim Brown	Ottawa, Ontario
Alina Pätz	Nadine Lehmann	Marisa Winkelhausen	Nicole Schwägli	Baden, Switzerland
Roxane Perron	Marie-Josee Fortier	Miriam Perron	Sonia Delisle	Trois-Rivières, Quebec
Silvana Tirinzoni	Manuela Siegrist	Esther Neuenschwander	Marlene Albrecht	Aarau, Switzerland
Rhonda Varnes	Melissa Gannon	Erin Macaulay	Rebecca Wichers-Schreur	Ottawa, Ontario

=== Round Robin Standings ===
Pool A	W	L
(Switzerland) Silvana Tirinzoni	3	1
(Ontario) Breanne Meakin	3	1
(Ontario) Clancy Grandy	3	1
(Ontario) Megan Balsdon	1	3
(Ontario) Courtney de Winter	0	4

Pool B	W	L
(Ontario) Allison Flaxey	3	1
(Ontario) Danielle Inglis	3	1
(Ontario) Chantal Lalonde	2	2
(United States) Erika Brown	2	2
(Ontario) Cathy Auld	0	4

Pool C	W	L
(Ontario) Jacqueline Harrison	3	1
(United States) Debbie McCormick	3	1
(Ontario) Sherry Middaugh	2	2
(Sweden) Anna Hasselborg	1	3
(Ontario) Chrissy Cadorin	1	3

Pool D	W	L
(Switzerland) Alina Pätz	4	0
(Ontario) Erin Morrissey	3	1
(Ontario) Brit O'Neill	1	3
(Quebec) Roxane Perron	1	3
(Ontario) Tracy Horgan	1	3

Pool E	W	L
(Ontario) Julie Hastings	4	0
(Ontario) Susan McKnight	3	1
(Switzerland) Michèle Jäggi	2	2
(Ontario) Rhonda Varnes	1	3
(Ontario) Lisa Farnell	0	4

=== Playoffs ===
Play-ins
(Ontario) Allison Flaxey	1
(Switzerland) Silvana Tirinzoni	7
(United States) Debbie McCormick	4
(Ontario) Erin Morrissey	5

Quarterfinals
(Ontario) Julie Hastings	5
(Switzerland) Silvana Tirinzoni	9
(Ontario) Breanne Meakin	11
(Ontario) Susan McKnight	5
(Switzerland) Alina Pätz	7
(Ontario) Erin Morrissey	1
(Ontario) Danielle Inglis	7
(Ontario) Jacqueline Harrison	2

Semifinals
(Switzerland) Silvana Tirinzoni	6
(Ontario) Breanne Meakin	1
(Switzerland) Alina Pätz	5
(Ontario) Danielle Inglis	3

Final
(Switzerland) Silvana Tirinzoni	8
(Switzerland) Alina Pätz	4
