= 2012 Royal LePage OVCA Women's Fall Classic =

- Host city: Kemptville, Ontario
- Arena: North Greenville Curling Club
- Dates: November 1–4
- Winner: (Ontario) Rachel Homan
- Skip: Rachel Homan
- Third: Emma Miskew
- Second: Alison Kreviazuk
- Lead: Lisa Weagle
- Finalist: (Ontario) Allison Nimik

The 2012 Royal LePage OVCA Women's Fall Classic was held from November 1 to 4 at the North Greenville Curling Club in Kemptville, Ontario as part of the 2012–13 World Curling Tour. The event was held in a triple knockout format, and the purse for the event was CAD$15,000, of which the winner, Rachel Homan, received CAD$5,000. Homan defeated Allison Nimik in the final with a score of 6–1.

== Teams ==
The teams are listed as follows:

Skip	Third	Second	Lead	Locale
Mary-Anne Arsenault	Colleen Jones	Kim Kelly	Jennifer Baxter	Halifax, Nova Scotia
Ève Bélisle	Joelle Belley	Martine Comeau	Laura Thomas	Montreal, Quebec
Alexandra Carlson	Monica Walker	Kendall Behm	Jordan Moulton	St. Paul, Minnesota
Gabrielle Coleman	Britt Rjanikov	Ann Drummie	Mary Shields	San Francisco, California
Lisa Farnell	Erin Morrissey	Karen Sagle	Ainsley Galbraith	Elgin, Ontario
Jaime Gardner	Allison Farrell	Kim Brown	Trish Scharf	Peterborough, Ontario
Julie Hastings	Christy Trombley	Stacey Smith	Katrina Collins	Thornhill, Ontario
Rachel Homan	Emma Miskew	Alison Kreviazuk	Lisa Weagle	Ottawa, Ontario
Chantal Lalonde	Shannon Harrington	Rachelle Vink	Tess Bobbie	Woodstock, Ontario
Patti Lank	Makenzie Lank	Nina Spatola	Caitlin Maroldo	(New York (state)) Rochester, New York
Marie-France Larouche	Brenda Nicholls	Véronique Grégoire	Amélie Blais	Saint-Romuald, Quebec
Lauren Mann	Patricia Hill	Jen Ahde	Jessica Barcauskas	Ottawa, Ontario
Cheryl McBain	Sheryl Doberko	France Charette	Susan Goheen	Ottawa, Ontario
Lindsay McKeown	Susan Hanna	Robyn Finner	Sarah Hogeboom	Kingston, Ontario
Ekaterina Antonova (fourth)	Victoria Moiseeva (skip)	Galina Arsenkina	Aleksandra Saitova	Moscow, Russia
Katie Morrissey	Kiri Campbell	Lorelle Weiss	Cassandra de Groot	Ottawa, Ontario
Allison Nimik	Katie Pringle	Lynn Kreviazuk	Morgan Court	Listowel, Ontario
Laura Payne	Alexis Riordan	Lynsey Longfield	Ailsa Leitch	Ottawa, Ontario
Roxane Perron	Marie-Josée Fortier	Sonia Delisle	Marie-France Paul	Trois-Rivières, Quebec
Darcy Robertson	Tracey Lavery	Vanessa Foster	Michelle Kruk	Winnipeg, Manitoba
Allison Ross	Audree Dufresne	Brittany O'Rourke	Sasha Beauchamp	Montreal, Quebec
Rhonda Varnes	Tanya Rodrigues	Nicol McNiven	Breanne Merklinger	Ottawa, Ontario
Marla Weinberger	Laura Roe	Kelly Senkiw	Nicole Vaillancourt	Ottawa, Ontario
Amy Wright	Courtney George	Aileen Sormunen	Armanda McLean	Duluth, Minnesota

== Knockout results ==
The draw is listed as follows:

=== A event ===
First Knockout		Semifinals		Qualifier 1
(Quebec) Marie-France Larouche	9
(Ontario) Lindsay McKeown	4	(Quebec) Marie-France Larouche	3
(New York (state)) Patti Lank	7	(New York (state)) Patti Lank	5
(Ontario) Lauren Mann	2			(New York (state)) Patti Lank	4
(Ontario) Rhonda Varnes	2			(Russia) Victorya Moiseeva	8
(Russia) Victorya Moiseeva	7	(Russia) Victorya Moiseeva	7
(Ontario) Lisa Farnell	5	(Ontario) Laura Payne	6
(Ontario) Laura Payne	6

First Knockout		Semifinals		Qualifier 2
(Minnesota) Alexandra Carlson	7
(Ontario) Marla Weinberger	2	(Minnesota) Alexandra Carlson	8
(Ontario) Cheryl McBain	7	(Ontario) Cheryl McBain	7
(Manitoba) Darcy Robertson	5			(Minnesota) Alexandra Carlson	6
(Ontario) Katie Morrissey	1			(Quebec) Ève Bélisle	9
(Ontario) Julie Hastings	9	(Ontario) Julie Hastings	4
(Quebec) Ève Bélisle	5	(Quebec) Ève Bélisle	7
(Ontario) Jaime Gardner	4

First Knockout		Semifinals		Qualifier 3
(Ontario) Rachel Homan	7
(Minnesota) Amy Wright	6	(Ontario) Rachel Homan	5
(Quebec) Allison Ross	8	(Nova Scotia) Mary-Anne Arsenault	2
(Nova Scotia) Mary-Anne Arsenault	10			(Ontario) Rachel Homan	4
(Ontario) Allison Nimik	6			(Ontario) Allison Nimik	1
(California) Gabrielle Coleman	2	(Ontario) Allison Nimik	8
(Ontario) Chantal Lalonde	7	(Ontario) Chantal Lalonde	4
(Quebec) Roxane Perron	3

=== B event ===
Second Knockout
(Ontario) Lindsay McKeown	2
(Ontario) Lauren Mann	7
(Ontario) Rhonda Varnes	5
(Ontario) Lisa Farnell	6

Quarterfinals
(Nova Scotia) Mary-Anne Arsenault	5
(Ontario) Lauren Mann	3
(Ontario) Chantal Lalonde	6
(Ontario) Lisa Farnell	5

Semifinals
(Nova Scotia) Mary-Anne Arsenault	5
(Ontario) Chantal Lalonde	4

Qualifier 4
(Nova Scotia) Mary-Anne Arsenault	7
(Minnesota) Alexandra Carlson	2

Second Knockout
(Ontario) Marla Weinberger	1
(Manitoba) Darcy Robertson	9
(Ontario) Katie Morrissey	6
(Ontario) Jaime Gardner	5

Quarterfinals
(Quebec) Marie-France Larouche	7
(Manitoba) Darcy Robertson	6
(Ontario) Laura Payne	2
(Ontario) Katie Morrissey	6

Semifinals
(Quebec) Marie-France Larouche	6
(Ontario) Katie Morrissey	4

Qualifier 5
(Quebec) Marie-France Larouche	3
(Ontario) Allison Nimik	9

Second Knockout
(Minnesota) Amy Wright	6
(Quebec) Allison Ross	7
(California) Gabrielle Coleman	6
(Quebec) Roxane Perron	10

Quarterfinals
(Ontario) Cheryl McBain	8
(Quebec) Allison Ross	7
(Ontario) Julie Hastings	2
(Quebec) Roxane Perron	8

Semifinals
(Ontario) Cheryl McBain	2
(Quebec) Roxane Perron	5

Qualifier 6
(Quebec) Roxane Perron	4
(New York (state)) Patti Lank	6

=== C event ===
Third Knockout
(Manitoba) Darcy Robertson	7
(Ontario) Laura Payne	5
(Quebec) Allison Ross	3
(Ontario) Julie Hastings	4

Quarterfinals
(Ontario) Lauren Mann	6
(Ontario) Lisa Farnell	4
(Manitoba) Darcy Robertson	6
(Ontario) Cheryl McBain	7
(Ontario) Chantal Lalonde	3
(Ontario) Julie Hastings	8

Semifinals
(Ontario) Lauren Mann	7
(Ontario) Cheryl McBain	3
(Ontario) Julie Hastings	5
(Quebec) Marie-France Larouche	3

Qualifier 7
(Ontario) Lauren Mann	1
(Ontario) Julie Hastings	8

Third Knockout
(Ontario) Lindsay McKeown	2
(Ontario) Rhonda Varnes	4
(Ontario) Marla Weinberger	2
(Ontario) Jaime Gardner	10
(Minnesota) Amy Wright	7
(California) Gabrielle Coleman	5

Quarterfinals
(Ontario) Rhonda Varnes	7
(Ontario) Katie Morrissey	8
(Ontario) Jaime Gardner	4
(Minnesota) Amy Wright	8

Semifinals
(Quebec) Roxane Perron	6
(Ontario) Katie Morrissey	4
(Minnesota) Alexandra Carlson	2
(Minnesota) Amy Wright	8

Qualifier 8
(Quebec) Roxane Perron	4
(Minnesota) Amy Wright	6

== Playoffs ==
The playoffs draw is listed as follows:

Quarterfinals
(Russia) Victorya Moiseeva	3
(Minnesota) Amy Wright	7
(Nova Scotia) Mary-Anne Arsenault	3
(Ontario) Allison Nimik	4
(Quebec) Ève Bélisle	4
(Ontario) Julie Hastings	7
(Ontario) Rachel Homan	6
(New York (state)) Patti Lank	0

Semifinals
(Minnesota) Amy Wright	3
(Ontario) Allison Nimik	6
(Ontario) Julie Hastings	4
(Ontario) Rachel Homan	6

Final
(Ontario) Allison Nimik	1
(Ontario) Rachel Homan	6
