= 2015 Ontario Scotties Tournament of Hearts =

- Host city: Penetanguishene, Ontario
- Arena: Penetanguishene Curling Club
- Dates: January 19–25
- Winner: Julie Hastings
- Curling club: Bayview CC, Thornhill
- Skip: Julie Hastings
- Third: Christy Trombley
- Second: Stacey Smith
- Lead: Katrina Collins
- Finalist: Sherry Middaugh

The 2015 Ontario Scotties Tournament of Hearts, the provincial women's curling championship for Southern Ontario, was held January 19 to 25 at the Penetanguishene Curling Club in Penetanguishene, Ontario. The winning Julie Hastings team represented Ontario at the 2015 Scotties Tournament of Hearts in Moose Jaw, Saskatchewan.

The event marked the first tournament to exclude teams from Northern Ontario, which began to have its own entry into the Scotties, the 2015 Northern Ontario Scotties Tournament of Hearts.

== Qualification Process ==
Due to the exclusion of Northern Ontario, qualifying for the provincial Scotties changed for 2015. Ten teams still qualify for the provincial tournament; two teams qualified from each of the four Ontario Curling Association regions, one team qualified from a second-chance Challenge Round, while the defending champion team (Allison Flaxey rink) automatically qualified.

The defending two-time national Scotties champion Rachel Homan rink once again did not participate in the qualification process, as her team won the 2014 Scotties Tournament of Hearts and therefore continued to represent Team Canada at the 2015 Scotties Tournament of Hearts.

Qualification method	Berths	Qualifying team
Defending champion	1	Allison Flaxey
Region 1 Qualifiers	2	Rhonda Varnes; Danielle Inglis
Region 2 Qualifiers	2	Megan Balsdon; Clancy Grandy
Region 3 Qualifiers	2	Sherry Middaugh; Shannon Kee
Region 4 Qualifiers	2	Caitlin Romain; Jacqueline Harrison
Challenge Round Qualifiers	1	Julie Hastings

== Teams ==
Skip	Third	Second	Lead	Alternate	Club(s)
Megan Balsdon	Jessica Corrado	Stephanie Corrado	Laura Hickey		Dixie CC, Mississauga
Allison Flaxey	Katie Cottrill	Kristen Foster	Morgan Court		Listowel CC, Listowel
Clancy Grandy	Janet Murphy	Melissa Foster	Nicole Westlund	Stephanie Matheson	Mississaugua G&CC, Mississauga
Jacqueline Harrison	Susan Froud	Katelyn Wasylkiw	Jordan Ariss		Brant CC, Brantford
Julie Hastings	Christy Trombley	Stacey Smith	Katrina Collins		Bayview CC, Thornhill
Danielle Inglis	Shannon Harrington	Cassandra de Groot	Kiri Campbell		Ottawa CC, Ottawa
Shannon Kee	Pam Feldkamp	Margot Flemming	Halyna Tepylo	Megan Arnold	Westmount G&CC, Kitchener
Sherry Middaugh	Jo-Ann Rizzo	Lee Merklinger	Lori Eddy		Coldwater & District CC, Coldwater
Caitlin Romain	Kendall Haymes	Kerilyn Mathers	Cheryl Kreviazuk		Glendale G&CC, Hamilton
Rhonda Varnes	Melissa Gannon	Melissa McAuley	Rebecca Wichers Schreur		Rideau CC, Ottawa

== Round-robin standings ==
Key
Teams to Playoffs

Skip (Club)	W	L	PF	PA	Ends Won	Ends Lost	Blank Ends	Stolen Ends
Julie Hastings (Bayview)	8	1	69	34	41	27	11	16
Sherry Middaugh (Coldwater)	7	2	66	43	41	34	10	14
Jacqueline Harrison (Brant)	6	3	60	47	40	35	11	10
Clancy Grandy (Mississaugua)	5	4	59	58	35	37	8	9
Allison Flaxey (Listowel)	4	5	65	56	39	37	9	13
Caitlin Romain (Glendale)	4	5	48	61	31	35	11	7
Rhonda Varnes (Rideau)	3	6	44	61	32	37	12	5
Danielle Inglis (Ottawa)	3	6	49	58	34	38	12	9
Shannon Kee (Westmount)	3	6	47	68	33	38	6	10
Megan Balsdon (Dixie)	2	7	39	60	32	40	14	6

== Round-robin results ==
=== Draw 1 ===
Monday, January 19, 7:00 pm

Sheet 1	1	2	3	4	5	6	7	8	9	10	Final
Rhonda Varnes 🔨	0	0	0	3	0	0	1	0	2	4	10
Allison Flaxey	1	1	1	0	0	2	0	2	0	0	7

Sheet 2	1	2	3	4	5	6	7	8	9	10	11	Final
Sherry Middaugh	1	0	0	1	0	1	0	1	1	0	4	9
Megan Balsdon 🔨	0	1	1	0	1	0	1	0	0	1	0	5

Sheet 3	1	2	3	4	5	6	7	8	9	10	Final
Danielle Inglis 🔨	2	0	2	2	2	0	2	0	X	X	10
Shannon Kee	0	2	0	0	0	1	0	1	X	X	4

Sheet 4	1	2	3	4	5	6	7	8	9	10	Final
Caitlin Romain	0	0	1	0	0	0	0	0	X	X	1
Julie Hastings 🔨	0	2	0	0	0	2	0	3	X	X	7

Sheet 5	1	2	3	4	5	6	7	8	9	10	Final
Clancy Grandy	0	1	0	0	2	0	1	0	1	0	5
Jacqueline Harrison 🔨	2	0	2	2	0	1	0	1	0	1	9

=== Draw 2 ===
Tuesday, January 20, 2:00 pm

Sheet 1	1	2	3	4	5	6	7	8	9	10	Final
Megan Balsdon	0	1	0	0	1	0	0	1	0	X	3
Jacqueline Harrison 🔨	1	0	1	1	0	0	1	0	2	X	6

Sheet 2	1	2	3	4	5	6	7	8	9	10	Final
Rhonda Varnes 🔨	0	0	0	0	2	0	1	0	1	2	6
Danielle Inglis	0	0	1	1	0	2	0	1	0	0	5

Sheet 3	1	2	3	4	5	6	7	8	9	10	Final
Allison Flaxey 🔨	0	2	0	2	1	0	1	1	0	X	7
Caitlin Romain	0	0	1	0	0	2	0	0	1	X	4

Sheet 4	1	2	3	4	5	6	7	8	9	10	Final
Sherry Middaugh 🔨	0	1	1	0	1	0	3	3	X	X	9
Clancy Grandy	0	0	0	0	0	2	0	0	X	X	2

Sheet 5	1	2	3	4	5	6	7	8	9	10	Final
Shannon Kee	0	0	0	1	0	0	X	X	X	X	1
Julie Hastings 🔨	2	2	2	0	2	4	X	X	X	X	12

=== Draw 3 ===
Tuesday, January 20, 7:00 pm

Sheet 1	1	2	3	4	5	6	7	8	9	10	Final
Shannon Kee	1	0	2	0	0	0	2	0	0	X	5
Sherry Middaugh 🔨	0	1	0	2	1	2	0	2	3	X	11

Sheet 2	1	2	3	4	5	6	7	8	9	10	Final
Caitlin Romain 🔨	2	1	0	0	1	0	0	2	0	X	6
Clancy Grandy	0	0	2	2	0	3	1	0	5	X	13

Sheet 3	1	2	3	4	5	6	7	8	9	10	Final
Julie Hastings	0	0	0	0	0	1	1	0	3	2	7
Rhonda Varnes 🔨	0	0	1	1	1	0	0	1	0	0	4

Sheet 4	1	2	3	4	5	6	7	8	9	10	Final
Jacqueline Harrison 🔨	2	0	0	2	1	0	0	1	0	0	6
Danielle Inglis	0	1	0	0	0	0	2	0	1	1	5

Sheet 5	1	2	3	4	5	6	7	8	9	10	Final
Megan Balsdon 🔨	0	1	0	0	1	0	0	1	0	X	3
Allison Flaxey	0	0	0	2	0	0	4	0	2	X	8

=== Draw 4 ===
Wednesday, January 21, 2:00 pm

Sheet 1	1	2	3	4	5	6	7	8	9	10	Final
Rhonda Varnes	0	1	0	2	0	0	1	0	1	0	5
Caitlin Romain 🔨	1	0	1	0	0	1	0	3	0	1	7

Sheet 2	1	2	3	4	5	6	7	8	9	10	Final
Shannon Kee	0	1	0	0	1	1	1	1	0	1	6
Megan Balsdon 🔨	0	0	1	1	0	0	0	0	1	0	3

Sheet 3	1	2	3	4	5	6	7	8	9	10	Final
Sherry Middaugh	0	0	1	1	0	2	0	2	0	X	6
Jacqueline Harrison 🔨	0	2	0	0	1	0	1	0	0	X	4

Sheet 4	1	2	3	4	5	6	7	8	9	10	Final
Allison Flaxey	0	2	0	1	1	0	1	0	0	X	5
Julie Hastings 🔨	2	0	3	0	0	1	0	1	2	X	9

Sheet 5	1	2	3	4	5	6	7	8	9	10	Final
Clancy Grandy 🔨	1	1	1	0	0	0	0	0	1	0	4
Danielle Inglis	0	0	0	3	0	0	0	2	0	1	6

=== Draw 5 ===
Wednesday, January 21, 7:00 pm

Sheet 1	1	2	3	4	5	6	7	8	9	10	Final
Danielle Inglis 🔨	0	0	1	0	2	1	0	0	X	X	4
Allison Flaxey	1	3	0	2	0	0	3	4	X	X	13

Sheet 2	1	2	3	4	5	6	7	8	9	10	Final
Julie Hastings 🔨	2	0	0	0	4	1	0	0	1	X	8
Jacqueline Harrison	0	0	1	0	0	0	2	1	0	X	4

Sheet 3	1	2	3	4	5	6	7	8	9	10	11	Final
Megan Balsdon	0	1	0	1	0	0	2	0	3	0	0	7
Clancy Grandy 🔨	1	0	1	0	1	0	0	2	0	2	1	8

Sheet 4	1	2	3	4	5	6	7	8	9	10	Final
Rhonda Varnes	0	1	0	0	1	0	1	0	X	X	3
Sherry Middaugh 🔨	2	0	0	1	0	3	0	2	X	X	8

Sheet 5	1	2	3	4	5	6	7	8	9	10	Final
Caitlin Romain 🔨	2	0	0	0	1	0	X	X	X	X	3
Shannon Kee	0	1	2	4	0	2	X	X	X	X	9

=== Draw 6 ===
Thursday, January 22, 2:00 pm

Sheet 1	1	2	3	4	5	6	7	8	9	10	Final
Julie Hastings 🔨	1	0	1	1	1	1	0	3	X	X	8
Clancy Grandy	0	1	0	0	0	0	1	0	X	X	2

Sheet 2	1	2	3	4	5	6	7	8	9	10	Final
Allison Flaxey	0	1	0	0	2	1	0	2	1	X	7
Shannon Kee 🔨	2	0	2	0	0	0	1	0	0	X	5

Sheet 3	1	2	3	4	5	6	7	8	9	10	Final
Caitlin Romain	0	3	1	0	0	2	1	0	1	X	8
Sherry Middaugh 🔨	1	0	0	2	1	0	0	0	0	X	4

Sheet 4	1	2	3	4	5	6	7	8	9	10	Final
Danielle Inglis 🔨	2	0	0	2	0	0	2	0	0	0	6
Megan Balsdon	0	0	3	0	0	1	0	1	1	1	7

Sheet 5	1	2	3	4	5	6	7	8	9	10	Final
Jacqueline Harrison	1	0	0	2	0	0	2	3	0	X	8
Rhonda Varnes 🔨	0	0	1	0	1	1	0	0	1	X	4

=== Draw 7 ===
Thursday, January 22, 7:00 pm

Sheet 1	1	2	3	4	5	6	7	8	9	10	Final
Caitlin Romain 🔨	0	1	1	0	0	4	0	1	X	X	7
Megan Balsdon	1	0	0	0	1	0	0	0	X	X	2

Sheet 2	1	2	3	4	5	6	7	8	9	10	Final
Clancy Grandy 🔨	2	0	2	2	2	X	X	X	X	X	8
Rhonda Varnes	0	1	0	0	0	X	X	X	X	X	1

Sheet 3	1	2	3	4	5	6	7	8	9	10	Final
Danielle Inglis 🔨	0	0	0	1	0	2	0	1	0	X	4
Julie Hastings	1	1	1	0	1	0	1	0	1	X	6

Sheet 4	1	2	3	4	5	6	7	8	9	10	11	Final
Shannon Kee	0	1	1	0	1	0	0	2	0	0	1	6
Jacqueline Harrison 🔨	1	0	0	1	0	0	2	0	0	1	0	5

Sheet 5	1	2	3	4	5	6	7	8	9	10	11	Final
Allison Flaxey	1	0	0	1	0	1	0	0	0	2	0	5
Sherry Middaugh 🔨	0	0	1	0	0	0	2	1	1	0	1	6

=== Draw 8 ===
Friday, January 23, 2:00 pm

Sheet 1	1	2	3	4	5	6	7	8	9	10	Final
Sherry Middaugh	0	0	1	0	1	0	0	2	0	0	4
Danielle Inglis 🔨	0	1	0	1	0	1	1	0	1	1	6

Sheet 2	1	2	3	4	5	6	7	8	9	10	Final
Jacqueline Harrison 🔨	1	2	0	1	1	1	0	0	5	X	11
Caitlin Romain	0	0	1	0	0	0	2	1	0	X	4

Sheet 3	1	2	3	4	5	6	7	8	9	10	Final
Rhonda Varnes 🔨	3	0	2	0	1	0	0	1	0	1	8
Shannon Kee	0	1	0	2	0	1	0	0	2	0	6

Sheet 4	1	2	3	4	5	6	7	8	9	10	Final
Clancy Grandy	1	0	1	0	2	0	1	0	1	2	8
Allison Flaxey 🔨	0	2	0	2	0	2	0	1	0	0	7

Sheet 5	1	2	3	4	5	6	7	8	9	10	Final
Julie Hastings	0	1	0	0	0	2	0	0	3	1	7
Megan Balsdon 🔨	1	0	0	1	0	0	1	1	0	0	4

=== Draw 9 ===
Friday, January 23, 7:00 pm

Sheet 1	1	2	3	4	5	6	7	8	9	10	Final
Clancy Grandy 🔨	0	3	0	0	0	3	0	0	3	X	9
Shannon Kee	1	0	0	2	0	0	1	1	0	X	5

Sheet 2	1	2	3	4	5	6	7	8	9	10	Final
Sherry Middaugh	0	0	2	0	1	1	0	2	0	3	9
Julie Hastings 🔨	1	1	0	0	0	0	2	0	1	0	5

Sheet 3	1	2	3	4	5	6	7	8	9	10	Final
Jacqueline Harrison	1	0	2	0	2	0	0	1	0	1	7
Allison Flaxey 🔨	0	1	0	1	0	0	1	0	3	0	6

Sheet 4	1	2	3	4	5	6	7	8	9	10	Final
Megan Balsdon 🔨	2	0	0	2	0	0	0	1	0	X	5
Rhonda Varnes	0	1	0	0	1	0	0	0	1	X	3

Sheet 5	1	2	3	4	5	6	7	8	9	10	Final
Danielle Inglis	0	0	0	1	0	1	0	1	0	X	3
Caitlin Romain 🔨	0	0	2	0	1	0	3	0	2	X	8

== Playoffs ==
Page playoff system
1	Julie Hastings	8
2	Sherry Middaugh	4
3	Jacqueline Harrison	3
4	Clancy Grandy	9

Semifinal
2	Sherry Middaugh	7
4	Clancy Grandy	6

Final
1	Julie Hastings	9
2	Sherry Middaugh	5

=== 3 vs. 4 ===
Saturday, January 24, 2:00 pm

Team	1	2	3	4	5	6	7	8	9	10	Final
Jacqueline Harrison 🔨	0	0	0	1	0	1	0	1	0	X	3
Clancy Grandy	2	0	1	0	1	0	3	0	2	X	9

=== 1 vs. 2 ===
Saturday, January 24, 7:00 pm

Team	1	2	3	4	5	6	7	8	9	10	Final
Julie Hastings 🔨	0	0	1	0	3	0	1	0	3	X	8
Sherry Middaugh	0	0	0	1	0	2	0	1	0	X	4

=== Semifinal ===
Sunday, January 25, 9:30 am

Team	1	2	3	4	5	6	7	8	9	10	Final
Sherry Middaugh 🔨	0	3	0	1	0	0	0	1	0	2	7
Clancy Grandy	1	0	2	0	1	0	1	0	1	0	6

=== Final ===
Sunday, January 25, 4:00 pm

Team	1	2	3	4	5	6	7	8	9	10	Final
Julie Hastings	0	0	0	4	1	0	2	0	2	X	9
Sherry Middaugh	0	0	1	0	0	3	0	1	0	X	5

2015 Ontario Scotties Tournament of Hearts

Julie Hastings
1st Ontario Provincial Championship title

== Qualification ==
Southern Ontario zones will run from December 12-December 21, 2014. Two teams from each zone qualify for regionals.

Regional Qualifiers In Bold

=== Zone Qualification ===
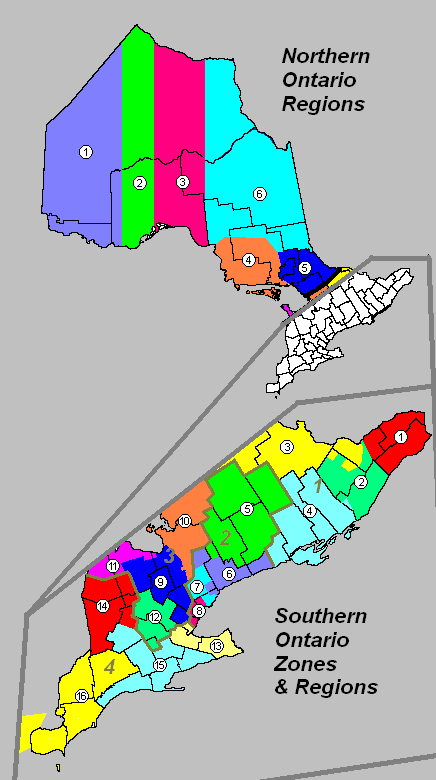
Zone Map

==== Zone 1 ====
December 12–14, at the RCMP Curling Club, Ottawa

Teams entered:

- **Jennifer Harvey (Cornwall)**
- **Erin Morrissey (Ottawa)**
- **Danielle Inglis (Ottawa)**

All teams qualified due to lack of teams in Region.

==== Zone 2 ====
December 12–14, at the RCMP Curling Club, Ottawa

Teams entered:

- **Celeste Butler-Rohland (Rideau)**
- **Rhonda Varnes (Rideau)**
- **Jaqui Lavoie (Rideau)**

All teams qualified due to lack of teams in Region (event still held, however).

Bracket:

A side			A Final
2	**Varnes**	**W**
3	Lavoie	L	1	Butler-Rohland	3
			2	**Varnes**	**7**

B Final
1	**Butler-Rohland**	**7**
3	Lavoie	1

==== Zone 3 ====
December 12–14, at the RCMP Curling Club, Ottawa

Teams entered:

- **Brit O'Neill (City View)**

Due to lack of entries in region, no other team qualified from this zone.

==== Zone 4 ====
December 19–21, at the Napanee & District Curling Club, Napanee

Teams entered:

- No teams entered (4A filled by Jennifer Harvey; 4B filled by Jacquie Lavoie)

==== Zone 5 ====
Teams entered:

- **Emma Joyce** (Lindsay) (automatically qualifies as only team)

One additional team will be selected from Zone 8.

==== Zone 6 ====
December 6–7, at the Unionville Curling Club, Unionville

Teams entered:

- **Susan McKnight (Uxbridge)**
- Janet McGhee (Unionville)
- **Stephanie Van Huyse (Whitby)**

Brackets:

A side			A Final
2	**McGhee**	**9**
3	Van Huyse	8	1	**McKnight**	**9**
			2	McGhee	1

B Final
2	McGhee	6
3	**Van Huyse**	**7**

==== Zone 7 ====
Teams entered:

- **Julie Hastings** (Bayview)
- **Courtney de Winter** (Richmond Hill)

Both teams qualify as there were no other entries.

==== Zone 8 ====
December 13–14, at the Dixie Curling Club, Mississauga

Teams entered:

- **Clancy Grandy** (Mississaugua)
- **Megan Balsdon** (Dixie)
- Kelly Cochrane (High Park)
- **Samantha Peters** (Royal Canadian)
- Susan Baird (Dixie)

(One additional team qualifies to fill vacancy in Zone 5)

Brackets:

A1 Final
2	Balsdon	6
3	**Cochrane**	**8**

Semifinals			A2 Final
4	**Peters**	**8**
5	Baird	7	1	**Grandy**	**8**
			4	Peters	6

B side			B Final
2	**Balsdon**	**8**
5	Baird	2	2	**Balsdon**	**4**
			4	Peters	3

==== Zone 9 ====
December 19–21, at The Club at North Halton, Georgetown

Teams entered:

- **Emma Joyce** (Orangeville) (automatically qualifies as only team)

Due to lack of entries in Region 2, no additional team will be selected for this zone.

==== Zone 10 ====
Teams entered:

- **Sherry Middaugh** (Coldwater)
- **Peggy Darmody** (Penetanguishene)

Both teams qualify as there were no other entries.

==== Zone 11 ====
No teams entered.

==== Zone 12 ====
December 13 at the Galt Country Club, Gambridge

Teams entered:

- **Courtney Gilder (Kitchener-Waterloo Granite)**
- **Shannon Kee (Westmount)**

Both teams qualify as there were no other entries.

==== Zone 13 ====
December 6, at the Glendale Golf & Country Club, Hamilton

Teams entered:

- **Caitlin Romain (Glendale)**
- Mallory Kean (Glendale)
- **Marilyn Bodogh (St. Catharines Golf)**
- **Michelle Fletcher (Burlington)**

Brackets:

A side			A Final
1	**Romain**	**4**
4	Fletcher	2	1	**Romain**	**7**
2	Kean	4	3	Bodogh	5
3	**Bodogh**	**6**

B Final
2	Kean	8
4	**Fletcher**	**10**

==== Zone 14 ====
Teams entered:

- **Cathy Auld** (Listowel) (automatically qualifies as only team)

One additional team will be selected from Zone 13.

==== Zone 15 ====
December 13, at the Brantford Golf & Country Club, Brantford

Teams entered:

- **Jacqueline Harrison (Brant)**
- **Chantal Lalonde (Woodstock)**
- Amie Shackleton (St. Marys)

Brackets:

A side			A Final
2	**Lalonde**	**9**
3	Shackleton	6	1	Harrison	4
			2	**Lalonde**	**5**

B Final
3	Schackleton	6
1	**Harrison**	**8**

==== Zone 16 ====
December 13, at the Chatham Granite Club, Chatham

Teams entered:

- **Chrissy Cadorin (London)**
- Bethany Heinrichs (Ilderton)
- **Dianne Dykstra (Chatham Granite)**

Brackets:

A side			A Final
2	Heinrichs	4
3	**Dykstra**	**9**	1	Cadorin	6
			3	**Dykstra**	**8**

B Final
2	Heinrichs	4
1	**Cadorin**	**6**

=== Regional Qualification ===
==== Region 1 ====
January 3–4 at the Smiths Falls Curling Club, Smiths Falls

A Side
4	Brit O'Neill	3
5	**Rhonda Varnes**	**6**
3	**Celeste Butler-Rohland**	**9**
6	Jennifer Harvey	3
7	Jacqui Lavoie	0
2	**Danielle Inglis**	**9**

Semifinal
1	Erin Morrissey	5
5	**Rhonda Varnes**	**6**
3	Celeste Butler-Rohland	2
2	**Danielle Inglis**	**6**

**Final**
5	**Rhonda Varnes**	**9**
2	Danielle Inglis	1

B side
6	**Jennifer Harvey**	**12**
7	Jacqui Lavoie	7

Quarterfinal
1	**Erin Morrissey**	**9**
6	Jennifer Harvey	3
4	Brit O'Neill	4
3	**Celeste Butler-Rohland**	**8**

Semifinal
1	**Erin Morrissey**	**7**
3	Celeste Butler-Rohland	6

Final
2	**Danielle Inglis**	**8**
1	Erin Morrissey	5

==== Region 2 ====
January 3–4 at the Oshawa Golf and Curling Club, Oshawa

A Side			Semifinal			**Final**
1	**Julie Hastings**	**11**
8	Emma Joyce	4	1	Julie Hastings	3
5	Kelly Cochrane	5	5	**Megan Balsdon**	**6**
4	**Megan Balsdon**	**6**				5	**Megan Balsdon**	**8**
3	**Clancy Grandy**	**9**				3	Clancy Grandy	5
6	Stephanie Van Huyse	1	3	**Clancy Grandy**	**7**
7	Courtney de Winter	7	2	Susan McKnight	6
2	Susan McKnight	**10**

B side
8	Emma Joyce	1
5	**Kelly Cochrane**	**8**
6	**Stephanie Van Huyse**	**8**
7	Courtney de Winter	5

Quarterfinal
2	**Susan McKnight**	**9**
5	Kelly Cochrane	4
1	Julie Hastings	5
6	**Stephanie Van Huyse**	**7**

Semifinal
2	Susan McKnight	3
6	**Stephanie Van Huyse**	**8**

Final
3	**Clancy Grandy**	**10**
6	Stephanie Van Huyse	5

==== Region 3 ====
January 3–4 at the Alliston Curling Club, Alliston

A Side			Semifinal			**Final**
			2	**Shannon Kee**	**7**
			3	Kristy Russell	6
						2	Shannon Kee	2
4	**Courtney Gilder**	**10**				1	**Sherry Middaugh**	**9**
5	Peggy Darmody	3	4	Courtney Gilder	4
			1	**Sherry Middaugh**	**6**

A Side			Semifinal			**Final**
						2	**Shannon Kee**	**9**
3	**Kristy Russell**	**8**				3	Kristy Russell	3
5	Peggy Darmody	6	3	**Kristy Russell**	**7**
			4	Courtney Gilder	1

==== Region 4 ====
January 3–4 at the Grimsby Curling Club, Grimsby

A Side			Semifinal			**Final**
1	Cathy Auld	4
8	**Michelle Fletcher**	**8**	8	**Michelle Fletcher**	**5**
5	Marilyn Bodogh	4	4	Chantal Lalonde	4
4	**Chantal Lalonde**	**6**				8	Michelle Fletcher	5
3	Chrissy Cadorin	5				6	**Caitlin Romain**	**7**
6	**Caitlin Romain**	**7**	6	**Caitlin Romain**	**5**
7	Dianne Dykstra	6	2	Jacqueline Harrison	4
2	**Jacqueline Harrison**	**8**

B side
1	**Cathy Auld**	**9**
5	Marilyn Bodogh	2
3	Chrissy Cadorin	6
7	**Dianne Dykstra**	**9**

Quarterfinal
2	**Jacqueline Harrison**	**8**
1	Cathy Auld	1
4	**Chantal Lalonde**	**5**
7	Dianne Dykstra	4

Semifinal
2	**Jacqueline Harrison**	**8**
4	Chantal Lalonde	2

Final
8	Michelle Fletcher	2
2	**Jacqueline Harrison**	**9**

=== Challenge Round ===
January 10–11, Brockville Country Club, Brockville

A side			A Final
1	**Julie Hastings**	**8**
4	Chrissy Cadorin	7	1	**Julie Hastings**	**10**
3	Celeste Butler-Rohland	3	2	Erin Morrissey	5
2	**Erin Morrissey**	**10**

B side			Finals
4	Chrissy Cadorin	5
3	**Celeste Butler-Rohland**	**6**	3	Celeste Butler-Rohland	7
			2	**Erin Morrissey**	**10**

(Hastings must be beaten twice)

Final
1	**Julie Hastings**	**7**
2	Erin Morrissey	5
