= Kreviazuk =

Kreviazuk is a Ukrainian surname. Notable people with the surname include:

- Alison Kreviazuk (born 1987), Canadian curler
- Chantal Kreviazuk (born 1973), Canadian singer, songwriter, composer, pianist, and actress
- Cheryl Kreviazuk (born 1992), Canadian curler
- Lynn Kreviazuk (born 1991), Canadian curler
