= 2012 CIS/CCA Curling Championships =

- Host city: Welland, Ontario
- Arena: Welland Curling Club
- Dates: March 14–18
- Men's winner: Alberta Golden Bears
- Skip: Brendan Bottcher
- Third: Mick Lizmore
- Second: Brad Thiessen
- Lead: Karrick Martin
- Alternate: Parker Konschuh
- Finalist: (Ontario) Waterloo Warriors (Jake Walker)
- Women's winner: (Ontario) Wilfrid Laurier Golden Hawks
- Skip: Laura Crocker
- Third: Sarah Wilkes
- Second: Jen Gates
- Lead: Pamela Feldkamp
- Alternate: Cheryl Kreviazuk
- Finalist: (Ontario) Brock Badgers (Joanne Curtis)

The 2012 CIS/CCA Curling Championships were held from March 14 to 18 at the Welland Curling Club in Welland, Ontario. The host university of the event was Brock University, located in nearby St. Catharines. The winners of the event, the teams from the University of Alberta and from Wilfrid Laurier University skipped by Brendan Bottcher and Laura Crocker, respectively, will go on to represent Canada at the 2013 Winter Universiade in Trentino, Italy.

Eight teams of each gender competed at the championships, including two from Western Canada, two from Atlantic Canada, and three from Ontario, including the hosts, Brock University. Quebec held one spot each in the men's and women's championships, but chose not to use their entries, so the spots were filled by a team from Western Canada on the men's side and a team from Ontario on the women's side. The format was the same as the previous year's format; the teams competed in a round robin, and at the conclusion of the round robin, the first place team received a bye straight through to the final, and the second and third place teams played for the second spot in the final.

== Men ==
=== Teams ===
The teams are listed as follows:

Team	Skip	Third	Second	Lead	Alternate	Coach	University
UPEI Panthers	Brett Gallant	Alex MacFadyen	Sam Ramsay	Connor MacPhee		Kathie Gallant	University of Prince Edward Island
Acadia Axemen	Robert Mayhew	Michael Brophy	Alex Trites	Ben Creaser	Luke Melanson	Alan Mayhew	(Nova Scotia) Acadia University
Alberta Golden Bears	Brendan Bottcher	Mick Lizmore	Brad Thiessen	Karrick Martin	Parker Konschuh	Bernie Panich	University of Alberta
Manitoba Bisons	Travis Bale	Curtis Bale	Kelly Fordyce	Derek Blanchard		Ray Fillion	University of Manitoba
Winnipeg Wesmen	Daniel Birchard	Joshua Drews	Nicholas Drews	Jake Zelenewich	Andrew Ferguson	Len Komyshyn	(Manitoba) University of Winnipeg
Carleton Ravens	Chris Lewis	Ryan McCrady	Ben Miskew	Graham Rathwell	Brett Lyon-Hatcher	Art Miskew	(Ontario) Carleton University
Waterloo Warriors	Jake Walker	Edward Cyr	Geoff Chambers	James Freeman	Nathan Ransom	Scott Allen	(Ontario) University of Waterloo
Brock Badgers	Scott Brandon	Blake Sandham	Richard Roessner	Mike Idzenga	Kevin Mailloux	Matt Wilkinson	(Ontario) Brock University

=== Round-robin standings ===
Final round-robin standings

Key
Teams to Playoffs

University	Skip	W	L
Alberta Golden Bears	Brendan Bottcher	6	1
(Ontario) Waterloo Warriors	Jake Walker	5	2
(Ontario) Brock Badgers	Scott Brandon	4	3
(Nova Scotia) Acadia Axemen	Robert Mayhew	3	4
Manitoba Bisons	Travis Bale	3	4
(Prince Edward Island) UPEI Panthers	Brett Gallant	3	4
(Ontario) Carleton Ravens	Chris Lewis	2	5
(Manitoba) Winnipeg Wesmen	Daniel Birchard	2	5

=== Round-robin results ===
All times listed in Eastern Standard Time (UTC−5).

==== Draw 1 ====
Wednesday, March 14, 7:00 pm

Sheet A	1	2	3	4	5	6	7	8	9	10	Final
(Ontario) Waterloo Warriors (Walker)	0	0	0	1	2	0	1	1	2	X	7
(Prince Edward Island) UPEI Panthers (Gallant) 🔨	0	1	1	0	0	1	0	0	0	X	3

Sheet D	1	2	3	4	5	6	7	8	9	10	Final
(Nova Scotia) Acadia Axemen (Mayhew)	0	1	1	0	0	0	0	1	0	0	3
(Ontario) Brock Badgers (Brandon) 🔨	1	0	0	0	2	0	2	0	1	0	6

Sheet F	1	2	3	4	5	6	7	8	9	10	Final
(Ontario) Carleton Ravens (Lewis)	0	0	1	0	1	0	0	2	0	X	4
Alberta Golden Bears (Bottcher) 🔨	2	1	0	1	0	0	4	0	1	X	9

Sheet H	1	2	3	4	5	6	7	8	9	10	Final
Manitoba Bisons (Bale)	1	0	0	2	0	1	0	1	0	1	6
(Manitoba) Winnipeg Wesmen (Birchard) 🔨	0	1	0	0	1	0	1	0	1	0	4

==== Draw 2 ====
Thursday, March 15, 9:00 am

Sheet B	1	2	3	4	5	6	7	8	9	10	Final
(Nova Scotia) Acadia Axemen (Mayhew)	1	0	0	1	0	0	3	0	1	1	7
Alberta Golden Bears (Bottcher) 🔨	0	2	2	0	2	1	0	1	0	0	8

Sheet D	1	2	3	4	5	6	7	8	9	10	Final
(Ontario) Waterloo Warriors (Walker)	0	2	0	2	2	0	0	1	0	3	10
(Manitoba) Winnipeg Wesmen (Birchard) 🔨	3	0	1	0	0	1	0	0	2	0	7

Sheet E	1	2	3	4	5	6	7	8	9	10	Final
Manitoba Bisons (Bale)	0	1	0	0	1	0	1	1	0	1	5
(Prince Edward Island) UPEI Panthers (Gallant) 🔨	1	0	1	0	0	1	0	0	1	0	4

Sheet G	1	2	3	4	5	6	7	8	9	10	11	Final
(Ontario) Carleton Ravens (Lewis)	1	0	1	0	0	0	0	0	3	0	0	5
(Ontario) Brock Badgers (Brandon) 🔨	0	1	0	0	0	1	1	2	0	0	1	6

==== Draw 3 ====
Thursday, March 15, 2:00 pm

Sheet A	1	2	3	4	5	6	7	8	9	10	Final
Manitoba Bisons (Bale) 🔨	2	0	0	0	2	0	1	0	0	3	8
(Ontario) Carleton Ravens (Lewis)	0	1	1	0	0	1	0	1	1	0	5

Sheet D	1	2	3	4	5	6	7	8	9	10	Final
(Prince Edward Island) UPEI Panthers (Gallant) 🔨	4	0	1	1	0	0	0	4	X	X	10
Alberta Golden Bears (Bottcher)	0	1	0	0	1	1	1	0	X	X	4

Sheet F	1	2	3	4	5	6	7	8	9	10	Final
(Manitoba) Winnipeg Wesmen (Birchard) 🔨	0	0	2	0	3	3	0	0	3	X	11
(Ontario) Brock Badgers (Brandon)	1	0	0	3	0	0	1	1	0	X	6

Sheet H	1	2	3	4	5	6	7	8	9	10	Final
(Ontario) Waterloo Warriors (Walker) 🔨	0	2	2	0	0	3	0	4	X	X	11
(Nova Scotia) Acadia Axemen (Mayhew)	0	0	0	1	0	0	1	0	X	X	2

==== Draw 4 ====
Thursday, March 15, 8:00 pm

Sheet A	1	2	3	4	5	6	7	8	9	10	Final
Alberta Golden Bears (Bottcher)	2	4	1	1	0	2	0	0	X	X	10
(Ontario) Brock Badgers (Brandon) 🔨	0	0	0	0	1	0	1	0	X	X	2

Sheet C	1	2	3	4	5	6	7	8	9	10	Final
Manitoba Bisons (Bale)	2	1	0	1	0	2	0	0	1	0	7
(Ontario) Waterloo Warriors (Walker) 🔨	0	0	3	0	3	0	1	2	0	0	9

Sheet E	1	2	3	4	5	6	7	8	9	10	Final
(Nova Scotia) Acadia Axemen (Mayhew)	0	0	4	0	0	0	0	1	0	X	5
(Ontario) Carleton Ravens (Lewis) 🔨	0	3	0	0	1	1	3	0	0	X	8

Sheet G	1	2	3	4	5	6	7	8	9	10	Final
(Manitoba) Winnipeg Wesmen (Birchard)	0	1	1	1	0	2	1	0	0	1	7
(Prince Edward Island) UPEI Panthers (Gallant) 🔨	2	0	0	0	2	0	0	1	0	0	5

==== Draw 5 ====
Friday, March 16, 2:00 pm

Sheet B	1	2	3	4	5	6	7	8	9	10	Final
(Ontario) Carleton Ravens (Lewis) 🔨	0	0	0	1	0	0	1	0	X	X	2
(Ontario) Waterloo Warriors (Walker)	2	1	0	0	2	1	0	2	X	X	8

Sheet C	1	2	3	4	5	6	7	8	9	10	Final
(Ontario) Brock Badgers (Brandon) 🔨	0	0	0	0	2	0	1	1	0	X	4
(Prince Edward Island) UPEI Panthers (Gallant)	2	0	1	1	0	3	0	0	2	X	9

Sheet E	1	2	3	4	5	6	7	8	9	10	Final
Alberta Golden Bears (Bottcher) 🔨	1	0	3	0	0	1	1	0	3	X	9
(Manitoba) Winnipeg Wesmen (Birchard)	0	2	0	1	0	0	0	1	0	X	4

Sheet G	1	2	3	4	5	6	7	8	9	10	Final
(Nova Scotia) Acadia Axemen (Mayhew) 🔨	3	0	1	0	1	0	0	2	0	1	8
Manitoba Bisons (Bale)	0	3	0	0	0	2	1	0	1	0	7

==== Draw 6 ====
Friday, March 16, 7:00 pm

Sheet B	1	2	3	4	5	6	7	8	9	10	Final
(Ontario) Brock Badgers (Brandon) 🔨	2	0	0	1	2	0	3	0	X	X	8
Manitoba Bisons (Bale)	0	0	2	0	0	1	0	0	X	X	3

Sheet C	1	2	3	4	5	6	7	8	9	10	Final
(Manitoba) Winnipeg Wesmen (Birchard) 🔨	0	1	0	0	1	0	1	1	0	1	5
(Ontario) Carleton Ravens (Lewis)	0	0	0	2	0	2	0	0	2	0	6

Sheet F	1	2	3	4	5	6	7	8	9	10	Final
(Prince Edward Island) UPEI Panthers (Gallant) 🔨	1	0	0	0	0	0	2	0	X	X	3
(Nova Scotia) Acadia Axemen (Mayhew)	0	1	2	1	3	3	0	1	X	X	11

Sheet G	1	2	3	4	5	6	7	8	9	10	Final
Alberta Golden Bears (Bottcher) 🔨	0	3	0	0	2	0	2	0	X	X	7
(Ontario) Waterloo Warriors (Walker)	0	0	0	1	0	1	0	1	X	X	3

==== Draw 7 ====
Saturday, March 17, 9:00 am

Sheet A	1	2	3	4	5	6	7	8	9	10	Final
(Manitoba) Winnipeg Wesmen (Birchard) 🔨	0	1	0	0	0	0	0	2	0	X	3
(Nova Scotia) Acadia Axemen (Mayhew)	0	0	2	0	1	2	1	0	1	X	7

Sheet E	1	2	3	4	5	6	7	8	9	10	Final
(Ontario) Brock Badgers (Brandon) 🔨	0	0	2	0	2	0	0	2	0	1	7
(Ontario) Waterloo Warriors (Walker)	1	1	0	0	0	0	1	0	1	0	4

Sheet F	1	2	3	4	5	6	7	8	9	10	Final
Alberta Golden Bears (Bottcher) 🔨	3	0	1	1	2	0	1	0	X	X	8
Manitoba Bisons (Bale)	0	0	0	0	0	2	0	1	X	X	3

Sheet H	1	2	3	4	5	6	7	8	9	10	Final
(Prince Edward Island) UPEI Panthers (Gallant) 🔨	0	0	3	2	0	2	0	1	2	X	10
(Ontario) Carleton Ravens (Lewis)	1	1	0	0	1	0	1	0	0	X	4

=== Playoffs ===
Semifinal			Final
			1	Alberta Golden Bears	7
2	(Ontario) Waterloo Warriors	8	2	(Ontario) Waterloo Warriors	1
3	(Ontario) Brock Badgers	5

==== Semifinal ====
Saturday, March 17, 7:00 pm

Sheet F	1	2	3	4	5	6	7	8	9	10	Final
(Ontario) Waterloo Warriors (Walker) 🔨	3	0	0	2	0	1	0	0	0	2	8
(Ontario) Brock Badgers (Brandon)	0	0	1	0	2	0	1	1	0	0	5

==== Final ====
Sunday, March 18, 2:00 pm

Sheet C	1	2	3	4	5	6	7	8	9	10	Final
Alberta Golden Bears (Bottcher) 🔨	0	3	0	1	0	3	0	0	X	X	7
(Ontario) Waterloo Warriors (Walker)	0	0	0	0	1	0	0	0	X	X	1

== Women ==
=== Teams ===
The teams are listed as follows:

Team	Skip	Third	Second	Lead	Alternate	Coach	University
Memorial Sea-Hawks	Erin Porter	Alysha Renouf	Julie Devereaux	Carolyn Suley		Rob Thomas	(Newfoundland and Labrador) Memorial University
Saint Mary's Huskies	Anita Casey	Sara Spafford	MacKenzie Proctor	Julia Williams		Jim Burgess	(Nova Scotia) Saint Mary's University
Manitoba Bisons	Alyssa Vandepoele	Heather Maxted	Sheyna Andries	Melanie Hunt	Krysten Karwacki	Bob Andries	University of Manitoba
Alberta Pandas	Kelly Erickson	Erica Ortt	Alison Kotylak	Linea Eby	Chelsea Duncan	Gary Coderre	University of Alberta
Wilfrid Laurier Golden Hawks	Laura Crocker	Sarah Wilkes	Jen Gates	Pamela Feldkamp	Cheryl Kreviazuk	Maurice Wilson	(Ontario) Wilfrid Laurier University
Western Ontario Mustangs	Caitlin Romain	Nicole Westlund	Holly Donaldson	Erin Daniel	Jenna Mason	Rory Munro	University of Western Ontario
Guelph Gryphons	Clancy Grandy	Katelyn Wasylkiw	Heather Cridland	Erin Jenkins	Andrea Sinclair	Jason Rice	(Ontario) University of Guelph
Brock Badgers	Joanne Curtis	Jessica Corrado	Lauren Wasylkiw	Jordan Brandwood	Erin Duffy	Murray Etherington	(Ontario) Brock University

=== Round-robin standings ===
Final round-robin standings

Key
Teams to Playoffs
Teams to Tiebreaker

University	Skip	W	L
(Ontario) Wilfrid Laurier Golden Hawks	Laura Crocker	6	1
Manitoba Bisons	Alyssa Vandepoele	5	2
Alberta Pandas	Kelly Erickson	4	3
(Ontario) Brock Badgers	Joanne Curtis	4	3
(Ontario) Guelph Gryphons	Clancy Grandy	3	4
(Nova Scotia) Saint Mary's Huskies	Anita Casey	2	5
(Newfoundland and Labrador) Memorial Sea-Hawks	Erin Porter	2	5
Western Ontario Mustangs	Caitlin Romain	2	5

=== Round-robin results ===
All times listed in Eastern Standard Time (UTC−5).

==== Draw 1 ====
Wednesday, March 14, 8:00 pm

Sheet B	1	2	3	4	5	6	7	8	9	10	Final
(Ontario) Wilfrid Laurier Golden Hawks (Crocker) 🔨	0	4	0	1	0	5	2	0	2	X	14
(Newfoundland and Labrador) Memorial Sea-Hawks (Porter)	0	0	3	0	1	0	0	3	0	X	7

Sheet C	1	2	3	4	5	6	7	8	9	10	Final
(Nova Scotia) Saint Mary's Huskies (Casey) 🔨	0	0	2	0	0	0	1	0	0	X	3
(Ontario) Brock Badgers (Curtis)	2	2	0	3	3	2	0	1	0	X	13

Sheet E	1	2	3	4	5	6	7	8	9	10	Final
Western Ontario Mustangs (Romain) 🔨	0	0	1	0	0	2	0	3	0	4	10
Manitoba Bisons (Vandepoele)	0	1	0	2	1	0	2	0	1	0	7

Sheet G	1	2	3	4	5	6	7	8	9	10	Final
Alberta Pandas (Erickson) 🔨	0	0	0	2	0	2	0	0	1	0	5
(Ontario) Guelph Gryphons (Grandy)	2	0	0	0	1	0	2	2	0	1	8

==== Draw 2 ====
Thursday, March 15, 10:00 am

Sheet A	1	2	3	4	5	6	7	8	9	10	Final
(Nova Scotia) Saint Mary's Huskies (Casey)	1	0	2	0	1	0	0	0	0	0	4
Manitoba Bisons (Vandepoele) 🔨	0	2	0	1	0	0	1	2	3	0	9

Sheet C	1	2	3	4	5	6	7	8	9	10	Final
(Ontario) Wilfrid Laurier Golden Hawks (Crocker)	0	1	0	1	1	2	0	0	0	2	7
(Ontario) Guelph Gryphons (Grandy) 🔨	0	0	2	0	0	0	2	1	1	0	6

Sheet F	1	2	3	4	5	6	7	8	9	10	Final
Alberta Pandas (Erickson)	1	1	0	1	0	1	0	2	1	1	8
(Newfoundland and Labrador) Memorial Sea-Hawks (Porter) 🔨	0	0	1	0	3	0	2	0	0	0	6

Sheet H	1	2	3	4	5	6	7	8	9	10	11	Final
Western Ontario Mustangs (Romain)	0	2	0	0	0	1	2	0	0	1	0	6
(Ontario) Brock Badgers (Curtis) 🔨	1	0	1	1	0	0	0	2	1	0	1	7

==== Draw 3 ====
Thursday, March 15, 3:00 pm

Sheet B	1	2	3	4	5	6	7	8	9	10	Final
Alberta Pandas (Erickson) 🔨	2	2	1	0	1	2	0	1	X	X	9
Western Ontario Mustangs (Romain)	0	0	0	2	0	0	2	0	X	X	4

Sheet C	1	2	3	4	5	6	7	8	9	10	Final
(Newfoundland and Labrador) Memorial Sea-Hawks (Porter) 🔨	0	1	0	0	0	2	0	1	X	X	4
Manitoba Bisons (Vandepoele)	1	0	4	1	1	0	3	0	X	X	11

Sheet E	1	2	3	4	5	6	7	8	9	10	Final
(Ontario) Guelph Gryphons (Grandy) 🔨	0	1	0	0	0	0	0	0	X	X	1
(Ontario) Brock Badgers (Curtis)	0	0	1	2	2	1	1	1	X	X	8

Sheet G	1	2	3	4	5	6	7	8	9	10	Final
(Ontario) Wilfrid Laurier Golden Hawks (Crocker) 🔨	0	2	4	0	3	0	0	0	3	X	12
(Nova Scotia) Saint Mary's Huskies (Casey)	0	0	0	1	0	2	1	1	0	X	5

==== Draw 4 ====
Thursday, March 15, 8:00 pm

Sheet B	1	2	3	4	5	6	7	8	9	10	Final
Manitoba Bisons (Vandepoele)	0	2	2	0	1	3	0	0	X	X	8
(Ontario) Brock Badgers (Curtis) 🔨	0	0	0	1	0	0	1	1	X	X	3

Sheet D	1	2	3	4	5	6	7	8	9	10	Final
Alberta Pandas (Erickson) 🔨	0	0	2	0	0	0	2	0	X	X	4
(Ontario) Wilfrid Laurier Golden Hawks (Crocker)	0	1	0	2	2	2	0	2	X	X	9

Sheet F	1	2	3	4	5	6	7	8	9	10	Final
(Nova Scotia) Saint Mary's Huskies (Casey) 🔨	2	0	0	0	1	0	2	3	0	2	10
Western Ontario Mustangs (Romain)	0	1	1	2	0	1	0	0	3	0	8

Sheet H	1	2	3	4	5	6	7	8	9	10	11	Final
(Ontario) Guelph Gryphons (Grandy) 🔨	0	1	1	1	1	1	0	1	0	1	0	7
(Newfoundland and Labrador) Memorial Sea-Hawks (Porter)	1	0	0	0	0	0	3	0	3	0	1	8

==== Draw 5 ====
Friday, March 16, 2:00 pm

Sheet A	1	2	3	4	5	6	7	8	9	10	Final
Western Ontario Mustangs (Romain) 🔨	1	0	0	1	0	0	1	0	X	X	3
(Ontario) Wilfrid Laurier Golden Hawks (Crocker)	0	1	1	0	1	2	0	4	X	X	9

Sheet D	1	2	3	4	5	6	7	8	9	10	Final
(Ontario) Brock Badgers (Curtis) 🔨	0	0	1	0	0	0	3	1	0	0	5
(Newfoundland and Labrador) Memorial Sea-Hawks (Porter)	1	1	0	1	2	1	0	0	2	0	8

Sheet F	1	2	3	4	5	6	7	8	9	10	Final
Manitoba Bisons (Vandepoele) 🔨	0	2	0	2	0	0	1	4	1	0	10
(Ontario) Guelph Gryphons (Grandy)	3	0	3	0	1	1	0	0	0	0	8

Sheet H	1	2	3	4	5	6	7	8	9	10	Final
(Nova Scotia) Saint Mary's Huskies (Casey) 🔨	0	0	0	1	1	1	0	1	X	X	4
Alberta Pandas (Erickson)	3	3	2	0	0	0	1	0	X	X	9

==== Draw 6 ====
Friday, March 16, 7:00 pm

Sheet A	1	2	3	4	5	6	7	8	9	10	Final
(Ontario) Brock Badgers (Curtis) 🔨	2	0	1	0	0	3	0	2	0	0	8
Alberta Pandas (Erickson)	0	1	0	2	1	0	2	0	2	1	9

Sheet D	1	2	3	4	5	6	7	8	9	10	Final
(Ontario) Guelph Gryphons (Grandy) 🔨	0	4	0	1	0	0	2	0	0	2	9
Western Ontario Mustangs (Romain)	1	0	1	0	1	1	0	3	0	0	7

Sheet E	1	2	3	4	5	6	7	8	9	10	Final
(Newfoundland and Labrador) Memorial Sea-Hawks (Porter) 🔨	0	1	1	0	1	2	0	0	0	0	5
(Nova Scotia) Saint Mary's Huskies (Casey)	0	0	0	1	0	0	3	1	0	2	7

Sheet H	1	2	3	4	5	6	7	8	9	10	Final
Manitoba Bisons (Vandepoele) 🔨	0	1	0	0	0	1	0	2	0	X	4
(Ontario) Wilfrid Laurier Golden Hawks (Crocker)	2	0	1	1	1	0	1	0	1	X	7

==== Draw 7 ====
Saturday, March 17, 9:00 am

Sheet B	1	2	3	4	5	6	7	8	9	10	Final
(Ontario) Guelph Gryphons (Grandy) 🔨	0	0	2	0	2	1	1	0	0	1	7
(Nova Scotia) Saint Mary's Huskies (Casey)	3	1	0	1	0	0	0	1	0	0	6

Sheet C	1	2	3	4	5	6	7	8	9	10	11	Final
(Ontario) Brock Badgers (Curtis) 🔨	0	2	0	0	1	0	0	1	0	1	1	6
(Ontario) Wilfrid Laurier Golden Hawks (Crocker)	1	0	1	1	0	1	0	0	1	0	0	5

Sheet D	1	2	3	4	5	6	7	8	9	10	Final
Manitoba Bisons (Vandepoele) 🔨	0	0	2	0	0	1	1	1	2	1	8
Alberta Pandas (Erickson)	1	2	0	1	2	0	0	0	0	0	6

Sheet G	1	2	3	4	5	6	7	8	9	10	Final
(Newfoundland and Labrador) Memorial Sea-Hawks (Porter) 🔨	3	0	1	1	0	0	1	0	0	X	6
Western Ontario Mustangs (Romain)	0	1	0	0	3	4	0	1	3	X	12

=== Tiebreaker ===
Saturday, March 17, 2:00 pm

Team	1	2	3	4	5	6	7	8	9	10	Final
Alberta Pandas (Erickson) 🔨	0	0	1	0	0	0	1	0	2	0	4
(Ontario) Brock Badgers (Curtis)	0	0	0	2	0	1	0	1	0	2	6

=== Playoffs ===
Semifinal			Final
			1	(Ontario) Wilfrid Laurier Golden Hawks	9
2	Manitoba Bisons	3	3	(Ontario) Brock Badgers	2
3	(Ontario) Brock Badgers	8

==== Semifinal ====
Saturday, March 17, 7:00 pm

Sheet D	1	2	3	4	5	6	7	8	9	10	Final
Manitoba Bisons (Vandenpoele) 🔨	0	2	0	0	1	0	0	0	X	X	3
(Ontario) Brock Badgers (Curtis)	0	0	0	3	0	3	1	1	X	X	8

==== Final ====
Sunday, March 18, 2:00 pm

Sheet E	1	2	3	4	5	6	7	8	9	10	Final
(Ontario) Wilfrid Laurier Golden Hawks (Crocker) 🔨	2	0	1	1	4	0	0	1	X	X	9
(Ontario) Brock Badgers (Curtis)	0	1	0	0	0	1	0	0	X	X	2

== Awards ==
The all-Canadian teams and award winners are as follows:

=== CIS All-Canadian Teams ===
Women

First Team

- Skip: Laura Crocker, Wilfrid Laurier University
- Third: Sarah Wilkes, Wilfrid Laurier University
- Second: Jen Gates, Wilfrid Laurier University
- Lead: Cheryl Kreviazuk, Wilfrid Laurier University

Second Team

- Skip: Joanne Curtis, Brock University
- Third: Jessica Corrado, Brock University
- Second: Krysten Karwacki, University of Manitoba
- Lead: Erica Trickett, Memorial University

Men

First Team

- Skip: Jake Walker, University of Waterloo
- Third: Edward Cyr, University of Waterloo
- Second: Brad Thiessen, University of Alberta
- Lead: Karrick Martin, University of Alberta

Second Team

- Skip: Brendan Bottcher, University of Alberta
- Third: Mick Lizmore, University of Alberta
- Second: Geoff Chambers, University of Waterloo
- Lead: Connor MacPhee, University of Prince Edward Island

=== R.W. Pugh Fair Play Awards ===
Women

- Julie Devereaux, Memorial University

Men

- Joshua Drews, University of Winnipeg

=== CIS Coach of the Year ===
Women

- Maurice Wilson, Wilfrid Laurier University

Men

- Len Komyshyn, University of Winnipeg

== See also ==
- Curling
- Canadian Curling Association
- University and college curling
- 2013 Winter Universiade
