= Caitlin Romain =

Canadian curler

Caitlin Romain (born c. 1992) is a Canadian curler originally from Iroquois Falls, Ontario. She currently skips a team on the World Curling Tour.

Romain won the Northern Ontario bantam championship in 2009 before moving to southern Ontario to attend the University of Western Ontario. She skipped the University of Western Ontario team at the 2012 CIS/CCA Curling Championships going 2-5 and at the 2013 CIS/CCA Curling Championships, going 1-6. Also in 2013, Romain lost in the final of the 2013 Pepsi Ontario Junior Curling Championships to Jamie Sinclair.

Romain and her rink of Kendall Haymes, Kerilynn Mathers and Cheryl Kreviazuk joined the World Curling Tour in 2014. They qualified for their first provincial championship in 2015. At the 2015 Ontario Scotties Tournament of Hearts, they finished with a 4–5 record.
