= Hollie Duncan =

Canadian curler (born 1987)

- Curler
- Born: January 6, 1987 (age 39); Toronto, Ontario, Canada

Team
- Curling club: Woodstock CC, Woodstock, ON
- Skip: Megan Balsdon
- Fourth: Hollie Duncan
- Second: Rachelle Strybosch
- Lead: Tess Guyatt

Curling career
- Member Association: Ontario
- Hearts: 2 (2018, 2022)
- Top CTRS ranking: 9th (2021–22)
Medal record
Women's curling
Representing Canada
Winter Universiade
Silver medal – second place	2009 Harbin

Hollie Duncan (born January 6, 1987, in Toronto, Ontario, as Hollie Nicol) is a Canadian curler. She currently throws fourth stones on her team, which is skipped by Megan Balsdon.

== Career ==
=== Juniors ===
As a bantam-aged curler, Duncan skipped her Unionville Curling Club rink to a provincial Bantam championship in 2002. In 2004, Duncan represented the Bayview Country Club when her team won the Ontario Winter Games championship. Duncan wrapped up her junior career by winning the 2007 provincial junior championship. Her rink of Laura Hickey, Karen Sagle and Hilary McDermott from the Kitchener-Waterloo Granite Club would then go on to represent Ontario at the 2007 Canadian Junior Curling Championships. At the juniors, Duncan led Ontario to a 7–5 record, which was not good enough to make the playoffs. Duncan had a successful university curling career, playing for Wilfrid Laurier University. Duncan would win two national championships for Laurier, in 2008 and 2009. Duncan represented Canada at the 2009 Winter Universiade, where she won a silver medal for Canada.

=== Women's ===
After juniors, Duncan joined the Kirsten Wall rink in 2010 as her third. The team would play in Duncan's lone Grand Slam ever to date, the 2010 Sobeys Slam, in which they were eliminated after posting a 3–3 record. In 2012, she joined the Jill Mouzar rink, playing lead. The team would play in Duncan's first provincial championship, at the 2013 Ontario Scotties Tournament of Hearts where they finished with a 3–6 record. When Mouzar (now Brothers) moved back to her native Nova Scotia in 2013, Duncan moved to skipping the team. Duncan would lead her team to an appearance at the 2014 Ontario Scotties Tournament of Hearts, finishing the event with a 2–7 record.

Duncan took two seasons off from competitive curling, returning in 2016, skipping a rink of Chantal Allan, Cheryl Kreviazuk and Karen Sagle. Allan was replaced with Stephanie LeDrew in 2017. The team would win the 2018 Ontario Scotties Tournament of Hearts, Duncan's first provincial title, sending her to her first Scotties Tournament of Hearts in 2018. There, her team posted a 4–3 round robin record which qualified them for the tiebreaker against Newfoundland and Labrador's Stacie Curtis. Ontario scored three in the ninth end and stole two in the tenth for a 11–8 win and a spot in the Championship Pool. They would not win any more games, finishing the tournament with a 4–7 record. The following season, she failed to qualify for the playoffs at the 2019 Ontario Scotties Tournament of Hearts after losing the tiebreaker 10–5 to Julie Tippin.

Duncan started the 2019–20 season with a quarterfinal finish at the 2019 Cameron's Brewing Oakville Fall Classic despite qualifying for the playoffs as the number one seed. Also that season, her team qualified for the 2020 Ontario Scotties Tournament of Hearts and made it to the final where they lost to Rachel Homan.

Duncan left her team after the season to join the Megan Balsdon rink as their new skip. The team only played in one event during the 2020–21 season due to the COVID-19 pandemic. They reached the final of the Stu Sells Oakville Tankard, losing to Team Jennifer Jones in an extra end.

Duncan, with new teammates Megan Balsdon, Rachelle Strybosch and Tess Bobbie began the 2021–22 season with a semifinal finish at the 2021 Oakville Labour Day Classic where they lost to event winners Team Tracy Fleury. In their next event, the team won the Stu Sells Oakville Tankard, defeating the Kerry Galusha rink in the final. The following week, they lost in the final of the KW Fall Classic to Team Galusha. They responded with their second event title of the season at the Stu Sells Toronto Tankard where they defeated Team Shannon Jay in the final. Because of their successes on tour, Team Duncan had enough points to qualify for the 2021 Canadian Olympic Curling Pre-Trials. At the Pre-Trials, the team finished with a 3–3 record, failing to qualify for the championship round. Team Duncan played in two more tour events during the season, missing the playoffs of the 2021 National Grand Slam of Curling event and reaching the quarterfinals of the DeKalb Superspiel. Due to the postponement of the 2022 Ontario Scotties Tournament of Hearts due to the COVID-19 pandemic in Ontario, CurlON appointed Team Rachel Homan to represent the province at the 2022 Scotties Tournament of Hearts. However, because Homan herself was chosen to represent Canada at the 2022 Winter Olympics in mixed doubles, Team Duncan were awarded the spot as Team Ontario at the national championship, with Team Homan earning one of the three Wild Card spots. At the Hearts, Team Duncan started with four straight losses before winning their last four games, finishing the event with a 4–4 record.

Team Duncan began the 2022–23 curling season playing in the 2022 PointsBet Invitational, where her rink was knocked out in the round of 16 by Team Penny Barker. The team then played in the 2022 National, where they lost all four of their games. They then played in the 2022 Tour Challenge where they finished the group round with a 2–2 record, before losing in a tiebreaker game to Isabella Wranå. Playing in those tournaments was good enough to qualify the team for the 2023 Ontario Scotties Tournament of Hearts.

== Personal life ==
Duncan works as a lawyer and decision writer with the Royal College of Dental Surgeons of Ontario. She is married to Tim Duncan, and has two sons.

== Grand Slam record ==
Key
C	Champion
F	Lost in Final
SF	Lost in Semifinal
QF	Lost in Quarterfinals
R16	Lost in the round of 16
Q	Did not advance to playoffs
T2	Played in Tier 2 event
DNP	Did not participate in event
N/A	Not a Grand Slam event that season

Event	2021–22	2022–23	2023–24	2024–25	2025–26
The National	Q	Q	DNP	DNP	DNP
Tour Challenge	N/A	Q	DNP	DNP	DNP
Canadian Open	N/A	DNP	DNP	DNP	T2

=== Former events ===
Event	2010–11
Sobeys Slam	Q
