= Krysten Karwacki =

Canadian curler

- Curler
- Born: April 30, 1991 (age 35); Winnipeg, Manitoba

Team
- Curling club: Nutana CC, Saskatoon, SK
- Skip: Selena Njegovan
- Third: Erin Pincott
- Second: Margot Flemming
- Lead: Krysten Karwacki

Curling career
- Member Association: Manitoba (2010–2022; 2024–present); Saskatchewan (2022–2024)
- Hearts: 7 (2017, 2021, 2022, 2023, 2024, 2025, 2026)
- World Championship: 4 (2021, 2022, 2023, 2026)
- Top CTRS ranking: 2nd (2024–25)
- Grand Slam victories: 1 (2024 Tour Challenge)
Medal record
Representing Canada
World Championships
Silver medal – second place	2026 Calgary
Bronze medal – third place	2022 Prince George
Bronze medal – third place	2023 Sandviken
Scotties Tournament of Hearts
Gold medal – first place	2021 Calgary
Gold medal – first place	2022 Thunder Bay
Gold medal – first place	2023 Kamloops
Gold medal – first place	2026 Mississauga
Representing Manitoba
Canadian Olympic Curling Trials
Bronze medal – third place	2025 Halifax
Scotties Tournament of Hearts
Silver medal – second place	2017 St. Catharines
Silver medal – second place	2025 Thunder Bay

Krysten Karwacki (born April 30, 1991) is a Canadian curler from Winnipeg, Manitoba. She currently plays lead on Team Selena Njegovan. She is the former lead for the Cathy Overton-Clapham team and most recently served as the long-time alternate on Team Kerri Einarson. Karwacki has won four national championships as the Einarson team's fifth in 2021, 2022, 2023 and 2026.

== Career Highlights ==
- Semifinalist at the 2011 Canadian Junior Curling Championships
- Finalist of the 2012 Atkins Curling Supplies Women's Classic
- Women's Semifinalist of the 2012 CIS/CCA Curling Championships
- Women's Champion of the 2013 CIS/CCA Curling Championships
- Played lead in the 2013-14 curling season for Breanne Meakin
- 2017 Scotties Silver Medallist as alternate for Michelle Englot
- 2021 Scotties, 2022 Scotties, and 2023 Scotties Gold Medallist as alternate for Kerri Einarson
- 2024 Scotties, played lead for Kerri Einarson after regular lead Briane Harris was deemed ineligible to play by Curling Canada.
- 2024 Tour Challenge Grand Slam of Curling champion with Kerri Einarson
- 2025 Scotties, played lead for Kerri Einarson
- 2026 Scotties Gold Medallist as alternate for Kerri Einarson

== Personal life ==
Karwacki works as a marketing director for Gravity Management.
