= 2013 CIS/CCA Curling Championships =

- Host city: Kamloops, British Columbia
- Arena: Kamloops Curling Club
- Dates: March 20–24
- Men's winner: (Ontario) Waterloo Warriors
- Skip: Jake Walker
- Third: Edward Cyr
- Second: Jordan Moreau
- Lead: James Freeman
- Alternate: Nathan Ransom
- Coach: Scott Allen
- Finalist: Alberta Golden Bears (Brendan Bottcher)
- Women's winner: Manitoba Bisons
- Skip: Breanne Meakin
- Third: Ashley Howard
- Second: Selena Kaatz
- Lead: Krysten Karwacki
- Coach: Tom Clasper
- Finalist: Alberta Pandas (Kelsey Rocque)

The 2013 CIS/CCA Curling Championships were held from March 20 to 24 at the Kamloops Curling Club in Kamloops, British Columbia. The host university of the event was Thompson Rivers University in Kamloops.

== Men ==
=== Teams ===
The teams are listed as follows:

Team	Skip	Third	Second	Lead	Alternate	Coach	University
Thompson Rivers WolfPack	Darren Nelson	Russ Koffski	Jared Jenkins	Michael Hiram	David Gore	Ray Olsen	(British Columbia) Thompson Rivers University
Dalhousie Tigers	Lee Buott	Tyler Gamble	Andrew Komlodi	Peter Andersen		Cindy Tucker	(Nova Scotia) Dalhousie University
Acadia Axemen	Robert Mayhew	Michael Brophy	Alex Trites	Ben Creaser		Alan Mayhew	(Nova Scotia) Acadia University
Alberta Golden Bears	Brendan Bottcher	Mick Lizmore	Brad Thiessen	Parker Konschuh	Evan Asmussen	Rob Krepps	University of Alberta
Manitoba Bisons	Steen Sigurdson	Trevor Calvert	Ian McMillan	Brett Sigurdson		Barrie Sigurdson	University of Manitoba
Waterloo Warriors	Jake Walker	Edward Cyr	Jordan Moreau	James Freeman	Nathan Ransom	Scott Allen	(Ontario) University of Waterloo
Trent Excalibur	Mike Bryson	Jason Whitehill	Adam Gagne	Mike Kean	Chris Whitehill	Brad Kidd	(Ontario) Trent University
Carleton Ravens	Brett Lyon-Hatcher	Ben Miskew	Greg Bridges	Cole Lyon-Hatcher	Ryan McCrady	Art Miskew	(Ontario) Carleton University

=== Round Robin Standings ===
Final Round Robin Standings

Key
Teams to Playoffs

Team	Skip	W	L
Alberta Golden Bears	Brendan Bottcher	6	1
(Ontario) Waterloo Warriors	Jake Walker	5	2
(British Columbia) Thompson Rivers WolfPack	Darren Nelson	4	3
(Nova Scotia) Acadia Axemen	Robert Mayhew	3	4
(Nova Scotia) Dalhousie Tigers	Lee Buott	3	4
Manitoba Bisons	Steen Sigurdson	3	4
(Ontario) Trent Excalibur	Mike Bryson	3	4
(Ontario) Carleton Ravens	Brett Lyon-Hatcher	1	6

=== Round Robin Results ===
All draw times listed in Pacific Daylight Time (UTC−7).

==== Draw 1 ====
Wednesday, March 24, 10:00 am

Sheet 1	1	2	3	4	5	6	7	8	9	10	Final
(Ontario) Waterloo Warriors (Walker)	1	0	2	0	2	2	0	2	X	X	9
(Nova Scotia) Dalhousie Tigers (Buott)	0	1	0	1	0	0	1	0	X	X	3

Sheet 4	1	2	3	4	5	6	7	8	9	10	Final
(Nova Scotia) Acadia Axemen (Mayhew)	0	1	3	1	0	1	0	0	2	X	8
(British Columbia) Thompson Rivers WolfPack (Nelson)	0	0	0	0	2	0	3	0	0	X	5

Sheet 6	1	2	3	4	5	6	7	8	9	10	Final
(Ontario) Trent Excalibur (Bryson)	0	1	0	1	0	0	2	0	X	X	4
Alberta Golden Bears (Bottcher)	2	0	3	0	0	2	0	3	X	X	10

Sheet 8	1	2	3	4	5	6	7	8	9	10	Final
Manitoba Bisons (Sigurdson)	1	0	0	0	0	3	0	1	0	X	5
(Ontario) Carleton Ravens (Lyon-Hatcher)	0	2	2	0	2	0	1	0	2	X	9

==== Draw 2 ====
Wednesday, March 24, 3:00 pm

Sheet 2	1	2	3	4	5	6	7	8	9	10	Final
(Nova Scotia) Acadia Axemen (Mayhew)	0	0	1	0	0	1	0	1	1	X	4
Alberta Golden Bears (Bottcher)	2	2	0	0	3	0	0	0	0	X	7

Sheet 4	1	2	3	4	5	6	7	8	9	10	Final
(Ontario) Waterloo Warriors (Walker)	0	0	2	0	0	3	0	1	2	X	8
(Ontario) Carleton Ravens (Lyon-Hatcher)	0	2	0	1	1	0	1	0	0	X	5

Sheet 5	1	2	3	4	5	6	7	8	9	10	Final
Manitoba Bisons (Sigurdson)	0	2	0	0	0	1	0	0	X	X	3
(Nova Scotia) Dalhousie Tigers (Buott)	3	0	1	1	1	0	1	2	X	X	9

Sheet 7	1	2	3	4	5	6	7	8	9	10	11	Final
(Ontario) Trent Excalibur (Bryson)	1	0	2	1	0	2	0	0	1	0	0	7
(British Columbia) Thompson Rivers WolfPack (Nelson)	0	4	0	0	1	0	0	1	0	1	3	10

==== Draw 3 ====
Thursday, March 25, 2:00 pm

Sheet 1	1	2	3	4	5	6	7	8	9	10	Final
Manitoba Bisons (Sigurdson)	0	2	0	1	0	1	0	0	0	3	7
(Ontario) Trent Excalibur (Bryson)	1	0	1	0	2	0	0	1	1	0	6

Sheet 4	1	2	3	4	5	6	7	8	9	10	Final
(Nova Scotia) Dalhousie Tigers (Buott)	0	1	0	1	0	1	0	1	0	X	4
Alberta Golden Bears (Bottcher)	3	0	1	0	2	0	1	0	1	X	8

Sheet 6	1	2	3	4	5	6	7	8	9	10	Final
(Ontario) Carleton Ravens (Lyon-Hatcher)	0	0	2	0	0	1	0	2	0	X	5
(British Columbia) Thompson Rivers WolfPack (Nelson)	0	3	0	0	3	0	3	0	1	X	10

Sheet 8	1	2	3	4	5	6	7	8	9	10	Final
(Ontario) Waterloo Warriors (Walker)	0	0	2	0	0	3	0	1	0	0	6
(Nova Scotia) Acadia Axemen (Mayhew)	1	0	0	1	0	01	0	1	1		5

==== Draw 4 ====
Thursday, March 25, 7:00 pm

Sheet 1	1	2	3	4	5	6	7	8	9	10	Final
Alberta Golden Bears (Bottcher)	0	0	1	0	1	1	0	0	2	X	5
(British Columbia) Thompson Rivers WolfPack (Nelson)	0	0	0	1	0	0	0	2	0	X	3

Sheet 3	1	2	3	4	5	6	7	8	9	10	Final
Manitoba Bisons (Sigurdson)	0	0	0	0	0	0	1	0	X	X	1
(Ontario) Waterloo Warriors (Walker)	0	2	1	2	1	1	0	1	X	X	8

Sheet 4	1	2	3	4	5	6	7	8	9	10	Final
(Ontario) Trent Excalibur (Bryson)	0	0	1	0	0	1	0	1	X	X	3
(Nova Scotia) Acadia Axemen (Mayhew)	1	1	0	3	2	0	1	0	X	X	8

Sheet 7	1	2	3	4	5	6	7	8	9	10	Final
(Ontario) Carleton Ravens (Lyon-Hatcher)	0	0	0	1	0	0	0	1	X	X	2
(Nova Scotia) Dalhousie Tigers (Buott)	1	2	1	0	2	1	1	0	X	X	8

==== Draw 5 ====
Friday, March 26, 9:00 am

Sheet 2	1	2	3	4	5	6	7	8	9	10	Final
(Ontario) Trent Excalibur (Bryson)	1	1	0	2	0	0	0	0	0	2	6
(Ontario) Waterloo Warriors (Walker)	0	0	2	0	1	0	1	1	0	0	5

Sheet 3	1	2	3	4	5	6	7	8	9	10	Final
(British Columbia) Thompson Rivers WolfPack (Nelson)	2	2	0	0	1	1	0	0	0	1	7
(Nova Scotia) Dalhousie Tigers (Buott)	0	0	3	0	0	0	1	1	1	0	6

Sheet 5	1	2	3	4	5	6	7	8	9	10	Final
Alberta Golden Bears (Bottcher)	2	1	0	0	2	0	4	0	X	X	9
(Ontario) Carleton Ravens (Lyon-Hatcher)	0	0	0	1	0	2	0	1	X	X	4

Sheet 7	1	2	3	4	5	6	7	8	9	10	Final
(Nova Scotia) Acadia Axemen (Mayhew)	1	0	0	0	3	0	1	0	2	0	7
Manitoba Bisons (Sigurdson)	0	0	2	1	0	3	0	2	0	1	9

==== Draw 6 ====
Friday, March 26, 2:00 pm

Sheet 2	1	2	3	4	5	6	7	8	9	10	11	Final
(British Columbia) Thompson Rivers WolfPack (Nelson)	0	0	0	0	1	1	0	0	1	1	0	4
Manitoba Bisons (Sigurdson)	0	0	0	3	0	0	0	1	0	0	1	5

Sheet 3	1	2	3	4	5	6	7	8	9	10	Final
(Ontario) Carleton Ravens (Lyon-Hatcher)	1	0	2	0	1	0	0	1	0	X	5
(Ontario) Trent Excalibur (Bryson)	0	2	0	2	0	2	1	0	3	X	10

Sheet 6	1	2	3	4	5	6	7	8	9	10	Final
(Nova Scotia) Dalhousie Tigers (Buott)	0	2	1	0	2	0	0	0	0	2	7
(Nova Scotia) Acadia Axemen (Mayhew)	1	0	0	2	0	1	0	1	1	0	6

Sheet 7	1	2	3	4	5	6	7	8	9	10	Final
Alberta Golden Bears (Bottcher)	0	1	0	0	0	1	0	2	0	1	5
(Ontario) Waterloo Warriors (Walker)	2	0	0	2	1	0	1	0	0	0	6

==== Draw 7 ====
Saturday, March 27, 9:00 am

Sheet 1	1	2	3	4	5	6	7	8	9	10	Final
(Ontario) Carleton Ravens (Lyon-Hatcher)	0	0	1	0	0	1	0	3	0	X	5
(Nova Scotia) Acadia Axemen (Mayhew)	0	4	0	3	0	0	1	0	1	X	9

Sheet 3	1	2	3	4	5	6	7	8	9	10	Final
Alberta Golden Bears (Bottcher)	0	3	0	4	0	0	1	0	1	X	9
Manitoba Bisons (Sigurdson)	0	0	1	0	1	1	0	2	0	X	5

Sheet 5	1	2	3	4	5	6	7	8	9	10	Final
(British Columbia) Thompson Rivers WolfPack (Nelson)	0	0	0	1	1	1	0	2	0	2	7
(Ontario) Waterloo Warriors (Walker)	1	1	0	0	0	0	2	0	2	0	6

Sheet 8	1	2	3	4	5	6	7	8	9	10	Final
(Nova Scotia) Dalhousie Tigers (Buott)	0	0	3	0	0	0	2	0	0	X	5
(Ontario) Trent Excalibur (Bryson)	0	2	0	2	1	1	0	0	2	X	8

=== Playoffs ===
Semifinal			Final
			1	Alberta Golden Bears	5
2	(Ontario) Waterloo Warriors	7	2	(Ontario) Waterloo Warriors	7
3	(British Columbia) Thompson Rivers WolfPack	6

==== Semifinal ====
Saturday, March 23, 7:00 pm

Sheet 4	1	2	3	4	5	6	7	8	9	10	Final
(Ontario) Waterloo Warriors (Walker)	1	0	3	0	0	1	0	1	0	1	7
(British Columbia) Thompson Rivers WolfPack (Nelson)	0	2	0	0	1	0	1	0	2	0	6

==== Final ====
Sunday, March 24, 2:00 pm

Sheet 5	1	2	3	4	5	6	7	8	9	10	Final
Alberta Golden Bears (Bottcher)	0	1	0	0	0	2	0	1	0	1	5
(Ontario) Waterloo Warriors (Walker)	0	0	2	0	1	0	3	0	1	0	7

== Women ==
=== Teams ===
The teams are listed as follows:

Team	Skip	Third	Second	Lead	Alternate	Coach	University
Thompson Rivers WolfPack	Tiffany Krausher	Alyssa Kyllo	Ashley Nordin	Kym Edgeworth	Katie Hill	Brenda Nordin	(British Columbia) Thompson Rivers University
Saint Mary's Huskies	Sara Spafford	Amanda Colter	Anita Casey	Mackenzie Proctor		Marie Christianson	(Nova Scotia) Saint Mary's University
UPEI Panthers	Veronica Smith	Jane DiCarlo	Emily Gray	Aleya Quilty		Paul Smith	University of Prince Edward Island
Alberta Pandas	Kelsey Rocque	Keely Brown	Erica Ortt	Taylor McDonald	Alison Kotylak	Garry Coderre	University of Alberta
Manitoba Bisons	Breanne Meakin	Ashley Howard	Selena Kaatz	Krysten Karwacki		Tom Clasper	University of Manitoba
Western Ontario Mustangs	Caitlin Romain	Jackie Rivington	Chantal Allan	Nicole Westlund	Stephanie Thompson	Rory Munro	University of Western Ontario
McMaster Marauders	Ginger Coyle	Rachelle Vink	Robyn Murphy	Laura Brown	Samantha McIntyre	Chris Malcolmson	(Ontario) McMaster University
Guelph Gryphons	Jaimee Gardner	Katelyn Wasylkiw	Heather Cridland	Erin Jenkins	Emilie Metcalfe	Jason Rice	(Ontario) University of Guelph

=== Round Robin Standings ===
Final Round Robin Standings

Team	Skip	W	L
Manitoba Bisons	Breanne Meakin	7	0
Alberta Pandas	Kelsey Rocque	6	1
(Nova Scotia) Saint Mary's Huskies	Sara Spafford	5	2
(Ontario) McMaster Marauders	Ginger Coyle	3	4
(Ontario) Guelph Gryphons	Jaimee Gardner	2	5
(British Columbia) Thompson Rivers WolfPack	Tiffany Krausher	2	5
(Prince Edward Island) UPEI Panthers	Veronica Smith	2	5
Western Ontario Mustangs	Caitlin Romain	1	6

=== Round Robin Results ===
All draw times listed in Pacific Daylight Time (UTC−7).

==== Draw 1 ====
Wednesday, March 24, 10:00 am

Sheet 2	1	2	3	4	5	6	7	8	9	10	Final
Western Ontario Mustangs (Romain)	0	2	0	0	2	1	2	1	0	0	8
(Nova Scotia) Saint Mary's Huskies (Spafford)	2	0	4	1	0	0	0	0	2	1	10

Sheet 3	1	2	3	4	5	6	7	8	9	10	Final
(Prince Edward Island) UPEI Panthers (Smith)	1	0	0	2	0	1	0	1	0	X	5
(British Columbia) Thompson Rivers WolfPack (Krausher)	0	2	0	0	1	0	1	0	4	X	8

Sheet 5	1	2	3	4	5	6	7	8	9	10	11	Final
(Ontario) McMaster Marauders (Coyle)	0	2	0	1	0	1	1	1	1	1	0	8
Alberta Pandas (Rocque)	3	0	3	0	2	0	0	0	0	0	1	9

Sheet 7	1	2	3	4	5	6	7	8	9	10	Final
Manitoba Bisons (Meakin)	0	0	3	1	2	0	0	2	0	X	8
(Ontario) Guelph Gryphons (Gardner)	1	1	0	0	0	1	1	0	1	X	5

==== Draw 2 ====
Wednesday, March 24, 3:00 pm

Sheet 1	1	2	3	4	5	6	7	8	9	10	Final
(Prince Edward Island) UPEI Panthers (Smith)	0	0	1	0	1	0	1	0	X	X	3
Alberta Pandas (Rocque)	2	2	0	3	0	2	0	1	X	X	10

Sheet 3	1	2	3	4	5	6	7	8	9	10	Final
Western Ontario Mustangs (Romain)	0	0	0	2	0	0	2	0	X	X	4
(Ontario) Guelph Gryphons (Gardner)	1	1	2	0	1	2	0	2	X	X	9

Sheet 6	1	2	3	4	5	6	7	8	9	10	Final
Manitoba Bisons (Meakin)	1	0	1	1	2	0	2	0	0	X	7
(Nova Scotia) Saint Mary's Huskies (Spafford)	0	2	0	0	0	1	0	1	1	X	5

Sheet 8	1	2	3	4	5	6	7	8	9	10	Final
(Ontario) McMaster Marauders (Coyle)	1	0	0	0	0	1	1	3	X	X	6
(British Columbia) Thompson Rivers WolfPack (Krausher)	0	1	0	0	0	0	0	0	X	X	1

==== Draw 3 ====
Thursday, March 25, 2:00 pm

Sheet 2	1	2	3	4	5	6	7	8	9	10	Final
Manitoba Bisons (Meakin)	0	0	4	0	1	1	0	3	0	1	10
(Ontario) McMaster Marauders (Coyle)	0	3	0	1	0	0	2	0	2	0	8

Sheet 3	1	2	3	4	5	6	7	8	9	10	Final
(Nova Scotia) Saint Mary's Huskies (Spafford)	0	1	0	1	0	1	0	2	0	X	5
Alberta Pandas (Rocque)	0	0	1	0	3	0	2	0	2	X	8

Sheet 5	1	2	3	4	5	6	7	8	9	10	Final
(Ontario) Guelph Gryphons (Gardner)	0	0	1	0	0	1	1	1	0	X	4
(British Columbia) Thompson Rivers WolfPack (Krausher)	1	1	0	3	1	0	0	0	2	X	8

Sheet 7	1	2	3	4	5	6	7	8	9	10	Final
Western Ontario Mustangs (Romain)	0	1	0	0	2	0	2	1	0	X	6
(Prince Edward Island) UPEI Panthers (Smith)	1	0	4	3	0	2	0	0	1	X	11

==== Draw 4 ====
Thursday, March 25, 7:00 pm

Sheet 2	1	2	3	4	5	6	7	8	9	10	11	Final
Alberta Pandas (Rocque)	1	0	0	0	0	0	1	1	0	0	1	4
(British Columbia) Thompson Rivers WolfPack (Krausher)	0	0	0	1	0	1	0	0	0	1	0	3

Sheet 5	1	2	3	4	5	6	7	8	9	10	Final
Manitoba Bisons (Meakin)	2	0	2	0	3	0	2	0	X	X	9
Western Ontario Mustangs (Romain)	0	1	0	1	0	1	0	2	X	X	5

Sheet 6	1	2	3	4	5	6	7	8	9	10	Final
(Prince Edward Island) UPEI Panthers (Smith)	1	0	0	0	1	1	1	0	1	1	6
(Ontario) McMaster Marauders (Coyle)	0	3	2	1	0	0	0	1	0	0	7

Sheet 8	1	2	3	4	5	6	7	8	9	10	Final
(Ontario) Guelph Gryphons (Gardner)	0	1	0	1	2	0	0	0	1	X	5
(Nova Scotia) Saint Mary's Huskies (Spafford)	1	0	1	0	0	2	0	2	0	X	6

==== Draw 5 ====
Friday, March 26, 9:00 am

Sheet 1	1	2	3	4	5	6	7	8	9	10	Final
(Ontario) McMaster Marauders (Coyle)	0	1	0	2	0	0	4	2	X	X	9
Western Ontario Mustangs (Romain)	0	0	1	0	1	1	0	0	X	X	3

Sheet 4	1	2	3	4	5	6	7	8	9	10	Final
(British Columbia) Thompson Rivers WolfPack (Krausher)	0	0	2	0	0	1	0	1	0	X	4
(Nova Scotia) Saint Mary's Huskies (Spafford)	1	2	0	1	1	0	1	0	1	X	7

Sheet 6	1	2	3	4	5	6	7	8	9	10	11	Final
Alberta Pandas (Rocque)	0	1	0	1	0	5	0	1	0	0	1	9
(Ontario) Guelph Gryphons (Gardner)	0	0	1	0	2	0	2	0	1	2	0	8

Sheet 8	1	2	3	4	5	6	7	8	9	10	Final
(Prince Edward Island) UPEI Panthers (Smith)	0	0	0	0	1	0	1	0	X	X	2
Manitoba Bisons (Meakin)	0	1	1	2	0	3	0	1	X	X	8

==== Draw 6 ====
Friday, March 26, 2:00 pm

Sheet 1	1	2	3	4	5	6	7	8	9	10	Final
(British Columbia) Thompson Rivers WolfPack (Krausher)	0	0	1	0	1	0	0	0	X	X	2
Manitoba Bisons (Meakin)	0	2	0	1	0	1	4	2	X	X	10

Sheet 4	1	2	3	4	5	6	7	8	9	10	Final
(Ontario) Guelph Gryphons (Gardner)	3	0	3	0	2	1	0	0	0	X	9
(Ontario) McMaster Marauders (Coyle)	0	1	0	2	0	0	2	1	0	X	6

Sheet 5	1	2	3	4	5	6	7	8	9	10	11	Final
(Nova Scotia) Saint Mary's Huskies (Spafford)	2	0	0	0	0	3	0	0	2	0	1	8
(Prince Edward Island) UPEI Panthers (Smith)	0	0	0	2	0	0	1	2	0	2	0	7

Sheet 8	1	2	3	4	5	6	7	8	9	10	Final
Alberta Pandas (Rocque)	0	0	0	2	0	0	1	4	0	1	8
Western Ontario Mustangs (Romain)	0	2	1	0	1	1	0	0	2	0	7

==== Draw 7 ====
Saturday, March 27, 9:00 am

Sheet 2	1	2	3	4	5	6	7	8	9	10	Final
(Ontario) Guelph Gryphons (Gardner)	0	2	0	1	0	1	X	X	X	X	4
(Prince Edward Island) UPEI Panthers (Smith)	2	0	4	0	6	0	X	X	X	X	12

Sheet 4	1	2	3	4	5	6	7	8	9	10	Final
Alberta Pandas (Rocque)	0	1	0	1	0	0	0	0	1	0	3
Manitoba Bisons (Meakin)	0	0	2	0	0	0	0	1	0	1	4

Sheet 6	1	2	3	4	5	6	7	8	9	10	Final
(British Columbia) Thompson Rivers WolfPack (Krausher)	2	0	0	0	2	0	1	0	1	0	6
Western Ontario Mustangs (Romain)	0	2	0	1	0	1	0	2	0	1	7

Sheet 7	1	2	3	4	5	6	7	8	9	10	Final
(Nova Scotia) Saint Mary's Huskies (Spafford)	1	0	1	0	2	0	3	0	0	1	6
(Ontario) McMaster Marauders (Coyle)	0	1	0	3	0	2	0	1	0	0	7

=== Playoffs ===
Semifinal			Final
			1	Manitoba Bisons	9
2	Alberta Pandas	8	2	Alberta Pandas	7
3	(Nova Scotia) Saint Mary's Huskies	2

==== Semifinal ====
Saturday, March 23, 7:00 pm

Sheet 6	1	2	3	4	5	6	7	8	9	10	Final
Alberta Pandas (Rocque)	0	2	1	0	1	1	0	0	3	X	8
(Nova Scotia) Saint Mary's Huskies (Spafford)	0	0	0	1	0	0	0	1	0	X	2

==== Final ====
Sunday, March 24, 2:00 pm

Sheet 3	1	2	3	4	5	6	7	8	9	10	Final
Manitoba Bisons (Meakin)	2	1	0	2	0	0	0	0	2	2	9
Alberta Pandas (Rocque)	0	0	4	0	1	1	0	1	0	0	7

== Awards and honours ==
The all-star teams and award winners are as follows:

=== All-Canadian teams ===
Men

First Team

- Skip: (Ontario) Jake Walker, University of Waterloo
- Third: (Ontario) Edward Cyr, University of Waterloo
- Second: Ian McMillan, University of Manitoba
- Lead: (Nova Scotia) Ben Creaser, Acadia University

Second Team

- Skip: Brendan Bottcher, University of Alberta
- Third: Mick Lizmore, University of Alberta
- Second: Brad Thiessen, University of Alberta
- Lead: (Ontario) James Freeman, University of Waterloo

Women

First Team

- Skip: Kelsey Rocque, University of Alberta
- Third: Keely Brown, University of Alberta
- Second: Erica Ortt, University of Alberta
- Lead: Krysten Karwacki, University of Manitoba

Second Team

- Skip: Breanne Meakin, University of Manitoba
- Third: Ashley Howard, University of Manitoba
- Second: Selena Kaatz, University of Manitoba
- Lead: Stephanie Thompson, University of Western Ontario

=== CIS Coaching awards ===
Men

- (Nova Scotia) Alan Mayhew, Acadia University

Women

- Rory Munro, University of Western Ontario

=== Sportsmanship awards ===
Men

- (Nova Scotia) Alex Trites, Acadia University second

Women

- Jackie Rivington, University of Western Ontario third
