= Megan Balsdon =

Canadian curler

- Curler
- Born: May 10, 1982 (age 44); Toronto, Ontario

Team
- Skip: Megan Balsdon
- Fourth: Hollie Duncan
- Second: Rachelle Strybosch
- Lead: Tess Guyatt

Curling career
- Member Association: Ontario
- Hearts: 1 (2022)
- Top CTRS ranking: 9th (2021–22)
Medal record
Women's curling
Representing Canada
Winter Universiade
Silver medal – second place	2009 Harbin

Megan Balsdon (born May 10, 1982 in Toronto, Ontario) is a Canadian curler. She is currently the skip of Team Hollie Duncan.

== Career ==
In 1998, Balsdon won the Ontario Bantam Mixed championships playing third for skip Bobby Reid. In 2001, she won the Pepsi Ontario Junior Curling Championships playing third for Carrie Lindner. The team represented Ontario at the 2001 Canadian Junior Curling Championships, finishing with an 8-4 round robin record. The team would place third after losing to Prince Edward Island's Suzanne Gaudet in the semifinal game.

After juniors, Balsdon joined the Kelly Cochrane rink, playing third for Cochrane until 2006. Balsdon then re-united with Lindner as her third, winning the 2006 Shorty Jenkins Classic, their first World Curling Tour event together. The team would play in two Grand Slam events, the 2007 Wayden Transportation Ladies Classic and the 2008 Sobeys Slam. Balsdon and Lindner added Julie Reddick as their skip in 2011, with Balsdon throwing second stones. The team won the 2012 Challenge Chateau Cartier de Gatineau. Balsdon remained as a member of the Reddick rink until forming her own team in 2014. Balsdon would make it to her first Ontario Scotties Tournament of Hearts as a skip in 2015. At the 2015 Ontario Scotties Tournament of Hearts, she and her rink of Jessica Corrado, Stephanie Corrado and Laura Hickey finished in last place, with a 2-7 record. Balsdon returned to the Ontario Scotties in 2017 with this team, finishing with a worse record of 1-6.

Balsdon joined the Julie Tippin rink as her third in 2018. The team played in the 2019 Ontario Scotties Tournament of Hearts, losing in the final to Rachel Homan. Tippin left the team after the season, and Balsdon took over as skip, adding Lynn Kreviazuk at third to join the front end players of Rachelle Strybosch and Tess Bobbie. The team had a successful season on tour, reaching the final of the KW Fall Classic, the semifinal of the Tim Hortons Spitfire Arms Cash Spiel and the quarterfinals of the 2019 Cameron's Brewing Oakville Fall Classic, Stu Sells Oakville Tankard and the 2019 Tour Challenge Tier 2 Grand Slam of Curling event. At the 2020 Ontario Scotties Tournament of Hearts, the team finished with a 3–5 record. With Kreviazuk leaving the team following the season, Balsdon, Strybosch and Bobbie added Hollie Duncan to their team as their new skip. The team only played in one event during the 2020–21 season due to the COVID-19 pandemic. They reached the final of the Stu Sells Oakville Tankard, losing to Team Jennifer Jones in an extra end.

The newly formed team began the 2021–22 season with a semifinal finish at the 2021 Oakville Labour Day Classic where they lost to event winners Team Tracy Fleury. In their next event, the team won the Stu Sells Oakville Tankard, defeating the Kerry Galusha rink in the final. The following week, they lost in the final of the KW Fall Classic to Team Galusha. They responded with their second event title of the season at the Stu Sells Toronto Tankard where they defeated Team Shannon Jay in the final. Because of their successes on tour, Team Duncan had enough points to qualify for the 2021 Canadian Olympic Curling Pre-Trials. At the Pre-Trials, the team finished with a 3–3 record, failing to qualify for the championship round. Team Duncan played in two more tour events during the season, missing the playoffs of the 2021 National Grand Slam of Curling event and reaching the quarterfinals of the DeKalb Superspiel. Due to the cancellation of the Ontario Scotties Tournament of Hearts, CurlON appointed Team Rachel Homan to represent the province at the 2022 Scotties Tournament of Hearts. However, because Homan herself was chosen to represent Canada at the 2022 Winter Olympics in mixed doubles, Team Duncan were awarded the spot as Team Ontario at the national championship, with Team Homan earning one of the three Wild Card spots. At the Hearts, Team Duncan started with four straight losses before winning their last four games, finishing the event with a 4–4 record.

== Personal life ==
Balsdon works as a research associate with SoleScience Inc., and is a PhD candidate at the University of Western Ontario. She attended York Mills Collegiate Institute and the University of Guelph. She is the sister of 2014 Ontario Tankard champion Greg Balsdon. She is engaged and has two children.
