= Jake Walker (curler) =

Canadian curler

- Curler
- Born: March 14, 1989 (age 37)

Team
- Curling club: Annandale CC, Ajax, ON

Curling career
- Member Association: Ontario
Medal record
Men's Curling
Representing Canada
World Junior Curling Championships
Bronze medal – third place	2010 Flims

Jake Walker (born March 14, 1989) is a Canadian curler originally from Minden, Ontario. He is a former Canadian Junior champion, and world junior bronze medallist.

As a Bantam-aged curler, Walker won the Ontario Bantam championship in 2005, playing third for Ben Willemse. In 2010, Walker and his rink of Craig Van Ymeren, Geoff Chambers and Matthew Mapletoft won the Pepsi Ontario Junior Curling Championships. The team would represent the province at the 2010 Canadian Junior Curling Championships in Sorel-Tracy, Quebec. Walker would lead the rink to a 9-3 round robin record, followed by winning the semi-final against Saskatchewan's Braeden Moskowy and the final against Manitoba's Alex Forrest. This earned the four-some a berth at the 2010 World Junior Curling Championships in Flims, Switzerland, representing Canada. The team sneaked into the playoffs after a 6-3 round robin record left them in a tie with Norway's Steffen Mellemseter. They beat Norway, but lost to Switzerland's Peter de Cruz in the 3 vs. 4 game. This put the team into the bronze medal game, which they won, against China's Ji Yansong.

After his junior career, Walker focused on University Curling and his University of Waterloo team. Walker skipped Waterloo to 2nd place at the 2012 CIS/CCA Curling Championships, losing to the University of Alberta's Brendan Bottcher in the final. Walker would avenge this loss at the 2013 CIS/CCA Curling Championships, where he beat Bottcher to win the championship.

In 2013, Walker began curling on the World Curling Tour, assembling a team with himself at skip, Dayna Deruelle at third, Andrew McGaugh at second and Mike McGaugh at lead. Walker made the provincial championships in their first season together, Walker's first Travelers Tankard appearance.
