= Rachelle Strybosch =

Canadian curler

- Curler
- Born: Rachelle Vink; July 1, 1991 (age 35); Woodstock, Ontario

Team
- Curling club: Woodstock CC, Woodstock, ON
- Skip: Megan Balsdon
- Fourth: Hollie Duncan
- Second: Rachelle Strybosch
- Lead: Tess Guyatt

Curling career
- Member Association: Ontario
- Hearts: 1 (2022)
- Top CTRS ranking: 9th (2021–22)

Rachelle Strybosch (born July 1, 1991 in Woodstock, Ontario as Rachelle Vink) is a Canadian curler. She currently plays second on Team Hollie Duncan, which is skipped by Megan Balsdon.

== Career ==
=== Youth ===
Strybosch played third for the McMaster Marauders University curling team at the 2013 CIS/CCA Curling Championships. The team, skipped by Ginger Coyle finished with a 3-4 record, missing the playoffs.

Strybosch played third for Fanshawe College at the 2015 CCAA Curling National Championships, on a team skipped by Shannon Kee. The team would go on to win the gold medal at the event.

=== Women's ===
After her college career, Strybosch joined the Tippin rink in 2015. In their first season together, the team won the CookstownCash presented by Comco Canada Inc. and the Stroud Sleeman Cash Spiel. Strybosch qualified for her first Ontario Scotties Tournament of Hearts in 2016 as a part of the team. The team made the playoffs, but lost in the 3 vs. 4 page playoff game.

In the 2016–17 season, the team defended their title at the Stroud Sleeman Cash Spiel. They played at the 2017 Ontario Scotties Tournament of Hearts, but missed the playoffs.

In the 2017–18 season, Strybosch qualified for her first Grand Slam event, the 2017 GSOC Tour Challenge, where the team would lose in a tiebreaker. The team won two events in the season, the StuSells Toronto Tankard and the KW Fall Classic. The Tippin rink would win the B final of the 2017 Home Hardware Road to the Road Pre-Trials, qualifying the team to play at the 2017 Canadian Olympic Curling Trials where they would finish in eighth place with a 2–6 record. They would not qualify for the playoffs at the 2018 Ontario Scotties Tournament of Hearts.

The following season, Team Tippin qualified for the 2019 Ontario Scotties Tournament of Hearts where they lost in the final to Rachel Homan. Tippin left the team after the season, and Megan Balsdon took over as skip, adding Lynn Kreviazuk at third. The team had a successful season on tour, reaching the final of the KW Fall Classic, the semifinal of the Tim Hortons Spitfire Arms Cash Spiel and the quarterfinals of the 2019 Cameron's Brewing Oakville Fall Classic, Stu Sells Oakville Tankard and the 2019 Tour Challenge Tier 2 Grand Slam of Curling event. At the 2020 Ontario Scotties Tournament of Hearts, the team finished with a 3–5 record. With Kreviazuk leaving the team following the season, Balsdon, Strybosch and Bobbie added Hollie Duncan to their team as their new skip. The team only played in one event during the 2020–21 season due to the COVID-19 pandemic. They reached the final of the Stu Sells Oakville Tankard, losing to Team Jennifer Jones in an extra end.

The newly formed team began the 2021–22 season with a semifinal finish at the 2021 Oakville Labour Day Classic where they lost to event winners Team Tracy Fleury. In their next event, the team won the Stu Sells Oakville Tankard, defeating the Kerry Galusha rink in the final. The following week, they lost in the final of the KW Fall Classic to Team Galusha. They responded with their second event title of the season at the Stu Sells Toronto Tankard where they defeated Team Shannon Jay in the final. Because of their successes on tour, Team Duncan had enough points to qualify for the 2021 Canadian Olympic Curling Pre-Trials. At the Pre-Trials, the team finished with a 3–3 record, failing to qualify for the championship round. Team Duncan played in two more tour events during the season, missing the playoffs of the 2021 National Grand Slam of Curling event and reaching the quarterfinals of the DeKalb Superspiel. Due to the cancellation of the Ontario Scotties Tournament of Hearts, CurlON appointed Team Rachel Homan to represent the province at the 2022 Scotties Tournament of Hearts. However, because Homan herself was chosen to represent Canada at the 2022 Winter Olympics in mixed doubles, Team Duncan were awarded the spot as Team Ontario at the national championship, with Team Homan earning one of the three Wild Card spots. At the Hearts, Team Duncan started with four straight losses before winning their last four games, finishing the event with a 4–4 record.

=== Mixed doubles ===
Strybosch and partner Travis Fanset played in the 2014 Canadian Mixed Doubles Curling Trials. After posting a 5-2 group record, they lost in the round of 12 to Dustin Kalthoff and Nancy Martin.

== Personal life ==
Strybosch is the general manager at the Woodstock Meadows Golf Centre. She is married to Jordan Strybosch and has one child. She attended St. Mary's Catholic High School.
