= Allison Flaxey =

Canadian curler

- Curler
- Born: Allison Nimik; February 13, 1985 (age 41); Winnipeg, Manitoba

Team
- Curling club: High Park Club, Toronto
- Skip: Carly Howard
- Third: Allison Flaxey
- Second: Lynn Kreviazuk
- Lead: Laura Hickey

Curling career
- Member Association: Manitoba (2001-2008; 2018-19); Alberta (2008-2011); Ontario (2011-2018; 2019-present)
- Hearts: 2 (2014, 2022)
- World Mixed Doubles Championship: 1 (2009)
- Top CTRS ranking: 3rd (2016–17)
- Grand Slam victories: 1 (2016 Masters)
Medal record
Curling
Representing Canada
World Mixed Doubles Curling Championship
Bronze medal – third place	2009 Cortina d'Ampezzo

Allison "Alli" Flaxey (née Nimik; born February 13, 1985) is a Canadian curler from Caledon, Ontario. She currently plays third on Team Carly Howard. She is a former Canadian Mixed champion, and World Mixed Doubles bronze medallist.

== Career ==
Flaxey is originally from Winnipeg, Manitoba. As a junior, she won the Manitoba Junior championships at the age of 15 in 2001 with teammates Kristin Loder, Lindsay Titheridge and Elisabeth Peters. The team finished with a 4–8 record at the 2001 Canadian Junior Curling Championships.

Flaxey began curling competitively playing second for Shauna Streich. As a resident of Manitoba, she won the 2009 Canadian Mixed Curling Championship (held in Autumn 2008), playing third for Sean Grassie. This qualified the two for the 2009 World Mixed Doubles Curling Championship, where they won a bronze medal. In 2008, Flaxey moved to Alberta where she played competitively as third for Leslie Rogers in 2009 and 2010 and then as third for Casey Scheidegger in 2011. She made the Alberta Scotties Tournament of Hearts in all three of those seasons. Her highest finish was 4th in 2010.

In 2011, Flaxey moved to Ontario to form her own team. As skip, she qualified for her first Ontario Scotties Tournament of Hearts in 2012 where she finished with a 2–7 record. The following year, her team did not qualify for the Ontario Hearts, but won the event in 2014, qualifying Flaxey and her team of Katie Cottrill, Lynn Kreviazuk and Morgan Court to represent Ontario at the 2014 Scotties Tournament of Hearts. There, Flaxey led Ontario to a 3–8 record. As defending champions, Flaxey qualified for the 2015 Ontario Scotties Tournament of Hearts, but failed to make the playoffs after posting a 4–5 record.

For the 2015-16 curling season, Flaxey formed a new team with Clancy Grandy, Lynn Kreviazuk and Morgan Court. The tean qualified for the 2016 Ontario Scotties Tournament of Hearts, but finished with a 3–6 record. However, they did win a World Curling Tour event that season, winning the KW Fall Classic. The next season, Flaxey won her first Grand Slam of Curling event, the 2016 WFG Masters. The team had enough points to qualify for the 2017 Ontario Scotties Tournament of Hearts through the CTRS Leaders, but they lost the tiebreaker to Cathy Auld 10–4. The team lost all three qualifiers at the 2018 Ontario Scotties Tournament of Hearts and did not qualify for the playoffs.

After the 2017-18 season, Flaxey announced she would be moving back to Manitoba to skip the team a new team of Kate Cameron, Taylor McDonald and Raunora Westcott for the 2018-19 season. The team played in one Slam, the 2018 Tour Challenge, where they finished 1-3 missing the playoffs. At the 2019 Manitoba Scotties Tournament of Hearts, the team failed to qualify for the playoffs after posting a 4-3 round robin record.

Flaxey moved back to Ontario for the 2019-20 season to join former teammates Clancy Grandy and Morgan Lavell. Flaxey moved down to third as the team brought on Kaitlyn Jones to play skip. The team did not have a great season, failing to win any tour events and not qualifying for the provincial championship. The team disbanded after just one season. On March 26, 2020, it was announced that Flaxey would play third for Jacqueline Harrison for the 2020–21 season with Lynn Kreviazuk at second and Laura Hickey at lead.

The new team's first major event was the 2021 Canadian Olympic Curling Trials, where they went 3–5, which included defeating the defending champion Rachel Homan rink. With Homan playing at the 2022 Winter Olympics as a member of Canada's mixed doubles team, Flaxey was invited to play second on the Homan rink at the 2022 Scotties Tournament of Hearts, which qualified as Wild Card #3. The team, skipped by Emma Miskew finished with a 4–4 record.

With Harrison out with a hip injury, Flaxey led the Harrison rink to qualify for the 2023 Ontario Scotties Tournament of Hearts.

== Personal life ==
Flaxey and fellow curler Caleb Flaxey were married in March 2013. She works as a Sales Division Manager for Canada Malting.

== Grand Slam record ==
Key
C	Champion
F	Lost in Final
SF	Lost in Semifinal
QF	Lost in Quarterfinals
R16	Lost in the round of 16
Q	Did not advance to playoffs
T2	Played in Tier 2 event
DNP	Did not participate in event
N/A	Not a Grand Slam event that season

Event	2007–08	2008–09	2009–10	2010–11	2011–12	2012–13	2013–14	2014–15	2015–16	2016–17	2017–18	2018–19
Masters	N/A	N/A	N/A	N/A	N/A	Q	DNP	Q	DNP	C	Q	DNP
Tour Challenge	N/A	N/A	N/A	N/A	N/A	N/A	N/A	N/A	DNP	SF	Q	Q
The National	N/A	N/A	N/A	N/A	N/A	N/A	N/A	N/A	DNP	Q	Q	DNP
Canadian Open	N/A	N/A	N/A	N/A	N/A	N/A	N/A	Q	DNP	QF	QF	DNP
Players'	DNP	DNP	DNP	DNP	DNP	DNP	DNP	DNP	DNP	Q	DNP	DNP
Champions Cup	N/A	N/A	N/A	N/A	N/A	N/A	N/A	N/A	Q	Q	DNP	DNP

=== Former events ===
Event	2006–07	2007–08	2008–09	2009–10	2010–11	2011–12	2012–13	2013–14	2014–15
Autumn Gold	DNP	Q	DNP	DNP	Q	DNP	DNP	DNP	DNP
Manitoba Liquor & Lotteries	Q	Q	DNP	DNP	DNP	DNP	DNP	DNP	N/A
Colonial Square	N/A	N/A	N/A	N/A	N/A	N/A	DNP	SF	Q
