= Chantal Duhaime =

Canadian curler

Chantal Duhaime (born March 6, 1990, in Pickering, Ontario, as Chantal Lalonde) is a Canadian curler from Barrie, Ontario. She currently plays third for Team Jacqueline Harrison.

== Curling career ==
Duhaime played third for Ontario at the 2008 Canadian Junior Curling Championships on a team skipped by Danielle Inglis. The team finished the round robin with a 6–6 record, missing the playoffs. She skipped the Fanshawe College Falcons at the 2012 CCAA Curling Invitational Championship, winning the gold medal.

Duhaime and future husband Connor Duhaime played in the 2014 Canadian Mixed Doubles Curling Trials, but finished with a 1–6 record, missing the playoffs.

After her college career, Duhaime continued to skip her own team on the Ontario and World Curling Tours. She joined the Tippin rink in 2015. In their first season together, the team won the CookstownCash presented by Comco Canada Inc. and the Stroud Sleeman Cash Spiel. Duhaime qualified for her first Ontario Scotties Tournament of Hearts in 2016 as part of the team. The team made the playoffs, but lost in the 3 vs. 4 game.

In the 2016-17 curling season, the team defended their title at the Stroud Sleeman Cash Spiel. They played at the 2017 Ontario Scotties Tournament of Hearts, but missed the playoffs.

In the 2017-18 curling season, Duhaime qualified for her first Grand Slam event, the 2017 GSOC Tour Challenge, where the team would lose in a tiebreaker. The team won two events in the season, the StuSells Toronto Tankard and the KW Fall Classic. The Tippin rink would win the B final of the 2017 Home Hardware Road to the Road Pre-Trials, qualifying the team to play at the 2017 Canadian Olympic Curling Trials.

== Personal life ==
Duhaime owns River Rock Dental Hygiene. She is married to fellow curler Connor Duhaime. She graduated from Fanshawe College in 2012.
