= Lynn Kreviazuk =

Canadian curler

- Curler
- Born: Lynn Elizabeth Kreviazuk; May 2, 1991 (age 35); Ottawa, Ontario, Canada

Team
- Curling club: Ottawa Curling Club, Ottawa, ON
- Skip: Carly Howard
- Third: Katelyn Wasylkiw
- Second: Lynn Kreviazuk
- Lead: Laura Hickey
- Mixed doubles partner: David Mathers

Curling career
- Member Association: Ontario
- Hearts: 2 (2014, 2022)
- Top CTRS ranking: 3rd (2016–17)
- Grand Slam victories: 1 (2016 Masters)
Medal record
Women's curling
Representing Canada
World Junior Curling Championships
Silver medal – second place	2010 Flims
Winter Universiade
Silver medal – second place	2015 Granada
Representing Ontario
Canadian Mixed Doubles Trials
Bronze medal – third place	2015 Ottawa
Canada Winter Games
Gold medal – first place	2007 Whitehorse

Lynn Elizabeth Kreviazuk (born May 2, 1991) is a Canadian curler from Ottawa, Ontario. She currently plays second on Team Carly Howard.

== Career ==
Kreviazuk was the longtime lead for the Rachel Homan rink. She first joined the team in 2005 as its second. In 2006, the team won the Ontario Bantam Championship, followed by a gold medal at the Canada Winter Games the following season.

In 2008, she became only the second female to skip a team to the Ontario Bantam Mixed Championship.

Both in 2009 and 2010 as a member of the Homan rink, she won the provincial junior championships. She won again in 2011 as a member of the Clancy Grandy rink. In 2010, she won the Canadian Junior Curling Championships and a silver medal at the 2010 World Junior Curling Championships.

She coached the Nunavut women's team at the 2013 and 2014 Canadian Junior Curling Championships.

== Personal life ==
Kreviazuk works as an executive assistant at the House of Commons of Canada. She is married to fellow curler David Mathers.

Her sisters are Alison Kreviazuk, who played second for the Homan rink, and Cheryl Kreviazuk, who played as alternate for the Homan rink in 2014-2015 and 2016–2017. Her second cousin is the singer Chantal Kreviazuk.

== Teams ==
Season	Skip	Third	Second	Lead
2005–06	Rachel Homan	Emma Miskew	Lynn Kreviazuk	Jamie Sinclair
2006–07	Rachel Homan	Emma Miskew	Lynn Kreviazuk	Jamie Sinclair
2007–08	Rachel Homan	Emma Miskew	Alison Kreviazuk	Lynn Kreviazuk
2008–09	Rachel Homan	Emma Miskew	Alison Kreviazuk	Lynn Kreviazuk
2008–09	Rachel Homan	Emma Miskew	Alison Kreviazuk	Lynn Kreviazuk
2009–10	Rachel Homan	Emma Miskew	Alison Kreviazuk	Lynn Kreviazuk
2010–11	Clancy Grandy	Sarah Wilkes	Laura Crocker	Lynn Kreviazuk
2012–13	Allison Flaxey	Katie Cottrill	Lynn Kreviazvuk	Morgan Court
2013–14	Allison Flaxey	Katie Cottrill	Lynn Kreviazvuk	Morgan Court
2014–15	Breanne Meakin	Lauren Horton	Lynn Kreviazuk	Jessica Armstrong
2015–16	Allison Flaxey	Clancy Grandy	Lynn Kreviazvuk	Morgan Court
2016–17	Allison Flaxey	Clancy Grandy	Lynn Kreviazvuk	Morgan Court
2017–18	Allison Flaxey	Clancy Grandy	Lynn Kreviazvuk	Morgan Court
2018–19	Jacqueline Harrison	Clancy Grandy	Lynn Kreviazvuk	Morgan Court
2019–20	Megan Balsdon	Lynn Kreviazuk	Rachelle Strybosch	Tess Bobbie
2020–21	Jacqueline Harrison	Allison Flaxey	Lynn Kreviazuk	Laura Hickey
2021–22	Jacqueline Harrison	Allison Flaxey	Lynn Kreviazuk	Laura Hickey
2022–23	Jacqueline Harrison	Allison Flaxey	Lynn Kreviazuk	Laura Hickey
2023–24	Carly Howard	Allison Flaxey	Lynn Kreviazuk	Laura Hickey
2024–25	Carly Howard	Katelyn Wasylkiw	Lynn Kreviazuk	Laura Hickey
