= Cheryl Kreviazuk =

Canadian curler

- Curler
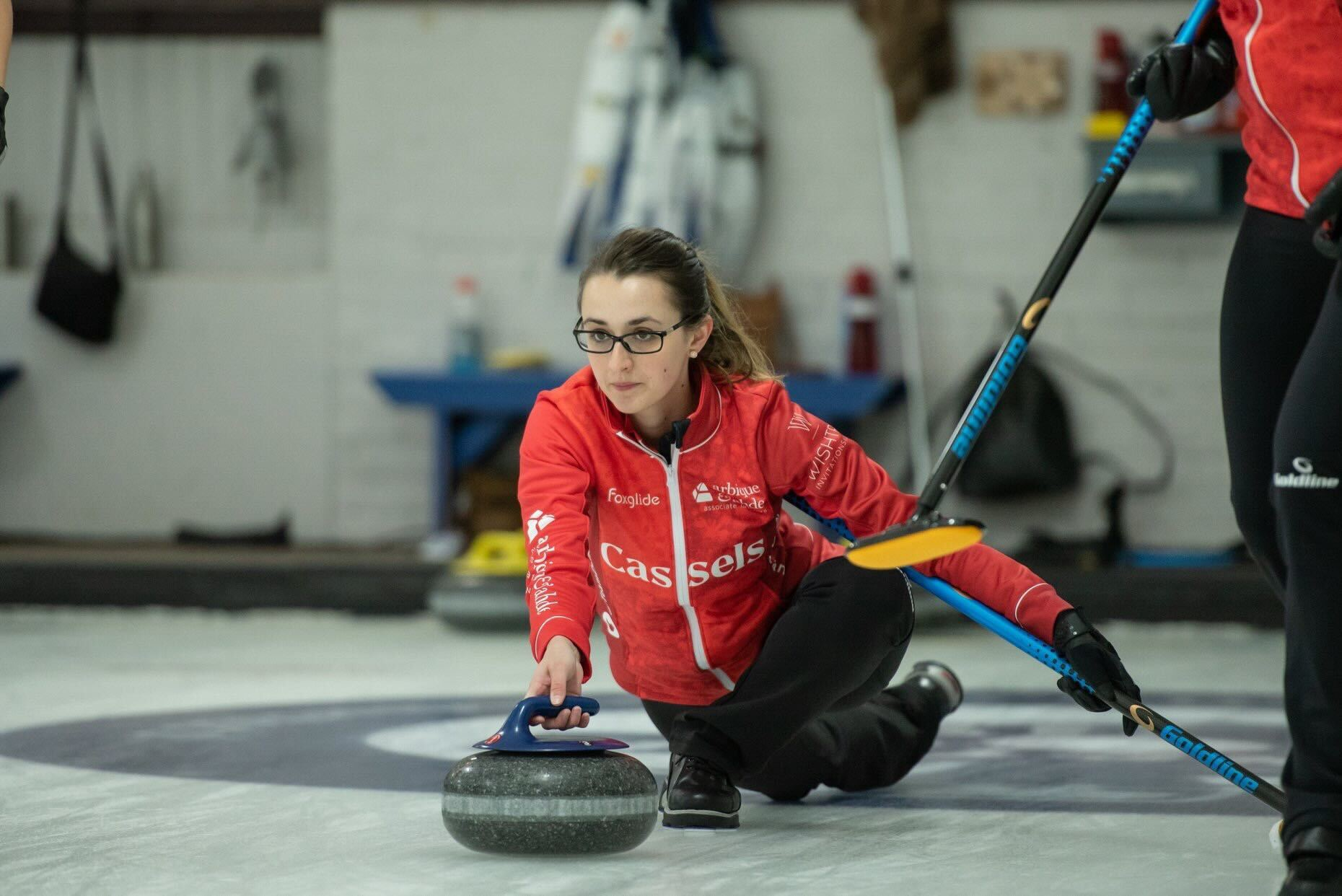
- Born: September 25, 1992 (age 34); Ottawa, Ontario, Canada

Team
- Curling club: Ottawa CC, Ottawa, ON

Curling career
- Member Association: Ontario
- Hearts: 5 (2015, 2017, 2018, 2019, 2020)
- Top CTRS ranking: 11th (2022–23)
Medal record
Women's Curling
Representing Canada
World Curling Championships
Gold medal – first place	2017 Beijing
Representing Ontario
Canadian Olympic Curling Trials
Gold medal – first place	2017 Ottawa
Scotties Tournament of Hearts
Gold medal – first place	2017 St Catharines
Silver medal – second place	2019 Sydney
Silver medal – second place	2020 Moose Jaw
Bronze medal – third place	2015 Moose Jaw

Cheryl Kreviazuk (born September 25, 1992) is a Canadian curler from Ottawa, Ontario.

She is better known as the alternate for the Rachel Homan rink in 2015, when the team won bronze at the 2015 Scotties Tournament of Hearts, and in 2017, when they won gold at the 2017 Scotties Tournament of Hearts and the 2017 World Women's Curling Championship.

== Personal life ==
Her sisters are well known curlers: Alison Kreviazuk, who played second for the Homan rink, and Lynn Kreviazuk, current second for Team Carly Howard. Kreviazuk attended Wilfrid Laurier University and Sir Robert Borden High School. Kreviazuk currently works as a clinical research coordinator at the Children's Hospital of Eastern Ontario Research Institute.

Her (and Alison and Lynn's) father is Doug Kreviazuk. He is a former board member with the Ontario Curling Association and a curling coach (he also coached Team Canada at the 2015 Winter Universiade, in which Lynn played).

Her second cousin is the singer Chantal Kreviazuk.

== Teams ==
Season	Skip	Third	Second	Lead	Alternate	Events	Coach
2009–10	Jamie Sinclair	Cheryl Kreviazuk	Melissa Gannon	Rebecca Wichers-Schreur			
2012–13	Caitlin Romain	Carly Howard	Kerilynn Mathers	Cheryl Kreviazuk			
2013–14	Carly Howard	Kerilynn Mathers	Evangeline Fortier	Cheryl Kreviazuk	Chelsea Brandwood		
2013	Laura Crocker	Sarah Wilkes	Jennifer Gates	Cheryl Kreviazuk	Breanne Meakin	WUG (6th)	Garry Coderre
2014–15	Caitlin Romain	Kendall Haymes	Kerilynn Mathers	Cheryl Kreviazuk			
2015	Rachel Homan	Emma Miskew	Joanne Courtney	Lisa Weagle	Cheryl Kreviazuk	STOH (bronze)	Richard Hart
2015–16	Mallory Kean	Carly Howard	Kerilynn Mathers	Cheryl Kreviazuk			
2016–17	Hollie Nicol	Chantal Allan	Cheryl Kreviazuk	Karen Sagle	Brit O'Neill		
2017	Rachel Homan	Emma Miskew	Joanne Courtney	Lisa Weagle	Cheryl Kreviazuk	STOH (gold) , WWCC (gold) , COCT (gold)	Adam Kingsbury
2017–18	Hollie Duncan	Stephanie LeDrew	Cheryl Kreviazuk	Karen Sagle	Danielle Inglis	STOH	
2018–19	Hollie Duncan	Laura Hickey	Cheryl Kreviazuk	Karen Sagle			
2019	Rachel Homan	Emma Miskew	Joanne Courtney	Lisa Weagle	Cheryl Kreviazuk	STOH (silver)	Marcel Rocque
2019–20	Hollie Duncan	Laura Hickey	Cheryl Kreviazuk	Karen Sagle			
2020	Rachel Homan	Emma Miskew	Joanne Courtney	Lisa Weagle	Cheryl Kreviazuk	STOH (silver)	Marcel Rocque
2020–21	Lauren Mann	Kira Brunton	Cheryl Kreviazuk	Karen Trines			
2021–22	Lauren Mann	Kira Brunton	Cheryl Kreviazuk	Karen Trines	Marcia Richardson		
2022–23	Danielle Inglis	Kira Brunton	Cheryl Kreviazuk	Cassandra de Groot			
