= Rhonda Varnes =

Canadian curler

- Curler
- Born: April 14, 1984 (age 42); Winnipeg, Manitoba

Team
- Curling club: Heather Curling Club
- Skip: Rhonda Varnes
- Third: Grace Beaudry
- Second: Emily Ostrowsky
- Lead: Kylie Lippens
- Alternate: Erika Campbell

Curling career
- Member Association: Manitoba (2000–2008, 2016–2018; 2023–present); Ontario (2008–2016, 2020–2022); Alberta (2018–2020)

Rhonda Varnes (born April 14, 1984 in Winnipeg, Manitoba) is a Canadian curler. She currently skips her own team in Winnipeg.

== Career ==
Varnes grew up in Manitoba, where she won the 2001 Manitoba Juvenile Provincial Championship. As a junior curler, she played in three provincial junior championships as a skip. Her first season on the World Curling Tour was 2005–06. That season, she was the youngest skip at the 2006 Manitoba Scotties Tournament of Hearts where she led her Stonewall Curling Club rink to a 3–4 record. After the season she joined the Linda Stewart rink for one season. The team made it to the 2007 Manitoba Scotties, finishing with a 4–3 record. After one more season as a skip in Manitoba, Varnes moved to Ottawa in 2008.

In 2015, Varnes and her team of Melissa Gannon, Erin Macaulay and Rebecca Wichers-Schreur qualified for their first Ontario Scotties Tournament of Hearts. In 2016, Varnes moved back to her home province of Manitoba where she joined the Briane Meilleur rink at Third.

== Teams ==
Season	Skip	Third	Second	Lead	Alternate
2014–15	Rhonda Varnes	Melissa Gannon	Erin Way	Rebecca Gravelle	
2015–16	Rhonda Varnes	Melissa Gannon	Erin Way	Rebecca Gravelle	Andrea Sinclair
2016–17	Brianne Harris	Rhonda Varnes	Janelle Lach	Sarah Neufeld	
2017–18	Rhonda Varnes	Jenna Loder	Katherine Doerksen	Danielle Robinson	
2018–19	Rhonda Varnes	Holly Scott	Larissa Murray	Claire Murray	
2019–20	Kelly Stiksma	Rhonda Varnes	Ocean Pletz	Bailey Horve	Chantal Allan
2020–21	Emma Wallingford	Rhonda Varnes	Melissa Gannon	Kayla Gray	
2021–22	Emma Wallingford	Rhonda Varnes	Melissa Gannon	Kayla Gray	
2022–23	Rhonda Varnes	Janelle Lach	Hallie McCannell	Jolene Callum	Sarah-Jane Sass
2023–24	Rhonda Varnes	Cheyenne Ehnes	Mikaylah Lyburn	Joanne Tarvit	Dayna Lee
2024–25	Darcy Robertson	Rhonda Varnes	Brooklyn Meiklejohn	Kylie Lippens	Erika Campbell
2025–26	Darcy Robertson	Rhonda Varnes	Brooklyn Meiklejohn	Kylie Lippens	Erika Campbell
2026–27	Rhonda Varnes	Grace Beaudry	Emily Ostrowsky	Kylie Lippens	Erika Campbell
