= Shannon Jay =

Canadian curler

Shannon Emily Jay (born January 20, 1993; née Kee) is a Canadian curler from Sarnia, Ontario. She currently skips a team on the World Curling Tour.

In 2013, Jay was a member of the Fanshawe College team, skipped by Jordan Ariss, that won the CCAA Curling National Championships. In 2014, she and her teammate then-boyfriend Chris Jay won the 2014 Ontario Mixed Doubles Challenge. They played in the 2014 Canadian Mixed Doubles Curling Trials, going 5-2 in their pool before losing in their first playoff game.

In 2015, Jay and her rink of Pam Feldkamp, Margot Flemming, Halyna Tepylo and Kerry Lackie qualified for the 2015 Ontario Scotties Tournament of Hearts, Jay's first women's provincial Scotties appearance. There, she led her team to a 3-6 record.
