= 2019 Tour Challenge =

Grand Slam of Curling event

2019 KIOTI TRACTOR Tour Challenge
- Host city: Westville Road, Nova Scotia
- Arena: Pictou County Wellness Centre
- Dates: November 5–10
- Men's winner: (Ontario) Team Jacobs
- Curling club: Community First CC, Sault Ste. Marie
- Skip: Brad Jacobs
- Third: Marc Kennedy
- Second: E. J. Harnden
- Lead: Ryan Harnden
- Finalist: (Newfoundland and Labrador) Brad Gushue
- Women's winner: (Sweden) Team Hasselborg
- Curling club: Sundbybergs CK, Sundbyberg
- Skip: Anna Hasselborg
- Third: Sara McManus
- Second: Agnes Knochenhauer
- Lead: Sofia Mabergs
- Finalist: (Manitoba) Kerri Einarson

The 2019 KIOTI TRACTOR Tour Challenge was held from November 5 to 10, at the Pictou County Wellness Centre in Westville Road, Nova Scotia. It was the second Grand Slam event of the 2019–20 season.

In the men's tier 1 final, Brad Jacobs of Sault Ste. Marie, Ontario defeated Brad Gushue of St. John's, Newfoundland and Labrador to win his 5th Grand Slam. In the tier 2 final, Korey Dropkin defeated Tanner Horgan to earn a spot at the 2020 Canadian Open in January.

In the women's tier 1 final, Anna Hasselborg of Sundbyberg, Sweden defeated Kerri Einarson of Gimli, Manitoba to win her 3rd Grand Slam. In the tier 2 final, Kim Min-ji defeated Jestyn Murphy to earn a spot at the Canadian Open.

== Qualification ==
The Tour Challenge consists of two tiers. For the Tier 1, the top 15 teams on the World Curling Tour Order of Merit rankings as of October 1, 2019 are invited. In the event that a team declines their invitation, the next-ranked team on the order of merit is invited until the field is complete. For the Tier 2, 16 teams are invited including the next top ranked OOM teams and regional teams.

=== Men ===
==== Tier 1 ====
Top Order of Merit men's teams as of October 1:

1. (Alberta) Kevin Koe
2. (Ontario) John Epping
3. (Alberta) Brendan Bottcher
4. (Sweden) Niklas Edin
5. (Scotland) Bruce Mouat
6. (Ontario) Brad Jacobs
7. (Switzerland) Peter de Cruz
8. (Scotland) ~~Ross Paterson~~
9. (Newfoundland and Labrador) Brad Gushue
10. (Saskatchewan) Matt Dunstone
11. (Switzerland) Yannick Schwaller
12. (Ontario) Glenn Howard
13. (Ontario) Scott McDonald
14. (United States) John Shuster
15. (Manitoba) Mike McEwen
16. (Manitoba) Jason Gunnlaugson

==== Tier 2 ====
Order of Merit teams:

- (Scotland) Cameron Bryce
- (Manitoba) Braden Calvert
- (United States) Korey Dropkin
- (Quebec) Mike Fournier
- (Manitoba) Tanner Horgan
- (Saskatchewan) Kirk Muyres
- (United States) Rich Ruohonen
- (Alberta) Karsten Sturmay
- (Netherlands) Jaap van Dorp

Regional teams:

- (New Brunswick) James Grattan
- (New Brunswick) Scott Jones
- (Nova Scotia) Jamie Murphy
- (Newfoundland and Labrador) Greg Smith
- (Nova Scotia) Chad Stevens
- (Nova Scotia) Kendal Thompson
- (Nova Scotia) Stuart Thompson

=== Women ===
==== Tier 1 ====
Top Order of Merit women's teams as of October 1:

1. (Ontario) Rachel Homan
2. (Sweden) Anna Hasselborg
3. (Manitoba) Kerri Einarson
4. (Switzerland) Silvana Tirinzoni
5. (Manitoba) Jennifer Jones
6. (Alberta) Chelsea Carey
7. (Manitoba) Tracy Fleury
8. (Japan) Satsuki Fujisawa
9. (Saskatchewan) Robyn Silvernagle
10. (Alberta) Casey Scheidegger
11. (Scotland) ~~Eve Muirhead~~
12. (Japan) Sayaka Yoshimura
13. (Switzerland) Elena Stern
14. (Manitoba) ~~Theresa Cannon~~
15. (Russia) ~~Anna Sidorova~~
16. (Alberta) Kelsey Rocque
17. (Japan) ~~Seina Nakajima~~
18. (Sweden) Isabella Wranå
19. (China) ~~Mei Jie~~
20. (China) ~~Jiang Yilun~~
21. (South Korea) ~~Gim Un-chi~~
22. (United States) Nina Roth

==== Tier 2 ====
Order of Merit teams:

- (Ontario) Megan Balsdon
- (British Columbia) Corryn Brown
- (Ontario) Hollie Duncan
- (Switzerland) Binia Feltscher
- (Germany) Daniela Jentsch
- (South Korea) Kim Min-ji
- (Ontario) Jestyn Murphy
- (Manitoba) Beth Peterson
- (Quebec) Laurie St-Georges
- (Alberta) Laura Walker

Regional teams:

- (Nova Scotia) Mary-Anne Arsenault
- (Prince Edward Island) Suzanne Birt
- (Nova Scotia) Jill Brothers
- (New Brunswick) Andrea Crawford
- (Newfoundland and Labrador) Mackenzie Glynn
- (Nova Scotia) Tanya Hilliard

== Men ==
=== Tier 1 ===
==== Teams ====
The teams are listed as follows:

| Skip | Third | Second | Lead | Locale |
|---|---|---|---|---|
| Brendan Bottcher | Darren Moulding | Brad Thiessen | Karrick Martin | Edmonton, Alberta |
| Benoît Schwarz (Fourth) | Sven Michel | Peter de Cruz (Skip) | Valentin Tanner | Geneva, Switzerland |
| Matt Dunstone | Braeden Moskowy | Catlin Schneider | Dustin Kidby | Regina, Saskatchewan |
| Niklas Edin | Oskar Eriksson | Rasmus Wranå | Christoffer Sundgren | Karlstad, Sweden |
| John Epping | Ryan Fry | Mat Camm | Brent Laing | Toronto, Ontario |
| Jason Gunnlaugson | Alex Forrest | Adam Casey | Connor Njegovan | Winnipeg, Manitoba |
| Brad Gushue | Mark Nichols | Brett Gallant | Geoff Walker | St. John's, Newfoundland and Labrador |
| Glenn Howard | Scott Howard | David Mathers | Tim March | Penetanguishene, Ontario |
| Brad Jacobs | Marc Kennedy | E. J. Harnden | Ryan Harnden | Sault Ste. Marie, Ontario |
| Kevin Koe | John Morris (Note: John Morris spared for B. J. Neufeld, who was on paternity leave, on Team Koe.) | Colton Flasch | Ben Hebert | Calgary, Alberta |
| Scott McDonald | Jonathan Beuk | Wesley Forget | Scott Chadwick | Kingston, Ontario |
| Mike McEwen | Reid Carruthers | Derek Samagalski | Colin Hodgson | Winnipeg, Manitoba |
| Bruce Mouat | Grant Hardie | Bobby Lammie | Hammy McMillan Jr. | Edinburgh, Scotland |
| Yannick Schwaller | Michael Brunner | Romano Meier | Marcel Käufeler | Bern, Switzerland |
| John Shuster | Chris Plys | Matt Hamilton | John Landsteiner | Duluth, United States |

==== Round-robin standings ====
Final round-robin standings

Key
| Teams to Playoffs |
| Teams to Tiebreakers |

| Pool A | W | L | PF | PA |
|---|---|---|---|---|
| (Alberta) Kevin Koe | 3 | 1 | 23 | 16 |
| (United States) John Shuster | 3 | 1 | 26 | 17 |
| (Manitoba) Mike McEwen | 2 | 2 | 22 | 25 |
| (Scotland) Bruce Mouat | 2 | 2 | 22 | 21 |
| (Switzerland) Peter de Cruz | 0 | 4 | 15 | 29 |

| Pool B | W | L | PF | PA |
|---|---|---|---|---|
| (Newfoundland and Labrador) Brad Gushue | 4 | 0 | 27 | 13 |
| (Ontario) Glenn Howard | 3 | 1 | 20 | 15 |
| (Sweden) Niklas Edin | 2 | 2 | 16 | 17 |
| (Ontario) John Epping | 1 | 3 | 17 | 24 |
| (Ontario) Scott McDonald | 0 | 4 | 14 | 25 |

| Pool C | W | L | PF | PA |
|---|---|---|---|---|
| (Alberta) Brendan Bottcher | 4 | 0 | 31 | 20 |
| (Ontario) Brad Jacobs | 3 | 1 | 23 | 17 |
| (Manitoba) Jason Gunnlaugson | 2 | 2 | 21 | 19 |
| (Saskatchewan) Matt Dunstone | 1 | 3 | 17 | 22 |
| (Switzerland) Yannick Schwaller | 0 | 4 | 15 | 29 |

==== Round-robin results ====
All draw times are listed in Atlantic Time (UTC−04:00).

===== Draw 1 =====
Tuesday, November 5, 7:00 pm

| Sheet B | 1 | 2 | 3 | 4 | 5 | 6 | 7 | 8 | Final |
| (Scotland) Bruce Mouat | 0 | 0 | 1 | 0 | 2 | 0 | 2 | 0 | 5 |
| (United States) John Shuster 🔨 | 0 | 2 | 0 | 3 | 0 | 1 | 0 | 1 | 7 |

| Sheet E | 1 | 2 | 3 | 4 | 5 | 6 | 7 | 8 | Final |
| (Newfoundland and Labrador) Brad Gushue 🔨 | 1 | 1 | 0 | 2 | 0 | 1 | 0 | 1 | 6 |
| (Ontario) Scott McDonald | 0 | 0 | 1 | 0 | 2 | 0 | 1 | 0 | 4 |

===== Draw 2 =====
Wednesday, November 6, 8:00 am

| Sheet B | 1 | 2 | 3 | 4 | 5 | 6 | 7 | 8 | Final |
| (Alberta) Brendan Bottcher | 0 | 1 | 0 | 1 | 0 | 2 | 0 | 3 | 7 |
| (Saskatchewan) Matt Dunstone 🔨 | 2 | 0 | 1 | 0 | 1 | 0 | 1 | 0 | 5 |

| Sheet D | 1 | 2 | 3 | 4 | 5 | 6 | 7 | 8 | Final |
| (Switzerland) Yannick Schwaller 🔨 | 1 | 0 | 1 | 1 | 1 | 0 | 1 | 0 | 5 |
| (Manitoba) Jason Gunnlaugson | 0 | 2 | 0 | 0 | 0 | 2 | 0 | 2 | 6 |

| Sheet E | 1 | 2 | 3 | 4 | 5 | 6 | 7 | 8 | Final |
| (Sweden) Niklas Edin | 1 | 0 | 0 | 0 | 0 | 1 | 0 | 0 | 2 |
| (Ontario) Glenn Howard 🔨 | 0 | 1 | 1 | 1 | 1 | 0 | 0 | 1 | 5 |

===== Draw 3 =====
Wednesday, November 6, 12:00 pm

| Sheet C | 1 | 2 | 3 | 4 | 5 | 6 | 7 | 8 | Final |
| (Ontario) John Epping 🔨 | 0 | 3 | 0 | 2 | 0 | 0 | 0 | 2 | 7 |
| (Ontario) Scott McDonald | 1 | 0 | 0 | 0 | 1 | 1 | 1 | 0 | 4 |

| Sheet D | 1 | 2 | 3 | 4 | 5 | 6 | 7 | 8 | 9 | Final |
| (Alberta) Kevin Koe 🔨 | 1 | 0 | 0 | 2 | 0 | 0 | 1 | 0 | 3 | 7 |
| (Manitoba) Mike McEwen | 0 | 0 | 1 | 0 | 0 | 1 | 0 | 2 | 0 | 4 |

| Sheet E | 1 | 2 | 3 | 4 | 5 | 6 | 7 | 8 | Final |
| (Switzerland) Peter de Cruz 🔨 | 0 | 1 | 0 | 0 | 0 | 1 | 0 | X | 2 |
| (Scotland) Bruce Mouat | 1 | 0 | 0 | 1 | 1 | 0 | 4 | X | 7 |

===== Draw 4 =====
Wednesday, November 6, 4:00 pm

| Sheet D | 1 | 2 | 3 | 4 | 5 | 6 | 7 | 8 | Final |
| (Alberta) Brendan Bottcher | 0 | 2 | 0 | 0 | 3 | 0 | 4 | X | 9 |
| (Ontario) Brad Jacobs 🔨 | 1 | 0 | 2 | 0 | 0 | 1 | 0 | X | 4 |

| Sheet E | 1 | 2 | 3 | 4 | 5 | 6 | 7 | 8 | Final |
| (Switzerland) Yannick Schwaller | 0 | 0 | 1 | 0 | 0 | X | X | X | 1 |
| (Saskatchewan) Matt Dunstone 🔨 | 0 | 1 | 0 | 4 | 3 | X | X | X | 8 |

===== Draw 5 =====
Wednesday, November 6, 8:00 pm

| Sheet A | 1 | 2 | 3 | 4 | 5 | 6 | 7 | 8 | Final |
| (Newfoundland and Labrador) Brad Gushue 🔨 | 1 | 0 | 3 | 1 | 0 | 2 | X | X | 7 |
| (Sweden) Niklas Edin | 0 | 1 | 0 | 0 | 2 | 0 | X | X | 3 |

| Sheet C | 1 | 2 | 3 | 4 | 5 | 6 | 7 | 8 | Final |
| (Manitoba) Mike McEwen 🔨 | 1 | 0 | 2 | 0 | 0 | 2 | 0 | 1 | 6 |
| (United States) John Shuster | 0 | 2 | 0 | 2 | 0 | 0 | 0 | 0 | 4 |

===== Draw 6 =====
Thursday, November 7, 8:00 am

| Sheet A | 1 | 2 | 3 | 4 | 5 | 6 | 7 | 8 | Final |
| (Alberta) Brendan Bottcher | 0 | 3 | 0 | 1 | 0 | 0 | 3 | 2 | 9 |
| (Switzerland) Yannick Schwaller 🔨 | 3 | 0 | 2 | 0 | 0 | 1 | 0 | 0 | 6 |

| Sheet B | 1 | 2 | 3 | 4 | 5 | 6 | 7 | 8 | 9 | Final |
| (Switzerland) Peter de Cruz | 0 | 0 | 2 | 0 | 2 | 0 | 2 | 0 | 0 | 6 |
| (Manitoba) Mike McEwen 🔨 | 1 | 0 | 0 | 1 | 0 | 2 | 0 | 2 | 1 | 7 |

| Sheet D | 1 | 2 | 3 | 4 | 5 | 6 | 7 | 8 | Final |
| (Ontario) Glenn Howard 🔨 | 2 | 0 | 2 | 1 | 0 | 0 | 3 | X | 8 |
| (Ontario) Scott McDonald | 0 | 2 | 0 | 0 | 1 | 0 | 0 | X | 3 |

===== Draw 7 =====
Thursday, November 7, 12:00 pm

| Sheet E | 1 | 2 | 3 | 4 | 5 | 6 | 7 | 8 | Final |
| (Ontario) Brad Jacobs 🔨 | 2 | 0 | 1 | 0 | 2 | 1 | 0 | X | 6 |
| (Manitoba) Jason Gunnlaugson | 0 | 1 | 0 | 1 | 0 | 0 | 1 | X | 3 |

===== Draw 8 =====
Thursday, November 7, 4:00 pm

| Sheet A | 1 | 2 | 3 | 4 | 5 | 6 | 7 | 8 | Final |
| (Alberta) Kevin Koe 🔨 | 2 | 1 | 0 | 1 | 2 | 1 | X | X | 7 |
| (Scotland) Bruce Mouat | 0 | 0 | 2 | 0 | 0 | 0 | X | X | 2 |

| Sheet C | 1 | 2 | 3 | 4 | 5 | 6 | 7 | 8 | Final |
| (Newfoundland and Labrador) Brad Gushue 🔨 | 0 | 1 | 0 | 0 | 1 | 0 | 4 | X | 6 |
| (Ontario) Glenn Howard | 0 | 0 | 0 | 1 | 0 | 1 | 0 | X | 2 |

| Sheet D | 1 | 2 | 3 | 4 | 5 | 6 | 7 | 8 | Final |
| (Ontario) John Epping | 0 | 1 | 0 | 0 | 1 | 0 | X | X | 2 |
| (Sweden) Niklas Edin 🔨 | 1 | 0 | 3 | 2 | 0 | 1 | X | X | 7 |

| Sheet E | 1 | 2 | 3 | 4 | 5 | 6 | 7 | 8 | Final |
| (Switzerland) Peter de Cruz | 0 | 0 | 1 | 0 | 1 | 1 | 0 | X | 3 |
| (United States) John Shuster 🔨 | 1 | 1 | 0 | 2 | 0 | 0 | 5 | X | 9 |

===== Draw 9 =====
Thursday, November 7, 8:00 pm

| Sheet A | 1 | 2 | 3 | 4 | 5 | 6 | 7 | 8 | Final |
| (Saskatchewan) Matt Dunstone 🔨 | 0 | 0 | 0 | 2 | 0 | 0 | X | X | 2 |
| (Manitoba) Jason Gunnlaugson | 0 | 1 | 2 | 0 | 2 | 2 | X | X | 7 |

| Sheet B | 1 | 2 | 3 | 4 | 5 | 6 | 7 | 8 | Final |
| (Ontario) Brad Jacobs 🔨 | 0 | 0 | 4 | 1 | 0 | 1 | 0 | X | 6 |
| (Switzerland) Yannick Schwaller | 1 | 0 | 0 | 0 | 1 | 0 | 1 | X | 3 |

===== Draw 10 =====
Friday, November 8, 8:00 am

| Sheet B | 1 | 2 | 3 | 4 | 5 | 6 | 7 | 8 | Final |
| (Alberta) Kevin Koe 🔨 | 0 | 1 | 0 | 0 | 2 | 2 | 0 | 1 | 6 |
| (Switzerland) Peter de Cruz | 1 | 0 | 1 | 1 | 0 | 0 | 1 | 0 | 4 |

===== Draw 11 =====
Friday, November 8, 12:00 pm

| Sheet A | 1 | 2 | 3 | 4 | 5 | 6 | 7 | 8 | Final |
| (Ontario) John Epping | 0 | 1 | 1 | 0 | 1 | 0 | 1 | 0 | 4 |
| (Ontario) Glenn Howard 🔨 | 1 | 0 | 0 | 2 | 0 | 1 | 0 | 1 | 5 |

| Sheet C | 1 | 2 | 3 | 4 | 5 | 6 | 7 | 8 | Final |
| (Ontario) Brad Jacobs 🔨 | 0 | 6 | 0 | 1 | 0 | X | X | X | 7 |
| (Saskatchewan) Matt Dunstone | 0 | 0 | 1 | 0 | 1 | X | X | X | 2 |

| Sheet D | 1 | 2 | 3 | 4 | 5 | 6 | 7 | 8 | 9 | Final |
| (Alberta) Brendan Bottcher | 0 | 0 | 0 | 3 | 0 | 1 | 0 | 1 | 1 | 6 |
| (Manitoba) Jason Gunnlaugson 🔨 | 0 | 2 | 1 | 0 | 2 | 0 | 0 | 0 | 0 | 5 |

===== Draw 12 =====
Friday, November 8, 4:00 pm

| Sheet B | 1 | 2 | 3 | 4 | 5 | 6 | 7 | 8 | Final |
| (Sweden) Niklas Edin 🔨 | 1 | 0 | 1 | 0 | 1 | 0 | 0 | 1 | 4 |
| (Ontario) Scott McDonald | 0 | 1 | 0 | 1 | 0 | 0 | 1 | 0 | 3 |

===== Draw 13 =====
Friday, November 8, 8:00 pm

| Sheet B | 1 | 2 | 3 | 4 | 5 | 6 | 7 | 8 | Final |
| (Ontario) John Epping | 0 | 1 | 0 | 0 | 3 | 0 | 0 | X | 4 |
| (Newfoundland and Labrador) Brad Gushue 🔨 | 1 | 0 | 0 | 2 | 0 | 2 | 3 | X | 8 |

| Sheet C | 1 | 2 | 3 | 4 | 5 | 6 | 7 | 8 | Final |
| (Manitoba) Mike McEwen | 0 | 2 | 0 | 1 | 0 | 0 | 2 | 0 | 5 |
| (Scotland) Bruce Mouat 🔨 | 2 | 0 | 2 | 0 | 3 | 0 | 0 | 1 | 8 |

| Sheet D | 1 | 2 | 3 | 4 | 5 | 6 | 7 | 8 | Final |
| (Alberta) Kevin Koe 🔨 | 0 | 1 | 0 | 0 | 1 | 0 | 1 | 0 | 3 |
| (United States) John Shuster | 1 | 0 | 0 | 2 | 0 | 1 | 0 | 1 | 6 |

===== Tiebreakers =====
Saturday, November 9, 8:30 am

| Sheet B | 1 | 2 | 3 | 4 | 5 | 6 | 7 | 8 | Final |
| (Manitoba) Mike McEwen 🔨 | 3 | 0 | 2 | 0 | 2 | 0 | X | X | 7 |
| (Scotland) Bruce Mouat | 0 | 1 | 0 | 1 | 0 | 1 | X | X | 3 |

Player percentages
| (Manitoba) Team McEwen | | (Scotland) Team Mouat | |
|---|---|---|---|
| Colin Hodgson | 95% | Hammy McMillan Jr. | 96% |
| Derek Samagalski | 87% | Bobby Lammie | 97% |
| Reid Carruthers | 100% | Grant Hardie | 72% |
| Mike McEwen | 90% | Bruce Mouat | 85% |
| Total | 93% | Total | 87% |

| Sheet D | 1 | 2 | 3 | 4 | 5 | 6 | 7 | 8 | Final |
| (Sweden) Niklas Edin | 0 | 2 | 1 | 0 | 0 | 1 | 0 | 2 | 6 |
| (Manitoba) Jason Gunnlaugson 🔨 | 1 | 0 | 0 | 2 | 1 | 0 | 1 | 0 | 5 |

Player percentages
| (Sweden) Team Edin | | (Manitoba) Team Gunnlaugson | |
|---|---|---|---|
| Christoffer Sundgren | 99% | Connor Njegovan | 96% |
| Rasmus Wranå | 97% | Adam Casey | 82% |
| Oskar Eriksson | 91% | Alex Forrest | 63% |
| Niklas Edin | 88% | Jason Gunnlaugson | 74% |
| Total | 94% | Total | 79% |

==== Playoffs ====
Quarterfinals
1 | (Newfoundland and Labrador) Brad Gushue | 4
8 | (Sweden) Niklas Edin | 3
4 | (Alberta) Kevin Koe | 6
5 | (United States) John Shuster | 1
2 | (Alberta) Brendan Bottcher | 6
7 | (Manitoba) Mike McEwen | 2
3 | (Ontario) Brad Jacobs | 7
6 | (Ontario) Glenn Howard | 5

Semifinals
1 | (Newfoundland and Labrador) Brad Gushue | 6
4 | (Alberta) Kevin Koe | 3
2 | (Alberta) Brendan Bottcher | 3
3 | (Ontario) Brad Jacobs | 7

Final
1 | (Newfoundland and Labrador) Brad Gushue | 4
3 | (Ontario) Brad Jacobs | 6

===== Quarterfinals =====
Saturday, November 9, 4:30 pm

| Sheet A | 1 | 2 | 3 | 4 | 5 | 6 | 7 | 8 | Final |
| (Newfoundland and Labrador) Brad Gushue 🔨 | 1 | 0 | 0 | 1 | 0 | 1 | 0 | 1 | 4 |
| (Sweden) Niklas Edin | 0 | 1 | 0 | 0 | 0 | 0 | 2 | 0 | 3 |

Player percentages
| (Newfoundland and Labrador) Team Gushue | | (Sweden) Team Edin | |
|---|---|---|---|
| Geoff Walker | 86% | Christoffer Sundgren | 89% |
| Brett Gallant | 89% | Rasmus Wranå | 86% |
| Mark Nichols | 97% | Oskar Eriksson | 89% |
| Brad Gushue | 96% | Niklas Edin | 94% |
| Total | 92% | Total | 90% |

| Sheet B | 1 | 2 | 3 | 4 | 5 | 6 | 7 | 8 | Final |
| (Alberta) Kevin Koe 🔨 | 0 | 2 | 1 | 1 | 0 | 2 | X | X | 6 |
| (United States) John Shuster | 0 | 0 | 0 | 0 | 1 | 0 | X | X | 1 |

Player percentages
| (Alberta) Team Koe | | (United States) Team Shuster | |
|---|---|---|---|
| Ben Hebert | 90% | John Landsteiner | 100% |
| Colton Flasch | 84% | Matt Hamilton | 88% |
| John Morris | 90% | Chris Plys | 89% |
| Kevin Koe | 92% | John Shuster | 72% |
| Total | 89% | Total | 87% |

| Sheet C | 1 | 2 | 3 | 4 | 5 | 6 | 7 | 8 | Final |
| (Alberta) Brendan Bottcher 🔨 | 0 | 3 | 0 | 0 | 0 | 1 | 2 | X | 6 |
| (Manitoba) Mike McEwen | 0 | 0 | 2 | 0 | 0 | 0 | 0 | X | 2 |

Player percentages
| (Alberta) Team Bottcher | | (Manitoba) Team McEwen | |
|---|---|---|---|
| Karrick Martin | 90% | Colin Hodgson | 90% |
| Brad Thiessen | 88% | Derek Samagalski | 86% |
| Darren Moulding | 87% | Reid Carruthers | 92% |
| Brendan Bottcher | 85% | Mike McEwen | 67% |
| Total | 87% | Total | 84% |

| Sheet D | 1 | 2 | 3 | 4 | 5 | 6 | 7 | 8 | Final |
| (Ontario) Brad Jacobs 🔨 | 1 | 0 | 0 | 2 | 0 | 3 | 0 | 1 | 7 |
| (Ontario) Glenn Howard | 0 | 0 | 2 | 0 | 3 | 0 | 0 | 0 | 5 |

Player percentages
| (Ontario) Team Jacobs | | (Ontario) Team Howard | |
|---|---|---|---|
| Ryan Harnden | 83% | Tim March | 90% |
| E. J. Harnden | 83% | David Mathers | 92% |
| Marc Kennedy | 87% | Scott Howard | 85% |
| Brad Jacobs | 93% | Glenn Howard | 83% |
| Total | 86% | Total | 88% |

===== Semifinals =====
Saturday, November 9, 8:30 pm

| Sheet A | 1 | 2 | 3 | 4 | 5 | 6 | 7 | 8 | Final |
| (Alberta) Brendan Bottcher 🔨 | 0 | 1 | 0 | 1 | 0 | 1 | 0 | X | 3 |
| (Ontario) Brad Jacobs | 0 | 0 | 2 | 0 | 4 | 0 | 1 | X | 7 |

Player percentages
| (Alberta) Team Bottcher | | (Ontario) Team Jacobs | |
|---|---|---|---|
| Karrick Martin | 77% | Ryan Harnden | 95% |
| Brad Thiessen | 80% | E. J. Harnden | 97% |
| Darren Moulding | 89% | Marc Kennedy | 100% |
| Brendan Bottcher | 82% | Brad Jacobs | 99% |
| Total | 82% | Total | 98% |

| Sheet C | 1 | 2 | 3 | 4 | 5 | 6 | 7 | 8 | Final |
| (Newfoundland and Labrador) Brad Gushue 🔨 | 2 | 2 | 0 | 1 | 0 | 0 | 1 | X | 6 |
| (Alberta) Kevin Koe | 0 | 0 | 2 | 0 | 1 | 0 | 0 | X | 3 |

Player percentages
| (Newfoundland and Labrador) Team Gushue | | (Alberta) Team Koe | |
|---|---|---|---|
| Geoff Walker | 85% | Ben Hebert | 93% |
| Brett Gallant | 86% | Colton Flasch | 86% |
| Mark Nichols | 84% | John Morris | 71% |
| Brad Gushue | 97% | Kevin Koe | 88% |
| Total | 88% | Total | 85% |

===== Final =====
Sunday, November 10, 4:30 pm

| Sheet C | 1 | 2 | 3 | 4 | 5 | 6 | 7 | 8 | Final |
| (Newfoundland and Labrador) Brad Gushue 🔨 | 2 | 0 | 0 | 1 | 0 | 1 | 0 | 0 | 4 |
| (Ontario) Brad Jacobs | 0 | 1 | 1 | 0 | 0 | 0 | 3 | 1 | 6 |

Player percentages
| (Newfoundland and Labrador) Team Gushue | | (Ontario) Team Jacobs | |
|---|---|---|---|
| Geoff Walker | 85% | Ryan Harnden | 89% |
| Brett Gallant | 71% | E. J. Harnden | 76% |
| Mark Nichols | 72% | Marc Kennedy | 76% |
| Brad Gushue | 83% | Brad Jacobs | 79% |
| Total | 77% | Total | 80% |

=== Tier 2 ===
==== Teams ====
The teams are listed as follows:

| Skip | Third | Second | Lead | Alternate | Locale |
|---|---|---|---|---|---|
| Cameron Bryce | Craig Waddell | Gregor Cannon | Derrick Sloan | | Stirling, Scotland |
| Braden Calvert | Kyle Kurz | Ian McMillan | Rob Gordon | | Winnipeg, Manitoba |
| Korey Dropkin | Thomas Howell | Mark Fenner | Alex Fenson | Joe Polo | Chaska, United States |
| Mike Fournier | Félix Asselin | William Dion | Jean-François Trépanier | Émile Asselin | Montreal, Quebec |
| James Grattan | Chris Jeffrey | Andy McCann | Jamie Brannen | | Oromocto, New Brunswick |
| Tanner Horgan | Colton Lott | Kyle Doering | Tanner Lott | | Winnipeg Beach, Manitoba |
| Scott Jones | Jeremy Mallais | Brian King | Robert Daley | | Moncton, New Brunswick |
| Jamie Murphy | Paul Flemming | Scott Saccary | Taylor Ardiel | | Halifax, Nova Scotia |
| Kirk Muyres | Kevin Marsh | Dan Marsh | Dallan Muyres | | Saskatoon, Saskatchewan |
| Greg Persinger (Fourth) | Rich Ruohonen (Skip) | Colin Hufman | Phil Tilker | Kroy Nernberger | Minneapolis, United States |
| Greg Smith | Randy Smith | John Sheppard | Ian Withycombe | | St. John's, Newfoundland and Labrador |
| Chad Stevens | Peter Burgess | Graham Breckon | Kelly Mittelstadt | | Truro, Nova Scotia |
| Karsten Sturmay | Tristan Steinke | Jason Ginter | Glenn Venance | | Edmonton, Alberta |
| Kendal Thompson | Bryce Everist | Chris MacRae | Michael Brophy | | Halifax, Nova Scotia |
| Stuart Thompson | Colton Steele | Cameron MacKenzie | Travis Colter | | Dartmouth, Nova Scotia |
| Wouter Gösgens (Fourth) | Jaap van Dorp (Skip) | Laurens Hoekman | Carlo Glasbergen | | Zoetermeer, Netherlands |

==== Round-robin standings ====
Final round-robin standings

Key
| Teams to Playoffs |
| Teams to Tiebreakers |

| Pool A | W | L | PF | PA |
|---|---|---|---|---|
| (Scotland) Cameron Bryce | 4 | 0 | 32 | 14 |
| (Netherlands) Jaap van Dorp | 2 | 2 | 22 | 25 |
| (Saskatchewan) Kirk Muyres | 2 | 2 | 20 | 21 |
| (Newfoundland and Labrador) Greg Smith | 0 | 4 | 13 | 27 |

| Pool B | W | L | PF | PA |
|---|---|---|---|---|
| (Quebec) Mike Fournier | 4 | 0 | 34 | 13 |
| (New Brunswick) Scott Jones | 2 | 2 | 17 | 22 |
| (Manitoba) Braden Calvert | 1 | 3 | 18 | 27 |
| (Nova Scotia) Stuart Thompson | 1 | 3 | 15 | 22 |

| Pool C | W | L | PF | PA |
|---|---|---|---|---|
| (Manitoba) Tanner Horgan | 4 | 0 | 29 | 11 |
| (Nova Scotia) Jamie Murphy | 2 | 2 | 21 | 20 |
| (United States) Rich Ruohonen | 2 | 2 | 19 | 23 |
| (New Brunswick) James Grattan | 1 | 3 | 18 | 25 |

| Pool D | W | L | PF | PA |
|---|---|---|---|---|
| (United States) Korey Dropkin | 2 | 2 | 23 | 18 |
| (Alberta) Karsten Sturmay | 2 | 2 | 19 | 18 |
| (Nova Scotia) Chad Stevens | 2 | 2 | 22 | 24 |
| (Nova Scotia) Kendal Thompson | 1 | 3 | 13 | 25 |

==== Round-robin results ====
All draw times are listed in Atlantic Time (UTC−04:00).

===== Draw 1 =====
Tuesday, November 5, 7:00 pm

| Sheet E | 1 | 2 | 3 | 4 | 5 | 6 | 7 | 8 | Final |
| (New Brunswick) Scott Jones 🔨 | 0 | 2 | 0 | 0 | 1 | 1 | 2 | X | 6 |
| (Newfoundland and Labrador) Greg Smith | 1 | 0 | 1 | 1 | 0 | 0 | 0 | X | 3 |

===== Draw 2 =====
Wednesday, November 6, 8:00 am

| Sheet A | 1 | 2 | 3 | 4 | 5 | 6 | 7 | 8 | Final |
| (Alberta) Karsten Sturmay | 0 | 0 | 1 | 0 | 0 | 3 | 0 | 3 | 7 |
| (Nova Scotia) Chad Stevens 🔨 | 1 | 3 | 0 | 1 | 0 | 0 | 1 | 0 | 6 |

| Sheet C | 1 | 2 | 3 | 4 | 5 | 6 | 7 | 8 | Final |
| (Saskatchewan) Kirk Muyres | 0 | 0 | 2 | 0 | 1 | 0 | 0 | X | 3 |
| (Scotland) Cameron Bryce 🔨 | 3 | 2 | 0 | 1 | 0 | 1 | 2 | X | 9 |

| Sheet E | 1 | 2 | 3 | 4 | 5 | 6 | 7 | 8 | Final |
| (Nova Scotia) Jamie Murphy 🔨 | 1 | 0 | 2 | 0 | 5 | 1 | X | X | 9 |
| (Nova Scotia) Kendal Thompson | 0 | 1 | 0 | 1 | 0 | 0 | X | X | 2 |

===== Draw 3 =====
Wednesday, November 6, 12:00 pm

| Sheet B | 1 | 2 | 3 | 4 | 5 | 6 | 7 | 8 | Final |
| (Manitoba) Tanner Horgan | 0 | 3 | 0 | 0 | 0 | 2 | 2 | X | 7 |
| (New Brunswick) James Grattan 🔨 | 1 | 0 | 1 | 1 | 1 | 0 | 0 | X | 4 |

| Sheet D | 1 | 2 | 3 | 4 | 5 | 6 | 7 | 8 | Final |
| (Netherlands) Jaap van Dorp 🔨 | 0 | 1 | 0 | 1 | 0 | 1 | 0 | X | 3 |
| (Quebec) Mike Fournier | 1 | 0 | 4 | 0 | 2 | 0 | 1 | X | 8 |

===== Draw 4 =====
Wednesday, November 6, 4:00 pm

| Sheet A | 1 | 2 | 3 | 4 | 5 | 6 | 7 | 8 | Final |
| (Manitoba) Braden Calvert | 0 | 0 | 1 | 0 | 1 | X | X | X | 2 |
| (Nova Scotia) Stuart Thompson 🔨 | 3 | 2 | 0 | 2 | 0 | X | X | X | 7 |

| Sheet B | 1 | 2 | 3 | 4 | 5 | 6 | 7 | 8 | Final |
| (United States) Rich Ruohonen 🔨 | 0 | 0 | 0 | 2 | 0 | 0 | 2 | 0 | 4 |
| (Nova Scotia) Jamie Murphy | 1 | 0 | 1 | 0 | 0 | 2 | 0 | 1 | 5 |

| Sheet C | 1 | 2 | 3 | 4 | 5 | 6 | 7 | 8 | Final |
| (United States) Korey Dropkin | 1 | 0 | 4 | 0 | 2 | 0 | 1 | X | 8 |
| (Nova Scotia) Chad Stevens 🔨 | 0 | 1 | 0 | 1 | 0 | 1 | 0 | X | 3 |

| Sheet D | 1 | 2 | 3 | 4 | 5 | 6 | 7 | 8 | Final |
| (Scotland) Cameron Bryce | 0 | 1 | 0 | 1 | 4 | 0 | 2 | X | 8 |
| (Newfoundland and Labrador) Greg Smith 🔨 | 2 | 0 | 1 | 0 | 0 | 1 | 0 | X | 4 |

===== Draw 5 =====
Wednesday, November 6, 8:00 pm

| Sheet B | 1 | 2 | 3 | 4 | 5 | 6 | 7 | 8 | Final |
| (Quebec) Mike Fournier 🔨 | 2 | 0 | 0 | 2 | 0 | 0 | 3 | X | 7 |
| (New Brunswick) Scott Jones | 0 | 1 | 0 | 0 | 1 | 1 | 0 | X | 3 |

===== Draw 6 =====
Thursday, November 7, 8:00 am

| Sheet B | 1 | 2 | 3 | 4 | 5 | 6 | 7 | 8 | 9 | Final |
| (Netherlands) Jaap van Dorp | 0 | 1 | 1 | 2 | 0 | 2 | 0 | 0 | 0 | 6 |
| (Scotland) Cameron Bryce 🔨 | 3 | 0 | 0 | 0 | 2 | 0 | 0 | 1 | 2 | 8 |

| Sheet C | 1 | 2 | 3 | 4 | 5 | 6 | 7 | 8 | Final |
| (Alberta) Karsten Sturmay 🔨 | 1 | 1 | 1 | 0 | 2 | 1 | X | X | 6 |
| (Nova Scotia) Kendal Thompson | 0 | 0 | 0 | 1 | 0 | 0 | X | X | 1 |

| Sheet E | 1 | 2 | 3 | 4 | 5 | 6 | 7 | 8 | Final |
| (Manitoba) Braden Calvert 🔨 | 2 | 0 | 0 | 1 | 0 | 1 | 0 | X | 4 |
| (Quebec) Mike Fournier | 0 | 2 | 2 | 0 | 1 | 0 | 6 | X | 11 |

===== Draw 7 =====
Thursday, November 7, 12:00 pm

| Sheet A | 1 | 2 | 3 | 4 | 5 | 6 | 7 | 8 | Final |
| (Saskatchewan) Kirk Muyres 🔨 | 2 | 0 | 0 | 0 | 1 | 2 | 1 | X | 6 |
| (Newfoundland and Labrador) Greg Smith | 0 | 1 | 1 | 0 | 0 | 0 | 0 | X | 2 |

| Sheet D | 1 | 2 | 3 | 4 | 5 | 6 | 7 | 8 | 9 | Final |
| (United States) Rich Ruohonen | 0 | 1 | 2 | 0 | 1 | 1 | 0 | 0 | 1 | 6 |
| (United States) Korey Dropkin 🔨 | 1 | 0 | 0 | 1 | 0 | 0 | 0 | 3 | 0 | 5 |

===== Draw 8 =====
Thursday, November 7, 4:00 pm

| Sheet A | 1 | 2 | 3 | 4 | 5 | 6 | 7 | 8 | 9 | Final |
| (Nova Scotia) Jamie Murphy 🔨 | 2 | 0 | 0 | 1 | 1 | 0 | 0 | 1 | 0 | 5 |
| (New Brunswick) James Grattan | 0 | 2 | 0 | 0 | 0 | 2 | 1 | 0 | 1 | 6 |

| Sheet C | 1 | 2 | 3 | 4 | 5 | 6 | 7 | 8 | Final |
| (Manitoba) Braden Calvert 🔨 | 0 | 0 | 2 | 1 | 1 | 0 | 4 | X | 8 |
| (New Brunswick) Scott Jones | 0 | 1 | 0 | 0 | 0 | 2 | 0 | X | 3 |

| Sheet D | 1 | 2 | 3 | 4 | 5 | 6 | 7 | 8 | Final |
| (Nova Scotia) Kendal Thompson 🔨 | 1 | 0 | 0 | 1 | 0 | 2 | 0 | X | 4 |
| (Nova Scotia) Chad Stevens | 0 | 2 | 2 | 0 | 1 | 0 | 2 | X | 7 |

===== Draw 9 =====
Thursday, November 7, 8:00 pm

| Sheet C | 1 | 2 | 3 | 4 | 5 | 6 | 7 | 8 | Final |
| (Quebec) Mike Fournier | 1 | 0 | 2 | 0 | 5 | X | X | X | 8 |
| (Nova Scotia) Stuart Thompson 🔨 | 0 | 2 | 0 | 1 | 0 | X | X | X | 3 |

| Sheet D | 1 | 2 | 3 | 4 | 5 | 6 | 7 | 8 | Final |
| (Manitoba) Tanner Horgan 🔨 | 1 | 0 | 0 | 0 | 1 | 0 | 0 | 2 | 4 |
| (Alberta) Karsten Sturmay | 0 | 1 | 0 | 0 | 0 | 2 | 0 | 0 | 3 |

| Sheet E | 1 | 2 | 3 | 4 | 5 | 6 | 7 | 8 | Final |
| (Saskatchewan) Kirk Muyres 🔨 | 2 | 0 | 2 | 0 | 0 | 1 | 0 | 0 | 5 |
| (Netherlands) Jaap van Dorp | 0 | 1 | 0 | 3 | 0 | 0 | 1 | 1 | 6 |

===== Draw 10 =====
Friday, November 8, 8:00 am

| Sheet B | 1 | 2 | 3 | 4 | 5 | 6 | 7 | 8 | Final |
| (United States) Korey Dropkin 🔨 | 0 | 0 | 2 | 0 | 1 | 0 | 0 | X | 3 |
| (Nova Scotia) Kendal Thompson | 0 | 1 | 0 | 2 | 0 | 2 | 1 | X | 6 |

| Sheet C | 1 | 2 | 3 | 4 | 5 | 6 | 7 | 8 | Final |
| (United States) Rich Ruohonen 🔨 | 1 | 0 | 2 | 0 | 0 | 2 | 2 | X | 7 |
| (New Brunswick) James Grattan | 0 | 1 | 0 | 2 | 0 | 0 | 0 | X | 3 |

| Sheet E | 1 | 2 | 3 | 4 | 5 | 6 | 7 | 8 | Final |
| (Scotland) Cameron Bryce 🔨 | 1 | 2 | 1 | 0 | 3 | X | X | X | 7 |
| (Nova Scotia) Stuart Thompson | 0 | 0 | 0 | 1 | 0 | X | X | X | 1 |

===== Draw 11 =====
Friday, November 8, 12:00 pm

| Sheet C | 1 | 2 | 3 | 4 | 5 | 6 | 7 | 8 | Final |
| (Manitoba) Tanner Horgan 🔨 | 0 | 6 | 0 | 2 | 0 | X | X | X | 8 |
| (Nova Scotia) Jamie Murphy | 0 | 0 | 1 | 0 | 1 | X | X | X | 2 |

===== Draw 12 =====
Friday, November 8, 4:00 pm

| Sheet B | 1 | 2 | 3 | 4 | 5 | 6 | 7 | 8 | Final |
| (Saskatchewan) Kirk Muyres 🔨 | 2 | 0 | 0 | 2 | 0 | 1 | 0 | 1 | 6 |
| (Manitoba) Braden Calvert | 0 | 0 | 1 | 0 | 2 | 0 | 1 | 0 | 4 |

| Sheet C | 1 | 2 | 3 | 4 | 5 | 6 | 7 | 8 | Final |
| (Netherlands) Jaap van Dorp 🔨 | 1 | 0 | 4 | 0 | 0 | 1 | 0 | 1 | 7 |
| (Newfoundland and Labrador) Greg Smith | 0 | 1 | 0 | 1 | 1 | 0 | 1 | 0 | 4 |

| Sheet E | 1 | 2 | 3 | 4 | 5 | 6 | 7 | 8 | Final |
| (Nova Scotia) Chad Stevens | 1 | 2 | 1 | 0 | 0 | 0 | 0 | 2 | 6 |
| (New Brunswick) James Grattan 🔨 | 0 | 0 | 0 | 4 | 0 | 1 | 0 | 0 | 5 |

===== Draw 13 =====
Friday, November 8, 8:00 pm

| Sheet A | 1 | 2 | 3 | 4 | 5 | 6 | 7 | 8 | Final |
| (United States) Rich Ruohonen | 0 | 0 | 2 | 0 | 0 | X | X | X | 2 |
| (Manitoba) Tanner Horgan 🔨 | 2 | 2 | 0 | 5 | 1 | X | X | X | 10 |

| Sheet D | 1 | 2 | 3 | 4 | 5 | 6 | 7 | 8 | Final |
| (Nova Scotia) Stuart Thompson | 0 | 1 | 0 | 1 | 0 | 0 | 2 | 0 | 4 |
| (New Brunswick) Scott Jones 🔨 | 0 | 0 | 2 | 0 | 0 | 2 | 0 | 1 | 5 |

| Sheet E | 1 | 2 | 3 | 4 | 5 | 6 | 7 | 8 | Final |
| (United States) Korey Dropkin 🔨 | 0 | 2 | 0 | 3 | 0 | 0 | 2 | X | 7 |
| (Alberta) Karsten Sturmay | 0 | 0 | 2 | 0 | 1 | 0 | 0 | X | 3 |

===== Tiebreakers =====
Saturday, November 9, 8:30 am

| Sheet A | 1 | 2 | 3 | 4 | 5 | 6 | 7 | 8 | Final |
| (New Brunswick) Scott Jones | 0 | 0 | 1 | 0 | 1 | 0 | 0 | 0 | 2 |
| (United States) Rich Ruohonen 🔨 | 0 | 1 | 0 | 2 | 0 | 1 | 0 | 2 | 6 |

Player percentages
| (New Brunswick) Team Jones | | (United States) Team Ruohonen | |
|---|---|---|---|
| Robert Daley | 90% | Phil Tilker | 90% |
| Brian King | 85% | Colin Hufman | 80% |
| Jeremy Mallais | 96% | Rich Ruohonen | 91% |
| Scott Jones | 83% | Greg Persinger | 86% |
| Total | 89% | Total | 87% |

| Sheet B | 1 | 2 | 3 | 4 | 5 | 6 | 7 | 8 | Final |
| (Nova Scotia) Jamie Murphy 🔨 | 1 | 0 | 2 | 0 | 1 | 2 | 0 | 2 | 8 |
| (Nova Scotia) Chad Stevens | 0 | 2 | 0 | 2 | 0 | 0 | 1 | 0 | 5 |

Player percentages
| (Nova Scotia) Team Murphy | | (Nova Scotia) Team Stevens | |
|---|---|---|---|
| Taylor Ardiel | 99% | Kelly Mittelstadt | 95% |
| Scott Saccary | 82% | Graham Breckon | 82% |
| Paul Flemming | 100% | Peter Burgess | 94% |
| Jamie Murphy | 94% | Chad Stevens | 87% |
| Total | 93% | Total | 89% |

Saturday, November 9, 12:30 pm

| Sheet A | 1 | 2 | 3 | 4 | 5 | 6 | 7 | 8 | Final |
| (United States) Korey Dropkin 🔨 | 1 | 1 | 0 | 2 | 0 | 1 | 0 | 1 | 6 |
| (Alberta) Karsten Sturmay | 0 | 0 | 1 | 0 | 1 | 0 | 3 | 0 | 5 |

Player percentages
| (United States) Team Dropkin | | (Alberta) Team Sturmay | |
|---|---|---|---|
| Alex Fenson | 85% | Glenn Venance | 86% |
| Mark Fenner | 90% | Jason Ginter | 96% |
| Thomas Howell | 88% | Tristan Steinke | 74% |
| Korey Dropkin | 83% | Karsten Sturmay | 87% |
| Total | 87% | Total | 86% |

==== Playoffs ====
Quarterfinals
1 | (Manitoba) Tanner Horgan | 6
8 | (United States) Rich Ruohonen | 3
4 | (Netherlands) Jaap van Dorp | 6
5 | (Saskatchewan) Kirk Muyres | 7
2 | (Scotland) Cameron Bryce | 6
7 | (United States) Korey Dropkin | 7
3 | (Quebec) Mike Fournier | 9
6 | (Nova Scotia) Jamie Murphy | 3

Semifinals
1 | (Manitoba) Tanner Horgan | 6
5 | (Saskatchewan) Kirk Muyres | 3
7 | (United States) Korey Dropkin | 7
3 | (Quebec) Mike Fournier | 1

Final
1 | (Manitoba) Tanner Horgan | 4
7 | (United States) Korey Dropkin | 5

===== Quarterfinals =====
Saturday, November 9, 4:30 pm

| Sheet B | 1 | 2 | 3 | 4 | 5 | 6 | 7 | 8 | 9 | Final |
| (Netherlands) Jaap van Dorp 🔨 | 1 | 0 | 1 | 2 | 0 | 1 | 0 | 1 | 0 | 6 |
| (Saskatchewan) Kirk Muyres | 0 | 2 | 0 | 0 | 3 | 0 | 1 | 0 | 1 | 7 |

Player percentages
| (Netherlands) Team van Dorp | | (Saskatchewan) Team Muyres | |
|---|---|---|---|
| Carlo Glasbergen | 89% | Dallan Muyres | 96% |
| Laurens Hoekman | 92% | Dan Marsh | 97% |
| Jaap van Dorp | 76% | Kevin Marsh | 98% |
| Wouter Gösgens | 81% | Kirk Muyres | 84% |
| Total | 85% | Total | 94% |

| Sheet C | 1 | 2 | 3 | 4 | 5 | 6 | 7 | 8 | Final |
| (Quebec) Mike Fournier 🔨 | 2 | 0 | 2 | 0 | 4 | 1 | X | X | 9 |
| (Nova Scotia) Jamie Murphy | 0 | 1 | 0 | 2 | 0 | 0 | X | X | 3 |

Player percentages
| (Quebec) Team Fournier | | (Nova Scotia) Team Murphy | |
|---|---|---|---|
| Jean-François Trépanier | 95% | Taylor Ardiel | 73% |
| William Dion | 91% | Scott Saccary | 93% |
| Félix Asselin | 100% | Paul Flemming | 90% |
| Mike Fournier | 93% | Jamie Murphy | 75% |
| Total | 95% | Total | 83% |

| Sheet D | 1 | 2 | 3 | 4 | 5 | 6 | 7 | 8 | Final |
| (Manitoba) Tanner Horgan 🔨 | 2 | 1 | 1 | 0 | 2 | 0 | 0 | X | 6 |
| (United States) Rich Ruohonen | 0 | 0 | 0 | 1 | 0 | 2 | 0 | X | 3 |

Player percentages
| (Manitoba) Team Horgan | | (United States) Team Ruohonen | |
|---|---|---|---|
| Tanner Lott | 93% | Phil Tilker | 97% |
| Kyle Doering | 89% | Colin Hufman | 84% |
| Colton Lott | 93% | Rich Ruohonen | 91% |
| Tanner Horgan | 90% | Greg Persinger | 78% |
| Total | 91% | Total | 87% |

| Sheet E | 1 | 2 | 3 | 4 | 5 | 6 | 7 | 8 | Final |
| (Scotland) Cameron Bryce 🔨 | 2 | 0 | 0 | 2 | 0 | 0 | 2 | 0 | 6 |
| (United States) Korey Dropkin | 0 | 0 | 2 | 0 | 3 | 1 | 0 | 1 | 7 |

Player percentages
| (Scotland) Team Bryce | | (United States) Team Dropkin | |
|---|---|---|---|
| Derrick Sloan | 80% | Thomas Howell | 83% |
| Gregor Cannon | 79% | Mark Fenner | 75% |
| Craig Waddell | 84% | Joe Polo | 85% |
| Cameron Bryce | 80% | Korey Dropkin | 86% |
| Total | 81% | Total | 82% |

===== Semifinals =====
Saturday, November 9, 8:30 pm

| Sheet D | 1 | 2 | 3 | 4 | 5 | 6 | 7 | 8 | Final |
| (United States) Korey Dropkin | 2 | 0 | 0 | 4 | 1 | X | X | X | 7 |
| (Quebec) Mike Fournier 🔨 | 0 | 1 | 0 | 0 | 0 | X | X | X | 1 |

Player percentages
| (United States) Team Dropkin | | (Quebec) Team Fournier | |
|---|---|---|---|
| Thomas Howell | 89% | Jean-François Trépanier | 94% |
| Mark Fenner | 78% | William Dion | 70% |
| Joe Polo | 83% | Félix Asselin | 73% |
| Korey Dropkin | 92% | Mike Fournier | 55% |
| Total | 85% | Total | 73% |

| Sheet E | 1 | 2 | 3 | 4 | 5 | 6 | 7 | 8 | Final |
| (Manitoba) Tanner Horgan 🔨 | 0 | 1 | 0 | 2 | 0 | 0 | 2 | 1 | 6 |
| (Saskatchewan) Kirk Muyres | 0 | 0 | 2 | 0 | 0 | 1 | 0 | 0 | 3 |

Player percentages
| (Manitoba) Team Horgan | | (Saskatchewan) Team Muyres | |
|---|---|---|---|
| Tanner Lott | 84% | Dallan Muyres | 94% |
| Kyle Doering | 86% | Dan Marsh | 82% |
| Colton Lott | 84% | Kevin Marsh | 91% |
| Tanner Horgan | 86% | Kirk Muyres | 81% |
| Total | 83% | Total | 87% |

===== Final =====
Sunday, November 10, 4:30 pm

| Sheet A | 1 | 2 | 3 | 4 | 5 | 6 | 7 | 8 | Final |
| (Manitoba) Tanner Horgan 🔨 | 2 | 0 | 0 | 1 | 0 | 0 | 1 | 0 | 4 |
| (United States) Korey Dropkin | 0 | 1 | 0 | 0 | 2 | 1 | 0 | 1 | 5 |

Player percentages
| (Manitoba) Team Horgan | | (United States) Team Dropkin | |
|---|---|---|---|
| Tanner Lott | 89% | Thomas Howell | 74% |
| Kyle Doering | 90% | Mark Fenner | 81% |
| Colton Lott | 84% | Joe Polo | 84% |
| Tanner Horgan | 79% | Korey Dropkin | 79% |
| Total | 85% | Total | 79% |

== Women ==
=== Tier 1 ===
==== Teams ====
The teams are listed as follows:

| Skip | Third | Second | Lead | Locale |
|---|---|---|---|---|
| Chelsea Carey | Sarah Wilkes | Dana Ferguson | Rachelle Brown | Calgary, Alberta |
| Kerri Einarson | Val Sweeting | Shannon Birchard | Briane Meilleur | Gimli, Manitoba |
| Tracy Fleury | Selena Njegovan | Liz Fyfe | Kristin MacCuish | East St. Paul, Manitoba |
| Satsuki Fujisawa | Chinami Yoshida | Yumi Suzuki | Yurika Yoshida | Kitami, Japan |
| Anna Hasselborg | Sara McManus | Agnes Knochenhauer | Sofia Mabergs | Sundbyberg, Sweden |
| Rachel Homan | Emma Miskew | Joanne Courtney | Lisa Weagle | Ottawa, Ontario |
| Jennifer Jones | Kaitlyn Lawes | Jocelyn Peterman | Dawn McEwen | Winnipeg, Manitoba |
| Kelsey Rocque | Danielle Schmiemann | Rebecca Hebert | Jesse Marlow | Edmonton, Alberta |
| Tabitha Peterson (Note: Tabitha Peterson skipped Team Roth with Nina Roth on maternity leave.) | Becca Hamilton | Tara Peterson | Aileen Geving | McFarland, United States |
| Amber Holland (Note: Amber Holland replaced Casey Scheidegger, who was due to give birth.) | Cary-Anne McTaggart | Jessie Haughian | Kristie Moore | Lethbridge, Alberta |
| Robyn Silvernagle | Stefanie Lawton | Jessie Hunkin | Kara Thevenot | North Battleford, Saskatchewan |
| Briar Hürlimann (Fourth) | Elena Stern (Skip) | Lisa Gisler | Céline Koller | Brig, Switzerland |
| Alina Pätz (Fourth) | Silvana Tirinzoni (Skip) | Esther Neuenschwander | Melanie Barbezat | Aarau, Switzerland |
| Isabella Wranå | Jennie Wåhlin | Almida de Val | Fanny Sjöberg | Stockholm, Sweden |
| Sayaka Yoshimura | Kaho Onodera | Anna Ohmiya | Yumie Funayama | Sapporo, Japan |

==== Round-robin standings ====
Final round-robin standings

Key
| Teams to Playoffs |
| Teams to Tiebreakers |

| Pool A | W | L | PF | PA |
|---|---|---|---|---|
| (Japan) Satsuki Fujisawa | 3 | 1 | 24 | 19 |
| (Alberta) Kelsey Rocque | 2 | 2 | 27 | 24 |
| (Manitoba) Jennifer Jones | 2 | 2 | 23 | 25 |
| (Ontario) Rachel Homan | 2 | 2 | 20 | 28 |
| (Japan) Sayaka Yoshimura | 1 | 3 | 24 | 22 |

| Pool B | W | L | PF | PA |
|---|---|---|---|---|
| (United States) Team Roth | 4 | 0 | 26 | 17 |
| (Manitoba) Tracy Fleury | 3 | 1 | 17 | 13 |
| (Manitoba) Kerri Einarson | 2 | 2 | 22 | 20 |
| (Sweden) Isabella Wranå | 1 | 3 | 20 | 24 |
| (Alberta) Chelsea Carey | 0 | 4 | 16 | 27 |

| Pool C | W | L | PF | PA |
|---|---|---|---|---|
| (Switzerland) Silvana Tirinzoni | 4 | 0 | 28 | 10 |
| (Sweden) Anna Hasselborg | 3 | 1 | 17 | 20 |
| (Saskatchewan) Robyn Silvernagle | 2 | 2 | 18 | 18 |
| (Alberta) Team Scheidegger | 1 | 3 | 13 | 22 |
| (Switzerland) Elena Stern | 0 | 4 | 18 | 24 |

==== Round-robin results ====
All draw times are listed in Atlantic Time (UTC−04:00).

===== Draw 1 =====
Tuesday, November 5, 7:00 pm

| Sheet A | 1 | 2 | 3 | 4 | 5 | 6 | 7 | 8 | 9 | Final |
| (Japan) Satsuki Fujisawa 🔨 | 0 | 1 | 0 | 2 | 0 | 1 | 0 | 1 | 1 | 6 |
| (Japan) Sayaka Yoshimura | 1 | 0 | 1 | 0 | 2 | 0 | 1 | 0 | 0 | 5 |

| Sheet D | 1 | 2 | 3 | 4 | 5 | 6 | 7 | 8 | Final |
| (Ontario) Rachel Homan | 0 | 1 | 0 | 4 | 0 | 0 | 0 | 2 | 7 |
| (Alberta) Kelsey Rocque 🔨 | 0 | 0 | 2 | 0 | 3 | 1 | 0 | 0 | 6 |

===== Draw 2 =====
Wednesday, November 6, 8:00 am

| Sheet A | 1 | 2 | 3 | 4 | 5 | 6 | 7 | 8 | Final |
| (Manitoba) Tracy Fleury 🔨 | 0 | 2 | 0 | 0 | 4 | 0 | 0 | X | 6 |
| (Sweden) Isabella Wranå | 0 | 0 | 0 | 0 | 0 | 2 | 1 | X | 3 |

| Sheet C | 1 | 2 | 3 | 4 | 5 | 6 | 7 | 8 | Final |
| (Sweden) Anna Hasselborg 🔨 | 0 | 2 | 1 | 2 | 0 | 0 | 1 | X | 6 |
| (Switzerland) Elena Stern | 1 | 0 | 0 | 0 | 2 | 1 | 0 | X | 4 |

===== Draw 3 =====
Wednesday, November 6, 12:00 pm

| Sheet A | 1 | 2 | 3 | 4 | 5 | 6 | 7 | 8 | Final |
| (Manitoba) Jennifer Jones 🔨 | 0 | 0 | 1 | 0 | 2 | 1 | 0 | X | 4 |
| (Alberta) Kelsey Rocque | 3 | 1 | 0 | 4 | 0 | 0 | 1 | X | 9 |

| Sheet B | 1 | 2 | 3 | 4 | 5 | 6 | 7 | 8 | Final |
| (Switzerland) Silvana Tirinzoni | 0 | 1 | 2 | 0 | 0 | 0 | 1 | 0 | 4 |
| (Saskatchewan) Robyn Silvernagle 🔨 | 0 | 0 | 0 | 2 | 0 | 0 | 0 | 0 | 2 |

===== Draw 4 =====
Wednesday, November 6, 4:00 pm

| Sheet A | 1 | 2 | 3 | 4 | 5 | 6 | 7 | 8 | Final |
| (Manitoba) Kerri Einarson 🔨 | 2 | 0 | 2 | 0 | 2 | 0 | 0 | 1 | 7 |
| (Alberta) Chelsea Carey | 0 | 1 | 0 | 2 | 0 | 2 | 0 | 0 | 5 |

| Sheet B | 1 | 2 | 3 | 4 | 5 | 6 | 7 | 8 | 9 | Final |
| (Sweden) Anna Hasselborg | 0 | 0 | 1 | 0 | 0 | 0 | 2 | 0 | 1 | 4 |
| (Alberta) Team Scheidegger 🔨 | 0 | 0 | 0 | 1 | 0 | 1 | 0 | 1 | 0 | 3 |

| Sheet C | 1 | 2 | 3 | 4 | 5 | 6 | 7 | 8 | Final |
| (United States) Team Roth | 0 | 0 | 0 | 0 | 3 | 1 | 1 | X | 5 |
| (Manitoba) Tracy Fleury 🔨 | 0 | 0 | 1 | 1 | 0 | 0 | 0 | X | 2 |

===== Draw 5 =====
Wednesday, November 6, 8:00 pm

| Sheet B | 1 | 2 | 3 | 4 | 5 | 6 | 7 | 8 | Final |
| (Manitoba) Jennifer Jones | 0 | 1 | 0 | 3 | 0 | 1 | 1 | X | 6 |
| (Japan) Satsuki Fujisawa 🔨 | 1 | 0 | 1 | 0 | 1 | 0 | 0 | X | 3 |

| Sheet E | 1 | 2 | 3 | 4 | 5 | 6 | 7 | 8 | Final |
| (Ontario) Rachel Homan | 0 | 3 | 2 | 0 | 0 | 1 | 0 | 1 | 7 |
| (Japan) Sayaka Yoshimura 🔨 | 2 | 0 | 0 | 1 | 1 | 0 | 1 | 0 | 5 |

===== Draw 6 =====
Thursday, November 7, 8:00 am

| Sheet E | 1 | 2 | 3 | 4 | 5 | 6 | 7 | 8 | Final |
| (Alberta) Chelsea Carey | 0 | 0 | 2 | 1 | 0 | 1 | 0 | X | 4 |
| (United States) Team Roth 🔨 | 1 | 3 | 0 | 0 | 2 | 0 | 1 | X | 7 |

===== Draw 7 =====
Thursday, November 7, 12:00 pm

| Sheet A | 1 | 2 | 3 | 4 | 5 | 6 | 7 | 8 | Final |
| (Saskatchewan) Robyn Silvernagle 🔨 | 0 | 2 | 0 | 1 | 0 | 2 | 0 | 1 | 6 |
| (Switzerland) Elena Stern | 0 | 0 | 2 | 0 | 1 | 0 | 1 | 0 | 4 |

| Sheet B | 1 | 2 | 3 | 4 | 5 | 6 | 7 | 8 | Final |
| (Japan) Sayaka Yoshimura 🔨 | 2 | 0 | 0 | 1 | 0 | 2 | 0 | 0 | 5 |
| (Alberta) Kelsey Rocque | 0 | 1 | 0 | 0 | 2 | 0 | 2 | 1 | 6 |

| Sheet C | 1 | 2 | 3 | 4 | 5 | 6 | 7 | 8 | Final |
| (Manitoba) Kerri Einarson | 0 | 0 | 0 | 2 | 0 | 0 | 0 | X | 2 |
| (Manitoba) Tracy Fleury 🔨 | 1 | 0 | 1 | 0 | 0 | 1 | 1 | X | 4 |

| Sheet D | 1 | 2 | 3 | 4 | 5 | 6 | 7 | 8 | Final |
| (Switzerland) Silvana Tirinzoni 🔨 | 1 | 1 | 1 | 0 | 1 | 4 | X | X | 8 |
| (Sweden) Anna Hasselborg | 0 | 0 | 0 | 1 | 0 | 0 | X | X | 1 |

===== Draw 8 =====
Thursday, November 7, 4:00 pm

| Sheet B | 1 | 2 | 3 | 4 | 5 | 6 | 7 | 8 | Final |
| (Sweden) Isabella Wranå | 0 | 0 | 1 | 0 | 3 | 0 | 1 | 0 | 5 |
| (United States) Team Roth 🔨 | 2 | 0 | 0 | 2 | 0 | 2 | 0 | 1 | 7 |

===== Draw 9 =====
Thursday, November 7, 8:00 pm

| Sheet C | 1 | 2 | 3 | 4 | 5 | 6 | 7 | 8 | Final |
| (Ontario) Rachel Homan | 0 | 1 | 2 | 0 | 1 | 0 | 0 | X | 4 |
| (Manitoba) Jennifer Jones 🔨 | 4 | 0 | 0 | 1 | 0 | 1 | 4 | X | 10 |

| Sheet D | 1 | 2 | 3 | 4 | 5 | 6 | 7 | 8 | 9 | Final |
| (Japan) Satsuki Fujisawa 🔨 | 0 | 1 | 0 | 2 | 0 | 2 | 1 | 0 | 2 | 8 |
| (Alberta) Kelsey Rocque | 2 | 0 | 1 | 0 | 1 | 0 | 0 | 2 | 0 | 6 |

| Sheet E | 1 | 2 | 3 | 4 | 5 | 6 | 7 | 8 | Final |
| (Switzerland) Silvana Tirinzoni 🔨 | 4 | 0 | 1 | 1 | 1 | 2 | X | X | 9 |
| (Alberta) Team Scheidegger | 0 | 1 | 0 | 0 | 0 | 0 | X | X | 1 |

===== Draw 10 =====
Friday, November 8, 8:00 am

| Sheet A | 1 | 2 | 3 | 4 | 5 | 6 | 7 | 8 | Final |
| (Manitoba) Kerri Einarson | 0 | 0 | 2 | 1 | 1 | 0 | 2 | 0 | 6 |
| (United States) Team Roth 🔨 | 2 | 3 | 0 | 0 | 0 | 1 | 0 | 1 | 7 |

| Sheet C | 1 | 2 | 3 | 4 | 5 | 6 | 7 | 8 | Final |
| (Alberta) Chelsea Carey | 0 | 2 | 0 | 0 | 2 | 0 | 0 | X | 4 |
| (Sweden) Isabella Wranå 🔨 | 3 | 0 | 0 | 2 | 0 | 1 | 2 | X | 8 |

| Sheet D | 1 | 2 | 3 | 4 | 5 | 6 | 7 | 8 | Final |
| (Alberta) Team Scheidegger 🔨 | 0 | 1 | 0 | 1 | 0 | 0 | 2 | 1 | 5 |
| (Switzerland) Elena Stern | 0 | 0 | 1 | 0 | 0 | 3 | 0 | 0 | 4 |

| Sheet E | 1 | 2 | 3 | 4 | 5 | 6 | 7 | 8 | Final |
| (Sweden) Anna Hasselborg 🔨 | 0 | 2 | 0 | 0 | 1 | 2 | 0 | 1 | 6 |
| (Saskatchewan) Robyn Silvernagle | 0 | 0 | 3 | 1 | 0 | 0 | 1 | 0 | 5 |

===== Draw 11 =====
Friday, November 8, 12:00 pm

| Sheet B | 1 | 2 | 3 | 4 | 5 | 6 | 7 | 8 | Final |
| (Ontario) Rachel Homan | 0 | 1 | 0 | 1 | 0 | 0 | X | X | 2 |
| (Japan) Satsuki Fujisawa 🔨 | 1 | 0 | 2 | 0 | 3 | 1 | X | X | 7 |

| Sheet E | 1 | 2 | 3 | 4 | 5 | 6 | 7 | 8 | Final |
| (Ontario) Jennifer Jones | 0 | 0 | 2 | 0 | 1 | 0 | 0 | X | 3 |
| (Japan) Sayaka Yoshimura 🔨 | 0 | 1 | 0 | 2 | 0 | 3 | 3 | X | 9 |

===== Draw 12 =====
Friday, November 8, 4:00 pm

| Sheet A | 1 | 2 | 3 | 4 | 5 | 6 | 7 | 8 | Final |
| (Switzerland) Silvana Tirinzoni 🔨 | 1 | 0 | 2 | 0 | 0 | 1 | 0 | 3 | 7 |
| (Switzerland) Elena Stern | 0 | 1 | 0 | 2 | 1 | 0 | 2 | 0 | 6 |

| Sheet C | 1 | 2 | 3 | 4 | 5 | 6 | 7 | 8 | Final |
| (Alberta) Team Scheidegger | 0 | 0 | 2 | 0 | 1 | 0 | 1 | 0 | 4 |
| (Saskatchewan) Robyn Silvernagle 🔨 | 1 | 1 | 0 | 1 | 0 | 1 | 0 | 1 | 5 |

| Sheet D | 1 | 2 | 3 | 4 | 5 | 6 | 7 | 8 | Final |
| (Alberta) Chelsea Carey 🔨 | 0 | 1 | 0 | 0 | 0 | 2 | 0 | 0 | 3 |
| (Manitoba) Tracy Fleury | 0 | 0 | 1 | 1 | 1 | 0 | 1 | 1 | 5 |

| Sheet E | 1 | 2 | 3 | 4 | 5 | 6 | 7 | 8 | Final |
| (Manitoba) Kerri Einarson | 0 | 0 | 0 | 2 | 0 | 1 | 0 | 4 | 7 |
| (Sweden) Isabella Wranå 🔨 | 0 | 0 | 1 | 0 | 1 | 0 | 2 | 0 | 4 |

===== Tiebreakers =====
Friday, November 8, 8:00 pm

| Sheet A | 1 | 2 | 3 | 4 | 5 | 6 | 7 | 8 | Final |
| (Saskatchewan) Robyn Silvernagle 🔨 | 1 | 1 | 0 | 1 | 0 | 0 | 0 | X | 3 |
| (Manitoba) Kerri Einarson | 0 | 0 | 2 | 0 | 2 | 1 | 1 | X | 6 |

Player percentages
| (Saskatchewan) Team Silvernagle | | (Manitoba) Team Einarson | |
|---|---|---|---|
| Kara Thevenot | 79% | Briane Meilleur | 84% |
| Jessie Hunkin | 69% | Shannon Birchard | 84% |
| Stefanie Lawton | 65% | Val Sweeting | 87% |
| Robyn Silvernagle | 74% | Kerri Einarson | 85% |
| Total | 72% | Total | 85% |

| Sheet E | 1 | 2 | 3 | 4 | 5 | 6 | 7 | 8 | 9 | Final |
| (Manitoba) Jennifer Jones 🔨 | 1 | 0 | 0 | 2 | 0 | 0 | 0 | 2 | 1 | 6 |
| (Ontario) Rachel Homan | 0 | 2 | 1 | 0 | 0 | 2 | 0 | 0 | 0 | 5 |

Player percentages
| (Manitoba) Team Jones | | (Ontario) Team Homan | |
|---|---|---|---|
| Dawn McEwen | 88% | Lisa Weagle | 100% |
| Jocelyn Peterman | 76% | Joanne Courtney | 93% |
| Kaitlyn Lawes | 73% | Emma Miskew | 74% |
| Jennifer Jones | 75% | Rachel Homan | 73% |
| Total | 78% | Total | 85% |

==== Playoffs ====
Quarterfinals
1 | (Switzerland) Silvana Tirinzoni | 5
8 | (Manitoba) Kerri Einarson | 6
4 | (Manitoba) Tracy Fleury | 4
5 | (Japan) Satsuki Fujisawa | 6
2 | (United States) Team Roth | 6
7 | (Manitoba) Jennifer Jones | 5
3 | (Sweden) Anna Hasselborg | 7
6 | (Alberta) Kelsey Rocque | 3

Semifinals
8 | (Manitoba) Kerri Einarson | 7
5 | (Japan) Satsuki Fujisawa | 4
2 | (United States) Team Roth | 5
3 | (Sweden) Anna Hasselborg | 8

Final
8 | (Manitoba) Kerri Einarson | 5
3 | (Sweden) Anna Hasselborg | 8

===== Quarterfinals =====
Saturday, November 9, 12:30 pm

| Sheet A | 1 | 2 | 3 | 4 | 5 | 6 | 7 | 8 | 9 | Final |
| (United States) Team Roth 🔨 | 0 | 0 | 1 | 0 | 2 | 0 | 2 | 0 | 1 | 6 |
| (Manitoba) Jennifer Jones | 0 | 2 | 0 | 1 | 0 | 1 | 0 | 1 | 0 | 5 |

Player percentages
| (United States) Team Roth | | (Manitoba) Team Jones | |
|---|---|---|---|
| Aileen Geving | 85% | Dawn McEwen | 84% |
| Tara Peterson | 69% | Jocelyn Peterman | 91% |
| Becca Hamilton | 73% | Kaitlyn Lawes | 78% |
| Tabitha Peterson | 76% | Jennifer Jones | 83% |
| Total | 76% | Total | 84% |

| Sheet B | 1 | 2 | 3 | 4 | 5 | 6 | 7 | 8 | Final |
| (Sweden) Anna Hasselborg 🔨 | 2 | 0 | 0 | 0 | 2 | 0 | 3 | X | 7 |
| (Alberta) Kelsey Rocque | 0 | 2 | 0 | 0 | 0 | 1 | 0 | X | 3 |

Player percentages
| (Sweden) Team Hasselborg | | (Alberta) Team Rocque | |
|---|---|---|---|
| Sofia Mabergs | 89% | Jesse Marlow | 89% |
| Agnes Knochenhauer | 76% | Rebecca Hebert | 79% |
| Sara McManus | 84% | Danielle Schmiemann | 87% |
| Anna Hasselborg | 100% | Kelsey Rocque | 85% |
| Total | 88% | Total | 85% |

| Sheet C | 1 | 2 | 3 | 4 | 5 | 6 | 7 | 8 | Final |
| (Switzerland) Silvana Tirinzoni 🔨 | 0 | 0 | 0 | 1 | 1 | 0 | 3 | 0 | 5 |
| (Manitoba) Kerri Einarson | 1 | 2 | 1 | 0 | 0 | 1 | 0 | 1 | 6 |

Player percentages
| (Switzerland) Team Tirinzoni | | (Manitoba) Team Einarson | |
|---|---|---|---|
| Melanie Barbezat | 97% | Briane Meilleur | 91% |
| Esther Neuenschwander | 89% | Shannon Birchard | 99% |
| Silvana Tirinzoni | 81% | Val Sweeting | 97% |
| Alina Pätz | 86% | Kerri Einarson | 92% |
| Total | 88% | Total | 95% |

| Sheet D | 1 | 2 | 3 | 4 | 5 | 6 | 7 | 8 | Final |
| (Manitoba) Tracy Fleury 🔨 | 1 | 1 | 0 | 1 | 0 | 1 | 0 | X | 4 |
| (Japan) Satsuki Fujisawa | 0 | 0 | 2 | 0 | 2 | 0 | 2 | X | 6 |

Player percentages
| (Manitoba) Team Fleury | | (Japan) Team Fujisawa | |
|---|---|---|---|
| Kristin MacCuish | 91% | Yurika Yoshida | 96% |
| Liz Fyfe | 93% | Yumi Suzuki | 87% |
| Selena Njegovan | 84% | Chinami Yoshida | 99% |
| Tracy Fleury | 90% | Satsuki Fujisawa | 99% |
| Total | 89% | Total | 95% |

===== Semifinals =====
Saturday, November 9, 8:30 pm

| Sheet B | 1 | 2 | 3 | 4 | 5 | 6 | 7 | 8 | Final |
| (Manitoba) Kerri Einarson | 3 | 0 | 0 | 2 | 0 | 1 | 0 | 1 | 7 |
| (Japan) Satsuki Fujisawa 🔨 | 0 | 1 | 0 | 0 | 2 | 0 | 1 | 0 | 4 |

Player percentages
| (Manitoba) Team Einarson | | (Japan) Team Fujisawa | |
|---|---|---|---|
| Briane Meilleur | 94% | Yurika Yoshida | 89% |
| Shannon Birchard | 91% | Yumi Suzuki | 68% |
| Val Sweeting | 96% | Chinami Yoshida | 91% |
| Kerri Einarson | 95% | Satsuki Fujisawa | 89% |
| Total | 94% | Total | 84% |

| Sheet D | 1 | 2 | 3 | 4 | 5 | 6 | 7 | 8 | Final |
| (United States) Team Roth 🔨 | 1 | 0 | 1 | 0 | 0 | 3 | 0 | X | 5 |
| (Sweden) Anna Hasselborg | 0 | 2 | 0 | 3 | 1 | 0 | 2 | X | 8 |

Player percentages
| (United States) Team Roth | | (Sweden) Team Hasselborg | |
|---|---|---|---|
| Aileen Geving | 93% | Sofia Mabergs | 83% |
| Tara Peterson | 70% | Agnes Knochenhauer | 90% |
| Becca Hamilton | 73% | Sara McManus | 89% |
| Tabitha Peterson | 74% | Anna Hasselborg | 95% |
| Total | 77% | Total | 89% |

===== Final =====
Sunday, November 10, 12:30 pm

| Sheet C | 1 | 2 | 3 | 4 | 5 | 6 | 7 | 8 | Final |
| (Manitoba) Kerri Einarson | 0 | 2 | 0 | 0 | 1 | 0 | 2 | 0 | 5 |
| (Sweden) Anna Hasselborg 🔨 | 1 | 0 | 3 | 0 | 0 | 3 | 0 | 1 | 8 |

Player percentages
| (Manitoba) Team Einarson | | (Sweden) Team Hasselborg | |
|---|---|---|---|
| Briane Meilleur | 89% | Sofia Mabergs | 83% |
| Shannon Birchard | 70% | Agnes Knochenhauer | 83% |
| Val Sweeting | 78% | Sara McManus | 82% |
| Kerri Einarson | 70% | Anna Hasselborg | 83% |
| Total | 77% | Total | 83% |

=== Tier 2 ===
==== Teams ====
The teams are listed as follows:

| Skip | Third | Second | Lead | Locale |
|---|---|---|---|---|
| Mary-Anne Arsenault | Christina Black | Jenn Baxter | Emma Logan | Dartmouth, Nova Scotia |
| Megan Balsdon | Lynn Kreviazuk | Rachelle Strybosch | Tess Bobbie | London, Ontario |
| Suzanne Birt | Marie Christianson | Meaghan Hughes | Michelle McQuaid | Charlottetown, Prince Edward Island |
| Jill Brothers | Erin Carmody | Sarah Murphy | Jenn Brine | Halifax, Nova Scotia |
| Corryn Brown | Erin Pincott | Dezaray Hawes | Ashley Klymchuk | Kamloops, British Columbia |
| Andrea Crawford | Jennifer Armstrong | Jillian Babin | Katie Forward | Fredericton, New Brunswick |
| Hollie Duncan | Laura Hickey | Cheryl Kreviazuk | Karen Trines | Toronto, Ontario |
| Binia Feltscher | Carole Howald | Stefanie Berset | Larissa Hari | Langenthal, Switzerland |
| Mackenzie Glynn | Camille Burt | Lauren Barron | Sarah Cassell | St. John's, Newfoundland and Labrador |
| Tanya Hilliard | Taylor Clarke | MacKenzie Proctor | Heather MacPhee | Halifax, Nova Scotia |
| Daniela Jentsch | Emira Abbes | Klara-Hermine Fomm | Analena Jentsch | Füssen, Germany |
| Kim Min-ji | Ha Seung-youn | Kim Hye-rin | Yang Tae-i | Chuncheon, South Korea |
| Jestyn Murphy | Carly Howard | Stephanie Matheson | Grace Holyoke | Mississauga, Ontario |
| Beth Peterson | Jenna Loder | Katherine Doerksen | Melissa Gordon | Winnipeg, Manitoba |
| Laurie St-Georges | Hailey Armstrong | Emily Riley | Cynthia St-Georges | Laval, Quebec |
| Laura Walker | Kate Cameron | Taylor McDonald | Nadine Scotland | Edmonton, Alberta |

==== Round-robin standings ====
Final round-robin standings

Key
| Teams to Playoffs |
| Teams to Tiebreakers |

| Pool A | W | L | PF | PA |
|---|---|---|---|---|
| (British Columbia) Corryn Brown | 3 | 1 | 17 | 16 |
| (Prince Edward Island) Suzanne Birt | 2 | 2 | 24 | 16 |
| (Germany) Daniela Jentsch | 1 | 3 | 15 | 25 |
| (Newfoundland and Labrador) Mackenzie Glynn | 0 | 4 | 9 | 26 |

| Pool B | W | L | PF | PA |
|---|---|---|---|---|
| (South Korea) Kim Min-ji | 3 | 1 | 23 | 12 |
| (Ontario) Hollie Duncan | 3 | 1 | 22 | 20 |
| (New Brunswick) Andrea Crawford | 2 | 2 | 24 | 20 |
| (Alberta) Laura Walker | 2 | 2 | 20 | 19 |

| Pool C | W | L | PF | PA |
|---|---|---|---|---|
| (Manitoba) Beth Peterson | 3 | 1 | 26 | 16 |
| (Ontario) Megan Balsdon | 2 | 2 | 20 | 20 |
| (Nova Scotia) Mary-Anne Arsenault | 2 | 2 | 21 | 23 |
| (Nova Scotia) Tanya Hilliard | 1 | 3 | 16 | 25 |

| Pool D | W | L | PF | PA |
|---|---|---|---|---|
| (Switzerland) Binia Feltscher | 3 | 1 | 24 | 11 |
| (Quebec) Laurie St-Georges | 2 | 2 | 20 | 15 |
| (Ontario) Jestyn Murphy | 2 | 2 | 16 | 25 |
| (Nova Scotia) Jill Brothers | 1 | 3 | 14 | 22 |

==== Round-robin results ====
All draw times are listed in Atlantic Time (UTC−04:00).

===== Draw 1 =====
Tuesday, November 5, 7:00 pm

| Sheet B | 1 | 2 | 3 | 4 | 5 | 6 | 7 | 8 | Final |
| (Switzerland) Binia Feltscher 🔨 | 2 | 0 | 0 | 0 | 0 | 1 | 0 | 0 | 3 |
| (Nova Scotia) Jill Brothers | 0 | 0 | 0 | 1 | 0 | 0 | 2 | 1 | 4 |

| Sheet C | 1 | 2 | 3 | 4 | 5 | 6 | 7 | 8 | Final |
| (South Korea) Kim Min-ji | 0 | 0 | 2 | 2 | 0 | 2 | 2 | X | 8 |
| (New Brunswick) Andrea Crawford 🔨 | 2 | 0 | 0 | 0 | 1 | 0 | 0 | X | 3 |

| Sheet D | 1 | 2 | 3 | 4 | 5 | 6 | 7 | 8 | 9 | Final |
| (Nova Scotia) Mary-Anne Arsenault | 0 | 0 | 1 | 0 | 2 | 0 | 3 | 0 | 1 | 7 |
| (Nova Scotia) Tanya Hilliard 🔨 | 0 | 1 | 0 | 1 | 0 | 3 | 0 | 1 | 0 | 6 |

===== Draw 2 =====
Wednesday, November 6, 8:00 am

| Sheet B | 1 | 2 | 3 | 4 | 5 | 6 | 7 | 8 | Final |
| (Ontario) Jestyn Murphy 🔨 | 0 | 2 | 0 | 1 | 0 | 2 | 0 | 1 | 6 |
| (Quebec) Laurie St-Georges | 1 | 0 | 1 | 0 | 1 | 0 | 1 | 0 | 4 |

| Sheet D | 1 | 2 | 3 | 4 | 5 | 6 | 7 | 8 | Final |
| (Germany) Daniela Jentsch 🔨 | 2 | 0 | 2 | 1 | 1 | 0 | 1 | X | 7 |
| (Newfoundland and Labrador) Mackenzie Glynn | 0 | 1 | 0 | 0 | 0 | 1 | 0 | X | 2 |

===== Draw 3 =====
Wednesday, November 6, 12:00 pm

| Sheet A | 1 | 2 | 3 | 4 | 5 | 6 | 7 | 8 | Final |
| (Alberta) Laura Walker | 1 | 0 | 0 | 0 | 2 | 1 | 0 | X | 4 |
| (New Brunswick) Andrea Crawford 🔨 | 0 | 3 | 1 | 2 | 0 | 0 | 3 | X | 9 |

| Sheet C | 1 | 2 | 3 | 4 | 5 | 6 | 7 | 8 | Final |
| (Prince Edward Island) Suzanne Birt | 0 | 0 | 1 | 0 | 0 | 1 | 0 | 0 | 2 |
| (British Columbia) Corryn Brown 🔨 | 0 | 1 | 0 | 1 | 1 | 0 | 0 | 1 | 4 |

| Sheet E | 1 | 2 | 3 | 4 | 5 | 6 | 7 | 8 | Final |
| (Ontario) Megan Balsdon 🔨 | 1 | 0 | 1 | 0 | 1 | 0 | 5 | X | 8 |
| (Manitoba) Beth Peterson | 0 | 2 | 0 | 1 | 0 | 2 | 0 | X | 5 |

===== Draw 4 =====
Wednesday, November 6, 4:00 pm

| Sheet E | 1 | 2 | 3 | 4 | 5 | 6 | 7 | 8 | Final |
| (Germany) Daniela Jentsch | 0 | 0 | 0 | 0 | 1 | 0 | 0 | X | 1 |
| (South Korea) Kim Min-ji 🔨 | 1 | 1 | 0 | 0 | 0 | 4 | 1 | X | 7 |

===== Draw 5 =====
Wednesday, November 6, 8:00 pm

| Sheet A | 1 | 2 | 3 | 4 | 5 | 6 | 7 | 8 | Final |
| (Switzerland) Binia Feltscher | 0 | 4 | 3 | 0 | 0 | 0 | 1 | X | 8 |
| (Ontario) Jestyn Murphy 🔨 | 0 | 0 | 0 | 1 | 1 | 1 | 0 | X | 3 |

| Sheet C | 1 | 2 | 3 | 4 | 5 | 6 | 7 | 8 | Final |
| (Nova Scotia) Mary-Anne Arsenault | 1 | 0 | 1 | 0 | 3 | 0 | 0 | 2 | 7 |
| (Nova Scotia) Jill Brothers 🔨 | 0 | 2 | 0 | 1 | 0 | 2 | 1 | 0 | 6 |

| Sheet D | 1 | 2 | 3 | 4 | 5 | 6 | 7 | 8 | Final |
| (Ontario) Hollie Duncan 🔨 | 2 | 0 | 0 | 2 | 0 | 0 | 0 | 1 | 5 |
| (New Brunswick) Andrea Crawford | 0 | 2 | 0 | 0 | 1 | 0 | 1 | 0 | 4 |

| Sheet E | 1 | 2 | 3 | 4 | 5 | 6 | 7 | 8 | Final |
| (Nova Scotia) Tanya Hilliard | 0 | 0 | 0 | 1 | 0 | 1 | 0 | X | 2 |
| (Quebec) Laurie St-Georges 🔨 | 1 | 1 | 2 | 0 | 2 | 0 | 3 | X | 9 |

===== Draw 6 =====
Thursday, November 7, 8:00 am

| Sheet A | 1 | 2 | 3 | 4 | 5 | 6 | 7 | 8 | Final |
| (Prince Edward Island) Suzanne Birt | 0 | 1 | 2 | 1 | 1 | 0 | 1 | X | 6 |
| (Newfoundland and Labrador) Mackenzie Glynn 🔨 | 1 | 0 | 0 | 0 | 0 | 1 | 0 | X | 2 |

| Sheet D | 1 | 2 | 3 | 4 | 5 | 6 | 7 | 8 | Final |
| (British Columbia) Corryn Brown | 0 | 0 | 0 | 0 | 1 | 0 | X | X | 1 |
| (Alberta) Laura Walker 🔨 | 2 | 0 | 1 | 2 | 0 | 1 | X | X | 6 |

===== Draw 7 =====
Thursday, November 7, 12:00 pm

| Sheet B | 1 | 2 | 3 | 4 | 5 | 6 | 7 | 8 | Final |
| (Ontario) Megan Balsdon | 2 | 0 | 0 | 2 | 0 | 1 | 0 | 1 | 6 |
| (Nova Scotia) Mary-Anne Arsenault 🔨 | 0 | 1 | 0 | 0 | 1 | 0 | 2 | 0 | 4 |

| Sheet C | 1 | 2 | 3 | 4 | 5 | 6 | 7 | 8 | Final |
| (Switzerland) Binia Feltscher | 1 | 0 | 2 | 2 | 2 | X | X | X | 7 |
| (Quebec) Laurie St-Georges 🔨 | 0 | 0 | 0 | 0 | 0 | X | X | X | 0 |

| Sheet E | 1 | 2 | 3 | 4 | 5 | 6 | 7 | 8 | Final |
| (Ontario) Jestyn Murphy 🔨 | 0 | 1 | 1 | 0 | 0 | 1 | 0 | 2 | 5 |
| (Nova Scotia) Jill Brothers | 0 | 0 | 0 | 1 | 0 | 0 | 3 | 0 | 4 |

===== Draw 8 =====
Thursday, November 7, 4:00 pm

| Sheet B | 1 | 2 | 3 | 4 | 5 | 6 | 7 | 8 | Final |
| (Manitoba) Beth Peterson 🔨 | 0 | 1 | 0 | 2 | 1 | 0 | 3 | X | 7 |
| (Nova Scotia) Tanya Hilliard | 0 | 0 | 2 | 0 | 0 | 1 | 0 | X | 3 |

| Sheet E | 1 | 2 | 3 | 4 | 5 | 6 | 7 | 8 | Final |
| (New Brunswick) Andrea Crawford 🔨 | 1 | 0 | 2 | 0 | 5 | 0 | X | X | 8 |
| (Newfoundland and Labrador) Mackenzie Glynn | 0 | 1 | 0 | 1 | 0 | 1 | X | X | 3 |

===== Draw 9 =====
Thursday, November 7, 8:00 pm

| Sheet A | 1 | 2 | 3 | 4 | 5 | 6 | 7 | 8 | Final |
| (South Korea) Kim Min-ji | 0 | 0 | 0 | 1 | 1 | 0 | 0 | 0 | 2 |
| (Ontario) Hollie Duncan 🔨 | 0 | 1 | 1 | 0 | 0 | 1 | 0 | 2 | 5 |

| Sheet B | 1 | 2 | 3 | 4 | 5 | 6 | 7 | 8 | Final |
| (Germany) Daniela Jentsch | 0 | 0 | 0 | 1 | 0 | X | X | X | 1 |
| (Prince Edward Island) Suzanne Birt 🔨 | 3 | 3 | 1 | 0 | 2 | X | X | X | 9 |

===== Draw 10 =====
Friday, November 8, 8:00 am

| Sheet A | 1 | 2 | 3 | 4 | 5 | 6 | 7 | 8 | Final |
| (Manitoba) Beth Peterson | 0 | 1 | 1 | 0 | 1 | 1 | 0 | 1 | 5 |
| (Nova Scotia) Mary-Anne Arsenault 🔨 | 1 | 0 | 0 | 1 | 0 | 0 | 1 | 0 | 3 |

| Sheet D | 1 | 2 | 3 | 4 | 5 | 6 | 7 | 8 | Final |
| (Ontario) Megan Balsdon | 0 | 2 | 1 | 0 | 0 | 0 | 1 | 0 | 4 |
| (Switzerland) Binia Feltscher 🔨 | 2 | 0 | 0 | 1 | 0 | 2 | 0 | 1 | 6 |

===== Draw 11 =====
Friday, November 8, 12:00 pm

| Sheet A | 1 | 2 | 3 | 4 | 5 | 6 | 7 | 8 | 9 | Final |
| (Germany) Daniela Jentsch 🔨 | 2 | 0 | 0 | 2 | 0 | 1 | 0 | 1 | 0 | 6 |
| (British Columbia) Corryn Brown | 0 | 3 | 1 | 0 | 1 | 0 | 1 | 0 | 1 | 7 |

| Sheet B | 1 | 2 | 3 | 4 | 5 | 6 | 7 | 8 | Final |
| (South Korea) Kim Min-ji 🔨 | 2 | 0 | 1 | 0 | 0 | 0 | 3 | X | 6 |
| (Alberta) Laura Walker | 0 | 2 | 0 | 0 | 0 | 1 | 0 | X | 3 |

| Sheet D | 1 | 2 | 3 | 4 | 5 | 6 | 7 | 8 | Final |
| (Nova Scotia) Jill Brothers | 0 | 0 | 0 | 0 | 0 | X | X | X | 0 |
| (Quebec) Laurie St-Georges 🔨 | 0 | 2 | 1 | 3 | 1 | X | X | X | 7 |

| Sheet E | 1 | 2 | 3 | 4 | 5 | 6 | 7 | 8 | Final |
| (Ontario) Hollie Duncan 🔨 | 0 | 3 | 3 | 0 | 2 | 0 | 0 | 1 | 9 |
| (Prince Edward Island) Suzanne Birt | 2 | 0 | 0 | 2 | 0 | 2 | 1 | 0 | 7 |

===== Draw 12 =====
Friday, November 8, 4:00 pm

| Sheet A | 1 | 2 | 3 | 4 | 5 | 6 | 7 | 8 | Final |
| (Ontario) Megan Balsdon 🔨 | 1 | 0 | 0 | 0 | 1 | 0 | 0 | X | 2 |
| (Nova Scotia) Tanya Hilliard | 0 | 0 | 1 | 1 | 0 | 1 | 2 | X | 5 |

| Sheet D | 1 | 2 | 3 | 4 | 5 | 6 | 7 | 8 | Final |
| (Manitoba) Beth Peterson | 3 | 2 | 0 | 1 | 0 | 3 | X | X | 9 |
| (Ontario) Jestyn Murphy 🔨 | 0 | 0 | 0 | 0 | 2 | 0 | X | X | 2 |

===== Draw 13 =====
Friday, November 8, 8:00 pm

| Sheet B | 1 | 2 | 3 | 4 | 5 | 6 | 7 | 8 | Final |
| (British Columbia) Corryn Brown 🔨 | 0 | 0 | 0 | 2 | 2 | 0 | 0 | 1 | 5 |
| (Newfoundland and Labrador) Mackenzie Glynn | 0 | 0 | 1 | 0 | 0 | 1 | 0 | 0 | 2 |

| Sheet C | 1 | 2 | 3 | 4 | 5 | 6 | 7 | 8 | Final |
| (Ontario) Hollie Duncan | 1 | 0 | 0 | 1 | 0 | 1 | 0 | X | 3 |
| (Alberta) Laura Walker 🔨 | 0 | 1 | 2 | 0 | 2 | 0 | 2 | X | 7 |

===== Tiebreakers =====
Saturday, November 9, 8:30 am

| Sheet C | 1 | 2 | 3 | 4 | 5 | 6 | 7 | 8 | Final |
| (Alberta) Laura Walker | 0 | 3 | 0 | 0 | 0 | 1 | 1 | 0 | 5 |
| (Prince Edward Island) Suzanne Birt 🔨 | 1 | 0 | 1 | 1 | 1 | 0 | 0 | 2 | 6 |

Player percentages
| (Alberta) Team Walker | | (Prince Edward Island) Team Birt | |
|---|---|---|---|
| Nadine Scotland | 80% | Michelle McQuaid | 77% |
| Taylor McDonald | 83% | Meaghan Hughes | 84% |
| Kate Cameron | 69% | Marie Christianson | 76% |
| Laura Walker | 69% | Suzanne Birt | 75% |
| Total | 75% | Total | 78% |

| Sheet D | 1 | 2 | 3 | 4 | 5 | 6 | 7 | 8 | Final |
| (Quebec) Laurie St-Georges | 0 | 0 | 1 | 0 | 2 | 2 | 0 | 0 | 5 |
| (Ontario) Megan Balsdon 🔨 | 0 | 2 | 0 | 2 | 0 | 0 | 1 | 1 | 6 |

Player percentages
| (Quebec) Team St-Georges | | (Ontario) Team Balsdon | |
|---|---|---|---|
| Cynthia St-Georges | 82% | Tess Bobbie | 80% |
| Emily Riley | 78% | Rachelle Strybosch | 72% |
| Hailey Armstrong | 89% | Lynn Kreviazuk | 89% |
| Laurie St-Georges | 66% | Megan Balsdon | 67% |
| Total | 79% | Total | 77% |

| Sheet E | 1 | 2 | 3 | 4 | 5 | 6 | 7 | 8 | 9 | Final |
| (New Brunswick) Andrea Crawford 🔨 | 2 | 0 | 0 | 1 | 1 | 0 | 0 | 2 | 0 | 6 |
| (Ontario) Jestyn Murphy | 0 | 2 | 1 | 0 | 0 | 2 | 1 | 0 | 1 | 7 |

Player percentages
| (New Brunswick) Team Crawford | | (Ontario) Team Murphy | |
|---|---|---|---|
| Katie Forward | 91% | Grace Holyoke | 95% |
| Jillian Babin | 86% | Stephanie Matheson | 82% |
| Jennifer Armstrong | 85% | Carly Howard | 79% |
| Andrea Crawford | 77% | Jestyn Murphy | 72% |
| Total | 85% | Total | 82% |

==== Playoffs ====
Quarterfinals
1 | (South Korea) Kim Min-ji | 5
8 | (Ontario) Megan Balsdon | 4
4 | (Switzerland) Binia Feltscher | 6
5 | (Manitoba) Beth Peterson | 7
2 | (Ontario) Hollie Duncan | 4
7 | (Ontario) Jestyn Murphy | 6
3 | (British Columbia) Corryn Brown | 8
6 | (Prince Edward Island) Suzanne Birt | 2

Semifinals
1 | (South Korea) Kim Min-ji | 7
5 | (Manitoba) Beth Peterson | 2
7 | (Ontario) Jestyn Murphy | 8
3 | (British Columbia) Corryn Brown | 5

Final
1 | (South Korea) Kim Min-ji | 9
7 | (Ontario) Jestyn Murphy | 2

===== Quarterfinals =====
Saturday, November 9, 12:30 pm

| Sheet B | 1 | 2 | 3 | 4 | 5 | 6 | 7 | 8 | 9 | Final |
| (Switzerland) Binia Feltscher 🔨 | 0 | 0 | 3 | 1 | 0 | 1 | 1 | 0 | 0 | 6 |
| (Manitoba) Beth Peterson | 1 | 0 | 0 | 0 | 2 | 0 | 0 | 3 | 1 | 7 |

Player percentages
| (Switzerland) Team Feltscher | | (Manitoba) Team Peterson | |
|---|---|---|---|
| Larissa Hari | 84% | Melissa Gordon | 81% |
| Stefanie Berset | 87% | Katherine Doerksen | 82% |
| Carole Howald | 93% | Jenna Loder | 76% |
| Binia Feltscher | 66% | Beth Peterson | 71% |
| Total | 83% | Total | 77% |

| Sheet C | 1 | 2 | 3 | 4 | 5 | 6 | 7 | 8 | Final |
| (British Columbia) Corryn Brown 🔨 | 2 | 0 | 2 | 0 | 0 | 4 | X | X | 8 |
| (Prince Edward Island) Suzanne Birt | 0 | 1 | 0 | 1 | 0 | 0 | X | X | 2 |

Player percentages
| (British Columbia) Team Brown | | (Prince Edward Island) Team Birt | |
|---|---|---|---|
| Ashley Klymchuk | 80% | Michelle McQuaid | 86% |
| Dezaray Hawes | 75% | Meaghan Hughes | 47% |
| Erin Pincott | 86% | Marie Christianson | 77% |
| Corryn Brown | 87% | Suzanne Birt | 62% |
| Total | 82% | Total | 69% |

| Sheet D | 1 | 2 | 3 | 4 | 5 | 6 | 7 | 8 | Final |
| (Ontario) Hollie Duncan 🔨 | 2 | 0 | 0 | 2 | 0 | 0 | 0 | 0 | 4 |
| (Ontario) Jestyn Murphy | 0 | 1 | 1 | 0 | 0 | 2 | 1 | 1 | 6 |

Player percentages
| (Ontario) Team Duncan | | (Ontario) Team Murphy | |
|---|---|---|---|
| Karen Trines | 82% | Grace Holyoke | 83% |
| Cheryl Kreviazuk | 82% | Stephanie Matheson | 62% |
| Laura Hickey | 70% | Carly Howard | 81% |
| Hollie Duncan | 69% | Jestyn Murphy | 79% |
| Total | 76% | Total | 76% |

| Sheet E | 1 | 2 | 3 | 4 | 5 | 6 | 7 | 8 | Final |
| (South Korea) Kim Min-ji 🔨 | 0 | 2 | 0 | 1 | 0 | 0 | 0 | 2 | 5 |
| (Ontario) Megan Balsdon | 0 | 0 | 1 | 0 | 0 | 2 | 1 | 0 | 4 |

Player percentages
| (South Korea) Team Kim | | (Ontario) Team Balsdon | |
|---|---|---|---|
| Kim Su-jin | 91% | Tess Bobbie | 95% |
| Kim Hye-rin | 83% | Rachelle Strybosch | 87% |
| Ha Seung-youn | 90% | Lynn Kreviazuk | 84% |
| Kim Min-ji | 90% | Megan Balsdon | 73% |
| Total | 88% | Total | 85% |

===== Semifinals =====
Saturday, November 9, 8:30 pm

| Sheet B | 1 | 2 | 3 | 4 | 5 | 6 | 7 | 8 | Final |
| (Ontario) Jestyn Murphy | 3 | 0 | 1 | 0 | 2 | 0 | 1 | 1 | 8 |
| (British Columbia) Corryn Brown 🔨 | 0 | 2 | 0 | 1 | 0 | 2 | 0 | 0 | 5 |

Player percentages
| (Ontario) Team Murphy | | (British Columbia) Team Brown | |
|---|---|---|---|
| Grace Holyoke | 71% | Ashley Klymchuk | 83% |
| Stephanie Matheson | 75% | Dezaray Hawes | 71% |
| Carly Howard | 88% | Erin Pincott | 72% |
| Jestyn Murphy | 76% | Corryn Brown | 74% |
| Total | 77% | Total | 75% |

| Sheet C | 1 | 2 | 3 | 4 | 5 | 6 | 7 | 8 | Final |
| (South Korea) Kim Min-ji | 0 | 3 | 0 | 3 | 0 | 1 | X | X | 7 |
| (Manitoba) Beth Peterson 🔨 | 1 | 0 | 1 | 0 | 0 | 0 | X | X | 2 |

Player percentages
| (South Korea) Team Kim | | (Manitoba) Team Peterson | |
|---|---|---|---|
| Kim Su-jin | 80% | Melissa Gordon | 91% |
| Kim Hye-rin | 86% | Katherine Doerksen | 67% |
| Ha Seung-youn | 83% | Jenna Loder | 72% |
| Kim Min-ji | 90% | Beth Peterson | 66% |
| Total | 85% | Total | 74% |

===== Final =====
Sunday, November 10, 12:30 pm

| Sheet A | 1 | 2 | 3 | 4 | 5 | 6 | 7 | 8 | Final |
| (South Korea) Kim Min-ji 🔨 | 2 | 1 | 2 | 4 | 0 | X | X | X | 9 |
| (Ontario) Jestyn Murphy | 0 | 0 | 0 | 0 | 2 | X | X | X | 2 |

Player percentages
| (South Korea) Team Kim | | (Ontario) Team Murphy | |
|---|---|---|---|
| Kim Su-jin | 73% | Grace Holyoke | 83% |
| Kim Hye-rin | 75% | Stephanie Matheson | 76% |
| Ha Seung-youn | 60% | Carly Howard | 66% |
| Kim Min-ji | 70% | Jestyn Murphy | 40% |
| Total | 69% | Total | 66% |
