= 2020 Ontario Scotties Tournament of Hearts =

- Host city: Cornwall, Ontario
- Arena: Ed Lumley Arena
- Dates: January 27 – February 1
- Winner: Team Homan
- Curling club: Ottawa Curling Club, Ottawa
- Skip: Rachel Homan
- Third: Emma Miskew
- Second: Joanne Courtney
- Lead: Lisa Weagle
- Coach: Marcel Rocque
- Finalist: Hollie Duncan

The 2020 Ontario Scotties Tournament of Hearts, the provincial women's curling championship for Southern Ontario, was held from January 27 to February 1 at the Ed Lumley Arena in Cornwall, Ontario. The winning Rachel Homan rink represented Ontario at the 2020 Scotties Tournament of Hearts in Moose Jaw, Saskatchewan and lost the gold medal final to Manitoba. The event was held in conjunction with the 2020 Ontario Tankard, the men's provincial championship.

Rachel Homan's rink from the Ottawa Curling Club completed their perfect undefeated run when they defeated Hollie Duncan's rink from the Royal Canadian Curling Club 7–6. It was Homan's 5th provincial title.

== Qualification process ==
Nine teams will qualify from two cash spiels (two each), an open qualifier (two teams), plus the top three southern Ontario teams in the CTRS standings (as of December 1, 2019). Originally the event was to have just eight teams, but CurlON decided on December 9, 2019 to expand the field to nine teams with the addition of one team qualifying through their CTRS ranking.

Qualification method	Berths	Qualifying team
CTRS leaders	3	Rachel Homan; Jestyn Murphy; Megan Balsdon
Cash Spiel #1	2	Hollie Duncan; Susan Froud
Cash Spiel #2	2	Danielle Inglis; Jacqueline Harrison
Open Qualifier	2	Julie Hastings; Chelsea Brandwood

== Teams ==
The team lineups are as follows:

Skip	Third	Second	Lead	Club(s)
Megan Balsdon	Lynn Kreviazuk	Rachelle Strybosch	Tess Bobbie	Woodstock Curling Club, Woodstock
Chelsea Brandwood	Brenda Holloway	Riley Sandham	Hilary Nuhn	St. Catharines Golf & Country Club, St. Catharines
Hollie Duncan	Laura Hickey	Cheryl Kreviazuk	Karen Trines	Royal Canadian Curling Club, Toronto
Susan Froud	Kristina Brauch	Jessica Humphries	Karen Rowsell	Alliston Curling Club, Alliston
Jacqueline Harrison	Chantal Duhaime	Marcia Richardson	Jillian Page	Dundas Valley Curling Club, Dundas, Hamilton
Julie Hastings	Christy Trombley	Stacey Smith	Katrina Sale	Bayview Country Club, Thornhill
Rachel Homan	Emma Miskew	Joanne Courtney	Lisa Weagle	Ottawa Curling Club, Ottawa
Danielle Inglis	Jessica Corrado	Stephanie Corrado	Cassandra de Groot	Dixie Curling Club, Mississauga
Jestyn Murphy	Janet Murphy	Stephanie Matheson	Grace Holyoke	Mississaugua Golf & Country Club, Mississauga

== Round-robin standings ==
Final round-robin standings

Key
Teams to Playoffs
Teams to Tiebreaker

Skip (Club)	W	L	PF	PA	Ends Won	Ends Lost	Blank Ends	Stolen Ends
Rachel Homan (Ottawa)	8	0	69	33	40	23	5	15
Danielle Inglis (Dixie)	7	1	67	44	37	26	5	14
Hollie Duncan (Royals)	5	3	57	47	33	32	5	12
Jestyn Murphy (Mississaugua)	5	3	61	44	33	32	7	8
Susan Froud (Alliston)	3	5	47	63	35	33	1	11
Megan Balsdon (Woodstock)	3	5	53	57	30	37	8	9
Julie Hastings (Bayview)	2	6	37	69	23	35	6	2
Jacqueline Harrison (Dundas Valley)	2	6	55	66	34	35	8	11
Chelsea Brandwood (St. Catharines)	1	7	44	66	29	40	4	9

== Round-robin results ==
All draws are listed in Eastern Time (UTC−05:00).

=== Draw 1 ===
Monday, January 27, 1:00 pm

Sheet A	1	2	3	4	5	6	7	8	9	10	Final
Julie Hastings 🔨	0	0	2	0	0	0	1	0	X	X	3
Chelsea Brandwood	0	1	0	3	0	1	0	4	X	X	9

Sheet B	1	2	3	4	5	6	7	8	9	10	Final
Rachel Homan 🔨	2	2	0	1	0	1	2	0	X	X	8
Susan Froud	0	0	2	0	1	0	0	1	X	X	4

Sheet C	1	2	3	4	5	6	7	8	9	10	Final
Hollie Duncan 🔨	0	0	2	2	1	0	0	1	0	2	8
Jacqueline Harrison	0	2	0	0	0	2	1	0	1	0	6

Sheet D	1	2	3	4	5	6	7	8	9	10	Final
Danielle Inglis	0	0	0	1	0	1	1	2	0	1	6
Jestyn Murphy 🔨	0	0	2	0	1	0	0	0	2	0	5

=== Draw 2 ===
Tuesday, January 28, 8:30 am

Sheet A	1	2	3	4	5	6	7	8	9	10	Final
Jestyn Murphy 🔨	1	0	2	0	0	2	0	1	0	0	6
Hollie Duncan	0	1	0	2	1	0	1	0	0	2	7

Sheet B	1	2	3	4	5	6	7	8	9	10	Final
Jacqueline Harrison 🔨	0	2	2	0	1	0	1	0	0	0	6
Megan Balsdon	0	0	0	3	0	2	0	0	1	1	7

Sheet C	1	2	3	4	5	6	7	8	9	10	Final
Julie Hastings 🔨	1	0	2	0	0	0	2	0	X	X	5
Danielle Inglis	0	1	0	2	2	4	0	3	X	X	12

Sheet D	1	2	3	4	5	6	7	8	9	10	Final
Chelsea Brandwood	1	1	0	1	0	0	1	0	1	0	5
Rachel Homan 🔨	0	0	1	0	2	1	0	3	0	1	8

=== Draw 3 ===
Tuesday, January 28, 4:00 pm

Sheet A	1	2	3	4	5	6	7	8	9	10	Final
Danielle Inglis	0	1	0	2	0	0	0	X	X	X	3
Rachel Homan 🔨	0	0	1	0	3	5	1	X	X	X	10

Sheet B	1	2	3	4	5	6	7	8	9	10	Final
Julie Hastings	0	1	0	0	0	X	X	X	X	X	1
Hollie Duncan 🔨	1	0	4	2	2	X	X	X	X	X	9

Sheet C	1	2	3	4	5	6	7	8	9	10	Final
Chelsea Brandwood	1	0	0	0	0	1	0	3	0	0	5
Susan Froud 🔨	0	1	1	1	1	0	1	0	1	1	7

Sheet D	1	2	3	4	5	6	7	8	9	10	Final
Jestyn Murphy 🔨	0	2	2	2	1	0	2	X	X	X	9
Megan Balsdon	0	0	0	0	0	2	0	X	X	X	2

=== Draw 4 ===
Wednesday, January 29, 12:15 pm

Sheet A	1	2	3	4	5	6	7	8	9	10	Final
Hollie Duncan 🔨	0	3	0	1	0	0	0	1	1	0	6
Megan Balsdon	2	0	2	0	0	1	0	0	0	2	7

Sheet B	1	2	3	4	5	6	7	8	9	10	Final
Chelsea Brandwood 🔨	1	0	0	1	0	2	1	0	1	X	6
Jestyn Murphy	0	3	1	0	4	0	0	2	0	X	10

Sheet C	1	2	3	4	5	6	7	8	9	10	11	Final
Danielle Inglis 🔨	2	0	1	0	0	3	0	1	0	1	2	10
Jacqueline Harrison	0	2	0	0	1	0	1	0	4	0	0	8

Sheet D	1	2	3	4	5	6	7	8	9	10	Final
Julie Hastings 🔨	1	0	1	0	0	0	0	1	0	X	3
Susan Froud	0	2	0	2	1	1	1	0	1	X	8

=== Draw 5 ===
Wednesday, January 29, 7:45 pm

Sheet A	1	2	3	4	5	6	7	8	9	10	Final
Julie Hastings 🔨	0	0	1	0	0	1	0	X	X	X	2
Rachel Homan	0	3	0	1	1	0	4	X	X	X	9

Sheet B	1	2	3	4	5	6	7	8	9	10	Final
Danielle Inglis 🔨	1	2	0	0	2	0	1	1	0	0	7
Megan Balsdon	0	0	1	1	0	2	0	0	1	1	6

Sheet C	1	2	3	4	5	6	7	8	9	10	Final
Jestyn Murphy	0	1	0	1	2	0	1	0	2	X	7
Susan Froud 🔨	1	0	1	0	0	1	0	1	0	X	4

Sheet D	1	2	3	4	5	6	7	8	9	10	Final
Chelsea Brandwood 🔨	0	1	0	1	0	4	0	1	0	0	7
Jacqueline Harrison	0	0	1	0	2	0	4	0	2	1	10

=== Draw 6 ===
Thursday, January 30, 8:30 am

Sheet A	1	2	3	4	5	6	7	8	9	10	Final
Chelsea Brandwood	0	2	0	1	0	0	0	X	X	X	3
Danielle Inglis 🔨	1	0	3	0	2	1	2	X	X	X	9

Sheet B	1	2	3	4	5	6	7	8	9	10	Final
Julie Hastings	0	3	1	0	0	1	0	0	6	X	11
Jacqueline Harrison 🔨	2	0	0	0	1	0	1	2	0	X	6

Sheet C	1	2	3	4	5	6	7	8	9	10	Final
Rachel Homan 🔨	1	1	0	1	2	0	1	0	0	1	7
Megan Balsdon	0	0	3	0	0	1	0	1	0	0	5

Sheet D	1	2	3	4	5	6	7	8	9	10	Final
Hollie Duncan 🔨	2	5	0	0	2	0	1	X	X	X	10
Susan Froud	0	0	1	2	0	1	0	X	X	X	4

=== Draw 7 ===
Thursday, January 30, 4:00 pm

Sheet A	1	2	3	4	5	6	7	8	9	10	Final
Susan Froud 🔨	2	0	4	0	0	2	0	1	1	1	11
Megan Balsdon	0	2	0	2	2	0	4	0	0	0	10

Sheet B	1	2	3	4	5	6	7	8	9	10	Final
Chelsea Brandwood	0	0	0	0	0	4	1	1	0	0	6
Hollie Duncan 🔨	2	0	1	1	1	0	0	0	2	2	9

Sheet C	1	2	3	4	5	6	7	8	9	10	Final
Julie Hastings	0	1	0	2	0	0	1	0	X	X	4
Jestyn Murphy 🔨	2	0	2	0	3	1	0	2	X	X	10

Sheet D	1	2	3	4	5	6	7	8	9	10	Final
Rachel Homan 🔨	0	1	0	1	3	0	2	2	X	X	9
Jacqueline Harrison	0	0	2	0	0	2	0	0	X	X	4

=== Draw 8 ===
Friday, January 31, 8:30 am

Sheet A	1	2	3	4	5	6	7	8	9	10	Final
Jestyn Murphy 🔨	0	0	4	2	0	0	0	0	0	1	7
Jacqueline Harrison	0	2	0	0	1	1	1	1	0	0	6

Sheet B	1	2	3	4	5	6	7	8	9	10	Final
Danielle Inglis 🔨	2	0	7	0	0	2	X	X	X	X	11
Susan Froud	0	1	0	0	1	0	X	X	X	X	2

Sheet C	1	2	3	4	5	6	7	8	9	10	Final
Hollie Duncan	0	0	2	0	1	0	0	0	0	X	3
Rachel Homan 🔨	1	1	0	1	0	2	2	1	1	X	9

Sheet D	1	2	3	4	5	6	7	8	9	10	Final
Julie Hastings 🔨	2	0	0	1	1	0	0	1	0	3	8
Megan Balsdon	0	3	0	0	0	1	0	0	2	0	6

=== Draw 9 ===
Friday, January 31, 4:00 pm

Sheet A	1	2	3	4	5	6	7	8	9	10	Final
Jacqueline Harrison 🔨	1	0	2	0	0	1	0	3	1	1	9
Susan Froud	0	2	0	1	1	0	3	0	0	0	7

Sheet B	1	2	3	4	5	6	7	8	9	10	Final
Jestyn Murphy	0	0	2	0	2	0	2	0	1	0	7
Rachel Homan 🔨	0	4	0	3	0	0	0	1	0	1	9

Sheet C	1	2	3	4	5	6	7	8	9	10	Final
Chelsea Brandwood	0	0	0	0	1	2	0	0	X	X	3
Megan Balsdon 🔨	1	1	3	2	0	0	1	2	X	X	10

Sheet D	1	2	3	4	5	6	7	8	9	10	Final
Danielle Inglis	0	0	2	2	1	0	1	2	1	X	9
Hollie Duncan 🔨	2	2	0	0	0	1	0	0	0	X	5

=== Tiebreaker ===
Saturday, February 1, 8:00 am

Sheet C	1	2	3	4	5	6	7	8	9	10	Final
Hollie Duncan 🔨	3	0	1	2	1	0	3	0	X	X	10
Jestyn Murphy	0	1	0	0	0	1	0	0	X	X	2

== Playoffs ==
Semifinal			Final
			1	Rachel Homan	7
2	Danielle Inglis	5	3	Hollie Duncan	6
3	Hollie Duncan	6

=== Semifinal ===
Saturday, February 1, 1:00 pm

Sheet B	1	2	3	4	5	6	7	8	9	10	Final
Danielle Inglis 🔨	2	0	1	0	1	0	0	1	0	0	5
Hollie Duncan	0	1	0	1	0	1	2	0	0	1	6

=== Final ===
Saturday, February 1, 8:00 pm

Sheet B	1	2	3	4	5	6	7	8	9	10	Final
Rachel Homan 🔨	0	1	0	2	1	0	0	3	0	0	7
Hollie Duncan	1	0	1	0	0	1	1	0	1	1	6

2020 Ontario Scotties Tournament of Hearts

Rachel Homan
5th Ontario Provincial Championship title

== Qualification ==
=== Cash Spiel #1 ===
December 20–22, Guelph Curling Club, Guelph

A1 Event		Semifinals		To Playoff
		Hollie Duncan (Royals)	9
Susan Froud (Alliston)	7	Susan Froud (Alliston)	5
Chelsea Brandwood (St. Catharines)	5			Hollie Duncan (Royals)	6
Cathy Auld (Thornhill)	9			Lauren Horton (Westmount)	5
Breanna Rozon (Bayview)	1	Cathy Auld (Thornhill)	4
Madelyn Warriner (Listowel)	4	Lauren Horton (Westmount)	8
Lauren Horton (Westmount)	5

A2 Event
Danielle Inglis (Dixie)	6
Rachel Steele (Port Perry)	4
Heather Heggestad (Thornhill)	10
Jacqueline Harrison (Dundas Valley)	2
Katelyn Wasylkiw (Bayview)	6
Chrissy Cadorin (St. Thomas)	5
Kaitlyn Jones (Galt)	5
Mackenzie Kiemele (Leaside)	3

Semifinals
Danielle Inglis (Dixie)	5
Heather Heggestad (Thornhill)	6
Katelyn Wasylkiw (Bayview)	7
Kaitlyn Jones (Galt)	6

To Playoff
Heather Heggestad (Thornhill)	6
Katelyn Wasylkiw (Bayview)	5

B1 Event		Semifinals		To Playoff
		Chelsea Brandwood (St. Catharines)	4
Breanna Rozon (Bayview)	8	Breanna Rozon (Bayview)	7
Madelyn Warriner (Listowel)	5			Breanna Rozon (Bayview)	2
				Katelyn Wasylkiw (Bayview)	7

B2 Event		Semifinals		To Playoff
Rachel Steele (Port Perry)	4
Jacqueline Harrison (Dundas Valley)	5	Jacqueline Harrison (Dundas Valley)	8
Chrissy Cadorin (St. Thomas)	7	Chrissy Cadorin (St. Thomas)	5
Mackenzie Kiemele (Leaside)	6			Jacqueline Harrison (Dundas Valley)	8
				Lauren Horton (Westmount)	1

B3 Event
Susan Froud (Alliston)	8
Cathy Auld (Thornhill)	6
Danielle Inglis (Dixie)	1
Kaitlyn Jones (Galt)	5

To Playoff
Susan Froud (Alliston)	9
Kaitlyn Jones (Galt)	10

C1 Event		To Playoff
Rachel Steele (Port Perry)	4
Danielle Inglis (Dixie)	9	Danielle Inglis (Dixie)	10
		Lauren Horton (Westmount)	2

C2 Event		Semifinals		To Playoff
Madelyn Warriner (Listowel)	1
Mackenzie Kiemele (Leaside)	6	Mackenzie Kiemele (Leaside)	2
		Cathy Auld (Thornhill)	6
				Cathy Auld (Thornhill)
				Breanna Rozon (Bayview)	WO

C3 Event		To Playoff
Chelsea Brandwood (St. Catharines)	6
Chrissy Cadorin (St. Thomas)	2	Chelsea Brandwood (St. Catharines)	2
		Susan Froud (Alliston)	9

Playoff Round
A1	Hollie Duncan (Royals)	8
C2	Breanna Rozon (Bayview)	3
B2	Jacqueline Harrison (Dundas Valley)	5
B3	Kaitlyn Jones (Galt)	4

To Provincials
A1	Hollie Duncan (Royals)	6
B2	Jacqueline Harrison (Dundas Valley)	1

Playoff Round
A2	Heather Heggestad (Thornhill)	3
C1	Danielle Inglis (Dixie)	6
B1	Katelyn Wasylkiw (Bayview)	6
C3	Susan Froud (Alliston)	7

To Provincials
C1	Danielle Inglis (Dixie)	5
C3	Susan Froud (Alliston)	6

=== Cash Spiel #2 ===
January 10–12, 2020, West Northumberland Curling Club, Coburg

A1 Event		Semifinals		To Playoff
		Lauren Horton (Westmount)	3
Chrissy Cadorin (St. Thomas)	4	Heather Heggestad (Thornhill)	4
Heather Heggestad (Thornhill)	6			Heather Heggestad (Thornhill)	3
Cathy Auld (Thornhill)	8			Cathy Auld (Thornhill)	7
Breanna Rozon (Bayview)	3	Cathy Auld (Thornhill)	9
Jacqueline Harrison (Dundas Valley)	6	Jacqueline Harrison (Dundas Valley)	3
Kristen Marshall (KW Granite)	5

A2 Event
Danielle Inglis (Thornhill)	3
Mackenzie Kiemele (Leaside)	5
Katelyn Wasylkiw (Unionville)	5
Sherry Middaugh (Thornhill)	6
Chelsea Brandwood (St. Catharines)	2
Marie-Elaine Little (Ottawa Hunt)	7
Kaitlyn Jones (Galt)	6
Rebecca Wichers-Schreur (Rideau)	8

Semifinals
Mackenzie Kiemele (Leaside)	5
Sherry Middaugh (Thornhill)	7
Marie-Elaine Little (Ottawa Hunt)	7
Rebecca Wichers-Schreur (Rideau)	5

To Playoff
Sherry Middaugh (Thornhill)	5
Rebecca Wichers-Schreur (Rideau)	2

B1 Event		Semifinals		To Playoff
		Chrissy Cadorin (St. Thomas)	2
Breanna Rozon (Bayview)	2	Kristen Marshall (KW Granite)	8
Kristen Marshall (KW Granite)	9			Marie-Elaine Little (Ottawa Hunt)	3
				Kristen Marshall (KW Granite)	8

B2 Event		Semifinals		To Playoff
Katelyn Wasylkiw (Unionville)	0
Danielle Inglis (Thornhill)	12	Danielle Inglis (Thornhill)	5
Chelsea Brandwood (St. Catharines)	6	Chelsea Brandwood (St. Catharines)	6
Kaitlyn Jones (Galt)	4			Chelsea Brandwood (St. Catharines)	4
				Heather Heggestad (Thornhill)	5

B3 Event
Lauren Horton (Westmount)	5
Jacqueline Harrison (Dundas Valley)	4
Mackenzie Kiemele (Leaside)	3
Rebecca Wichers-Schreur (Rideau)	4

To Playoff
Lauren Horton (Westmount)	6
Rebecca Wichers-Schreur (Rideau)	3

C1 Event		To Playoff
Katelyn Wasylkiw (Unionville)	6
Mackenzie Kiemele (Leaside)	1	Chelsea Brandwood (St. Catharines)	2
		Katelyn Wasylkiw (Unionville)	5

C2 Event		To Playoff
Danielle Inglis (Thornhill)	8
Chrissy Cadorin (St. Thomas)	1	Rebecca Wichers-Schreur (Rideau)	5
		Danielle Inglis (Thornhill)	9

C3 Event		Semifinals		To Playoff
Kaitlyn Jones (Galt)	7
Breanna Rozon (Bayview)	3	Jacqueline Harrison (Dundas Valley)	9
		Kaitlyn Jones (Galt)	6
				Jacqueline Harrison (Dundas Valley)	6
				Marie-Elaine Little (Ottawa Hunt)	3

Playoff Round
A1	Cathy Auld (Thornhill)	5
C3	Jacqueline Harrison (Dundas Valley)	8
B2	Heather Heggestad (Thornhill)	1
B3	Lauren Horton (Westmount)	7

To Provincials
C3	Jacqueline Harrison (Dundas Valley)	7
B3	Lauren Horton (Westmount)	4

Playoff Round
B1	Kristen Marshall (KW Granite)	2
C2	Danielle Inglis (Thornhill)	8
C1	Katelyn Wasylkiw (Unionville)	5
A2	Sherry Middaugh (Thornhill)	2

To Provincials
C2	Danielle Inglis (Thornhill)	7
C1	Katelyn Wasylkiw (Unionville)	2

=== Open qualifier ===
January 17–19, 2020, Bayview Golf & Country Club, Thornhill

A Side
Colleen Madonia (Thornhill)	6
Chrissy Cadorin (St. Thomas)	5
Morgan Typhair (Oshawa)	2
Julie Hastings (Bayview)	8
Breanna Rozon (Bayview)	10
Kirsten Marshall (KW Granite)	2

Quarterfinals
Kaitlyn Jones (Galt)	7
Colleen Madonia (Thornhill)	8
Cathy Auld (Thornhill)	7
Julie Hastings (Bayview)	9
Lauren Horton (Westmount)	6
Breanna Rozon (Bayview)	9
Katelyn Wasylkiw (Bayview)	6
Chelsea Brandwood (St. Catharines)	7

Semifinals
Colleen Madonia (Thornhill)	8
Julie Hastings (Bayview)	9
Breanna Rozon (Bayview)	2
Chelsea Brandwood (St. Catharines)	6

To Provincials
Julie Hastings (Bayview)	11
Chelsea Brandwood (St. Catharines)	2

B Side
Kirsten Marshall (KW Granite)	8
Chrissy Cadorin (St. Thomas)	10
Morgan Typhair (Oshawa)	2
Lauren Horton (Westmount)	9
Kaitlyn Jones (Galt)	8
Katelyn Wasylkiw (Bayview)	7

Round of 16
Chrissy Cadorin (St. Thomas)	7
Lauren Horton (Westmount)	4
Cathy Auld (Thornhill)	4
Kaitlyn Jones (Galt)	12

Quarterfinals
Breanna Rozon (Bayview)	8
Chrissy Cadorin (St. Thomas)	5
Colleen Madonia (Thornhill)	10
Kaitlyn Jones (Galt)	7

Semifinals
Breanna Rozon (Bayview)	2
Colleen Madonia (Thornhill)	10

To Provincials
Chelsea Brandwood (St. Catharines)	7
Colleen Madonia (Thornhill)	2
