= 2019 Ontario Scotties Tournament of Hearts =

- Host city: Elmira, Ontario
- Arena: Woolwich Memorial Centre
- Dates: January 28–February 2
- Winner: Team Homan
- Curling club: Ottawa Curling Club
- Skip: Rachel Homan
- Third: Emma Miskew
- Second: Joanne Courtney
- Lead: Lisa Weagle
- Coach: Marcel Rocque
- Finalist: Julie Tippin

The 2019 Ontario Scotties Tournament of Hearts, the provincial women's curling championship for Southern Ontario, was held January 28 to February 2 at the Woolwich Memorial Centre in Elmira, Ontario. The winning team of skip Rachel Homan, third Emma Miskew, second Joanne Courtney and lead Lisa Weagle represented Ontario at the 2019 Scotties Tournament of Hearts in Sydney, Nova Scotia, finishing second. Homan defeated Julie Tippin in the final with a final score of 7-5. The event was held in conjunction with the 2019 Ontario Tankard, the men's provincial championship. This was the sixth time the team played at the Scotties and the fourth time representing Ontario.

Unlike the 2018 event, the 2019 Scotties returned to having a round robin format.

== Qualification process ==
Eight teams qualified from two cash spiels (two each), an open qualifier (two teams), plus the top two southern Ontario teams in the CTRS standings (as of December 9, 2018).

Qualification method	Berths	Qualifying team
CTRS leaders	2	Rachel Homan; Jacqueline Harrison
Cash Spiel #1	2	Susan Froud; Julie Tippin
Cash Spiel #2	2	Hollie Duncan; Jestyn Murphy
Open Qualifier	2	Cathy Auld; Chelsea Brandwood

== Teams ==
The team lineups were as follows:

Skip	Third	Second	Lead	Alternate	Club(s)
Cathy Auld	Erin Morrissey	Karen Rowsell	Jennifer Ahde		Cataraqui Golf & Country Club, Kingston
Chelsea Brandwood	Brenda Holloway	Riley Sandham	Hilary Nuhn	Jillian Paige	Listowel Curling Club, Listowel
Hollie Duncan	Laura Hickey	Cheryl Kreviazuk	Karen Sagle		Royal Canadian Curling Club, Toronto
Jacqueline Harrison	Clancy Grandy	Lynn Kreviazuk	Morgan Court		Ottawa Hunt & Golf Club, Ottawa
Rachel Homan	Emma Miskew	Joanne Courtney	Lisa Weagle		Ottawa Curling Club, Ottawa
Lauren Horton	Susan Froud	Margot Flemming	Megan Arnold		Westmount Golf & Country Club, Kitchener
Jestyn Murphy	Janet Murphy	Stephanie Matheson	Grace Holyoke		Mississaugua Golf & Country Club, Mississauga
Julie Tippin	Megan Balsdon	Rachelle Strybosch	Tess Bobbie		Woodstock Curling Centre, Woodstock

== Round robin standings ==
Key
Teams to playoffs
Teams to tiebreaker

Skip (Club)	W	L	PF	PA	Ends Won	Ends Lost	Blank Ends	Stolen Ends
Rachel Homan (Ottawa)	6	1	53	28	30	19	7	14
Jestyn Murphy (Mississaugua)	5	2	49	37	35	27	5	12
Hollie Duncan (Royals)	4	3	43	53	29	30	3	11
Julie Tippin (Woodstock)	4	3	42	40	26	28	4	10
Cathy Auld (Cataraqui)	3	4	39	51	26	27	2	8
Jacqueline Harrison (Ottawa Hunt)	3	4	46	39	31	26	9	13
Lauren Horton (Westmount)	2	5	34	43	24	33	3	6
Chelsea Brandwood (Listowel)	1	6	40	55	25	36	4	3

== Round robin results ==
=== Draw 4 ===
January 28, 8:00 pm

Sheet A	1	2	3	4	5	6	7	8	9	10	Final
Rachel Homan 🔨	1	0	2	0	1	0	0	1	0	3	8
Chelsea Brandwood	0	2	0	1	0	2	0	0	2	0	7

Sheet B	1	2	3	4	5	6	7	8	9	10	Final
Cathy Auld	1	0	2	0	0	3	1	1	0	0	8
Hollie Duncan 🔨	0	2	0	1	2	0	0	0	2	2	9

Sheet C	1	2	3	4	5	6	7	8	9	10	Final
Julie Tippin 🔨	1	0	1	1	0	1	1	3	0	X	8
Lauren Horton	0	2	0	0	1	0	0	0	2	X	5

Sheet D	1	2	3	4	5	6	7	8	9	10	Final
Jestyn Murphy 🔨	0	0	0	3	0	0	2	1	0	X	6
Jacqueline Harrison	0	0	1	0	0	2	0	0	0	X	3

=== Draw 5 ===
January 29, 9:30 am

Sheet A	1	2	3	4	5	6	7	8	9	10	11	Final
Hollie Duncan 🔨	1	0	2	0	2	1	1	0	0	0	1	8
Jestyn Murphy	0	2	0	2	0	0	0	1	1	1	0	7

Sheet B	1	2	3	4	5	6	7	8	9	10	Final
Rachel Homan 🔨	2	0	0	3	1	2	X	X	X	X	8
Lauren Horton	0	1	0	0	0	0	X	X	X	X	1

Sheet C	1	2	3	4	5	6	7	8	9	10	Final
Chelsea Brandwood	0	0	0	0	1	2	0	0	2	0	5
Jacqueline Harrison 🔨	2	0	1	1	0	0	1	1	0	1	7

Sheet D	1	2	3	4	5	6	7	8	9	10	Final
Cathy Auld🔨	1	1	0	1	1	0	2	0	3	X	9
Julie Tippin	0	0	1	0	0	2	0	1	0	X	4

=== Draw 7 ===
January 29, 7:30 pm

Sheet C	1	2	3	4	5	6	7	8	9	10	Final
Lauren Horton 🔨	2	0	1	0	0	2	1	0	2	X	8
Cathy Auld	0	1	0	1	1	0	0	1	0	X	4

Sheet B	1	2	3	4	5	6	7	8	9	10	11	Final
Chelsea Brandwood 🔨	1	0	2	0	1	0	1	0	2	0	0	7
Jestyn Murphy	0	2	0	1	0	1	0	1	0	2	1	8

=== Draw 8 ===
January 30, 9:30 am

Sheet C	1	2	3	4	5	6	7	8	9	10	Final
Rachel Homan 🔨	0	1	2	0	1	2	0	1	X	X	7
Julie Tippin	0	0	0	0	0	0	1	0	X	X	1

Sheet D	1	2	3	4	5	6	7	8	9	10	11	Final
Hollie Duncan 🔨	1	1	0	0	1	0	0	2	0	0	1	6
Jacqueline Harrison	0	0	1	2	0	0	1	0	0	1	0	5

=== Draw 9 ===
January 30, 2:30 pm

Sheet C	1	2	3	4	5	6	7	8	9	10	Final
Cathy Auld	1	0	1	2	0	0	2	0	1	X	7
Jestyn Murphy 🔨	0	1	0	0	2	1	0	1	0	X	5

Sheet D	1	2	3	4	5	6	7	8	9	10	Final
Chelsea Brandwood	1	0	0	0	1	0	0	0	X	X	2
Lauren Horton 🔨	0	1	0	1	0	2	2	1	X	X	7

=== Draw 10 ===
January 30, 7:30 pm

Sheet A	1	2	3	4	5	6	7	8	9	10	Final
Hollie Duncan	0	0	0	0	0	X	X	X	X	X	0
Julie Tippin 🔨	4	2	1	0	1	X	X	X	X	X	8

Sheet B	1	2	3	4	5	6	7	8	9	10	11	Final
Rachel Homan	0	0	1	2	0	0	0	2	1	0	1	7
Jacqueline Harrison 🔨	1	1	0	0	0	2	1	0	0	1	0	6

=== Draw 11 ===
January 31, 9:30 am

Sheet C	1	2	3	4	5	6	7	8	9	10	Final
Chelsea Brandwood 🔨	0	3	0	2	0	1	0	4	0	1	11
Hollie Duncan	1	0	2	0	2	0	2	0	2	0	9

Sheet D	1	2	3	4	5	6	7	8	9	10	Final
Rachel Homan	3	4	0	0	2	X	X	X	X	X	9
Cathy Auld 🔨	0	0	0	2	0	X	X	X	X	X	2

=== Draw 12 ===
January 31, 2:30 pm

Sheet A	1	2	3	4	5	6	7	8	9	10	Final
Lauren Horton 🔨	0	0	2	1	1	0	1	0	1	0	6
Jacqueline Harrison	1	1	0	0	0	2	0	2	0	1	7

Sheet B	1	2	3	4	5	6	7	8	9	10	Final
Julie Tippin	0	1	0	3	0	0	0	1	0	X	5
Jestyn Murphy 🔨	2	0	2	0	1	1	1	0	2	X	9

=== Draw 13 ===
January 31, 7:30 pm

Sheet A	1	2	3	4	5	6	7	8	9	10	Final
Rachel Homan	0	0	1	2	0	0	0	1	0	X	4
Jestyn Murphy 🔨	0	1	0	0	2	2	2	0	1	X	8

Sheet B	1	2	3	4	5	6	7	8	9	10	Final
Hollie Duncan	0	1	0	1	1	1	0	3	1	X	8
Lauren Horton 🔨	0	0	2	0	0	0	2	0	0	X	4

=== Draw 14 ===
February 1, 9:30 am

Sheet C	1	2	3	4	5	6	7	8	9	10	Final
Cathy Auld	0	0	0	1	0	X	X	X	X	X	1
Jacqueline Harrison 🔨	1	3	2	0	5	X	X	X	X	X	11

Sheet D	1	2	3	4	5	6	7	8	9	10	Final
Chelsea Brandwood	1	0	0	1	0	1	0	0	0	0	3
Julie Tippin 🔨	0	1	0	0	1	0	0	2	1	3	8

=== Draw 15 ===
February 1, 2:30 pm

Sheet A	1	2	3	4	5	6	7	8	9	10	Final
Chelsea Brandwood	0	0	1	0	2	0	0	2	0	X	5
Cathy Auld 🔨	3	0	0	3	0	0	1	0	1	X	8

Sheet B	1	2	3	4	5	6	7	8	9	10	Final
Julie Tippin	0	3	1	0	0	0	2	0	2	0	8
Jacqueline Harrison 🔨	0	0	0	2	1	1	0	2	0	1	7

Sheet C	1	2	3	4	5	6	7	8	9	10	Final
Rachel Homan	3	1	0	0	0	0	2	1	3	X	10
Hollie Duncan 🔨	0	0	2	0	0	1	0	0	0	X	3

Sheet D	1	2	3	4	5	6	7	8	9	10	Final
Lauren Horton	0	1	0	0	0	0	1	0	1	X	3
Jestyn Murphy 🔨	1	0	1	1	1	1	0	1	0	X	6

=== Tiebreaker ===
February 1, 7:30 pm

Sheet E	1	2	3	4	5	6	7	8	9	10	Final
Hollie Duncan 🔨	0	0	1	0	2	0	2	0	0	X	5
Julie Tippin	1	2	0	2	0	2	0	2	1	X	10

== Playoffs ==
Semifinal			Final
			1	Rachel Homan	6
2	Jestyn Murphy	4	3	Julie Tippin	4
3	Julie Tippin	11

=== Semifinal ===
February 2, 9:30 am

Sheet C	1	2	3	4	5	6	7	8	9	10	Final
Jestyn Murphy 🔨	2	0	1	0	1	0	0	0	X	X	4
Julie Tippin	0	3	0	2	0	1	1	4	X	X	11

=== Final ===
February 2, 7:00 pm

Sheet C	1	2	3	4	5	6	7	8	9	10	Final
Rachel Homan 🔨	1	0	1	0	1	0	2	0	0	1	6
Julie Tippin	0	0	0	1	0	2	0	0	1	0	4

2019 Ontario Scotties Tournament of Hearts

Rachel Homan
4th Ontario Provincial Championship title

== Qualification ==
=== Cash Spiel #1 ===
December 14–16, Midland Curling Club, Midland

Key
Teams to Playoffs
Teams to Tiebreakers

Pool A	W	L
Julie Tippin (Woodstock)	4	0
Chrissy Cadorin (Royals)	2	2
Cathy Auld (Cataraqui)	2	2
Heather Heggestad (Oakvlle)	1	3
Ashley Waye (Royals)	1	3

Pool B	W	L
Jestyn Murphy (Mississaugua)	4	0
Susan Froud (Westmount)	3	1
Jo-Ann Rizzo (Brantford)	1	3
Julie Hastings (Bayview)	1	3
Marteen Jones (Ennismore)	1	3

Pool C	W	L
Hollie Duncan (Royals)	4	0
Danielle Inglis (Thornhill)	3	1
Jaclyn Peters (RCMP)	1	3
Katelyn Wasylkiw (Unionville)	1	3
Erica Hopson (Rideau)	1	3

Tiebreaker

- Wasylkiw 7, Peters 5

Quarterfinals
Murphy	8
Wasylkiw	9
Inglis	7
Froud	8
Duncan	8
Cadorin	4
Tippin	6
Auld	5

Semifinals
Wasylkiw	4
Froud	6
Duncan	2
Tippin	5

Final
Froud	4
Tippin	3

=== Cash Spiel #2 ===
January 4–6, 2019, Leaside Curling Club, East York, Toronto

A1 Event
Hollie Duncan (Royals)	8
Kaitlin Jewer (Lindsay)	7
Heather Heggestad (Oakville)	4
Jo-Ann Rizzo (Brantford)	7
Chrissy Cadorin (Royals)	7
Hailey Armstrong (Rideau)	3
Sherry Middaugh (Thornhill)	1
Danielle Inglis (Dixie)	7

Semifinals
Hollie Duncan	5
Jo-Ann Rizzo	2
Chrissy Cadorin	4
Danielle Inglis	6

To playoff
Hollie Duncan	7
Danielle Inglis	4

A2 Event
Cathy Auld (Cataraqui)	9
Kirsten Marshall (London)	3
Jaimee Gardner (Dundas Valley)	6
Chelsea Brandwood (Listowel)	8
Katelyn Wasylkiw (Unionville)	4
Erica Hopson (Rideau)	7
Ashley Waye (Royals)	3
Jestyn Murphy (Mississaugua)	8

Semifinals
Cathy Auld	9
Chelsea Brandwood	3
Erica Hopson	4
Jestyn Murphy	6

To playoff
Cathy Auld	3
Jestyn Murphy	6

B1 event
Kaitlin Jewer	8
Heather Heggestad	4
Hailey Armstrong	5
Sherry Middaugh	6

Quarterfinals
Erica Hopson	1
Kaitlin Jewer	6
Chelsea Brandwood	8
Sherry Middaugh	3

Semifinals
Kaitlin Jewer	3
Chelsea Brandwood	6

To playoff
Chelsea Brandwood	4
Danielle Inglis	8

B2 event
Kirsten Marshall	9
Jaimee Gardner	8
Katelyn Wasylkiw	3
Ashley Waye	7

Quarterfinals
Chrissy Cadorin	10
Kirsten Marshall	2
Jo-Ann Rizzo	6
Ashley Waye	3

Semifinals
Chrissy Cadorin	4
Jo-Ann Rizzo	5

To playoff
Jo-Ann Rizzo	10
Cathy Auld	4

C1 event		Quarterfinals		Semifinals		To playoff
				Chrissy Cadorin	3
Heather Heggestad	7			Heather Heggestad	8
Ashley Waye	0	Heather Heggestad	7
Hailey Armstrong	4	Kirsten Marshall	4
Kirsten Marshall	8					Chelsea Brandwood	6
						Heather Heggestad	4

C2 event		Quarterfinals		Semifinals		To playoff
				Kaitlin Jewer	5
Jaimee Gardner	1			Erica Hopson	6
Sherry Middaugh	8	Sherry Middaugh	5
Katelyn Wasylkiw	3	Erica Hopson	7
Erica Hopson	6					Cathy Auld	8
						Erica Hopson	5

Playoff 1		To Provincials
Jo-Ann Rizzo	8
Chelsea Brandwood	2	Hollie Duncan	7
		Jo-Ann Rizzo	2

Playoff 2		To Provincials
Danielle Inglis	5
Cathy Auld	4	Jestyn Murphy	9
		Danielle Inglis	7

=== Open qualifier ===
January 11–13, 2019, Niagara Falls Curling Club, Niagara Falls

A event
Veronica Bernard (Elmira)	8
Laura Brown (Royal Kingston)	5

Round of 16
Chrissy Cadorin (Royals)	8
Marteen Jones (Ennismore)	6
Chelsea Brandwood (Listowel)	8
Kaitlin Jewer (Lindsay)	1
Danielle Inglis (Dixie)	8
Veronica Bernard	2
Julie Hastings (Bayview)	3
Sherry Middaugh (Thornhill)	11
Jo-Ann Rizzo (Brantford)	2
Sierra Sutherland (Rideau)	10
Katelyn Wasylkiw (Unionville)	8
Hailey Armstrong (Rideau)	7
Erica Hopson (Rideau)	8
Kirsten Marshall (London)	6
Rachel Steele (Port Perry)	6
Cathy Auld (Cataraqui)	8

Quarterfinals
Chrissy Cadorin	4
Chelsea Brandwood	8
Danielle Inglis	8
Sherry Middaugh	2
Sierra Sutherland	6
Katelyn Wasylkiw	11
Erica Hopson	5
Cathy Auld	7

Semifinals
Chelsea Brandwood	6
Danielle Inglis	4
Katelyn Wasylkiw	7
Cathy Auld	9

A Final
Chelsea Brandwood	2
Cathy Auld	9

B event (top half)
Kaitlin Jewer	12
Marteen Jones	6

Quarterfinals
Laura Brown	3
Kaitlin Jewer	10
Veronica Bernard	1
Julie Hastings	9

Semifinals
Erica Hopson	7
Kaitlin Jewer	3
Sierra Sutherland	3
Julie Hastings	5

To B quarterfinals
Erica Hopson	8
Julie Hastings	7

B event (bottom half)
Hailey Armstrong	9
Jo-Ann Rizzo	5
Kirsten Marshall	13
Rachel Steele	5

Semifinals
Sherry Middaugh	7
Hailey Armstrong	8
Chrissy Cadorin	7
Kirsten Marshall	5

To B quarterfinals
Hailey Armstrong	8
Chrissy Cadorin	7

B quarterfinals		Semifinals		B final
				Chelsea Brandwood	8
Danielle Inglis	6			Hailey Armstrong	5
Erica Hopson	4	Danielle Inglis	6
Katelyn Wasylkiw	9	Hailey Armstrong	9
Hailey Armstrong	10
