= Jestyn Murphy =

Canadian curler (born 1996)

- Born: 1996/09/21; Halifax, Nova Scotia

Jestyn Murphy (born September 21, 1996) is a Canadian curler from Mississauga, Ontario.

== Career ==
=== Youth ===
Murphy won the Ontario Bantam championship in 2013, skipping a team out of the Listowel Curling Club.

Murphy was a member of the University of Guelph women's curling team. In her first year, Murphy played third for the team, which was skipped by Katelyn Wasylkiw. The team played in the 2015 CIS/CCA Curling Championships, going 3-4. The next season, Murphy skipped the team, and led them to a bronze medal at the 2016 CIS/CCA Curling Championships. Murphy was named then Gryphon Athlete of the Week for the University of Guelph.

=== Women's ===
Murphy was the alternate for the Jacqueline Harrison rink at the 2017 Canadian Olympic Pre-Trials, but missed the playoffs. She played for the team at the 2017 Boost National Grand Slam of Curling event, finishing with a 1-3 record.

In 2018, Murphy formed a new team with her mother Janet, Stephanie Matheson and Grace Holyoke. The team qualified for the 2019 Ontario Scotties Tournament of Hearts, the first for Jestyn as a skip. There, she made it to the semifinal, where she lost to Julie Tippin. She had previously played in the 2017 Ontario Scotties Tournament of Hearts as the alternate on the Harrison rink, which lost in the final. Murphy and her team played in the 2020 Ontario Scotties Tournament of Hearts as well, where she lost in the tiebreaker game against Hollie Duncan.

From 2020 to 2023, Murphy played on a rink consisting of Grace Holyoke, Stephanie Matheson and Carly Howard, daughter of Glenn Howard.

== Personal life ==
Murphy's father Hugh was president of the Toronto Curling Association and a competitive mixed doubles curler with his wife, Janet. Murphy has a Bachelor of Science from the University of Guelph with a major in zoology. She was enrolled in a Bachelor of Education program at Brock University. She currently works as a supply teacher and as a curling instructor at the Mississaugua Golf & Country Club.
