= 2012 KW Fall Classic =

- Host city: Waterloo, Ontario, Canada
- Arena: Kitchener-Waterloo Granite Curling Club
- Dates: September 20–23
- Men's winner: (Ontario) Mark Kean
- Curling club: Toronto, Ontario
- Skip: Mark Kean
- Third: Travis Fanset
- Second: Patrick Janssen
- Lead: Tim March
- Finalist: (Ontario) Greg Balsdon
- Women's winner: (Wisconsin) Erika Brown
- Curling club: Madison, Wisconsin
- Skip: Erika Brown
- Third: Debbie McCormick
- Second: Jessica Schultz
- Lead: Ann Swisshelm
- Finalist: (Ontario) Kristy Russell

The 2012 KW Fall Classic was held from September 20 to 23 at the Kitchener-Waterloo Granite Curling Club in Waterloo, Ontario as part of the 2012–13 Ontario Curling Tour. The men's event was held in a triple knockout format, and the women's event was in a round robin format. The purse for the men's event was CAD$8,500, and the purse for the women's event was CAD$15,000.

== Men ==
=== Teams ===
Skip	Third	Second	Lead	Locale
Mike Anderson	Chris Van Huyse	Matt Sheppard	Sean Harrison	Markham, Ontario
Greg Balsdon	Mark Bice	Tyler Morgan	Jamie Farnell	Toronto, Ontario
Mike Bryson	Wesley Forget	Danny Dow	Scott Chadwick	Toronto, Ontario
Andrew Nerpin (fourth)	Jeff Clark (skip)	John Butler	Rob Steele	Ontario
Pat Ferris	Andrew Fairfull	Craig Fairfull	Rob Larmer	Grimsby, Ontario
John Grant	Jeff Grant	Kevin Flewwelling	Larry Tobin	Toronto, Ontario
Cory Heggestad	Wayne Warren	Derek Abbotts	Scott Borland	Orillia, Ontario
Brent Ross (fourth)	Jake Higgs (skip)	Codey Maus	Bill Buchanan	Harriston, Ontario
Wes Johnson	Punit Sthankiya	Kevin Hawkshaw	Mark Bresee	Toronto, Ontario
David Kaun	Robert Wright	John Gabel	Al Stahl	Kitchener, Ontario
Mark Kean	Travis Fanset	Patrick Janssen	Tim March	Toronto, Ontario
Axel Larsen	Walter Johnson	Gerry Sundwall	Kenny Cox	Guelph, Ontario
Scott McDonald	Ryan Myler	Chris De Cloet	Kevin Ackerman	London, Ontario
Fraser Reid	Blake Sandham	Jonah Mondloch	Rory James	Waterloo, Ontario
Robert Rumfeldt	Adam Spencer	Scott Hodgson	Greg Robinson	Guelph, Ontario
George White	Scott Buchan	Matt Ignor	Graham Rae	Stratford, Ontario

=== Knockout results ===
==== A event ====
First Knockout		Semifinals		Qualifier 1
(Ontario) Robert Rumfeldt	4
(Ontario) David Kaun	2	(Ontario) Robert Rumfeldt	5
(Ontario) Scott McDonald	8	(Ontario) Scott McDonald	4
(Ontario) John Grant	2			(Ontario) Robert Rumfeldt	7
(Ontario) Greg Balsdon	6			(Ontario) Cory Heggestad	3
(Ontario) Wes Johnson	5	(Ontario) Greg Balsdon	5
(Ontario) Cory Heggestad	6	(Ontario) Cory Heggestad	6
(Ontario) Fraser Reid	5

First Knockout		Semifinals		Qualifier 2
(Ontario) Mark Kean	10
(Ontario) Axel Larsen	3	(Ontario) Mark Kean	6
(Ontario) Jake Higgs	8	(Ontario) Jake Higgs	5
(Ontario) George White	1			(Ontario) Mark Kean	4
(Ontario) Mike Anderson	4			(Ontario) Pat Ferris	7
(Ontario) Mike Bryson	9	(Ontario) Mike Bryson	5
(Ontario) Jeff Clark	3	(Ontario) Pat Ferris	7
(Ontario) Pat Ferris	6

==== B event ====
Second Knockout		Semifinals		Qualifier 3
(Ontario) David Kaun	6
(Ontario) John Grant	5	(Ontario) John Grant	8
(Ontario) Wes Johnson	4	(Ontario) Fraser Reid	5
(Ontario) Fraser Reid	5			(Ontario) John Grant	2
				(Ontario) Mark Kean	6

Second Knockout		Semifinals		Qualifier 4
(Ontario) Axel Larsen	6
(Ontario) George White	4	(Ontario) Axel Larsen	6
(Ontario) Mike Anderson	7	(Ontario) Mike Anderson	7
(Ontario) Jeff Clark	4			(Ontario) Mike Anderson	6
				(Ontario) Cory Heggestad	5

Second Knockout
(Ontario) Scott McDonald	3
(Ontario) Greg Balsdon	9
(Ontario) Jake Higgs	9
(Ontario) Mike Bryson	5

Qualifier 5
(Ontario) Greg Balsdon	2
(Ontario) Jake Higgs	7

==== C event ====
Third Knockout		Semifinals		Qualifier 6
(Ontario) David Kaun	5
(Ontario) Wes Johnson	6	(Ontario) Wes Johnson	3
		(Ontario) Mike Bryson	4
				(Ontario) Mike Bryson	1
				(Ontario) Greg Balsdon	8

Third Knockout		Semifinals		Qualifier 7
(Ontario) George White	1
(Ontario) Jeff Clark	7	(Ontario) Jeff Clark	1
		(Ontario) Scott McDonald	6
				(Ontario) Scott McDonald	5
				(Ontario) Cory Heggestad	3

Third Knockout			Qualifier 8
			1	(Ontario) Axel Larsen	4
2	(Ontario) Fraser Reid	7		(Ontario) John Grant	8
3	(Ontario) Axel Larsen	8

=== Playoffs ===
Quarterfinals
(Ontario) Robert Rumfeldt	3
(Ontario) Greg Balsdon	4
(Ontario) Jake Higgs	7
(Ontario) John Grant	1
(Ontario) Pat Ferris	7
(Ontario) Scott McDonald	6
(Ontario) Mark Kean	6
(Ontario) Mike Anderson	5

Semifinals
(Ontario) Greg Balsdon	5
(Ontario) Jake Higgs	2
(Ontario) Pat Ferris	5
(Ontario) Mark Kean	6

Final
(Ontario) Greg Balsdon	3
(Ontario) Mark Kean	6

== Women ==
=== Teams ===
Skip	Third	Second	Lead	Locale
Tiffany Anjema	Halyna Tepylo	Pam Feldkamp	Bridget Arnold	Waterloo, Ontario
Cathy Auld	Janet Murphy	Stephanie Gray	Melissa Foster	Mississauga, Ontario
Marika Bakewell	Jessica Corrado	Stephanie Corrado	Jordan Robertson	Burlington, Ontario
Erika Brown	Debbie McCormick	Jessica Schultz	Ann Swisshelm	Madison, Wisconsin
Chrissy Cadorin	Janet Langevinl	Sandy Becher	Cindy McKnight	Toronto, Ontario
Kelly Cochrane	Brenna Cochrane	Adele Campbell	Joanne Curtis	Toronto, Ontario
Ginger Coyle	Lauren Wood	Laura Brown	Robyn Murphy	Dundas, Ontario
Lisa Farnell	Erin Morrissey	Karen Sagle	Ainsley Galbraith	Elgin, Ontario
Heather Graham	Margie Hewitt	Amy MacKay	Amanda Zufich	Barrie, Ontario
Julie Hastings	Christy Trombley	Stacey Smith	Katrina Collins	Thornhill, Ontario
Kendall Haymes	Margot Flemming	Cassie Savage	Megan Arnold	Waterloo, Ontario
Courtney Hodgson	Jenna Bonner	Amanda Gebhardt	Amber Gebhardt	Guelph, Ontario
Katie Lindsay	Nicole Westlund	Jenn Clark	Stephanie Thompson	Welland, Ontario
Jill Mouzar	Stephanie LeDrew	Danielle Inglis	Hollie Nicol	Toronto, Ontario
Allison Nimik	Katie Pringle	Lynn Kreviazuk	Morgan Court	Toronto, Ontario
Brit O'Neill	Mallory Buist	Jenn Minchin	Jasmine Thurston	Hamilton, Ontario
Julie Reddick	Carrie Lindner	Megan Balsdon	Laura Hickey	Toronto, Ontario
Caitlin Romain	Carly Howard	Kerilynn Mathers	Cheryl Kreviazuk	Kitchener, Ontario
Kirsty Russell	Michelle Gray	Tina Mazerolle	Allison Singh	Shelburne, Ontario
Anna Sidorova	Liudmilla Privivkova	Margarita Fomina	Ekaterina Galkina	Moscow, Russia
Jamie Sinclair	Holly Donaldson	Erin Jenkins	Katelyn Wasylkiw	Manotick, Ontario
Jennifer Spencer	Karyn Issler	Jenn Ellard	Michelle Laidlaw	Brampton, Ontario
Ashley Waye	Denise Donovan	Naomi Visanji	MArnie Loeb	Toronto, Ontario

=== Round Robin Standings ===
Key
Teams to Playoffs

Pool A	W	L
(Ontario) Lisa Farnell	3	1
(Ontario) Kendall Haymes	3	1
(Russia) Anna Sidorova	2	2
(Ontario) Katie Lindsay	1	3
(Ontario) Jennifer Spencer	1	3

Pool B	W	L
(Wisconsin) Erika Brown	3	1
(Ontario) Jill Mouzar	3	1
(Ontario) Courtney Hodgson	2	2
(Ontario) Caitlin Romain	1	3
(Ontario) Ashley Waye	1	3

Pool C	W	L
(Ontario) Julie Hastings	3	1
(Ontario) Kirsty Russell	3	1
(Ontario) Kelly Cochrane	2	2
(Ontario) Ginger Coyle	1	3
(Ontario) Brit O'Neill	1	3

Pool D	W	L
(Ontario) Julie Reddick	3	1
(Ontario) Chrissy Cadorin	2	2
(Ontario) Marika Bakewell	1	3
(Ontario) Jamie Sinclair	1	3

Pool E	W	L
(Ontario) Cathy Auld	4	0
(Ontario) Heather Graham	3	1
(Ontario) Allison Nimik	2	2
(Ontario) Tiffany Anjema	0	4

=== Playoffs ===
Quarterfinal 1
(Ontario) Kirsty Russell	5
(Ontario) Heather Graham	2
(Ontario) Lisa Farnell	6
(Ontario) Allison Nimik	3

Quarterfinal 2
(Ontario) Kirsty Russell	7
(Ontario) Cathy Auld	5
(Ontario) Kendall Haymes	2
(Ontario) Julie Reddick	4
(Ontario) Lisa Farnell	9
(Ontario) Julie Hastings	6
(Ontario) Jill Mouzar	2
(Wisconsin) Erika Brown	5

SemiFinal
(Ontario) Kirsty Russell	7
(Ontario) Julie Reddick	5
(Ontario) Lisa Farnell	2
(Wisconsin) Erika Brown	6

Final
(Ontario) Kirsty Russell	4
(Wisconsin) Erika Brown	5
