= 2026 KW Fall Classic =

- Host city: Waterloo, Ontario
- Arena: KW Granite Club
- Dates: September 4–7
- Men's winner: (Switzerland) Team K. Schwaller
- Curling club: CC Oberwallis, Oberwallis
- Skip: Kim Schwaller
- Third: Max Winz
- Second: Andreas Gerlach
- Lead: Jan Iseli
- Finalist: (Italy) Stefano Spiller
- Women's winner: (Switzerland) Team X. Schwaller
- Curling club: GC Zurich, Zurich
- Skip: Xenia Schwaller
- Third: Selina Gafner
- Second: Fabienne Rieder
- Lead: Selina Rychiger
- Coach: John Epping & Andreas Schwaller
- Finalist: (Ontario) Kira Brunton

The 2026 Hogged Rock KW Fall Classic presented by Runback Brewing was held from September 4 to 7 at the KW Granite Club in Waterloo, Ontario. Both events were held in a round robin format with a purse of $15,000 for the men and women.

== Men ==
=== Teams ===
The teams are listed as follows:

Skip	Third	Second	Lead	Alternate	Locale
Brendan Bottcher	Jacob Horgan	Tanner Horgan	Geoff Walker		Edmonton, Alberta
Jason Camm	Sam Wills	Wyatt Small	Nathan Steele		Navan, Ontario
Jordan Chandler	Landan Rooney	Connor Lawes	Nathan Kim		Little Current, Ontario
Robert Desjardins	Jean-François Charest	Thierry Fournier	René Dubois		Chicoutimi, Quebec
Mike Fournier	Charlie Richard	Punit Sthankiya	Graeme Robson		Toronto, Ontario
Daniel Hocevar	Zander Elmes	Joel Matthews	Daniel Del Conte		Toronto, Ontario
Jayden King	Dylan Niepage	Owen Henry	Victor Pietrangelo		Tillsonburg, Ontario
Jacob Lamb	Daniel Vanveghel	Carter Bryant	Eric Fenech		Guelph, Ontario
Jordon McDonald	Jacques Gauthier	Elias Huminicki	Cameron Olafson		Winnipeg, Manitoba
Scott McDonald	Sam Steep	Oliver Campbell	Paul Moffatt		Waterloo, Ontario
Mike McEwen	Rylan Kleiter	Joshua Mattern	Trevor Johnson		Saskatoon, Saskatchewan
Sam Mooibroek	Owen Purcell	Scott Mitchell	Gavin Lydiate		Whitby, Ontario
Kibo Mulima	Riley Fung-Ernst	Nate Thomas	Daniel Krowchuk		Waterloo, Ontario
Owen Nicholls	Jordan McNamara	Jack Ragan	Jacob Clarke	Philip Burgess	Ottawa, Ontario
Joël Retornaz	Stefano Gilli	Andrea Gilli	Alberto Pimpini		Brunico, Italy
Kim Schwaller	Max Winz	Andreas Gerlach	Jan Iseli		Oberwallis, Switzerland
Stefano Spiller	Amos Mosaner	Sebastiano Arman	Cesare Spiller		Trentino, Italy
Colten Steele	Rene Comeau	Alex Robichaud	Cameron Sallaj		Fredericton, New Brunswick
Ryan Thompson-Brown	Joseph Trieu	Devon Ryan	Marty Thompson		Toronto, Ontario
Mattia Giovanella (Fourth)	Alberto Zisa (Skip)	Francesco De Zanna	Francesco Vigliani		Trentino, Italy

=== Round robin standings ===
Final Round Robin Standings

Key
Teams to Playoffs

Pool A	W	L
(Alberta) Brendan Bottcher	4	0
(Ontario) Sam Mooibroek	3	1
(Italy) Alberto Zisa	2	2
(Ontario) Scott McDonald	1	3
(Quebec) Robert Desjardins	0	4

Pool B	W	L
(Switzerland) Kim Schwaller	3	1
(Ontario) Jordan Chandler	3	1
(Italy) Stefano Spiller	3	1
(Ontario) Kibo Mulima	1	3
(Ontario) Jason Camm	0	4

Pool C	W	L
(Italy) Joël Retornaz	3	1
(Ontario) Jayden King	3	1
(Ontario) Daniel Hocevar	3	1
(Ontario) Jacob Lamb	1	3
(New Brunswick) Colten Steele	0	4

Pool D	W	L
(Saskatchewan) Mike McEwen	4	0
(Manitoba) Jordon McDonald	2	2
(Ontario) Mike Fournier	2	2
(Ontario) Owen Nicholls	1	3
(Ontario) Ryan Thompson-Brown	1	3

=== Round robin results ===
All draw times are listed in Eastern Time (UTC−04:00).

==== Draw 1 ====
Friday, September 4, 9:00 am

Sheet 2	1	2	3	4	5	6	7	8	Final
(Ontario) Jordan Chandler 🔨	2	0	3	1	0	3	X	X	9
(Ontario) Kibo Mulima	0	2	0	0	1	0	X	X	3

Sheet 4	1	2	3	4	5	6	7	8	9	Final
(Ontario) Sam Mooibroek	0	2	1	0	1	0	0	1	1	6
(Ontario) Scott McDonald 🔨	1	0	0	3	0	0	1	0	0	5

==== Draw 2 ====
Friday, September 4, 11:30 am

Sheet 4	1	2	3	4	5	6	7	8	Final
(Alberta) Brendan Bottcher 🔨	1	1	0	0	4	1	X	X	7
(Italy) Alberto Zisa	0	0	1	1	0	0	X	X	2

Sheet 5	1	2	3	4	5	6	7	8	9	Final
(Ontario) Mike Fournier	0	2	0	2	0	1	1	0	1	7
(Ontario) Ryan Thompson-Brown 🔨	1	0	3	0	0	0	0	2	0	6

Sheet 6	1	2	3	4	5	6	7	8	Final
(Italy) Joël Retornaz 🔨	0	0	1	0	0	1	X	X	2
(Ontario) Jayden King	0	2	0	0	2	0	X	X	4

==== Draw 3 ====
Friday, September 4, 2:30 pm

Sheet 2	1	2	3	4	5	6	7	8	Final
(Switzerland) Kim Schwaller	1	0	0	1	0	0	4	X	6
(Italy) Stefano Spiller 🔨	0	1	0	0	0	1	0	X	2

Sheet 3	1	2	3	4	5	6	7	8	9	Final
(Saskatchewan) Mike McEwen	0	2	0	0	1	0	1	0	2	6
(Manitoba) Jordon McDonald 🔨	1	0	0	1	0	1	0	1	0	4

Sheet 6	1	2	3	4	5	6	7	8	Final
(Ontario) Daniel Hocevar	0	3	0	1	0	5	X	X	9
(Ontario) Jacob Lamb 🔨	1	0	0	0	1	0	X	X	2

==== Draw 4 ====
Friday, September 4, 5:00 pm

Sheet 2	1	2	3	4	5	6	7	8	Final
(Quebec) Robert Desjardins	0	0	0	0	0	1	X	X	1
(Italy) Alberto Zisa 🔨	3	0	4	3	1	0	X	X	11

Sheet 4	1	2	3	4	5	6	7	8	Final
(New Brunswick) Colten Steele	0	3	0	0	0	2	0	X	5
(Italy) Joël Retornaz 🔨	3	0	2	1	2	0	1	X	9

Sheet 6	1	2	3	4	5	6	7	8	Final
(Ontario) Jason Camm	3	0	0	1	0	0	2	0	6
(Ontario) Jordan Chandler 🔨	0	2	1	0	0	3	0	1	7

==== Draw 5 ====
Friday, September 4, 8:00 pm

Sheet 2	1	2	3	4	5	6	7	8	9	Final
(Alberta) Brendan Bottcher	0	0	1	0	2	1	1	0	1	6
(Ontario) Scott McDonald 🔨	0	3	0	1	0	0	0	1	0	5

Sheet 3	1	2	3	4	5	6	7	8	Final
(Ontario) Owen Nicholls 🔨	1	0	0	1	1	0	1	4	8
(Ontario) Ryan Thompson-Brown	0	1	1	0	0	1	0	0	3

Sheet 6	1	2	3	4	5	6	7	8	Final
(Italy) Stefano Spiller 🔨	0	2	0	1	2	1	2	X	8
(Ontario) Kibo Mulima	1	0	1	0	0	0	0	X	2

==== Draw 6 ====
Saturday, September 5, 9:00 am

Sheet 2	1	2	3	4	5	6	7	8	Final
(Saskatchewan) Mike McEwen 🔨	0	0	0	2	1	1	0	0	4
(Ontario) Mike Fournier	0	0	0	0	0	0	2	1	3

Sheet 4	1	2	3	4	5	6	7	8	Final
(Ontario) Daniel Hocevar	0	2	0	2	1	0	0	1	6
(Ontario) Jayden King 🔨	2	0	2	0	0	1	0	0	5

==== Draw 7 ====
Saturday, September 5, 11:30 am

Sheet 1	1	2	3	4	5	6	7	8	Final
(Quebec) Robert Desjardins 🔨	1	0	1	0	0	1	0	X	3
(Ontario) Sam Mooibroek	0	1	0	0	2	0	4	X	7

Sheet 3	1	2	3	4	5	6	7	8	Final
(New Brunswick) Colten Steele 🔨	0	1	0	1	0	1	0	X	3
(Ontario) Jacob Lamb	0	0	2	0	1	0	3	X	6

Sheet 5	1	2	3	4	5	6	7	8	Final
(Switzerland) Kim Schwaller	1	0	2	0	3	0	3	X	9
(Ontario) Jason Camm 🔨	0	3	0	1	0	1	0	X	5

==== Draw 8 ====
Saturday, September 5, 2:30 pm

Sheet 1	1	2	3	4	5	6	7	8	Final
(Italy) Alberto Zisa 🔨	1	0	3	0	2	1	X	X	7
(Ontario) Scott McDonald	0	1	0	1	0	0	X	X	2

Sheet 4	1	2	3	4	5	6	7	8	9	Final
(Ontario) Owen Nicholls 🔨	0	2	0	2	0	2	0	0	0	6
(Manitoba) Jordon McDonald	1	0	2	0	1	0	1	1	1	7

Sheet 5	1	2	3	4	5	6	7	8	Final
(Italy) Stefano Spiller	0	2	0	3	0	2	0	2	9
(Ontario) Jordan Chandler 🔨	2	0	1	0	2	0	2	0	7

==== Draw 9 ====
Saturday, September 5, 5:00 pm

Sheet 3	1	2	3	4	5	6	7	8	Final
(Ontario) Daniel Hocevar	0	1	0	1	0	1	0	X	3
(Italy) Joël Retornaz 🔨	2	0	2	0	1	0	2	X	7

Sheet 5	1	2	3	4	5	6	7	8	Final
(Alberta) Brendan Bottcher	0	0	3	3	0	0	X	X	6
(Quebec) Robert Desjardins 🔨	0	1	0	0	0	1	X	X	2

Sheet 6	1	2	3	4	5	6	7	8	Final
(Saskatchewan) Mike McEwen 🔨	0	5	0	1	0	4	X	X	10
(Ontario) Ryan Thompson-Brown	0	0	0	0	1	0	X	X	1

==== Draw 10 ====
Saturday, September 5, 8:00 pm

Sheet 1	1	2	3	4	5	6	7	8	Final
(New Brunswick) Colten Steele 🔨	3	0	0	0	1	0	X	X	4
(Ontario) Jayden King	0	2	1	1	0	5	X	X	9

Sheet 3	1	2	3	4	5	6	7	8	Final
(Ontario) Jason Camm	0	2	0	0	1	0	0	0	4
(Ontario) Kibo Mulima 🔨	3	0	0	1	0	0	1	3	8

Sheet 5	1	2	3	4	5	6	7	8	Final
(Manitoba) Jordon McDonald	0	1	0	2	2	1	0	X	6
(Ontario) Mike Fournier 🔨	2	0	1	0	0	0	1	X	4

==== Draw 11 ====
Sunday, September 6, 9:00 am

Sheet 1	1	2	3	4	5	6	7	8	Final
(Italy) Joël Retornaz	0	2	2	0	0	0	2	X	6
(Ontario) Jacob Lamb 🔨	0	0	0	1	1	0	0	X	2

Sheet 3	1	2	3	4	5	6	7	8	Final
(Switzerland) Kim Schwaller 🔨	0	2	0	2	0	0	0	X	4
(Ontario) Jordan Chandler	0	0	3	0	2	1	1	X	7

Sheet 5	1	2	3	4	5	6	7	8	Final
(Italy) Alberto Zisa 🔨	0	0	0	2	0	1	0	0	3
(Ontario) Sam Mooibroek	0	0	1	0	0	0	2	1	4

==== Draw 12 ====
Sunday, September 6, 11:30 am

Sheet 1	1	2	3	4	5	6	7	8	Final
(Italy) Stefano Spiller 🔨	1	2	3	0	X	X	X	X	6
(Ontario) Jason Camm	0	0	0	1	X	X	X	X	1

Sheet 3	1	2	3	4	5	6	7	8	Final
(Quebec) Robert Desjardins 🔨	1	0	1	0	X	X	X	X	2
(Ontario) Scott McDonald	0	3	0	4	X	X	X	X	7

Sheet 5	1	2	3	4	5	6	7	8	Final
(Ontario) Owen Nicholls	0	1	0	0	X	X	X	X	1
(Saskatchewan) Mike McEwen 🔨	2	0	3	2	X	X	X	X	7

==== Draw 13 ====
Sunday, September 6, 2:30 pm

Sheet 1	1	2	3	4	5	6	7	8	Final
(Manitoba) Jordon McDonald	1	0	0	0	0	1	1	0	3
(Ontario) Ryan Thompson-Brown 🔨	0	1	1	1	1	0	0	1	5

Sheet 3	1	2	3	4	5	6	7	8	Final
(Alberta) Brendan Bottcher 🔨	2	1	3	0	X	X	X	X	6
(Ontario) Sam Mooibroek	0	0	0	1	X	X	X	X	1

Sheet 5	1	2	3	4	5	6	7	8	Final
(New Brunswick) Colten Steele 🔨	0	2	0	1	0	0	0	X	3
(Ontario) Daniel Hocevar	1	0	2	0	2	1	2	X	8

==== Draw 14 ====
Sunday, September 6, 5:00 pm

Sheet 1	1	2	3	4	5	6	7	8	Final
(Switzerland) Kim Schwaller	1	4	1	0	0	1	X	X	7
(Ontario) Kibo Mulima 🔨	0	0	0	1	0	0	X	X	1

Sheet 3	1	2	3	4	5	6	7	8	Final
(Ontario) Owen Nicholls 🔨	0	0	0	0	1	0	2	0	3
(Ontario) Mike Fournier	0	0	2	2	0	1	0	1	6

Sheet 5	1	2	3	4	5	6	7	8	Final
(Ontario) Jayden King	0	1	0	2	3	3	X	X	9
(Ontario) Jacob Lamb 🔨	1	0	1	0	0	0	X	X	2

=== Playoffs ===
Qualification
8	(Ontario) Daniel Hocevar	1
9	(Ontario) Sam Mooibroek	7
7	(Ontario) Jayden King	6
10	(Italy) Alberto Zisa	5

Quarterfinals
1	(Alberta) Brendan Bottcher	9
9	(Ontario) Sam Mooibroek	2
4	(Switzerland) Kim Schwaller	4
5	(Ontario) Jordan Chandler	1
2	(Saskatchewan) Mike McEwen	5
7	(Ontario) Jayden King	6
3	(Italy) Joël Retornaz	3
6	(Italy) Stefano Spiller	5

Semifinals
1	(Alberta) Brendan Bottcher	3
4	(Switzerland) Kim Schwaller	5
7	(Ontario) Jayden King	4
6	(Italy) Stefano Spiller	5

Final
4	(Switzerland) Kim Schwaller	6
6	(Italy) Stefano Spiller	5

==== Qualification ====
Sunday, September 6, 8:00 pm

Sheet 4	1	2	3	4	5	6	7	8	9	Final
(Ontario) Jayden King 🔨	1	0	0	2	0	2	0	0	1	6
(Italy) Alberto Zisa	0	1	0	0	3	0	0	1	0	5

Sheet 6	1	2	3	4	5	6	7	8	Final
(Ontario) Daniel Hocevar 🔨	0	0	1	0	X	X	X	X	1
(Ontario) Sam Mooibroek	3	2	0	2	X	X	X	X	7

==== Quarterfinals ====
Sunday, September 6, 8:00 pm

Sheet 2	1	2	3	4	5	6	7	8	Final
(Italy) Joël Retornaz	0	0	0	2	0	1	0	0	3
(Italy) Stefano Spiller 🔨	0	2	0	0	2	0	0	1	5

Monday, September 7, 9:00 am

Sheet 2	1	2	3	4	5	6	7	8	Final
(Saskatchewan) Mike McEwen 🔨	2	0	0	0	2	0	1	0	5
(Ontario) Jayden King	0	0	1	1	0	2	0	2	6

Sheet 4	1	2	3	4	5	6	7	8	Final
(Alberta) Brendan Bottcher 🔨	2	1	0	2	0	4	X	X	9
(Ontario) Sam Mooibroek	0	0	1	0	1	0	X	X	2

Sheet 6	1	2	3	4	5	6	7	8	Final
(Switzerland) Kim Schwaller	1	0	2	1	X	X	X	X	4
(Ontario) Jordan Chandler 🔨	0	1	0	0	X	X	X	X	1

==== Semifinals ====
Monday, September 7, 12:00 pm

Sheet 2	1	2	3	4	5	6	7	8	Final
(Alberta) Brendan Bottcher 🔨	0	2	0	1	0	0	0	X	3
(Switzerland) Kim Schwaller	0	0	3	0	0	1	1	X	5

Sheet 3	1	2	3	4	5	6	7	8	9	Final
(Ontario) Jayden King 🔨	0	2	0	0	0	1	0	1	0	4
(Italy) Stefano Spiller	1	0	1	1	0	0	1	0	1	5

==== Final ====
Monday, September 7, 3:00 pm

Sheet 4	1	2	3	4	5	6	7	8	Final
(Switzerland) Kim Schwaller	0	1	0	1	1	0	2	1	6
(Italy) Stefano Spiller 🔨	2	0	2	0	0	1	0	0	5

== Women ==
=== Teams ===
The teams are listed as follows:

Skip	Third	Second	Lead	Locale
Kira Brunton	Kendra Lilly	Jamie Smith	Lauren Rajala	Sudbury, Ontario
Kate Cameron	Laurie St-Georges	Emily Riley	Émilia Gagné	Laval, Quebec
Grace Cave	Emily Deschenes	Madison Fisher	Melanie Ebach	North Dundas, Ontario
Sarah Daniels	Abby Ackland	Calissa Daly	Dayna Demmans	New Westminster, British Columbia
Kathleen Dubberstein	Leilani Dubberstein	Jessica Byers	Lindsey Schmalz	Manila, Philippines
Hollie Duncan (Fourth)	Megan Balsdon (Skip) (Note: Megan Balsdon skipped Team Duncan.)	Rachelle Strybosch	Tess Guyatt	Woodstock, Ontario
Katrina Frlan	Erika Wainwright	Sam Wall	Lauren Norman	Ottawa, Ontario
Amanda Gebhardt	Mackenzie Daley	Erin Cook	Allison Singh	Guelph, Ontario
Carly Howard	Grace Holyoke	Emma Artichuk	Alice Holyoke	Toronto, Ontario
Corrie Hürlimann	Marina Lörtscher	Celine Schwizgebel	Isabel Einspieler	Zug, Switzerland
Brooklyn Ideson	Lauren Evason	Aila Thompson	Clara Dissanayake	London, Ontario
Danielle Inglis	Jo-Ann Rizzo	Geri-Lynn Ramsay	Joanne Tarvit	Whitby, Ontario
Katelin Langford	Madison Onischke	Valorie Martin	Madeleine Foley	Uxbridge, Ontario
Grace Lloyd	Evelyn Robert	Michaela Robert	Rachel Steele	Whitby, Ontario
Jenny Madden	Bridget Whynot	Emily Parkinson	Jessica Guilbault	Ottawa, Ontario
Sherry Middaugh	Kelly Middaugh	Emily Middaugh	Megan Smith	Niagara Falls, Ontario
Chelsea Principi	Lauren Peskett	Brenda Chapman	Keira McLaughlin	Niagara Falls, Ontario
Xenia Schwaller	Selina Gafner	Fabienne Rieder	Selina Rychiger	Zurich, Switzerland
Rhonda Varnes	Grace Beaudry	Emily Ostrowsky	Kylie Lippens	Winnipeg, Manitoba
Dominique Vivier	Ava Acres	Paige Bown	Sadie McCutcheon	Navan, Ontario

=== Round robin standings ===
Final Round Robin Standings

Key
Teams to Playoffs

Pool A	W	L
(Switzerland) Xenia Schwaller	4	0
(Ontario) Carly Howard	3	1
(Ontario) Brooklyn Ideson	2	2
(British Columbia) Sarah Daniels	1	3
(Ontario) Amanda Gebhardt	0	4

Pool B	W	L
(Ontario) Danielle Inglis	3	1
(Quebec) Kate Cameron	3	1
(Switzerland) Corrie Hürlimann	3	1
(Ontario) Dominique Vivier	1	3
(Philippines) Kathleen Dubberstein	0	4

Pool C	W	L
(Ontario) Kira Brunton	3	1
(Ontario) Grace Lloyd	3	1
(Ontario) Grace Cave	2	2
(Manitoba) Rhonda Varnes	2	2
(Ontario) Katelin Langford	0	4

Pool D	W	L
(Ontario) Team Duncan	3	1
(Ontario) Sherry Middaugh	3	1
(Ontario) Chelsea Principi	2	2
(Ontario) Jenny Madden	1	3
(Ontario) Katrina Frlan	1	3

=== Round robin results ===
All draw times are listed in Eastern Time (UTC−04:00).

==== Draw 1 ====
Friday, September 4, 9:00 am

Sheet 3	1	2	3	4	5	6	7	8	Final
(Ontario) Amanda Gebhardt 🔨	1	0	1	0	0	3	0	X	5
(Ontario) Brooklyn Ideson	0	5	0	2	2	0	1	X	10

Sheet 5	1	2	3	4	5	6	7	8	Final
(Philippines) Kathleen Dubberstein 🔨	0	1	0	2	0	0	X	X	3
(Ontario) Dominique Vivier	2	0	3	0	3	1	X	X	9

==== Draw 2 ====
Friday, September 4, 11:30 am

Sheet 1	1	2	3	4	5	6	7	8	Final
(Ontario) Katelin Langford	0	1	0	0	1	X	X	X	2
(Ontario) Grace Cave 🔨	3	0	7	2	0	X	X	X	12

Sheet 2	1	2	3	4	5	6	7	8	Final
(Ontario) Katrina Frlan 🔨	3	1	0	3	3	0	X	X	10
(Ontario) Team Duncan	0	0	1	0	0	2	X	X	3

Sheet 3	1	2	3	4	5	6	7	8	Final
(Switzerland) Xenia Schwaller 🔨	1	0	3	0	0	1	1	X	6
(British Columbia) Sarah Daniels	0	2	0	1	0	0	0	X	3

==== Draw 3 ====
Friday, September 4, 2:30 pm

Sheet 1	1	2	3	4	5	6	7	8	Final
(Ontario) Grace Lloyd 🔨	1	0	1	0	0	2	2	0	6
(Ontario) Kira Brunton	0	3	0	4	1	0	0	1	9

Sheet 4	1	2	3	4	5	6	7	8	Final
(Ontario) Sherry Middaugh	0	0	2	0	3	0	0	2	7
(Ontario) Jenny Madden 🔨	1	0	0	2	0	1	0	0	4

Sheet 5	1	2	3	4	5	6	7	8	Final
(Quebec) Kate Cameron 🔨	3	0	1	3	0	1	3	X	11
(Switzerland) Corrie Hürlimann	0	1	0	0	2	0	0	X	3

==== Draw 4 ====
Friday, September 4, 5:00 pm

Sheet 1	1	2	3	4	5	6	7	8	Final
(Ontario) Danielle Inglis	0	2	0	3	2	0	0	X	7
(Philippines) Kathleen Dubberstein 🔨	1	0	1	0	0	1	1	X	4

Sheet 3	1	2	3	4	5	6	7	8	Final
(Manitoba) Rhonda Varnes	0	1	0	0	2	1	2	3	9
(Ontario) Katelin Langford 🔨	4	0	1	1	0	0	0	0	6

Sheet 5	1	2	3	4	5	6	7	8	Final
(Ontario) Carly Howard	0	0	1	1	2	0	0	1	5
(British Columbia) Sarah Daniels 🔨	0	2	0	0	0	2	0	0	4

==== Draw 5 ====
Friday, September 4, 8:00 pm

Sheet 1	1	2	3	4	5	6	7	8	Final
(Switzerland) Corrie Hürlimann	0	0	2	1	1	0	2	2	8
(Ontario) Dominique Vivier 🔨	1	1	0	0	0	2	0	0	4

Sheet 4	1	2	3	4	5	6	7	8	Final
(Ontario) Chelsea Principi	0	0	0	0	0	1	X	X	1
(Ontario) Team Duncan 🔨	3	0	1	0	3	0	X	X	7

Sheet 5	1	2	3	4	5	6	7	8	Final
(Switzerland) Xenia Schwaller	2	0	3	1	0	0	3	X	9
(Ontario) Brooklyn Ideson 🔨	0	1	0	0	0	1	0	X	2

==== Draw 6 ====
Saturday, September 5, 9:00 am

Sheet 3	1	2	3	4	5	6	7	8	Final
(Ontario) Grace Lloyd 🔨	0	2	0	2	0	3	0	X	7
(Ontario) Grace Cave	0	0	1	0	2	0	1	X	4

Sheet 5	1	2	3	4	5	6	7	8	Final
(Ontario) Sherry Middaugh	0	1	1	2	0	0	1	2	7
(Ontario) Katrina Frlan 🔨	2	0	0	0	0	4	0	0	6

==== Draw 7 ====
Saturday, September 5, 11:30 am

Sheet 2	1	2	3	4	5	6	7	8	Final
(Quebec) Kate Cameron	0	1	0	0	1	0	1	0	3
(Ontario) Danielle Inglis 🔨	0	0	1	1	0	1	0	1	4

Sheet 4	1	2	3	4	5	6	7	8	Final
(Manitoba) Rhonda Varnes	0	1	0	1	1	0	3	2	8
(Ontario) Kira Brunton 🔨	3	0	1	0	0	2	0	0	6

Sheet 6	1	2	3	4	5	6	7	8	Final
(Ontario) Carly Howard	0	2	0	5	0	0	1	X	8
(Ontario) Amanda Gebhardt 🔨	1	0	2	0	1	2	0	X	6

==== Draw 8 ====
Saturday, September 5, 2:30 pm

Sheet 2	1	2	3	4	5	6	7	8	Final
(Switzerland) Corrie Hürlimann 🔨	0	2	2	0	1	0	2	X	7
(Philippines) Kathleen Dubberstein	0	0	0	1	0	2	0	X	3

Sheet 3	1	2	3	4	5	6	7	8	Final
(Ontario) Chelsea Principi 🔨	1	0	4	5	X	X	X	X	10
(Ontario) Jenny Madden	0	1	0	0	X	X	X	X	1

Sheet 6	1	2	3	4	5	6	7	8	Final
(British Columbia) Sarah Daniels 🔨	0	1	0	0	1	0	X	X	2
(Ontario) Brooklyn Ideson	2	0	1	4	0	3	X	X	10

==== Draw 9 ====
Saturday, September 5, 5:00 pm

Sheet 1	1	2	3	4	5	6	7	8	9	Final
(Ontario) Sherry Middaugh	0	0	0	1	1	0	1	1	0	4
(Ontario) Team Duncan 🔨	0	1	1	0	0	2	0	0	3	7

Sheet 2	1	2	3	4	5	6	7	8	9	Final
(Switzerland) Xenia Schwaller	1	1	0	2	0	0	0	1	1	6
(Ontario) Carly Howard 🔨	0	0	1	0	2	1	1	0	0	5

Sheet 4	1	2	3	4	5	6	7	8	Final
(Ontario) Grace Lloyd	0	0	1	0	2	2	0	2	7
(Ontario) Katelin Langford 🔨	2	1	0	1	0	0	1	0	5

==== Draw 10 ====
Saturday, September 5, 8:00 pm

Sheet 2	1	2	3	4	5	6	7	8	Final
(Ontario) Jenny Madden	0	1	1	1	0	2	0	2	7
(Ontario) Katrina Frlan 🔨	3	0	0	0	1	0	2	0	6

Sheet 4	1	2	3	4	5	6	7	8	Final
(Ontario) Danielle Inglis 🔨	0	2	0	1	0	1	0	1	5
(Ontario) Dominique Vivier	0	0	0	0	1	0	1	0	2

Sheet 6	1	2	3	4	5	6	7	8	Final
(Manitoba) Rhonda Varnes 🔨	0	1	0	0	1	0	X	X	2
(Ontario) Grace Cave	0	0	2	5	0	1	X	X	8

==== Draw 11 ====
Sunday, September 6, 9:00 am

Sheet 2	1	2	3	4	5	6	7	8	Final
(British Columbia) Sarah Daniels	0	0	2	2	1	1	1	X	7
(Ontario) Amanda Gebhardt 🔨	2	1	0	0	0	0	0	X	3

Sheet 4	1	2	3	4	5	6	7	8	Final
(Quebec) Kate Cameron 🔨	0	1	3	2	3	X	X	X	9
(Philippines) Kathleen Dubberstein	0	0	0	0	0	X	X	X	0

Sheet 6	1	2	3	4	5	6	7	8	Final
(Ontario) Katelin Langford 🔨	0	0	1	1	0	1	0	X	3
(Ontario) Kira Brunton	1	1	0	0	1	0	3	X	6

==== Draw 12 ====
Sunday, September 6, 11:30 am

Sheet 2	1	2	3	4	5	6	7	8	Final
(Ontario) Chelsea Principi 🔨	0	1	0	0	0	X	X	X	1
(Ontario) Sherry Middaugh	2	0	3	1	1	X	X	X	7

Sheet 4	1	2	3	4	5	6	7	8	Final
(Ontario) Carly Howard	2	0	0	2	2	1	X	X	7
(Ontario) Brooklyn Ideson 🔨	0	1	0	0	0	0	X	X	1

Sheet 6	1	2	3	4	5	6	7	8	9	Final
(Switzerland) Corrie Hürlimann 🔨	0	0	2	0	0	2	0	0	1	5
(Ontario) Danielle Inglis	0	0	0	1	1	0	1	1	0	4

==== Draw 13 ====
Sunday, September 6, 2:30 pm

Sheet 2	1	2	3	4	5	6	7	8	Final
(Manitoba) Rhonda Varnes	0	0	0	1	0	0	X	X	1
(Ontario) Grace Lloyd 🔨	0	3	1	0	2	2	X	X	8

Sheet 4	1	2	3	4	5	6	7	8	Final
(Switzerland) Xenia Schwaller 🔨	1	1	0	5	1	0	X	X	8
(Ontario) Amanda Gebhardt	0	0	3	0	0	1	X	X	4

Sheet 6	1	2	3	4	5	6	7	8	Final
(Ontario) Jenny Madden 🔨	0	0	1	0	2	0	X	X	3
(Ontario) Team Duncan	0	3	0	2	0	3	X	X	8

==== Draw 14 ====
Sunday, September 6, 5:00 pm

Sheet 2	1	2	3	4	5	6	7	8	Final
(Ontario) Grace Cave 🔨	1	0	2	1	0	0	0	0	4
(Ontario) Kira Brunton	0	1	0	0	3	1	0	2	7

Sheet 4	1	2	3	4	5	6	7	8	Final
(Ontario) Chelsea Principi 🔨	0	1	0	2	0	1	0	1	5
(Ontario) Katrina Frlan	0	0	0	0	3	0	1	0	4

Sheet 6	1	2	3	4	5	6	7	8	Final
(Quebec) Kate Cameron	2	0	1	0	0	0	4	X	7
(Ontario) Dominique Vivier 🔨	0	2	0	2	0	0	0	X	4

=== Playoffs ===
Qualification
8	(Ontario) Carly Howard	10
9	(Ontario) Sherry Middaugh	2
7	(Ontario) Team Duncan	7
10	(Ontario) Chelsea Principi	6

Quarterfinals
1	(Switzerland) Xenia Schwaller	6
8	(Ontario) Carly Howard	1
4	(Ontario) Grace Lloyd	7
5	(Quebec) Kate Cameron	4
2	(Ontario) Danielle Inglis	6
7	(Ontario) Team Duncan	1
3	(Ontario) Kira Brunton	6
6	(Switzerland) Corrie Hürlimann	1

Semifinals
1	(Switzerland) Xenia Schwaller	8
4	(Ontario) Grace Lloyd	3
2	(Ontario) Danielle Inglis	1
3	(Ontario) Kira Brunton	5

Final
1	(Switzerland) Xenia Schwaller	7
3	(Ontario) Kira Brunton	2

==== Qualification ====
Sunday, September 6, 8:00 pm

Sheet 1	1	2	3	4	5	6	7	8	Final
(Ontario) Carly Howard	1	1	0	3	0	2	3	X	10
(Ontario) Sherry Middaugh 🔨	0	0	1	0	1	0	0	X	2

Sheet 3	1	2	3	4	5	6	7	8	Final
(Ontario) Team Duncan	1	0	1	0	3	2	0	0	7
(Ontario) Chelsea Principi 🔨	0	2	0	1	0	0	2	1	6

==== Quarterfinals ====
Sunday, September 6, 8:00 pm

Sheet 5	1	2	3	4	5	6	7	8	Final
(Ontario) Kira Brunton 🔨	2	0	0	1	1	1	1	X	6
(Switzerland) Corrie Hürlimann	0	0	1	0	0	0	0	X	1

Monday, September 7, 9:00 am

Sheet 1	1	2	3	4	5	6	7	8	Final
(Ontario) Grace Lloyd 🔨	2	0	1	0	0	0	2	2	7
(Quebec) Kate Cameron	0	1	0	2	0	1	0	0	4

Sheet 3	1	2	3	4	5	6	7	8	Final
(Switzerland) Xenia Schwaller 🔨	3	0	3	0	X	X	X	X	6
(Ontario) Carly Howard	0	1	0	0	X	X	X	X	1

Sheet 5	1	2	3	4	5	6	7	8	Final
(Ontario) Danielle Inglis 🔨	3	2	0	1	X	X	X	X	6
(Ontario) Team Duncan	0	0	1	0	X	X	X	X	1

==== Semifinals ====
Monday, September 7, 12:00 pm

Sheet 4	1	2	3	4	5	6	7	8	Final
(Ontario) Danielle Inglis	0	0	0	1	0	0	X	X	1
(Ontario) Kira Brunton 🔨	0	1	1	0	2	1	X	X	5

Sheet 5	1	2	3	4	5	6	7	8	Final
(Switzerland) Xenia Schwaller 🔨	2	0	2	0	2	0	2	X	8
(Ontario) Grace Lloyd	0	1	0	1	0	1	0	X	3

==== Final ====
Monday, September 7, 3:00 pm

Sheet 3	1	2	3	4	5	6	7	8	Final
(Switzerland) Xenia Schwaller 🔨	0	0	0	1	0	0	2	4	7
(Ontario) Kira Brunton	0	0	1	0	0	1	0	0	2
