= KW Fall Classic =

- Established: 2008
- 2026 host city: Waterloo, Ontario
- 2026 arena: KW Granite Club
- Men's purse: $15,000
- Women's purse: $15,000

Current champions (2026)
- Men: (Switzerland) Team K. Schwaller
- Women: (Switzerland) Team X. Schwaller

Current edition
- 2026 KW Fall Classic

Location in Canada

The KW Fall Classic is an annual bonspiel, or curling tournament, that takes place at the KW Granite Club in Waterloo, Ontario, Canada. The tournament has been held as part of the men's and women's Ontario Curling Tour, and both the men's and women's events were included in the World Curling Tour starting in 2013. It is considered a "development tour" event.

== Past champions ==
Only skip's name is displayed.

=== Men ===
Year	Winning skip	Runner up skip	Purse (CAD)
2008	(Ontario) Dale Matchett	(Ontario) Trevor Feil	$14,225
2009	(Ontario) Dale Matchett	(Ontario) Jake Higgs	$14,225
2010	(Ontario) Greg Balsdon	(Ontario) Wayne Middaugh	$10,825
2011	(Ontario) Robert Rumfeldt	(Ontario) Mike Anderson	$14,300
2012	(Ontario) Mark Kean	(Ontario) Greg Balsdon	$8,500
2013	(Ontario) Scott McDonald	(Ontario) Jake Walker	$8,500
2014	(Ontario) Scott McDonald	(Ontario) Richard Krell	$8,500
2015	(China) Liu Rui	(Ontario) Ian Dickie	$9,900
2016	(Ontario) Richard Krell	(Ontario) Ryan LeDrew	$9,900
2017	(Ontario) Matthew Hall	(Ontario) Rob Retchless	$9,900
2018	(Russia) Alexey Timofeev	(Ontario) Rob Ainsley	$8,400
2019	(Japan) Yusuke Morozumi	(Ontario) Wayne Tuck Jr.	$8,400
2020	(Ontario) Paul Moffatt	(Ontario) Glenn Howard	
2021	(Scotland) Ross Whyte	(Scotland) Kyle Waddell	$8,750
2022	(Ontario) Mike Fournier	(Ontario) Sam Steep	$9,750
2023	(Ontario) Alex Champ	(Switzerland) Yves Stocker	$12,500
2024	(Ontario) John Epping	(Japan) Riku Yanagisawa	$11,000
2025	(Italy) Joël Retornaz	(Ontario) Jayden King	$18,750
2026	(Switzerland) Kim Schwaller	(Italy) Stefano Spiller	$15,000

=== Women ===
Year	Winning skip	Runner up skip	Purse (CAD)
2008	(Ontario) Carrie Lindner	(Ontario) Dale Curtis	$6,000
2009	(Ontario) Julie Hastings	(Ontario) Karen Bell	$6,000
2010	(Ontario) Kathy Brown	(Ontario) Jacqueline Harrison	$9,500
2011	(Ontario) Julie Hastings	(Ontario) Cathy Auld	$9,500
2012	(United States) Erika Brown	(Ontario) Kristy Russell	$15,000
2013	(Ontario) Julie Hastings	(Ontario) Susan McKnight	$15,000
2014	(Ontario) Julie Hastings	(Ontario) Jacqueline Harrison	$12,000
2015	(Ontario) Allison Flaxey	(United States) Erika Brown	$11,900
2016	(Ontario) Sherry Middaugh	(Ontario) Julie Tippin	$10,000
2017	(Ontario) Julie Tippin	(Ontario) Susan Froud	$9,375
2018	(Ontario) Krista McCarville	(Ontario) Jestyn Murphy	$8,400
2019	(South Korea) Gim Un-chi	(Ontario) Megan Balsdon	$11,300
2020	(Ontario) Susan Froud	(Ontario) Maddy Warriner	
2021	(Northwest Territories) Kerry Galusha	(Ontario) Hollie Duncan	$12,625
2022	(Japan) Ikue Kitazawa	(Ontario) Carly Howard	$9,750
2023	(Ontario) Krista McCarville	(Scotland) Rebecca Morrison	$11,800
2024	(Ontario) Breanna Rozon	(South Korea) Kim Eun-jung	$8,500
2025	(Ontario) Hollie Duncan	(Japan) Miku Nihira	$15,000
2026	(Switzerland) Xenia Schwaller	(Ontario) Kira Brunton	$15,000
