= 2013 KW Fall Classic =

World Curling Tour event

- Host city: Waterloo, Ontario
- Arena: Kitchener-Waterloo Granite Club
- Dates: September 26–29
- Men's winner: (Ontario) Scott McDonald
- Skip: Scott McDonald
- Third: Brent Dekoning
- Second: Connor Duhaime
- Lead: Simon Barrick
- Finalist: (Ontario) Jake Walker
- Women's winner: (Ontario) Julie Hastings
- Skip: Julie Hastings
- Third: Cheryl McPherson
- Second: Stacey Smith
- Lead: Katrina Collins
- Finalist: (Ontario) Susan McKnight

The 2013 KW Fall Classic was held from September 26 to 29 at the Kitchener-Waterloo Granite Club in Waterloo, Ontario in 2013–14 World Curling Tour. The men's event was held in a triple knockout format, while the women's event will be held in a round robin format. The purse for the men's event was CAD$8,500, while the purse for the women's event was CAD$15,000.

== Men ==
=== Teams ===
Skip	Third	Second	Lead	Locale
Mike Aprile	Dave Pallen	D. J. Ronaldson	Shawn Cottrill	Listowel, Ontario
Pat Ferris	Andrew Fairfull	Craig Fairfull	Robert Larmer	Grimsby, Ontario
Kevin Flewwelling	Bill Francis	Jeff Grant	Larry Tobin	Toronto, Ontario
Cory Heggestad	Wayne Warren	Scott Borland	Darryl MacKenzie	Barrie, Ontario
Brent Ross (fourth)	Jake Higgs (skip)	Codey Maus	Bill Buchanan	Harriston, Ontario
Rayad Husain	Michael Checca	Jeff Brown	Travis Belchior	Brampton, Ontario
Richard Krell	Chris Lewis	Andrew Dunbar	John Gabel	Kitchener, Ontario
Jason Malcho	George White	Rob Malcho	Mark Monteith	Stratford, Ontario
Scott McDonald	Brent Dekoning	Connor Duhaime	Simon Barrick	London, Ontario
Dennis Moretto	Paul Attard	Joe Miller	Mike Nelson	Ontario
Ryan Myler	Shane Latimer	Kevin Lagerquist	Evan DeViller	Brampton, Ontario
Fraser Reid	Spencer Nuttall	Jack Lindsey	Richard Seto	Waterloo, Ontario
Rob Retchless	Punit Sthankiya	Dave Ellis	Rob Ainsley	Toronto, Ontario
Rob Rumfeldt	Adam Spencer	Scott Hodgson	Scott Howard	Ontario
Aaron Squires	David Easter	Wesley Forget	Jordan Moreau	St. Thomas, Ontario
Jake Walker	Dayna Deruelle	Andrew McGaugh	Michael McGaugh	Brampton, Ontario

=== Knockout results ===
The draw is listed as follows:

==== A event ====
First Knockout		Semifinals		Qualifier 1
(Ontario) Rob Rumfeldt	6
(Ontario) Mike Aprile	4	(Ontario) Rob Rumfeldt	9
(Ontario) Ryan Myler	5	(Ontario) Ryan Myler	2
(Ontario) Rayad Husain	1			(Ontario) Rob Rumfeldt	3
(Ontario) Kevin Flewwelling	5			(Ontario) Fraser Reid	7
(Ontario) Fraser Reid	6	(Ontario) Fraser Reid	6
(Ontario) Jake Walker	5	(Ontario) Jake Walker	2
(Ontario) Jason Malcho	3

First Knockout		Semifinals		Qualifier 2
(Ontario) Jake Higgs	2
(Ontario) Dennis Moretto	8	(Ontario) Dennis Moretto	6
(Ontario) Rob Retchless	5	(Ontario) Richard Krell	2
(Ontario) Richard Krell	7			(Ontario) Dennis Moretto	6
(Ontario) Cory Heggestad	6			(Ontario) Scott McDonald	9
(Ontario) Aaron Squires	5	(Ontario) Cory Heggestad	7
(Ontario) Pat Ferris	6	(Ontario) Scott McDonald	9
(Ontario) Scott McDonald	7

==== B event ====
Second Knockout		Semifinals		Qualifier 3
(Ontario) Mike Aprile	5
(Ontario) Rayad Husain	4	(Ontario) Mike Aprile	5
(Ontario) Kevin Flewwelling	6	(Ontario) Kevin Flewwelling	6
(Ontario) Jason Malcho	3			(Ontario) Kevin Flewwelling	7
				(Ontario) Dennis Moretto	6

Second Knockout		Semifinals		Qualifier 4
(Ontario) Jake Higgs	6
(Ontario) Rob Retchless	7	(Ontario) Rob Retchless	4
(Ontario) Aaron Squires	5	(Ontario) Aaron Squires	6
(Ontario) Pat Ferris	3			(Ontario) Aaron Squires	3
				(Ontario) Rob Rumfeldt	7

Second Knockout		Qualifier 5
(Ontario) Ryan Myler
(Ontario) Jake Walker		(Ontario) Jake Walker	5
(Ontario) Richard Krell	4	(Ontario) Richard Krell	2
(Ontario) Cory Heggestad	3

==== C event ====
Third Knockout		Semifinals		Qualifier 6
(Ontario) Rayad Husain	6
(Ontario) Jason Malcho	3	(Ontario) Rayad Husain	3
		(Ontario) Cory Heggestad	6
				(Ontario) Cory Heggestad	5
				(Ontario) Richard Krell	6

Third Knockout		Semifinals		Qualifier 7
(Ontario) Jake Higgs	2
(Ontario) Pat Ferris	9	(Ontario) Pat Ferris	5
		(Ontario) Ryan Myler	4
				(Ontario) Pat Ferris	1
				(Ontario) Aaron Squires	5

Third Knockout		Qualifier 8
(Ontario) Mike Aprile	1
(Ontario) Rob Retchless	7	(Ontario) Rob Retchless	6
		(Ontario) Dennis Moretto	3

=== Playoffs ===
Quarterfinals
(Ontario) Fraser Reid	3
(Ontario) Richard Krell	4
(Ontario) Jake Walker	7
(Ontario) Rob Retchless	5
(Ontario) Kevin Flewwelling	4
(Ontario) Rob Rumfeldt	5
(Ontario) Scott McDonald	6
(Ontario) Aaron Squires	5

Semifinals
(Ontario) Richard Krell	4
(Ontario) Jake Walker	8
(Ontario) Rob Rumfeldt	3
(Ontario) Scott McDonald	5

Final
(Ontario) Jake Walker	2
(Ontario) Scott McDonald	8

== Women ==
=== Teams ===
Skip	Third	Second	Lead	Locale
Cathy Auld	Janet Murphy	Stephanie Gray	Melissa Foster	Ontario
Marika Bakewell	Jessica Corrado	Stephanie Corrado	Jasmine Thurston	Markdale, Ontario
Chelsea Brandwood	Claire Greenlees	Jordan Brandwood	Danielle Greenlees	Grimsby, Ontario
Chrissy Cadorin	Katie Lindsay	Stephanie Thompson	Lauren Wood	Toronto, Ontario
Allison Flaxey	Katie Pringle	Lynn Kreviazuk	Morgan Court	Listowel, Ontario
Courtney George	Aileen Sormunen	Amanda McLean	Monica Walker	St. Paul, Minnesota
Heather Graham	Margie Hewitt	Amy Balsdon	Abbie Darnley	King, Ontario
Jacqueline Harrison	Kimberly Tuck	Susan Froud	Andra Aldred	Brantford, Ontario
Julie Hastings	Cheryl McPherson	Stacey Smith	Katrina Collins	Thornhill, Ontario
Kendall Haymes	Holly Donaldson	Cassie Savage	Megan Arnold	Kitchener, Ontario
Michèle Jäggi	Marisa Winkelhausen	Stéphanie Jäggi	Melanie Barbezat	Bern, Switzerland
Vicki Marianchuk	Louise Germain	Carolyn Edison	Lynne Corrado	Ontario
Susan McKnight	Catherine Kaino	Karen Rowsell	Joanne Curtis	Uxbridge, Ontario
Sherry Middaugh	Jo-Ann Rizzo	Lee Merklinger	Leigh Armstrong	Coldwater, Ontario
Lindsay Miners	Dawna Premo	Megan St. Amand	Michelle MacLeod	Sault Ste. Marie, Ontario
Allison Pottinger	Nicole Joraanstad	Natalie Nicholson	Tabitha Peterson	Bemidji, Minnesota
Julie Reddick	Carrie Lindner	Megan Balsdon	Laura Hickey	Toronto, Ontario
Kristy Russell	Michelle Gray	Tina Mazerolle	Allison Singh	Elora, Ontario
Jennifer Spencer	Jaimee Gardner	Amanda Gebhardt	Becky Philpott	Guelph, Ontario
Ashley Waye	Mallory Buist	Denise Donovan	Angela Cerantola	Toronto, Ontario

=== Round Robin Standings ===
Final Round Robin Standings

Key
Teams to Playoffs

Pool A	W	L
(Ontario) Julie Hastings	3	1
(Ontario) Cathy Auld	3	1
(Ontario) Heather Graham	3	1
(Ontario) Lindsay Miners	1	3
(Ontario) Jennifer Spencer	0	4

Pool B	W	L
(Ontario) Sherry Middaugh	3	1
(Ontario) Kristy Russell	2	2
(Ontario) Chrissy Cadorin	2	2
(Ontario) Alison Flaxey	2	2
(Ontario) Ashley Waye	1	3

Pool C	W	L
(Ontario) Susan McKnight	3	1
(Switzerland) Michèle Jäggi	3	1
(Ontario) Julie Reddick	3	1
(Ontario) Marika Bakewell	1	3
(Ontario) Chelsea Brandwood	0	4

Pool D	W	L
(Ontario) Jacqueline Harrison	3	1
(Minnesota) Courtney George	3	1
(Minnesota) Allison Pottinger	3	1
(Ontario) Vicki Marianchuk	1	3
(Ontario) Kendall Haymes	0	4

=== Playoffs ===
Quarterfinals
(Ontario) Jacqueline Harrison	6
(Minnesota) Courtney George	0
(Ontario) Susan McKnight	8
(Minnesota) Allison Pottinger	5
(Ontario) Sherry Middaugh	8
(Ontario) Cathy Auld	4
(Ontario) Julie Hastings	7
(Switzerland) Michèle Jäggi	5

Semifinals
(Ontario) Jacqueline Harrison	5
(Ontario) Susan McKnight	8
(Ontario) Sherry Middaugh	4
(Ontario) Julie Hastings	5

Final
(Ontario) Susan McKnight	5
(Ontario) Julie Hastings	8
