= 2025 KW Fall Classic =

- Host city: Waterloo, Ontario
- Arena: KW Granite Club
- Dates: September 18–21
- Men's winner: (Italy) Team Retornaz
- Curling club: Trentino CC, Trentino
- Skip: Joël Retornaz
- Third: Amos Mosaner
- Second: Sebastiano Arman
- Lead: Mattia Giovanella
- Finalist: (Ontario) Jayden King
- Women's winner: (Ontario) Team Duncan
- Curling club: Woodstock CC, Woodstock
- Skip: Hollie Duncan
- Third: Megan Balsdon
- Second: Rachelle Strybosch
- Lead: Tess Guyatt
- Finalist: (Japan) Team Tabata

The 2025 Hogged Rock KW Fall Classic presented by Runback Brewing was held from September 18 to 21 at the KW Granite Club in Waterloo, Ontario. Both events were held in a round robin format with a purse of $18,750 for the men and $15,000 for the women.

== Men ==
=== Teams ===
The teams are listed as follows:

Skip	Third	Second	Lead	Alternate	Locale
Michael Brunner	Anthony Petoud	Romano Keller-Meier	Andreas Gerlach		Bern, Switzerland
Cameron Bryce	Duncan Menzies	Scott Hyslop	Robin McCall		Kinross, Scotland
Alex Champ	Ben Bevan	Matt Pretty	Travis Ackroyd		Toronto, Ontario
Niklas Edin	Oskar Eriksson	Rasmus Wranå	Christoffer Sundgren		Karlstad, Sweden
Pat Ferris	Travis Fanset	Rob Ainsley	Scott Clinton		Grimsby, Ontario
Mike Fournier	Charlie Richard	Punit Sthankiya	Graeme Robson		Toronto, Ontario
Riley Fung-Ernst	Matthew Rowley	Joseph Trieu	Ryan Hastings		Waterloo, Ontario
Mike Harris	Scott Foster	Chad Allen	Jay Allen		Oakville, Ontario
Daniel Hocevar	Zander Elmes	Joel Matthews	Daniel Del Conte		Toronto, Ontario
Philipp Hösli (Fourth)	Marco Hösli (Skip)	Simon Gloor	Justin Hausherr		Glarus, Switzerland
Mark Kean	Brady Lumley	Matthew Garner	Spencer Dunlop		Woodstock, Ontario
Kim Soo-hyuk	Kim Chang-min	Yoo Min-hyeon	Kim Hak-kyun	Jeon Jae-ik	Uiseong, South Korea
Jayden King	Dylan Niepage	Owen Henry	Victor Pietrangelo		London, Ontario
Lukáš Klíma	Marek Černovský	Martin Jurík	Lukáš Klípa	Radek Boháč	Prague, Czech Republic
Jacob Lamb	Daniel Vanveghel	Carter Bryant	Jarrett Matthews		Dundas, Ontario
Lee Jae-beom	Lee Ki-jeong	Kim Min-woo	Kim Jeong-min		Seoul, South Korea
Sandy MacEwan	Dustin Montpellier	Luc Ouimet	Lee Toner		Sudbury, Ontario
Tyler MacTavish	Owen Nicholls	Nathan Kim	Nate Thomas		Waterloo, Ontario
Takumi Maeda	Hiroki Maeda	Uryu Kamikawa	Gakuto Tokoro		Kitami, Japan
Ryan Mayville	Elias Whittington	Joseph Pascucci	Cameron Blair		Milton, Ontario
Jordan McNamara	Colton Daly	Jacob Clarke	Brendan Laframboise		Ottawa, Ontario
Kibo Mulima	Wesley Forget	Ed Cyr	Josh Leung	Wyatt Wright	Waterloo, Ontario
Marc Muskatewitz	Benjamin Kapp	Felix Messenzehl	Johannes Scheuerl	Mario Trevisiol	Füssen, Germany
Joël Retornaz	Amos Mosaner	Sebastiano Arman	Mattia Giovanella		Trentino, Italy
Yves Stocker	Kim Schwaller	Marco Hefti	Felix Eberhard		Zug, Switzerland

=== Round robin standings ===
Final Round Robin Standings

Key
Teams to Playoffs

Pool A	W	L
(Ontario) Jayden King	3	1
(Switzerland) Marco Hösli	3	1
(Ontario) Mark Kean	2	2
(Ontario) Sandy MacEwan	2	2
(Ontario) Jacob Lamb	0	4

Pool B	W	L
(Switzerland) Yves Stocker	4	0
(Germany) Marc Muskatewitz	3	1
(South Korea) Lee Jae-beom	2	2
(Ontario) Jordan McNamara	1	3
(Ontario) Riley Fung-Ernst	0	4

Pool C	W	L
(Italy) Joël Retornaz	4	0
(Ontario) Tyler MacTavish	3	1
(Ontario) Daniel Hocevar	1	3
(Japan) Takumi Maeda	1	3
(Ontario) Kibo Mulima	1	3

Pool D	W	L
(Sweden) Niklas Edin	4	0
(South Korea) Kim Soo-hyuk	3	1
(Ontario) Pat Ferris	2	2
(Scotland) Cameron Bryce	1	3
(Ontario) Mike Harris	0	4

Pool E	W	L
(Czech Republic) Lukáš Klíma	4	0
(Switzerland) Michael Brunner	3	1
(Ontario) Alex Champ	2	2
(Ontario) Mike Fournier	1	3
(Ontario) Ryan Mayville	0	4

=== Round robin results ===
All draw times are listed in Eastern Time (UTC−04:00).

==== Draw 1 ====
Thursday, September 18, 9:00 am

Sheet 1	1	2	3	4	5	6	7	8	Final
(Italy) Joël Retornaz 🔨	2	1	0	4	0	3	X	X	10
(Japan) Takumi Maeda	0	0	1	0	1	0	X	X	2

Sheet 2	1	2	3	4	5	6	7	8	Final
(Germany) Marc Muskatewitz 🔨	2	1	0	0	1	0	0	2	6
(South Korea) Lee Jae-beom	0	0	2	1	0	2	0	0	5

Sheet 3	1	2	3	4	5	6	7	8	Final
(Ontario) Jayden King 🔨	2	2	2	0	1	2	X	X	9
(Ontario) Jacob Lamb	0	0	0	2	0	0	X	X	2

Sheet 4	1	2	3	4	5	6	7	8	Final
(Switzerland) Yves Stocker 🔨	5	5	0	2	X	X	X	X	12
(Ontario) Riley Fung-Ernst	0	0	1	0	X	X	X	X	1

Sheet 5	1	2	3	4	5	6	7	8	Final
(Switzerland) Marco Hösli	0	2	0	1	0	4	0	1	8
(Ontario) Mark Kean 🔨	2	0	2	0	2	0	1	0	7

Sheet 6	1	2	3	4	5	6	7	8	Final
(Ontario) Daniel Hocevar 🔨	1	0	0	0	0	2	0	1	4
(Ontario) Tyler MacTavish	0	1	1	1	1	0	2	0	6

==== Draw 2 ====
Thursday, September 18, 11:30 am

Sheet 1	1	2	3	4	5	6	7	8	Final
(Switzerland) Michael Brunner	0	2	0	3	0	0	1	0	6
(Czech Republic) Lukáš Klíma 🔨	1	0	1	0	2	1	0	2	7

Sheet 6	1	2	3	4	5	6	7	8	Final
(Sweden) Niklas Edin	0	1	3	0	4	X	X	X	8
(Scotland) Cameron Bryce 🔨	1	0	0	1	0	X	X	X	2

==== Draw 3 ====
Thursday, September 18, 2:30 pm

Sheet 1	1	2	3	4	5	6	7	8	Final
(South Korea) Kim Soo-hyuk 🔨	2	0	0	1	1	0	2	0	6
(Ontario) Mike Harris	0	1	1	0	0	1	0	1	4

Sheet 2	1	2	3	4	5	6	7	8	Final
(Japan) Takumi Maeda 🔨	2	0	0	1	0	2	1	X	6
(Ontario) Tyler MacTavish	0	3	1	0	5	0	0	X	9

Sheet 3	1	2	3	4	5	6	7	8	Final
(Italy) Joël Retornaz 🔨	2	0	4	0	0	0	2	X	8
(Ontario) Kibo Mulima	0	1	0	2	1	1	0	X	5

Sheet 4	1	2	3	4	5	6	7	8	Final
(Ontario) Mark Kean	1	0	3	0	0	0	1	X	5
(Ontario) Jacob Lamb 🔨	0	1	0	1	0	0	0	X	2

Sheet 5	1	2	3	4	5	6	7	8	Final
(South Korea) Lee Jae-beom	1	0	1	0	2	1	0	2	7
(Ontario) Riley Fung-Ernst 🔨	0	1	0	1	0	0	4	0	6

Sheet 6	1	2	3	4	5	6	7	8	Final
(Ontario) Mike Fournier	2	3	1	0	3	0	X	X	9
(Ontario) Ryan Mayville 🔨	0	0	0	3	0	1	X	X	4

==== Draw 4 ====
Thursday, September 18, 5:00 pm

Sheet 1	1	2	3	4	5	6	7	8	Final
(Switzerland) Marco Hösli 🔨	3	0	1	1	1	0	X	X	6
(Ontario) Sandy MacEwan	0	1	0	0	0	1	X	X	2

Sheet 6	1	2	3	4	5	6	7	8	Final
(Germany) Marc Muskatewitz 🔨	0	0	2	2	4	X	X	X	8
(Ontario) Jordan McNamara	1	0	0	0	0	X	X	X	1

==== Draw 5 ====
Thursday, September 18, 8:00 pm

Sheet 3	1	2	3	4	5	6	7	8	Final
(Scotland) Cameron Bryce 🔨	2	2	0	0	2	0	0	0	6
(Ontario) Mike Harris	0	0	2	0	0	1	1	1	5

Sheet 4	1	2	3	4	5	6	7	8	Final
(Sweden) Niklas Edin 🔨	2	0	2	0	2	2	X	X	8
(Ontario) Pat Ferris	0	2	0	1	0	0	X	X	3

==== Draw 6 ====
Friday, September 19, 9:00 am

Sheet 3	1	2	3	4	5	6	7	8	Final
(Czech Republic) Lukáš Klíma 🔨	1	0	0	5	0	1	3	X	10
(Ontario) Ryan Mayville	0	1	1	0	1	0	0	X	3

Sheet 6	1	2	3	4	5	6	7	8	Final
(Switzerland) Michael Brunner	2	0	0	3	2	1	X	X	8
(Ontario) Alex Champ 🔨	0	2	0	0	0	0	X	X	2

==== Draw 7 ====
Friday, September 19, 11:30 am

Sheet 1	1	2	3	4	5	6	7	8	Final
(Germany) Marc Muskatewitz 🔨	0	0	0	2	0	4	1	X	7
(Ontario) Riley Fung-Ernst	0	0	1	0	2	0	0	X	3

Sheet 2	1	2	3	4	5	6	7	8	Final
(Switzerland) Marco Hösli 🔨	0	1	2	0	3	0	X	X	6
(Ontario) Jacob Lamb	0	0	0	1	0	1	X	X	2

Sheet 3	1	2	3	4	5	6	7	8	Final
(Switzerland) Yves Stocker	1	1	0	2	2	0	X	X	6
(Ontario) Jordan McNamara 🔨	0	0	1	0	0	1	X	X	2

Sheet 4	1	2	3	4	5	6	7	8	Final
(Ontario) Daniel Hocevar 🔨	2	0	1	0	0	1	0	0	4
(Ontario) Kibo Mulima	0	1	0	2	2	0	1	1	7

Sheet 5	1	2	3	4	5	6	7	8	Final
(Italy) Joël Retornaz 🔨	2	0	0	3	3	1	X	X	9
(Ontario) Tyler MacTavish	0	0	1	0	0	0	X	X	1

Sheet 6	1	2	3	4	5	6	7	8	Final
(Ontario) Jayden King 🔨	0	0	0	3	0	2	0	0	5
(Ontario) Sandy MacEwan	0	1	1	0	2	0	1	1	6

==== Draw 8 ====
Friday, September 19, 2:30 pm

Sheet 2	1	2	3	4	5	6	7	8	Final
(Sweden) Niklas Edin 🔨	1	1	0	3	1	0	0	1	7
(Ontario) Mike Harris	0	0	1	0	0	2	1	0	4

Sheet 5	1	2	3	4	5	6	7	8	Final
(South Korea) Kim Soo-hyuk 🔨	2	1	0	3	0	2	1	X	9
(Ontario) Pat Ferris	0	0	3	0	2	0	0	X	5

==== Draw 9 ====
Friday, September 19, 5:00 pm

Sheet 2	1	2	3	4	5	6	7	8	Final
(Switzerland) Michael Brunner	2	2	1	3	X	X	X	X	8
(Ontario) Ryan Mayville 🔨	0	0	0	0	X	X	X	X	0

Sheet 5	1	2	3	4	5	6	7	8	Final
(Ontario) Mike Fournier 🔨	0	2	1	0	2	0	0	X	5
(Ontario) Alex Champ	2	0	0	3	0	2	4	X	11

==== Draw 10 ====
Friday, September 19, 8:00 pm

Sheet 3	1	2	3	4	5	6	7	8	Final
(Ontario) Mark Kean 🔨	0	3	1	0	1	1	0	X	6
(Ontario) Sandy MacEwan	2	0	0	1	0	0	1	X	4

Sheet 4	1	2	3	4	5	6	7	8	Final
(Switzerland) Marco Hösli	0	0	0	0	2	0	1	X	3
(Ontario) Jayden King 🔨	0	4	0	1	0	1	0	X	6

==== Draw 11 ====
Friday, September 19, 10:30 pm

Sheet 1	1	2	3	4	5	6	7	8	Final
(Scotland) Cameron Bryce 🔨	1	0	2	0	0	2	0	X	5
(Ontario) Pat Ferris	0	2	0	1	1	0	4	X	8

Sheet 2	1	2	3	4	5	6	7	8	Final
(Italy) Joël Retornaz	0	1	0	3	2	2	X	X	8
(Ontario) Daniel Hocevar 🔨	1	0	2	0	0	0	X	X	3

Sheet 3	1	2	3	4	5	6	7	8	9	Final
(Sweden) Niklas Edin	1	0	0	2	1	0	2	0	1	7
(South Korea) Kim Soo-hyuk 🔨	0	1	3	0	0	1	0	1	0	6

Sheet 4	1	2	3	4	5	6	7	8	Final
(South Korea) Lee Jae-beom 🔨	0	2	1	0	0	2	0	0	5
(Ontario) Jordan McNamara	1	0	0	1	0	0	0	1	3

Sheet 5	1	2	3	4	5	6	7	8	Final
(Germany) Marc Muskatewitz 🔨	0	2	0	1	0	0	0	X	3
(Switzerland) Yves Stocker	1	0	3	0	0	3	0	X	7

Sheet 6	1	2	3	4	5	6	7	8	Final
(Japan) Takumi Maeda 🔨	0	1	2	0	5	0	2	X	10
(Ontario) Kibo Mulima	2	0	0	2	0	1	0	X	5

==== Draw 12 ====
Saturday, September 20, 9:00 am

Sheet 3	1	2	3	4	5	6	7	8	Final
(Switzerland) Michael Brunner	2	1	4	X	X	X	X	X	7
(Ontario) Mike Fournier 🔨	0	0	0	X	X	X	X	X	0

Sheet 4	1	2	3	4	5	6	7	8	Final
(Czech Republic) Lukáš Klíma 🔨	2	0	2	1	0	0	2	X	7
(Ontario) Alex Champ	0	1	0	0	1	1	0	X	3

==== Draw 13 ====
Saturday, September 20, 11:30 am

Sheet 2	1	2	3	4	5	6	7	8	Final
(Ontario) Mark Kean	1	0	0	1	1	0	0	X	3
(Ontario) Jayden King 🔨	0	2	1	0	0	2	2	X	7

Sheet 5	1	2	3	4	5	6	7	8	Final
(Ontario) Jacob Lamb	0	0	1	0	0	3	0	0	4
(Ontario) Sandy MacEwan 🔨	0	1	0	1	2	0	2	1	7

==== Draw 14 ====
Saturday, September 20, 2:30 pm

Sheet 1	1	2	3	4	5	6	7	8	Final
(Switzerland) Yves Stocker 🔨	1	0	2	0	0	4	1	X	8
(South Korea) Lee Jae-beom	0	2	0	2	1	0	0	X	5

Sheet 2	1	2	3	4	5	6	7	8	Final
(Ontario) Jordan McNamara	0	2	4	0	6	X	X	X	12
(Ontario) Riley Fung-Ernst 🔨	1	0	0	2	0	X	X	X	3

==== Draw 15 ====
Saturday, September 20, 5:00 pm

Sheet 1	1	2	3	4	5	6	7	8	Final
(Ontario) Alex Champ	3	2	1	0	2	1	X	X	9
(Ontario) Ryan Mayville 🔨	0	0	0	2	0	0	X	X	2

Sheet 2	1	2	3	4	5	6	7	8	Final
(Czech Republic) Lukáš Klíma	0	2	2	1	0	0	X	X	5
(Ontario) Mike Fournier 🔨	3	0	0	0	0	0	X	X	3

Sheet 3	1	2	3	4	5	6	7	8	Final
(Ontario) Tyler MacTavish 🔨	1	0	2	0	2	0	2	X	7
(Ontario) Kibo Mulima	0	1	0	2	0	2	0	X	5

Sheet 4	1	2	3	4	5	6	7	8	Final
(Scotland) Cameron Bryce 🔨	1	0	1	0	0	X	X	X	2
(South Korea) Kim Soo-hyuk	0	5	0	1	3	X	X	X	9

Sheet 5	1	2	3	4	5	6	7	8	9	Final
(Japan) Takumi Maeda	0	0	0	1	0	0	1	1	0	3
(Ontario) Daniel Hocevar 🔨	0	1	0	0	1	1	0	0	1	4

Sheet 6	1	2	3	4	5	6	7	8	Final
(Ontario) Pat Ferris	2	0	2	2	0	2	X	X	8
(Ontario) Mike Harris 🔨	0	1	0	0	2	0	X	X	3

=== Playoffs ===
Qualification
8	(Switzerland) Marco Hösli	9
9	(Switzerland) Michael Brunner	6
7	(South Korea) Kim Soo-hyuk	6
10	(Ontario) Tyler MacTavish	5

Quarterfinals
1	(Sweden) Niklas Edin	5
8	(Switzerland) Marco Hösli	4
4	(Switzerland) Yves Stocker	4
5	(Ontario) Jayden King	7
2	(Italy) Joël Retornaz	9
7	(South Korea) Kim Soo-hyuk	4
3	(Czech Republic) Lukáš Klíma	5
6	(Germany) Marc Muskatewitz	8

Semifinals
1	(Sweden) Niklas Edin	3
5	(Ontario) Jayden King	6
2	(Italy) Joël Retornaz	9
6	(Germany) Marc Muskatewitz	3

Final
5	(Ontario) Jayden King	4
2	(Italy) Joël Retornaz	7

==== Qualification ====
Saturday, September 20, 8:00 pm

Sheet 1	1	2	3	4	5	6	7	8	Final
(Switzerland) Marco Hösli	0	3	3	0	2	0	1	X	9
(Switzerland) Michael Brunner 🔨	2	0	0	2	0	2	0	X	6

Sheet 6	1	2	3	4	5	6	7	8	Final
(South Korea) Kim Soo-hyuk	0	2	0	0	2	1	1	0	6
(Ontario) Tyler MacTavish 🔨	2	0	1	1	0	0	0	1	5

==== Quarterfinals ====
Sunday, September 21, 9:00 am

Sheet 2	1	2	3	4	5	6	7	8	Final
(Sweden) Niklas Edin 🔨	2	0	1	0	1	0	1	0	5
(Switzerland) Marco Hösli	0	1	0	1	0	0	0	2	4

Sheet 3	1	2	3	4	5	6	7	8	Final
(Italy) Joël Retornaz 🔨	2	1	1	0	3	0	2	X	9
(South Korea) Kim Soo-hyuk	0	0	0	2	0	2	0	X	4

Sheet 4	1	2	3	4	5	6	7	8	Final
(Czech Republic) Lukáš Klíma 🔨	3	0	0	1	0	1	0	0	5
(Germany) Marc Muskatewitz	0	2	0	0	2	0	3	1	8

Sheet 5	1	2	3	4	5	6	7	8	Final
(Switzerland) Yves Stocker 🔨	0	1	0	1	0	2	0	X	4
(Ontario) Jayden King	1	0	1	0	3	0	2	X	7

==== Semifinals ====
Sunday, September 22, 12:00 pm

Sheet 4	1	2	3	4	5	6	7	8	Final
(Sweden) Niklas Edin 🔨	0	0	2	0	0	1	0	0	3
(Ontario) Jayden King	1	1	0	0	2	0	1	1	6

Sheet 5	1	2	3	4	5	6	7	8	Final
(Italy) Joël Retornaz 🔨	4	0	2	3	X	X	X	X	9
(Germany) Marc Muskatewitz	0	3	0	0	X	X	X	X	3

==== Final ====
Sunday, September 22, 3:00 pm

Sheet 2	1	2	3	4	5	6	7	8	Final
(Ontario) Jayden King	0	1	0	2	0	1	X	X	4
(Italy) Joël Retornaz 🔨	2	0	1	0	4	0	X	X	7

== Women ==
=== Teams ===
The teams are listed as follows:

Skip	Third	Second	Lead	Alternate	Locale
Hailey Armstrong	Grace Lloyd	Michaela Robert	Rachel Steele	Grace Cave	Whitby, Ontario
Emma Artichuk	Jamie Smith	Evelyn Robert	Lauren Rajala		Waterloo, Ontario
Krysta Burns	Maddy Warriner	Sara Guy	Laura Masters		Sudbury, Ontario
Elizabeth Cousins	Annmarie Dubberstein	Allison Howell	Elizabeth Janiak		(United States) Nashua, New Hampshire
Abby Deschene	Mackenzie Daley	Mia Toner	Emma Acres		North Bay, Ontario
Robyn Despins	Nicole Westlund-Stewart	Samantha Morris	Rebecca Carr		Thunder Bay, Ontario
Kathleen Dubberstein	Leilani Dubberstein	Jessica Byers	Lindsey Schmalz		Manila, Philippines
Hollie Duncan	Megan Balsdon	Rachelle Strybosch	Tess Guyatt		Woodstock, Ontario
Katie Ford	Emily Middaugh	Madison Fisher	Tori Zemmelink		Waterloo, Ontario
Amanda Gebhardt	Allison Singh	Erin Cook	Hilary Huddleston		Listowel, Ontario
Gim Eun-ji	Kim Min-ji	Kim Su-ji	Seol Ye-eun	Seol Ye-ji	Uijeongbu, South Korea
Ha Seung-youn	Kim Hye-rin	Yang Tae-i	Kim Su-jin	Park Seo-jin	Chuncheon, South Korea
Anna Hasselborg	Sara McManus	Agnes Knochenhauer	Sofia Mabergs	Johanna Heldin	Sundbyberg, Sweden
Carly Howard	Grace Holyoke	Stephanie Mumford	Alice Holyoke		Toronto, Ontario
Danielle Inglis	Kira Brunton	Calissa Daly	Cassandra de Groot	Kim Tuck	Ottawa, Ontario
Ikue Kitazawa	Seina Nakajima	Minori Suzuki	Hasumi Ishigooka		Nagano, Japan
Sherry Middaugh	Karri-Lee Grant	Melissa Foster	Jane Hooper-Perroud		Barrie, Ontario
Breanna Rozon	Chrissy Cadorin	Stephanie Thompson	Leigh Armstrong		Oshawa, Ontario
Laurie St-Georges	Sarah Daniels	Émilia Gagné	Emily Riley		Laval, Quebec
Momoha Tabata (Fourth)	Miku Nihira (Skip) (Note: Miku Nihira skipped Team Tabata.)	Sae Yamamoto	Mikoto Nakajima		Sapporo, Japan

=== Round robin standings ===
Final Round Robin Standings

Key
Teams to Playoffs

Pool A	W	L
(Sweden) Anna Hasselborg	4	0
(Quebec) Laurie St-Georges	3	1
(Ontario) Emma Artichuk	2	2
(Ontario) Robyn Despins	1	3
(Ontario) Abby Deschene	0	4

Pool B	W	L
(South Korea) Gim Eun-ji	3	1
(Ontario) Katie Ford	3	1
(Ontario) Breanna Rozon	2	2
(United States) Elizabeth Cousins	2	2
(Philippines) Kathleen Dubberstein	0	4

Pool C	W	L
(Ontario) Danielle Inglis	3	1
(Ontario) Hollie Duncan	3	1
(Japan) Team Tabata	3	1
(Ontario) Krysta Burns	1	3
(Ontario) Amanda Gebhardt	0	4

Pool D	W	L
(South Korea) Ha Seung-youn	3	1
(Ontario) Hailey Armstrong	3	1
(Ontario) Carly Howard	2	2
(Japan) Ikue Kitazawa	2	2
(Ontario) Sherry Middaugh	0	4

=== Round robin results ===
All draw times are listed in Eastern Time (UTC−04:00).

==== Draw 2 ====
Thursday, September 18, 11:30 am

Sheet 2	1	2	3	4	5	6	7	8	Final
(South Korea) Ha Seung-youn 🔨	0	1	0	3	0	0	0	1	5
(Japan) Ikue Kitazawa	1	0	1	0	1	0	1	0	4

Sheet 3	1	2	3	4	5	6	7	8	Final
(Japan) Team Tabata	0	0	2	0	2	2	0	0	6
(Ontario) Danielle Inglis 🔨	0	4	0	1	0	0	1	1	7

Sheet 4	1	2	3	4	5	6	7	8	Final
(South Korea) Gim Eun-ji	0	0	1	0	1	0	0	X	2
(United States) Elizabeth Cousins 🔨	0	2	0	1	0	1	1	X	5

Sheet 5	1	2	3	4	5	6	7	8	Final
(Sweden) Anna Hasselborg	2	1	0	0	1	1	1	X	6
(Ontario) Emma Artichuk 🔨	0	0	2	2	0	0	0	X	4

==== Draw 4 ====
Thursday, September 18, 5:00 pm

Sheet 2	1	2	3	4	5	6	7	8	Final
(Ontario) Hailey Armstrong	0	2	0	0	3	2	0	1	8
(Ontario) Sherry Middaugh 🔨	4	0	0	1	0	0	1	0	6

Sheet 3	1	2	3	4	5	6	7	8	Final
(Ontario) Hollie Duncan 🔨	0	2	3	1	0	2	X	X	8
(Ontario) Amanda Gebhardt	1	0	0	0	2	0	X	X	3

Sheet 4	1	2	3	4	5	6	7	8	Final
(Ontario) Breanna Rozon	0	1	0	0	4	0	1	1	7
(Philippines) Kathleen Dubberstein 🔨	1	0	1	3	0	1	0	0	6

Sheet 5	1	2	3	4	5	6	7	8	Final
(Quebec) Laurie St-Georges 🔨	1	2	1	0	2	0	2	X	8
(Ontario) Abby Deschene	0	0	0	1	0	1	0	X	2

==== Draw 5 ====
Thursday, September 18, 8:00 pm

Sheet 1	1	2	3	4	5	6	7	8	Final
(Sweden) Anna Hasselborg	1	0	0	2	0	3	1	X	7
(Ontario) Robyn Despins 🔨	0	1	0	0	1	0	0	X	2

Sheet 2	1	2	3	4	5	6	7	8	Final
(South Korea) Gim Eun-ji 🔨	0	0	2	0	2	2	0	0	6
(Ontario) Katie Ford	0	1	0	1	0	0	1	2	5

Sheet 5	1	2	3	4	5	6	7	8	Final
(Japan) Team Tabata 🔨	3	0	3	0	0	1	0	X	7
(Ontario) Krysta Burns	0	1	0	1	1	0	1	X	4

Sheet 6	1	2	3	4	5	6	7	8	Final
(South Korea) Ha Seung-youn 🔨	0	2	2	2	X	X	X	X	6
(Ontario) Carly Howard	0	0	0	0	X	X	X	X	0

==== Draw 6 ====
Friday, September 19, 9:00 am

Sheet 1	1	2	3	4	5	6	7	8	Final
(Ontario) Emma Artichuk 🔨	2	0	0	0	2	1	0	X	5
(Ontario) Abby Deschene	0	0	0	1	0	0	1	X	2

Sheet 2	1	2	3	4	5	6	7	8	Final
(United States) Elizabeth Cousins 🔨	3	0	1	0	5	2	X	X	11
(Philippines) Kathleen Dubberstein	0	1	0	1	0	0	X	X	2

Sheet 4	1	2	3	4	5	6	7	8	Final
(Ontario) Danielle Inglis 🔨	1	0	0	1	1	1	0	1	5
(Ontario) Amanda Gebhardt	0	1	1	0	0	0	0	0	2

Sheet 5	1	2	3	4	5	6	7	8	Final
(Japan) Ikue Kitazawa 🔨	2	2	3	0	3	X	X	X	10
(Ontario) Sherry Middaugh	0	0	0	2	0	X	X	X	2

==== Draw 8 ====
Friday, September 19, 2:30 pm

Sheet 1	1	2	3	4	5	6	7	8	9	Final
(Ontario) Breanna Rozon 🔨	0	0	1	0	2	0	1	1	0	5
(Ontario) Katie Ford	1	1	0	2	0	1	0	0	1	6

Sheet 3	1	2	3	4	5	6	7	8	Final
(Ontario) Hailey Armstrong 🔨	1	0	0	2	1	0	2	X	6
(Ontario) Carly Howard	0	1	1	0	0	1	0	X	3

Sheet 4	1	2	3	4	5	6	7	8	Final
(Quebec) Laurie St-Georges 🔨	1	0	0	0	0	1	0	2	4
(Ontario) Robyn Despins	0	0	1	1	0	0	1	0	3

Sheet 6	1	2	3	4	5	6	7	8	Final
(Ontario) Hollie Duncan	0	3	1	0	0	2	0	X	6
(Ontario) Krysta Burns 🔨	1	0	0	1	0	0	1	X	3

==== Draw 9 ====
Friday, September 19, 5:00 pm

Sheet 1	1	2	3	4	5	6	7	8	Final
(South Korea) Gim Eun-ji 🔨	0	2	3	2	2	0	X	X	9
(Philippines) Kathleen Dubberstein	2	0	0	0	0	2	X	X	4

Sheet 3	1	2	3	4	5	6	7	8	Final
(South Korea) Ha Seung-youn 🔨	5	0	3	0	2	X	X	X	10
(Ontario) Sherry Middaugh	0	1	0	3	0	X	X	X	4

Sheet 4	1	2	3	4	5	6	7	8	Final
(Sweden) Anna Hasselborg 🔨	1	1	0	2	0	3	1	X	8
(Ontario) Abby Deschene	0	0	2	0	1	0	0	X	3

Sheet 6	1	2	3	4	5	6	7	8	Final
(Japan) Team Tabata	0	1	2	0	2	0	2	X	7
(Ontario) Amanda Gebhardt 🔨	1	0	0	1	0	2	0	X	4

==== Draw 10 ====
Friday, September 19, 8:00 pm

Sheet 1	1	2	3	4	5	6	7	8	9	Final
(Japan) Ikue Kitazawa	1	1	1	2	0	0	0	3	0	8
(Ontario) Carly Howard 🔨	0	0	0	0	4	3	1	0	1	9

Sheet 2	1	2	3	4	5	6	7	8	Final
(Ontario) Danielle Inglis 🔨	2	1	0	0	0	1	1	2	7
(Ontario) Krysta Burns	0	0	2	1	1	0	0	0	4

Sheet 5	1	2	3	4	5	6	7	8	Final
(United States) Elizabeth Cousins	0	2	0	0	0	1	1	0	4
(Ontario) Katie Ford 🔨	1	0	1	1	1	0	0	2	6

Sheet 6	1	2	3	4	5	6	7	8	Final
(Ontario) Emma Artichuk 🔨	2	1	0	3	0	4	X	X	10
(Ontario) Robyn Despins	0	0	2	0	1	0	X	X	3

==== Draw 12 ====
Saturday, September 20, 9:00 am

Sheet 1	1	2	3	4	5	6	7	8	Final
(South Korea) Ha Seung-youn	0	0	0	1	0	0	0	X	1
(Ontario) Hailey Armstrong 🔨	0	0	2	0	1	2	1	X	6

Sheet 2	1	2	3	4	5	6	7	8	Final
(Japan) Team Tabata	0	0	1	0	4	0	2	2	9
(Ontario) Hollie Duncan 🔨	2	1	0	2	0	1	0	0	6

Sheet 5	1	2	3	4	5	6	7	8	Final
(South Korea) Gim Eun-ji	3	0	2	0	3	X	X	X	8
(Ontario) Breanna Rozon 🔨	0	1	0	1	0	X	X	X	2

Sheet 6	1	2	3	4	5	6	7	8	Final
(Sweden) Anna Hasselborg 🔨	1	0	3	0	0	2	0	X	6
(Quebec) Laurie St-Georges	0	1	0	0	2	0	1	X	4

==== Draw 13 ====
Saturday, September 20, 11:30 am

Sheet 1	1	2	3	4	5	6	7	8	Final
(Ontario) Krysta Burns	0	5	1	1	X	X	X	X	7
(Ontario) Amanda Gebhardt 🔨	1	0	0	0	X	X	X	X	1

Sheet 3	1	2	3	4	5	6	7	8	Final
(Ontario) Robyn Despins	0	2	1	0	2	0	3	0	8
(Ontario) Abby Deschene 🔨	1	0	0	2	0	2	0	2	7

Sheet 4	1	2	3	4	5	6	7	8	Final
(Ontario) Carly Howard	0	1	1	0	0	1	0	3	6
(Ontario) Sherry Middaugh 🔨	1	0	0	1	1	0	1	0	4

Sheet 6	1	2	3	4	5	6	7	8	Final
(Ontario) Katie Ford	1	1	0	0	2	2	1	X	7
(Philippines) Kathleen Dubberstein 🔨	0	0	2	1	0	0	0	X	3

==== Draw 14 ====
Saturday, September 20, 2:30 pm

Sheet 3	1	2	3	4	5	6	7	8	Final
(Ontario) Emma Artichuk	3	0	1	0	0	2	1	0	7
(Quebec) Laurie St-Georges 🔨	0	1	0	3	1	0	0	3	8

Sheet 4	1	2	3	4	5	6	7	8	Final
(Japan) Ikue Kitazawa 🔨	1	1	0	2	3	X	X	X	7
(Ontario) Hailey Armstrong	0	0	1	0	0	X	X	X	1

Sheet 5	1	2	3	4	5	6	7	8	Final
(Ontario) Danielle Inglis	0	0	0	1	0	X	X	X	1
(Ontario) Hollie Duncan 🔨	2	1	2	0	6	X	X	X	11

Sheet 6	1	2	3	4	5	6	7	8	Final
(United States) Elizabeth Cousins	0	0	2	0	1	0	1	0	4
(Ontario) Breanna Rozon 🔨	0	2	0	2	0	1	0	2	7

=== Playoffs ===
Quarterfinals
1	(Sweden) Anna Hasselborg	2
8	(South Korea) Gim Eun-ji	7
4	(Ontario) Danielle Inglis	4
5	(Ontario) Hollie Duncan	6
2	(Quebec) Laurie St-Georges	8
7	(Ontario) Hailey Armstrong	4
3	(South Korea) Ha Seung-youn	2
6	(Japan) Team Tabata	3

Semifinals
8	(South Korea) Gim Eun-ji	4
5	(Ontario) Hollie Duncan	6
2	(Quebec) Laurie St-Georges	1
6	(Japan) Team Tabata	6

Final
5	(Ontario) Hollie Duncan	5
6	(Japan) Team Tabata	2

==== Quarterfinals ====
Saturday, September 20, 8:00 pm

Sheet 2	1	2	3	4	5	6	7	8	Final
(Ontario) Danielle Inglis 🔨	1	0	0	0	2	1	0	X	4
(Ontario) Hollie Duncan	0	1	1	2	0	0	2	X	6

Sheet 3	1	2	3	4	5	6	7	8	Final
(South Korea) Ha Seung-youn	0	0	0	0	2	0	0	0	2
(Japan) Team Tabata 🔨	0	1	0	1	0	0	0	1	3

Sheet 4	1	2	3	4	5	6	7	8	Final
(Quebec) Laurie St-Georges 🔨	0	1	1	0	2	3	1	X	8
(Ontario) Hailey Armstrong	3	0	0	1	0	0	0	X	4

Sheet 5	1	2	3	4	5	6	7	8	Final
(Sweden) Anna Hasselborg 🔨	0	0	1	0	1	0	0	X	2
(South Korea) Gim Eun-ji	0	0	0	2	0	3	2	X	7

==== Semifinals ====
Sunday, September 22, 12:00 pm

Sheet 2	1	2	3	4	5	6	7	8	Final
(Quebec) Laurie St-Georges 🔨	0	0	0	0	1	X	X	X	1
(Japan) Team Tabata	1	2	2	1	0	X	X	X	6

Sheet 3	1	2	3	4	5	6	7	8	Final
(South Korea) Gim Eun-ji	1	0	0	2	0	1	0	0	4
(Ontario) Hollie Duncan 🔨	0	0	2	0	1	0	2	1	6

==== Final ====
Sunday, September 22, 3:00 pm

Sheet 5	1	2	3	4	5	6	7	8	Final
(Ontario) Hollie Duncan 🔨	0	0	0	2	0	2	1	X	5
(Japan) Team Tabata	0	1	0	0	1	0	0	X	2
