= 2017 KW Fall Classic =

- Host city: Waterloo, Ontario
- Arena: Kitchener-Waterloo Granite Club
- Dates: September 21–24
- Men's winner: (Ontario) Matthew Hall
- Curling club: Westmount G&CC, Kitchener, Ontario
- Skip: Matthew Hall
- Third: Jeff Wanless
- Second: Joey Hart
- Lead: David Hart
- Finalist: (Ontario) Rob Retchless
- Women's winner: (Ontario) Julie Tippin
- Curling club: Woodstock CC, Woodstock, Ontario
- Skip: Julie Tippin
- Third: Chantal Duhaime
- Second: Rachelle Vink
- Lead: Tess Bobbie
- Finalist: (Ontario) Susan Froud

The 2017 KW Fall Classic was held from September 21 to 24 at the Kitchener-Waterloo Granite Club in Waterloo, Ontario as part of the 2017-18 World Curling Tour. The men's event was a triple knockout format, while the women's event was held in a round robin format.

== Men ==
=== Teams ===
Skip	Third	Second	Lead	Locale
Rob Ainsley	David MacMurdo	Devon Martin	Evan DeViller	Toronto, Ontario
Jordan Chandler	Sandy MacEwan	Luc Ouimet	Lee Toner	Sudbury, Ontario
Ian Dickie	Tyler Stewart	Zack Shurtleff	Hugh Murphy	Newmarket, Ontario
Connor Duhaime	Owen Duhaime	Andrew Tournay	Mike Aprile	Barrie, Ontario
Andrew Fairfull	Matt Lowe	Craig Fairfull	Punit Sthankiya	Guelph, Ontario
Brent Gray	Ben Shane	John Gabel	Kyle Forster	Waterloo, Ontario
Matthew Hall	Jeff Wanless	Joey Hart	David Hart	Waterloo, Ontario
Tanner Horgan	Jacob Horgan	Nicholas Bissonnette	Maxime Blais	Sudbury, Ontario
Kim Chang-min	Seong Se-hyeon	Oh Eun-soo	Lee Ki-bok	Uiseong, South Korea
Richard Krell	Evan Lilly	Jonah Mondloch	Robert Currie	Waterloo, Ontario
Rob Lobel	Steven Lobel	Joey Rettinger	Ted Anderson	Toronto, Ontario
David Misun	Patrik Kapralik	Juraj Gallo	Jakub Polak	Martin, Slovakia
Yusuke Morozumi	Tetsuro Shimizu	Tsuyoshi Yamaguchi	Kosuke Morozumi	Karuizawa, Japan
Greg Park	Rob Fry	Michael Foster	Chris Lovell	Toronto, Ontario
Rob Retchless	Alex Champ	Terry Arnold	Scott Clinton	Toronto, Ontario
Daryl Shane	Chris Ciasnocha	Dylan Tippin	Shawn Cottrill	Listowel, Ontario
Brandon Tippin	Jason Whitehill	Graeme Robson	Tim Cornfield	Owen Sound, Ontario
Zou Dejia	Zou Qiang	Xu Jingtao	Shao Zhilin	Harbin, China

=== Knockout results ===
The draw is listed as follows:

==== A event ====
Round of 16
(Slovakia) David Misun	2
(China) Zou Dejia	6
(Ontario) Matthew Hall	5
(Ontario) Brent Gray	6

Quarterfinals
(Japan) Yusuke Morozumi	9
(China) Zou Dejia	2
(Ontario) Rob Retchless	3
(Ontario) Daryl Shane	7
(South Korea) Kim Chang-min	9
(Ontario) Brent Gray	3
(Ontario) Andrew Fairfull	5
(Ontario) Jordan Chandler	6

Semifinals
(Japan) Yusuke Morozumi	6
(Ontario) Daryl Shane	2
(South Korea) Kim Chang-min	6
(Ontario) Jordan Chandler	4

Qualifier 1
(Japan) Yusuke Morozumi	1
(South Korea) Kim Chang-min	7

Quarterfinals		Semifinals		Qualifier 2
(Ontario) Tanner Horgan	7
(Ontario) Greg Park	2	(Ontario) Tanner Horgan	6
(Ontario) Rob Lobel	2	(Ontario) Brandon Tippin	4
(Ontario) Brandon Tippin	7			(Ontario) Tanner Horgan	9
(Ontario) Richard Krell	8			(Ontario) Ian Dickie	6
(Ontario) Rob Ainsley	0	(Ontario) Richard Krell	2
(Ontario) Connor Duhaime	2	(Ontario) Ian Dickie	3
(Ontario) Ian Dickie	4

==== B event ====
Round of 16
(Ontario) Greg Park	3
(Ontario) Rob Lobel	5
(Ontario) Rob Ainsley	2
(Ontario) Connor Duhaime	4

Quarterfinals
(China) Zou Dejia	9
(Ontario) Rob Lobel	3
(Ontario) Brent Gray
(Ontario) Connor Duhaime

Semifinals
(China) Zou Dejia	6
(Ontario) Brent Gray	5

Qualifier 3
(China) Zou Dejia	7
(Ontario) Ian Dickie	4

Quarterfinals		Semifinals		Qualifier 4
(Ontario) Matthew Hall	6
(Ontario) Andrew Fairfull	3	(Ontario) Matthew Hall	5
(Slovakia) David Misun	2	(Ontario) Rob Retchless	7
(Ontario) Rob Retchless	7			(Ontario) Rob Retchless	6
				(Japan) Yusuke Morozumi	1

Semifinals		Qualifier 5
(Ontario) Brandon Tippin	1
(Ontario) Richard Krell	7	(Ontario) Richard Krell	2
(Ontario) Daryl Shane	4	(Ontario) Jordan Chandler	7
(Ontario) Jordan Chandler	7

==== C event ====
Round of 16
(Ontario) Andrew Fairfull	7
(Ontario) Greg Park	0

Quarterfinals
(Ontario) Andrew Fairfull	6
(Ontario) Connor Duhaime	1

Semifinals
(Ontario) Andrew Fairfull	8
(Ontario) Daryl Shane	4

Qualifier 6
(Ontario) Andrew Fairfull	5
(Japan) Yusuke Morozumi	4

Semifinals		Qualifier 7
(Ontario) Brent Gray	3
(Ontario) Matthew Hall	4	(Ontario) Matthew Hall	5
		(Ontario) Richard Krell	2

Round of 16
(Slovakia) David Misun	5
(Ontario) Rob Ainsley	4

Quarterfinals
(Ontario) Rob Lobel	8
(Slovakia) David Misun	3

Semifinals
(Ontario) Brandon Tippin	5
(Ontario) Rob Lobel	7

Qualifier 8
(Ontario) Rob Lobel	4
(Ontario) Ian Dickie	9

=== Playoffs ===
Quarterfinals
(South Korea) Kim Chang-min	5
(Ontario) Ian Dickie	2
(Ontario) Rob Retchless	7
(Ontario) Jordan Chandler	2
(Ontario) Tanner Horgan	2
(Ontario) Matthew Hall	7
(China) Zou Dejia	8
(Ontario) Andrew Fairfull	6

Semifinals
(South Korea) Kim Chang-min	5
(Ontario) Rob Retchless	7
(Ontario) Matthew Hall	6
(China) Zou Dejia	5

Final
(Ontario) Rob Retchless	4
(Ontario) Matthew Hall	5

== Women ==
=== Teams ===
Skip	Third	Second	Lead	Locale
Cathy Auld	Lori Eddy	Katie Cottrill	Jenna Bonner	Toronto, Ontario
Lisa Farnell	Sara Jahodova	Victoria Kyle	Niamh Fenton	Royal Tunbridge Wells, England
Tracy Fleury	Jennifer Wylie	Jenna Walsh	Amanda Gates	Sudbury, Ontario
Grace Francisci	Sarah Mooney	Cassandra Paccanaro	Danielle Miron	Oakville, Ontario
Susan Froud	Lauren Horton	Margot Flemming	Megan Arnold	Waterloo, Ontario
Jaimee Gardner	Jackie Kellie	Jenn Minchin	Ainsley Galbraith	Hamilton, Ontario
Jacqueline Harrison	Janet Murphy	Stephanie Matheson	Melissa Foster	Mississauga, Ontario
Danielle Inglis	Jessica Corrado	Stephanie Corrado	Cassandra de Groot	Toronto, Ontario
Erin Macaulay	Melissa Gannon	Rebecca Wichers-Schreur	Jessica Armstrong	Ottawa, Ontario
Sherry Middaugh	Jo-Ann Rizzo	Lee Merklinger	Leigh Armstrong	Coldwater, Ontario
Brittany Pearce	Katie Moreau	Sue Westwood	Corrie Wimmer	Penetanguishene, Ontario
Julie Tippin	Chantal Duhaime	Rachelle Vink	Tess Bobbie	Woodstock, Ontario
Emma Wallingford	Grace Holyoke	Lindsay Dubue	Hannah Wallingford	Ottawa, Ontario
Katelyn Wasylkiw	Lauren Wasylkiw	Stephanie Thompson	Katrina Collins	Unionville, Ontario
Ashley Waye	Courtney de Winter	Christina Walters	Trisha Halchuk	Toronto, Ontario

=== Round Robin Standings ===
Key
Teams to Playoffs

Pool A	W	L
(Ontario) Jacqueline Harrison	4	0
(Ontario) Danielle Inglis	3	1
(Ontario) Brittany Pearce	1	3
(Ontario) Erin Macaulay	1	3
(Ontario) Ashley Waye	1	3

Pool B	W	L
(Ontario) Sherry Middaugh	4	0
(Ontario) Susan Froud	2	2
(Ontario) Emma Wallingford	2	2
(Ontario) Cathy Auld	2	2
(England) Lisa Farnell	0	4

Pool C	W	L
(Ontario) Julie Tippin	4	0
(Ontario) Tracy Fleury	3	1
(Ontario) Jaime Gardner	2	2
(Ontario) Katelyn Wasylkiw	1	3
(Ontario) Grace Francisci	0	4

=== Playoffs ===
Quarterfinals
1	(Ontario) Julie Tippin	8
8	(Ontario) Cathy Auld	2
4	(Ontario) Tracy Fleury	7
5	(Ontario) Danielle Inglis	2
2	(Ontario) Sherry Middaugh	8
7	(Ontario) Emma Wallingford	4
3	(Ontario) Jacqueline Harrison	3
6	(Ontario) Susan Froud	4

Semifinals
(Ontario) Julie Tippin	3
(Ontario) Tracy Fleury	2
(Ontario) Sherry Middaugh	6
(Ontario) Susan Froud	8

Final
(Ontario) Julie Tippin	7
(Ontario) Susan Froud	2
