= 2024 KW Fall Classic =

- Host city: Waterloo, Ontario
- Arena: KW Granite Club
- Dates: September 19–22
- Men's winner: (Ontario) Team Epping
- Curling club: Northern Credit Union CC, Sudbury
- Skip: John Epping
- Third: Jacob Horgan
- Second: Tanner Horgan
- Lead: Ian McMillan
- Finalist: (Japan) Riku Yanagisawa
- Women's winner: (Ontario) Team Rozon
- Curling club: Oshawa CC, Oshawa
- Skip: Breanna Rozon
- Third: Chrissy Cadorin
- Second: Stephanie Thompson
- Lead: Jillian Page
- Alternate: Leigh Armstrong
- Coach: Russ Duhaime
- Finalist: (South Korea) Kim Eun-jung

The 2024 KW Fall Classic was held from September 19 to 22 at the KW Granite Club in Waterloo, Ontario. The men's event was held in a triple knockout while the women's event was held in a round robin. The purse was $11,000 for the men and $8,500 for the women.

== Men ==
=== Teams ===
The teams are listed as follows:

Skip	Third	Second	Lead	Alternate	Locale
Rob Ainsley	Terry Arnold	Riley Fung-Ernst	Graeme Robson		Toronto, Ontario
Scott Brandon	Mike Foster	Scott Dow	Danny Dow		Palmerston, Ontario
Carter Bryant	Jacob Dobson	Nolan Bryant	Matthew Abrams		Brantford, Ontario
Alex Champ	Kevin Flewwelling	Sean Harrison	Zander Elmes		Toronto, Ontario
Jordan Chandler	Landan Rooney	Connor Lawes	Robert Currie	Evan Lilly	Little Current, Ontario
Scott Dunnam	Cody Clouser	Lance Wheeler	Andrew Dunnam		(United States) Philadelphia, Pennsylvania
John Epping	Jacob Horgan	Tanner Horgan	Ian McMillan		Sudbury, Ontario
Pat Ferris	Connor Duhaime	Kurt Armstrong	Matt Pretty		Grimsby, Ontario
Mike Fournier	Charlie Richard	Émile Asselin	Punit Sthankiya		Toronto, Ontario
Kohsuke Hirata	Shingo Usui	Ryota Meguro	Yoshiya Miura		Kitami, Japan
Daniel Hocevar	Jacob Jones	Joel Matthews	Matthew Duizer		Toronto, Ontario
Mark Kean	Brady Lumley	Matthew Garner	Spencer Dunlop		Woodstock, Ontario
Jayden King	Dylan Niepage	Owen Henry	Daniel Del Conte		London, Ontario
Jacob Lamb	Daniel Vanveghel	Jordan McNamara	Colton Daly	Brendan Laframboise	Dundas, Ontario
Evan MacDougall	Dylan Stockton	Nathan Kim	Evan Madore		Guelph, Ontario
Kibo Mulima	Wesley Forget	Wyatt Small	Austin Snyder		Waterloo, Ontario
Scott Ray	Les Brownson	Shawn Ray	Will VanderMeulen		Tweed, Ontario
Sam Steep	Ian Dickie	Oliver Campbell	Paul Moffatt		Waterloo, Ontario
Riku Yanagisawa	Tsuyoshi Yamaguchi	Takeru Yamamoto	Satoshi Koizumi		Karuizawa, Japan

=== Knockout Brackets ===
==== A Event ====
First Knockout	Qualifier 1
(Japan) Riku Yanagisawa	6
(Ontario) Carter Bryant	3	(Ontario) Evan MacDougall	2
(Ontario) Evan MacDougall	8	(Japan) Riku Yanagisawa	7
(Ontario) Jordan Chandler	2
(United States) Scott Dunnam	5
(Ontario) Jordan Chandler	6
(Japan) Riku Yanagisawa	6
(Ontario) Jayden King	3
(Ontario) Jayden King	7
(Ontario) Jacob Lamb	2
(Ontario) Jayden King	5
(Ontario) Sam Steep	4
(Ontario) Mark Kean	6
(Ontario) Sam Steep	8

First Knockout	Qualifier 2
(Japan) Kohsuke Hirata	7
(Ontario) Rob Ainsley	5	(Ontario) Rob Ainsley	1
(Ontario) Scott Brandon	2	(Japan) Kohsuke Hirata	7
(Ontario) Kibo Mulima	2
(Ontario) Mike Fournier	5
(Ontario) Kibo Mulima	7
(Japan) Kohsuke Hirata	4
(Ontario) John Epping	7
(Ontario) John Epping	6
(Ontario) Daniel Hocevar	8	(Ontario) Daniel Hocevar	4
(Ontario) Scott Ray	3	(Ontario) John Epping	8
(Ontario) Alex Champ	3
(Ontario) Alex Champ	8
(Ontario) Pat Ferris	3

==== B Event ====
Second Knockout	Qualifier 3
(Ontario) Jacob Lamb	3
(Ontario) Carter Bryant	1	(United States) Scott Dunnam	9
(United States) Scott Dunnam	8	(United States) Scott Dunnam	5
(Ontario) Mark Kean	10
(Ontario) Evan MacDougall	2
(Ontario) Mark Kean	6
(Ontario) Mark Kean	8
(Japan) Kohsuke Hirata	5

Second Knockout	Qualifier 4
(Ontario) Daniel Hocevar	3
(Ontario) Scott Brandon	2	(Ontario) Mike Fournier	8
(Ontario) Mike Fournier	4	(Ontario) Mike Fournier	5
(Ontario) Rob Ainsley	6
(Ontario) Rob Ainsley	6
(Ontario) Scott Ray	2	(Ontario) Pat Ferris	5
(Ontario) Pat Ferris	7	(Ontario) Rob Ainsley	7
(Ontario) Jayden King	8

Second Knockout		Qualifier 5
(Ontario) Jordan Chandler	7
(Ontario) Sam Steep	2	(Ontario) Jordan Chandler	7
(Ontario) Kibo Mulima	11	(Ontario) Kibo Mulima	5
(Ontario) Alex Champ	8

==== C Event ====
Third Knockout	Qualifier 6
(Ontario) Carter Bryant	4
(Ontario) Evan MacDougall	6	(Ontario) Evan MacDougall	4
(Ontario) Jacob Lamb	6
(Ontario) Jacob Lamb	4
(Ontario) Alex Champ	8
(Ontario) Alex Champ	6
(Ontario) Rob Ainsley	7

Third Knockout		Qualifier 7
(United States) Scott Dunnam	7
(Ontario) Mike Fournier	2	(United States) Scott Dunnam	10
		(Ontario) Kibo Mulima	5

Third Knockout						Qualifier 8
				(Ontario) Sam Steep	2
(Ontario) Scott Brandon	3			(Ontario) Daniel Hocevar	5
(Ontario) Pat Ferris	4	(Ontario) Pat Ferris	3
(Ontario) Scott Ray	4	(Ontario) Daniel Hocevar	8
(Ontario) Daniel Hocevar	6					(Ontario) Daniel Hocevar	4
						(Japan) Kohsuke Hirata	5

=== Knockout Results ===
All draw times are listed in Eastern Time (UTC−04:00).

==== Draw 1 ====
Thursday, September 19, 8:30 pm

Sheet 1	1	2	3	4	5	6	7	8	Final
(Ontario) Rob Ainsley	0	0	0	1	0	1	3	X	5
(Ontario) Scott Brandon 🔨	1	0	0	0	1	0	0	X	2

Sheet 2	1	2	3	4	5	6	7	8	Final
(Ontario) Daniel Hocevar 🔨	0	3	2	1	2	0	X	X	8
(Ontario) Scott Ray	2	0	0	0	0	1	X	X	3

Sheet 4	1	2	3	4	5	6	7	8	Final
(Ontario) Carter Bryant 🔨	1	0	0	1	0	1	0	0	3
(Ontario) Evan MacDougall	0	0	3	0	1	0	2	2	8

Sheet 5	1	2	3	4	5	6	7	8	Final
(Ontario) Mike Fournier	1	0	0	1	2	0	1	0	5
(Ontario) Kibo Mulima 🔨	0	2	2	0	0	2	0	1	7

Sheet 6	1	2	3	4	5	6	7	8	Final
(Ontario) Alex Champ	0	2	2	0	2	0	2	X	8
(Ontario) Pat Ferris 🔨	1	0	0	1	0	1	0	X	3

==== Draw 2 ====
Friday, September 20, 8:00 am

Sheet 3	1	2	3	4	5	6	7	8	Final
(Japan) Riku Yanagisawa 🔨	1	1	0	2	1	0	1	X	6
(Ontario) Evan MacDougall	0	0	1	0	0	1	0	X	2

Sheet 4	1	2	3	4	5	6	7	8	Final
(United States) Scott Dunnam 🔨	1	1	0	0	0	2	0	1	5
(Ontario) Jordan Chandler	0	0	2	2	1	0	1	0	6

==== Draw 3 ====
Friday, September 20, 10:30 am

Sheet 1	1	2	3	4	5	6	7	8	Final
(Ontario) Scott Ray 🔨	0	0	0	0	2	0	0	X	2
(Ontario) Pat Ferris	1	1	2	1	0	1	1	X	7

Sheet 2	1	2	3	4	5	6	7	8	Final
(Ontario) Scott Brandon	0	0	0	0	1	0	1	0	2
(Ontario) Mike Fournier 🔨	2	0	0	1	0	0	0	1	4

Sheet 3	1	2	3	4	5	6	7	8	Final
(Ontario) Jayden King	2	2	0	2	1	0	X	X	7
(Ontario) Jacob Lamb 🔨	0	0	1	0	0	1	X	X	2

Sheet 4	1	2	3	4	5	6	7	8	Final
(Ontario) Mark Kean 🔨	2	0	1	0	3	0	0	0	6
(Ontario) Sam Steep	0	2	0	1	0	3	1	1	8

Sheet 5	1	2	3	4	5	6	7	8	Final
(Japan) Kohsuke Hirata 🔨	2	1	2	0	1	1	X	X	7
(Ontario) Rob Ainsley	0	0	0	1	0	0	X	X	1

Sheet 6	1	2	3	4	5	6	7	8	Final
(Ontario) John Epping	0	2	0	1	0	2	0	1	6
(Ontario) Daniel Hocevar 🔨	2	0	0	0	1	0	1	0	4

==== Draw 4 ====
Friday, September 20, 1:30 pm

Sheet 2	1	2	3	4	5	6	7	8	Final
(Ontario) Carter Bryant	0	1	0	0	0	0	X	X	1
(United States) Scott Dunnam 🔨	1	0	3	1	2	1	X	X	8

Sheet 5	1	2	3	4	5	6	7	8	Final
(Japan) Riku Yanagisawa 🔨	2	2	0	1	0	2	X	X	7
(Ontario) Jordan Chandler	0	0	1	0	1	0	X	X	2

==== Draw 5 ====
Friday, September 20, 4:00 pm

Sheet 1	1	2	3	4	5	6	7	8	Final
(Ontario) Evan MacDougall 🔨	0	0	1	0	0	1	X	X	2
(Ontario) Mark Kean	1	1	0	3	1	0	X	X	6

Sheet 2	1	2	3	4	5	6	7	8	Final
(Japan) Kohsuke Hirata 🔨	0	3	0	1	0	1	2	X	7
(Ontario) Kibo Mulima	1	0	0	0	1	0	0	X	2

Sheet 3	1	2	3	4	5	6	7	8	Final
(Ontario) Daniel Hocevar	0	1	0	0	1	1	0	X	3
(Ontario) Mike Fournier 🔨	3	0	2	1	0	0	2	X	8

Sheet 4	1	2	3	4	5	6	7	8	Final
(Ontario) Rob Ainsley 🔨	2	1	0	2	0	0	0	1	6
(Ontario) Pat Ferris	0	0	2	0	2	0	1	0	5

Sheet 5	1	2	3	4	5	6	7	8	Final
(Ontario) John Epping	0	3	0	1	0	4	X	X	8
(Ontario) Alex Champ 🔨	1	0	1	0	1	0	X	X	3

Sheet 6	1	2	3	4	5	6	7	8	Final
(Ontario) Jayden King	0	1	0	1	1	0	1	1	5
(Ontario) Sam Steep 🔨	0	0	3	0	0	1	0	0	4

==== Draw 7 ====
Friday, September 20, 9:30 pm

Sheet 1	1	2	3	4	5	6	7	8	Final
(Ontario) Scott Brandon 🔨	1	0	0	0	1	0	1	0	3
(Ontario) Pat Ferris	0	1	0	1	0	1	0	1	4

Sheet 4	1	2	3	4	5	6	7	8	Final
(Ontario) Scott Ray	0	1	0	2	0	1	0	0	4
(Ontario) Daniel Hocevar 🔨	1	0	1	0	2	0	1	1	6

Sheet 5	1	2	3	4	5	6	7	8	Final
(Ontario) Carter Bryant	0	0	0	1	1	0	2	0	4
(Ontario) Evan MacDougall 🔨	1	1	1	0	0	1	0	2	6

Sheet 6	1	2	3	4	5	6	7	8	Final
(Ontario) Jacob Lamb	1	1	0	1	0	0	0	X	3
(United States) Scott Dunnam 🔨	0	0	2	0	4	1	2	X	9

==== Draw 8 ====
Saturday, September 21, 8:00 am

Sheet 2	1	2	3	4	5	6	7	8	Final
(Japan) Riku Yanagisawa	0	0	2	2	0	2	0	X	6
(Ontario) Jayden King 🔨	0	0	0	0	2	0	1	X	3

Sheet 3	1	2	3	4	5	6	7	8	Final
(Japan) Kohsuke Hirata 🔨	2	0	0	1	0	1	X	X	4
(Ontario) John Epping	0	1	2	0	4	0	X	X	7

==== Draw 9 ====
Saturday, September 21, 10:30 am

Sheet 1	1	2	3	4	5	6	7	8	Final
(Ontario) Mike Fournier	0	0	3	0	0	1	1	0	5
(Ontario) Rob Ainsley 🔨	1	0	0	3	1	0	0	1	6

Sheet 2	1	2	3	4	5	6	7	8	Final
(Ontario) Jordan Chandler	1	0	4	0	1	1	X	X	7
(Ontario) Sam Steep 🔨	0	1	0	1	0	0	X	X	2

Sheet 3	1	2	3	4	5	6	7	8	Final
(Ontario) Kibo Mulima	0	4	0	2	0	4	0	1	11
(Ontario) Alex Champ 🔨	3	0	2	0	1	0	2	0	8

Sheet 4	1	2	3	4	5	6	7	8	Final
(Ontario) Evan MacDougall	0	0	1	1	0	0	2	X	4
(Ontario) Jacob Lamb 🔨	0	3	0	0	2	1	0	X	6

Sheet 5	1	2	3	4	5	6	7	8	Final
(United States) Scott Dunnam 🔨	0	0	3	0	2	0	X	X	5
(Ontario) Mark Kean	1	0	0	4	0	5	X	X	10

Sheet 6	1	2	3	4	5	6	7	8	Final
(Ontario) Pat Ferris 🔨	0	1	1	0	1	0	0	X	3
(Ontario) Daniel Hocevar	1	0	0	2	0	2	3	X	8

==== Draw 11 ====
Saturday, September 21, 4:00 pm

Sheet 1	1	2	3	4	5	6	7	8	Final
(Ontario) Jacob Lamb	0	2	2	0	0	0	0	X	4
(Ontario) Alex Champ 🔨	2	0	0	1	1	2	2	X	8

Sheet 2	1	2	3	4	5	6	7	8	Final
(Ontario) Mark Kean 🔨	2	0	1	1	0	2	0	2	8
(Japan) Kohsuke Hirata	0	2	0	0	1	0	2	0	5

Sheet 3	1	2	3	4	5	6	7	8	Final
(Ontario) Sam Steep	0	1	0	0	0	1	0	X	2
(Ontario) Daniel Hocevar 🔨	0	0	1	2	1	0	1	X	5

Sheet 4	1	2	3	4	5	6	7	8	Final
(Ontario) Jordan Chandler 🔨	1	1	0	2	2	0	0	1	7
(Ontario) Kibo Mulima	0	0	2	0	0	2	1	0	5

Sheet 5	1	2	3	4	5	6	7	8	9	Final
(Ontario) Rob Ainsley	0	2	0	2	0	0	3	0	0	7
(Ontario) Jayden King 🔨	3	0	1	0	0	1	0	2	1	8

Sheet 6	1	2	3	4	5	6	7	8	Final
(United States) Scott Dunnam	1	0	0	2	2	1	1	X	7
(Ontario) Mike Fournier 🔨	0	1	1	0	0	0	0	X	2

==== Draw 13 ====
Saturday, September 21, 9:30 pm

Sheet 2	1	2	3	4	5	6	7	8	Final
(United States) Scott Dunnam	0	2	0	0	2	0	3	3	10
(Ontario) Kibo Mulima 🔨	1	0	2	0	0	2	0	0	5

Sheet 3	1	2	3	4	5	6	7	8	Final
(Ontario) Alex Champ	0	2	0	2	0	1	0	1	6
(Ontario) Rob Ainsley 🔨	2	0	2	0	2	0	1	0	7

Sheet 5	1	2	3	4	5	6	7	8	Final
(Ontario) Daniel Hocevar	0	1	0	1	0	1	1	X	4
(Japan) Kohsuke Hirata 🔨	1	0	2	0	2	0	0	X	5

=== Playoffs ===
Quarterfinals
1	(Japan) Riku Yanagisawa	7
8	(Japan) Kohsuke Hirata	6
4	(Ontario) Jayden King	10
5	(Ontario) Jordan Chandler	5
3	(Ontario) Mark Kean	7
6	(Ontario) Rob Ainsley	2
2	(Ontario) John Epping	6
7	(United States) Scott Dunnam	1

Semifinals
1	(Japan) Riku Yanagisawa	7
4	(Ontario) Jayden King	1
3	(Ontario) Mark Kean	4
2	(Ontario) John Epping	9

Final
1	(Japan) Riku Yanagisawa	3
2	(Ontario) John Epping	4

==== Quarterfinals ====
Sunday, September 22, 11:00 am

Sheet 2	1	2	3	4	5	6	7	8	Final
(Ontario) Jayden King 🔨	0	2	0	2	1	0	5	X	10
(Ontario) Jordan Chandler	2	0	1	0	0	2	0	X	5

Sheet 3	1	2	3	4	5	6	7	8	Final
(Japan) Riku Yanagisawa 🔨	2	0	2	0	2	0	1	0	7
(Japan) Kohsuke Hirata	0	1	0	1	0	3	0	1	6

Sheet 4	1	2	3	4	5	6	7	8	Final
(Ontario) John Epping 🔨	0	2	1	1	0	2	X	X	6
(United States) Scott Dunnam	0	0	0	0	1	0	X	X	1

Sheet 5	1	2	3	4	5	6	7	8	Final
(Ontario) Mark Kean 🔨	2	0	2	2	1	X	X	X	7
(Ontario) Rob Ainsley	0	2	0	0	0	X	X	X	2

==== Semifinals ====
Sunday, September 22, 2:00 pm

Sheet 3	1	2	3	4	5	6	7	8	Final
(Ontario) Mark Kean	0	3	0	1	0	0	0	X	4
(Ontario) John Epping 🔨	2	0	2	0	1	1	3	X	9

Sheet 4	1	2	3	4	5	6	7	8	Final
(Japan) Riku Yanagisawa 🔨	0	3	2	2	X	X	X	X	7
(Ontario) Jayden King	1	0	0	0	X	X	X	X	1

==== Final ====
Sunday, September 22, 5:00 pm

Sheet 5	1	2	3	4	5	6	7	8	9	Final
(Japan) Riku Yanagisawa	0	0	0	0	0	0	2	1	0	3
(Ontario) John Epping 🔨	0	0	0	2	0	1	0	0	1	4

== Women ==
=== Teams ===
The teams are listed as follows:

Skip	Third	Second	Lead	Alternate	Locale
Hailey Armstrong	Grace Holyoke	Evelyn Robert	Alice Holyoke		Toronto, Ontario
Emma Artichuk	Megan Smith	Jamie Smith	Lauren Rajala	Scotia Maltman	Sudbury, Ontario
Chelsea Brandwood	Lauren Horton	Brenda Chapman	Keira McLaughlin		Niagara Falls, Ontario
Jessica Corrado	Kristina Brauch	Kaitlin Jewer	Jessica Byers	Karen Rowsell	Lakefield, Ontario
Katie Ford	Emily Middaugh	Madison Fisher	Tori Zemmelink		Guelph, Ontario
Ha Seung-youn	Kim Hye-rin	Yang Tae-i	Kim Su-jin	Park Seo-jin	Chuncheon, South Korea
Shelley Hardy	Stephanie Mumford	Abby Deschene	Stephanie Corrado		Sarnia, Ontario
Carly Howard	Katelyn Wasylkiw	Lynn Kreviazuk	Laura Hickey		Toronto, Ontario
Kim Eun-jung	Kim Kyeong-ae	Kim Cho-hi	Kim Seon-yeong	Kim Yeong-mi	Gangneung, South Korea
Ikue Kitazawa	Seina Nakajima	Ami Enami	Minori Suzuki	Hasumi Ishigooka	Nagano, Japan
Isabelle Ladouceur	Grace Lloyd	Michaela Robert	Rachel Steele		Whitby, Ontario
Emilie Lovitt	Celeste Gauthier	Sarah Leung	Jessica Filipcic	Amanda Smith	Toronto, Ontario
Jenny Madden	Emma Acres	Emily Parkinson	Jessica Guilbault		Ottawa, Ontario
Julia Markle	Paige Bown	Kailee Delaney	Emma Rebel		Navan, Ontario
Jo-Ann Rizzo	Janet Murphy	Lori Eddy	Mary Chilvers		Mississauga, Ontario
Breanna Rozon	Chrissy Cadorin	Stephanie Thompson	Jillian Page	Leigh Armstrong	Oshawa, Ontario

=== Round robin standings ===
Final Round Robin Standings

Key
Teams to Playoffs

Pool A	W	L	PF	PA	SO
(Ontario) Jo-Ann Rizzo	3	1	30	20	3
(South Korea) Kim Eun-jung	3	1	25	13	12
(Ontario) Hailey Armstrong	2	2	19	17	16
(Ontario) Jenny Madden	0	4	17	28	4

Pool B	W	L	PF	PA	SO
(Japan) Ikue Kitazawa	3	1	19	18	2
(Ontario) Chelsea Brandwood	3	1	30	19	8
(Ontario) Shelley Hardy	3	1	24	18	15
(Ontario) Emilie Lovitt	0	4	15	33	5

Pool C	W	L	PF	PA	SO
(South Korea) Ha Seung-youn	2	2	20	18	7
(Ontario) Katie Ford	2	2	23	21	9
(Ontario) Jessica Corrado	2	2	24	20	13
(Ontario) Carly Howard	1	3	21	29	10

Pool D	W	L	PF	PA	SO
(Ontario) Emma Artichuk	3	1	25	22	11
(Ontario) Breanna Rozon	2	2	16	22	1
(Ontario) Isabelle Ladouceur	2	2	17	17	14
(Ontario) Julia Markle	1	3	20	30	6

=== Round robin results ===
All draw times are listed in Eastern Time (UTC−04:00).

==== Draw 1 ====
Thursday, September 19, 8:30 pm

Sheet 3	1	2	3	4	5	6	7	8	Final
(South Korea) Kim Eun-jung	0	0	1	0	0	3	0	X	4
(Ontario) Emma Artichuk 🔨	2	0	0	3	1	0	1	X	7

==== Draw 2 ====
Friday, September 20, 8:00 am

Sheet 1	1	2	3	4	5	6	7	8	Final
(Ontario) Hailey Armstrong	1	0	1	0	2	0	0	1	5
(Ontario) Breanna Rozon 🔨	0	1	0	2	0	1	0	0	4

Sheet 2	1	2	3	4	5	6	7	8	Final
(Ontario) Jenny Madden 🔨	1	0	1	0	0	0	0	X	2
(Ontario) Isabelle Ladouceur	0	3	0	0	1	1	1	X	6

Sheet 5	1	2	3	4	5	6	7	8	9	Final
(Ontario) Jo-Ann Rizzo 🔨	0	3	3	0	2	0	1	0	1	10
(Ontario) Julia Markle	2	0	0	2	0	2	0	3	0	9

==== Draw 4 ====
Friday, September 20, 1:30 pm

Sheet 1	1	2	3	4	5	6	7	8	Final
(Japan) Ikue Kitazawa 🔨	1	0	0	2	0	1	0	2	6
(Ontario) Carly Howard	0	2	0	0	1	0	1	0	4

Sheet 3	1	2	3	4	5	6	7	8	Final
(Ontario) Shelley Hardy	2	3	0	1	2	1	X	X	9
(Ontario) Jessica Corrado 🔨	0	0	1	0	0	0	X	X	1

Sheet 4	1	2	3	4	5	6	7	8	Final
(Ontario) Chelsea Brandwood	2	0	0	1	1	1	2	X	7
(Ontario) Katie Ford 🔨	0	1	2	0	0	0	0	X	3

Sheet 6	1	2	3	4	5	6	7	8	Final
(Ontario) Emilie Lovitt	0	0	2	0	0	0	X	X	2
(South Korea) Ha Seung-youn 🔨	2	1	0	0	2	1	X	X	6

==== Draw 6 ====
Friday, September 20, 7:00 pm

Sheet 1	1	2	3	4	5	6	7	8	9	Final
(Ontario) Chelsea Brandwood 🔨	1	1	0	1	0	2	0	1	1	7
(Ontario) Jessica Corrado	0	0	2	0	3	0	1	0	0	6

Sheet 2	1	2	3	4	5	6	7	8	Final
(South Korea) Kim Eun-jung	1	1	1	5	X	X	X	X	8
(Ontario) Breanna Rozon 🔨	0	0	0	0	X	X	X	X	0

Sheet 3	1	2	3	4	5	6	7	8	Final
(Japan) Ikue Kitazawa	0	0	3	2	0	0	1	2	8
(Ontario) Katie Ford 🔨	1	1	0	0	1	1	0	0	4

Sheet 4	1	2	3	4	5	6	7	8	Final
(Ontario) Hailey Armstrong	3	0	0	3	2	X	X	X	8
(Ontario) Julia Markle 🔨	0	1	1	0	0	X	X	X	2

Sheet 5	1	2	3	4	5	6	7	8	Final
(Ontario) Jenny Madden 🔨	1	2	0	1	0	2	0	X	6
(Ontario) Emma Artichuk	0	0	2	0	3	0	3	X	8

Sheet 6	1	2	3	4	5	6	7	8	Final
(Ontario) Jo-Ann Rizzo 🔨	1	0	2	5	X	X	X	X	8
(Ontario) Isabelle Ladouceur	0	2	0	0	X	X	X	X	2

==== Draw 7 ====
Friday, September 20, 9:30 pm

Sheet 2	1	2	3	4	5	6	7	8	Final
(Ontario) Shelley Hardy	0	1	0	0	1	0	1	2	5
(South Korea) Ha Seung-youn 🔨	2	0	1	0	0	1	0	0	4

Sheet 3	1	2	3	4	5	6	7	8	Final
(Ontario) Emilie Lovitt 🔨	1	0	2	1	0	0	2	0	6
(Ontario) Carly Howard	0	2	0	0	2	2	0	2	8

==== Draw 8 ====
Saturday, September 21, 8:00 am

Sheet 1	1	2	3	4	5	6	7	8	Final
(Ontario) Jo-Ann Rizzo	0	0	1	0	2	1	3	X	7
(Ontario) Emma Artichuk 🔨	1	1	0	1	0	0	0	X	3

Sheet 4	1	2	3	4	5	6	7	8	Final
(Ontario) Jenny Madden	0	0	2	1	0	0	1	X	4
(Ontario) Breanna Rozon 🔨	3	0	0	0	2	1	0	X	6

Sheet 5	1	2	3	4	5	6	7	8	Final
(Ontario) Hailey Armstrong 🔨	0	0	0	0	0	1	0	X	1
(Ontario) Isabelle Ladouceur	0	0	0	1	2	0	1	X	4

Sheet 6	1	2	3	4	5	6	7	8	Final
(South Korea) Kim Eun-jung 🔨	0	2	0	3	1	1	X	X	7
(Ontario) Julia Markle	0	0	1	0	0	0	X	X	1

==== Draw 10 ====
Saturday, September 21, 1:30 pm

Sheet 1	1	2	3	4	5	6	7	8	Final
(Ontario) Emilie Lovitt 🔨	0	3	0	0	0	0	0	X	3
(Ontario) Katie Ford	0	0	1	3	1	1	3	X	9

Sheet 2	1	2	3	4	5	6	7	8	Final
(Ontario) Hailey Armstrong	2	1	1	0	1	0	0	0	5
(Ontario) Emma Artichuk 🔨	0	0	0	1	0	2	3	1	7

Sheet 3	1	2	3	4	5	6	7	8	9	Final
(Ontario) Chelsea Brandwood 🔨	1	1	0	1	0	0	1	2	0	6
(South Korea) Ha Seung-youn	0	0	4	0	1	1	0	0	1	7

Sheet 4	1	2	3	4	5	6	7	8	Final
(South Korea) Kim Eun-jung 🔨	0	1	0	2	0	2	0	1	6
(Ontario) Isabelle Ladouceur	2	0	1	0	1	0	1	0	5

Sheet 5	1	2	3	4	5	6	7	8	Final
(Ontario) Shelley Hardy	0	0	3	1	0	0	1	2	7
(Ontario) Carly Howard 🔨	1	2	0	0	2	1	0	0	6

Sheet 6	1	2	3	4	5	6	7	8	Final
(Japan) Ikue Kitazawa	0	0	0	0	X	X	X	X	0
(Ontario) Jessica Corrado 🔨	2	2	2	1	X	X	X	X	7

==== Draw 12 ====
Saturday, September 21, 7:00 pm

Sheet 1	1	2	3	4	5	6	7	8	Final
(Ontario) Jenny Madden	0	1	0	2	1	0	1	0	5
(Ontario) Julia Markle 🔨	4	0	1	0	0	2	0	1	8

Sheet 2	1	2	3	4	5	6	7	8	Final
(Ontario) Chelsea Brandwood	0	2	0	0	4	0	4	X	10
(Ontario) Carly Howard 🔨	0	0	1	1	0	1	0	X	3

Sheet 3	1	2	3	4	5	6	7	8	Final
(Ontario) Jo-Ann Rizzo	0	1	1	0	1	0	2	0	5
(Ontario) Breanna Rozon 🔨	2	0	0	1	0	2	0	1	6

Sheet 4	1	2	3	4	5	6	7	8	Final
(Japan) Ikue Kitazawa	0	2	1	1	1	0	0	X	5
(South Korea) Ha Seung-youn 🔨	1	0	0	0	0	1	1	X	3

Sheet 5	1	2	3	4	5	6	7	8	Final
(Ontario) Emilie Lovitt	0	1	0	3	0	0	0	X	4
(Ontario) Jessica Corrado 🔨	3	0	1	0	2	3	1	X	10

Sheet 6	1	2	3	4	5	6	7	8	Final
(Ontario) Shelley Hardy	2	0	0	0	1	0	0	X	3
(Ontario) Katie Ford 🔨	0	0	2	2	0	2	1	X	7

=== Playoffs ===
Quarterfinals
1	(Japan) Ikue Kitazawa	7
8	(South Korea) Ha Seung-youn	2
4	(Ontario) Emma Artichuk	4
5	(South Korea) Kim Eun-jung	8
3	(Ontario) Chelsea Brandwood	4
6	(Ontario) Shelley Hardy	5
2	(Ontario) Jo-Ann Rizzo	6
7	(Ontario) Breanna Rozon	7

Semifinals
1	(Japan) Ikue Kitazawa	5
5	(South Korea) Kim Eun-jung	6
6	(Ontario) Shelley Hardy	5
7	(Ontario) Breanna Rozon	8

Final
5	(South Korea) Kim Eun-jung	3
7	(Ontario) Breanna Rozon	6

==== Quarterfinals ====
Sunday, September 22, 8:30 am

Sheet 2	1	2	3	4	5	6	7	8	9	Final
(Ontario) Jo-Ann Rizzo 🔨	0	1	0	1	0	2	0	2	0	6
(Ontario) Breanna Rozon	0	0	2	0	2	0	2	0	1	7

Sheet 3	1	2	3	4	5	6	7	8	Final
(Japan) Ikue Kitazawa 🔨	0	0	4	1	0	0	2	X	7
(South Korea) Ha Seung-youn	0	1	0	0	1	0	0	X	2

Sheet 4	1	2	3	4	5	6	7	8	Final
(Ontario) Chelsea Brandwood 🔨	1	0	1	0	0	1	1	0	4
(Ontario) Shelley Hardy	0	1	0	1	1	0	0	2	5

Sheet 5	1	2	3	4	5	6	7	8	Final
(Ontario) Emma Artichuk 🔨	2	0	1	0	0	1	0	X	4
(South Korea) Kim Eun-jung	0	1	0	3	1	0	3	X	8

==== Semifinals ====
Sunday, September 22, 2:00 pm

Sheet 2	1	2	3	4	5	6	7	8	Final
(Japan) Ikue Kitazawa 🔨	2	0	2	0	0	1	0	0	5
(South Korea) Kim Eun-jung	0	1	0	1	1	0	0	3	6

Sheet 5	1	2	3	4	5	6	7	8	Final
(Ontario) Shelley Hardy 🔨	0	1	2	0	0	0	2	0	5
(Ontario) Breanna Rozon	0	0	0	2	2	2	0	2	8

==== Final ====
Sunday, September 22, 5:00 pm

Sheet 3	1	2	3	4	5	6	7	8	Final
(South Korea) Kim Eun-jung 🔨	0	0	2	0	1	0	0	0	3
(Ontario) Breanna Rozon	0	0	0	2	0	2	1	1	6
