= Richard Seto =

American physicist

- Education: Yale University; Columbia University
- Occupation: Physicist

Richard Seto is an American physicist. He is a professor in the department of physics and astronomy at the University of California, Riverside.

In 2012, Seto was named a fellow of the American Physical Society, "for creative experimentation and leadership in the study of hadronic matter under extreme conditions including measurements and analysis leading to the discovery of the strongly-interacting Quark Gluon Plasma (sQGP)".
