= Scott McDonald (curler) =

Canadian curler (born 1986)

- Curler
- Born: May 8, 1986 (age 40); Mississauga, Ontario, Canada

Team
- Curling club: Highland CC, London, ON
- Skip: Scott McDonald
- Third: Sam Steep
- Second: Oliver Campbell
- Lead: Paul Moffatt
- Mixed doubles partner: Laura Neil

Curling career
- Member Association: Ontario (2001–2020; 2021–2022; 2023; 2026–present); Nova Scotia (2021); New Brunswick (2022–2023); Newfoundland and Labrador (2025–2026)
- Brier: 2 (2019, 2021)
- Top CTRS ranking: 9th (2018-19)

Scott McDonald (born May 8, 1986) is a Canadian curler from St. Thomas, Ontario. He currently skips his own team out of Waterloo, Ontario.

== Career ==
=== Juniors ===
McDonald had a successful junior career which involved winning the 2002 provincial Bantam championship (playing lead for Andrew Nixon), the 2004 provincial school boy championship for London's St. Thomas Aquinas Catholic Secondary School, and the 2007 provincial junior mixed championship.

=== Men's ===
Following juniors, McDonald went on to play on the World Curling Tour, first for Kirk Ziola and then for Wayne Tuck, Jr. (playing second on both teams). In 2012, McDonald would form his own team as skip. McDonald won his first Tour event as a skip at the 2013 KW Fall Classic. He would win the event again in 2014. After playing three seasons for the Codey Maus rink, McDonald formed his own team again in 2018. His new team found success on the Tour, winning the 2018 Challenge de Curling de Gatineau and playing in two Grand Slam events.

McDonald has played in five provincial championships. He played in the 2010 Ontario Men's Curling Championship with Ziola, finishing 2-8 and in the 2012 The Dominion Tankard with Tuck, finishing 5-5, finishing 6-5 (losing in a tiebreaker) at the 2017 Ontario Tankard, throwing last stones for Codey Maus, 5-3 at the 2018 Ontario Tankard (losing in the semifinal), playing third for Maus and winning the 2019 Ontario Tankard as a skip, going undefeated to win his first provincial title. McDonald went on to skip Team Ontario at the 2019 Tim Hortons Brier, leading his rink to a 6–5 record, finishing in sixth place overall.

Due to the COVID-19 pandemic in Canada, many provinces had to cancel their provincial championships, with member associations selecting their representatives for the 2021 Tim Hortons Brier. As the reigning provincial champions in Nova Scotia, Team Jamie Murphy was invited to represent Nova Scotia at the Brier, which they accepted. Murphy, however, opted not to attend the event due to travel restrictions. Murphy's team of Paul Flemming, Scott Saccary and Phil Crowell then invited McDonald to skip them at the national championship in Calgary, Alberta. At the 2021 Brier, McDonald led Team Nova Scotia to a 4–4 record, failing to qualify for the championship round.

=== Mixed doubles ===
McDonald went to his first national championship when he and Jaclyn Rivington won the provincial mixed doubles challenge. The pair went to the 2013 Canadian Mixed Doubles Curling Trials. After going 7-0 in the round robin, they were eliminated in their first playoff match.

=== Mixed ===
McDonald won the Ontario Mixed Championship in 2022 with teammates Lori Eddy, Matthew Hall and Laura Neil, and represent Ontario at the 2023 Canadian Mixed Curling Championship. There, Team McDonald would finish the round robin with a 7–3 record, qualifying for the playoffs. After losing in the semifinals to Manitoba, they would rebound and win a bronze medal, beating Nova Scotia's Paul Flemming 8–3 in the bronze medal game.

== Personal life ==
McDonald works as an accident benefits claims adjuster for Intact Insurance. He is engaged to Laura Neil.

== Grand Slam record ==
Key
C	Champion
F	Lost in Final
SF	Lost in Semifinal
QF	Lost in Quarterfinals
R16	Lost in the round of 16
Q	Did not advance to playoffs
T2	Played in Tier 2 event
DNP	Did not participate in event
N/A	Not a Grand Slam event that season

Event	2018–19	2019–20
Masters	DNP	Q
Tour Challenge	T2	Q
The National	Q	Q
Canadian Open	Q	DNP
