= Sarah Potts (curler) =

Canadian curler

- Curler
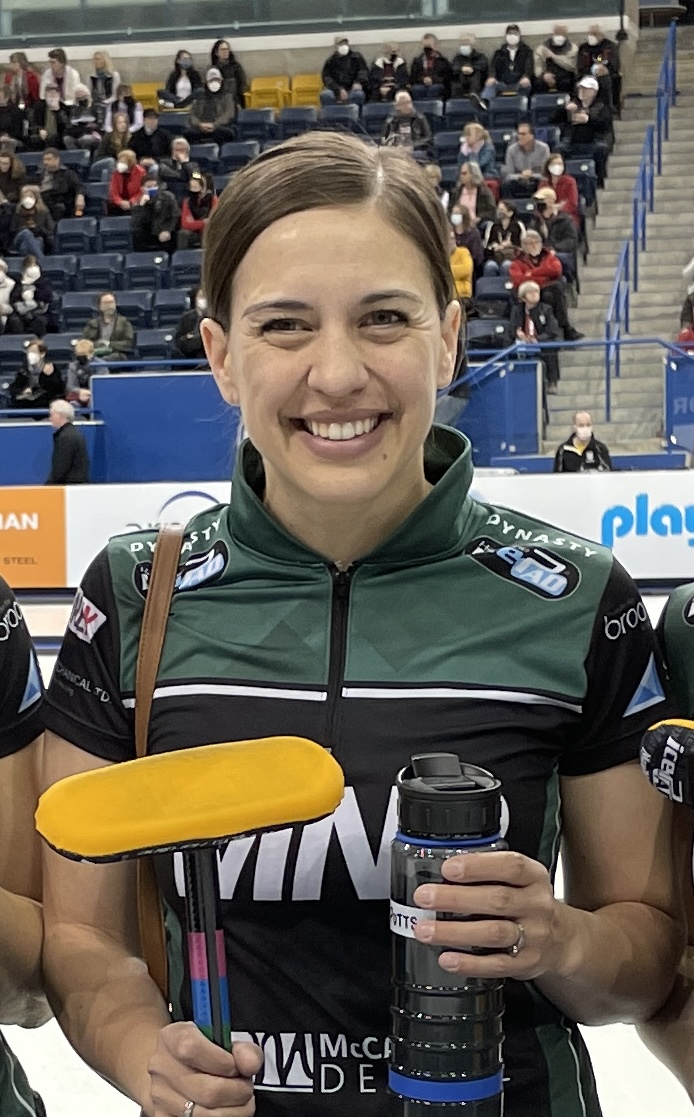
- Potts at the 2022 Players' Championship
- Born: Sarah Lang; September 21, 1989 (age 37); Thunder Bay, Ontario, Canada

Team
- Curling club: Fort William CC, Thunder Bay

Curling career
- Member Association: Northern Ontario
- Hearts: 9 (2010, 2016, 2017, 2019, 2022, 2023, 2024, 2025, 2026)
- Top CTRS ranking: 8th (2021–22)
Medal record
Curling
Representing Northern Ontario
Scotties Tournament of Hearts
Silver medal – second place	2016 Grande Prairie
Silver medal – second place	2022 Thunder Bay
Bronze medal – third place	2023 Kamloops
Representing Ontario
Scotties Tournament of Hearts
Bronze medal – third place	2010 Sault Ste. Marie
Canadian Olympic Curling Trials
Bronze medal – third place	2021 Saskatoon

Sarah Potts (née Lang; born September 21, 1989) is a Canadian curler. She is a four-time Scotties Tournament of Hearts medallist, winning silver representing Northern Ontario in 2016 and 2022 and bronze representing Ontario in 2010 and Northern Ontario in 2023.

== Career ==
Potts started curling at the age of 7. She represented Northern Ontario at the 2008 Canadian Junior Curling Championships, playing third for Ashley Miharija. The team finished the round robin with an 8–4 record and lost in a tiebreaker to Saskatchewan's Stephanie McVicar.

Potts was the alternate for Krista McCarville's Ontario team at the 2010 Scotties Tournament of Hearts, winning bronze. The following season, she fully joined the team at lead. The team lost in the 3 vs. 4 page playoff game at the 2010 Canada Cup. They were runner-ups at the 2011 Ontario Scotties Tournament of Hearts, losing the final to Rachel Homan. Potts won her first World Curling Tour event at the 2010 Molson Cash Spiel.

Potts, with Team McCarville, placed fourth at the Ontario Scotties Tournament of Hearts in 2012 and 2013, losing the 3 vs. 4 game to Sherry Middaugh both times. The team missed the playoffs at the 2013 Canadian Olympic Curling Pre-Trials.

For the 2014–15 season, Potts joined Kendra Lilly's team at third, as McCarville took a year off from curling. They lost the final of the 2015 Northern Ontario Scotties Tournament of Hearts (the inaugural Northern Ontario Scotties Tournament of Hearts) to Tracy Horgan of Sudbury.

Potts re-joined McCarville's team at lead for the 2015–16 season, with Lilly at third and Ashley Sippala at second. They won the 2015 Colonial Square Ladies Classic, Molson Cash Spiel, and Curl Mesabi Classic, and the 2016 U.S. Open of Curling. Oye-Sem Won Briand replaced Potts at the 2016 Northern Ontario Scotties Tournament of Hearts, which Team McCarville won. Potts returned to compete at the 2016 Scotties Tournament of Hearts, where they finished the round robin with a 7–4 record and won the 3 vs. 4 game and the semifinal to advance to the final against Alberta's Chelsea Carey, where they lost, settling for a silver medal.

Team McCarville defended their provincial title, winning the 2017 Northern Ontario Scotties Tournament of Hearts. At the 2017 Scotties Tournament of Hearts, they finished in fourth place, losing the bronze medal match to Chelsea Carey.

Potts, along with the McCarville team, won one of the qualifying spots from the 2017 Canadian Olympic Curling Pre-Trials, qualifying for the main trials. There, they missed playoffs with a 4–4 round robin record. They lost to Tracy Fleury in the final of the 2018 Northern Ontario Scotties Tournament of Hearts.

In the 2018–19 season, Potts and Team McCarville won the 2019 Northern Ontario Scotties Tournament of Hearts, defeating Jenna Enge in the final. At the 2019 Scotties Tournament of Hearts, they lost in the 3 vs. 4 game against Rachel Homan. Potts won the Marj Mitchell Sportsmanship Award and was named the Second Team All-Star Lead. On the World Curling Tour that season, they won the KW Fall Classic and the Curl Mesabi Classic.

Potts won the 2019 Curl Mesabi Classic with Team McCarville, defeating Laura Walker in the final. Potts was replaced by Jen Gates for the 2020 Northern Ontario Scotties Tournament of Hearts and the 2020 Scotties Tournament of Hearts, as she was pregnant.

The 2021 Northern Ontario provincial playdowns were cancelled due to the COVID-19 pandemic in Ontario. Potts, with McCarville's team, was given an automatic invitation to represent Northern Ontario at the 2021 Scotties Tournament of Hearts in Calgary, since McCarville, Lilly, and Sippala were the 2020 provincial champions. However, the team declined the invitation, citing family and work priorities.

Team McCarville had enough points to qualify for the 2021 Canadian Olympic Curling Pre-Trials. There, they went 5–1 through the round robin, qualifying for the playoffs. The team had two impressive come-from-behind wins in their two playoff games. In their first game against the Mackenzie Zacharias rink, they were down 7–3 heading into the tenth end, but scored four points, then stole a point in the extra end to win the match. In their second game against Jacqueline Harrison, the team gave up five points in the second end to trail 5–1, but rallied back to win the game 9–6. With the win, they qualified for the 2021 Canadian Olympic Curling Trials, held November 20 to 28 in Saskatoon, Saskatchewan. At the Trials, the team went through the round robin with a 4–4 record. This earned them a spot in the second tiebreaker where they defeated Kerri Einarson 4–3. In the semifinal, they lost 8–3 to Jennifer Jones, eliminating them from contention. The 2022 Northern Ontario Scotties Tournament of Hearts was cancelled due to the pandemic and Team McCarville were selected to represent their province at the national women's championship. At the 2022 Scotties Tournament of Hearts, the team went 5–3 through the round robin, enough to qualify for the playoffs. The team then won both of their seeding round games and defeated New Brunswick's Andrea Crawford in the 1 vs. 2 page playoff game to qualify for the final where they faced the Einarson rink. There, they could not keep their momentum going, losing the Scotties final 9–6. They wrapped up their season at the 2022 Players' Championship where they missed the playoffs.

With their success at the Olympic Trials and Scotties, the McCarville rink racked up enough points to qualify for the first Slam of the 2022–23 season, the 2022 National. There, they finished with a 1–3 record, defeating Hollie Duncan in their lone win. The team also qualified for the 2022 Tour Challenge Tier 2 event, winning one game against Denmark's Madeleine Dupont. In December, Team McCarville competed in the Curl Mesabi Classic where they went undefeated until the final, losing 5–3 to the United States' Tabitha Peterson. Next for the team was the 2023 Northern Ontario Scotties Tournament of Hearts. There, they finished first through the round robin with a 5–1 record, earning them a spot in the 1 vs. 2 game. They defeated Jackie McCormick to advance to the final where they topped Krysta Burns 9–4, securing their spot in the 2023 Scotties Tournament of Hearts in Kamloops, British Columbia. At the Hearts, the team topped their pool with a 7–1 record before defeating Nova Scotia's Christina Black in the page seeding game to reach the 1 vs. 2 game for a second straight year. However, they lost both the page playoff and semifinal to Manitoba's Jennifer Jones and Canada's Kerri Einarson respectively, settling for bronze.

For the 2023–24 season, Team McCarville added New Brunswick native Andrea Kelly as their new third, with Potts, Lilly and Sippala rotating on the front-end. The team had immediate success together, winning the 2023 KW Fall Classic by defeating Scotland's Rebecca Morrison. They also had a quarterfinal finish at the North Grenville Women's Fall Curling Classic, losing out to Hailey Armstrong. In the new year, the team again won the 2024 Northern Ontario Scotties Tournament of Hearts with ease, going undefeated to claim their fourth straight title at the event. At the 2024 Scotties Tournament of Hearts in Calgary, the team had mixed results. Sitting 4–3 heading into their last round robin game, they lost to Manitoba's Kaitlyn Lawes 6–5. This created a five-way tie for third with Lawes, British Columbia, Quebec, and Saskatchewan. With tiebreaker games abolished and the first tiebreaker (which was head-to-head between all tied teams) tied as well at 2–2, cumulative last stone draw distance between all the teams was used to decide who would make the playoffs. The McCarville rink finished with a total of 370.3 but would miss the playoffs as the Lawes rink finished first with a 231.6.

Team McCarville reached the final in their first event of the 2024–25 season, losing to Japan's Miyu Ueno at the Mother Club Fall Curling Classic. They next played in the 2024 Stu Sells Toronto Tankard where they were taken out by eventual champion Kim Eun-jung in the quarterfinals. In November 2024, they won the Stu Sells Living Waters Collingwood Classic, going undefeated to claim the title. At the 2025 Northern Ontario Women's Curling Championship, the team finished the round robin in a three-way tie for first place. After beating Robyn Despins in the semifinal, the McCarville rink scored one in the tenth end of the final to defeat Emma Artichuk 6–5, securing their fifth consecutive Northern Ontario women's title. This qualified them for the 2025 Scotties Tournament of Hearts which was played at the Fort William Gardens, adjacent to the Fort William Curling Club they curl out of. There, the team had a disappointing start, losing their first four games. They then won their last four games, however, it was not enough to qualify for the playoffs. A week after the event, the team announced Andrea Kelly stepped away from the team and returned to New Brunswick.

== Personal life ==
Potts' father is two-time world champion and three-time Brier champion Rick Lang. Her mother is world champion and two-time Scotties Tournament of Hearts champion Lorraine Lang. Potts is employed as a social worker at St. Joseph's Hospital. She is married to Jordan Potts and they have two twin children.
