= 2018 Northern Ontario Scotties Tournament of Hearts =

- Host city: Sudbury, Ontario
- Arena: Idylwylde Golf & Country Club
- Dates: January 11–14
- Winner: Team Fleury
- Curling club: Idylwylde G&CC, Sudbury, Ontario
- Skip: Tracy Fleury
- Third: Crystal Webster
- Second: Amanda Gates
- Lead: Jennifer Wylie
- Alternate: Jenna Enge
- Coach: Andrea Ronnebeck
- Finalist: Krista McCarville

The 2018 Northern Ontario Scotties Tournament of Hearts, the Northern Ontario women's curling championship, was held January 11–14 at the Idylwylde Golf & Country Club in Sudbury, Ontario. The winning Tracy Fleury rink represented Northern Ontario at the 2018 Scotties Tournament of Hearts in Penticton, British Columbia.

== Teams ==
Skip	Third	Second	Lead	Alternate	Club
Tracy Fleury	Crystal Webster	Amanda Gates	Jennifer Wylie	Jenna Enge	Idylwylde Golf & Country Club, Sudbury
Krista McCarville	Kendra Lilly	Ashley Sippala	Sarah Potts		Fort William Curling Club, Thunder Bay
Bella Croisier	Jamie Smith	Lauren Rajala	Piper Croisier		Idylwylde Golf & Country Club, Sudbury

== Standings ==
Double Round Robin Format

Key
Teams to Final

Skip	W	L
Krista McCarville	3	1
Tracy Fleury	3	1
Bella Croisier	0	4

== Results ==
All draws are listed in Eastern Time (UTC−05:00).

=== Draw 1 ===
Thursday, January 11, 2:00 pm

Sheet 4	1	2	3	4	5	6	7	8	9	10	Final
Bella Croisier 🔨	1	0	1	0	0	1	0	0	1	0	4
Tracy Fleury	0	1	0	2	1	0	0	1	0	1	6

=== Draw 2 ===
Thursday, January 11, 7:30 pm

Sheet 3	1	2	3	4	5	6	7	8	9	10	Final
Krista McCarville 🔨	0	0	1	4	0	1	0	1	0	X	7
Tracy Fleury	1	0	0	0	1	0	1	0	1	X	4

=== Draw 3 ===
Friday, January 12, 9:00 am

Sheet 4	1	2	3	4	5	6	7	8	9	10	Final
Krista McCarville	1	0	0	0	2	0	0	1	0	1	5
Bella Croisier 🔨	0	0	1	0	0	1	0	0	1	0	3

=== Draw 4 ===
Friday, January 12, 2:00 pm

Sheet 3	1	2	3	4	5	6	7	8	9	10	Final
Tracy Fleury 🔨	2	1	0	1	1	0	3	X	X	X	8
Bella Croisier	0	0	1	0	0	2	0	X	X	X	3

=== Draw 5 ===
Friday, January 12, 7:30 pm

Sheet 4	1	2	3	4	5	6	7	8	9	10	Final
Tracy Fleury 🔨	0	2	0	2	0	3	0	2	X	X	9
Krista McCarville	0	0	1	0	2	0	1	0	X	X	4

=== Draw 6 ===
Saturday, January 13, 9:30 am

Sheet 2	1	2	3	4	5	6	7	8	9	10	Final
Bella Croisier	0	0	0	1	0	0	1	X	X	X	2
Krista McCarville 🔨	0	1	2	0	1	3	0	X	X	X	7

== Final ==
Saturday, January 13, 7:30 pm

Sheet 4	1	2	3	4	5	6	7	8	9	10	Final
Krista McCarville 🔨	0	0	1	0	2	1	0	0	0	X	4
Tracy Fleury	0	0	0	2	0	0	2	1	1	X	6

2018 Northern Ontario Scotties Tournament of Hearts

Tracy Fleury
6th Northern Ontario Women's Championship title
