= 2017 Northern Ontario Scotties Tournament of Hearts =

- Host city: Nipigon, Ontario
- Arena: Nipigon Curling and Event Centre
- Dates: January 18–22
- Winner: Team McCarville
- Curling club: Fort William Curling Club, Thunder Bay
- Skip: Krista McCarville
- Third: Kendra Lilly
- Second: Ashley Sippala
- Lead: Sarah Potts
- Finalist: Tracy Fleury

The 2017 Northern Ontario Scotties Tournament of Hearts, the Northern Ontario women's curling championship, was held January 18–24 at the Nipigon Curling and Event Centre in Nipigon, Ontario. The winning Krista McCarville rink represented Northern Ontario at the 2017 Scotties Tournament of Hearts in St. Catharines, Ontario. The win sent McCarville to her sixth national Scotties Tournament of Hearts.

For the third straight year, the final featured the McCarville rink from Thunder Bay against the Tracy Fleury rink from Sudbury. McCarville had won the Northern Ontario in 2016 as well, and went all the way to the finals of the 2016 Scotties Tournament of Hearts. Despite this, the Fleury team were the higher ranked rink going into the tournament. In the final, Team McCarville stole single points in the 4th and 5th points and then two points in the sixth end en route to winning the Northern Ontario championship.

The event was a double-round robin, from which the top two teams played in a final match for the championship.

== Teams ==
Skip	Third	Second	Lead	Alternate	Club
Tracy Fleury	Jennifer Wylie	Jenna Walsh	Amanda Gates	Crystal Webster	Idylwylde Golf & Country Club, Sudbury
Krista McCarville	Kendra Lilly	Ashley Sippala	Sarah Potts		Fort William Curling Club, Thunder Bay
Hailey Beaudry	Kendra Lemieux	Emily Cooney	Erin Tomalty		Fort William Curling Club, Thunder Bay
Larissa Mikkelsen	Shana Marchessault	Ali McCullouch	Kady Stachiw		Port Arthur Curling Club, Thunder Bay

== Standings ==
Skip	W	L
McCarville	5	1
Fleury	5	1
Beaudry (Note: Teams Beaudry and Mikkelson did not play their final match.)	1	4
Mikkelson	0	5

== Scores ==
The scores are as follows:

=== January 18 ===
Draw 1

- Fleury 14-5 Beaudry
- McCarville 9-2 Mikkelson

=== January 19 ===
Draw 2

- McCarville 10-2 Beaudry
- Fleury 9-2 Mikkelson

Draw 3

- McCarville 7-10 Fleury
- Mikkelson 7-8 Beaudry

=== January 20 ===
Draw 4

- Mikkelsen 4-8 McCarville
- Beaudry 3-9 Fleury

Draw 5

- Mikkelsen 3-9 Fleury
- Beaudry 3-9 McCarville

=== January 21 ===
- McCarville 5-4 Fleury

=== Final ===
Saturday Jan.21 7:30 PM

Sheet C	1	2	3	4	5	6	7	8	9	10	Final
Tracy Fleury 🔨	0	1	0	0	0	0	2	0	3	0	6
Krista McCarville	0	0	1	1	1	2	0	2	0	3	10

2017 Northern Ontario Scotties Tournament of Hearts

Krista McCarville
6th Northern Ontario Women's Championship title
