= 2015 The National =

Grand Slam of Curling event

- Host city: Oshawa, Ontario
- Arena: General Motors Centre
- Dates: November 11–15
- Winner: (Newfoundland and Labrador) Team Gushue
- Curling club: Bally Haly G&CC, St. John's, NL
- Skip: Brad Gushue
- Third: Mark Nichols
- Second: Brett Gallant
- Lead: Geoff Walker
- Finalist: (Manitoba) Reid Carruthers
- Women's winner: (Ontario) Team Homan
- Curling club: Ottawa CC, Ottawa, ON
- Skip: Rachel Homan
- Third: Emma Miskew
- Second: Joanne Courtney
- Lead: Lisa Weagle
- Finalist: (Ontario) Tracy Fleury

The 2015 The National was held from November 11 to 15 at the General Motors Centre in Oshawa, Ontario. The National was the third Grand Slam event of the season for the men's and women's 2015–16 curling season.

Brad Gushue won his fourth Grand Slam title by defeating Reid Carruthers 7–2 in the men's final. Rachel Homan topped Tracy Fleury 5–4 in the women's final to also claim her fourth Slam title.

== Men ==
=== Teams ===
Skip	Third	Second	Lead	Locale
Brendan Bottcher	Tom Appelman	Thomas Scoffin	Karrick Martin	Edmonton, Alberta
Reid Carruthers	Braeden Moskowy	Derek Samagalski	Colin Hodgson	West St. Paul, Manitoba
Niklas Edin	Oskar Eriksson	Kristian Lindström	Christoffer Sundgren	Karlstad, Sweden
John Epping	Mathew Camm	Patrick Janssen	Tim March	Toronto, Ontario
Brad Gushue	Mark Nichols	Brett Gallant	Geoff Walker	Newfoundland and Labrador
Glenn Howard	Wayne Middaugh	Richard Hart	Scott Howard	Penetanguishene, Ontario
Brad Jacobs	Ryan Fry	E. J. Harnden	Ryan Harnden	Sault Ste. Marie, Ontario
Kevin Koe	Marc Kennedy	Brent Laing	Ben Hebert	Calgary, Alberta
Steve Laycock	Kirk Muyres	Colton Flasch	Dallan Muyres	Saskatoon, Saskatchewan
Mike McEwen	B. J. Neufeld	Matt Wozniak	Denni Neufeld	Winnipeg, Manitoba
Jean-Michel Ménard	Martin Crête	Éric Sylvain	Philippe Ménard	Quebec City, Quebec
Sven Michel	Marc Pfister	Enrico Pfister	Simon Gempeler	Adelboden, Switzerland
John Shuster	Tyler George	Matt Hamilton	John Landsteiner	(United States) Duluth, Minnesota
Pat Simmons	John Morris	Carter Rycroft	Nolan Thiessen	Calgary, Alberta
Thomas Ulsrud	Torger Nergård	Christoffer Svae	Håvard Vad Petersson	Oslo, Norway

=== Round-robin standings ===
Final round-robin standings

Key
Teams to Playoffs

Pool A	W	L
(Newfoundland and Labrador) Brad Gushue	3	1
(Norway) Thomas Ulsrud	3	1
(Alberta) Kevin Koe	3	1
(Quebec) Jean-Michel Ménard	1	3
(Saskatchewan) Steve Laycock	0	4

Pool B	W	L
(Ontario) Brad Jacobs	3	1
(Alberta) Pat Simmons	3	1
(Sweden) Niklas Edin	2	2
(Alberta) Brendan Bottcher	1	3
(Switzerland) Sven Michel	1	3

Pool C	W	L
(Manitoba) Reid Carruthers	3	1
(Ontario) John Epping	3	1
(Ontario) Glenn Howard	3	1
(Manitoba) Mike McEwen	1	3
(United States) John Shuster	0	4

=== Round-robin results ===
All draw times listed in Eastern Standard Time (UTC-5).

==== Draw 1 ====
Tuesday, November 10, 7:00 pm

Sheet B	1	2	3	4	5	6	7	8	Final
(Alberta) Kevin Koe 🔨	0	2	0	2	0	2	0	X	6
(Saskatchewan) Steve Laycock	0	0	1	0	2	0	1	X	4

Sheet E	1	2	3	4	5	6	7	8	Final
(Ontario) Brad Jacobs 🔨	3	0	4	0	X	X	X	X	7
(Switzerland) Sven Michel	0	1	0	2	X	X	X	X	3

==== Draw 2 ====
Wednesday, November 11, 8:30 am

Sheet B	1	2	3	4	5	6	7	8	Final
(Ontario) Glenn Howard 🔨	2	0	0	1	0	3	0	1	7
(United States) John Shuster	0	2	1	0	2	0	1	0	6

==== Draw 3 ====
Wednesday, November 11, 12:00 pm

Sheet A	1	2	3	4	5	6	7	8	Final
(Alberta) Kevin Koe 🔨	2	0	0	1	0	1	0	0	4
(Norway) Thomas Ulsrud	0	1	1	0	1	0	2	1	6

Sheet D	1	2	3	4	5	6	7	8	Final
(Manitoba) Reid Carruthers	0	0	2	0	1	0	2	0	5
(Ontario) John Epping 🔨	0	2	0	2	0	2	0	2	8

Sheet E	1	2	3	4	5	6	7	8	Final
(Sweden) Niklas Edin	0	1	0	2	0	1	0	X	4
(Alberta) Pat Simmons 🔨	2	0	2	0	3	0	1	X	8

==== Draw 4 ====
Wednesday, November 11, 3:30 pm

Sheet A	1	2	3	4	5	6	7	8	Final
(Manitoba) Mike McEwen 🔨	2	2	0	4	X	X	X	X	8
(United States) John Shuster	0	0	2	0	X	X	X	X	2

Sheet B	1	2	3	4	5	6	7	8	Final
(Alberta) Brendan Bottcher 🔨	0	1	0	0	1	0	X	X	2
(Switzerland) Sven Michel	1	0	2	2	0	3	X	X	8

Sheet D	1	2	3	4	5	6	7	8	Final
(Saskatchewan) Steve Laycock	0	1	0	1	0	2	0	1	5
(Newfoundland and Labrador) Brad Gushue 🔨	2	0	1	0	1	0	4	0	8

==== Draw 5 ====
Wednesday, November 11, 7:30 pm

Sheet A	1	2	3	4	5	6	7	8	Final
(Ontario) Glenn Howard	0	0	2	1	0	0	0	0	3
(Manitoba) Reid Carruthers 🔨	0	2	0	0	1	1	1	1	6

Sheet B	1	2	3	4	5	6	7	8	Final
(Ontario) Brad Jacobs	2	0	1	0	2	0	4	X	9
(Sweden) Niklas Edin 🔨	0	1	0	1	0	2	0	X	4

Sheet C	1	2	3	4	5	6	7	8	Final
(Quebec) Jean-Michel Ménard	0	0	0	2	0	1	0	X	3
(Norway) Thomas Ulsrud 🔨	3	1	1	0	2	0	2	X	9

==== Draw 6 ====
Thursday, November 12, 8:30 am

Sheet C	1	2	3	4	5	6	7	8	Final
(Alberta) Brendan Bottcher	0	1	0	0	1	0	2	2	6
(Alberta) Pat Simmons 🔨	1	0	1	0	0	1	0	0	3

==== Draw 7 ====
Thursday, November 12, 12:00 pm

Sheet A	1	2	3	4	5	6	7	8	Final
(Sweden) Niklas Edin 🔨	2	0	0	2	0	2	0	1	7
(Switzerland) Sven Michel	0	1	0	0	3	0	2	0	6

Sheet B	1	2	3	4	5	6	7	8	Final
(Ontario) John Epping 🔨	2	0	2	0	0	0	3	0	7
(Manitoba) Mike McEwen	0	2	0	1	0	1	0	1	5

Sheet C	1	2	3	4	5	6	7	8	Final
(Newfoundland and Labrador) Brad Gushue	0	2	0	3	0	0	1	X	6
(Alberta) Kevin Koe 🔨	3	0	2	0	1	3	0	X	9

Sheet E	1	2	3	4	5	6	7	8	Final
(Manitoba) Reid Carruthers 🔨	0	1	0	3	0	1	0	X	5
(United States) John Shuster	0	0	1	0	1	0	1	X	3

==== Draw 8 ====
Thursday, November 12, 3:30 pm

Sheet D	1	2	3	4	5	6	7	8	Final
(Ontario) Brad Jacobs 🔨	1	1	0	1	0	1	0	1	5
(Alberta) Brendan Bottcher	0	0	0	0	2	0	1	0	3

Sheet E	1	2	3	4	5	6	7	8	Final
(Saskatchewan) Steve Laycock 🔨	1	0	1	0	0	1	1	X	4
(Norway) Thomas Ulsrud	0	1	0	2	2	0	0	X	5

==== Draw 9 ====
Thursday, November 12, 7:30 pm

Sheet B	1	2	3	4	5	6	7	8	Final
(Alberta) Pat Simmons	1	1	0	0	2	0	2	1	7
(Switzerland) Sven Michel 🔨	0	0	0	2	0	1	0	0	3

Sheet C	1	2	3	4	5	6	7	8	9	Final
(Ontario) John Epping 🔨	1	0	0	0	1	0	0	1	0	3
(Ontario) Glenn Howard	0	0	0	1	0	2	0	0	1	4

Sheet D	1	2	3	4	5	6	7	8	Final
(Newfoundland and Labrador) Brad Gushue 🔨	0	2	0	0	2	0	0	3	7
(Quebec) Jean-Michel Ménard	0	0	1	0	0	0	2	0	3

==== Draw 10 ====
Friday, November 13, 8:30 am

Sheet B	1	2	3	4	5	6	7	8	Final
(Quebec) Jean-Michel Ménard 🔨	2	0	3	1	1	0	X	X	7
(Saskatchewan) Steve Laycock	0	1	0	0	0	1	X	X	2

Sheet C	1	2	3	4	5	6	7	8	Final
(Manitoba) Mike McEwen	0	2	0	0	3	0	2	0	7
(Manitoba) Reid Carruthers 🔨	3	0	1	1	0	2	0	1	8

==== Draw 11 ====
Friday, November 13, 12:00 pm

Sheet A	1	2	3	4	5	6	7	8	Final
(Newfoundland and Labrador) Brad Gushue 🔨	1	0	0	1	0	2	0	1	5
(Norway) Thomas Ulsrud	0	0	1	0	1	0	0	0	2

==== Draw 12 ====
Friday, November 13, 3:30 pm

Sheet A	1	2	3	4	5	6	7	8	Final
(Ontario) John Epping 🔨	0	2	0	5	2	X	X	X	9
(United States) John Shuster	1	0	1	0	0	X	X	X	2

Sheet B	1	2	3	4	5	6	7	8	Final
(Manitoba) Mike McEwen 🔨	0	0	0	2	0	1	1	0	4
(Ontario) Glenn Howard	1	1	1	0	1	0	0	1	5

Sheet C	1	2	3	4	5	6	7	8	Final
(Ontario) Brad Jacobs	0	1	0	0	0	1	0	X	2
(Alberta) Pat Simmons 🔨	1	0	0	0	3	0	2	X	7

Sheet D	1	2	3	4	5	6	7	8	Final
(Sweden) Niklas Edin 🔨	1	1	0	2	1	0	3	X	8
(Alberta) Brendan Bottcher	0	0	2	0	0	1	0	X	3

Sheet E	1	2	3	4	5	6	7	8	Final
(Alberta) Kevin Koe 🔨	2	0	2	1	0	2	3	X	10
(Quebec) Jean-Michel Ménard	0	3	0	0	1	0	0	X	4

=== Playoffs ===
Quarterfinals
1	(Ontario) Glenn Howard	5
8	(Alberta) Kevin Koe	4
4	(Manitoba) Reid Carruthers	7
5	(Ontario) Brad Jacobs	5
2	(Newfoundland and Labrador) Brad Gushue	9
7	(Norway) Thomas Ulsrud	4
3	(Ontario) John Epping	6
6	(Alberta) Pat Simmons	3

Semifinals
1	(Ontario) Glenn Howard	2
4	(Manitoba) Reid Carruthers	5
2	(Newfoundland and Labrador) Brad Gushue	8
3	(Ontario) John Epping	6

Final
4	(Manitoba) Reid Carruthers	2
2	(Newfoundland and Labrador) Brad Gushue	7

==== Quarterfinals ====
Saturday, November 14, 12:00 pm

Team	1	2	3	4	5	6	7	8	Final
(Ontario) Glenn Howard 🔨	2	0	0	1	0	0	0	2	5
(Alberta) Kevin Koe	0	0	2	0	0	2	0	0	4

Player percentages
(Ontario) Team Howard		(Alberta) Team Koe	
Scott Howard	82%	Ben Hebert	94%
Richard Hart	84%	Brent Laing	87%
Wayne Middaugh	89%	Marc Kennedy	89%
Glenn Howard	84%	Kevin Koe	100%
Total	85%	Total	92%

Team	1	2	3	4	5	6	7	8	Final
(Manitoba) Reid Carruthers	1	0	1	0	3	0	0	2	7
(Ontario) Brad Jacobs 🔨	0	1	0	1	0	2	1	0	5

Player percentages
(Manitoba) Team Carruthers		(Ontario) Team Jacobs	
Colin Hodgson	94%	Ryan Harnden	97%
Derek Samagalski	82%	E. J. Harnden	89%
Braeden Moskowy	94%	Ryan Fry	91%
Reid Carruthers	85%	Brad Jacobs	69%
Total	89%	Total	86%

Team	1	2	3	4	5	6	7	8	Final
(Newfoundland and Labrador) Brad Gushue	0	1	0	2	2	0	4	X	9
(Norway) Thomas Ulsrud 🔨	2	0	1	0	0	1	0	X	4

Player percentages
(Newfoundland and Labrador) Team Gushue		(Norway) Team Ulsrud	
Geoff Walker	100%	Håvard Vad Petersson	95%
Brett Gallant	96%	Christoffer Svae	97%
Mark Nichols	100%	Torger Nergård	99%
Brad Gushue	91%	Thomas Ulsrud	63%
Total	97%	Total	88%

Team	1	2	3	4	5	6	7	8	Final
(Ontario) John Epping	0	0	2	0	2	2	0	X	6
(Alberta) Pat Simmons 🔨	0	1	0	1	0	0	1	X	3

Player percentages
(Ontario) Team Epping		(Alberta) Team Simmons	
Tim March	96%	Nolan Thiessen	94%
Patrick Janssen	72%	Carter Rycroft	80%
Mathew Camm	95%	John Morris	82%
John Epping	99%	Pat Simmons	77%
Total	90%	Total	83%

==== Semifinals ====
Saturday, November 14, 7:30 pm

Sheet B	1	2	3	4	5	6	7	8	Final
(Ontario) Glenn Howard	0	0	0	1	0	0	1	0	2
(Manitoba) Reid Carruthers 🔨	0	1	2	0	0	1	0	1	5

Player percentages
(Ontario) Team Howard		(Manitoba) Team Carruthers	
Scott Howard	67%	Colin Hodgson	86%
Richard Hart	70%	Derek Samagalski	82%
Wayne Middaugh	78%	Braeden Moskowy	83%
Glenn Howard	75%	Reid Carruthers	82%
Total	72%	Total	83%

Sheet C	1	2	3	4	5	6	7	8	Final
(Newfoundland and Labrador) Brad Gushue 🔨	2	1	0	1	1	3	0	X	8
(Ontario) John Epping	0	0	4	0	0	0	2	X	6

Player percentages
(Newfoundland and Labrador) Team Gushue		(Ontario) Team Epping	
Geoff Walker	78%	Tim March	88%
Brett Gallant	84%	Patrick Janssen	78%
Mark Nichols	91%	Mathew Camm	66%
Brad Gushue	88%	John Epping	65%
Total	85%	Total	74%

==== Final ====
Sunday, November 15, 12:00 pm

Sheet C	1	2	3	4	5	6	7	8	Final
(Manitoba) Reid Carruthers 🔨	0	0	0	1	0	1	0	0	2
(Newfoundland and Labrador) Brad Gushue	0	1	0	0	2	0	1	3	7

Player percentages
(Manitoba) Team Carruthers		(Newfoundland and Labrador) Team Gushue	
Colin Hodgson	100%	Geoff Walker	89%
Derek Samagalski	93%	Brett Gallant	89%
Braeden Moskowy	74%	Mark Nichols	81%
Reid Carruthers	69%	Brad Gushue	92%
Total	84%	Total	88%

== Women ==
=== Teams ===
Skip	Third	Second	Lead	Locale
Chelsea Carey	Amy Nixon	Jocelyn Peterman	Laine Peters	Calgary, Alberta
Kerri Einarson	Selena Kaatz	Liz Fyfe	Kristin MacCuish	Winnipeg, Manitoba
Anna Hasselborg	Sara McManus	Agnes Knochenhauer	Sofia Mabergs	Stockholm, Sweden
Tracy Fleury	Crystal Webster	Jenna Walsh	Jenn Horgan	Sudbury, Ontario
Julie Hastings	Christy Trombley	Stacey Smith	Katrina Collins	Thornhill, Ontario
Rachel Homan	Emma Miskew	Joanne Courtney	Lisa Weagle	Ottawa, Ontario
Jennifer Jones	Kaitlyn Lawes	Jill Officer	Dawn McEwen	Winnipeg, Manitoba
Kim Eun-jung	Kim Kyeong-ae	Kim Seon-yeong	Kim Yeong-mi	Uiseong, South Korea
Stefanie Lawton	Trish Paulsen	Sherri Singler	Marliese Kasner	Saskatoon, Saskatchewan
Kristy McDonald	Kate Cameron	Leslie Wilson-Westcott	Raunora Westcott	Winnipeg, Manitoba
Sherry Middaugh	Jo-Ann Rizzo	Lee Merklinger	Leigh Armstrong	Coldwater, Ontario
Kelsey Rocque	Laura Crocker	Taylor McDonald	Jen Gates	Edmonton, Alberta
Jamie Sinclair	Becca Hamilton	Tara Peterson	Tabitha Peterson	(United States) Blaine, Minnesota
Val Sweeting	Lori Olson-Johns	Dana Ferguson	Rachelle Brown	Edmonton, Alberta
Silvana Tirinzoni	Manuela Siegrist	Esther Neuenschwander	Marlene Albrecht	Aarau, Switzerland

=== Round-robin standings ===
Final round-robin standings

Key
Teams to Playoffs
Teams to Tiebreakers

Pool A	W	L
(Ontario) Tracy Fleury	3	1
(Manitoba) Jennifer Jones	3	1
(Ontario) Sherry Middaugh	2	2
(Ontario) Julie Hastings	1	3
(South Korea) Kim Eun-jung	1	3

Pool B	W	L
(Ontario) Rachel Homan	4	0
(Alberta) Kelsey Rocque	2	2
(Manitoba) Kerri Einarson	2	2
(Sweden) Anna Hasselborg	1	3
(Alberta) Chelsea Carey	1	3

Pool C	W	L
(Saskatchewan) Stefanie Lawton	3	1
(Alberta) Val Sweeting	3	1
(Manitoba) Kristy McDonald	2	2
(Switzerland) Silvana Tirinzoni	2	2
(United States) Jamie Sinclair	0	4

=== Round-robin results ===
All draw times listed in Eastern Standard Time (UTC-5).

==== Draw 1 ====
Tuesday, November 10, 7:00 pm

Sheet D	1	2	3	4	5	6	7	8	Final
(Ontario) Rachel Homan 🔨	0	1	2	0	0	3	X	X	6
(Sweden) Anna Hasselborg	0	0	0	1	0	0	X	X	1

==== Draw 2 ====
Wednesday, November 11, 8:30 am

Sheet A	1	2	3	4	5	6	7	8	Final
(Alberta) Chelsea Carey	1	2	1	0	0	0	1	0	5
(Manitoba) Kerri Einarson 🔨	0	0	0	2	1	0	0	3	6

Sheet C	1	2	3	4	5	6	7	8	9	Final
(Alberta) Val Sweeting	0	1	2	0	0	2	1	0	1	7
(Manitoba) Kristy McDonald 🔨	1	0	0	1	2	0	0	2	0	6

Sheet D	1	2	3	4	5	6	7	8	9	Final
(Switzerland) Silvana Tirinzoni 🔨	0	0	2	0	0	4	1	0	1	8
(Saskatchewan) Stefanie Lawton	1	2	0	1	1	0	0	2	0	7

Sheet E	1	2	3	4	5	6	7	8	Final
(Alberta) Kelsey Rocque 🔨	1	1	0	2	0	2	1	X	7
(Sweden) Anna Hasselborg	0	0	1	0	1	0	0	X	2

==== Draw 3 ====
Wednesday, November 11, 12:00 pm

Sheet B	1	2	3	4	5	6	7	8	Final
(Ontario) Tracy Fleury	0	0	1	0	0	2	0	X	3
(South Korea) Kim Eun-jung 🔨	4	1	0	1	1	0	1	X	8

Sheet C	1	2	3	4	5	6	7	8	Final
(Manitoba) Jennifer Jones	0	0	1	3	0	3	0	X	7
(Ontario) Julie Hastings 🔨	2	1	0	0	1	0	1	X	5

==== Draw 4 ====
Wednesday, November 11, 3:30 pm

Sheet C	1	2	3	4	5	6	7	8	9	Final
(Ontario) Rachel Homan 🔨	0	0	1	1	1	0	2	0	2	7
(Alberta) Chelsea Carey	0	2	0	0	0	1	0	2	0	5

Sheet E	1	2	3	4	5	6	7	8	Final
(Alberta) Val Sweeting	0	2	0	2	1	0	3	X	8
(United States) Jamie Sinclair 🔨	1	0	1	0	0	1	0	X	3

==== Draw 5 ====
Wednesday, November 11, 7:30 pm

Sheet D	1	2	3	4	5	6	7	8	9	Final
(Ontario) Tracy Fleury	0	2	0	0	1	1	1	0	1	6
(Ontario) Sherry Middaugh 🔨	2	0	0	1	0	0	0	2	0	5

Sheet E	1	2	3	4	5	6	7	8	Final
(Saskatchewan) Stefanie Lawton 🔨	2	0	1	2	0	2	0	0	7
(Manitoba) Kristy McDonald	0	2	0	0	1	0	1	2	6

==== Draw 6 ====
Thursday, November 12, 8:30 am

Sheet A	1	2	3	4	5	6	7	8	Final
(Manitoba) Jennifer Jones 🔨	2	2	0	5	X	X	X	X	9
(South Korea) Kim Eun-jung	0	0	1	0	X	X	X	X	1

Sheet B	1	2	3	4	5	6	7	8	Final
(Ontario) Sherry Middaugh	0	1	0	1	0	0	0	1	3
(Ontario) Julie Hastings 🔨	0	0	1	0	1	1	2	0	5

Sheet D	1	2	3	4	5	6	7	8	Final
(Manitoba) Kristy McDonald 🔨	0	0	0	0	2	1	0	1	4
(United States) Jamie Sinclair	0	1	0	0	0	0	1	0	2

Sheet E	1	2	3	4	5	6	7	8	Final
(Alberta) Chelsea Carey 🔨	0	2	0	1	0	1	0	1	5
(Alberta) Kelsey Rocque	0	0	1	0	1	0	1	0	3

==== Draw 7 ====
Thursday, November 12, 12:00 pm

Sheet D	1	2	3	4	5	6	7	8	Final
(Manitoba) Kerri Einarson 🔨	1	0	1	0	2	0	X	X	4
(Ontario) Rachel Homan	0	3	0	2	0	4	X	X	9

==== Draw 8 ====
Thursday, November 12, 3:30 pm

Sheet A	1	2	3	4	5	6	7	8	Final
(Ontario) Tracy Fleury	1	1	0	7	X	X	X	X	9
(Ontario) Julie Hastings 🔨	0	0	1	0	X	X	X	X	1

Sheet B	1	2	3	4	5	6	7	8	9	Final
(Alberta) Val Sweeting 🔨	0	1	1	0	1	0	0	0	1	4
(Switzerland) Silvana Tirinzoni	0	0	0	1	0	1	0	1	0	3

Sheet C	1	2	3	4	5	6	7	8	9	Final
(Manitoba) Jennifer Jones 🔨	1	0	2	0	2	0	1	0	1	7
(Ontario) Sherry Middaugh	0	3	0	1	0	1	0	1	0	6

==== Draw 9 ====
Thursday, November 12, 7:30 pm

Sheet A	1	2	3	4	5	6	7	8	9	Final
(Sweden) Anna Hasselborg 🔨	0	3	0	0	2	0	0	1	0	6
(Manitoba) Kerri Einarson	0	0	0	2	0	3	1	0	1	7

Sheet E	1	2	3	4	5	6	7	8	Final
(Saskatchewan) Stefanie Lawton 🔨	0	0	1	2	0	0	0	1	4
(United States) Jamie Sinclair	1	1	0	0	1	0	0	0	3

==== Draw 10 ====
Friday, November 13, 8:30 am

Sheet D	1	2	3	4	5	6	7	8	Final
(South Korea) Kim Eun-jung	1	0	0	0	0	0	X	X	1
(Ontario) Julie Hastings 🔨	0	2	0	2	1	1	X	X	6

==== Draw 11 ====
Friday, November 13, 12:00 pm

Sheet B	1	2	3	4	5	6	7	8	Final
(Alberta) Kelsey Rocque 🔨	0	2	0	0	1	0	1	3	7
(Manitoba) Kerri Einarson	0	0	1	0	0	1	0	0	2

Sheet C	1	2	3	4	5	6	7	8	Final
(Alberta) Val Sweeting	0	1	1	0	0	2	0	0	4
(Saskatchewan) Stefanie Lawton 🔨	1	0	0	1	1	0	2	2	7

Sheet D	1	2	3	4	5	6	7	8	Final
(Alberta) Chelsea Carey 🔨	0	3	0	1	0	1	0	0	5
(Sweden) Anna Hasselborg	0	0	2	0	1	0	4	1	8

Sheet E	1	2	3	4	5	6	7	8	Final
(Switzerland) Silvana Tirinzoni	0	0	1	0	0	0	X	X	1
(Manitoba) Kristy McDonald 🔨	0	1	0	2	1	3	X	X	7

==== Draw 13 ====
Friday, November 13, 7:30 pm

Sheet A	1	2	3	4	5	6	7	8	Final
(Switzerland) Silvana Tirinzoni 🔨	1	1	0	2	0	5	0	X	9
(United States) Jamie Sinclair	0	0	1	0	3	0	1	X	5

Sheet B	1	2	3	4	5	6	7	8	Final
(Ontario) Sherry Middaugh	0	0	2	0	1	1	2	X	6
(South Korea) Kim Eun-jung 🔨	0	2	0	1	0	0	0	X	3

Sheet C	1	2	3	4	5	6	7	8	Final
(Ontario) Rachel Homan 🔨	0	2	0	2	1	2	X	X	7
(Alberta) Kelsey Rocque	0	0	1	0	0	0	X	X	1

Sheet D	1	2	3	4	5	6	7	8	Final
(Manitoba) Jennifer Jones 🔨	2	0	0	0	2	0	0	0	4
(Ontario) Tracy Fleury	0	2	1	0	0	1	0	2	6

=== Tiebreakers ===
Saturday, November 14, 8:30 am

Team	1	2	3	4	5	6	7	8	Final
(Manitoba) Kerri Einarson 🔨	1	0	1	1	0	4	0	0	7
(Alberta) Kelsey Rocque	0	2	0	0	3	0	2	1	8

Player percentages
(Manitoba) Team Einarson		(Alberta) Team Rocque	
Kristin MacCuish	76%	Jen Gates	83%
Liz Fyfe	84%	Taylor McDonald	73%
Selena Kaatz	63%	Laura Crocker	79%
Kerri Einarson	74%	Kelsey Rocque	79%
Total	74%	Total	78%

Team	1	2	3	4	5	6	7	8	Final
(Manitoba) Kristy McDonald 🔨	0	2	1	0	2	0	3	X	8
(Switzerland) Silvana Tirinzoni	0	0	0	2	0	1	0	X	3

Player percentages
(Manitoba) Team McDonald		(Switzerland) Team Tirinzoni	
Raunora Westcott	93%	Marlene Albrecht	84%
Leslie Wilson-Westcott	78%	Esther Neuenschwander	68%
Kate Cameron	77%	Manuela Siegrist	84%
Kristy McDonald	97%	Silvana Tirinzoni	84%
Total	86%	Total	80%

=== Playoffs ===
Quarterfinals
1	(Ontario) Rachel Homan	5
8	(Alberta) Kelsey Rocque	4
4	(Manitoba) Jennifer Jones	5
5	(Saskatchewan) Stefanie Lawton	6
2	(Ontario) Tracy Fleury	8
7	(Manitoba) Kristy McDonald	4
3	(Alberta) Val Sweeting	5
6	(Ontario) Sherry Middaugh	4

Semifinals
1	(Ontario) Rachel Homan	5
5	(Saskatchewan) Stefanie Lawton	3
2	(Ontario) Tracy Fleury	9
3	(Alberta) Val Sweeting	1

Final
1	(Ontario) Rachel Homan	5
2	(Ontario) Tracy Fleury	4

==== Quarterfinals ====
Saturday, November 14, 4:00 pm

Team	1	2	3	4	5	6	7	8	Final
(Ontario) Rachel Homan 🔨	0	1	1	0	2	1	0	0	5
(Alberta) Kelsey Rocque	0	0	0	2	0	0	1	1	4

Player percentages
(Ontario) Team Homan		(Alberta) Team Rocque	
Lisa Weagle	83%	Jen Gates	89%
Joanne Courtney	92%	Taylor McDonald	74%
Emma Miskew	89%	Laura Crocker	79%
Rachel Homan	89%	Kelsey Rocque	79%
Total	88%	Total	80%

Team	1	2	3	4	5	6	7	8	Final
(Manitoba) Jennifer Jones	0	2	0	1	0	1	0	1	5
(Saskatchewan) Stefanie Lawton 🔨	1	0	1	0	2	0	2	0	6

Player percentages
(Manitoba) Team Jones		(Saskatchewan) Team Lawton	
Dawn McEwen	85%	Marliese Kasner	56%
Jill Officer	74%	Sherri Singler	75%
Kaitlyn Lawes	74%	Trish Paulsen	71%
Jennifer Jones	71%	Stefanie Lawton	78%
Total	76%	Total	70%

Team	1	2	3	4	5	6	7	8	Final
(Ontario) Tracy Fleury 🔨	0	3	0	1	1	0	1	2	8
(Manitoba) Kristy McDonald	0	0	1	0	0	3	0	0	4

Player percentages
(Ontario) Team Fleury		(Manitoba) Team McDonald	
Jenn Horgan	67%	Raunora Westcott	80%
Jenna Walsh	80%	Leslie Wilson-Westcott	76%
Crystal Webster	50%	Kate Cameron	73%
Tracy Fleury	69%	Kristy McDonald	73%
Total	66%	Total	75%

Team	1	2	3	4	5	6	7	8	Final
(Alberta) Val Sweeting 🔨	0	1	0	2	0	1	0	1	5
(Ontario) Sherry Middaugh	0	0	1	0	1	0	2	0	4

Player percentages
(Alberta) Team Sweeting		(Ontario) Team Middaugh	
Rachelle Brown	100%	Leigh Armstrong	84%
Dana Ferguson	84%	Lee Merklinger	68%
Lori Olson-Johns	92%	Jo-Ann Rizzo	90%
Val Sweeting	85%	Sherry Middaugh	94%
Total	90%	Total	84%

==== Semifinals ====
Saturday, November 14, 7:30 pm

Sheet A	1	2	3	4	5	6	7	8	Final
(Ontario) Tracy Fleury	0	1	5	0	3	X	X	X	9
(Alberta) Val Sweeting 🔨	0	0	0	1	0	X	X	X	1

Player percentages
(Ontario) Team Fleury		(Alberta) Team Sweeting	
Jenn Horgan	80%	Rachelle Brown	83%
Jenna Walsh	71%	Dana Ferguson	71%
Crystal Webster	98%	Lori Olson-Johns	57%
Tracy Fleury	87%	Val Sweeting	38%
Total	84%	Total	62%

Sheet D	1	2	3	4	5	6	7	8	Final
(Manitoba) Rachel Homan 🔨	1	0	0	2	1	0	0	1	5
(Saskatchewan) Stefanie Lawton	0	1	1	0	0	1	0	0	3

Player percentages
(Ontario) Team Homan		(Saskatchewan) Team Lawton	
Lisa Weagle	83%	Marliese Kasner	78%
Joanne Courtney	87%	Sherri Singler	80%
Emma Miskew	92%	Trish Paulsen	75%
Rachel Homan	95%	Stefanie Lawton	71%
Total	89%	Total	76%

==== Final ====
Sunday, November 15, 4:00 pm

Sheet C	1	2	3	4	5	6	7	8	Final
(Ontario) Rachel Homan 🔨	0	1	0	0	2	0	0	2	5
(Ontario) Tracy Fleury	0	0	0	1	0	2	1	0	4

Player percentages
(Ontario) Team Homan		(Ontario) Team Fleury	
Lisa Weagle	86%	Jenn Horgan	85%
Joanne Courtney	75%	Jenna Walsh	71%
Emma Miskew	78%	Crystal Webster	79%
Rachel Homan	85%	Tracy Fleury	83%
Total	81%	Total	80%
