= 2015 Northern Ontario Scotties Tournament of Hearts =

- Host city: Thunder Bay, Ontario
- Arena: Fort William Curling Club
- Dates: January 15–18
- Winner: Team Horgan
- Curling club: Idylwylde G&CC, Sudbury
- Skip: Tracy Horgan
- Third: Jenn Horgan
- Second: Jenna Enge
- Lead: Amanda Gates
- Finalist: Kendra Lilly

The 2015 Northern Ontario Scotties Tournament of Hearts was held from January 15 to 18 at the Fort William Curling Club in Thunder Bay, Ontario. The winning team of Tracy Horgan represented Northern Ontario at the 2015 Scotties Tournament of Hearts in Moose Jaw, Saskatchewan. The event marked the first year that Northern Ontario had a direct entry to the national Scotties bonspiel. Before 2015, the top four teams qualified for the Ontario Scotties Tournament of Hearts.

== Teams ==
Skip	Third	Second	Lead	Club
Liane Fossum	Megan St. Amand	Kim Zsakai	Victoria Anderson	Fort William CC, Thunder Bay
Tracy Horgan	Jenn Horgan	Jenna Enge	Amanda Gates	Idylwylde G&CC, Sudbury
Kendra Lilly	Sarah Potts	Oye-Sem Won Briand	Tirzah Keffer	Fort William CC, Thunder Bay
Laura Payne	Stephanie Brown	Laura Forget	Amanda Corkal	North Bay Granite CC, North Bay
Jessica Williams	Carly Angers	JoAnne Come-Forget	Megan Westlund	Fort William CC, Thunder Bay

== Standings ==
Skip (Club)	W	L	PF	PA	Ends Won	Ends Lost	Blank Ends	Stolen Ends
Tracy Horgan (Idylwylde)	4	0	24	18	17	13	7	5
Kendra Lilly (Fort William)	3	1	23	20	14	17	3	2
Laura Payne (North Bay Granite)	2	2	24	23	18	16	4	4
Jessica Williams (Fort William)	1	3	20	24	16	17	0	4
Liane Fossum (Fort William)	0	4	23	29	17	19	4	1

== Scores ==
=== Draw 1 ===
Thursday, January 15, 10:00 a.m. EST

Sheet 3	1	2	3	4	5	6	7	8	9	10	Final
Tracy Horgan 🔨	1	0	0	0	0	1	0	2	3	X	7
Jessica Williams	0	1	0	1	2	0	1	0	0	X	5

Sheet 4	1	2	3	4	5	6	7	8	9	10	11	Final
Liane Fossum 🔨	1	0	0	1	0	0	2	1	0	1	0	6
Laura Payne	0	3	1	0	0	1	0	0	1	0	1	7

=== Draw 2 ===
Thursday, January 15, 4:00 p.m. EST

Sheet 3	1	2	3	4	5	6	7	8	9	10	Final
Liane Fossum 🔨	0	0	1	0	1	0	1	0	2	X	5
Kendra Lilly	0	0	0	5	0	1	0	1	0	X	7

Sheet 5	1	2	3	4	5	6	7	8	9	10	Final
Laura Payne 🔨	1	0	1	0	0	0	3	1	0	1	7
Jessica Williams	0	1	0	2	0	0	0	0	1	0	4

=== Draw 3 ===
Friday, January 16, 12:00 p.m. EST

Sheet 4	1	2	3	4	5	6	7	8	9	10	Final
Jessica Williams 🔨	1	0	0	1	0	1	0	0	1	0	4
Kendra Lilly	0	0	0	0	1	0	2	1	0	1	5

Sheet 6	1	2	3	4	5	6	7	8	9	10	Final
Laura Payne	0	1	0	0	0	1	0	1	0	0	3
Tracy Horgan 🔨	1	0	0	2	0	0	0	0	0	2	5

=== Draw 4 ===
Friday, January 16, 8:00 p.m. EST

Sheet 5	1	2	3	4	5	6	7	8	9	10	Final
Kendra Lilly	0	2	0	0	0	1	0	0	0	0	3
Tracy Horgan 🔨	0	0	0	0	1	0	1	0	1	1	4

Sheet 6	1	2	3	4	5	6	7	8	9	10	11	Final
Jessica Williams	0	2	0	0	1	0	1	1	0	0	2	7
Liane Fossum 🔨	1	0	0	1	0	2	0	0	0	1	0	5

=== Draw 5 ===
Saturday, January 17, 9:30 a.m. EST

Sheet 3	1	2	3	4	5	6	7	8	9	10	Final
Laura Payne	0	1	0	1	1	0	2	0	2	0	7
Kendra Lilly 🔨	2	0	2	0	0	2	0	1	0	1	8

Sheet 4	1	2	3	4	5	6	7	8	9	10	Final
Liane Fossum 🔨	2	0	0	0	1	0	3	0	1	0	7
Tracy Horgan	0	1	1	1	0	2	0	1	0	2	8

== Final ==
Saturday, January 17, 8:00 p.m. EST

Sheet 4	1	2	3	4	5	6	7	8	9	10	Final
Tracy Horgan 🔨	2	0	0	0	0	1	0	0	0	1	4
Kendra Lilly	0	2	0	0	0	0	0	0	1	0	3

2015 Northern Ontario Scotties Tournament of Hearts

Tracy Horgan
5th Northern Ontario Women's Championship title
