= Jennifer Wylie =

Canadian curler

- Curler
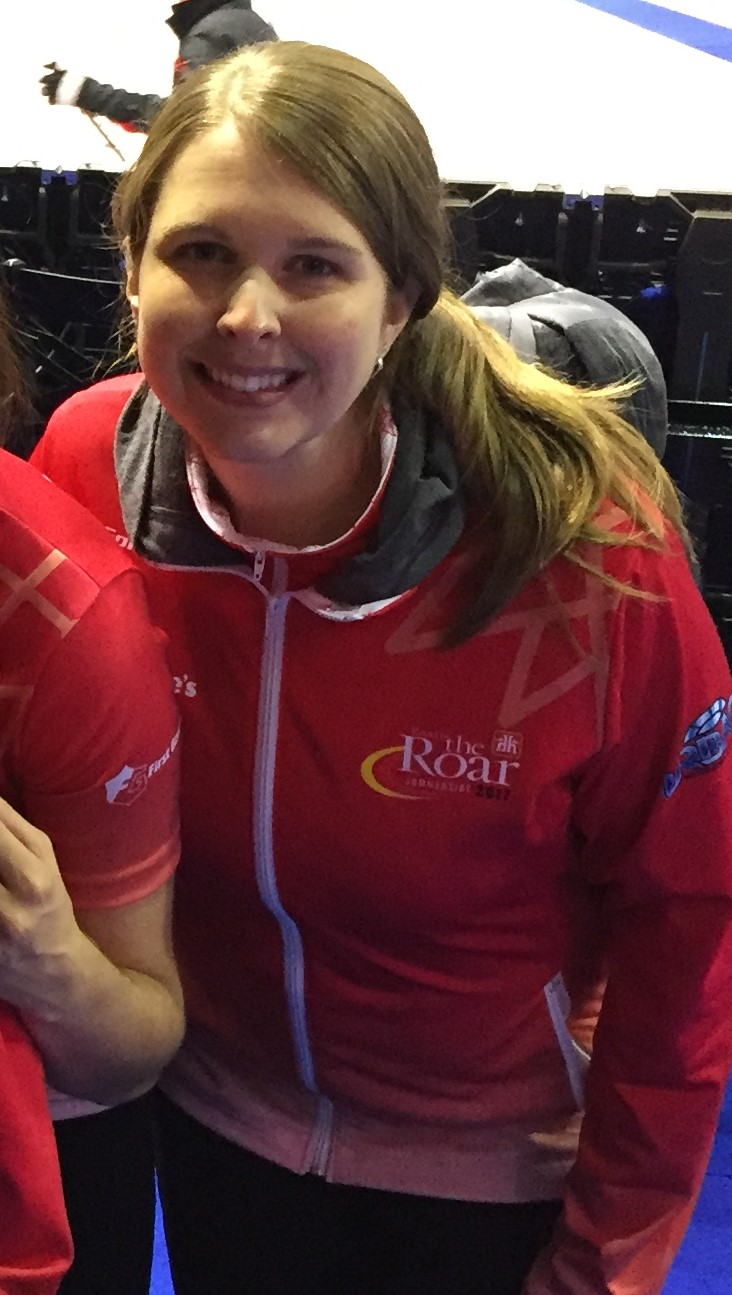
- Wylie at the 2017 Canadian Olympic Curling Pre-Trials
- Other names: Jennifer Seabrook
- Born: Jennifer Horgan; August 1, 1984 (age 42); Sudbury, Ontario

Team
- Curling club: Idylwylde G&CC, Sudbury, ON

Curling career
- Member Association: Northern Ontario
- Hearts: 3 (2012, 2015, 2018)
- Top CTRS ranking: 7th (2015–16, 2016–17)

Jennifer Wylie (born August 1, 1984) is a Canadian curler from Sudbury, Ontario.

== Career ==
=== Juniors ===
Wylie was born in Sudbury, Ontario. She is the 2005 Northern Ontario junior champion.

In 2005, Wylie skipped the Northern Ontario team, but did not throw last stones. Instead, her sister Tracy Fleury did. At the 2005 Canadian Junior Curling Championships, Wylie and her team finished with a 7-5 record, just out of the playoffs.

=== 2008–2013 ===
In 2008, Wylie's team graduated to the women's level, and the team qualified for the 2008 Ontario Scotties Tournament of Hearts. The team finished with a 3-6 record.

Wylie's rink qualified for the 2009 Ontario Scotties Tournament of Hearts, having lost to Krista McCarville in the Northern Ontario final, which was good enough to qualify. The team finished in 8th place with a 4-5 record.

Wylie also won the Northern Ontario championship in December 2009, which earned her team a right to play in the 2010 Ontario Scotties Tournament of Hearts. There, her rink went all the way to the final before losing to McCarville.

Wylie's rink returned to the 2011 Ontario Scotties Tournament of Hearts by winning the fourth and final slot at the Northern Ontario championship. They did much better at the provincial tournament, but were once again bested by the McCarville rink, this time in the semi-final.

Wylie's team (Team Fleury, then known as Team Horgan) had another slow start in their 2012 campaign, placing third at the Northern Ontario championship. However, they would have another successful tournament at that year's 2012 Ontario Scotties Tournament of Hearts. The team lost just two round robin games, and would eventually upset the previously undefeated Rachel Homan rink in the final. Homan missed a draw to the button to win the game on her last rock. At the 2012 Scotties Tournament of Hearts, the team would find difficulties through the week, finishing round robin with a 4-7 record.

Wylie's rink began the 2012-13 curling season well by winning the 2012 AMJ Campbell Shorty Jenkins Classic. However, the team's bid to return to the Scotties at the provincial 2013 Ontario Scotties Tournament of Hearts was unsuccessful, finishing round robin play with a 4-5 record, missing the playoffs. At the 2013 Pomeroy Inn & Suites Prairie Showdown, the team went all the way to the finals, before losing in an extra end to Mirjam Ott, the World Champion at the time.

=== 2013–2018 ===
The Fleury rink secured a spot at the 2013 Road to the Roar, the Olympic pre-trials event. At the Road to the Roar, the team went 4–3 and lost the 'C' event final on last rock to Val Sweeting, who qualified for the Roar along with Renée Sonnenberg. Fleury defeated the top two seeds at the event, Shannon Kleibrink and Laura Crocker. Following the Pre-Trials, the team went undefeated at the Northern Ontario Scotties playdowns. By finishing first at the playdowns, the team competed at the 2014 Ontario Scotties Tournament of Hearts in Sault Ste. Marie, Ontario. The team had a disappointing run at the provincials that year, giving up key steals in their losses to finish with a 5–4 record and ultimately missing the playoffs for a second consecutive year.

The team was selected to represent Canada at the third annual Yichun International Ladies Cup in Yichun, China from December 28, 2013 – January 1, 2014. The team went 6–1 in the round-robin with their only loss coming from Silvana Tirinzoni of Switzerland in the opening draw. The team defeated Wang Bingyu in the semifinal and Jiang Yilun in the final to win the event.

The team has had a successful start to their 2014–15 season, finishing third at the Stroud Sleeman Cash Spiel and qualifying for the playoffs of a Grand Slam event, the 2014 Curlers Corner Autumn Gold Curling Classic for a second time in their career making it to the quarterfinal before losing to former provincial rival Rachel Homan of Ottawa. At the 2014 DEKALB Superspiel in Morris, Manitoba, the team lost their opening match to Colleen Kilgallen before winning their next eight games. They defeated St. Vital's Jennifer Jones in the final and earned 22.5 CTRS Points for their win. Just three weeks later, at the Curl Mesabi Classic, the Fleury rink finished first in their pool after the round-robin with a 3–1 record. In the playoffs, they defeated Patti Lank in the semifinal and defeated Erika Brown in the final to claim the championship title. At the 2015 Northern Ontario Scotties Tournament of Hearts, the Fleury rink became the first women's team to represent Northern Ontario at the Scotties. The team finished the tournament with a perfect 5–0 record, defeating city rival Kendra Lilly 4–3 in a close match. Team Fleury then had to win a relegation qualifier prior to the 2015 Scotties Tournament of Hearts in order to compete in the main tournament.

During the relegation round at the 2015 Scotties Tournament of Hearts, they defeated Kerry Galusha from the Northwest Territories 10–5 and then beat Sarah Koltun from the Yukon 7–5. In the pre-qualification final, they once again defeated the team from Yellowknife, 7–6, securing the right to represent Northern Ontario in the main draw at the Scotties for the first time. In the main event, they found some success defeating higher seeds such as Julie Hastings and Stefanie Lawton. Headed into draw seventeen, the final draw before playoffs, Northern Ontario and Rachel Homan, Team Canada at the time, shared 6–4 records. The winner of their game would determine the fourth seed for playoffs, and the loser would be eliminated. After leading 4–2 after six ends, they would allow Homan to score two points in the seventh end to tie the game. After a blank in the eighth, Fleury was heavy on a tap attempt in the ninth end and gave up a steal of two points. Homan would run them out of stones in the tenth end to win 6–5. Therefore, Northern Ontario finished fifth at the 2015 event with a 6–5 record.

After the conclusion of the 2014–15 season, Team Fleury announced that they would add Calgary's Crystal Webster to the lineup in a five-player rotation due to work commitments. The team found success early, advancing all the way to the semifinal of the 2015 Tour Challenge Grand Slam. They finished the round robin with a 2–2 record with wins over Eve Muirhead and Kim Eun-jung, qualifying for a tiebreaker. The team stole the 8th end of the tiebreaker against Chelsea Carey and went on to defeat Sherry Middaugh in the quarterfinal. They were defeated by Switzerland's Silvana Tirinzoni 9–7 in the semifinal to end their run in the slam. It marked the first time Team Fleury advanced to the semifinal of a Slam. Although the team struggled at the next Slam, The Masters, finishing with a 1–3 record, they quickly rebounded and made it all the way to the final of The National. Up 4–3 without hammer in the eighth and final end, the team forced Rachel Homan to execute a difficult draw to the four-foot through a port to win, which was made. A month later, they played in the 2015 Canada Cup of Curling, where they went 1–5. In their next slam, the team lost in the quarterfinals of the 2015 Meridian Canadian Open. In playdowns, the team failed in their attempt to repeat as Northern Ontario champions, losing to Krista McCarville in the final. They wrapped up their season at the 2016 Players' Championship, where they finished with a 1–4 record. The team's success from the season left them in seventh spot on the Canadian Team Ranking System.

Team Fleury began the 2016–17 Grand Slam season at the 2016 WFG Masters, going 1–3 at the event. A month later, the team lost in the quarterfinals of the 2016 Tour Challenge. Later that month, they picked up a win at The Sunova Spiel at East St. Paul World Curling Tour event. A week later, they played in the 2016 Canada Cup of Curling, which they finished with a 2–4 record. At their next slam, the 2016 National, they missed the playoffs again with a 1–3 record. They were more successful at the 2017 Meridian Canadian Open, where they lost in the quarterfinal. At the 2017 Northern Ontario Scotties Tournament of Hearts, they again lost in the final to the Krista McCarville rink. The team finished their season with another quarterfinal finish at the 2017 Players' Championship.

The team began the 2017–18 season at the 2017 Tour Challenge, where they finished with a winless 0–4 record. The next month, they picked up a tour event win at the Gord Carroll Curling Classic. After three seasons as one of the top teams in Canada, Team Fleury qualified for the 2017 Canadian Olympic Curling Pre-Trials as the number one seed. At the Pre-trials, they finished with a disappointing 2–4 record, missing the playoffs. A week later, the team rebounded by making it all the way to the semifinal of the 2017 National Grand Slam event. The team regrouped at the 2018 Northern Ontario Scotties Tournament of Hearts, defeating Krista McCarville in the final to qualify for the 2018 Scotties Tournament of Hearts. The team would finish round-robin and championship pool play with an 8–3 record, in fourth place and a spot in the playoffs. They would lose the 3 vs. 4 page playoff game to Mary-Anne Arsenault of Nova Scotia, eliminating them from the tournament. A few weeks later, the team announced they would disband at the end of the 2017–18 season, citing work and family commitments.

== Personal life ==
Wylie is employed as a chartered accountant. Her brothers Tanner and Jacob are also successful Northern Ontario junior curlers, winning silver medals at the 2016 and 2018 Canadian Junior Curling Championships and a bronze medal in 2017. Jacob also won the 2017 Canadian U18 Curling Championships. She is married to Steve Wylie and has two children, Kolton and Madison.

== Teams ==
Season	Skip	Third	Second	Lead	Alternate
2010–11	Tracy Horgan	Jennifer Seabrook	Jenna Enge	Amanda Gates	
2011–12	Tracy Horgan	Jennifer Seabrook	Jenna Enge	Amanda Gates	Jen Gates (STOH)
2012–13	Tracy Horgan	Jennifer Horgan	Jenna Enge	Amanda Gates	
2013–14	Tracy Horgan	Jennifer Horgan	Jenna Enge	Amanda Gates	Kendra Lilly (RTTR)
2014–15	Tracy Horgan	Jennifer Horgan	Jenna Enge	Amanda Gates	Courtney Chenier
2015–16	Tracy Fleury	Jennifer Horgan	Jenna Walsh	Amanda Gates	Crystal Webster
2016–17	Tracy Fleury	Jennifer Wylie	Jenna Walsh	Amanda Gates	Crystal Webster
2017–18	Tracy Fleury	Crystal Webster	Jenna Walsh	Amanda Gates	Jennifer Wylie
