= 2017 Boost National =

Grand Slam of Curling event

2017 BOOST National
- Host city: Sault Ste. Marie, Ontario
- Arena: Essar Centre
- Dates: November 14–19
- Men's winner: (Scotland) Team Mouat
- Curling club: Gogar Park CC, Edinburgh
- Skip: Bruce Mouat
- Third: Grant Hardie
- Second: Bobby Lammie
- Lead: Hammy McMillan Jr.
- Finalist: (South Korea) Kim Chang-Min
- Women's winner: (Manitoba) Team Jones
- Curling club: St. Vital CC, Winnipeg
- Skip: Jennifer Jones
- Third: Kaitlyn Lawes
- Second: Jill Officer
- Lead: Dawn McEwen
- Finalist: (Alberta) Casey Scheidegger

The 2017 BOOST National was held from November 14 to 19 at the Essar Centre in Sault Ste. Marie, Ontario. This was the third Grand Slam of Curling event of the 2017–18 curling season.

Many of the top European teams on the World Curling Tour could not attend, as they are playing in the 2017 European Curling Championships while the top American teams on the Tour are playing in the 2017 United States Olympic Curling Trials.

In the men's final, Team Bruce Mouat from Scotland won their first career Grand Slam title against the South Korean Olympic team, skipped by Kim Chang-min, who was playing in their first Grand Slam ever. The final was only the second men's final to not feature a Canadian team, and Mouat became the second non-Canadian skip to win a men's Grand Slam event and at the age of 23, became the youngest men's skip ever to win a Grand Slam event, eclipsing John Morris who won the 2004 Players' Championship at the age of 25.

In the women's final, the defending Olympic champion Jennifer Jones and her Winnipeg rink defeated Lethbridge's Casey Scheidegger to win her 15th career grand slam, her second in a row.

== Men ==
=== Teams ===
Skip	Third	Second	Lead	Locale	OOM rank
Greg Balsdon	Don Bowser	Jonathan Beuk	Scott Chadwick	Kingston, Ontario	19
Reid Carruthers	Braeden Moskowy	Derek Samagalski	Colin Hodgson	Winnipeg, Manitoba	4
Ross Paterson (Fourth)	Greg Drummond (Skip)	Gregor Cannon	Michael Goodfellow	Stirling, Scotland	21
John Epping	Mat Camm	Pat Janssen	Tim March	Toronto, Ontario	8
Jason Gunnlaugson	Alex Forrest	Ian McMillan	Connor Njegovan	Winnipeg, Manitoba	12
Brad Gushue	Mark Nichols	Brett Gallant	Geoff Walker	St. John's, Newfoundland and Labrador	2
Brad Jacobs	Ryan Fry	E. J. Harnden	Ryan Harnden	Sault Ste. Marie, Ontario	3
Kim Chang-min	Seong Se-hyeon	Oh Eun-su	Lee Ki-bok	Uiseong, South Korea	25
Kevin Koe	Marc Kennedy	Brent Laing	Ben Hebert	Calgary, Alberta	5
Liu Rui	Xu Xiaoming	Jiang Dongxu	Zang Jialiang	Harbin, China	16
William Lyburn	Mark Kean (Note: Kean replaced Richard Daneault.)	Jared Kolomaya	Jim Coleman (Note: Coleman replaced Braeden Zawada.)	Winnipeg, Manitoba	24
Mike McEwen	B. J. Neufeld	Matt Wozniak	Denni Neufeld	Winnipeg, Manitoba	6
John Morris	Jim Cotter	Catlin Schneider	Tyrel Griffith	Vernon, British Columbia	11
Bruce Mouat	Grant Hardie	Bobby Lammie	Hammy McMillan Jr.	Edinburgh, Scotland	23
Pat Simmons	Colton Lott	Kyle Doering	Rob Gordon	Winnipeg, Manitoba	17

=== Round-robin standings ===
Final round-robin standings

Key
Teams to Playoffs
Teams to Tiebreakers

Pool A	W	L	PF	PA
(Newfoundland and Labrador) Brad Gushue	3	1	23	23
(Scotland) Bruce Mouat	2	2	24	20
(Manitoba) Mike McEwen	2	2	20	15
(Ontario) Greg Balsdon	2	2	21	21
(British Columbia) John Morris	1	3	12	21

Pool B	W	L	PF	PA
(Manitoba) Jason Gunnlaugson	4	0	32	23
(Alberta) Kevin Koe	3	1	25	19
(Ontario) Brad Jacobs	2	2	23	16
(Manitoba) William Lyburn	1	3	21	28
(Scotland) Greg Drummond	0	4	19	34

Pool C	W	L	PF	PA
(South Korea) Kim Chang-min	3	1	25	9
(Manitoba) Reid Carruthers	3	1	24	23
(Manitoba) Pat Simmons	2	2	20	23
(Ontario) John Epping	2	2	19	21
(China) Liu Rui	0	4	14	27

=== Round-robin results ===
All draw times are listed in Eastern Time (UTC−05:00).

==== Draw 1 ====
Tuesday, November 14, 4:30 pm

Sheet B	1	2	3	4	5	6	7	8	Final
(Manitoba) Reid Carruthers	0	0	1	0	0	2	0	X	3
(South Korea) Kim Chang-min 🔨	3	1	0	1	1	0	1	X	7

==== Draw 2 ====
Tuesday, November 14, 8:00 pm

Sheet A	1	2	3	4	5	6	7	8	Final
(Manitoba) Jason Gunnlaugson 🔨	0	0	0	0	2	2	0	2	6
(Ontario) Brad Jacobs	0	0	0	2	0	0	1	0	3

Sheet B	1	2	3	4	5	6	7	8	Final
(Ontario) John Epping	1	0	1	0	0	0	2	1	5
(China) Liu Rui 🔨	0	1	0	0	1	1	0	0	3

Sheet C	1	2	3	4	5	6	7	8	9	Final
(Newfoundland and Labrador) Brad Gushue 🔨	2	1	0	1	0	1	1	0	1	7
(Manitoba) Mike McEwen	0	0	1	0	3	0	0	2	0	6

Sheet D	1	2	3	4	5	6	7	8	Final
(Alberta) Kevin Koe 🔨	0	2	0	2	0	2	1	X	7
(Scotland) Greg Drummond	1	0	1	0	1	0	0	X	3

==== Draw 3 ====
Wednesday, November 15, 8:30 am

Sheet C	1	2	3	4	5	6	7	8	Final
(Scotland) Bruce Mouat 🔨	1	1	0	4	0	2	0	X	8
(Ontario) Greg Balsdon	0	0	1	0	2	0	1	X	4

Sheet E	1	2	3	4	5	6	7	8	Final
(Manitoba) Pat Simmons	0	0	0	0	1	0	X	X	1
(South Korea) Kim Chang-min 🔨	2	1	3	1	0	1	X	X	8

==== Draw 4 ====
Wednesday, November 15, 12:00 pm

Sheet C	1	2	3	4	5	6	7	8	9	Final
(Manitoba) William Lyburn 🔨	0	2	0	1	0	0	3	1	0	7
(Manitoba) Jason Gunnlaugson	2	0	3	0	0	2	0	0	1	8

Sheet D	1	2	3	4	5	6	7	8	Final
(British Columbia) John Morris	0	0	1	0	0	X	X	X	1
(Manitoba) Mike McEwen 🔨	0	2	0	2	1	X	X	X	5

Sheet E	1	2	3	4	5	6	7	8	9	Final
(Manitoba) Reid Carruthers	0	1	0	0	3	1	0	0	1	6
(China) Liu Rui 🔨	1	0	1	1	0	0	1	1	0	5

==== Draw 5 ====
Wednesday, November 15, 4:00 pm

Sheet A	1	2	3	4	5	6	7	8	Final
(Ontario) John Epping	0	0	2	0	0	1	1	0	4
(Manitoba) Pat Simmons 🔨	0	1	0	2	2	0	0	2	7

==== Draw 6 ====
Wednesday, November 15, 8:00 pm

Sheet A	1	2	3	4	5	6	7	8	Final
(British Columbia) John Morris	1	0	0	0	2	0	1	0	4
(Ontario) Greg Balsdon 🔨	0	1	1	1	0	1	0	2	6

Sheet B	1	2	3	4	5	6	7	8	Final
(Ontario) Brad Jacobs	3	0	3	0	3	X	X	X	9
(Scotland) Greg Drummond 🔨	0	1	0	1	0	X	X	X	2

Sheet D	1	2	3	4	5	6	7	8	9	Final
(Scotland) Bruce Mouat	0	1	0	2	1	1	0	1	0	6
(Newfoundland and Labrador) Brad Gushue 🔨	2	0	2	0	0	0	2	0	1	7

Sheet E	1	2	3	4	5	6	7	8	Final
(Alberta) Kevin Koe 🔨	0	3	0	0	2	1	0	X	6
(Manitoba) William Lyburn	0	0	1	1	0	0	2	X	4

==== Draw 8 ====
Thursday, November 16, 12:00 pm

Sheet A	1	2	3	4	5	6	7	8	Final
(China) Liu Rui 🔨	1	0	0	0	0	0	X	X	1
(South Korea) Kim Chang-min	0	2	2	1	1	3	X	X	9

Sheet B	1	2	3	4	5	6	7	8	Final
(Scotland) Bruce Mouat 🔨	5	0	2	0	1	X	X	X	8
(British Columbia) John Morris	0	1	0	1	0	X	X	X	2

Sheet C	1	2	3	4	5	6	7	8	Final
(Manitoba) Reid Carruthers 🔨	2	0	2	2	0	2	0	1	9
(Newfoundland and Labrador) Brad Gushue	0	1	0	0	3	0	2	0	6

Sheet D	1	2	3	4	5	6	7	8	9	Final
(Alberta) Kevin Koe	0	1	0	2	0	1	0	2	0	6
(Manitoba) Jason Gunnlaugson 🔨	1	0	2	0	1	0	2	0	2	8

==== Draw 10 ====
Thursday, November 16, 8:00 pm

Sheet A	1	2	3	4	5	6	7	8	Final
(Scotland) Bruce Mouat 🔨	0	1	1	0	0	0	X	X	2
(Manitoba) Mike McEwen	1	0	0	3	1	2	X	X	7

Sheet B	1	2	3	4	5	6	7	8	Final
(Newfoundland and Labrador) Brad Gushue 🔨	1	0	3	0	1	0	2	0	7
(Ontario) Greg Balsdon	0	3	0	1	0	1	0	1	6

Sheet C	1	2	3	4	5	6	7	8	Final
(Ontario) Brad Jacobs	0	2	0	1	0	1	0	0	4
(Alberta) Kevin Koe 🔨	1	0	1	0	1	0	2	1	6

Sheet D	1	2	3	4	5	6	7	8	9	Final
(China) Liu Rui	0	0	0	0	2	1	2	0	0	5
(Manitoba) Pat Simmons 🔨	0	3	0	1	0	0	0	1	2	7

Sheet E	1	2	3	4	5	6	7	8	Final
(Manitoba) William Lyburn 🔨	2	0	2	0	0	1	0	3	8
(Scotland) Greg Drummond	0	1	0	2	1	0	3	0	7

==== Draw 12 ====
Friday, November 17, 12:00 pm

Sheet D	1	2	3	4	5	6	7	8	Final
(Ontario) John Epping 🔨	0	0	1	0	0	2	1	X	4
(South Korea) Kim Chang-min	0	0	0	0	1	0	0	X	1

==== Draw 13 ====
Friday, November 17, 4:00 pm

Sheet A	1	2	3	4	5	6	7	8	Final
(Ontario) Brad Jacobs	1	1	0	3	1	0	1	X	7
(Manitoba) William Lyburn 🔨	0	0	0	0	0	2	0	X	2

Sheet B	1	2	3	4	5	6	7	8	Final
(Manitoba) Reid Carruthers 🔨	2	0	2	0	1	1	0	0	6
(Manitoba) Pat Simmons	0	1	0	1	0	0	2	1	5

Sheet C	1	2	3	4	5	6	7	8	Final
(Newfoundland and Labrador) Brad Gushue	0	0	0	1	0	1	0	X	2
(British Columbia) John Morris 🔨	1	1	0	0	2	0	1	X	5

Sheet D	1	2	3	4	5	6	7	8	Final
(Ontario) Greg Balsdon 🔨	0	1	0	1	2	0	1	X	5
(Manitoba) Mike McEwen	1	0	0	0	0	1	0	X	2

Sheet E	1	2	3	4	5	6	7	8	9	Final
(Manitoba) Jason Gunnlaugson 🔨	0	2	0	3	0	0	2	0	3	10
(Scotland) Greg Drummond	0	0	2	0	0	2	0	3	0	7

=== Tiebreakers ===
Friday, November 17, 8:00 pm

Team	1	2	3	4	5	6	7	8	Final
(Scotland) Bruce Mouat 🔨	3	0	1	0	3	0	1	X	8
(Ontario) Brad Jacobs	0	2	0	1	0	2	0	X	5

Player percentages
(Scotland) Team Mouat		(Ontario) Team Jacobs	
Hammy McMillan Jr.	78%	Ryan Harnden	82%
Bobby Lammie	82%	E. J. Harnden	81%
Grant Hardie	92%	Ryan Fry	79%
Bruce Mouat	81%	Brad Jacobs	66%
Total	83%	Total	77%

Team	1	2	3	4	5	6	7	8	Final
(Manitoba) Pat Simmons 🔨	1	0	2	0	0	1	1	0	5
(Ontario) John Epping	0	2	0	2	1	0	0	2	7

Player percentages
(Manitoba) Team Simmons		(Ontario) Team Epping	
Rob Gordon	89%	Tim March	90%
Kyle Doering	87%	Pat Janssen	95%
Colton Lott	70%	Mat Camm	78%
Pat Simmons	69%	John Epping	87%
Total	79%	Total	87%

Team	1	2	3	4	5	6	7	8	Final
(Manitoba) Mike McEwen 🔨	0	2	1	1	0	5	X	X	9
(Ontario) Greg Balsdon	0	0	0	0	2	0	X	X	2

Player percentages
(Manitoba) Team McEwen		(Ontario) Team Balsdon	
Denni Neufeld	90%	Scott Chadwick	89%
Matt Wozniak	94%	Jonathan Beuk	66%
B. J. Neufeld	92%	Don Bowser	75%
Mike McEwen	87%	Greg Balsdon	69%
Total	91%	Total	75%

=== Playoffs ===
Quarterfinals
1	(Manitoba) Jason Gunnlaugson	3
8	(Ontario) John Epping	5
4	(South Korea) Kim Chang-min	7
5	(Manitoba) Reid Carruthers	3
2	(Newfoundland and Labrador) Brad Gushue	3
7	(Manitoba) Mike McEwen	5
3	(Alberta) Kevin Koe	2
6	(Scotland) Bruce Mouat	6

Semifinals
8	(Ontario) John Epping	7
4	(South Korea) Kim Chang-min	9
7	(Manitoba) Mike McEwen	4
6	(Scotland) Bruce Mouat	7

Final
4	(South Korea) Kim Chang-min	4
6	(Scotland) Bruce Mouat	9

==== Quarterfinals ====
Saturday, November 18, 5:00 pm

Team	1	2	3	4	5	6	7	8	Final
(Manitoba) Jason Gunnlaugson 🔨	0	2	0	0	0	1	0	0	3
(Ontario) John Epping	0	0	1	1	2	0	1	2	7

Player percentages
(Manitoba) Team Gunnlaugson		(Ontario) Team Epping	
Connor Njegovan	91%	Tim March	93%
Ian McMillan	85%	Pat Janssen	93%
Alex Forrest	73%	Mat Camm	87%
Jason Gunnlaugson	69%	John Epping	81%
Total	79%	Total	89%

Team	1	2	3	4	5	6	7	8	Final
(South Korea) Kim Chang-min 🔨	1	0	0	1	1	0	3	X	6
(Manitoba) Reid Carruthers	0	0	1	0	0	1	0	X	2

Player percentages
(South Korea) Team Kim		(Manitoba) Team Carruthers	
Lee Ki-bok	85%	Colin Hodgson	87%
Oh Eun-su	75%	Derek Samagalski	75%
Seong Se-hyeon	81%	Braeden Moskowy	68%
Kim Chang-min	86%	Reid Carruthers	73%
Total	82%	Total	76%

Team	1	2	3	4	5	6	7	8	Final
(Newfoundland and Labrador) Brad Gushue 🔨	1	0	0	0	1	0	1	0	3
(Manitoba) Mike McEwen	0	0	0	1	0	2	0	1	4

Player percentages
(Newfoundland and Labrador) Team Gushue		(Manitoba) Team McEwen	
Geoff Walker	72%	Denni Neufeld	85%
Brett Gallant	77%	Matt Wozniak	81%
Mark Nichols	74%	B. J. Neufeld	85%
Brad Gushue	69%	Mike McEwen	85%
Total	73%	Total	84%

Team	1	2	3	4	5	6	7	8	Final
(Alberta) Kevin Koe 🔨	0	0	1	0	0	0	X	X	1
(Scotland) Bruce Mouat	1	1	0	3	1	1	X	X	7

Player percentages
(Alberta) Team Koe		(Scotland) Team Mouat	
Ben Hebert	89%	Hammy McMillan Jr.	89%
Brent Laing	85%	Bobby Lammie	95%
Marc Kennedy	92%	Grant Hardie	79%
Kevin Koe	42%	Bruce Mouat	81%
Total	77%	Total	86%

==== Semifinals ====
Saturday, November 18, 9:00 pm

Sheet B	1	2	3	4	5	6	7	8	Final
(Manitoba) Mike McEwen	0	2	0	0	0	1	1	X	4
(Scotland) Bruce Mouat 🔨	2	0	0	3	1	0	0	X	6

Player percentages
(Manitoba) Team McEwen		(Scotland) Team Mouat	
Denni Neufeld	82%	Hammy McMillan Jr.	68%
Matt Wozniak	76%	Bobby Lammie	76%
B. J. Neufeld	78%	Grant Hardie	90%
Mike McEwen	76%	Bruce Mouat	85%
Total	78%	Total	79%

Sheet C	1	2	3	4	5	6	7	8	9	Final
(Ontario) John Epping	0	1	0	0	3	0	3	0	0	7
(South Korea) Kim Chang-min 🔨	0	0	0	2	0	2	0	3	1	8

Player percentages
(Ontario) Team Epping		(South Korea) Team Kim	
Tim March	77%	Lee Ki-bok	89%
Pat Janssen	83%	Oh Eun-su	81%
Mat Camm	85%	Seong Se-hyeon	83%
John Epping	69%	Kim Chang-min	66%
Total	79%	Total	80%

==== Final ====
Sunday, November 19, 12:00 pm

Sheet C	1	2	3	4	5	6	7	8	Final
(South Korea) Kim Chang-min 🔨	0	2	1	0	0	1	0	X	4
(Scotland) Bruce Mouat	1	0	0	3	1	0	4	X	9

Player percentages
(South Korea) Team Kim		(Scotland) Team Mouat	
Lee Ki-bok	93%	Hammy McMillan Jr.	85%
Oh Eun-su	74%	Bobby Lammie	87%
Seong Se-hyeon	83%	Grant Hardie	82%
Kim Chang-min	57%	Bruce Mouat	71%
Total	77%	Total	81%

== Women ==
=== Teams ===
Skip	Third	Second	Lead	Locale	OOM rank
Chelsea Carey	Cathy Overton-Clapham	Jocelyn Peterman	Laine Peters	Calgary, Alberta	14
Kerri Einarson	Selena Kaatz	Liz Fyfe	Kristin MacCuish	Winnipeg, Manitoba	9
Michelle Englot	Kate Cameron	Leslie Wilson-Westcott	Raunora Westcott	Winnipeg, Manitoba	10
Binia Feltscher	Irene Schori	Franziska Kaufmann	Carole Howald	Flims, Switzerland	23
Allison Flaxey	Clancy Grandy	Lynn Kreviazuk	Morgan Court	Caledon, Ontario	8
Tracy Fleury	Crystal Webster	Jennifer Wylie	Amanda Gates	Sudbury, Ontario	21
Jacqueline Harrison	Janet Murphy	Jestyn Murphy (Note: Murphy replaced Stephanie Matheson.)	Melissa Foster	Mississauga, Ontario	15
Rachel Homan	Emma Miskew	Joanne Courtney	Lisa Weagle	Ottawa, Ontario	3
Jennifer Jones	Kaitlyn Lawes	Jill Officer	Dawn McEwen	Winnipeg, Manitoba	2
Alina Pätz	Nadine Lehmann	Marisa Winkelhausen	Nicole Schwägli	Zürich, Switzerland	7
Kelsey Rocque	Laura Crocker	Taylor McDonald	Jen Gates	Edmonton, Alberta	12
Casey Scheidegger	Cary-Anne McTaggart	Jessie Scheidegger	Kristie Moore	Lethbridge, Alberta	11
Val Sweeting	Lori Olson-Johns	Dana Ferguson	Rachelle Brown	Edmonton, Alberta	6
Julie Tippin	Chantal Duhaime	Rachelle Vink	Tess Bobbie	Woodstock, Ontario	19
Wang Bingyu	Zhou Yan	Liu Jinli	Ma Jingyi	Harbin, China	18

=== Round-robin standings ===
Final round-robin standings

Key
Teams to Playoffs

Pool A	W	L	PF	PA
(Ontario) Tracy Fleury	4	0	27	18
(Ontario) Rachel Homan	3	1	26	15
(Manitoba) Michelle Englot	1	3	21	26
(Ontario) Jacqueline Harrison	1	3	22	26
(Manitoba) Kerri Einarson	1	3	19	30

Pool B	W	L	PF	PA
(Manitoba) Jennifer Jones	4	0	28	10
(Alberta) Casey Scheidegger	3	1	25	20
(Switzerland) Alina Pätz	2	2	18	25
(Ontario) Julie Tippin	1	3	13	17
(Alberta) Kelsey Rocque	0	4	17	27

Pool C	W	L	PF	PA
(Alberta) Val Sweeting	4	0	28	11
(Alberta) Chelsea Carey	2	2	22	22
(Switzerland) Binia Feltscher	2	2	19	23
(China) Wang Bingyu	1	3	17	23
(Ontario) Allison Flaxey	1	3	16	23

=== Round-robin results ===
All draw times are listed in Eastern Time (UTC−05:00).

==== Draw 1 ====
Tuesday, November 14, 4:30 pm

Sheet C	1	2	3	4	5	6	7	8	Final
(Alberta) Val Sweeting 🔨	3	0	0	2	0	1	0	3	9
(Switzerland) Binia Feltscher	0	1	1	0	1	0	2	0	5

Sheet D	1	2	3	4	5	6	7	8	Final
(Manitoba) Jennifer Jones 🔨	3	2	1	1	X	X	X	X	7
(Switzerland) Alina Pätz	0	0	0	0	X	X	X	X	0

Sheet E	1	2	3	4	5	6	7	8	Final
(Ontario) Allison Flaxey	0	0	1	0	0	0	1	1	3
(China) Wang Bingyu 🔨	0	2	0	2	1	1	0	0	6

==== Draw 2 ====
Tuesday, November 14, 8:00 pm

Sheet E	1	2	3	4	5	6	7	8	9	Final
(Ontario) Rachel Homan	0	1	0	0	1	0	1	1	0	4
(Ontario) Tracy Fleury 🔨	1	0	1	1	0	1	0	0	1	5

==== Draw 3 ====
Wednesday, November 15, 8:30 am

Sheet A	1	2	3	4	5	6	7	8	Final
(Ontario) Julie Tippin 🔨	2	1	0	0	2	0	1	0	6
(Alberta) Kelsey Rocque	0	0	1	1	0	1	0	1	4

Sheet B	1	2	3	4	5	6	7	8	Final
(Ontario) Jacqueline Harrison	0	1	2	0	1	0	0	3	7
(Manitoba) Michelle Englot 🔨	1	0	0	1	0	2	0	0	4

Sheet D	1	2	3	4	5	6	7	8	Final
(Alberta) Chelsea Carey	0	0	2	0	1	0	1	0	4
(Switzerland) Binia Feltscher 🔨	1	1	0	2	0	0	0	2	6

==== Draw 4 ====
Wednesday, November 15, 12:00 pm

Sheet A	1	2	3	4	5	6	7	8	Final
(Switzerland) Alina Pätz 🔨	0	0	1	0	1	0	X	X	2
(Alberta) Casey Scheidegger	3	1	0	2	0	1	X	X	7

Sheet B	1	2	3	4	5	6	7	8	Final
(Ontario) Tracy Fleury	0	2	0	2	0	2	1	1	8
(Manitoba) Kerri Einarson 🔨	2	0	1	0	2	0	0	0	5

==== Draw 5 ====
Wednesday, November 15, 4:00 pm

Sheet B	1	2	3	4	5	6	7	8	Final
(China) Wang Bingyu 🔨	0	1	0	0	0	2	0	X	3
(Alberta) Chelsea Carey	2	0	2	1	1	0	1	X	7

Sheet C	1	2	3	4	5	6	7	8	Final
(Ontario) Rachel Homan 🔨	2	0	2	0	0	2	1	1	8
(Ontario) Jacqueline Harrison	0	2	0	1	1	0	0	0	4

Sheet D	1	2	3	4	5	6	7	8	Final
(Ontario) Allison Flaxey 🔨	0	0	1	0	0	0	1	0	2
(Alberta) Val Sweeting	0	1	0	0	1	0	0	1	3

Sheet E	1	2	3	4	5	6	7	8	Final
(Manitoba) Jennifer Jones 🔨	1	0	0	2	0	0	0	4	7
(Alberta) Kelsey Rocque	0	1	1	0	0	0	1	0	3

==== Draw 6 ====
Wednesday, November 15, 8:00 pm

Sheet C	1	2	3	4	5	6	7	8	Final
(Manitoba) Kerri Einarson	0	1	2	0	2	0	0	1	6
(Manitoba) Michelle Englot 🔨	1	0	0	2	0	3	2	0	8

==== Draw 7 ====
Thursday, November 16, 8:30 am

Sheet A	1	2	3	4	5	6	7	8	Final
(Switzerland) Binia Feltscher 🔨	1	0	0	1	0	0	1	X	3
(Ontario) Allison Flaxey	0	2	1	0	0	3	0	X	6

Sheet B	1	2	3	4	5	6	7	8	Final
(Switzerland) Alina Pätz 🔨	1	0	2	0	2	0	2	X	7
(Alberta) Kelsey Rocque	0	2	0	1	0	1	0	X	4

Sheet C	1	2	3	4	5	6	7	8	Final
(Ontario) Julie Tippin	0	0	0	3	1	0	0	X	4
(Alberta) Casey Scheidegger 🔨	0	2	1	0	0	3	1	X	7

Sheet D	1	2	3	4	5	6	7	8	Final
(Ontario) Jacqueline Harrison	0	0	2	0	2	0	1	X	5
(Ontario) Tracy Fleury 🔨	2	0	0	3	0	2	0	X	7

Sheet E	1	2	3	4	5	6	7	8	Final
(Alberta) Val Sweeting	0	0	1	3	0	1	1	2	8
(China) Wang Bingyu 🔨	2	1	0	0	1	0	0	0	4

==== Draw 9 ====
Thursday, November 16, 4:00 pm

Sheet A	1	2	3	4	5	6	7	8	Final
(Ontario) Tracy Fleury 🔨	1	1	0	3	0	2	0	X	7
(Manitoba) Michelle Englot	0	0	2	0	1	0	1	X	4

Sheet B	1	2	3	4	5	6	7	8	Final
(Ontario) Rachel Homan 🔨	2	1	1	0	1	3	X	X	8
(Manitoba) Kerri Einarson	0	0	0	1	0	0	X	X	1

Sheet C	1	2	3	4	5	6	7	8	Final
(Alberta) Val Sweeting 🔨	2	0	1	1	3	1	X	X	8
(Alberta) Chelsea Carey	0	0	0	0	0	0	X	X	0

Sheet D	1	2	3	4	5	6	7	8	Final
(Manitoba) Jennifer Jones	0	0	1	0	1	0	2	2	6
(Ontario) Julie Tippin 🔨	1	0	0	1	0	1	0	0	3

Sheet E	1	2	3	4	5	6	7	8	Final
(Alberta) Kelsey Rocque 🔨	2	0	2	0	0	2	0	0	6
(Alberta) Casey Scheidegger	0	2	0	1	0	0	3	1	7

==== Draw 11 ====
Friday, November 17, 8:30 am

Sheet B	1	2	3	4	5	6	7	8	Final
(Switzerland) Binia Feltscher	0	0	1	0	1	0	2	1	5
(China) Wang Bingyu 🔨	0	1	0	2	0	1	0	0	4

Sheet C	1	2	3	4	5	6	7	8	Final
(Ontario) Jacqueline Harrison 🔨	0	1	0	2	0	2	1	0	6
(Manitoba) Kerri Einarson	0	0	3	0	1	0	0	3	7

==== Draw 12 ====
Friday, November 17, 12:00 pm

Sheet A	1	2	3	4	5	6	7	8	9	Final
(Switzerland) Alina Pätz	0	0	2	0	2	0	3	0	2	9
(Ontario) Julie Tippin 🔨	2	0	0	1	0	1	0	3	0	7

Sheet B	1	2	3	4	5	6	7	8	Final
(Manitoba) Jennifer Jones 🔨	2	1	0	1	0	0	4	X	8
(Alberta) Casey Scheidegger	0	0	1	0	0	3	0	X	4

Sheet C	1	2	3	4	5	6	7	8	Final
(Ontario) Rachel Homan 🔨	0	2	0	2	0	1	0	1	6
(Manitoba) Michelle Englot	0	0	1	0	2	0	2	0	5

Sheet E	1	2	3	4	5	6	7	8	Final
(Alberta) Chelsea Carey 🔨	2	2	0	2	1	0	4	X	11
(Ontario) Allison Flaxey	0	0	2	0	0	3	0	X	5

=== Playoffs ===
Quarterfinals
1	(Ontario) Tracy Fleury	9
8	(Switzerland) Binia Feltscher	3
4	(Alberta) Casey Scheidegger	8
5	(Ontario) Rachel Homan	4
2	(Manitoba) Jennifer Jones	7
7	(Switzerland) Alina Pätz	4
3	(Alberta) Val Sweeting	3
6	(Alberta) Chelsea Carey	6

Semifinals
1	(Ontario) Tracy Fleury	4
4	(Alberta) Casey Scheidegger	7
2	(Manitoba) Jennifer Jones	6
6	(Alberta) Chelsea Carey	5

Final
4	(Alberta) Casey Scheidegger	7
2	(Manitoba) Jennifer Jones	8

==== Quarterfinals ====
Saturday, November 18, 1:00 pm

Sheet A	1	2	3	4	5	6	7	8	Final
(Ontario) Tracy Fleury 🔨	1	0	1	3	4	0	X	X	9
(Switzerland) Binia Feltscher	0	2	0	0	0	1	X	X	3

Player percentages
(Ontario) Team Fleury		(Switzerland) Team Feltscher	
Amanda Gates	73%	Carole Howald	69%
Jennifer Wylie	68%	Franziska Kaufmann	50%
Crystal Webster	53%	Irene Schori	60%
Tracy Fleury	80%	Binia Feltscher	50%
Total	68%	Total	58%

Sheet B	1	2	3	4	5	6	7	8	Final
(Ontario) Rachel Homan	0	1	0	2	0	1	0	X	4
(Alberta) Casey Scheidegger 🔨	1	0	2	0	3	0	1	X	7

Player percentages
(Ontario) Team Homan		(Alberta) Team Scheidegger	
Lisa Weagle	82%	Kristie Moore	82%
Joanne Courtney	77%	Jessie Scheidegger	86%
Emma Miskew	89%	Cary-Anne McTaggart	80%
Rachel Homan	71%	Casey Scheidegger	74%
Total	80%	Total	80%

Sheet C	1	2	3	4	5	6	7	8	Final
(Manitoba) Jennifer Jones 🔨	1	0	2	0	1	0	3	X	7
(Switzerland) Alina Pätz	0	1	0	1	0	2	0	X	4

Player percentages
(Manitoba) Team Jones		(Switzerland) Team Pätz	
Dawn McEwen	88%	Nicole Schwägli	90%
Jill Officer	89%	Marisa Winkelhausen	73%
Kaitlyn Lawes	76%	Nadine Lehmann	74%
Jennifer Jones	88%	Alina Pätz	84%
Total	85%	Total	80%

Sheet D	1	2	3	4	5	6	7	8	Final
(Alberta) Val Sweeting 🔨	1	0	0	1	0	1	0	X	3
(Alberta) Chelsea Carey	0	0	2	0	2	0	1	X	5

Player percentages
(Alberta) Team Sweeting		(Alberta) Team Carey	
Rachelle Brown	75%	Laine Peters	77%
Dana Ferguson	78%	Jocelyn Peterman	92%
Lori Olson-Johns	85%	Cathy Overton-Clapham	79%
Val Sweeting	75%	Chelsea Carey	85%
Total	78%	Total	84%

==== Semifinals ====
Saturday, November 18, 9:00 pm

Sheet A	1	2	3	4	5	6	7	8	Final
(Manitoba) Jennifer Jones 🔨	1	0	1	0	0	3	0	1	6
(Alberta) Chelsea Carey	0	1	0	1	2	0	1	0	5

Player percentages
(Manitoba) Team Jones		(Alberta) Team Carey	
Dawn McEwen	89%	Laine Peters	79%
Jill Officer	66%	Jocelyn Peterman	66%
Kaitlyn Lawes	66%	Cathy Overton-Clapham	82%
Jennifer Jones	59%	Chelsea Carey	68%
Total	70%	Total	74%

Sheet D	1	2	3	4	5	6	7	8	Final
(Ontario) Tracy Fleury 🔨	1	0	2	0	0	1	0	0	4
(Alberta) Casey Scheidegger	0	3	0	1	2	0	0	1	7

Player percentages
(Ontario) Team Fleury		(Alberta) Team Scheidegger	
Amanda Gates	68%	Kristie Moore	69%
Jennifer Wylie	69%	Jessie Scheidegger	83%
Crystal Webster	63%	Cary-Anne McTaggart	70%
Tracy Fleury	59%	Casey Scheidegger	85%
Total	65%	Total	77%

==== Final ====
Sunday, November 19, 4:00 pm

Sheet C	1	2	3	4	5	6	7	8	Final
(Alberta) Casey Scheidegger	0	2	0	2	0	0	2	1	7
(Manitoba) Jennifer Jones 🔨	3	0	2	0	2	1	0	0	8

Player percentages
(Alberta) Team Scheidegger		(Manitoba) Team Jones	
Kristie Moore	80%	Dawn McEwen	53%
Jessie Scheidegger	73%	Jill Officer	75%
Cary-Anne McTaggart	75%	Kaitlyn Lawes	76%
Casey Scheidegger	80%	Jennifer Jones	88%
Total	77%	Total	73%
