= Tracy Fleury =

Canadian curler (born 1986)

- Curler
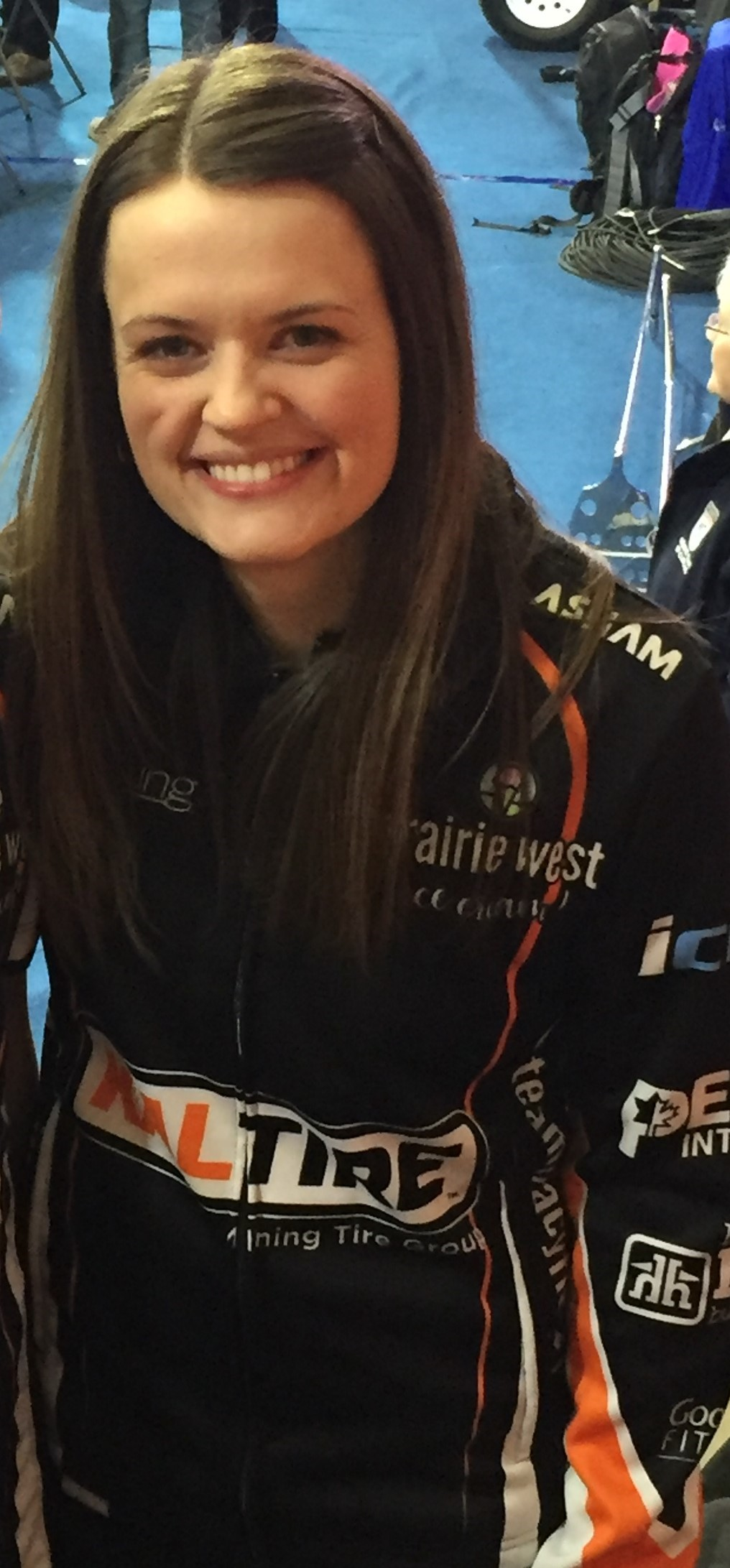
- Fleury at the 2018 Masters
- Born: Tracy Horgan; June 13, 1986 (age 40); Sudbury, Ontario, Canada

Team
- Skip: Rachel Homan
- Third: Tracy Fleury
- Second: Emma Miskew
- Lead: Sarah Wilkes
- Alternate: Rachelle Brown

Curling career
- Member Association: Northern Ontario (2001–2018); Manitoba (2018–2022); Ontario (2022–present)
- Hearts: 8 (2012, 2015, 2018, 2019, 2022, 2023, 2024, 2025)
- World Championship: 2 (2024, 2025)
- Pan Continental Championship: 2 (2024, 2025)
- Olympic: 1 (2026)
- Top CTRS ranking: 1st (2021–22, 2023–24, 2024–25, 2025–26)
- Grand Slam victories: 11 (2019 Masters, 2021 Masters, 2022 Tour Challenge, 2023 Champions Cup, 2023 Masters, 2024 Canadian Open (Jan.), 2024 Canadian Open (Nov.), 2024 National, 2025 Masters (Sept.), 2025 Tour Challenge, 2025 GSOC Tahoe)
Medal record
Women's curling
Representing Canada
Olympic Games
Bronze medal – third place	2026 Milano Cortina	Team
World Curling Championships
Gold medal – first place	2024 Sydney
Gold medal – first place	2025 Uijeongbu
Pan Continental Curling Championships
Gold medal – first place	2024 Lacombe
Silver medal – second place	2025 Virginia
Scotties Tournament of Hearts
Gold medal – first place	2025 Thunder Bay
Representing Ontario
Canadian Olympic Curling Trials
Gold medal – first place	2025 Halifax
Scotties Tournament of Hearts
Gold medal – first place	2024 Calgary
Representing Manitoba
Canadian Olympic Curling Trials
Silver medal – second place	2021 Saskatoon

Tracy Fleury (born Tracy Horgan; June 13, 1986) is a Canadian curler from Sudbury, Ontario. She joined the Rachel Homan rink as skip for the 2022–23 season, and now plays third on the team. With Homan, she won the 2024 Scotties Tournament of Hearts and later the 2024 World Women's Curling Championship representing Team Canada. The following season, the team defended their titles at the 2025 Scotties Tournament of Hearts and the 2025 World Women's Curling Championship. The team also won the bronze medal in 2026 Winter Olympics. In 2021, she led her team to a silver medal at the 2021 Canadian Olympic Curling Trials. She has competed at the Canadian national championship eight times and was the Northern Ontario women's junior champion skip from 2005 to 2007.

Fleury represented Northern Ontario at three Canadian Junior Curling Championships during her junior career (2005, 2006 and 2007). She aged out of juniors in 2008 and began skipping her own rink on the Ontario and World Curling Tour's. Throughout her women's career, she has won six Northern Ontario provincial championships (2008, 2010, 2012, 2014, 2015, 2018) and went on to win the Ontario Scotties Tournament of Hearts in 2012. Curling out of Ontario, she won the 2023 Ontario Scotties Tournament of Hearts. She also won the 2019 Manitoba Scotties Tournament of Hearts skipping a new team. She has competed at the Scotties Tournament of Hearts, Canada's national women's curling championship eight times (2012, 2015, 2018, 2019, 2022, 2023, 2024, 2025), winning the event in 2024 and 2025 and reaching the playoffs in 2018 and 2022. She also won the silver medal at the 2021 Canadian Olympic Curling Trials and is an eleven time Grand Slam champion.

== Career ==
=== Juniors ===
Fleury was born in Sudbury, Ontario. She attended Lockerby Composite School. She won three Northern Ontario Bantam titles and competed in the 2002 Ontario Curling Trials for the 2003 Canada Winter Games. She also won three consecutive Northern Ontario junior provincial championships in 2005, 2006 and 2007.

In 2005, Fleury actually did not skip the Northern Ontario team, but threw fourth stones. Instead, her sister Jennifer Wylie who was second on the team held the broom. At the 2005 Canadian Junior Curling Championships, Fleury finished with a 7–5 record, just out of the playoffs. The next year at the 2006 championship, with Fleury at skip, they finished with a 7–4 record, tied for third place with Nova Scotia (skipped by Sarah Rhyno). This would mean they had to play in a tie-breaker match, which Nova Scotia would win. At her final trip to the juniors in 2007, Fleury once again won seven games, and lost five, however, this would not be enough to make the playoffs.

Also during her junior career, Fleury competed in two University Curling Championships, skipping the Laurentian University Lady Vees. They placed fourth in 2007, and third in 2008.

=== 2008–2013 ===
In 2008, Fleury's team graduated to the women's level, and the team qualified for the 2008 Ontario Scotties Tournament of Hearts after winning the inaugural Northern Ontario women's championship. The team finished with a 3–6 record. The next season they also qualified for the 2009 Ontario Scotties Tournament of Hearts, having lost to Krista McCarville in the Northern Ontario final, which was good enough to qualify. The team finished with a 4–5 record.

Fleury won her second Northern Ontario championship in December 2009, earning her team the right to play in the 2010 Ontario Scotties Tournament of Hearts. There, her rink went all the way to the provincial final before losing to McCarville. Also during the 2009–10 season, Fleury won the Northern Ontario Mixed Championship with Jordan Chandler, Clint Cudmore and Lindsay Miners. They represented Northern Ontario at the 2010 Canadian Mixed Curling Championship, where they finished in eleventh place with an 3–8 record.

Fleury's rink had two runner-up finishes on the World Curling Tour during the 2010–11 season, at the Royal LePage Women's Fall Classic and the AMJ Campbell Shorty Jenkins Classic. They were able to return to the 2011 Ontario Scotties Tournament of Hearts by winning the fourth and final slot at the Northern Ontario championship. They once again had a good showing at the provincial tournament by qualifying for the playoffs, but were once again bested by the McCarville rink, this time in the semifinal.

Team Fleury (then known as Team Horgan) had another slow start in their 2012 campaign, placing third at the Northern Ontario championship. However, they would have another successful tournament at that year's 2012 Ontario Scotties Tournament of Hearts. The team lost just two round robin games, and would eventually upset the previously undefeated Rachel Homan rink in the final. Homan missed a draw to the button to win the game on her last rock. At the 2012 Scotties Tournament of Hearts Fleury and team would find difficulties throughout the week, finishing round robin with a 4–7 record. Also during the 2011–12 season, her team played in their first Grand Slam of Curling event, the 2011 Curlers Corner Autumn Gold Curling Classic. There, they defeated higher seeds Liudmila Privivkova and Jennifer Jones in their first two games before losing three of their last four matches, ultimately being eliminated.

Fleury's rink began the 2012–13 season well by winning the 2012 AMJ Campbell Shorty Jenkins Classic. They also played in four Grand Slam events, qualifying for the playoffs in one of them, the 2012 Masters. However, their bid to return to the Scotties at the provincial 2013 Ontario Scotties Tournament of Hearts was unsuccessful, with the team finishing with a 4–5 record, missing the playoffs. Later that year at the 2013 Pomeroy Inn & Suites Prairie Showdown, the team went all the way to the finals before losing in an extra end to Mirjam Ott, the World Champion at the time.

=== 2013–2018 ===
The Fleury rink secured a spot at the 2013 Road to the Roar, the Olympic pre-trials event. At the Road to the Roar, the team went 4–3 and lost the 'C' event final on last rock to Val Sweeting, who qualified for the Roar along with Renée Sonnenberg. Fleury defeated the top two seeds at the event, Shannon Kleibrink and Laura Crocker. Following the Pre-Trials, the team went undefeated at the Northern Ontario Scotties playdowns. By finishing first at the playdowns, the team competed at the 2014 Ontario Scotties Tournament of Hearts in Sault Ste. Marie, Ontario. The team had a disappointing run at the provincials that year, giving up key steals in their losses to finish with a 5–4 record and ultimately missing the playoffs for a second consecutive year.

The team was selected to represent Canada at the third annual Yichun International Ladies Cup in Yichun, China from December 28, 2013 – January 1, 2014. The team went 6–1 in the round robin with their only loss coming from Silvana Tirinzoni of Switzerland in the opening draw. The team defeated Wang Bingyu in the semifinal and Jiang Yilun in the final to win the event.

Team Fleury had a successful start to their 2014–15 season, finishing third at the Stroud Sleeman Cash Spiel and qualifying for the playoffs of a Grand Slam event, the 2014 Curlers Corner Autumn Gold Curling Classic for a second time in their career making it to the quarterfinal before losing to former provincial rival Rachel Homan of Ottawa. At the 2014 DEKALB Superspiel in Morris, Manitoba, the team lost their opening match to Colleen Kilgallen before winning their next eight games. They defeated St. Vital's Jennifer Jones in the final and earned 22.5 CTRS Points for their win. Just three weeks later, at the Curl Mesabi Classic, the Fleury rink finished first in their pool after the round-robin with a 3–1 record. In the playoffs, they defeated Patti Lank in the semifinal and defeated Erika Brown in the final to claim the championship title. At the 2015 Northern Ontario Scotties Tournament of Hearts, the Fleury rink became the first women's team to represent Northern Ontario at the Scotties. The team finished the tournament with a perfect 5–0 record, defeating city rival Kendra Lilly 4–3 in a close match. Team Fleury then had to win a relegation qualifier prior to the 2015 Scotties Tournament of Hearts in order to compete in the main tournament.

During the relegation round at the 2015 Scotties Tournament of Hearts, Fleury defeated Kerry Galusha from the Northwest Territories 10–5 and then beat Sarah Koltun from the Yukon 7–5. In the pre-qualification final, they once again defeated the team from Yellowknife, 7–6, securing the right to represent Northern Ontario in the main draw at the Scotties for the first time. In the main event, they found some success defeating higher seeds such as Ontario's Julie Hastings and Saskatchewan's Stefanie Lawton. Headed into draw seventeen, the final draw before the playoff round, Northern Ontario and Rachel Homan, Team Canada at the time, shared 6–4 records. The winner of their game would determine the fourth seed for the playoffs, and the loser would be eliminated. After leading 4–2 after six ends, they would allow Homan to score two points in the seventh end to tie the game. After a blank in the eighth, Fleury was heavy on a tap attempt in the ninth end and gave up a steal of two points. Homan would run them out of stones in the tenth end to win 6–5. Therefore, Northern Ontario finished fifth at the 2015 event with a 6–5 record.

After the conclusion of the 2014–15 season, Team Fleury announced that they would add Calgary's Crystal Webster to the lineup in a five-player rotation due to work commitments from Fleury's front end. The team found success early, advancing all the way to the semifinal of the 2015 Tour Challenge Grand Slam. They finished the round robin with a 2–2 record with wins over Eve Muirhead and Kim Eun-jung, qualifying for a tiebreaker. The team stole the eighth end of the tiebreaker against Chelsea Carey and went on to defeat Sherry Middaugh in the quarterfinal. They were defeated by Switzerland's Silvana Tirinzoni 9–7 in the semifinal to end their run in the slam. It marked the first time Fleury advanced to the semifinal of a Slam. Although the team struggled at the next Slam, The Masters, finishing with a 1–3 record, they quickly rebounded and made it all the way to the final of The National. Up 4–3 without hammer in the eighth and final end, the team forced Rachel Homan to execute a difficult draw to the four-foot through a port to win, which was made. A month later, they played in the 2015 Canada Cup of Curling, where they went 1–5. In their next slam, the team lost in the quarterfinals of the 2015 Meridian Canadian Open. In playdowns, the team failed in their attempt to repeat as Northern Ontario champions, losing to Krista McCarville in the final. They wrapped up their season at the 2016 Players' Championship, where they finished with a 1–4 record. The team's success from the season left them in seventh spot on the Canadian Team Ranking System.

Team Fleury began the 2016–17 Grand Slam season at the 2016 WFG Masters, going 1–3 at the event. A month later, the team lost in the quarterfinals of the 2016 Tour Challenge. Later that month, they picked up a win at The Sunova Spiel at East St. Paul World Curling Tour event. A week later, they played in the 2016 Canada Cup of Curling, which they finished with a 2–4 record. At their next slam, the 2016 National, they missed the playoffs again with a 1–3 record. They were more successful at the 2017 Meridian Canadian Open, where they lost in the quarterfinal. At the 2017 Northern Ontario Scotties Tournament of Hearts, they again lost in the final to the Krista McCarville rink. The team finished their season with another quarterfinal finish at the 2017 Players' Championship.

Team Fleury began the 2017–18 season at the 2017 Tour Challenge, where they finished with a winless 0–4 record. The next month, they picked up a tour event win at the Gord Carroll Curling Classic. After three seasons as one of the top teams in Canada, Team Fleury qualified for the 2017 Canadian Olympic Curling Pre-Trials as the number one seed. At the Pre-trials, Fleury finished with a disappointing 2–4 record, missing the playoffs. A week later, the team rebounded by making it all the way to the semifinal of the 2017 National Grand Slam event. Team Fleury regrouped at the 2018 Northern Ontario Scotties Tournament of Hearts, defeating Krista McCarville in the final to qualify for the 2018 Scotties Tournament of Hearts. The team would finish round-robin and championship pool play with an 8–3 record, in fourth place and a spot in the playoffs. They would lose the 3 vs. 4 page playoff game to Mary-Anne Arsenault of Nova Scotia, eliminating them from the tournament. A few weeks later, the team announced they would disband at the end of the 2017–18 season, citing work and family commitments.

=== 2018–2022 ===
In 2018, Fleury announced she would be replacing Kerri Einarson on her Manitoba team, skipping the team of Selena Njegovan, Liz Fyfe and Kristin MacCuish for the 2019–2022 quadrennial out of East St. Paul, Manitoba. Fleury remained in Sudbury, and plays with the team as their designated out-of-province curler. The team had a nearly full schedule in Grand Slam events, beginning the season at the Elite 10, where they missed the playoffs after winning just one game. Next, they made it to the quarterfinals of the 2018 Masters, which they followed up by making it to the finals of the 2018 Tour Challenge, where they lost to Rachel Homan. Outside of the Grand Slam tour, they were invited to represent Canada at the second leg of the Curling World Cup, which they finished with a 4–2 record, narrowly missing the final. The following week they were back into a Grand Slam event, the 2018 National, where they won just one game. The following month, they played in the 2019 Canadian Open, again missing the playoffs. The team found success in provincial playdowns, winning the 2019 Manitoba Scotties Tournament of Hearts defeating Kerri Einarson 13–7 in the final to represent Manitoba at the 2019 Scotties Tournament of Hearts. A week after provincials, Fleury's played in at the 2019 TSN All-Star Curling Skins Game where they lost to Jennifer Jones in the final. The team did earn $32,500 during the tournament. At the Hearts, Fleury led her Manitoba team to a 4–3 record in pool play, but lost to British Columbia's Sarah Wark rink in a tiebreaker to get into the championship pool, which eliminated the team from contention. They finished the season off by making it to the quarterfinals of the 2019 Players' Championship.

To start the 2019–20 season, Fleury and her team finished fourth at the 2019 Hokkaido Bank Curling Classic. Later that month, they won the 2019 Cargill Curling Training Centre Icebreaker. Next they played in the 2019 AMJ Campbell Shorty Jenkins Classic where they once again had a successful weekend, losing in the final to Jennifer Jones. Two weeks later, they played in the 2019 Colonial Square Ladies Classic where they went undefeated until the final where they came up short to Homan. Team Fleury had two more playoff finishes at the 2019 Curlers Corner Autumn Gold Curling Classic and the 2019 Canad Inns Women's Classic, where they lost in the semifinals and quarterfinals respectively. Their next event was the first Grand Slam of the season, the 2019 Masters where they qualified for the playoffs with a 3–1 record. With wins over Elena Stern in the quarterfinals and Anna Hasselborg in the semifinal, Fleury made her third Grand Slam final. She would be successful this time, defeating Sayaka Yoshimura to claim her first Grand Slam title. The next week, they had a quarterfinal finish at the second Slam of the season, the 2019 Tour Challenge. At the Canada Cup, the Fleury team once again had a successful run, qualifying for the playoffs with a 5–1 record. They downed Chelsea Carey 9–4 in the semifinal before coming up short to Rachel Homan in the final. Team Fleury capped off the 2019 part of the season with a semifinal finish at the 2019 Boost National Grand Slam. This meant they qualified for the playoffs in all ten of the events they played in to start the season. To start 2020, the Fleury rink along with five other Canadian rinks, represented Canada at the 2020 Continental Cup. Team Canada did not have a good week however, losing to the Europeans by fifteen points. They missed the playoffs for the first time during the season when they were knocked out of the triple knockout format at the 2020 Canadian Open. At the 2020 Manitoba Scotties Tournament of Hearts, the provincial championship, Team Fleury lost the semifinal to Jennifer Jones. They did have another chance to qualify for the 2020 Scotties Tournament of Hearts through the Wild Card play in game which they also lost to Jones. It would be the team's last event of the season as both the Players' Championship and the Champions Cup Grand Slam events were cancelled due to the COVID-19 pandemic.

Team Fleury added longtime skip and 2013 Canadian Olympic Curling Trials silver medallist Sherry Middaugh to coach the team for the 2020–21 season. Due to the COVID-19 pandemic in Manitoba, the 2021 provincial championship was cancelled. As the reigning provincials champions Team Kerri Einarson were already qualified for the Scotties as Team Canada, Team Jennifer Jones was given the invitation to represent Manitoba at the 2021 Scotties Tournament of Hearts as they were the 2020 provincial runners-up. However, due to many provinces cancelling their provincial championships as a result of the COVID-19 pandemic in Canada, Curling Canada added three Wild Card teams to the national championship, which were based on the CTRS standings from the 2019–20 season. Because Team Fleury ranked 2nd on the CTRS and kept at least three of their four players together for the 2020–21 season, they got the first Wild Card spot at the 2021 Scotties in Calgary, Alberta. Fleury did not compete at the Hearts, as she wanted to stay home with her baby daughter, who was diagnosed with infantile spasms, a rare form of epilepsy. In her place was two-time Scotties champion Chelsea Carey who was left without a team for the season. At the Hearts, Carey led Fleury's rink to a 6–6 eighth-place finish. Fleury herself only competed in one event with her team during the season, the 2021 Champions Cup, held in the same Calgary bubble in April 2021. When she played in the event, it was the first time she had seen her teammates in over a year and the first time she had played a competitive game since the Wild Card game at the 2020 Scotties Tournament of Hearts. Despite this, Fleury led her team to a 4–0 round robin record before losing in the semifinal to Switzerland's Silvana Tirinzoni. She was again replaced by Carey at the final event of the year, the 2021 Players' Championship. There, Carey skipped Fleury's rink to a 2–3 round robin record, missing the playoffs.

Back fulltime for the 2021–22 season, Fleury and her team began the season at the 2021 Oakville Labour Day Classic. There, they went a perfect 7–0 to claim the title, defeating Suzanne Birt 8–7 in the final. Two weeks later, they won their second tour event of the season at the 2021 Sherwood Park Women's Curling Classic. After finishing 4–0 through the round robin, they defeated Cory Christensen, Kim Eun-jung, and Kerri Einarson in the quarterfinals, semifinals and final respectively to win their second title of the season. After a quarterfinal finish at the 2021 Curlers Corner Autumn Gold Curling Classic, the team played in the first slam event of the season, the 2021 Masters. In the triple knockout qualifying round, they finished 3–1 and qualified through the B Side. They then defeated Einarson 6–2 in the quarterfinals and topped Alina Kovaleva 8–4 in the semifinals to qualify for their second slam final as a team, where they faced Team Jennifer Jones. After Fleury took an early lead, Jones tied things up in eighth to force an extra end. In the extra, Fleury secured the win with a double takeout and defended her Masters title from 2019. At the second Grand Slam of the season, the 2021 National, the team posted undefeated record until they reached the final where they were defeated by Sweden's Anna Hasselborg 9–6 in an extra end.

Then came the 2021 Canadian Olympic Curling Trials, held November 20 to 28 in Saskatoon, Saskatchewan. After their successful start to the 2021–22 season, Team Fleury entered the Trials as the topped ranked women's team. Through the round robin, the team went undefeated with a perfect 8–0 record, becoming only the second women's rink to do so following Chelsea Carey in 2017. This earned them a bye to the Olympic Trials final where they would face Team Jennifer Jones, who they previously defeated in their final round robin game. The team began the game with hammer, but immediately gave up a stolen point. They eventually tied the game after four ends, and later after seven ends 4–4. After a blank in the eighth, Team Fleury earned their first lead of the game with a steal of one in the ninth. In the tenth end, Jennifer Jones had an open hit-and-stick to win the game, however, her shooter rolled two far and she only got one. This sent the game to an extra end where Team Fleury would hold the hammer. On her final shot, Fleury attempted a soft-weight hit on a Jones stone partially buried behind a guard. Her rock, however, curled too much and hit the guard, giving up a steal of one and the game to Team Jones. About her last shot, Fleury said that "I felt close but then it just kind of caught the curl." Team Fleury earned the silver medal from the event, the first ever medal for Fleury at a national event.

At the 2022 Manitoba Scotties Tournament of Hearts, the team couldn't rebound from their disappointing finish at the Trials, finishing 5–3 and failing to qualify for the playoff round. Despite this, they still qualified for the 2022 Scotties Tournament of Hearts, again as Wild Card #1 after Curling Canada used the same format from the 2021 event. Upon arrival into Thunder Bay for the event, the team announced that Fleury had tested positive for COVID-19 and would have to sit out much of the event. This moved Selena Njegovan up to skip the team with alternate Robyn Njegovan stepping up to play third. Without Fleury, the team had a dominant performance through their seven games, finishing with a 6–1 record. Fleury then returned for the teams' final round robin game where they picked up another victory to close out the round robin first place in their pool. Despite earning a bye from the elimination games, the team lost the seeding game and then the 3 vs. 4 page playoff game, eliminating them from the event in fourth place.

On March 16, 2022, the team announced they would be parting ways at the end of the 2021–22 season. Njegovan and MacCuish later announced they would be joining Kaitlyn Lawes and Jocelyn Peterman, while Fyfe would be joining Chelsea Carey for the next quadrennial. This left Fleury without a team, however, on March 25, 2022, Team Rachel Homan announced that Fleury would be joining their Ottawa-based rink for the 2022–23 season, replacing Joanne Courtney who had decided to take a break from competitive women's curling. Homan's teammates Emma Miskew and Sarah Wilkes would play second and lead respectively, while Fleury and Homan would play third and skip, however, had not decided their exact lineup.

Team Fleury still had two more events together before parting ways, the 2022 Players' Championship and 2022 Champions Cup Grand Slams. At the Players', the team qualified through the A-side with an undefeated record, earning them the top spot in the playoff round. They then defeated Sweden's Isabella Wranå in the quarterfinals before being eliminated by the Einarson team in the semifinals. At the Champions Cup, Team Fleury went 3–2 in pool play, and then lost in the quarterfinals to Gim Eun-ji.

=== 2022–present ===
In August 2022, it was announced that Fleury would be skipping Team Homan playing third, with Rachel Homan throwing last rocks on the team. The new lineup made their debut at the 2022 Saville Shoot-Out, making it to the final before losing to Jennifer Jones and her new team. Later on in the month, Team Homan played in the inaugural PointsBet Invitational tournament organized by Curling Canada. The team made it to the quarterfinals, where they lost to Team Scheidegger, which was skipped by Kristie Moore in a draw-to-the button to break a 6–6 tie. The next month in October, the team played in the first Slam of the season, the 2022 National. There, the team made it to the quarterfinals before losing out to another new-look team skipped by Kaitlyn Lawes. Later that month, the team played in the next Slam, the 2022 Tour Challenge. The team won the event, defeating Kerri Einarson 8–4 in the final, securing Fleury's third Slam title. In November, the team won their second Tour event of the season at the Red Deer Curling Classic, defeating Casey Scheidegger in the final. In December, the team played in their third Slam of the season, the 2022 Masters. The team made it to the final against Team Einarson again, but this time Einarson had the best of them, beating Team Homan 6–5 in an extra end. In January, the team played in the 2023 Canadian Open, making it as far as the quarterfinals this time before matching up against Einarson. Team Homan couldn't get past Einarson again, and were eliminated after a 7–2 decision. Later in the month, the team won the 2023 Ontario Scotties Tournament of Hearts, Fleury's second Ontario provincial championship. They defeated Hollie Duncan in the final. The team represented Ontario at the 2023 Scotties Tournament of Hearts, going 6–2 in pool play. This put the team into the Championship round, where they were eliminated after a loss to Nova Scotia, skipped by Christina Black. In February, Fleury teamed up with her brother Jacob Horgan to win the Northern Ontario Mixed Doubles provincial title. This qualified the pair to represent Northern Ontario at the 2023 Canadian Mixed Doubles Curling Championship, where they finished just outside the playoffs with a 4–3 record. In April, Team Homan played in the 2023 Players' Championship, missing the playoffs, but rebounded to win the 2023 Champions Cup to cap off the season. The team beat their rivals in the Kerri Einarson rink in the final, coming back from a 4–0 deficit to win the championship 6–5, giving Fleury her fourth career Grand Slam title. For the event, Homan replaced Fleury as the skip of the team, as it was announced she was pregnant.

At the beginning of the 2023–24 season, it was announced that Homan would take over as skip of the team, with Fleury taking on regular third duties. The team also brought in former World Men's Champion and Olympic silver medallist Don Bartlett as their coach. The team began the season without Homan, who had just given birth to her third child. With Heather Nedohin in her place, the team went on to win the 2023 Saville Shootout. Homan returned to her team for the 2023 PointsBet Invitational, where they made it to the final, beating Kerri Einarson there 9–7 to claim the title, and $50,000 in the process. Three weeks later, Team Homan played in their first Slam of the season, the 2023 Tour Challenge. There, the team went 2–2, being eliminated from playoff contention due to a poor tournament draw to the button shootout score. The team made it to the final in the next Slam, the 2023 National. There, they went undefeated until they faced the equally undefeated Gim Eun-ji Korean rink in that game, which they lost 7–6. A week later, the team played in the Red Deer Curling Classic again, winning their second straight title after easily defeating the Selena Sturmay rink in the final, 8–1. The team continued their success in December, winning the 2023 Masters, Fleury's fifth career Grand Slam, and first of the season. They defeated Silvana Tirinzoni of Switzerland in the final, 8–4. A month later, the team won their second slam title in a row, and Fleury's sixth in her career when the rink downed Tirinzoni again in the final of the 2024 Canadian Open. The team won 5–4, stealing the game in an extra end, after trailing 4–2 after the seventh end.

New qualifying rules for the Scotties Tournament of Hearts allowed Team Homan a pre-qualifying spot at the 2024 Scotties Tournament of Hearts without having to play in the 2024 playdowns. At the Hearts, the team went undefeated, winning all eleven of their games, including the final, where they beat Jennifer Jones, another pre-qualifier team, 5–4. It was Jones' last Hearts, as she decided to retire prior to the event. The win was Fleury's first career Hearts title.

With the Scotties win, the team went on to represent Canada at the 2024 World Women's Curling Championship. At the Worlds, the team had an unmatched 11–1 round robin record which included ending Switzerland and Silvana Tirinzoni's 42 game winning streak at the Women's Worlds, which dated back to the 2021 Worlds. Their only defeat came against South Korea (skipped by Gim Eun-ji) in the last draw, a meaningless game for the team, as they had clinched first place and a bye to the semifinals. Team Canada faced-off against the Koreans again in the semifinals, and this time beat them, 9–7. This put them into the final, where they faced off against the four-time defending World Champion Tirinzoni team. Heading into the ninth end of the game, the team was down 5–4 to the Swiss, but Homan made a split of a rock in the 12-foot on her last to score three, giving her team a 7–5 lead. Switzerland conceded the game in the 10th after deciding they didn't have a shot to tie the game, giving Fleury her first World Championship title in her first appearance at the event.

Team Homan ended the 2023–24 season at the 2024 Players' Championship. The rink went undefeated in the tournament until the semifinal, where they lost to the same Tirinzoni rink they had beaten in the World Championship final. Team Homan would finish the season with an "unprecedented" 67–7 win-loss record.

In August 2025, it was announced that the team had found a new coach in two-time World bronze medallist Heather Nedohin, who had spared for the rink in 2023 while Homan was pregnant. In the team's first event of the 2025–26 curling season, they lost to Denmark's Madeleine Dupont in the semifinal of the 2025 AMJ Campbell Shorty Jenkins Classic. Two weeks later, the team played in their first Slam of the season, the AMJ Masters. The team won all seven of their games at the event, defeating rivals Silvana Tirinzoni in the final, 6–4. It was Fleury's 9th career Slam. Team Homan would then go on to win their second slam of the season at the 2025 Tour Challenge, again defeating Tirinzoni in the final. Team Homan would continue their dominance at the 2025 GSOC Tahoe, defeating Tirinzoni in the third straight slam final of the season.

The Homan rink would complete their bid to represent Canada at the 2026 Winter Olympics by winning the 2025 Canadian Olympic Curling Trials, winning both games against Christina Black in the best-of-three final, marking Fleury's first Olympic appearance.

== Personal life ==
Outside of curling, Fleury is a manager of financial reporting with Laurentian University. She started curling when she was five years old when her father Gerry Horgan put her in the little rocks program with her sister Jennifer Wylie at the Idylwylde Golf & Country Club in Sudbury. Her brothers Tanner and Jacob are also successful Northern Ontario junior curlers, winning silver medals at the 2016 and 2018 Canadian Junior Curling Championships and a bronze medal in 2017. Jacob also won the 2017 Canadian U18 Curling Championships. Tracy is married to Brent Fleury and has one child, Nina, whom she gave birth to in July 2020.

== Grand Slam record ==
Fleury has won eleven Grand Slam events throughout her career. Her first title came at the 2019 Masters, where she defeated Sayaka Yoshimura 7–5 in the final. She then won the 2021 Masters, winning 9–7 in an extra end against Jennifer Jones.

Since joining the Rachel Homan rink, Fleury has won nine Slam titles.

Key
C	Champion
F	Lost in Final
SF	Lost in Semifinal
QF	Lost in Quarterfinals
R16	Lost in the round of 16
Q	Did not advance to playoffs
T2	Played in Tier 2 event
DNP	Did not participate in event
N/A	Not a Grand Slam event that season

Event	2012–13	2013–14	2014–15	2015–16	2016–17	2017–18	2018–19	2019–20	2020–21	2021–22	2022–23	2023–24	2024–25	2025–26	2026–27
Invitational	N/A	N/A	N/A	SF	QF	Q	F	QF	N/A	N/A	C	Q	F	C	Q
Masters	QF	DNP	DNP	Q	Q	DNP	QF	C	N/A	C	F	C	F	C	QF
National	N/A	N/A	N/A	F	Q	SF	Q	SF	N/A	F	QF	F	C	C	SF
Open	N/A	N/A	DNP	QF	QF	DNP	Q	Q	N/A	N/A	QF	C	C	QF	
Players'	DNP	DNP	DNP	Q	QF	DNP	QF	N/A	DNP	SF	Q	SF	F	SF	
Champions Cup	N/A	N/A	N/A	DNP	DNP	DNP	DNP	N/A	SF	QF	C	N/A	N/A	N/A	N/A

=== Former events ===
Event	2011–12	2012–13	2013–14	2014–15	2015–16	2016–17	2017–18	2018–19
Elite 10	N/A	N/A	N/A	N/A	N/A	N/A	N/A	Q
Autumn Gold	Q	Q	Q	QF	N/A	N/A	N/A	N/A
Manitoba Liquor & Lotteries	DNP	Q	Q	N/A	N/A	N/A	N/A	N/A
Colonial Square	N/A	Q	DNP	DNP	N/A	N/A	N/A	N/A

== Teams ==
Season	Skip	Third	Second	Lead	Alternate	Tour earnings (rank) (CAD)	Coach
2001–02	Jennifer Horgan	Tracy Horgan	Tanya Courchesne	Nicole Dubuc		N/A	Gerry Horgan
2004–05	Tracy Horgan (Fourth)	Amanda Gates	Jennifer Horgan (Skip)	Stephanie Barbeau		N/A	Gerry Horgan
2005–06	Tracy Horgan	Lindsay Miners	Amanda Gates	Stephanie Barbeau		N/A	Gerry Horgan
2006–07	Tracy Horgan	Amanda Gates	Tara Stephen	Stephanie Barbeau		N/A	Gerry Horgan
2007–08	Tracy Horgan	Jennifer Horgan	Amanda Gates	Andrea Souliere-Poland		N/A	Gerry Horgan
2008–09	Tracy Horgan	Jennifer Horgan	Amanda Gates	Andrea Souliere-Poland		DNP	Gerry Horgan
2009–10	Tracy Horgan	Jennifer Horgan	Amanda Gates	Andrea Souliere-Poland		DNP	Gerry Horgan
2010–11	Tracy Horgan	Jennifer Seabrook	Jenna Enge	Amanda Gates		$10,500 (21st)	Gerry Horgan
2011–12	Tracy Horgan	Jennifer Seabrook	Jenna Enge	Amanda Gates	Jen Gates (STOH)	$200 (111th)	Gerry Horgan
2012–13	Tracy Horgan	Jennifer Horgan	Jenna Enge	Amanda Gates		$20,400 (16th)	Gerry Horgan
2013–14	Tracy Horgan	Jennifer Horgan	Jenna Enge	Amanda Gates	Kendra Lilly (RTTR)	$7,000 (31st)	Gerry Horgan
2014–15	Tracy Horgan	Jennifer Horgan	Jenna Enge	Amanda Gates	Courtney Chenier	$21,641 (15th)	Andrea Ronnenbeck
2015–16	Tracy Fleury	Jennifer Horgan	Jenna Walsh	Amanda Gates	Crystal Webster	$46,993 (9th)	Andrea Ronnenbeck
2016–17	Tracy Fleury	Jennifer Wylie	Jenna Walsh	Amanda Gates	Crystal Webster	$47,203 (10th)	Andrea Ronnenbeck
2017–18	Tracy Fleury	Crystal Webster	Jenna Walsh	Amanda Gates	Jennifer Wylie	$16,950 (23rd)	Andrea Ronnenbeck
2018–19	Tracy Fleury	Selena Njegovan	Liz Fyfe	Kristin MacCuish	Taylor McDonald	$59,731 (14th)	Andrea Ronnenbeck
2019–20	Tracy Fleury	Selena Njegovan	Liz Fyfe	Kristin MacCuish		$85,730 (3rd)	Jill Officer
2020–21	Tracy Fleury	Selena Njegovan	Liz Fyfe	Kristin MacCuish	Chelsea Carey	$18,000 (NR) (Note: Due to the COVID-19 pandemic, there was no official money ranking for this season. Fleury won $12,000 at the Champions Cup and $6,000 at the Players' Championship.)	Sherry Middaugh
2021–22	Tracy Fleury	Selena Njegovan	Liz Fyfe	Kristin MacCuish	Chelsea Carey (COCT); Robyn Njegovan (STOH)	$95,628 (2nd) (Note: Following the 2020–21 season, tour money rankings were no longer published. Ranking displayed is the end of season World Curling Federation team ranking.)	Sherry Middaugh
2022–23	Rachel Homan (Fourth)	Tracy Fleury (Skip)	Emma Miskew	Sarah Wilkes	Kira Brunton (STOH); Rachelle Brown (GSOC)	$123,000 (3rd)	Ryan Fry
2023–24	Rachel Homan	Tracy Fleury	Emma Miskew	Sarah Wilkes	Rachelle Brown	$203,000 (1st)	Don Bartlett
2024–25	Rachel Homan	Tracy Fleury	Emma Miskew	Sarah Wilkes	Rachelle Brown	$255,000 (1st)	Brendan Bottcher (Sept. – Oct.); Jennifer Jones (STOH)
2025–26	Rachel Homan	Tracy Fleury	Emma Miskew	Sarah Wilkes	Rachelle Brown		
