= 2019 NOCA Men's Provincial Championship =

- Host city: Nipigon, Ontario
- Arena: Nipigon Curling Club
- Dates: January 30 – February 3
- Winner: Team Jacobs
- Curling club: Community First Curling Club, Sault Ste. Marie
- Skip: Brad Jacobs
- Third: Ryan Fry
- Second: E. J. Harnden
- Lead: Ryan Harnden
- Coach: Adam Kingsbury
- Finalist: Tanner Horgan

The 2019 NOCA Men's Provincial Championship, the "provincial" men's curling championship of Northern Ontario was held from January 30 to February 2 at the Nipigon Curling Club in Nipigon, Ontario. The winning team of skip Brad Jacobs, third Ryan Fry, second E.J. Harnden and lead Ryan Harnden represented Northern Ontario at the 2019 Tim Hortons Brier in Brandon, Manitoba, Canada's national men's curling championship. The final was a rematch of the previous year's championship, with Jacobs prevailing once again. Team Jacobs defeated Team Horgan with a final score of 7-5. This was the 11th time that the rink represented Northern Ontario. The event was held in conjunction with the 2019 Northern Ontario Scotties Tournament of Hearts, Northern Ontario's women's championship.

== Teams ==
Teams were as follows:

Skip	Third	Second	Lead	Alternate	Club(s)
Trevor Bonot	Al Hackner	Jamie Childs	Gary Champagne	Mike Desilets	Fort William Curling Club, Thunder Bay
Jordan Chandler	Sandy MacEwan	Lee Toner	Luc Ouimet		Curl Sudbury, Sudbury
Rob Gordon	Shane Gordon	Mark Robinson	Frederic Diebel		Curl Sudbury, Sudbury
Tanner Horgan	Mark Kean	Jacob Horgan	Maxime Blais		Curl Sudbury, Sudbury
Brad Jacobs	Ryan Fry	E. J. Harnden	Ryan Harnden		Community First Curling Club, Sault Ste. Marie
Dylan Johnston	Mike Badiuk	Cody Johnston	Travis Showalter	Chris Briand	Fort William Curling Club, Thunder Bay
Mike McCarville	Jordan Potter	Zach Warkentin	Travis Potter		Fort William Curling Club, Thunder Bay
Dustin Montpellier	Jason Strelezki	Chris Gordon	Matt Gordon		Copper Cliff Curling Club, Sudbury

== Round robin standings ==
Key
Teams to Playoffs
Teams to Tiebreaker

Skip	W	L
Horgan	7	0
Jacobs	6	1
McCarville	4	3
Bonot	4	3
Gordon	3	4
Johnston	2	5
Chandler	2	5
Montpellier	0	7

== Scores ==
=== January 30 ===
Draw 1

- Jacobs 4-2 McCarville
- Horgan 8-4 Chandler

Draw 2

- Horgan 5-3 Montpellier
- Jacobs 10-4 Gordon
- Johnston 9-7 Chandler
- McCarville 7-4 Bonot

=== January 31 ===
Draw 3

- Bonot 10-5 Gordon
- Johnston 7-3 Montpellier

Draw 4

- Bonot 11-7 Chandler
- McCarville 7-4 Johnston
- Jacobs 9-3 Montpellier
- Horgan 10-4 Gordon

Draw 5

- Horgan 9-7 McCarville
- Jacobs 7-1 Chandler

=== February 1 ===
Draw 6

- Jacobs 7-5 Johnston
- Horgan 4-2 Bonot
- Gordon 7-5 McCarville
- Chandler 10-5 Montpellier

Draw 7

- Bonot 11-6 Montpellier
- Gordon 10-7 Johnston

Draw 8

- Horgan 9-6 Jacobs
- McCarville 6-5 Chandler

=== February 2 ===
Draw 9

- Chandler 9-7 Gordon
- McCarville 9-3 Montpellier
- Horgan 9-4 Johnston
- Jacobs 9-1 Bonot

Draw 10

- Gordon 8-4 Montpellier
- Bonot 7-5 Johnston

Tiebreaker

- McCarville 6-5 Bonot

== Playoffs ==
Semifinal			Final
			1	Tanner Horgan	5
2	Brad Jacobs	7	2	Brad Jacobs	7
3	Mike McCarville	6

=== Semifinal ===
Sunday, February 3, 8:30am

Sheet C	1	2	3	4	5	6	7	8	9	10	Final
Brad Jacobs 🔨	1	1	0	0	0	3	0	2	0	0	7
Mike McCarville	0	0	0	1	0	0	1	0	2	2	6

=== Final ===
Sunday, February 3, 5:30pm

Sheet C	1	2	3	4	5	6	7	8	9	10	Final
Tanner Horgan 🔨	1	0	1	0	2	0	0	1	0	X	5
Brad Jacobs	0	2	0	2	0	2	1	0	0	X	7

2019 NOCA Men's Provincial Championship

Brad Jacobs
11th Northern Ontario Provincial Championship title
