= 2018 Travelers Northern Ontario Men's Curling Championship =

- Host city: Little Current, Ontario
- Arena: NEMI Rec Centre
- Dates: February 7–11
- Winner: Team Jacobs
- Curling club: Community First CC, Sault Ste. Marie
- Skip: Brad Jacobs
- Third: Ryan Fry
- Second: E. J. Harnden
- Lead: Ryan Harnden
- Coach: Caleb Flaxey
- Finalist: Tanner Horgan

The 2018 Travelers Men's NOCA Provincials, the provincial men's curling championship of Northern Ontario was held February 7–11 at the NEMI Rec Centre in Little Current, Ontario. The winning Brad Jacobs team represented Northern Ontario at the 2018 Tim Hortons Brier in Regina, Saskatchewan.

== Teams ==
Teams are as follows:

Skip	Third	Second	Lead	Alternate	Club(s)
Jordan Chandler	Sandy MacEwan	Luc Ouimet	Lee Toner	Kyle Chandler	Curl Sudbury, Sudbury
Matt Dumontelle	Jeff Brown	Gavan Jamieson	Bobby Ray		North Bay Granite Club, North Bay
Tanner Horgan	Jacob Horgan	Nicholas Bissonnette	Maxime Blais		Copper Cliff Curling Club, Sudbury
Brad Jacobs	Ryan Fry	E. J. Harnden	Ryan Harnden		Community First Curling Club, Sault Ste. Marie
Dylan Johnston	Mike Badiuk	Cody Johnston	Travis Showalter	Chris Briand	Fort William Curling Club, Thunder Bay
Colin Koivula	Brennan Wark	Jordan Potts	Mark Adams		Fort Willian Curling Club, Thunder Bay
Dustin Montpellier	Eric Gelinas	Cody Tetreault	Matt Gordon	Chris Glibota	Copper Cliff Curling Club, Sudbury
Charlie Robert	Dan Mick	Clint Cudmore	Marc Barrette		Community First Curling Centre, Sault Ste. Marie

== Round-robin standings ==
Key
Teams to Playoffs

Skip	W	L
Horgan	7	0
Chandler	5	2
Jacobs	5	2
Johnston	5	2
Montipiler	3	3
Robert	2	4
Duomontelle	1	6
Kolivula	0	7

== Scores ==
=== February 7 ===
Draw 1

- Jacobs 6-4 Koivula
- Johnston 5-4 Robert
- Horgan 7-3 Dumontelle
- Chandler 5-4 Montpellier

Draw 2

- Montpellier 8-7 Dumontelle
- Horgan 6-2 Chandler
- Jacobs 8-2 Robert
- Johnston 7-4 Koivula

=== February 8 ===
Draw 3

- Horgan 9-3 Robert
- Montpellier 7-5 Koivula
- Chandler 7-5 Johnston
- Jacobs 7-3 Duontelle

Draw 4

- Johnston 9-2 Dumontelle
- Jacobs 7-6 Chandler
- Horgan 8-5 Koivula
- Montpellier 12-7 Robert

=== February 9 ===
Draw 5

- Chandler 7-2 Koivula
- Robert 5-2 Dumontelle
- Johnston 8-3 Montpellier
- Horgan 7-3 Jacobs

Draw 6

- Johnston 6-5 Jacobs
- Horgan 4-2 Montpellier
- Robert 6-1 Koivula
- Chandler 8-3 Dumontelle

=== February 10 ===
Draw 7

- Chandler 6-3 Robert
- Dumontelle 8-7 Koivula
- Jacobs 8-5 Montpellier
- Horgan 9-4 Johnston

=== Playoffs ===
Tiebreaker
3	Brad Jacobs	5
4	Dylan Johnston	3

Semifinal
2	Jordan Chandler	3
3	Brad Jacobs	5

Final
1	Tanner Horgan	5
3	Brad Jacobs	6

==== Semifinal ====
February 10, 7:30 pm

Sheet C	1	2	3	4	5	6	7	8	9	10	Final
Jordan Chandler	0	1	0	0	0	0	0	2	0	X	3
Brad Jacobs 🔨	1	0	0	0	0	2	0	0	2	X	5

==== Final ====
February 11, 2:00 pm

Sheet C	1	2	3	4	5	6	7	8	9	10	Final
Tanner Horgan 🔨	0	2	0	0	0	0	3	0	0	0	5
Brad Jacobs	0	0	0	0	1	1	0	2	1	1	6

2018 Travelers Northern Ontario Men's Curling Championship

Brad Jacobs
10th Northern Ontario Provincial Championship title
