= 2016 Travelers Men's NOCA Provincials =

- Host city: North Bay, Ontario
- Arena: North Bay Granite Curling Club
- Dates: February 10–14
- Winner: Team Jacobs
- Curling club: Community First CC, Sault Ste. Marie
- Skip: Brad Jacobs
- Third: Ryan Fry
- Second: E. J. Harnden
- Lead: Ryan Harnden
- Finalist: Jordan Chandler

The 2016 Travelers Northern Ontario Men's Provincial Championship, the "provincial" men's curling championship of Northern Ontario was held February 10–14 at the North Bay Granite Curling Club in North Bay, Ontario. The winning Brad Jacobs team represented Northern Ontario at the 2016 Tim Hortons Brier in Ottawa.

== Teams ==
Skip	Third	Second	Lead	Alternate	Club(s)
Mike Assad	Mitch Shallow	Andrew Hackner	Dwayne Sutherland		Geraldton Curling Club, Geraldton
Jordan Chandler	Matt Dumontelle	Sandy MacEwan	Lee Toner		Sudbury Curling Club, Sudbury
Patrick Gelinas	Arty Trudel	Eric Gelinas	Luc Gelinas		Voyageur Curling Club, Mattawa
Rob Gordon	Ron Henderson	Dion Dumontelle	Doug Hong	Keith Furevick	Sudbury Curling Club, Sudbury
Tanner Horgan	Jacob Horgan	Maxime Blais	Scott Foy		Copper Cliff Curling Club, Copper Cliff
Brad Jacobs	Ryan Fry	E. J. Harnden	Ryan Harnden		Community First Curling Centre, Sault Ste. Marie
Dylan Johnston	Mike Badiuk	Chris Briand	Travis Showalter		Fort William Curling Club, Thunder Bay
Colin Koivula	Kory Carr	Jordan Potts	Jamie Childs		Port Arthur Curling Club, Thunder Bay

== Round robin standings ==
Key
Teams to Playoffs

Skip	W	L
Jacobs	6	1
Chandler	5	2
Koivula	4	3
Johnston	3	4
Assad	3	4
Horgan	3	4
Gelinas	2	5
Gordon	2	5

== Scores ==
=== February 10 ===
Draw 1

- Jacobs 8-4 Horgan
- Gelinas 7-2 Koivula
- Assad 9-6 Gordon
- Chandler 10-4 Johnston

Draw 2

- Assad 8-7 Johnston
- Chandler 6-4 Gordon
- Koivula 5-4 Horgan
- Jacobs 7-6 Gelinas

=== February 11 ===
Draw 3

- Koivula 7-6 Gordon
- Johnston 8-5 Jacobs
- Chandler 6-2 Gelinas
- Horgan 7-6 Assad

Draw 4

- Assad 8-7 Gelinas
- Horgan 7-2 Chandler
- Jacobs 6-3 Gordon
- Koivula 7-6 Johnston

=== February 12 ===
Draw 5

- Jacobs 8-3 Chandler
- Koivula 8-6 Assad
- Johnston 9-3 Gelinas
- Horgan 9-6 Gordon

Draw 6

- Horgan 9-3 Gelinas
- Gordon 8-2 Johnston
- Jacobs 9-2 Koivula
- Chandler 6-5 Assad

=== February 13 ===
Draw 7

- Chandler 7-0 Koivula
- Jacobs 5-2 Assad
- Johnston 9-6 Horgan
- Gelinas 6-5 Gordon

== Playoffs ==
Semifinal			Final
			1	Brad Jacobs	5
2	Jordan Chandler	7	2	Jordan Chandler	0
3	Colin Koivula	4

=== Semifinal ===
Saturday, February 13, 7:30 pm

Sheet C	1	2	3	4	5	6	7	8	9	10	Final
Jordan Chandler 🔨	0	0	3	0	0	0	2	0	2	X	7
Colin Koivula	0	2	0	0	1	0	0	1	0	X	4

=== Final ===
Sunday, February 14, 2:00 pm

Sheet C	1	2	3	4	5	6	7	8	9	10	Final
Brad Jacobs 🔨	2	0	0	0	1	0	0	2	X	X	5
Jordan Chandler	0	0	0	0	0	0	0	0	X	X	0

2016 Travelers Men's NOCA Provincials

Brad Jacobs
8th Northern Ontario Provincial Championship title
