= 2015 Travelers Men's NOCA Provincials =

- Host city: Kenora, Ontario
- Arena: Kenora Recreation Centre
- Dates: February 4–8
- Winner: Team Jacobs
- Curling club: Community First CC, Sault Ste. Marie
- Skip: Brad Jacobs
- Third: Ryan Fry
- Second: E. J. Harnden
- Lead: Ryan Harnden
- Finalist: Al Hackner

The 2015 Travelers Northern Ontario Men's Provincial Championship, the "provincial" men's curling championship of Northern Ontario was held February 4–8 at the Kenora Recreation Centre in Kenora, Ontario. The winning Brad Jacobs team represented Northern Ontario at the 2015 Tim Hortons Brier in Calgary.

== Teams ==
Skip	Third	Second	Lead	Alternate	Club(s)
Bryan Burgess	Rob Champagne	Al Macsemchuk	Pat Berezowski		Kakabeka Falls Curling Club, Kakabeka Falls
Jeff Currie	Mike McCarville	Colin Koivula	Jamie Childs		Fort William Curling Club, Thunder Bay
Chris Glibota	Matt Mann	Kyle Sherlock	Mark Dugas	Randy Glibota	Soo Curlers Association, Sault Ste. Marie
Al Hackner	Frank Morissette	Kris Leupen	Gary Champagne		Fort William Curling Club, Thunder Bay
Brad Jacobs	Ryan Fry	E. J. Harnden	Ryan Harnden		Soo Curlers Association, Sault Ste. Marie
Mike Jakubo	Jordan Chandler	Sandy MacEwan	Lee Toner		Sudbury Curling Club, Sudbury
Dylan Johnston	Mike Badiuk	Chris Briand	Travis Showalter		Fort William Curling Club, Thunder Bay
Ben Mikkelsen	Taylor Kallos	B. J. Skinner	Dave Durant		Fort William Curling Club, Thunder Bay

== Round robin standings ==
Key
Teams to Playoffs

Skip	W	L
Jacobs	7	0
Johnston	6	1
Hackner	5	2
Jakubo	4	3
Burgess	2	5
Currie	2	5
Mikkelsen	1	6
Glibota	1	6

== Scores ==
=== February 4 ===
Draw 1

- Jacobs 6-1 Glibota
- Hackner 6-4 Currie
- Johnston 7-2 Burgess
- Jakubo 6-5 Mikkelsen

Draw 2

- Johnston 4-3 Jakubo
- Burgess 9-5 Mikkelsen
- Hackner 7-4 Glibota
- Jacobs 7-4 Currie

=== February 5 ===
Draw 3

- Hackner 7-6 Burgess
- Jacobs 4-3 Jakubo
- Currie 6-3 Mikkelsen
- Johnston 8-3 Glibota

Draw 4

- Johnston 7-5 Currie
- Mikkelsen 7-1 Glibota
- Jacobs 9-4 Burgess
- Hackner 6-3 Jakubo

=== February 6 ===
Draw 5

- Jacobs 9-3 Mikkelsen
- Johnston 9-8 Hackner
- Jakubo 7-3 Currie
- Glibota 6-5 Burgess

Draw 6

- Currie 6-5 Glibota
- Jakubo 5-2 Burgess
- Jacobs 6-4 Hackner
- Johnston 6-4 Mikkelsen

=== February 7 ===
Draw 7

- Hackner 9-3 Mikkelsen
- Jacobs 6-3 Johnston
- Jakubo 7-1 Glibota
- Burgess 6-2 Currie

== Playoffs ==
Semifinal			Final
			1	Brad Jacobs	7
2	Dylan Johnston	4	3	Al Hackner	4
3	Al Hackner	5

=== Final ===
Team	1	2	3	4	5	6	7	8	9	10	Final
Brad Jacobs 🔨	0	2	0	0	2	1	0	0	2	X	7
Al Hackner	0	0	0	2	0	0	2	0	0	X	4

2015 Travelers Men's NOCA Provincials

Brad Jacobs
7th Northern Ontario Provincial Championship title
