= 2017 Travelers Men's NOCA Provincials =

- Host city: Thunder Bay, Ontario
- Arena: Fort William Curling Club
- Dates: February 8–12
- Winner: Team Jacobs
- Curling club: Community First CC, Sault Ste. Marie
- Skip: Brad Jacobs
- Third: Ryan Fry
- Second: E. J. Harnden
- Lead: Ryan Harnden
- Finalist: Dylan Johnston

The 2017 Travelers Northern Ontario Men's Provincial Championship, the "provincial" men's curling championship of Northern Ontario was held February 8–12 at the Fort William Curling Club in Thunder Bay, Ontario. The winning Brad Jacobs team represented Northern Ontario at the 2017 Tim Hortons Brier in St. John's, Newfoundland and Labrador.

== Teams ==
Teams are as follows:

Skip	Third	Second	Lead	Alternate	Club(s)
Bryan Burgess	Rob Champagne	Al Macsemchuk	Pat Berezowski		Kakabeka Falls Curling Club, Kakabeka Falls
Jordan Chandler	Sandy MacEwan	Luc Ouimet	Lee Toner		Sudbury Curling Club, Sudbury
Chris Glibota	Dustin Montellier	Eric Gelinas	Matt Gordon		Copper Cliff Curling Club, Sudbury
Tanner Horgan	Jacob Horgan	Nicholas Bissonnette	Maxime Blais		Copper Cliff Curling Club, Sudbury
Brad Jacobs	Ryan Fry	E. J. Harnden	Ryan Harnden		Community First Curling Centre, Sault Ste. Marie
Dylan Johnston	Mike Badiuk	Cody Johnston	Travis Showalter	Chris Briand	Fort William Curling Club, Thunder Bay
Al Hackner	Kory Carr	Frank Morissette	Gary Champagne		Fort William Curling Club, Thunder Bay
Ryan Sayer	Graehem Sayer	Ryan Forget	Gavan Jamieson		Horne Granite Curling Club, New Liskeard

== Round robin standings ==
Key
Teams to Playoffs

Skip	W	L
Jacobs	7	0
Johnston	5	2
Glibota	4	3
Chandler	3	4
Burgess	3	4
Horgan	3	4
Hackner	3	4
Sayer	0	7

== Scores ==
=== February 8 ===
Draw 1

- Jacobs 7-2 Sayer
- Chandler 6-5 Horgan
- Burgess 7-4 Hackner
- Johnston 6-5 Glibota

Draw 2

- Hackner 10-5 Glibota
- Burgess 6-5 Johnston
- Sayer 5-6 Horgan
- Jacobs 7-1 Chandler

=== February 9 ===
Draw 3

- Horgan 8-6 Burgess
- Jacobs 9-4 Glibota
- Johnston 7-0 Chandler
- Hackner 6-1 Sayer

Draw 4

- Chandler 6-0 Hackner
- Johnston 10-2 Sayer
- Burgess 3-8 Jacobs
- Glibota 7-5 Horgan

=== February 10 ===
Draw 5

- Johnston 2-8 Jacobs
- Horgan 4-8 Hackner
- Glibota 7-1 Chandler
- Burgess 8-5 Sayer

Draw 6

- Sayer 5-12 Chandler
- Burgess 5-8 Glibota
- Horgan 3-8 Jacobs
- Hackner 6-9 Johnston

=== February 11 ===
Draw 7

- Horgan 6-4 Johnston
- Jacobs 6-5 Hackner
- Glibota 8-2 Sayer
- Burgess 9-5 Chandler

== Playoffs ==
Semifinal			Final
			1	Brad Jacobs	6
2	Dylan Johnston	8	2	Dylan Johnston	3
3	Chris Glibota	7

=== Semifinal ===
Saturday, February 11, 7:30 pm

Sheet C	1	2	3	4	5	6	7	8	9	10	Final
Dylan Johnston 🔨	0	1	0	1	0	2	0	3	0	1	8
Chris Glibota	1	0	1	0	2	0	1	0	2	0	7

=== Final ===
Saturday, February 11, 7:30 pm

Sheet C	1	2	3	4	5	6	7	8	9	10	Final
Brad Jacobs 🔨	0	2	0	1	0	0	2	0	1	X	6
Dylan Johnston	0	0	0	0	1	0	0	2	0	X	3

2017 Travelers Men's NOCA Provincials

Brad Jacobs
9th Northern Ontario Provincial Championship title
