= 2022 Northern Ontario Men's Provincial Curling Championship =

- Host city: Sault Ste. Marie, Ontario
- Arena: Community First Curling Centre
- Dates: February 10–13
- Winner: Team Jacobs
- Curling club: Community First CC, Sault Ste. Marie
- Skip: Brad Jacobs
- Third: E. J. Harnden
- Second: Jordan Chandler
- Lead: Ryan Harnden
- Finalist: Sandy MacEwan

The 2022 Northern Ontario Men's Provincial Curling Championship, the men's provincial curling championship for Northern Ontario, was held from February 10 to 13 at the Community First Curling Centre in Sault Ste. Marie, Ontario. The winning Brad Jacobs team represented Northern Ontario at the 2022 Tim Hortons Brier, Canada's national men's curling championship in Lethbridge, Alberta.

== Teams ==
The teams are listed as follows:

Skip	Third	Second	Lead	Alternate	Club
Trevor Bonot	Mike McCarville	Jordan Potter	Jordan Potts	Mike Assad	Fort William Curling Club, Thunder Bay
Chris Glibota	Dan Mick	Matt Mann	Marc Barrette		Community First Curling Centre, Sault Ste. Marie
Brad Jacobs	E. J. Harnden	Jordan Chandler	Ryan Harnden		Community First Curling Centre, Sault Ste. Marie
Dylan Johnston	Mike Badiuk	Chris Briand	Kurtis Byrd	Brennan Wark	Fort Frances Curling Club, Fort Frances
Sandy MacEwan	Dustin Montpellier	Lee Toner	Luc Ouimet		Curl Sudbury, Sudbury
Josh Szajewski	Christopher Lock	Wade Shasky	Matthew Schottroff	Michael Szajewski	Keewatin Curling Club, Kenora

== Round-robin standings ==
Final round-robin standings

Key
Teams to Playoffs

Skip	W	L	PF	PA	EW	EL	BE	SE
Sandy MacEwan	4	1	41	20	21	13	1	7
Brad Jacobs	4	1	42	16	22	13	3	9
Trevor Bonot	3	2	24	32	17	16	2	6
Dylan Johnston	3	2	33	23	20	15	0	9
Josh Szajewski	1	4	20	45	12	25	3	1
Chris Glibota	0	5	13	37	12	22	5	2

== Round-robin results ==
All draws are listed in Eastern Time (UTC−05:00).

=== Draw 1 ===
Thursday, February 10, 2:00 pm

Sheet 3	1	2	3	4	5	6	7	8	9	10	Final
Brad Jacobs	1	2	3	0	2	0	2	2	X	X	12
Josh Szajewski 🔨	0	0	0	1	0	1	0	0	X	X	2

Sheet 6	1	2	3	4	5	6	7	8	9	10	Final
Trevor Bonot 🔨	2	1	0	2	1	0	1	0	2	X	9
Dylan Johnston	0	0	2	0	0	2	0	1	0	X	5

Sheet 7	1	2	3	4	5	6	7	8	9	10	Final
Chris Glibota	0	0	1	0	1	0	X	X	X	X	2
Sandy MacEwan 🔨	2	1	0	4	0	3	X	X	X	X	10

=== Draw 2 ===
Friday, February 11, 9:00 am

Sheet 2	1	2	3	4	5	6	7	8	9	10	11	Final
Chris Glibota 🔨	0	1	0	0	0	1	0	2	0	1	0	5
Josh Szajewski	0	0	1	0	1	0	0	0	3	0	1	6

Sheet 3	1	2	3	4	5	6	7	8	9	10	Final
Dylan Johnston 🔨	2	0	1	1	0	2	0	2	X	X	8
Sandy MacEwan	0	1	0	0	1	0	1	0	X	X	3

Sheet 7	1	2	3	4	5	6	7	8	9	10	Final
Brad Jacobs 🔨	0	0	3	2	1	0	0	3	X	X	9
Trevor Bonot	0	0	0	0	0	0	1	0	X	X	1

=== Draw 3 ===
Friday, February 11, 2:00 pm

Sheet 2	1	2	3	4	5	6	7	8	9	10	Final
Brad Jacobs 🔨	2	1	0	2	3	X	X	X	X	X	8
Dylan Johnston	0	0	1	0	0	X	X	X	X	X	1

Sheet 3	1	2	3	4	5	6	7	8	9	10	Final
Trevor Bonot	0	0	1	1	0	0	1	0	0	1	4
Chris Glibota 🔨	0	0	0	0	1	1	0	0	1	0	3

Sheet 6	1	2	3	4	5	6	7	8	9	10	Final
Sandy MacEwan 🔨	1	0	1	1	3	0	4	X	X	X	10
Josh Szajewski	0	0	0	0	0	3	0	X	X	X	3

=== Draw 4 ===
Saturday, February 12, 9:00 am

Sheet 2	1	2	3	4	5	6	7	8	9	10	Final
Sandy MacEwan 🔨	0	3	0	0	3	3	X	X	X	X	9
Trevor Bonot	0	0	1	1	0	0	X	X	X	X	2

Sheet 6	1	2	3	4	5	6	7	8	9	10	Final
Chris Glibota	0	0	1	0	0	1	0	1	0	X	3
Brad Jacobs 🔨	1	1	0	0	2	0	2	0	2	X	8

Sheet 7	1	2	3	4	5	6	7	8	9	10	Final
Josh Szajewski	0	1	0	0	2	0	0	0	X	X	3
Dylan Johnston 🔨	1	0	2	1	0	1	2	3	X	X	10

=== Draw 5 ===
Saturday, February 12, 2:00 pm

Sheet 2	1	2	3	4	5	6	7	8	9	10	Final
Dylan Johnston	1	3	1	1	3	X	X	X	X	X	9
Chris Glibota 🔨	0	0	0	0	0	X	X	X	X	X	0

Sheet 3	1	2	3	4	5	6	7	8	9	10	Final
Sandy MacEwan 🔨	2	0	1	1	1	0	1	0	3	X	9
Brad Jacobs	0	2	0	0	0	2	0	1	0	X	5

Sheet 6	1	2	3	4	5	6	7	8	9	10	Final
Josh Szajewski	0	0	0	2	0	1	0	0	3	X	6
Trevor Bonot 🔨	1	2	0	0	4	0	0	1	0	X	8

== Playoffs ==
Final
1	Sandy MacEwan	5
2	Brad Jacobs	6

=== Final ===
Sunday, February 13, 10:00 am

Sheet 2	1	2	3	4	5	6	7	8	9	10	11	Final
Sandy MacEwan 🔨	0	0	1	0	3	0	0	0	0	1	0	5
Brad Jacobs	0	0	0	2	0	1	1	0	1	0	1	6

2022 Northern Ontario Men's Provincial Curling Championship

Brad Jacobs
13th Northern Ontario Provincial Championship title
