= The Dominion 2013 Northern Ontario Men's Curling Championship =

2013 curling competition

- Host city: Nipigon, Ontario
- Arena: Nipigon Curling Club
- Dates: February 6–10
- Winner: Team Jacobs
- Curling club: Community First CC, Sault Ste. Marie
- Skip: Brad Jacobs
- Third: Ryan Fry
- Second: E. J. Harnden
- Lead: Ryan Harnden
- Finalist: Robbie Gordon

The 2013 Dominion Men's NOCA (Northern Ontario Curling Association) Provincial Curling Championship was held February 6–10 at the Nipigon Curling Club in Nipigon. The winning team of Brad Jacobs represented Northern Ontario at the 2013 Tim Hortons Brier in Edmonton, Alberta.

== Qualification ==
Nine teams qualify for the Northern Ontario men's provincial. The methods of qualification and the teams that qualifier are as follows:

| Qualification method | Berths | Qualifying team |
|---|---|---|
| East Qualifier (Jan. 11-13) | 3 | Robbie Gordon; Mike Jakubo; Matt Dumontelle |
| West Qualifier (Jan. 11-13) | 3 | Trevor Bonot; Bryan Burgess; Jeff Currie |
| East Challenge Round (Jan. 19) | 1 | Jordan Chandler |
| West Challenge Round (Jan. 26-27) | 1 | Al Hackner |
| CTRS leader as of Dec. 31 | 1 | Brad Jacobs |

== Teams ==
Participating teams are as follows:

| Skip | Third | Second | Lead | Club(s) |
|---|---|---|---|---|
| Brad Jacobs | Ryan Fry | E. J. Harnden | Ryan Harnden | Soo Curlers Association, Sault Ste. Marie |
| Bryan Burgess | Mike Pozihun | Dale Weirsema | Pat Berezowski | Port Arthur Curling Club, Thunder Bay |
| Trevor Bonot | Al Macsemchuk | Chris Briand | Mike Badiuk | Port Arthur Curling Club, Thunder Bay |
| Jeff Currie | Mike McCarville | Colin Koivula | Jamie Childs | Fort William Curling Club, Thunder Bay |
| Mike Jakubo | Matt Seabrook | Sandy MacEwan | Lee Toner | Copper Cliff Curling Club, Copper Cliff |
| Robbie Gordon | Ron Henderson | Dion Dumontelle | Doug Hong | Sudbury Curling Club, Sudbury |
| Matt Dumontelle | Dave MacInnes | Steve Burnett | Jeremy Landry | Horne Granite Curling Club, New Liskeard |
| Jordan Chandler | Pat Gelinas | Gavan Jamieson | Tom Cull | North Bay Granite Curling Club, North Bay |
| Al Hackner | Kory Carr | Kris Leupen | Gary Champagne | Fort William Curling Club, Thunder Bay |

== Standings ==
| Skip (Club) | W | L | PF | PA |
|---|---|---|---|---|
| Brad Jacobs (Soo) | 8 | 0 | 52 | 27 |
| Robbie Gordon (Sudbury) | 5 | 3 | 51 | 46 |
| Bryan Burgess (Port Arthur) | 5 | 3 | 44 | 40 |
| Al Hackner (Fort William) | 5 | 3 | 46 | 38 |
| Trevor Bonot (Port Arthur) | 3 | 5 | 37 | 43 |
| Jeff Currie (Fort William) | 3 | 5 | 43 | 44 |
| Matt Dumontelle (Horne Granite) | 3 | 5 | 42 | 56 |
| Mike Jakubo (Copper Cliff) | 3 | 5 | 44 | 46 |
| Jordan Chandler (North Bay Granite) | 1 | 7 | 35 | 55 |

== Scores ==
=== Draw 1 ===
February 6, 14:30

- Bonot 11-5 Dumontelle
- Currie 5-2 Jakubo
- Gordon 6-3 Burgess
- Jacobs 7-3 Chandler

=== Draw 2 ===
February 6, 19:30

- Jacobs 5-4 Gordon
- Burgess 7-6 Jakubo
- Bonot 6-4 Currie
- Hackner 7-2 Dumontelle

=== Draw 3 ===
February 7, 09:30

- Jakubo 8-4 Hackner
- Dumontelle 7-5 Gordon
- Currie 10-5 Chandler
- Jacobs 7-2 Burgess

=== Draw 4 ===
February 7, 14:30

- Burgess 8-5 Chandler
- Gordon 7-5 Currie
- Dumontelle 11-7 Jakubo
- Hackner 7-3 Bonot

=== Draw 5 ===
February 7, 19:30

- Bonot 8-6 Gordon
- Hackner 5-4 Chandler
- Jacobs 7-4 Dumontelle
- Burgess 8-5 Currie

=== Draw 6 ===
February 8, 09:30

- Jacobs 9-4 Currie
- Dumontelle 8-4 Chandler
- Gordon 7-6 Hackner
- Jakubo 5-1 Bonot

=== Draw 7 ===
February 8, 14:30

- Jakubo 6-2 Chandler
- Jacobs 2-1 Bonot
- Hackner 5-4 Burgess
- Currie 8-2 Dumontelle

=== Draw 8 ===
February 8, 19:30

- Burgess 7-3 Dumontelle
- Jacobs 8-7 Hackner
- Chandler 8-4 Bonot
- Gordon 9-8 Jakubo

=== Draw 9 ===
February 9, 09:00

- Hackner 5-2 Currie
- Burgess 6-3 Bonot
- Jacobs 7-2 Jakubo
- Gordon 7-4 Chandler

=== Playoffs ===
| Semifinal | | | Final |
| | | | 1 | Jacobs | 6 |
| 2 | Gordon | 7 | 2 | Gordon | 5 |
| 3 | Burgess | 4 |

==== Semifinal ====
February 9, 19:30

| Sheet B | 1 | 2 | 3 | 4 | 5 | 6 | 7 | 8 | 9 | 10 | Final |
|---|---|---|---|---|---|---|---|---|---|---|---|
| Gordon 🔨 | 0 | 0 | 1 | 0 | 2 | 0 | 1 | 0 | 3 | X | 7 |
| Burgess | 0 | 1 | 0 | 1 | 0 | 1 | 0 | 1 | 0 | X | 4 |

==== Final ====
February 10, 14:30

| Sheet B | 1 | 2 | 3 | 4 | 5 | 6 | 7 | 8 | 9 | 10 | Final |
|---|---|---|---|---|---|---|---|---|---|---|---|
| Jacobs | 0 | 0 | 2 | 0 | 3 | 0 | 0 | 0 | 0 | 1 | 6 |
| Gordon | 0 | 1 | 0 | 1 | 0 | 2 | 0 | 0 | 1 | 0 | 5 |

The Dominion 2013 Northern Ontario Men's Curling Championship

Brad Jacobs
6th Northern Ontario Provincial Championship title
