= Northern Ontario Men's Provincial Curling Championship =

Provincial curling championship in Canada

- Established: 1927
- 2026 host city: North Bay, Ontario
- 2026 arena: North Bay Granite Club
- 2026 champion: Sandy MacEwan

Current edition
- 2026 Northern Ontario Men's Provincial Curling Championship

The Northern Ontario Curling Association (NOCA) Men's Provincial Championship, also known as the Northern Ontario Tankard, is the Northern Ontario provincial championship for men's curling. The winner represents Team Northern Ontario annually at the Montana's Brier. Northern Ontario has been represented at the Brier since 1927 despite not actually being a province.

Since 2024, the winning team receives the Al Hackner Trophy.

== Winners ==
=== 1987–present ===
A playoff was added in 1987.

Year	Team	Winning club	Runner-up skip (club)	Host
2026	Sandy MacEwan, Dustin Montpellier, Luc Ouimet, Lee Toner, Olivier Bonin-Ducharme	Northern Credit Union CC, Sudbury	John Epping (Northern Credit Union)	North Bay
2025	John Epping, Jacob Horgan, Tanner Horgan, Ian McMillan	Northern Credit Union CC, Sudbury	Dylan Johnston (Fort William)	Thunder Bay
2024	Trevor Bonot, Mike McCarville, Jordan Potts, Kurtis Byrd	Fort William Curling Club	Tanner Horgan (Northern Credit Union)	Little Current
2023	Tanner Horgan, Darren Moulding, Jacob Horgan, Colin Hodgson	Northern Credit Union Community Centre	Sandy MacEwan (Sudbury)	Kenora
2022	Brad Jacobs, E. J. Harnden, Jordan Chandler, Ryan Harnden	Community First Curling Centre	Sandy MacEwan (Sudbury)	Sault Ste. Marie
2021	Cancelled due to the COVID-19 pandemic in Ontario (Note: Team Jacobs was appointed to be Northern Ontario's representative at the 2021 Tim Hortons Brer)			
2020	Brad Jacobs, Marc Kennedy, E. J. Harnden, Ryan Harnden	Community First Curling Centre	Mike Badiuk (Geraldton)	New Liskeard
2019	Brad Jacobs, Ryan Fry, E. J. Harnden, Ryan Harnden	Community First Curling Centre	Tanner Horgan (Sudbury)	Nipigon
2018	Brad Jacobs, Ryan Fry, E. J. Harnden, Ryan Harnden	Community First Curling Centre	Tanner Horgan (Copper Cliff)	Little Current
2017	Brad Jacobs, Ryan Fry, E. J. Harnden, Ryan Harnden	Community First Curling Centre	Dylan Johnston (Fort William)	Thunder Bay
2016	Brad Jacobs, Ryan Fry, E. J. Harnden, Ryan Harnden	Community First Curling Centre	Jordan Chandler (Sudbury)	North Bay
2015	Brad Jacobs, Ryan Fry, E. J. Harnden, Ryan Harnden	Soo Curlers Association	Al Hackner (Fort William)	Kenora
2014	Jeff Currie, Mike McCarville, Colin Koivula, Jamie Childs	Fort William Curling Club	Brian Adams Jr. (Port Arthur)	Schumacher
2013	Brad Jacobs, Ryan Fry, E. J. Harnden, Ryan Harnden	Soo Curlers Association	Rob Gordon (Sudbury)	Nipigon
2012	Brad Jacobs, E. J. Harnden, Ryan Harnden, Scott Seabrook	Soo Curlers Association	Mike Jakubo (Copper Cliff)	Sault Ste. Marie
2011	Brad Jacobs, E. J. Harnden, Ryan Harnden, Scott Seabrook	Soo Curlers Association	Joe Scharf (Fort William)	Thunder Bay
2010	Brad Jacobs, E. J. Harnden, Ryan Harnden, Caleb Flaxey	Soo Curlers Association	Matt Dumontelle (Sudbury)	Sudbury
2009	Mike Jakubo, Matt Seabrook, Luc Ouimet, Lee Toner	Copper Cliff Curling Club	Brad Jacobs (Soo)	Fort Frances
2008	Eric Harnden, E. J. Harnden, Ryan Harnden, Caleb Flaxey	Soo Curlers Association	Jeff Currie (Thunder Bay)	Englehart
2007	Brad Jacobs, Al Harnden (skip), Dusty Jakomait, Rob Thomas	Soo Curlers Association	Tim Phillips	Sudbury
2006	Rob Gordon, David MacInnes, Steve Burnett, Jeremy Landry	Cobalt-Haileybury Curling Club	Joe Scharf	Nipigon
2005	Mike Jakubo, Jon Solberg, Luc Ouimet, Lee Toner	Copper Cliff Curling Club	Tim Phillips (Sudbury)	Haileybury
2004	Rob Gordon, Brian Fawcett, Steve Burnett, Jeremy Landry	Cobalt-Haileybury Curling Club	Jeff Currie (Thunder Bay)	Sault Ste. Marie
2003	Scott Henderson, Art Lappalainen, Mike Desilets, Tim Lindsay	Fort William Curling Club	Scott Patterson (North Bay Granite)	Thunder Bay
2002	Tim Phillips, Ron Collins, Drew Eloranta, Doug Hong	Sudbury Curling Club	Ron Rosengren (Thunder Bay)	Kapuskasing
2001	Al Hackner, Bryan Burgess, Joe Scharf, Mike Assad	Fort William Curling Club	Bill Adams (Thunder Bay)	North Bay
2000	Tim Phillips, Roger Sauve, Ron Henderson, Dan Sauve	Idylwylde Golf and Country Club	Dave MacInnes (Timmins)	Marathon
1999	Scott Patterson, Phil Loevenmark, John McClelland, Wayne Lowe	North Bay Granite Club	Bill Adams (Thunder Bay)	Schumacher
1998	Bruce Melville, Rob Sinclair, Dale Wiersema, Larry Rathje	Port Arthur Curling Club	Al Hackner (Thunder Bay)	Espanola
1997	Mike Coulter, Chris Buchan, Dusty Jakomait, Mark Maki	Soo Curlers Association	Bill Adams (Thunder Bay)	Fort Frances
1996	David MacInnes, Jeffrey Henderson, Marc Butler, Will Gubbels	McIntyre Curling Club	Larry Pineau (Thunder Bay)	Kirkland Lake
1995	Al Hackner, Rick Lang, Aaron Skillen, Art Lappalainen	Fort William Curling Club	Rob Gordon (Cobalt-Haileybury)	Sudbury
1994	Scott Patterson, Phil Loevenmark, John McClelland, Wayne Lowe	Granite Curling Club (North Bay)	Mike Coulter (Sault Ste. Marie)	Thunder Bay
1993	Rick Lang, Scott Henderson, Ross Tetley, Art Lappalainen	Fort William Curling Club	Mike Coulter (Soo)	Haileybury
1992	Al Hackner, Larry Pineau, Brian Perozak, Brian Adams	Thunder Bay Country Club	Rollie Ralph (Soo)	Sault Ste. Marie
1991	Rick Lang, Scott Henderson, Ross Tetley, Art Lappalainen	Fort William Curling Club	Larry Pineau (Thunder Bay)	Kenora
1990	Al Harnden, Eric Harnden, Rich Evoy, Frank Caputo	Soo Curlers Association	Brian Apland (Kenora)	Schumacher
1989	Al Hackner, Bill Adams, Jim Adams, John Salo	Fort William Curling Club	Gord McKnight (New Liskeard)	North Bay
1988	Al Hackner, Rick Lang, Jim Adams, (Note: Adams was replaced by his brother Bill in the final.) Doug Smith, Bill Adams	Fort William Curling Club	Brian Apland (Kenora)	Thunder Bay
1987	Larry Pineau, Jack Kallos, Brian Snell, Bruce Kennedy	Fort William Curling Club	Peter Minogue (North Bay Granite)	Iroquois Falls

=== 1927–1986 ===
Year	Team	Winning club
1986	Al Harnden, Mike Coulter, Richard Evoy, Rick Elliott	Soo Curlers Association
1985	Al Hackner, Rick Lang, Ian Tetley, Pat Perroud	Fort William Curling Club
1984	Gord McKnight, Bill Johnston, Brian Carr, Reg Gardner	Horne Granite Curling Club
1983	John MacFarlane, Al Harnden, Eric Harnden, Rich Evoy	Tarentorus Curling Club
1982	Al Hackner, Rick Lang, Bob Nicol, Bruce Kennedy	Fort William Curling Club
1981	Al Hackner, Rick Lang, Bob Nichol, Bruce Kennedy	Fort William Curling Club
1980	Al Hackner, Rick Lang, Bob Nichol, Bruce Kennedy	Fort William Curling Club
1979	Larry Pineau, Scott Hamilton, George Campbell, Cliff Campbell	Thunder Bay Winter Club
1978	Barry Mutrie, John Ballantyne, John K. Ross, Ted Bowcock	Kapuskasing Curling Club
1977	John Tate, Bob Miller, Wayne Leavoy, George Medakovic	Idylwylde Golf and Country Club
1976	Rick Lang, Bob Nicol, Al Fiskar, Jr., Warren Butters	Fort William Curling Club
1975	Bill Tetley, Rick Lang, Bill Hodgson, Jr., Peter Hnatiw	Fort William Curling Club
1974	John R. Ross, Frank Bell, Bob Tate, John Tate	Idylwylde Golf and Country Club
1973	Don Harry, Morley Harry, Peter Wong, Art Mousseau	Sudbury Curling Club
1972	Jack McFarlane, Mike Boyd, Rae Clattenburg, Dave McFarlane	Tarentorus Curling Club
1971	Bill Tetley, Frank Sargent, Jr., Jim Sargent, Eric Knudsen	Thunder Bay Curling Club
1970	Tom Tod, Jim Carson, J. Carl Whitfield, Bill Hallinan	Fort William Curling Club
1969	Terry Johnson, Jack Thompson, Grant Green, Gordon Peterson	Kenora Curling Club
1968	Herbert Pile, Len Tremblay, Ross Davis, D. Wayne Downey	Geraldton Curling Club
1967	Bill Grozelle, Bob Grozelle, John Dunn, George McIllwaine	Cobalt-Haileybury Curling Club
1966	Bill Grozelle, Bob Grozelle, Ted Butt, George McIllwaine	Cobalt-Haileybury Curling Club
1965	John Polyblank, Frank Buturac, Earl MacInnes, E. Wayne Petch	Kirkland Lake Curling Club
1964	John Polyblank, Frank Mcdonald, Earl MacInnes, E. Wayne Petch	Kirkland Lake Curling Club
1963	Doug Gathercole, Lawrence Sauve, Bernard LeClair, Arthur Dubery	Copper Cliff Curling Club
1962	Ron Redding, John Kostick, Al Hansen, Gord Peterson	Kenora Curling Club
1961	John Polyblank, Frank Mcdonald, Earl MacInnes, Murv Smith	Kirkland Lake Curling Club
1960	Don Groom, Art Silver, Bill Groom, Al Armstrong	Granite Curling Club (Sudbury)
1959	Darwin Wark, Dennis Stephen, Leslie Sutton, John Jones	Fort William Curling Club
1958	Ron Redding, John Kostick, Bill Sawkins, Al Hansen	Kenora Curling Club
1957	Don McEwen, Jim Simpson, Don Smeaton, Bill Tetley	Port Arthur Curling Club
1956	Steve Kuzmaski, Bill Hudgins, Al Rodin, George Burns	Copper Cliff Curling Club
1955	Rudy Steski, Bob Wyatt, Owen Staples, Ed McCormick	Granite Curling Club (North Bay)
1954	Don Groom, Ray Cook, Bob McInnes, Tom Callaghan	Granite Curling Club (Sudbury)
1953	Grant Watson, Don McEwen, Frank Sargent, Archie Grant	Port Arthur Curling Club
1952	James Guy, Jack Pike, J. Leo Fregeau, Ray Parnell	Kenora Curling Club
1951	Walter Johnstone, Arnie Boyd, Wally Flowers, Bill MacKay	Copper Cliff Curling Club
1950	Tom Ramsay, Len Williamson, Bill Weston, Bill Kenney	Kirkland Lake Curling Club
1949	Jimmy Sutherland, Elmer Dick, Ken Vail, Hugh Calverley	Schumacher and McIntyre Curling Club
1948	James Guy, Bill Johnson, George Holmstrom, Jack McLeod	Kenora Curling Club
1947	Don Best, Tom Marston, Len Williamson, Harry McNabb	Kirkland Lake Curling Club
1946	Tom Ramsay, Wally Spencer, M. Gray Coughlin, Hugh Colquhoun	Kirkland Lake Curling Club
1943-1945 cancelled due to World War II
1942	Bill McMitchell, Bert Cooper, Jr., Don Groom, Bert Cooper, Sr.	Sudbury Curling Club
1941	Don Best, J. C. Tuck, Tom Rushworth, George Sayles	Kirkland Lake Curling Club
1940	James Davis, Ab Sackrider, Harry McNabb, Scotty MacDonald	Kirkland Lake Curling Club
1939	Dan Millar, Dunc Sutherland, Bill Beecroft, Lorne Umprhrey	Haileybury Curling Club
1938	John Walker, Sam Caldbick, Bob Donald, Jack Gauthier	Timmins Curling Club
1937	Emmett Smith, Dan Millar, Bill Beecroft, Melvin Robb	Haileybury Curling Club
1936	Emmett Smith, Dan Millar, Bill Beecroft, Melvin Robb	Haileybury Curling Club
1935	James Shaw, Herb Lash, Bill Rubenstein, Frank Elliott	Sault Ste. Marie Curling Club
1934	James Shaw, Herb Lash, Noble Kenny, Frank Elliott	Sault Ste. Marie Curling Club
1933	Jerry Abrams, Mel Charron, Tom Ramsay, Bert Elliott	Kirkland Lake Curling Club
1932	A. E. Stephenson, R. W. Thomson, Charles Binkley, Jack McKinlay	New Liskeard Curling Club
1931	John Nicholson, James Shaw, George Murr, Lloyd Mason	Sault Ste. Marie Curling Club
1930	Albert Tobey, Frank Muirhead, Bob Morrison, David Moore	Sudbury Curling Club
1929	George Nicholson, Thomas Godfrey, Frank Hamlin, William Thompson	Chapleau Curling Club
1928	Albert Tobey, Frank Muirhead, Bob Morrison, Jim Scott	Sudbury Curling Club
1927	Emmett Smith, Dunc Sutherland, Dan Millar, Mel Hunt	Haileybury Curling Club
