= 2026 Northern Ontario Men's Provincial Curling Championship =

Canadian provincial men's curling championship

- Host city: North Bay, Ontario
- Arena: North Bay Granite Club
- Dates: January 6–11
- Winner: Team MacEwan
- Curling club: Northern Credit Union CC, Sudbury
- Skip: Sandy MacEwan
- Third: Dustin Montpellier
- Second: Luc Ouimet
- Lead: Lee Toner
- Alternate: Olivier Bonin-Ducharme
- Finalist: John Epping

The 2026 Northern Ontario Men's Provincial Curling Championship, the men's provincial curling championship for Northern Ontario, was held from January 6 to 11 at the North Bay Granite Club in North Bay, Ontario. The winning Sandy MacEwan rink represented Northern Ontario at the 2026 Montana's Brier, Canada's national men's curling championship in St. John's, Newfoundland and Labrador where they missed the playoffs finishing 2–6 in Pool B. The event was held in conjunction with the 2026 Northern Ontario Women's Curling Championship, the provincial women's championship.

== Teams ==
The teams are listed as follows:

Skip	Third	Second	Lead	Alternate	Coach	Club
Brian Adams Jr.	Colin Koivula	Mark Koivula	Joel Adams			Port Arthur CC, Thunder Bay
Mike Anderson	Ryan Sayer	Graehem Sayer	Tyler Smith			Horne GC, New Liskeard
Mike Assad	Zack Warkentin	Chris Gordon	Matthew Gordon	Jason Strelezski		Idylwylde G&CC, Sudbury
J.C. Beecroft	Al Johnson	Rob Clayton	Tyler Rooley			YNCU Curling Centre, Sault Ste. Marie
Trevor Bonot	Mike McCarville	Jordan Potts	Jamie Childs		Al Hackner	Fort William CC, Thunder Bay
Jeff Brown	Chris Bowman	Gavan Jamieson	Brad Griffith	Bobby Ray		North Bay GC, North Bay
Kurtis Byrd	Kris Leupen	Chris Silver	Justin McCarville			Fort William CC, Thunder Bay
Jordan Chandler	Kyle Chandler	Ron McQuarrie	Jim Bickell			Little Current CC, Little Current
John Epping	Jacob Horgan	Tanner Horgan	Ian McMillan		Jim Wilson	Northern Credit Union CC, Sudbury
Chris Glibota	Dan Mick	Jake Reid	Kyle Sherlock			YNCU Curling Centre, Sault Ste. Marie
Matthew Hunt	Nick Lemieux	Connor Simms	Gavin Bell			YNCU Curling Centre, Sault Ste. Marie
Dylan Johnston	Jordan Potter	Chris Briand	Brennan Wark			Fort William CC, Thunder Bay
Sandy MacEwan	Dustin Montpellier	Luc Ouimet	Lee Toner	Olivier Bonin-Ducharme		Northern Credit Union CC, Sudbury
Evan Robert (Note: Team name is listed as Sault College.)	Ben Appleton	Justin MacKay	Jake Clouthier		Dan Lemieux	YNCU Curling Centre, Sault Ste. Marie
Tyler Stewart	Jackson Dubinsky	Travis Potter	Brayden Sinclair			Kakabeka Falls CC, Kakabeka Falls
Riley Winters	Wesley Decary	Grayson Gribbon	Aidan Baxter		Steve Decary	North Bay GC, North Bay

=== Map of teams ===
Northern Ontario Men's Curling Championship Teams

== Knockout Brackets ==
=== A Event ===
First Knockout	Qualifier 1
John Epping	11
J.C. Beecroft	1
John Epping	7
Kurtis Byrd	2
Mike Assad	3
Kurtis Byrd	9
John Epping	8
Brian Adams Jr.	2
Brian Adams Jr.	7
Jeff Brown	6
Brian Adams Jr.	9
Matthew Hunt	4
Dylan Johnston	5
Matthew Hunt	6
John Epping	9
Trevor Bonot	4
Team MacEwan	7
Sault College	4
Team MacEwan	8
Chris Glibota	6
Jordan Chandler	6
Chris Glibota	7
Team MacEwan	4
Trevor Bonot	7
Tyler Stewart	9
Mike Anderson	6
Tyler Stewart	2
Trevor Bonot	9
Trevor Bonot	7
Riley Winters	4

=== B Event ===
Second Knockout	Qualifier 2
Tyler Stewart	6
Brian Adams Jr.	7
J.C. Beecroft	0	Mike Assad	5
Tyler Stewart	5	Dylan Johnston	4
Mike Assad	12
Dylan Johnston	7
Chris Glibota	6
Jeff Brown	5	Dylan Johnston	9
Dylan Johnston	7
Trevor Bonot	8
Brian Adams Jr.	8	Brian Adams Jr.	1
Team MacEwan	7
Matthew Hunt	7
Team MacEwan	6
Sault College	6	Jordan Chandler	9
Jordan Chandler	7	Riley Winters	5
Jordan Chandler	8
Riley Winters	9
Kurtis Byrd	4
Mike Anderson	7	Riley Winters	6
Riley Winters	8

=== C Event ===
Third Knockout	Qualifier 3
J.C. Beecroft	2	Riley Winters	7
Kurtis Byrd	9	Tyler Stewart	6	Tyler Stewart	8
Kurtis Byrd	3	Jeff Brown	5	Brian Adams Jr.	5
Jeff Brown	7	Team MacEwan	5	Team MacEwan	9
Jeff Brown	7	Tyler Stewart	8	Tyler Stewart	4
Matthew Hunt	6	Mike Anderson	2
Sault College	7	Dylan Johnston	8
Chris Glibota	8	Jordan Chandler	3	Mike Anderson	12
Chris Glibota	2	Mike Anderson	9
Mike Anderson	8
Mike Anderson	7
Mike Assad	4

== Knockout Results ==
All draws are listed in Eastern Time (UTC−05:00).

=== Draw 1 ===
Tuesday, January 6, 2:30 pm

Sheet B	1	2	3	4	5	6	7	8	9	10	Final
John Epping 🔨	1	3	2	0	5	X	X	X	X	X	11
J.C. Beecroft	0	0	0	1	0	X	X	X	X	X	1

Sheet C	1	2	3	4	5	6	7	8	9	10	Final
Mike Assad	0	0	0	1	0	1	1	0	X	X	3
Kurtis Byrd 🔨	1	3	1	0	3	0	0	1	X	X	9

Sheet D	1	2	3	4	5	6	7	8	9	10	Final
Brian Adams Jr. 🔨	0	2	1	0	1	0	0	1	0	2	7
Jeff Brown	0	0	0	2	0	0	1	0	3	0	6

Sheet E	1	2	3	4	5	6	7	8	9	10	Final
Dylan Johnston 🔨	0	0	0	1	2	0	1	1	0	0	5
Matthew Hunt	0	0	1	0	0	2	0	0	1	2	6

=== Draw 2 ===
Tuesday, January 6, 7:00 pm

Sheet C	1	2	3	4	5	6	7	8	9	10	Final
Team MacEwan	0	0	1	2	1	0	0	1	1	1	7
Sault College 🔨	0	2	0	0	0	0	2	0	0	0	4

Sheet D	1	2	3	4	5	6	7	8	9	10	Final
Jordan Chandler 🔨	1	0	2	1	0	0	1	0	1	0	6
Chris Glibota	0	1	0	0	2	2	0	2	0	0	7

Sheet E	1	2	3	4	5	6	7	8	9	10	Final
Tyler Stewart 🔨	0	3	0	2	0	1	0	1	0	2	9
Mike Anderson	0	0	2	0	2	0	1	0	1	0	6

Sheet F	1	2	3	4	5	6	7	8	9	10	Final
Trevor Bonot 🔨	2	0	0	2	1	0	0	0	2	X	7
Riley Winters	0	0	2	0	0	0	2	0	0	X	4

=== Draw 3 ===
Wednesday, January 7, 8:30 am

Sheet B	1	2	3	4	5	6	7	8	9	10	Final
Mike Anderson	0	3	0	2	1	0	0	1	0	0	7
Riley Winters 🔨	0	0	3	0	0	2	1	0	1	1	8

Sheet C	1	2	3	4	5	6	7	8	9	10	Final
Jeff Brown	0	1	1	0	2	1	0	0	0	0	5
Dylan Johnston 🔨	3	0	0	1	0	0	0	1	1	1	7

Sheet E	1	2	3	4	5	6	7	8	9	10	Final
J.C. Beecroft	0	0	0	0	0	0	X	X	X	X	0
Mike Assad 🔨	0	3	2	3	1	3	X	X	X	X	12

Sheet F	1	2	3	4	5	6	7	8	9	10	Final
Sault College 🔨	2	1	0	0	1	1	0	1	0	0	6
Jordan Chandler	0	0	1	1	0	0	3	0	1	2	8

=== Draw 4 ===
Wednesday, January 7, 1:00 pm

Sheet B	1	2	3	4	5	6	7	8	9	10	Final
Tyler Stewart	0	1	0	0	0	0	1	0	X	X	2
Trevor Bonot 🔨	2	0	0	2	1	1	0	3	X	X	9

Sheet C	1	2	3	4	5	6	7	8	9	10	Final
Brian Adams Jr. 🔨	0	2	0	0	3	0	1	3	X	X	9
Matthew Hunt	0	0	1	2	0	1	0	0	X	X	4

Sheet D	1	2	3	4	5	6	7	8	9	10	Final
John Epping 🔨	2	0	0	2	0	2	1	X	X	X	7
Kurtis Byrd	0	1	0	0	1	0	0	X	X	X	2

Sheet F	1	2	3	4	5	6	7	8	9	10	Final
Team MacEwan	0	1	0	2	1	0	0	2	0	2	8
Chris Glibota 🔨	2	0	1	0	0	2	0	0	1	0	6

=== Draw 5 ===
Wednesday, January 7, 8:30 pm

Sheet B	1	2	3	4	5	6	7	8	9	10	Final
Chris Glibota	0	0	1	1	0	2	0	2	0	X	6
Dylan Johnston 🔨	0	2	0	0	2	0	4	0	1	X	9

Sheet D	1	2	3	4	5	6	7	8	9	10	Final
Tyler Stewart 🔨	0	1	0	0	0	2	0	1	1	1	6
Mike Assad	0	0	1	2	1	0	1	0	0	0	5

=== Draw 6 ===
Thursday, January 8, 8:30 am

Sheet B	1	2	3	4	5	6	7	8	9	10	Final
Matthew Hunt 🔨	0	0	2	2	0	1	1	0	1	0	7
Jordan Chandler	1	2	0	0	3	0	0	1	0	2	9

Sheet C	1	2	3	4	5	6	7	8	9	10	Final
Kurtis Byrd 🔨	0	0	1	1	0	0	1	0	0	1	4
Riley Winters	2	1	0	0	1	1	0	0	1	0	6

Sheet D	1	2	3	4	5	6	7	8	9	10	11	Final
Sault College	1	0	2	0	0	1	0	2	1	0	0	7
Chris Glibota 🔨	0	1	0	1	1	0	1	0	0	3	1	8

Sheet F	1	2	3	4	5	6	7	8	9	10	Final
Mike Anderson 🔨	0	0	0	2	0	1	0	4	0	X	7
Mike Assad	0	1	0	0	1	0	1	0	1	X	4

=== Draw 7 ===
Thursday, January 8, 1:00 pm

Sheet C	1	2	3	4	5	6	7	8	9	10	Final
J.C. Beecroft	0	0	0	0	2	0	0	X	X	X	2
Kurtis Byrd 🔨	0	1	1	3	0	0	4	X	X	X	9

Sheet E	1	2	3	4	5	6	7	8	9	10	Final
Tyler Stewart 🔨	0	0	2	0	2	0	0	0	0	1	5
Dylan Johnston	0	1	0	1	0	3	0	1	1	0	7

Sheet F	1	2	3	4	5	6	7	8	9	10	Final
Jeff Brown	0	2	0	0	1	0	2	2	0	0	7
Matthew Hunt 🔨	1	0	1	0	0	1	0	0	2	1	6

=== Draw 8 ===
Thursday, January 8, 5:30 pm

Sheet E	1	2	3	4	5	6	7	8	9	10	Final
Team MacEwan	0	0	0	0	1	0	2	0	1	0	4
Trevor Bonot 🔨	0	2	0	1	0	1	0	2	0	1	7

Sheet F	1	2	3	4	5	6	7	8	9	10	Final
John Epping	0	0	2	1	1	0	3	1	X	X	8
Brian Adams Jr. 🔨	1	0	0	0	0	1	0	0	X	X	2

=== Draw 9 ===
Friday, January 9, 10:00 am

Sheet B	1	2	3	4	5	6	7	8	9	10	Final
Kurtis Byrd 🔨	0	0	1	0	1	0	0	1	0	X	3
Jeff Brown	0	0	0	2	0	2	1	0	2	X	7

Sheet C	1	2	3	4	5	6	7	8	9	10	Final
Chris Glibota 🔨	0	1	0	0	1	0	0	X	X	X	2
Mike Anderson	0	0	1	2	0	3	2	X	X	X	8

Sheet F	1	2	3	4	5	6	7	8	9	10	Final
Jordan Chandler	0	3	0	0	0	2	0	2	0	0	7
Riley Winters 🔨	1	0	2	1	1	0	2	0	0	2	9

=== Draw 10 ===
Friday, January 9, 2:30 pm

Sheet B	1	2	3	4	5	6	7	8	9	10	Final
Brian Adams Jr. 🔨	0	1	0	3	0	0	2	0	1	X	7
Dylan Johnston	0	0	1	0	2	0	0	1	0	X	4

Sheet D	1	2	3	4	5	6	7	8	9	10	Final
Team MacEwan 🔨	2	0	0	2	0	1	0	1	0	X	6
Riley Winters	0	1	1	0	1	0	1	0	1	X	5

Sheet E	1	2	3	4	5	6	7	8	9	10	Final
Mike Anderson 🔨	2	0	1	3	0	3	X	X	X	X	9
Jordan Chandler	0	1	0	0	2	0	X	X	X	X	3

Sheet F	1	2	3	4	5	6	7	8	9	10	Final
Jeff Brown 🔨	0	0	0	1	0	2	2	0	0	0	5
Tyler Stewart	0	1	0	0	1	0	0	1	1	2	6

=== Draw 11 ===
Friday, January 9, 7:30 pm

Sheet C	1	2	3	4	5	6	7	8	9	10	Final
John Epping 🔨	0	3	0	2	0	2	0	2	X	X	9
Trevor Bonot	0	0	1	0	1	0	2	0	X	X	4

Sheet E	1	2	3	4	5	6	7	8	9	10	Final
Brian Adams Jr. 🔨	2	0	2	1	0	0	0	1	0	2	8
Team MacEwan	0	2	0	0	1	1	1	0	2	0	7

=== Draw 12 ===
Saturday, January 10, 10:00 am

Sheet B	1	2	3	4	5	6	7	8	9	10	Final
Riley Winters	0	2	0	0	1	0	1	0	3	0	7
Tyler Stewart 🔨	0	0	2	3	0	1	0	1	0	1	8

Sheet D	1	2	3	4	5	6	7	8	9	10	Final
Dylan Johnston	0	2	1	0	0	2	0	3	0	0	8
Mike Anderson 🔨	2	0	0	2	1	0	2	0	2	3	12

=== Draw 13 ===
Saturday, January 10, 2:30 pm

Sheet D	1	2	3	4	5	6	7	8	9	10	Final
Trevor Bonot 🔨	1	2	1	2	0	2	X	X	X	X	8
Brian Adams Jr.	0	0	0	0	1	0	X	X	X	X	1

Sheet F	1	2	3	4	5	6	7	8	9	10	Final
Tyler Stewart 🔨	0	1	3	0	1	0	2	1	X	X	8
Mike Anderson	0	0	0	1	0	1	0	0	X	X	2

=== Draw 14 ===
Saturday, January 10, 7:00 pm

Sheet C	1	2	3	4	5	6	7	8	9	10	Final
Team MacEwan	0	1	0	1	0	0	2	0	1	0	5
Tyler Stewart 🔨	0	0	1	0	0	1	0	1	0	1	4

=== Draw 15 ===
Sunday, January 11, 9:00 am

Sheet E	1	2	3	4	5	6	7	8	9	10	Final
Brian Adams Jr. 🔨	1	0	0	2	0	1	0	1	0	X	5
Team MacEwan	0	2	1	0	2	0	2	0	2	X	9

== Playoffs ==
Semifinal			Final
			A	John Epping	5
B	Trevor Bonot	8	C	Team MacEwan	6
C	Team MacEwan	9

=== Semifinal ===
Sunday, January 11, 1:30 pm

Sheet C	1	2	3	4	5	6	7	8	9	10	11	Final
Trevor Bonot 🔨	1	0	1	0	1	0	3	0	0	2	0	8
Team MacEwan	0	2	0	2	0	2	0	1	1	0	1	9

=== Final ===
Sunday, January 11, 6:00 pm

Sheet D	1	2	3	4	5	6	7	8	9	10	Final
John Epping 🔨	0	2	0	1	0	0	0	0	2	0	5
Team MacEwan	2	0	1	0	0	0	1	0	0	2	6

2026 Northern Ontario Men's Provincial Curling Championship

Sandy MacEwan
1st Northern Ontario Provincial Championship title
