= The Dominion 2010 Northern Ontario Men's Curling Championship =

- Host city: Sudbury, Ontario
- Arena: Sudbury Curling Club
- Dates: February 8–14
- Winner: Team Jacobs
- Curling club: Community First CC, Sault Ste. Marie
- Skip: Brad Jacobs
- Third: E. J. Harnden
- Second: Ryan Harnden
- Lead: Caleb Flaxey
- Finalist: Matt Dumontelle

The 2010 Dominion Northern Ontario Men's Curling Championship, was held February 8–14, 2010 in Sudbury, at the Sudbury Curling Club. The winner would represent Northern Ontario at the 2010 Tim Hortons Brier.

== Teams ==
Skip	Third	Second	Lead	Alternate	Club
Mike Assad	Justin Whitehurst	Dylan Johnston	Jamie Childs	Cody Johnston	Thunder Bay; Fort William Curling Club
Rob Brewer	Al Belec	Scott Seabrook	Greg McLellan	Jamie Broad	Sault Ste. Marie; Soo Curlers Association
Bryan Burgess	Gary Weiss	Dale Wiersema	Pat Berezowski		Thunder Bay; Port Arthur Curling Club
Matt Dumontelle	Ron Henderson	Dion Dumontelle	Doug Hong		Sudbury; Sudbury Curling Club
Robbie Gordon	Dave MacInnes	Jeremy Landry	Steve Burnett		Temiskaming Shores; Cobalt-Haileybury Curling Club
Brad Jacobs	E.J. Harnden	Ryan Harnden	Caleb Flaxey		Sault Ste. Marie; Soo Curlers Association
Art Lappalainen	Ron Rosengren	Rob Sinclair	Gary Maunula		Thunder Bay; Port Arthur Curling Club
Tim Nordin	Mitch Seguin	Mike Badiuk	Travis Showalter		Morley; Stratton Curling Club
Tim Phillips	Sandy MacEwan	Jamie Morphet	Stephen Chenier		Sudbury; Sudbury Curling Club
Mike Pozihun	Deron Surkan	Andy Peloza	Aaron Rogalski		Thunder Bay; Port Arthur Curling Club
John Salo	Cory Nephin	Jamie Armstrong	Kurt Pristanski		Geraldton; Geraldton Curling Club
Joe Scharf	Mike McCarville	Rob Champagne	Gary Champagne		Thunder Bay; Port Arthur Curling Club

== Standings ==
#	Skip	W	L
1	Jacobs	10	1
2	Dumontelle	8	3
3	Scharf	7	4
4	Assad	6	5
5	Burgess	6	5
6	Salo	6	5
7	Lappalainen	6	5
8	Phillips	5	6
9	Pozihun	4	7
10	Belec	3	8
11	Gordon	3	8
12	Nordin	2	9

== Scores ==
=== February 8 ===
- Salo 9-5 Phillips
- Scharf 8-2 Belec
- Assad 7-6 Pozihun
- Gordon 7-6 Lappalainen
- Pozihun 6-5 Burgess
- Jacobs 7-5 Gordon
- Phillips 8-7 Nordin
- Dumontelle 8-4 Belec
- Jacobs 9-5 Lappalainen
- Burgess 7-6 Assad
- Dumontelle 8-6 Scharf
- Salo 8-4 Nordin

=== February 9 ===
- Gordon 9-8 Dumontelle
- Pozihun 7-4 Nordin
- Jacobs 11-4 Belec
- Burgess 5-2 Phillips
- Assad 8-1 Belec
- Phillips 9-6 Lappalainen
- Gordon 7-6 Salo
- Scharf 7-6 Pozihun
- Scharf 8-5 Nordin
- Dumontelle 10-9 Salo
- Burgess 7-1 Lappalainen
- Jacobs 8-6 Assad

=== February 10 ===
- Salo 6-5 Burgess
- Nordin 8-2 Assad
- Jacobs 9-2 Scharf
- Lappalainen 8-4 Dumontelle
- Phillips 7-6 Jacobs
- Burgess 6-4 Belec
- Dumontelle 13-9 Pozihun
- Nordin 6-5 Gordon
- Lappalainen 6-5 Pozihun
- Assad 9-3 Gordon
- Scharf 9-7 Phillips
- Salo 7-4 Belec

=== February 11 ===
- Scharf 7-2 Gordon
- Salo 8-3 Pozihun
- Lappalainen 9-3 Belec
- Assad 11-8 Phillips
- Dumontelle 9-3 Assad
- Lappalainen 9-7 Nordin
- Jacobs 9-3 Salo
- Scharf 8-7 Burgess
- Belec 9-6 Nordin
- Dumontelle 10-7 Phillips
- Burgess 10-9 Gordon
- Jacobs 7-4 Pozihun

=== February 12 ===
- Dumontelle 5-4 Burgess
- Lappalainen 8-5 Scharf
- Assad 11-10 Salo
- Jacobs 5-4 Nordin
- Pozihun 8-3 Gordon
- Jacobs 8-7 Burgess
- Dumontelle 8-5 Nordin
- Phillips 7-4 Belec
- Salo 8-4 Lappalainen
- Phillips 8-7 Gordon
- Belec 12-5 Pozihun
- Assad 7-4 Scharf

=== February 13 ===
- Jacobs 8-6 Dumontelle
- Burgess 8-2 Nordin
- Pozihun 8-7 Phillips
- Scharf 10-4 Salo
- Lappalainen 10-5 Assad
- Belec 9-2 Gordon

== Tie breakers ==
- Assad 6-5 Salo
- Burgess 6-5 Lappalainen
- Assad 10-6 Burgess

== Play-off ==
Semifinals
1	Jacobs	8
2	Dumontelle	9
3	Scharf	9
4	Assad	6

Preliminary final
1	Jacobs	5
3	Scharf	4

Final
2	Dumontelle	2
1	Jacobs	5
