= Adam Kingsbury =

Canadian curling coach (born 1983)

- Curler
- Born: Adam Kingsbury; July 20, 1983 (age 43); Edmonton, Alberta, Canada

Team
- Skip: Matt Dunstone
- Third: Colton Lott
- Second: E. J. Harnden
- Lead: Ryan Harnden
- Alternate: Adam Kingsbury

Curling career
- Member Association: Manitoba (2025)
- Brier: 1 (2025)
Medal record
Men's curling
Representing Manitoba
The Brier
Silver medal – second place	2025 Kelowna

Adam Kingsbury (born July 20, 1983) is a Canadian sports mental performance consultant from Ottawa. He was the coach of the Rachel Homan curling rink which represented Canada at the 2018 Winter Olympics.

== Career ==
Kingsbury's background is not in competitive curling, though he has curled since high school, and has played in leagues at the Manotick and Ottawa Curling Clubs. He was a competitive golfer in university, where he became interested in sporting performance under pressure, conducting academic research in the sport. Kingsbury played in the Canadian University/College golf championships in 2004, where he missed a putt by six inches from just 2 ½ feet from the cup. The nerves he felt at this moment sparked his interest in sport psychology.

He joined the Rachel Homan rink in 2015 to help with their mental preparation while he was a PhD candidate in clinical psychology at the University of Ottawa. He began to be associated with the team after his business partner introduced him to Curling Canada's high-performance director Gerry Peckham. He became their head coach in 2016 after their previous coach, Marcel Rocque took a position with the Chinese national program. As coach, he was charged with improving the team's mental strength, and data collection. With Kingsbury, the team won the 2017 Scotties Tournament of Hearts, the 2017 World Women's Curling Championship, and the 2017 Canadian Olympic Curling Trials. The latter earned the team a spot at the 2018 Winter Olympics, where they finished sixth. He left the team in 2018.

After leaving the Homan team, Kingsbury expected to take some time off from curling. However, he was asked to join the Brad Jacobs rink as their coach for the 2018–19 season to help the team with the "psychological ... and mental aspect of the game". He coached the team at the 2019 Tim Hortons Brier where they won a bronze medal.

After a season with Jacobs, Kingsbury joined the Matt Dunstone rink as their coach for the 2019–20 season. Team Dunstone won a silver medal at the 2023 Brier and bronze medals at the 2020 and 2021 Briers with Kingsbury as coach. At the 2025 Brier, Kingsbury was the team's alternate player. As their alternate, Kingsbury threw two rocks, scoring a 100 per cent on both of them. At the Brier, the team went on to win silver, losing in the final to the Brad Jacobs Alberta team.

== Personal life ==
Kingsbury is married and has a son. In addition to his coaching work in curling, he has also served as a coaching consultant for Canada's national sledge hockey program in 2016–17, and was a member of Golf Canada's development squad for 2015–16. He received a bachelor's and master's degree in psychology from Carleton University and a PhD from the University of Ottawa in 2020.
