= Matt Dumontelle =

Canadian curler

- Curler ♂
- Born: November 28, 1984 (age 41)

Team
- Curling club: Soo CA, Sault Ste. Marie, ON, North Bay Granite Club, North Bay, ON

Curling career
- Member Association: Northern Ontario
- Brier: 2: (2011, 2013)
- World Championship: 1 (2013)
Medal record
Curling
Representing Canada
World Championships
Disqualified	2013 Victoria
Representing Northern Ontario
Tim Hortons Brier
Gold medal – first place	2013 Edmonton

Matt Dumontelle (born November 28, 1984) is a Canadian curler.

He is a 2013 Tim Hortons Brier champion.

When his team with skip Brad Jacobs won silver medals on 2013 World Men's Curling Championship, Matt Dumontelle was tested positive for the banned substance methandienone, an anabolic steroid, in a test following the world gold-medal game and he was disqualified on 2 years, this sanction ended on May 6, 2015. Until then he was ineligible to participate in any sport that is part of the Canadian Anti-Doping Program.

== Teams ==
Season	Skip	Third	Second	Lead	Alternate	Coach	Events
2004	Jamie Morphet	Matt Dumontelle	Paul Arkilander	Ryan Lafraniere	Miles Craig	Alan Arkilander	CJCC 2004 (5th)
2008–09	Tim Phillips	Matt Dumontelle	Ron Henderson	Dion Dumontelle			
2009	Matt Dumontelle	Brad Minogue	Dion Dumontelle	Ron Henderson			
2009–10	Matt Dumontelle	Ron Henderson	Dion Dumontelle	Doug Hong			
2010–11	Matt Dumontelle	Ron Henderson	Dion Dumontelle	Doug Hong			
2010–11	Brad Jacobs	E. J. Harnden	Ryan Harnden	Scott Seabrook	Matt Dumontelle	Tom Coulterman	Brier 2011
2011–12	Matt Dumontelle	Jordan Chandler	Kyle Chandler	Gavan Jamieson			
2012–13	Craig Kochan	Matt Dumontelle	?	John McClelland			
2012–13	Brad Jacobs	Ryan Fry	E. J. Harnden	Ryan Harnden	Matt Dumontelle	Tom Coulterman	Brier 2013 (gold); WCC 2013 (silver); DSQ
2015–16	Matt Dumontelle (fourth)	Jordan Chandler (skip)	Sandy MacEwan	Lee Toner			
2016–17	Matt Dumontelle (fourth)	Jordan Chandler (skip)	Sandy MacEwan	Lee Toner			
2017–18	Matt Dumontelle	Jeff Brown	Gavan Jamieson	Bobby Ray			
