= Tanner Horgan =

Canadian curler (born 1998)

- Curler
- Born: February 12, 1998 (age 28); Sudbury, Ontario, Canada

Team
- Curling club: Northern Credit Union CC, Sudbury
- Skip: Brendan Bottcher
- Third: Jacob Horgan
- Second: Tanner Horgan
- Lead: Geoff Walker
- Mixed doubles partner: Keira McLaughlin

Curling career
- Member Association: Northern Ontario (2009–2019; 2022–2026); Manitoba (2019–2021); Ontario (2021–2022); Alberta (2026–present)
- Brier: 3 (2018, 2023, 2025)
- Top CTRS ranking: 3rd (2025–26)

Tanner Horgan (born February 12, 1998, in Sudbury, Ontario) is a Canadian curler. He currently plays second on Team Brendan Bottcher.

== Career ==
=== Juniors ===
As a bantam aged curler, Horgan won three Northern Ontario titles (2010, 2013 and 2015). In 2012, he won a provincial elementary school championship for all of Ontario, representing MacLeod Public School.

Horgan won his first Northern Ontario junior title in 2014, earning him and teammates Nicholas Servant, brother Jacob and Maxime Blais the right to represent the region at the 2014 Canadian Junior Curling Championships. There, he skipped the team to a 5–5 finish, missing the playoffs. The next year, Horgan again won the Northern Ontario title, this time with his brother Jacob at third and Connor Lawes playing second. At the 2015 Canadian Junior Curling Championships, Horgan again led Northern Ontario to a 5–5 record.

Horgan went undefeated at the 2016 Northern Ontario Junior Curling Championships, winning his third straight title. The team lineup was relatively unchanged with Nicholas Bissonnette added to the team in replace of Lawes. The team finally made the playoffs at that year's national juniors, after finishing the round robin in first place with a 9–1 record, earning them a bye to the final. However, Manitoba's Matt Dunstone rink proved to be the better team, defeating Northern Ontario 11–4 to claim the championship.

=== Men's ===
Horgan and his men's team of brother Jacob, Blais and lead Scott Foy qualified for the 2016 Northern Ontario men's curling championship, Horgan's first provincial. There, he led his team to a 3–4 record.

At the beginning of the 2024-25 curling season, Tanner and Jacob would announce that they would be joining the John Epping rink alongside Ian McMillan and curl out of Sudbury in Northern Ontario. In their first year together, the Epping rink would have a strong season, playing in the 2025 Masters grand slam event where they would go 2-2 in the round robin and lose to Korey Dropkin in a tiebreaker. Epping would also go undefeated at the 2025 Northern Ontario Men's Provincial Curling Championship to represent Northern Ontario to the 2025 Montana's Brier. At the Brier, the team would go 6-2 in the round robin, however fail to qualify for the playoffs due to their head-to-head loss to Reid Carruthers to finish 4th in their group.

== Personal life ==
Horgan is employed as an ice technician at Roy's Curling Ice Services. He is in a relationship with fellow curler Keira McLaughlin and lives in Mississauga. He attended Laurentian University. His sisters Tracy Fleury and Jennifer Wylie are also accomplished curlers. His brother Jacob is also an accomplished curler and curls with Tanner on Team Bottcher.

== Grand Slam record ==
Key
C	Champion
F	Lost in Final
SF	Lost in Semifinal
QF	Lost in Quarterfinals
R16	Lost in the round of 16
Q	Did not advance to playoffs
T2	Played in Tier 2 event
DNP	Did not participate in event
N/A	Not a Grand Slam event that season

Event	2016–17	2017–18	2018–19	2019–20	2020–21	2021–22	2022–23	2023–24	2024–25	2025–26	2026–27
Invitational	DNP	DNP	DNP	T2	N/A	N/A	Q	DNP	DNP	SF	QF
Masters	DNP	DNP	DNP	DNP	N/A	DNP	DNP	DNP	Q	QF	QF
National	Q	DNP	DNP	DNP	N/A	DNP	DNP	DNP	DNP	QF	Q
Open	DNP	DNP	DNP	DNP	N/A	N/A	Q	DNP	DNP	Q	
Players'	DNP	DNP	DNP	N/A	DNP	DNP	DNP	DNP	QF	DNP	
