= Jacob Horgan =

Canadian curler (born 2000)

- Curler
- Born: April 7, 2000 (age 26); Sudbury, Ontario, Canada

Team
- Curling club: Curl Sudbury, Sudbury, ON
- Skip: Brendan Bottcher
- Third: Jacob Horgan
- Second: Tanner Horgan
- Lead: Geoff Walker
- Mixed doubles partner: Kira Brunton

Curling career
- Member Association: Northern Ontario (2009–2021; 2022–2026); Ontario (2021–2022; 2026); Alberta (2026–present)
- Brier: 3 (2023, 2025, 2026)
- Top CTRS ranking: 3rd (2025–26)
Medal record
Curling
Representing Northern Ontario
Canadian Mixed Doubles Championship
Bronze medal – third place	2025 Summerside
Representing Manitoba
The Brier
Gold medal – first place	2026 St. John's

Jacob "Jake" Horgan (born April 7, 2000) is a Canadian curler, originally from Sudbury, Ontario. He currently plays third on Team Brendan Bottcher. He is a seven-time Northern Ontario junior champion.

== Career ==
=== Juniors ===
As a bantam-aged curler, Horgan won three Northern Ontario titles (2010, 2013, and 2015). In 2012, he won the Ontario provincial elementary school championship, representing MacLeod Public School. Playing for his brother Tanner, Horgan won six straight Northern Ontario Junior Men's Championships from 2014 to 2019. They proved to be a strong team on the national stage as they won silver medals in 2016 and 2018 and a bronze medal in 2017. Jacob won his first junior provincial title as a skip in 2020 and skipped his team to a 3–6 record at the 2020 Canadian Junior Curling Championships.

=== Men's ===
In 2016, Team Horgan competed in their first Grand Slam of Curling event at the 2016 Boost National as the sponsor's exemption. They finished with a 1–3 record, defeating Steve Laycock in their final round robin match. They qualified for their first Brier in 2023, finishing tied for 5th place with a 6–2 record, losing to Brendan Bottcher in a qualifying game for the playoffs.

At the beginning of the 2024-25 curling season, Jacob and brother Tanner would announce that they would be joining the John Epping rink alongside Ian McMillan and curl out of Sudbury in Northern Ontario. In their first year together, the Epping rink would have a strong season, playing in the 2025 Masters grand slam event where they would go 2-2 in the round robin and lose to Korey Dropkin in a tiebreaker. Epping would also go undefeated at the 2025 Northern Ontario Men's Provincial Curling Championship to represent Northern Ontario to the 2025 Montana's Brier. At the Brier, the team would go 6-2 in the round robin, however fail to qualify for the playoffs due to their head-to-head loss to Reid Carruthers to finish 4th in their group. The following year Team Epping would go undefeated at the 2026 Northern Ontario Men's Provincial Curling Championship, until losing in the final 6–5 to Sandy MacEwan, failing to qualify for the 2026 Montana's Brier. However, Horgan would still have the opportunity to compete at the 2026 Brier as the alternate for the Matt Dunstone rink out of Manitoba, and Team Dunstone would go on to win the national championship, beating Kevin Koe 6–3 in the final. This victory earned Horgan his first Brier title.

=== Mixed doubles ===
Horgan joined forces with Kira Brunton to compete in mixed doubles in the 2024–25 season, competing in the 2025 Canadian Mixed Doubles Curling Championship. In their first national championship together, the duo had success, finishing round robin play with an undefeated 7–0 record, and losing to eventual champions Kadriana Lott and Colton Lott 6–5 in the semifinals.

Horgan and Brunton won continue their success the following year, winning the 2026 Ontario Mixed Doubles Championship, earning the right to represent Ontario at the 2026 Canadian Mixed Doubles Curling Championship.

=== College ===
Jacob Horgan transferred to the Humber Hawks in 2024, winning back-to-back OCAA silver medals. In 2026, Horgan skipped the Hawks to the program's fourth CCAA national title, earning a CCAA All-Tournament First Team selection.Horgan and the Hawks finished the tournament with a 9-0 record, outscoring their opponents 64-34, with 11 stolen ends and 18 stolen points. The Hawks also led the tournament with a scoring average of 0.94 points per end.

== Personal life ==
Horgan attended Laurentian University for business administration, and currently attends Humber College, living in Mississauga. His siblings Tracy Fleury, Jennifer Wylie and Tanner Horgan are also accomplished curlers.

== Teams ==
Season	Skip	Third	Second	Lead	Alternate
2012–13	Tanner Horgan	Nicholas Servant	Jacob Horgan	Maxime Blais	
2013–14	Tanner Horgan	Nicholas Servant	Jacob Horgan	Maxime Blais	
2014–15	Tanner Horgan	Jacob Horgan	Connor Lawes	Maxime Blais	
2015–16	Tanner Horgan	Jacob Horgan	Connor Lawes	Maxime Blais	
2016–17	Tanner Horgan	Jacob Horgan	Nicholas Bissonnette	Maxime Blais	
2017–18	Tanner Horgan	Jacob Horgan	Nicholas Bissonnette	Maxime Blais	
2018–19	Tanner Horgan	Mark Kean	Jacob Horgan	Maxime Blais	
2019–20	Jacob Horgan	Scott Mitchell	Mitchell Cortello	Chase Dusessoy	
2020–21	Tanner Horgan	Jonathan Beuk	Wesley Forget	Scott Chadwick	Jacob Horgan
2021–22	Tanner Horgan	Jonathan Beuk	Wesley Forget	Scott Chadwick	Jacob Horgan
2022–23	Tanner Horgan (Fourth)	Darren Moulding (Skip)	Jacob Horgan	Colin Hodgson	
2023–24	Tanner Horgan	Jacob Horgan	Ian McMillan	Scott Chadwick	
2024–25	John Epping	Jacob Horgan	Tanner Horgan	Ian McMillan	
2025–26	John Epping	Jacob Horgan	Tanner Horgan	Ian McMillan	
2026–27	Brendan Bottcher	Jacob Horgan	Tanner Horgan	Geoff Walker	
