= Mike McCarville =

Canadian curler

- Curler
- Born: Michael McCarville; June 29, 1981 (age 45); Thunder Bay, Ontario

Team
- Curling club: Fort William CC, Thunder Bay, ON
- Skip: Kurtis Byrd
- Third: Mike McCarville
- Second: Kristofer Leupen
- Lead: Justin McCarville

Curling career
- Member Association: Northern Ontario
- Brier: 2 (2014, 2024)
- Other appearances: CJCC: 2 (1999, 2000); CMCC: 3 (2005, 2008, 2019)
- Top CTRS ranking: 27th (2013–14)

Mike Jeffrey McCarville is a Canadian curler from Thunder Bay, Ontario. He currently plays third on Team Kurtis Byrd.

== Career ==
McCarville played lead for Team Northern Ontario, skipped by Joe Scharf, at the Canadian Junior Curling Championships in 1999 and 2000, finishing with a 7–5 record and missing playoffs both times. In 2014, he won the Northern Ontario Men's Provincials as the third for Jeff Currie, qualifying for the 2014 Tim Hortons Brier. There, the team finished with a 2–9 record. On the World Curling Tour, McCarville has won the 2013 Bernick's Miller Lite Open.

McCarville has represented Northern Ontario in three Canadian Mixed Curling Championships, playing second each time. In 2005, his team, skipped by Joe Scharf, finished with a 5–6 record and out of playoffs. In 2008, he played for skip Mike Assad, finishing with a 6–5 record and out of playoffs. In 2019, he played for Trevor Bonot and finished the round robin with a 3–3 record, failing to advance to the championship pool. They finished the seeding pool with a 5–4 record. McCarville also won a sportsmanship award at the 2019 championship.

== Personal life ==
McCarville was married to curler Krista Scharf. They have two children. He is employed as a high school math and biology teacher at St. Ignatius High School. McCarville is of Indigenous descent.
