= Ryan Fry =

Canadian curler (born 1978)

- Curler
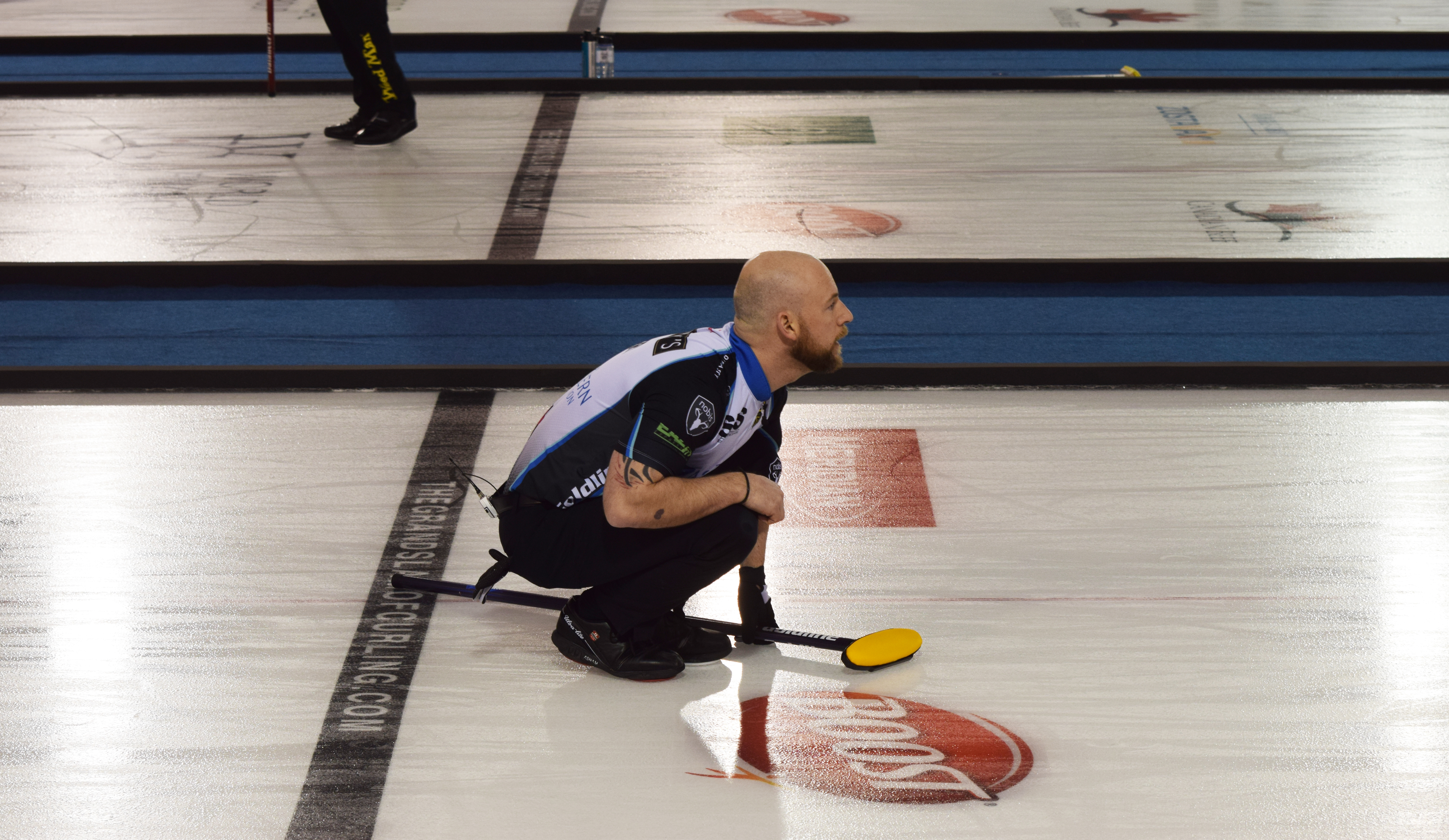
- Born: July 25, 1978 (age 48); Winnipeg, Manitoba, Canada

Team
- Curling club: Leaside CC, East York, Toronto, ON

Curling career
- Member Association: Manitoba (1995–2008); Newfoundland and Labrador (2008–2012); Northern Ontario (2012–2019); Ontario (2019–present)
- Brier: 14 (2007, 2009, 2010, 2011, 2012, 2013, 2015, 2016, 2017, 2018, 2019, 2020, 2021, 2023)
- World Championship: 1 (2013)
- Olympic: 1 (2014)
- Top CTRS ranking: 1st (2013–14)
- Grand Slam victories: 5 (2010 National (Jan.), 2015 Players', 2016 National, 2017 Champions Cup, 2018 Tour Challenge)
Medal record
Men's Curling
Representing Canada
Olympic Games
Gold medal – first place	2014 Sochi
World Championships
Silver medal – second place	2013 Victoria
Representing Manitoba
Tim Hortons Brier
Bronze medal – third place	2007 Hamilton
Representing Newfoundland and Labrador
Tim Hortons Brier
Bronze medal – third place	2011 London
Representing Northern Ontario
Canadian Olympic Curling Trials
Gold medal – first place	2013 Winnipeg
Tim Hortons Brier
Gold medal – first place	2013 Edmonton
Silver medal – second place	2015 Calgary
Bronze medal – third place	2016 Ottawa
Bronze medal – third place	2019 Brandon
Canadian Mixed Doubles Trials
Bronze medal – third place	2016 Saskatoon

Ryan Bennett Fry (born July 25, 1978) is a Canadian retired curler currently living in Toronto. He most recently played third on the Mike McEwen team and coached the Rachel Homan team. He currently coaches the Joël Retornaz rink. He previously played third for Team Brad Jacobs, and the team represented Canada and won the gold medal at the 2014 Winter Olympics. The team also won the 2013 Tim Hortons Brier. Fry won a silver medal at the 2013 World Men's Curling Championship.

== Career ==
Fry was born in Winnipeg, Manitoba, on July 25, 1978. Fry is a right-handed shooter and delivers "tuck" style. Fry skipped a junior men's team to the 1996 Canadian Junior Curling Championships and 1997 Canadian Junior Curling Championships representing Manitoba. Fry skipped men's teams to the 2005 and 2006 Manitoba Safeway Select (playdown to the Brier) and joined Jeff Stoughton's team playing third for the 2006–07 season.

Fry qualified for the 2014 Winter Olympics with the Brad Jacobs rink after defeating the John Morris rink in the final.

Fry accompanied the Stoughton rink to the 2007 Tim Hortons Brier in Hamilton where they lost the semi-finals to Glenn Howard's Ontario rink. Fry curled 85% in the round robin (second among thirds).

Fry left the Stoughton rink in 2008 to play for Brad Gushue's team in St. John's, Newfoundland and Labrador. Fry won the 2009, 2010, 2011 and 2012 Newfoundland and Labrador Tankards with the team, and represented Newfoundland and Labrador at the 2009, 2010, 2011 and 2012 Briers. Fry played with Gushue until moving to Sault Ste. Marie to play with Jacobs in 2012. Fry won his first The Dominion Northern Ontario Men's Curling Championship in 2013 with Jacobs and represented Northern Ontario at the Brier for the first time in 2013. This tied Earle Morris's record for most provinces represented at the Brier (at three; a feat which has since been duplicated by Earle's son John). Fry won the Brier with Northern Ontario and represented Canada at the 2013 Ford World Men's Curling Championship where the rink won a silver medal.

The Jacobs rink won the 2013 Canadian Olympic Curling Trials and went on to win the gold medal at the 2014 Winter Olympics.

Team Jacobs with Fry still at third would lose the 2015 Brier final to Team Canada (skipped Pat Simmons), win a bronze at the 2016 Brier, and lose the bronze medal game to Mike McEwen at the 2017 Brier. The team finished off the podium at the 2018 Tim Hortons Brier, finishing fourth.

After a November 2018 incident involving "unsportsmanlike behaviour" at the Red Deer Curling Classic (where Fry was sparing on a team skipped by Jamie Koe), Fry and others on his team were barred from the event and Fry announced he was taking a leave of absence. Fry missed two events on the team, but would return for the 2019 Canadian Open in January. Fry along with Team Jacobs represented Northern Ontario at the 2019 Tim Hortons Brier. The team went 9-2 in the round robin and championship round combined. Jacobs lost the 1 vs. 2 game to Kevin Koe and the semifinal to Brendan Bottcher resulting in the team getting the bronze medal. Team Jacobs announced in March 2019 that Fry would be parting ways with the team after the end of the 2018-2019 curling season. Fry played with the rink for 7 years but would join Team Epping for the 2019-20 season.

Team Epping had a strong start to the year, winning both the Stu Sells Oakville Tankard and the 2019 AMJ Campbell Shorty Jenkins Classic. They had a semifinal finish at the Masters, the first Grand Slam of the season. They missed the playoffs at the next two slams, the Tour Challenge and the National after going 1–3 at both. Team Epping posted a 6–2 record en route to winning the 2019 Canada Cup in Leduc, Alberta. This win qualified them to represent Team Canada along with five other Canadian teams at the 2020 Continental Cup where they lost 22.5–37.5 to the Europeans. They had a strong showing at the Canadian Open where they made it all the way to the final where they lost to the Brad Jacobs rink. At the 2020 Ontario Tankard, they completed their undefeated run throughout the week with an 8–3 win over Glenn Howard. Representing Ontario at the 2020 Tim Hortons Brier, they finished the championship pool with a 7–4 record and in a four way tie for fourth place. They defeated Team Wild Card (Mike McEwen) in the first tiebreaker before losing to Northern Ontario (Brad Jacobs) in the second and being eliminated from contention. It would be the team's last event of the season as both the Players' Championship and the Champions Cup Grand Slam events were cancelled due to the COVID-19 pandemic.

Team Epping began the 2020–21 season with a win at the 2020 Stu Sells Toronto Tankard. The 2021 Ontario provincial playdowns were cancelled due to the COVID-19 pandemic in Ontario. As the 2020 provincial champions, Team Epping was chosen to represent Ontario at the 2021 Tim Hortons Brier in Calgary. At the Brier, they finished with a 7–5 record.

== Personal life ==
Fry's father is Barry Fry, winner of the 1979 Brier, the Canadian Men's Curling Championship.

Fry attended the University of Manitoba where he graduated with a bachelor's degree in Business Administration. He is married to Jessica Szabo. He currently is the co-owner of Gravity Management.

== Teams ==
Season	Skip	Third	Second	Lead
2006–07	Jeff Stoughton	Ryan Fry	Rob Fowler	Steve Gould
2007–08	Jeff Stoughton	Ryan Fry	Rob Fowler	Steve Gould
2008–09	Brad Gushue	Mark Nichols	Ryan Fry	Jamie Korab
2009–10	Brad Gushue	Mark Nichols	Ryan Fry	Jamie Korab
2010–11 (Note: Ferbey left team mid-season)	Brad Gushue	Randy Ferbey (skip)	Mark Nichols	Ryan Fry
2011	Brad Gushue	Mark Nichols	Ryan Fry	Jamie Danbrook
2011–12	Brad Gushue	Ryan Fry	Geoff Walker	Adam Casey
2012	Brad Gushue	Ryan Fry	Adam Casey	Geoff Walker
2012–13	Brad Jacobs	Ryan Fry	E. J. Harnden	Ryan Harnden
2013–14	Brad Jacobs	Ryan Fry	E. J. Harnden	Ryan Harnden
2014–15	Brad Jacobs	Ryan Fry	E. J. Harnden	Ryan Harnden
2015–16	Brad Jacobs	Ryan Fry	E. J. Harnden	Ryan Harnden
2016–17	Brad Jacobs	Ryan Fry	E. J. Harnden	Ryan Harnden
2017–18	Brad Jacobs	Ryan Fry	E. J. Harnden	Ryan Harnden
2018–19	Brad Jacobs	Ryan Fry	E. J. Harnden	Ryan Harnden
2019–20	John Epping	Ryan Fry	Mat Camm	Brent Laing
2020–21	John Epping	Ryan Fry	Mat Camm	Brent Laing
2021–22	John Epping	Ryan Fry	Mat Camm	Brent Laing
2022–23	Mike McEwen	Ryan Fry	Jonathan Beuk; Joey Hart	Brent Laing
