= Fort William Curling Club =

Curling club in Thunder Bay, Ontario

- Location: 218 Vickers Street North; Thunder Bay, Ontario, Canada; P7C 6A3

Information
- Established: September 18, 1891
- Club type: Dedicated ice
- Curling Canada region: Northern Ontario
- Sheets of ice: Eight
- Rock colours: Blue and Yellow
- Website: https://www.fortwilliamcurlingclub.com/

The Fort William Curling Club is a curling club located in the Downtown Fort William neighbourhood of Thunder Bay, Ontario. The club hosted the Canadian men's curling championship in 1960 and the Canadian women's curling championship in 1969. It is also the home club of World Men's curling champions Al Hackner, Rick Lang, Bob Nicol, Bruce Kennedy, Ian Tetley, and Pat Perroud.

== History ==
The Fort William Curling Club was established in Fort William (now Thunder Bay) on September 18, 1891, on property leased by Peter and John McKellar. It was originally part of the Manitoba Curling Association. The rink was destroyed by fire twice, in 1892 and 1908. The current facility, with artificial ice, opened on March 10, 1951, as the Fort William Curling and Athletic Club. The club is adjacent to the Fort William Gardens.

== Notable members ==
Only events representing the Fort William Curling Club are listed.

- John McKellar – Mayor of Fort William (1892–1898)
- Robert Pow – 1932 Olympic champion; mayor of Fort William (1933–1936)
- Tom Tod – 1958 Canadian Schoolboys champion; 1970 Macdonald Brier participant
- Neil McLeod – 1958 Canadian Schoolboys champion
- Patrick Moran – 1958 Canadian Schoolboys champion
- David Allin – 1958 Canadian Schoolboys champion
- Darwin Wark – 1959 Macdonald Brier participant
- Dennis Stephen – 1959 Macdonald Brier participant
- Leslie Sutton – 1959 Macdonald Brier participant
- John Jones – 1959 Macdonald Brier participant
- James Carson – 1970 Macdonald Brier participant
- J. Carl Whitfield – 1970 Macdonald Brier participant
- Bill Hallinan – 1970 Macdonald Brier participant
- Bill Tetley – 1975 Macdonald Brier champion; 1975 World Men's bronze medallist
- Rick Lang – 1975 Macdonald Brier, 1982, and 1985 Labatt Brier champion; 1975 World Men's bronze medallist; 1976 Macdonald Brier, 1988, 1991, and 1995 Labatt Brier participant; 1980 and 1981 Labatt Brier runner-up; 1981 Canadian Mixed champion; 1982 and 1985 World Men's champion; 1993 Labatt Brier bronze medallist; 2006 Canadian Senior champion; 2007 World Senior silver medallist
- Bill Hodgson, Jr. – 1975 Macdonald Brier champion; 1975 World Men's bronze medallist
- Peter Hnatiw – 1975 Macdonald Brier champion; 1975 World Men's bronze medallist
- Bob Nicol – 1976 Macdonald Brier participant; 1980 and 1981 Labatt Brier runner-up; 1982 Labatt Brier champion; 1982 World Men's champion
- Al Fiskar, Jr. – 1976 Macdonald Brier participant
- Warren Butters – 1976 Macdonald Brier participant
- Al Hackner – 1980 and 1981 Labatt Brier runner-up; 1982 and 1985 Labatt Brier champion; 1982 and 1985 World Men's champion; 1988, 1989, 1995 Labatt Brier, and 2001 Nokia Brier participant; 2006 Canadian Senior champion; 2007 World Senior silver medallist
- Bruce Kennedy – 1980 and 1981 Labatt Brier runner-up; 1982 Labatt Brier champion; 1982 World Men's champion; 1987 Labatt Brier participant
- Anne Provo – 1981 Canadian Mixed champion; 1983 Scott Tournament of Hearts participant
- Bert Provo – 1981 Canadian Mixed champion
- Lorraine Lang – 1981 Canadian Mixed champion; 1983, 2006 Scott Tournament of Hearts, 2007, and 2009 Scotties Tournament of Hearts participant; 1991 Scott Tournament of Hearts bronze medallist; 2009 Canadian Olympic Curling Trials bronze medallist
- Marlene Delorenzi – 1983 Scott Tournament of Hearts participant
- Valerie Adams – 1983 Scott Tournament of Hearts participant
- Ian Tetley – 1985 Labatt Brier champion; 1985 World Men's champion
- Pat Perroud – 1985 Labatt Brier champion; 1985 World Men's champion
- Larry Pineau – 1987 Labatt Brier participant
- Jack Kallos – 1987 Labatt Brier participant
- Brian Snell – 1987 Labatt Brier participant
- Jim Adams – 1988 and 1989 Labatt Brier participant
- Doug Smith – 1988 Labatt Brier participant
- Bill Adams – 1989 Labatt Brier participant
- John Salo – 1989 Labatt Brier participant
- Jason Repay – 1991 Canadian Junior champion; 1992 World Junior bronze medallist
- Aaron Skillen – 1991 Canadian Junior champion; 1992 World Junior bronze medallist; 1995 Labatt Brier participant
- Scott McCallum – 1991 Canadian Junior champion; 1992 World Junior bronze medallist
- Trevor Clifford – 1991 Canadian Junior champion; 1992 World Junior bronze medallist
- Heather Houston – 1991 Scott Tournament of Hearts bronze medallist
- Diane Adams – 1991 Scott Tournament of Hearts bronze medallist
- Diane Pushkar – 1991 Scott Tournament of Hearts bronze medallist
- Scott Henderson – 1991 Labatt Brier and 2003 Nokia Brier participant; 1993 Labatt Brier bronze medallist
- Ross Tetley – 1991 Labatt Brier participant; 1993 Labatt Brier bronze medallist
- Art Lappalainen – 1991, 1995 Labatt Brier, and 2003 Nokia Brier participant; 1993 Labatt Brier bronze medallist
- Bryan Burgess – 2001 Nokia Brier participant
- Joe Scharf – 2001 Nokia Brier participant
- Mike Assad – 2001 Nokia Brier participant
- Mike Desilets – 2003 Nokia Brier participant
- Tim Lindsay – 2003 Nokia Brier participant
- Krista McCarville – 2006 Scott Tournament of Hearts, 2007, 2009, 2017, 2019, and 2020 Scotties Tournament of Hearts participant; 2010 Scotties Tournament of Hearts bronze medallist; 2009 Canadian Olympic Curling Trials bronze medallist; 2010 Canada Cup participant; 2016 Scotties Tournament of Hearts silver medallist; 2017 Canadian Olympic Curling Trials participant
- Tara George – 2006 Scott Tournament of Hearts, 2007, and 2009 Scotties Tournament of Hearts participant; 2009 Canadian Olympic Curling Trials bronze medallist; 2010 Scotties Tournament of Hearts bronze medallist
- Tiffany Stubbings – 2006 Scott Tournament of Hearts and 2007 Scotties Tournament of Hearts participant
- Al Laine – 2006 Canadian Senior champion; 2007 World Senior silver medallist
- Brian Adams – 2006 Canadian Senior champion; 2007 World Senior silver medallist
- Dylan Johnston – 2009 Canadian Junior silver medallist
- Cody Johnston – 2009 Canadian Junior silver medallist
- Michael Makela – 2009 Canadian Junior silver medallist
- Mike Badiuk – 2009 Canadian Junior silver medallist
- Kari Lavoie – 2009 Scotties Tournament of Hearts participant; 2009 Canadian Olympic Curling Trials bronze medallist; 2010 Scotties Tournament of Hearts bronze medallist; 2010 Canada Cup participant
- Ashley Sippala – 2010 Scotties Tournament of Hearts bronze medallist; 2010 Canada Cup participant; 2016 Scotties Tournament of Hearts silver medallist; 2017 and 2020 Scotties Tournament of Hearts participant; 2017 Canadian Olympic Curling Trials participant
- Sarah Potts – 2010 Canada Cup participant; 2016 Scotties Tournament of Hearts silver medallist; 2017 and 2019 Scotties Tournament of Hearts participant; 2017 Canadian Olympic Curling Trials participant
- Jeff Currie – 2014 Tim Hortons Brier participant
- Mike McCarville – 2014 Tim Hortons Brier participant
- Colin Koivula – 2014 Tim Hortons Brier participant
- Jamie Childs – 2014 Tim Hortons Brier participant

== Events ==
The Fort William Curling Club has hosted several Canadian national curling championships. In 1960, the club co-hosted the Macdonald Brier, the Canadian men's curling championship, at the Fort William Gardens. The club also hosted the 1966 Canadian Mixed Curling Championship and the Canadian Ladies Curling Association Championship in 1969. In 2006, the Fort William and Port Arthur Curling Clubs co-hosted the Canadian Junior Curling Championships in Thunder Bay. The Fort William Curling Club also hosted the Canadian Wheelchair Curling Championship in 2012, where a team from the club, skipped by Carl Levesque, represented Northern Ontario. The following year, the club hosted the 2013 The Dominion Curling Club Championship, the Canadian championships for club-level curlers. In 2017, the club hosted the U Sports/Curling Canada University Curling Championships.

The club has also hosted several Northern Ontario provincial curling championships. It hosted the men's provincial championship in 2011 and in 2017. The club also hosted the 2015 Northern Ontario Scotties Tournament of Hearts, which was the first time that the Northern Ontario women's provincial champions received a direct berth into the national Scotties Tournament of Hearts and represented Northern Ontario separately from Ontario.

== Provincial champions ==
Year	Event	Skip	Third	Second	Lead	Record at Nationals	Record at Worlds
1958	Northern Ontario Junior Men's	Tom Tod	Neil McLeod	Patrick Moran	David Allin	1st	N/A
1959	Northern Ontario Junior Men's	Tom Tod	Bill Burn	Larry Gander	Ted Gregor		N/A
1959	Northern Ontario Men's	Darwin Wark	Dennis Stephen	Leslie Sutton	John Jones	5th (6–4)	—
1960	Ontario Women's	Elsie Forsyth	Helen Morgan	Anne Brown	Ina Oikonen	2nd (3–1, E. Can)	—
1970	Northern Ontario Men's	Tom Tod	James Carson	J. Carl Whitfield	Bill Hallinan	5th (5–5)	—
1971	Northern Ontario Junior Men's	Douglas Smith	Warren Butters	Thomas Wiegand	Rick Lang		N/A
1975	Northern Ontario Men's	Bill Tetley	Rick Lang	Bill Hodgson, Jr.	Peter Hnatiw	1st (9–2)	3rd (7–3)
1976	Northern Ontario Mixed	Merto Penziwol	Eleanor Penziwol	Bob Kosloski	Nancy Coutts		N/A
1976	Northern Ontario Men's	Rick Lang	Bob Nicol	Al Fiskar, Jr.	Warren Butters	7th (5–6)	—
1980	Northern Ontario Men's	Al Hackner	Rick Lang	Bob Nichol	Bruce Kennedy	2nd (9–4)	—
1981	Northern Ontario Mixed	Rick Lang	Anne Provo	Bert Provo	Lorraine Edwards	1st	N/A
1981	Northern Ontario Junior Men's	Scott Henderson	Bill Adams	Jim Adams	Brad Coulson		—
1981	Northern Ontario Men's	Al Hackner	Rick Lang	Bob Nichol	Bruce Kennedy	2nd (9–3)	—
1982	Northern Ontario Junior Men's	Scott Henderson	Bill Adams	Jim Adams	Brad Coulson		—
1982	Northern Ontario Men's	Al Hackner	Rick Lang	Bob Nichol	Bruce Kennedy	1st (10–3)	1st (9–2)
1983	Ontario Women's	Anne Provo	Lorraine Lang	Marlene Delorenzi	Valerie Adams	T-6th (4–6)	—
1983	Northern Ontario Senior Men's	Carmon "Red" Ahrensback	Ron Depiero	John Andreychuk	Tom Crane		N/A
1984	Northern Ontario Mixed	Jim Adams	Kim Clark	Charlie Salina	Heather Houston		N/A
1985	Northern Ontario Men's	Al Hackner	Rick Lang	Ian Tetley	Pat Perroud	1st (9–4)	1st (8–3)
1986	Northern Ontario Junior Men's	Gary Champagne	Glen Kawahara	Dale Watson	Corey Stevenson	7th (4–7)	—
1987	Northern Ontario Men's	Larry Pineau	Jack Kallos	Brian Snell	Bruce Kennedy	8th (5–6)	—
1988	Northern Ontario Men's	Al Hackner	Rick Lang	Jim Adams	Doug Smith	7th (5–6)	—
1989	Northern Ontario Junior Men's	Craig Kochan	Mike Desilets	Aaron Skillen	Greg Kawahara	7th (6–5)	—
1989	Northern Ontario Men's	Al Hackner	Bill Adams	Jim Adams	John Salo	10th (3–8)	—
1991	Northern Ontario Junior Men's	Jason Repay	Aaron Skillen	Scott McCallum	Trevor Clifford	1st (10–3)	3rd (7–3)
1991	Ontario Women's	Heather Houston	Lorraine Lang	Diane Adams	Diane Pushkar	3rd (8–5)	—
1991	Northern Ontario Men's	Rick Lang	Scott Henderson	Ross Tetley	Art Lappalainen	4th (7–4)	—
1992	Northern Ontario Mixed	Jim Adams	Diane Adams	Bruce Hogue	Diane Hogue		N/A
1993	Northern Ontario Men's	Rick Lang	Scott Henderson	Ross Tetley	Art Lappalainen	3rd (9–5)	—
1994	Northern Ontario Junior Women's	Rhonda Halversen	Lisa Backman	Tiffany Stubbings	Michelle Boland	5th (7–5)	—
1995	Northern Ontario Men's	Al Hackner	Rick Lang	Aaron Skillen	Art Lappalainen	7th (6–5)	—
1997	Northern Ontario Junior Men's	Bryan Burgess	Joe Scharf	Robin Champagne	Mike Assad	8th (6–6)	—
1999	Northern Ontario Junior Men's	Joe Scharf	Robin Champagne	Colin Koivula	Mike McCarville	5th (7–5)	—
2000	Northern Ontario Senior Women's	Marion Ball	Madeline Gilbart	Lynn Reid	Judith Prystanski	11th (2–9)	N/A
2000	Northern Ontario Junior Men's	Joe Scharf	Robin Champagne	Colin Koivula	Mike McCarville	5th (7–5)	—
2000	Northern Ontario Junior Women's	Krista Scharf	Angie Del Pino	Laura Armitage	Maggie Carr	6th (7–5)	—
2001	Northern Ontario Junior Women's	Krista Scharf	Angie Del Pino	Laura Armitage	Maggie Carr	5th (7–5)	—
2001	Northern Ontario Men's	Al Hackner	Bryan Burgess	Joe Scharf	Mike Assad	9th (5–6)	—
2002	Northern Ontario Junior Women's	Krista Scharf	Julie Risi	Laura Armitage	Maggie Carr	8th (6–6)	—
2003	Northern Ontario Men's	Scott Henderson	Art Lappalainen	Mike Desilets	Tim Lindsay	7th (5–6)	—
2006	Northern Ontario Mixed	Mike Assad	Angela Lee	Ben Mikkelsen	Kari MacLean	11th (3–8)	N/A
2006	Ontario Women's	Krista Scharf	Tara George	Tiffany Stubbings	Lorraine Lang	10th (4–7)	—
2006	Northern Ontario Senior Men's	Al Hackner	Rick Lang	Al Laine	Brian Adams	1st (10–3)	2nd (6–2)
2007	Northern Ontario Women's	Krista Scharf	Tara George	Tiffany Stubbings	Lorraine Lang	N/A (Note: From 2007 to 2014, the winners of the Northern Ontario Scotties Tournament of Hearts did not qualify directly for the Scotties Tournament of Hearts. Instead, they received a berth into the Ontario Scotties Tournament of Hearts.)	N/A
2007	Ontario Women's	Krista Scharf	Tara George	Tiffany Stubbings	Lorraine Lang	6th (6–6)	—
2008	Northern Ontario Junior Men's	Kory Carr	Justin Whitehurst	Adam Lamers	Mark Adams	6th (7–5)	—
2008	Northern Ontario Junior Women's	Ashley Miharija	Sarah Lang	Jenna Enge	Jessica Williams	4th (8–5)	—
2009	Northern Ontario Junior Men's	Dylan Johnston	Cody Johnston	Michael Makela	Mike Badiuk	2nd (9–4)	—
2009	Northern Ontario Women's	Krista McCarville	Tara George	Kari MacLean	Lorraine Lang	N/A	N/A
2009	Ontario Women's	Krista McCarville	Tara George	Kari MacLean	Lorraine Lang	6th (6–5)	—
2010	Ontario Women's	Krista McCarville	Tara George	Ashley Miharija	Kari MacLean	3rd (9–5)	—
2010	Northern Ontario Senior Men's	Al Hackner	Art Lappalainen	Al Laine	Brian Adams	4th (7–4)	—
2011	Northern Ontario Mixed	Craig Kochan	Liz Kingston	Colin Koivula	Alissa Begin	9th (4–7)	N/A
2011	Northern Ontario Junior Men's	Cody Johnston	Mike Badiuk	Mark Adams	Mike Makela	8th (5–7)	—
2011	Northern Ontario Women's	Krista McCarville	Ashley Miharija	Kari MacLean	Sarah Lang	N/A	N/A
2012	Northern Ontario Mixed	Mike Assad	Alissa Begin	Andrew Nerpin	Jann Bobenic-Costante	9th (7–6)	N/A
2012	Northern Ontario Wheelchair	Carl Levesque	Rick Bell	Mel Prairie	Sharon LaFroye	5th (5–5)	N/A (Note: The winners of the Canadian Wheelchair Curling Championship do not directly qualify for the World Wheelchair Curling Championship.)
2013	Northern Ontario Mixed	Mike Assad	Ashley Kallos	Taylor Kallos	Kady Stachiw	6th (6–5)	N/A
2013	Northern Ontario Women's	Krista McCarville	Ashley Miharija	Kari Lavoie	Sarah Lang	N/A	N/A
2013	Northern Ontario Wheelchair	Gino Sonego	Doug Dean	Richard Dawid	Lola Graham	4th (5–5)	N/A
2014	Northern Ontario Men's	Jeff Currie	Mike McCarville	Colin Koivula	Jamie Childs	11th (2–9)	—
2014	Northern Ontario Wheelchair	Gino Sonego	Doug Dean	Richard Dawid	Lola Graham	7th (3–6)	N/A
2015	Northern Ontario Senior Men's	Al Hackner	Eric Harnden	Frank Morissette	Rob Thomas	9th (4–5)	N/A
2016	Northern Ontario Women's	Krista McCarville	Kendra Lilly	Ashley Sippala	Sarah Potts	2nd (9–5)	—
2017	Northern Ontario Women's	Krista McCarville	Kendra Lilly	Ashley Sippala	Sarah Potts	4th (9–5)	—
2017	Northern Ontario Wheelchair	Doug Dean	Gino Sonego	Rick Bell	Lola Graham	8th (3–6)	N/A
2018	Northern Ontario Junior Women's	Hailey Beaudry	Kendra Lemieux	Emily Cooney	Erin Tomalty	8th (3–7)	—
2018	Northern Ontario Senior Men's	Al Hackner	Eric Harnden	Frank Morissette	Gary Champagne	3rd (9–3)	—
2019	Northern Ontario Women's	Krista McCarville	Kendra Lilly	Jen Gates	Sarah Potts	4th (8–4)	—
2019	Northern Ontario Senior Men's	Al Hackner	Frank Morissette	Robert Whalen	Gary Champagne	6th (5–5)	—
2019	Northern Ontario Wheelchair	Doug Dean	Gino Sonego	Rick Bell	Lola Graham	4th (5–4)	N/A
2019	Northern Ontario Club Women's	Tracey Larocque	Corie Adamson	Rebecca Carr	Emily Juurakko	T-13th (1–5)	N/A
2020	Northern Ontario Women's	Krista McCarville	Kendra Lilly	Ashley Sippala	Jen Gates	4th (8–4)	—
2020	Northern Ontario Senior Men's	Mike Desilets	Scott Henderson	Dale Wiersema	William Peloza	N/A	N/A
2020	Northern Ontario Wheelchair	Douglas Dean	Gino Sonego	Richard Bell	Lola Graham	N/A	N/A
2021	Northern Ontario Club Women's	Tracey Larocque	Samantha Morris	Corie Adamson	Rebecca Carr	1st (7–1)	N/A
2023	Northern Ontario Women's	Krista McCarville	Kendra Lilly	Ashley Sippala	Sarah Potts	3rd (8–3)	—
2024	Northern Ontario Women's	Krista McCarville	Andrea Kelly	Kendra Lilly	Ashley Sippala	8th (4–4)	—
2025	Northern Ontario Women's	Krista McCarville	Andrea Kelly	Ashley Sippala	Kendra Lilly	12th (4–4)	—
2026	Northern Ontario Women's	Krista Scharf	Ashley Sippala	Kendra Lilly	Sarah Potts	7th (5–3)	—
2026	Northern Ontario Mixed	Bryan Burgess	Oye-Sem Won	Mike McCarville	Rebecca Carr	3rd (8–4)	—
2026	Northern Ontario Club Men's	Bryan Burgess	Gary Weiss	Dale Wiersema	Aaron Rogalski		N/A
2026	Northern Ontario Club Women's	Ashley Palmer	Oye-Sem Won	Corie Adamson	Michelle Bolan		N/A

== Presidents ==
- 1923–1927: C. McEwan
- 1941–1942: J. Cassidy
- 1942–1944: Ira Gerry
- 1947–1948: R.H. Smith
- 1948–1950: George Charlesbois
- 1950–1952: George Breckman
- 1953–1957: Len Cameron
- 1957–1959: Dick Symes
- 1959–1961: Tom Fry
- 1961–1963: Ted Childs
- 1963: David Stevens
- 1963–1965: Jim Andros
- 1965–1967: Godon Holt
- 1967–1968: Jack Taylor
- 1968–1970: Jack Kallos Sr.
- 1970–1972: Peter Good
- 1972–1974: Fred Bullough
- 1974–1976: Bob Morrison
- 1976–1978: Ed Howe
- 1978–1980: Tom Crane
- 1980–1982: Rob Sinclair
- 1982–1984: Ron Babcock
- 1984–1986: Peter McCallum
- 1986–1988: Fred Coulson
- 1988–1990: Bill Charlebois
- 1990–1992: Ed Wakewich
- 1992–1994: Ron Campbell
- 1994–1996: Ellie Stecky
- 1996–1998: Alf Childs III
- 1998–2000: Morris Stoyka
- 2000–2002: Paul Finlay
- 2002–2004: Terry Douglas
- 2004–2006: Kris Woznesensky
- 2006–2008: Jack Kallos Jr.
- 2008–2009: Rob Chicorli
- 2009–2011: Sam Barbisan
- 2011–2013: Rose Steadwell
- 2013–2015: Dave Kawahara
- 2015–2017: Stan Nemec
- 2017–2019: Rick Sutton
- 2019–2021: Denise Hardy
- 2021-2023: Ken Kopechanski
- 2023-present: Kevan Stranges
