= Ryan Harnden =

Canadian curler (born 1986)

- Curler
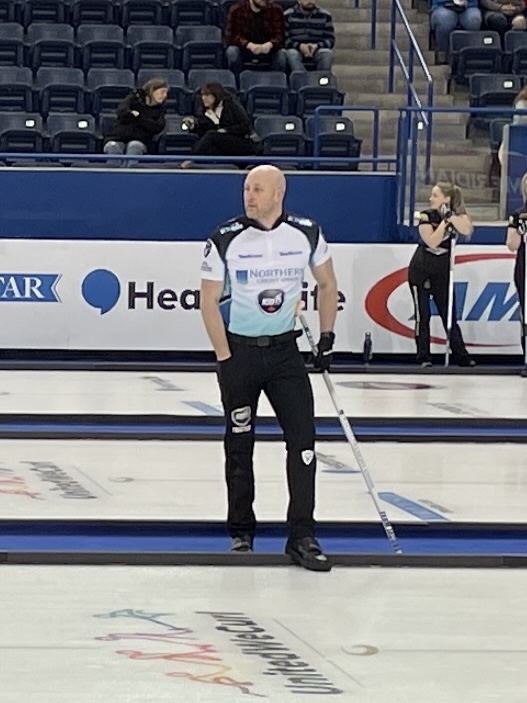
- Harnden at the 2022 Players' Championship
- Born: June 28, 1986 (age 40); Sault Ste. Marie, Ontario

Team
- Curling club: Community First CC, Sault Ste. Marie, ON
- Skip: Matt Dunstone
- Third: Colton Lott
- Second: Mark Nichols
- Lead: Ryan Harnden

Curling career
- Member Association: Northern Ontario (2006–2022); Manitoba (2022–present)
- Brier: 17 (2008, 2010, 2011, 2012, 2013, 2015, 2016, 2017, 2018, 2019, 2020, 2021, 2022, 2023, 2024, 2025, 2026)
- World Championship: 3 (2013, 2023, 2026)
- Olympic: 1 (2014)
- Top CTRS ranking: 1st (2013–14; 2019–20)
- Grand Slam victories: 9 (2015 Players', 2016 National, 2017 Champions Cup, 2018 Tour Challenge, 2019 Tour Challenge, 2019 National, 2020 Canadian Open, 2025 Masters (Sept.), 2026 Masters)
Medal record
Men's curling
Representing Canada
Olympic Games
Gold medal – first place	2014 Sochi
World Championships
Silver medal – second place	2013 Victoria
Silver medal – second place	2023 Ottawa
Silver medal – second place	2026 Ogden
Representing Northern Ontario
Canadian Olympic Curling Trials
Gold medal – first place	2013 Winnipeg
Silver medal – second place	2021 Saskatoon
The Brier
Gold medal – first place	2013 Edmonton
Silver medal – second place	2015 Calgary
Bronze medal – third place	2010 Halifax
Bronze medal – third place	2016 Ottawa
Bronze medal – third place	2019 Brandon
Representing Manitoba
Canadian Olympic Curling Trials
Silver medal – second place	2025 Halifax
The Brier
Gold medal – first place	2026 St. John's
Silver medal – second place	2023 London
Silver medal – second place	2025 Kelowna

Ryan Harnden (born June 28, 1986) is a Canadian curler. He currently plays lead on Team Matt Dunstone. He is the former lead for the Brad Jacobs rink, with whom he represented Canada at the 2014 Winter Olympics, winning a gold medal.

== Career ==
=== Early career ===
Ryan joined forces with his father Eric Harnden for the 2007–08 season, as his second. The team, which also included brother E. J. and Caleb Flaxey at lead won the Dominion Northern Ontario Men's Curling Championship that season, and would represent Northern Ontario at the 2008 Tim Hortons Brier. The team would have an unsuccessful Brier, finishing with a 3–8 record. Following the season, Harnden joined forces with Brad Jacobs, and played with Jacobs until 2022. He would play second for the team from 2008 to 2011 and then lead since 2012, after Ryan Fry joined the team as third, and E. J. replaced Ryan at second. In their first season together, the team lost in the 2009 Northern Ontario final to Mike Jakubo. The following season would be more successful. The team played in one Grand Slam, the 2012 The National that season, Harnden's first. The team went 0–5. However, the team did win The Dominion 2010 Northern Ontario Provincial Men's Championship and had a tremendous Brier that season. At the 2010 Tim Hortons Brier, the team finished 2nd after the round robin with a 9–2 record. However, they lost both of their playoff games and would have to settle for a bronze medal.

=== 2010–2012 ===
During the 2010–11 season, the team played in two Grand Slams. They first played in the 2010 World Cup of Curling, where they finished 2–3. The team also played in the 2011 Players' Championship, but Harnden sat the event out, and was replaced by Ted Appelman. That season, the team would then go on to win their second straight provincial title, by winning The Dominion 2011 Northern Ontario Men's Curling Championship. While they had a decent 7–4 record at the 2011 Tim Hortons Brier, it was not enough to make the playoffs, and they had to settle for 5th. For the 2011–12 season, the team entered two Slams, the 2011 World Cup of Curling where they had a 2–3 record) and the 2011 BDO Canadian Open where they made the playoffs for the first time, but lost in the quarter-final. The team would then go on to win The Dominion 2012 Northern Ontario Men's Curling Championship, their third straight title. At the 2012 Tim Hortons Brier, they once again finished 5th, but with a worse 5–6 record.

=== 2012–2014 ===
The 2012–13 season would be the team's best season to date. The team welcomed Manitoba-born Ryan Fry at the third position, bumping E. J. to play second and Ryan to play lead. The team would make the playoffs in all three Slams they entered, losing in the quarterfinals of the 2012 Masters of Curling and 2013 The National. They made it to the final in their first ever slam at the 2012 Canadian Open of Curling where they lost to the Glenn Howard rink. The team won The Dominion 2013 Northern Ontario Men's Curling Championship once again, qualifying for the Brier for the fourth straight year. At the Brier, the team finished the round robin with an 8–3 record, good enough for 4th. The team pulled off victories against Newfoundland and Labrador's Brad Gushue, Ontario's Glenn Howard and Manitoba's Jeff Stoughton en route to win Northern Ontario's first Brier title in 28 years. The team would later represent Canada at the 2013 Ford World Men's Curling Championship where they won a silver medal. The next season, the team won the 2013 Canadian Olympic Curling Trials, earning them the right to represent Canada at the 2014 Winter Olympics. At the Olympics in Sochi, they led Canada to a 9–3 victory in the men's final, defeating Great Britain to claim the gold medal.

=== 2014–2019 ===
Following their Olympic success, the Jacobs rink once again made it to the Brier in 2015. After posting a 10–1 round robin record in first place, they won the 1 vs. 2 game sending them to the finals against the defending Brier champions, Team Canada (skipped by Pat Simmons), which they lost. Later in the season the Jacobs rink won their first career Grand Slam event, winning the 2015 Players' Championship.

At the 2016 Tim Hortons Brier, the Jacobs rink once again tore through the round robin, going undefeated to finish in first place. However, they ran into trouble in the playoffs, losing to Newfoundland and Labrador in the 1 vs. 2 game and to Alberta in the semifinal. They did rebound in the bronze medal game, defeating Manitoba to finish third overall.

The 2016–17 season would be the best to date for the Jacobs rink on the World Curling Tour, winning two slams, the 2016 Boost National and the 2017 Humpty's Champions Cup. At the 2017 Tim Hortons Brier, the team would once again make the playoffs, after posting an 8-3 round robin record. However, they lost both of their playoff games, settling for fourth place.

The Jacobs team played in the 2017 Canadian Olympic Curling Trials attempting to head to the Olympics again, but his team would finish with a disappointing 3–5 record, missing the playoffs. The team again represented Northern Ontario at the 2018 Tim Hortons Brier, making it to the playoffs with an 8–3 record, but lost to Alberta's Brendan Bottcher rink in the 3 vs. 4 game.

The next season, the Jacobs rink won the 2018 Tour Challenge Grand Slam event. A month later, the team won the 2018 Canada Cup, their first Canada Cup title, defeating Kevin Koe's rink in the final. The team had Marc Kennedy playing third, filling in for Ryan Fry, who was on sabbatical following unsportsmanlike behaviour and excessive drinking at the 2018 Red Deer Curling Classic. The team once again represented Northern Ontario at the 2019 Tim Hortons Brier. The team went 9–2 in the round robin and championship round combined. Jacobs lost the 1 vs. 2 game to Kevin Koe and the semifinal to Brendan Bottcher resulting in the team getting the bronze medal.

=== 2019–present ===
The following season, the team officially added Kennedy to the line-up at third with Fry going to play with John Epping. In their first event, the 2019 AMJ Campbell Shorty Jenkins Classic, the team went undefeated up until the final where they would lose to former teammate Fry and Team Epping. Team Jacobs won three straight Grand Slam events, at the Tour Challenge, National and the Canadian Open. They would win the 2020 Northern Ontario Men's Provincial Curling Championship for the sixth year in a row. At the 2020 Tim Hortons Brier, they battled through two tiebreakers before losing to Newfoundland and Labrador's Brad Gushue in the 3 vs. 4 game, all within the same day. It would be the team's last event of the season as both the Players' Championship and the Champions Cup Grand Slam events were cancelled due to the COVID-19 pandemic.

Team Jacobs played in two tour events during the 2020–21 season, winning the Stu Sells Oakville Tankard and losing in the qualification game of the Ashley HomeStore Curling Classic. Due to the COVID-19 pandemic in Ontario, the 2021 provincial championship was cancelled. As the reigning provincial champions, Team Jacobs was chosen to represent Northern Ontario at the 2021 Tim Hortons Brier. At the Brier, they finished with a 7–5 record.

== Personal life ==
Harnden is the son of three-time Northern Ontario champion Eric Harnden. He attended Sault College (where he received a business diploma), the University of British Columbia (for real estate appraisal) and Algoma University (geography). He is married to Jasmine Gassi, and has one child. He is currently employed as a real estate agent for Royal LePage Northern Advantage and has been a substitute teacher with the Algoma District School Board.

== Teams ==
Season	Skip	Third	Second	Lead
2006–07	Ryan Harnden	Clint Cudmore	Johnny Miners	Steve Molodowich
2007–08	Eric Harnden	E. J. Harnden	Ryan Harnden	Caleb Flaxey
2008–09	Brad Jacobs	E. J. Harnden	Ryan Harnden	Caleb Flaxey
2009–10	Brad Jacobs	E. J. Harnden	Ryan Harnden	Caleb Flaxey
2010–11	Brad Jacobs	E. J. Harnden	Ryan Harnden	Scott Seabrook
2011–12	Brad Jacobs	E. J. Harnden	Ryan Harnden	Scott Seabrook
2012–13	Brad Jacobs	Ryan Fry	E. J. Harnden	Ryan Harnden
2013–14	Brad Jacobs	Ryan Fry	E. J. Harnden	Ryan Harnden
2014–15	Brad Jacobs	Ryan Fry	E. J. Harnden	Ryan Harnden
2015–16	Brad Jacobs	Ryan Fry	E. J. Harnden	Ryan Harnden
2016–17	Brad Jacobs	Ryan Fry	E. J. Harnden	Ryan Harnden
2017–18	Brad Jacobs	Ryan Fry	E. J. Harnden	Ryan Harnden
2018–19	Brad Jacobs	Ryan Fry	E. J. Harnden	Ryan Harnden
2019–20	Brad Jacobs	Marc Kennedy	E. J. Harnden	Ryan Harnden
2020–21	Brad Jacobs	Marc Kennedy	E. J. Harnden	Ryan Harnden
2021–22	Brad Jacobs	Marc Kennedy	E. J. Harnden	Ryan Harnden
2022–23	Matt Dunstone	B. J. Neufeld	Colton Lott	Ryan Harnden
2023–24	Matt Dunstone	B. J. Neufeld	Colton Lott	Ryan Harnden
2024–25	Matt Dunstone	B. J. Neufeld (Sept.–Dec.)	Colton Lott	Ryan Harnden
2024–25	Matt Dunstone	Colton Lott	E. J. Harnden (Dec.–Apr.)	Ryan Harnden
2025–26	Matt Dunstone	Colton Lott	E. J. Harnden	Ryan Harnden
2026–27	Matt Dunstone	Colton Lott	Mark Nichols	Ryan Harnden

== Awards ==
- Brier: First Team All-Star, Lead - 2025
- Brier: Second Team All-Star, Lead - 2021 and 2026
