= Soo Curlers Association =

Curling club in Sault Ste. Marie, Ontario

- Arena: YNCU Curling Centre; 124 Anita Blvd; Sault Ste. Marie

Information
- Established: 1944; 82 years ago
- Club type: Dedicated ice
- Sheets of ice: 8
- Rock colours: Green and Yellow
- Website: http://www.soocurlers.com/

Soo Curlers Association is a curling club located in Sault Ste. Marie, Ontario. The curling club has been a registered club since 1944. The club was home to the 2014 Olympic gold medallist Team Brad Jacobs.

The club plays at the YNCU Curling Centre, formerly the Community First Curling Centre, which was given its name in 2015 after being sponsored by Community First Credit Union.

The Soo Curlers Association is home to the Henderson Metal Fall Classic event where teams from around the world to compete for cash and move up the World Curling team rankings.

== Alumni ==
| Name | Notable Events |
|---|---|
| Ryan Fry | 2013 Tim Hortons Brier, 2013 ROTR |
| Brad Jacobs | 2013 Tim Hortons Brier, 2013 ROTR |
| E.J. Harnden | 2013 Tim Hortons Brier, 2013 ROTR |
| Ryan Harnden | 2013 Tim Hortons Brier, 2013 ROTR |

== Fall Classic ==
Fall Classic Event Sponsors
| Year | Main Sponsor |
|---|---|
| 2023 | Kioti Tractors Canada |
| 2024 | Henderson Metal |
