= 2011 Newfoundland and Labrador Tankard =

- Host city: St. John's
- Arena: Remax Centre
- Dates: February 1–5
- Winner: Brad Gushue
- Curling club: Bally Haly G&CC, St. John's
- Skip: Brad Gushue
- Third: Mark Nichols
- Second: Ryan Fry
- Lead: Jamie Danbrook
- Finalist: Alex Smith

The 2011 Newfoundland and Labrador Tankard was held February 1–5 at the Remax Centre in St. John's, Newfoundland and Labrador. The winning team of Brad Gushue represented Newfoundland and Labrador at the 2011 Tim Hortons Brier in London, Ontario.

== Teams ==
Skip	Third	Second	Lead	Alternate	Club(s)
Brad Gushue	Mark Nichols	Ryan Fry	Jamie Danbrook		Bally Haly Golf and Curling Club, St. John's, Newfoundland and Labrador
Ken Peddigrew	Dave Noftall	Jeff Rose	Keith Jewer		Re/Max Centre, St. John's
Keith Ryan	Barry Edwards	Mike Ryan	Dennin Langdon	Corey Hennessey	Carol Curling Club, Labrador City, Labrador
Alex Smith	Rick Rowsell	Randy Turpin	Craig Dowden		Re/Max Centre, St. John's
Andrew Symonds	Stephen Ryan	Kelly Schuh	Mark Healey		Re/Max Centre, St. John's
Ryan Withycombe	Matthew Hunt	Scott Eaton	Tyler Brown		Bally Haly Golf and Curling Club, St. John's

== Standings ==
Skip (Club)	W	L	PF	PA	Ends Won	Ends Lost	Blank Ends	Stolen Ends
Brad Gushue (Bally Haly)	5	0	35	15	22	12	9	6
Alex Smith (Re/Max Centre)	3	2	39	34	21	23	3	5
Andrew Symonds (Re/Max Centre)	3	2	35	36	20	21	6	1
Keith Ryan (Carroll)	2	3	29	32	19	23	5	5
Ken Peddigrew (Re/Max Centre)	1	4	24	32	19	17	7	4
Ryan Withycombe (Bally Haly)	1	4	22	32	16	21	6	3

== Round robin ==
- All times NST

=== Draw 1 ===
February 2, 7:00pm

Sheet 3	1	2	3	4	5	6	7	8	9	10	11	Final
Alex Smith	0	1	0	0	1	2	1	0	0	2	0	7
Keith Ryan	1	0	3	1	0	0	0	1	1	0	1	8

Sheet 4	1	2	3	4	5	6	7	8	9	10	Final
Ryan Withycombe	0	0	0	0	0	0	0	1	X	X	1
Ken Peddigrew	0	1	0	2	1	1	1	0	X	X	6

Sheet 5	1	2	3	4	5	6	7	8	9	10	Final
Brad Gushue	0	2	0	1	2	0	2	0	0	X	7
Andrew Symonds	1	0	0	0	0	0	1	0	1	X	3

=== Draw 2 ===
February 3, 1:00pm

Sheet 3	1	2	3	4	5	6	7	8	9	10	Final
Ken Peddigrew	1	0	0	1	0	0	0	0	2	0	4
Andrew Symonds	0	1	0	0	2	0	2	0	0	1	6

Sheet 4	1	2	3	4	5	6	7	8	9	10	Final
Keith Ryan	0	0	0	1	0	1	0	0	0	X	2
Brad Gushue	0	1	1	0	1	0	0	0	3	X	6

Sheet 5	1	2	3	4	5	6	7	8	9	10	Final
Alex Smith	0	0	2	0	0	0	1	0	1	2	6
Ryan Withycombe	2	0	0	1	0	1	0	1	0	0	5

=== Draw 3 ===
February 3, 7:00pm

Sheet 3	1	2	3	4	5	6	7	8	9	10	Final
Keith Ryan	0	1	2	1	0	0	1	0	0	0	5
Ryan Withycombe	1	0	0	0	1	1	0	0	2	1	6

Sheet 5	1	2	3	4	5	6	7	8	9	10	Final
Ken Peddigrew	1	0	0	0	0	1	0	1	0	X	3
Brad Gushue	0	3	0	2	0	0	1	0	2	X	8

Sheet 6	1	2	3	4	5	6	7	8	9	10	Final
Alex Smith	2	0	1	0	2	1	0	4	0	X	10
Andrew Symonds	0	2	0	3	0	0	1	0	2	X	8

=== Draw 4 ===
February 4, 9:00am

Sheet 4	1	2	3	4	5	6	7	8	9	10	Final
Alex Smith	0	1	0	0	3	0	2	0	4	X	10
Ken Peddigrew	1	0	2	0	0	1	0	2	0	X	6

Sheet 5	1	2	3	4	5	6	7	8	9	10	Final
Keith Ryan	0	0	0	0	2	0	2	0	2	1	7
Andrew Symonds	1	1	0	3	0	2	0	1	0	0	8

Sheet 6	1	2	3	4	5	6	7	8	9	10	Final
Ryan Withycombe	0	0	0	0	0	1	0	X	X	X	1
Brad Gushue	1	0	2	0	1	0	3	X	X	X	7

=== Draw 5 ===
February 4, 2:00pm

Sheet 3	1	2	3	4	5	6	7	8	9	10	Final
Alex Smith	0	0	3	1	0	0	0	2	0	0	6
Brad Gushue	1	0	0	0	1	2	1	0	1	1	7

Sheet 4	1	2	3	4	5	6	7	8	9	10	Final
Ryan Withycombe	1	0	2	0	0	0	2	0	2	1	8
Andrew Symonds	0	1	0	4	0	2	0	2	0	0	9

Sheet 6	1	2	3	4	5	6	7	8	9	10	Final
Keith Ryan	0	1	0	2	0	4	0	X	X	X	7
Ken Peddigrew	2	0	1	0	1	0	1	X	X	X	5

== Playoffs ==
Semifinal			Final
			1	Brad Gushue	7
2	Alex Smith	7	2	Alex Smith	1
3	Andrew Symonds	4

=== Semifinal ===
February 5, 1:00 PM

Sheet 2	1	2	3	4	5	6	7	8	9	10	Final
Alex Smith	2	1	0	2	1	0	0	1	0	X	7
Andrew Symonds	0	0	1	0	0	1	0	0	2	X	4

=== Final ===
February 5, 7:00 PM

Sheet 2	1	2	3	4	5	6	7	8	9	10	Final
Brad Gushue	1	1	0	0	0	2	3	X	X	X	7
Alex Smith	0	0	0	0	1	0	0	X	X	X	1
