= The Dominion 2011 Northern Ontario Men's Curling Championship =

- Host city: Thunder Bay, Ontario
- Arena: Fort William Curling Club
- Dates: February 5–12
- Winner: Team Jacobs
- Curling club: Community First CC, Sault Ste. Marie
- Skip: Brad Jacobs
- Third: E. J. Harnden
- Second: Ryan Harnden
- Lead: Scott Seabrook
- Finalist: Joe Scharf

The 2011 Dominion of Canada Northern Ontario Provincial Men's Curling Championship was held February 6–13 at the Fort William Curling Club in Thunder Bay, Ontario. The winning team of Brad Jacobs represented Northern Ontario at the 2011 Tim Hortons Brier in London, Ontario.

== Teams ==
Skip	Third	Second	Lead	Club(s)
Mike Assad	Al Hackner	Justin Whitehurst	Jamie Childs	Fort William Curling Club, Thunder Bay, Ontario
Jeff Brown	Dustin Montpellier (Skip)	Nicholas Beaudry	Travis Gosselin	North Bay Granite Curling Club, North Bay, Ontario
Bryan Burgess	Gary Weiss	Dale Wiersema	Pat Berezowski	Port Arthur Curling Club, Thunder Bay, Ontario
Jeff Currie	Brian Adams	Colin Koivula	Dylan Johnston	Port Arthur Curling Club, Thunder Bay, Ontario
Robbie Gordon	Sandy MacEwan	Jamie Morphet	Tyler Steward	Sudbury Curling Club, Sudbury, Ontario
Brad Jacobs	E. J. Harnden	Ryan Harnden	Scott Seabrook	Soo Curlers Association, Sault Ste. Marie
Mike Jakubo	Matt Seabrook	Luc Ouimet	Lee Toner	Copper Cliff Curling Club, Copper Cliff, Ontario
David MacInnes	Brian Fawcett	Steve Burnett	Mark Fawcett	Englehart Curling Club, Englehart, Ontario
Tim Nordin	Mitch Sequin	Adam Bolen	Travis Showalter	Stratton Curling Club, Stratton, Ontario
Mike Pozihun	Deron Surkan	BJ Skinner	Aaron Rogalski	Port Arthur Curling Club, Thunder Bay, Ontario
John Salo	Kris Leupen	Cory Nephin	Mike Baduik	Geraldton Curling Club, Geraldton, Ontario
Joe Scharf	Mike McCarville	Rob Champagne	Gary Champagne	Fort William Curling Club, Thunder Bay, Ontario

== Standings ==
Skip (Club)	W	L	PF	PA	Ends Won	Ends Lost	Blank Ends	Stolen Ends
Joe Scharf (Fort William)	9	2	72	50	40	34	24	11
Brad Jacobs (Soo C.A)	9	2	71	36	40	29	22	12
Mike Jakubo (Copper Cliff)	7	4	65	52	42	38	18	12
Mike Assad (Fort William)	7	4	80	62	52	45	9	15
Mike Pozihun (Port Arthur)	7	4	72	53	49	38	13	14
John Salo (Geraldton)	6	5	57	65	45	39	15	16
Bryan Burgess (Fort William)	5	6	68	73	42	46	18	7
Jeff Currie (Port Arthur)	5	6	64	68	43	47	15	11
Robbie Gordon (Sudbury)	4	7	59	65	42	46	16	10
Tim Nordin (Stratton)	3	8	41	75	30	52	17	10
David MacInnes (Englehart)	2	9	51	72	35	40	16	8
Dustin Montpellier (North Bay Granite)	2	9	49	75	33	48	19	8

== Results ==
=== Draw 1 ===
February 6, 2:30 PM

Sheet 3	1	2	3	4	5	6	7	8	9	10	Final
Assad	2	0	2	0	1	0	0	2	0	X	7
Pozihun 🔨	0	1	0	1	0	0	1	0	1	X	4

Sheet 4	1	2	3	4	5	6	7	8	9	10	Final
Currie	0	1	0	1	0	0	1	0	1	X	4
Jakubo	0	0	1	0	2	1	0	2	0	X	6

Sheet 5	1	2	3	4	5	6	7	8	9	10	Final
Gordon	0	0	1	0	3	1	1	2	X	X	8
Montpellier 🔨	0	2	0	0	0	0	0	0	X	X	2

Sheet 6	1	2	3	4	5	6	7	8	9	10	Final
Salo	1	0	0	2	0	2	2	0	1	X	8
Burgess 🔨	0	2	0	0	1	0	0	2	0	X	5

=== Draw 2 ===
February 6, 7:30 PM

Sheet 3	1	2	3	4	5	6	7	8	9	10	Final
Salo 🔨	1	1	0	1	1	1	0	0	0	1	6
Currie	0	0	0	0	0	0	1	2	2	0	5

Sheet 4	1	2	3	4	5	6	7	8	9	10	Final
Scharf	0	0	0	1	0	2	1	0	4	X	8
MacInnes 🔨	0	0	2	0	1	0	0	1	0	X	4

Sheet 5	1	2	3	4	5	6	7	8	9	10	Final
Jacobs 🔨	3	0	1	1	4	2	X	X	X	X	11
Nordin	0	1	0	0	0	0	X	X	X	X	1

Sheet 6	1	2	3	4	5	6	7	8	9	10	Final
Montpellier	0	0	0	0	2	0	2	0	X	X	4
Pozihun 🔨	2	2	0	2	0	1	0	2	X	X	9

=== Draw 3 ===
February 7, 9:30 AM

Sheet 3	1	2	3	4	5	6	7	8	9	10	Final
MacInnes 🔨	0	1	0	1	2	1	0	0	2	0	6
Montpellier	0	0	4	0	0	0	1	1	0	1	7

Sheet 4	1	2	3	4	5	6	7	8	9	10	Final
Pozihun 🔨	0	0	0	1	0	0	1	0	0	X	2
Jacobs	0	0	1	0	0	2	0	2	0	X	5

Sheet 5	1	2	3	4	5	6	7	8	9	10	Final
Scharf	0	2	1	3	2	X	X	X	X	X	8
Salo 🔨	1	0	0	0	0	X	X	X	X	X	1

Sheet 6	1	2	3	4	5	6	7	8	9	10	11	Final
Nordin 🔨	0	2	0	1	0	0	0	1	1	0	0	5
Currie	0	0	1	0	2	0	1	0	0	1	1	6

=== Draw 4 ===
February 7, 2:30 PM

Sheet 3	1	2	3	4	5	6	7	8	9	10	Final
Jakubo 🔨	0	0	0	2	0	1	0	1	0	X	4
Scharf	0	0	0	0	1	0	3	0	3	X	7

Sheet 4	1	2	3	4	5	6	7	8	9	10	Final
Burgess	0	1	0	0	0	1	2	0	3	X	7
Nordin 🔨	0	0	0	2	0	0	0	2	0	X	4

Sheet 5	1	2	3	4	5	6	7	8	9	10	Final
Assad 🔨	2	1	1	0	1	0	4	X	X	X	9
MacInnes	0	0	0	1	0	2	0	X	X	X	3

Sheet 6	1	2	3	4	5	6	7	8	9	10	Final
Jacobs	0	1	0	0	0	0	0	1	1	1	4
Gordon 🔨	0	0	1	0	0	0	1	0	0	0	2

=== Draw 5 ===
February 7, 7:30 PM

Sheet 3	1	2	3	4	5	6	7	8	9	10	Final
Burgess 🔨	0	3	1	0	0	0	2	0	0	1	7
Gordon	0	0	0	2	1	0	0	1	1	0	5

Sheet 4	1	2	3	4	5	6	7	8	9	10	11	Final
Montpellier 🔨	0	1	0	0	0	1	0	0	0	1	0	3
Salo	0	0	0	1	0	0	1	1	0	0	2	5

Sheet 5	1	2	3	4	5	6	7	8	9	10	Final
Currie 🔨	0	0	2	0	0	1	0	1	0	0	4
Pozihun	1	0	0	2	1	0	1	0	1	1	7

Sheet 6	1	2	3	4	5	6	7	8	9	10	Final
Jakubo 🔨	1	3	1	0	1	0	0	0	0	X	6
Assad	0	0	0	1	0	0	1	1	1	X	4

=== Draw 6 ===
February 8, 9:00 AM

Sheet 3	1	2	3	4	5	6	7	8	9	10	Final
Assad 🔨	2	1	0	0	2	2	0	1	0	1	9
Gordon	0	0	1	1	0	0	2	0	2	0	6

Sheet 4	1	2	3	4	5	6	7	8	9	10	Final
Jakubo	0	0	0	0	2	0	0	1	0	X	3
Burgess 🔨	0	0	1	1	0	2	1	0	0	X	5

=== Draw 7 ===
February 8, 2:30 PM

Sheet 3	1	2	3	4	5	6	7	8	9	10	Final
Montpellier 🔨	2	0	0	0	0	0	0	1	X	X	3
Nordin	0	0	0	4	0	1	1	0	X	X	6

Sheet 4	1	2	3	4	5	6	7	8	9	10	Final
MacInnes	0	0	0	0	1	0	0	0	2	1	4
Currie 🔨	0	2	0	0	0	0	2	1	0	0	5

Sheet 5	1	2	3	4	5	6	7	8	9	10	Final
Salo	0	0	0	0	1	0	X	X	X	X	1
Jacobs 🔨	0	0	0	5	0	2	X	X	X	X	7

Sheet 6	1	2	3	4	5	6	7	8	9	10	Final
Pozihun 🔨	0	1	0	0	0	0	2	0	2	0	5
Scharf	0	0	2	2	1	0	0	1	0	1	7

=== Draw 8 ===
February 8, 7:30 PM

Sheet 3	1	2	3	4	5	6	7	8	9	10	Final
Macinnes 🔨	0	2	0	0	2	0	0	1	0	0	5
Jakubo	1	0	3	0	0	0	1	0	1	3	9

Sheet 4	1	2	3	4	5	6	7	8	9	10	Final
Jacobs	0	0	2	1	0	1	1	0	1	X	6
Burgess 🔨	0	2	0	0	0	0	0	2	0	X	4

Sheet 5	1	2	3	4	5	6	7	8	9	10	11	Final
Scharf 🔨	0	0	2	0	0	0	3	1	0	0	3	9
Assad	0	2	0	1	0	1	0	0	0	2	0	6

Sheet 6	1	2	3	4	5	6	7	8	9	10	Final
Gordon 🔨	1	0	0	0	0	1	0	2	0	1	5
Nordin	0	0	1	1	0	0	1	0	2	0	6

=== Draw 9 ===
February 9, 9:30 AM

Sheet 3	1	2	3	4	5	6	7	8	9	10	Final
Salo 🔨	3	0	1	1	0	1	0	0	1	0	7
Pozihun	0	2	0	0	2	0	2	1	0	2	9

Sheet 4	1	2	3	4	5	6	7	8	9	10	Final
Nordin	0	0	0	1	0	2	1	0	2	0	6
Scharf 🔨	0	3	0	0	1	0	0	3	0	1	8

Sheet 5	1	2	3	4	5	6	7	8	9	10	11	Final
Montpellier 🔨	0	2	1	0	2	1	0	0	0	1	0	7
Currie	0	0	0	2	0	0	3	1	1	0	1	8

Sheet 6	1	2	3	4	5	6	7	8	9	10	Final
MacInnes 🔨	0	0	0	1	0	X	X	X	X	X	1
Jacobs	2	3	0	0	2	X	X	X	X	X	7

=== Draw 10 ===
February 9, 2:30 PM

Sheet 3	1	2	3	4	5	6	7	8	9	10	Final
Scharf	0	1	0	1	0	0	1	0	2	X	5
Jacobs 🔨	1	0	0	0	2	0	0	0	0	X	3

Sheet 4	1	2	3	4	5	6	7	8	9	10	Final
Gordon	0	0	0	1	0	1	0	2	0	0	4
Jakubo 🔨	0	2	0	0	1	0	2	0	1	1	7

Sheet 5	1	2	3	4	5	6	7	8	9	10	Final
MacInnes 🔨	0	2	1	0	3	1	X	X	X	X	7
Nordin	0	0	0	1	0	0	X	X	X	X	1

Sheet 6	1	2	3	4	5	6	7	8	9	10	11	Final
Assad 🔨	1	1	0	2	0	1	0	0	0	2	0	7
Burgess	0	0	2	0	2	0	2	0	1	0	1	8

=== Draw 11 ===
February 9, 7:30 PM

Sheet 3	1	2	3	4	5	6	7	8	9	10	Final
Currie	0	1	0	0	2	0	1	0	3	0	7
Burgess 🔨	0	0	2	1	0	2	0	3	0	1	9

Sheet 4	1	2	3	4	5	6	7	8	9	10	Final
Montpellier 🔨	0	0	2	0	0	1	0	2	0	1	6
Assad	2	1	0	0	1	0	2	0	2	0	8

Sheet 5	1	2	3	4	5	6	7	8	9	10	Final
Pozihun	1	2	0	1	0	1	1	0	2	X	8
Gordon 🔨	0	0	1	0	2	0	0	1	0	X	4

Sheet 6	1	2	3	4	5	6	7	8	9	10	Final
Jakubo 🔨	0	0	0	2	2	0	0	0	0	1	5
Salo	0	0	2	0	0	1	1	2	1	0	7

=== Draw 12 ===
February 10, 9:30 AM

Sheet 3	1	2	3	4	5	6	7	8	9	10	Final
Nordin	0	0	1	2	0	0	1	0	0	X	4
Assad 🔨	2	3	0	0	1	1	0	1	0	X	8

Sheet 4	1	2	3	4	5	6	7	8	9	10	Final
Burgess 🔨	0	2	0	2	1	0	0	3	0	0	8
MacInnes	3	0	2	0	0	0	1	0	2	1	9

Sheet 5	1	2	3	4	5	6	7	8	9	10	Final
Jacobs 🔨	2	0	0	0	3	0	2	0	1	X	8
Jakubo	0	0	1	1	0	0	0	2	0	X	4

Sheet 6	1	2	3	4	5	6	7	8	9	10	11	Final
Scharf 🔨	1	0	0	0	1	0	0	2	0	0	0	4
Gordon	0	1	0	0	0	2	0	0	0	1	1	5

=== Draw 13 ===
February 10, 2:30 PM

Sheet 3	1	2	3	4	5	6	7	8	9	10	Final
Jakubo	1	0	2	0	1	0	2	1	X	X	7
Montpellier 🔨	0	1	0	1	0	0	0	0	X	X	2

Sheet 4	1	2	3	4	5	6	7	8	9	10	Final
Currie	0	2	0	2	0	0	0	1	X	X	5
Gordon 🔨	2	0	3	0	1	1	1	0	X	X	8

Sheet 5	1	2	3	4	5	6	7	8	9	10	Final
Assad 🔨	1	0	1	0	2	0	1	0	3	X	8
Salo	0	1	0	1	0	1	0	2	0	X	5

Sheet 6	1	2	3	4	5	6	7	8	9	10	Final
Burgess 🔨	0	2	0	1	0	2	0	0	2	0	7
Pozihun	0	0	1	0	4	0	1	1	0	1	8

=== Draw 14 ===
February 10, 7:30 PM

Sheet 3	1	2	3	4	5	6	7	8	9	10	Final
Pozihun	0	0	4	2	0	X	X	X	X	X	6
MacInnes 🔨	0	1	0	0	0	X	X	X	X	X	1

Sheet 4	1	2	3	4	5	6	7	8	9	10	Final
Salo 🔨	1	0	2	0	0	0	0	0	0	X	3
Nordin	0	2	0	1	0	1	1	0	0	X	5

Sheet 5	1	2	3	4	5	6	7	8	9	10	Final
Currie	2	1	0	1	0	4	0	1	X	X	9
Scharf 🔨	0	0	2	0	1	0	0	0	X	X	3

Sheet 6	1	2	3	4	5	6	7	8	9	10	Final
Jacobs	2	0	0	2	0	3	0	1	X	X	8
Montpellier 🔨	0	1	1	0	1	0	0	0	X	X	3

=== Draw 15 ===
February 11, 9:30 AM

Sheet 3	1	2	3	4	5	6	7	8	9	10	Final
Gordon 🔨	1	1	0	1	0	0	1	0	0	X	4
Salo	0	0	3	0	1	1	0	1	1	X	7

Sheet 4	1	2	3	4	5	6	7	8	9	10	11	Final
Jakubo 🔨	2	0	0	0	0	1	0	1	1	0	1	6
Pozihun	0	1	1	1	0	0	1	0	0	1	0	5

Sheet 5	1	2	3	4	5	6	7	8	9	10	Final
Burgess 🔨	1	0	0	0	2	0	0	2	0	X	5
Montpellier	0	4	2	1	0	1	1	0	0	X	9

Sheet 6	1	2	3	4	5	6	7	8	9	10	Final
Currie 🔨	0	1	0	0	2	0	1	0	X	X	4
Assad	0	0	2	2	0	3	0	1	X	X	8

=== Draw 16 ===
February 11, 2:30 PM

Sheet 3	1	2	3	4	5	6	7	8	9	10	Final
Jacobs 🔨	0	0	2	0	2	0	0	1	0	0	5
Currie	1	0	0	2	0	2	0	0	1	1	7

Sheet 4	1	2	3	4	5	6	7	8	9	10	Final
Scharf	0	0	0	1	1	0	0	3	1	X	6
Montpellier 🔨	0	1	0	0	0	0	2	0	0	X	3

Sheet 5	1	2	3	4	5	6	7	8	9	10	Final
Nordin	0	1	0	0	0	1	0	0	X	X	2
Pozihun 🔨	1	0	1	2	2	0	2	1	X	X	9

Sheet 6	1	2	3	4	5	6	7	8	9	10	11	Final
Salo	1	0	1	0	1	0	1	1	0	1	1	7
MacInnes 🔨	0	1	0	2	0	3	0	0	0	0	0	6

=== Draw 17 ===
February 7, 7:30 PM

Sheet 3	1	2	3	4	5	6	7	8	9	10	Final
Burgess 🔨	0	0	1	0	2	0	1	0	X	X	4
Scharf	0	0	0	2	0	4	0	1	X	X	7

Sheet 4	1	2	3	4	5	6	7	8	9	10	Final
Assad	2	0	1	1	0	1	0	0	1	0	6
Jacobs 🔨	0	1	0	0	1	0	2	2	0	1	7

Sheet 5	1	2	3	4	5	6	7	8	9	10	Final
Gordon 🔨	0	1	0	0	5	0	0	2	0	X	8
MacInnes	0	0	2	1	0	1	1	0	1	X	6

Sheet 6	1	2	3	4	5	6	7	8	9	10	Final
Nordin	0	0	0	1	0	X	X	X	X	X	1
Jakubo 🔨	3	1	4	0	0	X	X	X	X	X	8

=== TieBreaker ===
February 12, 9:30 AM

Sheet 5	1	2	3	4	5	6	7	8	9	10	Final
Assad	0	2	0	0	4	0	0	1	1	X	8
Pozihun 🔨	0	0	1	1	0	0	2	0	0	X	4

== Playoffs ==
Page playoff system
1	Joe Scharf	8
2	Brad Jacobs	4
3	Mike Jakubo	6
4	Mike Assad	7

Semifinal
2	Brad Jacobs	6
4	Mike Assad	1

Final
1	Joe Scharf	6
2	Brad Jacobs	7

=== 1 vs. 2 ===
February 12, 2:30 PM

Sheet 4	1	2	3	4	5	6	7	8	9	10	Final
Scharf 🔨	2	0	0	1	0	2	1	0	2	X	8
Jacobs	0	1	0	0	1	0	0	2	0	X	4

=== 3 vs. 4 ===
February 12, 7:30 PM

Sheet 4	1	2	3	4	5	6	7	8	9	10	Final
Jakubo	0	2	0	0	0	2	0	2	0	0	6
Assad 🔨	0	0	1	2	1	0	2	0	0	1	7

=== Semi-final ===
February 13, 9:00 AM

Sheet 4	1	2	3	4	5	6	7	8	9	10	Final
Jacobs 🔨	0	1	0	1	2	1	1	X	X	X	6
Assad	0	0	1	0	0	0	0	X	X	X	1

=== Final ===
February 13, 1:30 PM

Sheet 4	1	2	3	4	5	6	7	8	9	10	Final
Scharf 🔨	0	1	1	0	0	3	0	1	0	0	6
Jacobs	0	0	0	0	1	0	1	0	2	3	7
