= 2011 Tim Hortons Brier =

- Host city: London, Ontario
- Arena: John Labatt Centre
- Dates: March 5–13
- Attendance: 113,626
- Winner: Manitoba
- Curling club: Charleswood Curling Club
- Skip: Jeff Stoughton
- Third: Jon Mead
- Second: Reid Carruthers
- Lead: Steve Gould
- Alternate: Garth Smith
- Coach: Norm Gould
- Finalist: Ontario (Glenn Howard)

The 2011 Tim Hortons Brier, the Canadian men's national curling championship, was held March 5 until March 13, 2011, at the John Labatt Centre in London, Ontario. This event marked the 30th time that the province of Ontario has hosted the Brier since it began in 1927 in Toronto, Ontario and the first time a Bronze Medal Game was added to the playoffs.

In the final, Manitoba's Jeff Stoughton defeated Ontario's Glenn Howard 8–6. Team Manitoba were nearly perfect in the game, curling a record 96%. The team led 4–2 after 5, and stole two points in the sixth to take a 6–2 lead, after Howard was light on a draw. Stoughton's win was the first win for Manitoba in 12 years, when he last won the event, and was the 27th title for the province. A total of 8,261 spectators were on hand to watch the final. Team Stoughton went on to represent Canada at the 2011 World Men's Curling Championship, where they won the gold medal.

== Teams ==
For the second straight year, the defending champion was missing from the Brier. Kevin Koe's Brier champion and World champion rink lost in the Alberta provincial final to Kevin Martin's reigning Olympic champion rink, who played in his 11th Brier.

Representing Manitoba was the former world champion Jeff Stoughton rink, who has represented Manitoba in 5 of the last 6 years. He defeated the Mike McEwen rink, who at the time was ranked #1 in the CTRS, in the Manitoba provincial final.

Returning from Ontario was the former world champion Glenn Howard rink, who has won a record six straight provincial championships.

Returning from Newfoundland and Labrador was the former Olympic champion Brad Gushue, who has won eight of the last nine provincial championships. The Gushue rink was fresh off a break up with Albertan Randy Ferbey who skipped the team in a few World Curling Tour events this season.

The 2005 Brier runner-up Shawn Adams skipped for Team Nova Scotia.

Representing Saskatchewan was Steve Laycock, who made his Brier skipping debut with Pat Simmons as fourth, while looking to win the 4th national title of the year for Saskatchewan, following two Canadian Junior titles and one Scotties title.

The 2010 Brier bronze medalist Brad Jacobs represented Northern Ontario once again.

Jim Cotter skipped Team British Columbia for the first time, taking over the position for an injured Bob Ursel.

The 1997 & 2002 Brier bronze medallist James Grattan represented New Brunswick for a 9th time. His second, Steve Howard, is Glenn Howard's nephew.

Jamie Koe returned to play in his fifth Brier representing the Northwest Territories/Yukon team, hoping to improve on his last place finish in 2010.

Playing in his first Brier since 1994 was Prince Edward Island's Eddie MacKenzie who was also skipping for the first time.

And finally, François Gagné of Quebec played in his first Brier after upsetting former Brier champion Jean-Michel Ménard in the Quebec provincial final.

Alberta	British Columbia	Manitoba
Saville SC, Edmonton Skip: Kevin Martin; Third: John Morris; Second: Marc Kennedy; Lead: Ben Hebert; Alternate: Dustin Eckstrand	Kelowna CC, Kelowna Skip: Jim Cotter; Third: Ken Maskiewich; Second: Kevin Folk; Lead: Rick Sawatsky; Alternate: Brad Wood	Charleswood CC, Winnipeg Skip: Jeff Stoughton; Third: Jon Mead; Second: Reid Carruthers; Lead: Steve Gould; Alternate: Garth Smith
New Brunswick	Newfoundland and Labrador	Northern Ontario
Gage G&CC, Oromocto Skip: James Grattan; Third: Charles Sullivan; Second: Steve Howard; Lead: Peter Case; Alternate: Paul Nason	Bally Haly G&CC, St. John's Skip: Brad Gushue; Third: Mark Nichols; Second: Ryan Fry; Lead: Jamie Danbrook; Alternate: Andrew Symonds	Soo CA, Sault Ste. Marie Skip: Brad Jacobs; Third: E. J. Harnden; Second: Ryan Harnden; Lead: Scott Seabrook; Alternate: Matt Dumontelle
Nova Scotia	Ontario	Prince Edward Island
Mayflower CC, Halifax Skip: Shawn Adams; Third: Paul Flemming; Second: Andrew Gibson; Lead: Kelly Mittelstadt; Alternate: Craig Burgess	Coldwater & District CC, Coldwater Skip: Glenn Howard; Third: Richard Hart; Second: Brent Laing; Lead: Craig Savill; Alternate: Scott Howard	Charlottetown CC, Charlottetown Skip: Eddie MacKenzie; Third: Mike Gaudet; Second: Mike Dillon; Lead: Alex MacFadyen; Alternate: Jamie Newson
Quebec	Saskatchewan	Yukon/Northwest Territories
CC Chicoutimi, Chicoutimi; TMR CC, Mount Royal Skip: François Gagné; Third: Robert Desjardins; Second: Christian Bouchard; Lead: Philippe Ménard; Alternate: Jean-François Charest	Tartan CC, Regina Fourth: Pat Simmons; Skip: Steve Laycock; Second: Brennen Jones; Lead: Dallan Muyres; Alternate: Kelly Knapp	Yellowknife CC, Yellowknife Skip: Jamie Koe; Third: Tom Naugler; Second: Brad Chorostkowski; Lead: Martin Gavin; Alternate: Colin Miller

== Map of teams ==
Provincial Winners

== Round robin standings ==
Final Round Robin Standings

Key
Teams to Playoffs

Locale	Skip	W	L	PF	PA	EW	EL	BE	SE	S%
Newfoundland and Labrador (Note: Newfoundland and Labrador finished first by virtue of their wins over Manitoba and Alberta.)	Brad Gushue	9	2	78	51	47	37	15	13	84%
Manitoba (Note: Manitoba finished second by virtue of their win over Alberta.)	Jeff Stoughton	9	2	83	41	40	36	18	7	87%
Alberta	Kevin Martin	9	2	75	52	47	33	11	15	86%
Ontario	Glenn Howard	8	3	82	39	43	29	21	13	88%
Northern Ontario	Brad Jacobs	7	4	68	59	47	38	18	9	82%
Nova Scotia	Shawn Adams	5	6	71	72	44	42	9	9	80%
British Columbia	Jim Cotter	4	7	58	68	41	47	11	7	80%
Saskatchewan	Steve Laycock	4	7	59	76	46	48	11	9	82%
New Brunswick	James Grattan	4	7	59	70	43	46	19	6	79%
Quebec	François Gagné	3	8	74	78	43	49	10	6	79%
Northwest Territories/Yukon	Jamie Koe	3	8	55	88	38	53	6	5	75%
Prince Edward Island	Eddie MacKenzie	1	10	38	100	32	48	6	7	74%

== Results ==
All draw times are listed in Eastern Standard Time (UTC−5).

=== Draw 1 ===
Saturday, March 5, 2:30 pm

Sheet A	1	2	3	4	5	6	7	8	9	10	Final
Saskatchewan (Laycock) 🔨	1	0	1	0	1	1	1	0	1	X	6
Northwest Territories/Yukon (Koe)	0	2	0	1	0	0	0	1	0	X	4

Sheet B	1	2	3	4	5	6	7	8	9	10	Final
New Brunswick (Grattan)	0	0	1	0	1	0	0	0	1	2	5
Ontario (Howard) 🔨	1	0	0	1	0	0	0	2	0	0	4

Sheet C	1	2	3	4	5	6	7	8	9	10	Final
Newfoundland and Labrador (Gushue) 🔨	1	0	5	1	2	1	2	X	X	X	12
Prince Edward Island (MacKenzie)	0	1	0	0	0	0	0	X	X	X	1

Sheet D	1	2	3	4	5	6	7	8	9	10	Final
Manitoba (Stoughton) 🔨	2	1	0	3	0	4	0	X	X	X	10
British Columbia (Cotter)	0	0	1	0	2	0	1	X	X	X	4

=== Draw 2 ===
Saturday, March 5, 7:30 pm

Sheet A	1	2	3	4	5	6	7	8	9	10	Final
Manitoba (Stoughton)	0	0	2	0	3	0	0	0	4	X	9
New Brunswick (Grattan) 🔨	2	0	0	1	0	1	0	0	0	X	4

Sheet B	1	2	3	4	5	6	7	8	9	10	Final
Nova Scotia (Adams) 🔨	0	1	0	2	0	0	1	0	0	X	4
Quebec (Gagné)	1	0	2	0	0	4	0	1	2	X	10

Sheet C	1	2	3	4	5	6	7	8	9	10	Final
Northern Ontario (Jacobs)	0	0	1	0	0	0	0	1	0	X	2
Alberta (Martin) 🔨	1	0	0	1	1	2	1	0	0	X	6

Sheet D	1	2	3	4	5	6	7	8	9	10	Final
Prince Edward Island (MacKenzie)	1	0	0	1	0	1	0	0	2	1	6
Northwest Territories/Yukon (Koe) 🔨	0	0	3	0	3	0	2	0	0	0	8

=== Draw 3 ===
Sunday, March 6, 9:30 am

Sheet A	1	2	3	4	5	6	7	8	9	10	Final
Quebec (Gagné) 🔨	3	1	0	0	0	2	0	4	X	X	10
Prince Edward Island (MacKenzie)	0	0	0	1	1	0	1	0	X	X	3

Sheet B	1	2	3	4	5	6	7	8	9	10	Final
Northwest Territories/Yukon (Koe)	0	0	2	4	0	1	0	1	0	0	8
Northern Ontario (Jacobs) 🔨	1	3	0	0	2	0	1	0	2	2	11

Sheet C	1	2	3	4	5	6	7	8	9	10	Final
Nova Scotia (Adams)	0	0	1	0	1	0	1	0	X	X	3
Manitoba (Stoughton) 🔨	1	1	0	3	0	2	0	1	X	X	8

Sheet D	1	2	3	4	5	6	7	8	9	10	Final
Alberta (Martin) 🔨	0	0	2	0	1	0	2	2	0	1	8
New Brunswick (Grattan)	2	1	0	1	0	1	0	0	1	0	6

=== Draw 4 ===
Sunday, March 6, 2:30 pm

Sheet A	1	2	3	4	5	6	7	8	9	10	Final
Ontario (Howard) 🔨	1	0	0	1	0	3	0	0	2	X	7
Nova Scotia (Adams)	0	0	0	0	3	0	0	1	0	X	4

Sheet B	1	2	3	4	5	6	7	8	9	10	Final
British Columbia (Cotter)	0	0	0	0	1	1	0	X	X	X	2
Alberta (Martin) 🔨	0	1	2	2	0	0	3	X	X	X	8

Sheet C	1	2	3	4	5	6	7	8	9	10	11	Final
Saskatchewan (Laycock)	0	1	2	0	2	0	0	2	0	0	1	8
Quebec (Gagné) 🔨	2	0	0	0	0	1	1	0	2	1	0	7

Sheet D	1	2	3	4	5	6	7	8	9	10	11	Final
Northern Ontario (Jacobs)	1	0	1	0	1	0	1	0	0	1	0	5
Newfoundland and Labrador (Gushue) 🔨	0	1	0	1	0	1	0	2	0	0	2	7

=== Draw 5 ===
Sunday, March 6, 7:30 pm

Sheet A	1	2	3	4	5	6	7	8	9	10	Final
British Columbia (Cotter)	1	2	0	0	0	0	0	2	0	1	6
Newfoundland and Labrador (Gushue) 🔨	0	0	0	1	1	1	1	0	1	0	5

Sheet B	1	2	3	4	5	6	7	8	9	10	Final
Prince Edward Island (MacKenzie)	0	1	1	0	1	0	1	X	X	X	4
Manitoba (Stoughton) 🔨	2	0	0	5	0	2	0	X	X	X	9

Sheet C	1	2	3	4	5	6	7	8	9	10	11	Final
New Brunswick (Grattan)	0	2	0	2	0	0	2	0	0	1	0	7
Northwest Territories/Yukon (Koe) 🔨	3	0	1	0	1	0	0	0	2	0	1	8

Sheet D	1	2	3	4	5	6	7	8	9	10	Final
Ontario (Howard) 🔨	0	2	0	3	0	0	4	1	X	X	10
Saskatchewan (Laycock)	1	0	1	0	1	0	0	0	X	X	3

=== Draw 6 ===
Monday, March 7, 9:30 am

Sheet B	1	2	3	4	5	6	7	8	9	10	Final
Saskatchewan (Laycock)	0	2	0	1	0	1	0	0	1	1	6
Newfoundland and Labrador (Gushue) 🔨	1	0	3	0	2	0	1	0	0	0	7

Sheet C	1	2	3	4	5	6	7	8	9	10	Final
Ontario (Howard)	0	3	0	1	0	0	1	1	0	1	7
British Columbia (Cotter) 🔨	1	0	1	0	0	2	0	0	1	0	5

=== Draw 7 ===
Monday, March 7, 2:30 pm

Sheet A	1	2	3	4	5	6	7	8	9	10	Final
Prince Edward Island (MacKenzie) 🔨	0	1	0	0	1	0	0	X	X	X	2
Alberta (Martin)	2	0	2	1	0	3	1	X	X	X	9

Sheet B	1	2	3	4	5	6	7	8	9	10	Final
Quebec (Gagné) 🔨	0	0	1	0	2	0	1	0	1	0	5
New Brunswick (Grattan)	0	1	0	1	0	2	0	2	0	1	7

Sheet C	1	2	3	4	5	6	7	8	9	10	Final
Manitoba (Stoughton) 🔨	2	0	0	1	0	0	3	0	2	X	8
Northern Ontario (Jacobs)	0	1	1	0	1	0	0	1	0	X	4

Sheet D	1	2	3	4	5	6	7	8	9	10	Final
Northwest Territories/Yukon (Koe)	0	0	1	0	0	1	0	X	X	X	2
Nova Scotia (Adams) 🔨	3	2	0	1	2	0	1	X	X	X	9

=== Draw 8 ===
Monday, March 7, 7:30 pm

Sheet A	1	2	3	4	5	6	7	8	9	10	Final
Quebec (Gagné)	0	1	0	2	0	1	0	X	X	X	4
Ontario (Howard) 🔨	2	0	3	0	3	0	4	X	X	X	12

Sheet B	1	2	3	4	5	6	7	8	9	10	Final
Northern Ontario (Jacobs)	0	3	0	1	0	0	1	1	1	X	7
British Columbia (Cotter) 🔨	2	0	1	0	2	0	0	0	0	X	5

Sheet C	1	2	3	4	5	6	7	8	9	10	Final
Nova Scotia (Adams)	0	1	0	2	0	1	1	0	1	1	7
Saskatchewan (Laycock) 🔨	1	0	3	0	1	0	0	1	0	0	6

Sheet D	1	2	3	4	5	6	7	8	9	10	Final
Newfoundland and Labrador (Gushue) 🔨	1	2	1	0	0	2	0	3	X	X	9
Alberta (Martin)	0	0	0	0	2	0	2	0	X	X	4

=== Draw 9 ===
Tuesday, March 8, 9:30 am

Sheet A	1	2	3	4	5	6	7	8	9	10	Final
Manitoba (Stoughton)	0	1	0	2	2	2	0	3	X	X	10
Northwest Territories/Yukon (Koe) 🔨	2	0	1	0	0	0	1	0	X	X	4

Sheet B	1	2	3	4	5	6	7	8	9	10	Final
Alberta (Martin)	0	2	0	2	0	1	1	0	3	X	9
Nova Scotia (Adams) 🔨	3	0	1	0	2	0	0	1	0	X	7

Sheet C	1	2	3	4	5	6	7	8	9	10	Final
Prince Edward Island (MacKenzie) 🔨	1	0	2	1	1	0	2	0	0	1	8
New Brunswick (Grattan)	0	1	0	0	0	1	0	2	1	0	5

Sheet D	1	2	3	4	5	6	7	8	9	10	Final
Quebec (Gagné)	0	0	0	1	0	2	0	2	0	X	5
Northern Ontario (Jacobs) 🔨	2	0	2	0	2	0	1	0	1	X	8

=== Draw 10 ===
Tuesday, March 8, 2:30 pm

Sheet A	1	2	3	4	5	6	7	8	9	10	Final
Nova Scotia (Adams)	3	0	0	1	1	0	3	0	2	X	10
Northern Ontario (Jacobs) 🔨	0	1	1	0	0	2	0	1	0	X	5

Sheet B	1	2	3	4	5	6	7	8	9	10	Final
Newfoundland and Labrador (Gushue) 🔨	0	0	0	0	0	0	1	0	X	X	1
Ontario (Howard)	0	0	0	1	2	0	0	3	X	X	6

Sheet C	1	2	3	4	5	6	7	8	9	10	Final
Quebec (Gagné)	0	0	2	0	0	2	0	0	1	0	5
Alberta (Martin) 🔨	0	1	0	1	2	0	2	1	0	0	7

Sheet D	1	2	3	4	5	6	7	8	9	10	Final
Saskatchewan (Laycock) 🔨	1	0	0	1	0	0	1	1	0	2	6
British Columbia (Cotter)	0	0	1	0	1	1	0	0	1	0	4

=== Draw 11 ===
Tuesday, March 8, 7:30 pm

Sheet A	1	2	3	4	5	6	7	8	9	10	Final
New Brunswick (Grattan)	0	0	1	0	1	0	2	0	1	0	5
British Columbia (Cotter) 🔨	0	0	0	2	0	1	0	3	0	1	7

Sheet B	1	2	3	4	5	6	7	8	9	10	Final
Prince Edward Island (MacKenzie)	0	1	1	0	0	2	0	0	2	1	7
Saskatchewan (Laycock) 🔨	2	0	0	3	1	0	1	1	0	0	8

Sheet C	1	2	3	4	5	6	7	8	9	10	Final
Northwest Territories/Yukon (Koe)	0	0	1	0	2	0	0	0	X	X	3
Newfoundland and Labrador (Gushue) 🔨	1	0	0	1	0	2	1	3	X	X	8

Sheet D	1	2	3	4	5	6	7	8	9	10	Final
Ontario (Howard) 🔨	0	0	2	2	0	0	1	0	2	X	7
Manitoba (Stoughton)	0	0	0	0	0	2	0	2	0	X	4

=== Draw 12 ===
Wednesday, March 9, 9:30 am

Sheet A	1	2	3	4	5	6	7	8	9	10	Final
Alberta (Martin)	2	0	3	0	4	0	2	X	X	X	11
Saskatchewan (Laycock) 🔨	0	0	0	2	0	1	0	X	X	X	3

Sheet B	1	2	3	4	5	6	7	8	9	10	11	Final
British Columbia (Cotter) 🔨	1	0	3	1	0	1	0	1	0	0	1	8
Quebec (Gagné)	0	1	0	0	3	0	2	0	0	1	0	7

Sheet C	1	2	3	4	5	6	7	8	9	10	11	Final
Northern Ontario (Jacobs) 🔨	0	1	0	0	0	1	0	2	0	0	1	5
Ontario (Howard)	0	0	1	0	0	0	2	0	0	1	0	4

Sheet D	1	2	3	4	5	6	7	8	9	10	Final
Nova Scotia (Adams)	0	1	0	1	0	1	0	X	X	X	3
Newfoundland and Labrador (Gushue) 🔨	0	0	3	0	3	0	3	X	X	X	9

=== Draw 13 ===
Wednesday, March 9, 2:30 pm

Sheet A	1	2	3	4	5	6	7	8	9	10	Final
Ontario (Howard)	3	3	0	2	3	X	X	X	X	X	11
Prince Edward Island (MacKenzie) 🔨	0	0	1	0	0	X	X	X	X	X	1

Team P.E.I. was fined $2000 for quitting the game before the 7th end.

Sheet B	1	2	3	4	5	6	7	8	9	10	Final
New Brunswick (Grattan)	0	1	0	0	1	0	1	0	1	1	5
Newfoundland and Labrador (Gushue) 🔨	1	0	0	2	0	1	0	2	0	0	6

Sheet C	1	2	3	4	5	6	7	8	9	10	11	Final
Saskatchewan (Laycock) 🔨	2	0	1	0	0	2	0	0	0	1	0	6
Manitoba (Stoughton)	0	1	0	0	1	0	2	2	0	0	1	7

Sheet D	1	2	3	4	5	6	7	8	9	10	Final
British Columbia (Cotter) 🔨	1	0	2	0	1	0	0	0	1	0	5
Northwest Territories/Yukon (Koe)	0	1	0	1	0	1	1	1	0	1	6

=== Draw 14 ===
Wednesday, March 9, 7:30 pm

Sheet A	1	2	3	4	5	6	7	8	9	10	Final
Northwest Territories/Yukon (Koe)	0	1	0	1	1	0	1	0	X	X	4
Quebec (Gagné) 🔨	1	0	4	0	0	3	0	2	X	X	10

Sheet B	1	2	3	4	5	6	7	8	9	10	Final
Manitoba (Stoughton) 🔨	0	1	2	0	0	0	2	X	X	X	5
Alberta (Martin)	0	0	0	0	0	1	0	X	X	X	1

Sheet C	1	2	3	4	5	6	7	8	9	10	Final
New Brunswick (Grattan)	3	0	1	0	2	0	0	2	0	0	8
Nova Scotia (Adams) 🔨	0	1	0	1	0	2	0	0	1	0	5

Sheet D	1	2	3	4	5	6	7	8	9	10	Final
Northern Ontario (Jacobs)	0	3	1	0	0	3	0	2	X	X	9
Prince Edward Island (MacKenzie) 🔨	0	0	0	0	1	0	1	0	X	X	2

=== Draw 15 ===
Thursday, March 10, 9:30 am

Sheet A	1	2	3	4	5	6	7	8	9	10	Final
Newfoundland and Labrador (Gushue)	0	1	0	2	0	0	0	3	0	2	8
Manitoba (Stoughton) 🔨	0	0	3	0	0	2	0	0	0	0	5

Sheet B	1	2	3	4	5	6	7	8	9	10	Final
Ontario (Howard) 🔨	2	3	1	0	2	1	0	X	X	X	9
Northwest Territories/Yukon (Koe)	0	0	0	1	0	0	1	X	X	X	2

Sheet C	1	2	3	4	5	6	7	8	9	10	Final
British Columbia (Cotter) 🔨	1	1	0	2	0	1	2	X	X	X	7
Prince Edward Island (MacKenzie)	0	0	1	0	0	0	0	X	X	X	1

Sheet D	1	2	3	4	5	6	7	8	9	10	Final
New Brunswick (Grattan) 🔨	2	0	1	0	1	0	0	0	0	2	6
Saskatchewan (Laycock)	0	1	0	1	0	1	0	1	0	0	4

=== Draw 16 ===
Thursday, March 10, 2:30 pm

Sheet A	1	2	3	4	5	6	7	8	9	10	Final
Northern Ontario (Jacobs) 🔨	0	0	1	0	2	0	2	1	X	X	6
New Brunswick (Grattan)	0	0	0	1	0	0	0	0	X	X	1

Sheet B	1	2	3	4	5	6	7	8	9	10	Final
Nova Scotia (Adams) 🔨	1	0	4	0	3	3	1	X	X	X	12
Prince Edward Island (MacKenzie)	0	2	0	1	0	0	0	X	X	X	3

Sheet C	1	2	3	4	5	6	7	8	9	10	Final
Alberta (Martin) 🔨	2	1	0	1	0	1	0	0	0	2	7
Northwest Territories/Yukon (Koe)	0	0	2	0	2	0	0	1	1	0	6

Sheet D	1	2	3	4	5	6	7	8	9	10	Final
Manitoba (Stoughton)	0	1	0	3	0	0	0	2	2	X	8
Quebec (Gagné) 🔨	1	0	2	0	0	1	0	0	0	X	4

=== Draw 17 ===
Thursday, March 10, 7:30 pm

Sheet A	1	2	3	4	5	6	7	8	9	10	Final
British Columbia (Cotter) 🔨	0	0	0	1	0	1	0	2	0	1	5
Nova Scotia (Adams)	0	1	0	0	1	0	2	0	2	0	6

Sheet B	1	2	3	4	5	6	7	8	9	10	Final
Saskatchewan (Laycock)	0	0	1	0	1	0	1	0	0	X	3
Northern Ontario (Jacobs) 🔨	2	0	0	2	0	1	0	1	0	X	6

Sheet C	1	2	3	4	5	6	7	8	9	10	Final
Newfoundland and Labrador (Gushue)	0	2	0	4	0	1	0	1	0	1	9
Quebec (Gagné) 🔨	2	0	1	0	1	0	1	0	2	0	7

Sheet D	1	2	3	4	5	6	7	8	9	10	Final
Alberta (Martin) 🔨	2	0	2	0	0	0	0	1	0	1	6
Ontario (Howard)	0	1	0	1	1	0	0	0	2	0	5

== Playoffs ==
Page playoffs
1	Newfoundland and Labrador	6
2	Manitoba	7
3	Alberta	4
4	Ontario	5

Semifinal
1	Newfoundland and Labrador	6
4	Ontario	7

Final
2	Manitoba	8
4	Ontario	6

Bronze Medal Game
3	Alberta	5
1	Newfoundland and Labrador	10

=== 1 vs. 2 ===
Friday, March 11, 7:30 pm

Sheet C	1	2	3	4	5	6	7	8	9	10	11	Final
Newfoundland and Labrador (Gushue) 🔨	1	0	2	0	0	0	2	0	0	1	0	6
Manitoba (Stoughton)	0	1	0	0	1	1	0	2	1	0	1	7

Player percentages
Newfoundland and Labrador		Manitoba	
Jamie Danbrook	90%	Steve Gould	90%
Ryan Fry	85%	Reid Carruthers	86%
Mark Nichols	69%	Jon Mead	94%
Brad Gushue	72%	Jeff Stoughton	89%
Total	79%	Total	90%

=== 3 vs. 4 ===
Saturday, March 12, 2:30 pm

In the 9th end, Alberta and Ontario's rocks were so close to the tee (the pin hole), that a measurement could not be made, and the umpire ( Keith Reilly 1967 Brier Champion from Ontario ) had to make a call. While Alberta scored the point, Ontario scored two in the 10th to win when Martin missed his last shot, a raise attempt against two, giving Ontario the victory with Howard not having to throw his last.

Sheet C	1	2	3	4	5	6	7	8	9	10	Final
Alberta (Martin) 🔨	1	0	0	1	0	0	0	1	1	0	4
Ontario (Howard)	0	1	0	0	2	0	0	0	0	2	5

Player percentages
Alberta		Ontario	
Ben Hebert	90%	Craig Savill	94%
Marc Kennedy	93%	Brent Laing	91%
John Morris	81%	Richard Hart	95%
Kevin Martin	85%	Glenn Howard	76%
Total	87%	Total	89%

=== Semifinal ===
Saturday, March 12, 7:30 pm

Sheet C	1	2	3	4	5	6	7	8	9	10	Final
Newfoundland and Labrador (Gushue) 🔨	1	0	0	2	0	1	0	0	2	0	6
Ontario (Howard)	0	0	2	0	2	0	2	0	0	1	7

Player percentages
Newfoundland and Labrador		Ontario	
Jamie Danbrook	98%	Craig Savill	100%
Ryan Fry	84%	Brent Laing	94%
Mark Nichols	88%	Richard Hart	94%
Brad Gushue	86%	Glenn Howard	86%
Total	89%	Total	93%

=== Bronze medal game ===
Sunday, March 13, 2:30 pm

Sheet C	1	2	3	4	5	6	7	8	9	10	Final
Alberta (Martin)	0	1	0	2	0	0	2	0	X	X	5
Newfoundland and Labrador (Gushue) 🔨	1	0	2	0	2	1	0	4	X	X	10

Player percentages
Newfoundland and Labrador		Alberta	
Jamie Danbrook	94%	Dustin Eckstrand	88%
Ryan Fry	89%	Ben Hebert	78%
Mark Nichols	88%	John Morris	92%
Brad Gushue	86%	Kevin Martin	69%
Total	89%	Total	82%

=== Final ===
Sunday, March 13, 7:30 pm

Sheet C	1	2	3	4	5	6	7	8	9	10	Final
Manitoba (Stoughton) 🔨	0	2	0	0	2	2	0	2	0	X	8
Ontario (Howard)	0	0	1	1	0	0	2	0	2	X	6

Player percentages
Manitoba		Ontario	
Steve Gould	99%	Craig Savill	99%
Reid Carruthers	98%	Brent Laing	90%
Jon Mead	94%	Richard Hart	90%
Jeff Stoughton	93%	Glenn Howard	87%
Total	96%	Total	91%

2011 Tim Hortons Brier
(Manitoba)
Manitoba
27th title

== Statistics ==
=== Top 5 player percentages ===
Round Robin only

Leads	%
(Alberta) Ben Hebert	92
(Ontario) Craig Savill	90
(Manitoba) Steve Gould	89
(Saskatchewan) Dallan Muyres	88
(Newfoundland and Labrador) Jamie Danbrook	85

Seconds	%
(Alberta) Marc Kennedy	90
(Manitoba) Reid Carruthers	87
(Newfoundland and Labrador) Ryan Fry	86
(Ontario) Brent Laing	86
(Saskatchewan) Brennen Jones	85

Thirds	%
(Manitoba) Jon Mead	87
(Ontario) Richard Hart	87
(Alberta) John Morris	82
(Northern Ontario) E. J. Harnden	81
(Newfoundland and Labrador) Mark Nichols	81

Skips	%
(Ontario) Glenn Howard	87
(Newfoundland and Labrador) Brad Gushue	84
(Manitoba) Jeff Stoughton	84
(Northern Ontario) Brad Jacobs	83
(Alberta) Kevin Martin	80

== Awards and honours ==
All-Star Teams

First Team

- Skip: Glenn Howard (Ontario)
- Third: Jon Mead (Manitoba)
- Second: Marc Kennedy (Alberta)
- Lead: Ben Hebert (Alberta)

Second Team

- Skip: Jeff Stoughton (Manitoba)
- Third: Richard Hart (Ontario)
- Second: Brent Laing (Ontario)
- Lead: Craig Savill (Ontario)

Ross Harstone Award

- Jim Cotter (British Columbia)

Scotty Harper Award – Media Award

- Jim Henderson, SWEEP Magazine (third win) – $500 award

Paul McLean Award

- Michael Burns Jr., CCA photographer

== Provincial and territorial playdowns ==
- 2011 Boston Pizza Cup (Alberta)
- (British Columbia) 2011 Canadian Direct Insurance BC Men's Curling Championship
- 2011 Safeway Championship (Manitoba)
- (New Brunswick) 2011 Molson Canadian Men's Provincial Curling Championship
- 2011 Newfoundland and Labrador Tankard
- The Dominion 2011 Northern Ontario Men's Curling Championship
- 2011 Nova Scotia Men's Molson Provincial Championship
- 2011 The Dominion Tankard (Ontario)
- (Prince Edward Island) 2011 PEI Labatt Tankard
- 2011 Quebec Men's Provincial Curling Championship
- 2011 SaskTel Tankard (Saskatchewan)
- (Northwest Territories) 2011 Yukon/NWT Men's Curling Championship
