= 2009 Canadian Junior Curling Championships =

The 2009 M&M Meat Shops Canadian Junior Curling Championships was held January 31-February 8 at the Sunwave Centre and the Salmon Arm Curling Club in Salmon Arm, British Columbia. The winning teams of Prince Edward Island's Brett Gallant in the men's event and Manitoba's Kaitlyn Lawes in the women's event would go on to represent Canada at the 2009 World Junior Curling Championships in Vancouver.

== Men's ==
=== Teams ===
Province / Territory	Skip	Third	Second	Lead
Alberta	Kevin Yablonski	Michael Ng	Brad Benini	Derek Clark
British Columbia	Bryan Kedziora	Derek Errington	Cal Jackson	Tyler MacKenzie
Manitoba	Sam Good	Taylor McIntyre	Kent Moffitt	David Wiebe
New Brunswick	Stephen Burgess	Jon Rennie (skip)	Robbie Doherty	Kevin Brayshaw
Newfoundland and Labrador	Cory Schuh	Kevin Schuh (skip)	Scott Eaton	Steve Moss
Northern Ontario	Dylan Johnston	Cody Johnston	Michael Makela	Mike Badiuk
Nova Scotia	Paul Dexter	Robby McLean	Alex MacFadyen	Josh MacInnis
Northwest Territories	Colin Miller	Rob Heimbach	John Murray	David Aho
Ontario	Bowie Abbis-Mills	Scott McGregor	Scott Hindle	Terry Arnold
Prince Edward Island	Brett Gallant	Adam Casey	Anson Carmody	Jamie Danbrook
Quebec	Andrew Leigh	Benoit Vezeau	Mathieu Westphal	Brad Hamelin
Saskatchewan	Mike Armstrong	Tyler Lang	Tyson Armstrong	Jordan Raymond
Yukon	Thomas Scoffin	Will Mahoney	Nick Koltun	Mitch Young

=== Standings ===
Locale	Skip	W	L
Northern Ontario	Dylan Johnston	9	3
Prince Edward Island	Brett Gallant	9	3
Alberta	Kevin Yablonski	8	4
New Brunswick	Jon Rennie	7	5
British Columbia	Bryan Kedziora	6	6
Manitoba	Sam Good	6	6
Newfoundland and Labrador	Kelly Schuh	6	6
Ontario	Bowie Abbis-Mills	6	6
Quebec	Andrew Leigh	6	6
Saskatchewan	Mike Armstrong	6	6
Nova Scotia	Paul Dexter	4	8
Yukon	Thomas Scoffin	3	9
Northwest Territories	Colin Miller	2	10

=== Results ===
==== Draw 1 ====
Sheet B	1	2	3	4	5	6	7	8	9	10	Final
Ontario (Abbis-Mills)	0	0	0	4	0	2	0	0	1	0	7
Northern Ontario (Johnston) 🔨	0	0	2	0	2	0	0	2	0	3	9

Sheet D	1	2	3	4	5	6	7	8	9	10	11	Final
Prince Edward Island (Gallant)	1	0	0	0	3	0	1	0	0	1	0	6
Saskatchewan (Armstrong) 🔨	0	2	1	1	0	1	0	1	0	0	1	7

Sheet E	1	2	3	4	5	6	7	8	9	10	Final
New Brunswick (Burgess) 🔨	2	2	1	0	2	0	0	0	1	X	8
Northwest Territories (Miller)	0	0	0	1	0	2	1	0	0	X	4

Sheet J	1	2	3	4	5	6	7	8	9	10	Final
Quebec (Leigh)	0	0	0	1	1	0	0	1	0	X	3
Alberta (Yablonski) 🔨	1	0	0	0	0	1	2	0	4	X	8

==== Draw 2 ====
Sheet B	1	2	3	4	5	6	7	8	9	10	Final
Saskatchewan (Armstrong) 🔨	1	2	0	2	0	0	1	1	1	1	9
Nova Scotia (Dexter)	0	0	2	0	4	1	0	0	0	0	7

Sheet C	1	2	3	4	5	6	7	8	9	10	Final
British Columbia (Kedziora) 🔨	1	0	1	0	1	0	0	0	0	X	3
Prince Edward Island (Gallant)	0	2	0	1	0	1	2	0	2	X	8

Sheet F	1	2	3	4	5	6	7	8	9	10	Final
Newfoundland and Labrador (Schuh)	0	0	1	0	1	0	0	X	X	X	2
Manitoba (Good) 🔨	2	1	0	1	0	3	1	X	X	X	8

Sheet H	1	2	3	4	5	6	7	8	9	10	Final
Yukon (Scoffin)	0	0	0	0	0	0	0	0	X	X	0
Northern Ontario (Johnston) 🔨	0	0	0	3	0	2	1	2	X	X	8

==== Draw 3 ====
Sheet B	1	2	3	4	5	6	7	8	9	10	Final
Quebec (Leigh)	0	3	0	2	0	4	1	X	X	X	10
Manitoba (Good) 🔨	0	0	1	0	2	0	0	X	X	X	3

Sheet C	1	2	3	4	5	6	7	8	9	10	Final
Newfoundland and Labrador (Schuh) 🔨	0	2	0	0	2	0	0	0	1	1	6
Yukon (Scoffin)	0	0	0	1	0	1	1	1	0	0	4

Sheet F	1	2	3	4	5	6	7	8	9	10	Final
Nova Scotia (Dexter) 🔨	1	0	0	3	2	2	0	0	0	X	8
Northwest Territories (Miller)	0	0	0	0	0	0	0	3	0	X	3

Sheet H	1	2	3	4	5	6	7	8	9	10	Final
Ontario (Abbis-Mills) 🔨	0	0	0	2	1	0	0	1	0	X	4
New Brunswick (Burgess)	0	0	1	0	0	3	1	0	2	X	7

Sheet I	1	2	3	4	5	6	7	8	9	10	Final
Alberta (Yablonski) 🔨	1	2	0	3	1	0	1	X	X	X	8
British Columbia (Kedziora)	0	0	1	0	0	0	0	X	X	X	1

==== Draw 4 ====
Sheet A	1	2	3	4	5	6	7	8	9	10	Final
Manitoba (Good)	0	1	0	0	0	2	0	1	0	X	4
Prince Edward Island (Gallant) 🔨	1	0	2	1	0	0	2	0	2	X	8

Sheet C	1	2	3	4	5	6	7	8	9	10	Final
Northern Ontario (Johnston)	1	0	0	0	0	1	0	0	2	1	5
Quebec (Leigh) 🔨	0	0	0	0	1	0	0	2	0	0	3

Sheet E	1	2	3	4	5	6	7	8	9	10	Final
Alberta (Yablonski) 🔨	2	2	2	0	4	0	1	X	X	X	11
Ontario (Abbis-Mills)	0	0	0	3	0	1	0	X	X	X	4

Sheet J	1	2	3	4	5	6	7	8	9	10	Final
Saskatchewan (Armstrong) 🔨	1	0	1	0	0	1	0	0	1	0	4
Yukon (Scoffin)	0	1	0	1	1	0	0	1	0	1	5

==== Draw 5 ====
Sheet A	1	2	3	4	5	6	7	8	9	10	Final
New Brunswick (Burgess) 🔨	1	0	3	0	0	1	0	0	0	0	5
Alberta (Yablonski)	0	1	0	1	0	0	1	0	0	1	4

Sheet D	1	2	3	4	5	6	7	8	9	10	11	Final
Quebec (Leigh) 🔨	1	1	0	1	0	0	2	0	2	0	0	7
Ontario (Abbis-Mills)	0	0	1	0	3	0	0	2	0	1	2	9

Sheet E	1	2	3	4	5	6	7	8	9	10	Final
Nova Scotia (Dexter) 🔨	0	0	0	1	0	1	1	0	0	X	3
Newfoundland and Labrador (Schuh)	1	4	1	0	1	0	0	0	1	X	8

Sheet H	1	2	3	4	5	6	7	8	9	10	Final
Northwest Territories (Miller)	0	1	0	1	0	0	X	X	X	X	2
British Columbia (Kedziora) 🔨	4	0	4	0	4	2	X	X	X	X	14

==== Draw 6 ====
Sheet A	1	2	3	4	5	6	7	8	9	10	11	Final
Newfoundland and Labrador (Schuh)	0	0	1	2	0	1	0	0	2	1	1	8
Saskatchewan (Armstrong) 🔨	0	0	0	0	2	0	4	1	0	0	0	7

Sheet D	1	2	3	4	5	6	7	8	9	10	Final
Yukon (Scoffin)	0	0	0	0	2	0	1	1	0	X	4
New Brunswick (Burgess) 🔨	0	0	5	0	0	1	0	0	2	X	9

Sheet E	1	2	3	4	5	6	7	8	9	10	Final
British Columbia (Kedziora)	0	0	2	0	1	0	0	3	0	3	9
Manitoba (Good) 🔨	1	1	0	3	0	0	1	0	1	0	7

Sheet G	1	2	3	4	5	6	7	8	9	10	Final
Northwest Territories (Miller) 🔨	1	0	1	0	0	0	0	0	0	X	2
Northern Ontario (Johnston)	0	2	0	0	2	0	2	2	1	X	9

Sheet J	1	2	3	4	5	6	7	8	9	10	Final
Prince Edward Island (Gallant)	2	0	3	0	0	3	0	1	X	X	9
Nova Scotia (Dexter) 🔨	0	0	0	1	1	0	1	0	X	X	3

==== Draw 7 ====
Sheet D	1	2	3	4	5	6	7	8	9	10	Final
Manitoba (Good)	0	4	0	0	1	1	0	3	2	X	11
Alberta (Yablonski) 🔨	2	0	3	0	0	0	2	0	0	X	7

Sheet F	1	2	3	4	5	6	7	8	9	10	Final
British Columbia (Kedziora) 🔨	0	2	3	0	0	1	2	0	0	2	10
New Brunswick (Burgess)	1	0	0	1	2	0	0	2	2	0	8

Sheet H	1	2	3	4	5	6	7	8	9	10	Final
Nova Scotia (Dexter) 🔨	1	1	0	1	2	0	0	1	0	0	6
Quebec (Leigh)	0	0	1	0	0	1	1	0	2	2	7

Sheet J	1	2	3	4	5	6	7	8	9	10	Final
Newfoundland and Labrador (Schuh)	0	0	0	3	3	0	0	0	1	1	8
Ontario (Abbis-Mills) 🔨	0	1	0	0	0	0	2	2	0	0	5

==== Draw 8 ====
Sheet B	1	2	3	4	5	6	7	8	9	10	Final
Alberta (Yablonski) 🔨	0	5	0	1	3	0	2	3	X	X	14
Northwest Territories (Miller)	1	0	2	0	0	1	0	0	X	X	4

Sheet F	1	2	3	4	5	6	7	8	9	10	Final
Ontario (Abbis-Mills) 🔨	0	0	4	1	3	0	7	X	X	X	15
Yukon (Scoffin)	0	1	0	0	0	2	0	X	X	X	3

Sheet G	1	2	3	4	5	6	7	8	9	10	Final
Saskatchewan (Armstrong) 🔨	2	1	1	0	0	1	0	0	0	1	6
Manitoba (Good)	0	0	0	0	2	0	0	1	1	0	4

Sheet I	1	2	3	4	5	6	7	8	9	10	11	Final
Northern Ontario (Johnston)	0	1	1	1	0	3	0	0	1	1	1	9
Prince Edward Island (Gallant) 🔨	3	0	0	0	1	0	3	1	0	0	0	8

==== Draw 9 ====
Sheet B	1	2	3	4	5	6	7	8	9	10	Final
Prince Edward Island (Gallant) 🔨	3	1	0	1	0	4	0	3	X	X	12
Quebec (Leigh)	0	0	2	0	1	0	2	0	X	X	5

Sheet D	1	2	3	4	5	6	7	8	9	10	11	Final
Northwest Territories (Miller) 🔨	0	2	0	0	0	3	0	2	0	0	1	8
Newfoundland and Labrador (Schuh)	0	0	1	1	1	0	2	0	1	1	0	7

Sheet E	1	2	3	4	5	6	7	8	9	10	11	Final
Northern Ontario (Johnston)	0	2	0	1	0	2	1	1	1	0	1	9
Saskatchewan (Armstrong) 🔨	2	0	1	0	4	0	0	0	0	1	0	8

Sheet G	1	2	3	4	5	6	7	8	9	10	Final
British Columbia (Kedziora) 🔨	2	0	0	3	0	3	1	0	X	X	9
Yukon (Scoffin)	0	0	1	0	1	0	0	2	X	X	4

Sheet I	1	2	3	4	5	6	7	8	9	10	Final
New Brunswick (Burgess)	0	1	1	0	1	1	0	0	0	1	5
Nova Scotia (Dexter) 🔨	0	0	0	1	0	0	1	0	1	0	3

==== Draw 10 ====
Sheet B	1	2	3	4	5	6	7	8	9	10	Final
Newfoundland and Labrador (Schuh) 🔨	0	1	0	1	0	1	0	0	X	X	3
British Columbia (Kedziora)	1	0	2	0	3	0	2	3	X	X	11

Sheet E	1	2	3	4	5	6	7	8	9	10	Final
Yukon (Scoffin) 🔨	1	0	1	0	1	0	0	2	1	0	6
Alberta (Yablonski)	0	2	0	1	0	2	1	0	0	2	8

Sheet G	1	2	3	4	5	6	7	8	9	10	Final
Nova Scotia (Dexter) 🔨	0	0	0	1	2	0	2	0	0	X	5
Ontario (Abbis-Mills)	0	0	3	0	0	3	0	1	1	X	8

Sheet J	1	2	3	4	5	6	7	8	9	10	Final
Manitoba (Good)	0	1	1	2	0	0	3	4	X	X	11
Northwest Territories (Miller) 🔨	0	0	0	0	1	0	0	0	X	X	1

==== Draw 11 ====
Sheet A	1	2	3	4	5	6	7	8	9	10	Final
Quebec (Leigh)	0	2	0	0	1	0	1	0	2	2	8
Newfoundland and Labrador (Schuh) 🔨	3	0	1	1	0	1	0	1	0	0	7

Sheet C	1	2	3	4	5	6	7	8	9	10	Final
Prince Edward Island (Gallant) 🔨	2	0	1	4	1	0	X	X	X	X	8
New Brunswick (Burgess)	0	2	0	0	0	1	X	X	X	X	3

Sheet F	1	2	3	4	5	6	7	8	9	10	Final
Northern Ontario (Johnston) 🔨	1	0	0	1	0	0	2	0	2	0	6
Nova Scotia (Dexter)	0	2	1	0	1	3	0	1	0	1	9

Sheet J	1	2	3	4	5	6	7	8	9	10	Final
British Columbia (Kedziora)	1	0	1	0	0	0	1	1	0	X	4
Saskatchewan (Armstrong) 🔨	0	1	0	2	1	0	0	0	2	X	6

==== Draw 12 ====
Sheet A	1	2	3	4	5	6	7	8	9	10	Final
Alberta (Yablonski) 🔨	0	2	4	0	2	0	2	0	X	X	10
Northern Ontario (Johnston)	0	0	0	1	0	3	0	1	X	X	5

Sheet C	1	2	3	4	5	6	7	8	9	10	Final
Northwest Territories (Miller) 🔨	0	0	0	1	1	0	1	1	0	0	4
Saskatchewan (Armstrong)	0	0	0	0	0	1	0	0	1	1	3

Sheet E	1	2	3	4	5	6	7	8	9	10	Final
Ontario (Abbis-Mills) 🔨	0	0	0	1	0	0	2	0	X	X	3
Prince Edward Island (Gallant)	0	1	1	0	1	3	0	3	X	X	9

Sheet G	1	2	3	4	5	6	7	8	9	10	Final
Quebec (Leigh)	0	1	0	0	1	0	1	0	0	X	3
New Brunswick (Burgess) 🔨	0	0	1	0	0	2	0	1	3	X	7

Sheet I	1	2	3	4	5	6	7	8	9	10	Final
Manitoba (Good)	0	0	2	0	2	2	2	2	X	X	10
Yukon (Scoffin) 🔨	1	0	0	2	0	0	0	0	X	X	3

==== Draw 13 ====
Sheet B	1	2	3	4	5	6	7	8	9	10	Final
Northwest Territories (Miller)	0	0	0	1	0	0	0	0	0	0	1
Yukon (Scoffin) 🔨	2	0	0	0	0	0	0	0	2	0	4

Sheet D	1	2	3	4	5	6	7	8	9	10	Final
Nova Scotia (Dexter) 🔨	0	0	0	2	0	2	1	0	1	X	6
British Columbia (Kedziora)	0	0	0	0	1	0	0	2	0	X	3

Sheet H	1	2	3	4	5	6	7	8	9	10	11	Final
Prince Edward Island (Gallant) 🔨	0	1	0	1	0	2	1	0	2	0	1	8
Newfoundland and Labrador (Schuh)	1	0	1	0	2	0	0	2	0	1	0	7

Sheet J	1	2	3	4	5	6	7	8	9	10	Final
New Brunswick (Burgess)	0	0	1	0	0	1	2	0	X	X	4
Northern Ontario (Johnston) 🔨	0	1	0	4	1	0	0	2	X	X	8

==== Draw 14 ====
Sheet A	1	2	3	4	5	6	7	8	9	10	Final
Yukon (Scoffin) 🔨	0	1	0	1	0	0	0	2	1	1	6
Nova Scotia (Dexter)	2	0	0	0	1	1	0	0	0	0	4

Sheet C	1	2	3	4	5	6	7	8	9	10	Final
Manitoba (Good)	0	2	1	1	0	0	4	2	X	X	10
Ontario (Abbis-Mills) 🔨	2	0	0	0	0	2	0	0	X	X	4

Sheet H	1	2	3	4	5	6	7	8	9	10	Final
Saskatchewan (Armstrong) 🔨	0	3	0	2	1	0	0	0	1	X	7
Alberta (Yablonski)	0	0	2	0	0	1	0	1	0	X	4

Sheet I	1	2	3	4	5	6	7	8	9	10	Final
Northwest Territories (Miller)	0	0	0	0	0	2	0	2	X	X	4
Quebec (Leigh) 🔨	1	2	1	2	3	0	4	0	X	X	13

==== Draw 15 ====
Sheet A	1	2	3	4	5	6	7	8	9	10	Final
Ontario (Abbis-Mills) 🔨	2	0	1	1	0	1	0	0	1	1	7
British Columbia (Kedziora)	0	2	0	0	2	0	2	0	0	0	6

Sheet D	1	2	3	4	5	6	7	8	9	10	11	Final
Northern Ontario (Johnston) 🔨	2	0	1	0	1	0	0	1	0	0	1	6
Manitoba (Good)	0	2	0	1	0	0	1	0	0	1	0	5

Sheet F	1	2	3	4	5	6	7	8	9	10	Final
Saskatchewan (Armstrong) 🔨	0	2	0	2	0	0	0	1	X	X	5
Quebec (Leigh)	1	0	4	0	2	1	2	0	X	X	10

Sheet G	1	2	3	4	5	6	7	8	9	10	Final
Alberta (Yablonski)	0	0	1	1	0	1	3	0	1	X	7
Prince Edward Island (Gallant) 🔨	0	2	0	0	1	0	0	1	0	X	4

Sheet I	1	2	3	4	5	6	7	8	9	10	Final
Newfoundland and Labrador (Schuh) 🔨	1	1	1	0	1	1	0	2	X	X	7
New Brunswick (Burgess)	0	0	0	1	0	0	2	0	X	X	3

==== Draw 16 ====
Sheet B	1	2	3	4	5	6	7	8	9	10	Final
New Brunswick (Burgess)	0	1	0	1	1	0	0	2	X	X	5
Saskatchewan (Armstrong) 🔨	1	0	3	0	0	3	1	0	X	X	8

Sheet D	1	2	3	4	5	6	7	8	9	10	Final
Ontario (Abbis-Mills) 🔨	3	0	0	0	2	0	0	4	0	X	9
Northwest Territories (Miller)	0	1	0	0	0	1	0	0	2	X	4

Sheet F	1	2	3	4	5	6	7	8	9	10	Final
Yukon (Scoffin)	0	1	0	0	1	1	0	1	0	X	4
Prince Edward Island (Gallant) 🔨	1	0	1	1	0	0	3	0	2	X	8

Sheet G	1	2	3	4	5	6	7	8	9	10	Final
Manitoba (Good) 🔨	2	1	0	0	1	1	1	0	1	X	7
Nova Scotia (Dexter)	0	0	0	1	0	0	0	1	0	X	2

==== Draw 17 ====
Sheet C	1	2	3	4	5	6	7	8	9	10	Final
British Columbia (Kedziora)	0	0	1	0	1	1	0	X	X	X	3
Northern Ontario (Johnston) 🔨	0	1	0	5	0	0	3	X	X	X	9

Sheet F	1	2	3	4	5	6	7	8	9	10	Final
Alberta (Yablonski)	0	3	1	0	3	0	4	X	X	X	11
Newfoundland and Labrador (Schuh) 🔨	1	0	0	2	0	0	0	X	X	X	3

Sheet H	1	2	3	4	5	6	7	8	9	10	Final
New Brunswick (Burgess) 🔨	2	0	0	1	0	0	0	1	0	0	4
Manitoba (Good)	0	0	1	0	0	1	0	0	1	0	3

Sheet J	1	2	3	4	5	6	7	8	9	10	Final
Yukon (Scoffin) 🔨	1	0	0	0	0	1	0	0	1	0	3
Quebec (Leigh)	0	0	0	0	2	0	1	1	0	0	4

==== Draw 18 ====
Sheet A	1	2	3	4	5	6	7	8	9	10	Final
Prince Edward Island (Gallant) 🔨	4	0	5	0	2	0	2	0	X	X	13
Northwest Territories (Miller)	0	2	0	2	0	1	0	0	X	X	5

Sheet C	1	2	3	4	5	6	7	8	9	10	Final
Nova Scotia (Dexter) 🔨	1	0	1	0	0	2	0	1	0	3	8
Alberta (Yablonski)	0	2	0	1	1	0	2	0	1	0	7

Sheet E	1	2	3	4	5	6	7	8	9	10	Final
Quebec (Leigh)	0	4	1	0	1	0	0	0	0	X	6
British Columbia (Kedziora)	3	0	0	3	0	0	0	3	0	X	9

Sheet G	1	2	3	4	5	6	7	8	9	10	Final
Northern Ontario (Johnston)	0	0	0	0	2	0	2	1	0	0	5
Newfoundland and Labrador (Schuh) 🔨	0	0	0	3	0	0	0	0	2	1	6

Sheet I	1	2	3	4	5	6	7	8	9	10	Final
Saskatchewan (Armstrong)	1	0	1	0	0	0	2	0	X	X	4
Ontario (Abbis-Mills) 🔨	0	3	0	2	1	2	0	3	X	X	11

=== Playoffs ===
Semifinal		Final
Prince Edward Island	13
Alberta	3	Northern Ontario	6
		Prince Edward Island	7

==== Semifinal ====
Sheet C	1	2	3	4	5	6	7	8	9	10	Final
Alberta (Yablonski)	0	0	1	0	1	0	1	0	X	X	3
Prince Edward Island (Gallant) 🔨	2	2	0	3	0	3	0	3	X	X	13

Player percentages
Alberta		Prince Edward Island	
Derek Clark	73%	Jamie Danbrook	73%
Brad Benini	67%	Anson Carmody	86%
Michael Ng	72%	Adam Casey	86%
Kevin Yablonski	59%	Brett Gallant	77%
Total	68%	Total	81%

==== Final ====
Sheet C	1	2	3	4	5	6	7	8	9	10	Final
Northern Ontario (Johnston) 🔨	3	0	1	0	1	0	0	1	0	0	6
Prince Edward Island (Gallant)	0	1	0	2	0	2	0	0	0	2	7

Player percentages
Northern Ontario		Prince Edward Island	
Mike Badiuk	89%	Jamie Danbrook	84%
Michael Makela	65%	Anson Carmody	88%
Cody Johnston	76%	Adam Casey	81%
Dylan Johnston	76%	Brett Gallant	79%
Total	77%	Total	83%

== Women's ==
=== Teams ===
Province / Territory	Skip	Third	Second	Lead
Alberta	Casey Scheidegger	Kalynn Park	Jessie Scheidegger	Jayme Coutts
British Columbia	Kelly Shimizu	Kayte Gyles	Janelle Sakamoto	Julianna Tsang
Manitoba	Kaitlyn Lawes	Jenna Loder	Laryssa Grenkow	Breanne Meakin
New Brunswick	Ashley Howard	Jillian Babin	Melissa Menzies	Emily MacRae
Newfoundland and Labrador	Erin Porter	Alysha Renouf	Kylie Power	Leah Prosser
Northern Ontario	Kendra Lilly	Vanessa Maloney (skip)	Jenny Gates	Kaitlynd Burns
Nova Scotia	Marie Christianson	Tanya Hilliard	Jane Snyder	Kaitlin Fralic
Northwest Territories	Katie Maksymowich	Valisa Aho	Danae Kelln	Natasha Petten
Ontario	Rachel Homan	Emma Miskew	Alison Kreviazuk	Lynn Kreviazuk
Prince Edward Island	Erin Carmody	Geri-Lynn Ramsay	Jessica vanOuwerkerk	Darcee Birch
Quebec	Kristen Richard	Lana Gosselin	Brittany O'Rourke	Sasha Beauchamp
Saskatchewan	Brooklyn Lemon	Amanda Craigie	Leah Mihalicz	Nicole Lang
Yukon	Sarah Koltun	Chelsea Duncan	Linea Eby	Jenna Duncan

=== Standings ===
Locale	Skip	W	L
Ontario	Rachel Homan	10	2
Alberta	Casey Scheidegger	9	3
Manitoba	Kaitlyn Lawes	8	4
Prince Edward Island	Erin Carmody	7	5
British Columbia	Kelly Shimizu	6	6
Northern Ontario	Vanessa Maloney	6	6
Quebec	Kristen Richard	6	6
New Brunswick	Ashley Howard	5	7
Nova Scotia	Marie Christianson	5	7
Saskatchewan	Janelle Lemon	5	7
Yukon	Sarah Koltun	5	7
Newfoundland and Labrador	Erin Porter	4	8
Northwest Territories	Katie Maksymowich	2	10

=== Results ===
==== Draw 1 ====
Sheet A	1	2	3	4	5	6	7	8	9	10	Final
Ontario (Homan) 🔨	1	0	3	0	2	0	1	1	0	X	8
Northern Ontario (Maloney)	0	2	0	1	0	1	0	0	2	X	6

Sheet C	1	2	3	4	5	6	7	8	9	10	Final
Prince Edward Island (Carmody) 🔨	0	1	0	2	0	0	1	0	1	X	5
Saskatchewan (Lemon)	1	0	2	0	1	0	0	3	0	X	7

Sheet F	1	2	3	4	5	6	7	8	9	10	Final
New Brunswick (Howard) 🔨	1	0	2	1	0	0	3	2	X	X	9
Northwest Territories (Maksymowich)	0	2	0	0	1	1	0	0	X	X	4

Sheet I	1	2	3	4	5	6	7	8	9	10	Final
Quebec (Richard)	0	0	1	0	1	0	0	1	1	0	4
Alberta (Scheidegger) 🔨	0	1	0	1	0	0	1	0	0	2	5

==== Draw 2 ====
Sheet A	1	2	3	4	5	6	7	8	9	10	Final
Saskatchewan (Lemon) 🔨	1	3	1	3	2	0	1	X	X	X	11
Nova Scotia (Christianson)	0	0	0	0	0	1	0	X	X	X	1

Sheet D	1	2	3	4	5	6	7	8	9	10	Final
British Columbia (Shimizu)	0	0	0	0	0	1	1	2	0	X	4
Prince Edward Island (Carmody) 🔨	0	2	1	2	3	0	0	0	2	X	10

Sheet E	1	2	3	4	5	6	7	8	9	10	Final
Newfoundland and Labrador (Porter) 🔨	0	3	0	1	0	2	0	0	0	X	6
Manitoba (Lawes)	2	0	1	0	1	0	3	1	4	X	12

Sheet G	1	2	3	4	5	6	7	8	9	10	Final
Yukon (Koltun) 🔨	1	0	1	0	0	2	1	1	1	0	7
Northern Ontario (Maloney)	0	3	0	4	4	0	0	0	0	0	11

==== Draw 3 ====
Sheet A	1	2	3	4	5	6	7	8	9	10	Final
Quebec (Richard) 🔨	1	1	1	0	1	0	0	2	0	0	6
Manitoba (Lawes)	0	0	0	1	0	0	1	0	2	1	5

Sheet D	1	2	3	4	5	6	7	8	9	10	Final
Newfoundland and Labrador (Porter) 🔨	0	2	0	0	2	1	0	1	0	4	10
Yukon (Koltun)	0	0	0	4	0	0	2	0	1	0	7

Sheet E	1	2	3	4	5	6	7	8	9	10	Final
Nova Scotia (Christianson)	0	0	0	1	3	0	2	0	3	X	9
Northwest Territories (Maksymowich) 🔨	1	0	0	0	0	2	0	1	0	X	4

Sheet G	1	2	3	4	5	6	7	8	9	10	Final
Ontario (Homan) 🔨	0	1	2	0	0	1	1	0	1	0	6
New Brunswick (Howard)	0	0	0	2	1	0	0	2	0	2	7

Sheet J	1	2	3	4	5	6	7	8	9	10	Final
Alberta (Scheidegger)	0	1	0	0	3	0	0	1	0	1	6
British Columbia (Shimizu) 🔨	0	0	0	2	0	0	1	0	1	0	4

==== Draw 4 ====
Sheet B	1	2	3	4	5	6	7	8	9	10	Final
Manitoba (Lawes)	0	1	2	3	0	0	5	X	X	X	11
Prince Edward Island (Carmody) 🔨	0	0	0	0	1	1	0	X	X	X	2

Sheet D	1	2	3	4	5	6	7	8	9	10	Final
Northern Ontario (Maloney) 🔨	0	2	1	0	2	0	1	0	0	0	6
Quebec (Richard)	1	0	0	2	0	1	0	1	1	1	7

Sheet F	1	2	3	4	5	6	7	8	9	10	Final
Alberta (Scheidegger) 🔨	0	0	0	1	1	0	1	0	1	0	4
Ontario (Homan)	0	0	0	0	0	2	0	2	0	1	5

Sheet I	1	2	3	4	5	6	7	8	9	10	Final
Saskatchewan (Lemon) 🔨	0	1	0	0	1	0	3	0	0	1	6
Yukon (Koltun)	0	0	1	1	0	3	0	1	1	0	7

==== Draw 5 ====
Sheet B	1	2	3	4	5	6	7	8	9	10	Final
New Brunswick (Howard) 🔨	2	0	0	1	0	1	0	1	0	X	5
Alberta (Scheidegger)	0	0	3	0	3	0	2	0	1	X	9

Sheet C	1	2	3	4	5	6	7	8	9	10	Final
Quebec (Richard)	0	0	0	0	2	0	0	0	0	X	2
Ontario (Homan) 🔨	0	0	0	1	0	2	0	1	1	X	5

Sheet F	1	2	3	4	5	6	7	8	9	10	Final
Nova Scotia (Christianson) 🔨	0	2	0	3	0	1	0	2	3	X	11
Newfoundland and Labrador (Porter)	1	0	2	0	2	0	1	0	0	X	6

Sheet G	1	2	3	4	5	6	7	8	9	10	Final
Northwest Territories (Maksymowich)	0	0	0	0	0	1	X	X	X	X	1
British Columbia (Shimizu) 🔨	3	3	1	0	2	0	X	X	X	X	9

==== Draw 6 ====
Sheet B	1	2	3	4	5	6	7	8	9	10	Final
Newfoundland and Labrador (Porter) 🔨	0	1	0	0	2	0	0	0	2	0	5
Saskatchewan (Lemon)	0	0	0	1	0	2	1	1	0	1	6

Sheet C	1	2	3	4	5	6	7	8	9	10	Final
Yukon (Koltun) 🔨	0	2	0	0	1	0	0	1	0	X	4
New Brunswick (Howard)	0	0	1	0	0	4	2	0	3	X	10

Sheet F	1	2	3	4	5	6	7	8	9	10	Final
British Columbia (Shimizu) 🔨	0	0	0	2	0	0	0	1	0	X	3
Manitoba (Lawes)	0	1	1	0	1	1	1	0	3	X	8

Sheet H	1	2	3	4	5	6	7	8	9	10	Final
Northwest Territories (Maksymowich)	0	0	0	3	1	0	X	X	X	X	4
Northern Ontario (Maloney) 🔨	2	3	3	0	0	7	X	X	X	X	15

Sheet I	1	2	3	4	5	6	7	8	9	10	Final
Prince Edward Island (Carmody) 🔨	1	0	1	1	1	1	0	2	2	X	9
Nova Scotia (Christianson)	0	2	0	0	0	0	2	0	0	X	4

==== Draw 7 ====
Sheet C	1	2	3	4	5	6	7	8	9	10	11	Final
Manitoba (Lawes)	0	0	3	0	1	0	0	0	0	1	0	5
Alberta (Scheidegger) 🔨	0	2	0	1	0	0	1	0	1	0	1	6

Sheet E	1	2	3	4	5	6	7	8	9	10	Final
British Columbia (Shimizu)	1	0	0	1	0	1	0	2	1	X	6
New Brunswick (Howard) 🔨	0	1	0	0	1	0	1	0	0	X	3

Sheet G	1	2	3	4	5	6	7	8	9	10	11	Final
Nova Scotia (Christianson)	0	0	0	1	0	2	0	1	0	1	0	5
Quebec (Richard) 🔨	0	0	2	0	0	0	1	0	2	0	1	6

Sheet I	1	2	3	4	5	6	7	8	9	10	Final
Newfoundland and Labrador (Porter)	0	0	0	1	0	1	0	2	0	X	4
Ontario (Homan) 🔨	1	0	2	0	2	0	2	0	1	X	8

==== Draw 8 ====
Sheet A	1	2	3	4	5	6	7	8	9	10	Final
Alberta (Scheidegger) 🔨	0	0	3	0	0	0	2	0	2	X	7
Northwest Territories (Maksymowich)	0	1	0	1	0	0	0	2	0	X	4

Sheet E	1	2	3	4	5	6	7	8	9	10	Final
Ontario (Homan) 🔨	2	0	1	0	3	1	0	2	X	X	9
Yukon (Koltun)	0	0	0	1	0	0	2	0	X	X	3

Sheet H	1	2	3	4	5	6	7	8	9	10	Final
Saskatchewan (Lemon) 🔨	0	0	0	0	0	1	X	X	X	X	1
Manitoba (Lawes)	2	2	1	4	1	0	X	X	X	X	10

Sheet J	1	2	3	4	5	6	7	8	9	10	Final
Northern Ontario (Maloney)	0	2	0	0	1	0	0	1	2	0	6
Prince Edward Island (Carmody) 🔨	2	0	0	2	0	1	2	0	0	1	8

==== Draw 9 ====
Sheet A	1	2	3	4	5	6	7	8	9	10	Final
Prince Edward Island (Carmody) 🔨	1	0	0	1	0	0	2	1	0	X	5
Quebec (Richard)	0	0	1	0	2	3	0	0	2	X	8

Sheet C	1	2	3	4	5	6	7	8	9	10	11	Final
Northwest Territories (Maksymowich)	0	1	0	0	0	0	2	1	0	1	1	6
Newfoundland and Labrador (Porter) 🔨	2	0	0	0	1	1	0	0	1	0	0	5

Sheet F	1	2	3	4	5	6	7	8	9	10	Final
Northern Ontario (Maloney) 🔨	0	1	2	1	0	1	1	2	X	X	8
Saskatchewan (Lemon)	1	0	0	0	1	0	0	0	X	X	2

Sheet H	1	2	3	4	5	6	7	8	9	10	11	Final
British Columbia (Shimizu)	0	2	0	1	0	1	0	0	2	0	1	7
Yukon (Koltun) 🔨	0	0	1	0	2	0	0	2	0	1	0	6

==== Draw 10 ====
Sheet A	1	2	3	4	5	6	7	8	9	10	Final
Newfoundland and Labrador (Porter)	0	0	1	0	1	0	2	0	0	0	4
British Columbia (Shimizu) 🔨	1	0	0	2	0	1	0	1	1	0	6

Sheet F	1	2	3	4	5	6	7	8	9	10	11	Final
Yukon (Koltun) 🔨	1	0	0	1	0	0	1	1	1	0	1	6
Alberta (Scheidegger)	0	0	2	0	1	0	0	0	0	2	0	5

Sheet H	1	2	3	4	5	6	7	8	9	10	Final
Nova Scotia (Christianson)	0	0	0	0	1	0	0	0	X	X	1
Ontario (Homan) 🔨	0	1	0	2	0	2	2	1	X	X	8

Sheet I	1	2	3	4	5	6	7	8	9	10	Final
Manitoba (Lawes)	0	0	2	0	1	1	0	2	3	X	9
Northwest Territories (Maksymowich) 🔨	3	1	0	1	0	0	1	0	0	X	6

==== Draw 11 ====
Sheet B	1	2	3	4	5	6	7	8	9	10	Final
Quebec (Richard)	0	1	0	0	0	0	0	1	0	0	2
Newfoundland and Labrador (Porter) 🔨	1	0	0	0	0	0	0	0	0	2	3

Sheet D	1	2	3	4	5	6	7	8	9	10	Final
Prince Edward Island (Carmody) 🔨	0	3	0	0	1	1	1	3	0	1	10
New Brunswick (Howard)	0	0	4	1	0	0	0	0	3	0	8

Sheet E	1	2	3	4	5	6	7	8	9	10	Final
Northern Ontario (Maloney)	0	0	1	0	2	0	2	1	0	1	7
Nova Scotia (Christianson) 🔨	0	1	0	1	0	2	0	0	1	0	5

Sheet I	1	2	3	4	5	6	7	8	9	10	Final
British Columbia (Shimizu)	0	0	0	0	1	0	1	0	2	X	4
Saskatchewan (Lemon) 🔨	1	0	0	1	0	1	0	5	0	X	8

==== Draw 12 ====
Sheet B	1	2	3	4	5	6	7	8	9	10	Final
Alberta (Scheidegger) 🔨	2	0	1	0	1	0	1	1	0	1	7
Northern Ontario (Maloney)	0	2	0	0	0	1	0	0	1	0	4

Sheet D	1	2	3	4	5	6	7	8	9	10	Final
Northwest Territories (Maksymowich) 🔨	1	0	0	1	0	2	1	0	1	X	6
Saskatchewan (Lemon)	0	0	0	0	2	0	0	1	0	X	3

Sheet F	1	2	3	4	5	6	7	8	9	10	Final
Ontario (Homan) 🔨	0	2	0	0	2	0	2	0	0	0	6
Prince Edward Island (Carmody)	0	0	0	1	0	1	0	1	2	0	5

Sheet H	1	2	3	4	5	6	7	8	9	10	Final
Quebec (Richard) 🔨	0	0	1	0	0	1	0	0	2	0	4
New Brunswick (Howard)	2	0	0	0	2	0	1	1	0	0	6

Sheet J	1	2	3	4	5	6	7	8	9	10	Final
Manitoba (Lawes)	0	0	1	0	4	0	1	0	0	0	6
Yukon (Koltun) 🔨	0	1	0	0	0	4	0	1	1	1	8

==== Draw 13 ====
Sheet A	1	2	3	4	5	6	7	8	9	10	Final
Northwest Territories (Maksymowich)	0	0	0	1	0	0	3	0	X	X	4
Yukon (Koltun) 🔨	0	1	1	0	2	2	0	3	X	X	9

Sheet C	1	2	3	4	5	6	7	8	9	10	Final
Nova Scotia (Christianson) 🔨	0	2	0	0	0	0	0	X	X	X	2
British Columbia (Shimizu)	0	0	3	1	2	1	3	X	X	X	10

Sheet G	1	2	3	4	5	6	7	8	9	10	Final
Prince Edward Island (Carmody) 🔨	2	2	2	0	1	0	3	0	1	X	11
Newfoundland and Labrador (Porter)	0	0	0	4	0	1	0	2	0	X	7

Sheet I	1	2	3	4	5	6	7	8	9	10	Final
New Brunswick (Howard) 🔨	0	1	0	2	0	1	0	0	1	X	5
Northern Ontario (Maloney)	1	0	1	0	2	0	1	1	0	X	6

==== Draw 14 ====
Sheet B	1	2	3	4	5	6	7	8	9	10	Final
Yukon (Koltun) 🔨	2	0	1	0	0	1	0	0	2	0	6
Nova Scotia (Christianson)	0	4	0	0	1	0	1	0	0	3	10

Sheet D	1	2	3	4	5	6	7	8	9	10	Final
Manitoba (Lawes)	0	1	0	0	0	1	0	0	2	X	4
Ontario (Homan) 🔨	1	0	0	0	3	0	2	1	0	X	7

Sheet G	1	2	3	4	5	6	7	8	9	10	Final
Saskatchewan (Lemon)	0	0	1	0	0	0	0	1	X	X	2
Alberta (Scheidegger) 🔨	1	1	0	0	1	2	1	0	X	X	6

Sheet J	1	2	3	4	5	6	7	8	9	10	Final
Northwest Territories (Maksymowich)	0	0	1	0	0	1	0	0	0	X	2
Quebec (Richard) 🔨	0	1	0	1	0	0	0	2	1	X	5

==== Draw 15 ====
Sheet B	1	2	3	4	5	6	7	8	9	10	Final
Ontario (Homan) 🔨	1	1	0	0	3	0	0	1	0	0	6
British Columbia (Shimizu)	0	0	1	1	0	3	1	0	0	1	7

Sheet C	1	2	3	4	5	6	7	8	9	10	Final
Northern Ontario (Maloney) 🔨	1	0	1	0	1	0	1	1	0	X	5
Manitoba (Lawes)	0	2	0	2	0	1	0	0	3	X	8

Sheet E	1	2	3	4	5	6	7	8	9	10	Final
Saskatchewan (Lemon) 🔨	0	1	0	3	0	1	3	0	2	X	10
Quebec (Richard)	0	0	3	0	1	0	0	1	0	X	5

Sheet H	1	2	3	4	5	6	7	8	9	10	Final
Alberta (Scheidegger) 🔨	1	0	0	0	1	0	2	0	1	2	7
Prince Edward Island (Carmody)	0	2	0	0	0	1	0	1	0	0	4

Sheet J	1	2	3	4	5	6	7	8	9	10	Final
Newfoundland and Labrador (Porter)	0	0	0	0	1	0	2	1	1	1	6
New Brunswick (Howard) 🔨	2	0	0	0	0	2	0	0	0	0	4

==== Draw 16 ====
Sheet A	1	2	3	4	5	6	7	8	9	10	Final
New Brunswick (Howard)	0	0	2	0	0	0	1	1	2	1	7
Saskatchewan (Lemon) 🔨	0	0	0	1	1	2	0	0	0	0	4

Sheet C	1	2	3	4	5	6	7	8	9	10	Final
Ontario (Homan) 🔨	1	0	6	4	2	0	X	X	X	X	13
Northwest Territories (Maksymowich)	0	1	0	0	0	1	X	X	X	X	2

Sheet E	1	2	3	4	5	6	7	8	9	10	Final
Yukon (Koltun)	0	0	0	2	0	2	0	1	1	0	6
Prince Edward Island (Carmody) 🔨	2	1	0	0	1	0	1	0	0	2	7

Sheet H	1	2	3	4	5	6	7	8	9	10	Final
Manitoba (Lawes) 🔨	2	0	1	0	1	0	1	1	1	2	9
Nova Scotia (Christianson)	0	2	0	2	0	2	0	0	0	0	6

==== Draw 17 ====
Sheet D	1	2	3	4	5	6	7	8	9	10	Final
British Columbia (Shimizu)	3	0	0	1	0	0	0	0	0	0	4
Northern Ontario (Maloney) 🔨	0	3	1	0	0	0	0	0	0	1	5

Sheet E	1	2	3	4	5	6	7	8	9	10	Final
Alberta (Scheidegger) 🔨	2	0	1	0	2	1	4	X	X	X	10
Newfoundland and Labrador (Porter)	0	0	0	1	0	0	0	X	X	X	1

Sheet G	1	2	3	4	5	6	7	8	9	10	Final
New Brunswick (Howard)	1	0	0	0	0	2	0	0	0	X	3
Manitoba (Lawes) 🔨	0	2	1	1	1	0	0	1	1	X	7

Sheet I	1	2	3	4	5	6	7	8	9	10	Final
Yukon (Koltun) 🔨	1	0	3	0	2	0	2	1	0	X	9
Quebec (Richard)	0	1	0	2	0	2	0	0	1	X	6

==== Draw 18 ====
Sheet B	1	2	3	4	5	6	7	8	9	10	Final
Prince Edward Island (Carmody) 🔨	2	0	2	1	0	0	2	0	2	X	9
Northwest Territories (Maksymowich)	0	1	0	0	1	0	0	1	0	X	3

Sheet D	1	2	3	4	5	6	7	8	9	10	Final
Nova Scotia (Christianson) 🔨	2	0	2	1	0	1	0	0	1	2	9
Alberta (Scheidegger)	0	1	0	0	2	0	2	3	0	0	8

Sheet F	1	2	3	4	5	6	7	8	9	10	Final
Quebec (Richard) 🔨	2	1	0	2	0	2	1	0	0	X	8
British Columbia (Shimizu)	0	0	1	0	2	0	0	2	1	X	6

Sheet H	1	2	3	4	5	6	7	8	9	10	Final
Northern Ontario (Maloney)	0	1	0	1	0	2	0	0	1	X	5
Newfoundland and Labrador (Porter) 🔨	2	0	1	0	1	0	2	3	0	X	9

Sheet J	1	2	3	4	5	6	7	8	9	10	Final
Saskatchewan (Lemon)	0	0	1	0	1	0	0	0	X	X	2
Ontario (Homan) 🔨	0	3	0	2	0	0	3	1	X	X	9

=== Playoffs ===
Semifinal		Final
Alberta	6
Manitoba	7	Ontario	4
		Manitoba	7

==== Semifinal ====
Sheet C	1	2	3	4	5	6	7	8	9	10	11	Final
Manitoba (Lawes)	0	0	0	2	0	3	0	1	0	0	1	7
Alberta (Scheidegger) 🔨	0	0	1	0	2	0	2	0	0	1	0	6

Player percentages
Manitoba		Alberta	
Breanne Meakin	85%	Jayme Coutts	84%
Laryssa Grenkow	81%	Jessie Scheidegger	84%
Jenna Loder	78%	Kalynn Park	72%
Kaitlyn Lawes	78%	Casey Scheidegger	88%
Total	81%	Total	82%

==== Final ====
Sheet C	1	2	3	4	5	6	7	8	9	10	Final
Ontario (Homan) 🔨	0	0	1	0	0	1	0	0	2	0	4
Manitoba (Lawes)	0	0	0	0	1	0	2	1	0	3	7

Player percentages
Ontario		Manitoba	
Lynn Kreviazuk	86%	Breanne Meakin	91%
Alison Kreviazuk	76%	Laryssa Grenkow	74%
Emma Miskew	75%	Jenna Loder	85%
Rachel Homan	63%	Kaitlyn Lawes	72%
Total	75%	Total	81%

== Qualification ==
=== Ontario ===
The Pepsi Ontario Junior Curling Championships were held January 7–11 at the Gananoque Curling Club in Gananoque.

Rachel Homan and her rink from the Ottawa Curling Club defeated Katie Morrissey of the neighbouring Rideau Curling Club 11-4 in the women's final. Team Homan went undefeated at the tournament, finishing with an 8-0 record. Morrissey had beaten Danielle Inglis of Burlington 8-3 in the semifinal. Both rinks finished tied after round robin play.

In the men's final, Bowie Abbis-Mills out of the KW Granite Club defeated Neil Sinclair of Manotick 6-5. Abbis-Mills won his semifinal match against Ilderton's Chris Liscumb rink 14-6. Sinclair earned a bye to the final after posting the best round robin record at 6-1. Both Abbis-Mills and Liscombe finished the round robin with 5-2 records.
