= Jamie Danbrook =

Canadian curler

- Curler
- Born: June 5, 1988 (age 38); Vernon, British Columbia

Curling career
- Member Association: British Columbia (2004-2008); Prince Edward Island (2008-2009); Newfoundland and Labrador (2009-2011; 2012-2013); Ontario (2011-2012); Nova Scotia (2013-present)
- Brier: 1 (2011)
Medal record
Men's curling
Representing Canada
World Junior Curling Championships
Silver medal – second place	2009 Vancouver
Representing Newfoundland and Labrador
Tim Hortons Brier
Bronze medal – third place	2011 London

Jamie Danbrook (born June 5, 1988, in Vernon, British Columbia) is a Canadian curler.

== Career ==
=== Junior career: British Columbia & P.E.I. ===
Danbrook won three provincial junior titles for two different provinces. In 2005 and 2008, he won the British Columbia junior titles. In 2005 playing second for Tyrel Griffith and in 2008 playing lead for Jay Wakefield. The 2005 team went 4–8 at the 2005 Canadian Junior Curling Championships. In 2008, the team went 5-7 at nationals. That year Danbrook moved to Prince Edward Island where he joined the Brett Gallant rink as lead. The team won the P.E.I. junior championship and the 2009 Canadian Junior Curling Championships. At the 2009 World Junior Curling Championships, representing Canada, the team lost in the gold medal final to Denmark.

=== 2010-11: Newfoundland and Labrador ===
In 2010, Danbrook moved to Newfoundland and Labrador. He played second for Matt Blandford at the 2010 Newfoundland and Labrador Tankard, which lost in the tie breaker match. At the end of the season it was announced that Danbrook would play as Brad Gushue's alternate for the 2010-11 curling season, and would play lead for the team at the 2011 Newfoundland and Labrador Tankard (as normal skip Randy Ferbey lives in Alberta). The team won the Tankard, and therefore Danbrook would play in his first Brier. Ferbey left the team in February 2011, promoting Danbrook to the position of lead on a full-time basis.

=== 2011-13: Ontario and Newfoundland again ===
During the 2011 off-season, Danbrook moved to the Sarnia, Ontario based Mark Bice while residing in Toronto. However, he left the team after the 2011–12 season and returned to Newfoundland again as the lead for the Andrew Symonds team. He played in the 2013 Newfoundland and Labrador Tankard, with the Symonds team finishing the round robin with a 5–2 record. However, they lost in their first playoff game.

=== 2013-present: Nova Scotia ===
This lasted for one season, when he moved to Halifax, Nova Scotia to play lead for Brent MacDougall. After one season with MacDougall, he formed his own team in 2014. Danbrook won his first career World Curling Tour event in his first event as a skip, when he won the 2014 Gibson's Cashspiel.
