= 2011 Canadian Direct Insurance BC Men's Curling Championship =

Sport competition

- Host city: Vernon, British Columbia
- Arena: Vernon Curling Club
- Dates: February 7-13
- Winner: Jim Cotter
- Curling club: Kelowna CC, Kelowna, BC
- Skip: Jim Cotter
- Third: Ken Maskiewich
- Second: Kevin Folk
- Lead: Rick Sawatsky
- Finalist: Neil Dangerfield

The 2011 Canadian Direct Insurance BC Men's Curling Championship (British Columbia's men's provincial curling championship) was held February 7–13 at the Vernon Curling Club in Vernon, British Columbia. The winning team of Jim Cotter will represent British Columbia at the 2011 Tim Hortons Brier in London, Ontario.

== Teams ==
Skip	Third	Second	Lead	Club(s)
Tom Buchy	Ken McHargue	Dave Toffolo	Darren Will	Kimberley Curling Club, Kimberley, British Columbia
Jason Clarke	Ken Miscovitch	Todd Troyer	Troy Ziegler	Victoria Curling Club, Victoria, British Columbia
Jim Cotter	Ken Maskiewich	Kevin Folk	Rick Sawatsky	Kelowna Curling Club, Kelowna, British Columbia
Neil Dangerfield	Denis Sutton	Darren Boden	Glen Allen	Victoria Curling Club, Victoria, British Columbia
Sean Geall	Grant Dezura	Kevin Recksiedler	Kevin MacKenzie	Royal City Curling Club, New Westminster
Darin Heath	Gary vandenberghe	Ryan Le Drew	Darrell Houston	Vernon Curling Club, Vernon, British Columbia
Aron Herrick	Tobin Senum	Marc Fillion	Jason Wizniak	Vernon Curling Club, Vernon, British Columbia
Brent Pierce	Paul Cseke	Jay Wakefield	John Cullen	Royal City Curling Club, New Westminster
Jeff Richard	Tom Shypitka	Tyler Orme	Chris Anderson	Kelowna Curling Club, Kelowna, British Columbia
Brent Yamada	Corey Sauer	Andrew Barnes	Lance Yamada	Kamloops Curling Clubs, Kamloops, British Columbia

== Standings ==
Skip (Club)	W	L	PF	PA	Ends Won	Ends Lost	Blank Ends	Stolen Ends
Jim Cotter (Kelowna)	9	0	64	40	39	31	14	7
Neil Dangerfield (Victoria)	7	2	74	49	43	29	5	14
Jeff Richard (Kelowna)	7	2	69	57	40	37	8	10
Brent Yamada (Kamloops)	4	5	53	50	36	37	12	7
Aron Herrick (Vernon)	4	5	55	69	41	37	7	9
Darren Heath (Vernon)	4	5	58	50	39	40	9	13
Brent Pierce (Royal City)	3	6	48	59	32	30	7	8
Sean Geall (Royal City)	3	6	54	60	33	41	7	6
Tom Buchy (Kimberley)	3	6	49	70	35	41	5	8
Jason Clarke (Victoria)	1	8	55	75	36	44	5	5

== Results ==
=== Draw 1 ===
February 7, 12:00 PM PT

Sheet A	1	2	3	4	5	6	7	8	9	10	Final
Richard	0	0	0	2	1	0	2	0	2	X	7
Yamada	0	0	1	0	0	2	0	1	0	X	4

Sheet B	1	2	3	4	5	6	7	8	9	10	Final
Geall	0	1	0	0	0	1	0	1	0	X	3
Heath	2	0	1	1	1	0	1	0	1	X	7

Sheet C	1	2	3	4	5	6	7	8	9	10	Final
Dangerfield	1	0	6	2	1	1	X	X	X	X	11
Buchy	0	1	0	0	0	0	X	X	X	X	1

Sheet D	1	2	3	4	5	6	7	8	9	10	Final
Pierce	0	1	0	1	0	1	0	2	0	X	5
Herrick	0	0	1	0	2	0	4	0	1	X	8

Sheet E	1	2	3	4	5	6	7	8	9	10	Final
Clarke	0	0	1	0	0	1	0	0	2	X	4
Cotter	2	0	0	2	0	0	2	1	0	X	7

=== Draw 2 ===
February 7, 7:30 PM PT

Sheet A	1	2	3	4	5	6	7	8	9	10	Final
Pierce	0	0	0	2	0	2	3	0	3	X	10
Geall	0	2	0	0	4	0	0	1	0	X	7

Sheet B	1	2	3	4	5	6	7	8	9	10	Final
Richard	1	3	1	0	0	2	0	0	0	1	8
Buchy	0	0	0	2	1	0	3	1	0	0	7

Sheet C	1	2	3	4	5	6	7	8	9	10	Final
Yamada	2	1	0	1	0	1	0	0	1	0	6
Clarke	0	0	1	0	1	0	2	0	0	1	5

Sheet D	1	2	3	4	5	6	7	8	9	10	Final
Dangerfield	0	1	0	1	1	1	0	0	2	0	6
Cotter	0	0	3	0	0	0	2	1	0	1	7

Sheet E	1	2	3	4	5	6	7	8	9	10	11	Final
Herrick	0	1	0	0	1	1	0	1	1	1	2	8
Heath	2	0	0	2	0	0	2	0	0	0	0	6

=== Draw 3 ===
February 8, 12:00 PM PT

Sheet A	1	2	3	4	5	6	7	8	9	10	Final
Heath	1	0	0	3	2	0	1	0	4	X	11
Dangerfield	0	1	1	0	0	1	0	1	0	X	4

Sheet B	1	2	3	4	5	6	7	8	9	10	Final
Clarke	0	1	0	2	0	1	1	0	0	0	5
Herrick	0	0	1	0	2	0	0	1	1	1	6

Sheet C	1	2	3	4	5	6	7	8	9	10	Final
Cotter	0	1	0	1	0	0	2	0	0	1	5
Richard	0	0	1	0	2	0	0	0	1	0	4

Sheet D	1	2	3	4	5	6	7	8	9	10	11	Final
Geall	1	0	1	0	1	2	0	0	1	0	2	8
Yamada	0	1	0	1	0	0	2	1	0	1	0	6

Sheet E	1	2	3	4	5	6	7	8	9	10	Final
Buchy	0	0	1	1	0	1	0	0	X	X	3
Pierce	1	1	0	0	2	0	2	2	X	X	8

=== Draw 4 ===
February 8, 7:00 PM PT

Sheet A	1	2	3	4	5	6	7	8	9	10	Final
Clarke	0	2	0	1	5	0	0	0	1	0	8
Richard	2	0	2	0	0	1	2	1	0	3	11

Sheet B	1	2	3	4	5	6	7	8	9	10	Final
Dangerfield	1	0	0	2	0	2	0	2	0	1	8
Geall	0	2	1	0	1	0	2	0	0	0	6

Sheet C	1	2	3	4	5	6	7	8	9	10	Final
Heath	0	0	2	0	0	1	0	0	1	0	4
Pierce	0	1	0	0	1	0	1	1	0	1	5

Sheet D	1	2	3	4	5	6	7	8	9	10	11	Final
Herrick	0	2	0	0	2	1	0	2	0	1	0	8
Buchy	4	0	1	1	0	0	1	0	1	0	1	9

Sheet E	1	2	3	4	5	6	7	8	9	10	Final
Cotter	0	0	0	0	2	1	0	0	0	1	4
Yamada	0	1	1	0	0	0	0	1	0	0	3

=== Draw 5 ===
February 9, 12:00 PM PT

Sheet A	1	2	3	4	5	6	7	8	9	10	Final
Cotter	3	0	1	0	1	0	2	1	X	X	8
Pierce	0	1	0	1	0	1	0	0	X	X	3

Sheet B	1	2	3	4	5	6	7	8	9	10	Final
Buchy	0	2	0	0	1	0	1	0	2	1	7
Yamada	2	0	1	0	0	1	0	1	0	0	5

Sheet C	1	2	3	4	5	6	7	8	9	10	11	Final
Geall	0	0	1	2	1	0	1	0	0	1	0	6
Herrick	1	1	0	0	0	0	0	2	2	0	1	7

Sheet D	1	2	3	4	5	6	7	8	9	10	Final
Heath	0	0	1	0	0	1	1	0	1	1	5
Richard	2	1	0	1	1	0	0	1	0	0	6

Sheet E	1	2	3	4	5	6	7	8	9	10	Final
Dangerfield	0	1	0	4	0	2	0	3	0	X	10
Clarke	2	0	1	0	2	0	1	0	1	X	7

=== Draw 6 ===
February 9, 7:00 PM PT

Sheet A	1	2	3	4	5	6	7	8	9	10	Final
Dangerfield	0	1	0	1	0	4	1	1	1	X	9
Herrick	0	0	3	0	2	0	0	0	0	X	5

Sheet B	1	2	3	4	5	6	7	8	9	10	11	Final
Heath	0	3	0	1	0	0	1	0	1	1	0	7
Cotter	2	0	2	0	0	2	0	1	0	0	1	8

Sheet C	1	2	3	4	5	6	7	8	9	10	Final
Pierce	1	0	1	0	1	0	1	1	0	X	5
Yamada	0	2	0	2	0	1	0	0	3	X	8

Sheet D	1	2	3	4	5	6	7	8	9	10	11	Final
Buchy	2	0	0	1	1	0	1	0	2	0	4	11
Clarke	0	1	2	0	0	2	0	1	0	1	0	7

Sheet E	1	2	3	4	5	6	7	8	9	10	Final
Richard	1	0	0	2	0	3	2	X	X	X	8
Geall	0	1	0	0	1	0	0	X	X	X	2

=== Draw 7 ===
February 10, 12:00 PM PT

Sheet A	1	2	3	4	5	6	7	8	9	10	Final
Buchy	0	0	0	2	1	0	0	0	0	X	3
Heath	1	1	0	0	0	2	1	1	0	X	6

Sheet B	1	2	3	4	5	6	7	8	9	10	Final
Pierce	1	0	1	0	2	3	0	0	0	X	7
Clarke	0	2	0	3	0	0	2	0	3	X	10

Sheet C	1	2	3	4	5	6	7	8	9	10	Final
Richard	0	1	0	0	1	0	X	X	X	X	2
Dangerfield	1	0	2	1	0	5	X	X	X	X	9

Sheet D	1	2	3	4	5	6	7	8	9	10	Final
Cotter	1	1	0	0	0	1	1	0	1	1	6
Geall	0	0	2	0	0	0	0	2	0	0	4

Sheet E	1	2	3	4	5	6	7	8	9	10	Final
Yamada	0	1	0	2	2	0	2	1	X	X	8
Herrick	0	0	1	0	0	1	0	0	X	X	2

=== Draw 8 ===
February 10, 7:00 PM PT

Sheet A	1	2	3	4	5	6	7	8	9	10	Final
Geall	0	2	1	0	3	1	0	2	X	X	9
Clarke	1	0	0	1	0	0	2	0	X	X	4

Sheet B	1	2	3	4	5	6	7	8	9	10	Final
Herrick	2	0	2	0	1	0	0	1	0	X	6
Richard	0	2	0	4	0	0	3	0	1	X	10

Sheet C	1	2	3	4	5	6	7	8	9	10	Final
Buchy	0	0	2	0	1	0	1	0	1	X	5
Cotter	1	0	0	2	0	2	0	3	0	X	8

Sheet D	1	2	3	4	5	6	7	8	9	10	Final
Yamada	0	1	0	0	5	1	0	0	1	X	8
Heath	0	0	1	0	0	0	2	1	0	X	4

Sheet E	1	2	3	4	5	6	7	8	9	10	Final
Pierce	2	0	0	0	2	0	0	1	0	X	5
Dangerfield	0	1	0	3	0	2	2	0	1	X	9

=== Draw 9 ===
February 11, 9:30 AM PT

Sheet A	1	2	3	4	5	6	7	8	9	10	Final
Herrick	0	1	0	2	0	2	0	X	X	X	5
Cotter	1	0	3	0	3	0	4	X	X	X	11

Sheet B	1	2	3	4	5	6	7	8	9	10	Final
Yamada	0	0	0	2	0	1	0	2	0	X	5
Dangerfield	0	1	1	0	2	0	2	0	2	X	8

Sheet C	1	2	3	4	5	6	7	8	9	10	Final
Clarke	1	0	0	1	0	1	0	2	0	X	5
Heath	0	2	2	0	1	0	1	0	2	X	8

Sheet D	1	2	3	4	5	6	7	8	9	10	Final
Richard	2	1	0	4	0	3	X	X	X	X	10
Pierce	0	0	1	0	2	0	X	X	X	X	3

Sheet E	1	2	3	4	5	6	7	8	9	10	Final
Geall	0	0	4	0	3	0	2	X	X	X	9
Buchy	1	1	0	1	0	1	0	X	X	X	4

=== Tie Breaker 1 ===
February 11, 2:30 PM PT

Sheet D	1	2	3	4	5	6	7	8	9	10	Final
Herrick	2	0	3	0	1	0	1	0	1	1	9
Heath	0	1	0	1	0	2	0	2	0	0	6

=== Tie Breaker 2 ===
February 11, 7:00 PM PT

Sheet D	1	2	3	4	5	6	7	8	9	10	11	Final
Yamada	0	1	0	0	2	0	2	0	2	0	1	8
Herrick	0	0	0	1	0	2	0	3	0	1	0	7

== Playoffs ==
Page playoff system
1	Jim Cotter	4
2	Neil Dangerfield	5
3	Jeff Richard	6
4	Brent Yamada	5

Semifinal
1	Jim Cotter	8
3	Jeff Richard	4

Final
2	Neil Dangerfield	4
1	Jim Cotter	6

=== 1 vs. 2 ===
February 11, 7:00 PM PT

Sheet D	1	2	3	4	5	6	7	8	9	10	Final
Cotter	2	0	0	0	0	0	1	1	0	0	4
Dangerfield	0	0	0	1	1	1	0	0	1	1	5

=== 3 vs. 4 ===
February 12, 12:00 PM PT

Sheet D	1	2	3	4	5	6	7	8	9	10	Final
Richard	0	0	1	0	2	0	0	2	0	1	6
Yamada	1	0	0	1	0	0	2	0	1	0	5

=== Semifinal ===
February 12, 7:30 PM PT

Sheet D	1	2	3	4	5	6	7	8	9	10	Final
Cotter	0	2	1	0	2	1	1	0	1	X	8
Richard	0	0	0	2	0	0	0	2	0	X	4

=== Final ===
February 13, 3:00 PM PT

Sheet D	1	2	3	4	5	6	7	8	9	10	Final
Dangerfield	1	0	2	0	0	0	0	1	0	X	4
Cotter	0	2	0	1	1	0	1	0	1	X	6
