= 2023 Canadian Mixed Curling Championship =

- Host city: Swift Current, Saskatchewan
- Arena: Swift Current Curling Club
- Dates: November 5–11
- Winner: Saskatchewan
- Curling club: Swift Current CC, Swift Current
- Skip: Shaun Meachem
- Third: Kelly Schafer
- Second: Chris Haichert
- Lead: Teejay Haichert
- Finalist: Manitoba (Kurz)

The 2023 Canadian Mixed Curling Championship was held from November 5 to 11 at the Swift Current Curling Club in Swift Current, Saskatchewan. The winning team of Shaun Meachem, Kelly Schafer, Chris Haichert and Teejay Haichert from Saskatchewan will represent Canada at the 2024 World Mixed Curling Championship.

== Teams ==
The teams are listed as follows:

Team	Skip	Third	Second	Lead	Locale
Alberta	Evan van Amsterdam	Danielle Schmiemann	Benton Boychuk-Chorney	Paige Papley	Thistle CC, Edmonton
British Columbia	Cameron de Jong	Taylor Reese-Hansen	Erik Colwell	Megan McGillivray	Victoria CC, Victoria
Manitoba	Kyle Kurz	Beth Peterson	Ian McMillan	Melissa Gordon-Kurz	Fort Rouge CC, Winnipeg
New Brunswick	Charlie Sullivan	Leah Thompson	Josh Vaughan	Carol Webb	Thistle-St. Andrews CC, Saint John
Newfoundland and Labrador	Keith Ryan	Marcie Brown	Mike Ryan	Sheryl Ryan	Carol CC, Labrador City
Northern Ontario	Trevor Bonot	Jackie McCormick	Mike McCarville	Amanda Gates	Fort William CC, Thunder Bay
Northwest Territories	Jamie Koe	Margot Flemming	Cole Parsons	Megan Koehler	Yellowknife CC, Yellowknife
Nova Scotia	Paul Flemming	Marlee Powers	Luke Saunders	Colleen Jones	Halifax CC, Halifax
Nunavut	Peter Van Strien	Meredith Penner	Justin McDonell	Alison Taylor	Iqaluit CC, Iqaluit
Ontario	Scott McDonald	Lori Eddy	Matthew Hall	Laura Neil	St. Thomas CC, St. Thomas
Prince Edward Island	Tyler Smith	Darcee Birch	Alex MacFadyen	Melissa Morrow	Crapaud Community CC, Crapaud
Quebec	Pierre-Luc Morissette	Genviève Frappier	Samuel Richard	Alison Davies	CC Jacques-Cartier, Sillery, Rosemère CC, Rosemère, Glenmore CC, Dollard-des-Ormeaux & CC Trois-Rivières, Trois-Rivières
Saskatchewan	Shaun Meachem	Kelly Schafer	Chris Haichert	Teejay Haichert	Swift Current CC, Swift Current
Yukon	Terry Miller	Laini Klassen	Peter Andersen	Laura Wilson	Whitehorse CC, Whitehorse

== Round robin standings ==
Final Round Robin Standings

Key
Teams to Championship Pool

Pool A	Skip	W	L
Saskatchewan	Shaun Meachem	5	1
Ontario	Scott McDonald	5	1
Nova Scotia	Paul Flemming	5	1
Prince Edward Island	Tyler Smith	2	4
Quebec	Pierre-Luc Morissette	2	4
Yukon	Terry Miller	1	5
Northern Ontario	Trevor Bonot	1	5

Pool B	Skip	W	L
Manitoba	Kyle Kurz	6	0
Northwest Territories	Jamie Koe	5	1
Alberta	Evan van Amsterdam	4	2
New Brunswick	Charlie Sullivan	3	3
British Columbia	Cameron de Jong	2	4
Newfoundland and Labrador	Keith Ryan	1	5
Nunavut	Peter Van Strien	0	6

== Round robin results ==
All draws are listed in Central Time (UTC−05:00).

=== Draw 1 ===
Sunday, November 5, 12:30 pm

Sheet A	1	2	3	4	5	6	7	8	Final
Nova Scotia (Flemming)	1	0	2	0	0	3	0	2	8
Saskatchewan (Meachem)	0	1	0	2	2	0	1	0	6

Sheet B	1	2	3	4	5	6	7	8	Final
Quebec (Morissette)	3	0	0	1	0	0	4	X	8
Yukon (Miller)	0	2	1	0	1	0	0	X	4

Sheet C	1	2	3	4	5	6	7	8	Final
Northwest Territories (Koe)	1	0	3	1	0	2	1	0	8
Nunavut (Van Strien)	0	2	0	0	4	0	0	1	7

Sheet D	1	2	3	4	5	6	7	8	9	Final
Alberta (van Amsterdam)	0	1	0	2	0	1	2	0	2	8
British Columbia (de Jong)	0	0	2	0	2	0	0	2	0	6

=== Draw 2 ===
Sunday, November 5, 5:30 pm

Sheet A	1	2	3	4	5	6	7	8	Final
Ontario (McDonald)	0	1	2	0	2	2	0	1	8
Yukon (Miller)	1	0	0	2	0	0	2	0	5

Sheet B	1	2	3	4	5	6	7	8	Final
Northern Ontario (Bonot)	2	0	1	0	1	1	0	X	5
Prince Edward Island (Smith)	0	1	0	1	0	0	1	X	3

Sheet C	1	2	3	4	5	6	7	8	Final
Manitoba (Kurz)	4	0	2	2	0	3	X	X	11
Newfoundland and Labrador (Ryan)	0	3	0	0	1	0	X	X	4

Sheet D	1	2	3	4	5	6	7	8	Final
New Brunswick (Sullivan)	0	2	2	0	1	3	4	X	12
Nunavut (Van Strien)	1	0	0	1	0	0	0	X	2

=== Draw 3 ===
Monday, November 6, 10:00 am

Sheet B	1	2	3	4	5	6	7	8	Final
Alberta (van Amsterdam)	2	0	2	0	0	0	0	0	4
Northwest Territories (Koe)	0	1	0	2	0	1	0	1	5

Sheet C	1	2	3	4	5	6	7	8	Final
Nova Scotia (Flemming)	1	0	1	0	2	1	0	3	8
Quebec (Morissette)	0	2	0	1	0	0	4	0	7

=== Draw 4 ===
Monday, November 6, 2:00 pm

Sheet A	1	2	3	4	5	6	7	8	Final
Manitoba (Kurz)	2	2	5	2	0	1	X	X	12
Nunavut (Van Strien)	0	0	0	0	1	0	X	X	1

Sheet B	1	2	3	4	5	6	7	8	Final
British Columbia (de Jong)	1	3	0	0	5	1	X	X	10
Newfoundland and Labrador (Ryan)	0	0	2	0	0	0	X	X	2

Sheet C	1	2	3	4	5	6	7	8	Final
Saskatchewan (Meachem)	2	1	1	2	0	0	1	X	7
Prince Edward Island (Smith)	0	0	0	0	2	1	0	X	3

Sheet D	1	2	3	4	5	6	7	8	Final
Northern Ontario (Bonot)	0	1	1	0	1	0	1	0	4
Yukon (Miller)	1	0	0	2	0	1	0	1	5

=== Draw 5 ===
Monday, November 6, 6:00 pm

Sheet A	1	2	3	4	5	6	7	8	Final
Northwest Territories (Koe)	0	2	1	1	0	2	0	0	6
British Columbia (de Jong)	2	0	0	0	0	0	2	1	5

Sheet B	1	2	3	4	5	6	7	8	Final
Ontario (McDonald)	1	0	0	1	0	2	0	2	6
Nova Scotia (Flemming)	0	1	0	0	1	0	2	0	4

Sheet C	1	2	3	4	5	6	7	8	Final
New Brunswick (Sullivan)	1	0	0	0	0	2	0	X	3
Alberta (van Amsterdam)	0	2	1	2	2	0	4	X	11

Sheet D	1	2	3	4	5	6	7	8	Final
Quebec (Morissette)	0	4	0	1	0	2	2	0	9
Saskatchewan (Meachem)	3	0	4	0	1	0	0	2	10

=== Draw 6 ===
Tuesday, November 7, 10:00 am

Sheet A	1	2	3	4	5	6	7	8	Final
Newfoundland and Labrador (Ryan)	0	1	0	0	1	1	0	X	3
Alberta (van Amsterdam)	1	0	2	1	0	0	3	X	7

Sheet B	1	2	3	4	5	6	7	8	Final
New Brunswick (Sullivan)	0	1	0	2	0	0	0	X	3
Manitoba (Kurz)	1	0	2	0	0	0	2	X	5

Sheet C	1	2	3	4	5	6	7	8	Final
Ontario (McDonald)	2	0	0	2	2	0	2	X	8
Northern Ontario (Bonot)	0	2	1	0	0	2	0	X	5

Sheet D	1	2	3	4	5	6	7	8	9	Final
Prince Edward Island (Smith)	1	0	0	1	0	2	0	2	0	6
Nova Scotia (Flemming)	0	1	1	0	3	0	1	0	2	8

=== Draw 7 ===
Tuesday, November 7, 2:00 pm

Sheet A	1	2	3	4	5	6	7	8	9	Final
Northern Ontario (Bonot)	0	3	0	3	0	1	0	1	0	8
Quebec (Morissette)	1	0	2	0	2	0	3	0	1	9

Sheet B	1	2	3	4	5	6	7	8	Final
Yukon (Miller)	0	1	0	1	0	0	X	X	2
Saskatchewan (Meachem)	2	0	2	0	3	3	X	X	10

Sheet C	1	2	3	4	5	6	7	8	Final
Nunavut (Van Strien)	0	0	0	0	0	1	X	X	1
British Columbia (de Jong)	2	3	1	4	3	0	X	X	13

Sheet D	1	2	3	4	5	6	7	8	Final
Manitoba (Kurz)	1	0	3	0	2	2	1	X	9
Northwest Territories (Koe)	0	3	0	1	0	0	0	X	4

=== Draw 8 ===
Tuesday, November 7, 6:00 pm

Sheet A	1	2	3	4	5	6	7	8	Final
Prince Edward Island (Smith)	0	1	0	2	0	2	0	X	5
Ontario (McDonald)	1	0	6	0	1	0	1	X	9

Sheet B	1	2	3	4	5	6	7	8	Final
Nunavut (Van Strien)	0	0	0	0	0	1	X	X	1
Alberta (van Amsterdam)	1	2	1	3	3	0	X	X	10

Sheet C	1	2	3	4	5	6	7	8	Final
Yukon (Miller)	0	0	0	0	1	0	X	X	1
Nova Scotia (Flemming)	6	1	1	2	0	0	X	X	10

Sheet D	1	2	3	4	5	6	7	8	Final
Newfoundland and Labrador (Ryan)	0	2	0	1	0	2	0	0	5
New Brunswick (Sullivan)	1	0	2	0	2	0	0	1	6

=== Draw 9 ===
Wednesday, November 8, 10:00 am

Sheet A	1	2	3	4	5	6	7	8	Final
British Columbia (de Jong)	0	0	0	2	0	2	0	X	4
New Brunswick (Sullivan)	2	1	1	0	2	0	2	X	8

Sheet B	1	2	3	4	5	6	7	8	Final
Prince Edward Island (Smith)	0	1	0	0	1	1	0	2	5
Quebec (Morissette)	1	0	0	1	0	0	2	0	4

Sheet C	1	2	3	4	5	6	7	8	Final
Newfoundland and Labrador (Ryan)	0	0	0	0	1	0	0	X	1
Northwest Territories (Koe)	1	3	3	0	0	0	2	X	9

Sheet D	1	2	3	4	5	6	7	8	Final
Saskatchewan (Meachem)	0	2	0	0	2	0	1	1	6
Ontario (McDonald)	2	0	1	0	0	2	0	0	5

=== Draw 10 ===
Wednesday, November 8, 2:00 pm

Sheet A	1	2	3	4	5	6	7	8	Final
Nunavut (Van Strien)	1	0	1	0	1	0	1	X	4
Newfoundland and Labrador (Ryan)	0	3	0	2	0	1	0	X	6

Sheet B	1	2	3	4	5	6	7	8	Final
Nova Scotia (Flemming)	1	0	0	2	0	2	2	X	7
Northern Ontario (Bonot)	0	0	1	0	1	0	0	X	2

Sheet C	1	2	3	4	5	6	7	8	Final
Alberta (van Amsterdam)	0	0	1	0	0	1	0	0	2
Manitoba (Kurz)	0	0	0	0	3	0	1	1	5

Sheet D	1	2	3	4	5	6	7	8	Final
Yukon (Miller)	1	0	0	0	0	0	1	X	2
Prince Edward Island (Smith)	0	0	2	1	4	0	0	X	7

=== Draw 11 ===
Wednesday, November 8, 6:00 pm

Sheet A	1	2	3	4	5	6	7	8	Final
Saskatchewan (Meachem)	1	0	2	0	3	1	4	X	11
Northern Ontario (Bonot)	0	1	0	2	0	0	0	X	3

Sheet B	1	2	3	4	5	6	7	8	Final
Northwest Territories (Koe)	0	2	0	3	1	1	0	X	7
New Brunswick (Sullivan)	1	0	1	0	0	0	2	X	4

Sheet C	1	2	3	4	5	6	7	8	Final
Quebec (Morissette)	1	0	0	3	0	0	0	X	4
Ontario (McDonald)	0	0	2	0	1	1	2	X	6

Sheet D	1	2	3	4	5	6	7	8	Final
British Columbia (de Jong)	0	1	1	0	1	0	0	0	3
Manitoba (Kurz)	3	0	0	1	0	1	1	1	7

== Seeding pool ==
=== Standings ===
Final Seeding Pool Standings

Team	Skip	W	L
Northern Ontario	Trevor Bonot	4	5
British Columbia	Cameron de Jong	4	5
Newfoundland and Labrador	Keith Ryan	3	6
Quebec	Pierre-Luc Morissette	3	6
Nunavut	Peter Van Strien	1	8
Yukon	Terry Miller	1	8

=== Results ===
==== Draw 12 ====
Thursday, November 9, 9:00 am

Sheet A	1	2	3	4	5	6	7	8	Final
British Columbia (de Jong)	0	2	0	0	0	0	X	X	2
Northern Ontario (Bonot)	4	0	0	2	2	1	X	X	9

Sheet B	1	2	3	4	5	6	7	8	Final
Newfoundland and Labrador (Ryan)	2	0	1	3	0	4	X	X	10
Yukon (Miller)	0	2	0	0	1	0	X	X	3

Sheet C	1	2	3	4	5	6	7	8	Final
Nunavut (Van Strien)	1	0	0	1	0	1	0	X	3
Quebec (Morissette)	0	3	1	0	3	0	2	X	9

==== Draw 14 ====
Thursday, November 9, 4:00 pm

Sheet B	1	2	3	4	5	6	7	8	9	Final
Quebec (Morissette)	1	0	1	0	3	0	1	0	0	6
British Columbia (de Jong)	0	1	0	1	0	2	0	2	1	7

Sheet C	1	2	3	4	5	6	7	8	Final
Newfoundland and Labrador (Ryan)	0	0	0	1	0	0	X	X	1
Northern Ontario (Bonot)	3	1	1	0	3	0	X	X	8

Sheet D	1	2	3	4	5	6	7	8	Final
Nunavut (Van Strien)	2	3	0	2	0	0	1	0	8
Yukon (Miller)	0	0	1	0	2	1	0	2	6

==== Draw 17 ====
Friday, November 10, 4:00 pm

Sheet A	1	2	3	4	5	6	7	8	Final
Newfoundland and Labrador (Ryan)	0	1	2	0	2	0	0	2	7
Quebec (Morissette)	2	0	0	1	0	0	2	0	5

Sheet B	1	2	3	4	5	6	7	8	Final
Northern Ontario (Bonot)	0	0	1	0	2	1	3	X	7
Nunavut (Van Strien)	1	1	0	2	0	0	0	X	4

Sheet C	1	2	3	4	5	6	7	8	Final
British Columbia (de Jong)	2	0	2	0	4	0	X	X	8
Yukon (Miller)	0	2	0	1	0	1	X	X	4

== Championship pool ==
=== Standings ===
Final Championship Pool Standings

Key
Teams to Playoffs

Team	Skip	W	L
Saskatchewan	Shaun Meachem	9	1
Manitoba	Kyle Kurz	9	1
Ontario	Scott McDonald	7	3
Nova Scotia	Paul Flemming	7	3
Northwest Territories	Jamie Koe	6	4
Alberta	Evan van Amsterdam	6	4
New Brunswick	Charlie Sullivan	4	6
Prince Edward Island	Tyler Smith	3	7

=== Results ===
==== Draw 13 ====
Thursday, November 9, 12:30 pm

Sheet A	1	2	3	4	5	6	7	8	Final
New Brunswick (Sullivan)	1	0	0	1	0	1	0	0	3
Saskatchewan (Meachem)	0	0	2	0	2	0	0	1	5

Sheet B	1	2	3	4	5	6	7	8	Final
Ontario (McDonald)	0	1	0	2	0	0	X	X	3
Alberta (van Amsterdam)	3	0	3	0	1	2	X	X	9

Sheet C	1	2	3	4	5	6	7	8	Final
Manitoba (Kurz)	1	0	0	3	0	4	0	X	8
Prince Edward Island (Smith)	0	0	1	0	1	0	0	X	2

Sheet D	1	2	3	4	5	6	7	8	Final
Nova Scotia (Flemming)	0	2	0	2	0	2	2	X	8
Northwest Territories (Koe)	1	0	1	0	1	0	0	X	3

==== Draw 15 ====
Thursday, November 9, 7:30 pm

Sheet A	1	2	3	4	5	6	7	8	Final
Prince Edward Island (Smith)	0	0	2	0	0	0	0	X	2
Northwest Territories (Koe)	1	2	0	0	1	1	2	X	7

Sheet B	1	2	3	4	5	6	7	8	Final
Manitoba (Kurz)	0	0	1	0	0	2	2	X	5
Nova Scotia (Flemming)	0	0	0	0	3	0	0	X	3

Sheet C	1	2	3	4	5	6	7	8	Final
Saskatchewan (Meachem)	1	1	0	0	2	4	0	X	8
Alberta (van Amsterdam)	0	0	2	0	0	0	2	X	4

Sheet D	1	2	3	4	5	6	7	8	9	Final
New Brunswick (Sullivan)	0	1	0	0	1	0	0	3	0	5
Ontario (McDonald)	1	0	0	2	0	0	2	0	1	6

==== Draw 16 ====
Friday, November 10, 12:30 pm

Sheet A	1	2	3	4	5	6	7	8	Final
Ontario (McDonald)	0	0	0	2	0	0	1	0	3
Manitoba (Kurz)	0	1	0	0	1	1	0	1	4

Sheet B	1	2	3	4	5	6	7	8	Final
Northwest Territories (Koe)	0	0	1	0	1	0	2	0	4
Saskatchewan (Meachem)	0	1	0	1	0	3	0	3	8

Sheet C	1	2	3	4	5	6	7	8	Final
Nova Scotia (Flemming)	0	1	0	1	0	3	0	1	6
New Brunswick (Sullivan)	1	0	1	0	1	0	1	0	4

Sheet D	1	2	3	4	5	6	7	8	Final
Alberta (van Amsterdam)	0	1	0	3	0	0	2	0	6
Prince Edward Island (Smith)	1	0	3	0	0	4	0	1	9

==== Draw 18 ====
Friday, November 10, 7:30 pm

Sheet A	1	2	3	4	5	6	7	8	Final
Alberta (van Amsterdam)	2	0	4	1	0	0	1	X	8
Nova Scotia (Flemming)	0	1	0	0	2	1	0	X	4

Sheet B	1	2	3	4	5	6	7	8	Final
Prince Edward Island (Smith)	0	2	0	1	0	1	0	X	4
New Brunswick (Sullivan)	0	0	2	0	1	0	3	X	6

Sheet C	1	2	3	4	5	6	7	8	Final
Northwest Territories (Koe)	0	0	2	0	0	1	0	X	3
Ontario (McDonald)	1	0	0	4	1	0	3	X	9

Sheet D	1	2	3	4	5	6	7	8	Final
Saskatchewan (Meachem)	4	0	2	0	0	5	X	X	11
Manitoba (Kurz)	0	1	0	1	0	0	X	X	2

== Playoffs ==
Semifinals
1	Saskatchewan	9
4	Nova Scotia	4
2	Manitoba	6
3	Ontario	5

Final
1	Saskatchewan	6
2	Manitoba	4
Third place
4	Nova Scotia	3
3	Ontario	8

=== Semifinals ===
Saturday, November 11, 10:00 am

Sheet B	1	2	3	4	5	6	7	8	9	Final
Manitoba (Kurz)	1	0	2	0	1	0	1	0	1	6
Ontario (McDonald)	0	1	0	1	0	1	0	2	0	5

Sheet C	1	2	3	4	5	6	7	8	Final
Saskatchewan (Meachem)	2	1	1	0	4	0	1	X	9
Nova Scotia (Flemming)	0	0	0	1	0	3	0	X	4

=== Bronze medal game ===
Saturday, November 11, 2:30 pm

Sheet C	1	2	3	4	5	6	7	8	Final
Nova Scotia (Flemming)	0	0	1	1	0	1	0	X	3
Ontario (McDonald)	0	3	0	0	4	0	1	X	8

=== Final ===
Saturday, November 11, 2:30 pm

Sheet B	1	2	3	4	5	6	7	8	Final
Saskatchewan (Meachem)	2	0	0	0	0	2	0	2	6
Manitoba (Kurz)	0	0	0	1	1	0	2	0	4
