= 2021 Canadian Mixed Curling Championship =

- Host city: Canmore, Alberta
- Arena: Canmore Golf & Curling Club
- Dates: November 7–14
- Winner: Quebec
- Curling club: CC Etchemin, Saint-Romuald & Curling des Collines, Chelsea
- Skip: Jean-Michel Ménard
- Third: Marie-France Larouche
- Second: Ian Belleau
- Lead: Annie Lemay
- Finalist: Ontario

The 2021 Canadian Mixed Curling Championship was held from November 7 to 14 at the Canmore Golf & Curling Club in Canmore, Alberta.

In a battle of Ottawa-area skips in the final, Quebec skipped by Jean-Michel Ménard from Gatineau, defeated Ontario's Mike McLean rink out of the Ottawa Curling Club in an extra end. It was Quebec's third mixed title, second in a row, and second for Ménard, who last won in 2001.

The event was originally intended to be played in November 2020 (but billed as the 2021 event, as part of the 2020–21 curling season) in Canmore, but was cancelled. The 2021–22 edition of the event retained its 2021 branding to reflect the calendar year it was played in.

== Teams ==
The teams are listed as follows:

Team	Skip	Third	Second	Lead	Locale
Alberta	Craig MacAlpine	Hannah Phillips	Braden Pelech	Brenna Bilassy	Granite Curling Club, Edmonton
British Columbia	Sébastien Robillard	Karla Thompson	Nathan Small	Amanda Guido	Kamloops Curling Club, Kamloops
Manitoba	Alex Forrest	Brandi Forrest	Tyler Forrest	D'Arcy Forrest	Assiniboine Memorial Curling Club, Winnipeg
New Brunswick	James Grattan	Jillian Babin	Jamie Brannen	Jaclyn Tingley	Capital Winter Club, Fredericton
Newfoundland and Labrador	Keith Ryan	Marcie Brown	Zach Young	Sheryl Morris	Carol Curling Club, Labrador City
Northern Ontario	Trevor Bonot	Jackie McCormick	Mike McCarville	Amanda Gates	Fort William Curling Club, Thunder Bay
Northwest Territories	Jamie Koe	Margot Flemming	Cole Parsons	Megan Koehler	Yellowknife Curling Centre, Yellowknife
Nova Scotia	Craig Burgess	Colleen Pinkney	Todd Burgess	Shelley MacNutt	Truro Curling Club, Truro
Nunavut	Peter Van Strien	Meridith Penner	Greg Howard	Lena Chown	Iqaluit Curling Club, Iqaluit
Ontario	Mike McLean	Erin Morrissey	Kevin Tippett	Erica Hopson	Ottawa Curling Club, Ottawa
Prince Edward Island	Jamie Newson	Melissa Morrow	Andrew MacDougall	Miranda Ellis	Silver Fox Curling Club, Summerside
Quebec	Jean-Michel Ménard	Marie-France Larouche	Ian Belleau	Annie Lemay	Club de curling Etchemin, Saint-Romuald & Curling des Collines, Chelsea
Saskatchewan	Dean Grindheim	Sherry Just	Cole Tenetuik	Alison Ingram	Twin Rivers Curling Club, North Battleford
Yukon	Terry Miller	Laini Klassen	Brayden Klassen	Shani Rittel	Whitehorse Curling Club, Whitehorse

== Round-robin standings ==
Final round-robin standings

Key
Teams to Championship Pool

Pool A	Skip	W	L	W–L
Quebec	Jean-Michel Ménard	5	1	1–1
Northern Ontario	Trevor Bonot	5	1	1–1
Northwest Territories	Jamie Koe	5	1	1–1
Manitoba	Alex Forrest	3	3	–
Nova Scotia	Craig Burgess	2	4	–
Alberta	Craig MacAlpine	1	5	–
Nunavut	Peter Van Strien	0	6	–

Pool B	Skip	W	L	W–L
Ontario	Mike McLean	5	1	–
Saskatchewan	Dean Grindheim	4	2	1–1
British Columbia	Sébastien Robillard	4	2	1–1
New Brunswick	James Grattan	4	2	1–1
Newfoundland and Labrador	Keith Ryan	2	4	–
Yukon	Terry Miller	1	5	1–0
Prince Edward Island	Jamie Newson	1	5	0–1

== Round-robin results ==
All draws are listed in Mountain Standard Time (UTC−07:00).

=== Draw 1 ===
Sunday, November 7, 2:00 pm

Sheet 2	1	2	3	4	5	6	7	8	Final
Northwest Territories (Koe)	0	2	0	0	2	0	1	3	8
Quebec (Ménard)	1	0	1	0	0	1	0	0	3

Sheet 3	1	2	3	4	5	6	7	8	Final
Northern Ontario (Bonot)	0	2	2	5	0	1	1	X	11
Alberta (MacAlpine)	2	0	0	0	3	0	0	X	5

Sheet 4	1	2	3	4	5	6	7	8	Final
Nunavut (Van Strien)	0	1	0	1	0	0	X	X	2
Nova Scotia (Burgess)	5	0	1	0	7	0	X	X	13

=== Draw 2 ===
Sunday, November 7, 6:00 pm

Sheet 2	1	2	3	4	5	6	7	8	Final
Ontario (McLean)	3	1	0	5	0	1	X	X	10
Yukon (Miller)	0	0	1	0	1	0	X	X	2

Sheet 3	1	2	3	4	5	6	7	8	Final
New Brunswick (Grattan)	0	0	2	0	0	2	2	0	6
Newfoundland and Labrador (Ryan)	1	1	0	1	1	0	0	1	5

Sheet 4	1	2	3	4	5	6	7	8	Final
Saskatchewan (Grindheim)	0	4	2	3	2	0	X	X	11
Prince Edward Island (Newson)	1	0	0	0	0	1	X	X	2

=== Draw 3 ===
Monday, November 8, 9:00 am

Sheet 2	1	2	3	4	5	6	7	8	Final
Nova Scotia (Burgess)	0	1	0	0	1	0	X	X	2
Northern Ontario (Bonot)	5	0	1	3	0	1	X	X	10

Sheet 3	1	2	3	4	5	6	7	8	Final
Northwest Territories (Koe)	2	0	5	0	2	0	1	X	10
Nunavut (Van Strien)	0	1	0	1	0	1	0	X	3

Sheet 4	1	2	3	4	5	6	7	8	Final
Alberta (MacAlpine)	2	0	1	0	2	0	1	0	6
Manitoba (Forrest)	0	2	0	3	0	3	0	1	9

=== Draw 4 ===
Monday, November 8, 12:30 pm

Sheet 2	1	2	3	4	5	6	7	8	Final
Saskatchewan (Grindheim)	0	0	1	0	1	0	2	0	4
New Brunswick (Grattan)	1	1	0	1	0	1	0	1	5

Sheet 3	1	2	3	4	5	6	7	8	Final
Ontario (McLean)	3	0	4	1	0	2	X	X	10
Prince Edward Island (Newson)	0	1	0	0	2	0	X	X	3

Sheet 4	1	2	3	4	5	6	7	8	Final
British Columbia (Robillard)	0	0	2	1	1	0	0	1	5
Newfoundland and Labrador (Ryan)	0	2	0	0	0	0	1	0	3

=== Draw 5 ===
Monday, November 8, 4:00 pm

Sheet 2	1	2	3	4	5	6	7	8	Final
Northern Ontario (Bonot)	1	0	1	0	2	2	2	X	8
Manitoba (Forrest)	0	1	0	0	0	0	0	X	1

Sheet 3	1	2	3	4	5	6	7	8	Final
Nunavut (Van Strien)	0	0	0	1	0	1	X	X	2
Quebec (Ménard)	2	4	3	0	2	0	X	X	11

Sheet 4	1	2	3	4	5	6	7	8	Final
Nova Scotia (Burgess)	0	3	0	0	0	0	2	1	6
Northwest Territories (Koe)	1	0	3	1	1	1	0	0	7

=== Draw 6 ===
Monday, November 8, 7:30 pm

Sheet 2	1	2	3	4	5	6	7	8	Final
New Brunswick (Grattan)	1	0	0	2	0	0	0	X	3
British Columbia (Robillard)	0	2	0	0	2	0	1	X	5

Sheet 3	1	2	3	4	5	6	7	8	Final
Prince Edward Island (Newson)	0	0	1	0	0	0	1	X	2
Yukon (Miller)	1	2	0	1	1	1	0	X	6

Sheet 4	1	2	3	4	5	6	7	8	Final
Ontario (McLean)	0	0	2	0	1	0	1	X	4
Saskatchewan (Grindheim)	4	2	0	1	0	1	0	X	8

=== Draw 7 ===
Tuesday, November 9, 9:00 am

Sheet 2	1	2	3	4	5	6	7	8	Final
Alberta (MacAlpine)	5	0	0	1	0	3	X	X	9
Nunavut (Van Strien)	0	1	0	0	1	0	X	X	2

Sheet 3	1	2	3	4	5	6	7	8	Final
Manitoba (Forrest)	2	3	0	0	1	0	3	X	9
Nova Scotia (Burgess)	0	0	2	1	0	2	0	X	5

Sheet 4	1	2	3	4	5	6	7	8	Final
Northern Ontario (Bonot)	1	0	0	0	1	1	0	X	3
Quebec (Ménard)	0	2	1	1	0	0	2	X	6

=== Draw 8 ===
Tuesday, November 9, 12:30 pm

Sheet 2	1	2	3	4	5	6	7	8	Final
Newfoundland and Labrador (Ryan)	0	4	0	1	0	1	0	X	6
Prince Edward Island (Newson)	2	0	2	0	1	0	4	X	9

Sheet 3	1	2	3	4	5	6	7	8	Final
British Columbia (Robillard)	0	0	0	1	1	0	1	X	3
Saskatchewan (Grindheim)	1	2	1	0	0	1	0	X	5

Sheet 4	1	2	3	4	5	6	7	8	Final
Yukon (Miller)	0	0	0	1	1	0	1	X	3
New Brunswick (Grattan)	4	1	1	0	0	1	0	X	7

=== Draw 9 ===
Tuesday, November 9, 4:00 pm

Sheet 2	1	2	3	4	5	6	7	8	Final
Manitoba (Forrest)	0	0	2	0	0	1	0	X	3
Northwest Territories (Koe)	1	2	0	3	1	0	1	X	8

Sheet 3	1	2	3	4	5	6	7	8	Final
Nunavut (Van Strien)	0	0	0	0	0	1	X	X	1
Northern Ontario (Bonot)	2	1	2	1	4	0	X	X	10

Sheet 4	1	2	3	4	5	6	7	8	Final
Quebec (Ménard)	1	0	0	1	0	1	0	1	4
Alberta (MacAlpine)	0	0	2	0	0	0	1	0	3

=== Draw 10 ===
Tuesday, November 9, 7:30 pm

Sheet 2	1	2	3	4	5	6	7	8	Final
Yukon (Miller)	0	0	1	0	0	1	0	X	2
Saskatchewan (Grindheim)	1	1	0	1	1	0	7	X	11

Sheet 3	1	2	3	4	5	6	7	8	Final
Newfoundland and Labrador (Ryan)	2	0	0	0	0	0	X	X	2
Ontario (McLean)	0	2	1	1	3	3	X	X	10

Sheet 4	1	2	3	4	5	6	7	8	Final
Prince Edward Island (Newson)	0	0	1	0	0	2	X	X	3
British Columbia (Robillard)	1	1	0	6	2	0	X	X	10

=== Draw 11 ===
Wednesday, November 10, 9:00 am

Sheet 2	1	2	3	4	5	6	7	8	Final
Quebec (Ménard)	1	0	2	0	1	0	1	0	5
Nova Scotia (Burgess)	0	1	0	1	0	1	0	1	4

Sheet 3	1	2	3	4	5	6	7	8	Final
Northwest Territories (Koe)	0	1	0	2	3	0	0	X	6
Alberta (MacAlpine)	1	0	0	0	0	1	1	X	3

Sheet 4	1	2	3	4	5	6	7	8	Final
Manitoba (Forrest)	0	2	0	3	2	0	0	1	8
Nunavut (Van Strien)	1	0	1	0	0	1	1	0	4

=== Draw 12 ===
Wednesday, November 10, 12:30 pm

Sheet 2	1	2	3	4	5	6	7	8	Final
British Columbia (Robillard)	1	0	0	0	2	0	0	0	3
Ontario (McLean)	0	0	2	1	0	1	1	1	6

Sheet 3	1	2	3	4	5	6	7	8	Final
Prince Edward Island (Newson)	0	0	2	0	2	0	2	0	6
New Brunswick (Grattan)	3	2	0	2	0	1	0	1	9

Sheet 4	1	2	3	4	5	6	7	8	Final
Newfoundland and Labrador (Ryan)	0	3	2	0	2	2	0	X	9
Yukon (Miller)	1	0	0	2	0	0	1	X	4

=== Draw 13 ===
Wednesday, November 10, 4:00 pm

Sheet 2	1	2	3	4	5	6	7	8	Final
Northwest Territories (Koe)	1	0	0	0	2	0	0	0	3
Northern Ontario (Bonot)	0	0	1	1	0	1	0	1	4

Sheet 3	1	2	3	4	5	6	7	8	Final
Quebec (Ménard)	0	0	2	0	2	0	5	X	9
Manitoba (Forrest)	0	1	0	2	0	1	0	X	4

Sheet 4	1	2	3	4	5	6	7	8	Final
Nova Scotia (Burgess)	0	4	0	0	2	0	1	X	7
Alberta (MacAlpine)	0	0	1	1	0	2	0	X	4

=== Draw 14 ===
Wednesday, November 10, 7:30 pm

Sheet 2	1	2	3	4	5	6	7	8	9	Final
Saskatchewan (Grindheim)	1	0	2	0	1	0	0	1	0	5
Newfoundland and Labrador (Ryan)	0	1	0	1	0	1	2	0	1	6

Sheet 3	1	2	3	4	5	6	7	8	Final
Yukon (Miller)	0	1	0	2	0	1	0	X	4
British Columbia (Robillard)	2	0	3	0	2	0	1	X	8

Sheet 4	1	2	3	4	5	6	7	8	Final
New Brunswick (Grattan)	0	0	0	1	0	1	2	0	4
Ontario (McLean)	0	1	0	0	1	0	0	3	5

== Placement round ==
=== Seeding pool ===
==== Standings ====
Final Seeding Pool Standings

Team	Skip	W	L	W–L
Nova Scotia	Craig Burgess	5	4	–
Alberta	Craig MacAlpine	3	6	1–1
Newfoundland and Labrador	Keith Ryan	3	6	1–1
Yukon	Terry Miller	3	6	1–1
Prince Edward Island	Jamie Newson	2	7	–
Nunavut	Peter Van Strien	0	9	–

==== Results ====
===== Draw 15 =====
Thursday, November 11, 10:00 am

Sheet 2	1	2	3	4	5	6	7	8	Final
Nova Scotia (Burgess)	0	0	2	0	3	0	0	1	6
Prince Edward Island (Newson)	0	2	0	1	0	1	1	0	5

Sheet 3	1	2	3	4	5	6	7	8	Final
Yukon (Miller)	1	0	3	0	0	0	1	2	7
Alberta (MacAlpine)	0	1	0	1	2	1	0	0	5

Sheet 4	1	2	3	4	5	6	7	8	Final
Nunavut (Van Strien)	1	1	0	0	2	0	1	X	5
Newfoundland and Labrador (Ryan)	0	0	3	3	0	3	0	X	9

===== Draw 18 =====
Friday, November 12, 10:00 am

Sheet 2	1	2	3	4	5	6	7	8	Final
Nunavut (Van Strien)	0	0	2	0	1	0	X	X	3
Yukon (Miller)	2	4	0	1	0	4	X	X	11

Sheet 4	1	2	3	4	5	6	7	8	Final
Newfoundland and Labrador (Ryan)	0	0	0	2	0	1	0	0	3
Nova Scotia (Burgess)	0	1	0	0	1	0	1	1	4

===== Draw 19 =====
Friday, November 12, 2:00 pm

Sheet 3	1	2	3	4	5	6	7	8	Final
Alberta (MacAlpine)	3	0	2	0	0	3	0	X	8
Prince Edward Island (Newson)	0	1	0	0	1	0	3	X	5

===== Draw 20 =====
Friday, November 12, 7:00 pm

Sheet 4	1	2	3	4	5	6	7	8	Final
Nova Scotia (Burgess)	1	0	3	0	4	1	0	X	9
Yukon (Miller)	0	2	0	2	0	0	1	X	5

===== Draw 21 =====
Saturday, November 13, 10:00 am

Sheet 2	1	2	3	4	5	6	7	8	Final
Alberta (MacAlpine)	0	1	0	2	1	0	1	1	6
Newfoundland and Labrador (Ryan)	1	0	2	0	0	1	0	0	4

Sheet 3	1	2	3	4	5	6	7	8	Final
Prince Edward Island (Newson)	0	0	2	3	1	1	1	X	8
Nunavut (Van Strien)	1	0	0	0	0	0	0	X	1

=== Championship pool ===
==== Standings ====
Final Championship Pool Standings

Key
Teams to Playoffs

Team	Skip	W	L	W–L
Northwest Territories	Jamie Koe	9	1	–
Ontario	Mike McLean	7	3	2–0
New Brunswick	James Grattan	7	3	1–1
Quebec	Jean-Michel Ménard	7	3	0–2
Northern Ontario	Trevor Bonot	6	4	–
Manitoba	Alex Forrest	5	5	2–0
Saskatchewan	Dean Grindheim	5	5	1–1
British Columbia	Sébastien Robillard	5	5	0–2

==== Results ====
===== Draw 16 =====
Thursday, November 11, 2:00 pm

Sheet 2	1	2	3	4	5	6	7	8	Final
Northwest Territories (Koe)	1	0	0	1	0	3	1	1	7
Saskatchewan (Grindheim)	0	2	0	0	3	0	0	0	5

Sheet 3	1	2	3	4	5	6	7	8	Final
Manitoba (Forrest)	1	0	0	0	1	0	1	X	3
Ontario (McLean)	0	0	2	2	0	3	0	X	7

Sheet 4	1	2	3	4	5	6	7	8	9	Final
Quebec (Ménard)	0	1	0	0	0	2	0	1	0	4
New Brunswick (Grattan)	0	0	1	1	0	0	2	0	1	5

===== Draw 17 =====
Thursday, November 11, 7:00 pm

Sheet 2	1	2	3	4	5	6	7	8	Final
Ontario (McLean)	0	0	0	0	0	0	0	X	0
Northwest Territories (Koe)	0	2	1	2	1	0	1	X	7

Sheet 3	1	2	3	4	5	6	7	8	Final
British Columbia (Robillard)	0	0	1	1	0	2	0	1	5
Northern Ontario (Bonot)	0	2	0	0	0	0	1	0	3

Sheet 4	1	2	3	4	5	6	7	8	Final
Saskatchewan (Grindheim)	0	0	2	0	2	0	0	1	5
Manitoba (Forrest)	1	0	0	1	0	2	2	0	6

===== Draw 19 =====
Friday, November 12, 2:00 pm

Sheet 2	1	2	3	4	5	6	7	8	Final
Northern Ontario (Bonot)	0	0	0	0	0	0	1	X	1
New Brunswick (Grattan)	0	0	1	0	3	0	0	X	4

Sheet 4	1	2	3	4	5	6	7	8	Final
British Columbia (Robillard)	0	0	0	0	0	1	X	X	1
Quebec (Ménard)	4	2	2	2	0	0	X	X	10

===== Draw 20 =====
Friday, November 12, 7:00 pm

Sheet 2	1	2	3	4	5	6	7	8	Final
Northern Ontario (Bonot)	1	2	0	2	0	0	3	X	8
Ontario (McLean)	0	0	1	0	1	1	0	X	3

Sheet 3	1	2	3	4	5	6	7	8	Final
Quebec (Ménard)	0	1	0	2	0	2	0	1	6
Saskatchewan (Grindheim)	1	0	1	0	1	0	1	0	4

===== Draw 22 =====
Saturday, November 13, 2:00 pm

Sheet 2	1	2	3	4	5	6	7	8	Final
Manitoba (Forrest)	0	0	0	2	2	1	0	X	5
British Columbia (Robillard)	0	1	0	0	0	0	1	X	2

Sheet 3	1	2	3	4	5	6	7	8	Final
Ontario (McLean)	1	1	0	1	0	0	2	1	6
Quebec (Ménard)	0	0	2	0	2	0	0	0	4

Sheet 4	1	2	3	4	5	6	7	8	Final
Northwest Territories (Koe)	1	0	0	2	0	1	1	0	5
New Brunswick (Grattan)	0	1	1	0	0	0	0	1	3

===== Draw 23 =====
Saturday, November 13, 7:00 pm

Sheet 2	1	2	3	4	5	6	7	8	9	Final
New Brunswick (Grattan)	0	3	0	0	3	0	2	0	1	9
Manitoba (Forrest)	1	0	3	1	0	1	0	2	0	8

Sheet 3	1	2	3	4	5	6	7	8	Final
British Columbia (Robillard)	0	0	0	0	0	0	3	X	3
Northwest Territories (Koe)	1	2	1	1	0	1	0	X	6

Sheet 4	1	2	3	4	5	6	7	8	9	Final
Saskatchewan (Grindheim)	3	0	0	0	0	2	0	0	1	6
Northern Ontario (Bonot)	0	1	2	0	1	0	0	1	0	5

== Playoffs ==
Semifinals
1	Northwest Territories	4
4	Quebec	6
2	Ontario	6
3	New Brunswick	5

Final
4	Quebec	5
2	Ontario	4

Bronze medal game
1	Northwest Territories	8
3	New Brunswick	3

=== Semifinals ===
Sunday, November 14, 9:30 am

Sheet 2	1	2	3	4	5	6	7	8	Final
Northwest Territories (Koe)	0	1	0	1	0	1	1	0	4
Quebec (Ménard)	0	0	3	0	1	0	0	2	6

Sheet 3	1	2	3	4	5	6	7	8	Final
Ontario (McLean)	0	0	1	0	4	0	1	0	6
New Brunswick (Grattan)	0	0	0	2	0	2	0	1	5

=== Bronze medal game ===
Sunday, November 14, 2:00 pm

Sheet 3	1	2	3	4	5	6	7	8	Final
Northwest Territories (Koe)	4	1	0	1	0	2	X	X	8
New Brunswick (Grattan)	0	0	1	0	2	0	X	X	3

=== Final ===
Sunday, November 14, 2:00 pm

Sheet 2	1	2	3	4	5	6	7	8	9	Final
Quebec (Ménard)	0	0	2	0	1	1	0	0	1	5
Ontario (McLean)	1	0	0	2	0	0	0	1	0	4
