= Trevor Bonot =

Canadian curler (born 1985)

- Curler
- Born: Trevor Nevin Marcel Bonot; Fort Frances, Ontario

Team
- Curling club: Fort William CC, Thunder Bay, ON
- Skip: Trevor Bonot
- Third: Kory Carr
- Second: Chris Briand
- Lead: Dylan Johnston
- Mixed doubles partner: Jackie McCormick

Curling career
- Member Association: Northern Ontario
- Brier: 1 (2024)
- World Mixed Championship: 1 (2017)
- Other appearances: CMCC: 5 (2017, 2019, 2021, 2022, 2023); CMDCC: 3 (2018, 2021, 2024)
- Top CTRS ranking: 38th (2023–24)
Medal record
Curling
Representing Canada
World Mixed Curling Championship
Silver medal – second place	2017 Champéry

Trevor Nevin Marcel Bonot (born May 27, 1985) is a Canadian curler who lives in Thunder Bay, Ontario. Bonot was raised in Stratton, Ontario. Bonot played for Team Canada and won a medal at a World Mixed Curling Championships (2017).

== Curling career ==
=== Men's ===
At the 2023 Northern Ontario Men's Provincial Curling Championship, team Bonot finished 3rd in Northern Ontario, beating Olympic Gold Medallist Brad Jacobs in the A-Final.

Bonot also competes in the TBaytel Major League of Curling, capturing the title in 2018. and 2024.

2023-2024, Team Bonot qualified for two events, the St. Paul Cashspiel and Challenge de Curling Desjardins. Team Bonot won the 2024 Northern Ontario Men's Provincial Curling Championship in Little Current, Ontario.

=== Mixed ===
Bonot has won five Northern Ontario Mixed Championships, all with his sister Jackie McCormick at third. Bonot won a Gold medal at the 2017 Canadian Mixed Curling Championship defeating team Manitoba in the final. Almost a year later, Team Bonot represented Canada and came home with a silver medal at the 2017 World Mixed Curling Championships in Champéry, Switzerland. Bonot won the 2019 Northern Ontario Mixed Championships but failed to make the championship pool at the 2019 Canadian Mixed Curling Championship. In 2021, Bonot won the Northern Ontario Mixed Championship. Team Bonot went to the National Championship in Canmore, Alberta and finished out of the playoffs of the 2021 Canadian Mixed Curling Championships. In 2022, Bonot won a fourth Provincial Mixed Championship in North Bay, Ontario; Team Bonot went to Prince Albert, Saskatchewan for the national event. Bonot made the final of the 2022 Canadian Mixed Curling Championship but left Prince Albert, with a silver medal.

In April 2023, Team Bonot won their third provincial mixed title in a row defeating Dylan Johnston in the Northern Ontario final. Bonot finished out of the Playoffs at the 2023 Canadian Mixed Curling Championship with a 4-5 record.

Bonot has been presented with the Sportsmanship Award at the Canadian Mixed. (2017, 2019)

=== Mixed doubles ===
Bonot has won two Northern Ontario Mixed Doubles Curling Championships. He competed with Amanda Gates at the 2018 Canadian Mixed Doubles Curling Championship held in Leduc, Alberta. Bonot won the Northern Ontario Provincial title in 2020 with Oye-Sem Won but did not play in the 2020 Canadian Mixed Doubles Curling Championship as the event was cancelled due to the onset of COVID-19. The next year, they were selected by the Northern Ontario Curling Association to represent Northern Ontario at the "Calgary bubble" in the 2021 Canadian Mixed Doubles Curling Championship. The team beat former Olympic Champion, Kaitlyn Lawes (who was partnered with her nephew, Connor) in the first game.

In January 2024, Trevor and Jackie McCormick won the 2024 NOCA Mixed Doubles Championship in Stratton, ON.

=== Honours ===
In September 2022, Team Bonot was inducted into the Northwestern Ontario Sports Hall of Fame.

== Teams ==
=== Men's ===
Season	Skip	Third	Second	Lead	Coach/Alternate
2010–2011	Trevor Clifford	Aaron Skillen	Trevor Bonot	Mike George	
2011–2012	Trevor Bonot	Al Macsemchuk	Scott McCallum	Tim Jewett	Andy McCormick
2012–2013	Trevor Bonot	Al Macsemchuk	Chris Briand	Mike Badiuk/Brady Trottier	Tim Jewett
2013–2014	Trevor Bonot	Al Macsemchuk	Chris Briand	Tim Jewett	
2014–2015	Trevor Bonot	Kory Carr	Jordan Potts	Joel Adams	
2017–2018	Al Hackner	Trevor Bonot	Jamie Childs	Gary Champagne	
2018–2019	Trevor Bonot	Al Hackner	Jamie Childs	Gary Champagne	Mike Desilets
2019–2020	Jordan Chandler	Trevor Bonot	Nick Bissonette	Kyle Chandler	Tom Cull
2021–2022	Trevor Bonot	Mike McCarville	Jordan Potter	Jordan Potts	Mike Assad
2022–2023	Trevor Bonot	Mike McCarville	Jordan Potts	Kurtis Byrd	Al Hackner
2023–2024	Trevor Bonot	Mike McCarville	Jordan Potts	Kurtis Byrd	Al Hackner
2024–2025	Trevor Bonot	Mike McCarville	Jordan Potts	Kurtis Byrd	Al Hackner
2025–2026	Trevor Bonot	Mike McCarville	Jordan Potts	Jamie Childs	Al Hackner
2026–2027	Trevor Bonot	Kory Carr	Chris Briand	Dylan Johnston	

=== Mixed ===
Season	Skip	Third	Second	Lead
2017	Trevor Bonot	Jackie McCormick	Kory Carr	Megan Carr
2019	Trevor Bonot	Jackie McCormick	Mike McCarville	Angela Lee-Wiwcharyk
2021	Trevor Bonot	Jackie McCormick	Mike McCarville	Amanda Gates
2022	Trevor Bonot	Jackie McCormick	Mike McCarville	Amanda Gates
2023	Trevor Bonot	Jackie McCormick	Mike McCarville	Amanda Gates

== Personal life ==
Bonot lives in Thunder Bay, and is a wealth advisor with National Bank Financial Wealth Management.

He was the Grand Marshall of the 2019 Borderland Pride March in Fort Frances, Ontario and International Falls, Minnesota. He is gay.

Bonot sits on the Board of the Northern Ontario Curling Association.

== Education ==
Bonot graduated from Rainy River High School in 2003 before moving to Thunder Bay to attend Lakehead University. Bonot graduated with an HBa in Sociology in 2008.
