= 2022 Canadian Mixed Curling Championship =

- Host city: Prince Albert, Saskatchewan
- Arena: Prince Albert Golf & Curling Centre
- Dates: November 6–12
- Winner: Quebec
- Curling club: Glenmore CC, Dollard-des-Ormeaux
- Skip: Félix Asselin
- Third: Laurie St-Georges
- Second: Émile Asselin
- Lead: Emily Riley
- Finalist: Northern Ontario (Bonot)

The 2022 Canadian Mixed Curling Championship was held from November 6 to 12 at the Prince Albert Golf & Curling Centre in Prince Albert, Saskatchewan.

Quebec won the event, defeating Northern Ontario in the final. It was the third straight championship for the province. Team Quebec consisted of skip Félix Asselin, his girlfriend Laurie St-Georges at third, Asselin's brother Émile at second, and Emily Riley at lead. The team went on to represent Canada at the 2023 World Mixed Curling Championship. Quebec's win marked the first time a province won three straight national curling championships with different teams since Manitoba won the 1931 Macdonald Brier.

== Teams ==
The teams are listed as follows:

Team	Skip	Third	Second	Lead	Locale
Alberta	Morgan Muise	Brad Kokoroyannis	Shana Snell	Ky Macaulay	Calgary Curling Club, Calgary & Cochrane Curling Club, Cochrane
British Columbia	Miles Craig	Stephanie Jackson-Baier	Chris Baier	Carley Sandwith-Craig	Victoria Curling Club, Victoria & Duncan Curling Club, Duncan
Manitoba	Corey Chambers	Lisa McLeod	Nigel Milnes	Jolene Callum	Miami Curling Club, Miami
New Brunswick	Grant Odishaw	Shaelyn Park	Samuel Forestell	Krista Flanagan	Curl Moncton, Moncton
Newfoundland and Labrador	William Butler	Erin Porter	Nicholas Codner	Brooke Godsland	Caribou Curling Club, Stephenville & RE/MAX Centre, St. John's
Northern Ontario	Trevor Bonot	Jackie McCormick	Mike McCarville	Amanda Gates	Fort William Curling Club, Thunder Bay
Northwest Territories	Jamie Koe	Margot Flemming	Cole Parsons	Megan Koehler	Yellowknife Curling Centre, Yellowknife
Nova Scotia	Paul Flemming	Marie Christianson	Scott Saccary	Marlee Powers	Halifax Curling Club, Halifax
Nunavut	Peter Mackey	Geneva Chislett	Jeff Nadeau	Robyn Mackey	Iqaluit Curling Club, Iqaluit
Ontario	Scott McDonald	Lori Eddy	Matthew Hall	Laura Neil	St. Thomas Curling Club, St. Thomas
Prince Edward Island	Dennis Watts	Jaclyn Reid	Terry Arsenault	Alison Griffin	Silver Fox Curling Club, Summerside
Quebec	Félix Asselin	Laurie St-Georges	Émile Asselin	Emily Riley	Glenmore Curling Club, Dollard-des-Ormeaux
Saskatchewan	Shaun Meachem	Kelly Schafer	Chris Haichert	Teejay Haichert	Swift Current Curling Club, Swift Current
Yukon	Terry Miller	Laini Klassen	Peter Andersen	Laura Wilson	Whitehorse Curling Club, Whitehorse

== Round-robin standings ==
Final round-robin standings

Key
Teams to Championship Pool

Pool A	Skip	W	L
Quebec	Félix Asselin	5	1
British Columbia	Miles Craig	4	2
New Brunswick	Grant Odishaw	4	2
Saskatchewan	Shaun Meachem	3	3
Alberta	Morgan Muise	2	4
Yukon	Terry Miller	2	4
Nunavut	Peter Mackey	1	5

Pool B	Skip	W	L
Northwest Territories	Jamie Koe	5	1
Ontario	Scott McDonald	4	2
Nova Scotia	Paul Flemming	4	2
Northern Ontario	Trevor Bonot	4	2
Manitoba	Corey Chambers	2	4
Newfoundland and Labrador	William Butler	1	5
Prince Edward Island	Dennis Watts	1	5

== Round-robin results ==
All draws are listed in Central Time (UTC−05:00).

=== Draw 1 ===
Sunday, November 6, 1:00 pm

Sheet A	1	2	3	4	5	6	7	8	Final
Alberta (Muise)	0	0	0	0	1	1	0	X	2
Saskatchewan (Meachem) 🔨	0	2	1	1	0	0	1	X	5

Sheet B	1	2	3	4	5	6	7	8	Final
Quebec (Asselin) 🔨	2	0	1	1	1	2	X	X	7
Nunavut (Mackey)	0	1	0	0	0	0	X	X	1

Sheet D	1	2	3	4	5	6	7	8	9	Final
Ontario (McDonald) 🔨	0	1	0	2	0	2	0	1	0	6
Prince Edward Island (Watts)	1	0	2	0	2	0	1	0	1	7

=== Draw 2 ===
Sunday, November 6, 6:00 pm

Sheet A	1	2	3	4	5	6	7	8	Final
New Brunswick (Odishaw) 🔨	2	0	1	2	0	4	X	X	9
Nunavut (Mackey)	0	1	0	0	1	0	X	X	2

Sheet B	1	2	3	4	5	6	7	8	Final
Northern Ontario (Bonot)	1	0	2	0	0	1	0	X	4
Nova Scotia (Flemming) 🔨	0	3	0	1	1	0	1	X	6

Sheet C	1	2	3	4	5	6	7	8	Final
Manitoba (Chambers) 🔨	2	0	4	1	0	0	0	0	7
Prince Edward Island (Watts)	0	2	0	0	1	1	1	1	6

=== Draw 3 ===
Monday, November 7, 10:00 am

Sheet A	1	2	3	4	5	6	7	8	Final
Northern Ontario (Bonot) 🔨	2	1	2	0	0	3	0	X	8
Manitoba (Chambers)	0	0	0	0	3	0	1	X	4

Sheet B	Final
British Columbia (Craig) 🔨	W
Yukon (Miller)	L

Sheet C	1	2	3	4	5	6	7	8	Final
Nova Scotia (Flemming) 🔨	4	1	1	0	0	0	3	X	9
Newfoundland and Labrador (Butler)	0	0	0	1	1	0	0	X	2

Sheet D	1	2	3	4	5	6	7	8	Final
Alberta (Muise) 🔨	0	0	0	2	0	1	0	X	3
Quebec (Asselin)	1	2	4	0	1	0	2	X	10

=== Draw 4 ===
Monday, November 7, 2:00 pm

Sheet A	1	2	3	4	5	6	7	8	Final
Nova Scotia (Flemming) 🔨	1	1	0	1	0	0	0	1	4
Prince Edward Island (Watts)	0	0	0	0	2	0	0	0	2

Sheet B	1	2	3	4	5	6	7	8	Final
Northwest Territories (Koe)	1	0	1	1	1	0	1	X	5
Newfoundland and Labrador (Butler) 🔨	0	1	0	0	0	1	0	X	2

Sheet C	1	2	3	4	5	6	7	8	Final
Quebec (Asselin) 🔨	2	1	0	3	1	0	1	X	8
Saskatchewan (Meachem)	0	0	1	0	0	1	0	X	2

Sheet D	1	2	3	4	5	6	7	8	Final
British Columbia (Craig) 🔨	0	0	0	2	0	1	1	X	4
Nunavut (Mackey)	3	1	1	0	1	0	0	X	6

=== Draw 5 ===
Monday, November 7, 6:00 pm

Sheet A	1	2	3	4	5	6	7	8	Final
Manitoba (Chambers) 🔨	0	0	0	1	1	0	1	X	3
Northwest Territories (Koe)	0	4	1	0	0	1	0	X	6

Sheet B	1	2	3	4	5	6	7	8	Final
New Brunswick (Odishaw) 🔨	1	0	1	1	2	0	2	X	7
Alberta (Muise)	0	2	0	0	0	2	0	X	4

Sheet C	1	2	3	4	5	6	7	8	Final
Ontario (McDonald) 🔨	0	1	0	2	0	2	0	X	5
Northern Ontario (Bonot)	1	0	1	0	1	0	4	X	7

Sheet D	1	2	3	4	5	6	7	8	Final
Saskatchewan (Meachem)	0	2	2	1	1	0	1	X	7
Yukon (Miller) 🔨	1	0	0	0	0	1	0	X	2

=== Draw 6 ===
Tuesday, November 8, 10:00 am

Sheet A	1	2	3	4	5	6	7	8	Final
Newfoundland and Labrador (Butler) 🔨	0	1	0	0	0	0	1	X	2
Northern Ontario (Bonot)	1	0	2	1	1	2	0	X	7

Sheet B	1	2	3	4	5	6	7	8	Final
Ontario (McDonald) 🔨	0	0	1	1	1	0	3	X	6
Nova Scotia (Flemming)	1	0	0	0	0	1	0	X	2

Sheet C	1	2	3	4	5	6	7	8	Final
New Brunswick (Odishaw)	0	0	0	0	2	0	0	X	2
British Columbia (Craig) 🔨	2	3	1	1	0	1	1	X	9

Sheet D	1	2	3	4	5	6	7	8	Final
Yukon (Miller) 🔨	1	0	1	0	3	0	0	X	5
Alberta (Muise)	0	2	0	2	0	2	4	X	10

=== Draw 7 ===
Tuesday, November 8, 2:00 pm

Sheet A	1	2	3	4	5	6	7	8	Final
British Columbia (Craig)	0	0	1	0	2	0	0	X	3
Quebec (Asselin) 🔨	2	2	0	2	0	1	3	X	10

Sheet B	1	2	3	4	5	6	7	8	Final
Nunavut (Mackey)	0	1	0	0	0	0	X	X	1
Saskatchewan (Meachem) 🔨	4	0	3	3	1	1	X	X	12

Sheet C	1	2	3	4	5	6	7	8	Final
Prince Edward Island (Watts)	0	0	0	0	2	2	0	1	5
Northwest Territories (Koe) 🔨	2	1	1	1	0	0	1	0	6

Sheet D	1	2	3	4	5	6	7	8	Final
Nova Scotia (Flemming) 🔨	2	0	3	0	0	0	1	1	7
Manitoba (Chambers)	0	0	0	1	4	1	0	0	6

=== Draw 8 ===
Tuesday, November 8, 6:00 pm

Sheet A	1	2	3	4	5	6	7	8	Final
Yukon (Miller)	0	0	1	0	0	2	0	X	3
New Brunswick (Odishaw) 🔨	4	1	0	1	1	0	1	X	8

Sheet B	1	2	3	4	5	6	7	8	Final
Prince Edward Island (Watts) 🔨	2	0	0	0	0	1	0	X	3
Northern Ontario (Bonot)	0	3	2	1	2	0	2	X	10

Sheet C	1	2	3	4	5	6	7	8	Final
Nunavut (Mackey) 🔨	0	0	1	0	1	0	0	X	2
Alberta (Muise)	1	0	0	3	0	2	2	X	8

Sheet D	1	2	3	4	5	6	7	8	Final
Newfoundland and Labrador (Butler) 🔨	0	2	0	0	0	0	0	X	2
Ontario (McDonald)	0	0	2	1	0	1	1	X	5

=== Draw 9 ===
Wednesday, November 9, 10:00 am

Sheet A	1	2	3	4	5	6	7	8	Final
Northwest Territories (Koe) 🔨	1	0	1	0	0	1	0	X	3
Ontario (McDonald)	0	2	0	3	1	0	1	X	7

Sheet B	1	2	3	4	5	6	7	8	Final
Yukon (Miller) 🔨	2	0	1	1	3	1	X	X	8
Quebec (Asselin)	0	0	0	0	0	0	X	X	0

Sheet C	1	2	3	4	5	6	7	8	Final
Newfoundland and Labrador (Butler)	0	0	2	1	0	3	0	0	6
Manitoba (Chambers) 🔨	2	1	0	0	2	0	1	1	7

Sheet D	1	2	3	4	5	6	7	8	9	Final
Saskatchewan (Meachem)	0	2	0	1	0	1	0	2	0	6
New Brunswick (Odishaw) 🔨	1	0	3	0	1	0	1	0	1	7

=== Draw 10 ===
Wednesday, November 9, 2:00 pm

Sheet A	1	2	3	4	5	6	7	8	Final
Prince Edward Island (Watts)	0	1	1	0	1	0	0	0	3
Newfoundland and Labrador (Butler) 🔨	1	0	0	0	0	1	1	2	5

Sheet B	1	2	3	4	5	6	7	8	Final
Alberta (Muise) 🔨	0	0	0	1	2	0	1	0	4
British Columbia (Craig)	0	0	1	0	0	1	0	3	5

Sheet C	1	2	3	4	5	6	7	8	Final
Northern Ontario (Bonot)	0	0	2	0	2	0	1	0	5
Northwest Territories (Koe) 🔨	0	2	0	1	0	3	0	1	7

Sheet D	1	2	3	4	5	6	7	8	Final
Nunavut (Mackey)	0	2	0	2	0	0	1	1	6
Yukon (Miller) 🔨	2	0	1	0	3	1	0	0	7

=== Draw 11 ===
Wednesday, November 9, 6:00 pm

Sheet A	1	2	3	4	5	6	7	8	Final
Saskatchewan (Meachem) 🔨	2	0	0	0	4	0	1	0	7
British Columbia (Craig)	0	1	0	3	0	2	0	2	8

Sheet B	1	2	3	4	5	6	7	8	Final
Manitoba (Chambers)	0	2	0	1	0	0	1	0	4
Ontario (McDonald) 🔨	1	0	1	0	2	1	0	1	6

Sheet C	1	2	3	4	5	6	7	8	Final
Quebec (Asselin) 🔨	2	0	2	0	0	2	1	X	7
New Brunswick (Odishaw)	0	1	0	1	2	0	0	X	4

Sheet D	1	2	3	4	5	6	7	8	Final
Northwest Territories (Koe) 🔨	3	0	2	0	1	0	0	1	7
Nova Scotia (Flemming)	0	1	0	1	0	1	1	0	4

== Seeding pool ==
=== Standings ===
Final Seeding Pool Standings

Team	Skip	W	L	W–L
Manitoba	Corey Chambers	4	5	1–1
Prince Edward Island	Dennis Watts	4	5	1–1
Alberta	Morgan Muise	4	5	1–1
Newfoundland and Labrador	William Butler	3	6	–
Yukon	Terry Miller	2	7	–
Nunavut	Peter Mackey	1	8	–

=== Results ===
==== Draw 12 ====
Thursday, November 10, 9:00 am

Sheet A	1	2	3	4	5	6	7	8	Final
Nunavut (Mackey)	0	0	0	0	0	1	X	X	1
Manitoba (Chambers) 🔨	2	0	3	2	4	0	X	X	11

Sheet B	1	2	3	4	5	6	7	8	Final
Yukon (Miller)	0	0	0	0	1	0	1	X	2
Newfoundland and Labrador (Butler) 🔨	0	2	2	2	0	1	0	X	7

Sheet C	1	2	3	4	5	6	7	8	9	Final
Alberta (Muise)	0	3	0	2	1	0	0	1	0	7
Prince Edward Island (Watts) 🔨	3	0	2	0	0	1	1	0	1	8

==== Draw 14 ====
Thursday, November 10, 4:00 pm

Sheet A	1	2	3	4	5	6	7	8	Final
Alberta (Muise)	0	0	1	1	2	1	0	X	5
Manitoba (Chambers) 🔨	0	1	0	0	0	0	2	X	3

Sheet C	1	2	3	4	5	6	7	8	Final
Newfoundland and Labrador (Butler) 🔨	0	0	2	0	2	1	2	X	7
Nunavut (Mackey)	1	1	0	1	0	0	0	X	3

Sheet D	1	2	3	4	5	6	7	8	Final
Prince Edward Island (Watts) 🔨	5	0	0	2	0	0	2	X	9
Yukon (Miller)	0	1	1	0	3	1	0	X	6

==== Draw 17 ====
Friday, November 11, 4:00 pm

Sheet A	1	2	3	4	5	6	7	8	Final
Newfoundland and Labrador (Butler) 🔨	1	0	2	1	0	2	0	0	6
Alberta (Muise)	0	2	0	0	3	0	2	2	9

Sheet B	1	2	3	4	5	6	7	8	Final
Nunavut (Mackey) 🔨	0	0	1	2	0	1	0	0	4
Prince Edward Island (Watts)	0	1	0	0	1	0	1	2	5

Sheet C	1	2	3	4	5	6	7	8	Final
Manitoba (Chambers)	0	4	0	2	0	4	X	X	10
Yukon (Miller) 🔨	1	0	1	0	1	0	X	X	3

== Championship pool ==
=== Standings ===
Final Championship Pool Standings

Key
Teams to Playoffs

Team	Skip	W	L	W–L
Quebec	Félix Asselin	8	2	–
Northwest Territories	Jamie Koe	7	3	–
Northern Ontario	Trevor Bonot	6	4	2–1; 1–0
British Columbia	Miles Craig	6	4	2–1; 0–1
Ontario	Scott McDonald	6	4	1–2; 1–0
Saskatchewan	Shaun Meachem	6	4	1–2; 0–1
New Brunswick	Grant Odishaw	5	5	1–0
Nova Scotia	Paul Flemming	5	5	0–1

=== Results ===
==== Draw 13 ====
Thursday, November 10, 12:30 pm

Sheet A	1	2	3	4	5	6	7	8	Final
Northern Ontario (Bonot)	0	0	0	0	1	0	1	X	2
Quebec (Asselin) 🔨	1	1	1	1	0	2	0	X	6

Sheet B	1	2	3	4	5	6	7	8	Final
British Columbia (Craig) 🔨	0	2	0	1	0	2	1	X	6
Nova Scotia (Flemming)	0	0	2	0	1	0	0	X	3

Sheet C	1	2	3	4	5	6	7	8	Final
Northwest Territories (Koe)	0	0	0	0	1	0	2	1	4
Saskatchewan (Meachem) 🔨	0	0	3	0	0	2	0	0	5

Sheet D	1	2	3	4	5	6	7	8	Final
New Brunswick (Odishaw)	0	1	0	3	0	1	0	X	5
Ontario (McDonald) 🔨	2	0	2	0	1	0	2	X	7

==== Draw 15 ====
Thursday, November 10, 7:30 pm

Sheet A	1	2	3	4	5	6	7	8	Final
Saskatchewan (Meachem)	0	2	0	1	0	2	0	X	5
Ontario (McDonald) 🔨	2	0	3	0	3	0	1	X	9

Sheet B	1	2	3	4	5	6	7	8	Final
Northwest Territories (Koe) 🔨	0	2	0	3	0	4	1	X	10
New Brunswick (Odishaw)	0	0	2	0	2	0	0	X	4

Sheet C	1	2	3	4	5	6	7	8	Final
Quebec (Asselin) 🔨	0	1	0	1	0	0	2	0	4
Nova Scotia (Flemming)	0	0	1	0	0	2	0	2	5

Sheet D	1	2	3	4	5	6	7	8	Final
Northern Ontario (Bonot)	0	0	1	0	2	0	3	X	6
British Columbia (Craig) 🔨	0	0	0	1	0	1	0	X	2

==== Draw 16 ====
Friday, November 11, 12:30 pm

Sheet A	1	2	3	4	5	6	7	8	Final
British Columbia (Craig)	0	1	0	0	1	0	0	1	3
Northwest Territories (Koe) 🔨	1	0	0	1	0	2	1	0	5

Sheet B	1	2	3	4	5	6	7	8	Final
Ontario (McDonald)	0	0	2	0	0	1	1	0	4
Quebec (Asselin) 🔨	0	2	0	1	0	0	0	2	5

Sheet C	1	2	3	4	5	6	7	8	Final
New Brunswick (Odishaw)	0	0	0	1	0	1	0	X	2
Northern Ontario (Bonot) 🔨	1	1	1	0	1	0	1	X	5

Sheet D	1	2	3	4	5	6	7	8	Final
Nova Scotia (Flemming)	0	1	0	3	0	1	0	X	5
Saskatchewan (Meachem) 🔨	2	0	3	0	4	0	1	X	10

==== Draw 18 ====
Friday, November 11, 7:30 pm

Sheet A	1	2	3	4	5	6	7	8	Final
Nova Scotia (Flemming)	0	2	0	0	0	3	0	1	6
New Brunswick (Odishaw) 🔨	2	0	2	1	1	0	1	0	7

Sheet B	1	2	3	4	5	6	7	8	Final
Saskatchewan (Meachem)	1	0	2	0	4	1	0	X	8
Northern Ontario (Bonot) 🔨	0	2	0	1	0	0	2	X	5

Sheet C	1	2	3	4	5	6	7	8	Final
Ontario (McDonald)	0	0	2	0	0	1	0	X	3
British Columbia (Craig) 🔨	1	0	0	3	1	0	1	X	6

Sheet D	1	2	3	4	5	6	7	8	9	Final
Quebec (Asselin)	0	0	0	0	1	1	0	1	1	4
Northwest Territories (Koe) 🔨	0	0	0	1	0	0	2	0	0	3

== Playoffs ==
Semifinals
1	Quebec	5
4	British Columbia	3
2	Northwest Territories	5
3	Northern Ontario	6

Final
1	Quebec	10
3	Northern Ontario	3
Third place
4	British Columbia	3
2	Northwest Territories	10

=== Semifinals ===
Saturday, November 12, 10:00 am

Sheet A	1	2	3	4	5	6	7	8	Final
Quebec (Asselin) 🔨	0	0	0	2	0	2	0	1	5
British Columbia (Craig)	0	0	1	0	1	0	1	0	3

Sheet C	1	2	3	4	5	6	7	8	Final
Northwest Territories (Koe) 🔨	1	0	0	2	0	0	1	0	5
Northern Ontario (Bonot)	0	0	1	0	3	1	0	1	6

=== Bronze medal game ===
Saturday, November 12, 2:30 pm

Sheet C	1	2	3	4	5	6	7	8	Final
British Columbia (Craig)	0	1	0	2	0	0	X	X	3
Northwest Territories (Koe) 🔨	2	0	4	0	4	0	X	X	10

=== Final ===
Saturday, November 12, 2:30 pm

Sheet A	1	2	3	4	5	6	7	8	Final
Quebec (Asselin) 🔨	3	2	4	0	0	1	X	X	10
Northern Ontario (Bonot)	0	0	0	2	1	0	X	X	3
