= 2023 Northern Ontario Men's Provincial Curling Championship =

Curling championship held in Kenora, Ontario

- Host city: Kenora, Ontario
- Arena: Kenora Recreation Centre
- Dates: January 25–29
- Winner: Team Horgan
- Curling club: Northern Credit Union CC, Sudbury
- Skip: Tanner Horgan
- Third: Darren Moulding
- Second: Jake Horgan
- Lead: Colin Hodgson
- Finalist: Sandy MacEwan

The 2023 Northern Ontario Men's Provincial Curling Championship, also known as the Unibet Northern Ontario Tankard, the men's provincial curling championship for Northern Ontario, was held from January 25 to 29 at the Kenora Recreation Centre in Kenora, Ontario. The winning Tanner Horgan rink represented Northern Ontario at the 2023 Tim Hortons Brier, Canada's national men's curling championship, at the Budweiser Gardens in London, Ontario. The event was held in conjunction with the 2023 Northern Ontario Scotties Tournament of Hearts, the provincial women's curling championship.

== Teams ==
The teams are listed as follows:

Skip	Third	Second	Lead	Alternate	Club
Brian Adams Jr.	Mark Koivula	Colin Koivula	Joel Adams		Port Arthur CC, Thunder Bay
Trevor Bonot	Mike McCarville	Jordan Potts	Kurtis Byrd	Al Hackner	Fort William CC, Thunder Bay
Dallas Burgess	Jackson Dubinksky	Matt Duizer	Owen Riches		Port Arthur CC, Thunder Bay
Kory Carr	Tyler Stewart	Travis Potter	Jamie Childs		Port Arthur CC, Thunder Bay
Chris Glibota	Dan Mick	Eric Gelinas	Marc Barrette	Matt Mann	Community First CC, Sault Ste. Marie
Tanner Horgan	Darren Moulding	Jacob Horgan	Colin Hodgson		Northern Credit Union Curling Club, Sudbury
Brad Jacobs	Jordan Chandler	Kyle Chandler	Jamie Broad		Community First CC, Sault Ste. Marie; Little Current CC, Little Current
Sandy MacEwan	Dustin Montpellier	Lee Toner	Luc Ouimet		Curl Sudbury, Sudbury
Ryan Meadows	Jon Ranger	Cameron Longe	Taylor Schottroff	Kevin Brown	Kenora CC, Kenora
Josh Szajewski	Chris Lock	Wade Shasky	Matt Schottroff	Michael Szajewski	Keewatin CC, Keewatin

== Knockout brackets ==
=== A event ===
First Knockout	Qualifier 1
Tanner Horgan	9
Dallas Burgess	4	Josh Szajewski	0
Josh Szajewski	7	Tanner Horgan	5
Trevor Bonot	7
Trevor Bonot	8
Brian Adams Jr.	1
Trevor Bonot	7
Brad Jacobs	1
Kory Carr	4
Chris Glibota	10	Sandy MacEwan	5
Ryan Meadows	3	Sandy MacEwan	6
Brad Jacobs	10
Chris Glibota	1
Brad Jacobs	8

=== B event ===
Second Knockout	Qualifier 2
Brad Jacobs	5
Dallas Burgess	6	Sandy MacEwan	8
Kory Carr	11	Kory Carr	1
Chris Glibota	7
Chris Glibota	6
Tanner Horgan	5
Chris Glibota	3
Ryan Meadows	4	Sandy MacEwan	8
Brian Adams Jr.	6	Brian Adams Jr.	8
Josh Szajewski	4
Brian Adams Jr.	4
Sandy MacEwan	9

=== C Event ===
Third Knockout	Qualifier 3
Brad Jacobs	4
Tanner Horgan	8	Tanner Horgan	6
Dallas Burgess	7	Dallas Burgess	1
Josh Szajewski	6

Third Knockout	Qualifier 4
Chris Glibota	6
Brian Adams Jr.	6	Kory Carr	8
Ryan Meadows	7	Kory Carr	8
Kory Carr	9

== Knockout Results ==
All draws are listed in Central Time (UTC−06:00).

=== Draw 1 ===
Wednesday, January 25, 9:30 am

Sheet B	1	2	3	4	5	6	7	8	9	10	Final
Dallas Burgess	1	0	0	2	1	0	0	0	0	0	4
Josh Szajewski 🔨	0	0	3	0	0	0	1	1	0	2	7

Sheet E	1	2	3	4	5	6	7	8	9	10	Final
Chris Glibota	0	1	0	1	0	3	0	4	1	X	10
Ryan Meadows 🔨	0	0	0	0	1	0	2	0	0	X	3

=== Draw 2 ===
Wednesday, January 25, 2:30 pm

Sheet C	1	2	3	4	5	6	7	8	9	10	Final
Trevor Bonot 🔨	0	2	1	0	1	4	X	X	X	X	8
Brian Adams Jr.	0	0	0	1	0	0	X	X	X	X	1

Sheet D	1	2	3	4	5	6	7	8	9	10	Final
Kory Carr	0	0	0	0	0	3	0	1	0	0	4
Sandy MacEwan 🔨	0	2	0	0	0	0	2	0	0	1	5

=== Draw 3 ===
Wednesday, January 25, 7:30 pm

Sheet A	1	2	3	4	5	6	7	8	9	10	Final
Tanner Horgan 🔨	0	2	0	0	0	2	1	4	X	X	9
Josh Szajewski	0	0	0	0	0	0	0	0	X	X	0

Sheet D	1	2	3	4	5	6	7	8	9	10	Final
Chris Glibota	0	0	0	0	1	X	X	X	X	X	1
Brad Jacobs 🔨	2	2	1	3	0	X	X	X	X	X	8

=== Draw 4 ===
Thursday, January 26, 9:30 am

Sheet B	1	2	3	4	5	6	7	8	9	10	Final
Ryan Meadows 🔨	1	0	0	1	0	1	0	0	1	0	4
Brian Adams Jr.	0	1	1	0	0	0	1	2	0	1	6

Sheet C	1	2	3	4	5	6	7	8	9	10	Final
Dallas Burgess	0	2	0	1	1	1	0	1	0	X	6
Kory Carr 🔨	2	0	3	0	0	0	2	0	4	X	11

=== Draw 5 ===
Thursday, January 26, 2:30 pm

Sheet C	1	2	3	4	5	6	7	8	9	10	11	Final
Sandy MacEwan 🔨	1	0	0	2	0	1	1	0	0	1	0	6
Brad Jacobs	0	1	1	0	1	0	0	2	1	0	4	10

Sheet D	1	2	3	4	5	6	7	8	9	10	Final
Tanner Horgan	0	0	1	1	2	1	0	0	0	0	5
Trevor Bonot 🔨	1	0	0	0	0	0	1	3	0	2	7

=== Draw 6 ===
Thursday, January 26, 7:30 pm

Sheet A	1	2	3	4	5	6	7	8	9	10	Final
Kory Carr 🔨	0	0	0	0	0	0	1	0	0	X	1
Chris Glibota	0	0	0	1	1	0	0	2	3	X	7

Sheet C	1	2	3	4	5	6	7	8	9	10	Final
Brian Adams Jr. 🔨	0	3	0	2	0	0	2	0	1	X	8
Josh Szajewski	0	0	2	0	1	0	0	1	0	X	4

=== Draw 7 ===
Friday, January 27, 9:30 am

Sheet A	1	2	3	4	5	6	7	8	9	10	Final
Dallas Burgess	0	0	2	0	2	0	0	2	0	1	7
Josh Szajewski 🔨	2	0	0	4	0	0	0	0	0	0	6

Sheet B	1	2	3	4	5	6	7	8	9	10	Final
Chris Glibota 🔨	0	1	0	2	0	1	0	1	0	1	6
Tanner Horgan	1	0	0	0	1	0	2	0	1	0	5

Sheet C	1	2	3	4	5	6	7	8	9	10	Final
Ryan Meadows	0	0	0	0	1	0	2	0	1	3	7
Kory Carr 🔨	3	2	1	0	0	2	0	1	0	0	9

Sheet D	1	2	3	4	5	6	7	8	9	10	Final
Brian Adams Jr.	0	0	3	1	0	0	0	0	0	0	4
Sandy MacEwan 🔨	0	1	0	0	1	1	0	2	1	3	9

=== Draw 8 ===
Friday, January 27, 2:30 pm

Sheet A	1	2	3	4	5	6	7	8	9	10	Final
Trevor Bonot 🔨	1	0	0	0	2	1	2	1	X	X	7
Brad Jacobs	0	1	0	0	0	0	0	0	X	X	1

Sheet E	1	2	3	4	5	6	7	8	9	10	Final
Chris Glibota 🔨	0	2	0	1	0	0	0	X	X	X	3
Sandy MacEwan	1	0	3	0	1	1	2	X	X	X	8

=== Draw 9 ===
Friday, January 27, 7:30 pm

Sheet B	1	2	3	4	5	6	7	8	9	10	11	Final
Brian Adams Jr.	0	0	0	1	0	0	2	0	3	0	0	6
Kory Carr 🔨	0	1	0	0	1	2	0	1	0	1	2	8

Sheet E	1	2	3	4	5	6	7	8	9	10	Final
Tanner Horgan 🔨	3	0	1	0	1	2	1	X	X	X	8
Dallas Burgess	0	1	0	0	0	0	0	X	X	X	1

=== Draw 10 ===
Saturday, January 28, 9:30 am

Sheet B	1	2	3	4	5	6	7	8	9	10	Final
Brad Jacobs 🔨	0	0	1	0	2	0	1	1	0	X	5
Sandy MacEwan	0	1	0	1	0	2	0	0	4	X	8

=== Draw 11 ===
Saturday, January 28, 2:30 pm

Sheet A	1	2	3	4	5	6	7	8	9	10	Final
Chris Glibota	0	1	0	0	2	0	0	1	2	0	6
Kory Carr 🔨	4	0	1	1	0	1	0	0	0	1	8

Sheet C	1	2	3	4	5	6	7	8	9	10	Final
Brad Jacobs 🔨	1	0	2	0	0	0	1	0	0	0	4
Tanner Horgan	0	2	0	2	0	1	0	0	0	1	6

== Playoffs ==
Page playoff system
A	Trevor Bonot	6
B	Sandy MacEwan	9
C1	Kory Carr	3
C2	Tanner Horgan	9

Semifinal
A	Trevor Bonot	5
C2	Tanner Horgan	7

Final
B	Sandy MacEwan	5
C2	Tanner Horgan	7

=== A vs. B ===
Saturday, January 28, 7:30 pm

Sheet D	1	2	3	4	5	6	7	8	9	10	Final
Trevor Bonot 🔨	0	0	1	0	0	3	0	0	2	0	6
Sandy MacEwan	1	0	0	1	4	0	1	1	0	1	9

=== C1 vs. C2 ===
Saturday, January 28, 7:30 pm

Sheet E	1	2	3	4	5	6	7	8	9	10	Final
Kory Carr	0	0	1	0	1	0	1	0	X	X	3
Tanner Horgan	2	2	0	2	0	0	0	3	X	X	9

=== Semifinal ===
Sunday, January 29, 9:30 am

Sheet B	1	2	3	4	5	6	7	8	9	10	Final
Trevor Bonot 🔨	1	0	0	1	0	2	0	1	0	X	5
Tanner Horgan	0	2	0	0	1	0	2	0	2	X	7

=== Final ===
Sunday, January 29, 6:00 pm

Sheet C	1	2	3	4	5	6	7	8	9	10	Final
Sandy MacEwan 🔨	1	2	0	1	0	0	0	1	0	0	5
Tanner Horgan	0	0	2	0	2	2	0	0	0	1	7

2023 Northern Ontario Men's Provincial Curling Championship

Tanner Horgan
1st Northern Ontario Provincial Championship title
