= 2024 Northern Ontario Men's Provincial Curling Championship =

Curling championship held in Little Current, Ontario

- Host city: Little Current, Ontario
- Arena: NEMI Recreation Complex
- Dates: January 24–28
- Winner: Team Bonot
- Curling club: Fort William CC, Thunder Bay
- Skip: Trevor Bonot
- Third: Mike McCarville
- Second: Jordan Potts
- Lead: Kurtis Byrd
- Coach: Al Hackner
- Finalist: Tanner Horgan

The 2024 Northern Ontario Men's Provincial Curling Championship, the men's provincial curling championship for Northern Ontario, was held from January 24 to 28 at the NEMI Recreation Complex in Little Current, Ontario. The winning Trevor Bonot represented Northern Ontario at the 2024 Montana's Brier, Canada's national men's curling championship in Regina, Saskatchewan. The event was held in conjunction with the 2024 Northern Ontario Scotties Tournament of Hearts, the provincial women's curling championship.

== Teams ==
The teams are listed as follows:

Skip	Third	Second	Lead	Alternate	Coach	Club
Brian Adams Jr.	Colin Koivula	Mark Koivula	Joel Adams			Port Arthur CC, Thunder Bay
Mike Assad	Jason Strelezki	Chris Gordon	Matthew Gordon			Copper Cliff CC, Copper Cliff
Trevor Bonot	Mike McCarville	Jordan Potts	Kurtis Byrd		Al Hackner	Fort William CC, Thunder Bay
Bryan Burgess	Mike Vale	Tristan Vale	Scott Shumka			Port Arthur CC, Thunder Bay
Jordan Chandler	Connor Lawes	Charlie Robert	Kyle Chandler			Little Current CC, Little Current
Ian Deschene	Olivier Bonin-Ducharme	Brayden Sinclair	Connor Simms		Jeff Masters	Northern Credit Union CC, Sudbury
Tanner Horgan	Jacob Horgan	Ian McMillan	Scott Chadwick		Sean Turriff	Northern Credit Union CC, Sudbury
Matthew Hunt	Jake Reid	Matt Mann	Kyle Sherlock	Scott McDermott		YNCU Curling Centre, Sault Ste. Marie
Sandy MacEwan	Dustin Montpellier	Lee Toner	Luc Ouimet			Northern Credit Union CC, Sudbury
Brad Minogue	Ryan Sayer	Graehem Sayer	Ryan Forget			North Bay GC, North Bay
Malcolm O'Bright	Kyle Vainio	Dylan Burns	Sean Breadmore		Cheryl Vainio	Kenora CC, Kenora
Brendan Rajala	Jackson Dubinsky	Jesse Crozier	Adam Wiersema	Brian Rajala		Northern Credit Union CC, Sudbury
Chris Silver	Owen Riches	Connor Mangoff	Travis Showalter			Fort William CC, Thunder Bay
Zack Warkentin	Tyler Stewart	Travis Potter	Jamie Childs		Tim Warkentin	Port Arthur CC, Thunder Bay

=== Map of teams ===
Northern Ontario Men's Curling Championship Teams

== Knockout brackets ==
=== A event ===
First Knockout	Qualifier 1
Tanner Horgan	8
Brad Minogue	4
Chris Silver	4
Brad Minogue	14
Tanner Horgan	6
Brian Adams Jr.	2
Brian Adams Jr.	7
Brendan Rajala	4
Brian Adams Jr.	8
Jordan Chandler	1
Jordan Chandler	8
Ian Deschene	3
Tanner Horgan	10
Trevor Bonot	4
Trevor Bonot	10
Malcolm O'Bright	3
Trevor Bonot	11
Matthew Hunt	3
Matthew Hunt	9
Zack Warkentin	7
Trevor Bonot	8
Mike Assad	3
Bryan Burgess	4
Mike Assad	6
Mike Assad	6
Sandy MacEwan	5

=== B event ===
Second Knockout	Qualifier 2
Chris Silver	4
Sandy MacEwan	9
Sandy MacEwan	5
Jordan Chandler	6	Jordan Chandler	6
Jordan Chandler	7
Mike Assad	5
Malcolm O'Bright	5	Zack Warkentin	5
Zack Warkentin	10
Trevor Bonot	8
Jordan Chandler	6	Brian Adams Jr.	5
Brian Adams Jr.	7
Matthew Hunt	7
Brendan Rajala	3	Ian Deschene	10
Ian Deschene	7
Ian Deschene	7
Brad Minogue	5	Ian Deschene	6
Brad Minogue	9
Brian Adams Jr.	7
Bryan Burgess	5

=== C Event ===
Third Knockout	C Qualifier
Jordan Chandler	8	Brian Adams Jr.	5
Sandy MacEwan	2	Brad Minogue	7	Zack Warkentin	10
Brad Minogue	9	Brad Minogue	8	Jordan Chandler	7
Bryan Burgess	7	Malcolm O'Bright	6	Zack Warkentin	10
Malcolm O'Bright	11	Malcolm O'Bright	8	Mike Assad	3
Brendan Rajala	6	Ian Deschene	4	Zack Warkentin	8
Chris Silver	4	Zack Warkentin	10
Zack Warkentin	7	Zack Warkentin	6
Matthew Hunt	1

== Knockout Results ==
All draws are listed in Eastern Time (UTC−05:00).

=== Draw 1 ===
Wednesday, January 24, 9:00 am

Sheet A	1	2	3	4	5	6	7	8	9	10	Final
Chris Silver	0	0	0	1	0	2	0	1	0	X	4
Brad Minogue 🔨	1	1	4	0	2	0	1	0	5	X	14

Sheet B	1	2	3	4	5	6	7	8	9	10	Final
Jordan Chandler	1	1	0	1	0	2	1	2	X	X	8
Ian Deschene 🔨	0	0	1	0	2	0	0	0	X	X	3

Sheet C	1	2	3	4	5	6	7	8	9	10	Final
Trevor Bonot 🔨	1	0	1	2	0	2	0	4	X	X	10
Malcolm O'Bright	0	1	0	0	1	0	1	0	X	X	3

Sheet D	1	2	3	4	5	6	7	8	9	10	Final
Matthew Hunt 🔨	0	0	2	0	0	0	2	2	2	1	9
Zack Warkentin	3	1	0	0	0	3	0	0	0	0	7

Sheet E	1	2	3	4	5	6	7	8	9	10	Final
Bryan Burgess 🔨	0	0	0	1	3	0	0	0	0	0	4
Mike Assad	0	0	0	0	0	3	0	1	1	1	6

=== Draw 2 ===
Wednesday, January 24, 2:00 pm

Sheet A	1	2	3	4	5	6	7	8	9	10	Final
Brian Adams Jr.	1	0	2	0	0	1	0	3	0	X	7
Brendan Rajala 🔨	0	1	0	1	0	0	1	0	1	X	4

Sheet B	1	2	3	4	5	6	7	8	9	10	Final
Tanner Horgan 🔨	1	1	1	0	0	2	0	0	0	3	8
Brad Minogue	0	0	0	1	0	0	1	1	1	0	4

Sheet D	1	2	3	4	5	6	7	8	9	10	Final
Mike Assad 🔨	1	0	2	0	0	1	0	0	1	1	6
Sandy MacEwan	0	1	0	2	1	0	0	1	0	0	5

Sheet E	1	2	3	4	5	6	7	8	9	10	Final
Trevor Bonot 🔨	2	0	2	0	1	1	1	4	X	X	11
Matthew Hunt	0	1	0	2	0	0	0	0	X	X	3

=== Draw 3 ===
Wednesday, January 24, 7:00 pm

Sheet B	1	2	3	4	5	6	7	8	9	10	Final
Malcolm O'Bright	1	0	1	0	1	0	2	0	0	X	5
Zack Warkentin 🔨	0	2	0	2	0	2	0	1	3	X	10

Sheet C	1	2	3	4	5	6	7	8	9	10	Final
Brendan Rajala	0	0	0	0	2	0	0	1	0	X	3
Ian Deschene 🔨	1	1	0	1	0	1	1	0	2	X	7

Sheet D	1	2	3	4	5	6	7	8	9	10	Final
Brian Adams Jr. 🔨	1	2	0	1	4	X	X	X	X	X	8
Jordan Chandler	0	0	1	0	0	X	X	X	X	X	1

=== Draw 4 ===
Thursday, January 25, 9:00 am

Sheet A	1	2	3	4	5	6	7	8	9	10	Final
Brad Minogue 🔨	0	2	0	0	0	0	1	1	5	X	9
Bryan Burgess	1	0	0	2	1	1	0	0	0	X	5

Sheet B	1	2	3	4	5	6	7	8	9	10	Final
Ian Deschene	0	2	1	0	3	1	0	2	1	X	10
Matthew Hunt 🔨	1	0	0	2	0	0	4	0	0	X	7

Sheet C	1	2	3	4	5	6	7	8	9	10	Final
Chris Silver	0	0	1	0	1	0	1	1	0	X	4
Sandy MacEwan 🔨	1	0	0	2	0	2	0	0	4	X	9

Sheet D	1	2	3	4	5	6	7	8	9	10	Final
Zack Warkentin	0	2	0	1	0	0	0	0	2	0	5
Jordan Chandler 🔨	2	0	1	0	0	0	1	1	0	2	7

Sheet E	1	2	3	4	5	6	7	8	9	10	Final
Malcolm O'Bright	0	3	0	2	0	3	0	1	2	X	11
Brendan Rajala 🔨	1	0	2	0	1	0	2	0	0	X	6

=== Draw 5 ===
Thursday, January 25, 3:30 pm

Sheet A	1	2	3	4	5	6	7	8	9	10	Final
Sandy MacEwan	0	0	0	0	0	2	1	0	2	0	5
Jordan Chandler 🔨	0	1	0	1	0	0	0	3	0	1	6

Sheet B	1	2	3	4	5	6	7	8	9	10	Final
Bryan Burgess	0	1	0	2	0	3	0	0	1	0	7
Malcolm O'Bright 🔨	2	0	1	0	2	0	1	1	0	1	8

Sheet C	1	2	3	4	5	6	7	8	9	10	Final
Trevor Bonot	0	0	3	0	1	0	1	0	3	X	8
Mike Assad 🔨	1	0	0	2	0	0	0	0	0	X	3

Sheet D	1	2	3	4	5	6	7	8	9	10	Final
Tanner Horgan 🔨	1	2	0	0	1	1	0	1	X	X	6
Brian Adams Jr.	0	0	0	1	0	0	1	0	X	X	2

Sheet E	1	2	3	4	5	6	7	8	9	10	Final
Ian Deschene 🔨	0	2	0	0	4	0	0	0	0	1	7
Brad Minogue	0	0	2	2	0	0	1	0	0	0	5

=== Draw 6 ===
Thursday, January 25, 8:00 pm

Sheet A	1	2	3	4	5	6	7	8	9	10	Final
Zack Warkentin 🔨	3	0	0	1	0	1	2	X	X	X	7
Matthew Hunt	0	0	1	0	0	0	0	X	X	X	1

=== Draw 7 ===
Friday, January 26, 9:30 am

Sheet A	1	2	3	4	5	6	7	8	9	10	Final
Brad Minogue 🔨	3	0	0	1	1	0	2	1	0	1	9
Malcolm O'Bright	0	1	2	0	0	2	0	0	1	0	6

Sheet B	1	2	3	4	5	6	7	8	9	10	11	Final
Jordan Chandler	0	1	0	0	2	0	1	0	1	0	1	6
Mike Assad 🔨	0	0	2	0	0	1	0	1	0	1	0	5

Sheet C	1	2	3	4	5	6	7	8	9	10	Final
Ian Deschene	0	1	0	2	2	0	1	0	0	0	6
Brian Adams Jr. 🔨	0	0	1	0	0	2	0	3	0	1	7

Sheet E	1	2	3	4	5	6	7	8	9	10	Final
Chris Silver 🔨	0	0	1	0	0	2	0	0	1	0	4
Zack Warkentin	1	1	0	1	1	0	1	0	0	1	6

=== Draw 8 ===
Friday, January 26, 2:30 pm

Sheet A	1	2	3	4	5	6	7	8	9	10	Final
Ian Deschene	0	0	1	0	0	1	2	0	0	X	4
Zack Warkentin 🔨	1	1	0	0	3	0	0	3	2	X	10

Sheet D	1	2	3	4	5	6	7	8	9	10	Final
Sandy MacEwan	0	1	0	1	0	0	0	X	X	X	2
Brad Minogue 🔨	2	0	3	0	1	1	1	X	X	X	8

=== Draw 9 ===
Friday, January 26, 7:30 pm

Sheet B	1	2	3	4	5	6	7	8	9	10	Final
Tanner Horgan 🔨	2	0	0	2	0	1	0	3	2	X	10
Trevor Bonot	0	0	3	0	1	0	0	0	0	X	4

Sheet E	1	2	3	4	5	6	7	8	9	10	11	Final
Jordan Chandler	1	0	0	0	1	0	1	0	0	3	0	6
Brian Adams Jr. 🔨	0	1	0	0	0	2	0	2	1	0	1	7

=== Draw 10 ===
Saturday, January 27, 9:30 am

Sheet B	1	2	3	4	5	6	7	8	9	10	11	Final
Jordan Chandler 🔨	0	1	0	0	1	0	3	0	2	0	1	8
Brad Minogue	1	0	0	2	0	1	0	1	0	2	0	7

Sheet D	1	2	3	4	5	6	7	8	9	10	Final
Mike Assad	0	0	1	0	0	1	1	0	X	X	3
Zack Warkentin 🔨	1	1	0	0	5	0	0	1	X	X	8

=== Draw 11 ===
Saturday, January 27, 2:30 pm

Sheet A	1	2	3	4	5	6	7	8	9	10	Final
Trevor Bonot 🔨	0	2	0	0	1	0	1	0	3	1	8
Brian Adams Jr.	0	0	1	0	0	1	0	3	0	0	5

Sheet B	1	2	3	4	5	6	7	8	9	10	Final
Jordan Chandler	0	1	1	0	0	2	0	2	1	0	7
Zack Warkentin 🔨	2	0	0	1	2	0	3	0	0	2	10

=== Draw 12 ===
Saturday, January 27, 7:30 pm

Sheet D	1	2	3	4	5	6	7	8	9	10	Final
Brian Adams Jr. 🔨	0	0	0	0	3	2	0	0	X	X	5
Zack Warkentin	0	2	2	2	0	0	2	2	X	X	10

== Playoffs ==
Semifinal			Final
			A	Tanner Horgan	5
B	Trevor Bonot	9	B	Trevor Bonot	7
C	Zack Warkentin	2

=== Semifinal ===
Sunday, January 29, 9:30 am

Sheet B	1	2	3	4	5	6	7	8	9	10	Final
Trevor Bonot 🔨	1	1	2	0	4	0	1	X	X	X	9
Zack Warkentin	0	0	0	1	0	1	0	X	X	X	2

=== Final ===
Sunday, January 28, 1:30 pm

Sheet C	1	2	3	4	5	6	7	8	9	10	Final
Tanner Horgan 🔨	0	0	2	0	1	1	1	0	0	0	5
Trevor Bonot	0	3	0	1	0	0	0	2	0	1	7

2024 Northern Ontario Men's Provincial Curling Championship

Trevor Bonot
1st Northern Ontario Provincial Championship title
