= Amanda Gates =

Canadian curler

- Curler
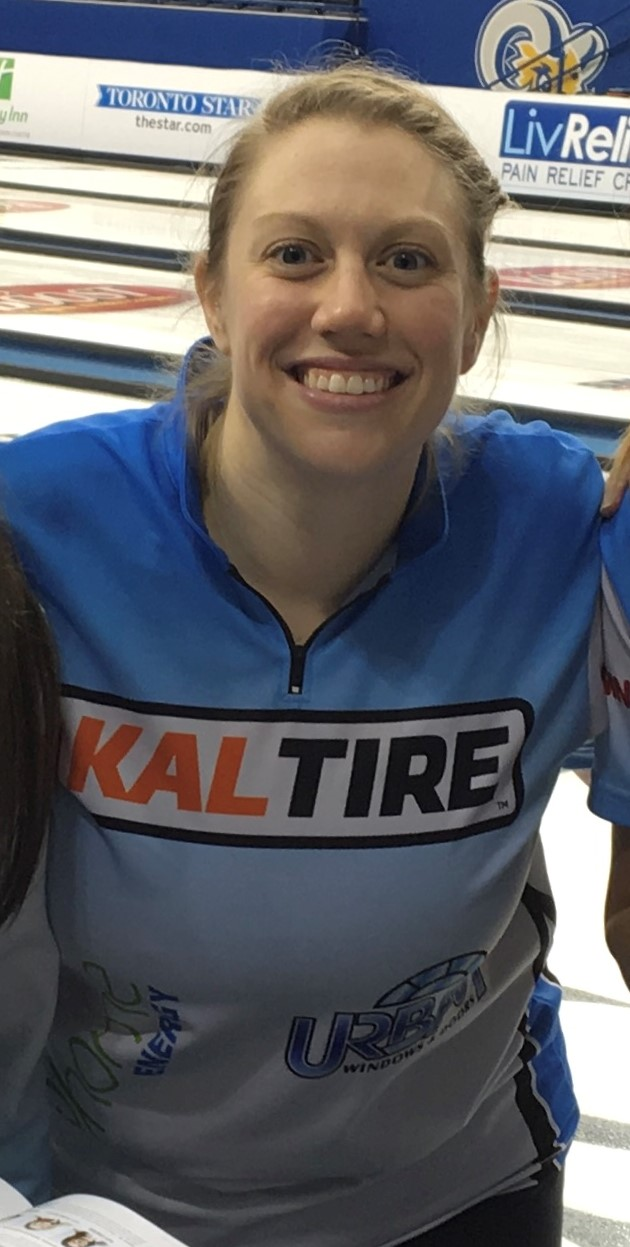
- Gates at the 2017 Players' Championship
- Born: March 26, 1986 (age 40); Sudbury, Ontario

Team
- Curling club: Idylwylde G&CC, Sudbury, ON
- Skip: Jackie McCormick
- Third: Crystal Taylor
- Second: Jen Gates
- Lead: Amanda Gates
- Mixed doubles partner: Dustin Montpellier

Curling career
- Member Association: Northern Ontario
- Hearts: 4 (2012, 2015, 2018, 2021)
- Top CTRS ranking: 7th (2015–16, 2016–17)

Amanda Gates (born March 26, 1986, in Sudbury, Ontario) is a Canadian curler. Gates used to play with Team Tracy Fleury (née Horgan) and in 2015, Team Horgan became the first women's team in the history of women's curling to represent Northern Ontario at the Scotties Tournament of Hearts. In Gates' first appearance at the Scotties (2012 in Red Deer, Alberta), she won the Marj Mitchell Sportsmanship Award.

== Career ==
=== Bantams and juniors 2002–2007 ===
Gates began her bantam curling career representing Northern Ontario at the 2002 Ontario Winter Games in Guelph, Ontario. Gates went to play lead for the Team Horgan rink, who went on to represent Northern Ontario at the 2005, 2006 and 2007 Canadian Junior Curling Championships. Their best finish was a tie for third place in 2006. Gates skipped a high school team to a city championship in 2004. Gates also joined the Laurentian University Varsity curling team in 2009 where Laurentian took a bronze medal at University Nationals in Montreal, Quebec.

=== Women's 2008 to 2018 ===
As a member of Team Horgan, continuing to play in the lead position, Gates competed in the 2008, 2009, 2010, 2011 Ontario Scotties before breaking through in 2012 and defeating Rachel Homan to represent Ontario at the 2012 Scotties Tournament of Hearts in Red Deer, Alberta. At this first appearance, they finished with a 4–7 record. At this event, Gates won the Marj Mitchell Sportsmenship award. During the 2012–13 season, although Team Horgan was unsuccessful at the Ontario Scotties, they did win the AMJ Campbell Shorty Jenkins Classic.

The Fleury rink secured a spot at the 2013 Road to the Roar, the Olympic pre-trials event. At the Road to the Roar, the team went 4–3 and lost the 'C' event final on last rock to Val Sweeting, who qualified for the Roar along with Renée Sonnenberg. Fleury defeated the top two seeds at the event, Shannon Kleibrink and Laura Crocker. Following the Pre-Trials, the team went undefeated at the Northern Ontario Scotties playdowns. By finishing first at the playdowns, the team competed at the 2014 Ontario Scotties Tournament of Hearts in Sault Ste. Marie, Ontario. The team had a disappointing run at the provincials that year, giving up key steals in their losses to finish with a 5–4 record and ultimately missing the playoffs for a second consecutive year.

The team was selected to represent Canada at the third annual Yichun International Ladies Cup in Yichun, China from December 28, 2013 – January 1, 2014. The team went 6–1 in the round-robin with their only loss coming from Silvana Tirinzoni of Switzerland in the opening draw. The team defeated Wang Bingyu in the semifinal and Jiang Yilun in the final to win the event.

The team has had a successful start to their 2014–15 season, finishing third at the Stroud Sleeman Cash Spiel and qualifying for the playoffs of a Grand Slam event, the 2014 Curlers Corner Autumn Gold Curling Classic for a second time in their career making it to the quarterfinal before losing to former provincial rival Rachel Homan of Ottawa. At the 2014 DEKALB Superspiel in Morris, Manitoba, the team lost their opening match to Colleen Kilgallen before winning their next eight games. They defeated St. Vital's Jennifer Jones in the final and earned 22.5 CTRS Points for their win. Just three weeks later, at the Curl Mesabi Classic, the Fleury rink finished first in their pool after the round-robin with a 3–1 record. In the playoffs, they defeated Patti Lank in the semifinal and defeated Erika Brown in the final to claim the championship title. At the 2015 Northern Ontario Scotties Tournament of Hearts, the Fleury rink became the first women's team to represent Northern Ontario at the Scotties. The team finished the tournament with a perfect 5–0 record, defeating city rival Kendra Lilly 4–3 in a close match. Team Fleury then had to win a relegation qualifier prior to the 2015 Scotties Tournament of Hearts in order to compete in the main tournament.

During the relegation round at the 2015 Scotties Tournament of Hearts, they defeated Kerry Galusha from the Northwest Territories 10–5 and then beat Sarah Koltun from the Yukon 7–5. In the pre-qualification final, they once again defeated the team from Yellowknife, 7–6, securing the right to represent Northern Ontario in the main draw at the Scotties for the first time. In the main event, they found some success defeating higher seeds such as Julie Hastings and Stefanie Lawton. Headed into draw seventeen, the final draw before playoffs, Northern Ontario and Rachel Homan, Team Canada at the time, shared 6–4 records. The winner of their game would determine the fourth seed for playoffs, and the loser would be eliminated. After leading 4–2 after six ends, they would allow Homan to score two points in the seventh end to tie the game. After a blank in the eighth, Fleury was heavy on a tap attempt in the ninth end and gave up a steal of two points. Homan would run them out of stones in the tenth end to win 6–5. Therefore, Northern Ontario finished fifth at the 2015 event with a 6–5 record.

After the conclusion of the 2014–15 season, Team Fleury announced that they would add Calgary's Crystal Webster to the lineup in a five-player rotation due to work commitments from Fleury's front end. The team found success early, advancing all the way to the semifinal of the 2015 Tour Challenge Grand Slam. They finished the round robin with a 2–2 record with wins over Eve Muirhead and Kim Eun-jung, qualifying for a tiebreaker. The team stole the 8th end of the tiebreaker against Chelsea Carey and went on to defeat Sherry Middaugh in the quarterfinal. They were defeated by Switzerland's Silvana Tirinzoni 9–7 in the semifinal to end their run in the slam. It marked the first time Fleury advanced to the semifinal of a Slam. Although the team struggled at the next Slam, The Masters, finishing with a 1–3 record, they quickly rebounded and made it all the way to the final of The National. Up 4–3 without hammer in the eighth and final end, the team forced Rachel Homan to execute a difficult draw to the four-foot through a port to win, which was made. A month later, they played in the 2015 Canada Cup of Curling, where they went 1–5. In their next slam, the team lost in the quarterfinals of the 2015 Meridian Canadian Open. In playdowns, the team failed in their attempt to repeat as Northern Ontario champions, losing to Krista McCarville in the final. They wrapped up their season at the 2016 Players' Championship, where they finished with a 1–4 record. The team's success from the season left them in seventh spot on the Canadian Team Ranking System.

Team Fleury began the 2016–17 Grand Slam season at the 2016 WFG Masters, going 1–3 at the event. A month later, the team lost in the quarterfinals of the 2016 Tour Challenge. Later that month, they picked up a win at The Sunova Spiel at East St. Paul World Curling Tour event. A week later, they played in the 2016 Canada Cup of Curling, which they finished with a 2–4 record. At their next slam, the 2016 National, they missed the playoffs again with a 1–3 record. They were more successful at the 2017 Meridian Canadian Open, where they lost in the quarterfinal. At the 2017 Northern Ontario Scotties Tournament of Hearts, they again lost in the final to the Krista McCarville rink. The team finished their season with another quarterfinal finish at the 2017 Players' Championship.

The team began the 2017–18 season at the 2017 Tour Challenge, where they finished with a winless 0–4 record. The next month, they picked up a tour event win at the Gord Carroll Curling Classic. After three seasons as one of the top teams in Canada, Team Fleury qualified for the 2017 Canadian Olympic Curling Pre-Trials as the number one seed. At the Pre-trials, they finished with a disappointing 2–4 record, missing the playoffs. A week later, the team rebounded by making it all the way to the semifinal of the 2017 National Grand Slam event. The team regrouped at the 2018 Northern Ontario Scotties Tournament of Hearts, defeating Krista McCarville in the final to qualify for the 2018 Scotties Tournament of Hearts. The team would finish round-robin and championship pool play with an 8–3 record, in fourth place and a spot in the playoffs. They would lose the 3 vs. 4 page playoff game to Mary-Anne Arsenault of Nova Scotia, eliminating them from the tournament. A few weeks later, the team announced they would disband at the end of the 2017–18 season, citing work and family commitments. In mixed doubles play, she teamed up with Thunder Bay's Trevor Bonot to win the Northern Ontario Mixed Doubles Championship. They finished 4–3 at the 2018 Canadian Mixed Doubles Curling Championship.

=== 2018–present ===
Gates would stay with teammate Jenna Enge who moved up to play skip and would add Oye-Sem Won Briand and Tracy Auld to play third and second respectively. The team played in the 2018 Tour Challenge Tier 2 and finished with a record of 1–3, missing the playoffs. Team Enge played in the 2019 Northern Ontario Scotties Tournament of Hearts and made it all the way to the final where they lost to rival Krista McCarville 8–7.

Gates joined the young team of Krysta Burns, Megan Smith and Sara Guy to compete in the 2020 Northern Ontario Scotties Tournament of Hearts. The team did play in one tour event together prior to provincials, the Part II Bistro Ladies Classic where they finished 1–3. Team Burns finished 5–1 through the round robin of provincials defeating Abby Deschene, 9–4, Laura Johnston, 10–6, and Amanda Gebhardt, 9–6, before losing 9–4 to Krista McCarville, following up their last two round robin games with wins over Camille Daly, 8–3, and Bella Croisier, 8–1. They defeated Laura Johnston again in the semifinal 7–5 and met undefeated McCarville in the final. It was a tight final with singles being traded back and forth most of the game before McCarville cracked two in the ninth to go ahead 6–4. Team Burns attempted a difficult shot for two on their final shot but were unsuccessful, the final score being 6–5.

Due to the COVID-19 pandemic in Ontario, the 2021 Northern Ontario Scotties Tournament of Hearts was cancelled. As the reigning provincial champions, Team McCarville was given the invitation to represent Northern Ontario at the 2021 Scotties Tournament of Hearts, but they declined due to work and family commitments. Team Burns was then given the invitation as they were the runners-up at the 2020 provincial championship, which they accepted. At the Hearts, they finished with a 2–6 round robin record, defeating Northwest Territories' Kerry Galusha and Yukon's Laura Eby.

Curling was back on for the 2022-2023 season and Gates finally teamed up with her sister Jen Gates to form a team with her mixed counterpart Jackie McCormick. They competed at the 2023 Northern Ontario Scotties Tournament of Hearts in Kenora, ON and finished 3rd.

=== Mixed ===
Gates played lead on Team Koivula, a mixed curling rink from the Fort William Curling Club out of Thunder Bay, Ontario. The team represented Northern Ontario at the 2016 Canadian Mixed Curling Championship in Toronto, Ontario, where they secured a bronze medal. Gates won first all-star lead at the event.

In 2021 Gates started playing lead for the Trevor Bonot rink (Trevor Bonot, Jackie Bonot and Michael McCarville) from the Fort William Curling Club out of Thunder Bay, Ontario. That season they won the provincial title going undefeated and beating the Dylan Johnston team in the final at the Port Arthur Curling Club. Two weeks later they competed in the 2021 Canadian Mixed Curling Championship in Canmore, Alberta and finished just outside of the playoffs. Gates and McCarville won the Sportsmanship award for their respective positions.

In 2022 Team Bonot defended their Provincial title at the Granite Curling Club in North Bay, Ontario going undefeated and defeating the Tyler Langlois team. They went on to win a silver medal at the 2022 Canadian Mixed Curling Championship in Prince Albert, Saskatchewan. Gates and Bonot were both recognized for sportsmanship at this event.

2023 saw a three-peat for Team Bonot, winning the Northern Ontario Mixed Curling Championship at the Fort Frances Curling Club. They once again went undefeated besting Dylan Johnson in the final.

== Personal life ==
Gates works as the Winter Operations and Member Services Manager at the Idylwylde Golf & Country Club. Her sister is Jen Gates.

== Teams ==
| Season | Skip | Third | Second | Lead | Alternate |
|---|---|---|---|---|---|
| 2004–05 | Tracy Horgan (Fourth) | Amanda Gates | Jennifer Horgan (Skip) | Stephanie Barbeau | |
| 2005–06 | Tracy Horgan | Lindsay Miners | Amanda Gates | Stephanie Barbeau | |
| 2006–07 | Tracy Horgan | Amanda Gates | Tara Stephen | Stephanie Barbeau | |
| 2007–08 | Tracy Horgan | Jennifer Horgan | Amanda Gates | Andrea Souliere-Poland | |
| 2008–09 | Tracy Horgan | Jennifer Horgan | Amanda Gates | Andrea Souliere-Poland | |
| 2009–10 | Tracy Horgan | Jennifer Horgan | Amanda Gates | Andrea Souliere-Poland | |
| 2010–11 | Tracy Horgan | Jennifer Seabrook | Jenna Enge | Amanda Gates | |
| 2011–12 | Tracy Horgan | Jennifer Seabrook | Jenna Enge | Amanda Gates | Jen Gates (STOH) |
| 2012–13 | Tracy Horgan | Jennifer Horgan | Jenna Enge | Amanda Gates | |
| 2013–14 | Tracy Horgan | Jennifer Horgan | Jenna Enge | Amanda Gates | Kendra Lilly (RTTR) |
| 2014–15 | Tracy Horgan | Jennifer Horgan | Jenna Enge | Amanda Gates | Courtney Chenier |
| 2015–16 | Tracy Fleury | Jennifer Horgan | Jenna Walsh | Amanda Gates | Crystal Webster |
| 2016–17 | Tracy Fleury | Jennifer Wylie | Jenna Walsh | Amanda Gates | Crystal Webster |
| 2017–18 | Tracy Fleury | Crystal Webster | Jenna Walsh | Amanda Gates | Jennifer Wylie |
| 2018–19 | Jenna Enge | Oye-Sem Won Briand | Tracy Auld | Amanda Gates | |
| 2019–20 | Krysta Burns | Megan Smith | Sara Guy | Amanda Gates | |
| 2020–21 | Krysta Burns | Megan Smith | Sara Guy | Amanda Gates | Kira Brunton |
| 2022–23 | Jackie McCormick | Crystal Taylor | Jen Gates | Amanda Gates | |
| 2023–24 | Jackie McCormick | Crystal Taylor | Jen Gates | Amanda Gates | |
