= 2009 CIS/CCA Curling Championships =

Curling championship

The 2009 edition of the CIS nationals was held in Montreal, Quebec. The event was played March 25–29, 2009 at the Royal Montreal Curling Club and Montreal West Curling Club. 12 men's and women's team were expected to participate; one representative from each province plus 2 teams from Ontario.

The Universiades are only held every 2 years, so this year's winners represented Canada at the 2010 Karuizawa Invitational in Japan.

The winners of the Championships were the University of Regina in the men's event, and Wilfrid Laurier University in the women's event.

== See also ==
- Curling
- Canadian Curling Association
- University and college curling
