= Peter Andersen (Kosovan curler) =

Canadian-Kosovan curler

- Curler
- Born: February 28, 1993 (age 32); Kingston, Ontario, Canada

Peter Andersen (born February 28, 1993) is a Canadian-Kosovan curler originally from Kingston, Ontario. He was a member of the Kosovar mixed doubles curling team which finished in 44th place at the 2019 World Mixed Doubles Curling Championship with partner Eldena Dakaj. He also competed as Skip for the Kosovar mixed curling team at the 2019 World Mixed Curling Championship where his team placed 33rd. He and Eldena also competed in the 2019 World Mixed Doubles Qualification Event where they finish 5th in their pool of 7.

He also represented Dalhousie University at the 2013 CIS/CCA Curling Championships.

Andersen moved to Kosovo in 2016. He was eligible to play for Kosovo in the 3 world level competitions in 2019 as he had been living there for more than two years.

In 2022, he returned to Canada to manage the Whitehorse Curling Club. He played for the Yukon at the 2022 Canadian Mixed Curling Championship and will play for the Yukon men's team at the 2022 Canadian Curling Club Championships. He currently lives in Whitehorse.
