= 2017 Ontario Tankard =

- Host city: Cobourg, Ontario
- Arena: Cobourg Community Centre
- Dates: January 29–February 5
- Winner: Glenn Howard
- Curling club: St. George's G&CC, Etobicoke, Toronto
- Skip: Glenn Howard
- Third: Richard Hart
- Second: David Mathers
- Lead: Scott Howard
- Finalist: Wayne Tuck Jr.

The 2017 Recharge With Milk Men's Tankard, better known as the Ontario Tankard was the 2017 edition of the Ontario men's provincial curling championship to determine who will represent the province of Ontario at the 2017 Tim Hortons Brier, the national curling championship of Canada. In 2017, the Tankard was contesteded in conjunction with the 2017 Ontario Scotties Tournament of Hearts, at the Cobourg Community Centre in Cobourg, Ontario, January 29-February 5, 2017.

Ten teams played a round robin competition, followed by a page playoff to determine the tournament champion.

A 54 year old Glenn Howard led his team to win his 17th career provincial championship, qualifying himself for a record 17th Brier.

== Teams ==
The teams are as follows:

| Skip | Third | Second | Lead | Alternate | Club |
|---|---|---|---|---|---|
| Scott Bailey | Travis Fanset | Joe Frans | Craig Van Ymeren | | Dundas Granite Club, Dundas, Hamilton |
| Greg Balsdon | Don Bowser | Jonathan Beuk | Scott Chadwick | | Cataraqui Golf and Country Club, Kingston |
| Mark Bice | Adam Spencer | Tyler Morgan | Steve Bice | | Sarnia Golf & Curling Club, Sarnia |
| Dayna Deruelle | Kevin Flewwelling | David Staples | Sean Harrison | | Cataraqui Golf and Country Club, Kingston |
| John Epping | Mathew Camm | Patrick Janssen | Tim March | | Leaside Curling Club, East York, Toronto |
| Mike Harris | Mike Anderson | Scott Hodgson | Scott Foster | | Toronto Cricket, Skating and Curling Club, North York, Toronto |
| Cory Heggestad | Andrew Thompson | Wylie Allen | Kelly Schuh | Darryl MacKenznie | Stroud Curling Club, Stroud |
| Glenn Howard | Richard Hart | David Mathers | Scott Howard | | St. George's Golf and Country Club, Etobicoke, Toronto |
| Scott McDonald | Codey Maus (skip) | Wesley Forget | Jeff Grant | | Highland Country Club, London |
| Wayne Tuck Jr. | Chad Allen | Kurt Armstrong | Matt Pretty | | Brantford Golf & Country Club, Brantford |

== Round-robin standings ==
Key
| Teams to Playoffs |
| Teams to Tiebreaker |

| Skip (Club) | W | L | PF | PA | Ends Won | Ends Lost | Blank Ends | Stolen Ends |
|---|---|---|---|---|---|---|---|---|
| John Epping (Leaside) | 8 | 1 | 73 | 53 | 42 | 34 | 8 | 12 |
| Glenn Howard (St. George's) | 6 | 3 | 79 | 54 | 41 | 36 | 16 | 12 |
| Scott Bailey (Dundas Granite) | 6 | 3 | 61 | 51 | 42 | 31 | 10 | 14 |
| Wayne Tuck, Jr. (Brantford) | 5 | 4 | 79 | 70 | 46 | 43 | 6 | 10 |
| Codey Maus (Highland) | 5 | 4 | 74 | 72 | 43 | 40 | 9 | 9 |
| Greg Balsdon (Cataraqui) | 5 | 4 | 67 | 65 | 40 | 42 | 7 | 13 |
| Mark Bice (Sarnia) | 4 | 5 | 48 | 48 | 32 | 33 | 17 | 8 |
| Dayna Deruelle (Cataraqui) | 3 | 6 | 48 | 59 | 27 | 41 | 13 | 5 |
| Cory Heggestad (Stroud) | 2 | 7 | 43 | 72 | 29 | 39 | 7 | 6 |
| Mike Harris (Toronto Cricket) | 1 | 8 | 53 | 81 | 35 | 38 | 7 | 7 |

== Round-robin results ==
=== Draw 1 ===
Sunday, January 29, 7:00pm

| Sheet A | 1 | 2 | 3 | 4 | 5 | 6 | 7 | 8 | 9 | 10 | Final |
|---|---|---|---|---|---|---|---|---|---|---|---|
| Mike Harris | 1 | 0 | 1 | 0 | 2 | 0 | 1 | 0 | X | X | 5 |
| John Epping 🔨 | 0 | 3 | 0 | 2 | 0 | 2 | 0 | 2 | X | X | 9 |

| Sheet B | 1 | 2 | 3 | 4 | 5 | 6 | 7 | 8 | 9 | 10 | Final |
|---|---|---|---|---|---|---|---|---|---|---|---|
| Mark Bice 🔨 | 0 | 0 | 2 | 0 | 2 | 0 | 1 | 0 | 2 | X | 7 |
| Dayna Deruelle | 0 | 0 | 0 | 2 | 0 | 0 | 0 | 0 | 0 | X | 2 |

| Sheet C | 1 | 2 | 3 | 4 | 5 | 6 | 7 | 8 | 9 | 10 | Final |
|---|---|---|---|---|---|---|---|---|---|---|---|
| Glenn Howard 🔨 | 0 | 2 | 0 | 3 | 0 | 0 | 3 | 0 | X | X | 8 |
| Cory Heggestad | 0 | 0 | 1 | 0 | 1 | 0 | 0 | 1 | X | X | 3 |

| Sheet D | 1 | 2 | 3 | 4 | 5 | 6 | 7 | 8 | 9 | 10 | 11 | Final |
|---|---|---|---|---|---|---|---|---|---|---|---|---|
| Wayne Tuck Jr. 🔨 | 2 | 0 | 3 | 0 | 0 | 0 | 0 | 2 | 0 | 2 | 0 | 9 |
| Scott Bailey | 0 | 1 | 0 | 1 | 3 | 0 | 3 | 0 | 1 | 0 | 3 | 12 |

| Sheet E | 1 | 2 | 3 | 4 | 5 | 6 | 7 | 8 | 9 | 10 | Final |
|---|---|---|---|---|---|---|---|---|---|---|---|
| Greg Balsdon | 0 | 2 | 0 | 0 | 2 | 0 | 1 | 0 | X | X | 5 |
| Codey Maus 🔨 | 2 | 0 | 2 | 1 | 0 | 1 | 0 | 4 | X | X | 10 |

=== Draw 2 ===
Monday, January 30, 9:00am

| Sheet A | 1 | 2 | 3 | 4 | 5 | 6 | 7 | 8 | 9 | 10 | Final |
|---|---|---|---|---|---|---|---|---|---|---|---|
| Mark Bice 🔨 | 1 | 0 | 0 | 1 | 2 | 0 | 0 | 3 | X | X | 7 |
| Greg Balsdon | 0 | 0 | 0 | 0 | 0 | 1 | 1 | 0 | X | X | 2 |

| Sheet B | 1 | 2 | 3 | 4 | 5 | 6 | 7 | 8 | 9 | 10 | Final |
|---|---|---|---|---|---|---|---|---|---|---|---|
| John Epping 🔨 | 2 | 0 | 5 | 1 | 1 | X | X | X | X | X | 9 |
| Cory Heggestad | 0 | 1 | 0 | 0 | 0 | X | X | X | X | X | 1 |

| Sheet C | 1 | 2 | 3 | 4 | 5 | 6 | 7 | 8 | 9 | 10 | Final |
|---|---|---|---|---|---|---|---|---|---|---|---|
| Mike Harris | 0 | 0 | 2 | 0 | 0 | 0 | 1 | 0 | X | X | 3 |
| Scott Bailey 🔨 | 0 | 1 | 0 | 2 | 1 | 2 | 0 | 2 | X | X | 8 |

| Sheet D | 1 | 2 | 3 | 4 | 5 | 6 | 7 | 8 | 9 | 10 | Final |
|---|---|---|---|---|---|---|---|---|---|---|---|
| Dayna Deruelle | 0 | 0 | 1 | 2 | 0 | 1 | 0 | 5 | X | X | 9 |
| Codey Maus 🔨 | 1 | 1 | 0 | 0 | 1 | 0 | 1 | 0 | X | X | 4 |

| Sheet E | 1 | 2 | 3 | 4 | 5 | 6 | 7 | 8 | 9 | 10 | Final |
|---|---|---|---|---|---|---|---|---|---|---|---|
| Glenn Howard | 0 | 2 | 1 | 0 | 0 | 3 | 2 | 0 | 3 | X | 11 |
| Wayne Tuck Jr. 🔨 | 2 | 0 | 0 | 2 | 1 | 0 | 0 | 1 | 0 | X | 6 |

=== Draw 3 ===
Monday, January 30, 3:00pm

| Sheet A | 1 | 2 | 3 | 4 | 5 | 6 | 7 | 8 | 9 | 10 | Final |
|---|---|---|---|---|---|---|---|---|---|---|---|
| Glenn Howard 🔨 | 2 | 0 | 0 | 0 | 2 | 0 | 0 | 2 | 1 | X | 7 |
| Dayna Deruelle | 0 | 0 | 1 | 0 | 0 | 2 | 0 | 0 | 0 | X | 3 |

| Sheet B | 1 | 2 | 3 | 4 | 5 | 6 | 7 | 8 | 9 | 10 | Final |
|---|---|---|---|---|---|---|---|---|---|---|---|
| Scott Bailey 🔨 | 1 | 0 | 0 | 0 | 3 | 0 | 4 | X | X | X | 8 |
| Codey Maus | 0 | 0 | 0 | 1 | 0 | 2 | 0 | X | X | X | 3 |

| Sheet C | 1 | 2 | 3 | 4 | 5 | 6 | 7 | 8 | 9 | 10 | Final |
|---|---|---|---|---|---|---|---|---|---|---|---|
| Wayne Tuck Jr. 🔨 | 0 | 3 | 0 | 1 | 1 | 0 | 1 | 0 | 1 | 0 | 7 |
| John Epping | 3 | 0 | 2 | 0 | 0 | 2 | 0 | 1 | 0 | 1 | 9 |

| Sheet D | 1 | 2 | 3 | 4 | 5 | 6 | 7 | 8 | 9 | 10 | Final |
|---|---|---|---|---|---|---|---|---|---|---|---|
| Greg Balsdon | 1 | 1 | 5 | 0 | 4 | X | X | X | X | X | 11 |
| Cory Heggestad 🔨 | 0 | 0 | 0 | 2 | 0 | X | X | X | X | X | 2 |

| Sheet E | 1 | 2 | 3 | 4 | 5 | 6 | 7 | 8 | 9 | 10 | Final |
|---|---|---|---|---|---|---|---|---|---|---|---|
| Mark Bice 🔨 | 0 | 2 | 2 | 0 | 1 | 0 | 2 | 0 | 0 | X | 7 |
| Mike Harris | 1 | 0 | 0 | 2 | 0 | 0 | 0 | 0 | 2 | X | 5 |

=== Draw 6 ===
Tuesday, January 31, 2:30pm

| Sheet A | 1 | 2 | 3 | 4 | 5 | 6 | 7 | 8 | 9 | 10 | Final |
|---|---|---|---|---|---|---|---|---|---|---|---|
| John Epping 🔨 | 3 | 0 | 1 | 0 | 2 | 1 | X | X | X | X | 7 |
| Scott Bailey | 0 | 1 | 0 | 1 | 0 | 0 | X | X | X | X | 2 |

| Sheet B | 1 | 2 | 3 | 4 | 5 | 6 | 7 | 8 | 9 | 10 | Final |
|---|---|---|---|---|---|---|---|---|---|---|---|
| Glenn Howard 🔨 | 2 | 0 | 2 | 0 | 0 | 1 | 0 | 1 | 1 | 1 | 8 |
| Mark Bice | 0 | 2 | 0 | 3 | 0 | 0 | 1 | 0 | 0 | 0 | 6 |

| Sheet C | 1 | 2 | 3 | 4 | 5 | 6 | 7 | 8 | 9 | 10 | Final |
|---|---|---|---|---|---|---|---|---|---|---|---|
| Dayna Deruelle 🔨 | 1 | 1 | 0 | 0 | 2 | 0 | 0 | 0 | 0 | 1 | 5 |
| Greg Balsdon | 0 | 0 | 1 | 2 | 0 | 1 | 1 | 1 | 1 | 0 | 7 |

| Sheet D | 1 | 2 | 3 | 4 | 5 | 6 | 7 | 8 | 9 | 10 | Final |
|---|---|---|---|---|---|---|---|---|---|---|---|
| Mike Harris 🔨 | 1 | 0 | 0 | 2 | 0 | 1 | 0 | 1 | 0 | X | 5 |
| Wayne Tuck Jr. | 0 | 1 | 1 | 0 | 2 | 0 | 3 | 0 | 3 | X | 10 |

| Sheet E | 1 | 2 | 3 | 4 | 5 | 6 | 7 | 8 | 9 | 10 | Final |
|---|---|---|---|---|---|---|---|---|---|---|---|
| Codey Maus | 0 | 3 | 0 | 2 | 2 | 1 | 0 | 0 | 0 | 1 | 9 |
| Cory Heggestad 🔨 | 1 | 0 | 1 | 0 | 0 | 0 | 2 | 1 | 2 | 0 | 7 |

=== Draw 7 ===
Tuesday, January 31, 7:30pm

| Sheet C | 1 | 2 | 3 | 4 | 5 | 6 | 7 | 8 | 9 | 10 | Final |
|---|---|---|---|---|---|---|---|---|---|---|---|
| Mark Bice | 0 | 1 | 0 | 0 | 1 | 0 | 1 | 0 | X | X | 3 |
| Codey Maus 🔨 | 3 | 0 | 1 | 1 | 0 | 1 | 0 | 1 | X | X | 7 |

| Sheet D | 1 | 2 | 3 | 4 | 5 | 6 | 7 | 8 | 9 | 10 | Final |
|---|---|---|---|---|---|---|---|---|---|---|---|
| John Epping 🔨 | 2 | 0 | 0 | 1 | 0 | 2 | 1 | X | X | X | 6 |
| Dayna Deruelle | 0 | 0 | 0 | 0 | 1 | 0 | 0 | X | X | X | 1 |

| Sheet E | 1 | 2 | 3 | 4 | 5 | 6 | 7 | 8 | 9 | 10 | Final |
|---|---|---|---|---|---|---|---|---|---|---|---|
| Scott Bailey | 0 | 1 | 0 | 0 | 1 | 1 | 1 | 1 | 0 | 0 | 5 |
| Glenn Howard 🔨 | 2 | 0 | 0 | 2 | 0 | 0 | 0 | 0 | 1 | 2 | 7 |

=== Draw 8 ===
Wednesday, February 1, 9:30am

| Sheet A | 1 | 2 | 3 | 4 | 5 | 6 | 7 | 8 | 9 | 10 | Final |
|---|---|---|---|---|---|---|---|---|---|---|---|
| Cory Heggestad 🔨 | 1 | 0 | 0 | 1 | 0 | 2 | 0 | 3 | 0 | 1 | 8 |
| Mike Harris | 0 | 1 | 1 | 0 | 2 | 0 | 0 | 0 | 2 | 0 | 6 |

| Sheet B | 1 | 2 | 3 | 4 | 5 | 6 | 7 | 8 | 9 | 10 | Final |
|---|---|---|---|---|---|---|---|---|---|---|---|
| Wayne Tuck Jr. 🔨 | 1 | 0 | 2 | 0 | 2 | 0 | 2 | 2 | 0 | X | 9 |
| Greg Balsdon | 0 | 1 | 0 | 1 | 0 | 3 | 0 | 0 | 1 | X | 6 |

=== Draw 9 ===
Wednesday, February 1, 2:30pm

| Sheet A | 1 | 2 | 3 | 4 | 5 | 6 | 7 | 8 | 9 | 10 | Final |
|---|---|---|---|---|---|---|---|---|---|---|---|
| Wayne Tuck Jr. | 0 | 2 | 0 | 2 | 0 | 2 | 0 | 2 | 0 | X | 8 |
| Codey Maus 🔨 | 2 | 0 | 1 | 0 | 1 | 0 | 2 | 0 | 1 | X | 7 |

| Sheet B | 1 | 2 | 3 | 4 | 5 | 6 | 7 | 8 | 9 | 10 | 11 | Final |
|---|---|---|---|---|---|---|---|---|---|---|---|---|
| Mike Harris 🔨 | 0 | 3 | 0 | 0 | 1 | 3 | 0 | 0 | 1 | 0 | 1 | 9 |
| Glenn Howard | 0 | 0 | 1 | 0 | 0 | 0 | 3 | 1 | 0 | 3 | 0 | 8 |

=== Draw 10 ===
Wednesday, February 1, 7:30pm

| Sheet C | 1 | 2 | 3 | 4 | 5 | 6 | 7 | 8 | 9 | 10 | Final |
|---|---|---|---|---|---|---|---|---|---|---|---|
| Scott Bailey | 0 | 1 | 1 | 0 | 1 | 2 | 0 | 0 | 1 | 1 | 7 |
| Dayna Deruelle 🔨 | 2 | 0 | 0 | 1 | 0 | 0 | 0 | 2 | 0 | 0 | 5 |

| Sheet D | 1 | 2 | 3 | 4 | 5 | 6 | 7 | 8 | 9 | 10 | Final |
|---|---|---|---|---|---|---|---|---|---|---|---|
| Cory Heggestad 🔨 | 2 | 0 | 1 | 0 | 2 | 1 | 2 | 0 | 0 | X | 8 |
| Mark Bice | 0 | 1 | 0 | 3 | 0 | 0 | 0 | 1 | 1 | X | 6 |

| Sheet E | 1 | 2 | 3 | 4 | 5 | 6 | 7 | 8 | 9 | 10 | 11 | Final |
|---|---|---|---|---|---|---|---|---|---|---|---|---|
| John Epping | 0 | 3 | 0 | 1 | 1 | 0 | 1 | 0 | 2 | 0 | 1 | 9 |
| Greg Balsdon 🔨 | 2 | 0 | 2 | 0 | 0 | 1 | 0 | 2 | 0 | 1 | 0 | 8 |

=== Draw 11 ===
Thursday, February 2, 9:30am

| Sheet A | 1 | 2 | 3 | 4 | 5 | 6 | 7 | 8 | 9 | 10 | Final |
|---|---|---|---|---|---|---|---|---|---|---|---|
| Scott Bailey 🔨 | 1 | 0 | 0 | 0 | 2 | 1 | 0 | 1 | 0 | 1 | 6 |
| Mark Bice | 0 | 0 | 1 | 0 | 0 | 0 | 1 | 0 | 1 | 0 | 3 |

| Sheet B | 1 | 2 | 3 | 4 | 5 | 6 | 7 | 8 | 9 | 10 | Final |
|---|---|---|---|---|---|---|---|---|---|---|---|
| Codey Maus 🔨 | 0 | 2 | 0 | 3 | 0 | 2 | 0 | 1 | 3 | X | 11 |
| John Epping | 1 | 0 | 2 | 0 | 2 | 0 | 1 | 0 | 0 | X | 6 |

=== Draw 12 ===
Thursday, February 2, 2:30pm

| Sheet C | 1 | 2 | 3 | 4 | 5 | 6 | 7 | 8 | 9 | 10 | Final |
|---|---|---|---|---|---|---|---|---|---|---|---|
| Cory Heggestad | 0 | 1 | 0 | 0 | 0 | 4 | 0 | 0 | 0 | X | 5 |
| Wayne Tuck Jr. 🔨 | 1 | 0 | 2 | 1 | 1 | 0 | 0 | 2 | 1 | X | 8 |

| Sheet D | 1 | 2 | 3 | 4 | 5 | 6 | 7 | 8 | 9 | 10 | Final |
|---|---|---|---|---|---|---|---|---|---|---|---|
| Glenn Howard 🔨 | 0 | 2 | 0 | 0 | 2 | 0 | 0 | 1 | 0 | 0 | 5 |
| Greg Balsdon | 0 | 0 | 1 | 0 | 0 | 1 | 1 | 0 | 2 | 1 | 6 |

| Sheet E | 1 | 2 | 3 | 4 | 5 | 6 | 7 | 8 | 9 | 10 | Final |
|---|---|---|---|---|---|---|---|---|---|---|---|
| Mike Harris 🔨 | 2 | 0 | 1 | 1 | 2 | 0 | 2 | 0 | 1 | 0 | 9 |
| Dayna Deruelle | 0 | 1 | 0 | 0 | 0 | 2 | 0 | 4 | 0 | 3 | 10 |

=== Draw 13 ===
Thursday, February 2, 7:30pm

| Sheet C | 1 | 2 | 3 | 4 | 5 | 6 | 7 | 8 | 9 | 10 | Final |
|---|---|---|---|---|---|---|---|---|---|---|---|
| John Epping 🔨 | 0 | 0 | 2 | 0 | 3 | 0 | 0 | 2 | 1 | X | 8 |
| Glenn Howard | 1 | 2 | 0 | 2 | 0 | 0 | 1 | 0 | 0 | X | 6 |

| Sheet D | 1 | 2 | 3 | 4 | 5 | 6 | 7 | 8 | 9 | 10 | Final |
|---|---|---|---|---|---|---|---|---|---|---|---|
| Codey Maus | 0 | 2 | 0 | 0 | 5 | 0 | 4 | X | X | X | 11 |
| Mike Harris 🔨 | 2 | 0 | 1 | 0 | 0 | 3 | 0 | X | X | X | 6 |

| Sheet E | 1 | 2 | 3 | 4 | 5 | 6 | 7 | 8 | 9 | 10 | Final |
|---|---|---|---|---|---|---|---|---|---|---|---|
| Wayne Tuck Jr. | 0 | 0 | 0 | 0 | 2 | 0 | 2 | 0 | 2 | 0 | 6 |
| Mark Bice 🔨 | 0 | 1 | 1 | 0 | 0 | 3 | 0 | 1 | 0 | 1 | 7 |

=== Draw 14 ===
Friday, February 3, 9:30am

| Sheet A | 1 | 2 | 3 | 4 | 5 | 6 | 7 | 8 | 9 | 10 | Final |
|---|---|---|---|---|---|---|---|---|---|---|---|
| Dayna Deruelle 🔨 | 4 | 2 | 0 | 0 | 1 | 0 | 0 | 1 | X | X | 8 |
| Cory Heggestad | 0 | 0 | 0 | 1 | 0 | 0 | 2 | 0 | X | X | 3 |

| Sheet B | 1 | 2 | 3 | 4 | 5 | 6 | 7 | 8 | 9 | 10 | Final |
|---|---|---|---|---|---|---|---|---|---|---|---|
| Greg Balsdon 🔨 | 0 | 0 | 4 | 1 | 0 | 0 | 0 | 2 | 0 | 1 | 8 |
| Scott Bailey | 0 | 1 | 0 | 0 | 2 | 1 | 1 | 0 | 1 | 0 | 6 |

=== Draw 16 ===
Friday, February 3, 7:30pm

| Sheet A | 1 | 2 | 3 | 4 | 5 | 6 | 7 | 8 | 9 | 10 | Final |
|---|---|---|---|---|---|---|---|---|---|---|---|
| Codey Maus | 0 | 0 | 0 | 0 | 2 | 0 | 0 | X | X | X | 2 |
| Glenn Howard 🔨 | 0 | 4 | 0 | 0 | 0 | 3 | 2 | X | X | X | 9 |

| Sheet B | 1 | 2 | 3 | 4 | 5 | 6 | 7 | 8 | 9 | 10 | Final |
|---|---|---|---|---|---|---|---|---|---|---|---|
| Dayna Deruelle | 0 | 1 | 0 | 2 | 1 | 0 | 0 | 1 | 0 | 0 | 5 |
| Wayne Tuck Jr. 🔨 | 0 | 0 | 2 | 0 | 0 | 1 | 1 | 0 | 2 | 3 | 9 |

| Sheet C | 1 | 2 | 3 | 4 | 5 | 6 | 7 | 8 | 9 | 10 | Final |
|---|---|---|---|---|---|---|---|---|---|---|---|
| Greg Balsdon 🔨 | 2 | 0 | 0 | 2 | 0 | 3 | 0 | 3 | X | X | 10 |
| Mike Harris | 0 | 2 | 1 | 0 | 1 | 0 | 1 | 0 | X | X | 5 |

| Sheet D | 1 | 2 | 3 | 4 | 5 | 6 | 7 | 8 | 9 | 10 | Final |
|---|---|---|---|---|---|---|---|---|---|---|---|
| Mark Bice 🔨 | 0 | 0 | 0 | 1 | 0 | 0 | 0 | 1 | 0 | X | 2 |
| John Epping | 0 | 2 | 1 | 0 | 1 | 0 | 0 | 0 | 0 | X | 4 |

== Tiebreaker 1 ==
Saturday, February 4, 9:00am

| Sheet A | 1 | 2 | 3 | 4 | 5 | 6 | 7 | 8 | 9 | 10 | Final |
|---|---|---|---|---|---|---|---|---|---|---|---|
| Greg Balsdon | 2 | 0 | 0 | 0 | 0 | 1 | 1 | 0 | 0 | 0 | 4 |
| Codey Maus 🔨 | 0 | 0 | 1 | 0 | 1 | 0 | 0 | 2 | 1 | 2 | 7 |

== Tie Breaker 2 ==
Saturday, February 4, 2:00pm

| Sheet A | 1 | 2 | 3 | 4 | 5 | 6 | 7 | 8 | 9 | 10 | Final |
|---|---|---|---|---|---|---|---|---|---|---|---|
| Wayne Tuck Jr. 🔨 | 2 | 1 | 0 | 1 | 0 | 0 | 2 | 0 | 1 | X | 7 |
| Codey Maus | 0 | 0 | 1 | 0 | 0 | 1 | 0 | 1 | 0 | X | 3 |

== Playoffs ==
Page playoff system
1 | John Epping | 6
2 | Glenn Howard | 10
3 | Scott Bailey | 7
4 | Wayne Tuck Jr. | 8

Semifinal
1 | John Epping | 7
4 | Wayne Tuck Jr. | 9

Final
2 | Glenn Howard | 8
4 | Wayne Tuck Jr. | 6

=== 1 vs. 2 ===
Saturday, February 4, 2:00pm

| Sheet C | 1 | 2 | 3 | 4 | 5 | 6 | 7 | 8 | 9 | 10 | Final |
|---|---|---|---|---|---|---|---|---|---|---|---|
| John Epping 🔨 | 1 | 0 | 2 | 1 | 0 | 2 | 0 | 0 | 0 | 0 | 6 |
| Glenn Howard | 0 | 1 | 0 | 0 | 2 | 0 | 0 | 2 | 2 | 3 | 10 |

=== 3 vs. 4 ===
Saturday, February 4, 7:00pm

| Sheet C | 1 | 2 | 3 | 4 | 5 | 6 | 7 | 8 | 9 | 10 | Final |
|---|---|---|---|---|---|---|---|---|---|---|---|
| Scott Bailey 🔨 | 2 | 0 | 0 | 1 | 0 | 3 | 0 | 1 | 0 | 0 | 7 |
| Wayne Tuck Jr. | 0 | 1 | 1 | 0 | 2 | 0 | 1 | 0 | 2 | 2 | 9 |

=== Semifinal ===
Sunday, February 5, 9:00am

| Sheet C | 1 | 2 | 3 | 4 | 5 | 6 | 7 | 8 | 9 | 10 | Final |
|---|---|---|---|---|---|---|---|---|---|---|---|
| John Epping 🔨 | 0 | 3 | 2 | 1 | 0 | 1 | 0 | 0 | 0 | 0 | 7 |
| Wayne Tuck Jr. | 1 | 0 | 0 | 0 | 3 | 0 | 1 | 1 | 1 | 2 | 9 |

=== Final ===
Sunday, February 5, 4:00pm

| Sheet C | 1 | 2 | 3 | 4 | 5 | 6 | 7 | 8 | 9 | 10 | Final |
|---|---|---|---|---|---|---|---|---|---|---|---|
| Glenn Howard 🔨 | 1 | 0 | 0 | 2 | 2 | 0 | 0 | 3 | 0 | X | 8 |
| Wayne Tuck Jr. | 0 | 0 | 3 | 0 | 0 | 0 | 2 | 0 | 1 | X | 6 |

2017 Ontario Tankard

Glenn Howard
17th Ontario Provincial Championship title

== Qualification Process ==
Qualifying for the men's Tankard has changed for 2017. Ten teams will qualify from two provincial qualifiers (three each) and a challenge round. The top two southern Ontario teams in the CTRS standings (as of December 4) will also qualify. The provincial qualifiers are preceded by four regional qualifiers in which at least three teams qualify for the provincial qualifiers, plus the teams ranked 3-10 on the CTRS standings

| Qualification method | Berths | Qualifying team |
|---|---|---|
| CTRS leaders | 2 | John Epping; Greg Balsdon |
| Qualifier A (at Ottawa) | 3 | Glenn Howard; Dayna Deruelle; Codey Maus |
| Qualifier B (at Niagara Falls) | 3 | Mark Bice; Wayne Tuck Jr. Scott Bailey |
| Challenge Round | 2 | Mike Harris; Cory Heggestad |

=== (Regional) Qualifiers ===
==== Qualifier #1 ====
December 17–18, at the RCMP Curling Club, Ottawa

Teams entered:

- Jamie Britwistle (Ottawa)
- Kurtis Byrd (Cataraqui)
- Bryan Cochrane (Russell)
- Dave Collyer (Quinte)
- Ritchie Gillan (Ottawa)
- Francis Hawco (Rideau)
- Jake Higgs (West Northumberland)
- Bryan Lewis (Rideau)
- Jason Reid (Rideau)
- Spencer Richmond (Perth)

Brackets:

| A1 | | Semifinal | | Final |
| | | Gillan | 6 |
| | | Collyer | 8 |
| | | | | Collyer | 4 |
| Reid | 2 | | | Higgs | 7 |
| Birtwistle | 6 | Higgs | 7 |
| | | Birtwistle | 4 |

A2
Hawco | 9
Richmond | 8

Semifinal
Hawco | 5
Cochrane | 7
Byrd | 5
Lewis | 6

Final
Lewis | 7
Cochrane | 6

| B1 | | Semifinal | | Final |
| | | | | Cochrane | 8 |
| Richmond | 9 | | | Richmond | 2 |
| Gillan | 4 | Birtwistle | 9 |
| | | Richmond | 10 |

| B2 | | Semifinal | | Final |
| | | | | Byrd | 8 |
| | | | | Collyer | 12 |
| | | Hawco | 3 |
| Byrd | 6 | Byrd | 11 |
| Reid | 5 |

==== Qualifier #2 ====
December 17, at the Oakville Curling Club, Oakville

Teams entered:

- Rob Ainsley (Royal Canadian)
- Mike Harris (Toronto Cricket)
- Josh Johnston (Royal Canadian)
- Codey Maus (Highland)
- Patrick Morris (High Park)
- Hugh Murphy (Mississaugua)
- Rob Retchless (Royal Canadian)
- Chris Van Huyse (Scarboro)

Brackets:

| A1 | | Final |
| Morris | 2 |
| Maus | 10 | Johnston | 6 |
| Johnston | 8 | Maus | 9 |
| Retchless | 4 |

| A2 | | Final |
| Murphy | 3 |
| Harris | 9 | Van Huyse | 4 |
| Ainsley | 5 | Harris | 6 |
| Van Huyse | 8 |

| B1 | | Final |
| Retchless | 8 |
| Morris | 6 | Retchless | 6 |
| | | Van Huyse | 7 |

| B2 | | Final |
| Ainsley | 8 |
| Murphy | 3 | Johnston | 7 |
| | | Ainsley | 8 |

==== Qualifier #3 ====
December 17–18, at the Barrie Curling Club, Barrie

Teams entered:

- John Bolton (Lindsay)
- Dave Coutanche (Richmond Hill)
- Ian Dickie (York)
- Connor Duhaime (Cookstown)
- Brent Gray (Bayview)
- Cory Heggestad (Stroud)
- Richard Krell (Kitchener-Waterloo Granite)
- Rob Lobel (Thornhill)
- Gregory Park (Oshawa)
- Brent Ross (Harriston)
- Michael Shepherd (Richmond Hill)
- Chris Wimmer (Stroud)

Brackets:

| A1 | | Semifinal | | Final |
| | | Ross | 3 |
| Lobel | 5 | Gray | 10 |
| Gray | 6 | | | Heggestad | 7 |
| Heggestad | 9 | | | Gray | 9 |
| Park | 3 | Heggestad | 4 |
| | | Duhaime | 2 |

| A2 | | Semifinal | | Final |
| | | Bolton | 4 |
| Bolton | 7 | Krell | 7 |
| Wimmer | 2 | | | Dickie | 2 |
| Shepherd | 4 | | | Krell | 6 |
| Coutanche | 7 | Dickie | 5 |
| | | Coutanche | 3 |

| B1 | | Semifinal | | Final |
| | | | | Dickie | 1 |
| Ross | 8 | | | Shepherd | 7 |
| Wimmer | 6 | Ross | 2 |
| Duhaime | 1 | Shepherd | 7 |
| Shepherd | 7 |

| B2 | | Semifinal | | Final |
| | | | | Lobel | 7 |
| Lobel | 7 | | | Heggestad | 3 |
| Bolton | 1 | Lobel | 9 |
| Park | 6 | Coutanche | 2 |
| Coutanche | 7 |

==== Qualifier #4 ====
December 17–18, at the Chatham Granite Club, Chatham

Teams entered:

- Scott Bailey (Dundas Granite)
- Bill Buchanan (Welland)
- Glenn Garneys (London)
- Dale Kelly (Chatham Granite)
- Rick Law (Kingsville)
- Ryan LeDrew (Sarnia)
- Drew Macklin (Burlington)
- Nathan Martin (Oshawa)
- Kirk Massey (Ilderton)
- Daryl Shane (Kitchener-Waterloo Granite)
- Jon St. Denis (Listowel)
- Wayne Tuck Jr. (Brantford)

Brackets:

| A1 | | Semifinal | | Final |
| | | Bailey | 9 |
| Martin | 9 | Martin | 5 |
| Law | 3 | | | St. Denis | 4 |
| Massey | 5 | | | Bailey | 8 |
| Shane | 9 | Shane | 5 |
| | | St. Denis | 8 |

| A2 | | Semifinal | | Final |
| | | Tuck | 5 |
| Garneys | 7 | Buchanan | 8 |
| Buchanan | 8 | | | Kelly | 8 |
| Kelly | 12 | | | Buchanan | 5 |
| Macklin | 4 | LeDrew | 6 |
| | | Kelly | 11 |

| B1 | | Semifinal | | Final |
| | | | | Buchanan | 6 |
| Martin | 8 | | | Martin | 8 |
| Garneys | 7 | Macklin | 1 |
| Macklin | 9 | Martin | 8 |
| Shane | 7 |

| B2 | | Semifinal | | Final |
| | | | | Tuck | 8 |
| Law | 4 | | | St. Denis | 7 |
| Tuck | 12 | LeDrew | 0 |
| Massey | 3 | Tuck | 7 |
| LeDrew | 9 |

=== Provincial Qualifiers ===
==== Qualifier A ====
January 7–8, RCMP Curling Club, Ottawa

CTRS qualified teams:

- Dayna Deruelle (Cataraqui)
- Colin Dow (RCMP)
- Glenn Howard (St. George's)
- Sebastien Robillard (Ottawa)

Brackets:

A Side
Bryan Cochrane | 7
Brian Lewis | 5
Codey Maus | 10
Rob Ainsley | 4
Team Mike Harris | 11
Dave Collyer | 10
Jake Higgs | 5
Chris Van Huyse | 9

Quarterfinals
Dayna Deruelle | 7
Bryan Cochrane | 6
Sebastien Robillard | 3
Codey Maus | 5
Colin Dow | 8
Team Mike Harris | 6
Glenn Howard | 5
Chris Van Huyse | 2

Semifinals
Dayna Deruelle | 8
Codey Maus | 4
Colin Dow | 5
Glenn Howard | 6

A Final
Dayna Deruelle | 7
Glenn Howard | 9

| B1 | | Semifinal | | Final |
| | | | | Dave Collyer | 2 |
| Sebastien Robillard | 6 | | | Dayna Deruelle | 7 |
| Dave Collyer | 11 | Dave Collyer | 6 |
| Team Mike Harris | 9 | Team Mike Harris | 4 |
| Rob Ainsley | 4 |

B2
Bryan Cochrane | 9
Jake Higgs | 5
Chris Van Huyse | 6
Brian Lewis | 11

Semifinal
Bryan Cochrane | 6
Codey Maus | 9
Brian Lewis | 4
Colin Dow | 6

Final
Codey Maus | 11
Colin Dow | 8

==== Qualifier B ====
January 7–8, Niagara Falls Curling Club, Niagara Falls

CTRS qualified teams:

- Mark Bice (Sarnia)
- Pat Ferris (Grimsby)
- Chris Gardner (Loonie)
- Ryan McCrady (Rideau)

Brackets:

A Side
Rob Lobel | 10
Michael Shepherd | 11
Scott Bailey | 9
Nathan Martin | 3
Richard Krell | 8
Dale Kelly | 9
Wayne Tuck Jr. | 8
Brent Gray | 4

Quarterfinals
Mark Bice | 7
Michael Shepherd | 1
Ryan McCrady | 6
Scott Bailey | 11
Pat Ferris | 4
Dale Kelly | 9
Chris Gardner | 6
Wayne Tuck Jr. | 7

Semifinals
Mark Bice | 10
Scott Bailey | 5
Dale Kelly | 7
Wayne Tuck Jr. | 10

A Final
Mark Bice | 9
Wayne Tuck Jr. | 2

| B1 | | Semifinal | | Final |
| | | | | Pat Ferris | 3 |
| Ryan McCrady | 6 | | | Wayne Tuck Jr. | 9 |
| Richard Krell | 3 | Ryan McCrady | 7 |
| Pat Ferris | 6 | Pat Ferris | 8 |
| Nathan Martin | 2 |

B2
Michael Shepherd | 8
Brent Gray | 2
Chris Gardner | 6
Rob Lobel | 8

Semifinal
Michael Shepherd | 5
Dale Kelly | 7
Rob Lobel | 0
Scott Bailey | 7

Final
Dale Kelly | 4
Scott Bailey | 6

=== Challenge round ===
January 20–22, Midland Curling Club, Midland

New teams:

- Mark McDonald (Cataraqui)
- Mark Kean (Leaside)

Brackets:

A Side
Connor Duhaime | 7
Bryan Cochrane | 2
Mark McDonald | 5
Pat Ferris | 8
Jon St. Denis | 1
Jake Higgs | 7
Cory Heggestad | 4
Brent Ross | 3
Hugh Murphy | 9
Chris Gardner | 8
Gregory Park | 2
Colin Dow | 6
Mark Kean | 5
Sebastien Robillard | 7

Quarterfinals
Mike Harris | 8
Connor Duhaime | 6
Pat Ferris | 4
Jake Higgs | 6
Cory Heggestad | 6
Hugh Murphy | 5
Colin Dow | 3
Sebastien Robillard | 6

Semifinals
Mike Harris | 7
Jake Higgs | 1
Cory Heggestad | 3
Sebastien Robillard | 5

A Final
Mike Harris | 7
Sebastien Robillard | 0

B Side (Top half)
Brent Ross | 8
Chris Gardner | 3
Gregory Park | 3
Mark Kean | 7

Semifinals
Connor Duhaime | 6
Brent Ross | 9
Pat Ferris | 7
Mark Kean | 3

Finals
Brent Ross | 7
Pat Ferris | 4

| B Side (bottom half) | | Semifinal | | Finals |
| | | Hugh Murphy | 3 |
| | | Bryan Cochrane | 4 |
| | | | | Bryan Cochrane | 4 |
| Mark McDonald | 7 | | | Colin Dow | 7 |
| Jon St. Denis | 5 | Colin Dow | 6 |
| | | Mark McDonald | 4 |

| B Side | | Semifinal | | B Final |
| | | | | Cory Heggestad | 9 |
| Brent Ross | 5 | | | Sebastien Robillard | 5 |
| Cory Heggestad | 8 | Cory Heggestad | 7 |
| Colin Dow | 3 | Jake Higgs | 5 |
| Jake Higgs | 7 |
