= 2018 Ontario Tankard =

2018 Dairy Farmers of Ontario Tankard
- Host city: Huntsville, Ontario
- Arena: Canada Summit Centre
- Dates: January 31-February 4, 2018
- Winner: John Epping
- Curling club: Leaside Curling Club, East York, Toronto
- Skip: John Epping
- Third: Mathew Camm
- Second: Patrick Janssen
- Lead: Tim March
- Finalist: Glenn Howard

The 2018 Ontario Tankard, known as the Dairy Farmers of Ontario Tankard for sponsorship reasons, was the 2018 provincial men's curling championship for Southern Ontario, was held from January 31 to February 4 at the Canada Summit Centre in Huntsville, Ontario. The winning John Epping team represented Ontario at the 2018 Tim Hortons Brier in Regina, Saskatchewan.

The event had a triple knockout format, rather than the traditional round robin event as done in previous years. The number of qualified teams increased from 10 to 12.

== Qualification process ==
12 teams qualified from two regional qualifiers (three each), a challenge round (three teams), the winner of the Colts competition, plus the top two southern Ontario teams in the CTRS standings (as of December 10, 2017). The east and west 'provincial qualifiers' were preceded by four regional qualifiers in which three teams qualified for the provincial qualifiers, plus the teams ranked 3-10 on the CTRS standings.

Qualification method	Berths	Qualifying team
CTRS leaders	2	John Epping; Glenn Howard
East Qualifier	3	Greg Balsdon; Mark Kean; Michael McLean
West Qualifier	3	Mark Bice; Rob Retchless; Codey Maus
Challenge Round	3	Richard Krell; Joe Frans; Wayne Tuck Jr.
Colts Champion	1	Sebastien Robillard

== Teams ==
The team lineups are as follows:

Skip	Third	Second	Lead	Alternate	Club(s)
Greg Balsdon	Don Bowser	Jonathan Beuk	Scott Chadwick		Cataraqui Golf & Country Club, Kingston
Mark Bice	Aaron Squires	Tyler Morgan	Steve Bice		Sarnia Golf & Curling Club, Sarnia
John Epping	Mathew Camm	Patrick Janssen	Tim March		Leaside Curling Club, East York, Toronto
Joe Frans	Mike Anderson	Scott Foster	Sean Harrison		Oakville Curling Club, Oakville
Glenn Howard	Adam Spencer	David Mathers	Scott Howard		St. George's Golf & Curling Club, Etobicoke, Toronto
Mark Kean	Colin Dow	Brad Kidd	Scott Brandon		Woodstock Curling Club, Woodstock
Richard Krell	Evan Lilly	Jonah Mondloch	Robert Currie		Kitchener-Waterloo Granite Curling Club, Waterloo
Codey Maus	Scott McDonald	Wesley Forget	Jeff Grant		Highland Country Club, London
Michael McLean	Jason Camm	Kevin Lagerquist	Nathan Crawford		Navan Curling Club, Navan
Rob Retchless	Alex Champ	Terry Arnold	Scott Clinton		Royal Canadian Curling Club, Toronto
Sebastien Robillard	Ryan McCrady	Bowie Abbis-Mills	Andrew Denny-Petch		Ottawa Curling Club, Ottawa
Wayne Tuck Jr.	Chad Allen	Kurt Armstrong	Matt Pretty		Brant Curling Club, Brantford

== Knockout draw brackets ==
The draw is listed as follows:

=== A event ===
First Knockout
Wayne Tuck Jr.	3
Richard Krell	5
Rob Retchless	6
Mark Bice	10
Mark Kean	8
Michael McLean	6
Joe Frans	8
Sebastien Robillard	5

Quarterfinals
Richard Krell	3
John Epping	10
Mark Bice	11
Codey Maus	7
Mark Kean	10
Greg Balsdon	4
Joe Frans	1
Glenn Howard	5

Semifinals
John Epping	7
Mark Bice	5
Mark Kean	2
Glenn Howard	8

Qualifier 1
John Epping	6
Glenn Howard	10

=== B event ===
Second Knockout
Wayne Tuck Jr.	6
Codey Maus	10
Greg Balsdon	9
Sebastien Robillard	7
Joe Frans	8
Michael McLean	3
Richard Krell	6
Rob Retchless	4

Quarterfinals
Codey Maus	4
Mark Kean	7
Greg Balsdon	5
Mark Bice	7
Joe Frans	5
Richard Krell	3

Semifinals
Mark Kean	7
Mark Bice	6
Joe Frans	6
John Epping	9

Qualifier 2
Mark Kean	5
John Epping	8

=== C event ===
Third Knockout		Semifinals		Qualifier 3
		Sebastien Robillard	7
Wayne Tuck Jr.	2	Joe Frans	6
Sebastien Robillard	6			Sebastien Robillard	5
				Mark Bice	3
		Richard Krell	6
		Mark Bice	8

Third Knockout		Semifinals		Qualifier 4
Codey Maus	7
Michael McLean	2	Codey Maus	7
Greg Balsdon	7	Greg Balsdon	6
Rob Retchless	2			Codey Maus	7
				Mark Kean	5

== Scores ==
=== Draw 1 ===
January 31, 2:30pm

Team	1	2	3	4	5	6	7	8	9	10	Final
Rob Retchless	0	0	2	2	0	1	0	1	0	X	6
Mark Bice 🔨	2	1	0	0	2	0	1	0	4	X	10

Team	1	2	3	4	5	6	7	8	9	10	Final
Mark Kean 🔨	0	2	0	0	2	0	4	0	X	X	8
Michael McLean	1	0	1	2	0	1	0	1	X	X	6

Team	1	2	3	4	5	6	7	8	9	10	Final
Sebastien Robillard 🔨	0	2	0	0	0	0	1	0	2	0	5
Joe Frans	0	0	1	1	2	0	0	3	0	1	8

Team	1	2	3	4	5	6	7	8	9	10	Final
Richard Krell 🔨	0	2	0	0	1	0	0	2	0	X	5
Wayne Tuck Jr.	0	0	1	0	0	1	1	0	0	X	3

=== Draw 2 ===
January 31, 7:30pm

Team	1	2	3	4	5	6	7	8	9	10	Final
Mark Kean 🔨	0	2	0	4	0	0	4	X	X	X	10
Greg Balsdon	0	0	2	0	2	0	0	X	X	X	4

Team	1	2	3	4	5	6	7	8	9	10	Final
Joe Frans	0	0	0	0	0	0	1	0	X	X	1
Glenn Howard 🔨	1	1	0	1	1	0	0	1	X	X	5

Team	1	2	3	4	5	6	7	8	9	10	Final
Richard Krell 🔨	0	0	0	1	0	1	1	0	X	X	3
John Epping	1	1	1	0	4	0	0	3	X	X	10

Team	1	2	3	4	5	6	7	8	9	10	Final
Mark Bice	0	2	1	1	0	3	0	0	2	1	10
Codey Maus 🔨	2	0	0	0	2	0	2	1	0	0	7

=== Draw 3 ===
February 1, 9:30am

Team	1	2	3	4	5	6	7	8	9	10	Final
Codey Maus 🔨	3	0	2	0	3	0	1	0	1	X	10
Wayne Tuck Jr.	0	1	0	2	0	2	0	1	0	X	6

Team	1	2	3	4	5	6	7	8	9	10	Final
Sebastien Robillard	0	3	0	2	0	0	1	0	1	X	7
Greg Balsdon 🔨	2	0	3	0	1	1	0	2	0	X	9

Team	1	2	3	4	5	6	7	8	9	10	Final
Michael McLean	0	2	0	0	1	0	0	0	X	X	3
Joe Frans 🔨	2	0	2	1	0	0	2	1	X	X	8

Team	1	2	3	4	5	6	7	8	9	10	Final
Rob Retchless 🔨	0	0	0	1	0	0	1	0	2	0	4
Richard Krell	0	0	1	0	1	1	0	2	0	1	6

=== Draw 4 ===
February 1, 2:30pm

Team	1	2	3	4	5	6	7	8	9	10	Final
John Epping 🔨	0	1	0	1	0	3	1	1	0	X	7
Mark Bice	1	0	1	0	1	0	0	0	2	X	5

Team	1	2	3	4	5	6	7	8	9	10	Final
Sebastien Robillard	0	1	3	0	0	1	0	1	X	X	6
Wayne Tuck Jr. 🔨	1	0	0	0	0	0	1	0	X	X	2

Team	1	2	3	4	5	6	7	8	9	10	Final
Glenn Howard 🔨	0	3	2	0	3	X	X	X	X	X	8
Mark Kean	0	0	0	2	0	X	X	X	X	X	2

=== Draw 5 ===
February 1, 7:30pm

Team	1	2	3	4	5	6	7	8	9	10	Final
Joe Frans	0	0	1	0	0	0	1	2	1	0	5
Richard Krell 🔨	0	0	0	2	0	1	0	0	0	1	4

Team	1	2	3	4	5	6	7	8	9	10	Final
Mark Kean 🔨	0	1	0	2	1	0	0	2	1	X	7
Codey Maus	1	0	1	0	0	1	1	0	0	X	4

Team	1	2	3	4	5	6	7	8	9	10	Final
Glenn Howard 🔨	1	0	2	1	0	2	0	0	4	X	10
John Epping	0	3	0	0	1	0	2	0	0	X	6

Team	1	2	3	4	5	6	7	8	9	10	Final
Mark Bice 🔨	2	1	0	1	0	0	1	0	0	2	7
Greg Balsdon	0	0	1	0	1	1	0	1	1	0	5

=== Draw 6 ===
February 2, 9:30am

Team	1	2	3	4	5	6	7	8	9	10	Final
Michael McLean 🔨	0	0	1	0	0	1	0	0	X	X	2
Codey Maus	0	0	0	2	1	0	2	2	X	X	7

Team	1	2	3	4	5	6	7	8	9	10	Final
Rob Retchless 🔨	0	0	1	0	0	1	X	X	X	X	2
Greg Balsdon	2	2	0	1	2	0	X	X	X	X	7

Team	1	2	3	4	5	6	7	8	9	10	Final
Mark Kean 🔨	1	2	0	2	0	1	0	0	0	1	7
Mark Bice	0	0	1	0	2	0	2	1	0	0	6

Team	1	2	3	4	5	6	7	8	9	10	Final
Joe Frans 🔨	0	1	0	2	0	1	0	2	0	X	6
John Epping	1	0	2	0	3	0	1	0	2	X	9

=== Draw 7 ===
February 2, 2:30pm

Team	1	2	3	4	5	6	7	8	9	10	Final
Mark Kean 🔨	0	2	0	1	0	0	0	1	1	0	5
John Epping	0	0	2	0	0	3	1	0	0	2	8

Team	1	2	3	4	5	6	7	8	9	10	Final
Sebastien Robillard 🔨	2	3	0	1	0	0	1	0	0	X	7
Joe Frans	0	0	2	0	1	0	0	2	1	X	6

Team	1	2	3	4	5	6	7	8	9	10	Final
Richard Krell 🔨	0	1	3	0	1	0	0	1	0	0	6
Mark Bice	0	0	0	2	0	2	1	0	0	3	8

Team	1	2	3	4	5	6	7	8	9	10	Final
Codey Maus 🔨	0	0	1	0	1	0	1	3	0	1	7
Greg Balsdon	0	1	0	2	0	1	0	0	2	0	6

=== Draw 8 ===
February 2, 7:30pm

Team	1	2	3	4	5	6	7	8	9	10	Final
Sebastien Robillard	0	1	0	2	0	0	0	1	0	1	5
Mark Bice 🔨	0	0	1	0	0	0	1	0	1	0	3

Team	1	2	3	4	5	6	7	8	9	10	Final
Codey Maus 🔨	1	0	0	1	1	1	0	2	0	1	7
Mark Kean	0	1	1	0	0	0	1	0	2	0	5

== Playoffs ==
Page playoff system
A	Glenn Howard	8
B	John Epping	3
C1	Sebastien Robillard	6
C2	Codey Maus	11

Semifinal
B	John Epping	6
C2	Codey Maus	4

Final
A	Glenn Howard	1
B	John Epping	5

=== A vs. B ===
February 3, 1:00pm

Team	1	2	3	4	5	6	7	8	9	10	Final
Glenn Howard 🔨	2	0	1	0	0	2	0	3	X	X	8
John Epping	0	1	0	1	0	0	1	0	X	X	3

=== C1 vs. C2 ===
February 3, 6:30pm

Team	1	2	3	4	5	6	7	8	9	10	Final
Sebastien Robillard 🔨	1	0	3	0	0	0	2	0	X	X	6
Codey Maus	0	2	0	2	2	4	0	1	X	X	11

=== Semifinal ===
February 4, 9:30am

Team	1	2	3	4	5	6	7	8	9	10	Final
John Epping 🔨	2	0	0	1	0	2	0	1	0	X	6
Codey Maus	0	0	1	0	1	0	0	0	2	X	4

=== Final ===
February 4, 2:30pm

Team	1	2	3	4	5	6	7	8	9	10	Final
Glenn Howard 🔨	0	0	0	0	0	0	0	1	0	X	1
John Epping	0	0	0	0	0	0	2	0	3	X	5

2018 Ontario Tankard

John Epping
1st Ontario Provincial Championship title

== Qualification ==
The following teams have qualified for the east or west provincial qualifiers based on their ranking on the CTRS standings and will not have to play in the regional qualifiers:

- Greg Balsdon (Cataraqui)
- Codey Maus (Highland)
- Mark Kean (Woodstock)
- Wayne Tuck Jr. (Brant)
- Richard Krell (Kitchener-Waterloo Granite)
- Dayna Deruelle (Brampton)
- John Steski (RCMP)
- Steve Allen (Ottawa)

=== (Regional) qualifiers ===
==== Qualifier #1 ====
December 15–17, at the Renfrew Curling Club, Renfrew

Teams entered:

- Connor Duhaime (Cookstown)
- Willie Jeffries (Ottawa)
- Mike McLean (Navan)
- Spencer Richmond (Huntley)
- Joseph Smith (Quinte)

Brackets:

A event		Semifinal		**Final**
		Jeffries	4
Richmond	5	**Duhaime**	**10**
**Smith**	**6**			**Duhaime**	**6**
				Smith	5
		**Smith**	**10**
		McLean	8

B event		Semifinal		**Final**
Jeffries	4
**Richmond**	**8**	McLean	6
		**Richmond**	**7**
				**Richmond**	**8**
				Smith	3

C event		**Final**
Jeffries	2
**McLean**	**8**	Smith	3
		**McLean**	**10**

==== Qualifier #2 ====
December 15-17, at the Dixie Curling Club, Mississauga

Teams entered:

- Rob Ainsley (Royal Canadian)
- Roy Arndt (Dixie)
- Matt Glandfield (High Park)
- Rob Lobel (Thornhill)
- Dennis Moretto (Dixie)
- Gregory Park (Oshawa)
- Michael Shepherd (Richmond Hill)
- Brandon Tippin (Cookstown)

Brackets:

A1 event		**Final**
**Lobel**	**9**
Glandfield	3	**Lobel**	**11**
Ainsley	3	Shepherd	6
**Shepherd**	**8**

A2 event		**Final**
Park	4
**Tippin**	**7**	**Tippin**	**7**
Moretto	3	Arndt	3
**Arndt**	**7**

B1 event		**Final**
**Ainsley**	**11**
Glandfield	1	**Ainsley**	**7**
		Arndt	6

B2 event		**Final**
Park	3
**Moretto**	**7**	Moretto	5
		**Shepherd**	**7**

C event		**Final**
Park	2
**Arndt**	**8**	Arndt	2
Glandfield	3	**Moretto**	**7**
**Moretto**	**10**

==== Qualifier #3 ====
December 16–17

Teams entered:

- Mark Bice (Sarnia)
- Ryan Brown (North Halton)
- Ian Dickie (Mississaugua)
- Andrew Fairfull (Listowel)
- Pat Ferris (Grimsby)
- Joe Frans (Oakville)
- Brent Gray (Kitchener-Waterloo Granite)
- Nathan Martin (Oshawa)
- Rob Retchless (Royal Canadian)
- Brent Ross (Harriston)
- Daryl Shane (Listowel)
- Damien Villard (Galt)

Brackets:

A1 event		Semifinal		**Final**
		**Bice**	**7**
Shane	2	Villard	5
**Villard**	**8**			**Bice**	**7**
**Fairfull**	**13**			Dickie	5
Brown	1	**Dickie**	**6**
		Fairfull	5

A2 event		Semifinal		**Final**
		**Retchless**	**8**
Martin	3	Ferris	4
**Retchless**	**8**			**Retchless**	**6**
Gray	5			Ross	5
**Ross**	**6**	Frans	6
		**Ross**	**10**

B1 event		Semifinal		**Final**
**Fairfull**	**7**
Shane	6	Fairfull	4
Gray	6	**Ferris**	**6**
**Ferris**	**9**			Ferris
				Dickie

B2 event		Semifinal		**Final**
Martin	1
**Frans**	**6**	**Frans**	**8**
**Villard**	**7**	Villard	4
Brown	6			Ross	6
				**Frans**	**8**

C1 event		Semifinal		**Final**
		Fairfull	6
**Shane**	**6**	**Shane**	**7**
Martin	5			**Shane**	**7**
				Ross	5

C2 event		Semifinal		**Final**
		**Gray**	**9**
**Gray**	**11**	Villard	3
Brown	7			Gray	2
				**Ferris**	**9**

==== Qualifier #4 ====
Teams entered:

- Dale Kelly (Chatham Granite)
- Craig Van Ymeren (St. Thomas)

(No event necessary, both teams qualify for provincial qualifiers)

=== East qualifier ===
January 12-14 at the RCMP Curling Club, Ottawa

Brackets:

A Event
Rob Lobel	7
**Bandon Tippin**	**9**
**Michael McLean**	**7**
Dennis Moretto	2
Spencer Richmond	7
**Michael Shepherd**	**9**
Connor Duhaime	5
**Rob Ainsley**	**8**

Quarterfinals
Brandon Tippin	2
**Greg Balsdon**	**6**
John Steski	8
**Michael McLean**	**10**
**Dayna Deruelle**	**8**
Michael Shepherd	4
Rob Ainsley	8
**Mark Kean**	**10**

Semifinals
**Greg Balsdon**	**7**
Michael McLean	5
Dayna Deruelle	6
**Mark Kean**	**9**

Qualifier 1
**Greg Balsdon**	**8**
Mark Kean	1

B Event
**Rob Lobel**	**9**
John Steski	3
**Michael Shepherd**	**11**
Connor Duhaime	6
**Spencer Richmond**	**11**
Rob Ainsley	5
Dennis Moretto	3
**Brandon Tippin**	**11**

Quarterfinals
Rob Lobel	2
**Dayna Deruelle**	**7**
**Michael McLean**	**W**
Michael Shepherd	6
**Spencer Richmond**	**6**
Brandon Tippin	4

Semifinals
**Dayna Deruelle**	**6**
Michael McLean	3
Spencer Richmond	2
**Mark Kean**	**8**

Qualifier 2
Dayna Deruelle	5
**Mark Kean**	**9**

C Event
**Connor Duhaime**	**6**
John Steski	5
Rob Ainsley	5
**Rob Lobel**	**6**
Dennis Moretto	3
**Michael Shepherd**	**7**

Quarterfinals
**Spencer Richmond**	**8**
Connor Duhaime	6
Brandon Tippin	4
**Michael McLean**	**8**
Rob Lobel	7
**Michael Shepherd**	**8**

Semifinals
Spencer Richmond	5
**Michael McLean**	**8**
**Michael Shepherd**	**9**
Dayna Deruelle	4

Qualifier 3
**Michael McLean**	**9**
Michael Shepherd	3

=== West qualifier ===
January 12-14, Brant Curling Club, Brantford

Brackets:

A Event
**Rob Retchless**	**5**
Pat Ferris	4
Daryl Shane	3
**Mark Bice**	**7**
**Joe Frans**	**8**
Dale Kelly	5
Craig Van Ymeren	3
**Ian Dickie**	**8**

Quarterfinals
Codey Maus	4
**Rob Retchless**	**5**
**Mark Bice**	**9**
Steve Allen	6
**Joe Frans**	**7**
Richard Krell	6
Ian Dickie	6
**Wayne Tuck Jr.**	**7**

Semifinals
**Mark Bice**	**7**
Rob Retchless	4
Joe Frans	6
**Wayne Tuck Jr.**	**7**

Qualifier 1
**Mark Bice**	**8**
Wayne Tuck Jr.	2

B Event
**Pat Ferris**	**5**
Steve Allen	4
Craig Van Ymeren	0
**Richard Krell**	**6**
Dale Kelly	3
**Ian Dickie**	**8**
**Daryl Shane**	**7**
Codey Maus	3

Quarterfinals
**Joe Frans**	**7**
Pat Ferris	6
**Rob Retchless**	**7**
Richard Krell	3
Daryl Shane	5
**Ian Dickie**	**8**

Semifinals
Joe Frans	4
**Rob Retchless**	**7**
Ian Dickie	4
**Wayne Tuck Jr.**	**9**

Qualifier 2
**Rob Retchless**	**7**
Wayne Tuck Jr.	5

C Event
**Steve Allen**	**5**
Craig Van Ymeren	4
Dale Kelley	1
**Pat Ferris**	**10**
**Codey Maus**	**7**
Richard Krell	3

Quarterfinals
Ian Dickie	4
**Steve Allen**	**5**
Daryl Shane	4
**Joe Frans**	**9**
Pat Ferris	1
**Codey Maus**	**7**

Semifinals
**Joe Frans**	**8**
Steve Allen	2
**Codey Maus**	**9**
Wayne Tuck Jr.	4

Qualifier 3
Joe Frans	4
**Codey Maus**	**5**

=== Colts Championship ===
December 6-10 at the Midland Curling Club, Midland

Qualified teams:

- Andrew Fairfull (Listowel)
- Chris Van Huyse (Scarboro)
- Chris Wai (High Park)
- Ian Dickie (Mississaugua)
- John Young Jr. (Chatham Granite)
- Michael Shepherd (Richmond Hill)
- Sebastien Robillard (Ottawa)
- Terry Corbin (Brantford)

Standings

Team	W	L
Robillard	6	1
Van Huyse	6	1
Shepherd	5	2
Dickie	4	3
Fairfull	4	3
Corbin	1	6
Wai	1	6
Young	1	6

- Tie-breaker: **Robillard** 7-2 Van Huyse

==== Regional qualifiers ====
Qualifiers in bold. Two teams qualify from each event for the provincial Colts Championship.

===== Qualifier 1 =====
November 18, Gananoque Curling Club, Gananoque

Teams entered:

- Bill Sobering (Cornwall)
- Billy Woods (Dalhousie Lake)
- **Chris Wai** (High Park)
- **Sebastien Robillard** (Ottawa)

===== Qualifier 2 =====
Teams entered:

- Andrew Skelton (Guelph)
- **Chris Van Huyse** (Oshawa)
- Craig Schinde (Dixie)
- Derek Dobson (Richmond Hill)
- **Michael Shepherd** (Richmond Hill)
- Nathan Martin (Oshawa)
- Ryan O'Neil (Annandale)

===== Qualifier 3 =====
November 18-19, Penetanguishene Curling Club, Penetanguishene

Teams entered:

- **Andrew Fairfull** (Listowel)
- Darryl Hartman (North Halton)
- David Ellis (Leaside)
- Gregory Park (Oshawa)
- **Ian Dickie** (Oakville)
- Scott Jennings (Parry Sound)

===== Qualifier 4 =====
November 18-19, St. Marys Curling Club, St. Marys

Teams entered:

- Bill Buchanan (Welland)
- Dale Kelly (Chatham Granite)
- Derek Shackleton (St Marys)
- **John Young Jr.** (Chatham Granite)
- Jonathan Duguay (Oakville)
- **Terry Corbin** (Brantford)

=== Challenge round ===
January 19-21 at the Lindsay Curling Club, Lindsay

Triple knockout results:

New teams:

- Gary Grant (Lindsay)
- Mac Calwell (Navy)

Brackets:

A Side
Brandon Tippin	1
**Cory Heggestad**	**7**
**Steve Allen**	**6**
Spencer Richmond	0
**Gary Grant**	**8**
John Steski	5
Pat Ferris	3
**Mac Calwell**	**7**
**Daryl Shane**	**6**
Ian Dickie	4

Quarterfinals
Wayne Tuck Jr.	3
**Cory Heggestad**	**6**
Steve Allen	5
**Gary Grant**	**8**
**Richard Krell**	**6**
Mac Calwell	5
**Joe Frans**	**11**
Daryl Shane	3

Semifinals
Gary Grant	5
**Cory Heggestad**	**7**
Joe Frans	0
**Richard Krell**	**8**

**A Final**
Cory Heggestad	4
**Richard Krell**	**6**

B Side (Top half)
Pat Ferris	4
**John Steski**	**7**

Quarterfinals
Steve Allen	4
**John Steski**	**6**
Ian Dickie	5
**Wayne Tuck Jr.**	**8**

Semifinals
John Steski	3
**Wayne Tuck Jr.**	**8**

To B Semi-final
Wayne Tuck Jr.	7
**Joe Frans**	**8**

B Side (Bottom half)
Daryl Shane	6
**Brandon Tippin**	**8**
Mac Calwell	1
**Spencer Richmond**	**8**

Quarterfinals
Brandon Tippin	8
**Spencer Richmond**	**9**

Semifinals
**Spencer Richmond**	**8**
Gary Grant	4

B Semi-final
Spencer Richmond	1
**Joe Frans**	**7**
**B Final**
**Joe Frans**	**7**
Cory Heggestad	6

C Side (Top half)		Quarterfinals		Semifinals		To C Quarterfinal
				**John Steski**	**12**
				Mac Calwell	10
		Pat Ferris	7
**Pat Ferris**	**6**	**Mac Calwell**	**9**
Daryl Shane	3					**Gary Grant**	**8**
						John Steski	4

C Side (Bottom half)
Steve Allen	5
**Ian Dickie**	**7**

Quarterfinals
Brandon Tippin	5
**Ian Dickie**	**8**

Semifinals
**Wayne Tuck Jr.**	**8**
Ian Dickie	3

C Quarterfinal
Gary Grant	1
**Wayne Tuck Jr.**	**7**

C Semifinal		C Final
**Wayne Tuck Jr.**	**7**
Spencer Richmond	1	**Wayne Tuck Jr.**	**W**
		Cory Heggestad	L
