= 2019 Ontario Tankard =

2019 Ontario Men's Curling Championship
- Host city: Elmira, Ontario
- Arena: Woolwich Memorial Centre
- Dates: January 27–February 3
- Winner: Team McDonald
- Curling club: Cataraqui Golf & Country Club
- Skip: Scott McDonald
- Third: Jonathan Beuk
- Second: Wesley Forget
- Lead: Scott Chadwick
- Coach: Sean Turriff
- Finalist: John Epping

The 2019 Ontario Men's Curling Championship, better known as the Tankard, the 2019 provincial men's curling championship for Southern Ontario, was held from January 27 to February 3 at the Woolwich Memorial Centre in Elmira, Ontario. The winning Scott McDonald team would represent Ontario at the 2019 Tim Hortons Brier in Brandon, Manitoba. The event is being held in conjunction with the 2019 Ontario Scotties Tournament of Hearts, the provincial women's curling championship.

Unlike the 2018 event, the 2019 Tankard returned to having a round-robin format.

== Qualification Process ==
The original qualification process called for 10 teams to qualify from three cash spiels (two each), an open qualifier (two teams), plus the top two southern Ontario teams in the CTRS standings (as of December 9, 2018). However, CurlON announced on December 5, 2018, that a third CTRS team (Team Scott McDonald) would be allowed to directly qualify for the Tankard, as the team was in the top 10 in the CTRS standings at the time, and had a scheduling conflict preventing them from participating in the first round of cash spiel qualifiers (they were playing in the 2018 National). McDonald's direct entry took a qualifying spot away from Cash Spiel #2. This change in qualification was not without controversy.

Qualification method	Berths	Qualifying team
CTRS leaders	3	John Epping; Glenn Howard; Scott McDonald
Cash Spiel #1	2	Charley Thomas; Rob Retchless
Cash Spiel #2	1	Colin Dow
Cash Spiel #3	2	Greg Balsdon; Mark Bice
Open Qualifier	2	Dayna Deruelle; Pat Ferris

== Teams ==
The team lineups are as follows:

Skip	Third	Second	Lead	Alternate	Club(s)
Greg Balsdon	Chris Gardner	Brad Kidd	Andrew Denny-Petch		Royal Canadian Curling Club, Toronto
Mark Bice	Aaron Squires	Tyler Morgan	Codey Maus		Sarnia Golf and Curling Club, Sarnia
Dayna Deruelle	Brent Ross	Ryan Werenich	Shawn Kaufman	Shane Konings	Harriston Curling Club, Harriston
Colin Dow	Jordie Lyon-Hatcher	Brett Lyon-Hatcher	John Steski	R. J. Johnson	RCMP Curling Club, Ottawa
John Epping	Mathew Camm	Brent Laing	Craig Savill		Leaside Curling Club, East York, Toronto, Ontario
Pat Ferris	Connor Duhaime	Punit Sthankiya	Zander Elmes		Grimsby Curling Club, Grimsby
Glenn Howard	Scott Howard	David Mathers	Tim March		Penetanguishene Curling Club, Penetanguishene
Scott McDonald	Jonathan Beuk	Wesley Forget	Scott Chadwick		Cataraqui Golf & Country Club, Kingston
Rob Retchless	Alex Champ	Terry Arnold	Scott Clinton		Royal Canadian Curling Club, Toronto
Charley Thomas	Adam Casey	Patrick Janssen	Fraser Reid		Westmount Golf and Country Club, Kitchener

== Standings ==
Key
Teams to Playoffs

Skip (Club)	W	L	PF	PA	Ends Won	Ends Lost	Blank Ends	Stolen Ends
Scott McDonald (Cataraqui)	9	0	70	32	38	24	7	10
John Epping (Leaside)	7	2	63	42	38	28	8	12
Glenn Howard (Penetanguishene)	7	2	63	39	33	27	12	9
Charley Thomas (Westmount)	6	3	56	48	34	29	9	12
Greg Balsdon (Royals)	4	5	54	58	34	38	3	8
Dayna Deruelle (Harriston)	4	5	53	65	38	40	7	6
Pat Ferris (Grimsby)	3	6	50	61	35	41	8	10
Rob Retchless (Royals)	2	7	48	62	34	38	8	10
Colin Dow (RCMP)	2	7	48	65	32	39	2	6
Mark Bice (Sarnia)	1	8	35	64	24	36	4	7

== Round-robin results ==
=== Draw 1 ===
January 27, 7:00pm

Sheet A	1	2	3	4	5	6	7	8	9	10	Final
John Epping 🔨	0	0	0	2	0	1	0	0	0	X	3
Rob Retchless	1	0	1	0	2	0	0	1	2	X	7

Sheet B	1	2	3	4	5	6	7	8	9	10	Final
Colin Dow 🔨	0	1	0	1	0	1	0	0	X	X	3
Scott McDonald	1	0	1	0	2	0	2	1	X	X	7

Sheet C	1	2	3	4	5	6	7	8	9	10	Final
Dayna Deruelle 🔨	0	1	1	0	0	1	0	0	1	0	4
Glenn Howard	1	0	0	0	2	0	0	1	0	1	5

Sheet D	1	2	3	4	5	6	7	8	9	10	Final
Greg Balsdon 🔨	1	0	1	0	0	1	1	0	0	1	5
Pat Ferris	0	2	0	1	1	0	0	2	1	0	7

Sheet E	1	2	3	4	5	6	7	8	9	10	Final
Mark Bice 🔨	1	0	1	0	0	0	X	X	X	X	2
Charley Thomas	0	1	0	2	4	2	X	X	X	X	9

=== Draw 2 ===
January 28, 9:00am

Sheet A	1	2	3	4	5	6	7	8	9	10	Final
Scott McDonald 🔨	2	2	0	0	2	0	3	X	X	X	9
Charley Thomas	0	0	0	1	0	2	0	X	X	X	3

Sheet B	1	2	3	4	5	6	7	8	9	10	Final
John Epping	0	1	0	2	3	0	2	0	1	X	9
Dayna Deruelle 🔨	2	0	0	0	0	2	0	1	0	X	5

Sheet C	1	2	3	4	5	6	7	8	9	10	Final
Rob Retchless	0	1	0	0	0	1	X	X	X	X	2
Greg Balsdon 🔨	2	0	2	2	1	0	X	X	X	X	7

Sheet D	1	2	3	4	5	6	7	8	9	10	Final
Colin Dow 🔨	0	1	0	3	1	0	4	1	X	X	10
Mark Bice	1	0	2	0	0	1	0	0	X	X	4

Sheet E	1	2	3	4	5	6	7	8	9	10	11	Final
Glenn Howard	1	1	0	0	3	1	0	2	0	0	1	9
Pat Ferris 🔨	0	0	2	1	0	0	3	0	1	1	0	8

=== Draw 3 ===
January 28, 4:00pm

Sheet A	1	2	3	4	5	6	7	8	9	10	Final
Colin Dow	0	0	0	1	0	X	X	X	X	X	1
Glenn Howard 🔨	3	1	3	0	1	X	X	X	X	X	8

Sheet B	1	2	3	4	5	6	7	8	9	10	Final
Greg Balsdon 🔨	2	0	1	0	0	0	3	1	X	X	7
Mark Bice	0	1	0	0	2	1	0	0	X	X	4

Sheet C	1	2	3	4	5	6	7	8	9	10	Final
John Epping	1	0	1	0	2	2	0	0	1	X	7
Pat Ferris 🔨	0	1	0	1	0	0	0	1	0	X	3

Sheet D	1	2	3	4	5	6	7	8	9	10	Final
Dayna Deruelle	0	1	0	1	0	0	0	0	X	X	2
Charley Thomas 🔨	1	0	3	0	0	1	1	1	X	X	7

Sheet E	1	2	3	4	5	6	7	8	9	10	Final
Rob Retchless	0	1	0	3	0	0	0	1	0	X	5
Scott McDonald 🔨	1	0	1	0	1	2	2	0	1	X	8

=== Draw 6 ===
January 29, 2:30pm

Sheet A	1	2	3	4	5	6	7	8	9	10	11	Final
John Epping	0	1	1	1	0	0	0	2	1	0	1	7
Greg Balsdon 🔨	1	0	0	0	1	0	3	0	0	1	0	6

Sheet B	1	2	3	4	5	6	7	8	9	10	Final
Scott McDonald	0	3	0	0	2	0	0	2	0	X	7
Glenn Howard 🔨	2	0	0	1	0	2	0	0	0	X	5

Sheet C	1	2	3	4	5	6	7	8	9	10	Final
Colin Dow 🔨	0	1	0	1	0	0	0	0	X	X	2
Charley Thomas	0	0	2	0	1	1	1	2	X	X	7

Sheet D	1	2	3	4	5	6	7	8	9	10	Final
Rob Retchless 🔨	3	1	0	2	0	0	0	2	0	0	8
Pat Ferris	0	0	2	0	1	0	1	0	3	2	9

Sheet E	1	2	3	4	5	6	7	8	9	10	11	Final
Dayna Deruelle 🔨	0	2	1	1	0	1	0	2	0	0	1	8
Mark Bice	0	0	0	0	3	0	3	0	0	1	0	7

=== Draw 7 ===
January 29, 7:30pm

Sheet C	1	2	3	4	5	6	7	8	9	10	Final
Scott McDonald 🔨	2	2	0	1	0	3	X	X	X	X	8
Mark Bice	0	0	1	0	1	0	X	X	X	X	2

Sheet D	1	2	3	4	5	6	7	8	9	10	Final
John Epping 🔨	2	0	0	1	0	4	0	2	X	X	9
Colin Dow	0	2	0	0	1	0	2	0	X	X	5

Sheet E	1	2	3	4	5	6	7	8	9	10	Final
Glenn Howard 🔨	2	0	3	4	X	X	X	X	X	X	9
Greg Balsdon	0	1	0	0	X	X	X	X	X	X	1

=== Draw 8 ===
January 30, 9:30am

Sheet A	1	2	3	4	5	6	7	8	9	10	11	Final
Rob Retchless	1	0	2	0	0	1	0	2	0	1	0	7
Dayna Deruelle 🔨	0	2	0	2	2	0	1	0	0	0	1	8

Sheet B	1	2	3	4	5	6	7	8	9	10	Final
Pat Ferris	0	2	0	0	1	0	0	2	0	0	5
Charley Thomas 🔨	1	0	2	1	0	1	0	0	0	1	6

=== Draw 9 ===
January 30, 2:30pm

Sheet A	1	2	3	4	5	6	7	8	9	10	Final
Pat Ferris 🔨	0	1	0	1	0	0	0	1	1	1	5
Mark Bice	1	0	2	0	0	0	1	0	0	0	4

Sheet B	1	2	3	4	5	6	7	8	9	10	Final
Rob Retchless	0	0	1	1	1	0	0	0	1	0	4
Glenn Howard 🔨	0	1	0	0	0	1	2	0	0	1	5

=== Draw 10 ===
January 30, 7:30pm

Sheet C	1	2	3	4	5	6	7	8	9	10	Final
Colin Dow 🔨	2	0	0	0	1	1	0	1	0	X	5
Greg Balsdon	0	2	2	2	0	0	2	0	1	X	9

Sheet D	1	2	3	4	5	6	7	8	9	10	Final
Scott McDonald 🔨	0	2	0	0	2	0	3	0	X	X	7
Dayna Deruelle	0	0	0	1	0	1	0	1	X	X	3

Sheet E	1	2	3	4	5	6	7	8	9	10	Final
John Epping 🔨	0	2	2	0	3	3	X	X	X	X	10
Charley Thomas	1	0	0	1	0	0	X	X	X	X	2

=== Draw 11 ===
January 31, 9:30am

Sheet A	1	2	3	4	5	6	7	8	9	10	Final
Scott McDonald 🔨	1	2	0	1	1	0	0	2	1	X	8
Greg Balsdon	0	0	2	0	0	2	0	0	0	X	4

Sheet B	1	2	3	4	5	6	7	8	9	10	Final
John Epping 🔨	3	0	1	1	2	X	X	X	X	X	7
Mark Bice	0	1	0	0	0	X	X	X	X	X	1

=== Draw 12 ===
January 31, 2:30pm

Sheet C	1	2	3	4	5	6	7	8	9	10	Final
Dayna Deruelle 🔨	1	3	0	1	0	1	0	1	0	2	9
Pat Ferris	0	0	1	0	1	0	1	0	3	0	6

Sheet D	1	2	3	4	5	6	7	8	9	10	Final
Glenn Howard 🔨	4	0	0	0	1	0	0	0	0	3	8
Charley Thomas	0	1	0	0	0	1	0	0	1	0	3

Sheet E	1	2	3	4	5	6	7	8	9	10	Final
Rob Retchless 🔨	4	0	1	0	2	0	1	0	0	1	9
Colin Dow	0	2	0	2	0	1	0	3	0	0	8

=== Draw 13 ===
January 31, 7:30pm

Sheet C	1	2	3	4	5	6	7	8	9	10	Final
John Epping 🔨	1	0	0	1	0	0	4	1	0	X	7
Glenn Howard	0	1	0	0	2	0	0	0	2	X	5

Sheet D	1	2	3	4	5	6	7	8	9	10	Final
Rob Retchless	0	1	0	0	0	0	0	X	X	X	1
Mark Bice 🔨	2	0	2	0	1	1	1	X	X	X	7

Sheet E	1	2	3	4	5	6	7	8	9	10	Final
Scott McDonald 🔨	2	0	3	0	0	0	3	X	X	X	8
Pat Ferris	0	0	0	1	2	0	0	X	X	X	3

=== Draw 14 ===
February 1, 9:30am

Sheet A	1	2	3	4	5	6	7	8	9	10	11	Final
Colin Dow 🔨	1	0	2	0	0	1	1	1	0	1	0	7
Dayna Deruelle	0	1	0	4	1	0	0	0	1	0	1	8

Sheet B	1	2	3	4	5	6	7	8	9	10	Final
Greg Balsdon 🔨	1	0	0	1	1	0	0	2	0	X	5
Charley Thomas	0	2	1	0	0	1	1	0	5	X	10

=== Draw 15 ===
February 1, 2:30pm

Sheet E	1	2	3	4	5	6	7	8	9	10	Final
Dayna Deruelle	0	1	0	2	0	2	0	1	0	X	6
Greg Balsdon 🔨	1	0	3	0	2	0	1	0	3	X	10

=== Draw 16 ===
February 1, 7:30pm

Sheet A	1	2	3	4	5	6	7	8	9	10	Final
Glenn Howard 🔨	0	0	2	3	0	4	X	X	X	X	9
Mark Bice	0	1	0	0	3	0	X	X	X	X	4

Sheet B	1	2	3	4	5	6	7	8	9	10	Final
Colin Dow 🔨	0	2	0	0	1	0	0	2	2	X	7
Pat Ferris	0	0	2	1	0	0	1	0	0	X	4

Sheet C	1	2	3	4	5	6	7	8	9	10	Final
Rob Retchless	0	1	1	1	0	1	0	1	X	X	5
Charley Thomas 🔨	3	0	0	0	4	0	2	0	X	X	9

Sheet D	1	2	3	4	5	6	7	8	9	10	Final
John Epping	0	1	0	1	0	1	0	1	X	X	4
Scott McDonald 🔨	1	0	3	0	3	0	1	0	X	X	8

== Playoffs ==
Page playoff system
1	Scott McDonald	7
2	John Epping	4
3	Glenn Howard	7
4	Charley Thomas	6

Semifinal
2	John Epping	8
3	Glenn Howard	6

Final
1	Scott McDonald	8
2	John Epping	2

=== 1 vs. 2 ===
February 2, 2:00pm

Sheet C	1	2	3	4	5	6	7	8	9	10	Final
Scott McDonald 🔨	0	4	0	0	1	1	0	0	1	X	7
John Epping	0	0	1	1	0	0	1	1	0	X	4

=== 3 vs. 4 ===
February 2, 2:00pm

Sheet D	1	2	3	4	5	6	7	8	9	10	11	Final
Glenn Howard 🔨	2	0	1	0	2	0	0	1	0	0	1	7
Charley Thomas	0	2	0	1	0	2	0	0	0	1	0	6

=== Semifinal ===
February 3, 9:30am

Sheet C	1	2	3	4	5	6	7	8	9	10	Final
John Epping 🔨	1	1	0	0	2	0	0	4	0	X	8
Glenn Howard	0	0	0	2	0	0	2	0	2	X	6

=== Final ===
February 3, 2:30pm

Sheet C	1	2	3	4	5	6	7	8	9	10	Final
Scott McDonald 🔨	2	2	0	2	0	2	X	X	X	X	8
John Epping	0	0	1	0	1	0	X	X	X	X	2

2019 Ontario Tankard

Scott McDonald
1st Ontario Provincial Championship title

== Qualification ==
=== Cash Spiel #1 ===
December 14–16, Acton Curling Club, Acton

Key
Teams to Playoffs
Teams to Tiebreakers

Pools A & B	W	L
Paul Moffatt (K-W Granite)	3	1
Joe Frans (St. Thomas)	3	1
Pat Ferris (Grimsby)	2	2
Charlie Richard (Highland)	2	2
John Willsey (K-W Granite)	2	2
Joey Hart (Whitby)	2	2
Dayna Deruelle (Harriston)	1	3
Brent Palmer (Burlington)	1	3

Pools C&D	W	L
Ian Dickie (Mississaugua)	5	0
Rob Retchless (Royals)	5	0
Charley Thomas (Westmount)	2	2
Rob Lobel (Thornhill)	2	2
Richard Krell (K-W Granite)	2	2
Rob Ainsley (Royals)	2	2
Dale Kelly (Beachgrove)	1	4
Gregory Park (Oshawa)	0	3
Wayne Tuck Jr. (Brantford)	0	4

Tiebreakers

- Lobel 6, Krell 3
- Richard 6, Willsey 4

Quarterfinals
Frans	6
Lobel	10
Thomas	9
Richard	3
Dickie	3
Ferris	4
Moffatt	3
Retchless	4

Semifinals
Lobel	2
Thomas	8
Ferris	3
Retchless	5

Final
Thomas	6
Retchless	1

=== Cash Spiel #2 ===
December 14–16, RCMP Curling Club, Ottawa

Team	W	L
Colin Dow (RCMP)	4	0
Greg Balsdon (Royals)	2	2
Steve Allen (Ottawa)	2	2
Dennis Elgie (Metcalfe)	1	3
Frank O'Driscoll (Rideau)	1	3

Playoff		Semifinal		Final
		Dow	5
O'Driscoll	4	O'Driscoll	4
Elgie	3			Dow	3
				Allen	2
		Allen	6
		Balsdon	2

=== Cash Spiel #3 ===
January 4–6, Leaside Curling Club, East York, Toronto

A1 Event
Mark Bice (Sarnia)	8
Sam Steep (St. Catharines)	1
Richard Krell (K-W Granite)	5
Paul Moffatt (K-W Granite)	4
Steve Allen (Ottawa)	6
Douglas Kee (Ottawa)	5
Frank O'Driscoll (Rideau)	1
Wayne Tuck Jr. (Brantford)	8

Semifinals
Mark Bice	4
Richard Krell	3
Steve Allen	7
Wayne Tuck Jr.	2

To playoffs
Mark Bice	3
Steve Allen	5

A2 Event
Ian Dickie (Mississaugua)	3
David Ellis (Leaside)	6
Pat Ferris (Grimsby)	7
Rob Ainsley (Royals)	5
Greg Balsdon (Royals)	7
Charlie Richard (Highland)	8
Michael Shepherd (Richmond Hill)	8
John Willsey (K-W Granite)	2

Semifinals
David Ellis	9
Pat Ferris	7
Charlie Richard	8
Michael Shepherd	6

To playoffs
David Ellis	8
Charlie Richard	5

B1 event
Sam Steep	4
Paul Moffatt	6
Douglas Kee	8
Frank O'Driscoll	3

Quarterfinals
Michael Shepherd	4
Paul Moffatt	6
Pat Ferris	7
Douglas Kee	3

Semifinals
Paul Moffatt	2
Pat Ferris	7

To playoffs
Pat Ferris	3
Mark Bice	5

B2 event
Ian Dickie	7
Rob Ainsley	4
Greg Balsdon	7
John Willsey	4

Quarterfinals
Wayne Tuck Jr.	6
Ian Dickie	2
Richard Krell	2
Greg Balsdon	5

Semifinals
Wayne Tuck Jr.	2
Greg Balsdon	4

To playoffs
Greg Balsdon	6
Charlie Richard	5

C1 event		Quarterfinals		Semifinals		To playoffs
				Wayne Tuck Jr.	5
Sam Steep	1			Richard Krell	7
Richard Krell	8	Richard Krell	7
Frank O'Driscoll	8	Ian Dickie	1
Ian Dickie	9					Pat Ferris	6
						Richard Krell	0

C2 event		Quarterfinals		Semifinals		To playoffs
				Paul Moffatt	5
Rob Ainsley	8			John Willsey	9
Douglas Kee	1	Rob Ainsley	2
John Willsey	6	John Willsey	9
Michael Shepherd	5					Charlie Richard	6
						John Willsey	5

Playoff 1		To Provincials
Greg Balsdon	7
Pat Ferris	4	Steve Allen	3
		Greg Balsdon	5

Playoff 2		To Provincials
Mark Bice	5
Charlie Richard	4	David Ellis	3
		Mark Bice	8

=== Open Qualifier ===
January 11–13, Penetanguishene Curling Club, Penetanguishene

A event
Cory Heggestad (Stroud)	8
Damien Villard (Galt)	3
Ian Dickie (Mississaugua)	9
Douglas Kee (Ottawa)	1
Pat Ferris (Grimsby)	15
Jordan Thin (Welland)	6
Joe Frans (St. Thomas)	7
Dale Kelly (Beachgrove)	1
Dayna Deruelle (Harriston)	10
Rob Ainsley (Royals)	4

Quarterfinals
John Willsey (K-W Granite)	10
Cory Heggestad	6
Ian Dickie	6
Wayne Tuck Jr. (Brantford)	8
Joe Frans	5
Pat Ferris	6
Dayna Deruelle	8
Steve Allen (Ottawa)	0

Semifinals
John Willsey	8
Wayne Tuck Jr.	6
Pat Ferris	5
Dayna Deruelle	6

Finals
John Willsey	4
Dayna Deruelle	5

B event (top half)
Jordan Thin	4
Dale Kelly	6

Quarterfinals
Cory Heggestad	8
Dale Kelly	6
Ian Dickie	5
Rob Ainsley	6

Semifinals
Cory Heggestad	7
Rob Ainsley	8

To B semifinal
Pat Ferris	8
Rob Ainsley	3

B event (bottom half)		Semifinals		To B semifinal
				Wayne Tuck Jr.	5
Damien Villard	6			Steve Allen	6
Joe Frans	5	Damien Villard	5
Douglas Kee	5	Steve Allen	10
Steve Allen	11

B Semifinal		B Final
		John Willsey	6
Pat Ferris	9	Pat Ferris	7
Steve Allen	5
