= 2015 Ontario Tankard =

2015 Recharge With Milk Tankard
- Host city: Dorchester, Ontario
- Arena: Dorchester Flight Exec Centre
- Dates: February 2–8
- Winner: Mark Kean
- Curling club: Fenelon Falls CC, Fenelon Falls
- Skip: Mark Kean
- Third: Mathew Camm
- Second: David Mathers
- Lead: Scott Howard
- Alternate: Bryan Cochrane
- Finalist: John Epping

The 2015 Ontario Tankard, the Southern Ontario men's provincial curling championship, was held from February 2 to 8 at the Dorchester Flight Exec Centre in Dorchester, Ontario. The winning Mark Kean rink represented Ontario at the 2015 Tim Hortons Brier in Calgary, Alberta.

== Teams ==
| Skip | Third | Second | Lead | Alternate | Club(s) |
|---|---|---|---|---|---|
| Greg Balsdon | Mark Bice | Tyler Morgan | Steve Bice | Jamie Farnell | Glendale Golf & Country Club, Hamilton |
| Colin Dow | Ritchie Gillan | Brett Lyon-Hatcher | John Steski | | Huntley Curling Club, Carp, Ottawa |
| John Epping | Travis Fanset | Patrick Janssen | Tim March | | Annandale Country Club, Ajax |
| Joe Frans | Craig Van Ymeren | Bowie Abbis-Mills | Jeff Gorda | | St. Thomas Curling Club, St. Thomas |
| Cory Heggestad | Dylan Tippin | Simon Barrick | Brandon Tippin | | Markdale Golf & Curling Club, Markdale |
| Mark Kean | Mathew Camm | David Mathers | Scott Howard | Bryan Cochrane | Fenelon Falls Curling Club, Fenelon Falls |
| Ian MacAulay | Steve Allen | Rick Allen | Barry Conrad | | R.C.M.P. Curling Club, Ottawa |
| Peter Corner | Graeme McCarrel | Codey Maus | Craig Kochan | Wayne Middaugh | St. George's Golf & Country Club, Etobicoke, Toronto |
| Robert Rumfeldt | Adam Spencer | Brad Kidd | Jake Higgs | | Guelph Curling Club, Guelph |
| Aaron Squires | Matt Mapletoft | Spener Nuttall | Fraser Reid | | Kitchener-Waterloo Granite Club, Waterloo |
| Jon St. Denis | Chris Ciasnocha | Mike Aprile | Shawn Cottrill | | Listowel Curling Club, Listowel |

== Round-robin standings ==
Final round-robin standings

Key
| Teams to Playoffs |
| Teams to Tiebreaker |

| Skip (Club) | W | L | PF | PA | Ends Won | Ends Lost | Blank Ends | Stolen Ends |
|---|---|---|---|---|---|---|---|---|
| Mark Kean (Fenelon Falls) | 8 | 2 | 79 | 47 | 43 | 35 | 4 | 12 |
| John Epping (Annandale) | 8 | 2 | 63 | 51 | 45 | 38 | 9 | 18 |
| Ian MacAulay (RCMP) | 6 | 4 | 67 | 58 | 43 | 39 | 7 | 13 |
| Greg Balsdon (Glendale) | 6 | 4 | 61 | 53 | 40 | 33 | 10 | 12 |
| Colin Dow (Huntley) | 6 | 4 | 69 | 57 | 41 | 38 | 6 | 15 |
| Peter Corner (St. George's) | 6 | 4 | 55 | 58 | 34 | 35 | 18 | 6 |
| Joe Frans (St. Thomas) | 4 | 6 | 58 | 64 | 38 | 42 | 10 | 7 |
| Robert Rumfeldt (Guelph ) | 4 | 6 | 60 | 56 | 37 | 38 | 16 | 6 |
| Aaron Squires (Kitchener-Waterloo Granite) | 3 | 7 | 62 | 81 | 42 | 44 | 3 | 10 |
| Jon St. Denis (Listowel) | 3 | 7 | 48 | 70 | 34 | 45 | 10 | 9 |
| Cory Heggestad (Markdale) | 1 | 9 | 56 | 85 | 37 | 46 | 11 | 5 |

== Results ==
=== Draw 1 ===
Monday, February 2, 2:00 pm

| Sheet 1 | 1 | 2 | 3 | 4 | 5 | 6 | 7 | 8 | 9 | 10 | Final |
|---|---|---|---|---|---|---|---|---|---|---|---|
| Aaron Squires 🔨 | 1 | 0 | 1 | 0 | 3 | 0 | 1 | 1 | 1 | X | 8 |
| Joe Frans | 0 | 1 | 0 | 2 | 0 | 2 | 0 | 0 | 0 | X | 5 |

| Sheet 2 | 1 | 2 | 3 | 4 | 5 | 6 | 7 | 8 | 9 | 10 | Final |
|---|---|---|---|---|---|---|---|---|---|---|---|
| Robert Rumfeldt 🔨 | 1 | 0 | 0 | 1 | 0 | 3 | 0 | 3 | 0 | 1 | 9 |
| Cory Heggestad | 0 | 0 | 1 | 0 | 2 | 0 | 3 | 0 | 1 | 0 | 7 |

| Sheet 3 | 1 | 2 | 3 | 4 | 5 | 6 | 7 | 8 | 9 | 10 | Final |
|---|---|---|---|---|---|---|---|---|---|---|---|
| Jon St. Denis 🔨 | 3 | 0 | 0 | 1 | 0 | 0 | 0 | 0 | 0 | X | 4 |
| John Epping | 0 | 0 | 1 | 0 | 2 | 2 | 1 | 1 | 1 | X | 8 |

| Sheet 4 | 1 | 2 | 3 | 4 | 5 | 6 | 7 | 8 | 9 | 10 | Final |
|---|---|---|---|---|---|---|---|---|---|---|---|
| Ian MacAulay | 0 | 1 | 0 | 2 | 0 | 0 | 2 | 0 | 1 | X | 6 |
| Peter Corner 🔨 | 1 | 0 | 1 | 0 | 2 | 1 | 0 | 2 | 0 | X | 7 |

| Sheet 5 | 1 | 2 | 3 | 4 | 5 | 6 | 7 | 8 | 9 | 10 | Final |
|---|---|---|---|---|---|---|---|---|---|---|---|
| Colin Dow | 0 | 1 | 0 | 0 | 1 | 1 | 0 | X | X | X | 3 |
| Mark Kean 🔨 | 2 | 0 | 2 | 1 | 0 | 0 | 3 | X | X | X | 8 |

=== Draw 2 ===
Monday, February 2, 7:30pm

| Sheet 1 | 1 | 2 | 3 | 4 | 5 | 6 | 7 | 8 | 9 | 10 | Final |
|---|---|---|---|---|---|---|---|---|---|---|---|
| John Epping 🔨 | 0 | 3 | 0 | 1 | 0 | 1 | 0 | 2 | 1 | X | 8 |
| Peter Corner | 1 | 0 | 1 | 0 | 1 | 0 | 1 | 0 | 0 | X | 4 |

| Sheet 2 | 1 | 2 | 3 | 4 | 5 | 6 | 7 | 8 | 9 | 10 | Final |
|---|---|---|---|---|---|---|---|---|---|---|---|
| Colin Dow 🔨 | 1 | 0 | 1 | 0 | 2 | 0 | 1 | 0 | 0 | 3 | 8 |
| Robert Rumfeldt | 0 | 1 | 0 | 1 | 0 | 3 | 0 | 1 | 1 | 0 | 7 |

| Sheet 3 | 1 | 2 | 3 | 4 | 5 | 6 | 7 | 8 | 9 | 10 | Final |
|---|---|---|---|---|---|---|---|---|---|---|---|
| Joe Frans 🔨 | 2 | 0 | 0 | 1 | 0 | 0 | 0 | X | X | X | 3 |
| Mark Kean | 0 | 2 | 1 | 0 | 1 | 2 | 3 | X | X | X | 9 |

| Sheet 4 | 1 | 2 | 3 | 4 | 5 | 6 | 7 | 8 | 9 | 10 | Final |
|---|---|---|---|---|---|---|---|---|---|---|---|
| Aaron Squires | 0 | 2 | 0 | 2 | 0 | 1 | 0 | 1 | 0 | X | 6 |
| Greg Balsdon 🔨 | 2 | 0 | 1 | 0 | 1 | 0 | 2 | 0 | 2 | X | 8 |

| Sheet 5 | 1 | 2 | 3 | 4 | 5 | 6 | 7 | 8 | 9 | 10 | Final |
|---|---|---|---|---|---|---|---|---|---|---|---|
| Jon St. Denis | 2 | 0 | 0 | 2 | 0 | 3 | 2 | X | X | X | 9 |
| Cory Heggestad 🔨 | 0 | 1 | 0 | 0 | 1 | 0 | 0 | X | X | X | 2 |

=== Draw 3 ===
Tuesday, February 3, 2:00 pm

| Sheet 1 | 1 | 2 | 3 | 4 | 5 | 6 | 7 | 8 | 9 | 10 | Final |
|---|---|---|---|---|---|---|---|---|---|---|---|
| Mark Kean 🔨 | 0 | 2 | 1 | 0 | 3 | 0 | 3 | X | X | X | 9 |
| Greg Balsdon | 1 | 0 | 0 | 1 | 0 | 1 | 0 | X | X | X | 3 |

| Sheet 2 | 1 | 2 | 3 | 4 | 5 | 6 | 7 | 8 | 9 | 10 | Final |
|---|---|---|---|---|---|---|---|---|---|---|---|
| Jon St. Denis 🔨 | 0 | 0 | 0 | 0 | 2 | 0 | X | X | X | X | 2 |
| Colin Dow | 1 | 1 | 1 | 1 | 0 | 6 | X | X | X | X | 10 |

| Sheet 3 | 1 | 2 | 3 | 4 | 5 | 6 | 7 | 8 | 9 | 10 | Final |
|---|---|---|---|---|---|---|---|---|---|---|---|
| Peter Corner | 1 | 0 | 1 | 0 | 3 | 0 | 1 | 0 | 1 | 5 | 12 |
| Cory Heggestad 🔨 | 0 | 1 | 0 | 2 | 0 | 0 | 0 | 3 | 0 | 0 | 6 |

| Sheet 4 | 1 | 2 | 3 | 4 | 5 | 6 | 7 | 8 | 9 | 10 | Final |
|---|---|---|---|---|---|---|---|---|---|---|---|
| John Epping | 1 | 0 | 0 | 0 | 1 | 1 | 0 | 1 | 0 | X | 4 |
| Ian MacAulay 🔨 | 0 | 2 | 2 | 1 | 0 | 0 | 2 | 0 | 1 | X | 8 |

| Sheet 5 | 1 | 2 | 3 | 4 | 5 | 6 | 7 | 8 | 9 | 10 | 11 | Final |
|---|---|---|---|---|---|---|---|---|---|---|---|---|
| Joe Frans 🔨 | 1 | 0 | 2 | 0 | 1 | 0 | 3 | 0 | 1 | 0 | 1 | 9 |
| Robert Rumfeldt | 0 | 1 | 0 | 1 | 0 | 3 | 0 | 1 | 0 | 2 | 0 | 8 |

=== Draw 4 ===
Tuesday February 3, 7:00 pm

| Sheet 1 | 1 | 2 | 3 | 4 | 5 | 6 | 7 | 8 | 9 | 10 | Final |
|---|---|---|---|---|---|---|---|---|---|---|---|
| Cory Heggestad 🔨 | 0 | 3 | 0 | 0 | 1 | 0 | 0 | 1 | 0 | 0 | 5 |
| Ian MacAulay | 0 | 0 | 0 | 2 | 0 | 2 | 2 | 0 | 0 | 1 | 7 |

| Sheet 2 | 1 | 2 | 3 | 4 | 5 | 6 | 7 | 8 | 9 | 10 | Final |
|---|---|---|---|---|---|---|---|---|---|---|---|
| Joe Frans 🔨 | 2 | 2 | 0 | 0 | 0 | 2 | 1 | 0 | 1 | X | 8 |
| Jon St. Denis | 0 | 0 | 2 | 0 | 0 | 0 | 0 | 1 | 0 | X | 3 |

| Sheet 3 | 1 | 2 | 3 | 4 | 5 | 6 | 7 | 8 | 9 | 10 | Final |
|---|---|---|---|---|---|---|---|---|---|---|---|
| Greg Balsdon | 0 | 0 | 0 | 1 | 3 | 0 | 2 | 0 | 1 | X | 7 |
| Robert Rumfeldt 🔨 | 0 | 1 | 0 | 0 | 0 | 0 | 0 | 2 | 0 | X | 3 |

| Sheet 4 | 1 | 2 | 3 | 4 | 5 | 6 | 7 | 8 | 9 | 10 | Final |
|---|---|---|---|---|---|---|---|---|---|---|---|
| Mark Kean | 0 | 2 | 0 | 2 | 2 | 3 | 0 | X | X | X | 9 |
| Aaron Squires 🔨 | 2 | 0 | 1 | 0 | 0 | 0 | 1 | X | X | X | 4 |

| Sheet 5 | 1 | 2 | 3 | 4 | 5 | 6 | 7 | 8 | 9 | 10 | Final |
|---|---|---|---|---|---|---|---|---|---|---|---|
| Peter Corner 🔨 | 0 | 0 | 0 | 1 | 0 | 2 | 0 | 0 | X | X | 3 |
| Colin Dow | 0 | 1 | 1 | 0 | 2 | 0 | 3 | 1 | X | X | 8 |

=== Draw 5 ===
Wednesday, February 4, 9:00 am

| Sheet 1 | 1 | 2 | 3 | 4 | 5 | 6 | 7 | 8 | 9 | 10 | Final |
|---|---|---|---|---|---|---|---|---|---|---|---|
| Robert Rumfeldt | 1 | 0 | 1 | 2 | 0 | 3 | 0 | 3 | X | X | 10 |
| Aaron Squires 🔨 | 0 | 1 | 0 | 0 | 1 | 0 | 2 | 0 | X | X | 4 |

| Sheet 2 | 1 | 2 | 3 | 4 | 5 | 6 | 7 | 8 | 9 | 10 | 11 | Final |
|---|---|---|---|---|---|---|---|---|---|---|---|---|
| Peter Corner 🔨 | 2 | 0 | 2 | 0 | 2 | 0 | 0 | 0 | 0 | 0 | 1 | 7 |
| Joe Frans | 0 | 1 | 0 | 1 | 0 | 2 | 0 | 0 | 1 | 1 | 0 | 6 |

| Sheet 3 | 1 | 2 | 3 | 4 | 5 | 6 | 7 | 8 | 9 | 10 | Final |
|---|---|---|---|---|---|---|---|---|---|---|---|
| Ian MacAulay 🔨 | 2 | 0 | 1 | 2 | 0 | 4 | X | X | X | X | 9 |
| Colin Dow | 0 | 2 | 0 | 0 | 1 | 0 | X | X | X | X | 3 |

| Sheet 4 | 1 | 2 | 3 | 4 | 5 | 6 | 7 | 8 | 9 | 10 | Final |
|---|---|---|---|---|---|---|---|---|---|---|---|
| Cory Heggestad 🔨 | 2 | 0 | 0 | 0 | 0 | 2 | 0 | 1 | 0 | 1 | 6 |
| John Epping | 0 | 1 | 1 | 0 | 1 | 0 | 2 | 0 | 2 | 0 | 7 |

| Sheet 5 | 1 | 2 | 3 | 4 | 5 | 6 | 7 | 8 | 9 | 10 | Final |
|---|---|---|---|---|---|---|---|---|---|---|---|
| Greg Balsdon 🔨 | 2 | 0 | 1 | 0 | 1 | 0 | 1 | 0 | 0 | 1 | 6 |
| Jon St. Denis | 0 | 1 | 0 | 0 | 0 | 1 | 0 | 1 | 1 | 0 | 4 |

=== Draw 6 ===
Wednesday, February 4, 2:00 pm

| Sheet 1 | 1 | 2 | 3 | 4 | 5 | 6 | 7 | 8 | 9 | 10 | 11 | Final |
|---|---|---|---|---|---|---|---|---|---|---|---|---|
| Colin Dow | 0 | 0 | 2 | 1 | 1 | 0 | 2 | 0 | 1 | 0 | 0 | 7 |
| John Epping 🔨 | 3 | 2 | 0 | 0 | 0 | 1 | 0 | 0 | 0 | 1 | 1 | 8 |

| Sheet 2 | 1 | 2 | 3 | 4 | 5 | 6 | 7 | 8 | 9 | 10 | Final |
|---|---|---|---|---|---|---|---|---|---|---|---|
| Greg Balsdon | 0 | 0 | 2 | 1 | 1 | 3 | X | X | X | X | 7 |
| Peter Corner 🔨 | 0 | 0 | 0 | 0 | 0 | 0 | X | X | X | X | 0 |

| Sheet 3 | 1 | 2 | 3 | 4 | 5 | 6 | 7 | 8 | 9 | 10 | 11 | Final |
|---|---|---|---|---|---|---|---|---|---|---|---|---|
| Aaron Squires 🔨 | 0 | 0 | 2 | 1 | 0 | 1 | 0 | 1 | 1 | 0 | 2 | 8 |
| Jon St. Denis | 0 | 2 | 0 | 0 | 1 | 0 | 1 | 0 | 0 | 2 | 0 | 6 |

| Sheet 4 | 1 | 2 | 3 | 4 | 5 | 6 | 7 | 8 | 9 | 10 | Final |
|---|---|---|---|---|---|---|---|---|---|---|---|
| Robert Rumfeldt 🔨 | 2 | 0 | 4 | 1 | 0 | 0 | 1 | 0 | 2 | X | 10 |
| Mark Kean | 0 | 1 | 0 | 0 | 2 | 1 | 0 | 1 | 0 | X | 5 |

| Sheet 5 | 1 | 2 | 3 | 4 | 5 | 6 | 7 | 8 | 9 | 10 | Final |
|---|---|---|---|---|---|---|---|---|---|---|---|
| Ian MacAulay | 1 | 0 | 0 | 2 | 1 | 0 | 1 | 0 | 0 | X | 5 |
| Joe Frans 🔨 | 0 | 1 | 1 | 0 | 0 | 4 | 0 | 1 | 1 | X | 8 |

=== Draw 7 ===
Wednesday, February 4, 7:00 pm

| Sheet 1 | 1 | 2 | 3 | 4 | 5 | 6 | 7 | 8 | 9 | 10 | Final |
|---|---|---|---|---|---|---|---|---|---|---|---|
| Jon St. Denis 🔨 | 3 | 1 | 0 | 2 | 0 | 1 | 0 | 1 | 0 | 1 | 9 |
| Mark Kean | 0 | 0 | 2 | 0 | 2 | 0 | 2 | 0 | 2 | 0 | 8 |

| Sheet 2 | 1 | 2 | 3 | 4 | 5 | 6 | 7 | 8 | 9 | 10 | Final |
|---|---|---|---|---|---|---|---|---|---|---|---|
| Ian MacAulay 🔨 | 3 | 0 | 0 | 2 | 2 | 1 | 0 | 1 | X | X | 9 |
| Greg Balsdon | 0 | 3 | 0 | 0 | 0 | 0 | 2 | 0 | X | X | 5 |

| Sheet 3 | 1 | 2 | 3 | 4 | 5 | 6 | 7 | 8 | 9 | 10 | Final |
|---|---|---|---|---|---|---|---|---|---|---|---|
| John Epping | 0 | 0 | 0 | 2 | 2 | 0 | 1 | 0 | 0 | 1 | 6 |
| Joe Frans 🔨 | 2 | 0 | 0 | 0 | 0 | 1 | 0 | 1 | 1 | 0 | 5 |

| Sheet 4 | 1 | 2 | 3 | 4 | 5 | 6 | 7 | 8 | 9 | 10 | Final |
|---|---|---|---|---|---|---|---|---|---|---|---|
| Colin Dow 🔨 | 0 | 0 | 2 | 0 | 3 | 0 | 0 | 1 | 4 | X | 10 |
| Cory Heggestad | 1 | 1 | 0 | 1 | 0 | 0 | 1 | 0 | 0 | X | 4 |

| Sheet 5 | 1 | 2 | 3 | 4 | 5 | 6 | 7 | 8 | 9 | 10 | Final |
|---|---|---|---|---|---|---|---|---|---|---|---|
| Aaron Squires | 0 | 2 | 0 | 1 | 0 | 0 | X | X | X | X | 3 |
| Peter Corner 🔨 | 2 | 0 | 2 | 0 | 3 | 2 | X | X | X | X | 9 |

=== Draw 8 ===
Thursday, February 5, 2:00 pm

| Sheet 1 | 1 | 2 | 3 | 4 | 5 | 6 | 7 | 8 | 9 | 10 | Final |
|---|---|---|---|---|---|---|---|---|---|---|---|
| Joe Frans 🔨 | 0 | 3 | 0 | 1 | 0 | 1 | 0 | 3 | 0 | X | 8 |
| Cory Heggestad | 2 | 0 | 1 | 0 | 1 | 0 | 1 | 0 | 0 | X | 5 |

| Sheet 2 | 1 | 2 | 3 | 4 | 5 | 6 | 7 | 8 | 9 | 10 | 11 | Final |
|---|---|---|---|---|---|---|---|---|---|---|---|---|
| Aaron Squires 🔨 | 2 | 2 | 2 | 0 | 1 | 0 | 0 | 1 | 0 | 0 | 0 | 8 |
| Ian MacAulay | 0 | 0 | 0 | 1 | 0 | 2 | 1 | 0 | 2 | 2 | 1 | 9 |

| Sheet 3 | 1 | 2 | 3 | 4 | 5 | 6 | 7 | 8 | 9 | 10 | Final |
|---|---|---|---|---|---|---|---|---|---|---|---|
| Mark Kean | 0 | 1 | 0 | 3 | 0 | 0 | 3 | 0 | 3 | X | 10 |
| Peter Corner 🔨 | 1 | 0 | 1 | 0 | 0 | 1 | 0 | 2 | 0 | X | 5 |

| Sheet 4 | 1 | 2 | 3 | 4 | 5 | 6 | 7 | 8 | 9 | 10 | Final |
|---|---|---|---|---|---|---|---|---|---|---|---|
| Jon St. Denis | 0 | 0 | 1 | 0 | 0 | 1 | 0 | X | X | X | 2 |
| Robert Rumfeldt 🔨 | 1 | 0 | 0 | 1 | 3 | 0 | 4 | X | X | X | 9 |

| Sheet 5 | 1 | 2 | 3 | 4 | 5 | 6 | 7 | 8 | 9 | 10 | Final |
|---|---|---|---|---|---|---|---|---|---|---|---|
| John Epping | 0 | 1 | 0 | 1 | 0 | 2 | 0 | 1 | 2 | X | 7 |
| Greg Balsdon 🔨 | 1 | 0 | 1 | 0 | 1 | 0 | 2 | 0 | 0 | X | 5 |

=== Draw 9 ===
Thursday, February 5, 7:00 pm

| Sheet 1 | 1 | 2 | 3 | 4 | 5 | 6 | 7 | 8 | 9 | 10 | Final |
|---|---|---|---|---|---|---|---|---|---|---|---|
| Peter Corner 🔨 | 0 | 0 | 0 | 0 | 0 | 0 | 0 | 0 | 0 | 2 | 2 |
| Robert Rumfeldt | 0 | 0 | 1 | 0 | 0 | 0 | 0 | 0 | 0 | 0 | 1 |

| Sheet 2 | 1 | 2 | 3 | 4 | 5 | 6 | 7 | 8 | 9 | 10 | Final |
|---|---|---|---|---|---|---|---|---|---|---|---|
| John Epping | 1 | 0 | 2 | 0 | 0 | 2 | 0 | 0 | 1 | X | 6 |
| Aaron Squires 🔨 | 0 | 1 | 0 | 1 | 1 | 0 | 0 | 0 | 0 | X | 3 |

| Sheet 3 | 1 | 2 | 3 | 4 | 5 | 6 | 7 | 8 | 9 | 10 | Final |
|---|---|---|---|---|---|---|---|---|---|---|---|
| Cory Heggestad 🔨 | 0 | 2 | 0 | 2 | 0 | 0 | 2 | 0 | 2 | X | 8 |
| Greg Balsdon | 0 | 0 | 1 | 0 | 2 | 1 | 0 | 1 | 0 | X | 5 |

| Sheet 4 | 1 | 2 | 3 | 4 | 5 | 6 | 7 | 8 | 9 | 10 | Final |
|---|---|---|---|---|---|---|---|---|---|---|---|
| Joe Frans | 0 | 0 | 2 | 0 | 0 | 0 | 0 | 1 | 0 | X | 3 |
| Colin Dow 🔨 | 0 | 1 | 0 | 1 | 1 | 1 | 0 | 0 | 1 | X | 5 |

| Sheet 5 | 1 | 2 | 3 | 4 | 5 | 6 | 7 | 8 | 9 | 10 | Final |
|---|---|---|---|---|---|---|---|---|---|---|---|
| Mark Kean 🔨 | 0 | 0 | 3 | 0 | 2 | 0 | 1 | 3 | X | X | 9 |
| Ian MacAulay | 0 | 1 | 0 | 1 | 0 | 1 | 0 | 0 | X | X | 3 |

=== Draw 10 ===
Friday, February 6, 2:00 pm

| Sheet 1 | 1 | 2 | 3 | 4 | 5 | 6 | 7 | 8 | 9 | 10 | Final |
|---|---|---|---|---|---|---|---|---|---|---|---|
| Greg Balsdon | 0 | 1 | 0 | 2 | 0 | 1 | 1 | 1 | 0 | 1 | 7 |
| Colin Dow 🔨 | 0 | 0 | 1 | 0 | 2 | 0 | 0 | 0 | 1 | 0 | 4 |

| Sheet 2 | 1 | 2 | 3 | 4 | 5 | 6 | 7 | 8 | 9 | 10 | Final |
|---|---|---|---|---|---|---|---|---|---|---|---|
| Mark Kean 🔨 | 2 | 0 | 1 | 0 | 1 | 0 | 1 | 1 | X | X | 6 |
| John Epping | 0 | 1 | 0 | 1 | 0 | 0 | 0 | 0 | X | X | 2 |

| Sheet 3 | 1 | 2 | 3 | 4 | 5 | 6 | 7 | 8 | 9 | 10 | Final |
|---|---|---|---|---|---|---|---|---|---|---|---|
| Robert Rumfeldt 🔨 | 0 | 0 | 1 | 0 | 0 | 1 | 0 | 1 | 0 | X | 3 |
| Ian MacAulay | 0 | 0 | 0 | 1 | 1 | 0 | 2 | 0 | 2 | X | 6 |

| Sheet 4 | 1 | 2 | 3 | 4 | 5 | 6 | 7 | 8 | 9 | 10 | Final |
|---|---|---|---|---|---|---|---|---|---|---|---|
| Peter Corner 🔨 | 0 | 2 | 0 | 0 | 0 | 0 | 1 | 2 | 0 | 1 | 6 |
| Jon St. Denis | 1 | 0 | 1 | 0 | 0 | 1 | 0 | 0 | 0 | 0 | 3 |

| Sheet 5 | 1 | 2 | 3 | 4 | 5 | 6 | 7 | 8 | 9 | 10 | Final |
|---|---|---|---|---|---|---|---|---|---|---|---|
| Cory Heggestad 🔨 | 0 | 2 | 2 | 0 | 1 | 1 | 0 | 2 | 0 | 0 | 8 |
| Aaron Squires | 3 | 0 | 0 | 3 | 0 | 0 | 1 | 0 | 2 | 3 | 12 |

=== Draw 11 ===
Friday, February 6, 7:00 pm

| Sheet 1 | 1 | 2 | 3 | 4 | 5 | 6 | 7 | 8 | 9 | 10 | Final |
|---|---|---|---|---|---|---|---|---|---|---|---|
| Ian MacAulay 🔨 | 0 | 1 | 0 | 2 | 0 | 0 | 1 | 0 | 1 | 0 | 5 |
| Jon St. Denis | 1 | 0 | 1 | 0 | 1 | 1 | 0 | 1 | 0 | 1 | 6 |

| Sheet 2 | 1 | 2 | 3 | 4 | 5 | 6 | 7 | 8 | 9 | 10 | Final |
|---|---|---|---|---|---|---|---|---|---|---|---|
| Cory Heggestad 🔨 | 1 | 0 | 1 | 0 | 2 | 0 | 0 | 0 | 1 | 0 | 5 |
| Mark Kean | 0 | 1 | 0 | 2 | 0 | 1 | 0 | 1 | 0 | 1 | 6 |

| Sheet 3 | 1 | 2 | 3 | 4 | 5 | 6 | 7 | 8 | 9 | 10 | Final |
|---|---|---|---|---|---|---|---|---|---|---|---|
| Colin Dow | 0 | 3 | 0 | 3 | 0 | 2 | 0 | 0 | 3 | X | 11 |
| Aaron Squires 🔨 | 1 | 0 | 1 | 0 | 2 | 0 | 1 | 1 | 0 | X | 6 |

| Sheet 4 | 1 | 2 | 3 | 4 | 5 | 6 | 7 | 8 | 9 | 10 | Final |
|---|---|---|---|---|---|---|---|---|---|---|---|
| Greg Balsdon 🔨 | 0 | 1 | 0 | 3 | 0 | 4 | X | X | X | X | 8 |
| Joe Frans | 0 | 0 | 1 | 0 | 2 | 0 | X | X | X | X | 3 |

| Sheet 5 | 1 | 2 | 3 | 4 | 5 | 6 | 7 | 8 | 9 | 10 | Final |
|---|---|---|---|---|---|---|---|---|---|---|---|
| Robert Rumfeldt 🔨 | 0 | 0 | 1 | 0 | 2 | 0 | 0 | 0 | X | X | 3 |
| John Epping | 1 | 0 | 0 | 2 | 0 | 2 | 1 | 1 | X | X | 7 |

== Tiebreakers ==
Saturday, February 7, 9:00 am

| Sheet 1 | 1 | 2 | 3 | 4 | 5 | 6 | 7 | 8 | 9 | 10 | Final |
|---|---|---|---|---|---|---|---|---|---|---|---|
| Ian MacAulay 🔨 | 1 | 1 | 0 | 0 | 0 | 0 | 1 | 0 | 2 | 0 | 5 |
| Peter Corner | 0 | 0 | 0 | 1 | 2 | 1 | 0 | 1 | 0 | 1 | 6 |

| Sheet 2 | 1 | 2 | 3 | 4 | 5 | 6 | 7 | 8 | 9 | 10 | Final |
|---|---|---|---|---|---|---|---|---|---|---|---|
| Greg Balsdon 🔨 | 2 | 0 | 1 | 0 | 2 | 0 | 2 | 0 | X | X | 7 |
| Colin Dow | 0 | 4 | 0 | 1 | 0 | 4 | 0 | 3 | X | X | 12 |

== Playoffs ==
Page playoff system
1 | Mark Kean | 3
2 | John Epping | 8
3 | Colin Dow | 7
4 | Peter Corner | 10

Semifinal
1 | Mark Kean | 8
4 | Peter Corner | 4

Final
2 | John Epping | 6
1 | Mark Kean | 7

=== 1 vs. 2 ===
Saturday, February 7, 2:00 pm

| Team | 1 | 2 | 3 | 4 | 5 | 6 | 7 | 8 | 9 | 10 | Final |
|---|---|---|---|---|---|---|---|---|---|---|---|
| Mark Kean 🔨 | 0 | 1 | 0 | 0 | 1 | 0 | 1 | 0 | 0 | X | 3 |
| John Epping | 0 | 0 | 0 | 2 | 0 | 1 | 0 | 3 | 2 | X | 8 |

=== 3 vs. 4 ===
Saturday, February 7, 2:00 pm

| Team | 1 | 2 | 3 | 4 | 5 | 6 | 7 | 8 | 9 | 10 | 11 | Final |
|---|---|---|---|---|---|---|---|---|---|---|---|---|
| Colin Dow 🔨 | 0 | 2 | 1 | 0 | 0 | 3 | 1 | 0 | 0 | 0 | 0 | 7 |
| Peter Corner | 0 | 0 | 0 | 3 | 1 | 0 | 0 | 1 | 1 | 1 | 3 | 10 |

=== Semifinal ===
Sunday, February 8, 8:30 am

| Team | 1 | 2 | 3 | 4 | 5 | 6 | 7 | 8 | 9 | 10 | Final |
|---|---|---|---|---|---|---|---|---|---|---|---|
| Mark Kean 🔨 | 4 | 0 | 1 | 0 | 0 | 2 | 0 | 1 | X | X | 8 |
| Peter Corner | 0 | 1 | 0 | 0 | 2 | 0 | 1 | 0 | X | X | 4 |

=== Final ===
Sunday, February 8, 12:30 pm

| Team | 1 | 2 | 3 | 4 | 5 | 6 | 7 | 8 | 9 | 10 | Final |
|---|---|---|---|---|---|---|---|---|---|---|---|
| John Epping 🔨 | 0 | 1 | 0 | 3 | 0 | 1 | 0 | 0 | 1 | 0 | 6 |
| Mark Kean | 0 | 0 | 2 | 0 | 2 | 0 | 0 | 2 | 0 | 1 | 7 |

2015 Ontario Tankard

Mark Kean
1st Ontario Provincial Championship title

== Qualification ==
Southern Ontario zones will run from December 6–21, 2014 with regional tournaments scheduled for January 3–11. Two teams from each zone qualify to 4 regional tournaments, and two teams from each of the two tournaments qualify to provincials. Two additional teams qualify out of a second chance qualifier. As defending champions, the Greg Balsdon rink from the Glendale Golf and Country Club get an automatic berth in the Tankard.

| Qualification method | Berths | Qualifying team |
|---|---|---|
| Defending champions | 1 | Greg Balsdon |
| Region 1 Qualifiers | 2 | Ian MacAulay; Colin Dow |
| Region 2 Qualifiers | 2 | Mark Kean; John Epping |
| Region 3 Qualifiers | 2 | Cory Heggestad; Aaron Squires |
| Region 4 Qualifiers | 2 | Joe Frans; Jon St. Denis |
| Challenge Round Qualifiers | 2 | Robert Rumfeldt; Wayne Middaugh |

Regional Qualifiers In Bold

=== Zone Qualification ===
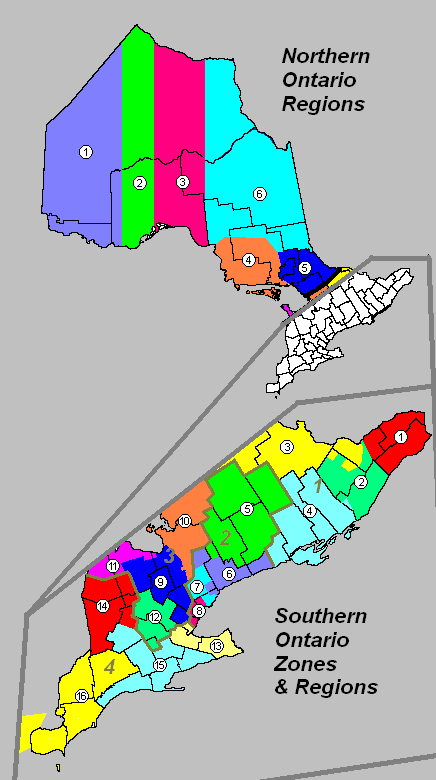
Zone Map

==== Zone 1 ====
December 12–14, at the RCMP Curling Club, Ottawa

Teams entered:

- Chris Gardner (Ottawa)
- **Ian MacAulay** (RCMP)
- **Mark Homan** (Ottawa)
- Doug Johnston (Ottawa)
- Gary Rowe (Ottawa)
- Rob Fraser (Ottawa)

Bracket:

| A Side | | | Semifinal | | | **Final** |
| | | | 1 | **Gardner** | **8** |
| 4 | **Johnston** | **7** | 4 | Johnston | 6 |
| 5 | Rowe | 1 | | | | 1 | Gardner | 4 |
| 3 | **Homan** | **6** | | | | 2 | **MacAulay** | **7** |
| 6 | Fraser | 4 | 3 | Homan | 6 |
| | | | 2 | **MacAulay** | **7** |

| B Side | | Semifinal | | **Final** |
| **Homan** | **6** |
| Rowe | 1 | **Homan** | **9** |
| **Johnston** | **7** | Johnston | 4 |
| Fraser | 3 | | | **Homan** | **9** |
| | | | | Gardner | 2 |

==== Zone 2 ====
December 12–14, at the RCMP Curling Club, Ottawa

Teams entered:

- Brian Lewis (Manotick)
- **Howard Rajala** (Rideau)
- **J. P. Lachance** (Rideau)
- Steve Lodge (Brockville)
- Andrew Bugg (Rideau)
- Bill Duck (Ottawa Hunt)

Bracket:

| A Side | | | Semifinal | | | **Final** |
| | | | 1 | **Lewis** | **7** |
| 4 | Lodge | 7 | 5 | Bugg | 6 |
| 5 | **Bugg** | **9** | | | | 1 | Lewis | 2 |
| 3 | Lachance | 4 | | | | 2 | **Rajala** | **8** |
| 6 | **Duck** | **6** | 6 | Duck | 2 |
| | | | 2 | **Rajala** | **8** |

| B Side | | Semifinal | | **Final** |
| **Lodge** | **6** |
| Duck | 4 | Lodge | 3 |
| **Lachance** | **9** | **Lachance** | **8** |
| Bugg | 5 | | | Lewis | 3 |
| | | | | **Lachance** | **7** |

==== Zone 3 ====
December 12–14, at the RCMP Curling Club, Ottawa

Teams entered:

- **Colin Dow** (Huntley)
- Doug Brewer (Dalhousie Lake)
- **Josh Adams** (Granite of Ottawa West)
- Stephen Watson (Renfrew)
- Dennis Elgie (City View)

Brackets:

| A Side | | | Semifinal | | | **Final** |
| | | | 2 | Brewer | 2 |
| | | | 3 | **Adams** | **9** |
| | | | | | | 3 | Adams | 2 |
| 4 | Watson | 4 | | | | 1 | **Dow** | **7** |
| 5 | **Elgie** | **7** | 5 | Elgie | 3 |
| | | | 1 | **Dow** | **8** |

| B Side | | Semifinal | | **Final** |
| | | | | **Adams** | **6** |
| **Brewer** | **8** | | | Brewer | 5 |
| Watson | 2 | **Brewer** | **10** |
| | | Elgie | 8 |

==== Zone 4 ====
December 20, at the Napanee & District Curling Club, Napanee

Teams entered:

- Don Bowser (Cataraqui)
- **Dave Collyer** (Quinte)
- **Bryce Rowe** (Napanee)
- Dennis Murray (Quinte)

Brackets:

| A side | | | A Final |
| 1 | **Bowser** | **8** |
| 4 | Murray | 2 | 1 | Bowser | 5 |
| 2 | **Collyer** | **9** | 2 | **Collyer** | **6** |
| 3 | Rowe | 2 |

| B side | | B Final |
| Murray | 4 |
| **Rowe** | **9** | **Rowe** | **9** |
| | | Bowser | 6 |

==== Zone 5 ====
December 20–21, at the Peterborough Curling Club, Peterborough

Teams entered:

- **Mark Kean** (Fenelon Falls)
- **Shannon Beddows** (Lindsay)
- Nick Rizzo (Peterborough)
- Jason Whitehill (Peterborough)
- Terry Arnold (Haliburton)
- Glenn Garneys (Peterborough)

Bracket:

| A Side | | | Semifinal | | | **Final** |
| | | | 1 | **Kean** | **7** |
| 4 | Whitehill | 6 | 5 | Arnold | 5 |
| 5 | **Arnold** | **8** | | | | 1 | **Kean** | **7** |
| 3 | **Rizzo** | **7** | | | | 3 | Rizzo | 3 |
| 6 | Garneys | 5 | 3 | **Rizzo** | **10** |
| | | | 2 | Beddows | 4 |

| B Side | | Semifinal | | **Final** |
| Whitehill | 7 |
| **Beddows** | **8** | **Beddows** | **10** |
| Garneys | 4 | Arnold | 5 |
| **Arnold** | **10** | | | Rizzo | 6 |
| | | | | **Beddows** | **10** |

==== Zone 6 ====
December 6–7, at the Unionville Curling Club, Unionville

Teams entered:

- **John Epping (Annandale)**
- Nathan Martin (Oshawa)
- **Richard Krell (Annandale)**
- Jason March (Annandale)
- Jim Bell (Unionville)
- Dave Fischer (Oshawa Golf)
- John Bell (Unionville)
- Rob Houston (Uxbridge)
- Kyle Mogavero (Oshawa)

Brackets:

A Side
8 | **Houston** | **9**
9 | Mogavero | 7

Quarterfinals
3 | **Krell** | **7**
6 | Fischer | 6
2 | Martin | 5
7 | **Jn. Bell** | **10**
8 | Houston | 4
1 | **Epping** | **8**
4 | March | 6
5 | **Jm. Bell** | **7**

Semifinals
**Krell** | **7**
Jn. Bell | 4
**Epping** | **8**
Jm. Bell | 2

A Final
Krell | 3
**Epping** | **4**

B Side
Fischer | 0
**Martin** | **7**

Quarterfinals
Martin | 2
**Mogavero** | **10**
**Houston** | **9**
March | 5

Semifinals
Mogavero | 7
**Jm. Bell** | **10**
**Houston** | **8**
Jn. Bell | 6

Finals
**Jm. Bell** | **7**
Houston | 1
B Final
Jm. Bell | 2
**Krell** | **6**

==== Zone 7 ====
December 13–14, at the York Curling Club, Newmarket

Teams entered:

- Rob Lobel (Thornhill)
- **Michael Shepherd** (Richmond Hill)
- Roy Arndt (Toronto Cricket)
- Brent Gray (Bayview)
- **Dave Coutanche** (Richmond Hill)
- Bryan Johnson (York)

Bracket:

| A Side | | | Semifinal | | | **Final** |
| | | | 1 | Lobel | 5 |
| 4 | **Gray** | **9** | 4 | **Gray** | **6** |
| 5 | Coutanche | 5 | | | | 4 | Gray | 5 |
| 3 | **Arndt** | **9** | | | | 2 | **Shepherd** | **6** |
| 6 | Johnson | 4 | 3 | Arndt | 2 |
| | | | 2 | **Shepherd** | **7** |

| B Side | | Semifinal | | **Final** |
| **Coutanche** | **6** |
| Arndt | 5 | **Coutanche** | **9** |
| **Johnson** | **6** | Johnson | 7 |
| Lobel | 5 | | | Gray | 6 |
| | | | | **Coutanche** | **7** |

==== Zone 8 ====
December 13–14, at the Dixie Curling Club, Mississauga

Teams entered:

- **Peter Corner** (St. George's)
- **Rob Retchless** (Royal Canadian)
- Josh Johnston (Royal Canadian)
- Dennis Moretto (Dixie)
- Patrick Morris (High Park)
- Craig Shinde (Dixie)
- Travis Belchior (Oakville)

Bracket:

A Side
4 | Moretto | 5
5 | **Morris** | **7**
3 | **Johnston** | **10**
6 | Shinde | 5
7 | Belchior | 7
2 | **Retchless** | **8**

Semifinal
1 | **Corner** | **5**
5 | Morris | 3
3 | Johnston | 2
2 | **Retchless** | **8**

**Final**
1 | Corner | 4
2 | **Retchless** | **7**

B side
Shinde | 5
**Belchior** | **8**

Quarterfinal
Morris | 6
**Belchior** | **7**
Moretto | 1
**Johnston** | **8**

Semifinal
Belchior | 4
**Johnston** | **9**

Final
**Corner** | **9**
Johnston | 4

==== Zone 9 ====
December 19–21, at The Club at North Halton, Georgetown

Teams entered:

- Jake Walker (Brampton)
- **Mike Harris** (North Halton)
- Ryan Myler (Brampton)
- Todd Dakers (Chinguacousy)
- **Alex Foster** (North Halton)
- Denis Cordick (North Halton)

Bracket:

| A Side | | | Semifinal | | | **Final** |
| | | | 1 | Walker | 4 |
| 4 | Dakers | 6 | 5 | **Foster** | **8** |
| 5 | **Foster** | **9** | | | | 5 | Foster | 8 |
| 3 | Myler | 4 | | | | 2 | **Harris** | **10** |
| 6 | **Cordick** | **8** | 6 | Cordick | 2 |
| | | | 2 | **Harris** | **9** |

| B Side | | Semifinal | | **Final** |
| Dakers | 7 |
| **Cordick** | **9** | Cordick | 1 |
| **Myler** | **9** | **Myler** | **9** |
| Walker | 8 | | | **Foster** | **8** |
| | | | | Myler | 5 |

==== Zone 10 ====
December 19–21, at the Midland Curling Club, Midland

Teams entered:

- **Glenn Howard** (Penetanguishene)
- **Darryl Prebble** (Cookstown)
- Andrew Thompson (Stroud)
- Chris Wimmer (Cookstown)
- Daryl Shane (Stroud)
- Bryan Wilson (Midland)
- Keith Press (Penetanguishene)

Bracket:

A Side
4 | **Wimmer** | **9**
5 | Shane | 5
3 | **Thompson** | **7**
6 | Wilson | 2
7 | Press | 3
2 | **Prebble** | **9**

Semifinal
1 | **Howard** | **8**
4 | Wimmer | 5
3 | Thompson | 5
2 | **Prebble** | **8**

**Final**
1 | **Howard** | **8**
2 | Prebble | 6

B side
**Wilson** | **10**
Press | 8

Quarterfinal
**Wimmer** | **7**
Wilson | 2
**Shane** | **10**
Thompson | 6

Semifinal
Wimmer | 5
**Shane** | **7**

Final
**Prebble** | **10**
Shane | 4

==== Zone 11 ====
December 13, at the Meaford Curling Club, Meaford

Teams entered:

- **Cory Heggestad** (Markdale)
- Ian Dickie (Collingwood)
- Scott Ballantyne (Tara)
- **Trevor Coburn** (Markdale)

Brackets:

| A side | | | A Final |
| 1 | Heggestad | 6 |
| 4 | **Coburn** | **7** | 4 | **Coburn** | **8** |
| 2 | **Dickie** | **12** | 2 | Dickie | 5 |
| 3 | Ballantyne | 5 |

| B side | | B Final |
| **Heggestad** | **9** |
| Ballantyne | 4 | **Heggestad** | **5** |
| | | Dickie | 3 |

==== Zone 12 ====
December 13, at the Galt Country Club, Cambridge

Teams entered:

- Robert Rumfeldt (Guelph)
- **Aaron Squires** (Kitchener-Waterloo Granite)
- Bruce McConnell (Kitchener-Waterloo Granite)
- **Damien Villard** (Galt Country)

Brackets:

| A side | | | A Final |
| 1 | **Rumfeldt** | **9** |
| 4 | McConnell | 7 | 1 | Rumfeldt | 7 |
| 2 | Squires | 3 | 3 | **Villard** | **8** |
| 3 | **Villard** | **7** |

| B side | | B Final |
| McConnell | 3 |
| **Squires** | **9** | **Squires** | **7** |
| | | Rumfeldt | 5 |

==== Zone 13 ====
December 6–7, at the Glendale Golf & Country Club, Hamilton

Teams entered:

- **Pat Ferris (Grimsby)**
- **Ian Robertson (Dundas Granite)**
- Bill Buchanan (Welland)
- Mark Fletcher (Burlington)
- Simon Ouellet (Glendale)
- Jason Stahl (Dundas Granite)

Brackets:

| A Side | | | Semifinals | | | A Final |
| | | | 1 | **Ferris** | **8** |
| 4 | Fletcher | 5 | 5 | Ouellet | 4 |
| 5 | **Ouellet** | **9** | | | | **Ferris** | **5** |
| 3 | **Buchanan** | **8** | | | | Robertson | 1 |
| 6 | Stahl | 5 | 3 | Buchanan | 4 |
| | | | 2 | **Robertson** | **10** |

| B Side | | Semifinals | | B Final |
| | | | | **Robertson** | **9** |
| Fletcher | 7 | | | Ouellet | 8 |
| **Buchanan** | **8** | Buchanan | 5 |
| Stahl | 5 | **Ouellet** | **10** |
| **Ouellet** | **10** |

==== Zone 14 ====
December 13, at the Listowel Curling Club, Listowel

Teams entered:

- **Brent Ross** (Harriston)
- **Jon St. Denis** (Listowel)
- Doug Gibson (Palmerston)
- Mike Schumacher (Walkerton)

Brackets:

| A side | | | A Final |
| 1 | **Ross** | **7** |
| 4 | Schumacher | 6 | 1 | **Ross** | **8** |
| 2 | St. Denis | 1 | 3 | Gibson | 3 |
| 3 | **Gibson** | **8** |

| B side | | B Final |
| Schumacher | 2 |
| **St. Denis** | **6** | **St. Denis** | **8** |
| | | Gibson | 7 |

==== Zone 15 ====
December 13–14, at the Brantford Golf & Country Club, Brantford

Teams entered:

- **Joe Frans** (St. Thomas)
- **Wayne Tuck, Jr.** (Brant)
- Terry Corbin (Brant)
- Bob Armstrong (Ingersoll)
- Jason Malcho (Stratford)

Bracket:

| A Side | | | Semifinal | | | **Final** |
| | | | 2 | **Tuck** | **11** |
| | | | 3 | Corbin | 6 |
| | | | | | | 2 | Tuck | 2 |
| 4 | **Armstrong** | **9** | | | | 1 | **Frans** | **7** |
| 5 | Malcho | 2 | 4 | Armstrong | 1 |
| | | | 1 | **Frans** | **7** |

| B Side | | Semifinal | | **Final** |
| | | | | **Tuck** | **7** |
| **Corbin** | **6** | | | Corbin | 0 |
| Malcho | 3 | **Corbin** | **7** |
| | | Armstrong | 3 |

==== Zone 16 ====
December 13–14, at the Chatham Granite Club, Chatham

Teams entered:

- **Scott McDonald** (Highland)
- **Dale Kelly** (Chatham Granite)
- John Young (Chatham Granite)
- Tom Pruliere (Ilderton)
- Chris Liscumb (Ilderton)
- Kirk Massey (London)
- Mike Drake (Kingsville)

Bracket:

A Side
4 | Pruliere | 8
5 | **Liscumb** | **9**
3 | **Young** | **10**
6 | Massey | 2
7 | Drake | 9
2 | **Kelly** | **11**

Semifinal
1 | **McDonald** | **10**
5 | Liscumb | 4
3 | Young | 5
2 | **Kelly** | **10**

**Final**
1 | McDonald | 4
2 | **Kelly** | **8**

B side
Massey | 3
**Drake** | **9**

Quarterfinal
**Liscumb** | **8**
Drake | 5
**Pruliere** | **12**
Young | 9

Semifinal
Liscumb | 4
**Pruliere** | **8**

Final
**McDonald** | **6**
Pruliere | 4

=== Regional qualification ===
==== Region 1 ====
January 10–11, Russell Curling Club, Russell

| A Side | | | Semifinal | | | **Final** |
| 1 | **Ian MacAulay** | **9** |
| 8 | Bryce Rowe | 2 | 1 | **Ian MacAulay** | **10** |
| 5 | J. P. Lachance | 1 | 4 | Howard Rajala | 7 |
| 4 | **Howard Rajala** | **9** | | | | 1 | **Ian MacAulay** | **9** |
| 3 | **Colin Dow** | **8** | | | | 3 | Colin Dow | 2 |
| 6 | Dave Collyer | 6 | 3 | **Colin Dow** | **6** |
| 7 | Josh Adams | 7 | 2 | Mark Homan | 2 |
| 2 | **Mark Homan** | **10** |

B side
8 | Bryce Rowe | 4
5 | **J. P. Lachance** | **7**
6 | **Dave Collyer** | **9**
7 | Josh Adams | 8

Quarterfinal
2 | **Mark Homan** | **10**
5 | J. P. Lachance | 3
4 | **Howard Rajala** | **7**
6 | Dave Collyer | 3

Semifinal
2 | **Mark Homan** | **10**
4 | Howard Rajala | 3

Final
3 | **Colin Dow** | **9**
2 | Mark Homan | 7

==== Region 2 ====
January 10–11, Whitby Curling Club, Whitby

| A Side | | | Semifinal | | | **Final** |
| 1 | **John Epping** | **10** |
| 8 | Dave Coutanche | 2 | 1 | **John Epping** | **7** |
| 5 | Shannon Beddows | 7 | 4 | Rob Retchless | 3 |
| 4 | **Rob Retchless** | **8** | | | | 1 | John Epping | 2 |
| 3 | Peter Corner | 4 | | | | 2 | **Mark Kean** | **8** |
| 6 | **Richard Krell** | **6** | 6 | Richard Krell | 4 |
| 7 | Michael Shepherd | 2 | 2 | **Mark Kean** | **8** |
| 2 | **Mark Kean** | **8** |

B side
8 | Dave Coutanche | 4
5 | **Shannon Beddows** | **5**
3 | Peter Corner | 4
7 | **Michael Shepherd** | **8**

Quarterfinal
6 | **Richard Krell** | **8**
5 | Shannon Beddows | 7
4 | **Rob Retchless** | **8**
7 | Michael Shepherd | 3

Semifinal
6 | Richard Krell | 5
4 | **Rob Retchless** | **9**

Final
1 | **John Epping** | **6**
4 | Rob Retchless | 5

==== Region 3 ====
January 3–4, Gravenhurst Curling Club, Gravenhurst

| A Side | | | Semifinal | | | **Final** |
| 1 | **Glenn Howard** | **8** |
| 8 | Trevor Coburn | 3 | 1 | Glenn Howard | 5 |
| 5 | **Damien Villard** | **4** | 5 | **Damien Villard** | **6** |
| 4 | Aaron Squires | 3 | | | | 5 | Damien Villard | 6 |
| 3 | **Cory Heggestad** | **8** | | | | 3 | **Cory Heggestad** | **7** |
| 6 | Mike Harris | 2 | 3 | **Cory Heggestad** | **6** |
| 7 | **Alex Foster** | **10** | 7 | Alex Foster | 3 |
| 2 | Darryl Prebble | 2 |

B side
8 | Trevor Coburn | 2
4 | **Aaron Squires** | **8**
6 | **Mike Harris** | **4**
2 | Darryl Prebble | 3

Quarterfinal
7 | Alex Foster | 1
4 | **Aaron Squires** | **7**
1 | **Glenn Howard** | **9**
6 | Mike Harris | 5

Semifinal
4 | **Aaron Squires** | **8**
1 | Glenn Howard | 4

Final
5 | Damien Villard | 6
4 | **Aaron Squires** | **8**

==== Region 4 ====
January 3–4, Wingham Golf & Curling Club, Wingham

| A Side | | | Semifinal | | | **Final** |
| 1 | **Joe Frans** | **10** |
| 8 | Ian Robertson | 5 | 1 | **Joe Frans** | **8** |
| 5 | **Wayne Tuck, Jr.** | **7** | 5 | Wayne Tuck, Jr. | 0 |
| 4 | Scott McDonald | 4 | | | | 1 | **Joe Frans** | **11** |
| 3 | **Brent Ross** | **7** | | | | 3 | Brent Ross | 5 |
| 6 | Dale Kelly | 6 | 3 | **Brent Ross** | **10** |
| 7 | **Jon St. Denis** | **7** | 7 | Jon St. Denis | 2 |
| 2 | Pat Ferris | 4 |

B side
8 | Ian Robertson | 3
4 | **Scott McDonald** | **7**
6 | Dale Kelly | 4
2 | **Pat Ferris** | **9**

Quarterfinal
7 | **Jon St. Denis** | **10**
4 | Scott McDonald | 4
5 | Wayne Tuck, Jr. | 6
2 | **Pat Ferris** | **7**

Semifinal
7 | **Jon St. Denis** | **8**
2 | Pat Ferris | 7

Final
3 | Brent Ross | 6
7 | **Jon St. Denis** | **7**

=== Challenge Round ===
January 16–19, at the Bradford & District Curling Club, Bradford

A Side
Rob Retchless | 6
**Brent Ross** | **7**
**Don Bowser** | **10**
Ian Dickie | 8
**Robert Rumfeldt** | **8**
Rob Houston | 5
3 | **Pat Ferris** | **9**
14 | Bill Buchanan | 3
6 | **Rob Lobel** | **8**
11 | Wayne Tuck, Jr. | 7
7 | Scott McDonald | 6
10 | **Wayne Middaugh** | **7**
2 | **Mark Homan** | **7**
15 | Dale Matchett | 2

Quarterfinals
1 | Glenn Howard | 5
9 | **Brent Ross** | **6**
5 | Don Bowser | 2
4 | **Robert Rumfeldt** | **8**
3 | **Pat Ferris** | **8**
6 | Rob Lobel | 5
10 | **Wayne Middaugh** | **8**
2 | Mark Homan | 7

Semifinals
9 | Brent Ross | 7
4 | **Robert Rumfeldt** | **10**
3 | Pat Ferris | 4
10 | **Wayne Middaugh** | **5**

**A Final**
4 | **Robert Rumfeldt** | **7**
10 | Wayne Middaugh | 2

| B Side (Top half) | | | Semifinals | | | Finals |
| | | | 2 | **Mark Homan** | **7** |
| | | | 8 | Rob Retchless | 0 |
| | | | | | | 2 | **Mark Homan** | **6** |
| 12 | **Ian Dickie** | **10** | | | | 12 | Ian Dickie | 4 |
| 13 | Rob Houston | 3 | 12 | **Ian Dickie** | **8** |
| | | | 6 | Rob Lobel | 5 |

B Side (Bottom half)
14 | Bill Buchanan | 2
11 | **Wayne Tuck, Jr.** | **9**
7 | **Scott McDonald** | **9**
15 | Dale Matchett | 4

Semifinals
5 | **Don Bowser** | **9**
11 | Wayne Tuck, Jr. | 8
7 | **Scott McDonald** | **8**
1 | Glenn Howard | 7

Finals
5 | Don Bowser | 4
7 | **Scott McDonald** | **7**

| B Side | | | Semifinal | | | **B Final** |
| | | | | | | 10 | **Wayne Middaugh** | **6** |
| 9 | Brent Ross | 4 | | | | 7 | Scott McDonald | 2 |
| 2 | **Mark Homan** | **9** | 2 | Mark Homan | 1 |
| 3 | Pat Ferris | 3 | 7 | **Scott McDonald** | **6** |
| 7 | **Scott McDonald** | **6** |
