= Colin Dow =

Canadian curler

Colin Dow (born c. 1988) is a Canadian curler from Ottawa.

In 2009, Dow lost the final of the Ontario junior mixed championship to Mark Kean, his future skip.

Dow played in his first provincial men's championship in 2010, playing second for the Bryan Cochrane rink. The team would go on to make it to the final of the event, losing to Glenn Howard in the final.

Dow took the 2013-14 season off to focus on getting a Master's Degree from the University of Waterloo. He returned in the 2014-15 season forming a new team with Ritchie Gillan, Brett Lyon-Hatcher and John Steski. They entered one WCT event, the 2014 Stroud Sleeman Cash Spiel, which they won. This was the first WCT event that Dow won his career. Dow and his team qualified for the 2015 Ontario Tankard. His team surprised many by making it to the playoffs, after posting a 6-4 round robin record. Following the round robin, they beat Greg Balsdon in a tiebreaker match, but lost to the Wayne Middaugh-skipped Peter Corner rink in the 3 vs. 4 game. In 2016, Gillan was replaced by Steve Allen. The team would not make it to another provincial.

In 2017, Dow joined the Mark Kean rink at third. On the tour, the team won the CookstownCash presented by Comco Canada Inc. The team played in the 2018 Ontario Tankard, just missing out on the playoffs. This team would only last one season, with Dow forming his own rink again in 2018 with Jordie Lyon-Hatcher, Brett Lyon-Hatcher and John Steski. The team qualified for the 2019 Ontario Tankard, finishing with a 2-7 record.
