= Jon St. Denis =

Canadian curler

Jon St. Denis (born c. 1978) is a Canadian curler from Stouffville, Ontario. He currently skips a team on the World Curling Tour.

St. Denis won the 2004 Tim Hortons Colts championship in 2004 skipping a team from the Dixie Curling Club.

St. Denis began skipping on the World Curling Tour in 2014 after having played third for Chris Ciasnocha the previous two seasons (Ciasnocha now throws third for the team). St. Denis qualified for the 2015 Ontario Tankard, his first provincial championship of his career.

St. Denis represented Ontario at the 2017 Travelers Curling Club Championship, representing the Richmond Hill Curling Club.

== Personal life ==
St. Denis works as an insurance agent for State Farm.
