= Ian Dickie =

Canadian curler

- Curler
- Born: December 21, 1985 (age 40); Bracebridge, Ontario

Team
- Curling club: Mississaugua G&CC, Mississauga, ON
- Skip: Ian Dickie
- Third: Paul Moffatt
- Second: Ben Shane
- Lead: Kyle Forster

Curling career
- Member Association: Northern Ontario (2007–2009); Ontario (2010–present)
- Top CTRS ranking: 17th (2019–20)

Ian Dickie (born December 21, 1985, in Bracebridge, Ontario) is a Canadian curler from Newmarket, Ontario. He currently skips his own team based in the Kitchener area.

== Career ==
While attending Laurentian University in Greater Sudbury, Ontario, Dickie played in both the 2007 and 2009 Northern Ontario men's curling championships.

After university, Dickie moved to Newmarket, Ontario. He played second for the Chris Ciasnocha rink for one season (2013–14) before forming his own rink as a skip in 2014. Dickie's first Tour event was the 2013 Stu Sells Oakville Tankard. After forming his own team, Dickie re-joined the World Curling Tour for the 2015–16 season. His team found immediate success by making the final of the 2015 KW Fall Classic to China's Liu Rui and making the semi-final of the 2015 Huron ReproGraphics Oil Heritage Classic.

Dickie made his first Ontario Tankard provincial men's championship in 2016, where he led his rink of Tyler Stewart, Evan Lilly and Robert Currie to a 3–7 round robin record.

Dickie joined the Pat Ferris rink in 2019 as his third. The team played in the 2020 Ontario Tankard, finishing with a 3–5 record. They played in the 2021 Canadian Olympic Curling Pre-Trials, finishing with a 2–4 record. Later in the season they played in the 2022 Ontario Tankard, where they were eliminated in a triple knockout after winning two games.

For the 2022–23 curling season, Dickie joined the Jason Camm rink at third. The team won two tour events, the Capital Curling Fall Open and the Capital Curling Classic. Their success on the tour qualified them for the 2023 Ontario Tankard.

== Personal life ==
Dickie is employed as a sales director with GNB Industrial Power. He is married and has three children.
