= Richard Krell =

Canadian curler (born 1992)

- Curler
- Born: July 13, 1992 (age 34); London, Ontario

Team
- Curling club: Langley Curling Centre, Langley, BC
- Skip: Richard Krell
- Third: Daniel Wenzek
- Second: Jordan Tardi
- Lead: Nick Meister

Curling career
- Member Association: Ontario (2015–2022); British Columbia (2022–present)
- Top CTRS ranking: 34th (2023–24)

Richard Frederick Krell (born July 13, 1992) is a Canadian curler from Canmore, Alberta. He currently skips his own team out of Langley, British Columbia.

== Career ==
=== University curling ===
Krell was a member of the Wilfrid Laurier University curling team, winning provincial titles in 2015 and 2016 and a national title in 2016. Krell has played in the 2014, 2015 and 2016 CIS/CCA Curling Championships for Laurier, throwing third stones for Aaron Squires.

=== Men's ===
While playing third for Laurier, Krell would also skip his own team on the World Curling Tour. He has been skipping a team on the WCT since 2013. Krell won his first tour event by winning the 2016 KW Fall Classic.

== Personal life ==
Krell graduated from Laurier in 2016 with a degree in Communication Studies. He attended London Central Secondary School in London, Ontario.
