= Pat Ferris =

Canadian curler from Grimsby, Ontario

- Curler
- Born: October 28, 1975 (age 51); North York, Ontario

Team
- Curling club: Grimsby CC; Grimsby, ON
- Skip: Pat Ferris
- Third: Travis Fanset
- Second: Rob Ainsley
- Lead: Scott Clinton

Curling career
- Member Association: Ontario
- Top CTRS ranking: 16th (2022–23)

Patrick "Pat" Ferris (born October 28, 1975, in North York, Ontario) is a Canadian curler from Grimsby, Ontario. He currently skips his own team.

== Career ==
Ferris had a successful junior career. In 1993, he skipped his Sutton District High School team to a provincial schoolboy championship. He won back to back provincial junior titles in 1995 and 1996. This qualified Ferris to skip the Ontario team at the Canadian Junior Curling Championships in both of those years. At the 1995 Canadian Juniors, he led Ontario and teammates Chris Schell, Bryan Johnson and Paul Webster to a 6–5 record, missing the playoffs. In 1996, his rink would find more success. The team, which consisted of Johnson, Shaun Harris and future U.S. champion Heath McCormick finished the round robin with a 7–5 record, in a 4-way tie for 3rd. In their first tiebreaker match, the team lost to Nova Scotia.

Pat Ferris competes regularly on the World and Ontario Curling Tours having amassed 8 career victories, including the 2014 CookstownCash presented by Comco Canada Inc. WCT event. He has competed in 11 Ontario Tankard Provincial Championships (as of 2025).

Ferris qualified for his first Grand Slam of Curling event by winning the 2022 Stu Sells Brantford Nissan Classic. By winning, his rink played in the 2023 Champions Cup, where they did not make the playoffs.

== Personal life ==
Pat Ferris resides in Grimsby, Ontario with his Wife and two Daughters. He is a Commercial Insurance Broker with Milmine Insurance Brokers in Stoney Creek.
