= 2016 Ontario Tankard =

2016 Recharge With Milk Tankard
- Host city: Brantford, Ontario
- Arena: Wayne Gretzky Sports Centre
- Dates: February 1–7
- Winner: Glenn Howard
- Curling club: St. George's G&CC, Toronto
- Skip: Glenn Howard
- Third: Richard Hart
- Second: Adam Spencer
- Lead: Scott Howard
- Finalist: John Epping

The 2016 Ontario Tankard, the Southern Ontario men's provincial curling championship, was held from February 1 to 7 at the Wayne Gretzky Sports Centre in Brantford, Ontario. The winning Glenn Howard rink represented Ontario at the 2016 Tim Hortons Brier in Ottawa.

The Howard rink from Toronto defeated the John Epping rink (also from Toronto) in the final. It is Howard's 16th provincial championship title (ninth as skip).

== Teams ==
Skip	Third	Second	Lead	Alternate	Club(s)
Greg Balsdon	Don Bowser	Jonathan Beuk	Scott Chadwick		Cataraqui Golf and Country Club, Kingston
Mark Bice	Aaron Squires	Tyler Morgan	Steve Bice	Jamie Farnell	Sarnia Golf & Curling Club, Sarnia
Dayna Deruelle	Kevin Flewwelling	David Staples	Sean Harrison		Brampton Curling Club, Brampton
Ian Dickie	Tyler Stewart	Evan Lilly	Robert Currie		King Curling Club, Schomberg
John Epping	Mathew Camm	Patrick Janssen	Tim March		Donalda Curling Club, Toronto
Pat Ferris	Andrew Fairfull	Craig Fairfull	Nathan Small		Grimsby Curling Club, Grimsby
Travis Fanset^{2}	Joe Frans	Craig Van Ymeren	Fraser Reid		Ingersoll & District Curling Club, Ingersoll
Mike Harris	Mike Anderson	Scott Hodgson	Scott Foster		Toronto Cricket, Skating and Curling Club, Toronto
Mike McLean	Jake Higgs (skip)	Kevin Lagerquist	Nathan Crawford		Pakenham Curling Club, Pakenham
Glenn Howard	Richard Hart	Adam Spencer^{1}	Scott Howard		St. George's Golf and Country Club, Etobicoke, Toronto
Wayne Tuck, Jr.	Chad Allen	Jay Allen	Andrew Tournay	Ian Parker	Brant Curling Club, Brantford

^{1}Spencer was added to the team, replacing Richard Hart, who was bumped up to third, as Howard's regular third, Wayne Middaugh suffered an injury in a skiing accident and will have to miss out the remainder of the season.
^{2}Scott Bailey, the regular skip of this team was not able to play due work commitments; Fanset skipped the team in his place. Fraser Reid was added as a spare.

== Round-robin standings ==
Key
Teams to Playoffs
Teams to Tiebreaker

Skip (Club)	W	L	PF	PA	Ends Won	Ends Lost	Blank Ends	Stolen Ends
Glenn Howard (St. George's)	10	0	94	47	57	36	18	16
John Epping (Donalda)	8	2	80	50	52	30	17	23
Greg Balsdon (Cataraqui)	7	3	66	66	46	52	14	17
Mike Harris (Toronto Cricket)	6	4	67	63	40	44	19	11
Joe Frans (Ingersoll)	5	5	61	66	41	37	15	13
Jake Higgs (Pakenham)	5	5	61	47	34	38	16	10
Dayna Deruelle (Brampton)	4	6	60	56	40	35	17	12
Ian Dickie (King)	3	7	44	72	27	46	14	5
Pat Ferris (Grimsby)	3	7	38	55	33	49	9	7
Mark Bice (Sarnia)	3	7	49	62	35	39	13	8
Wayne Tuck, Jr. (Brant)	1	9	51	83	45	42	8	11

== Results ==
=== Draw 1 ===
February 1, 2:00 pm

Sheet A	1	2	3	4	5	6	7	8	9	10	Final
John Epping	1	1	2	1	3	0	X	X	X	X	8
Ian Dickie 🔨	0	0	0	0	0	1	X	X	X	X	1

Sheet B	1	2	3	4	5	6	7	8	9	10	Final
Mark Bice	0	0	1	1	0	0	0	0	1	3	6
Joe Frans 🔨	0	1	0	0	1	0	0	1	0	0	3

Sheet C	1	2	3	4	5	6	7	8	9	10	Final
Jake Higgs 🔨	1	0	1	0	1	0	0	0	2	X	5
Glenn Howard	0	1	0	3	0	1	1	1	0	X	7

Sheet D	1	2	3	4	5	6	7	8	9	10	Final
Dayna Deruelle 🔨	0	1	0	1	1	0	0	1	0	0	4
Mike Harris	0	0	3	0	0	1	0	0	0	1	5

Sheet E	1	2	3	4	5	6	7	8	9	10	Final
Wayne Tuck, Jr.	0	0	1	0	0	1	2	0	1	0	5
Greg Balsdon 🔨	1	0	0	2	0	0	0	2	0	1	6

=== Draw 2 ===
February 1, 7:00 pm

Sheet A	1	2	3	4	5	6	7	8	9	10	Final
Glenn Howard 🔨	2	2	0	2	0	0	2	X	X	X	8
Mike Harris	0	0	2	0	0	1	0	X	X	X	3

Sheet B	1	2	3	4	5	6	7	8	9	10	Final
Wayne Tuck, Jr.	0	0	1	0	0	1	0	X	X	X	2
Mark Bice 🔨	1	2	0	2	1	0	2	X	X	X	8

Sheet C	1	2	3	4	5	6	7	8	9	10	Final
Ian Dickie	3	0	0	0	1	0	0	0	0	X	4
Greg Balsdon 🔨	0	1	1	1	0	2	2	1	1	X	9

Sheet D	1	2	3	4	5	6	7	8	9	10	Final
John Epping	1	0	1	1	1	2	X	X	X	X	6
Pat Ferris 🔨	0	0	0	0	0	0	X	X	X	X	0

Sheet E	1	2	3	4	5	6	7	8	9	10	Final
Jake Higgs	0	0	1	0	0	2	2	0	0	0	5
Joe Frans 🔨	1	1	0	1	0	0	0	2	1	1	7

=== Draw 3 ===
February 2, 2:00 pm

Sheet A	1	2	3	4	5	6	7	8	9	10	Final
Greg Balsdon 🔨	2	0	0	1	0	3	0	1	1	X	8
Pat Ferris	0	1	2	0	1	0	1	0	0	X	5

Sheet B	1	2	3	4	5	6	7	8	9	10	11	Final
Jake Higgs 🔨	0	2	0	0	1	1	2	0	0	0	1	7
Wayne Tuck, Jr.	1	0	1	1	0	0	0	1	1	1	0	6

Sheet C	1	2	3	4	5	6	7	8	9	10	Final
Mike Harris 🔨	0	1	0	4	0	2	0	0	3	X	10
Joe Frans	1	0	1	0	2	0	0	1	0	X	5

Sheet D	1	2	3	4	5	6	7	8	9	10	Final
Glenn Howard 🔨	1	0	0	1	0	0	0	1	0	1	4
Dayna Deruelle	0	1	0	0	0	0	1	0	1	0	3

Sheet E	1	2	3	4	5	6	7	8	9	10	Final
Ian Dickie	0	0	0	2	0	1	0	0	2	X	5
Mark Bice 🔨	0	0	1	0	0	0	1	1	0	X	3

=== Draw 4 ===
February 2, 7:00 pm

Sheet A	1	2	3	4	5	6	7	8	9	10	Final
Joe Frans	0	1	2	0	0	0	0	2	0	1	6
Dayna Deruelle 🔨	0	0	0	0	0	0	1	0	2	0	3

Sheet B	1	2	3	4	5	6	7	8	9	10	Final
Jake Higgs	0	0	0	0	1	0	4	0	2	X	7
Ian Dickie 🔨	0	0	0	0	0	1	0	1	0	X	2

Sheet C	1	2	3	4	5	6	7	8	9	10	Final
Pat Ferris	0	0	1	3	0	2	0	3	0	X	9
Mark Bice 🔨	1	2	0	0	2	0	1	0	1	X	7

Sheet D	1	2	3	4	5	6	7	8	9	10	Final
Greg Balsdon	0	0	0	0	0	0	2	0	X	X	2
John Epping 🔨	0	2	2	1	0	0	0	3	X	X	8

Sheet E	1	2	3	4	5	6	7	8	9	10	Final
Mike Harris 🔨	2	1	0	0	1	0	2	0	0	X	6
Wayne Tuck, Jr.	0	0	0	2	0	0	0	2	0	X	4

=== Draw 5 ===
February 3, 9:00 am

Sheet A	1	2	3	4	5	6	7	8	9	10	Final
Mark Bice	0	0	0	2	0	2	0	0	X	X	4
John Epping 🔨	0	1	1	0	4	0	1	2	X	X	9

Sheet B	1	2	3	4	5	6	7	8	9	10	Final
Ian Dickie 🔨	0	1	0	3	0	2	0	0	1	0	7
Mike Harris	1	0	2	0	2	0	2	1	0	1	9

Sheet C	1	2	3	4	5	6	7	8	9	10	Final
Dayna Deruelle	0	3	0	0	1	1	0	3	4	X	12
Wayne Tuck, Jr.	2	0	2	0	0	0	1	0	0	X	5

Sheet D	1	2	3	4	5	6	7	8	9	10	Final
Glenn Howard 🔨	2	0	4	0	3	X	X	X	X	X	9
Joe Frans	0	1	0	1	0	X	X	X	X	X	2

Sheet E	1	2	3	4	5	6	7	8	9	10	Final
Jake Higgs 🔨	0	0	2	0	0	2	0	0	2	0	6
Pat Ferris	0	0	0	0	3	0	2	1	0	1	7

=== Draw 6 ===
February 3, 2:30 pm

Sheet A	1	2	3	4	5	6	7	8	9	10	Final
Glenn Howard	0	1	2	0	1	0	3	0	2	X	9
Wayne Tuck, Jr. 🔨	1	0	0	1	0	1	0	2	0	X	5

Sheet B	1	2	3	4	5	6	7	8	9	10	Final
Mike Harris 🔨	0	2	1	0	2	1	1	X	X	X	7
Pat Ferris	0	0	0	1	0	0	0	X	X	X	1

Sheet C	1	2	3	4	5	6	7	8	9	10	Final
Jake Higgs	2	0	0	2	0	1	0	3	X	X	8
John Epping 🔨	0	1	0	0	1	0	1	0	X	X	3

Sheet D	1	2	3	4	5	6	7	8	9	10	Final
Greg Balsdon	0	0	2	1	1	0	0	1	0	1	6
Mark Bice 🔨	0	2	0	0	0	0	1	0	2	0	5

Sheet E	1	2	3	4	5	6	7	8	9	10	11	Final
Ian Dickie 🔨	0	0	0	0	0	1	0	0	1	2	0	4
Dayna Deruelle	1	1	1	0	0	0	0	1	0	0	1	5

=== Draw 7 ===
February 3, 7:30 pm

Sheet A	1	2	3	4	5	6	7	8	9	10	Final
Jake Higgs	1	0	0	0	0	2	0	4	X	X	7
Greg Balsdon 🔨	0	1	0	1	0	0	0	0	X	X	2

Sheet B	1	2	3	4	5	6	7	8	9	10	Final
Pat Ferris 🔨	1	0	0	3	0	1	0	1	1	1	8
Dayna Deruelle	0	1	0	0	3	0	2	0	0	0	6

Sheet C	1	2	3	4	5	6	7	8	9	10	Final
Glenn Howard 🔨	0	2	3	4	2	X	X	X	X	X	11
Ian Dickie	0	0	0	0	0	X	X	X	X	X	0

Sheet D	1	2	3	4	5	6	7	8	9	10	11	Final
Joe Frans	2	0	0	0	3	0	2	1	0	0	1	9
Wayne Tuck, Jr. 🔨	0	2	1	1	0	1	0	0	2	1	0	8

Sheet E	1	2	3	4	5	6	7	8	9	10	Final
Mike Harris	0	2	0	0	0	0	0	0	X	X	2
John Epping 🔨	0	0	2	1	1	1	0	1	X	X	6

=== Draw 8 ===
February 4, 2:00 pm

Sheet A	1	2	3	4	5	6	7	8	9	10	Final
Ian Dickie	0	0	1	0	0	1	0	0	X	X	2
Joe Frans 🔨	2	0	0	0	1	0	0	4	X	X	7

Sheet B	1	2	3	4	5	6	7	8	9	10	Final
Dayna Deruelle 🔨	2	2	0	1	0	1	0	0	1	0	7
John Epping	0	0	1	0	2	0	2	1	0	2	8

Sheet C	1	2	3	4	5	6	7	8	9	10	Final
Greg Balsdon 🔨	0	1	1	1	0	2	0	1	2	X	8
Mike Harris	0	0	0	0	1	0	2	0	0	X	3

Sheet D	1	2	3	4	5	6	7	8	9	10	Final
Jake Higgs 🔨	0	0	1	0	0	1	0	1	0	X	3
Mark Bice	2	1	0	0	0	0	1	0	2	X	6

Sheet E	1	2	3	4	5	6	7	8	9	10	Final
Glenn Howard 🔨	1	1	0	0	2	1	1	0	1	X	7
Pat Ferris	0	0	1	0	0	0	0	2	0	X	3

=== Draw 9 ===
February 4, 7:00

Sheet A	1	2	3	4	5	6	7	8	9	10	Final
Mike Harris 🔨	1	0	0	2	0	2	1	0	3	X	9
Mark Bice	0	1	0	0	1	0	0	1	0	X	3

Sheet B	1	2	3	4	5	6	7	8	9	10	Final
Glenn Howard	0	2	0	0	1	0	0	0	3	1	7
John Epping 🔨	1	0	0	1	0	0	0	1	0	0	3

Sheet C	1	2	3	4	5	6	7	8	9	10	Final
Joe Frans 🔨	1	0	2	0	0	1	0	2	1	1	8
Pat Ferris	0	2	0	1	0	0	2	0	0	0	5

Sheet D	1	2	3	4	5	6	7	8	9	10	Final
Ian Dickie	0	0	1	0	0	3	0	1	0	5	10
Wayne Tuck, Jr. 🔨	1	1	0	1	2	0	1	0	1	0	7

Sheet E	1	2	3	4	5	6	7	8	9	10	Final
Greg Balsdon 🔨	1	0	1	1	0	1	0	2	0	0	6
Dayna Deruelle	0	0	0	0	1	0	1	0	2	1	5

=== Draw 10 ===
February 5, 2:00 pm

Sheet A	1	2	3	4	5	6	7	8	9	10	11	Final
Pat Ferris	0	2	1	2	0	1	0	0	0	1	0	7
Wayne Tuck, Jr. 🔨	2	0	0	0	2	0	2	1	0	0	1	8

Sheet B	1	2	3	4	5	6	7	8	9	10	Final
Glenn Howard 🔨	1	0	2	0	1	0	2	1	1	1	9
Greg Balsdon	0	3	0	1	0	3	0	0	0	0	7

Sheet C	1	2	3	4	5	6	7	8	9	10	Final
Mark Bice 🔨	2	0	0	1	0	1	0	1	0	X	5
Dayna Deruelle	0	1	1	0	2	0	3	0	1	X	8

Sheet D	1	2	3	4	5	6	7	8	9	10	Final
Jake Higgs 🔨	0	2	1	5	X	X	X	X	X	X	8
Mike Harris	0	0	0	0	X	X	X	X	X	X	0

Sheet E	1	2	3	4	5	6	7	8	9	10	Final
Joe Frans 🔨	4	0	1	0	1	0	0	2	0	0	8
John Epping	0	2	0	1	0	3	1	0	3	1	11

=== Draw 11 ===
February 5, 7:00 pm

Sheet A	1	2	3	4	5	6	7	8	9	10	Final
Jake Higgs	0	0	0	2	0	0	1	2	0	0	5
Dayna Deruelle 🔨	2	1	1	0	0	1	0	0	1	1	7

Sheet B	1	2	3	4	5	6	7	8	9	10	Final
Greg Balsdon 🔨	0	0	2	1	1	0	0	3	0	0	7
Joe Frans	1	0	0	0	0	0	2	0	2	1	6

Sheet C	1	2	3	4	5	6	7	8	9	10	Final
Wayne Tuck, Jr.	0	0	1	0	0	X	X	X	X	X	1
John Epping 🔨	4	3	0	2	0	X	X	X	X	X	9

Sheet D	1	2	3	4	5	6	7	8	9	10	Final
Ian Dickie	1	0	1	0	3	1	0	1	0	2	9
Pat Ferris 🔨	0	1	0	2	0	0	1	0	2	0	6

Sheet E	1	2	3	4	5	6	7	8	9	10	Final
Glenn Howard	2	0	2	1	0	3	X	X	X	X	8
Mark Bice 🔨	0	1	0	0	1	0	X	X	X	X	2

== Playoffs ==
Page playoff system
1	Glenn Howard	4
2	John Epping	5
3	Greg Balsdon	4
4	Mike Harris	9

Semifinal
1	Glenn Howard	5
4	Mike Harris	4

Final
2	John Epping	5
1	Glenn Howard	6

=== 1 vs. 2 ===
Sheet A	1	2	3	4	5	6	7	8	9	10	Final
Glenn Howard	0	0	0	1	0	0	2	0	1	0	4
John Epping 🔨	0	2	0	0	0	1	0	1	0	1	5

=== 3 vs. 4 ===
Sheet A	1	2	3	4	5	6	7	8	9	10	Final
Greg Balsdon 🔨	1	0	1	1	0	1	0	0	0	X	4
Mike Harris	0	3	0	0	2	0	1	1	2	X	9

=== Semifinal ===
Sheet C	1	2	3	4	5	6	7	8	9	10	11	Final
Glenn Howard 🔨	0	1	0	0	0	0	2	0	1	0	1	5
Mike Harris	0	0	0	1	0	0	0	1	0	2	0	4

=== Final ===
Sheet C	1	2	3	4	5	6	7	8	9	10	Final
Glenn Howard	0	2	0	1	0	0	0	1	0	2	6
John Epping 🔨	1	0	2	0	0	1	0	0	1	0	5

2016 Ontario Tankard

Glenn Howard
16th Ontario Provincial Championship title

== Qualification ==
Southern Ontario zones ran from December 18–20, 2015 with regional tournaments held January 2–3. Two teams from each zone qualify to 4 regional tournaments, and two teams from each of the two tournaments qualify to provincials. Two additional teams qualify out of a second chance qualifier. As the defending champion Mark Kean rink disbanded in the off season, the 2015 runner-up John Epping rink from the Dondalda Curling Club automatically qualified in the defending champion berth.

Qualification method	Berths	Qualifying team
Defending champions	1	~~Mark Kean~~; John Epping (runner up)
Region 1 Qualifiers	2	Greg Balsdon; Jake Higgs
Region 2 Qualifiers	2	Mike Harris; Glenn Howard
Region 3 Qualifiers	2	Dayna Deruelle; Ian Dickie
Region 4 Qualifiers	2	Mark Bice; Scott Bailey
Challenge Round Qualifiers	2	Wayne Tuck, Jr. Pat Ferris

Regional Qualifiers In Bold

=== Zone Qualification ===
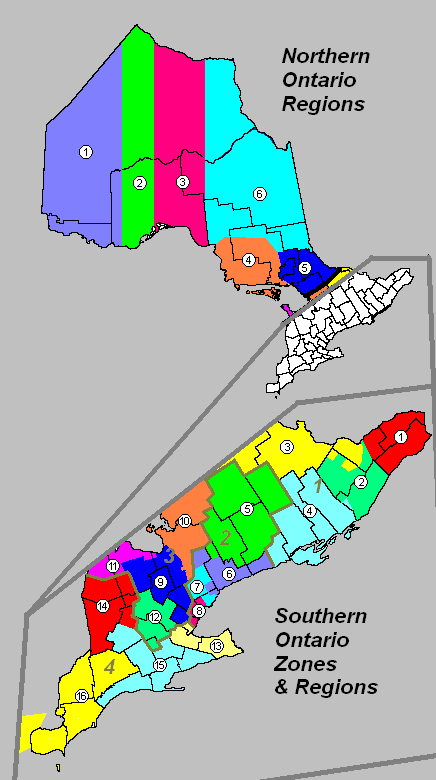
Zone Map

==== Zone 1 ====
RCMP Curling Club, Ottawa

Teams entered:

- David Coffey (Ottawa)
- **Willie Jeffries** (Ottawa)
- **Ryan McCrady** (Ottawa)
- Stephen Watson (Ottawa)

Bracket:

A side
**McCrady**	**W**
Coffey	L
**Watson**	**W**
Jeffries	L
B side
Coffey	4
**Jeffries**	**8**

A Final
Watson	4
**McCrady**	**7**
B Final
Watson	2
**Jeffries**	**10**

==== Zone 2 ====
RCMP Curling Club, Ottawa

Teams entered:

- **J.P. Lachance** (Rideau)
- **Jason Reid** (Rideau)
- Spencher Richmond (Perth)

Bracket:

A side
**Richmond**	**W**
Reid	L

A Final
Richmond	3
**Lachance**	**9**
B Final
**Reid**	**5**
Richmond	4

==== Zone 3 ====
RCMP Curling Club, Ottawa

Teams entered:

- Josh Adams (Granite of Ottawa West)
- Douglas Brewer (Dalhousie Lake)
- **Colin Dow** (Huntley)
- **Jake Higgs** (Pakenham)

Bracket:

A side
Brewer	L
**Dow**	**W**
**Higgs**	**W**
Adams	L
B side
Brewer	7
**Adams**	**8**

A Final
Higgs	5
**Dow**	**6**
B Final
Adams	5
**Higgs**	**8**

==== Zone 4 ====
Royal Kingston Curling Club, Kingston

Teams entered:

- **Greg Balsdon** (Cataraqui)
- **Dave Collyer** (Quinte)
- Rob Dickson (Napanee)
- Matt Mills (Cataraqui)

Bracket:

A side
**Balsdon**	**8**
Dickson	3
Mills	7
**Collyer**	**10**
B side
**Dickson**	**9**
Mills	3

A Final
**Balsdon**	**6**
Collyer	4
B Final
Dickson	5
**Collyer**	**8**

==== Zone 5 ====
Beaverton Curling Club, Beaverton

Teams entered:

- **John Bolton** (Lindsay)
- **Scott McDonald** (Peterborough)
- Jake Speedie (Beaverton)

Bracket:

A side
Speedie	4
**McDonald**	**11**

A Final
Bolton	4
**McDonald**	**10**
B Final
**Bolton**	**10**
Speedie	2

==== Zone 6 ====
Uxbridge & District Curling Club, Uxbridge

Teams entered:

- Jim Bell (Unionville)
- David Fischer (Oshawa Golf)
- **Rob Houston** (Port Perry)
- **Jake Walker** (Annandale)

Bracket:

A side
Fischer	3
**Walker**	**9**
Bell	3
**Houston**	**7**
B side
Fischer	7
**Bell**	**9**

A Final
**Houston**	**8**
Walker	4
B Final
Bell	2
**Walker**	**7**

==== Zone 7 ====
East York Curling Club, East York

Teams entered:

- Dave Coutanche (Richmond Hill)
- Brent Gray (Bayview)
- **Mike Harris** (Toronto Cricket)
- Rob Lobel (Thornhill)
- Jason March (Scarboro)
- Darryl Prebble (Scarboro)
- **Michael Shepherd** (Richmond Hill)

Brackets:

A Side	Semifinal	**Final**
**Gray**	**10**
Prebble	5
Lobel	4
**Gray**	**6**
**Harris**	**6**
Gray	1
March	2
**Shepherd**	**8**
**Harris**	**12**
Shepherd	5
Coutanche	3
**Harris**	**10**
B side	Quarterfinal	Semifinal	Final
**Prebble**	**11**
**March**	**11**	March	6	Gray	3
Coutanche	9	Prebble	4	**Shepherd**	**8**
**Shepherd**	**8**
Lobel	1
**Shepherd**	**9**

==== Zone 8 ====
Dixie Curling Club, Mississauga

Teams entered:

- Roy Arndt (Dixie)
- **Glenn Howard** (St. George's)
- **Josh Johnston** (Royals)
- Dennis Moretto (Dixie)
- Patrick Morris (High Park)
- Guy Racette (Royals)
- Rob Retchless (Royals)
- Craig Shinde (Dixie)

Brackets:

A Side	Semifinal	**Final**
Morris	5
**Howard**	**10**
**Howard**	**8**
Arndt	3
Racette	4
**Arndt**	**8**
Retchless	1
**Howard**	**6**
**Johnston**	**10**
Shinde	6
**Retchless**	**8**
Johnston	1
**Retchless**	**10**
Moretto	6
B side	Quarterfinal	Semifinal	Final
**Johnston**	**8**
Racette	9	Morris	0	**Johnston**	**7**
**Morris**	**10**	**Johnston**	**8**	Retchless	4
Shinde	3
Arndt	6
**Shinde**	**7**	**Shinde**	**9**
Moretto	5

==== Zone 9 ====
Orangeville Curling Club, Orangeville

Teams entered:

- Travis Belchior (Orangeville)
- **Dayna Deruelle** (Brampton)
- **Ian Dickie** (King)
- Michael McGaugh (Chinguacousy)

Brackets:

A side
**Dickie**	**6**
Belchior	2
McGaugh	4
**Deruelle**	**5**
B side
**McGaugh**	**8**
Belchior	2

A Final
Dickie	1
**Deruelle**	**9**
B Final
McGaugh	3
**Dickie**	**7**

==== Zone 10 ====
Parry Sound Curling Club, Parry Sound

Teams entered:

- **Al Bourgeois** (Parry Sound)
- **Chris Wimmer** (Stroud)

Both teams qualify as there were no other entries.

==== Zone 11 ====
Paisley Curling Club, Paisley

Teams entered:

- **Cory Heggestad** (Markdale)
- **Jon St. Denis** (Markdale)

Both teams qualify as there were no other entries.

==== Zone 12 ====
Galt Curling Club, Cambridge

Teams entered:

- Mark Kean (Kitchener-Waterloo Granite)
- **Richard Krell** (Kitchener-Waterloo Granite)
- **Damien Villard** (Galt Country)

Brackets:

A side
**Krell**	**9**
Villard	6

A Final
**Krell**	**6**
Kean	5
B Final
Kean	6
**Villard**	**7**

==== Zone 13 ====
St. Catharines Curling Club, St. Catharines

Teams entered:

- **Bill Buchanan** (Welland)
- **Pat Ferris** (Grimsby)
- Simon Ouellet (Glendale)

Brackets:

A side
Ouellet	2
**Ferris**	**8**

A Final
**Buchanan**	**8**
Ferris	7
B Final
Ouellet	5
**Ferris**	**7**

==== Zone 14 ====
Palmerston Curling Club, Palmerston

Teams entered:

- Mike Benjamins (Palmerston)
- Ethan Doig (Seaforth)
- **Brent Ross** (Harriston)
- **Daryl Shane** (Wingham)

Brackets:

A side
Doig	3
**Ross**	**4**
**Shane**	**7**
Benjamins	5
B side
Benjamins	7
**Doig**	**10**

A Final
Ross	6
**Shane**	**7**
B Final
Doig	6
**Ross**	**7**

==== Zone 15 ====
Ingersoll & District Curling Club, Ingersoll

Teams entered:

- **Scott Bailey** (Ingersoll)
- Terry Corbin (Brant)
- **Wayne Tuck, Jr.** (Brant)

Brackets:

A side
**Tuck**	**7**
Corbin	1

A Final
Tuck	8
**Bailey**	**9**
B Final
Corbin	5
**Tuck**	**6**

==== Zone 16 ====
Glencoe & District Curling Club, Glencoe

Teams entered:

- **Mark Bice** (Sarnia)
- Don Bourques (Sarnia)
- Mike Drake (Kingsville)
- Dale Kelly (Chatham Granite)
- **Ryan LeDrew** (Sarnia)
- Kirk Massey (London)
- John Young (Chatham Granite)

Brackets:

A Side	Semifinal	**Final**
**Bice**	**6**
Young	2
**Young**	**10**
Bourques	5
**Bice**	**7**
Kelly	1
Massey	5
**Kelly**	**7**
**Kelly**	**9**
LeDrew	6
**LeDrew**	**7**
Drake	3
B side	Quarterfinal	Semifinal	Final
Massey	7
**Massey**	**12**	**Young**	**8**	Kelly	5
Drake	3	Young	9	**LeDrew**	**9**
**LeDrew**	**10**
**LeDrew**	**6**
Bourques	4

=== Regional qualification ===
==== Region 1 ====
Rideau Curling Club, Ottawa

A Side	Semifinal	**Final**
**Greg Balsdon**	**8**
Jason Reid	5
**Greg Balsdon**	**7**
Ryan McCrady	6
Willie Jeffries	12
**Ryan McCrady**	**7**
**Greg Balsdon**	**9**
Jake Higgs	5
**Jake Higgs**	**7**
J. P. Lachance	4
Colin Dow	1
Jake Higgs	**8**
**Colin Dow**	**7**
Dave Collyer	3
B side	Quarterfinal	Semifinal	Final
Colin Dow	5
**Willie Jeffries**	**8**	**Willie Jeffries**	**8**	**Jake Higgs**	**5**
Jason Reid	2	**Willie Jeffries**	**7**	Willie Jeffries	4
Ryan McCrady	6
**Ryan McCrady**	**9**
**Dave Collyer**	**12**	Dave Collyer	4
J. P. Lachance	5

==== Region 2 ====
Leaside Curling Club, East York

A Side	Semifinal	**Final**
**Glenn Howard**	**6**
Rob Houston	1
Glenn Howard	7
**Mike Harris**	**10**
Josh Johnston	1
**Mike Harris**	**8**
Michael Shepherd	5
**Mike Harris**	**7**
**Michael Shepherd**	**8**
Jake Walker	3
**Michael Shepherd**	**8**
Scott McDonald	2
John Bolton	4
**Scott McDonald**	**5**
B side	Quarterfinal	Semifinal	Final
**Scott McDonald**	**9**
Rob Houston	4	Josh Johnston	8	**Glenn Howard**	**7**
**Josh Johnston**	**8**	**Glenn Howard**	**7**	Michael Shepherd	4
Scott McDonald	3
**Glenn Howard**	**6**
**Jake Walker**	**6**	Jake Walker	5
John Bolton	4

==== Region 3 ====
Wiarton Curling Club, Wiarton

A Side	Semifinal	**Final**
Al Bourgeois	2
**Dayna Deruelle**	**5**
**Dayna Deruelle**	**5**
Ian Dickie	1
Jon St. Denis	4
**Ian Dickie**	**6**
**Dayna Deruelle**	**6**
Richard Krell	1
Damien Villard	1
**Cory Heggestad**	**7**
Cory Heggestad	3
Richard Krell	**8**
Chris Wimmer	5
**Richard Krell**	**6**
B side	Quarterfinal	Semifinal	Final
Cory Heggestad	5
Al Bourgeois	1	**Jon St. Denis**	**8**	Richard Krell	2
**Jon St. Denis**	**6**	Jon St. Denis	2	**Ian Dickie**	**5**
**Ian Dickie**	**3**
Damien Villard	4
**Damien Villard**	**12**	**Ian Dickie**	**9**
Chris Wimmer	4

==== Region 4 ====
Stratford Country Club, Stratford

A Side	Semifinal	**Final**
**Mark Bice**	**9**
Bill Buchanan	0
Pat Ferris	4
**Mark Bice**	**8**
**Pat Ferris**	**6**
Wayne Tuck, Jr.	4
Brent Ross	3
**Mark Bice**	**7**
**Brent Ross**	**9**
Daryl Shane	5
Scott Bailey	8
**Brent Ross**	**9**
Ryan LeDrew	1
**Scott Bailey**	**7**
B side	Quarterfinal	Semifinal	Final
**Scott Bailey**	**8**
Bill Buchanan	3	Wayne Tuck, Jr.	4	Brent Ross	5
**Wayne Tuck, Jr.**	**9**	**Scott Bailey**	**7**	**Scott Bailey**	**6**
Ryan LeDrew	4
**Ryan LeDrew**	**8**
**Ryan LeDrew**	**7**	Pat Ferris	3
Daryl Shane	5

=== Challenge Round ===
January 15–17 at the Penetanguishene Curling Club, Penetanguishene

New teams:

- Eric Bradey (St. Catharines)

Notes:

- Codey Maus skipping Scott McDonald rink.

A Side	Upper round 2	Upper round 3	**A Final**
Codey Maus	8
**Rob Retchless**	**9**	**Rob Retchless**	**9**
Rob Retchless	1
Ryan McCrady
**Pat Ferris**	**7**
Eric Bradey	2
Jake Walker	4	**Pat Ferris**	**5**
Pat Ferris	2
**Eric Bradey**	**9**
**Wayne Tuck, Jr.**	**8**
**Wayne Tuck, Jr.**	**8**
**Wayne Tuck, Jr.**	**6**	Mark Kean	7
**Wayne Tuck, Jr.**	**9**
Damien Villard	4
Jon St. Denis	4
**Jon St. Denis**	**7**
**Jon St. Denis**	**4**	Brent Ross	5
Ryan LeDrew	3
B side	Lower round 2	Lower round 3	Lower round 4	**Final**
Ryan McCrady	6
Jake Walker	7
**Mark Kean**	**7**
Mark Kean	4	**Rob Retchless**	**8**
**Jake Walker**	**8**	**Pat Ferris**	**7**
**Jake Walker**	**8**
**Rob Retchless**	**8**	Rob Retchless	6
Brent Ross	6
Ryan LeDrew	7
Damien Villard	3
**Ryan LeDrew**	**6**
**Codey Maus**	**7**
Codey Maus	4	Jon St. Denis	5
**Ryan LeDrew**	**10**
**Ryan LeDrew**	**6**
Eric Bradey	4
