= 2013 Canadian Olympic Curling Pre-Trials =

2013 Capital One Road to the Roar
- Host city: Kitchener, Ontario
- Arena: Kitchener Memorial Auditorium Complex
- Dates: November 5–10
- Attendance: 29,617
- Men's winner: (British Columbia) John Morris
- Curling club: Vernon CC, Vernon, BC
- Skip: John Morris
- Fourth: Jim Cotter
- Second: Tyrel Griffith
- Lead: Rick Sawatsky
- Alternate: Jason Gunnlaugson
- Coach: Pat Ryan
- Finalist: (Ontario) Brad Jacobs
- Women's winner: (Alberta) Renée Sonnenberg
- Curling club: Grande Prairie CC, Grande Prairie
- Skip: Renée Sonnenberg
- Third: Lawnie MacDonald
- Second: Cary-Anne McTaggart
- Lead: Rona Pasika
- Alternate: Desirée Owen
- Coach: Kurt Balderston
- Finalist: (Alberta) Val Sweeting

The qualification event for the 2013 Canadian Olympic Curling Trials (branded as the Capital One Road to the Roar for sponsorship reasons), was held from November 5 to 10 at the Kitchener Memorial Auditorium Complex in Kitchener, Ontario.

The top two finishers of the men's and women's events qualified to participate in the 2013 Canadian Olympic Curling Trials. The teams played in a triple-knockout tournament where four teams qualified for the playoff round. The first two qualifiers and the second two qualifiers played against each other, and the winner of the first game advanced to the Trials. The loser of the first game then played the winner of the second game to determine the second team that would advance to the Trials.

== Qualification ==
Twelve teams qualified for the pre-Trials based on the following criteria:

=== Men ===
Qualification method	Qualifying team	Scenario if team has already qualified
First on the 2010–11 CTRS	Brad Jacobs	Next team on the 2011–13 CTRS not already qualified
Second on the 2010–11 CTRS	Brad Gushue	Next team on the 2011–13 CTRS not already qualified
Third on the 2010–11 CTRS	Jim Cotter	Next team on the 2011–13 CTRS not already qualified
Fourth on the 2010–11 CTRS	Rob Fowler	Next team on the 2011–13 CTRS not already qualified
Second on the 2011–12 CTRS	Mark Kean	Next team on the 2012–13 CTRS not already qualified
Third on the 2011–12 CTRS	Steve Laycock	Next team on the 2012–13 CTRS not already qualified
Fourth on the 2011–12 CTRS	Joe Frans	Next team on the 2012–13 CTRS not already qualified
Second on the 2012–13 CTRS	Jean-Michel Ménard	Next team on the 2012–13 CTRS not already qualified
Third on the 2012–13 CTRS	Greg Balsdon	Next team on the 2012–13 CTRS not already qualified
Fourth on the 2012–13 CTRS	Bryan Cochrane	Next team on the 2012–13 CTRS not already qualified
Third on the 2011–13 CTRS (two year total)	Rob Rumfeldt	Next team on the 2011–13 CTRS not already qualified
Fourth on the 2011–13 CTRS (two year total)	Jake Higgs	Next team on the 2011–13 CTRS not already qualified

=== Women ===
Qualification method	Qualifying team	Scenario if team has already qualified
First on the 2010–11 CTRS	Shannon Kleibrink	Next team on the 2011–13 CTRS not already qualified
Second on the 2010–11 CTRS	Renée Sonnenberg	Next team on the 2011–13 CTRS not already qualified
Third on the 2010–11 CTRS	Cheryl Bernard	Next team on the 2011–13 CTRS not already qualified
Fourth on the 2010–11 CTRS	Crystal Webster	Next team on the 2011–13 CTRS not already qualified
Second on the 2011–12 CTRS	Laura Crocker	Next team on the 2012–13 CTRS not already qualified
Third on the 2011–12 CTRS	Amber Holland	Next team on the 2012–13 CTRS not already qualified
Fourth on the 2011–12 CTRS	Val Sweeting	Next team on the 2012–13 CTRS not already qualified
Second on the 2012–13 CTRS	Kelly Scott	Next team on the 2012–13 CTRS not already qualified
Third on the 2012–13 CTRS	Cathy Auld	Next team on the 2012–13 CTRS not already qualified
Fourth on the 2012–13 CTRS	Tracy Horgan	Next team on the 2012–13 CTRS not already qualified
Third on the 2011–13 CTRS (two year total)	Barb Spencer	Next team on the 2011–13 CTRS not already qualified
Fourth on the 2011–13 CTRS (two year total)	Krista McCarville	Next team on the 2011–13 CTRS not already qualified

== Men ==
=== Teams ===
The teams are listed as follows:

Skip	Third	Second	Lead	Alternate	Locale
Brad Jacobs	Ryan Fry	E. J. Harnden	Ryan Harnden		Sault Ste. Marie, Ontario
Brad Gushue	Brett Gallant	Adam Casey	Geoff Walker		St. John's, Newfoundland and Labrador
Jim Cotter (fourth)	John Morris (skip)	Tyrel Griffith	Rick Sawatsky	Jason Gunnlaugson	Vernon, British Columbia
Rob Fowler	Allan Lyburn	Brendan Taylor	Derek Samagalski		Brandon, Manitoba
Mark Kean	Travis Fanset	Patrick Janssen	Tim March	Colin Hodgson	Toronto, Ontario
Steve Laycock	Kirk Muyres	Colton Flasch	Dallan Muyres		Saskatoon, Saskatchewan
Joe Frans	Ryan Werenich	Jeff Gorda	Shawn Kaufman	Darryl Prebble	Bradford, Ontario
Jean-Michel Ménard	Martin Crête	Éric Sylvain	Philippe Ménard	Pierre Charette	Saint-Romuald, Quebec
Greg Balsdon	Mark Bice	Tyler Morgan	Steve Bice	Jamie Farnell	Toronto, Ontario
Mathew Camm (fourth)	Chris Gardner	Brad Kidd	Bryan Cochrane (skip)	Mike Anderson	Ottawa, Ontario
Rob Rumfeldt	Adam Spencer	Scott Howard	Scott Hodgson	Greg Robinson	Guelph, Ontario
Jake Higgs	Brent Ross	Codey Maus	Bill Buchanan	Aaron Squires	Harriston, Ontario

=== Knockout Draw Brackets ===
The draw is listed as follows:

==== A event ====
First Knockout
(Ontario) Greg Balsdon	7
(Manitoba) Rob Fowler	4
(Saskatchewan) Steve Laycock	5
(Ontario) Rob Rumfeldt	12
7	(Quebec) Jean-Michel Ménard	10
10	(Ontario) Bryan Cochrane	4
6	(Ontario) Joe Frans	3
11	(Ontario) Jake Higgs	9

Quarterfinals
8	(Ontario) Greg Balsdon	10
1	(Ontario) Brad Jacobs	9
12	(Ontario) Rob Rumfeldt	2
4	(British Columbia) John Morris	10
7	(Quebec) Jean-Michel Ménard	5
2	(Newfoundland and Labrador) Brad Gushue	9
11	(Ontario) Jake Higgs	6
3	(Ontario) Mark Kean	4

Semifinals
8	(Ontario) Greg Balsdon	5
4	(British Columbia) John Morris	10
2	(Newfoundland and Labrador) Brad Gushue	10
11	(Ontario) Jake Higgs	4

To Qualifier 1
4	(British Columbia) John Morris	8
2	(Newfoundland and Labrador) Brad Gushue	3

==== B event ====
Second Knockout
(Manitoba) Rob Fowler	4
(Saskatchewan) Steve Laycock	6
(Ontario) Bryan Cochrane	4
(Ontario) Joe Frans	9
1	(Ontario) Brad Jacobs	7
12	(Ontario) Rob Rumfeldt	4
7	(Quebec) Jean-Michel Ménard	5
3	(Ontario) Mark Kean	10

Quarterfinals
11	(Ontario) Jake Higgs	3
5	(Saskatchewan) Steve Laycock	6
8	(Ontario) Greg Balsdon	8
6	(Ontario) Joe Frans	4
1	(Ontario) Brad Jacobs	8
3	(Ontario) Mark Kean	7

Semifinals
5	(Saskatchewan) Steve Laycock	7
8	(Ontario) Greg Balsdon	6
2	(Newfoundland and Labrador) Brad Gushue	3
1	(Ontario) Brad Jacobs	9

To Qualifier 1
5	(Saskatchewan) Steve Laycock	6
1	(Ontario) Brad Jacobs	9

==== C event ====
Third Knockout			Semifinals			To Playoff Game
9	(Manitoba) Rob Fowler	6
10	(Ontario) Bryan Cochrane	4	9	(Manitoba) Rob Fowler	6
12	(Ontario) Rob Rumfeldt	3	7	(Quebec) Jean-Michel Ménard	4
7	(Quebec) Jean-Michel Ménard	5				9	(Manitoba) Rob Fowler	4
						5	(Saskatchewan) Steve Laycock	5

Third Knockout
11	(Ontario) Jake Higgs	8
6	(Ontario) Joe Frans	7

Semifinals
11	(Ontario) Jake Higgs	4
2	(Newfoundland and Labrador) Brad Gushue	11
8	(Ontario) Greg Balsdon	9
3	(Ontario) Mark Kean	7

To Playoff Game
2	(Newfoundland and Labrador) Brad Gushue	10
8	(Ontario) Greg Balsdon	4

=== Knockout results ===
All draw times are listed in Eastern Standard Time (UTC−5).

==== Draw 1 ====
Tuesday, November 5, 9:00 am

Sheet 1	1	2	3	4	5	6	7	8	9	10	Final
(Ontario) Greg Balsdon 🔨	0	0	2	0	0	2	0	0	3	X	7
(Manitoba) Rob Fowler	0	1	0	0	1	0	1	1	0	X	4

Sheet 2	1	2	3	4	5	6	7	8	9	10	Final
(Saskatchewan) Steve Laycock	0	1	0	2	0	0	2	0	X	X	5
(Ontario) Rob Rumfeldt 🔨	3	0	3	0	1	1	0	4	X	X	12

Sheet 3	1	2	3	4	5	6	7	8	9	10	Final
(Quebec) Jean-Michel Ménard	0	2	0	3	0	1	0	1	3	X	10
(Ontario) Bryan Cochrane 🔨	1	0	2	0	1	0	0	0	0	X	4

Sheet 4	1	2	3	4	5	6	7	8	9	10	Final
(Ontario) Joe Frans	0	0	1	0	2	0	0	0	X	X	3
(Ontario) Jake Higgs 🔨	2	1	0	2	0	1	2	1	X	X	9

==== Draw 2 ====
Tuesday, November 5, 7:30 pm

Sheet 1	1	2	3	4	5	6	7	8	9	10	Final
(Ontario) Jake Higgs 🔨	0	0	1	0	2	0	1	0	1	1	6
(Ontario) Mark Kean	0	1	0	1	0	1	0	1	0	0	4

Sheet 2	1	2	3	4	5	6	7	8	9	10	Final
(Ontario) Greg Balsdon 🔨	2	0	1	0	0	0	3	1	0	3	10
(Ontario) Brad Jacobs	0	2	0	3	1	2	0	0	1	0	9

Sheet 4	1	2	3	4	5	6	7	8	9	10	Final
(Quebec) Jean-Michel Ménard 🔨	0	0	0	1	0	2	0	2	0	X	5
(Newfoundland and Labrador) Brad Gushue	1	3	1	0	0	0	3	0	1	X	9

Sheet 5	1	2	3	4	5	6	7	8	9	10	Final
(Ontario) Rob Rumfeldt	0	0	0	1	0	1	0	0	X	X	2
(British Columbia) John Morris 🔨	1	1	2	0	1	0	1	4	X	X	10

==== Draw 3 ====
Wednesday, November 6, 2:00 pm

Sheet 1	1	2	3	4	5	6	7	8	9	10	Final
(Ontario) Bryan Cochrane	0	1	0	0	2	0	0	1	X	X	4
(Ontario) Joe Frans 🔨	3	0	1	0	0	4	1	0	X	X	9

Sheet 2	1	2	3	4	5	6	7	8	9	10	Final
(Quebec) Jean-Michel Ménard 🔨	1	0	2	0	1	0	0	1	0	X	5
(Ontario) Mark Kean	0	2	0	2	0	2	1	0	3	X	10

Sheet 3	1	2	3	4	5	6	7	8	9	10	Final
(Ontario) Brad Jacobs 🔨	2	1	0	0	0	2	0	2	0	X	7
(Ontario) Rob Rumfeldt	0	0	0	1	1	0	1	0	1	X	4

Sheet 5	1	2	3	4	5	6	7	8	9	10	Final
(Manitoba) Rob Fowler	0	0	2	0	0	0	0	0	2	0	4
(Saskatchewan) Steve Laycock 🔨	0	2	0	0	1	2	0	0	0	1	6

==== Draw 4 ====
Wednesday, November 6, 7:00 pm

Sheet 4	1	2	3	4	5	6	7	8	9	10	Final
(Ontario) Greg Balsdon 🔨	3	0	1	0	1	0	0	0	0	X	5
(British Columbia) John Morris	0	1	0	2	0	2	1	2	2	X	10

Sheet 5	1	2	3	4	5	6	7	8	9	10	Final
(Newfoundland and Labrador) Brad Gushue 🔨	0	4	0	1	3	2	0	0	X	X	10
(Ontario) Jake Higgs	1	0	1	0	0	0	0	2	X	X	4

==== Draw 5 ====
Thursday, November 7, 9:00 am

Sheet 4	1	2	3	4	5	6	7	8	9	10	Final
(Ontario) Jake Higgs	0	1	1	0	0	0	0	0	1	0	3
(Saskatchewan) Steve Laycock 🔨	0	0	0	1	1	0	1	0	0	3	6

==== Draw 6 ====
Thursday, November 7, 2:00 pm

Sheet 3	1	2	3	4	5	6	7	8	9	10	Final
(Ontario) Greg Balsdon	0	2	1	0	2	0	2	0	1	X	8
(Ontario) Joe Frans 🔨	1	0	0	1	0	1	0	1	0	X	4

Sheet 4	1	2	3	4	5	6	7	8	9	10	11	Final
(Ontario) Brad Jacobs 🔨	0	2	0	1	0	2	0	1	1	0	1	8
(Ontario) Mark Kean	0	0	2	0	2	0	2	0	0	1	0	7

==== Draw 7 ====
Thursday, November 7, 7:00 pm

Sheet 3	1	2	3	4	5	6	7	8	9	10	Final
(British Columbia) John Morris 🔨	0	2	0	1	0	0	2	2	1	X	8
(Newfoundland and Labrador) Brad Gushue	1	0	1	0	1	0	0	0	0	X	3

==== Draw 8 ====
Friday, November 8, 9:00 am

Sheet 1	1	2	3	4	5	6	7	8	9	10	Final
(Ontario) Rob Rumfeldt	0	0	0	1	0	1	1	0	0	X	3
(Quebec) Jean-Michel Ménard 🔨	0	1	0	0	2	0	0	1	1	X	5

Sheet 4	1	2	3	4	5	6	7	8	9	10	Final
(Manitoba) Rob Fowler 🔨	2	1	0	0	0	1	0	1	0	1	6
(Ontario) Bryan Cochrane	0	0	0	0	2	0	1	0	1	0	4

Sheet 5	1	2	3	4	5	6	7	8	9	10	Final
(Saskatchewan) Steve Laycock 🔨	1	0	1	0	2	0	1	0	1	1	7
(Ontario) Greg Balsdon	0	1	0	1	0	2	0	2	0	0	6

==== Draw 9 ====
Friday, November 8, 2:00 pm

Sheet 1	1	2	3	4	5	6	7	8	9	10	Final
(Newfoundland and Labrador) Brad Gushue	0	0	1	0	0	1	0	1	0	X	3
(Ontario) Brad Jacobs 🔨	0	2	0	0	1	0	2	0	4	X	9

==== Draw 10 ====
Friday, November 8, 7:00 pm

Sheet 3	1	2	3	4	5	6	7	8	9	10	Final
(Saskatchewan) Steve Laycock 🔨	1	0	0	1	0	2	0	2	0	0	6
(Ontario) Brad Jacobs	0	0	1	0	3	0	1	0	2	2	9

Sheet 5	1	2	3	4	5	6	7	8	9	10	11	Final
(Ontario) Jake Higgs	0	1	2	1	0	1	0	2	0	0	1	8
(Ontario) Joe Frans 🔨	3	0	0	0	1	0	0	0	2	1	0	7

==== Draw 11 ====
Saturday, November 9, 9:00 am

Sheet 1	1	2	3	4	5	6	7	8	9	10	Final
(Ontario) Mark Kean	0	2	0	2	0	0	1	0	2	0	7
(Ontario) Greg Balsdon 🔨	2	0	1	0	3	0	0	1	0	2	9

Sheet 2	1	2	3	4	5	6	7	8	9	10	Final
(Newfoundland and Labrador) Brad Gushue 🔨	0	3	2	0	4	0	2	0	X	X	11
(Ontario) Jake Higgs	0	0	0	1	0	2	0	1	X	X	4

Sheet 5	1	2	3	4	5	6	7	8	9	10	Final
(Quebec) Jean-Michel Ménard 🔨	1	0	1	0	0	1	0	0	1	0	4
(Manitoba) Rob Fowler	0	0	0	2	0	0	0	3	0	1	6

==== Draw 12 ====
Saturday, November 9, 2:00 pm

Sheet 1	1	2	3	4	5	6	7	8	9	10	Final
(Saskatchewan) Steve Laycock 🔨	0	1	0	0	0	1	1	1	0	1	5
(Manitoba) Rob Fowler	0	0	0	2	0	0	0	0	2	0	4

Sheet 2	1	2	3	4	5	6	7	8	9	10	Final
(Newfoundland and Labrador) Brad Gushue 🔨	0	4	0	2	0	1	0	1	2	X	10
(Ontario) Greg Balsdon	0	0	2	0	1	0	1	0	0	X	4

=== Playoffs ===
Qualifier 1
A	(British Columbia) John Morris	5
B	(Ontario) Brad Jacobs	4

Playoff Game			Qualifier 2
C1	(Saskatchewan) Steve Laycock	3
C2	(Newfoundland and Labrador) Brad Gushue	5	C2	(Newfoundland and Labrador) Brad Gushue	5
			B	(Ontario) Brad Jacobs	7

==== Qualifier 1 ====
Saturday, November 9, 2:00 pm

Sheet 3	1	2	3	4	5	6	7	8	9	10	Final
(British Columbia) John Morris 🔨	0	1	0	0	1	1	0	1	0	1	5
(Ontario) Brad Jacobs	0	0	1	1	0	0	1	0	1	0	4

==== Playoff Game ====
Sunday, November 10, 9:00 am

Sheet 3	1	2	3	4	5	6	7	8	9	10	Final
(Saskatchewan) Steve Laycock	0	0	0	1	0	0	0	1	1	0	3
(Newfoundland and Labrador) Brad Gushue 🔨	0	1	1	0	1	1	0	0	0	1	5

==== Qualifier 2 ====
Sunday, November 10, 7:00 pm

Sheet 3	1	2	3	4	5	6	7	8	9	10	Final
(Newfoundland and Labrador) Brad Gushue	0	1	1	1	0	0	1	0	1	0	5
(Ontario) Brad Jacobs 🔨	2	0	0	0	3	0	0	1	0	1	7

== Women ==
=== Teams ===
The teams are listed as follows:

Skip	Third	Second	Lead	Alternate	Locale
Shannon Kleibrink	Bronwen Webster	Kalynn Park	Chelsey Matson		Calgary, Alberta
Amber Holland	Jolene Campbell	Dailene Sivertson	Brooklyn Lemon	Candace Chisholm	Regina, Saskatchewan
Renée Sonnenberg	Lawnie MacDonald	Cary-Anne McTaggart	Rona Pasika	Desirée Owen	Grande Prairie, Alberta
Cheryl Bernard	Susan O'Connor	Lori Olson-Johns	Shannon Aleksic	Carolyn Darbyshire	Calgary, Alberta
Laura Crocker	Erin Carmody	Rebecca Pattison	Jen Gates		Edmonton, Alberta
Crystal Webster	Cathy Overton-Clapham	Geri-Lynn Ramsay	Samantha Preston		Calgary, Alberta
Val Sweeting	Joanne Courtney	Dana Ferguson	Rachelle Pidherny		Edmonton, Alberta
Kelly Scott	Jeanna Schraeder	Sasha Carter	Sarah Wazney		Kelowna, British Columbia
Cathy Auld	Janet Murphy	Stephanie Matheson	Melissa Foster	Clancy Grandy	Mississauga, Ontario
Tracy Horgan	Jenn Horgan	Jenna Enge	Amanda Gates	Kendra Lilly	Sudbury, Ontario
Barb Spencer	Katie Spencer	Jenna Loder	Raunora Westcott		Winnipeg, Manitoba
Krista McCarville	Ashley Miharija	Kari Lavoie	Sarah Potts	Tirzah Keffer	Thunder Bay, Ontario

=== Knockout Draw Brackets ===
The draw is listed as follows:

==== A event ====
First Knockout
(British Columbia) Kelly Scott	6
(Ontario) Cathy Auld	5
(Alberta) Crystal Webster	8
(Ontario) Krista McCarville	9
7	(Alberta) Val Sweeting	3
10	(Ontario) Tracy Horgan	8
6	(Saskatchewan) Amber Holland	5
11	(Manitoba) Barb Spencer	8

Quarterfinals
8	(British Columbia) Kelly Scott	6
1	(Alberta) Shannon Kleibrink	5
12	(Ontario) Krista McCarville	6
4	(Alberta) Cheryl Bernard	5
10	(Ontario) Tracy Horgan	6
2	(Alberta) Laura Crocker	10
11	(Manitoba) Barb Spencer	4
3	(Alberta) Renée Sonnenberg	9

Semifinals
8	(British Columbia) Kelly Scott	6
12	(Ontario) Krista McCarville	5
2	(Alberta) Laura Crocker	4
3	(Alberta) Renée Sonnenberg	9

To Qualifier 1
8	(British Columbia) Kelly Scott	8
3	(Alberta) Renée Sonnenberg	5

==== B event ====
Second Knockout
(Alberta) Crystal Webster	3
(Ontario) Cathy Auld	9
(Alberta) Val Sweeting	8
(Saskatchewan) Amber Holland	3
1	(Alberta) Shannon Kleibrink	6
4	(Alberta) Cheryl Bernard	5
10	(Ontario) Tracy Horgan	12
11	(Manitoba) Barb Spencer	7

Quarterfinals
2	(Alberta) Laura Crocker	6
9	(Ontario) Cathy Auld	7
12	(Ontario) Krista McCarville	7
7	(Alberta) Val Sweeting	8
1	(Alberta) Shannon Kleibrink	7
10	(Ontario) Tracy Horgan	10

Semifinals
9	(Ontario) Cathy Auld	7
7	(Alberta) Val Sweeting	6
3	(Alberta) Renée Sonnenberg	7
10	(Ontario) Tracy Horgan	6

To Qualifier 1
9	(Ontario) Cathy Auld	7
3	(Alberta) Renée Sonnenberg	10

==== C event ====
Third Knockout			Semifinals			To Playoff Game
5	(Alberta) Crystal Webster	8
6	(Saskatchewan) Amber Holland	5	5	(Alberta) Crystal Webster	3
4	(Alberta) Cheryl Bernard	11	4	(Alberta) Cheryl Bernard	5
11	(Manitoba) Barb Spencer	5				4	(Alberta) Cheryl Bernard	10
						9	(Ontario) Cathy Auld	8

Third Knockout
2	(Alberta) Laura Crocker	10
12	(Ontario) Krista McCarville	3

Semifinals
2	(Alberta) Laura Crocker	5
10	(Ontario) Tracy Horgan	7
7	(Alberta) Val Sweeting	8
1	(Alberta) Shannon Kleibrink	3

To Playoff Game
10	(Ontario) Tracy Horgan	3
7	(Alberta) Val Sweeting	5

=== Knockout results ===
All draw times are listed in Eastern Standard Time (UTC−5).

==== Draw 1 ====
Tuesday, November 5, 1:00 pm

Sheet 1	1	2	3	4	5	6	7	8	9	10	11	Final
(Alberta) Crystal Webster 🔨	0	0	0	0	2	0	1	2	0	3	0	8
(Ontario) Krista McCarville	0	1	1	2	0	1	0	0	3	0	1	9

Sheet 2	1	2	3	4	5	6	7	8	9	10	Final
(British Columbia) Kelly Scott 🔨	0	1	0	0	0	2	1	0	0	2	6
(Ontario) Cathy Auld	0	0	1	1	1	0	0	2	0	0	5

Sheet 4	1	2	3	4	5	6	7	8	9	10	Final
(Alberta) Val Sweeting	0	1	0	1	0	1	0	0	0	X	3
(Ontario) Tracy Horgan 🔨	1	0	1	0	1	0	1	3	1	X	8

Sheet 5	1	2	3	4	5	6	7	8	9	10	Final
(Saskatchewan) Amber Holland 🔨	0	0	1	0	0	1	2	0	1	X	5
(Manitoba) Barb Spencer	2	1	0	1	2	0	0	2	0	X	8

==== Draw 2 ====
Tuesday, November 5, 7:30 pm

Sheet 3	1	2	3	4	5	6	7	8	9	10	Final
(Alberta) Val Sweeting	0	0	1	2	0	0	3	2	X	X	8
(Saskatchewan) Amber Holland 🔨	0	1	0	0	1	1	0	0	X	X	3

==== Draw 3 ====
Wednesday, November 6, 9:00 am

Sheet 1	1	2	3	4	5	6	7	8	9	10	Final
(British Columbia) Kelly Scott	0	0	1	0	2	1	0	1	0	1	6
(Alberta) Shannon Kleibrink 🔨	1	0	0	1	0	0	2	0	1	0	5

Sheet 2	1	2	3	4	5	6	7	8	9	10	Final
(Ontario) Krista McCarville 🔨	1	1	1	1	0	0	2	0	0	0	6
(Alberta) Cheryl Bernard	0	0	0	0	0	1	0	2	1	1	5

Sheet 3	1	2	3	4	5	6	7	8	9	10	11	Final
(Ontario) Tracy Horgan 🔨	0	1	1	1	0	1	0	2	0	0	0	6
(Alberta) Laura Crocker	0	0	0	0	2	0	1	0	1	2	4	10

Sheet 4	1	2	3	4	5	6	7	8	9	10	Final
(Manitoba) Barb Spencer 🔨	0	0	1	0	2	1	0	0	0	X	4
(Alberta) Renée Sonnenberg	0	0	0	2	0	0	3	2	2	X	9

Sheet 5	1	2	3	4	5	6	7	8	9	10	Final
(Alberta) Crystal Webster	1	0	2	0	0	0	0	0	X	X	3
(Ontario) Cathy Auld 🔨	0	1	0	3	2	1	1	1	X	X	9

==== Draw 4 ====
Wednesday, November 6, 2:00 pm

Sheet 1	1	2	3	4	5	6	7	8	9	10	Final
(Alberta) Shannon Kleibrink	0	1	0	1	0	2	1	0	0	1	6
(Alberta) Cheryl Bernard 🔨	1	0	1	0	2	0	0	1	0	0	5

==== Draw 5 ====
Wednesday, November 6, 7:00 pm

Sheet 1	1	2	3	4	5	6	7	8	9	10	Final
(Ontario) Tracy Horgan 🔨	1	0	1	1	0	4	0	1	1	3	12
(Manitoba) Barb Spencer	0	1	0	0	4	0	2	0	0	0	7

Sheet 2	1	2	3	4	5	6	7	8	9	10	Final
(Alberta) Laura Crocker	0	1	0	0	1	2	0	0	0	0	4
(Alberta) Renée Sonnenberg 🔨	1	0	2	1	0	0	0	1	1	3	9

Sheet 3	1	2	3	4	5	6	7	8	9	10	Final
(British Columbia) Kelly Scott	0	0	2	0	1	1	1	0	0	1	6
(Ontario) Krista McCarville 🔨	0	1	0	1	0	0	0	1	2	0	5

==== Draw 6 ====
Thursday, November 7, 9:00 am

Sheet 1	1	2	3	4	5	6	7	8	9	10	Final
(Ontario) Krista McCarville 🔨	1	0	1	0	2	0	2	0	1	0	7
(Alberta) Val Sweeting	0	2	0	2	0	2	0	1	0	1	8

Sheet 2	1	2	3	4	5	6	7	8	9	10	Final
(Alberta) Crystal Webster 🔨	0	2	0	2	1	2	0	1	0	X	8
(Saskatchewan) Amber Holland	0	0	2	0	0	0	2	0	1	X	5

Sheet 3	1	2	3	4	5	6	7	8	9	10	Final
(Alberta) Shannon Kleibrink	1	0	0	2	0	2	0	1	1	0	7
(Ontario) Tracy Horgan 🔨	0	3	3	0	2	0	1	0	0	1	10

==== Draw 7 ====
Thursday, November 7, 2:00 pm

Sheet 1	1	2	3	4	5	6	7	8	9	10	11	Final
(Alberta) Laura Crocker	0	0	0	3	0	2	0	1	0	0	0	6
(Ontario) Cathy Auld 🔨	0	1	1	0	1	0	1	0	1	1	1	7

Sheet 5	1	2	3	4	5	6	7	8	9	10	Final
(British Columbia) Kelly Scott 🔨	0	1	0	2	0	1	2	0	0	2	8
(Alberta) Renée Sonnenberg	0	0	1	0	2	0	0	2	0	0	5

==== Draw 8 ====
Thursday, November 7, 7:00 pm

Sheet 1	1	2	3	4	5	6	7	8	9	10	Final
(Alberta) Renée Sonnenberg 🔨	0	1	0	3	0	0	0	1	0	2	7
(Ontario) Tracy Horgan	0	0	2	0	1	1	1	0	1	0	6

Sheet 2	1	2	3	4	5	6	7	8	9	10	Final
(Alberta) Cheryl Bernard 🔨	0	3	0	2	1	0	2	0	3	x	11
(Manitoba) Barb Spencer	0	0	2	0	0	1	0	2	0	x	5

Sheet 4	1	2	3	4	5	6	7	8	9	10	Final
(Ontario) Cathy Auld	0	0	1	0	2	2	0	1	0	1	7
(Alberta) Val Sweeting 🔨	1	1	0	1	0	0	1	0	2	0	6

Sheet 5	1	2	3	4	5	6	7	8	9	10	Final
(Alberta) Laura Crocker	1	0	2	0	0	2	5	0	x	x	10
(Ontario) Krista McCarville 🔨	0	0	0	1	1	0	0	1	x	x	3

==== Draw 9 ====
Friday, November 8, 9:00 am

Sheet 3	1	2	3	4	5	6	7	8	9	10	Final
(Ontario) Cathy Auld 🔨	1	1	0	2	2	0	1	0	0	0	7
(Alberta) Renée Sonnenberg	0	0	3	0	0	1	0	2	2	2	10

==== Draw 10 ====
Friday, November 8, 2:00 pm

Sheet 2	1	2	3	4	5	6	7	8	9	10	Final
(Alberta) Val Sweeting 🔨	0	2	3	0	1	0	1	0	1	X	8
(Alberta) Shannon Kleibrink	0	0	0	1	0	1	0	1	0	X	3

Sheet 3	1	2	3	4	5	6	7	8	9	10	Final
(Ontario) Tracy Horgan	0	3	0	0	1	1	0	1	0	1	7
(Alberta) Laura Crocker 🔨	0	0	2	0	0	0	2	0	1	0	5

Sheet 5	1	2	3	4	5	6	7	8	9	10	Final
(Alberta) Crystal Webster	0	0	1	0	0	0	0	2	0	0	3
(Alberta) Cheryl Bernard 🔨	0	1	0	1	1	0	0	0	1	1	5

==== Draw 11 ====
Friday, November 8, 7:00 pm

Sheet 2	1	2	3	4	5	6	7	8	9	10	11	Final
(Ontario) Cathy Auld	1	0	1	0	2	1	0	2	1	0	0	8
(Alberta) Cheryl Bernard 🔨	0	2	0	3	0	0	1	0	0	2	2	10

Sheet 4	1	2	3	4	5	6	7	8	9	10	Final
(Ontario) Tracy Horgan 🔨	0	0	0	1	0	1	0	1	0	0	3
(Alberta) Val Sweeting	0	0	0	0	1	0	3	0	0	1	5

=== Playoffs ===
Qualifier 1
A	(British Columbia) Kelly Scott	4
B	(Alberta) Renée Sonnenberg	12

Playoff Game			Qualifier 2
C1	(Alberta) Cheryl Bernard	7
C2	(Alberta) Val Sweeting	9	C2	(Alberta) Val Sweeting	6
			A	(British Columbia) Kelly Scott	4

==== Playoff Game ====
Saturday, November 9, 9:00 am

Sheet 3	1	2	3	4	5	6	7	8	9	10	Final
(Alberta) Cheryl Bernard	0	2	0	1	0	0	2	2	0	0	7
(Alberta) Val Sweeting 🔨	1	0	2	0	1	1	0	0	2	2	9

==== Qualifier 1 ====
Saturday, November 9, 7:00 pm

Sheet 3	1	2	3	4	5	6	7	8	9	10	Final
(British Columbia) Kelly Scott 🔨	0	1	1	0	1	0	1	0	0	X	4
(Alberta) Renée Sonnenberg	1	0	0	2	0	4	0	3	2	X	12

==== Qualifier 2 ====
Sunday, November 10, 2:00 pm

Sheet 3	1	2	3	4	5	6	7	8	9	10	Final
(Alberta) Val Sweeting	0	0	0	1	1	3	0	0	0	1	6
(British Columbia) Kelly Scott 🔨	1	1	0	0	0	0	1	0	1	0	4
