= 2012 The Masters Grand Slam of Curling – Men's event =

2012 The Masters Grand Slam of Curling Men's event
- Host city: Brantford, Ontario; Paris, Ontario
- Arena: Wayne Gretzky Sports Centre; Brantford Golf & Curling Club; Brant Curling Club
- Dates: November 14–18
- Winner: (Alberta) Kevin Koe
- Curling club: Glencoe CC, Calgary
- Skip: Kevin Koe
- Third: Pat Simmons
- Second: Carter Rycroft
- Lead: Nolan Thiessen
- Finalist: (British Columbia) Jim Cotter

The men's event of the 2012 Masters Grand Slam of Curling was held from November 14 to 18 at the Wayne Gretzky Sports Centre, the Brantford Golf & Curling Club and the Brant Curling Club in Brantford, Ontario as part of the 2012–13 World Curling Tour. Some of the men's Tier I round robin games were held at the Brantford Golf & Curling Club, while the remainder of the Tier I games and the playoffs round games were held at the Wayne Gretzky Sports Centre. The men's Tier II games and playoffs qualifiers were held at the Brant Curling Club. It was held as the first Grand Slam event on the men's tour.

In the final, Kevin Koe of Alberta defeated Jim Cotter of British Columbia with a score of 7–5.

The event is split up into two tiers, with 18 teams in Tier I and 16 teams in Tier II. The Tier I teams were divided into 3 pools of 6 teams which played in a round robin, while the Tier II teams played off in a triple knockout event. 8 Tier II teams qualified for a playoff to determine which two teams would enter the playoffs along with six Tier I teams.

== Tier I ==
=== Teams ===
The teams are listed as follows:

Skip	Third	Second	Lead	Locale
Jim Cotter	Jason Gunnlaugson	Tyrel Griffith	Rick Sawatsky	Kelowna/Vernon, British Columbia
Benoît Schwarz (fourth)	Peter de Cruz (skip)	Dominik Märki	Valentin Tanner	Switzerland
Niklas Edin	Sebastian Kraupp	Fredrik Lindberg	Viktor Kjäll	Karlstad, Sweden
John Epping	Scott Bailey	Scott Howard	David Mathers	Toronto, Ontario
Rob Fowler	Allan Lyburn	Richard Daneault	Derek Samagalski	Brandon, Manitoba
Brad Gushue	Adam Casey	Brett Gallant	Geoff Walker	St. John's, Newfoundland and Labrador
Glenn Howard	Wayne Middaugh	Brent Laing	Craig Savill	Coldwater, Ontario
Brad Jacobs	Ryan Fry	E. J. Harnden	Ryan Harnden	Sault Ste. Marie, Ontario
Mark Kean	Travis Fanset	Patrick Janssen	Tim March	Toronto, Ontario
Kevin Koe	Pat Simmons	Carter Rycroft	Nolan Thiessen	Edmonton, Alberta
Kevin Martin	John Morris	Marc Kennedy	Ben Hebert	Edmonton, Alberta
Mike McEwen	B.J. Neufeld	Matt Wozniak	Denni Neufeld	Winnipeg, Manitoba
Jean-Michel Ménard	Martin Crête	Éric Sylvain	Philippe Ménard	Quebec City, Quebec
Sven Michel	Claudio Pätz	Sandro Trolliet	Simon Gempeler	Adelboden, Switzerland
Robert Rumfeldt	Adam Spencer	Scott Hodgson	Greg Robinson	Guelph, Ontario
Jeff Stoughton	Jon Mead	Reid Carruthers	Mark Nichols	Winnipeg, Manitoba
Charley Thomas	J. D. Lind	Dominic Daemen	Matthew Ng	Calgary, Alberta
Thomas Ulsrud	Torger Nergård	Christoffer Svae	Håvard Vad Petersson	Oslo, Norway

=== Round-robin standings ===
Final round-robin standings

Key
Teams to Playoffs
Teams to Tiebreakers

Pool A	W	L
(Alberta) Kevin Koe	3	2
(Switzerland) Peter de Cruz	3	2
(Manitoba) Jeff Stoughton	3	2
(Manitoba) Rob Fowler	2	3
(Ontario) Glenn Howard	2	3
(Ontario) Robert Rumfeldt	1	4

Pool B	W	L
(Ontario) Brad Jacobs	5	0
(British Columbia) Jim Cotter	3	2
(Manitoba) Mike McEwen	3	2
(Sweden) Niklas Edin	2	3
(Newfoundland and Labrador) Brad Gushue	2	3
(Ontario) Mark Kean	0	5

Pool C	W	L
(Alberta) Kevin Martin	4	1
(Quebec) Jean-Michel Ménard	3	2
(Denmark) Rasmus Stjerne	3	2
(Norway) Thomas Ulsrud	3	2
(Ontario) John Epping	2	3
(Switzerland) Sven Michel	0	5

=== Round-robin results ===
All draw times are listed in Eastern Standard Time.

==== Draw 1 ====
Wednesday, November 14, 19:00

Sheet A	1	2	3	4	5	6	7	8	Final
(Manitoba) Rob Fowler	1	1	0	0	2	1	0	X	5
(Switzerland) Peter de Cruz	0	0	2	0	0	0	0	X	2

Sheet B	1	2	3	4	5	6	7	8	Final
(Alberta) Kevin Martin	2	0	2	0	2	0	0	2	8
(Quebec) Jean-Michel Ménard	0	1	0	1	0	3	1	0	6

Sheet C	1	2	3	4	5	6	7	8	Final
(Norway) Thomas Ulsrud	1	0	0	1	0	1	0	0	3
(Denmark) Rasmus Stjerne	0	0	0	0	0	0	1	1	2

Sheet D	1	2	3	4	5	6	7	8	Final
(Ontario) John Epping	0	3	0	0	4	X	X	X	7
(Switzerland) Sven Michel	0	0	0	2	0	X	X	X	2

Sheet E	1	2	3	4	5	6	7	8	Final
(Manitoba) Jeff Stoughton	2	0	0	3	1	0	0	X	6
(Ontario) Robert Rumfeldt	0	0	2	0	0	1	1	X	4

Sheet B	1	2	3	4	5	6	7	8	Final
(Manitoba) Mike McEwen	0	5	1	X	X	X	X	X	6
(Ontario) Mark Kean	1	0	0	X	X	X	X	X	1

Sheet C	1	2	3	4	5	6	7	8	Final
(Sweden) Niklas Edin	0	0	1	0	1	0	2	0	4
(Newfoundland and Labrador) Brad Gushue	1	1	0	1	0	2	0	1	5

Sheet D	1	2	3	4	5	6	7	8	Final
(Ontario) Brad Jacobs	1	2	1	1	0	0	1	X	6
(British Columbia) Jim Cotter	0	0	0	0	1	1	0	X	2

==== Draw 2 ====
Thursday, November 14, 8:30

Sheet A	1	2	3	4	5	6	7	8	Final
(Sweden) Niklas Edin	0	3	1	2	0	0	X	X	6
(Ontario) Mark Kean	0	0	0	0	0	2	X	X	2

Sheet B	1	2	3	4	5	6	7	8	9	Final
(Newfoundland and Labrador) Brad Gushue	0	1	0	0	1	0	1	0	0	3
(Ontario) Brad Jacobs	1	0	0	0	0	1	0	1	2	5

Sheet C	1	2	3	4	5	6	7	8	Final
(Alberta) Kevin Koe	2	0	0	1	0	0	0	1	4
(Ontario) Robert Rumfeldt	0	1	0	0	1	0	0	0	2

Sheet D	1	2	3	4	5	6	7	8	Final
(Ontario) Glenn Howard	0	1	0	1	0	0	X	X	2
(Switzerland) Peter de Cruz	3	0	2	0	1	0	X	X	6

Sheet E	1	2	3	4	5	6	7	8	Final
(Manitoba) Mike McEwen	2	0	0	0	2	0	0	1	5
(British Columbia) Jim Cotter	0	0	1	0	0	1	1	0	3

==== Draw 3 ====
Thursday, November 14, 12:00

Sheet A	1	2	3	4	5	6	7	8	Final
(Quebec) Jean-Michel Ménard	1	0	0	1	0	0	X	X	2
(Denmark) Rasmus Stjerne	0	3	3	0	1	1	X	X	8

Sheet B	1	2	3	4	5	6	7	8	Final
(Switzerland) Sven Michel	1	0	0	2	0	0	X	X	3
(Norway) Thomas Ulsrud	0	3	1	0	3	1	X	X	8

Sheet C	1	2	3	4	5	6	7	8	Final
(Alberta) Kevin Martin	1	0	0	0	2	0	X	X	3
(Ontario) John Epping	0	2	0	3	0	3	X	X	8

Sheet D	1	2	3	4	5	6	7	8	Final
(Manitoba) Jeff Stoughton	0	1	0	2	1	0	0	1	5
(Manitoba) Rob Fowler	1	0	1	0	0	0	2	0	3

Sheet E	1	2	3	4	5	6	7	8	9	Final
(Newfoundland and Labrador) Brad Gushue	0	2	0	2	1	1	0	0	1	7
(Ontario) Mark Kean	3	0	1	0	0	0	1	1	0	6

==== Draw 4 ====
Thursday, November 14, 15:30

Sheet A	1	2	3	4	5	6	7	8	Final
(Manitoba) Rob Fowler	3	0	3	0	2	X	X	X	8
(Ontario) Robert Rumfeldt	0	1	0	1	0	X	X	X	2

Sheet B	1	2	3	4	5	6	7	8	Final
(Sweden) Niklas Edin	0	2	0	0	2	0	0	0	4
(British Columbia) Jim Cotter	1	0	0	1	0	1	1	1	5

Sheet C	1	2	3	4	5	6	7	8	Final
(Ontario) Glenn Howard	0	3	1	0	2	0	1	0	7
(Manitoba) Jeff Stoughton	1	0	0	2	0	1	0	1	5

Sheet D	1	2	3	4	5	6	7	8	9	Final
(Manitoba) Mike McEwen	1	0	2	0	1	0	1	0	0	5
(Ontario) Brad Jacobs	0	2	0	1	0	0	0	2	1	6

Sheet E	1	2	3	4	5	6	7	8	Final
(Alberta) Kevin Koe	2	0	0	1	0	1	0	X	4
(Switzerland) Peter de Cruz	0	0	2	0	2	0	3	X	7

==== Draw 5 ====
Thursday, November 14, 19:30

Sheet A	1	2	3	4	5	6	7	8	Final
(Manitoba) Mike McEwen	2	0	0	2	0	1	1	X	6
(Newfoundland and Labrador) Brad Gushue	0	1	0	0	2	0	0	X	3

Sheet B	1	2	3	4	5	6	7	8	Final
(Ontario) John Epping	1	0	0	2	0	0	X	X	3
(Quebec) Jean-Michel Ménard	0	3	0	0	2	2	X	X	7

Sheet C	1	2	3	4	5	6	7	8	Final
(Sweden) Niklas Edin	0	0	1	0	0	0	0	X	1
(Ontario) Brad Jacobs	0	1	0	3	1	0	1	X	6

Sheet D	1	2	3	4	5	6	7	8	Final
(Alberta) Kevin Martin	0	2	0	2	0	1	0	1	6
(Norway) Thomas Ulsrud	1	0	2	0	1	0	1	0	5

Sheet E	1	2	3	4	5	6	7	8	Final
(Switzerland) Sven Michel	2	0	0	2	1	0	1	0	6
(Denmark) Rasmus Stjerne	0	4	1	0	0	3	0	1	9

==== Draw 6 ====
Friday, November 15, 8:30

Sheet A	1	2	3	4	5	6	7	8	Final
(Manitoba) Jeff Stoughton	0	0	0	0	0	1	0	X	1
(Alberta) Kevin Koe	0	0	0	1	1	0	2	X	4

Sheet B	1	2	3	4	5	6	7	8	Final
(Ontario) Robert Rumfeldt	0	2	0	0	0	1	0	X	3
(Switzerland) Peter de Cruz	1	0	0	2	1	0	1	X	5

Sheet C	1	2	3	4	5	6	7	8	Final
(Ontario) John Epping	0	0	2	0	0	1	2	0	5
(Denmark) Rasmus Stjerne	1	2	0	1	1	0	0	1	6

Sheet D	1	2	3	4	5	6	7	8	Final
(Ontario) Glenn Howard	2	0	4	0	3	X	X	X	9
(Manitoba) Rob Fowler	0	1	0	2	0	X	X	X	3

Sheet E	1	2	3	4	5	6	7	8	Final
(Ontario) Mark Kean	0	2	0	1	1	0	0	0	4
(British Columbia) Jim Cotter	2	0	1	0	0	0	3	1	7

==== Draw 7 ====
Friday, November 15, 12:00

Sheet A	1	2	3	4	5	6	7	8	Final
(Ontario) Brad Jacobs	4	0	3	0	X	X	X	X	7
(Ontario) Mark Kean	0	1	0	1	X	X	X	X	2

Sheet B	1	2	3	4	5	6	7	8	Final
(Alberta) Kevin Martin	2	0	0	1	0	0	3	X	6
(Switzerland) Sven Michel	0	0	1	0	1	0	0	X	2

Sheet C	1	2	3	4	5	6	7	8	Final
(Newfoundland and Labrador) Brad Gushue	1	0	0	0	2	0	2	0	5
(British Columbia) Jim Cotter	0	2	1	0	0	1	0	2	6

Sheet D	1	2	3	4	5	6	7	8	Final
(Manitoba) Mike McEwen	1	0	2	0	0	1	0	0	4
(Sweden) Niklas Edin	0	4	0	1	0	0	1	3	9

Sheet E	1	2	3	4	5	6	7	8	Final
(Norway) Thomas Ulsrud	1	0	0	1	0	2	1	0	5
(Quebec) Jean-Michel Ménard	0	1	2	0	4	0	0	1	8

==== Draw 8 ====
Friday, November 15, 15:30

Sheet A	1	2	3	4	5	6	7	8	Final
(Alberta) Kevin Martin	1	0	0	4	2	X	X	X	7
(Denmark) Rasmus Stjerne	0	1	1	0	0	X	X	X	2

Sheet B	1	2	3	4	5	6	7	8	Final
(Norway) Thomas Ulsrud	0	2	1	1	0	4	0	X	8
(Ontario) John Epping	3	0	0	0	2	0	1	X	6

Sheet C	1	2	3	4	5	6	7	8	Final
(Manitoba) Jeff Stoughton	2	4	2	X	X	X	X	X	8
(Switzerland) Peter de Cruz	0	0	0	X	X	X	X	X	0

Sheet D	1	2	3	4	5	6	7	8	Final
(Alberta) Kevin Koe	1	2	1	0	2	X	X	X	6
(Manitoba) Rob Fowler	0	0	0	1	0	X	X	X	1

Sheet E	1	2	3	4	5	6	7	8	Final
(Ontario) Glenn Howard	0	0	1	0	1	0	X	X	2
(Ontario) Robert Rumfeldt	0	1	0	2	0	2	X	X	5

Sheet F	1	2	3	4	5	6	7	8	Final
(Switzerland) Sven Michel	0	1	0	1	0	X	X	X	2
(Quebec) Jean-Michel Ménard	1	0	5	0	2	X	X	X	8

==== Draw 9 ====
Friday, November 15, 19:00

Sheet C	1	2	3	4	5	6	7	8	Final
(Ontario) Glenn Howard	1	0	0	1	0	0	1	0	3
(Alberta) Kevin Koe	0	1	0	0	0	1	0	2	4

=== Tiebreakers ===
Saturday, November 17, 8:30

Team	1	2	3	4	5	6	7	8	Final
(Norway) Thomas Ulsrud	0	2	1	1	1	0	1	X	6
(Denmark) Rasmus Stjerne	1	0	0	0	0	1	0	X	2

Team	1	2	3	4	5	6	7	8	Final
(Manitoba) Jeff Stoughton	0	0	2	0	2	1	0	2	7
(Quebec) Jean-Michel Ménard	2	1	0	1	0	0	2	0	6

Team	1	2	3	4	5	6	7	8	Final
(Switzerland) Peter de Cruz	0	0	0	2	0	0	3	0	5
(British Columbia) Jim Cotter	0	0	3	0	0	3	0	1	7

Saturday, November 17, 12:00

Team	1	2	3	4	5	6	7	8	Final
(Manitoba) Mike McEwen	0	0	5	1	X	X	X	X	6
(Norway) Thomas Ulsrud	0	0	0	0	X	X	X	X	0

== Tier II ==
=== Teams ===
The teams are listed as follows:

Skip	Third	Second	Lead	Locale
Mark Bice	Tyler Morgan	Steve Bice	Jamie Farnell	Toronto, Ontario
Martin Ferland	François Roberge	Shawn Fowler	Maxime Elmaleh	Quebec City, Quebec
Ian Fitzner-Leblanc (fourth)	Paul Flemming (skip)	Graham Breckon	Kelly Middelstadt	Halifax, Nova Scotia
Joe Frans	Ryan Werenich	Jeff Gorda	Shawn Kaufman	Bradford, Ontario
Chris Gardner (fourth)	Mathew Camm	Brad Kidd	Bryan Cochrane (skip)	Ottawa, Ontario
Sean Geall	Jay Peachey	Sebastien Robillard	Mark Olson	New Westminster, British Columbia
Pascal Hess	Yves Hess	Florian Meister	Stefan Meienberg	Switzerland
Brent Ross (fourth)	Jake Higgs (skip)	Codey Maus	Bill Buchanan	Harriston, Ontario
Steve Laycock	Kirk Muyres	Colton Flasch	Dallan Muyres	Saskatoon, Saskatchewan
Philippe Lemay	Mathieu Beaufort	Jean-Michel Arsenault	Érik Lachance	Trois-Rivières, Quebec
Heath McCormick	Matt Hames	Bill Stopera	Dean Gemmell	(New York (state)) New York City, New York
Jamie Murphy	Jordan Pinder	Mike Bardsley	Don McDermaid	Halifax, Nova Scotia
David Nedohin	Colin Hodgson	Mike Westlund	Tom Sallows	Edmonton, Alberta
Dan Petryk (fourth)	Steve Petryk (skip)	Roland Robinson	Thomas Usselman	Calgary, Alberta
Wayne Tuck Jr.	Chad Allen	Jay Allen	Caleb Flaxey	Toronto, Ontario
Brock Virtue	Braeden Moskowy	Chris Schille	D. J. Kidby	Regina, Saskatchewan

=== Knockout Draw Brackets ===
The draw is listed as follows:

==== A event ====
First Knockout		Semifinals		Qualifier 1
(Ontario) Mark Bice	8
(British Columbia) Sean Geall	5	(Ontario) Mark Bice	7
(Alberta) Steve Petryk	2	(Switzerland) Pascal Hess	5
(Switzerland) Pascal Hess	7			(Ontario) Mark Bice	3
(Alberta) David Nedohin	3			(Nova Scotia) Jamie Murphy	7
(Nova Scotia) Jamie Murphy	7	(Nova Scotia) Jamie Murphy	9
(Quebec) Philippe Lemay	7	(Quebec) Philippe Lemay	3
(Ontario) Bryan Cochrane	2

First Knockout		Semifinals		Qualifier 2
(Ontario) Joe Frans	6
(Ontario) Wayne Tuck Jr.	5	(Ontario) Joe Frans	7
(Saskatchewan) Brock Virtue	6	(Saskatchewan) Brock Virtue	1
(Ontario) Jake Higgs	4			(Ontario) Joe Frans	2
(Quebec) Martin Ferland	9			(Saskatchewan) Steve Laycock	7
(New York (state)) Heath McCormick	3	(Quebec) Martin Ferland	3
(Nova Scotia) Paul Flemming	6	(Saskatchewan) Steve Laycock	8
(Saskatchewan) Steve Laycock	9

==== B event ====
Second Knockout		Semifinals		Qualifier 3
(British Columbia) Sean Geall	7
(Alberta) Steve Petryk	2	(British Columbia) Sean Geall	4
(Alberta) David Nedohin	5	(Ontario) Bryan Cochrane	7
(Ontario) Bryan Cochrane	6			(Ontario) Bryan Cochrane	7
				(Ontario) Joe Frans	4

Second Knockout		Semifinals		Qualifier 4
(Ontario) Wayne Tuck Jr.	8
(Ontario) Jake Higgs	3	(Ontario) Wayne Tuck Jr.	7
(New York (state)) Heath McCormick	1	(Nova Scotia) Paul Flemming	1
(Nova Scotia) Paul Flemming	6			(Ontario) Wayne Tuck Jr.	3
				(Ontario) Mark Bice	5

Second Knockout		Qualifier 5
(Switzerland) Pascal Hess	3
(Quebec) Philippe Lemay	7	(Quebec) Philippe Lemay	6
(Saskatchewan) Brock Virtue	2	(Quebec) Martin Ferland	7
(Quebec) Martin Ferland	5

==== C event ====
Third Knockout		Semifinals		Qualifier 6
(Alberta) Steve Petryk	5
(Alberta) David Nedohin	4	(Alberta) Steve Petryk	1
		(Saskatchewan) Brock Virtue	8
				(Saskatchewan) Brock Virtue	3
				(Ontario) Wayne Tuck Jr.	7

Third Knockout		Semifinals		Qualifier 7
(Ontario) Jake Higgs	5
(New York (state)) Heath McCormick	7	(New York (state)) Heath McCormick	7
		(Switzerland) Pascal Hess	8
				(Switzerland) Pascal Hess	3
				(Ontario) Joe Frans	6

Third Knockout		Qualifier 8
(British Columbia) Sean Geall	7
(Nova Scotia) Paul Flemming	1	(British Columbia) Sean Geall	6
		(Quebec) Philippe Lemay	2

=== Knockout results ===
All draw times are listed in Eastern Standard Time.

==== Draw 1 ====
Thursday, November 14, 8:30

Sheet 1	1	2	3	4	5	6	7	8	Final
(Ontario) Mark Bice	3	1	0	0	2	0	2	X	8
(British Columbia) Sean Geall	0	0	2	1	0	2	0	X	5

Sheet 2	1	2	3	4	5	6	7	8	Final
(Alberta) Steve Petryk	0	0	0	0	2	0	X	X	2
(Switzerland) Pascal Hess	0	2	2	1	0	2	X	X	7

Sheet 3	1	2	3	4	5	6	7	8	Final
(Alberta) David Nedohin	0	2	0	0	0	1	X	X	3
(Nova Scotia) Jamie Murphy	2	0	0	4	1	0	X	X	7

Sheet 4	1	2	3	4	5	6	7	8	Final
(Quebec) Philippe Lemay	1	0	2	1	0	1	2	X	7
(Ontario) Bryan Cochrane	0	1	0	0	1	0	0	X	2

==== Draw 2 ====
Thursday, November 14, 11:30

Sheet 1	1	2	3	4	5	6	7	8	9	Final
(Ontario) Joe Frans	0	0	1	0	0	2	1	1	1	6
(Ontario) Wayne Tuck Jr.	1	1	0	1	2	0	0	0	0	5

Sheet 2	1	2	3	4	5	6	7	8	Final
(Saskatchewan) Brock Virtue	2	0	1	0	2	0	1	X	6
(Ontario) Jake Higgs	0	1	0	2	0	1	0	X	4

Sheet 3	1	2	3	4	5	6	7	8	Final
(Quebec) Martin Ferland	1	0	2	0	1	1	4	X	9
(New York (state)) Heath McCormick	0	2	0	1	0	0	0	X	3

Sheet 4	1	2	3	4	5	6	7	8	Final
(Nova Scotia) Paul Flemming	0	3	0	0	2	0	1	0	6
(Saskatchewan) Steve Laycock	2	0	3	2	0	1	0	1	9

==== Draw 3 ====
Thursday, November 14, 14:30

Sheet 1	1	2	3	4	5	6	7	8	9	Final
(Ontario) Mark Bice	0	1	0	0	2	1	1	0	2	7
(Switzerland) Pascal Hess	0	0	2	1	0	0	0	2	0	5

Sheet 2	1	2	3	4	5	6	7	8	Final
(Nova Scotia) Jamie Murphy	2	0	3	0	0	4	X	X	9
(Quebec) Philippe Lemay	0	1	0	1	1	0	X	X	3

Sheet 3	1	2	3	4	5	6	7	8	Final
(British Columbia) Sean Geall	2	0	4	1	0	X	X	X	7
(Alberta) Steve Petryk	0	1	0	0	1	X	X	X	2

Sheet 4	1	2	3	4	5	6	7	8	Final
(Alberta) David Nedohin	1	0	0	0	2	0	1	1	5
(Ontario) Bryan Cochrane	0	0	2	1	0	3	0	0	6

==== Draw 4 ====
Thursday, November 14, 17:30

Sheet 1	1	2	3	4	5	6	7	8	Final
(Ontario) Joe Frans	0	5	0	2	X	X	X	X	7
(Saskatchewan) Brock Virtue	0	0	1	0	X	X	X	X	1

Sheet 2	1	2	3	4	5	6	7	8	Final
(Quebec) Martin Ferland	0	1	0	2	0	0	X	X	3
(Saskatchewan) Steve Laycock	3	0	2	0	1	2	X	X	8

Sheet 3	1	2	3	4	5	6	7	8	Final
(Ontario) Wayne Tuck Jr.	1	0	2	1	0	4	X	X	8
(Ontario) Jake Higgs	0	2	0	0	1	0	X	X	3

Sheet 4	1	2	3	4	5	6	7	8	Final
(New York (state)) Heath McCormick	0	0	0	0	1	0	X	X	1
(Nova Scotia) Paul Flemming	0	1	2	2	0	1	X	X	6

==== Draw 5 ====
Thursday, November 14, 20:30

Sheet 1	1	2	3	4	5	6	7	8	Final
(Ontario) Mark Bice	0	0	0	1	0	2	0	X	3
(Nova Scotia) Jamie Murphy	3	0	2	0	1	0	1	X	7

Sheet 2	1	2	3	4	5	6	7	8	Final
(British Columbia) Sean Geall	0	0	1	0	0	3	0	X	4
(Ontario) Bryan Cochrane	0	2	0	1	2	0	2	X	7

Sheet 3	1	2	3	4	5	6	7	8	Final
(Switzerland) Pascal Hess	0	0	0	2	0	0	0	X	3
(Quebec) Philippe Lemay	1	1	0	0	3	1	1	X	7

==== Draw 6 ====
Friday, November 15, 8:30

Sheet 1	1	2	3	4	5	6	7	8	Final
(Ontario) Joe Frans	1	0	0	1	0	0	X	X	2
(Saskatchewan) Steve Laycock	0	1	2	0	2	2	X	X	7

Sheet 2	1	2	3	4	5	6	7	8	Final
(Ontario) Wayne Tuck Jr.	1	2	0	4	X	X	X	X	7
(Nova Scotia) Paul Flemming	0	0	1	0	X	X	X	X	1

Sheet 3	1	2	3	4	5	6	7	8	Final
(Saskatchewan) Brock Virtue	1	0	0	0	1	0	0	X	2
(Quebec) Martin Ferland	0	2	0	1	0	0	2	X	5

Sheet 4	1	2	3	4	5	6	7	8	Final
(Alberta) Steve Petryk	0	1	0	1	1	1	0	1	5
(Alberta) David Nedohin	2	0	1	0	0	0	1	0	4

==== Draw 7 ====
Friday, November 15, 12:30

Sheet 1	1	2	3	4	5	6	7	8	Final
(Ontario) Bryan Cochrane	0	1	1	0	2	0	2	1	7
(Ontario) Joe Frans	1	0	0	1	0	2	0	0	4

Sheet 2	1	2	3	4	5	6	7	8	Final
(Ontario) Wayne Tuck Jr.	1	0	0	1	0	1	0	X	3
(Ontario) Mark Bice	0	0	2	0	2	0	1	X	5

Sheet 3	1	2	3	4	5	6	7	8	9	Final
(Quebec) Philippe Lemay	0	0	0	2	2	0	0	2	0	6
(Quebec) Martin Ferland	1	3	1	0	0	0	1	0	1	7

Sheet 4	1	2	3	4	5	6	7	8	Final
(Ontario) Jake Higgs	0	1	3	0	0	1	0	0	5
(New York (state)) Heath McCormick	0	0	0	2	1	0	3	1	7

==== Draw 8 ====
Friday, November 15, 16:30

Sheet 1	1	2	3	4	5	6	7	8	Final
(Alberta) Steve Petryk	0	1	0	0	X	X	X	X	1
(Saskatchewan) Brock Virtue	3	0	4	1	X	X	X	X	8

Sheet 2	1	2	3	4	5	6	7	8	Final
(New York (state)) Heath McCormick	1	0	2	0	2	0	2	X	7
(Switzerland) Pascal Hess	0	3	0	4	0	1	0	X	8

Sheet 3	1	2	3	4	5	6	7	8	Final
(British Columbia) Sean Geall	3	0	1	3	X	X	X	X	7
(Nova Scotia) Paul Flemming	0	1	0	0	X	X	X	X	1

==== Draw 9 ====
Friday, November 15, 20:30

Sheet 2	1	2	3	4	5	6	7	8	Final
(British Columbia) Sean Geall	1	2	0	0	3	0	X	X	6
(Quebec) Philippe Lemay	0	0	0	1	0	1	X	X	2

Sheet 3	1	2	3	4	5	6	7	8	Final
(Switzerland) Pascal Hess	0	1	0	0	0	2	X	X	3
(Ontario) Joe Frans	1	0	2	1	2	0	X	X	6

Sheet 4	1	2	3	4	5	6	7	8	Final
(Saskatchewan) Brock Virtue	0	0	2	0	0	1	X	X	3
(Ontario) Wayne Tuck Jr.	2	1	0	3	1	0	X	X	7

=== Playoffs qualifiers ===
Semifinals		To Playoffs
(Nova Scotia) Jamie Murphy	5
(British Columbia) Sean Geall	3	(Nova Scotia) Jamie Murphy	8
(Ontario) Mark Bice	6	(Ontario) Mark Bice	9
(Quebec) Martin Ferland	1

Semifinals		To Playoffs
(Saskatchewan) Steve Laycock	5
(Ontario) Joe Frans	4	(Saskatchewan) Steve Laycock	5
(Ontario) Bryan Cochrane	9	(Ontario) Bryan Cochrane	1
(Ontario) Wayne Tuck Jr.	2

==== Results ====
Saturday, November 16, 8:30

Sheet 2	1	2	3	4	5	6	7	8	Final
(Nova Scotia) Jamie Murphy	0	1	1	1	0	1	0	1	5
(British Columbia) Sean Geall	1	0	0	0	1	0	1	0	3

Sheet 3	1	2	3	4	5	6	7	8	Final
(Ontario) Mark Bice	1	1	4	0	X	X	X	X	6
(Quebec) Martin Ferland	0	0	0	1	X	X	X	X	1

Sheet 4	1	2	3	4	5	6	7	8	Final
(Saskatchewan) Steve Laycock	2	1	0	1	0	1	0	0	5
(Ontario) Joe Frans	0	0	1	0	0	0	2	1	4

Sheet 5	1	2	3	4	5	6	7	8	Final
(Ontario) Bryan Cochrane	2	1	0	0	2	4	X	X	9
(Ontario) Wayne Tuck Jr.	0	0	1	1	0	0	X	X	2

Saturday, November 16, 12:00

Team	1	2	3	4	5	6	7	8	Final
(Saskatchewan) Steve Laycock	0	0	2	0	2	0	1	X	5
(Ontario) Bryan Cochrane	0	0	0	1	0	0	0	X	1

Team	1	2	3	4	5	6	7	8	9	Final
(Nova Scotia) Jamie Murphy	0	2	0	4	0	0	1	1	0	8
(Ontario) Mark Bice	2	0	3	0	0	3	0	0	1	9

== Playoffs ==
Quarterfinals
(Ontario) Brad Jacobs	1
(Saskatchewan) Steve Laycock	4
(Manitoba) Mike McEwen	3
(British Columbia) Jim Cotter	6
(Alberta) Kevin Koe	6
(Ontario) Mark Bice	4
(Alberta) Kevin Martin	5
(Manitoba) Jeff Stoughton	3

Semifinals
(Saskatchewan) Steve Laycock	3
(British Columbia) Jim Cotter	6
(Alberta) Kevin Koe	6
(Alberta) Kevin Martin	5

Final
(British Columbia) Jim Cotter	5
(Alberta) Kevin Koe	7

=== Quarterfinals ===
Saturday, November 17, 15:30

Team	1	2	3	4	5	6	7	8	Final
(Manitoba) Mike McEwen	0	0	0	0	2	0	1	0	3
(British Columbia) Jim Cotter	0	2	0	0	0	3	0	1	6

Player percentages
(Manitoba) Mike McEwen		(British Columbia) Jim Cotter	
Denni Neufeld	95%	Rick Sawatsky	88%
Matt Wozniak	91%	Tyrel Griffith	95%
B.J. Neufeld	90%	Jason Gunnlaugson	87%
Mike McEwen	80%	Jim Cotter	90%
Total	89%	Total	90%

Team	1	2	3	4	5	6	7	8	Final
(Alberta) Kevin Martin	1	0	0	1	0	1	1	1	5
(Manitoba) Jeff Stoughton	0	1	0	0	2	0	0	0	3

Player percentages
(Alberta) Kevin Martin		(Manitoba) Jeff Stoughton	
Ben Hebert	91%	Mark Nichols	80%
Marc Kennedy	82%	Reid Carruthers	91%
John Morris	89%	Jon Mead	94%
Kevin Martin	83%	Jeff Stoughton	94%
Total	86%	Total	90%

Saturday, November 17, 19:30

Team	1	2	3	4	5	6	7	8	Final
(Ontario) Brad Jacobs	0	0	0	0	1	0	0	X	1
(Saskatchewan) Steve Laycock	0	0	0	2	0	0	2	X	4

Player percentages
(Ontario) Brad Jacobs		(Saskatchewan) Steve Laycock	
Ryan Harnden	91%	Dallan Muyres	77%
E. J. Harnden	88%	Colton Flasch	88%
Ryan Fry	82%	Kirk Muyres	85%
Brad Jacobs	81%	Steve Laycock	98%
Total	86%	Total	87%

Team	1	2	3	4	5	6	7	8	Final
(Alberta) Kevin Koe	1	0	3	0	1	0	0	1	6
(Ontario) Mark Bice	0	2	0	1	0	1	0	0	4

Player percentages
(Alberta) Kevin Koe		(Ontario) Mark Bice	
Nolan Thiessen	80%	Jamie Farnell	92%
Carter Rycroft	74%	Steve Bice	70%
Pat Simmons	87%	Tyler Morgan	66%
Kevin Koe	86%	Mark Bice	78%
Total	82%	Total	77%

=== Semifinals ===
Sunday, November 18, 8:00

Team	1	2	3	4	5	6	7	8	Final
(Saskatchewan) Steve Laycock	0	1	0	1	0	0	1	0	3
(British Columbia) Jim Cotter	2	0	2	0	1	0	0	1	6

Player percentages
(Saskatchewan) Steve Laycock		(Alberta) Jim Cotter	
Dallan Muyres	88%	Rick Sawatsky	79%
Colton Flasch	79%	Tyrel Griffith	89%
Kirk Muyres	78%	Jason Gunnlaugson	80%
Steve Laycock	61%	Jim Cotter	81%
Total	76%	Total	82%

Team	1	2	3	4	5	6	7	8	9	Final
(Alberta) Kevin Koe	2	0	1	1	0	1	0	0	1	6
(Alberta) Kevin Martin	0	1	0	0	2	0	0	2	0	5

Player percentages
(Alberta) Kevin Koe		(Alberta) Kevin Martin	
Nolan Thiessen	80%	Ben Hebert	88%
Carter Rycroft	88%	Marc Kennedy	87%
Pat Simmons	64%	John Morris	67%
Kevin Koe	97%	Kevin Martin	73%
Total	82%	Total	79%

=== Final ===
Sunday, November 18, 13:00

Team	1	2	3	4	5	6	7	8	Final
(British Columbia) Jim Cotter	2	0	1	0	0	0	2	0	5
(Alberta) Kevin Koe	0	2	0	0	3	1	0	1	7

Player percentages
(British Columbia) Jim Cotter		(Alberta) Kevin Koe	
Rick Sawatsky	95%	Nolan Thiessen	91%
Tyrel Griffith	79%	Carter Rycroft	91%
Jason Gunnlaugson	82%	Pat Simmons	82%
Jim Cotter	72%	Kevin Koe	82%
Total	82%	Total	87%
