= 2013 The Dominion Tankard =

Curling championship in Canada

- Host city: Barrie, Ontario
- Arena: Barrie Molson Centre
- Dates: February 4–10
- Winner: Glenn Howard
- Curling club: Coldwater & District CC
- Skip: Glenn Howard
- Third: Wayne Middaugh
- Second: Brent Laing
- Lead: Craig Savill
- Finalist: Joe Frans (Bradford & District CC)

The 2013 Dominion Tankard, southern Ontario's men's provincial curling championship, was held from February 4 to 10 at the Barrie Molson Centre in Barrie, Ontario. The winning team of Glenn Howard represented Ontario at the 2013 Tim Hortons Brier in Edmonton, Alberta.

Howard won his 15th provincial championship, and continued his record 8th straight title by defeating Joe Frans in the final.

== Teams ==
Skip	Third	Second	Lead	Alternate	Club(s)
Chris Gardner (fourth)	Mathew Camm	Brad Kidd	Bryan Cochrane (skip)		City View Curling Club, Ottawa
Dayna Deruelle	Andrew McGaugh	Kevin Lagerquist	Evan DeViller		Brampton Curling Club, Brampton
John Epping	Scott Bailey	Scott Howard	David Mathers		Donalda Curling Club, Toronto
Pat Ferris	Andrew Fairfull	Craig Fairfull	Rob Larmer		Grimsby Curling Club, Grimsby
Joe Frans	Ryan Werenich	Jeff Gorda	Shawn Kaufman		Bradford & District Curling Club, Bradford
Brent Ross (fourth)	Jake Higgs (skip)	Codey Maus	Bill Buchanan		Harriston Curling Club, Harriston
Glenn Howard	Wayne Middaugh	Brent Laing	Craig Savill		Coldwater and District Curling Club, Coldwater
Darryl Prebble	Denis Belanger	Mark Koivula	Dennis Lemon		Royal Canadian Curling Club, Toronto
Howard Rajala	J. P. Lachance	Chris Fulton	Paul Madden		Rideau Curling Club, Ottawa
Robert Rumfeldt	Adam Spencer	Scott Hodgson	Greg Robinson	Scott Hodgson	Guelph Curling Club, Guelph
Wayne Tuck, Jr.	Chad Allen	Jay Allen	Caleb Flaxey		Brant Curling Club, Brantford

== Round-robin standings ==
Final round-robin standings

Key
Teams to Playoffs

Skip (Club)	W	L	PF	PA	Ends Won	Ends Lost	Blank Ends	Stolen Ends
Joe Frans (Bradford)	8	2	69	47	42	27	14	17
Glenn Howard (Coldwater)	7	3	67	38	36	29	14	11
Robert Rumfeldt (Guelph)	7	3	66	56	38	37	13	11
John Epping (Donalda)	7	3	68	48	37	32	10	9
Pat Ferris (Grimsby)	5	5	58	65	39	41	8	9
Darryl Prebble (Royals)	5	5	57	66	39	41	9	13
Bryan Cochrane (City View)	4	6	62	65	39	38	6	13
Dayna Deruelle (Brampton)	4	6	54	67	34	36	10	9
Wayne Tuck, Jr. (Brant)	4	6	66	64	38	42	10	8
Howard Rajala (Rideau)	2	8	51	70	33	42	15	8
Jake Higgs (Harriston)	2	8	46	78	30	40	5	6

== Results ==
=== Draw 1 ===
February 4, 14:00

Sheet A	1	2	3	4	5	6	7	8	9	10	Final
Tuck	0	1	0	0	1	0	0	X	X	X	2
Howard 🔨	1	0	0	4	0	0	2	X	X	X	7

Sheet B	1	2	3	4	5	6	7	8	9	10	Final
Ferris	0	1	0	0	2	0	0	1	2	1	7
Higgs 🔨	1	0	1	0	0	1	2	0	0	0	5

Sheet C	1	2	3	4	5	6	7	8	9	10	Final
Rajala	0	1	0	0	0	0	0	1	0	X	2
Epping 🔨	2	0	1	2	0	0	0	0	1	X	6

Sheet D	1	2	3	4	5	6	7	8	9	10	Final
Deruelle 🔨	0	0	0	1	0	0	1	0	X	X	2
Frans	0	0	1	0	1	2	0	3	X	X	7

Sheet E	1	2	3	4	5	6	7	8	9	10	Final
Prebble	0	0	0	0	1	2	0	0	0	0	3
Rumfeldt 🔨	0	0	0	1	0	0	0	2	1	2	6

=== Draw 2 ===
February 4, 19:30

Sheet A	1	2	3	4	5	6	7	8	9	10	Final
Epping 🔨	0	2	0	0	0	3	0	0	2	X	7
Frans	1	0	0	0	2	0	1	1	0	X	5

Sheet B	1	2	3	4	5	6	7	8	9	10	Final
Prebble 🔨	0	0	1	0	2	0	2	0	1	0	6
Ferris	1	1	0	1	0	2	0	1	0	1	7

Sheet C	1	2	3	4	5	6	7	8	9	10	Final
Howard	1	1	2	0	1	0	3	X	X	X	8
Rumfeldt 🔨	0	0	0	0	0	1	0	X	X	X	1

Sheet D	1	2	3	4	5	6	7	8	9	10	Final
Tuck	0	1	1	0	2	0	0	3	2	X	9
Cochrane 🔨	1	0	0	1	0	1	1	0	0	X	4

Sheet E	1	2	3	4	5	6	7	8	9	10	11	Final
Rajala	1	1	0	0	1	2	0	1	0	0	2	8
Higgs 🔨	0	0	1	1	0	0	1	0	1	2	0	6

=== Draw 3 ===
February 4, 19:30

Sheet A	1	2	3	4	5	6	7	8	9	10	Final
Rumfeldt	0	2	1	0	0	4	0	1	0	1	9
Cochrane 🔨	2	0	0	1	1	0	3	0	1	0	8

Sheet B	1	2	3	4	5	6	7	8	9	10	Final
Rajala 🔨	0	0	1	1	0	2	2	1	0	0	7
Prebble	2	2	0	0	1	0	0	0	2	1	8

Sheet C	1	2	3	4	5	6	7	8	9	10	Final
Frans	0	0	1	1	0	0	0	X	X	X	2
Higgs 🔨	2	0	0	0	2	2	2	X	X	X	8

Sheet D	1	2	3	4	5	6	7	8	9	10	Final
Epping 🔨	2	0	0	0	2	2	0	2	0	X	8
Deruelle	0	0	2	1	0	0	1	0	1	X	5

Sheet E	1	2	3	4	5	6	7	8	9	10	Final
Howard	1	1	4	0	3	X	X	X	X	X	9
Ferris 🔨	0	0	0	1	0	X	X	X	X	X	1

=== Draw 4 ===
February 4, 19:00

Sheet A	1	2	3	4	5	6	7	8	9	10	Final
Higgs 🔨	1	0	3	0	3	1	0	0	X	X	8
Deruelle	0	2	0	1	0	0	0	2	X	X	5

Sheet B	1	2	3	4	5	6	7	8	9	10	Final
Howard 🔨	0	0	2	0	2	0	2	0	0	X	6
Rajala	0	0	0	1	0	2	0	0	2	X	5

Sheet C	1	2	3	4	5	6	7	8	9	10	Final
Cochrane 🔨	1	1	0	0	1	0	1	0	X	X	4
Ferris	0	0	1	1	0	4	0	4	X	X	10

Sheet D	1	2	3	4	5	6	7	8	9	10	Final
Rumfeldt 🔨	1	0	1	0	0	0	1	2	0	1	6
Tuck	0	1	0	1	2	0	0	0	0	0	4

Sheet E	1	2	3	4	5	6	7	8	9	10	Final
Frans	1	3	0	1	0	0	0	4	X	X	9
Prebble 🔨	0	0	2	0	2	0	0	0	X	X	4

=== Draw 5 ===
February 6, 09:00

Sheet A	1	2	3	4	5	6	7	8	9	10	Final
Ferris 🔨	0	0	2	0	2	0	0	1	0	X	5
Tuck	1	1	0	1	0	0	1	0	5	X	9

Sheet B	1	2	3	4	5	6	7	8	9	10	Final
Frans	1	2	0	1	0	0	2	2	X	X	8
Howard 🔨	0	0	1	0	2	0	0	0	X	X	3

Sheet C	1	2	3	4	5	6	7	8	9	10	Final
Deruelle	0	0	0	2	2	0	2	1	1	X	8
Prebble 🔨	2	0	0	0	0	2	0	0	0	X	4

Sheet D	1	2	3	4	5	6	7	8	9	10	Final
Higgs	0	1	0	X	X	X	X	X	X	X	1
Epping 🔨	2	0	7	X	X	X	X	X	X	X	9

Sheet E	1	2	3	4	5	6	7	8	9	10	Final
Cochrane	1	0	0	3	0	0	1	0	X	X	5
Rajala 🔨	0	0	1	0	3	0	0	5	X	X	9

=== Draw 6 ===
February 6, 14:00

Sheet A	1	2	3	4	5	6	7	8	9	10	Final
Prebble 🔨	0	0	3	0	0	X	X	X	X	X	3
Epping	1	2	0	2	4	X	X	X	X	X	9

Sheet B	1	2	3	4	5	6	7	8	9	10	Final
Cochrane	0	2	0	0	0	0	X	X	X	X	2
Frans 🔨	1	0	0	1	2	2	X	X	X	X	6

Sheet C	1	2	3	4	5	6	7	8	9	10	Final
Tuck	0	2	0	1	1	0	2	2	X	X	8
Rajala 🔨	2	0	0	0	0	1	0	0	X	X	3

Sheet D	1	2	3	4	5	6	7	8	9	10	Final
Ferris 🔨	1	0	1	1	0	1	0	2	0	0	6
Rumfeldt	0	1	0	0	1	0	2	0	2	3	9

Sheet E	1	2	3	4	5	6	7	8	9	10	Final
Deruelle	0	1	0	0	X	X	X	X	X	X	1
Howard 🔨	6	0	1	2	X	X	X	X	X	X	9

=== Draw 7 ===
February 6, 19:00

Sheet A	1	2	3	4	5	6	7	8	9	10	Final
Rajala	0	0	0	2	0	0	0	0	X	X	2
Rumfeldt 🔨	1	1	0	0	1	0	0	3	X	X	6

Sheet B	1	2	3	4	5	6	7	8	9	10	Final
Deruelle	1	0	1	0	0	2	1	0	0	X	5
Cochrane 🔨	0	1	0	4	1	0	0	1	2	X	9

Sheet C	1	2	3	4	5	6	7	8	9	10	Final
Epping	0	0	1	0	0	2	0	0	1	0	4
Howard 🔨	1	1	0	1	0	0	0	2	0	1	6

Sheet D	1	2	3	4	5	6	7	8	9	10	Final
Prebble 🔨	2	2	1	1	1	0	1	X	X	X	8
Higgs	0	0	0	0	0	2	0	X	X	X	2

Sheet E	1	2	3	4	5	6	7	8	9	10	Final
Tuck	0	3	0	0	0	2	0	1	0	X	6
Frans 🔨	1	0	1	2	1	0	3	0	1	X	9

=== Draw 8 ===
February 7, 14:00

Sheet A	1	2	3	4	5	6	7	8	9	10	Final
Howard 🔨	3	3	0	1	0	2	X	X	X	X	9
Higgs	0	0	1	0	1	0	X	X	X	X	2

Sheet B	1	2	3	4	5	6	7	8	9	10	Final
Tuck	0	2	0	2	0	0	0	0	1	X	5
Deruelle 🔨	2	0	2	0	0	0	0	3	0	X	7

Sheet C	1	2	3	4	5	6	7	8	9	10	11	Final
Rumfeldt 🔨	0	2	0	3	0	2	0	1	0	0	0	8
Frans	0	0	1	0	2	0	1	0	3	1	1	9

Sheet D	1	2	3	4	5	6	7	8	9	10	Final
Rajala	1	0	1	0	1	0	0	0	2	0	5
Ferris 🔨	0	1	0	2	0	0	0	3	0	1	7

Sheet E	1	2	3	4	5	6	7	8	9	10	Final
Epping 🔨	0	1	0	1	0	0	0	X	X	X	2
Cochrane	2	0	2	0	2	0	1	X	X	X	7

=== Draw 9 ===
February 7, 19:00

Sheet A	1	2	3	4	5	6	7	8	9	10	Final
Frans 🔨	2	0	0	2	0	2	0	0	0	X	6
Ferris	0	1	0	0	2	0	0	0	1	X	4

Sheet B	1	2	3	4	5	6	7	8	9	10	Final
Epping	0	2	0	1	0	2	0	2	1	2	10
Tuck 🔨	1	0	3	0	1	0	4	0	0	0	9

Sheet C	1	2	3	4	5	6	7	8	9	10	Final
Higgs	0	0	1	0	0	2	0	X	X	X	3
Cochrane 🔨	0	2	0	1	1	0	5	X	X	X	9

Sheet D	1	2	3	4	5	6	7	8	9	10	Final
Howard 🔨	0	1	0	2	0	1	0	2	0	0	6
Prebble	1	0	2	0	1	0	1	0	1	1	7

Sheet E	1	2	3	4	5	6	7	8	9	10	Final
Rumfeldt	0	0	1	0	0	1	0	X	X	X	2
Deruelle 🔨	3	2	0	0	1	0	2	X	X	X	8

=== Draw 10 ===
February 8, 14:00

Sheet A	1	2	3	4	5	6	7	8	9	10	Final
Cochrane	1	0	0	0	0	2	2	0	2	0	7
Prebble 🔨	0	1	2	1	1	0	0	2	0	1	8

Sheet B	1	2	3	4	5	6	7	8	9	10	Final
Rumfeldt 🔨	2	0	0	2	0	1	2	0	X	X	7
Epping	0	1	1	0	1	0	0	1	X	X	4

Sheet C	1	2	3	4	5	6	7	8	9	10	Final
Ferris	1	3	0	1	0	0	1	2	X	X	8
Deruelle 🔨	0	0	1	0	1	1	0	0	X	X	3

Sheet D	1	2	3	4	5	6	7	8	9	10	Final
Frans	0	2	2	0	0	3	0	1	X	X	8
Rajala 🔨	1	0	0	0	1	0	1	0	X	X	3

Sheet E	1	2	3	4	5	6	7	8	9	10	Final
Higgs 🔨	1	0	1	0	1	0	2	0	2	X	7
Tuck	0	2	0	1	0	2	0	4	0	X	9

=== Draw 11 ===
February 8, 19:00

Sheet A	1	2	3	4	5	6	7	8	9	10	Final
Deruelle 🔨	1	0	0	2	3	0	2	0	2	X	10
Rajala	0	1	2	0	0	2	0	2	0	X	7

Sheet B	1	2	3	4	5	6	7	8	9	10	Final
Higgs 🔨	2	0	0	0	2	0	0	X	X	X	4
Rumfeldt	0	2	0	4	0	2	4	X	X	X	12

Sheet C	1	2	3	4	5	6	7	8	9	10	Final
Prebble 🔨	1	0	1	0	2	0	0	1	0	1	6
Tuck	0	1	0	1	0	0	1	0	2	0	5

Sheet D	1	2	3	4	5	6	7	8	9	10	Final
Cochrane 🔨	0	0	1	2	0	1	0	2	1	X	7
Howard	0	1	0	0	1	0	2	0	0	X	4

Sheet E	1	2	3	4	5	6	7	8	9	10	Final
Ferris	0	1	0	0	1	0	0	1	0	X	3
Epping 🔨	1	0	1	2	0	0	1	0	4	X	9

== Playoffs ==
Page playoff system
1	Joe Frans	3
2	Glenn Howard	5
3	Robert Rumfeldt	6
4	John Epping	7

Semifinal
1	Joe Frans	10
4	John Epping	4

Final
2	Glenn Howard	7
1	Joe Frans	5

=== 1 vs. 2 ===
Saturday, February 9, 2:00 pm

Team	1	2	3	4	5	6	7	8	9	10	Final
Joe Frans 🔨	2	0	0	0	0	0	0	0	1	0	3
Glenn Howard	0	2	2	0	0	0	0	0	0	1	5

=== 3 vs. 4 ===
Saturday, February 9, 7:00 pm

Team	1	2	3	4	5	6	7	8	9	10	11	Final
Robert Rumfeldt 🔨	0	0	1	0	0	1	1	0	2	1	0	6
John Epping	1	0	0	3	0	0	0	2	0	0	1	7

=== Semifinal ===
Sunday, February 10, 9:30 am

Team	1	2	3	4	5	6	7	8	9	10	Final
Joe Frans 🔨	0	3	1	0	3	0	1	2	X	X	10
John Epping	1	0	0	1	0	2	0	0	X	X	4

=== Final ===
Sunday, February 10, 2:30 pm

Team	1	2	3	4	5	6	7	8	9	10	Final
Glenn Howard 🔨	1	0	0	3	0	0	2	0	0	1	7
Joe Frans	0	1	0	0	2	0	0	1	1	0	5

2013 The Dominion Tankard

Glenn Howard
15th Ontario Provincial Championship title

== Qualification ==
Southern Ontario zones run from November 30-December 2, and December 7–11, 2012. Two teams from each zone qualify to 4 regional tournaments, and two teams from each of the two tournaments qualify to provincials. Two additional teams qualify out of a second chance qualifier. As defending champions, the Glenn Howard rink from the Coldwater and District Curling Club get an automatic berth in the Tankard.

Qualification method	Berths	Qualifying team
Defending champions	1	Glenn Howard
Region 1 Qualifiers	2	Bryan Cochrane; Howard Rajala
Region 2 Qualifiers	2	John Epping; Darryl Prebble
Region 3 Qualifiers	2	Robert Rumfeldt; Dayna Deruelle
Region 4 Qualifiers	2	Wayne Tuck, Jr. Pat Ferris
Challenge Round Qualifiers	2	Jake Higgs; Joe Frans

Regional Qualifiers In Bold

=== Zone Qualification ===
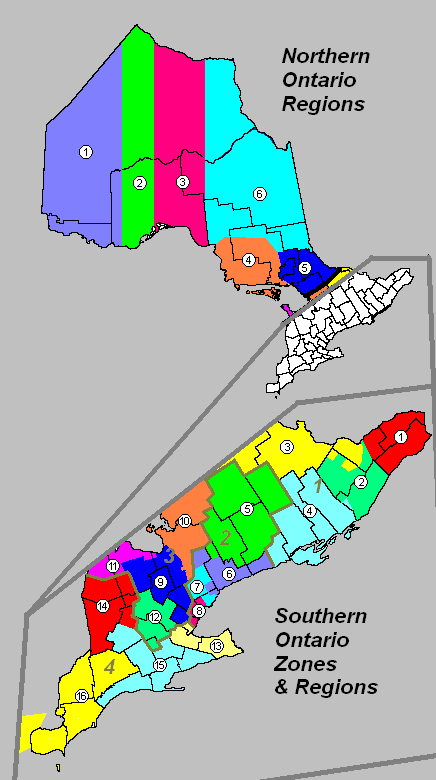
Zone Map

==== Zone 1 ====
December 7–9, at the RCMP Curling Club, Ottawa

Teams entered:

- Mark Homan (Ottawa)
- Alexander Dyer (Ottawa)
- **Spencer Cooper** (Ottawa)
- **Shane Latimer** (Ottawa)
- Ron Hrycak (Ottawa)
- Gary Rowe (Ottawa)
- Ian MacAulay (RCMP)
- Marc Bourguignon (RCMP)

==== Zone 2 ====
December 7–9, at the RCMP Curling Club, Ottawa

Teams entered:

- Dave Van Dine (Rideau)
- Greg Richardson (Rideau)
- Frank O'Driscoll (Rideau)
- **Howard Rajala** (Rideau)
- **Don Bowser** (Rideau)

==== Zone 3 ====
December 7–9, at the Arnprior Curling Club, Arnprior

Teams entered:

- Doug Johnston (Arnprior)
- **Bryan Cochrane** (City View)
- **Colin Dow** (Huntley)
- Damien Villard (Renfrew)

==== Zone 4 ====
December 7–9, at the Royal Kingston Curling Club, Kingston

Teams entered:

- Andrew Minty (Cataraqui)
- **Bryce Rowe** (Land O'Lakes)
- **Greg Balsdon** (Loonie)
- Jeff Clark (Loonie)
- Michael Bryson (Loonie)
- Rob Dickson (Napanee)
- Dave Collyer (Quinte)
- Dennis Murray (Quinte)

==== Zone 5 ====
December 7–9, at the Fenelon Falls Curling Club, Fenelon Falls

Teams entered:

- Shannon Beddows (Cannington)
- **Connor Duhaime** (Haliburton)
- **Malcolm Florence** (Lakefield)
- Dave Clark (Peterborough)
- Douglas Brewer (Peterborough)

==== Zone 6 ====
December 8–11, at the Oshawa Curling Club, Oshawa

Teams entered:

- **Mark Kean** (Annandale)
- Sean Aune (Annandale)
- Jason March (Annandale)
- **Tim Morrison** (Oshawa)
- David Fischer (Oshawa Golf)
- John Bell (Unionville)
- Bruce Jefferson (Uxbridge)
- Rob Lobel (Whitby)

==== Zone 7 ====
December 7–9, at the Bayview Golf & Country Club, Thornhill

Teams entered:

- **John Epping (Donalda)**
- **Tom Worth (Bayview)**
- Robert Morrow (Leaside)
- Michael Shepherd (Richmond Hill)
- Mike Anderson (Thornhill)
- Mike Inglis (Thornhill)
- Dave Coutanche (Richmond Hill)

==== Zone 8 ====
December 8–9, at the St. George's Golf & Country Club, Toronto

Teams entered:

- Dennis Moretto (Dixie)
- Josh Johnston (Royals)
- Josh Grant (Royals)
- **Darryl Prebble** (Royals)
- **Peter Corner** (St. George's)
- Wes Johnson (Weston)
- Ian Robertson (Royals)

==== Zone 9 ====
December 7–9, at the Markdale Golf & Curling Club, Markdale

Teams entered:

- Al Corbeil (Alliston)
- **Dayna Deruelle** (Brampton)
- Rayad Husain (Chinguacousy)
- **Cory Heggestad** (King)

==== Zone 10 ====
December 7–9, at the Bradford & District Curling Club, Bradford

Teams entered:

- Donald Campbell (Barrie)
- **Joe Frans** (Bradford)
- Travis Dafoe (Bradford)
- **Dale Matchett** (Cookstown)
- Andrew Thompson (Stroud)
- Steve Holmes (Parry Sound)

==== Zone 11 ====
December 7–9, at the Chesley Curling Club, Chesley

Teams entered:

- Brent Keeling (Blue Water)
- **Al Hutchinson** (Blue Water)
- **Jeff Thomson** (Chesley)
- Chris Heath (Collingwood)
- Tim Johns (Meaford)
- Steve Gregg (Paisley)
- Scott Ballantyne (Tara)
- Joey Rettinger (Tara)

==== Zone 12 ====
November 30-December 2, at the Elora Curling Club, Elora

Teams entered:

- Axel Larsen (Elora)
- **Robert Rumfeldt** (Guelph)
- Koko Gillis (Guelph)
- Dave Kuan (Kitchener-Waterloo Granite)
- Jeff Hamley (Ayr)
- **Peter Mellor** (Kitchener-Waterloo Granite)
- Geoff Chambers (Kitchener-Waterloo Granite)

==== Zone 13 ====
December 7–9, at the Glendale Golf & Country Club, Hamilton

Teams entered:

- Mark Fletcher (Burlington)
- Todd Maslin (Dundas Granite)
- Rob Brockbank (Dundas Granite)
- Kris Blonski (Dundas Valley)
- Jon St. Denis (Glendale)
- David Serwatuk (Glendale)
- Simon Ouelet (Glendale)
- **Pat Ferris** (Grimsby)
- **Terry Corbin** (St. Catharines)
- Daniel Frans (St. Catharines Golf)
- Brent Palmer (Burlington)
- Rick Thurston (Dundas Granite)
- Jackson Westoby-Willis (Hamilton Victoria)

==== Zone 14 ====
December 7–9, at the Listowel Curling Club, Listowel

Teams entered:

- **Jake Higgs** (Harriston)
- **Daryl Shane** (Listowel)
- Mike Aprile (Listowel)
- A. J. Schumacher (Walkerton)

==== Zone 15 ====
December 7–9, at the Aylmer Curling Club, Aylmer

Teams entered:

- Bowie Abbis-Mills (Aylmer)
- **Wayne Tuck, Jr.** (Brant)
- Brad Hertner (Brant)
- Bob Armstrong (Ingersoll)
- **Nick Rizzo** (Brant)

==== Zone 16 ====
December 7–9, at the Forest Curling & Social Club, Forest

Teams entered:

- **Dale Kelly** (Chatham Granite)
- Brett DeKoning (Chatham Granite)
- Mac Webster (Forest)
- Scott McDonald (Ilderton)
- Mike Pruliere (Sarnia)
- Tom Pruliere (Sarnia)
- **John Young, Jr.** (Chatham Granite)

=== Regional qualification ===
==== Region 1 ====
January 5–6, Carleton Place Curling Club, Carleton Place

A Side
1A	Shane Latimer	4
3B	**Colin Dow**	**8**
2A	Howard Rajala	6
4B	**Bryce Rowe**	**7**
3A	**Bryan Cochrane**	**6**
1B	Spencer Cooper	2
4A	**Greg Balsdon**	**11**
2B	Don Bowser	5

Semifinal
3B	Colin Dow	4
4B	**Bryce Rowe**	**8**
3A	**Bryan Cochrane**	**8**
4A	Greg Balsdon	5

Final
4B	Bryce Rowe	1
3A	**Bryan Cochrane**	**6**

B Side
1A	Shane Latimer	2
2A	**Howard Rajala**	**6**
1B	Spencer Cooper	2
2B	**Don Bowser**	**8**

Quarterfinal
4A	Greg Balsdon	2
2A	**Howard Rajala**	**7**
3B	**Colin Dow**	**9**
2B	Don Bowser	2

Semifinal
2A	**Howard Rajala**	**6**
3B	Colin Dow	5
**Final**
2A	**Howard Rajala**	**9**
4B	Bryce Rowe	5

==== Region 2 ====
January 5–6, High Park Club, Toronto

A Side
5A	**Connor Duhaime**	**8**
7B	Tom Worth	1
6A	Mark Kean	4
8B	**Darryl Prebble**	**8**
7A	**John Epping**	**10**
5B	Malcolm Florence	3
8A	Peter Corner	4
6B	**Tim Morrison**	**7**

Semifinal
5A	Connor Duhaime	7
8B	**Darryl Prebble**	**11**
7A	**John Epping**	**7**
6B	Tim Morrison	1

Final
8B	Darryl Prebble	4
7A	**John Epping**	**7**

B Side
7B	Tom Worth	2
6A	**Mark Kean**	**8**
5B	Malcolm Florence	2
8A	**Peter Corner**	**6**

Quarterfinal
6B	Tim Morrison	3
6A	**Mark Kean**	**9**
5A	Connor Duhaime	2
8A	**Peter Corner**	**8**

Semifinal
6A	Mark Kean	5
8A	**Peter Corner**	**6**
**Final**
8A	Peter Corner	6
8B	**Darryl Prebble**	**8**

==== Region 3 ====
January 5–6, Elmira & District Curling Club, Elmira

A Side
9A	**Dayna Deruelle**	**9**
11B	Al Hutchinson	3
10A	**Joe Frans**	**9**
12B	Peter Mellor	5
11A	Jeff Thomson	3
9B	**Cory Heggestad**	**7**
12A	**Rob Rumfeldt**	**6**
10B	Dale Matchett	1

Semifinal
9A	**Dayna Deruelle**	**6**
10A	Joe Frans	4
9B	Cory Heggestad	4
12A	**Rob Rumfeldt**	**7**

Final
9A	Dayna Deruelle	7
12A	**Rob Rumfeldt**	**8**

B Side
11B	Al Hutchinson	9
12B	**Peter Mellor**	**10**
11A	Jeff Thomson	1
10B	**Dale Matchett**	**8**

Quarterfinal
9B	**Cory Heggestad**	**6**
12B	Peter Mellor	3
10A	**Joe Frans**	**6**
10B	Dale Matchett	1

Semifinal
9B	**Cory Heggestad**	**6**
10A	Joe Frans	4
**Final**
9B	Cory Heggestad	7
9A	**Dayna Deruelle**	**10**

==== Region 4 ====
January 5–6, Glencoe and District Curling Club, Glencoe

A Side
13A	Pat Ferris	6
15B	**Wayne Tuck, Jr.**	**9**
14A	**Daryl Shane**	**7**
16B	John Young, Jr.	2
15A	**Nick Rizzo**	**8**
13B	Terry Corbin	5
16A	Dale Kelly	7
14B	**Jake Higgs**	**9**

Semifinal
15B	**Wayne Tuck, Jr.**	**8**
14A	Daryl Shane	4
15A	Nick Rizzo	4
14B	**Jake Higgs**	**6**

Final
15B	**Wayne Tuck, Jr.**	**10**
14B	Jake Higgs	7

B Side
13A	**Pat Ferris**	**9**
16B	John Young, Jr.	7
13B	Terry Corbin	6
16A	**Dale Kelly**	**7**

Quarterfinal
15A	Nick Rizzo	2
13A	**Pat Ferris**	**9**
14A	**Daryl Shane**	**7**
16A	Dale Kelly	6

Semifinal
13A	**Pat Ferris**	**7**
14A	Daryl Shane	2
**Final**
13A	**Pat Ferris**	**8**
14B	Jake Higgs	6

=== Challenge Round ===
January 11–14, at the Orangeville Curling Club in Orangeville

A Side
Mark Kean
BYE
**Peter Corner**	**7**
Bowie Abbis-Mills	6
**Ian MacAulay**	**10**
Sean Aune	4
**Jake Higgs**	**6**
Brian Lewis	3
A5	Joe Frans
A5	BYE
A6	**Daryl Shane**	**6**
A6	Don Bowser	5
A7	**Mike Anderson**	**8**
A7	Cory Heggestad	2
A8	Greg Balsdon
A8	BYE

Quarterfinals
A1	**Mark Kean**	**6**
A2	Peter Corner	4
A3	Ian MacAulay	1
A4	**Jake Higgs**	**6**
A5	**Joe Frans**	**5**
A6	Daryl Shane	3
A7	Mike Anderson	2
A8	**Greg Balsdon**	**6**

Semifinals
A9	Mark Kean	4
A10	**Jake Higgs**	**6**
A11	Joe Frans	4
A12	**Greg Balsdon**	**7**

Finals
A13	**Jake Higgs**	**8**
A14	Greg Balsdon	6

B Side (Top half)
A1	BYE
A2	Bowie Abbis-Mills
A3	**Sean Aune**	**6**
A4	Brian Lewis	2

Semifinals
A12	Mike Anderson	5
B1	**Bowie Abbis-Mills**	**6**
A11	Daryl Shane	7
B2	**Sean Aune**	**9**

Finals
B5	**Bowie Abbis-Mills**	**9**
B6	Sean Aune	5

B Side (Bottom half)
A5	BYE
A6	Don Bowser
A7	Cory Heggestad
A8	BYE

Semifinals
A10	**Ian MacAulay**	**9**
B3	Don Bowser	3
A9	Peter Corner	4
B4	**Cory Heggestad**	**11**

Finals
B7	**Ian MacAulay**	**11**
B8	Cory Heggestad	3

B Side			Semifinal			**Final**
						A15	Greg Balsdon	4
A13	**Mark Kean**	**8**				B13	**Joe Frans**	**10**
B9	Bowie Abbis-Mills	6	B11	Mark Kean	4
A14	**Joe Frans**	**7**	B12	**Joe Frans**	**8**
B10	Ian MacAulay	3
