= Dayna Deruelle =

Canadian curler from Brampton, Ontario

- Curler
- Born: June 17, 1982 (age 44); Toronto, Ontario

Team
- Curling club: Harriston CC, Harriston, ON
- Skip: Brent Ross
- Third: Dayna Deruelle
- Second: Ryan Werenich
- Lead: Shawn Kaufman

Curling career
- Member Association: Ontario
- Brier: 0
- Top CTRS ranking: 17th (2016–17)

Dayna Deruelle (born June 17, 1982) is a Canadian curler from Brampton, Ontario. He currently plays third for team Brent Ross on the World Curling Tour.

His team competes in various events on the Ontario Curling Tour throughout the season and competes annually in the Ontario Curling Association Dominion Tankard play downs. Deruelle and his teammates Andrew McGaugh, Kevin Lagerquist and Evan DeViller enjoyed some success in their first season as a team when they qualified to represent Region 3 in the 2012 Ontario Dominion Tankard in Stratford, Ontario. Furthermore, the team qualified for the playoffs after finishing 5-5 in the round robin and winning a tie-breaker.

In 2013, Team Deruelle once again qualified to represent Region 3 in 2013 Ontario Dominion Tankard, this time being played at the Barrie Molson Centre in Barrie, ON. The foursome started the week slow but climbed back to a respectable 4-6 record to finish off the championships.

Deruelle joined the Jake Walker rink at third in 2013. With Team Walker, he finished fourth at the 2014 provincial championship, but they failed to make it back in 2015. Deruelle left the team after that season to form his own rink with Kevin Flewwelling, David Staples and Sean Harrison. The team made it to the 2016 Ontario Tankard, finishing 4-6. The next season, at the 2017 Ontario Tankard, they won one fewer game, finishing 3-6. The team played in the 2017 Olympic Pre-Trials, where they lost in a tiebreaker. The team failed to qualify for the 2018 Tankard, and broke up after the season.

In 2018, Deruelle formed a new team with Brent Ross, Ryan Werenich and Shawn Kaufman. They qualified for the 2019 Ontario Tankard, where Deruelle led the team to a 4–5 record. The team didn't make it to provincials again until 2023.

== Personal life ==
Deruelle is employed as a sales executive for Grand Slam Media. He is married to Nicole Deruelle.

== Teammates ==
Season	Skip	Third	Second	Lead
2011-12	Dayna Deruelle	Andrew McGaugh	Kevin Lagerquist	Evan DeViller
2012-13	Dayna Deruelle	Andrew McGaugh	Kevin Lagerquist	Evan DeViller
2013-14	Jake Walker	Dayna Deruelle	Andrew McGaugh	Mike McGaugh
2014-15	Jake Walker	Dayna Deruelle	Andrew McGaugh	Mike McGaugh
2015-16	Dayna Deruelle	Kevin Flewwelling	David Staples	Sean Harrison
2016-17	Dayna Deruelle	Kevin Flewwelling	David Staples	Sean Harrison
2017-18	Dayna Deruelle	Kevin Flewwelling	David Staples	Sean Harrison
2018-19	Dayna Deruelle	Brent Ross	Ryan Werenich	Shawn Kaufman
2019-20	Dayna Deruelle	Brent Ross	Ryan Werenich	Shawn Kaufman
2020-21	Dayna Deruelle	Brent Ross	Ryan Werenich	Shawn Kaufman
2021-22	Dayna Deruelle	Brent Ross	Ryan Werenich	Shawn Kaufman
2022-23	Dayna Deruelle	Brent Ross	Ryan Werenich	Shawn Kaufman
2023-24	Dayna Deruelle	Brent Ross	Ryan Werenich	Shawn Kaufman
2024-25	Brent Ross	Dayna Deruelle	Ryan Werenich	Shawn Kaufman

== 2012-13 Results ==
Event	Wins	Losses	Place
OCT Championships	2	2	DNQ
Stroud Sleeman Cash	4	3	QF
Huron ReproGraphics Oil Heritage Classic	4	3	SF
Elora Cash	3	1	SF
North Key Construction Men's Open	5	0	C
Co-operators Cup	1	2	DNQ
Brantford Nissan Classic	5	2	SF
Zone 9 Playdowns	2	0	A Side
Region 3 Playdowns	3	1	B Side
The Dominion Tankard	4	6	7th (tie)

== 2011-12 Results ==
Event	Wins	Losses	Place
Ingersoll Clash	-	-	DNQ
Barrie Sleeman Cash	-	-	DNQ
Elora Cash	5	1	C
Co-operators Cup	-	-	DNQ
Brantford Nissan Classic	3	2	CW
Zone 9 Playdowns	4	1	B Side
Region 3 Playdowns	4	1	B Side
The Dominion Tankard	6	6	4th

C = Champions
F = Finalist
SF = Semi-Finalist
QF = Quarter=-Finalist
CW = Consolation Winner
A Side = A Event Qualifier
B Side = B Event Qualifier
DNQ = Did not qualify
