= Brent Ross =

Canadian curler (born 1970)

- Curler
- Born: September 30, 1970 (age 56); Harriston, Ontario

Team
- Curling club: Harriston Curling Club, Harriston, ON
- Skip: Brent Ross
- Third: Dayna Deruelle
- Second: Ryan Werenich
- Lead: Shawn Kaufman

Curling career
- Member Association: Ontario

Brent Ross (born September 30, 1970) is a Canadian curler from Harriston, Ontario. He currently skips a team on the World Curling Tour.

== Career ==
Early in his career, Ross won the Ontario Colts Championship in 1997. Ross skipped his own rink on the World Curling Tour until 2007, when he joined the Jake Higgs rink, playing third on the team for the 2007–08 season, and then throwing fourth rocks (with Higgs throwing third) until 2014. The team played in their first Grand Slam of Curling event at the 2010 Players' Championship, where they lost all of their games. The next season, they played in the 2010 World Cup of Curling (now known as the Masters), going 2-3 and at the January 2011 Canadian Open, going 2-3 again. They didn't play in any slams during the 2011–12 season, but won the Barrie Sleeman Cash Spiel on the Ontario Curling Tour. The team played in two slams during the 2012–13 curling season, going winless at the 2012 Masters, and losing in a tiebreaker at the 2012 Canadian Open. In their last season together, the team won the 2013 Huron ReproGraphics Oil Heritage Classic, then just an event on the Ontario Tour. They didn't play any slams that season, but played in the 2013 Canadian Olympic Curling Pre-Trials in an attempt to represent Canada at the 2018 Winter Olympics. There, they finished with a 3-3 record, being eliminated from the triple knockout tournament.

In 2014, Ross began skipping his own team, which he did until joining the Dayna Deruelle rink in 2018 with Ryan Werenich and Shawn Kaufman. They qualified for the 2019 Ontario Tankard, where Deruelle led the team to a 4–5 record. The team didn't make it to provincials again until 2023, where they finished with a 1-4 record. Ross began skipping the team in the 2024–25 curling season, where the team qualified for the 2025 Ontario Tankard and finished with a 2–3 record.
