= Darryl Prebble =

Canadian curler

Darryl Prebble (born March 9, 1978) is a Canadian curler.

Prebble has curled off and on the World Curling Tour since 1999. He has played with skips such as Pat Ferris, Greg Balsdon, Peter Steski, Peter Corner and John Epping. He also skipped in his own right from 2008 to 2010. He currently skips a team on the Ontario Curling Tour.

Prebble has played in three Grand Slam events, all as John Epping's second in the 2010-11 curling season. His first Grand Slam was the 2010 Swiss Chalet National where the Epping rink missed the playoffs with a 2-3 record. Their next Grand Slam was the 2011 BDO Canadian Open where they again finished the round robin with a 2-3 record. However, this was good enough for a tie breaker, which the team lost to Rob Fowler. Prebble's final slam was at the 2011 Players' Championship where the team was eliminated in four games after posting just one win. After that season, Prebble went on to play lead for Peter Corner, but has not played in any Slams since. In 2012, Prebble left the Corner rink.

Prebble has been to four provincial championships, skipping in one of them, the 2013 Dominion Tankard.
