= Mark Bice =

Canadian curler

- Curler
- Born: October 10, 1984 (age 42); Sarnia, Ontario

Team
- Curling club: Sarnia G&CC, Sarnia, ON

Curling career
- Member Association: Ontario
- Brier: 1 (2014)
- Top CTRS ranking: 13th (2013-14)

Mark Bice (born October 10, 1984, in Sarnia, Ontario) is a Canadian curler. He used to skip a team on the World Curling Tour. He won the Ontario Tankard in 2014 and represented the province at the 2014 Tim Hortons Brier.

== Career ==
Bice had a fairly successful junior career. Bice is a two time provincial junior champion, winning in 2003 and 2005 and was a provincial schoolboy champion in 2002. In 2003, his rink of Mike Callan, Rob Pruliere and Jeff Wilson finished with a 7–5 record at the Canadian Junior Curling Championships- out of the playoffs.

In 2005, they went to the Canadian Juniors again, this time with Codey Maus replacing Callan. The team finished second after the round robin with a 9–3 record. After defeating Ian Fitzner-LeBlanc's Nova Scotia rink in the semi-final, Bice lost in the final match, against Saskatchewan's Kyle George.

After his 2005 Junior run, Bice was picked up to play third for Heath McCormick's rink. He would be demoted to lead the following season. In 2007, he switched to play third for Pat Ferris. In 2008, he formed his own team of John Grant, Steve Bice and Jeff Grant. Jeff Grant left the team in 2009, and was replaced by Codey Maus.

In 2009, Bice won the provincial Mixed title, qualifying his rink that included Leslie Bishop, Codey Maus and Courtney Davies for the 2010 Canadian Mixed Curling Championship. At the 2010 Mixed, the team placed second after the round robin. They beat British Columbia's Jason Montgomery in the semi-final, but lost in the final to Nova Scotia's Mark Dacey rink.

Bice joined the Greg Balsdon rink in 2012. Bice skipped the rink through zone and regional play of the 2014 Travelers Tankard, while Balsdon recovered from a broken rib. Balsdon rejoined the team after they qualified for the Tankard, the provincial men's championship. While Balsdon skipped the team, the team would be named for Bice. The team won the event, and represented Ontario at the 2014 Tim Hortons Brier, finishing the event with a 4–7 record.

Bice left the Balsdon rink in 2015, and formed his own team consisting Aaron Squires, Tyler Morgan and brother Steve Bice. They played in the 2016 Ontario Tankard, but finished with a poor 3–7 record. They had a better record at the 2017 Ontario Tankard, where they went 4–5. Later that year, they played in the 2017 Canadian Olympic Pre-trials, but failed to make the playoffs, finishing with a 2–4 record. The team made it to the 2018 Ontario Tankard, but just missed out on qualifying for the playoffs. The next season, the team added Codey Maus to the lineup, and qualified for the 2019 Ontario Tankard. At the 2019 Tankard, they finished with a 1–8 record, in last place

== Personal life ==
Bice is employed as a process operator for Imperial Oil. He is married to Courtney Bice. His brother Steve was a member of his 2014 Brier team.

== Grand Slam record ==
Key
C	Champion
F	Lost in Final
SF	Lost in Semifinal
QF	Lost in Quarterfinals
R16	Lost in the round of 16
Q	Did not advance to playoffs
T2	Played in Tier 2 event
DNP	Did not participate in event
N/A	Not a Grand Slam event that season

Event	2010–11	2011–12	2012–13
Masters	DNP	DNP	QF
Canadian Open	Q	DNP	DNP
The National	DNP	DNP	Q
Players'	DNP	DNP	Q
