= Steve Bice =

Canadian curler from Milton, Ontario

Stephen Bice
- Curler
- Born: October 5, 1981 (age 45); Sarnia, Ontario

Team
- Curling club: Sarnia G&CC, Sarnia, ON
- Skip: Mark Bice
- Third: Aaron Squires
- Second: Tyler Morgan
- Lead: Codey Maus
- Alternate: Steve Bice

Curling career
- Member Association: Ontario
- Brier: 5 (2007, 2008, 2009, 2010, 2014)
Medal record
World Curling Championships
Gold medal – first place	2007 Edmonton
Tim Hortons Brier
Gold medal – first place	2007 Hamilton
Silver medal – second place	2008 Winnipeg
Silver medal – second place	2010 Halifax
Bronze medal – third place	2009 Calgary

Stephen "Steve" Bice (born October 5, 1981, in Sarnia, Ontario) is a Canadian curler from Milton, Ontario. He is currently the alternate for his brother Mark's rink.

== Career ==
Bice was a former alternate on Glenn Howard's team.

The 2007 Ontario Men's Curling Championship took place in Bice's hometown of Sarnia. Bice was on the spare list, and when Howard's second Brent Laing had to leave the tournament because his wife was giving birth, Bice was picked up to play on the team. The team won the provincials, and he was kept for the 2007 Tim Hortons Brier, which the team also won. He capped off the season by winning the 2007 Ford World Men's Curling Championship. Bice would remain on as alternate for the 2008, 2009 and 2010 Tim Hortons Briers. He threw just a combined 17 shots in all four Briers.

Bice will return to the Brier once again as an alternate, this time for Greg Balsdon. The team won the 2014 Travelers Tankard and will play in the 2014 Tim Hortons Brier.

== Personal life ==
Bice is employed as a chemical technician for Ontario Power Generation. He is married and has one child.
