= Jake Higgs =

Canadian curler

- Curler
- Born: December 20, 1975 (age 50); Regina, Saskatchewan

Team
- Curling club: Glencoe & District CC, Glencoe, ON; Iqaluit CC, Iqaluit, NU

Curling career
- Member Association: Ontario (1998–2018; 2019); Nunavut (2017–2023)
- Brier: 2 (2020, 2023)
- Top CTRS ranking: 19th (2014–15)

Jake Higgs (born December 20, 1975, in Regina, Saskatchewan) is a Canadian curler from Strathroy, Ontario. He coached the mixed doubles rink of Matt Hamilton and Becca Hamilton at the 2018 Winter Olympics. He currently coaches the Sam Mooibroek rink.

== Curling career ==
Higgs played second for Wayne Tuck, Jr.'s mixed team, that won a provincial championship in 2008–09, giving them the right to represent Ontario at the 2009 Canadian Mixed Curling Championship. The team lost in the final to Sean Grassie's Manitoba rink. Higgs was also a member of the team that won the 2002 provincial mixed championship.

Higgs began skipping a men's team in 2008, which finished fourth place at the 2009 provincial championship. In 2010, his team played in its first Grand Slam event, losing three straight before being eliminated at the 2010 Players' Championships.

Higgs continued to skip his own rink until 2014, when he joined the Robert Rumfeldt rink, throwing lead stones for the team for one season. He went back to skipping in 2015 for two seasons before being chosen to coach USA Curling.

In 2017, he began skipping an Iqaluit-based team and won the 2020 Nunavut Brier Playdowns and represented Nunavut at the 2020 Tim Hortons Brier where they finished with a 0–7 record. Representing Nunavut again at the 2023 Tim Hortons Brier, Higgs defeated Nathan Young's Newfoundland and Labrador team to earn the territory's first ever win at the national men's curling championship.

== Personal life ==
Higgs works as a high school teacher for the Thames Valley District School Board. He is married to Sara Gatchell and has two children.

== Grand Slam record ==
Key
C	Champion
F	Lost in Final
SF	Lost in Semifinal
QF	Lost in Quarterfinals
R16	Lost in the round of 16
Q	Did not advance to playoffs
T2	Played in Tier 2 event
DNP	Did not participate in event
N/A	Not a Grand Slam event that season

Event	2009–10	2010–11	2011–12	2012–13	2013–14	2014–15
Masters / World Cup	DNP	Q	DNP	Q	DNP	DNP
Canadian Open	DNP	Q	DNP	Q	DNP	DNP
The National	DNP	DNP	DNP	DNP	DNP	Q
Players' Championships	Q	DNP	DNP	DNP	DNP	DNP
