= 2014 Travelers Tankard =

- Host city: Smiths Falls, Ontario
- Arena: Smiths Falls Community Memorial Centre
- Dates: January 27-February 2
- Winner: Mark Bice
- Curling club: Glendale G&CC, Hamilton
- Skip: Greg Balsdon
- Third: Mark Bice
- Second: Tyler Morgan
- Lead: Jamie Farnell
- Alternate: Steve Bice
- Finalist: Glenn Howard

The 2014 Travelers Tankard, southern Ontario's men's provincial curling championship, was held from January 27 to February 2 at the Smiths Falls Community Memorial Centre in Smiths Falls, Ontario. The winning Mark Bice team (skipped by Greg Balsdon) represented Ontario at the 2014 Tim Hortons Brier in Kamloops, British Columbia.

== Teams ==
| Skip | Third | Second | Lead | Alternate | Club(s) |
|---|---|---|---|---|---|
| Shannon Beddows | John Bolton | Terry Jenkins | Dave Farr | | Cannington Curling Club, Cannington |
| *Greg Balsdon (skip) | *Mark Bice (team name) | Tyler Morgan | Jamie Farnell | Steve Bice | Glendale Golf & Country Club, Hamilton |
| Mathew Camm (fourth) | Jason Camm | Brad Kidd | Bryan Cochrane (skip) | | City View Curling Club, Nepean, Ottawa |
| John Epping | Scott Bailey | David Mathers | Collin Mitchell | Trevor Wall | Donalda Curling Club, Don Mills, Toronto |
| Brent Ross (fourth) | Jake Higgs (skip) | Codey Maus | Bill Buchanan | | Glencoe & District Curling Club, Glencoe |
| Mark Homan | Jeff Guignard | Paul Winford | Ron Hrycak | | Ottawa Curling Club, Ottawa |
| Glenn Howard | Wayne Middaugh | Brent Laing | Craig Savill | | Penetanguishene Curling Club, Penetanguishene |
| Rob Lobel | Steven Lobel | Patrick Greenman | Ted Anderson | | Thornhill Golf & Country Club, Thornhill |
| Robert Rumfeldt | Adam Spencer | Scott Howard | Scott Hodgson | | Collingwood Curling Club, Collingwood |
| Craig Van Ymeren | Matt Mapletoft | Scott Brandon | Shane Konings | | St. Thomas Curling Club, St. Thomas |
| Jake Walker | Dayna Deruelle | Andrew McGaugh | Michael McGaugh | | Chinguacousy Curling Club, Brampton |

*Mark Bice skipped the team through the Zone and Regional playdowns, and thus the team was named after him. Greg Balsdon returned to the lineup as Skip for the Provincial Championship after missing 2 months due to injury. The team plays as a 5-man squad regularly during the Tour season.

== Round robin standings ==
Key
| Teams to Playoffs |

| Skip (Club) | W | L | PF | PA | Ends Won | Ends Lost | Blank Ends | Stolen Ends |
|---|---|---|---|---|---|---|---|---|
| Mark Bice (Glendale) | 8 | 2 | 71 | 56 | 42 | 35 | 13 | 10 |
| Glenn Howard (Penetanguishene) | 7 | 3 | 74 | 38 | 37 | 29 | 11 | 10 |
| Jake Walker (Chinguacousy) | 6 | 4 | 52 | 56 | 41 | 31 | 20 | 8 |
| Bryan Cochrane (City View) | 6 | 4 | 80 | 63 | 39 | 38 | 5 | 10 |
| Craig Van Ymeren (St. Thomas) | 5 | 5 | 73 | 68 | 44 | 38 | 8 | 14 |
| Mark Homan (Ottawa) | 5 | 5 | 61 | 61 | 43 | 38 | 15 | 16 |
| John Epping (Donalda) | 5 | 5 | 59 | 71 | 37 | 43 | 16 | 5 |
| Robert Rumfeldt (Collingwood) | 5 | 5 | 67 | 60 | 37 | 36 | 8 | 7 |
| Jake Higgs (Glencoe) | 3 | 7 | 57 | 70 | 34 | 49 | 10 | 9 |
| Rob Lobel (Thornhill) | 3 | 7 | 56 | 78 | 40 | 44 | 7 | 9 |
| Shannon Beddows (Cannington) | 2 | 8 | 54 | 82 | 35 | 41 | 7 | 10 |

== Results ==
=== Draw 1 ===
January 27, 14:00

| Sheet A | 1 | 2 | 3 | 4 | 5 | 6 | 7 | 8 | 9 | 10 | 11 | Final |
|---|---|---|---|---|---|---|---|---|---|---|---|---|
| Higgs 🔨 | 0 | 2 | 0 | 0 | 2 | 0 | 1 | 1 | 0 | 0 | 0 | 6 |
| Bice | 0 | 0 | 2 | 1 | 0 | 1 | 0 | 0 | 1 | 1 | 1 | 7 |

| Sheet B | 1 | 2 | 3 | 4 | 5 | 6 | 7 | 8 | 9 | 10 | Final |
|---|---|---|---|---|---|---|---|---|---|---|---|
| Rumfeldt 🔨 | 0 | 2 | 0 | 2 | 0 | 1 | 0 | 1 | 0 | 1 | 7 |
| Howard | 0 | 0 | 1 | 0 | 2 | 0 | 1 | 0 | 2 | 0 | 6 |

| Sheet C | 1 | 2 | 3 | 4 | 5 | 6 | 7 | 8 | 9 | 10 | Final |
|---|---|---|---|---|---|---|---|---|---|---|---|
| Walker | 0 | 0 | 0 | 1 | 0 | 1 | 0 | 0 | 0 | X | 2 |
| Van Ymeren 🔨 | 0 | 1 | 2 | 0 | 2 | 0 | 1 | 0 | 1 | X | 7 |

| Sheet D | 1 | 2 | 3 | 4 | 5 | 6 | 7 | 8 | 9 | 10 | Final |
|---|---|---|---|---|---|---|---|---|---|---|---|
| Beddows 🔨 | 1 | 0 | 2 | 0 | 2 | 0 | 2 | 1 | 0 | X | 8 |
| Lobel | 0 | 1 | 0 | 1 | 0 | 1 | 0 | 0 | 1 | X | 4 |

| Sheet E | 1 | 2 | 3 | 4 | 5 | 6 | 7 | 8 | 9 | 10 | Final |
|---|---|---|---|---|---|---|---|---|---|---|---|
| Cochrane | 0 | 2 | 0 | 1 | 0 | 1 | 0 | 0 | 0 | X | 4 |
| Homan 🔨 | 1 | 0 | 1 | 0 | 2 | 0 | 1 | 1 | 1 | X | 7 |

=== Draw 2 ===
January 27, 19:30

| Sheet A | 1 | 2 | 3 | 4 | 5 | 6 | 7 | 8 | 9 | 10 | Final |
|---|---|---|---|---|---|---|---|---|---|---|---|
| Van Ymeren | 0 | 0 | 2 | 1 | 2 | 0 | 2 | 0 | 2 | X | 9 |
| Lobel 🔨 | 0 | 2 | 0 | 0 | 0 | 2 | 0 | 2 | 0 | X | 6 |

| Sheet B | 1 | 2 | 3 | 4 | 5 | 6 | 7 | 8 | 9 | 10 | Final |
|---|---|---|---|---|---|---|---|---|---|---|---|
| Cochrane 🔨 | 0 | 0 | 0 | 3 | 0 | 2 | 0 | X | X | X | 5 |
| Rumfeldt | 1 | 3 | 2 | 0 | 4 | 0 | 1 | X | X | X | 11 |

| Sheet C | 1 | 2 | 3 | 4 | 5 | 6 | 7 | 8 | 9 | 10 | Final |
|---|---|---|---|---|---|---|---|---|---|---|---|
| Bice | 0 | 0 | 2 | 0 | 0 | 0 | 1 | 2 | 0 | 3 | 8 |
| Homan 🔨 | 0 | 1 | 0 | 2 | 1 | 0 | 0 | 0 | 1 | 0 | 5 |

| Sheet D | 1 | 2 | 3 | 4 | 5 | 6 | 7 | 8 | 9 | 10 | 11 | Final |
|---|---|---|---|---|---|---|---|---|---|---|---|---|
| Higgs | 0 | 0 | 1 | 1 | 0 | 1 | 0 | 1 | 0 | 1 | 0 | 5 |
| Epping 🔨 | 2 | 1 | 0 | 0 | 1 | 0 | 0 | 0 | 1 | 0 | 1 | 6 |

| Sheet E | 1 | 2 | 3 | 4 | 5 | 6 | 7 | 8 | 9 | 10 | Final |
|---|---|---|---|---|---|---|---|---|---|---|---|
| Walker | 0 | 1 | 0 | 1 | 0 | 0 | X | X | X | X | 2 |
| Howard 🔨 | 5 | 0 | 2 | 0 | 0 | 1 | X | X | X | X | 8 |

=== Draw 3 ===
January 28, 14:00

| Sheet A | 1 | 2 | 3 | 4 | 5 | 6 | 7 | 8 | 9 | 10 | 11 | Final |
|---|---|---|---|---|---|---|---|---|---|---|---|---|
| Homan | 0 | 2 | 0 | 2 | 0 | 0 | 0 | 0 | 0 | 2 | 2 | 8 |
| Epping 🔨 | 2 | 0 | 1 | 0 | 0 | 2 | 1 | 0 | 0 | 0 | 0 | 6 |

| Sheet B | 1 | 2 | 3 | 4 | 5 | 6 | 7 | 8 | 9 | 10 | 11 | Final |
|---|---|---|---|---|---|---|---|---|---|---|---|---|
| Walker 🔨 | 2 | 0 | 0 | 1 | 0 | 1 | 0 | 1 | 0 | 1 | 2 | 8 |
| Cochrane | 0 | 1 | 0 | 0 | 1 | 0 | 2 | 0 | 2 | 0 | 0 | 6 |

| Sheet C | 1 | 2 | 3 | 4 | 5 | 6 | 7 | 8 | 9 | 10 | Final |
|---|---|---|---|---|---|---|---|---|---|---|---|
| Lobel | 0 | 0 | 1 | 0 | 1 | 0 | X | X | X | X | 2 |
| Howard 🔨 | 2 | 1 | 0 | 5 | 0 | 2 | X | X | X | X | 10 |

| Sheet D | 1 | 2 | 3 | 4 | 5 | 6 | 7 | 8 | 9 | 10 | Final |
|---|---|---|---|---|---|---|---|---|---|---|---|
| Van Ymeren 🔨 | 2 | 0 | 0 | 0 | 2 | 0 | 0 | 3 | 1 | X | 8 |
| Beddows | 0 | 1 | 2 | 2 | 0 | 0 | 1 | 0 | 0 | X | 6 |

| Sheet E | 1 | 2 | 3 | 4 | 5 | 6 | 7 | 8 | 9 | 10 | Final |
|---|---|---|---|---|---|---|---|---|---|---|---|
| Bice | 0 | 1 | 0 | 1 | 0 | 1 | 0 | X | X | X | 3 |
| Rumfeldt 🔨 | 1 | 0 | 2 | 0 | 2 | 0 | 4 | X | X | X | 9 |

=== Draw 4 ===
January 28, 19:00

| Sheet A | 1 | 2 | 3 | 4 | 5 | 6 | 7 | 8 | 9 | 10 | Final |
|---|---|---|---|---|---|---|---|---|---|---|---|
| Howard 🔨 | 2 | 1 | 0 | 4 | 1 | 0 | 2 | X | X | X | 10 |
| Beddows | 0 | 0 | 2 | 0 | 0 | 2 | 0 | X | X | X | 4 |

| Sheet B | 1 | 2 | 3 | 4 | 5 | 6 | 7 | 8 | 9 | 10 | Final |
|---|---|---|---|---|---|---|---|---|---|---|---|
| Bice 🔨 | 0 | 2 | 0 | 0 | 2 | 0 | 0 | 0 | 3 | X | 7 |
| Walker | 1 | 0 | 0 | 1 | 0 | 0 | 1 | 0 | 0 | X | 3 |

| Sheet C | 1 | 2 | 3 | 4 | 5 | 6 | 7 | 8 | 9 | 10 | Final |
|---|---|---|---|---|---|---|---|---|---|---|---|
| Epping | 0 | 2 | 0 | 2 | 0 | 3 | 0 | 0 | 0 | 1 | 8 |
| Rumfeldt 🔨 | 2 | 0 | 1 | 0 | 2 | 0 | 0 | 0 | 1 | 0 | 6 |

| Sheet D | 1 | 2 | 3 | 4 | 5 | 6 | 7 | 8 | 9 | 10 | 11 | Final |
|---|---|---|---|---|---|---|---|---|---|---|---|---|
| Homan 🔨 | 1 | 2 | 0 | 1 | 0 | 0 | 2 | 0 | 2 | 0 | 1 | 9 |
| Higgs | 0 | 0 | 1 | 0 | 2 | 2 | 0 | 0 | 0 | 3 | 0 | 8 |

| Sheet E | 1 | 2 | 3 | 4 | 5 | 6 | 7 | 8 | 9 | 10 | Final |
|---|---|---|---|---|---|---|---|---|---|---|---|
| Lobel | 0 | 0 | 0 | 0 | 1 | 0 | X | X | X | X | 1 |
| Cochrane 🔨 | 1 | 1 | 1 | 3 | 0 | 2 | X | X | X | X | 8 |

=== Draw 5 ===
January 29, 09:00

| Sheet A | 1 | 2 | 3 | 4 | 5 | 6 | 7 | 8 | 9 | 10 | Final |
|---|---|---|---|---|---|---|---|---|---|---|---|
| Rumfeldt 🔨 | 0 | 3 | 0 | 3 | 0 | 2 | X | X | X | X | 8 |
| Higgs | 0 | 0 | 1 | 0 | 1 | 0 | X | X | X | X | 2 |

| Sheet B | 1 | 2 | 3 | 4 | 5 | 6 | 7 | 8 | 9 | 10 | 11 | Final |
|---|---|---|---|---|---|---|---|---|---|---|---|---|
| Lobel | 0 | 2 | 0 | 1 | 0 | 1 | 0 | 0 | 0 | 2 | 0 | 6 |
| Bice 🔨 | 1 | 0 | 1 | 0 | 3 | 0 | 0 | 0 | 1 | 0 | 2 | 8 |

| Sheet C | 1 | 2 | 3 | 4 | 5 | 6 | 7 | 8 | 9 | 10 | Final |
|---|---|---|---|---|---|---|---|---|---|---|---|
| Beddows | 0 | 0 | 1 | 1 | 0 | 0 | 1 | 0 | X | X | 3 |
| Cochrane 🔨 | 0 | 3 | 0 | 0 | 2 | 2 | 0 | 3 | X | X | 10 |

| Sheet D | 1 | 2 | 3 | 4 | 5 | 6 | 7 | 8 | 9 | 10 | Final |
|---|---|---|---|---|---|---|---|---|---|---|---|
| Howard | 0 | 3 | 0 | 2 | 0 | 3 | 0 | X | X | X | 8 |
| Van Ymeren 🔨 | 1 | 0 | 1 | 0 | 2 | 0 | 1 | X | X | X | 5 |

| Sheet E | 1 | 2 | 3 | 4 | 5 | 6 | 7 | 8 | 9 | 10 | Final |
|---|---|---|---|---|---|---|---|---|---|---|---|
| Epping | 0 | 0 | 0 | 2 | 0 | 2 | 0 | 3 | 0 | 1 | 8 |
| Walker 🔨 | 0 | 0 | 1 | 0 | 2 | 0 | 1 | 0 | 2 | 0 | 6 |

=== Draw 6 ===
January 29, 14:00

| Sheet A | 1 | 2 | 3 | 4 | 5 | 6 | 7 | 8 | 9 | 10 | Final |
|---|---|---|---|---|---|---|---|---|---|---|---|
| Cochrane | 1 | 2 | 0 | 4 | 0 | 0 | 3 | 0 | 4 | X | 14 |
| Van Ymeren 🔨 | 0 | 0 | 2 | 0 | 2 | 1 | 0 | 4 | 0 | X | 9 |

| Sheet B | 1 | 2 | 3 | 4 | 5 | 6 | 7 | 8 | 9 | 10 | Final |
|---|---|---|---|---|---|---|---|---|---|---|---|
| Epping | 0 | 1 | 0 | 4 | 0 | 1 | 0 | 0 | 0 | X | 6 |
| Lobel 🔨 | 1 | 0 | 1 | 0 | 1 | 0 | 1 | 2 | 3 | X | 9 |

| Sheet C | 1 | 2 | 3 | 4 | 5 | 6 | 7 | 8 | 9 | 10 | Final |
|---|---|---|---|---|---|---|---|---|---|---|---|
| Higgs | 0 | 0 | 0 | 0 | 0 | 0 | 0 | 0 | X | X | 0 |
| Walker 🔨 | 0 | 1 | 0 | 1 | 1 | 1 | 0 | 1 | X | X | 5 |

| Sheet D | 1 | 2 | 3 | 4 | 5 | 6 | 7 | 8 | 9 | 10 | Final |
|---|---|---|---|---|---|---|---|---|---|---|---|
| Rumfeldt 🔨 | 0 | 0 | 1 | 0 | 0 | 0 | X | X | X | X | 1 |
| Homan | 0 | 1 | 0 | 4 | 1 | 3 | X | X | X | X | 9 |

| Sheet E | 1 | 2 | 3 | 4 | 5 | 6 | 7 | 8 | 9 | 10 | Final |
|---|---|---|---|---|---|---|---|---|---|---|---|
| Beddows | 0 | 0 | 1 | 0 | 2 | 0 | X | X | X | X | 3 |
| Bice 🔨 | 3 | 2 | 0 | 4 | 0 | 2 | X | X | X | X | 11 |

=== Draw 7 ===
January 29, 19:00

| Sheet A | 1 | 2 | 3 | 4 | 5 | 6 | 7 | 8 | 9 | 10 | Final |
|---|---|---|---|---|---|---|---|---|---|---|---|
| Walker 🔨 | 0 | 2 | 0 | 0 | 0 | 0 | 0 | 0 | 0 | 2 | 4 |
| Homan | 0 | 0 | 1 | 1 | 0 | 0 | 1 | 0 | 0 | 0 | 3 |

| Sheet B | 1 | 2 | 3 | 4 | 5 | 6 | 7 | 8 | 9 | 10 | Final |
|---|---|---|---|---|---|---|---|---|---|---|---|
| Beddows | 0 | 0 | 0 | 0 | 1 | 1 | 0 | 0 | 1 | X | 3 |
| Epping 🔨 | 1 | 2 | 0 | 0 | 0 | 0 | 2 | 0 | 0 | X | 5 |

| Sheet C | 1 | 2 | 3 | 4 | 5 | 6 | 7 | 8 | 9 | 10 | Final |
|---|---|---|---|---|---|---|---|---|---|---|---|
| Van Ymeren | 1 | 0 | 0 | 2 | 0 | 2 | 0 | 0 | 0 | 0 | 5 |
| Bice 🔨 | 0 | 0 | 1 | 0 | 1 | 0 | 2 | 2 | 0 | 2 | 8 |

| Sheet D | 1 | 2 | 3 | 4 | 5 | 6 | 7 | 8 | 9 | 10 | Final |
|---|---|---|---|---|---|---|---|---|---|---|---|
| Cochrane | 0 | 1 | 0 | 0 | 2 | 0 | X | X | X | X | 3 |
| Howard 🔨 | 3 | 0 | 3 | 0 | 0 | 4 | X | X | X | X | 10 |

| Sheet E | 1 | 2 | 3 | 4 | 5 | 6 | 7 | 8 | 9 | 10 | Final |
|---|---|---|---|---|---|---|---|---|---|---|---|
| Higgs | 0 | 0 | 2 | 1 | 1 | 0 | 4 | 0 | 0 | 1 | 9 |
| Lobel 🔨 | 1 | 1 | 0 | 0 | 0 | 1 | 0 | 2 | 2 | 0 | 7 |

=== Draw 8 ===
January 30, 14:00

| Sheet A | 1 | 2 | 3 | 4 | 5 | 6 | 7 | 8 | 9 | 10 | Final |
|---|---|---|---|---|---|---|---|---|---|---|---|
| Bice | 0 | 0 | 2 | 0 | 0 | 1 | 0 | 1 | 0 | 1 | 5 |
| Howard 🔨 | 1 | 0 | 0 | 1 | 1 | 0 | 0 | 0 | 0 | 0 | 3 |

| Sheet B | 1 | 2 | 3 | 4 | 5 | 6 | 7 | 8 | 9 | 10 | Final |
|---|---|---|---|---|---|---|---|---|---|---|---|
| Higgs 🔨 | 0 | 0 | 3 | 2 | 0 | 0 | 2 | 0 | 0 | 5 | 12 |
| Beddows | 2 | 1 | 0 | 0 | 0 | 2 | 0 | 1 | 0 | 0 | 6 |

| Sheet C | 1 | 2 | 3 | 4 | 5 | 6 | 7 | 8 | 9 | 10 | 11 | Final |
|---|---|---|---|---|---|---|---|---|---|---|---|---|
| Homan | 2 | 0 | 1 | 0 | 0 | 2 | 0 | 1 | 0 | 0 | 0 | 6 |
| Lobel 🔨 | 0 | 0 | 0 | 1 | 1 | 0 | 2 | 0 | 1 | 1 | 1 | 7 |

| Sheet D | 1 | 2 | 3 | 4 | 5 | 6 | 7 | 8 | 9 | 10 | Final |
|---|---|---|---|---|---|---|---|---|---|---|---|
| Walker 🔨 | 0 | 0 | 1 | 0 | 1 | 1 | 0 | 1 | 0 | 1 | 5 |
| Rumfeldt | 0 | 1 | 0 | 1 | 0 | 0 | 2 | 0 | 0 | 0 | 4 |

| Sheet E | 1 | 2 | 3 | 4 | 5 | 6 | 7 | 8 | 9 | 10 | Final |
|---|---|---|---|---|---|---|---|---|---|---|---|
| Van Ymeren | 0 | 2 | 0 | 2 | 0 | 1 | 0 | 0 | 0 | 0 | 5 |
| Epping 🔨 | 2 | 0 | 0 | 0 | 2 | 0 | 1 | 0 | 1 | 1 | 7 |

=== Draw 9 ===
January 30, 19:00

| Sheet A | 1 | 2 | 3 | 4 | 5 | 6 | 7 | 8 | 9 | 10 | Final |
|---|---|---|---|---|---|---|---|---|---|---|---|
| Lobel | 0 | 4 | 2 | 0 | 0 | 1 | 0 | 1 | 0 | 1 | 9 |
| Rumfeldt 🔨 | 1 | 0 | 0 | 0 | 2 | 0 | 3 | 0 | 2 | 0 | 8 |

| Sheet B | 1 | 2 | 3 | 4 | 5 | 6 | 7 | 8 | 9 | 10 | Final |
|---|---|---|---|---|---|---|---|---|---|---|---|
| Van Ymeren | 0 | 0 | 1 | 2 | 0 | 1 | 1 | 0 | 1 | 0 | 6 |
| Higgs 🔨 | 1 | 2 | 0 | 0 | 1 | 0 | 0 | 2 | 0 | 1 | 7 |

| Sheet C | 1 | 2 | 3 | 4 | 5 | 6 | 7 | 8 | 9 | 10 | Final |
|---|---|---|---|---|---|---|---|---|---|---|---|
| Howard 🔨 | 0 | 2 | 2 | 0 | 0 | 2 | 0 | 2 | X | X | 8 |
| Epping | 0 | 0 | 0 | 0 | 2 | 0 | 1 | 0 | X | X | 3 |

| Sheet D | 1 | 2 | 3 | 4 | 5 | 6 | 7 | 8 | 9 | 10 | Final |
|---|---|---|---|---|---|---|---|---|---|---|---|
| Bice 🔨 | 0 | 2 | 0 | 1 | 0 | 1 | 0 | X | X | X | 4 |
| Cochrane | 1 | 0 | 3 | 0 | 3 | 0 | 3 | X | X | X | 10 |

| Sheet E | 1 | 2 | 3 | 4 | 5 | 6 | 7 | 8 | 9 | 10 | Final |
|---|---|---|---|---|---|---|---|---|---|---|---|
| Homan | 0 | 1 | 0 | 0 | 0 | 1 | 0 | X | X | X | 2 |
| Beddows 🔨 | 3 | 0 | 2 | 1 | 1 | 0 | 3 | X | X | X | 10 |

=== Draw 10 ===
January 31, 14:00

| Sheet A | 1 | 2 | 3 | 4 | 5 | 6 | 7 | 8 | 9 | 10 | Final |
|---|---|---|---|---|---|---|---|---|---|---|---|
| Epping 🔨 | 0 | 1 | 0 | 2 | 0 | 0 | 1 | 0 | 0 | X | 4 |
| Cochrane | 0 | 0 | 2 | 0 | 1 | 1 | 0 | 2 | 5 | X | 11 |

| Sheet B | 1 | 2 | 3 | 4 | 5 | 6 | 7 | 8 | 9 | 10 | Final |
|---|---|---|---|---|---|---|---|---|---|---|---|
| Homan 🔨 | 1 | 0 | 1 | 0 | 0 | 0 | 2 | 0 | 2 | 0 | 6 |
| Van Ymeren | 0 | 2 | 0 | 1 | 1 | 2 | 0 | 2 | 0 | 1 | 9 |

| Sheet C | 1 | 2 | 3 | 4 | 5 | 6 | 7 | 8 | 9 | 10 | Final |
|---|---|---|---|---|---|---|---|---|---|---|---|
| Rumfeldt 🔨 | 1 | 2 | 0 | 1 | 0 | 2 | 2 | 1 | X | X | 9 |
| Beddows | 0 | 0 | 2 | 0 | 1 | 0 | 0 | 0 | X | X | 3 |

| Sheet D | 1 | 2 | 3 | 4 | 5 | 6 | 7 | 8 | 9 | 10 | Final |
|---|---|---|---|---|---|---|---|---|---|---|---|
| Lobel | 0 | 1 | 0 | 2 | 0 | 1 | 0 | 1 | 0 | 0 | 5 |
| Walker 🔨 | 2 | 0 | 1 | 0 | 0 | 0 | 2 | 0 | 0 | 1 | 6 |

| Sheet E | 1 | 2 | 3 | 4 | 5 | 6 | 7 | 8 | 9 | 10 | Final |
|---|---|---|---|---|---|---|---|---|---|---|---|
| Howard | 0 | 2 | 1 | 0 | 1 | 2 | 1 | X | X | X | 7 |
| Higgs 🔨 | 0 | 0 | 0 | 1 | 0 | 0 | 0 | X | X | X | 1 |

=== Draw 11 ===
January 31, 19:00

| Sheet A | 1 | 2 | 3 | 4 | 5 | 6 | 7 | 8 | 9 | 10 | Final |
|---|---|---|---|---|---|---|---|---|---|---|---|
| Beddows | 0 | 1 | 0 | 1 | 1 | 0 | 2 | 0 | 3 | 0 | 8 |
| Walker 🔨 | 3 | 0 | 2 | 0 | 0 | 1 | 0 | 3 | 0 | 2 | 11 |

| Sheet B | 1 | 2 | 3 | 4 | 5 | 6 | 7 | 8 | 9 | 10 | Final |
|---|---|---|---|---|---|---|---|---|---|---|---|
| Howard 🔨 | 2 | 0 | 0 | 1 | 1 | 0 | 0 | 0 | 0 | 0 | 4 |
| Homan | 0 | 2 | 1 | 0 | 0 | 1 | 0 | 1 | 0 | 1 | 6 |

| Sheet C | 1 | 2 | 3 | 4 | 5 | 6 | 7 | 8 | 9 | 10 | Final |
|---|---|---|---|---|---|---|---|---|---|---|---|
| Cochrane 🔨 | 0 | 4 | 0 | 1 | 0 | 1 | 2 | 0 | 0 | 1 | 9 |
| Higgs | 0 | 0 | 2 | 0 | 2 | 0 | 0 | 1 | 1 | 0 | 6 |

| Sheet D | 1 | 2 | 3 | 4 | 5 | 6 | 7 | 8 | 9 | 10 | Final |
|---|---|---|---|---|---|---|---|---|---|---|---|
| Epping 🔨 | 1 | 0 | 1 | 0 | 2 | 0 | 0 | 2 | 0 | X | 6 |
| Bice | 0 | 4 | 0 | 2 | 0 | 1 | 1 | 0 | 2 | X | 10 |

| Sheet E | 1 | 2 | 3 | 4 | 5 | 6 | 7 | 8 | 9 | 10 | Final |
|---|---|---|---|---|---|---|---|---|---|---|---|
| Rumfeldt | 0 | 0 | 0 | 1 | 0 | 3 | 0 | X | X | X | 4 |
| Van Ymeren 🔨 | 2 | 1 | 4 | 0 | 1 | 0 | 2 | X | X | X | 10 |

== Playoffs ==
Page playoff system
1 | Mark Bice | 4
2 | Glenn Howard | 8
3 | Jake Walker | 4
4 | Bryan Cochrane | 7

Semifinal
1 | Mark Bice | 9
4 | Bryan Cochrane | 6

Final
2 | Glenn Howard | 5
1 | Mark Bice | 6

=== 1 vs. 2 ===
February 1, 14:00

| Sheet A | 1 | 2 | 3 | 4 | 5 | 6 | 7 | 8 | 9 | 10 | Final |
|---|---|---|---|---|---|---|---|---|---|---|---|
| Bice 🔨 | 1 | 0 | 0 | 0 | 2 | 0 | 0 | 1 | 0 | X | 4 |
| Howard | 0 | 0 | 3 | 0 | 0 | 0 | 2 | 0 | 3 | X | 8 |

=== 3 vs. 4 ===
February 1, 19:00

| Sheet A | 1 | 2 | 3 | 4 | 5 | 6 | 7 | 8 | 9 | 10 | Final |
|---|---|---|---|---|---|---|---|---|---|---|---|
| Walker 🔨 | 0 | 1 | 0 | 1 | 0 | 2 | 0 | 0 | 0 | 0 | 4 |
| Cochrane | 0 | 0 | 0 | 0 | 1 | 0 | 3 | 1 | 1 | 1 | 7 |

=== Semifinal ===
February 2, 09:00

| Sheet A | 1 | 2 | 3 | 4 | 5 | 6 | 7 | 8 | 9 | 10 | Final |
|---|---|---|---|---|---|---|---|---|---|---|---|
| Bice 🔨 | 2 | 2 | 0 | 0 | 2 | 0 | 1 | 0 | 2 | X | 9 |
| Cochrane | 0 | 0 | 2 | 0 | 0 | 1 | 0 | 3 | 0 | X | 6 |

=== Final ===
February 2, 13:30

| Sheet A | 1 | 2 | 3 | 4 | 5 | 6 | 7 | 8 | 9 | 10 | Final |
|---|---|---|---|---|---|---|---|---|---|---|---|
| Howard 🔨 | 0 | 1 | 1 | 0 | 0 | 1 | 1 | 1 | 0 | 0 | 5 |
| Bice | 0 | 0 | 0 | 2 | 1 | 0 | 0 | 0 | 2 | 1 | 6 |

2014 Travelers Tankard

Mark Bice
1st Ontario Provincial Championship title

== Qualification ==
Southern Ontario zones ran from December 6–15, 2013 with regional tournaments scheduled for January 4–5. Two teams from each zone qualify to 4 regional tournaments, and two teams from each of the two tournaments qualify to provincials. Two additional teams qualify out of a second chance qualifier. As defending champions, the Glenn Howard rink from the Coldwater and District Curling Club get an automatic berth in the Tankard.

| Qualification method | Berths | Qualifying team |
|---|---|---|
| Defending champions | 1 | Glenn Howard |
| Region 1 Qualifiers | 2 | Mark Homan; Bryan Cochrane |
| Region 2 Qualifiers | 2 | Rob Lobel; Shannon Beddows |
| Region 3 Qualifiers | 2 | Jake Walker; Robert Rumfeldt |
| Region 4 Qualifiers | 2 | Mark Bice; Craig Van Ymeren |
| Challenge Round Qualifiers | 2 | Jake Higgs; John Epping |

Regional Qualifiers In Bold

=== Zone Qualification ===
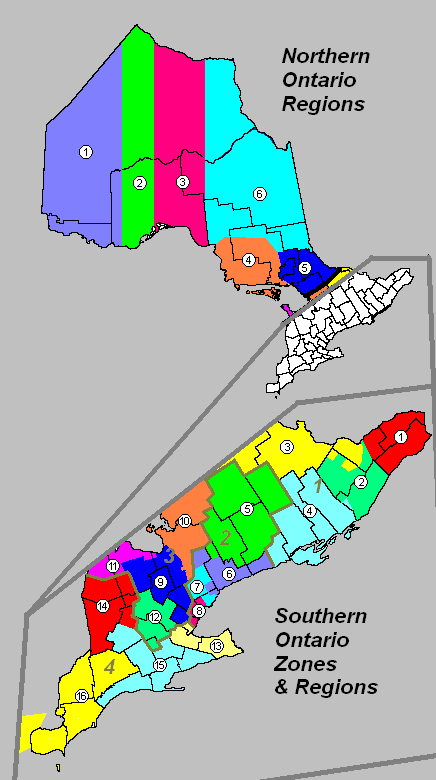
Zone Map

==== Zone 1 ====
December 6–8, at the RCMP Curling Club, Ottawa

Teams entered:

- **Ian MacAulay** (Ottawa)
- Chris Delage (Ottawa)
- Alexander Dyer (Ottawa)
- Willie Jeffries (Ottawa)
- Matt Paul (Ottawa)
- Brian Lewis (Ottawa)
- Bowie Abbis-Mills (Ottawa)
- Paul Adams (RCMP)
- **Mark Homan** (Ottawa)
- Gary Rowe (Ottawa)

==== Zone 2 ====
December 6–8, at the RCMP Curling Club, Ottawa

Teams entered:

- **Greg Richardson** (Rideau)
- **Howard Rajala** (Rideau)
- Dave Van Dine (Rideau)

==== Zone 3 ====
December 7 at the Carleton Heights Curling Club, Ottawa

Teams entered:

- **Bryan Cochrane** (City View)
- **Stephen Watson** (Renfrew)

Both teams qualify as the only teams who entered

==== Zone 4 ====
December 7 at the Trenton Curling Club, Trenton

Teams entered:

- Jeff Clark (Loonie)
- Bryce Rowe (Napanee)
- Dennis Murray (Quinte)
- **Dave Collyer** (Quinte)
- **Don Bowser** (Cataraqui)

==== Zone 5 ====
December 7 at the Lindsay Curling Club, Lindsay

Teams entered:

- **Shannon Beddows** (Cannington)
- **Douglas Brewer** (Peterborough)

Both teams qualify as the only teams who entered

==== Zone 6 ====
December 14 at the Port Perry Community Curling Club in Port Perry

Teams entered:

- Nathan Martin (Oshawa)
- **Dave Fisher** (Oshawa Golf)
- **Mark Kean** (Annandale)

==== Zone 7 ====
December 14–15, at the Richmond Hill Curling Club, Richmond Hill

Teams entered:

- Tom Worth (Bayview)
- **John Epping** (Donalda)
- Dennis Moretto (Richmond Hill)
- Dave Coutanche (Richmond Hill)
- Mike Anderson (Scarboro)
- **Rob Lobel** (Thornhill)
- Michael Shepherd (Richmond Hill)

==== Zone 8 ====
December 14–15, at the Weston Golf & Country Club, Toronto

Teams entered:

- **Roy Arndt** (High Park)
- Jonathan Duguay (Oakville)
- Guy Racette (Royals)
- Rob Retchless (Royals)
- Kevin Flewwelling (Royals)
- Darryl Prebble (Royals)
- **Josh Johnston** (Royals)
- Peter Corner (St. George's)
- Paul Madgett (Oakville)
- Aaron Clark (Weston)

==== Zone 9 ====
December 7–8, at the Milton Curling Club in Milton

Teams entered:

- Ryan Myler (Brampton)
- **Jake Walker** (Chinguacousy)
- Rayad Husain (Chinguacousy)
- Denis Cordick (North Halton)
- **Damien Villard** (Milton)

==== Zone 10 ====
December 7, at the Cookstown Curling Club, Cookstown

Teams entered:

- **Joe Frans** (Bradford)
- **Andrew Thompson** (Stroud)
- Cory Heggestad (Orilia)

==== Zone 11 ====
December 14–15, at the Curling Club of Collingwood, Collingwood

Teams entered:

- Chris Ciasnocha (Collingwood)
- **Peter Gilbert** (Collingwood)
- **Robert Rumfeldt** (Collingwood)
- Kyle Long (Wiarton)
- Scott Ballantyne (Tara)
- Kyle Steele (Collingwood)

==== Zone 12 ====
December 7–8, at the Fergus Curling Club, Fergus

Teams entered:

- **Trevor Feil** (Elora)
- Derrick Hodgson (Guelph)
- Richard Krell (Kitchener-Waterloo Granite)
- Andrew Flemming (Westmount)
- **Peter Mellor** (Kitchener-Waterloo Granite)

==== Zone 13 ====
December 7–8, at the Glendale Golf & Country Club, Hamilton

Teams entered:

- Brent Palmer (Burlington)
- Rick Thurston (Dundas Granite)
- Terry Corbin (Dundas Valley)
- Simon Ouelet (Glendale)
- **Mark Bice** (Glendale)
- **Scott Banner** (Glendale)
- Kris Blonski (Dundas Valley)

==== Zone 14 ====
December 7–8, at the Palmerston Curling Club, Palmerston

Teams entered:

- Chris DeCloet (Harriston)
- **Craig Kochan** (Harriston)
- **Mike Aprile** (Listowel)
- A. J. Schumacher (Walkerton)
- Pat Ferris (Listowel)
- Daryl Shane (Wingham)

==== Zone 15 ====
December 7–8, St. Thomas Curling Club, St. Thomas

Teams entered:

- Wayne Tuck, Jr. (Brant)
- **Aaron Squires** (St. Thomas)
- Peter Van Ymeren (St. Thomas)
- **Craig Van Ymeren** (St. Thomas)
- Rob Morin (St. Thomas)
- Jason Malcho (Stratford)

==== Zone 16 ====
December 14–15, Ilderton Curling Club, Ilderton

Teams entered:

- John Young, Jr. (Chatham Granite)
- Dale Kelly (Chatham Granite)
- Bill Mitchell (Glencoe)
- Jake Higgs (Glencoe)
- Joel Moore (Highland)
- **Scott McDonald** (Ilderton)
- Chris Liscumb (Ilderton)
- **Nick Rizzo** (Ilderton)

=== Regional qualification ===
==== Region 1 ====
January 4–5, Quinte Curling Club, Belleville

A Side
1A | **Ian MacAulay** | **8**
4B | Dave Collyer | 7
2A | **Howard Rajala** | **5**
3B | Bryan Cochrane | 4
4A | Don Bowser | 6
1B | **Mark Homan** | **7**
3A | Stephen Watson | 5
2B | **Greg Richardson** | **8**

Semifinal
1A | Ian MacAulay | 5
2A | **Howard Rajala** | **6**
1B | **Mark Homan** | **7**
2B | Greg Richardson | 4

Final
2A | Howard Rajala | 9
1B | **Mark Homan** | **10**

B Side
4B | Dave Collyer | 4
3B | **Bryan Cochrane** | **6**
4A | **Don Bowser** | **7**
3A | Stephen Watson | 6

Quarterfinal
2B | Greg Richardson | 5
3B | **Bryan Cochrane** | **6**
1A | Ian MacAulay | 2
4A | **Don Bowser** | **7**

Semifinal
3B | **Bryan Cochrane** | **8**
4A | Don Bowser | 2
**Final**
3B | **Bryan Cochrane** | **6**
2A | Howard Rajala | 4

==== Region 2 ====
January 4–5, Lakefield Curling Club, Lakefield

A Side
5A | Douglas Brewer | 3
8B | **Josh Johnston** | **8**
6A | Mark Kean | 6
7B | **Rob Lobel** | **7**
8A | Roy Arndt | 5
5B | **Shannon Beddows** | **8**
7A | John Epping | 1
6B | **Dave Fisher** | **3**

Semifinal
8B | Josh Johnston | 4
7B | **Rob Lobel** | **8**
5B | Shannon Beddows | 5
6B | **Dave Fisher** | **8**

Final
7B | **Rob Lobel** | **5**
6B | Dave Fisher | 4

B Side
5A | **Douglas Brewer** | **6**
6A | Mark Kean | 2
8A | **Roy Arndt** | **8**
7A | John Epping | 5

Quarterfinal
5B | **Shannon Beddows** | **9**
5A | Mark Kean | 4
8B | Josh Johnston | 3
8A | **Roy Arndt** | **8**

Semifinal
5B | **Shannon Beddows** | **7**
8A | Roy Arndt | 5
**Final**
5B | **Shannon Beddows** | **10**
6B | Dave Fisher | 3

==== Region 3 ====
January 4–5, Alliston Curling Club, Alliston

A Side
9A | **Jake Walker** | **6**
12B | Trevor Feil | 2
10A | **Joe Frans** | **8**
11B | Peter Gilbert | 1
12A | **Peter Mellor** | **5**
9B | Damien Villard | 3
11A | **Robert Rumfeldt** | **7**
10B | Andrew Thompson | 1

Semifinal
9A | **Jake Walker** | **9**
10A | Joe Frans | 2
12A | **Peter Mellor** | **9**
11A | Robert Rumfeldt | 5

Final
9A | **Jake Walker** | **5**
12A | Peter Mellor | 1

B Side
12B | **Trevor Feil** | **8**
11B | Peter Gilbert | 7
9B | **Damien Villard** | **8**
10B | Andrew Thompson | 2

Quarterfinal
11A | **Robert Rumfeldt** | **9**
12B | Trevor Feil | 2
10A | **Joe Frans** | **8**
9B | Damien Villard | 4

Semifinal
11A | **Robert Rumfeldt** | **6**
10A | Joe Frans | 4
**Final**
11A | **Robert Rumfeldt** | **7**
12A | Peter Mellor | 6

==== Region 4 ====
January 4–5, Dundas Granite Curling Club, Dundas

A Side
13A | **Mark Bice** | **7**
16B | Scott McDonald | 2
14A | Craig Kochan | 2
15B | **Aaron Squires** | **7**
16A | **Nick Rizzo** | **9**
13B | Scott Banner | 7
15A | **Craig Van Ymeren** | **9**
14B | Mike Aprile | 2

Semifinal
13A | **Mark Bice** | **10**
15B | Aaron Squires | 7
16A | Nick Rizzo | 2
15A | **Craig Van Ymeren** | **8**

Final
13A | **Mark Bice** | **5**
15A | Craig Van Ymeren | 3

B Side
16B | **Scott McDonald** | **5**
14A | Craig Kochan | 2
13B | Scott Banner | 3
14B | **Mike Aprile** | **8**

Quarterfinal
16A | **Nick Rizzo** | **11**
16B | Scott McDonald | 6
15B | Aaron Squires | 4
14B | **Mike Aprile** | **6**

Semifinal
16A | **Nick Rizzo** | **9**
14B | Mike Aprile | 5
**Final**
16A | Nick Rizzo | 3
15A | **Craig Van Ymeren** | **6**

=== Challenge Round ===
January 10–13, at the Brampton Curling Club in Brampton

A Side
16 | Richard Krell | 5
17 | **Ryan Myler** | **8**
14 | **Peter Corner** | **8**
19 | Axel Larsen | 2
15 | **Rob Retchless** | **10**
18 | Chris Gardner | 6

Round of 16
17 | Ryan Myler | 3
1 | **John Epping** | **8**
9 | Pat Ferris | 5
8 | **Don Bowser** | **6**
12 | Roy Arndt | 7
5 | **Jake Higgs** | **11**
13 | **Mike Anderson** | **7**
4 | Darryl Prebble | 6
14 | Peter Corner | 6
3 | **Wayne Tuck, Jr.** | **7**
11 | Scott McDonald | 5
6 | **Ian MacAulay** | **8**
10 | Nick Rizzo | 4
7 | **Mark Kean** | **7**
15 | **Rob Retchless** | **10**
2 | Joe Frans | 9

Quarterfinals
1 | **John Epping** | **7**
8 | Don Bowser | 6
5 | **Jake Higgs** | **9**
13 | Mike Anderson | 6
3 | Wayne Tuck, Jr. | 8
6 | **Ian MacAulay** | **10**
7 | Mark Kean | 5
15 | **Rob Retchless** | **6**

Semifinals
1 | John Epping | 3
5 | **Jake Higgs** | **5**
6 | **Ian MacAulay** | **6**
15 | Rob Retchless | 3

A Final
5 | **Jake Higgs** | **7**
6 | Ian MacAulay | 1

B Side (top half)
16 | **Richard Krell** | **10**
12 | Roy Arndt | 4

Quarterfinals
17 | Ryan Myler | 7
9 | **Pat Ferris** | **8**
16 | **Richard Krell** | **7**
4 | Darryl Prebble | 6

Semifinals
7 | **Mark Kean** | **8**
9 | Pat Ferris | 7
3 | **Wayne Tuck, Jr.** | **9**
16 | Richard Krell | 6

To B Quarterfinal
7 | **Mark Kean** | **9**
3 | Wayne Tuck, Jr. | 6

B Side (bottom half)
Chris Gardner | 4
**Scott McDonald** | **8**
19 | Axel Larsen | 4
10 | **Nick Rizzo** | **9**

Quarterfinals
11 | **Scott McDonald** | **8**
14 | Peter Corner | 4
2 | **Joe Frans** | **10**
10 | Nick Rizzo | 9

Semifinals
13 | **Mike Anderson** | **7**
11 | Scott McDonald | 4
8 | Don Bowser | 4
2 | **Joe Frans** | **10**

To B Quarterfinal
13 | Mike Anderson | 5
2 | **Joe Frans** | **9**

| B Quarterfinal | | | B Semifinal | | | **B Final** |
| | | | | | | 6 | Ian MacAulay | 3 |
| 7 | Mark Kean | 2 | | | | 1 | **John Epping** | **6** |
| 1 | **John Epping** | **7** | 1 | **John Epping** | **6** |
| 2 | **Joe Frans** | **10** | 2 | Joe Frans | 4 |
| 15 | Rob Retchless | 5 |
