= 2012 The Dominion Tankard =

Curling championship in Canada

The Dominion Tankard 2012
- Host city: Stratford, Ontario
- Arena: Stratford Rotary Complex
- Dates: February 6-12
- Winner: Glenn Howard
- Curling club: Coldwater & District Curling Club, Coldwater
- Skip: Glenn Howard
- Third: Wayne Middaugh
- Second: Brent Laing
- Lead: Craig Savill
- Finalist: Peter Corner

The 2012 Dominion Tankard, Southern Ontario men's provincial curling championship, was held from February 6 to 12, hosted by the Stratford Country Club at the Stratford Rotary Complex in Stratford, Ontario. The winning team of Glenn Howard, represented Ontario at the 2012 Tim Hortons Brier in Saskatoon, Saskatchewan.

== Teams ==
Skip	Third	Second	Lead	Club(s)
Mike Anderson	Chris Van Huyse	Matt Mapletoft	Sean Harrison	Thornhill Golf & Country Club, Thornhill
Greg Balsdon	Chris Ciasnocha	Tyler Morgan	Jason Boyce	Loonie Curling Club, Rideau Lakes
Bryan Cochrane	Rich Moffatt	Chris Fulton	John Steski	Rideau Curling Club, Ottawa
Peter Corner	Graeme McCarrel	Joe Frans	Darryl Prebble	Brampton Curling Club, Brampton
Dayna Deruelle	Andrew McGaugh	Kevin Lagerquist	Evan DeViller	Brampton Curling Club, Brampton
Chris Gardner	Mat Camm	Brad Kidd	Doug Johnston	Arnprior Curling Club, Arnprior
Brent Ross (fourth)	Jake Higgs (skip)	Jonathan Beuk	Bill Buchanan	Harriston Curling Club, Harriston
Glenn Howard	Wayne Middaugh	Brent Laing	Craig Savill	Coldwater and District Curling Club, Coldwater
Mark Kean	Andrew Clayton	Patrick Janssen	Tim March	Annandale Curling Club, Ajax
Daryl Shane	Bruce Cox	Dylan Tippin	Brandon Tippin	Listowel Curling Club, Listowel
Wayne Tuck, Jr.	Craig Kochan	Scott McDonald	Paul Moffatt	Woodstock Curling Club, Woodstock

== Standings ==
Skip (Club)	W	L	PF	PA	Ends Won	Ends Lost	Blank Ends	Stolen Ends
Glenn Howard (Coldwater)	10	0	81	30	39	22	7	13
Peter Corner (Brampton)	8	2	70	55	39	35	14	7
Mike Anderson (Thornhill)	6	4	70	63	41	39	8	8
Dayna Deruelle (Brampton)	5	5	65	80	44	46	2	9
Wayne Tuck, Jr. (Woodstock)	5	5	61	68	38	37	12	10
Bryan Cochrane (Rideau)	5	5	66	50	44	38	6	15
Chris Gardner (Arnprior)	4	6	63	67	37	42	11	8
Jake Higgs (Harriston)	3	7	67	75	41	47	7	6
Greg Balsdon (Loonie)	3	7	73	74	40	43	8	9
Mark Kean (Annandale)	3	7	58	78	38	43	6	12
Daryl Shane (Listowel)	3	7	53	72	36	43	8	9

== Results ==
=== Draw 1 ===
February 6, 2:00 PM ET

Sheet A	1	2	3	4	5	6	7	8	9	10	Final
Deruelle	0	4	0	0	1	0	1	0	X	X	6
Howard 🔨	3	0	4	0	0	2	0	3	X	X	12

Sheet B	1	2	3	4	5	6	7	8	9	10	Final
Balsdon 🔨	0	1	2	1	0	2	0	1	X	X	7
Shane	0	0	0	0	1	0	1	0	X	X	2

Sheet C	1	2	3	4	5	6	7	8	9	10	Final
Kean	0	0	2	0	1	0	0	X	X	X	3
Corner 🔨	2	2	0	2	0	1	2	X	X	X	9

Sheet D	1	2	3	4	5	6	7	8	9	10	Final
Gardner	0	0	0	0	1	0	0	3	0	0	4
Tuck 🔨	0	2	1	0	0	0	1	0	0	2	6

Sheet E	1	2	3	4	5	6	7	8	9	10	11	Final
Higgs 🔨	1	0	1	0	1	0	1	0	2	0	0	6
Cochrane	0	1	0	1	0	2	0	1	0	1	2	8

=== Draw 2 ===
February 6, 7:30 PM ET

Sheet A	1	2	3	4	5	6	7	8	9	10	Final
Corner	0	0	0	1	0	0	4	0	4	X	9
Tuck 🔨	0	0	2	0	1	0	0	1	0	X	4

Sheet B	1	2	3	4	5	6	7	8	9	10	11	Final
Higgs 🔨	2	0	3	0	1	0	0	0	0	1	3	10
Balsdon	0	1	0	2	0	1	1	1	1	0	0	7

Sheet C	1	2	3	4	5	6	7	8	9	10	Final
Howard 🔨	2	0	2	0	0	1	1	0	3	X	9
Cochrane	0	2	0	1	2	0	0	1	0	X	6

Sheet D	1	2	3	4	5	6	7	8	9	10	Final
Deruelle	0	0	1	0	1	0	X	X	X	X	2
Anderson 🔨	2	2	0	2	0	3	X	X	X	X	9

Sheet E	1	2	3	4	5	6	7	8	9	10	Final
Kean 🔨	0	0	3	0	0	1	0	3	2	1	10
Shane	2	1	0	2	1	0	2	0	0	0	8

=== Draw 3 ===
February 7, 2:00 PM ET

Sheet A	1	2	3	4	5	6	7	8	9	10	Final
Cochrane 🔨	1	1	0	1	0	0	1	0	1	0	5
Anderson	0	0	2	0	2	0	0	1	0	1	6

Sheet B	1	2	3	4	5	6	7	8	9	10	Final
Kean	0	1	1	1	0	2	0	0	2	0	7
Higgs 🔨	2	0	0	0	3	0	0	3	0	1	9

Sheet C	1	2	3	4	5	6	7	8	9	10	Final
Tuck	0	0	1	0	1	0	1	0	X	X	3
Shane 🔨	2	1	0	2	0	1	0	2	X	X	8

Sheet D	1	2	3	4	5	6	7	8	9	10	11	Final
Corner 🔨	0	0	2	0	1	0	0	4	0	0	1	8
Gardner	0	1	0	2	0	1	0	0	2	1	0	7

Sheet E	1	2	3	4	5	6	7	8	9	10	Final
Howard 🔨	1	1	0	0	4	0	2	X	X	X	8
Balsdon	0	0	1	0	0	2	0	X	X	X	3

=== Draw 4 ===
February 7, 7:00 PM ET

Sheet A	1	2	3	4	5	6	7	8	9	10	Final
Shane	1	0	0	3	0	1	0	1	0	0	6
Gardner 🔨	0	3	0	0	2	0	1	0	2	1	9

Sheet B	1	2	3	4	5	6	7	8	9	10	Final
Howard	1	0	1	1	0	1	1	0	0	1	6
Kean	0	1	0	0	1	0	0	0	2	0	4

Sheet C	1	2	3	4	5	6	7	8	9	10	Final
Anderson 🔨	0	0	4	0	0	2	0	0	1	X	7
Balsdon	1	1	0	5	0	0	2	0	0	X	9

Sheet D	1	2	3	4	5	6	7	8	9	10	11	Final
Cochrane 🔨	0	1	1	0	0	1	0	2	0	2	0	7
Deruelle	1	0	0	3	1	0	1	0	1	0	1	8

Sheet E	1	2	3	4	5	6	7	8	9	10	Final
Tuck 🔨	0	2	1	0	1	0	3	3	X	X	10
Higgs	0	0	0	1	0	2	0	0	X	X	3

=== Draw 5 ===
February 8, 9:00 AM ET

Sheet A	1	2	3	4	5	6	7	8	9	10	Final
Balsdon 🔨	1	1	0	2	0	2	0	0	3	X	9
Deruelle	0	0	0	0	1	0	2	1	0	X	4

Sheet B	1	2	3	4	5	6	7	8	9	10	Final
Tuck 🔨	0	0	1	0	X	X	X	X	X	X	1
Howard	3	0	0	4	X	X	X	X	X	X	7

Sheet C	1	2	3	4	5	6	7	8	9	10	Final
Gardner 🔨	3	0	0	0	2	0	3	0	1	X	9
Higgs	0	1	1	1	0	2	0	1	0	X	6

Sheet D	1	2	3	4	5	6	7	8	9	10	Final
Shane 🔨	0	0	0	1	0	3	1	0	0	1	6
Corner	0	0	0	0	2	0	0	1	1	0	4

Sheet E	1	2	3	4	5	6	7	8	9	10	Final
Anderson	0	1	0	0	2	0	1	0	0	X	4
Kean 🔨	1	0	3	0	0	1	0	1	1	X	7

=== Draw 6 ===
February 8, 2:00 PM ET

Sheet A	1	2	3	4	5	6	7	8	9	10	Final
Higgs 🔨	1	0	0	2	0	0	0	0	1	0	5
Corner	0	0	2	0	2	0	0	1	0	1	6

Sheet B	1	2	3	4	5	6	7	8	9	10	Final
Anderson 🔨	2	0	2	0	1	0	0	2	1	X	8
Tuck	0	2	0	1	0	2	1	0	0	X	6

Sheet C	1	2	3	4	5	6	7	8	9	10	Final
Deruelle	2	0	1	1	0	0	2	0	0	2	8
Kean 🔨	0	2	0	0	1	1	0	1	1	0	6

Sheet D	1	2	3	4	5	6	7	8	9	10	Final
Balsdon 🔨	0	1	1	0	0	1	0	2	0	0	5
Cochrane	1	0	0	1	2	0	1	0	1	1	7

Sheet E	1	2	3	4	5	6	7	8	9	10	Final
Gardner	0	0	0	0	X	X	X	X	X	X	0
Howard 🔨	3	0	1	1	X	X	X	X	X	X	5

=== Draw 7 ===
February 8, 7:00 PM ET

Sheet A	1	2	3	4	5	6	7	8	9	10	Final
Kean	0	1	0	0	X	X	X	X	X	X	1
Cochrane 🔨	3	0	3	3	X	X	X	X	X	X	9

Sheet B	1	2	3	4	5	6	7	8	9	10	Final
Gardner 🔨	0	0	1	1	0	1	1	0	2	0	6
Anderson	2	2	0	0	2	0	0	1	0	2	9

Sheet C	1	2	3	4	5	6	7	8	9	10	Final
Corner	0	0	0	1	0	0	X	X	X	X	1
Howard 🔨	2	1	1	0	4	3	X	X	X	X	11

Sheet D	1	2	3	4	5	6	7	8	9	10	Final
Higgs 🔨	2	1	1	0	2	0	2	0	3	X	11
Shane	0	0	0	2	0	1	0	1	0	X	4

Sheet E	1	2	3	4	5	6	7	8	9	10	Final
Deruelle 🔨	1	1	0	1	0	4	1	0	2	X	10
Tuck	0	0	1	0	2	0	0	2	0	X	3

=== Draw 8 ===
February 9, 2:00 PM ET

Sheet A	1	2	3	4	5	6	7	8	9	10	Final
Howard 🔨	2	0	3	0	3	X	X	X	X	X	8
Shane	0	1	0	1	0	X	X	X	X	X	2

Sheet B	1	2	3	4	5	6	7	8	9	10	11	Final
Deruelle 🔨	0	1	1	0	2	2	0	0	3	0	1	10
Gardner	1	0	0	1	0	0	2	3	0	2	0	9

Sheet C	1	2	3	4	5	6	7	8	9	10	Final
Cochrane 🔨	0	0	0	1	0	4	0	0	0	1	6
Tuck	1	1	1	0	2	0	0	1	1	0	7

Sheet D	1	2	3	4	5	6	7	8	9	10	Final
Kean 🔨	1	0	1	1	4	0	0	4	X	X	11
Balsdon	0	1	0	0	0	0	4	0	0	0	5

Sheet E	1	2	3	4	5	6	7	8	9	10	Final
Corner 🔨	1	0	3	0	0	0	3	0	2	X	9
Anderson	0	2	0	1	1	1	0	2	0	X	7

=== Draw 9 ===
February 9, 7:00 PM ET

Sheet A	1	2	3	4	5	6	7	8	9	10	Final
Tuck	0	3	0	2	0	2	1	0	0	X	8
Balsdon 🔨	1	0	1	0	3	0	0	0	2	X	7

Sheet B	1	2	3	4	5	6	7	8	9	10	Final
Corner 🔨	1	0	2	0	1	0	3	0	1	X	8
Deruelle	0	2	0	2	0	1	0	1	0	X	5

Sheet C	1	2	3	4	5	6	7	8	9	10	Final
Shane	0	2	0	2	0	0	2	0	0	X	6
Anderson 🔨	2	0	1	0	3	1	0	2	0	X	9

Sheet D	1	2	3	4	5	6	7	8	9	10	Final
Howard 🔨	2	1	0	2	1	0	2	0	X	X	8
Higgs	0	0	2	0	0	1	0	1	X	X	4

Sheet E	1	2	3	4	5	6	7	8	9	10	Final
Cochrane 🔨	2	1	0	0	1	2	2	X	X	X	8
Gardner	0	0	0	1	0	0	0	X	X	X	1

=== Draw 10 ===
February 10, 2:00 PM ET

Sheet A	1	2	3	4	5	6	7	8	9	10	Final
Anderson	0	0	0	2	0	1	3	0	0	2	8
Higgs 🔨	0	2	0	0	2	0	0	1	2	0	7

Sheet B	1	2	3	4	5	6	7	8	9	10	Final
Cochrane	0	0	0	0	1	1	0	0	X	X	2
Corner 🔨	1	0	2	0	0	0	2	1	X	X	6

Sheet C	1	2	3	4	5	6	7	8	9	10	Final
Balsdon	0	0	1	0	1	0	2	0	2	0	6
Gardner 🔨	1	0	0	2	0	1	0	1	0	2	7

Sheet D	1	2	3	4	5	6	7	8	9	10	Final
Tuck 🔨	2	0	2	0	0	0	1	2	0	4	11
Kean	0	1	0	1	1	1	0	0	2	0	6

Sheet E	1	2	3	4	5	6	7	8	9	10	Final
Shane	0	1	1	0	2	0	2	1	2	X	9
Deruelle	2	0	0	1	0	1	0	0	0	X	4

=== Draw 11 ===
February 10, 7:00 PM ET

Sheet A	1	2	3	4	5	6	7	8	9	10	Final
Gardner 🔨	2	2	0	0	3	0	2	2	X	X	11
Kean	0	0	1	2	0	0	0	0	X	X	3

Sheet B	1	2	3	4	5	6	7	8	9	10	Final
Shane 🔨	0	0	1	0	0	1	0	0	X	X	2
Cochrane	1	0	0	2	1	0	2	1	X	X	7

Sheet C	1	2	3	4	5	6	7	8	9	10	Final
Higgs	0	1	0	1	0	2	0	0	2	X	6
Deruelle	1	0	1	0	1	0	4	1	0	X	8

Sheet D	1	2	3	4	5	6	7	8	9	10	Final
Anderson 🔨	1	0	0	1	0	0	1	0	X	X	3
Howard	0	0	2	0	3	0	0	2	X	X	7

Sheet E	1	2	3	4	5	6	7	8	9	10	Final
Balsdon	0	2	0	2	0	1	0	0	X	X	5
Corner 🔨	2	0	3	0	1	0	1	3	X	X	10

=== Tiebreaker 1 ===
February 11, 9:00 AM ET

Sheet A	1	2	3	4	5	6	7	8	9	10	Final
Tuck 🔨	0	1	0	2	1	0	3	0	2	X	9
Cochrane	0	0	1	0	0	1	0	2	0	X	4

=== Tiebreaker 2 ===
February 11, 2:00 PM ET

Sheet A	1	2	3	4	5	6	7	8	9	10	Final
Deruelle 🔨	1	0	0	0	1	0	0	3	0	1	6
Tuck	0	0	1	1	0	0	1	0	2	0	5

== Playoffs ==
Page playoff system
1	Glenn Howard	7
2	Peter Corner	6
3	Mike Anderson	7
4	Dayna Deruelle	3

Semifinal
2	Peter Corner	8
3	Mike Anderson	5

Final
1	Glenn Howard	5
2	Peter Corner	4

=== 1 vs. 2 ===
February 11, 7:00 PM ET

Sheet A	1	2	3	4	5	6	7	8	9	10	11	Final
Howard 🔨	1	0	0	0	2	0	1	0	1	1	1	7
Corner	0	1	1	1	0	2	0	1	0	0	0	6

=== 3 vs. 4 ===
February 11, 7:00 PM ET

Sheet A	1	2	3	4	5	6	7	8	9	10	Final
Anderson 🔨	1	1	2	0	2	0	1	0	X	X	7
Deruelle	0	0	0	0	0	1	0	2	X	X	3

=== Semifinal ===
February 12, 9:30 AM ET

Sheet A	1	2	3	4	5	6	7	8	9	10	Final
Corner 🔨	0	3	2	0	0	3	0	0	0	X	8
Anderson	2	0	0	0	2	0	0	1	0	X	5

=== Final ===
February 12, 2:00 PM ET

Sheet A	1	2	3	4	5	6	7	8	9	10	Final
Howard 🔨	2	0	0	0	2	0	0	0	0	1	5
Corner	0	0	0	2	0	1	1	0	0	0	4

2012 Dominion Tankard

Glenn Howard
Ontario Provincial Championship title

== Qualification ==
Southern Ontario zones run from December 9-11, 2011, and December 16-19, 2011. Two teams from each zone qualify to four regional tournaments, and two teams from each of the four tournaments qualify to provincials. Two additional teams qualify out of the challenge round.

The Northern Ontario provincial championship will occur December 8-11 at the Copper Cliff Curling Club in Copper Cliff, Ontario. Four teams qualify out of the Northern Ontario championship.

Regional Qualifiers In Bold

=== Southern Ontario Zone Qualification ===
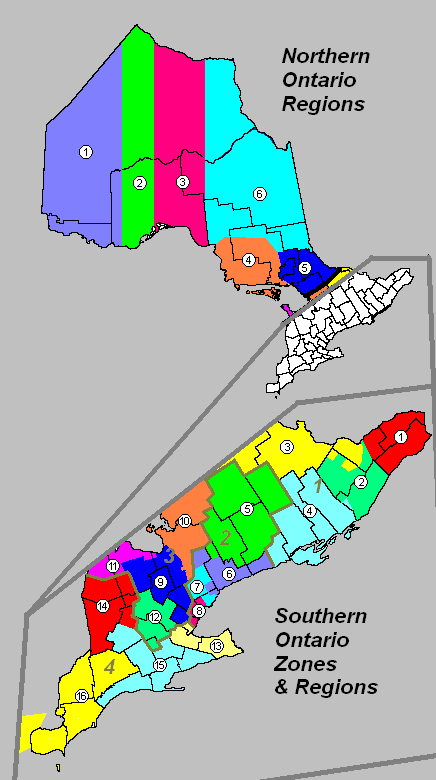
Zone Map

==== Zone 1 ====
December 9-11 at the RCMP Curling Club, Ottawa

- **Shane Latimer (Ottawa Curling)**
- **Willie Jeffries (Ottawa Curling)**
- Ron Hrycak (Ottawa Curling)
- Mark Homan (Ottawa Curling)
- Gary Rowe (Ottawa Curling)
- Team Dow (RCMP)
- Ian MacAulay (Ottawa Curling)

==== Zone 2 ====
December 9-11 at the RCMP Curling Club, Ottawa

- **Jim Hunker (Rideau)**
- **Bryan Cochrane (Rideau)**
- Steve Lodge (Brockville)
- Gregory Richardson (Rideau)
- Howard Rajala (Rideau)
- Daryl Smith (Rideau)
- Bill Blad (Rideau)

==== Zone 3 ====
December 9-11 at the Pakenham Curling Club, Pakenham

- **Josh Adams (Granite of W. Ottawa)**
- **Chris Gardner (Arnprior)**
- Calvin Christiansen (Arnprior)
- Dennis Elgie (City View)
- Dwayne Lowe (Huntley)
- Matt Paul (Renfrew)
- Damien Villard (Renfrew)

==== Zone 4 ====
December 17-18 at the Brighton & District Curling Club, Brighton

- **Greg Balsdon (Loonie)**
- **Dennis Murray (Quinte)**
- Bryce Rowe (Land O'Lakes)
- Jeff Clark (Loonie)
- Rob Dickson (Napanee)
- Gary Rusconi (Trenton)

==== Zone 5 ====
December 17-18 at the Beaverton Curling Club, Beaverton

- **Jon St.Denis (Peterborough C.C.)**
- **Wayne Warren (Haliburton)**
- Jake Speedie (Beaverton)
- Wayne Shea (Bobcaygeon)
- Shannon Beddows (Cannington)
- Nick Avlonitis (Lakefield)
- Jim O'Marra (Peterborough C.C.)
- Mike Mclean (Peterborough C.C.)

==== Zone 6 ====
December 10-11 at the Sutton Curling Club, Sutton West

- **Sean Aune (Annandale)**
- **Mark Kean (Annandale)**
- Nathan Martin (Oshawa Curling)
- Ryan Winch (Sutton)
- Gary Grant (Uxbridge)
- Rob Lobel (Whitby)
- Jason March (Annandale)
- John Bell (Unionville)
- Tim Morrison (Unionville)

==== Zone 7 ====
December 10-11 at the East York Country Club, Toronto

- **Mike Anderson (Thornhill)**
- **Michael Shepherd (East York)**
- John Epping (Donalda)
- Dennis Moretto (Richmond Hill)
- Bob Turcotte (Scarboro)
- Geoff Truscott (Scarboro)
- Mark Inglis (Thornhill)
- Morio Kumagawa (York)

==== Zone 8 ====
December 10-11 at the St. George's Golf & Country Club, Toronto

- **Denis Belanger (Royals)**
- **Mike Harris (Oakville)**
- Tom Worth (Dixie)
- Jonathan Braden (High Park)
- Pat Ferris (Oakville)
- Dave Pallen (Royals)
- Guy Racette (Royals)
- Bill Duck (St. George's)
- Ian Fleming (Royals)
- Josh Johnston (Royals)

==== Zone 9 ====
December 10-11 at the King Curling Club, Schomberg

- **Peter Corner (Brampton)**
- **Dayna Deruelle (Brampton)**
- Rayad Husain (Chinguacousy)
- George Gerrits (King)
- Steve Broad (King)
- Jeff Brown (Shelburne)
- Alex Foster (North Halton)

==== Zone 10 ====
December 10-11 at the Barrie Curling Club, Barrie

- **Cory Heggestad (Orillia)**
- **G.W. King (Midland)**
- Travis Dafoe (Bradford)
- Andrew Thompson (Stroud)
- Dale Matchett (Bradford)
- Steve Holmes (Parry Sound)

==== Zone 11 ====
December 18 at the Blue Water Curling Club, Owen Sound

- **Joey Rettinger (Tara)**
- **Al Hutchinson (Blue Water)**
- Murray Dougherty (Meaford)
- Tom Slumskie (Tara)

==== Zone 12 ====
December 10-11 at the Elmira & District Curling Club, Elmira

- **Robert Rumfeldt (Guelph Curling)**
- **Axel Larsen (Guelph Curling)**
- Dave Kaun (K-W Granite)
- Peter Mellor (K-W Granite)
- Ed Cyr (Westmount)

==== Zone 13 ====
December 10-11 at the St. Catharines Curling Club, St. Catharines

- **Daniel Frans (St. Catharines Golf)**
- **Todd Brandwood (Glendale)**
- Wayne Gowan (Dundas Granite)
- Rick Thurston (Dundas Granite)
- Steve Goodger (Dundas Granite)
- Simon Ouellet (Glendale)
- Dan LeBlanc (Glendale)
- Garth Mitchell (Grimsby)

==== Zone 14 ====
December 10 at the Mount Forest Curling Club, Mount Forest

- **Jake Higgs (Harriston)**
- **Daryl Shane (Listowel)**
- Mike Aprile (Listowel)

==== Zone 15 ====
December 17-18 at the Woodstock Curling Club, Woodstock

- **Bowie Abbis-Mills (Aylmer)**
- **Travis Fanset (Brant)**
- Bob Armstrong (Ingersoll)
- Terry Corbin (Norwich)
- Nick Rizzo (Paris)
- Jim Lyle (St. Thomas)
- Wayne Tuck Jr. (Woodstock)

==== Zone 16 ====
December 10-11 at the Chatham Granite Club, Chatham

- **Mark Bice (Sarnia)**
- **Phil Daniel (Chatham Granite)**
- Perry Smyth (Chatham Granite)
- John Young (Chatham Granite)
- Tim Lindsay (London)
- Tom Pruliere (Sarnia)

== Regions ==
January 7-8, 2012

=== Region 1 (Zones 1-4) ===
Rideau Curling Club, Ottawa

A Side
1A	Shane Latimer
2B	Bryan Cochrane
3A	Josh Adams
4B	Dennis Murray
2A	Jim Hunker
1B	Willie Jeffries
4A	Greg Balsdon
3B	Chris Gardner

Semifinal
1A	Shane Latimer
4B	Dennis Murray
1B	Willie Jeffries
4A	Greg Balsdon

Final
1A	Shane Latimer
4A	Greg Balsdon

B Side
2B	Bryan Cochrane
3A	Josh Adams
2A	Jim Hunker
3B	Chris Gardner

Quarterfinal
2B	Bryan Cochrane
1B	Willie Jeffries
2A	Jim Hunker
4B	Dennis Murray

Semifinal
2B	Bryan Cochrane
2A	Jim Hunker
Final
2B	Bryan Cochrane
1A	Shane Latimer

=== Region 2 (Zones 5-8) ===
Granite Club, Toronto

A Side
5A	Jon St.Denis
6B	Mark Kean
7A	Mike Anderson
8B	Mike Harris
6A	Sean Aune
5B	Wayne Warren
8A	Denis Belanger
7B	Michael Shepherd

Semifinal
6B	Mark Kean
7A	Mike Anderson
6A	Sean Aune
8A	Denis Belanger

Final
6B	Mark Kean
6A	Sean Aune

B Side
5A	Jon St.Denis
8B	Mike Harris
5B	Wayne Warren
7B	Michael Shepherd

Quarterfinal
8B	Mike Harris
8A	Denis Belanger
7B	Michael Shepherd
7A	Mike Anderson

Semifinal
8B	Mike Harris
7A	Mike Anderson
Final
7A	Mike Anderson
6A	Sean Aune

=== Region 3 (Zones 9-12) ===
Meaford Curling Club, Meaford

A Side
9A	Peter Corner
10B	G.W. King
11A	Joey Rettinger
12B	Axel Larsen
10A	Cory Heggestad
9B	Dayna Deruelle
12A	Robert Rumfeldt
11B	Al Hutchinson

Semifinal
9A	Peter Corner
12B	Axel Larsen
10A	Cory Heggestad
11B	Al Hutchinson

Final
9A	Peter Corner
11B	Al Hutchinson

B Side
10B	G.W. King
11A	Joey Rettinger
9B	Dayna Deruelle
12A	Robert Rumfeldt

Quarterfinal
11A	Joey Rettinger
10A	Cory Heggestad
9B	Dayna Deruelle
12B	Axel Larsen

Semifinal
10A	Cory Heggestad
9B	Dayna Deruelle
Final
9B	Dayna Deruelle
11B	Al Hutchinson

=== Region 4 (Zones 13-16) ===
Brantford Golf & Country Club, Brantford

A Side
13A	Daniel Frans
14B	Daryl Shane
15A	Bowie Abbis-Mills
16B	Phil Daniel
14A	Jake Higgs
13B	Todd Brandwood
16A	Mark Bice
15B	Travis Fanset

Semifinal
14B	Daryl Shane
16B	Phil Daniel
14A	Jake Higgs
15B	Travis Fanset

Final
14B	Daryl Shane
14A	Jake Higgs

B Side
13A	Daniel Frans
15A	Bowie Abbis-Mills
13B	Todd Brandwood
16A	Mark Bice

Quarterfinal
15A	Bowie Abbis-Mills
15B	Travis Fanset
16A	Mark Bice
16B	Phil Daniel

Semifinal
15A	Bowie Abbis-Mills
16A	Mark Bice
Final
15A	Bowie Abbis-Mills
14A	Jake Higgs
