= 2010 Ontario Men's Curling Championship =

Curling championship in Canada

- Host city: Napanee, Ontario
- Arena: Strathcona Paper Centre
- Dates: February 1-7
- Winner: Team Howard
- Curling club: Coldwater & District CC, Coldwater
- Skip: Glenn Howard
- Third: Richard Hart
- Second: Brent Laing
- Lead: Craig Savill
- Finalist: Bryan Cochrane

The 2010 Ontario Men's Curling Championship was held February 1-7th, 2010 at the Strathcona Paper Centre in Napanee.

Eleven teams participated. It marked the first year that the defending champion (Glenn Howard's rink) would get an automatic berth.

Winner Glenn Howard went on to represent Ontario at the 2010 Tim Hortons Brier in Halifax, Nova Scotia, losing in the final to Kevin Koe's Alberta rink.

== Teams ==
| Skip | Third | Second | Lead | Curling Club |
|---|---|---|---|---|
| Mark Bice | Codey Maus | Steve Bice | John Grant | Tara Curling Club, Tara |
| Chris Ciasnocha | Wes Johnson | Jamie Farnell | Andrew Ball | Trenton Curling Club, Trenton |
| Bryan Cochrane | Rich Moffatt | Colin Dow | John Steski | Rideau Curling Club, Ottawa |
| Peter Corner | Graeme McCarrel | Ian Tetley | Brad Savage | Brampton Curling Club, Brampton |
| Joe Frans | Adam Spencer | Scott Foster | Mike Anderson | Thornhill Curling Club, Thornhill |
| Chris Gardner | Brad Kidd | Mike Aprile | Sean Harrison | Arnprior Curling Club, Arnprior |
| Glenn Howard | Richard Hart | Brent Laing | Craig Savill | Coldwater and District Curling Club, Coldwater |
| Rob Lobel | Steven Lobel | Steve Small | Stu Garner | Whitby Curling Club, Whitby |
| Robert Rumfeldt | Scott Hodgson | Greg Robinson | Nolan Simms | Guelph Curling Club, Guelph |
| Jason Young | Chad Allen | Tyler Morgan | Jay Allen | Brantford Curling Club, Brantford |
| Kirk Ziola | Darcy Tomchick | Scott McDonald | Paul Moffatt | Highland Curling Club, London |

== Standings ==
| Skip (Club) | W | L |
|---|---|---|
| Glenn Howard (Coldwater) | 10 | 0 |
| Bryan Cochrane (Rideau) | 9 | 1 |
| Robert Rumfeldt (Guelph) | 7 | 3 |
| Peter Corner (Brampton) | 7 | 3 |
| Joe Frans (Thornhill) | 6 | 4 |
| Rob Lobel (Whitby) | 4 | 6 |
| Mark Bice (Tara) | 3 | 7 |
| Chris Ciasnocha (Trenton) | 3 | 7 |
| Jason Young (Brantford) | 3 | 7 |
| Kirk Ziola (Highland) | 2 | 8 |
| Chris Gardner (Arnprior) | 1 | 9 |

== Scores ==
=== Draw 1 ===
February 1, 14:00

| Sheet A | 1 | 2 | 3 | 4 | 5 | 6 | 7 | 8 | 9 | 10 | Final |
|---|---|---|---|---|---|---|---|---|---|---|---|
| Jason Young | 0 | 2 | 0 | 0 | 2 | 0 | 2 | 0 | 1 | X | 7 |
| Glenn Howard 🔨 | 2 | 0 | 2 | 0 | 0 | 2 | 0 | 3 | 0 | X | 9 |

| Sheet B | 1 | 2 | 3 | 4 | 5 | 6 | 7 | 8 | 9 | 10 | 11 | Final |
|---|---|---|---|---|---|---|---|---|---|---|---|---|
| Peter Corner 🔨 | 0 | 1 | 0 | 2 | 0 | 2 | 0 | 2 | 0 | 0 | 1 | 8 |
| Chris Ciasnocha | 0 | 0 | 2 | 0 | 1 | 0 | 1 | 0 | 2 | 1 | 0 | 7 |

| Sheet C | 1 | 2 | 3 | 4 | 5 | 6 | 7 | 8 | 9 | 10 | Final |
|---|---|---|---|---|---|---|---|---|---|---|---|
| Kirk Ziola 🔨 | 2 | 0 | 0 | 1 | 0 | 0 | 1 | 0 | 2 | 0 | 6 |
| Bryan Cochrane | 0 | 3 | 1 | 0 | 2 | 1 | 0 | 1 | 0 | 1 | 9 |

| Sheet D | 1 | 2 | 3 | 4 | 5 | 6 | 7 | 8 | 9 | 10 | Final |
|---|---|---|---|---|---|---|---|---|---|---|---|
| Rob Lobel | 0 | 1 | 0 | 2 | 0 | 1 | 0 | 1 | 0 | X | 5 |
| Robert Rumfeldt 🔨 | 2 | 0 | 1 | 0 | 1 | 0 | 2 | 0 | 2 | X | 8 |

| Sheet E | 1 | 2 | 3 | 4 | 5 | 6 | 7 | 8 | 9 | 10 | Final |
|---|---|---|---|---|---|---|---|---|---|---|---|
| Joe Frans 🔨 | 1 | 0 | 0 | 1 | 0 | 2 | 0 | 3 | 0 | 1 | 8 |
| Mark Bice | 0 | 2 | 1 | 0 | 1 | 0 | 2 | 0 | 1 | 0 | 7 |

=== Draw 2 ===
February 1, 19:15

| Sheet A | 1 | 2 | 3 | 4 | 5 | 6 | 7 | 8 | 9 | 10 | Final |
|---|---|---|---|---|---|---|---|---|---|---|---|
| Bryan Cochrane 🔨 | 2 | 0 | 3 | 0 | 0 | 2 | 0 | 1 | 0 | X | 8 |
| Robert Rumfeldt | 0 | 1 | 0 | 2 | 0 | 0 | 1 | 0 | 2 | X | 6 |

| Sheet B | 1 | 2 | 3 | 4 | 5 | 6 | 7 | 8 | 9 | 10 | Final |
|---|---|---|---|---|---|---|---|---|---|---|---|
| Joe Frans 🔨 | 0 | 2 | 0 | 2 | 0 | 0 | 1 | X | X | X | 5 |
| Peter Corner | 0 | 0 | 3 | 0 | 2 | 3 | 0 | X | X | X | 8 |

| Sheet C | 1 | 2 | 3 | 4 | 5 | 6 | 7 | 8 | 9 | 10 | Final |
|---|---|---|---|---|---|---|---|---|---|---|---|
| Glenn Howard 🔨 | 1 | 0 | 2 | 0 | 1 | 0 | 1 | 0 | 4 | X | 9 |
| Mark Bice | 0 | 1 | 0 | 2 | 0 | 2 | 0 | 1 | 0 | X | 6 |

| Sheet D | 1 | 2 | 3 | 4 | 5 | 6 | 7 | 8 | 9 | 10 | Final |
|---|---|---|---|---|---|---|---|---|---|---|---|
| Jason Young 🔨 | 2 | 0 | 1 | 3 | 0 | 2 | X | X | X | X | 8 |
| Chris Gardner | 0 | 1 | 0 | 0 | 2 | 0 | X | X | X | X | 3 |

| Sheet E | 1 | 2 | 3 | 4 | 5 | 6 | 7 | 8 | 9 | 10 | Final |
|---|---|---|---|---|---|---|---|---|---|---|---|
| Kirk Ziola | 0 | 1 | 1 | 0 | 2 | 1 | 0 | 0 | 0 | 0 | 5 |
| Chris Ciasnocha 🔨 | 2 | 0 | 0 | 2 | 0 | 0 | 1 | 1 | 0 | 1 | 7 |

=== Draw 3 ===
February 2, 14:00

| Sheet A | 1 | 2 | 3 | 4 | 5 | 6 | 7 | 8 | 9 | 10 | Final |
|---|---|---|---|---|---|---|---|---|---|---|---|
| Mark Bice | 1 | 0 | 4 | 0 | 1 | 0 | 1 | 0 | 0 | X | 7 |
| Chris Gardner 🔨 | 0 | 2 | 0 | 2 | 0 | 6 | 0 | 1 | 1 | X | 12 |

| Sheet B | 1 | 2 | 3 | 4 | 5 | 6 | 7 | 8 | 9 | 10 | 11 | Final |
|---|---|---|---|---|---|---|---|---|---|---|---|---|
| Kirk Ziola | 0 | 1 | 0 | 1 | 0 | 0 | 1 | 0 | 3 | 1 | 1 | 8 |
| Joe Frans 🔨 | 2 | 0 | 0 | 0 | 2 | 1 | 0 | 2 | 0 | 0 | 0 | 7 |

| Sheet C | 1 | 2 | 3 | 4 | 5 | 6 | 7 | 8 | 9 | 10 | Final |
|---|---|---|---|---|---|---|---|---|---|---|---|
| Robert Rumfeldt 🔨 | 2 | 0 | 2 | 0 | 4 | 1 | 0 | 1 | X | X | 10 |
| Chris Ciasnocha | 0 | 1 | 0 | 2 | 0 | 0 | 1 | 0 | X | X | 4 |

| Sheet D | 1 | 2 | 3 | 4 | 5 | 6 | 7 | 8 | 9 | 10 | Final |
|---|---|---|---|---|---|---|---|---|---|---|---|
| Bryan Cochrane 🔨 | 1 | 1 | 0 | 0 | 5 | 0 | 1 | X | X | X | 8 |
| Ron Lobel | 0 | 0 | 1 | 0 | 0 | 1 | 0 | X | X | X | 2 |

| Sheet E | 1 | 2 | 3 | 4 | 5 | 6 | 7 | 8 | 9 | 10 | Final |
|---|---|---|---|---|---|---|---|---|---|---|---|
| Glenn Howard | 0 | 1 | 1 | 1 | 0 | 1 | 0 | 0 | 0 | 1 | 5 |
| Peter Corner 🔨 | 1 | 0 | 0 | 0 | 1 | 0 | 0 | 1 | 1 | 0 | 4 |

=== Draw 4 ===
February 2, 19:00

| Sheet A | 1 | 2 | 3 | 4 | 5 | 6 | 7 | 8 | 9 | 10 | Final |
|---|---|---|---|---|---|---|---|---|---|---|---|
| Chris Ciasnocha 🔨 | 1 | 0 | 1 | 0 | 3 | 0 | 1 | 0 | 2 | X | 8 |
| Ron Lobel | 0 | 1 | 0 | 1 | 0 | 1 | 0 | 1 | 0 | X | 4 |

| Sheet B | 1 | 2 | 3 | 4 | 5 | 6 | 7 | 8 | 9 | 10 | Final |
|---|---|---|---|---|---|---|---|---|---|---|---|
| Glenn Howard | 2 | 0 | 3 | 0 | 4 | X | X | X | X | X | 9 |
| Kirk Ziola 🔨 | 0 | 1 | 0 | 2 | 0 | X | X | X | X | X | 3 |

| Sheet C | 1 | 2 | 3 | 4 | 5 | 6 | 7 | 8 | 9 | 10 | Final |
|---|---|---|---|---|---|---|---|---|---|---|---|
| Chris Gardner 🔨 | 0 | 0 | 2 | 1 | 0 | 0 | 0 | 2 | 0 | X | 5 |
| Peter Corner | 1 | 2 | 0 | 0 | 1 | 1 | 1 | 0 | 2 | X | 8 |

| Sheet D | 1 | 2 | 3 | 4 | 5 | 6 | 7 | 8 | 9 | 10 | Final |
|---|---|---|---|---|---|---|---|---|---|---|---|
| Mark Bice 🔨 | 1 | 0 | 3 | 0 | 1 | 0 | 1 | 0 | 0 | 2 | 8 |
| Jason Young | 0 | 2 | 0 | 1 | 0 | 1 | 0 | 1 | 1 | 0 | 6 |

| Sheet E | 1 | 2 | 3 | 4 | 5 | 6 | 7 | 8 | 9 | 10 | Final |
|---|---|---|---|---|---|---|---|---|---|---|---|
| Robert Rumfeldt | 0 | 0 | 1 | 0 | 0 | 0 | 2 | 0 | 2 | 0 | 5 |
| Joe Frans 🔨 | 0 | 1 | 0 | 1 | 1 | 1 | 0 | 3 | 0 | 2 | 9 |

=== Draw 5 ===
February 3, 09:00

| Sheet A | 1 | 2 | 3 | 4 | 5 | 6 | 7 | 8 | 9 | 10 | Final |
|---|---|---|---|---|---|---|---|---|---|---|---|
| Peter Corner | 1 | 0 | 3 | 0 | 1 | 0 | 2 | 0 | 0 | 1 | 8 |
| Jason Young 🔨 | 0 | 2 | 0 | 1 | 0 | 1 | 0 | 1 | 2 | 0 | 7 |

| Sheet B | 1 | 2 | 3 | 4 | 5 | 6 | 7 | 8 | 9 | 10 | Final |
|---|---|---|---|---|---|---|---|---|---|---|---|
| Robert Rumfeldt | 0 | 1 | 0 | 0 | 1 | 0 | X | X | X | X | 2 |
| Glenn Howard | 3 | 0 | 0 | 3 | 0 | 2 | X | X | X | X | 8 |

| Sheet C | 1 | 2 | 3 | 4 | 5 | 6 | 7 | 8 | 9 | 10 | Final |
|---|---|---|---|---|---|---|---|---|---|---|---|
| Ron Lobel | 0 | 1 | 0 | 3 | 0 | 0 | 0 | 0 | 0 | X | 4 |
| Joe Frans 🔨 | 0 | 0 | 3 | 0 | 2 | 0 | 0 | 1 | 3 | X | 9 |

| Sheet D | 1 | 2 | 3 | 4 | 5 | 6 | 7 | 8 | 9 | 10 | Final |
|---|---|---|---|---|---|---|---|---|---|---|---|
| Chris Ciasnocha 🔨 | 1 | 0 | 1 | 0 | 0 | 1 | 0 | 1 | X | X | 4 |
| Bryan Cochrane | 0 | 2 | 0 | 4 | 1 | 0 | 1 | 0 | X | X | 8 |

| Sheet E | 1 | 2 | 3 | 4 | 5 | 6 | 7 | 8 | 9 | 10 | Final |
|---|---|---|---|---|---|---|---|---|---|---|---|
| Chris Gardner 🔨 | 2 | 0 | 0 | 1 | 1 | 0 | 2 | 0 | 1 | X | 7 |
| Kirk Ziola | 0 | 1 | 3 | 0 | 0 | 3 | 0 | 2 | 0 | X | 9 |

=== Draw 6 ===
February 3, 14:00

| Sheet A | 1 | 2 | 3 | 4 | 5 | 6 | 7 | 8 | 9 | 10 | Final |
|---|---|---|---|---|---|---|---|---|---|---|---|
| Joe Frans 🔨 | 1 | 2 | 0 | 0 | 0 | 2 | 0 | 1 | 0 | 0 | 6 |
| Bryan Cochrane | 0 | 0 | 1 | 1 | 0 | 0 | 2 | 0 | 0 | 3 | 7 |

| Sheet B | 1 | 2 | 3 | 4 | 5 | 6 | 7 | 8 | 9 | 10 | Final |
|---|---|---|---|---|---|---|---|---|---|---|---|
| Chris Gardner | 1 | 0 | 0 | 1 | 0 | 2 | 0 | 1 | 0 | X | 5 |
| Robert Rumfeldt 🔨 | 0 | 1 | 2 | 0 | 1 | 0 | 1 | 0 | 2 | X | 7 |

| Sheet C | 1 | 2 | 3 | 4 | 5 | 6 | 7 | 8 | 9 | 10 | Final |
|---|---|---|---|---|---|---|---|---|---|---|---|
| Jason Young 🔨 | 1 | 0 | 1 | 2 | 1 | 0 | 1 | 0 | 0 | 1 | 7 |
| Kirk Ziola | 0 | 1 | 0 | 0 | 0 | 1 | 0 | 1 | 1 | 0 | 4 |

| Sheet D | 1 | 2 | 3 | 4 | 5 | 6 | 7 | 8 | 9 | 10 | Final |
|---|---|---|---|---|---|---|---|---|---|---|---|
| Peter Corner 🔨 | 3 | 0 | 2 | 0 | 1 | 0 | 2 | 0 | 0 | 1 | 9 |
| Mark Bice | 0 | 1 | 0 | 2 | 0 | 2 | 0 | 1 | 1 | 0 | 7 |

| Sheet E | 1 | 2 | 3 | 4 | 5 | 6 | 7 | 8 | 9 | 10 | 11 | Final |
|---|---|---|---|---|---|---|---|---|---|---|---|---|
| Ron Lobel 🔨 | 0 | 3 | 0 | 0 | 0 | 0 | 2 | 0 | 2 | 0 | 0 | 7 |
| Glenn Howard | 0 | 0 | 1 | 1 | 1 | 1 | 0 | 1 | 0 | 2 | 3 | 10 |

=== Draw 7 ===
February 3, 19:00

| Sheet A | 1 | 2 | 3 | 4 | 5 | 6 | 7 | 8 | 9 | 10 | Final |
|---|---|---|---|---|---|---|---|---|---|---|---|
| Kirk Ziola 🔨 | 2 | 0 | 1 | 0 | 1 | 0 | 0 | 1 | X | X | 5 |
| Mark Bice | 0 | 3 | 0 | 2 | 0 | 1 | 2 | 0 | X | X | 8 |

| Sheet B | 1 | 2 | 3 | 4 | 5 | 6 | 7 | 8 | 9 | 10 | Final |
|---|---|---|---|---|---|---|---|---|---|---|---|
| Ron Lobel 🔨 | 2 | 0 | 3 | 0 | 0 | 3 | 0 | 0 | 1 | 1 | 10 |
| Chris Gardner | 0 | 2 | 0 | 0 | 2 | 0 | 1 | 2 | 0 | 0 | 7 |

| Sheet C | 1 | 2 | 3 | 4 | 5 | 6 | 7 | 8 | 9 | 10 | Final |
|---|---|---|---|---|---|---|---|---|---|---|---|
| Bryan Cochrane | 0 | 1 | 0 | 1 | 0 | 1 | 0 | 0 | 0 | X | 3 |
| Glenn Howard 🔨 | 2 | 0 | 1 | 0 | 2 | 0 | 0 | 1 | 2 | X | 8 |

| Sheet D | 1 | 2 | 3 | 4 | 5 | 6 | 7 | 8 | 9 | 10 | Final |
|---|---|---|---|---|---|---|---|---|---|---|---|
| Joe Frans 🔨 | 2 | 2 | 0 | 2 | 2 | X | X | X | X | X | 8 |
| Chris Ciasnocha | 0 | 0 | 1 | 0 | 0 | X | X | X | X | X | 1 |

| Sheet E | 1 | 2 | 3 | 4 | 5 | 6 | 7 | 8 | 9 | 10 | Final |
|---|---|---|---|---|---|---|---|---|---|---|---|
| Jason Young | 0 | 0 | 1 | 0 | 1 | 0 | 2 | 0 | 0 | X | 4 |
| Robert Rumfeldt 🔨 | 1 | 1 | 0 | 0 | 0 | 1 | 0 | 3 | 2 | X | 8 |

=== Draw 8 ===
February 4, 14:00

| Sheet A | 1 | 2 | 3 | 4 | 5 | 6 | 7 | 8 | 9 | 10 | Final |
|---|---|---|---|---|---|---|---|---|---|---|---|
| Glenn Howard | 2 | 0 | 3 | 0 | 0 | 0 | X | X | X | X | 5 |
| Chris Ciasnocha 🔨 | 0 | 1 | 0 | 1 | 0 | 0 | X | X | X | X | 2 |

| Sheet B | 1 | 2 | 3 | 4 | 5 | 6 | 7 | 8 | 9 | 10 | Final |
|---|---|---|---|---|---|---|---|---|---|---|---|
| Jason Young 🔨 | 2 | 1 | 0 | 0 | 2 | 0 | 0 | 0 | 2 | 1 | 8 |
| Rob Lobel | 0 | 0 | 1 | 1 | 0 | 1 | 3 | 3 | 0 | 0 | 9 |

| Sheet C | 1 | 2 | 3 | 4 | 5 | 6 | 7 | 8 | 9 | 10 | Final |
|---|---|---|---|---|---|---|---|---|---|---|---|
| Mark Bice 🔨 | 1 | 0 | 0 | 0 | 0 | X | X | X | X | X | 1 |
| Robert Rumfeldt | 0 | 3 | 1 | 3 | 3 | X | X | X | X | X | 10 |

| Sheet D | 1 | 2 | 3 | 4 | 5 | 6 | 7 | 8 | 9 | 10 | Final |
|---|---|---|---|---|---|---|---|---|---|---|---|
| Kirk Ziola | 0 | 1 | 0 | 1 | 2 | 0 | 1 | 0 | X | X | 5 |
| Peter Corner 🔨 | 3 | 0 | 2 | 0 | 0 | 2 | 0 | 3 | X | X | 10 |

| Sheet E | 1 | 2 | 3 | 4 | 5 | 6 | 7 | 8 | 9 | 10 | Final |
|---|---|---|---|---|---|---|---|---|---|---|---|
| Bryan Cochrane 🔨 | 3 | 0 | 1 | 0 | 4 | 0 | X | X | X | X | 8 |
| Chris Gardner | 0 | 1 | 0 | 1 | 0 | 1 | X | X | X | X | 3 |

=== Draw 9 ===
February 4, 19:00

| Sheet A | 1 | 2 | 3 | 4 | 5 | 6 | 7 | 8 | 9 | 10 | Final |
|---|---|---|---|---|---|---|---|---|---|---|---|
| Robert Rumfeldt | 0 | 2 | 0 | 0 | 0 | 2 | 0 | 1 | 0 | 4 | 9 |
| Peter Corner | 2 | 0 | 1 | 0 | 0 | 0 | 1 | 0 | 1 | 0 | 5 |

| Sheet B | 1 | 2 | 3 | 4 | 5 | 6 | 7 | 8 | 9 | 10 | Final |
|---|---|---|---|---|---|---|---|---|---|---|---|
| Bryan Cochrane 🔨 | 4 | 0 | 1 | 0 | 2 | 2 | X | X | X | X | 9 |
| Jason Young | 0 | 3 | 0 | 1 | 0 | 0 | X | X | X | X | 4 |

| Sheet C | 1 | 2 | 3 | 4 | 5 | 6 | 7 | 8 | 9 | 10 | Final |
|---|---|---|---|---|---|---|---|---|---|---|---|
| Chris Ciasnocha 🔨 | 2 | 0 | 1 | 0 | 0 | 1 | 0 | 0 | 3 | 0 | 7 |
| Chris Gardner | 0 | 1 | 0 | 1 | 1 | 0 | 0 | 2 | 0 | 1 | 6 |

| Sheet D | 1 | 2 | 3 | 4 | 5 | 6 | 7 | 8 | 9 | 10 | Final |
|---|---|---|---|---|---|---|---|---|---|---|---|
| Glenn Howard | 2 | 0 | 2 | 0 | 0 | X | X | X | X | X | 4 |
| Joe Frans 🔨 | 0 | 0 | 0 | 0 | 1 | X | X | X | X | X | 1 |

| Sheet E | 1 | 2 | 3 | 4 | 5 | 6 | 7 | 8 | 9 | 10 | Final |
|---|---|---|---|---|---|---|---|---|---|---|---|
| Mark Bice | 0 | 0 | 1 | 0 | 0 | 2 | 0 | 0 | 0 | 0 | 3 |
| Rob Lobel 🔨 | 0 | 1 | 0 | 0 | 1 | 0 | 1 | 1 | 0 | 1 | 5 |

=== Draw 10 ===
February 5, 14:00

| Sheet A | 1 | 2 | 3 | 4 | 5 | 6 | 7 | 8 | 9 | 10 | Final |
|---|---|---|---|---|---|---|---|---|---|---|---|
| Chris Gardner | 0 | 0 | 3 | 0 | 0 | 2 | 1 | 0 | 0 | X | 6 |
| Joe Frans 🔨 | 0 | 2 | 0 | 1 | 3 | 0 | 0 | 3 | 1 | X | 10 |

| Sheet B | 1 | 2 | 3 | 4 | 5 | 6 | 7 | 8 | 9 | 10 | Final |
|---|---|---|---|---|---|---|---|---|---|---|---|
| Mark Bice | 0 | 1 | 0 | 2 | 0 | 0 | 1 | 0 | 0 | X | 4 |
| Bryan Cochrane 🔨 | 1 | 0 | 2 | 0 | 1 | 2 | 0 | 2 | 2 | X | 10 |

| Sheet C | 1 | 2 | 3 | 4 | 5 | 6 | 7 | 8 | 9 | 10 | Final |
|---|---|---|---|---|---|---|---|---|---|---|---|
| Peter Corner 🔨 | 1 | 0 | 1 | 3 | 0 | 0 | 2 | X | X | X | 7 |
| Rob Lobel | 0 | 0 | 0 | 0 | 1 | 0 | 0 | X | X | X | 1 |

| Sheet D | 1 | 2 | 3 | 4 | 5 | 6 | 7 | 8 | 9 | 10 | Final |
|---|---|---|---|---|---|---|---|---|---|---|---|
| Robert Rumfeldt 🔨 | 1 | 0 | 2 | 1 | 0 | 0 | 1 | 0 | X | X | 5 |
| Kirk Ziola | 0 | 1 | 0 | 0 | 1 | 0 | 0 | 1 | X | X | 3 |

| Sheet E | 1 | 2 | 3 | 4 | 5 | 6 | 7 | 8 | 9 | 10 | Final |
|---|---|---|---|---|---|---|---|---|---|---|---|
| Chris Ciasnocha | 0 | 0 | 2 | 0 | 1 | 0 | X | X | X | X | 3 |
| Jason Young 🔨 | 3 | 2 | 0 | 4 | 0 | 1 | X | X | X | X | 10 |

=== Draw 11 ===
February 5, 19:00

| Sheet A | 1 | 2 | 3 | 4 | 5 | 6 | 7 | 8 | 9 | 10 | Final |
|---|---|---|---|---|---|---|---|---|---|---|---|
| Rob Lobel | 0 | 1 | 0 | 3 | 0 | 2 | 1 | 2 | 1 | X | 10 |
| Kirk Ziola 🔨 | 2 | 0 | 1 | 0 | 2 | 0 | 0 | 0 | 0 | X | 5 |

| Sheet B | 1 | 2 | 3 | 4 | 5 | 6 | 7 | 8 | 9 | 10 | Final |
|---|---|---|---|---|---|---|---|---|---|---|---|
| Chris Ciasnocha 🔨 | 0 | 2 | 0 | 0 | 2 | 1 | 1 | 0 | 1 | 0 | 7 |
| Mark Bice | 3 | 0 | 0 | 1 | 0 | 0 | 0 | 2 | 0 | 3 | 9 |

| Sheet C | 1 | 2 | 3 | 4 | 5 | 6 | 7 | 8 | 9 | 10 | 11 | Final |
|---|---|---|---|---|---|---|---|---|---|---|---|---|
| Joe Frans | 1 | 0 | 3 | 0 | 2 | 0 | 1 | 0 | 1 | 0 | 2 | 10 |
| Jason Young 🔨 | 0 | 1 | 0 | 0 | 0 | 3 | 0 | 3 | 0 | 1 | 0 | 8 |

| Sheet D | 1 | 2 | 3 | 4 | 5 | 6 | 7 | 8 | 9 | 10 | Final |
|---|---|---|---|---|---|---|---|---|---|---|---|
| Chris Gardner 🔨 | 0 | 2 | 0 | 0 | 0 | 0 | X | X | X | X | 2 |
| Glenn Howard | 5 | 0 | 1 | 1 | 0 | 3 | X | X | X | X | 10 |

| Sheet E | 1 | 2 | 3 | 4 | 5 | 6 | 7 | 8 | 9 | 10 | Final |
|---|---|---|---|---|---|---|---|---|---|---|---|
| Peter Corner | 0 | 0 | 2 | 0 | 1 | 0 | 2 | 0 | 1 | X | 6 |
| Bryan Cochrane 🔨 | 3 | 1 | 0 | 0 | 0 | 3 | 0 | 2 | 0 | X | 9 |

== Playoffs ==
Page playoff system
1 | Glenn Howard | 6
2 | Bryan Cochrane | 4
3 | Robert Rumfeldt | 4
4 | Peter Corner | 7

Semifinal
2 | Bryan Cochrane | 12
4 | Peter Corner | 5

Final
1 | Glenn Howard | 5
2 | Bryan Cochrane | 3

=== 1 vs. 2 ===
February 6, 1400

| Team | 1 | 2 | 3 | 4 | 5 | 6 | 7 | 8 | 9 | 10 | Final |
|---|---|---|---|---|---|---|---|---|---|---|---|
| Glenn Howard 🔨 | 2 | 0 | 0 | 0 | 3 | 0 | 0 | 0 | 0 | 1 | 6 |
| Bryan Cochrane | 0 | 2 | 0 | 0 | 0 | 0 | 1 | 0 | 1 | 0 | 4 |

=== 3 vs. 4 ===
February 6, 1900

| Team | 1 | 2 | 3 | 4 | 5 | 6 | 7 | 8 | 9 | 10 | Final |
|---|---|---|---|---|---|---|---|---|---|---|---|
| Robert Rumfeldt 🔨 | 2 | 0 | 1 | 0 | 0 | 0 | 0 | 1 | 0 | X | 4 |
| Peter Corner | 0 | 2 | 0 | 0 | 1 | 1 | 0 | 0 | 3 | X | 7 |

=== Semifinal ===
February 7, 930

| Team | 1 | 2 | 3 | 4 | 5 | 6 | 7 | 8 | 9 | 10 | Final |
|---|---|---|---|---|---|---|---|---|---|---|---|
| Peter Corner | 0 | 1 | 0 | 0 | 3 | 0 | 1 | 0 | X | X | 5 |
| Bryan Cochrane 🔨 | 3 | 0 | 2 | 1 | 0 | 2 | 0 | 4 | X | X | 12 |

=== Final ===
February 7, 1400

| Team | 1 | 2 | 3 | 4 | 5 | 6 | 7 | 8 | 9 | 10 | Final |
|---|---|---|---|---|---|---|---|---|---|---|---|
| Glenn Howard 🔨 | 0 | 1 | 1 | 0 | 1 | 0 | 1 | 0 | 0 | 1 | 5 |
| Bryan Cochrane | 0 | 0 | 0 | 1 | 0 | 0 | 0 | 1 | 1 | 0 | 3 |

== Zone playdowns ==
Teams entered by OCA Zone

=== Zone 1 ===
December 11–13, Ottawa Curling Club

- Charles Wert (Cornwall)
- Brian Fleischhaker (Ottawa)
- Gary Rowe (Ottawa)
- Shane Latimer (Ottawa)
- Kevin McConnell (Ottawa)
- Brian Lewis (Ottawa)
- Mathew Camm (Navan)

=== Zone 2 ===
December 11–13, Ottawa Curling Club

- J.P. Lachance (Rideau)
- Bill Blad (Rideau)
- Mark Leger (Rideau)
- Daryl Smith (Rideau)
- Tim March (Brockville)
- Howard Rajala (Rideau)
- Bryan Cochrane (Rideau)
- Frank O'Driscoll (Rideau)
- Greg Richardson (Rideau)

=== Zone 3 ===
December 12–13, Arnprior Curling Club

- Steve Allen (Arnprior)
- Chris Gardner (Arnprior)
- Doug Johnston (Arnprior)
- Damien Villard (Renfrew)
- Bruce Delaney (Renfrew)
- Steve Lodge (Renfrew)
- Roch Cote (City View)

=== Zone 4 ===
December 4–6, Land O'Lakes Curling Club, Tweed

- Bryce Rowe (Land O'Lakes)
- Dave Collyer (Quinte)
- Sean Meleschuk (Royal Kingston)
- Josh Adams (Stirling)
- Paul Aitken (Trenton)
- Christopher Ciasnocha (Trenton)
- Scott Kerr (Trenton)
- Greg Balsdon (Loonie)
- Scott Buckley (Cataraqui)
- Jim Marshall (Land O'Lakes)
- Paul Dickson (Napanee)
- Dennis Murray (Quinte)

=== Zone 5 ===
December 19–20, Beaverton Curling Club

- Jake Speedie (Beaverton)
- Wayne Warren (Cannington)
- Kent Beddows (Cannington)
- Dave Nigh (Lindsay)
- Tyler Jones (Peterborough)
- Norm McLaughlin (Peterborough)
- Keith Furevick (Peterborough)
- Bill Harrison (Woodville)

=== Zone 6 ===
December 4–6, Annandale Country Club, Ajax

- Jason March (Annandale)
- Jeff Clark (Dalewood)
- Bruce Jefferson (Uxbridge)
- Rob Lobel (Whitby)
- John Bell (Unionville)
- Scott McPherson (Unionville)
- Brian Studdard (Oshawa)

=== Zone 7 ===
December 12–15 at the Toronto Cricket, Skating & Curling Club

- Aiden Ritchie (East York)
- Gregg Truscott (Scarboro)
- Tim Morrison (Scarboro)
- Dave Coutanche (Richmond Hill)
- Dennis Moretto (Richmond Hill)
- Peter Matthews (Richmond Hill)
- Joe Frans (Thornhill)
- Henrik Londen (Toronto Cricket)
- Michael Shepherd (East York)
- Darryl Prebble (Scarboro)
- Duane Lindner (Richmond Hill)
- Jeff Flanagan (Toronto Cricket)

=== Zone 8 ===
December 18–20, High Park Club

- Paul Gareau (Oakville)
- Ian Fleming (Royal Canadian)
- Guy Racette (Royal Canadian)
- Roy Arndt (High Park)
- Colin McMichael (High Park)
- Bill Duck (St. George's)
- Gary Grant (Oakville)

=== Zone 9 ===
December 4–5, Acton Curling Club

- Peter Corner (Brampton)
- Dayna Deruelle (Brampton)
- Rob Lipsett (Markdale)
- Steve Odsford (Milton)
- Alex Foster (North Halton)
- Tom Little (Shelburne)

=== Zone 10 ===
December 19–20, South Muskoka Curling & Golf Club, Bracebridge

- Rick Dafoe (Bradford)
- Cory Heggestad (Stroud)
- Andrew Thompson (Stroud)
- Greg Bruce (Barrie)
- Dale Matchett (Bradford)
- G.W. King (Midland)

=== Zone 11 ===
December 4–6, Tara Curling Club

- Al Hutchinson (Blue Water)
- Patrick Greenman (Meaford)
- Patrick Armstrong (Port Elgin)
- Joey Rettinger (Tara)
- Al Corbeil (Collingwood)
- Steve Gregg (Paisley)
- Mark Bice (Tara)

=== Zone 12 ===
December 4–6 Arthur & Area Curling Club

- Frank Gowman (Galt)
- Robert Rumfeldt (Guelph)
- Andrew Fairfull (Guelph)
- Jared Collie (Kitchener-Waterloo Granite)
- Scott Buchan (Kitchener-Waterloo Granite)
- Peter Mellor (Kitchener-Waterloo Granite)
- Scott Lennox (Arthur)
- Trevor Feil (Elora)
- Ryan Sayer (Kitchener-Waterloo Granite)
- Daryl Shane (Kitchener-Waterloo Granite)
- Mark Kean (Westmount)

=== Zone 13 ===
December 18–21, Glendale Golf & Country Club, Hamilton

- Brent Palmer (Burlington)
- Mike Rowe (Burlington)
- Rick Thurston (Dundas Granite)
- Todd Maslin (Dundas Granite)
- Steve Henderson (Dundas Granite)
- Ron Long (Dundas Granite)
- Simon Ouellet (Glendale)
- Garth Mitchell (Grimsby)
- Matt Wilkinson (St. Catharines Golf)
- Shane McCready (St. Catharines Golf)
- Kris Blonski (Dundas)
- Todd Brandwood (Glendale)
- Joe Lococo (Niagara Falls)

=== Zone 14 ===
December 4–6, Walkerton Golf & Country Club

- Mike Nielsen (Walkerton)
- Jake Higgs (Harriston)
- Pat Ferris (Listowel)
- Matt Mapletoft (Palmerston)

=== Zone 15 ===
December 4–6, Tavistock Curling Club

- Dale Kelly (Brant)
- Jason Young (Brantford)
- Terry Corbin (Woodstock)
- Dave Vandenbroek (St. Thomas)
- Gareth Parry (Brant)
- Aaron Ward (Simcoe)

=== Zone 16 ===
December 4–6, Glencoe & District Curling Club

- Jerry Ferster (Chatham)
- Robert Stafford (Chatham)
- Bill Mitchell (Glencoe)
- Kirk Ziola (Highland)
- Dustin Kroeker (Ilderton)
- Bob Ingram (Ridgetown)
- Rob Pruliere (Sarnia)
- Heath McCormick (Sarnia)
- Perry Smyth (Chatham)
- Andrew Willemsma (Kingsville)
- John McColl (Glencoe)
- Mike Pruliere (Sarnia)
