= 2009 TSC Stores Tankard =

- Host city: Woodstock, Ontario
- Arena: Woodstock District Community Complex
- Dates: February 2-8
- Winner: Team Howard
- Curling club: Coldwater & District CC, Coldwater
- Skip: Glenn Howard
- Third: Richard Hart
- Second: Brent Laing
- Lead: Craig Savill
- Finalist: Peter Corner

The 2009 TSC Stores Tankard was the 2009 edition of the Ontario provincial men's curling tournament. It was held on February 2-8 at the Woodstock District Community Complex in Woodstock, Ontario, Canada. The winning Glenn Howard team represented Ontario at the 2009 Tim Hortons Brier in Calgary, Alberta (who ended the tournament second in the standings).

== Teams ==
Skip	Vice	Second	Lead	Club
Bryan Cochrane	Rich Moffatt	Paul Winford	John Steski	Rideau Curling Club, Ottawa
Peter Corner	Graeme McCarrel	Ian Tetley	Brad Savage	Brampton Curling Club, Brampton
Joe Frans	Craig Kochan	Scott Foster	Ken McDermot	Oshawa Curling Club, Oshawa
Chris Gardner	Derek Abbotts	Brad Kidd	Sean Harrison	Arnprior Curling Club, Arnprior
Mike Harris	John Base	Phil Loevenmark	Tom Reed	Donalda Curling Club, Don Mills, Toronto
Jake Higgs*	Brent Ross	Andrew Clayton	Micky Lizmore	Harriston Curling Club, Harriston
Glenn Howard	Richard Hart	Brent Laing	Craig Savill	Coldwater & District Curling Club, Coldwater
Rob Lobel	Steve Lobel	Steve Small	Stu Garner	Whitby Curling Club, Whitby
Peter Steski	Heath McCormick	Chad McMullan	Jeff Steski	Sarnia Golf & Country Club, Point Edward
Rick Thurston	Scott Llewellyn	Kevin Caughlin	Ray Lappalainen	Dundas Granite Curling Club, Dundas

* Throws third stones

== Standings ==
Skip (Club)	W	L	PF	PA	Ends Won	Ends Lost	Blank Ends
Glenn Howard (Coldwater)	8	1	71	28	40	25	2
Peter Corner (Brampton)	7	2	71	49	44	33	4
Jake Higgs (Harriston)	6	3	65	59	41	34	5
Joe Frans (Oshawa)	6	3	61	52	37	36	3
Mike Harris (Donalda)	5	4	50	59	31	37	3
Rob Lobel (Whitby)	4	5	55	73	36	38	2
Peter Steski (Sarnia)	4	5	61	70	36	41	2
Chris Gardner (Arnprior)	3	6	57	65	36	42	4
Bryan Cochrane (Rideau)	2	7	52	66	35	38	3
Rick Thurston (Dundas)	0	9	44	66	35	47	4

== Results ==
=== Draw 1 ===
February 2, 14:00

Sheet A	1	2	3	4	5	6	7	8	9	10	Final
Bryan Cochrane	1	0	1	0	1	0	0	2	0	X	5
Joe Frans	0	2	0	2	0	1	2	0	1	X	8

Sheet B	1	2	3	4	5	6	7	8	9	10	Final
Jake Higgs	1	2	0	0	2	2	0	1	2	X	10
Mike Harris	0	0	0	3	0	0	1	0	0	X	4

Sheet C	1	2	3	4	5	6	7	8	9	10	Final
Rob Lobel	1	2	0	0	1	0	1	0	1	1	7
Rick Thurston	0	0	1	1	0	1	0	1	0	0	4

Sheet D	1	2	3	4	5	6	7	8	9	10	Final
Peter Steski	0	0	1	0	0	1	X	X	X	X	2
Glenn Howard	1	3	0	2	1	0	X	X	X	X	7

Sheet E	1	2	3	4	5	6	7	8	9	10	Final
Peter Corner	0	2	1	0	1	2	0	2	X	X	8
Chris Gardner	1	0	0	1	0	0	1	0	X	X	3

=== Draw 2 ===
February 2, 19:45

Sheet A	1	2	3	4	5	6	7	8	9	10	Final
Jake Higgs	2	1	0	3	1	0	0	1	0	1	9
Peter Corner	0	0	1	0	0	2	2	0	2	0	7

Sheet B	1	2	3	4	5	6	7	8	9	10	Final
Joe Frans	0	2	1	0	1	0	0	2	0	1	7
Rick Thurston	1	0	0	1	0	1	1	0	1	0	5

Sheet C	1	2	3	4	5	6	7	8	9	10	Final
Bryan Cochrane	0	0	1	0	0	1	X	X	X	X	2
Glenn Howard	3	1	0	2	1	0	X	X	X	X	7

Sheet D	1	2	3	4	5	6	7	8	9	10	Final
Mike Harris	1	1	1	1	0	0	0	1	0	X	5
Chris Gardner	0	0	0	0	2	0	1	0	1	X	4

Sheet E	1	2	3	4	5	6	7	8	9	10	Final
Rob Lobel	1	0	0	1	0	0	2	4	0	4	12
Peter Steski	0	2	1	0	1	2	0	0	2	0	8

=== Draw 3 ===
February 3, 14:00

Sheet A	1	2	3	4	5	6	7	8	9	10	11	Final
Rob Lobel	1	0	1	0	0	1	2	0	0	2	0	7
Mike Harris	0	3	0	2	1	0	0	1	0	0	1	8

Sheet B	1	2	3	4	5	6	7	8	9	10	Final
Glenn Howard	0	2	0	3	1	0	1	0	4	X	11
Chris Gardner	1	0	1	0	0	1	0	2	0	X	5

Sheet C	1	2	3	4	5	6	7	8	9	10	Final
Peter Steski	0	0	0	0	3	0	X	X	X	X	3
Joe Frans	1	2	0	2	0	4	X	X	X	X	9

Sheet D	1	2	3	4	5	6	7	8	9	10	Final
Peter Corner	1	0	1	1	0	0	0	3	2	X	8
Rick Thurston	0	1	0	0	3	0	0	0	0	X	4

Sheet E	1	2	3	4	5	6	7	8	9	10	Final
Jake Higgs	0	4	1	0	0	2	2	X	X	X	9
Bryan Cochrane	0	0	0	2	2	0	0	X	X	X	4

=== Draw 4 ===
February 3, 19:00

Sheet A	1	2	3	4	5	6	7	8	9	10	Final
Joe Frans	1	0	1	0	1	0	2	0	1	1	7
Glenn Howard	0	2	0	1	0	1	0	2	0	0	6

Sheet B	1	2	3	4	5	6	7	8	9	10	Final
Rob Lobel	3	0	1	1	0	1	0	3	0	X	9
Jake Higgs	0	1	0	0	2	0	3	0	0	X	6

Sheet C	1	2	3	4	5	6	7	8	9	10	Final
Mike Harris	0	0	1	0	1	0	0	1	X	X	3
Peter Corner	1	1	0	2	0	2	1	0	X	X	7

Sheet D	1	2	3	4	5	6	7	8	9	10	Final
Bryan Cochrane	0	0	1	0	1	2	0	0	1	X	5
Peter Steski	3	1	0	1	0	0	2	1	0	X	8

Sheet E	1	2	3	4	5	6	7	8	9	10	Final
Chris Gardner	1	0	2	0	1	0	1	0	2	X	7
Rick Thurston	0	1	0	1	0	1	0	1	0	X	4

=== Draw 5 ===
February 4, 14:00

Sheet A	1	2	3	4	5	6	7	8	9	10	Final
Rick Thurston	0	0	2	0	0	1	0	0	1	X	4
Bryan Cochrane	0	1	0	1	1	0	1	1	0	X	5

Sheet B	1	2	3	4	5	6	7	8	9	10	11	Final
Peter Steski	0	2	0	2	0	2	0	1	0	2	0	9
Peter Corner	1	0	2	0	1	0	4	0	1	0	1	10

Sheet C	1	2	3	4	5	6	7	8	9	10	Final
Jake Higgs	1	0	0	0	1	2	0	1	0	X	5
Chris Gardner	0	2	1	0	0	0	2	0	4	X	9

Sheet D	1	2	3	4	5	6	7	8	9	10	Final
Joe Frans	0	1	0	0	0	X	X	X	X	X	1
Mike Harris	1	0	4	1	3	X	X	X	X	X	9

Sheet E	1	2	3	4	5	6	7	8	9	10	Final
Glenn Howard	4	3	1	1	X	X	X	X	X	X	9
Rob Lobel	0	0	0	0	X	X	X	X	X	X	0

=== Draw 6 ===
February 4, 19:00

Sheet A	1	2	3	4	5	6	7	8	9	10	11	Final
Peter Steski	0	0	1	0	1	1	1	0	2	0	2	8
Chris Gardner	1	0	0	1	0	0	0	2	0	2	0	6

Sheet B	1	2	3	4	5	6	7	8	9	10	Final
Bryan Cochrane	0	2	1	0	1	0	2	1	0	4	11
Rob Lobel	2	0	0	1	0	2	0	0	1	0	6

Sheet C	1	2	3	4	5	6	7	8	9	10	Final
Glenn Howard	1	3	3	2	X	X	X	X	X	X	9
Mike Harris	0	0	0	0	X	X	X	X	X	X	0

Sheet D	1	2	3	4	5	6	7	8	9	10	Final
Rick Thurston	1	0	2	1	0	0	1	0	0	X	5
Jake Higgs	0	2	0	0	1	1	0	2	2	X	8

Sheet E	1	2	3	4	5	6	7	8	9	10	Final
Joe Frans	0	1	1	0	0	2	0	0	2	0	6
Peter Corner	2	0	0	3	1	0	1	1	0	1	9

=== Draw 7 ===
February 5, 14:00

Sheet A	1	2	3	4	5	6	7	8	9	10	Final
Glenn Howard	3	1	0	1	1	0	0	3	X	X	9
Jake Higgs	0	0	0	0	0	2	1	0	X	X	3

Sheet B	1	2	3	4	5	6	7	8	9	10	Final
Chris Gardner	1	0	1	0	0	0	1	0	1	X	4
Joe Frans	0	2	0	1	0	0	0	3	0	X	6

Sheet C	1	2	3	4	5	6	7	8	9	10	Final
Rick Thurston	0	2	0	2	1	0	0	2	0	0	7
Peter Steski	2	0	1	0	0	2	1	0	0	2	8

Sheet D	1	2	3	4	5	6	7	8	9	10	Final
Rob Lobel	0	1	1	0	0	X	X	X	X	X	2
Peter Corner	4	0	0	2	3	X	X	X	X	X	9

Sheet E	1	2	3	4	5	6	7	8	9	10	Final
Bryan Cochrane	0	1	1	0	1	0	1	X	X	X	4
Mike Harris	1	0	0	2	0	2	0	X	X	X	5

=== Draw 8 ===
February 5, 19:00

Sheet A	1	2	3	4	5	6	7	8	9	10	Final
Mike Harris	0	3	0	2	0	0	1	2	0	1	9
Rick Thurston	2	0	1	0	1	2	0	0	1	0	7

Sheet B	1	2	3	4	5	6	7	8	9	10	Final
Peter Corner	1	0	0	1	0	0	1	1	1	0	5
Glenn Howard	0	0	2	0	2	1	0	0	0	1	6

Sheet C	1	2	3	4	5	6	7	8	9	10	Final
Joe Frans	3	0	2	0	1	0	4	X	X	X	10
Rob Lobel	0	1	0	1	0	1	0	X	X	X	3

Sheet D	1	2	3	4	5	6	7	8	9	10	Final
Chris Gardner	2	2	0	0	4	0	1	0	2	X	11
Bryan Cochrane	0	0	2	2	0	3	0	2	0	X	9

Sheet E	1	2	3	4	5	6	7	8	9	10	Final
Peter Steski	0	0	0	0	1	0	2	0	2	X	5
Jake Higgs	1	1	1	1	0	1	0	2	0	X	7

=== Draw 9 ===
February 6, 14:00

Sheet A	1	2	3	4	5	6	7	8	9	10	Final
Chris Gardner	0	3	0	2	0	2	0	1	0	0	8
Rob Lobel	1	0	2	0	2	0	1	0	2	1	9

Sheet B	1	2	3	4	5	6	7	8	9	10	Final
Mike Harris	0	2	0	2	0	1	0	2	X	X	7
Peter Steski	3	0	1	0	1	0	5	0	X	X	10

Sheet C	1	2	3	4	5	6	7	8	9	10	Final
Peter Corner	0	1	0	2	0	1	2	0	0	2	8
Bryan Cochrane	1	0	2	0	2	0	0	2	0	0	7

Sheet D	1	2	3	4	5	6	7	8	9	10	Final
Jake Higgs	1	0	2	0	1	0	2	0	0	2	8
Joe Frans	0	2	0	1	0	1	0	2	1	0	7

Sheet E	1	2	3	4	5	6	7	8	9	10	Final
Rick Thurston	0	0	0	1	0	1	1	1	0	0	4
Glenn Howard	2	1	1	0	1	0	0	0	1	1	7

== Playoffs ==
Page playoff system
1	Glenn Howard	5
2	Peter Corner	4
3	Jake Higgs	5
4	Joe Frans	8

Semifinal
2	Peter Corner	8
4	Joe Frans	5

Final
1	Glenn Howard	8
2	Peter Corner	1

=== 3 vs. 4 ===
February 6, 1900

Team	1	2	3	4	5	6	7	8	9	10	Final
Joe Frans	0	0	0	2	0	2	1	1	1	1	8
Jake Higgs	0	0	2	0	3	0	0	0	0	0	5

=== 1 vs. 2 ===
February 7, 1400

Team	1	2	3	4	5	6	7	8	9	10	Final
Glenn Howard	1	1	0	1	0	0	0	1	0	1	5
Peter Corner	0	0	0	0	2	0	0	0	2	0	4

=== Semifinal ===
February 7, 1900

Team	1	2	3	4	5	6	7	8	9	10	Final
Joe Frans	0	0	1	0	2	1	0	1	0	X	5
Peter Corner	2	1	0	2	0	0	2	0	1	X	8

=== Final ===
Team	1	2	3	4	5	6	7	8	9	10	Final
Glenn Howard	3	3	1	0	1	X	X	X	X	X	8
Peter Corner	0	0	0	1	0	X	X	X	X	X	1

== Qualification ==
The tournament will consist of ten teams. Two from each of Southern Ontario's four regions and two from a provincial "last chance" qualification tournament. Teams from Northern Ontario will play in that region's provincial championship. Each of the four regions consist of four zones where two teams from which qualify for the regional tournaments.

== Zones ==
Teams in bold advanced to regionals. Teams in italics elected to play in the challenge round (see below).

=== Zone 1 ===
December 5-7, Navan Curling Club (Navan)

Teams:

- Jeff Comer (Cornwall)
- **Dave Murphy** (Glengarry)
- Ken Sullivan (Metcalfe)
- Gilles Allaire (Ottawa)
- Willie Jeffries (Ottawa)
- Justin Chubaty (RCMP)
- Charles Wert (Cornwall)
- Brian Fleischhaker (Ottawa)
- **Matthew Paul** (Ottawa)

=== Zone 2 ===
December 20-23, Rideau Curling Club (Ottawa)

Teams:

- Bill Blad (Rideau)
- Brian Benning (Rideau)
- **Gary Rowe** (Rideau)
- Howard Rajala (Rideau)
- Dan Baird (Rideau)
- Blair Dawes (Rideau)
- J. P. Lachance (Rideau)
- Daryl Smith (Rideau)
- **Bryan Cochrane** (Rideau)

=== Zone 3 ===
December 20-22, Carleton Place Curling Club (Carleton Place)

Teams:

- **Doug Johnston** (Arnprior)
- Steve Lodge (Carleton Place)
- Jeff McCrady (Carleton Place)
- Art Miskew (City View)
- Joshua Adams (Granite)
- Damien Villard (Renfrew)
- **Chris Gardner** (Arnprior)

=== Zone 4 ===
December 19-21, Marmora & Area Curling Club (Marmora)

Teams:

- Rob Dickson (Land O'Lakes)
- Bryce Rowe (Land O'Lakes)
- Dave Collyer (Quinte)
- Alex Tosh (Royal Kingston)
- Scott Kerr (Trenton)
- **Greg Balsdon** (Loonie)
- Jim Marshall (Land O'Lakes)
- **Ryan Ward** (Quinte)
- Paul Aitken (Trenton)

=== Zone 5 ===
December 6-8, Bobcaygeon Curling Club (Bobcaygeon)

Teams:

- Jake Speedie (Beaverton)
- Dave Nigh (Lindsay)
- **Mark Bice** (Peterborough)
- **John Collins** (Peterborough)
- Wayne Shea (Bobcaygeon)
- Lee Cooper (Lakefield)

=== Zone 6 ===
December 5-7, Annandale Country Club (Ajax)

Teams:

- Blair Metrakos (Annandale)
- Wes Johnson (Anandale)
- Jeff Clark (Dalewood)
- Brian Suddard (Oshawa)
- Jim Thedorf (Oshawa)
- Jon St. Denis (Oshawa)
- Joe Frans (Oshawa)
- Rob Steele (Port Perry)
- Troy Winch (Sutton)
- Bruce Jefferson (Uxbridge)
- **Greg Timbers** (Uxbridge)
- Gary Grant (Uxbridge)
- **Rob Lobel** (Whitby)
- Tim Morrison (Whitby)
- John Bell (Unionville)
- Scott McPherson (Unionville)

=== Zone 7 ===
December 19-21, Richmond Hill Curling Club (Richmond Hill)

Teams:

- **Mike Harris** (Donalda)
- Dennis Elgie (East York)
- Richard Van Dine (Leaside)
- Norm McGlaughlin (Leaside)
- Gregg Truscott (Scarboro)
- Mike Maddin (Richmond Hill)
- Ian Robertson (Thornhill)
- Eric Doner (York)
- Adrian Ritchie (East York)
- **Darryl Prebble** (Scarboro)
- Collin Mitchell (Scarboro)
- Guy Racette (Scarboro)
- Michael Keon (Richmond Hill)
- Jim Dyas (Richmond Hill)
- Dennis Moretto (Richmond Hill)
- Jeff Flanagan (Toronto Cricket)

=== Zone 8 ===
December 20-23, Dixie Curling Club (Mississauga)

Teams:

- Kevin Flewwelling (Royal Canadian)
- Scott McFadyen (High Park)
- **Bill Duck** (St. George's)
- **Wayne Middaugh** (St. George's)
- Jim Wilson (Oakville)
- Paul Gareau (Oakville)

=== Zone 9 ===
December 5-7, Markdale Golf & Curling Club (Markdale)

Teams:

- Len McNichol (Chinguacousy)
- Trevor Coburn (Markdale)
- **Alex Foster** (North Halton)
- Denis Cordick (North Halton)
- **Peter Corner** (Brampton)
- Steve Oldford (Milton)

=== Zone 10 ===
December 19-21, Penetanguishene Curling Club (Penetanguishene)

Teams:

- Rick Dafoe (Bradford)
- **Dale Matchett** (Churchill)
- Kevin Flemming (Elmvale)
- G.W. King (Midland)
- Bill Harrison (Penetanguishene)
- Andrew Thompson (Stroud)
- Bill Irwin (Barrie)
- **Glenn Howard** (Coldwater)

=== Zone 11 ===
December 5-7, Southampton Curling Club (Southampton)

Teams:

- Dave Twining (Blue Water)
- **Al Hutchinson** (Blue Water)
- Pat Duggan (Meaford)
- Curtis Cassidy (Port Elgin)
- Terry Corbin (Port Elgin)
- Cory Heggestad (Collingwood)
- **Al Corbeil** (Collingwood)

=== Zone 12 ===
December 5-7, Westmount Golf & Country Club (Kitchener)

Teams:

- Trevor Feil (Elora)
- Gary Darroch (Fergus)
- Scott Hodgson (Guelph)
- Andrew Fairfull (Guelph)
- Marc Joyce (Kitchener-Waterloo Granite)
- **Daryl Shane** (Kitchener-Waterloo Granite)
- **Mike Anderson** (Kitchener-Waterloo Granite)
- Mark Kean (Kitchener-Waterloo Granite)
- Peter Mellor (Kitchener-Waterloo Granite)
- Greg Houston (Westmount)
- Steve Szymanski (Guelph)
- Ryan Sayer (Kitchener-Waterloo Granite)
- Scott McLean (Westmount)

=== Zone 13 ===
December 20-22, St. Catharines Curling Club (St. Catharines)

Teams:

- **Rick Thurston** (Dundas Granite)
- Todd Maslin (Dundas Granite)
- Bill Mackay (Dundas Valley)
- Matt Wilkinson (Glanford)
- Drew Macklin (Glendale)
- Joe Lococo (Niagara Falls)
- Shane McCready (St. Catharines Golf)
- Daniel Frans (St. Catharines Golf)
- Mike Rowe (Burlington)
- **Todd Brandwood** (Glendale)
- Pat Ferris (Grimsby)
- Simon Ouellet (Grimsby)
- Kris Blonski (Dundas Valley)
- Garth Mitchell (St. Catharines)

=== Zone 14 ===
December 5-7, Teeswater Curling Club (Teeswater)

Teams:

- Michael Schumacher (Teeswater)
- Mike Niesen (Walkerton)
- **Jake Higgs** (Harriston)
- **Steve Rathwell** (Listowel)

=== Zone 15 ===
December 19-21, Stratford Country Club (Stratford)

Teams:

- Chad Allen (Brant)
- Aaron Ward (Simcoe)
- Ken Patterson (Tillsonburg)
- **Wayne Tuck, Jr.** (Woodstock)
- Gareth Parry (Brant)
- **Mark Futcher** (St. Thomas)

=== Zone 16 ===
December 5-7, Forest Curling & Social Club (Forest)

Teams:

- Jerry Ferster (Chatham)
- Phil Daniel (Chatham)
- Shawn Hartle (Forest)
- **Kirk Ziola** (Highland)
- **Ean MacDonald** (London)
- Bob Ingram (Ridgetown)
- Al Beaucage (Sarnia)
- Peter Steski (Sarnia)
- Robert Stafford (Chatham)
- Jeff Young (Heritage Heights)
- Mike McLean (Ilderton)
- Perry Smyth (Sydenham)

== Regions ==
All on January 3-4 weekend

=== Region 1 (Zones 1-4) ===
Carleton Heights Curling Club, Ottawa

A Side
1A	Dave Murphy (Glengarry)
2B	Gary Rowe (Rideau)
3A	Chris Gardner (Arnprior)
4B	Ryan Ward (Quinte)
2A	Bryan Cochrane (Rideau)
1B	Matthew Paul (Ottawa)
4A	Greg Balsdon (Loonie)
3B	Doug Johnston (Arnprior)

Semifinals
Gary Rowe
Chris Gardner
Bryan Cochrane
Greg Balsdon

Finals
Chris Gardner
Bryan Cochrane

B Side
Dave Murphy
Ryan Ward
Matthew Paul
Doug Johnston

Quarterfinal
Dave Murphy
Greg Balsdon
Doug Johnston
Garry Rowe

Semifinal
Greg Balsdon
Garry Rowe
Final
Greg Balsdon
Bryan Cochrane

=== Region 2 (Zones 5-8) ===
St. George's Golf & Country Club, Etobicoke, Toronto

A Side
5A	Mark Bice (Peterborough)
6B	Greg Timbers (Uxbridge)
7A	Darryl Prebble (Scarboro)
8B	Bill Duck (St. George's)
6A	Rob Lobel (Whitby)
5B	John Collins (Peterborough)
8A	Wayne Middaugh (St. George's)
7B	Mike Harris (Donalda)

Semifinals
Mark Bice
Bill Duck
Rob Lobel
Wayne Middaugh

Finals
Mark Bice
Rob Lobel

B Side
Greg Timbers
Darryl Prebble
John Collins
Mike Harris

Quarterfinal
Darryl Prebble
Wayne Middaugh
Mike Harris
Bill Duck

Semifinal
Darryl Prebble
Mike Harris
Final
Mike Harris
Mark Bice

=== Region 3 (Zones 9-12) ===
Elmira & District Curling Club, Elmira

A Side
9A	Peter Corner (Brampton)
10B	Glenn Howard (Coldwater)
11A	Al Hutchinson (Blue Water)
12B	Mike Anderson (KW Granite)
10A	Dale Matchett (Churchill)
9B	Alex Foster (North Halton)
12A	Daryl Shane (KW Granite)
11B	Al Corbeil (Collingwood)

Semifinals
Glenn Howard
Mike Anderson
Dale Matchett
Daryl Shane

Finals
Glenn Howard
Daryl Shane

B Side
Peter Corner
Al Hutchinson
Alex Foster
Al Corbeil

Quarterfinal
Peter Corner
Dale Matchett
Alex Foster
Mike Anderson

Semifinal
Peter Corner
Alex Foster
Final
Peter Corner
Daryl Shane

=== Region 4 (Zones 11-16) ===
Sarnia Golf & Curling Club, Sarnia

A Side
13A	Todd Brandwood (Glendale)
14B	Steve Rathwell (Listowel)
15A	Wayne Tuck (Woodstock)
16B	Ean MacDonald (London)
14A	Jake Higgs (Harriston)
13B	Rick Thurston (Dundas Granite)
16A	Kirk Ziola (Highland)
15B	Mark Futcher (St. Thomas)

Semifinals
Todd Brandwood
Wayne Tuck
Jake Higgs
Kirk Ziola

Finals
Todd Brandwood
Jake Higgs

B Side
Steve Rathwell
Ean MacDonald
Rick Thurston
Mark Futcher

Quarterfinal
Ean MacDonald
Kirk Ziola
Rick Thurston
Wayne Tuck

Semifinal
Kirk Ziola
Rick Thurston
Final
Rick Thurston
Todd Brandwood

== Challenge Round ==
Challenge rounds will be held January 16-19 at the Trenton Curling Club in Trenton and the Grey Granite Club in Owen Sound to determine the last two spots. Both rounds are double knock-out

=== East Challenge Round ===
A Side
Gilles Allaire
Jim Wilson
Robert Dickson
Willie Jeffries
Gary Rowe
Joe Frans
Doug Johnston
Bryce Rowe

Quarterfinals
Greg Balsdon
Gilles Allaire
Willie Jeffries
Howard Rajala
Daryl Prebble
Joe Frans
Bryce Rowe
Mark Bice

Semifinals
Gilles Allaire
Willie Jeffries
Joe Frans
Mark Bice

Finals
Gilles Allaire
Mark Bice

B Side
Gary Rowe
Greg Balsdon
Doug Johnston
Howard Rajala
Jim Wilson
Darryl Prebble
Eobert Dickson
Bryce Rowe

Quarterfinals
Gary Rowe
Howard Rajala
Jim Wilson
Bryce Rowe

Quarter-final
Joe Frans
Gary Rowe
Willie Jeffries
Jim Wilson

Semi-final
Joe Frans
Jim Wilson

B final	A-B game #1	A-B game #2
Gilles Allaire
Joe Frans	Mark Bice
	Joe Frans
		Joe Frans
		Mark Bice

== See also ==
- 2009 Ontario Scotties Tournament of Hearts
