= Chris Gardner (curler) =

Canadian curler

- Curler
- Born: March 25, 1985 (age 41); Ottawa, Ontario, Canada

Team
- Curling club: Ottawa CC, Ottawa, ON
- Skip: Chris Gardner
- Third: Brian Vance
- Second: Keith Couthard
- Lead: Nick Catizone

Curling career
- Member Association: Ontario
- Top CTRS ranking: 14th (2013–14)

Christopher James Gardner (born March 25, 1985, in Ottawa) is a Canadian curler who competes mainly in Ontario.

== Career ==
Gardner skipped his bantam mixed team to a provincial championship in 2002, and the following year he won the provincial junior mixed title.

Gardner's men's team, which he skips, has had some success on the provincial curling tour circuit. In 2009, they made their first provincial championship, finishing with a 3–6 record. He played in his second provincial championship in 2010, finishing in last with a 1–9 record.

In April 2010, Gardner won the 2011 provincial mixed championship as skip, earning him the right to play in the 2011 Canadian Mixed Curling Championship with Erin Morrissey at third, Brad Kidd at second and Kim Brown at lead. The team finished fourth, with a 7–4 record, losing in a tie breaker to Manitoba.

In January 2012, Gardner won the Ontario Curling Association's Men's Challenge Round which gave them the right to curl at the 2012 Dominion Tankard in February. The team defeated Brian Lewis's squad 7-3 to win A side and complete a perfect 5-0 week. Team Gardner consisted of Chris Gardner (skip), Mathew Camm (vice), Brad Kidd (second), and Doug Johnson (lead) for the tournament since lead Simon Barrick was forced to drop out of the tournament days before due to illness.

In April 2014, Gardner won the Ontario provincial mixed championship again, defeating Mike McLean in the final who would become his teammate the following men's season. At the 2015 Canadian mixed championship, he finished the preliminary round robin 6-0 atop the standings, completing the round robin portion at 8-2 and wound up facing Jamie Koe from Northwest Territories in the semi-final where he lost 7–3. He defeated British Columbia 9–2 in the bronze medal game to capture third place.
