= Rob Lobel =

Canadian curler (born 1966)

- Curler
- Born: June 2, 1966 (age 60); Montreal, Quebec

Team
- Curling club: The Thornhill Club, Thornhill, ON
- Skip: Rob Lobel
- Third: Steven Lobel
- Second: Steven Oldford
- Lead: Wyllie Allan

Curling career
- Member Association: Ontario

Rob Lobel (born June 2, 1966 in Montreal, Quebec) is a Canadian curler from Thornhill, Ontario. He currently skips his own team.

== Career ==
Lobel played second for Steve Hartley at the 1984 Junior Provincial Curling Championship, in which the team won, earning them the right to represent Ontario at the 1984 Canadian Junior Men's Curling Championship. The team was coached by his father Art. There, team finished with a 7–4 record, in fourth place.

In his first men's provincial championship, Lobel skipped his men's team to a fourth-place finish at the 2008 provincial championship, losing to Mike Harris in the 3-4 game. The following season, his team made it to the 2009 TSC Stores Tankard and placed sixth with a 4-5 record. He finished 4–6 at the 2010 Ontario Men's Curling Championship and 3–7 in 2014, his last Tankard appearance.

Lobel won a provincial senior mixed championship in 2017.

== Personal life ==
Lobel's brother Steven is a member of his team. Their father Art is a five time Quebec provincial champion, and was a member of the 1977 Macdonald Brier championship team.
