= Nick Rizzo (curler) =

Canadian curler

- Curler
- Born: July 24, 1961 (age 65)

Curling career
- Member Association: Ontario

Nick Rizzo (born July 24, 1961) is a Canadian curler from Brantford, Ontario. He was active on the World Curling Tour until 2015. He is a former provincial junior and mixed champion.

In 1979, his rink of Dan Aitchison, Brad Hager and Chris Hager won the provincial junior championship, finishing the event in first place with a 6–1 round robin record. The team represented Ontario at the 1979 Canadian Junior Curling Championships, finishing with a 4–7 record, tied for eighth. In 1988, he won a provincial Colts championship and in April 2002, he won the 2003 Ontario Mixed Championship with his wife Jo-Ann and teammates Gareth Parry and Vicki Advent, defeating the Peter Mellor rink in the final. This qualified the team to represent Ontario at the 2003 Canadian Mixed Curling Championship. At the Canadian Mixed, they made the playoffs, where they lost in the 3 vs. 4 game to Alberta's Shannon Kleibrink.

Rizzo played in his lone Grand Slam of Curling event at the 2004 BDO Curling Classic. Rizzo, and his rink of John Epping, Scott Foster and Rob Brockbank did not make the playoffs, being eliminated by Scotland's Tom Brewster after defeating 2006 Olympic champion Brad Gushue.

Rizzo has played in ten Ontario men's championships in his career, his last provincial championship being in 2011.
