= Joe Frans (curler) =

Canadian curler from Guelph, Ontario

- Curler
- Born: July 1, 1975 (age 51); Grimsby, Ontario

Team
- Curling club: Oakville CC, Oakville, ON

Curling career
- Member Association: Ontario
- Brier: 2 (2002, 2005)
- Top CTRS ranking: 2nd (2003–04)
Medal record
Tim Hortons Brier
Silver medal – second place	2002 Calgary

Joseph Mark Frans (born July 1, 1975 in Grimsby, Ontario) is a Canadian curler from Guelph, Ontario. Frans is most notable for being a two-time provincial champion and for being suspended from competitive curling for cocaine usage.

== Career ==
Frans obtained fame as a curler in 1991, when he won the provincial school boys championship and the provincial junior mixed championship while curling in Smiths Falls, Ontario. In 1993, Frans won the provincial junior championship while playing in St. Catharines, Ontario. At the 1993 Canadian Junior Curling Championships, his team would finish with a 6-5 record. In 1994, while a grade 13 student at St. Catharines' Merritton High School, Frans would win a second straight provincial championship, this time with a rink from Bradford, Ontario. At the 1994 Canadian Junior Curling Championships, he skipped the Ontario team to a 4th place finish (7-4 record), just out of the playoffs.

Frans later joined up with another provincial junior champion, John Morris, playing as his vice. The team played in the 2001 Canadian Olympic Curling Trials, finishing with a 5-4 record. The following year, they won a provincial men's championship. At the 2002 Nokia Brier, the team lost in the final to Randy Ferbey's Alberta rink. The following year, the team lost to Ferbey once again in the Canada Cup final. Morris left Ontario following that season, and Frans joined up with Wayne Middaugh, playing as his second. The team won the 2005 provincial championship, qualifying them for the 2005 Tim Hortons Brier. It was at the 2005 Brier, that Frans was randomly selected to have his urine tested. After the Brier, it was announced that Frans had tested positive for cocaine, which Frans denies using. Nonetheless, Frans was banned from competitive curling for two years. It was the first positive drug test in curling history. At the 2005 Brier, the team finished with a 6-5 record. Frans curled 81%, fourth among seconds.

Frans would return in 2007, skipping his own team. The 2007 John Shea Insurance Canada Cup Qualifier being one of his first major events.

In 2009, Frans qualified for the 2009 provincial championship, where he and his rink lost in the semi-final to Peter Corner. He qualified again in 2010 and finished with a 6-4 record. In 2011, he joined the Corner rink and played second.

For the 2012–13 curling season, Frans returned to skipping. He replaced Dale Matchett, who skipped the team of Ryan Werenich (son of the legendary Ed Werenich), Jeff Gorda and Shawn Kaufman since the fall of 2005. Matchett retired from competitive play.
