= Rick Thurston =

Canadian curler

- Curler

Team
- Curling club: Dundas Granite CC, Dundas, ON

Curling career
- Member Association: Ontario
- Brier: 0

Rick Thurston is a Canadian curler from Waterdown, Ontario.

He and his team won the 2008 Ontario men's provincial Intermediate Championship (curlers over 40 years old).

Thurston's team also qualified for their first provincial championship in 2009, the 2009 TSC Stores Tankard. They finished with an 0-9 record, in last place.

Thurston won the provincial senior mixed championship in 2013, 2015 and 2022.

He won the provincial "stick" championship in 2022, for curlers who use a stick delivery, rather than throwing the rock. In 2024, he won the provincial two-person stick championship.
