= Daryl Shane =

Canadian curler

- Curler

Team
- Curling club: Listowel CC, Listowel
- Skip: Daryl Shane
- Third: Don Shane
- Second: Bruce Cox
- Lead: Jackson Cox

Curling career
- Member Association: Ontario
- Brier: 0
- Grand Slam victories: 0

Daryl Shane is a Canadian curler from Waterloo, Ontario. He is a former provincial junior champion. He presently skips a men's team on the Ontario Curling Tour, and has played on the World Curling Tour in past seasons.

Shane attended John Diefenbaker Secondary School in Hanover, Ontario where he skipped his rink of Terry McCannell, Brad Lantz and Gary Deeves to the 1978 provincial junior men's (schoolboy) curling championship.

Shane has played in four provincial men's championships, the most recent two being in 2008 and in 2012.
