= 2011 The Dominion Tankard =

Curling championship in Canada

The Dominion Tankard 2011
- Host city: Grimsby, Ontario
- Arena: Peach King Centre
- Dates: February 7–13
- Winner: Glenn Howard
- Curling club: Coldwater and District Curling Club
- Skip: Glenn Howard
- Third: Richard Hart
- Second: Brent Laing
- Lead: Craig Savill
- Finalist: Greg Balsdon

The 2011 Dominion Tankard, southern Ontario men's provincial curling championship was held February 7–13 at the Peach King Centre in Grimsby, Ontario. The winning team of Glenn Howard will represent Ontario at the 2011 Tim Hortons Brier in London, Ontario.

== Teams ==
Skip	Third	Second	Lead	Club(s)
Glenn Howard	Richard Hart	Brent Laing	Craig Savill	Coldwater and District Curling Club, Coldwater
Greg Balsdon	Chris Ciasnocha	Tyler Morgan	Jamie Farnell	Loonie Curling Club, Rideau Lakes
Chris Gardner	Don Bowser	Brad Kidd	Simon Barrick	Renfrew Curling Club, Renfrew
John Epping	Scott Bailey	Darryl Prebble	Trevor Wall	Donalda Curling Club, Don Mills, Toronto
Mark Kean	Chris Van Huyse	Patrick Janssen	Tim March	Annandale County Club, Ajax
Peter Corner	Graeme McCarrel	Phil Loevenmark	Paul Madgett	Brampton Curling Club, Brampton
Dale Matchett	Ryan Werenich	Jeff Gorda	Shawn Kaufman	Bradford and District Curling Club, Bradford
Mark Bice	Codey Maus	Steve Bice	John Grant	Sarnia Golf and Curling Club, Sarnia
Nick Rizzo	Chad Allen	Jay Allen	Chad Simpson	Brantford Golf and Country Club, Brantford
Howard Rajala	J. P. Lachance	Jeff Henderson	Craig Codiner	Rideau Curling Club, Ottawa
Brent Ross	Jake Higgs (skip)	Andrew Clayton	Bill Buchanan	Harriston Curling Club, Harriston

== Standings ==
Skip (Club)	W	L	PF	PA	Ends Won	Ends Lost	Blank Ends	Stolen Ends
Peter Corner (Brampton)	8	2	69	54	41	36	8	11
Glenn Howard (Coldwater)	8	2	79	35	40	22	8	11
Greg Balsdon (Loonie)	7	3	80	57	46	37	5	12
John Epping (Donalda)	7	3	76	64	43	41	5	10
Mark Bice (Sarnia)	6	4	70	76	45	44	8	7
Chris Gardner (Renfrew)	5	5	73	72	47	41	7	16
Dale Matchett (Bradford)	4	6	57	75	35	42	7	7
Mark Kean (Annandale)	3	7	53	67	43	35	12	8
Howard Rajala (Rideau)	3	7	67	71	43	48	5	9
Nick Rizzo (Brantford)	3	7	56	74	35	42	4	5
Jake Higgs (Harriston)	1	9	41	78	30	45	7	8

== Round robin ==
- All times EST

=== Draw 1 ===
February 7, 2:00pm

Sheet A	1	2	3	4	5	6	7	8	9	10	Final
Bice	0	0	0	1	0	0	0	X	X	X	1
Howard 🔨	3	0	0	0	3	0	2	X	X	X	8

Sheet B	1	2	3	4	5	6	7	8	9	10	Final
Higgs	0	0	0	0	2	0	1	0	2	0	5
Matchett 🔨	0	0	2	1	0	1	0	1	0	1	6

Sheet C	1	2	3	4	5	6	7	8	9	10	Final
Rajala 🔨	2	0	1	1	0	0	2	1	X	X	7
Rizzo	0	1	0	0	1	0	0	0	X	X	2

Sheet D	1	2	3	4	5	6	7	8	9	10	Final
Balsdon 🔨	0	0	1	1	0	0	3	0	4	X	9
Gardner	1	1	0	0	2	1	0	1	0	X	6

Sheet E	1	2	3	4	5	6	7	8	9	10	Final
Kean	0	0	0	0	1	0	0	X	X	X	1
Corner 🔨	2	3	0	1	0	1	0	X	X	X	7

=== Draw 2 ===
February 7, 7:30pm

Sheet A	1	2	3	4	5	6	7	8	9	10	Final
Rizzo 🔨	1	2	0	2	0	0	0	0	X	X	5
Gardner	0	0	2	0	0	2	2	6	X	X	12

Sheet B	1	2	3	4	5	6	7	8	9	10	Final
Kean 🔨	3	0	1	1	1	0	2	0	X	X	8
Higgs	0	0	0	0	0	3	0	1	X	X	4

Sheet C	1	2	3	4	5	6	7	8	9	10	Final
Howard	0	1	0	0	2	1	0	1	0	X	5
Corner 🔨	2	0	0	4	0	0	2	0	1	X	9

Sheet D	1	2	3	4	5	6	7	8	9	10	Final
Bice	1	0	0	2	0	1	0	3	1	1	9
Epping 🔨	0	0	2	0	3	0	2	0	0	0	7

Sheet E	1	2	3	4	5	6	7	8	9	10	Final
Rajala	0	0	0	0	2	0	0	0	2	1	5
Matchett 🔨	2	0	2	0	0	1	1	0	0	0	6

=== Draw 3 ===
February 8, 2:00pm

Sheet A	1	2	3	4	5	6	7	8	9	10	Final
Corner 🔨	1	0	0	1	0	X	X	X	X	X	2
Epping	0	3	1	0	4	X	X	X	X	X	8

Sheet B	1	2	3	4	5	6	7	8	9	10	Final
Rajala	0	0	1	0	1	0	0	3	0	0	5
Kean🔨	1	1	0	2	0	2	0	0	2	1	9

Sheet C	1	2	3	4	5	6	7	8	9	10	Final
Gardner 🔨	3	0	1	0	2	0	1	0	2	3	12
Matchett	0	1	0	2	0	1	0	3	0	0	7

Sheet D	1	2	3	4	5	6	7	8	9	10	Final
Rizzo	0	1	0	1	0	3	0	0	0	X	5
Balsdon 🔨	1	0	2	0	2	0	2	1	1	X	9

Sheet E	1	2	3	4	5	6	7	8	9	10	Final
Howard 🔨	4	0	7	X	X	X	X	X	X	X	11
Higgs	0	2	0	X	X	X	X	X	X	X	2

=== Draw 4 ===
February 8, 7:00pm

Sheet A	1	2	3	4	5	6	7	8	9	10	Final
Matchett	0	2	0	0	0	2	0	0	2	0	6
Balsdon 🔨	1	0	0	3	1	0	1	1	0	3	10

Sheet B	1	2	3	4	5	6	7	8	9	10	Final
Howard 🔨	3	1	1	0	1	1	X	X	X	X	7
Rajala	0	0	0	1	0	0	X	X	X	X	1

Sheet C	1	2	3	4	5	6	7	8	9	10	Final
Epping 🔨	2	0	2	0	0	0	1	1	3	X	9
Higgs	0	1	0	1	0	1	0	0	0	X	3

Sheet D	1	2	3	4	5	6	7	8	9	10	Final
Corner	0	0	0	3	0	1	1	0	3	X	8
Bice 🔨	0	2	1	0	1	0	0	1	0	X	5

Sheet E	1	2	3	4	5	6	7	8	9	10	Final
Gardner	0	0	1	0	1	1	0	0	0	2	5
Kean 🔨	2	1	0	1	0	0	0	0	0	0	4

=== Draw 5 ===
February 9, 9:00am

Sheet A	1	2	3	4	5	6	7	8	9	10	Final
Higgs	0	0	1	1	0	2	1	0	1	1	7
Bice 🔨	3	2	0	0	2	0	0	1	0	0	8

Sheet B	1	2	3	4	5	6	7	8	9	10	Final
Gardner	0	0	1	0	0	0	0	X	X	X	1
Howard 🔨	3	1	0	0	1	0	2	X	X	X	7

Sheet C	1	2	3	4	5	6	7	8	9	10	Final
Balsdon	0	1	0	1	0	1	0	0	2	0	5
Kean 🔨	2	0	2	0	1	0	0	2	0	1	8

Sheet D	1	2	3	4	5	6	7	8	9	10	Final
Matchett 🔨	1	0	1	6	0	X	X	X	X	X	8
Rizzo	0	1	0	0	1	X	X	X	X	X	6

Sheet E	1	2	3	4	5	6	7	8	9	10	Final
Epping 🔨	0	2	0	1	0	1	0	1	0	0	5
Rajala	1	0	1	0	1	0	2	0	2	3	10

=== Draw 6 ===
February 9, 2:00pm

Sheet A	1	2	3	4	5	6	7	8	9	10	Final
Kean	0	2	0	2	0	1	0	0	0	X	5
Rizzo 🔨	2	0	1	0	3	0	0	1	2	X	9

Sheet B	1	2	3	4	5	6	7	8	9	10	Final
Epping 🔨	4	0	0	0	2	0	2	0	1	1	10
Gardner	0	2	1	1	0	2	0	1	0	0	7

Sheet C	1	2	3	4	5	6	7	8	9	10	11	Final
Bice 🔨	2	0	1	0	0	2	0	2	0	2	1	10
Rajala	0	4	0	1	1	0	1	0	2	0	0	9

Sheet D	1	2	3	4	5	6	7	8	9	10	Final
Higgs 🔨	0	0	0	0	1	0	1	0	0	X	2
Corner	0	0	1	1	0	1	0	1	1	X	5

Sheet E	1	2	3	4	5	6	7	8	9	10	Final
Balsdon	0	3	0	0	1	0	1	0	2	0	7
Howard 🔨	2	0	1	1	0	2	0	2	0	1	9

=== Draw 7 ===
February 9, 7:00pm

Sheet A	1	2	3	4	5	6	7	8	9	10	Final
Rajala	0	1	0	2	0	3	0	1	1	0	8
Corner 🔨	2	0	1	0	4	0	3	0	0	1	11

Sheet B	1	2	3	4	5	6	7	8	9	10	Final
Balsdon 🔨	6	0	0	3	0	2	X	X	X	X	11
Epping	0	4	1	0	1	0	X	X	X	X	6

Sheet C	1	2	3	4	5	6	7	8	9	10	Final
Rizzo	0	0	3	0	1	0	0	X	X	X	4
Howard 🔨	3	1	0	3	0	2	1	X	X	X	10

Sheet D	1	2	3	4	5	6	7	8	9	10	Final
Kean 🔨	0	1	0	0	1	0	0	X	X	X	2
Matchett	1	0	2	1	0	2	1	X	X	X	7

Sheet E	1	2	3	4	5	6	7	8	9	10	11	Final
Bice 🔨	2	0	1	0	0	2	0	0	4	0	1	10
Gardner	0	1	0	2	2	0	1	1	0	2	0	9

=== Draw 8 ===
February 10, 2:00pm

Sheet A	1	2	3	4	5	6	7	8	9	10	Final
Howard 🔨	2	1	0	6	X	X	X	X	X	X	9
Matchett	0	0	2	0	X	X	X	X	X	X	2

Sheet B	1	2	3	4	5	6	7	8	9	10	Final
Bice	0	0	0	1	0	1	0	1	0	X	3
Balsdon 🔨	0	0	2	0	1	0	2	0	1	X	6

Sheet C	1	2	3	4	5	6	7	8	9	10	11	Final
Corner	0	0	2	1	2	0	0	1	1	0	1	8
Gardner 🔨	3	1	0	0	0	0	1	0	0	2	0	7

Sheet D	1	2	3	4	5	6	7	8	9	10	Final
Rajala 🔨	1	1	0	1	1	0	1	1	0	0	6
Higgs	0	0	1	0	0	2	0	0	2	2	7

Sheet E	1	2	3	4	5	6	7	8	9	10	Final
Rizzo 🔨	1	0	1	1	0	1	0	0	0	1	5
Epping	0	1	0	0	1	0	1	1	2	0	6

=== Draw 9 ===
February 10, 7:00pm

Sheet A	1	2	3	4	5	6	7	8	9	10	Final
Gardner	1	0	2	1	0	1	0	1	0	1	7
Higgs 🔨	0	1	0	0	2	0	2	0	1	0	6

Sheet B	1	2	3	4	5	6	7	8	9	10	Final
Rizzo	0	2	0	1	1	0	3	0	1	0	8
Bice 🔨	2	0	1	0	0	2	0	1	0	1	7

Sheet C	1	2	3	4	5	6	7	8	9	10	Final
Matchett	0	0	2	0	0	2	0	0	X	X	4
Epping 🔨	2	0	0	1	4	0	2	2	X	X	11

Sheet D	1	2	3	4	5	6	7	8	9	10	Final
Howard 🔨	2	1	0	0	0	2	3	X	X	X	8
Kean	0	0	1	1	0	0	0	X	X	X	2

Sheet E	1	2	3	4	5	6	7	8	9	10	Final
Corner	0	0	0	0	0	0	0	X	X	X	0
Balsdon 🔨	0	1	1	1	2	1	2	X	X	X	8

=== Draw 10 ===
February 11, 2:00pm

Sheet A	1	2	3	4	5	6	7	8	9	10	11	Final
Epping	0	2	0	2	0	0	1	0	2	0	1	8
Kean 🔨	1	0	1	0	0	1	0	1	0	3	0	7

Sheet B	1	2	3	4	5	6	7	8	9	10	Final
Corner	0	1	0	2	1	0	0	3	0	1	8
Rizzo 🔨	1	0	1	0	0	3	0	0	1	0	6

Sheet C	1	2	3	4	5	6	7	8	9	10	Final
Higgs 🔨	1	0	0	0	1	1	0	1	0	X	4
Balsdon	0	1	1	1	0	0	3	0	3	X	9

Sheet D	1	2	3	4	5	6	7	8	9	10	Final
Gardner	0	2	1	0	1	0	1	0	2	1	8
Rajala 🔨	1	0	0	2	0	1	0	2	0	0	6

Sheet E	1	2	3	4	5	6	7	8	9	10	Final
Matchett 🔨	0	1	0	1	0	3	0	0	2	0	7
Bice	1	0	1	0	1	0	2	1	0	2	8

=== Draw 11 ===
February 11, 7:00pm

Sheet A	1	2	3	4	5	6	7	8	9	10	Final
Balsdon	0	1	0	3	0	1	0	1	0	X	6
Rajala 🔨	3	0	1	0	2	0	3	0	1	X	10

Sheet B	1	2	3	4	5	6	7	8	9	10	Final
Matchett	0	0	1	0	2	0	0	1	0	X	4
Corner 🔨	1	1	0	1	0	3	1	0	4	X	11

Sheet C	1	2	3	4	5	6	7	8	9	10	Final
Kean	0	0	3	1	0	1	0	2	0	0	7
Bice 🔨	0	2	0	0	2	0	2	0	2	1	9

Sheet D	1	2	3	4	5	6	7	8	9	10	Final
Epping	0	1	0	1	0	2	1	0	0	1	6
Howard 🔨	1	0	1	0	1	0	0	0	2	0	5

Sheet E	1	2	3	4	5	6	7	8	9	10	Final
Higgs	0	0	0	0	2	0	X	X	X	X	2
Rizzo 🔨	2	2	0	3	0	3	X	X	X	X	10

== Playoffs ==
Page playoff system
RD1-seed2 2

Semifinal

Final

=== 1 vs. 2 ===
February 12, 2:00 PM ET

Sheet D	1	2	3	4	5	6	7	8	9	10	Final
Corner 🔨	1	0	0	1	0	2	0	1	0	X	5
Howard	0	2	0	0	4	0	2	0	3	X	11

=== 3 vs. 4 ===
February 12, 7:00 PM ET

Sheet D	1	2	3	4	5	6	7	8	9	10	Final
Epping	0	1	0	0	1	0	2	0	X	X	4
Balsdon 🔨	1	0	3	3	0	2	0	1	X	X	10

=== Semifinal ===
February 13, 9:30 AM ET

Sheet D	1	2	3	4	5	6	7	8	9	10	Final
Corner 🔨	0	1	0	1	0	1	0	1	0	X	4
Balsdon	1	0	0	0	2	0	2	0	4	X	9

=== Final ===
February 13, 2:00 PM ET

Sheet D	1	2	3	4	5	6	7	8	9	10	Final
Howard 🔨	3	0	1	0	4	1	0	1	X	X	10
Balsdon	0	1	0	1	0	0	1	0	X	X	3

== Qualification ==
=== Zone 1 ===
December 11–12, Brockville Country Club

- Kevin Baker (Cornwall)
- Charles Wert (Cornwall)
- Ian MacAulay (Ottawa)
- Matt Paul (Ottawa)
- Gary Rowe (Ottawa)
- Jeff McCrady (Ottawa)
- Shane Latimer (Ottawa)
- Ron Hrycak (Ottawa)

=== Zone 2 ===
December 11–12, Brockville Country Club

- Steve Lodge (Brockville)
- Greg Richardson (Rideau)
- Bryan Cochrane (Rideau)
- Howard Rajala (Rideau)
- Bill Blad (Rideau)
- Blair Dawes (Rideau)
- Frank O'Driscoll (Rideau)

=== Zone 3 ===
December 10–12, Renfrew Curling Club

- Dennis Elgie (City View)
- Josh Adams (Granite)
- Steve Allen (Renfrew)
- Damien Villard (Renfrew)
- Chris Gardner (Renfrew)

=== Zone 4 ===
December 10–12, Trenton Curling Club

- Scott Davey (Cataraqui)
- Jim Marshall (Land O'Lakes)
- Greg Balsdon (Loonie)
- Rob Dickson (Napanee)
- Paul Dickson (Napanee)
- Joe Tuer (Quinte)
- Dennis Murray (Quinte)
- Paul Wood (Royal Kingston)
- Bryce Rowe (Land O'Lakes)
- David Collyer (Royal Kingston)

=== Zone 5 ===
December 10–12, Bancroft Curling Club

- Nick Avlontis (Lakefield)
- Mike Moloney (Lakefield)
- Jim O'Marra (Peterborough)
- Jason Hogan (Peterborough)
- Jon St. Denis (Peterborough)
- Bill Harrison (Woodville)
- Mike McLean (Peterborough)

=== Zone 6 ===
December 11–13, Tam Heather Tennis & Curling Club, Scarborough

- Mark Kean (Annandale)
- Nathan Martin (Oshawa)
- Ian Gibson (Oshawa Golf)
- Wayne Warren (Tam Heather)
- Tim Morrison (Unionville)
- Scott McPherson (Unionville)
- Bruce Jefferson (Uxbridge)
- Gary Grant (Uxbridge)
- Rob Lobel (Whitby)
- Jason March (Whitby)
- John Bell (Unionville)

=== Zone 7 ===
December 11–12, Bayview Golf & Country Club, Thornhill

- John Epping (Donalda)
- Aidan Ritchie (East York)
- Michael Shepherd (East York)
- Dennis Moretto (Richmond Hill)
- Peter Matthews (Richmond Hill)
- Dave Coutanche (Richmond Hill)
- Mike Anderson (Thornhill)
- Duane Lindner (York)
- Jordan Keon (Richmond Hill)
- Gregg Truscott (Scarboro)

=== Zone 8 ===
December 11–15, Weston Golf & Country Club

- Jonathan Braden (High Park)
- Roy Arndt (High Park)
- Mike Harris (Oakville)
- Guy Racette (Royal Canadian)
- Ian Fleming (Royal Canadian)
- Josh Johnston (Royal Canadian)
- Wayne Middaugh (St. George's)
- Bill Duck (St. George's)

=== Zone 9 ===
December 10–12, Alliston Curling Club

- Willy MacPherson (Alliston)
- Peter Corner (Brampton)
- Andrew McGaugh (Brampton)
- Rayad Husain (Chinguacousy)
- Rob Lipsett (Markdale)
- Steve Oldford (Milton)
- Dayna Deruelle (Brampton)

=== Zone 10 ===
December 11–12, Stroud Curling Club

- Ken Leach (Barrie)
- Cory Heggestad (Barrie)
- Travis Dafoe (Bradford)
- Dale Matchett (Bradford)
- Darcy Weeks (Parry Sound)
- Andrew Thompson (Stroud)
- Don Campbell (Orillia)

=== Zone 11 ===
December 11–12, Wiarton Curling Club

- Al Hutchinson (Blue Water)
- Alan Kemp (Collingwood)
- Murray Dougherty (Meaford)
- Joey Rettinger (Tara)

=== Zone 12 ===
December 11–12, Ayr Curling Club

- Darcy Perrin (Ayr)
- Andrew Fairfull (Guelph)
- Robert Rumfeldt (Guelph)
- Jared Collie (Kitchener-Waterloo Granite)
- Daryl Shane (Kitchener-Waterloo Granite)
- Peter Mellor (Kitchener-Waterloo Granite)
- Andrew Flemming (Westmount)
- Jamie DeHart (Westmount)

=== Zone 13 ===
December 10–12, Hamilton Victoria Club

- Steve Goodger (Dundas Granite)
- Ian Robertson (Dundas Valley)
- Todd Brandwood (Glendale)
- Bill Mackay (Grimsby)
- Jason Stahl (Hamilton Victoria)
- Simon Ouellet (St. Catharines)
- Matt Wilkinson (St. Catharines Golf)
- Shane McCready (St. Catharines Golf)
- Jason Murray (Burlington)
- Steve Henderson (Dundas Granite)
- Garth Mitchell (Grimsby)
- Curtis Muir (St. Catharines Golf)
- Mike Rowe (Burlington)
- Geoff Scott (Burlington Golf)

=== Zone 14 ===
December 10–12, Vanastra Curling Club

- Jake Higgs (Harriston)
- Mike Schumacher (Teeswater)
- Scott McGregor (Wingham)

=== Zone 15 ===
December 10–12, Tillsonburg & District Curling Club

- Jake Walker (Aylmer)
- Terry Corbin (Brant)
- Travis Fanset (Tillsonburg)
- Wayne Tuck Jr. (Woodstock)
- Nick Rizzo (Brantford)

=== Zone 16 ===
December 10–12, Ilderton Curling Club

- Perry Smyth (Chatham Granite)
- Mark Bice (Sarnia)
- Evan Lilly (Highland)
- Bob Armstrong (Ilderton)
- Bob Stafford (Chatham Granite)
- Dale Kelly (Sarnia)

== Regions ==
All on January 8–9 weekend

=== Region 1 (Zones 1-4) ===
Cornwall Curling Centre, Cornwall

A Side
1A	Latimer	6
4B	Collyer	3
2A	Cochrane	4
3B	Gardner	8
4A	Balsdon	7
1B	Hrycak	1
3A	Allen	5
2B	Rajala	9

Semifinals
Latimer	5
Gardner	8
Balsdon	8
Rajala	4

Finals
Gardner	4
Balsdon	6

B Side
Collyer	3
Cochrane	10
Hrycak	4
Allen	9

Quarterfinal
Rajala	6
Cochrane	4
Latimer	6
Allen	4

Semifinal
Rajala	5
Latimer	8
Final
Latimer	3
Gardner	4

=== Region 2 (Zones 5-8) ===
Uxbdirge and District Curling Club, Uxbridge

A Side
5A	St. Denis	7
8B	Harris	4
6A	Lobel	9
7B	Anderson	3
8A	Arndt	7
5B	McLean	9
7A	Epping	6
6B	Kean	5

Semifinals
St. Denis	7
Lobel	4
McLean	2
Epping	8

Finals
St. Denis	3
Epping	7

B Side
Harris	0
Anderson	7
Arndt	2
Kean	7

Quarterfinal
McLean	7
Anderson	5
Lobel	3
Kean	9

Semifinal
McLean	5
Kean	11
Final
Kean	7
St. Denis	4

=== Region 3 (Zones 9-12) ===
Bradford and District Curling Club, Bradford

A Side
9A	Corner	8
12B	Mellor	3
10A	Matchett	7
11B	Rettinger	4
12A	Fairfull	7
9B	Deruelle	4
11A	Hutchinson	9
10B	Heggestad	6

Semifinals
Corner	7
Matchett	2
Fairfull	9
Hutchinson	8

Finals
Corner	11
Fairfull	6

B Side
Mellor	8
Rettinger	2
Deruelle	1
Heggestad	7

Quarterfinal
Hutchinson	6
Mellor	9
Matchett	6
Heggestad	1

Semifinal
Mellor	3
Matchett	5
Final
Matchett	8
Fairfull	4

=== Region 4 (Zones 13-16) ===
Teeswater Curling Club, Teeswater

A Side
13A	Mitchell	8
16B	Kelly	7
14A	Higgs	6
15B	Fanset	10
16A	Bice	8
13B	Robertson	4
15A	Rizzo	7
14B	McGregor	6

Semifinals
Mitchell	4
Fanset	9
Bice	4
Rizzo	2

Finals
Fanset	6
Bice	7

B Side
Kelly	2
Higgs	8
Robertson	10
McGregor	4

Quarterfinal
Rizzo	6
Higgs	5
Mitchell	5
Robertson	13

Semifinal
Rizzo	8
Robertson	4
Final
Rizzo	7
Fanset	1

== Challenge Rounds ==
Both are January 21–24

=== East ===
Oshawa Curling Club

A Side
Harris	9
Rowe	6
Latimer	5
Villard	7
St. Denis	7
Warren	5
Anderson	5
Fleming	4
Richardson	7
Lodge	4

Quarterfinals
Lobel	6
Harris	7
Villard	3
St. Denis	8
Rajala	6
Anderson	4
Richardson	4
Middaugh	7

Semifinals
Harris	7
St. Denis	6
Rajala	7
Middaugh	6

A final
Harris	9
Rajala	10

B Side (Top half)
Latimer	6
Warren	4

Quarterfinals
Richardson	6
Rowe	4
Anderson	8
Latimer	5

Semifinals
Richardson	5
Anderson	6

to bottom half final
Anderson	5
St. Denis	9

B Side (bottom half)
Villard	3
Fleming	8
Lobel	8
Lodge	3

Quarterfinals
Fleming	3
Lobel	4

Semifinals
Lobel	1
Middaugh	8

to B final
St. Denis	3
Middaugh	7

B Final		A vs B (game 1)		A vs B (game 2, if nec.)
Middaugh	7
Harris	5	Rajala	7
		Middaugh	6
				Rajala
				Rajala

The B winner must beat the A winner twice in order to advance to the Tankard.

=== West ===
Shelburne Curling Club

A Side
Shane	8
Armstrong	7
Fanset	4
Deruelle	8

Quarterfinals
Mitchell	8
Robertson	7
Shane	6
Heggestad	10
Deruelle	3
Rumfeldt	8
Higgs	8
Tuck	2

Semifinals
Mitchell	8
Heggestad	3
Rumfeldt	4
Higgs	7

Finals
Mitchell	4
Higgs	7

B Side
Tuck	9
Armstrong	8
Fanset	2
Robertson	7

Quarterfinals
Deruelle	5
Tuck	9
Robertson	7
Shane	8

Semifinals
Tuck	5
Heggestad	8
Shane	3
Rumfeldt	6

to B final
Heggestad	7
Rumfeldt	8

B Final		A vs B (game 1)		A vs B (game 2, if nec.)
Mitchell	7
Rumfeldt	4	Mitchell	5
		Higgs	7
				Higgs
				Higgs

The B winner must beat the A winner twice in order to advance to the Tankard.
