= 2022 Canadian Curling Club Championships =

Canadian national curling championship edition

2022 Everest Canadian Curling Club Championships
- Host city: Edmonton, Alberta
- Arena: Ice Palace, West Edmonton Mall
- Dates: November 21–26
- Men's winner: Ontario
- Curling club: Richmond Hill CC, Richmond Hill
- Skip: Greg Balsdon
- Third: Jordan Keon
- Second: Curtis Samoy
- Lead: Trevor Talbott
- Finalist: Quebec (Buckingham CC)
- Women's winner: New Brunswick
- Curling club: Curl Moncton, Moncton
- Skip: Shaelyn Park
- Third: Krista Flanagan
- Second: Lynn LeBlanc
- Lead: Shannon Tatlock
- Finalist: Ontario (The Thornhill Club)

The 2022 Everest Canadian Curling Club Championships were held from November 21 to 26 at the Ice Palace at the West Edmonton Mall in Edmonton, Alberta. The event is the Canadian championship for "club-level" curling, that is for curlers who are not currently playing at the high performance level.

The event was originally supposed to begin on November 20 but was delayed a day due to an ice installation issue. This was the first curling event held at the West Edmonton Mall since the 1996 West Edmonton Mall Curling Classic, a World Curling Tour event that lasted two seasons.

The winning teams will participate in the 2023 PointsBet Invitational tournament.

== Men ==
=== Teams ===
The teams are listed as follows:

Team	Skip	Third	Second	Lead	Alternate	Club
Alberta	Robert Johnson	Lyle Kent	Steve Thomas	Nathan Relitz		Irricana CC, Irricana
British Columbia	Ron Schmidt	Norm Cote	Randy Baert	Mike Meeres		Comox Valley CC, Courtenay
Manitoba	Zachary Wasylik	Jack Hykaway	Joshua Harding	Graham Normand	Andrew Peck	Pembina CC, Winnipeg
New Brunswick	Jeff Lacey	Mitchell Downey	Peter Case	Nick Munn		Thistle-St. Andrews CC, Saint John
Newfoundland and Labrador	Rod Feltham	Scott Davidge	Kris MacLeod	Keith Clarke	Aaron Feltham	Gander CC, Gander
Northern Ontario	Ben Mikkelsen	Greg Doran	Mark Blanchard	Devin Doran	Chris Briand	Port Arthur CC, Thunder Bay
Northwest Territories	Jim Lockhart	Kevin Hawkshaw	Jeff Clubine	Jeff O'Keefe		Fort Smith C&WSC, Fort Smith
Nova Scotia	Greg Power	Tony Moore	Ryan MacIver	Jamie Turnbull		Halifax CC, Halifax
Nunavut	Wade Kingdon	Hunter Tootoo	Greg Howard	Terry Lichy		Iqaluit CC, Iqaluit
Ontario	Greg Balsdon	Jordan Keon	Curtis Samoy	Trevor Talbott		Richmond Hill CC, Richmond Hill
Prince Edward Island	Jamie Newson	Dennis Watts	Corey Miller	Terry Arsenault	Andrew MacDougall	Summerside CC, Summerside
Quebec	Jasmin Gibeau	Dan deWaard	Marc-Antoine Biron	Kévin Ménard		Buckingham CC, Buckingham
Saskatchewan	Cole Tenetuik	Brennan Schiele	Brad Wuitchik	Chadd McKenzie		Twin Rivers CC, North Battleford
Yukon	Steve Fecteau	Peter Andersen	Ben Robinson	Colton Jarvis	Wade Scoffin	Whitehorse CC, Whitehorse

=== Round-robin standings ===
Final round-robin standings

Key
Teams to Championship Round

Pool A	Skip	W	L
Ontario	Greg Balsdon	6	0
New Brunswick	Jeff Lacey	4	2
Quebec	Jasmin Gibeau	4	2
British Columbia	Ron Schmidt	3	3
Northwest Territories	Jim Lockhart	2	4
Yukon	Steve Fecteau	1	5
Newfoundland and Labrador	Rod Feltham	1	5

Pool B	Skip	W	L
Manitoba	Zachary Wasylik	6	0
Alberta	Robert Johnson	4	2
Northern Ontario	Ben Mikkelsen	4	2
Saskatchewan	Cole Tenetuik	4	2
Prince Edward Island	Jamie Newson	2	4
Nova Scotia	Greg Power	1	5
Nunavut	Wade Kingdon	0	6

=== Round-robin results ===
All draws are listed in Mountain Time (UTC−07:00).

==== Draw 1 ====
Monday, November 21, 12:30 pm

Sheet C	1	2	3	4	5	6	7	8	Final
Prince Edward Island (Newson)	0	1	0	1	0	0	0	X	2
Manitoba (Wasylik)	0	0	3	0	0	0	2	X	5

Sheet D	1	2	3	4	5	6	7	8	Final
Saskatchewan (Tenetuik)	0	2	3	0	0	0	0	0	5
Northern Ontario (Mikkelsen)	1	0	0	1	1	1	1	1	6

Sheet E	1	2	3	4	5	6	7	8	Final
Alberta (Johnson)	1	0	3	1	1	1	2	X	9
Nunavut (Kingdon)	0	1	0	0	0	0	0	X	1

==== Draw 2 ====
Monday, November 21, 4:00 pm

Sheet B	1	2	3	4	5	6	7	8	Final
Quebec (Gibeau)	0	0	3	0	2	0	2	0	7
Yukon (Fecteau)	0	1	0	1	0	1	0	3	6

Sheet C	1	2	3	4	5	6	7	8	Final
New Brunswick (Lacey)	3	0	2	0	1	0	2	X	8
Northwest Territories (Lockhart)	0	1	0	1	0	1	0	X	3

Sheet D	1	2	3	4	5	6	7	8	Final
Newfoundland and Labrador (Feltham)	3	1	0	0	0	1	0	1	6
British Columbia (Schmidt)	0	0	1	1	1	0	2	0	5

==== Draw 3 ====
Monday, November 21, 7:30 pm

Sheet B	1	2	3	4	5	6	7	8	Final
Northern Ontario (Mikkelsen)	4	2	0	1	1	0	1	X	9
Prince Edward Island (Newson)	0	0	1	0	0	3	0	X	4

Sheet C	1	2	3	4	5	6	7	8	Final
Manitoba (Wasylik)	3	5	2	0	4	0	X	X	14
Nunavut (Kingdon)	0	0	0	2	0	0	X	X	2

Sheet D	1	2	3	4	5	6	7	8	Final
Nova Scotia (Power)	2	0	1	0	1	0	2	0	6
Alberta (Johnson)	0	0	0	4	0	2	0	1	7

==== Draw 4 ====
Tuesday, November 22, 9:00 am

Sheet B	1	2	3	4	5	6	7	8	9	Final
Yukon (Fecteau)	0	1	1	0	1	1	0	1	1	6
Newfoundland and Labrador (Feltham)	3	0	0	2	0	0	0	0	0	5

Sheet D	1	2	3	4	5	6	7	8	Final
Ontario (Balsdon)	0	0	1	0	3	0	3	X	7
New Brunswick (Lacey)	0	0	0	1	0	1	0	X	2

Sheet E	1	2	3	4	5	6	7	8	Final
British Columbia (Schmidt)	1	1	1	0	2	4	0	X	9
Northwest Territories (Lockhart)	0	0	0	3	0	0	2	X	5

==== Draw 5 ====
Tuesday, November 22, 12:30 pm

Sheet B	1	2	3	4	5	6	7	8	Final
Saskatchewan (Tenetuik)	0	0	0	0	0	1	0	X	1
Manitoba (Wasylik)	2	1	2	1	0	0	2	X	8

Sheet D	1	2	3	4	5	6	7	8	Final
Northern Ontario (Mikkelsen)	3	2	1	0	4	5	X	X	15
Nunavut (Kingdon)	0	0	0	1	0	0	X	X	1

Sheet E	1	2	3	4	5	6	7	8	Final
Prince Edward Island (Newson)	0	0	0	0	2	1	1	1	5
Nova Scotia (Power)	0	1	2	1	0	0	0	0	4

==== Draw 6 ====
Tuesday, November 22, 4:00 pm

Sheet C	1	2	3	4	5	6	7	8	Final
Quebec (Gibeau)	0	0	0	1	2	1	1	X	5
British Columbia (Schmidt)	0	2	0	0	0	0	0	X	2

Sheet D	1	2	3	4	5	6	7	8	Final
Yukon (Fecteau)	0	2	0	0	0	1	0	0	3
Northwest Territories (Lockhart)	1	0	1	2	0	0	2	1	7

Sheet E	1	2	3	4	5	6	7	8	Final
Newfoundland and Labrador (Feltham)	0	1	0	2	0	2	0	0	5
Ontario (Balsdon)	1	0	0	0	2	0	1	2	6

==== Draw 7 ====
Tuesday, November 22, 7:30 pm

Sheet A	1	2	3	4	5	6	7	8	9	Final
Northern Ontario (Mikkelsen)	0	1	1	0	1	2	1	0	0	6
Alberta (Johnson)	1	0	0	3	0	0	0	2	1	7

Sheet B	1	2	3	4	5	6	7	8	Final
Nunavut (Kingdon)	0	1	0	1	0	0	X	X	2
Nova Scotia (Power)	2	0	6	0	1	3	X	X	12

Sheet C	1	2	3	4	5	6	7	8	Final
Saskatchewan (Tenetuik)	2	1	1	0	2	0	0	2	8
Prince Edward Island (Newson)	0	0	0	3	0	1	1	0	5

==== Draw 8 ====
Wednesday, November 23, 9:00 am

Sheet A	1	2	3	4	5	6	7	8	Final
Quebec (Gibeau)	0	1	0	2	0	1	1	3	8
Newfoundland and Labrador (Feltham)	0	0	1	0	2	0	0	0	3

==== Draw 9 ====
Wednesday, November 23, 12:30 pm

Sheet A	1	2	3	4	5	6	7	8	Final
Manitoba (Wasylik)	0	2	3	1	0	3	X	X	9
Nova Scotia (Power)	0	0	0	0	1	0	X	X	1

Sheet B	1	2	3	4	5	6	7	8	Final
Prince Edward Island (Newson)	4	0	4	0	2	3	X	X	13
Nunavut (Kingdon)	0	1	0	1	0	0	X	X	2

Sheet C	1	2	3	4	5	6	7	8	Final
Alberta (Johnson)	0	0	1	0	0	0	X	X	1
Saskatchewan (Tenetuik)	1	2	0	2	2	1	X	X	8

Sheet D	1	2	3	4	5	6	7	8	Final
Northwest Territories (Lockhart)	1	0	1	0	1	1	X	X	4
Ontario (Balsdon)	0	5	0	7	0	0	X	X	12

Sheet E	1	2	3	4	5	6	7	8	Final
Yukon (Fecteau)	0	0	1	0	1	0	0	X	2
New Brunswick (Lacey)	0	1	0	2	0	1	1	X	5

==== Draw 11 ====
Wednesday, November 23, 7:30 pm

Sheet A	1	2	3	4	5	6	7	8	Final
British Columbia (Schmidt)	0	0	0	2	1	0	2	X	5
Ontario (Balsdon)	1	2	2	0	0	2	0	X	7

Sheet D	1	2	3	4	5	6	7	8	Final
New Brunswick (Lacey)	0	2	1	0	1	0	2	2	8
Quebec (Gibeau)	1	0	0	1	0	3	0	0	5

Sheet E	1	2	3	4	5	6	7	8	Final
Northwest Territories (Lockhart)	0	2	1	0	0	1	1	1	6
Newfoundland and Labrador (Feltham)	3	0	0	1	1	0	0	0	5

==== Draw 12 ====
Thursday, November 24, 9:00 am

Sheet B	1	2	3	4	5	6	7	8	Final
Manitoba (Wasylik)	1	0	2	0	1	1	0	X	5
Alberta (Johnson)	0	1	0	0	0	0	2	X	3

Sheet C	1	2	3	4	5	6	7	8	Final
Nova Scotia (Power)	1	0	0	1	0	0	1	X	3
Northern Ontario (Mikkelsen)	0	2	1	0	3	1	0	X	7

Sheet D	1	2	3	4	5	6	7	8	Final
Nunavut (Kingdon)	0	1	0	0	0	0	2	X	3
Saskatchewan (Tenetuik)	2	0	1	3	0	1	0	X	7

==== Draw 13 ====
Thursday, November 24, 12:30 pm

Sheet A	1	2	3	4	5	6	7	8	Final
Northwest Territories (Lockhart)	1	0	0	0	1	0	0	X	2
Quebec (Gibeau)	0	2	1	1	0	3	1	X	8

Sheet B	1	2	3	4	5	6	7	8	Final
New Brunswick (Lacey)	0	1	0	2	0	0	0	0	3
British Columbia (Schmidt)	0	0	2	0	0	2	1	1	6

Sheet E	1	2	3	4	5	6	7	8	Final
Ontario (Balsdon)	3	1	0	5	4	0	X	X	13
Yukon (Fecteau)	0	0	1	0	0	1	X	X	2

==== Draw 14 ====
Thursday, November 24, 4:00 pm

Sheet E	1	2	3	4	5	6	7	8	Final
Nova Scotia (Power)	1	0	0	1	0	2	X	X	4
Saskatchewan (Tenetuik)	0	3	4	0	4	0	X	X	11

==== Draw 15 ====
Thursday, November 24, 7:30 pm

Sheet A	1	2	3	4	5	6	7	8	Final
Prince Edward Island (Newson)	1	0	0	0	0	1	0	X	2
Alberta (Johnson)	0	2	2	2	2	0	2	X	10

Sheet B	1	2	3	4	5	6	7	8	Final
Newfoundland and Labrador (Feltham)	2	0	0	0	0	0	0	X	2
New Brunswick (Lacey)	0	3	1	2	1	1	0	X	8

Sheet C	1	2	3	4	5	6	7	8	Final
Ontario (Balsdon)	2	1	0	1	0	1	1	X	6
Quebec (Gibeau)	0	0	2	0	1	0	0	X	3

Sheet D	1	2	3	4	5	6	7	8	Final
British Columbia (Schmidt)	2	3	0	1	1	0	0	1	8
Yukon (Fecteau)	0	0	3	0	0	1	3	0	7

Sheet E	1	2	3	4	5	6	7	8	Final
Manitoba (Wasylik)	0	1	3	2	2	0	0	X	8
Northern Ontario (Mikkelsen)	1	0	0	0	0	2	1	X	4

=== Championship round ===
==== A Bracket ====
Qualifier 1
A1	Ontario	6
B4	Saskatchewan	5
A1	Ontario	6
A3	Quebec	5
B2	Alberta	3
A3	Quebec	6

Qualifier 2
B1	Manitoba	6
A4	British Columbia	5
B1	Manitoba	6
B3	Northern Ontario	9
A2	New Brunswick	5
B3	Northern Ontario	8

==== B Bracket ====
			Qualifier 3
			B1	Manitoba	2
B4	Saskatchewan	1	B2	Alberta	11
B2	Alberta	9

			Qualifier 4
			A3	Quebec	7
A4	British Columbia	3	A2	New Brunswick	6
A2	New Brunswick	13

==== A Event ====
===== Semifinals =====
Friday, November 25, 11:00 am

Sheet A	1	2	3	4	5	6	7	8	Final
Alberta (Johnson)	0	0	1	0	0	0	2	X	3
Quebec (Gibeau)	2	1	0	1	1	1	0	X	6

Sheet B	1	2	3	4	5	6	7	8	9	Final
Manitoba (Wasylik)	2	1	0	2	0	0	0	0	1	6
British Columbia (Schmidt)	0	0	3	0	1	0	0	1	0	5

Sheet C	1	2	3	4	5	6	7	8	Final
Ontario (Balsdon)	1	1	0	0	0	0	4	0	6
Saskatchewan (Tenetuik)	0	0	2	0	0	0	0	3	5

Sheet D	1	2	3	4	5	6	7	8	Final
New Brunswick (Lacey)	2	0	2	0	0	1	0	0	5
Northern Ontario (Mikkelsen)	0	3	0	3	1	0	0	1	8

===== Finals =====
Friday, November 25, 5:00 pm

Sheet C	1	2	3	4	5	6	7	8	Final
Manitoba (Wasylik)	1	0	2	0	2	0	1	0	6
Northern Ontario (Mikkelsen)	0	3	0	2	0	3	0	1	9

Sheet D	1	2	3	4	5	6	7	8	Final
Ontario (Balsdon)	0	2	1	0	1	0	2	0	6
Quebec (Gibeau)	1	0	0	1	0	2	0	1	5

==== B Event ====
===== Semifinals =====
Friday, November 25, 5:00 pm

Sheet A	1	2	3	4	5	6	7	8	Final
British Columbia (Schmidt)	0	0	2	0	1	0	X	X	3
New Brunswick (Lacey)	6	3	0	2	0	2	X	X	13

Sheet B	1	2	3	4	5	6	7	8	Final
Saskatchewan (Tenetuik)	0	0	1	0	0	0	X	X	1
Alberta (Johnson)	3	1	0	0	2	3	X	X	9

===== Finals =====
Friday, November 25, 9:00 pm

Sheet D	1	2	3	4	5	6	7	8	Final
Quebec (Gibeau)	0	1	0	3	0	1	0	2	7
New Brunswick (Lacey)	1	0	2	0	1	0	2	0	6

Sheet E	1	2	3	4	5	6	7	8	Final
Manitoba (Wasylik)	0	0	1	0	1	0	X	X	2
Alberta (Johnson)	1	3	0	3	0	4	X	X	11

=== Playoffs ===
Semifinals
1	Ontario	12
4	Alberta	4
2	Northern Ontario	4
3	Quebec	5

Final
1	Ontario	6
3	Quebec	2
Bronze medal game
4	Alberta	6
2	Northern Ontario	4

==== Semifinals ====
Saturday, November 26, 10:00 am

Sheet C	1	2	3	4	5	6	7	8	Final
Ontario (Balsdon)	1	2	0	5	0	4	X	X	12
Alberta (Johnson)	0	0	2	0	2	0	X	X	4

Sheet E	1	2	3	4	5	6	7	8	Final
Northern Ontario (Mikkelsen)	1	2	0	0	0	0	1	0	4
Quebec (Gibeau)	0	0	1	2	0	1	0	1	5

==== Bronze medal game ====
Saturday, November 26, 3:30 pm

Sheet B	1	2	3	4	5	6	7	8	Final
Alberta (Johnson)	2	2	0	1	0	0	1	X	6
Northern Ontario (Mikkelsen)	0	0	1	0	2	1	0	X	4

==== Gold medal game ====
Saturday, November 26, 3:30 pm

Sheet D	1	2	3	4	5	6	7	8	Final
Ontario (Balsdon)	2	0	0	1	0	2	1	X	6
Quebec (Gibeau)	0	0	1	0	1	0	0	X	2

== Women ==
=== Teams ===
The teams are listed as follows:

Team	Skip	Third	Second	Lead	Alternate	Club
Alberta	Vanessa McConnell	Tia-Jayne Clark	Valerie Ekelund	Alice MacKay	Lindsay MacDonald	North Hill CC, Calgary
British Columbia	Kim Dennis	Heather Beatty	Allison Dentoom	Jennifer Gauthier		Delta Thistle CC, Delta
Manitoba	Lisa Birchard	Kelsey Meger	Breanne Yozenko	Ciara Okumura	Jenessa Rutter	Pembina CC, Winnipeg
New Brunswick	Shaelyn Park	Krista Flanagan	Lynn LeBlanc	Shannon Tatlock		Curl Moncton, Moncton
Newfoundland and Labrador	Susan Curtis	Amanda Young	Amy Fitzpatrick	Michelle Zieger	Donna Davis	Corner Brook CC, Corner Brook
Northern Ontario	Jodi Judd	Judy Bouchard	Kelli Beda-Stevenson	Tracey Berry	Rhanda Dora	Port Arthur CC, Thunder Bay
Northwest Territories	Betti Delorey	Halli-Rai Delorey	Julie Squires-Rowe	Amanda Roach		Hay River CC, Hay River
Nova Scotia	Meredith Harrison	Courtney Smith	Gilda Chisholm	Shauna Collier	Heather Kennedy	Bluenose CC, New Glasgow
Ontario	Chrissy Cadorin	Colleen Madonia	Lauren Harrison	Leigh Mendes		The Thornhill Club, Thornhill
Prince Edward Island	Veronica Smith	Julia Hunter	Emily Best	Sabrina Smith		Summerside CC, Summerside
Quebec	Isabelle Néron	Karine Tremblay	Édith Cottenoir	Véronique Bouchard		CC Chicoutimi, Chicoutimi
Saskatchewan	Rebecca Ryde	Ellen Redlick	Leigh Dick	Amanda Torrance		Nutana CC, Saskatoon

=== Round-robin standings ===
Final round-robin standings

Key
Teams to Championship Round

Pool A	Skip	W	L
Manitoba	Lisa Birchard	4	1
Quebec	Isabelle Néron	3	2
British Columbia	Kim Dennis	2	3
Nova Scotia	Meredith Harrison	2	3
Newfoundland and Labrador	Susan Curtis	2	3
Northwest Territories	Betti Delorey	2	3

Pool B	Skip	W	L
Saskatchewan	Rebecca Ryde	4	1
New Brunswick	Shaelyn Park	3	2
Alberta	Vanessa McConnell	3	2
Ontario	Chrissy Cadorin	2	3
Prince Edward Island	Veronica Smith	2	3
Northern Ontario	Jodi Judd	1	4

=== Round-robin results ===
All draws are listed in Mountain Time (UTC−07:00).

==== Draw 1 ====
Monday, November 21, 12:30 pm

Sheet A	1	2	3	4	5	6	7	8	9	Final
Manitoba (Birchard)	0	0	2	0	0	2	1	0	1	6
Quebec (Néron)	0	1	0	3	0	0	0	1	0	5

Sheet B	1	2	3	4	5	6	7	8	Final
Northwest Territories (Delorey)	0	0	0	0	1	1	0	X	2
Newfoundland and Labrador (Curtis)	1	4	1	0	0	0	1	X	7

==== Draw 2 ====
Monday, November 21, 4:00 pm

Sheet A	1	2	3	4	5	6	7	8	Final
Saskatchewan (Ryde)	3	2	2	2	3	0	X	X	12
Northern Ontario (Judd)	0	0	0	0	0	2	X	X	2

Sheet E	1	2	3	4	5	6	7	8	Final
New Brunswick (Park)	0	0	2	1	1	0	2	1	7
Prince Edward Island (Smith)	2	3	0	0	0	1	0	0	6

==== Draw 3 ====
Monday, November 21, 7:30 pm

Sheet A	1	2	3	4	5	6	7	8	Final
Newfoundland and Labrador (Curtis)	1	0	3	0	1	0	0	X	5
British Columbia (Dennis)	0	2	0	3	0	3	3	X	11

Sheet E	1	2	3	4	5	6	7	8	Final
Ontario (Cadorin)	0	0	2	0	0	0	1	X	3
Alberta (McConnell)	1	1	0	2	1	2	0	X	7

==== Draw 4 ====
Tuesday, November 22, 9:00 am

Sheet A	1	2	3	4	5	6	7	8	Final
Nova Scotia (Harrison)	2	2	2	0	0	3	X	X	9
Northwest Territories (Delorey)	0	0	0	1	1	0	X	X	2

Sheet C	1	2	3	4	5	6	7	8	Final
Prince Edward Island (Smith)	1	2	1	0	2	0	1	X	7
Northern Ontario (Judd)	0	0	0	2	0	2	0	X	4

==== Draw 5 ====
Tuesday, November 22, 12:30 pm

Sheet C	1	2	3	4	5	6	7	8	Final
British Columbia (Dennis)	3	0	0	0	0	1	0	0	4
Manitoba (Birchard)	0	2	1	1	0	0	1	4	9

==== Draw 6 ====
Tuesday, November 22, 4:00 pm

Sheet A	1	2	3	4	5	6	7	8	9	Final
New Brunswick (Park)	0	3	0	1	0	0	0	3	0	7
Ontario (Cadorin)	1	0	1	0	2	2	1	0	1	8

Sheet B	1	2	3	4	5	6	7	8	9	Final
Newfoundland and Labrador (Curtis)	0	1	1	0	1	0	1	1	0	5
Nova Scotia (Harrison)	2	0	0	2	0	1	0	0	1	6

==== Draw 7 ====
Tuesday, November 22, 7:30 pm

Sheet D	1	2	3	4	5	6	7	8	Final
Northwest Territories (Delorey)	0	0	0	0	0	2	X	X	2
Manitoba (Birchard)	0	1	5	2	1	0	X	X	9

Sheet E	1	2	3	4	5	6	7	8	Final
Alberta (McConnell)	0	2	2	1	0	2	1	X	8
Saskatchewan (Ryde)	1	0	0	0	1	0	0	X	2

==== Draw 8 ====
Wednesday, November 23, 9:00 am

Sheet B	1	2	3	4	5	6	7	8	Final
Northern Ontario (Judd)	0	0	2	1	0	0	1	0	4
Alberta (McConnell)	2	1	0	0	1	0	0	1	5

Sheet C	1	2	3	4	5	6	7	8	Final
New Brunswick (Park)	1	0	2	0	1	0	0	X	4
Saskatchewan (Ryde)	0	2	0	2	0	2	1	X	7

Sheet D	1	2	3	4	5	6	7	8	Final
Prince Edward Island (Smith)	0	0	0	2	0	1	0	X	3
Ontario (Cadorin)	1	0	0	0	2	0	2	X	5

Sheet E	1	2	3	4	5	6	7	8	Final
Quebec (Néron)	1	0	3	0	0	1	0	2	7
Nova Scotia (Harrison)	0	1	0	3	0	0	1	0	5

==== Draw 10 ====
Wednesday, November 23, 4:00 pm

Sheet A	1	2	3	4	5	6	7	8	Final
Ontario (Cadorin)	0	0	0	0	1	0	1	0	2
Saskatchewan (Ryde)	1	1	1	1	0	1	0	1	6

Sheet C	1	2	3	4	5	6	7	8	Final
Alberta (McConnell)	0	1	1	0	0	1	0	X	3
Prince Edward Island (Smith)	1	0	0	2	1	0	2	X	6

Sheet D	1	2	3	4	5	6	7	8	Final
Northern Ontario (Judd)	0	2	0	0	0	0	X	X	2
New Brunswick (Park)	2	0	4	1	2	3	X	X	12

Sheet E	1	2	3	4	5	6	7	8	Final
Newfoundland and Labrador (Curtis)	0	0	0	2	3	2	0	1	8
Manitoba (Birchard)	0	2	1	0	0	0	3	0	6

==== Draw 11 ====
Wednesday, November 23, 7:30 pm

Sheet B	1	2	3	4	5	6	7	8	Final
Nova Scotia (Harrison)	0	0	1	0	0	1	X	X	2
British Columbia (Dennis)	4	2	0	3	1	0	X	X	10

Sheet C	1	2	3	4	5	6	7	8	Final
Quebec (Néron)	0	1	0	0	0	1	0	X	2
Northwest Territories (Delorey)	1	0	0	3	2	0	1	X	7

==== Draw 12 ====
Thursday, November 24, 9:00 am

Sheet E	1	2	3	4	5	6	7	8	Final
British Columbia (Dennis)	0	2	0	0	0	0	5	0	7
Quebec (Néron)	1	0	2	1	0	2	0	2	8

==== Draw 13 ====
Thursday, November 24, 12:30 pm

Sheet C	1	2	3	4	5	6	7	8	9	Final
Manitoba (Birchard)	0	1	0	1	0	2	2	0	1	7
Nova Scotia (Harrison)	1	0	3	0	1	0	0	1	0	6

Sheet D	1	2	3	4	5	6	7	8	Final
Saskatchewan (Ryde)	0	0	0	1	2	1	1	X	5
Prince Edward Island (Smith)	0	0	1	0	0	0	0	X	1

==== Draw 14 ====
Thursday, November 24, 4:00 pm

Sheet A	1	2	3	4	5	6	7	8	Final
Quebec (Néron)	0	1	0	0	3	1	0	1	6
Newfoundland and Labrador (Curtis)	1	0	1	2	0	0	1	0	5

Sheet B	1	2	3	4	5	6	7	8	Final
Alberta (McConnell)	0	1	0	0	0	3	0	X	4
New Brunswick (Park)	1	0	1	1	1	0	2	X	6

Sheet C	1	2	3	4	5	6	7	8	9	Final
Northern Ontario (Judd)	0	0	1	1	0	3	1	0	1	7
Ontario (Cadorin)	2	2	0	0	1	0	0	1	0	6

Sheet D	1	2	3	4	5	6	7	8	Final
British Columbia (Dennis)	1	0	2	0	2	3	0	0	8
Northwest Territories (Delorey)	0	2	0	4	0	0	2	1	9

=== Championship round ===
==== A Bracket ====
Qualifier 1
A1	Manitoba	1
B4	Ontario	9
B4	Ontario	4
B2	New Brunswick	10
B2	New Brunswick	11
A3	British Columbia	2

Qualifier 2
B1	Saskatchewan	5
A4	Nova Scotia	6
A4	Nova Scotia	10
A2	Quebec	8
A2	Quebec	9
B3	Alberta	8

==== B Bracket ====
			Qualifier 3
			A2	Quebec	5
A1	Manitoba	7	A1	Manitoba	3
A3	British Columbia	5

			Qualifier 4
			B4	Ontario	10
B1	Saskatchewan	6	B3	Alberta	3
B3	Alberta	7

==== A Event ====
===== Semifinals =====
Friday, November 25, 8:00 am

Sheet B	1	2	3	4	5	6	7	8	Final
Saskatchewan (Ryde)	0	1	1	0	1	0	2	0	5
Nova Scotia (Harrison)	0	0	0	3	0	2	0	1	6

Sheet C	1	2	3	4	5	6	7	8	Final
Manitoba (Birchard)	0	0	1	0	0	0	0	X	1
Ontario (Cadorin)	1	0	0	2	1	3	2	X	9

Sheet D	1	2	3	4	5	6	7	8	9	Final
Quebec (Néron)	0	3	0	1	0	3	1	0	1	9
Alberta (McConnell)	2	0	3	0	2	0	0	1	0	8

Sheet E	1	2	3	4	5	6	7	8	Final
New Brunswick (Park)	1	2	1	2	0	2	3	X	11
British Columbia (Dennis)	0	0	0	0	2	0	0	X	2

===== Finals =====
Friday, November 25, 2:00 pm

Sheet C	1	2	3	4	5	6	7	8	9	Final
Nova Scotia (Harrison)	0	0	2	1	4	0	1	0	2	10
Quebec (Néron)	2	2	0	0	0	2	0	2	0	8

Sheet D	1	2	3	4	5	6	7	8	Final
Ontario (Cadorin)	0	1	0	0	0	1	2	0	4
New Brunswick (Park)	2	0	1	1	2	0	0	4	10

==== B Event ====
===== Semifinals =====
Friday, November 25, 2:00 pm

Sheet B	1	2	3	4	5	6	7	8	Final
Manitoba (Birchard)	2	1	2	0	2	0	0	0	7
British Columbia (Dennis)	0	0	0	1	0	1	2	1	5

Sheet E	1	2	3	4	5	6	7	8	Final
Saskatchewan (Ryde)	1	1	0	2	0	0	2	0	6
Alberta (McConnell)	0	0	1	0	1	3	0	2	7

===== Finals =====
Friday, November 25, 9:00 pm

Sheet A	1	2	3	4	5	6	7	8	Final
Quebec (Néron)	0	0	2	1	0	1	0	1	5
Manitoba (Birchard)	1	1	0	0	0	0	1	0	3

Sheet C	1	2	3	4	5	6	7	8	Final
Ontario (Cadorin)	0	3	0	4	0	1	2	X	10
Alberta (McConnell)	1	0	1	0	1	0	0	X	3

=== Playoffs ===
Semifinals
1	New Brunswick	8
4	Quebec	4
2	Nova Scotia	2
3	Ontario	8

Final
1	New Brunswick	8
3	Ontario	7
Bronze medal game
4	Quebec	5
2	Nova Scotia	6

==== Semifinals ====
Saturday, November 26, 10:00 am

Sheet B	1	2	3	4	5	6	7	8	Final
New Brunswick (Park)	2	0	0	1	0	2	3	X	8
Quebec (Néron)	0	2	1	0	1	0	0	X	4

Sheet D	1	2	3	4	5	6	7	8	Final
Nova Scotia (Harrison)	0	1	0	0	0	1	0	X	2
Ontario (Cadorin)	3	0	2	1	1	0	1	X	8

==== Bronze medal game ====
Saturday, November 26, 3:30 pm

Sheet E	1	2	3	4	5	6	7	8	9	Final
Quebec (Néron)	0	1	0	1	0	1	2	0	0	5
Nova Scotia (Harrison)	1	0	1	0	1	0	0	2	1	6

==== Gold medal game ====
Saturday, November 26, 3:30 pm

Sheet C	1	2	3	4	5	6	7	8	Final
New Brunswick (Park)	2	0	1	3	0	1	0	1	8
Ontario (Cadorin)	0	2	0	0	2	0	3	0	7
