= 2017 Travelers Curling Club Championship =

Canadian national curling championship edition

- Host city: Kingston, Ontario
- Arena: Cataraqui Golf and Country Club
- Dates: November 20–25
- Men's winner: British Columbia
- Curling club: Nanaimo CC, Nanaimo
- Skip: Bart Sawyer
- Third: Steve Waatainen
- Second: Craig Burton
- Lead: Keith Clarke
- Finalist: Manitoba (Mark Anderson)
- Women's winner: Manitoba
- Curling club: Brandon CC, Brandon
- Skip: Stacey Fordyce
- Third: Christy Erickson
- Second: Stacey Irwin
- Lead: Pam Gouldie
- Finalist: Alberta (Nanette Dupont)

The 2017 Travelers Curling Club Championship was held from November 20 to 25 at the Cataraqui Golf and Country Club in Kingston, Ontario.

== Men ==
=== Teams ===
Province	Skip	Third	Second	Lead	Locale
Alberta	John Mryglod	Joe Mrygold	Chris Hamula	Derrick Armstrong	Calmar CC, Calmar
British Columbia	Bart Sawyer	Steve Waatainen	Craig Burton	Keith Clarke	Nanaimo CC, Nanaimo
Manitoba	Mark Anderson	Jeremy Short	Bryce Granger	Riley Willows	Riverview CC, Brandon
New Brunswick	Wayne Aubie	Phil Leger	Francis Frenette	Dan Blacquiere	Beresford Sportek, Beresford
Newfoundland and Labrador	Andrew Symonds	Mark Healy	Dave Noftall	Keith Jewer	Re/Max Centre, St. John's
Northern Ontario	Jeff Brown	Gavan Jamieson	Steve Decary	Bobby Ray	North Bay Granite CC, North Bay
Northwest Territories	Kim Paulson	Mitchell Wiles	Nick Rivet	Clayton Pielak	Yellowknife CC, Yellowknife
Nova Scotia	Nicholas Deagle	Jason van Vonderen	Robert Phillips	Ryan Sperry	Bridgewater CC, Bridgewater
Nunavut	Kyle Nowlan	Eiryn Devereaux	Mike Kendall	Mitch Bacon	Iqaluit CC, Iqaluit
Ontario	Jon St. Denis	Steve Anderson	Jordan Keon	Curtis Samoy	Richmond Hill CC, Richmond Hill
Prince Edward Island	Leo Stewart	Barry Cameron	Darrell Thibault	Corey Montgomery	Silver Fox CC, Summerside
Quebec	Emmanuel Lavigne	Jean-Francois Lamontagne	Christian Bilodeau	Benoit Giguere	CC Laurier, Victoriaville
Saskatchewan	Adam Himmelspach	James Gordon	Wade St. Onge	Ryan Hansen	Power Dodge CC, Estevan
Yukon	Dustin Mikkelsen	Scott Williamson	Brandon Hagen	Scott Cole	Whitehorse CC, Whitehorse

=== Round-robin standings ===
Key
Teams to Playoffs

==== Pool A ====
Team	W	L
British Columbia	5	1
Alberta	5	1
Newfoundland and Labrador	4	2
Saskatchewan	3	3
Quebec	2	4
New Brunswick	2	4
Nunavut	0	6

==== Pool B ====
Team	W	L
Manitoba	5	1
Ontario	5	1
Nova Scotia	4	2
Northern Ontario	3	3
Yukon	2	4
Northwest Territories	2	4
Prince Edward Island	0	6

=== Playoffs ===
Quarterfinal
B2	Ontario	6
A3	Newfoundland and Labrador	7
A2	Alberta	5
B3	Nova Scotia	3

Semifinal
A1	British Columbia	5
A3	Newfoundland and Labrador	2
B1	Manitoba	7
A2	Alberta	2

Final
A1	British Columbia	7
B1	Manitoba	3

Bronze-medal game
A3	Newfoundland and Labrador	4
A2	Alberta	10

==== Quarterfinals ====
Thursday, November 24, 1:30pm

Team	1	2	3	4	5	6	7	8	Final
Ontario (St. Denis) 🔨	0	0	2	0	3	1	0	0	6
Newfoundland and Labrador (Symonds)	0	1	0	5	0	0	0	1	7

Team	1	2	3	4	5	6	7	8	Final
Alberta (Mryglod) 🔨	0	1	0	1	0	1	2	0	5
Nova Scotia (Deagle)	0	0	1	0	1	0	0	1	3

==== Semifinals ====
Thursday, November 24, 6:30pm

Team	1	2	3	4	5	6	7	8	Final
British Columbia (Sawyer) 🔨	0	2	0	2	0	1	0	X	5
Newfoundland and Labrador (Symonds)	0	0	0	0	1	0	1	X	2

Team	1	2	3	4	5	6	7	8	Final
Manitoba (Anderson) 🔨	2	0	1	1	1	0	2	X	7
Alberta (Mryglod)	0	1	0	0	0	1	0	X	2

==== Bronze-medal game ====
Saturday, November 25, 9:00am

Team	1	2	3	4	5	6	7	8	Final
Newfoundland and Labrador (Symonds)	1	0	2	0	1	0	X	X	4
Alberta (Mryglod) 🔨	0	2	0	4	0	4	X	X	10

==== Final ====
Saturday, November 25, 9:00am

Team	1	2	3	4	5	6	7	8	Final
British Columbia (Sawyer)	0	0	5	0	0	2	0	X	7
Manitoba (Anderson) 🔨	0	1	0	0	1	0	1	X	3

== Women ==
=== Teams ===
Province	Skip	Third	Second	Lead	Locale
Alberta	Nanette Dupont	Samantha Davies	Kendra Nakagama	Avice DeKelver	Lethbridge CC, Lethbridge
British Columbia	Kim Dennis	Heather Beatty	Dawn Mesana	Jenn Gauthier	Richmond CC, Richmond
Manitoba	Stacey Fordyce	Christy Erickson	Stacey Irwin	Pam Gouldie	Brandon CC, Brandon
New Brunswick	Heather Munn	Kim Dow	Michaela Downey	Sabrina Keyes	Thistle St. Andrews CC, Saint John
Newfoundland and Labrador	Wendy Dunne	Jennifer Taylor	Andrea Heffernan	Susie Ennis	RE/MAX Centre, St. John's
Northern Ontario	Melanie Patry	Christine Dubuc	Nicole Dubuc-Charbonneau	Bryna Patman	Coniston CC, Coniston
Northwest Territories	Kristan Thompson	Sarah Stroeder	Alanah Jansen	Anneli Jokela	Yellowknife CC, Yellowknife
Nova Scotia	Liz Garnett	Celina Thompson (skip)	Mandy Grace	Dalyce Wilson	Mayflower CC, Halifax
Nunavut	Anu Boucher	Rachel Teoret-Gosselin	Megan Ingram	Dyan White	Iqaluit CC, Iqaluit / Qavik CC, Rankin Inlet
Ontario	Jodi McCutcheon	Kris Wannan	Kelly Williams	Suan Chen	High Park, Toronto
Prince Edward Island	Julie Mutch	Lindsay Moore	Terri Wood	Heather MacRae	Crapaud CC, Crapaud
Quebec	Josee Leprohon	Nathalie Messier	Catherine Fiola	Merlene Berube	CC Boucherville, Boucherville
Saskatchewan	Kristi Frolek	Nicole Beausoliel	Christy Walker	Kristy Bird	Twin Rivers CC, North Battleford
Yukon	Peggy Dorosz	Laini Klassen	Kandice Braga	Inge Brown	Whitehorse CC, Whitehorse

=== Round-robin standings ===
Key
Teams to Playoffs
Teams to Tiebreaker

==== Pool A ====
Team	W	L
Manitoba	5	1
Ontario	5	1
Nova Scotia	3	3
New Brunswick	3	3
Quebec	3	3
Newfoundland and Labrador	1	5
Yukon	1	5

==== Pool B ====
Team	W	L
Alberta	5	1
British Columbia	5	1
Prince Edward Island	4	2
Northern Ontario	3	3
Saskatchewan	2	4
Northwest Territories	2	4
Nunavut	0	6

=== Tiebreakers ===
==== Tiebreaker 1 ====
Thursday, November 24, 11:00pm

Team	1	2	3	4	5	6	7	8	9	Final
Quebec (Leprohon) 🔨	0	1	0	1	0	1	0	1	0	4
New Brunswick (Munn)	0	0	2	0	1	0	1	0	2	6

==== Tiebreaker 2 ====
Thursday, November 24, 8:30am

Team	1	2	3	4	5	6	7	8	Final
Nova Scotia (Thompson) 🔨	0	2	0	2	0	2	2	X	8
New Brunswick (Munn)	1	0	2	0	1	0	0	X	4

=== Playoffs ===
Quarterfinal
B2	British Columbia	4
A3	Nova Scotia	5
A2	Ontario	5
B3	Prince Edward Island	2

Semifinal
A1	Manitoba	8
A3	Nova Scotia	1
B1	Alberta	7
A2	Ontario	3

Final
A1	Manitoba	11
B1	Alberta	3

Bronze-medal game
A3	Nova Scotia	3
A2	Ontario	10

==== Quarterfinals ====
Thursday, November 24, 1:30pm

Team	1	2	3	4	5	6	7	8	9	Final
British Columbia (Dennis) 🔨	0	0	2	0	1	1	0	0	0	4
Nova Scotia (Thompson)	0	1	0	2	0	0	0	1	1	5

Team	1	2	3	4	5	6	7	8	Final
Ontario (McCutcheon) 🔨	1	0	0	1	1	1	1	X	5
Prince Edward Island (Mutch)	0	1	1	0	0	0	0	X	2

==== Semifinals ====
Thursday, November 24, 6:30pm

Team	1	2	3	4	5	6	7	8	Final
Manitoba (Fordyce) 🔨	2	0	1	1	0	4	X	X	8
Nova Scotia (Thompson)	0	0	0	0	1	0	X	X	1

Team	1	2	3	4	5	6	7	8	Final
Alberta (Dupont)	0	1	0	1	0	4	1	X	7
Ontario (McCutcheon) 🔨	1	0	1	0	1	0	0	X	3

==== Bronze-medal game ====
Saturday, November 25, 9:00am

Team	1	2	3	4	5	6	7	8	Final
Nova Scotia (Thompson)	0	0	0	1	0	2	0	X	3
Ontario (McCutcheon) 🔨	1	0	5	0	2	0	2	X	10

==== Final ====
Saturday, November 25, 9:00am

Team	1	2	3	4	5	6	7	8	Final
Manitoba (Fordyce) 🔨	2	2	0	2	5	0	X	X	11
Alberta (Dupont)	0	0	2	0	0	1	X	X	3
