= 2024 Canadian Curling Club Championships =

Canadian national curling championship edition

2024 Everest Canadian Curling Club Championships
- Host city: Barrie, Ontario
- Arena: Barrie Curling Club
- Dates: November 18–24
- Men's winner: Ontario
- Curling club: Richmond Hill CC, Richmond Hill
- Skip: Jordan Keon
- Third: Ryan Werenich
- Second: Curtis Samoy
- Lead: Trevor Talbott
- Finalist: Manitoba (Wasylik)
- Women's winner: Nova Scotia
- Curling club: Lakeshore CC, Lower Sackville
- Skip: Michelle Armstrong
- Third: Julie McEvoy
- Second: Abby Miller
- Lead: Kathleen Porter
- Alternate: Mary Mason
- Finalist: Prince Edward Island (Power)

The 2024 Everest Canadian Curling Club Championships was held from November 18 to 24 at the Barrie Curling Club in Barrie, Ontario. The event is the Canadian championship for recreational or "club-level" curling, that is for curlers who are not currently playing at the high performance level.

== Men ==
=== Teams ===
The teams are listed as follows:

Team	Skip	Third	Second	Lead	Alternate	Club
Alberta	Rob Johnson	Lyle Kent	Steve Thomas	Nathan Relitz	Austin Nixdorff	Irricana CC, Irricana
British Columbia	Jeff Guignard	Chris Faa	Patrick Prade	Chris Gomes		Richmond CC, Richmond
Manitoba	Zachary Wasylik	Jack Hykaway	Joshua Harding	Graham Normand	Andrew Peck	Pembina CC, Winnipeg
New Brunswick	Jeff Lacey	Mitch Downey	Peter Case	Nick Munn	Spencer Mawhinney	Thistle-St. Andrews CC, Saint John
Newfoundland and Labrador	Randy Turpin	Scott Eaton	Shawn Hawco	Steve Routledge		St. John's CC, St. John's
Northern Ontario	Dylan Johnston	Chris Briand	Brennan Wark	Jordan Potter		Fort William CC, Thunder Bay
Northwest Territories	D’arcy Delorey	Pat Cove	Glenn Smith	Dallas Weaver		Hay River CC, Hay River
Nova Scotia	Travis Stone	Kurt Roach	Mark MacNamara	Robin Nathanson		Sydney CC, Sydney
Nunavut	Wade Kingdon	Greg Howard	Hunter Tootoo	Adam Fisher		Iqaluit CC, Iqaluit
Ontario	Jordan Keon	Ryan Werenich	Curtis Samoy	Trevor Talbott		Richmond Hill CC, Richmond Hill
Prince Edward Island	Blair Jay	Corey Montgomery	Mitchell Rowley	Glenn Rogers		Summerside CC, Summerside
Quebec	Pierre Lanoue (Fourth)	Stéphane Brabant (Skip)	Maxandre Caron	Dave Olsthoorn		CC Boucherville, Boucherville
Saskatchewan	Aaron Shutra	Justin Heather	Trevor Woiden	Stephen McDonald		Nutana CC, Saskatoon
Yukon	Steve Fecteau	Ben Robinson	Colton Jarvis	Joe Wallingham		Whitehorse CC, Whitehorse

=== Round robin standings ===
Final Round Robin Standings

Key
Teams to Championship Round

Pool A	Skip	W	L	W-L	LSD
Ontario	Jordan Keon	6	0	–	299.8
Alberta	Rob Johnson	5	1	–	1008.8
Manitoba	Zachary Wasylik	4	2	–	386.4
New Brunswick	Jeff Lacey	3	3	–	680.4
Newfoundland and Labrador	Randy Turpin	2	4	–	635.9
Yukon	Steve Fecteau	1	5	–	897.1
Prince Edward Island	Blair Jay	0	6	–	1212.1

Pool B	Skip	W	L	W-L	LSD
Nova Scotia	Travis Stone	5	1	–	702.0
Northern Ontario	Dylan Johnston	4	2	2–0	644.9
Quebec	Stéphane Brabant	4	2	1–1	413.6
British Columbia	Jeff Guignard	4	2	0–2	763.5
Saskatchewan	Aaron Shutra	3	3	–	763.9
Northwest Territories	D’arcy Delorey	1	5	–	897.2
Nunavut	Wade Kingdon	0	6	–	1831.2

=== Round robin results ===
All draws are listed in Eastern Time (UTC−05:00).

==== Draw 2 ====
Monday, November 18, 8:00 pm

Sheet 1	1	2	3	4	5	6	7	8	Final
Yukon (Fecteau)	0	1	0	1	0	1	0	X	3
Newfoundland and Labrador (Turpin)	2	0	2	0	1	0	3	X	8

Sheet 2	1	2	3	4	5	6	7	8	Final
Saskatchewan (Shutra)	1	0	0	1	0	1	0	1	4
Northern Ontario (Johnston)	0	1	0	0	1	0	0	0	2

Sheet 3	1	2	3	4	5	6	7	8	Final
Ontario (Keon)	0	0	0	0	0	3	2	X	5
Manitoba (Wasylik)	0	0	1	0	0	0	0	X	1

Sheet 4	1	2	3	4	5	6	7	8	Final
British Columbia (Guignard)	0	1	0	2	0	2	0	1	6
Northwest Territories (Delorey)	0	0	0	0	2	0	1	0	3

Sheet 5	1	2	3	4	5	6	7	8	Final
Prince Edward Island (Jay)	1	0	1	1	0	1	0	X	4
Alberta (Johnson)	0	1	0	0	2	0	3	X	6

Sheet 6	1	2	3	4	5	6	7	8	Final
Nunavut (Kingdon)	0	0	0	1	0	1	X	X	2
Nova Scotia (Stone)	3	2	1	0	3	0	X	X	9

==== Draw 4 ====
Tuesday, November 19, 12:30 pm

Sheet 1	1	2	3	4	5	6	7	8	Final
British Columbia (Guignard)	0	0	2	0	0	2	0	1	5
Saskatchewan (Shutra)	0	2	0	0	1	0	1	0	4

Sheet 2	1	2	3	4	5	6	7	8	Final
Quebec (Brabant)	0	0	3	0	2	0	1	0	6
Nova Scotia (Stone)	1	2	0	3	0	2	0	1	9

Sheet 3	1	2	3	4	5	6	7	8	Final
Prince Edward Island (Jay)	0	0	0	2	0	0	X	X	2
New Brunswick (Lacey)	4	3	1	0	0	1	X	X	9

Sheet 4	1	2	3	4	5	6	7	8	Final
Northern Ontario (Johnston)	4	0	0	4	0	2	X	X	10
Nunavut (Kingdon)	0	2	0	0	1	0	X	X	3

Sheet 5	1	2	3	4	5	6	7	8	Final
Ontario (Keon)	3	0	0	1	0	2	0	3	9
Yukon (Fecteau)	0	1	1	0	1	0	2	0	5

Sheet 6	1	2	3	4	5	6	7	8	Final
Manitoba (Wasylik)	2	2	2	0	1	0	0	X	7
Newfoundland and Labrador (Turpin)	0	0	0	2	0	1	0	X	3

==== Draw 6 ====
Tuesday, November 19, 7:30 pm

Sheet 1	1	2	3	4	5	6	7	8	Final
Alberta (Johnson)	0	0	1	0	2	0	1	X	4
Ontario (Keon)	2	2	0	1	0	4	0	X	9

Sheet 2	1	2	3	4	5	6	7	8	Final
Newfoundland and Labrador (Turpin)	3	0	0	2	2	0	1	X	8
Prince Edward Island (Jay)	0	1	0	0	0	2	0	X	3

Sheet 3	1	2	3	4	5	6	7	8	Final
Nova Scotia (Stone)	0	0	2	0	0	1	0	0	3
British Columbia (Guignard)	0	2	0	0	1	0	0	1	4

Sheet 4	1	2	3	4	5	6	7	8	Final
Manitoba (Wasylik)	2	0	1	2	0	1	0	1	7
New Brunswick (Lacey)	0	2	0	0	2	0	1	0	5

Sheet 5	1	2	3	4	5	6	7	8	Final
Quebec (Brabant)	0	1	2	0	2	0	1	X	6
Saskatchewan (Shutra)	1	0	0	1	0	1	0	X	3

Sheet 6	1	2	3	4	5	6	7	8	Final
Northwest Territories (Delorey)	1	0	2	0	0	0	2	X	5
Northern Ontario (Johnston)	0	6	0	1	0	1	0	X	8

==== Draw 7 ====
Wednesday, November 20, 10:00 am

Sheet 1	1	2	3	4	5	6	7	8	Final
Quebec (Brabant)	3	0	1	0	4	1	X	X	9
Nunavut (Kingdon)	0	0	0	1	0	0	X	X	1

Sheet 3	1	2	3	4	5	6	7	8	Final
Northwest Territories (Delorey)	0	0	0	1	0	0	1	X	2
Saskatchewan (Shutra)	1	1	1	0	2	1	0	X	6

Sheet 5	1	2	3	4	5	6	7	8	Final
Nova Scotia (Stone)	2	0	1	0	2	2	0	X	7
Northern Ontario (Johnston)	0	0	0	2	0	0	1	X	3

==== Draw 8 ====
Wednesday, November 20, 2:30 pm

Sheet 1	1	2	3	4	5	6	7	8	Final
New Brunswick (Lacey)	2	0	0	3	1	3	X	X	9
Yukon (Fecteau)	0	0	0	0	0	0	X	X	0

Sheet 3	1	2	3	4	5	6	7	8	Final
Newfoundland and Labrador (Turpin)	0	2	0	2	0	1	0	X	5
Ontario (Keon)	3	0	2	0	2	0	3	X	10

Sheet 5	1	2	3	4	5	6	7	8	Final
Alberta (Johnson)	1	2	0	3	1	1	X	X	8
Manitoba (Wasylik)	0	0	1	0	0	0	X	X	1

==== Draw 9 ====
Wednesday, November 20, 7:00 pm

Sheet 2	1	2	3	4	5	6	7	8	Final
Nunavut (Kingdon)	0	1	0	0	0	1	X	X	2
Northwest Territories (Delorey)	2	0	4	2	2	0	X	X	10

Sheet 4	1	2	3	4	5	6	7	8	Final
Saskatchewan (Shutra)	2	0	2	0	2	0	0	0	6
Nova Scotia (Stone)	0	4	0	2	0	1	0	4	11

Sheet 6	1	2	3	4	5	6	7	8	Final
British Columbia (Guignard)	0	0	0	1	0	1	1	X	3
Quebec (Brabant)	0	1	3	0	4	0	0	X	8

==== Draw 10 ====
Thursday, November 21, 10:00 am

Sheet 1	1	2	3	4	5	6	7	8	Final
Prince Edward Island (Jay)	0	1	1	0	0	0	0	X	2
Manitoba (Wasylik)	2	0	0	2	1	0	4	X	9

Sheet 3	1	2	3	4	5	6	7	8	Final
Yukon (Fecteau)	1	0	0	0	0	0	2	0	3
Alberta (Johnson)	0	1	1	0	0	3	0	1	6

Sheet 5	1	2	3	4	5	6	7	8	Final
New Brunswick (Lacey)	2	1	0	2	3	0	X	X	8
Newfoundland and Labrador (Turpin)	0	0	1	0	0	0	X	X	1

==== Draw 11 ====
Thursday, November 21, 2:30 pm

Sheet 2	1	2	3	4	5	6	7	8	Final
Northern Ontario (Johnston)	2	0	1	0	6	0	2	X	11
British Columbia (Guignard)	0	1	0	2	0	2	0	X	5

Sheet 4	1	2	3	4	5	6	7	8	Final
Northwest Territories (Delorey)	0	2	0	1	0	0	0	X	3
Quebec (Brabant)	1	0	1	0	2	4	2	X	10

Sheet 6	1	2	3	4	5	6	7	8	Final
Saskatchewan (Shutra)	5	2	0	0	2	0	3	X	12
Nunavut (Kingdon)	0	0	1	1	0	1	0	X	3

==== Draw 12 ====
Thursday, November 21, 7:00 pm

Sheet 2	1	2	3	4	5	6	7	8	Final
New Brunswick (Lacey)	0	2	0	1	1	0	2	0	6
Ontario (Keon)	2	0	3	0	0	1	0	2	8

Sheet 4	1	2	3	4	5	6	7	8	Final
Newfoundland and Labrador (Turpin)	1	1	0	0	0	3	0	1	6
Alberta (Johnson)	0	0	0	0	4	0	3	0	7

Sheet 6	1	2	3	4	5	6	7	8	Final
Yukon (Fecteau)	0	1	0	0	0	1	2	2	6
Prince Edward Island (Jay)	0	0	1	1	0	0	0	0	2

==== Draw 13 ====
Friday, November 22, 10:00 am

Sheet 1	1	2	3	4	5	6	7	8	Final
Nova Scotia (Stone)	0	0	3	0	1	4	3	X	11
Northwest Territories (Delorey)	0	2	0	0	0	0	0	X	2

Sheet 3	1	2	3	4	5	6	7	8	Final
Northern Ontario (Johnston)	0	5	0	1	0	0	2	X	8
Quebec (Brabant)	3	0	1	0	0	1	0	X	5

Sheet 5	1	2	3	4	5	6	7	8	Final
Nunavut (Kingdon)	1	0	0	0	2	0	0	X	3
British Columbia (Guignard)	0	4	1	1	0	0	2	X	8

==== Draw 14 ====
Friday, November 22, 2:30 pm

Sheet 2	1	2	3	4	5	6	7	8	Final
Manitoba (Wasylik)	0	2	0	1	0	5	4	X	12
Yukon (Fecteau)	0	0	2	0	3	0	0	X	5

Sheet 4	1	2	3	4	5	6	7	8	Final
Ontario (Keon)	0	2	1	0	1	0	0	0	4
Prince Edward Island (Jay)	1	0	0	1	0	0	1	0	3

Sheet 6	1	2	3	4	5	6	7	8	Final
Alberta (Johnson)	0	2	0	1	0	1	0	1	5
New Brunswick (Lacey)	0	0	1	0	1	0	1	0	3

=== Championship round ===
==== A Bracket ====
Qualifier 1
A1	Ontario	7
B4	British Columbia	5
A1	Ontario	11
A2	Alberta	5
A2	Alberta	6
B3	Quebec	4

Qualifier 2
B1	Nova Scotia	4
A4	New Brunswick	8
A4	New Brunswick	7
A3	Manitoba	8
B2	Northern Ontario	1
A3	Manitoba	5

==== B Bracket ====
			Qualifier 3
			A2	Alberta	8
B4	British Columbia	6	B3	Quebec	9
B3	Quebec	7

			Qualifier 4
			A4	New Brunswick	8
B1	Nova Scotia	4	B2	Northern Ontario	9
B2	Northern Ontario	6

==== A Event ====
===== Semifinals =====
Friday, November 22, 7:00 pm

Sheet 1	1	2	3	4	5	6	7	8	Final
Northern Ontario (Johnston)	0	0	0	0	0	0	1	X	1
Manitoba (Wasylik)	1	2	1	0	0	1	0	X	5

Sheet 2	1	2	3	4	5	6	7	8	Final
Alberta (Johnson)	0	1	0	0	0	2	2	1	6
Quebec (Brabant)	1	0	1	1	1	0	0	0	4

Sheet 3	1	2	3	4	5	6	7	8	Final
Ontario (Keon)	3	0	0	2	0	2	0	X	7
British Columbia (Guignard)	0	1	0	0	2	0	2	X	5

Saturday, November 23, 10:00 am

Sheet 6	1	2	3	4	5	6	7	8	Final
Nova Scotia (Stone)	0	1	0	0	0	0	3	0	4
New Brunswick (Lacey)	1	0	1	2	2	1	0	1	8

===== Finals =====
Saturday, November 23, 10:00 am

Sheet 5	1	2	3	4	5	6	7	8	Final
Ontario (Keon)	5	0	0	2	3	0	1	X	11
Alberta (Johnson)	0	2	2	0	0	1	0	X	5

Saturday, November 23, 2:30 pm

Sheet 3	1	2	3	4	5	6	7	8	9	Final
New Brunswick (Lacey)	2	0	1	0	0	1	0	3	0	7
Manitoba (Wasylik)	0	1	0	4	0	0	2	0	1	8

==== B Event ====
===== Semifinals =====
Saturday, November 23, 10:00 am

Sheet 4	1	2	3	4	5	6	7	8	9	Final
British Columbia (Guignard)	0	0	2	0	1	2	0	1	0	6
Quebec (Brabant)	2	1	0	1	0	0	2	0	1	7

Saturday, November 23, 2:30 pm

Sheet 1	1	2	3	4	5	6	7	8	Final
Nova Scotia (Stone)	0	1	1	0	1	0	1	X	4
Northern Ontario (Johnston)	1	0	0	2	0	3	0	X	6

===== Finals =====
Saturday, November 23, 7:00 pm

Sheet 2	1	2	3	4	5	6	7	8	Final
New Brunswick (Lacey)	3	0	1	0	2	0	2	0	8
Northern Ontario (Johnston)	0	3	0	1	0	1	0	4	9

Sheet 4	1	2	3	4	5	6	7	8	Final
Alberta (Johnson)	0	2	0	2	0	2	2	0	8
Quebec (Brabant)	5	0	1	0	3	0	0	0	9

=== Playoffs ===
Semifinals
Q1	Ontario	7
Q4	Northern Ontario	5
Q2	Manitoba	6
Q3	Quebec	5

Gold medal game
Q1	Ontario	7
Q2	Manitoba	3
Bronze medal game
Q4	Northern Ontario	9
Q3	Quebec	5

==== Semifinals ====
Sunday, November 24, 9:00 am

Sheet 1	1	2	3	4	5	6	7	8	Final
Manitoba (Wasylik)	0	1	0	1	0	0	1	3	6
Quebec (Brabant)	0	0	1	0	3	1	0	0	5

Sheet 2	1	2	3	4	5	6	7	8	Final
Ontario (Keon)	1	2	1	0	0	2	0	1	7
Northern Ontario (Johnston)	0	0	0	1	1	0	3	0	5

==== Bronze medal game ====
Sunday, November 24, 2:00 pm

Sheet 5	1	2	3	4	5	6	7	8	Final
Northern Ontario (Johnston)	1	0	0	2	3	3	0	X	9
Quebec (Brabant)	0	0	3	0	0	0	2	X	5

==== Gold medal game ====
Sunday, November 24, 2:00 pm

Sheet 3	1	2	3	4	5	6	7	8	Final
Ontario (Keon)	3	0	0	0	1	0	3	X	7
Manitoba (Wasylik)	0	1	1	0	0	1	0	X	3

== Women ==
=== Teams ===
The teams are listed as follows:

Team	Skip	Third	Second	Lead	Alternate	Club
Alberta	Tiffany Steuber	Brittany Martin	Lisa Miller	Cindy Westgard		Thistle CC, Edmonton
British Columbia	Lori Olsen	Tiffany Olsen	Madi Penttila	Lisa Robitaille	Leanne Andrews	Kamloops CC, Kamloops
Manitoba	Deb McCreanor	Trisha Hill	Michelle Buchanan	Jennifer Cawson		La Salle CC, La Salle
New Brunswick	Carol Webb	Heather Munn	Michaela Downey	Kim Dow	Kerkeslin MacDonald	Thistle-St. Andrews CC, Saint John
Newfoundland and Labrador	Susan Curtis	Donna Davis	Amy Fitzpatrick	Michelle Graveline	Amanda Young	Corner Brook CC, Corner Brook
Northern Ontario	Kim Beaudry	Barb Roy	Victoria Beaudry	Taylor Sopotiuck		Fort Frances CC, Fort Frances
Northwest Territories	Sarah Stroeder	Anneli Jokela	Tara Naugler	Nicole Goodman		Yellowknife CC, Yellowknife
Nova Scotia	Michelle Armstrong	Julie McEvoy	Abby Miller	Kathleen Porter	Mary Mason	Lakeshore CC, Lower Sackville
Nunavut	Leigh Gustafson	Martha Lenio	Mayah Obadia	Jill Billingham		Iqaluit CC, Iqaluit
Ontario	Patricia Bandurka	Leta Greer	Meredith Czaniecki	Stephanie Bandurka	Charlene Durant	Dixie CC, Mississauga
Prince Edward Island	Amanda Power	Sara Spafford	Emily Best	Janique LeBlanc		Cornwall CC, Cornwall
Quebec	Gabrielle Lavoie	Patricia Boudreault	Roxane Poirier	Marie-Ève Boudreault	Claudy Daoust	CC Victoria, Ville de Québec
Saskatchewan	Samantha Yachiw-Omelian	Amanda Bell	Kenzie Derdall	Renae Sotnikow	Kimberley Breckner	Sutherland CC, Saskatoon
Yukon	Shannon Lachance	Patsy Cashin	Earleen Fields	Grace Wheeler	Shari Wrixon	Carmacks CC, Carmacks

=== Round-robin standings ===
Final Round Robin Standings

Key
Teams to Championship Round

Pool A	Skip	W	L	W-L	LSD
Saskatchewan	Samantha Yachiw-Omelian	5	1	–	791.9
Quebec	Gabrielle Lavoie	4	2	2–0	626.3
Ontario	Patricia Bandurka	4	2	1–1	1008.4
Newfoundland and Labrador	Susan Curtis	4	2	0–2	474.2
Alberta	Tiffany Steuber	2	4	1–0	918.8
British Columbia	Lori Olsen	2	4	0–1	1167.5
Northwest Territories	Sarah Stroeder	0	6	–	818.3

Pool B	Skip	W	L	W-L	LSD
Prince Edward Island	Amanda Power	6	0	–	701.0
Manitoba	Deb McCreanor	4	2	1–0	923.2
Nova Scotia	Michelle Armstrong	4	2	0–1	410.0
Northern Ontario	Kim Beaudry	3	3	1–0	1255.1
New Brunswick	Carol Webb	3	3	0–1	571.7
Nunavut	Leigh Gustafson	1	5	–	1125.5
Yukon	Shannon Lachance	0	6	–	1952.5

=== Round-robin results ===
All draws are listed in Eastern Time (UTC−05:00).

==== Draw 1 ====
Monday, November 18, 3:30 pm

Sheet 1	1	2	3	4	5	6	7	8	Final
Northwest Territories (Stroeder)	0	0	0	0	2	0	1	0	3
Newfoundland and Labrador (Curtis)	0	0	1	1	0	1	0	1	4

Sheet 2	1	2	3	4	5	6	7	8	Final
Nova Scotia (Armstrong)	1	0	2	2	3	0	0	X	8
Yukon (Lachance)	0	2	0	0	0	1	1	X	4

Sheet 3	1	2	3	4	5	6	7	8	Final
Ontario (Bandurka)	0	0	0	1	0	1	1	X	3
Quebec (Lavoie)	1	2	0	0	3	0	0	X	6

Sheet 4	1	2	3	4	5	6	7	8	Final
Northern Ontario (Beaudry)	1	0	0	1	0	0	X	X	2
Prince Edward Island (Power)	0	5	1	0	3	2	X	X	11

Sheet 5	1	2	3	4	5	6	7	8	Final
Saskatchewan (Yachiw-Omelian)	0	2	1	0	2	0	1	2	8
Alberta (Steuber)	2	0	0	2	0	1	0	0	5

Sheet 6	1	2	3	4	5	6	7	8	Final
Nunavut (Gustafson)	0	1	0	0	1	0	1	X	3
Manitoba (McCreanor)	2	0	2	2	0	2	0	X	8

==== Draw 3 ====
Tuesday, November 19, 9:00 am

Sheet 1	1	2	3	4	5	6	7	8	Final
Northern Ontario (Beaudry)	0	0	1	0	0	0	X	X	1
Nova Scotia (Armstrong)	1	4	0	0	2	2	X	X	9

Sheet 2	1	2	3	4	5	6	7	8	Final
New Brunswick (Webb)	0	0	0	3	1	0	0	2	6
Manitoba (McCreanor)	0	0	1	0	0	1	1	0	3

Sheet 3	1	2	3	4	5	6	7	8	Final
Saskatchewan (Yachiw-Omelian)	0	0	2	0	0	3	0	2	7
British Columbia (Olsen)	2	0	0	1	1	0	1	0	5

Sheet 4	1	2	3	4	5	6	7	8	9	Final
Yukon (Lachance)	0	0	2	0	2	0	0	2	0	6
Nunavut (Gustafson)	1	1	0	2	0	1	1	0	1	7

Sheet 5	1	2	3	4	5	6	7	8	Final
Ontario (Bandurka)	2	1	0	1	0	2	1	X	7
Northwest Territories (Stroeder)	0	0	2	0	1	0	0	X	3

Sheet 6	1	2	3	4	5	6	7	8	Final
Quebec (Lavoie)	0	0	1	1	1	0	1	1	5
Newfoundland and Labrador (Curtis)	2	1	0	0	0	1	0	0	4

==== Draw 5 ====
Tuesday, November 19, 4:00 pm

Sheet 1	1	2	3	4	5	6	7	8	9	Final
Alberta (Steuber)	0	0	0	2	0	1	2	0	0	5
Ontario (Bandurka)	1	0	1	0	1	0	0	2	2	7

Sheet 2	1	2	3	4	5	6	7	8	Final
Newfoundland and Labrador (Curtis)	0	1	2	1	0	1	1	1	7
Saskatchewan (Yachiw-Omelian)	2	0	0	0	2	0	0	0	4

Sheet 3	1	2	3	4	5	6	7	8	Final
Manitoba (McCreanor)	0	1	0	1	0	0	0	2	4
Northern Ontario (Beaudry)	0	0	1	0	0	0	1	0	2

Sheet 4	1	2	3	4	5	6	7	8	Final
Quebec (Lavoie)	0	0	1	0	1	0	0	X	2
British Columbia (Olsen)	1	0	0	0	0	2	2	X	5

Sheet 5	1	2	3	4	5	6	7	8	Final
New Brunswick (Webb)	0	3	0	1	0	3	1	0	8
Nova Scotia (Armstrong)	3	0	5	0	2	0	0	1	11

Sheet 6	1	2	3	4	5	6	7	8	Final
Prince Edward Island (Power)	1	1	0	1	5	5	X	X	13
Yukon (Lachance)	0	0	2	0	0	0	X	X	2

==== Draw 7 ====
Wednesday, November 20, 10:00 am

Sheet 2	1	2	3	4	5	6	7	8	Final
Quebec (Lavoie)	0	0	0	1	0	1	0	3	5
Northwest Territories (Stroeder)	0	1	1	0	1	0	1	0	4

Sheet 4	1	2	3	4	5	6	7	8	Final
Ontario (Bandurka)	0	0	0	3	0	1	0	X	4
Saskatchewan (Yachiw-Omelian)	2	2	3	0	2	0	1	X	10

Sheet 6	1	2	3	4	5	6	7	8	Final
Alberta (Steuber)	1	0	2	0	1	1	0	3	8
British Columbia (Olsen)	0	1	0	2	0	0	3	0	6

==== Draw 8 ====
Wednesday, November 20, 2:30 pm

Sheet 2	1	2	3	4	5	6	7	8	Final
Nunavut (Gustafson)	0	1	1	0	0	1	X	X	3
Prince Edward Island (Power)	5	0	0	6	3	0	X	X	14

Sheet 4	1	2	3	4	5	6	7	8	Final
Nova Scotia (Armstrong)	2	0	1	0	0	1	0	X	4
Manitoba (McCreanor)	0	1	0	1	3	0	4	X	9

Sheet 6	1	2	3	4	5	6	7	8	Final
Northern Ontario (Beaudry)	0	2	0	1	1	1	0	1	6
New Brunswick (Webb)	0	0	2	0	0	0	1	0	3

==== Draw 9 ====
Wednesday, November 20, 7:00 pm

Sheet 1	1	2	3	4	5	6	7	8	Final
British Columbia (Olsen)	5	1	1	2	0	1	X	X	10
Northwest Territories (Stroeder)	0	0	0	0	2	0	X	X	2

Sheet 3	1	2	3	4	5	6	7	8	Final
Newfoundland and Labrador (Curtis)	3	0	2	1	2	0	0	0	8
Ontario (Bandurka)	0	5	0	0	0	2	2	1	10

Sheet 5	1	2	3	4	5	6	7	8	Final
Alberta (Steuber)	0	0	0	0	0	2	2	0	4
Quebec (Lavoie)	1	0	1	1	3	0	0	1	7

==== Draw 10 ====
Thursday, November 21, 10:00 am

Sheet 2	1	2	3	4	5	6	7	8	Final
Yukon (Lachance)	0	0	0	0	1	0	X	X	1
Northern Ontario (Beaudry)	2	1	2	3	0	4	X	X	12

Sheet 4	1	2	3	4	5	6	7	8	Final
Prince Edward Island (Power)	1	0	2	0	3	1	0	X	7
New Brunswick (Webb)	0	1	0	1	0	0	1	X	3

Sheet 6	1	2	3	4	5	6	7	8	Final
Nova Scotia (Armstrong)	1	0	2	4	0	2	0	X	9
Nunavut (Gustafson)	0	1	0	0	1	0	1	X	3

==== Draw 11 ====
Thursday, November 21, 2:30 pm

Sheet 1	1	2	3	4	5	6	7	8	Final
Saskatchewan (Yachiw-Omelian)	0	0	3	0	1	1	1	X	6
Quebec (Lavoie)	1	1	0	1	0	0	0	X	3

Sheet 3	1	2	3	4	5	6	7	8	Final
Northwest Territories (Stroeder)	1	2	1	0	0	1	0	0	5
Alberta (Steuber)	0	0	0	1	3	0	0	3	7

Sheet 5	1	2	3	4	5	6	7	8	Final
British Columbia (Olsen)	0	0	1	2	2	0	1	0	6
Newfoundland and Labrador (Curtis)	0	3	0	0	0	3	0	1	7

==== Draw 12 ====
Thursday, November 21, 7:00 pm

Sheet 1	1	2	3	4	5	6	7	8	Final
Manitoba (McCreanor)	0	0	1	0	2	0	0	X	3
Prince Edward Island (Power)	0	1	0	3	0	1	2	X	7

Sheet 3	1	2	3	4	5	6	7	8	Final
Yukon (Lachance)	0	0	0	0	0	1	X	X	1
New Brunswick (Webb)	3	1	3	2	3	0	X	X	12

Sheet 5	1	2	3	4	5	6	7	8	Final
Nunavut (Gustafson)	1	0	0	0	0	0	0	X	1
Northern Ontario (Beaudry)	0	3	1	1	1	1	3	X	10

==== Draw 13 ====
Friday, November 22, 10:00 am

Sheet 2	1	2	3	4	5	6	7	8	Final
British Columbia (Olsen)	0	0	2	1	0	0	0	X	3
Ontario (Bandurka)	1	2	0	0	2	3	1	X	9

Sheet 4	1	2	3	4	5	6	7	8	Final
Newfoundland and Labrador (Curtis)	0	1	0	3	0	2	0	1	7
Alberta (Steuber)	0	0	0	0	3	0	1	0	4

Sheet 6	1	2	3	4	5	6	7	8	Final
Northwest Territories (Stroeder)	0	0	2	0	0	1	0	0	3
Saskatchewan (Yachiw-Omelian)	1	2	0	0	1	0	1	1	6

==== Draw 14 ====
Friday, November 22, 2:30 pm

Sheet 1	1	2	3	4	5	6	7	8	Final
New Brunswick (Webb)	1	1	2	5	1	3	X	X	13
Nunavut (Gustafson)	0	0	0	0	0	0	X	X	0

Sheet 3	1	2	3	4	5	6	7	8	Final
Prince Edward Island (Power)	0	2	1	0	0	2	0	2	7
Nova Scotia (Armstrong)	0	0	0	1	1	0	2	0	4

Sheet 5	1	2	3	4	5	6	7	8	Final
Manitoba (McCreanor)	0	1	0	3	1	3	0	X	8
Yukon (Lachance)	2	0	1	0	0	0	1	X	4

=== Championship round ===
==== A Bracket ====
Qualifier 1
A1	Saskatchewan	3
B4	Northern Ontario	5
B4	Northern Ontario	3
B3	Nova Scotia	5
A2	Quebec	4
B3	Nova Scotia	6

Qualifier 2
B1	Prince Edward Island	9
A4	Newfoundland and Labrador	2
B1	Prince Edward Island	8
A3	Ontario	1
B2	Manitoba	5
A3	Ontario	6

==== B Bracket ====
			Qualifier 3
			B4	Northern Ontario	7
A1	Saskatchewan	3	A2	Quebec	8
A2	Quebec	6

			Qualifier 4
			A3	Ontario	4
A4	Newfoundland and Labrador	4	B2	Manitoba	5
B2	Manitoba	5

==== A Event ====
===== Semifinals =====
Friday, November 22, 7:00 pm

Sheet 4	1	2	3	4	5	6	7	8	Final
Saskatchewan (Yachiw-Omelian)	1	0	0	0	1	0	1	0	3
Northern Ontario (Beaudry)	0	1	1	0	0	1	0	2	5

Sheet 5	1	2	3	4	5	6	7	8	Final
Manitoba (McCreanor)	1	0	0	0	2	0	2	0	5
Ontario (Bandurka)	0	1	1	0	0	3	0	1	6

Sheet 6	1	2	3	4	5	6	7	8	Final
Quebec (Lavoie)	0	1	0	2	1	0	0	X	4
Nova Scotia (Armstrong)	1	0	1	0	0	2	2	X	6

Saturday, November 23, 10:00 am

Sheet 2	1	2	3	4	5	6	7	8	Final
Prince Edward Island (Power)	1	2	0	2	0	4	X	X	9
Newfoundland and Labrador (Curtis)	0	0	0	0	2	0	X	X	2

===== Finals =====
Saturday, November 23, 10:00 am

Sheet 1	1	2	3	4	5	6	7	8	Final
Northern Ontario (Beaudry)	1	0	1	0	0	0	0	1	3
Nova Scotia (Armstrong)	0	0	0	2	1	1	1	0	5

Saturday, November 23, 2:30 pm

Sheet 2	1	2	3	4	5	6	7	8	Final
Prince Edward Island (Power)	3	0	1	2	1	1	X	X	8
Ontario (Bandurka)	0	1	0	0	0	0	X	X	1

==== B Event ====
===== Semifinals =====
Saturday, November 23, 10:00 am

Sheet 3	1	2	3	4	5	6	7	8	Final
Saskatchewan (Yachiw-Omelian)	0	0	0	0	0	3	0	X	3
Quebec (Lavoie)	1	0	1	1	2	0	1	X	6

Saturday, November 23, 2:30 pm

Sheet 4	1	2	3	4	5	6	7	8	9	Final
Newfoundland and Labrador (Curtis)	0	0	1	0	1	0	1	1	0	4
Manitoba (McCreanor)	1	1	0	1	0	1	0	0	1	5

===== Finals =====
Saturday, November 23, 7:00 pm

Sheet 1	1	2	3	4	5	6	7	8	Final
Northern Ontario (Beaudry)	1	0	5	1	0	0	0	0	7
Quebec (Lavoie)	0	1	0	0	2	2	2	1	8

Sheet 3	1	2	3	4	5	6	7	8	9	Final
Ontario (Bandurka)	1	1	0	1	0	0	0	1	0	4
Manitoba (McCreanor)	0	0	1	0	1	1	1	0	1	5

=== Playoffs ===
Semifinals
Q1	Nova Scotia	9
Q4	Manitoba	8
Q2	Prince Edward Island	8
Q3	Quebec	5

Gold medal game
Q1	Nova Scotia	10
Q2	Prince Edward Island	9
Bronze medal game
Q4	Manitoba	6
Q3	Quebec	5

==== Semifinals ====
Sunday, November 24, 9:00 am

Sheet 3	1	2	3	4	5	6	7	8	Final
Prince Edward Island (Power)	1	0	2	0	2	0	2	1	8
Quebec (Lavoie)	0	3	0	1	0	1	0	0	5

Sheet 5	1	2	3	4	5	6	7	8	Final
Nova Scotia (Armstrong)	2	1	0	2	0	3	0	1	9
Manitoba (McCreanor)	0	0	1	0	3	0	4	0	8

==== Bronze medal game ====
Sunday, November 24, 2:00 pm

Sheet 3	1	2	3	4	5	6	7	8	Final
Manitoba (McCreanor)	0	0	0	1	1	1	0	3	6
Quebec (Lavoie)	1	0	2	0	0	0	2	0	5

==== Gold medal game ====
Sunday, November 24, 2:00 pm

Sheet 1	1	2	3	4	5	6	7	8	9	Final
Nova Scotia (Armstrong)	0	1	0	2	0	4	2	0	1	10
Prince Edward Island (Power)	3	0	3	0	2	0	0	1	0	9
