= 2011 The Dominion Curling Club Championship =

Canadian national curling championship edition

- Host city: Richmond, British Columbia
- Arena: Richmond Curling Club
- Dates: November 21–26
- Men's winner: Alberta
- Curling club: Red Deer CC, Red Deer
- Skip: Wade Thurber
- Third: Harvey Kelts
- Second: Rick Hjertaas
- Lead: Eldon Raab
- Finalist: Ontario (Greg Balsdon)
- Women's winner: Manitoba
- Curling club: Granite CC, Winnipeg
- Skip: Meghan Armit
- Third: Nikki Hawrylyshen
- Second: Sarah Lund
- Lead: Nadine Cabak Ralph
- Finalist: Ontario (Jodi McCutcheon)

The 2011 Dominion Curling Club Championship was held from November 21 to 26 at the Richmond Curling Club in Richmond, British Columbia. The third edition of the Dominion Curling Club Championship featured men's and women's teams from clubs all across Canada.

== Women ==
=== Teams ===
Skip	Third	Second	Lead	Locale
Kendra Nakagama	Jinaye Ayrey	Jennifer Colwell	Shauna Ferby	(Alberta) Lethbridge CC
Deb Goodwin	Lonnie Schopp	Kim Jonsson	Lori Ross	(British Columbia) Comox Valley CC
Meghan Armit	Nikki Hawrylyshen	Sarah Lund	Nadine Cabak Ralph	(Manitoba) Granite CC
Shannon Williams	Lucille Savoie	Shelley Thomas	Lynn LeBlanc	(New Brunswick) Beausejour CC
Melanie Patry	Christine Dubuc	Nicole Dubuc-Charbonneau	Bryna Gaudette	(Ontario) Coniston CC (NO)
Jodi McCutcheon	Joanne McMichael	Jeni Mah	Kelly Williams	(Ontario) High Park Club
Frankie Amos	Tricia Schmeisser	Cheryl Mallett-Skelton	Karen Langlois	(Nova Scotia) Mayflower CC
Kristy Frampton	Geneva Chislett	Penny Dominix-Nadeau	Robyn Mackey	(Nunavut) Iqaluit CC
Diane Baxter	Stephanie Crocker	Marjorie Baetz	Leah Bishop	(Northwest Territories) Inuvik CC
Lorianne Davies	Melody Beck	Tracy Macdonald	Lynda Trumbull	(Prince Edward Island) Cornwall CC
Sylvye Turgeon	Carole Cyr	France Prévost	Suzanne Desloges	(Quebec) CC Laval
Patricia Yeske	Danielle Sicinski	Pamela Clothier	Leslie Glova	(Saskatchewan) Hillcrest CC
Pam Osborne	Patricia Tiller	Tina Horlick	Barb Dawson	(Newfoundland and Labrador) Remax CC
Sherry MacInnis	Bev Murphy	JoAnne Snobelen	Janis Harper	(Yukon) Atlin CC (BC)

=== Round-robin standings ===
Final round-robin standings

Key
Teams to Playoffs
Teams to Tiebreakers

Blue Pool	Skip	W	L
Manitoba	Meghan Armit	5	1
Northern Ontario	Melanie Patry	5	1
Alberta	Kendra Nakagama	4	2
New Brunswick	Shannon Williams	4	2
British Columbia	Deb Goodwin	2	4
Northwest Territories	Diane Baxter	1	5
Yukon	Sherry MacInnis	0	6

Grey Pool	Skip	W	L
Ontario	Jodi McCutcheon	6	0
Saskatchewan	Patricia Yeske	4	2
Quebec	Sylvye Turgeon	4	2
Newfoundland and Labrador	Pam Osborne	3	3
Nova Scotia	Frankie Amos	2	4
Prince Edward Island	Lorianne Davies	1	5
Nunavut	Kristy Frampton	1	5

=== Round-robin results ===
==== Draw 2 ====
Tuesday, November 22, 1:30 pm

Sheet 1	1	2	3	4	5	6	7	8	Final
British Columbia (Goodwin)	0	0	0	2	0	1	0	2	5
Manitoba (Armit) 🔨	0	2	0	0	3	0	1	0	6

Sheet 2	1	2	3	4	5	6	7	8	Final
Yukon (MacInnis)	0	0	1	0	1	0	X	X	2
Alberta (Nakagama) 🔨	1	2	0	6	0	5	X	X	14

Sheet 3	1	2	3	4	5	6	7	8	Final
Northern Ontario (Patry)	0	0	4	1	0	1	0	X	6
New Brunswick (Williams) 🔨	0	0	0	0	2	0	1	X	3

Sheet 4	1	2	3	4	5	6	7	8	9	Final
Quebec (Turgeon)	0	1	0	0	1	0	0	3	1	6
Saskatchewan (Yeske) 🔨	0	0	0	2	0	0	3	0	0	5

Sheet 5	1	2	3	4	5	6	7	8	Final
Nunavut (Frampton) 🔨	0	1	0	1	0	1	0	X	3
Ontario (McCutcheon)	3	0	3	0	2	0	1	X	9

Sheet 6	1	2	3	4	5	6	7	8	Final
Nova Scotia (Amos)	0	0	1	0	0	0	4	0	5
Newfoundland and Labrador (Osborne) 🔨	0	0	0	2	2	1	0	1	6

Northwest Territories and Prince Edward Island receive byes this round.

==== Draw 4 ====
Tuesday, November 22, 8:15 pm

Sheet 1	1	2	3	4	5	6	7	8	Final
Nova Scotia (Amos) 🔨	0	0	0	1	1	0	3	0	5
Ontario (McCutcheon)	2	1	1	0	0	1	0	1	6

Sheet 2	1	2	3	4	5	6	7	8	Final
Prince Edward Island (Davies)	1	0	3	0	0	0	0	X	4
Quebec (Turgeon) 🔨	0	2	0	1	0	1	2	X	6

Sheet 3	1	2	3	4	5	6	7	8	Final
Saskatchewan (Yeske) 🔨	2	1	0	0	0	3	0	X	6
Nunavut (Frampton)	0	0	0	1	1	0	1	X	3

Sheet 4	1	2	3	4	5	6	7	8	Final
Northern Ontario (Patry) 🔨	2	0	0	0	1	0	2	X	5
Alberta (Nakagama)	0	0	2	1	0	1	0	X	4

Sheet 5	1	2	3	4	5	6	7	8	Final
Northwest Territories (Baxter)	0	1	0	1	0	0	0	0	2
British Columbia (Goodwin) 🔨	4	0	3	0	1	1	1	1	11

Sheet 6	1	2	3	4	5	6	7	8	Final
Manitoba (Armit) 🔨	3	3	0	4	3	3	X	X	16
Yukon (MacInnis)	0	0	2	0	0	0	X	X	2

New Brunswick and Newfoundland and Labrador receive byes this round.

==== Draw 5 ====
Wednesday, November 23, 10:00 am

Sheet 1	1	2	3	4	5	6	7	8	Final
Northwest Territories (Baxter) 🔨	0	1	1	2	3	1	X	X	8
Yukon (MacInnis)	1	0	0	0	0	0	X	X	1

Sheet 2	1	2	3	4	5	6	7	8	Final
Manitoba (Armit) 🔨	0	0	1	0	2	0	2	1	6
Northern Ontario (Patry)	0	0	0	1	0	2	0	0	3

Sheet 3	1	2	3	4	5	6	7	8	Final
Newfoundland and Labrador (Osborne) 🔨	0	1	0	0	0	X	X	X	1
Ontario (McCutcheon)	2	0	4	3	2	X	X	X	11

Sheet 4	1	2	3	4	5	6	7	8	Final
Prince Edward Island (Davies) 🔨	2	0	1	0	3	1	2	X	9
Nunavut (Frampton)	0	1	0	2	0	0	0	X	3

Sheet 5	1	2	3	4	5	6	7	8	Final
New Brunswick (Williams)	0	0	1	0	1	0	0	X	2
Alberta (Nakagama) 🔨	1	3	0	1	0	0	2	X	7

Sheet 6	1	2	3	4	5	6	7	8	Final
Saskatchewan (Yeske) 🔨	1	0	0	2	0	3	0	X	6
Nova Scotia (Amos)	0	1	1	0	2	0	0	X	4

British Columbia and Quebec receive byes this round.

==== Draw 7 ====
Wednesday, November 23, 4:45 pm

Sheet 1	1	2	3	4	5	6	7	8	Final
Prince Edward Island (Davies)	1	0	1	0	1	0	0	X	3
Saskatchewan (Yeske) 🔨	0	3	0	1	0	3	4	X	11

Sheet 2	1	2	3	4	5	6	7	8	Final
Newfoundland and Labrador (Osborne) 🔨	0	0	0	0	0	0	X	X	0
Nunavut (Frampton)	2	1	1	1	1	1	X	X	7

Sheet 3	1	2	3	4	5	6	7	8	Final
Northwest Territories (Baxter)	1	0	0	0	0	0	X	X	1
Manitoba (Armit) 🔨	0	3	1	3	1	3	X	X	11

Sheet 4	1	2	3	4	5	6	7	8	Final
New Brunswick (Williams) 🔨	4	0	2	0	1	1	2	X	10
Yukon (MacInnis)	0	1	0	2	0	0	0	X	3

Sheet 5	1	2	3	4	5	6	7	8	Final
Ontario (McCutcheon) 🔨	0	2	0	3	0	0	0	1	6
Quebec (Turgeon)	0	0	1	0	1	1	1	0	4

Sheet 6	1	2	3	4	5	6	7	8	9	Final
Alberta (Nakagama) 🔨	0	2	0	2	0	0	1	1	1	7
British Columbia (Goodwin)	3	0	1	0	1	1	0	0	0	6

Northern Ontario and Nova Scotia receive byes this round.

==== Draw 10 ====
Thursday, November 24, 1:30 pm

Sheet 1	1	2	3	4	5	6	7	8	Final
Manitoba (Armit) 🔨	0	0	0	1	0	1	0	X	2
New Brunswick (Williams)	0	1	0	0	2	0	3	X	6

Sheet 2	1	2	3	4	5	6	7	8	9	Final
Nova Scotia (Amos)	2	0	0	1	0	0	0	1	1	5
Prince Edward Island (Davies) 🔨	0	1	1	0	1	1	0	0	0	4

Sheet 3	1	2	3	4	5	6	7	8	Final
Yukon (MacInnis)	0	1	0	0	0	0	X	X	1
British Columbia (Goodwin) 🔨	3	0	3	1	2	1	X	X	10

Sheet 4	1	2	3	4	5	6	7	8	9	Final
Saskatchewan (Yeske)	0	0	2	0	0	0	2	0	2	6
Newfoundland and Labrador (Osborne) 🔨	1	0	0	0	0	2	0	1	0	4

Sheet 5	1	2	3	4	5	6	7	8	Final
Northern Ontario (Patry) 🔨	2	2	0	1	4	0	X	X	9
Northwest Territories (Baxter)	0	0	2	0	0	1	X	X	3

Sheet 6	1	2	3	4	5	6	7	8	Final
Nunavut (Frampton)	0	0	0	0	0	1	X	X	1
Quebec (Turgeon) 🔨	2	2	1	2	3	0	X	X	10

Alberta and Ontario receive byes this round.

==== Draw 12 ====
Thursday, November 24, 8:00 pm

Sheet 1	1	2	3	4	5	6	7	8	Final
Nunavut (Frampton) 🔨	0	0	0	0	X	X	X	X	0
Nova Scotia (Amos)	1	2	2	4	X	X	X	X	9

Sheet 2	1	2	3	4	5	6	7	8	Final
British Columbia (Goodwin)	0	0	2	0	0	0	1	1	4
New Brunswick (Williams) 🔨	2	0	0	2	0	1	0	0	5

Sheet 3	1	2	3	4	5	6	7	8	Final
Alberta (Nakagama) 🔨	1	0	7	0	1	1	X	X	10
Northwest Territories (Baxter)	0	1	0	1	0	0	X	X	2

Sheet 4	1	2	3	4	5	6	7	8	Final
Ontario (McCutcheon) 🔨	1	0	0	1	1	0	3	X	6
Prince Edward Island (Davies)	0	2	1	0	0	1	0	X	4

Sheet 5	1	2	3	4	5	6	7	8	Final
Quebec (Turgeon)	0	0	1	1	0	0	3	0	5
Newfoundland and Labrador (Osborne) 🔨	1	1	0	0	3	0	0	1	6

Sheet 6	1	2	3	4	5	6	7	8	Final
Yukon (MacInnis)	0	1	0	0	0	0	X	X	1
Northern Ontario (Patry) 🔨	4	0	3	2	1	1	X	X	11

Manitoba and Saskatchewan receive byes this round.

==== Draw 13 ====
Friday, November 25, 9:00 am

Sheet 1	1	2	3	4	5	6	7	8	Final
Newfoundland and Labrador (Osborne)	2	0	2	0	1	1	0	0	6
Prince Edward Island (Davies) 🔨	0	3	0	1	0	0	1	0	5

Sheet 2	1	2	3	4	5	6	7	8	Final
Quebec (Turgeon) 🔨	0	3	1	0	0	0	2	0	6
Nova Scotia (Amos)	0	0	0	2	1	1	0	1	5

Sheet 3	1	2	3	4	5	6	7	8	Final
Ontario (McCutcheon)	1	1	0	0	2	0	1	2	7
Saskatchewan (Yeske) 🔨	0	0	1	1	0	3	0	0	5

Sheet 4	1	2	3	4	5	6	7	8	Final
British Columbia (Goodwin)	0	0	1	0	1	0	X	X	2
Northern Ontario (Patry) 🔨	4	1	0	4	0	1	X	X	10

Sheet 5	1	2	3	4	5	6	7	8	Final
Alberta (Nakagama)	0	0	0	0	0	2	0	X	2
Manitoba (Armit) 🔨	0	0	2	1	3	0	1	X	7

Sheet 6	1	2	3	4	5	6	7	8	Final
New Brunswick (Williams) 🔨	0	1	0	7	0	0	X	X	8
Northwest Territories (Baxter)	0	0	2	0	0	0	X	X	2

Yukon and Nunavut receive byes this round.

=== Tiebreaker ===
Friday, November 25, 8:00 pm

Sheet B	1	2	3	4	5	6	7	8	Final
Saskatchewan (Yeske)	0	2	0	0	1	2	0	0	5
Quebec (Turgeon) 🔨	1	0	1	0	0	0	1	0	3

=== Playoffs ===
Semifinal
G1	Ontario	6
B2	Northern Ontario	4
B1	Manitoba	5
G2	Saskatchewan	3

Final
G1	Ontario	6
B1	Manitoba	8

==== Semifinals ====
Saturday, November 26, 9:00 am

Team	1	2	3	4	5	6	7	8	Final
Ontario (McCutcheon) 🔨	1	1	0	2	0	2	0	X	6
Northern Ontario (Patry)	0	0	2	0	1	0	1	X	4

Team	1	2	3	4	5	6	7	8	Final
Saskatchewan (Yeske)	0	0	0	1	0	1	1	X	3
Manitoba (Armit) 🔨	2	0	3	0	0	0	0	X	5

==== Final ====
Saturday, November 26, 2:00 pm

Team	1	2	3	4	5	6	7	8	Final
Ontario (McCutcheon) 🔨	1	0	1	0	4	0	0	0	6
Manitoba (Armit)	0	2	0	3	0	1	1	1	8

== Men ==
=== Teams ===
Skip	Third	Second	Lead	Locale
Wade Thurber	Harvey Kelts	Rick Hjertaas	Eldon Raab	(Alberta) Red Deer CC
Dwight Hodder	Paul Quesnel	Chris Brezina	Gary Farr	(British Columbia) Ashcroft & District CC
Barry Mandryk	Jason Mandryk	Brian Kusmack	Danial Gagné	(Manitoba) Assiniboine Memorial CC
Barry Lewis	Robert LeBlanc	Danny LeBlanc	Jim Hazlehurst	(New Brunswick) Beaver CC
Dale Dubinsky	Bill Midak	Tony Barscello	Rob Dubinsky	(Ontario) Kakabeka Falls CC (NO)
Greg Balsdon	Jordan Keon	Curtis Samoy	Kevin Roberts	(Ontario) Richmond Hill CC
Mel Sittinchinli	Georgie Greenland	Blake Herbert	Conrad Bourque	(Northwest Territories) Inuvik CC
Ed Sattelberger	Dennis Masson	Lee Brenton	Steve Sharpe	(Nunavut) Iqaluit CC
Donald Clarey	Larry Richards	David Rice	Steven MacLeod	(Prince Edward Island) Montague CC
John Monroe	François Bornais	Guy Savard	Jean Arsenault*	(Quebec) CC Jacques-Cartier
Brad Bibby	Steven Thevenot	Ian Schindler	David Schmirler	(Saskatchewan) Prince Albert G&CC
Paul Harvey	Steve Bragg	Mike Morressey	Brian Noseworthy	(Newfoundland and Labrador) Remax Centre
Andrew Atherton	Jose Teixiera	Nathan Reid	Terry Atherton	(Nova Scotia) Chester CC
Scott Hamilton	Walter Wallingham	Ed Kormendy	Curtis Kuzma	(Yukon) Whitehorse CC

*Jean Arsenault replaced Rémi Dutil, who couldn't attend the championship. In the provincial, Dutil played at third, throwing skip stones.

=== Round-robin standings ===
Final round-robin standings

Key
Teams to Playoffs
Teams to Tiebreakers

Blue Pool	Skip	W	L
Alberta	Wade Thurber	5	1
Manitoba	Barry Mandryk	4	2
Northern Ontario	Dale Dubinsky	4	2
Yukon	Scott Hamilton	3	3
British Columbia	Dwight Hodder	3	3
New Brunswick	Barry Lewis	2	4
Northwest Territories	Mel Sittinchinli	0	6

Grey Pool	Skip	W	L
Ontario	Greg Balsdon	6	0
Newfoundland and Labrador	Paul Harvey	5	1
Saskatchewan	Brad Bibby	4	2
Prince Edward Island	Donald Clarey	2	4
Nova Scotia	Andrew Atherton	2	4
Nunavut	Ed Sattelberger	1	5
Quebec	John Monroe	1	5

=== Round-robin results ===
==== Draw 1 ====
Tuesday, November 22, 10:00 am

Sheet 1	1	2	3	4	5	6	7	8	Final
British Columbia (Hodder)	0	2	0	1	0	0	1	0	4
Manitoba (Mandryk) 🔨	2	0	1	0	1	1	0	1	6

Sheet 2	1	2	3	4	5	6	7	8	Final
Yukon (Hamilton) 🔨	0	0	1	0	0	1	0	X	2
Alberta (Thurber)	0	2	0	0	2	0	2	X	6

Sheet 3	1	2	3	4	5	6	7	8	Final
Northern Ontario (Dubinsky)	0	0	0	4	0	0	0	X	4
New Brunswick (Lewis) 🔨	2	0	1	0	3	1	2	X	9

Sheet 4	1	2	3	4	5	6	7	8	Final
Quebec (Monroe) 🔨	2	0	0	0	1	0	1	X	4
Saskatchewan (Bibby)	0	1	1	2	0	4	0	X	8

Sheet 5	1	2	3	4	5	6	7	8	Final
Nunavut (Sattelberger) 🔨	1	0	1	0	0	1	0	X	3
Ontario (Balsdon)	0	1	0	1	1	0	2	X	5

Sheet 6	1	2	3	4	5	6	7	8	Final
Nova Scotia (Atherton)	0	0	0	2	0	1	0	X	3
Newfoundland and Labrador (Harvey) 🔨	0	2	1	0	2	0	1	X	5

Northwest Territories and Prince Edward Island receive byes this round.

==== Draw 3 ====
Tuesday, November 22, 4:45 pm

Sheet 1	1	2	3	4	5	6	7	8	Final
Nova Scotia (Atherton)	0	2	0	1	0	2	X	X	5
Ontario (Balsdon) 🔨	3	0	4	0	3	0	X	X	10

Sheet 2	1	2	3	4	5	6	7	8	Final
Prince Edward Island (Clarey)	0	1	0	2	0	1	1	1	6
Quebec (Monroe) 🔨	1	0	1	0	3	0	0	0	5

Sheet 3	1	2	3	4	5	6	7	8	Final
Saskatchewan (Bibby) 🔨	4	1	0	2	0	1	0	X	8
Nunavut (Sattelberger)	0	0	1	0	1	0	0	X	2

Sheet 4	1	2	3	4	5	6	7	8	Final
Northern Ontario (Dubinsky)	0	1	0	0	3	0	2	0	6
Alberta (Thurber) 🔨	2	0	3	1	0	1	0	1	8

Sheet 5	1	2	3	4	5	6	7	8	Final
Northwest Territories (Sittinchinli)	0	0	2	0	0	3	0	X	5
British Columbia (Hodder) 🔨	3	3	0	3	1	0	2	X	12

Sheet 6	1	2	3	4	5	6	7	8	Final
Manitoba (Mandryk)	1	1	0	2	0	0	0	X	4
Yukon (Hamilton) 🔨	0	0	0	0	0	1	0	X	1

New Brunswick and Newfoundland and Labrador receive byes this round.

==== Draw 6 ====
Wednesday, November 23, 1:30 pm

Sheet 1	1	2	3	4	5	6	7	8	Final
Northwest Territories (Sittinchinli)	0	0	0	1	0	0	1	0	2
Yukon (Hamilton) 🔨	0	0	0	0	1	1	0	2	4

Sheet 2	1	2	3	4	5	6	7	8	Final
Manitoba (Mandryk)	0	1	0	2	0	1	2	X	6
Northern Ontario (Dubinsky) 🔨	2	0	2	0	4	0	0	X	8

Sheet 3	1	2	3	4	5	6	7	8	Final
Newfoundland and Labrador (Harvey) 🔨	0	1	0	1	0	2	1	X	5
Ontario (Balsdon)	1	0	4	0	3	0	0	X	8

Sheet 4	1	2	3	4	5	6	7	8	Final
Prince Edward Island (Clarey) 🔨	0	0	0	1	1	0	0	2	4
Nunavut (Sattelberger)	1	0	0	0	0	1	1	0	3

Sheet 5	1	2	3	4	5	6	7	8	Final
New Brunswick (Lewis)	1	0	0	2	0	0	1	2	6
Alberta (Thurber) 🔨	0	1	1	0	4	1	0	0	7

Sheet 6	1	2	3	4	5	6	7	8	Final
Saskatchewan (Bibby)	0	3	2	1	1	2	X	X	9
Nova Scotia (Atherton) 🔨	3	0	0	0	0	0	X	X	3

British Columbia and Quebec receive byes this round.

==== Draw 8 ====
Wednesday, November 23, 8:00 pm

Sheet 1	1	2	3	4	5	6	7	8	Final
Prince Edward Island (Clarey)	0	0	1	1	0	0	X	X	2
Saskatchewan (Bibby) 🔨	1	2	0	0	2	2	X	X	7

Sheet 2	1	2	3	4	5	6	7	8	Final
Newfoundland and Labrador (Harvey)	0	0	2	0	4	0	0	0	6
Nunavut (Sattelberger) 🔨	2	1	0	1	0	1	0	0	5

Sheet 3	1	2	3	4	5	6	7	8	Final
Northwest Territories (Sittinchinli)	0	0	0	1	2	0	0	0	3
Manitoba (Mandryk) 🔨	3	0	1	0	0	2	1	0	7

Sheet 4	1	2	3	4	5	6	7	8	Final
New Brunswick (Lewis) 🔨	0	1	0	1	1	0	1	0	4
Yukon (Hamilton)	0	0	3	0	0	1	0	1	5

Sheet 5	1	2	3	4	5	6	7	8	Final
Ontario (Balsdon)	2	1	0	5	0	3	X	X	11
Quebec (Monroe) 🔨	0	0	1	0	1	0	X	X	2

Sheet 6	1	2	3	4	5	6	7	8	Final
Alberta (Thurber) 🔨	0	1	0	0	0	1	X	X	2
British Columbia (Hodder)	1	0	2	1	2	0	X	X	6

Northern Ontario and Nova Scotia receive byes this round.

==== Draw 9 ====
Thursday, November 24, 10:00 am

Sheet 1	1	2	3	4	5	6	7	8	Final
Manitoba (Mandryk) 🔨	0	1	1	0	0	4	0	1	7
New Brunswick (Lewis)	1	0	0	2	0	0	1	0	4

Sheet 2	1	2	3	4	5	6	7	8	Final
Nova Scotia (Atherton) 🔨	1	0	1	3	0	0	2	X	7
Prince Edward Island (Clarey)	0	1	0	0	0	3	0	X	4

Sheet 3	1	2	3	4	5	6	7	8	Final
Yukon (Hamilton)	0	2	0	0	1	0	1	2	6
British Columbia (Hodder) 🔨	1	0	1	1	0	1	0	0	4

Sheet 4	1	2	3	4	5	6	7	8	Final
Saskatchewan (Bibby) 🔨	0	1	0	0	0	2	0	X	3
Newfoundland and Labrador (Harvey)	2	0	1	0	2	0	2	X	7

Sheet 5	1	2	3	4	5	6	7	8	Final
Northern Ontario (Dubinsky)	0	2	0	2	0	1	2	X	7
Northwest Territories (Sittinchinli) 🔨	2	0	1	0	1	0	0	X	4

Sheet 6	1	2	3	4	5	6	7	8	Final
Nunavut (Sattelberger) 🔨	5	0	1	3	0	0	3	X	12
Quebec (Monroe)	0	2	0	0	1	1	0	X	4

Alberta and Ontario receive byes this round.

==== Draw 11 ====
Thursday, November 24, 4:45 pm

Sheet 1	1	2	3	4	5	6	7	8	Final
Nunavut (Sattelberger)	0	2	1	0	2	0	0	0	5
Nova Scotia (Atherton) 🔨	3	0	0	2	0	2	4	1	12

Sheet 2	1	2	3	4	5	6	7	8	Final
British Columbia (Hodder)	0	2	0	0	4	0	2	0	8
New Brunswick (Lewis) 🔨	2	0	1	0	0	2	0	0	5

Sheet 3	1	2	3	4	5	6	7	8	Final
Alberta (Thurber)	2	2	0	0	4	0	0	X	8
Northwest Territories (Sittinchinli) 🔨	0	0	0	2	0	1	0	X	3

Sheet 4	1	2	3	4	5	6	7	8	Final
Ontario (Balsdon) 🔨	0	2	1	1	0	1	0	0	5
Prince Edward Island (Clarey)	0	0	0	0	2	0	1	0	3

Sheet 5	1	2	3	4	5	6	7	8	Final
Quebec (Monroe) 🔨	0	1	0	1	2	0	0	X	4
Newfoundland and Labrador (Harvey)	2	0	2	0	0	1	1	X	6

Sheet 6	1	2	3	4	5	6	7	8	Final
Yukon (Hamilton) 🔨	3	0	1	0	2	0	0	0	6
Northern Ontario (Dubinsky)	0	3	0	1	0	1	1	1	7

Manitoba and Saskatchewan receive byes this round.

==== Draw 14 ====
Friday, November 25, 12:30 pm

Sheet 1	1	2	3	4	5	6	7	8	Final
Newfoundland and Labrador (Harvey) 🔨	2	0	2	0	0	0	0	3	7
Prince Edward Island (Clarey)	0	2	0	1	1	1	1	0	6

Sheet 2	1	2	3	4	5	6	7	8	Final
Quebec (Monroe)	1	1	0	1	0	1	0	1	5
Nova Scotia (Atherton) 🔨	0	0	1	0	1	0	2	0	4

Sheet 3	1	2	3	4	5	6	7	8	Final
Ontario (Balsdon)	0	1	1	0	4	0	1	X	7
Saskatchewan (Bibby) 🔨	2	0	0	1	0	1	0	X	4

Sheet 4	1	2	3	4	5	6	7	8	9	Final
British Columbia (Hodder)	0	0	3	1	0	0	3	0	0	7
Northern Ontario (Dubinsky) 🔨	1	2	0	0	1	1	0	2	1	8

Sheet 5	1	2	3	4	5	6	7	8	Final
Alberta (Thurber) 🔨	0	2	1	0	2	1	X	X	6
Manitoba (Mandryk)	0	0	0	1	0	0	X	X	1

Sheet 6	1	2	3	4	5	6	7	8	9	Final
New Brunswick (Lewis)	0	0	0	1	0	1	2	0	2	6
Northwest Territories (Sittinchinli) 🔨	1	0	0	0	2	0	0	1	0	4

Yukon and Nunavut receive byes this round.

=== Tiebreaker ===
Friday, November 25, 8:00 pm

Sheet F	1	2	3	4	5	6	7	8	Final
Manitoba (Mandryk) 🔨	1	0	0	0	1	0	2	0	4
Northern Ontario (Dubinsky)	0	0	1	0	0	2	0	2	5

=== Playoffs ===
Semifinal
G1	Ontario	6
B2	Northern Ontario	4
A1	Alberta	7
G2	Newfoundland and Labrador	6

Final
G1	Ontario	2
A1	Alberta	6

==== Semifinals ====
Saturday, November 26, 9:00 am

Sheet D	1	2	3	4	5	6	7	8	Final
Ontario (Balsdon) 🔨	0	4	1	0	1	0	0	X	6
Northern Ontario (Dubinsky)	1	0	0	2	0	0	1	X	4

Sheet E	1	2	3	4	5	6	7	8	Final
Alberta (Thurber) 🔨	0	0	2	0	0	2	0	3	7
Newfoundland and Labrador (Harvey)	0	1	0	1	1	0	3	0	6

==== Final ====
Saturday, November 26, 2:00 pm

Team	1	2	3	4	5	6	7	8	Final
Ontario (Balsdon) 🔨	0	0	1	0	0	1	0	X	2
Alberta (Thurber)	1	1	0	1	1	0	2	X	6
