= Greg Balsdon =

Canadian curler

- Curler
- Born: October 9, 1977 (age 49); North York, Ontario

Team
- Curling club: Richmond Hill CC, Richmond Hill
- Skip: Greg Balsdon
- Third: Jordan Keon
- Second: Curtis Samoy
- Lead: Trevor Talbott
- Alternate: Michael Keon

Curling career
- Member Association: Ontario (1994-2019; 2022-Present); Quebec (2020-2021)
- Brier: 1 (2014)
- Top CTRS ranking: 13th (2013–14)

Gregory Balsdon (born October 9, 1977) is a Canadian curler from North York, Ontario. He currently skips a team on the World Curling Tour.

== Curling career ==
Balsdon was born in Toronto, Ontario. In 1995, Balsdon won the Ontario Schoolboy championship for his Don Mills Collegiate Institute team. In 1996, he won the provincial junior mixed title.

Balsdon skips one of the top teams in Ontario. As of 2019, Balsdon has played in 13 provincial championships. He first played at the provincials in 1999, playing for John Base (4th place). He left the Base rink in 2000 to form his own team. He qualified again in 2002 as a skip, again finishing 4th. His next provincial was the 2005 Ontario Kia Cup, where his rink finished 4th once again. He qualified again in 2007, where he once again finished 4th at the 2007 TSC Stores Tankard. His next provincial in 2011 would be more successful. At the 2011 provincial championship, he lost to the (then) five-time defending champion Glenn Howard rink in the final. At the time, Balsdon represented the one-sheet Loonie Curling Club located in Chaffeys Locks, Ontario, north of Kingston. Despite representing the club, he had only played there once. The Loonie was built in 2008, and Balsdon has represented it twice. Balsdon returned to the Tankard in 2012, finishing tied for 8th. Despite battling an injury for much of the season, Balsdon won his first provincial men's title in 2014, when his rink defeated Glenn Howard in the Ontario final. The win broke Howard's record eight-year provincial championship streak. The team was named after third Mark Bice who had skipped the team through zone and regional play due to Baldson recovering from a broken rib. However, Balsdon would skip the team in the provincial championship. The team represented Ontario at the 2014 Tim Hortons Brier, where they went 5-6 in the round robin, missing the playoffs. The following season, at the 2015 Ontario Tankard, Balsdon and his rink lost in a tie breaker. Following the season, the team broke up.

In 2015, Balsdon formed a new team with Don Bowser, Jonathan Beuk and Scott Chadwick. On the tour that season, the team won the 2015 Challenge Casino de Charlevoix. The team played in the 2016 Ontario Tankard, where they lost in the 3 vs. 4 game. The next season, the team won the 2016 GSOC Tour Challenge Tier II event. They missed out on the playoffs at the 2017 Ontario Tankard by losing in a tiebreaker. In their last season together, the team played in the 2017 Canadian Olympic Pre-Trials, where they lost in the B semi-final to Glenn Howard's rink. Later that season, they played in the 2018 Ontario Tankard, but failed to make the playoff round.

Beginning in 2018, Balsdon formed a new team with Chris Gardner, Brad Kidd and Andrew Denny-Petch. The team made it to the 2019 Ontario Tankard.

Outside of his regular men's team, in October 2011, Balsdon skipped the Richmond Hill Curling Club to the provincial Dominion Curling Club championship. Representing Ontario, Balsdon and his rink lost in the final of the 2011 The Dominion Curling Club Championship to Wade Thurber's Red Deer rink of Alberta. In November 2012, Balsdon won the 2013 Canadian Mixed Curling Championship playing second for Cory Heggestad. And, in 2018, Balsdon won the Ontario Intermediate Men's Championship for curlers over 40.

Balsdon won his second provincial curling club championship in 2022 for the Richmond Hill Curling Club. His rink went on to win the 2022 Canadian Curling Club Championships.

== Personal life ==
Balsdon is employed as an assistant curling professional at the Toronto Cricket Club. He is married. His sister is fellow curler Megan Balsdon.

== Grand Slam record ==
Key
C	Champion
F	Lost in Final
SF	Lost in Semifinal
QF	Lost in Quarterfinals
R16	Lost in the round of 16
Q	Did not advance to playoffs
T2	Played in Tier 2 event
DNP	Did not participate in event
N/A	Not a Grand Slam event that season

Event	2003–04	2004–05	2005–06	2006–07	2007–08	2008–09	2009–10	2010–11	2011–12	2012–13	2013–14	2014–15	2015–16	2016–17	2017–18
Masters / World Cup	DNP	DNP	DNP	DNP	DNP	DNP	DNP	DNP	Q	DNP	DNP	DNP	DNP	DNP	DNP
The National	Q	DNP	DNP	DNP	DNP	DNP	DNP	DNP	DNP	Q	DNP	DNP	DNP	DNP	Q
Canadian Open	DNP	DNP	DNP	DNP	DNP	DNP	DNP	DNP	DNP	DNP	DNP	DNP	DNP	Q	DNP
Players'	DNP	DNP	DNP	DNP	DNP	DNP	DNP	DNP	DNP	Q	DNP	DNP	DNP	DNP	DNP
Champions Cup	N/A	N/A	N/A	N/A	N/A	N/A	N/A	N/A	N/A	N/A	N/A	N/A	DNP	Q	DNP
