= Richmond Hill Curling Club =

Curling centre in Richmond Hill, Ontario

- Interactive map of Richmond Hill Curling Club
- Location: 121 Elgin Mills Road E Richmond Hill, Ontario L4C 3A8; 43.88999°N 79.43786°W

Information
- Established: 1889
- Club type: Dedicated Ice
- Curling Canada region: OCA Zone 7
- Sheets of ice: Six
- Rock colours: Red and Yellow
- Website: http://www.rhcurling.ca

The Richmond Hill Curling Club (or RHCC) is a curling centre located in the town of Richmond Hill, Ontario, Canada. The modern RHCC has been in operation since 1959; however, the original RHCC was established in 1889. The club has a 12-person Board of Directors which is elected by the membership at large. The Board is responsible for all club operations.

The RHCC is a stable 6-sheet club that has curling leagues operating Sunday through Friday, with many bonspiels and rentals on Saturdays. The RHCC is a member of the Toronto Curling Association (TCA), CurlON (formerly known as the Ontario Curling Association) and Curling Canada.

== Provincial champions ==
- Senior Mixed (1991): Art Lobel, Shirley Lobel, Wes Draper, Carole Draper
- Men's Silver Tankard (2000): Rob Shepherd, Ted Anderson, Bill Bruce, Dave Maxwell; Jim Dyas, John Rumney, Don Campbell, John Headley
- Men's Bantam (2009): Pedro Malvar, Adam Tambosso, Rory James, Ben Bernier
- Men's Curling Club Championship (2011): Greg Balsdon, Jordan Keon, Curtis Samoy, Kevin Roberts (Canadian Silver)
- Men's Curling Club Championship (2012): Jordan Keon, Curtis Samoy, Trevor Talbott, Michael Keon
- Men's Curling Club Championship (2017): Jon St. Denis, Steven Anderson, Peter Laidlaw, Jordan Keon
- Men's Intermediates Championship (2018): Greg Balsdon, Jordan Keon, Mike Maddin, Peter Laidlaw
- Men's Curling Club Championship (2022): Greg Balsdon, Jordan Keon, Curtis Samoy, Trevor Talbott (Canadian Champions)
- Men's Curling Club Championship (2024): Jordan Keon, Ryan Werenich, Curtis Samoy, Trevor Talbott (Canadian Champions)

== Canadian champions ==
- Men's Curling Club Championship (2022): Greg Balsdon, Jordan Keon, Curtis Samoy, Trevor Talbott
- Men's Curling Club Championship (2024): Jordan Keon, Ryan Werenich, Curtis Samoy, Trevor Talbott
