= 2021 Canadian Mixed Doubles Curling Championship =

- Host city: Calgary, Alberta
- Arena: Markin MacPhail Centre, Canada Olympic Park
- Dates: March 18–25
- Winner: (Manitoba) (Newfoundland and Labrador) Einarson / Gushue
- Curling club: Gimli CC, Gimli & St. John's CC, St. John's
- Female: Kerri Einarson
- Male: Brad Gushue
- Finalist: (Manitoba) Sahaidak / Lott

The 2021 Canadian Mixed Doubles Curling Championship (branded as the 2021 Home Hardware Canadian Mixed Doubles Curling Championship for sponsorship reasons) was held from March 18 to 25 at the Markin MacPhail Centre at Canada Olympic Park in Calgary, Alberta. The winning pair of Kerri Einarson and Brad Gushue represented Canada at the 2021 World Mixed Doubles Curling Championship in Aberdeen, Scotland

Due to the COVID-19 pandemic in Canada, it was announced that most Curling Canada championships still being held in the 2020–21 curling season would be moved to a centralized "bubble" (similar to that of the NHL as in Edmonton) at Canada Olympic Park. All events will be held behind closed doors with no spectators. In addition, due to COVID-19 restrictions and logistics, most provincial playdowns have been cancelled, with teams being selected by their respective member associations.

During the night of Sunday, March 21, Darren Moulding was experiencing back spasms, forcing him and partner Joanne Courtney to forfeit their match the next morning. Later that day, the duo officially pulled out of the competition.

== Teams ==
Due to the cancellation of the 2020 Canadian Mixed Doubles Curling Championship, the 2021 championship used a new format including 35 teams.

The teams are listed as follows:

=== Provincial and territorial representatives ===
Province / Territory	Female	Male	Club(s)
Alberta	Brittany Tran	Aaron Sluchinski	The Glencoe Club & Airdrie Curling Club
British Columbia	Stephanie Jackson-Baier	Corey Chester	Victoria Curling Club
Manitoba	Krysten Karwacki	Derek Samagalski	West St. Paul Curling Club
New Brunswick	Melissa Adams	Alex Robichaud	Capital Winter Club
Newfoundland and Labrador	Mackenzie Mitchell	Greg Smith	RE/MAX Centre & Bally Haly Country Club
Northern Ontario	Oye-Sem Won	Trevor Bonot	Port Arthur Curling Club
Northwest Territories	Elizabeth King	Landon King	Yellowknife Curling Centre
Nova Scotia	Karlee Jones	Bryce Everist	Halifax Curling Club
Nunavut	Angela Dale	Peter Van Strien	Iqaluit Curling Club
Ontario	Lauren Wasylkiw	Shane Konings	Unionville Curling Club
Prince Edward Island	Lauren MacFadyen	Alex MacFadyen	Silver Fox Curling Club
Quebec	Laurie St-Georges	Félix Asselin	Glenmore Curling Club
Saskatchewan	Ashley Quick	Mike Armstrong	Sutherland Curling Club
Yukon	Bayly Scoffin	Wade Scoffin	Whitehorse Curling Club

=== Canadian Mixed Doubles Ranking qualifiers ===
Female	Male	Province / Territory
Shannon Birchard	Catlin Schneider	Manitoba / Saskatchewan
Émilie Desjardins	Robert Desjardins	Quebec
Clancy Grandy	Pat Janssen	Ontario
Dezaray Hawes (Note: Team Hawes / Tardi is replacing Team Katie Cottrill / Shawn Cottrill, who declined their CMDR berth.)	Tyler Tardi	British Columbia
Jennifer Jones	Brent Laing	Ontario
Chaelynn Kitz	Kyler Kleibrink (Note: Kyler Kleibrink is replacing Brayden Stewart as Chaelynn Kitz's partner.)	Saskatchewan / Alberta
Kaitlyn Lawes	Connor Lawes	Manitoba / Ontario
Nancy Martin	Tyrel Griffith	Saskatchewan / British Columbia
Jocelyn Peterman	Brett Gallant	Manitoba / Newfoundland and Labrador
Kadriana Sahaidak	Colton Lott	Manitoba
Bobbie Sauder	Brendan Bottcher	Alberta
Danielle Schmiemann (Note: Danielle Schmiemann is replacing Rachel Homan as John Morris' partner.)	John Morris	Alberta
Kim Tuck	Wayne Tuck	Ontario
Laura Walker	Kirk Muyres	Alberta / Saskatchewan

=== Teams unable to play during the 2020–21 season ===
Seven teams who were unable to compete during the 2020–21 season due to the COVID-19 pandemic in Canada also qualified for the event. Each player was ranked based on their top three CTRS events during the 2019–20 season. Both players must also be part of Curling Canada's National Team program.

Female	Male	Province / Territory
Joanne Courtney	Darren Moulding	Alberta
Kerri Einarson	Brad Gushue	Manitoba / Newfoundland and Labrador
Briane Meilleur	Mark Nichols	Manitoba / Newfoundland and Labrador
Emma Miskew	Ryan Fry	Ontario
Selena Njegovan	Reid Carruthers	Manitoba
Val Sweeting	Marc Kennedy	Alberta
Lisa Weagle	John Epping	Ontario

== Round-robin standings ==
Final round-robin standings

Key
Teams to Championship Round

Pool A	W	L	S%	LSD
(Manitoba) (Newfoundland and Labrador) Peterman / Gallant	5	1	85%	152.8
(Manitoba) Sahaidak / Lott	5	1	79%	222.4
(Alberta) Tran / Sluchinski	4	2	76%	197.7
(Ontario) Grandy / Janssen	3	3	76%	335.1
(Alberta) Courtney / Moulding (Note: Withdrew from tournament)	3	3	82%	1170.9
(New Brunswick) Adams / Robichaud	1	5	69%	1009.3
(Nunavut) Dale / Van Strien	0	6	50%	1395.8

Pool B	W	L	S%	LSD
(Ontario) Jones / Laing	5	1	83%	295.7
(Manitoba) (Newfoundland and Labrador) Einarson / Gushue	5	1	82%	166.1
(Quebec) St-Georges / Asselin	4	2	78%	437.1
(Quebec) Desjardins / Desjardins	3	3	72%	381.6
(Ontario) Wasylkiw / Konings	2	4	71%	506.2
(Ontario) Tuck / Tuck	2	4	69%	321.0
(Yukon) Scoffin / Scoffin	0	6	65%	923.3

Pool C	W	L	S%	LSD
(Alberta) (Saskatchewan) Walker / Muyres	6	0	83%	173.3
(Saskatchewan) (British Columbia) Martin / Griffith	4	2	77%	425.5
(Manitoba) Njegovan / Carruthers	4	2	80%	327.3
(Manitoba) (Newfoundland and Labrador) Meilleur / Nichols	3	3	76%	242.3
(Saskatchewan) (Alberta) Kitz / Kleibrink	2	4	75%	853.5
(Prince Edward Island) MacFadyen / MacFadyen	1	5	66%	836.7
(British Columbia) Jackson-Baier / Chester	1	5	69%	486.90

Pool D	W	L	S%	LSD
(Ontario) Miskew / Fry	5	1	78%	446.0
(Alberta) Sweeting / Kennedy	5	1	83%	311.2
(Manitoba) (Saskatchewan) Birchard / Schneider	4	2	82%	229.5
(Manitoba) Karwacki / Samagalski	3	3	80%	277.2
(Nova Scotia) Jones / Everist	3	3	76%	265.0
(Alberta) Sauder / Bottcher	1	5	70%	631.7
(Northwest Territories) King / King	0	6	50%	932.4

Pool E	W	L	S%	LSD
(Alberta) Schmiemann / Morris	5	1	78%	422.0
(Ontario) Weagle / Epping	5	1	77%	392.9
(Newfoundland and Labrador) Mitchell / Smith	4	2	76%	177.1
(Saskatchewan) Quick / Armstrong	2	4	78%	537.5
(Northern Ontario) Won / Bonot	2	4	67%	321.6
(British Columbia) Hawes / Tardi	2	4	75%	448.8
(Manitoba) (Ontario) Lawes / Lawes	1	5	70%	346.3

== Round-robin results ==
All draw times are listed in Mountain Standard Time (UTC−07:00).

=== Draw 1 ===
Thursday, March 18, 8:30 am

Sheet A	1	2	3	4	5	6	7	8	Final
(Manitoba) Sahaidak / Lott	1	0	1	1	1	0	4	X	8
(Ontario) Grandy / Janssen	0	1	0	0	0	1	0	X	2

Sheet B	1	2	3	4	5	6	7	8	Final
(Alberta) Courtney / Moulding	0	0	0	1	0	3	0	3	7
(Manitoba) (Newfoundland and Labrador) Peterman / Gallant	2	1	1	0	1	0	1	0	6

Sheet C	1	2	3	4	5	6	7	8	Final
(Quebec) Desjardins / Desjardins	0	0	0	0	2	0	1	X	3
(Ontario) Jones / Laing	3	1	1	2	0	1	0	X	8

Sheet D	1	2	3	4	5	6	7	8	Final
(Yukon) Scoffin / Scoffin	0	0	0	1	0	0	0	X	1
(Manitoba) (Newfoundland and Labrador) Einarson / Gushue	1	2	2	0	2	1	1	X	9

=== Draw 2 ===
Thursday, March 18, 11:30 am

Sheet A	1	2	3	4	5	6	7	8	Final
(Manitoba) (Newfoundland and Labrador) Meilleur / Nichols	0	1	0	1	0	2	0	X	4
(Manitoba) Njegovan / Carruthers	2	0	1	0	4	0	4	X	11

Sheet B	1	2	3	4	5	6	7	8	Final
(Prince Edward Island) MacFadyen / MacFadyen	0	1	2	0	2	0	1	0	6
(Saskatchewan) (British Columbia) Martin / Griffith	3	0	0	3	0	2	0	2	10

Sheet C	1	2	3	4	5	6	7	8	Final
(Ontario) Miskew / Fry	0	0	0	1	0	1	0	X	2
(Manitoba) (Saskatchewan) Birchard / Schneider	1	1	1	0	1	0	3	X	7

Sheet D	1	2	3	4	5	6	7	8	Final
(Alberta) Sweeting / Kennedy	4	0	4	0	0	2	X	X	10
(Alberta) Sauder / Bottcher	0	1	0	1	1	0	X	X	3

=== Draw 3 ===
Thursday, March 18, 2:30 pm

Sheet B	1	2	3	4	5	6	7	8	Final
(British Columbia) Hawes / Tardi	0	1	1	0	0	1	0	1	4
(Ontario) Weagle / Epping	1	0	0	2	2	0	2	0	7

Sheet C	1	2	3	4	5	6	7	8	Final
(Alberta) Schmiemann / Morris	0	2	2	0	0	2	0	2	8
(Newfoundland and Labrador) Mitchell / Smith	3	0	0	2	2	0	3	0	10

Sheet D	1	2	3	4	5	6	7	8	Final
(Northern Ontario) Won / Bonot	4	0	1	2	0	1	1	X	9
(Manitoba) (Ontario) Lawes / Lawes	0	1	0	0	1	0	0	X	2

=== Draw 4 ===
Thursday, March 18, 5:30 pm

Sheet A	1	2	3	4	5	6	7	8	Final
(Alberta) Courtney / Moulding	3	1	3	3	0	1	X	X	11
(Nunavut) Dale / Van Strien	0	0	0	0	2	0	X	X	2

Sheet B	1	2	3	4	5	6	7	8	Final
(Alberta) Tran / Sluchinski	1	0	2	0	2	1	1	X	7
(New Brunswick) Adams / Robichaud	0	2	0	1	0	0	0	X	3

Sheet C	1	2	3	4	5	6	7	8	Final
(Ontario) Wasylkiw / Konings	0	4	0	1	0	0	0	1	6
(Quebec) St-Georges / Asselin	1	0	2	0	2	1	2	0	8

Sheet D	1	2	3	4	5	6	7	8	Final
(Quebec) Desjardins / Desjardins	1	1	0	0	1	0	1	1	5
(Ontario) Tuck / Tuck	0	0	1	2	0	1	0	0	4

=== Draw 5 ===
Thursday, March 18, 8:30 pm

Sheet A	1	2	3	4	5	6	7	8	Final
(Prince Edward Island) MacFadyen / MacFadyen	0	1	0	0	1	1	0	X	3
(Alberta) (Saskatchewan) Walker / Muyres	1	0	2	2	0	0	1	X	6

Sheet B	1	2	3	4	5	6	7	8	Final
(British Columbia) Jackson-Baier / Chester	0	0	1	0	0	2	0	X	3
(Saskatchewan) (Alberta) Kitz / Kleibrink	1	1	0	1	1	0	3	X	7

Sheet C	1	2	3	4	5	6	7	8	Final
(Nova Scotia) Jones / Everist	4	2	0	0	1	0	2	X	9
(Northwest Territories) King / King	0	0	1	1	0	2	0	X	4

Sheet D	1	2	3	4	5	6	7	8	9	Final
(Ontario) Miskew / Fry	1	0	1	0	2	0	3	1	2	10
(Manitoba) Karwacki / Samagalski	0	4	0	1	0	3	0	0	0	8

=== Draw 6 ===
Friday, March 19, 8:30 am

Sheet A	1	2	3	4	5	6	7	8	Final
(Ontario) Weagle / Epping	1	0	3	0	2	0	4	X	10
(Saskatchewan) Quick / Armstrong	0	1	0	1	0	1	0	X	3

Sheet B	1	2	3	4	5	6	7	8	Final
(Manitoba) (Saskatchewan) Birchard / Schneider	1	0	5	1	1	0	X	X	8
(Alberta) Sauder / Bottcher	0	1	0	0	0	1	X	X	2

Sheet D	1	2	3	4	5	6	7	8	Final
(Newfoundland and Labrador) Mitchell / Smith	0	0	2	0	1	0	3	0	6
(British Columbia) Hawes / Tardi	1	2	0	1	0	1	0	2	7

=== Draw 7 ===
Friday, March 19, 11:30 am

Sheet A	1	2	3	4	5	6	7	8	Final
(Ontario) Jones / Laing	1	1	0	5	0	0	3	X	10
(Manitoba) (Newfoundland and Labrador) Einarson / Gushue	0	0	1	0	2	1	0	X	4

Sheet B	1	2	3	4	5	6	7	8	Final
(Ontario) Wasylkiw / Konings	1	0	2	0	0	1	0	2	6
(Yukon) Scoffin / Scoffin	0	1	0	1	1	0	1	0	4

Sheet C	1	2	3	4	5	6	7	8	Final
(Manitoba) (Newfoundland and Labrador) Peterman / Gallant	0	1	0	4	1	0	0	1	7
(Ontario) Grandy / Janssen	1	0	1	0	0	3	1	0	6

Sheet D	1	2	3	4	5	6	7	8	Final
(Saskatchewan) (British Columbia) Martin / Griffith	1	0	1	0	0	2	0	3	7
(Manitoba) Njegovan / Carruthers	0	1	0	1	1	0	2	0	5

=== Draw 8 ===
Friday, March 19, 2:30 pm

Sheet A	1	2	3	4	5	6	7	8	Final
(Quebec) Desjardins / Desjardins	0	0	0	3	0	2	1	0	6
(Quebec) St-Georges / Asselin	1	1	2	0	2	0	0	1	7

Sheet B	1	2	3	4	5	6	7	8	9	Final
(Alberta) Schmiemann / Morris	1	0	1	2	0	1	0	0	1	6
(Manitoba) (Ontario) Lawes / Lawes	0	2	0	0	1	0	1	1	0	5

Sheet C	1	2	3	4	5	6	7	8	Final
(Alberta) Tran / Sluchinski	0	2	1	1	0	0	0	1	5
(Manitoba) Sahaidak / Lott	2	0	0	0	3	2	1	0	8

Sheet D	1	2	3	4	5	6	7	8	Final
(Alberta) Courtney / Moulding	2	1	1	0	1	0	1	X	6
(New Brunswick) Adams / Robichaud	0	0	0	2	0	1	0	X	3

=== Draw 9 ===
Friday, March 19, 5:30 pm

Sheet A	1	2	3	4	5	6	7	8	Final
(Ontario) Miskew / Fry	5	3	1	0	1	1	X	X	11
(Northwest Territories) King / King	0	0	0	1	0	0	X	X	1

Sheet B	1	2	3	4	5	6	7	8	Final
(Nova Scotia) Jones / Everist	0	0	2	0	1	0	2	1	6
(Alberta) Sweeting / Kennedy	3	1	0	1	0	2	0	0	7

Sheet C	1	2	3	4	5	6	7	8	Final
(British Columbia) Jackson-Baier / Chester	3	1	0	1	0	0	0	0	5
(Manitoba) (Newfoundland and Labrador) Meilleur / Nichols	0	0	1	0	2	1	1	1	6

Sheet D	1	2	3	4	5	6	7	8	Final
(Prince Edward Island) MacFadyen / MacFadyen	1	0	1	0	0	0	X	X	2
(Saskatchewan) (Alberta) Kitz / Kleibrink	0	4	0	1	1	2	X	X	8

=== Draw 10 ===
Friday, March 19, 8:30 pm

Sheet A	1	2	3	4	5	6	7	8	Final
(Yukon) Scoffin / Scoffin	0	0	1	0	1	0	X	X	2
(Ontario) Jones / Laing	4	1	0	5	0	3	X	X	13

Sheet B	1	2	3	4	5	6	7	8	Final
(Ontario) Grandy / Janssen	3	3	2	3	0	0	X	X	11
(Nunavut) Dale / Van Strien	0	0	0	0	1	1	X	X	2

Sheet C	1	2	3	4	5	6	7	8	Final
(Manitoba) (Newfoundland and Labrador) Einarson / Gushue	1	0	1	0	4	2	X	X	8
(Ontario) Tuck / Tuck	0	1	0	1	0	0	X	X	2

=== Draw 11 ===
Saturday, March 20, 8:30 am

Sheet A	1	2	3	4	5	6	7	8	Final
(Alberta) Schmiemann / Morris	0	0	5	0	1	1	1	X	8
(Northern Ontario) Won / Bonot	1	1	0	1	0	0	0	X	3

Sheet B	1	2	3	4	5	6	7	8	Final
(Newfoundland and Labrador) Mitchell / Smith	0	2	0	2	1	2	1	X	8
(Saskatchewan) Quick / Armstrong	1	0	2	0	0	0	0	X	3

Sheet C	1	2	3	4	5	6	7	8	Final
(Manitoba) (Ontario) Lawes / Lawes	2	0	2	1	0	2	0	0	7
(British Columbia) Hawes / Tardi	0	3	0	0	2	0	2	1	8

Sheet D	1	2	3	4	5	6	7	8	Final
(Manitoba) Sahaidak / Lott	0	1	0	0	1	0	1	X	3
(Manitoba) (Newfoundland and Labrador) Peterman / Gallant	1	0	3	1	0	2	0	X	7

=== Draw 12 ===
Saturday, March 20, 11:30 am

Sheet A	1	2	3	4	5	6	7	8	9	Final
(Alberta) Sweeting / Kennedy	0	1	0	4	0	0	1	0	1	7
(Manitoba) (Saskatchewan) Birchard / Schneider	1	0	2	0	1	1	0	1	0	6

Sheet B	1	2	3	4	5	6	7	8	Final
(Manitoba) Njegovan / Carruthers	1	0	4	0	0	2	0	0	7
(Alberta) (Saskatchewan) Walker / Muyres	0	1	0	4	1	0	1	2	9

Sheet C	1	2	3	4	5	6	7	8	Final
(Alberta) Sauder / Bottcher	2	0	0	1	0	0	2	0	5
(Manitoba) Karwacki / Samagalski	0	1	1	0	2	1	0	1	6

Sheet D	1	2	3	4	5	6	7	8	Final
(Manitoba) (Newfoundland and Labrador) Meilleur / Nichols	0	3	0	1	1	0	1	0	6
(Saskatchewan) (British Columbia) Martin / Griffith	2	0	4	0	0	2	0	1	9

=== Draw 13 ===
Saturday, March 20, 2:30 pm

Sheet A	1	2	3	4	5	6	7	8	Final
(Manitoba) (Newfoundland and Labrador) Einarson / Gushue	2	0	0	3	0	1	1	X	7
(Ontario) Wasylkiw / Konings	0	1	2	0	2	0	0	X	5

Sheet B	1	2	3	4	5	6	7	8	Final
(Quebec) St-Georges / Asselin	0	0	3	1	2	2	0	X	8
(Ontario) Tuck / Tuck	2	1	0	0	0	0	2	X	5

Sheet C	1	2	3	4	5	6	7	8	Final
(New Brunswick) Adams / Robichaud	0	2	3	0	3	4	X	X	12
(Nunavut) Dale / Van Strien	1	0	0	1	0	0	X	X	2

Sheet D	1	2	3	4	5	6	7	8	Final
(Ontario) Grandy / Janssen	1	0	2	1	0	0	2	0	6
(Alberta) Tran / Sluchinski	0	3	0	0	1	2	0	2	8

=== Draw 14 ===
Saturday, March 20, 5:30 pm

Sheet B	1	2	3	4	5	6	7	8	Final
(Ontario) Weagle / Epping	0	1	1	0	1	0	2	0	5
(Alberta) Schmiemann / Morris	1	0	0	1	0	2	0	3	7

Sheet C	1	2	3	4	5	6	7	8	Final
(Newfoundland and Labrador) Mitchell / Smith	0	1	0	2	2	0	1	2	8
(Northern Ontario) Won / Bonot	1	0	4	0	0	2	0	0	7

Sheet D	1	2	3	4	5	6	7	8	Final
(British Columbia) Hawes / Tardi	1	1	0	4	0	1	0	X	7
(Saskatchewan) Quick / Armstrong	0	0	3	0	4	0	4	X	11

=== Draw 15 ===
Saturday, March 20, 8:30 pm

Sheet A	1	2	3	4	5	6	7	8	Final
(Alberta) Sauder / Bottcher	0	1	3	0	0	1	0	0	5
(Nova Scotia) Jones / Everist	1	0	0	1	1	0	1	2	6

Sheet B	1	2	3	4	5	6	7	8	Final
(Northwest Territories) King / King	4	0	1	0	0	0	0	X	5
(Manitoba) Karwacki / Samagalski	0	3	0	2	3	4	3	X	15

Sheet C	1	2	3	4	5	6	7	8	Final
(Saskatchewan) (Alberta) Kitz / Kleibrink	2	1	0	0	0	1	0	X	4
(Alberta) (Saskatchewan) Walker / Muyres	0	0	3	2	4	0	2	X	11

Sheet D	1	2	3	4	5	6	7	8	Final
(Manitoba) Njegovan / Carruthers	0	1	1	2	2	0	1	X	7
(British Columbia) Jackson-Baier / Chester	1	0	0	0	0	1	0	X	2

=== Draw 16 ===
Sunday, March 21, 8:30 am

Sheet A	1	2	3	4	5	6	7	8	Final
(Nunavut) Dale / Van Strien	0	0	0	0	0	1	X	X	1
(Alberta) Tran / Sluchinski	3	3	4	1	3	0	X	X	14

Sheet B	Final
(Manitoba) Sahaidak / Lott	W
(Alberta) Courtney / Moulding	L

Sheet C	1	2	3	4	5	6	7	8	Final
(Yukon) Scoffin / Scoffin	0	0	0	1	1	0	0	X	2
(Quebec) Desjardins / Desjardins	1	2	2	0	0	1	3	X	9

Sheet D	1	2	3	4	5	6	7	8	Final
(Ontario) Jones / Laing	0	1	2	1	1	0	2	X	7
(Quebec) St-Georges / Asselin	2	0	0	0	0	1	0	X	3

=== Draw 17 ===
Sunday, March 21, 11:30 am

Sheet A	1	2	3	4	5	6	7	8	Final
(Saskatchewan) (British Columbia) Martin / Griffith	2	0	2	1	1	0	3	X	9
(Saskatchewan) (Alberta) Kitz / Kleibrink	0	1	0	0	0	1	0	X	2

Sheet B	1	2	3	4	5	6	7	8	Final
(Manitoba) (Newfoundland and Labrador) Meilleur / Nichols	0	2	0	3	0	2	1	X	8
(Prince Edward Island) MacFadyen / MacFadyen	2	0	1	0	1	0	0	X	4

Sheet C	1	2	3	4	5	6	7	8	Final
(Alberta) Sweeting / Kennedy	2	0	0	0	1	0	4	0	7
(Ontario) Miskew / Fry	0	1	1	2	0	3	0	2	9

Sheet D	1	2	3	4	5	6	7	8	Final
(Manitoba) (Saskatchewan) Birchard / Schneider	3	1	2	1	1	0	4	X	12
(Northwest Territories) King / King	0	0	0	0	0	1	0	X	1

=== Draw 18 ===
Sunday, March 21, 2:30 pm

Sheet A	1	2	3	4	5	6	7	8	Final
(Northern Ontario) Won / Bonot	0	0	2	1	0	0	0	3	6
(British Columbia) Hawes / Tardi	1	1	0	0	1	1	1	0	5

Sheet B	1	2	3	4	5	6	7	8	Final
(Manitoba) (Newfoundland and Labrador) Einarson / Gushue	1	0	1	1	2	0	2	X	7
(Quebec) Desjardins / Desjardins	0	2	0	0	0	1	0	X	3

Sheet C	1	2	3	4	5	6	7	8	9	Final
(Saskatchewan) Quick / Armstrong	2	0	1	0	0	2	1	1	0	7
(Manitoba) (Ontario) Lawes / Lawes	0	3	0	3	1	0	0	0	1	8

Sheet D	1	2	3	4	5	6	7	8	Final
(Ontario) Weagle / Epping	1	1	1	0	0	2	0	1	6
(Newfoundland and Labrador) Mitchell / Smith	0	0	0	1	1	0	2	0	4

=== Draw 19 ===
Sunday, March 21, 5:30 pm

Sheet A	1	2	3	4	5	6	7	8	Final
(Manitoba) (Newfoundland and Labrador) Peterman / Gallant	5	0	2	0	3	1	X	X	11
(New Brunswick) Adams / Robichaud	0	2	0	1	0	0	X	X	3

Sheet C	Final
(Ontario) Grandy / Janssen	W
(Alberta) Courtney / Moulding	L

Sheet D	1	2	3	4	5	6	7	8	Final
(Ontario) Tuck / Tuck	0	0	2	0	1	2	0	0	5
(Ontario) Wasylkiw / Konings	1	1	0	3	0	0	1	1	7

=== Draw 20 ===
Sunday, March 21, 8:30 pm

Sheet A	1	2	3	4	5	6	7	8	Final
(Alberta) (Saskatchewan) Walker / Muyres	2	0	2	0	1	2	1	X	8
(British Columbia) Jackson-Baier / Chester	0	2	0	1	0	0	0	X	3

Sheet B	1	2	3	4	5	6	7	8	Final
(Alberta) Sauder / Bottcher	0	1	0	0	1	0	0	X	2
(Ontario) Miskew / Fry	2	0	1	1	0	1	1	X	6

Sheet C	1	2	3	4	5	6	7	8	Final
(Manitoba) Njegovan / Carruthers	1	1	2	0	1	1	1	X	7
(Prince Edward Island) MacFadyen / MacFadyen	0	0	0	1	0	0	0	X	1

Sheet D	1	2	3	4	5	6	7	8	Final
(Manitoba) Karwacki / Samagalski	3	0	3	1	0	2	0	X	9
(Nova Scotia) Jones / Everist	0	1	0	0	1	0	1	X	3

=== Draw 21 ===
Monday, March 22, 8:30 am

Sheet A	1	2	3	4	5	6	7	8	Final
(Ontario) Tuck / Tuck	0	0	3	0	2	0	0	2	7
(Yukon) Scoffin / Scoffin	1	1	0	1	0	2	1	0	6

Sheet B	1	2	3	4	5	6	7	8	Final
(Manitoba) (Newfoundland and Labrador) Peterman / Gallant	1	0	1	0	1	1	0	4	8
(Alberta) Tran / Sluchinski	0	2	0	2	0	0	3	0	7

Sheet C	1	2	3	4	5	6	7	8	Final
(Ontario) Jones / Laing	1	1	1	1	0	3	0	0	7
(Ontario) Wasylkiw / Konings	0	0	0	0	3	0	1	0	4

Sheet D	1	2	3	4	5	6	7	8	Final
(Nunavut) Dale / Van Strien	1	0	0	0	0	0	X	X	1
(Manitoba) Sahaidak / Lott	0	3	1	3	1	3	X	X	11

=== Draw 22 ===
Monday, March 22, 11:30 am

Sheet A	1	2	3	4	5	6	7	8	Final
(Manitoba) (Ontario) Lawes / Lawes	3	0	0	0	1	0	0	X	4
(Newfoundland and Labrador) Mitchell / Smith	0	1	2	2	0	2	1	X	8

Sheet C	1	2	3	4	5	6	7	8	Final
(Northern Ontario) Won / Bonot	0	2	0	1	0	1	X	X	4
(Ontario) Weagle / Epping	4	0	4	0	1	0	X	X	9

Sheet D	1	2	3	4	5	6	7	8	Final
(Alberta) (Saskatchewan) Walker / Muyres	1	0	1	2	1	0	2	X	7
(Manitoba) (Newfoundland and Labrador) Meilleur / Nichols	0	2	0	0	0	2	0	X	4

=== Draw 23 ===
Monday, March 22, 2:30 pm

Sheet A	1	2	3	4	5	6	7	8	Final
(Manitoba) Karwacki / Samagalski	1	0	1	0	0	0	1	X	3
(Alberta) Sweeting / Kennedy	0	1	0	3	2	1	0	X	7

Sheet B	1	2	3	4	5	6	7	8	Final
(Saskatchewan) (British Columbia) Martin / Griffith	1	0	0	3	0	0	1	0	5
(British Columbia) Jackson-Baier / Chester	0	2	2	0	1	1	0	2	8

Sheet C	1	2	3	4	5	6	7	8	Final
(Manitoba) (Saskatchewan) Birchard / Schneider	1	0	0	1	2	0	1	0	5
(Nova Scotia) Jones / Everist	0	2	3	0	0	3	0	1	9

Sheet D	1	2	3	4	5	6	7	8	Final
(Saskatchewan) Quick / Armstrong	1	0	0	2	0	0	1	X	4
(Alberta) Schmiemann / Morris	0	1	2	0	3	1	0	X	7

=== Draw 24 ===
Monday, March 22, 5:30 pm

Sheet A	1	2	3	4	5	6	7	8	Final
(Ontario) Wasylkiw / Konings	0	0	0	1	0	1	0	X	2
(Quebec) Desjardins / Desjardins	2	1	1	0	4	0	2	X	10

Sheet B	1	2	3	4	5	6	7	8	Final
(New Brunswick) Adams / Robichaud	0	0	1	0	1	0	1	X	3
(Ontario) Grandy / Janssen	2	3	0	2	0	1	0	X	8

Sheet C	1	2	3	4	5	6	7	8	9	Final
(Quebec) St-Georges / Asselin	0	2	0	1	0	1	2	0	0	6
(Manitoba) (Newfoundland and Labrador) Einarson / Gushue	1	0	2	0	2	0	0	1	1	7

Sheet D	Final
(Alberta) Tran / Sluchinski	W
(Alberta) Courtney / Moulding	L

=== Draw 25 ===
Monday, March 22, 8:30 pm

Sheet A	1	2	3	4	5	6	7	8	Final
(Nova Scotia) Jones / Everist	0	1	0	3	0	1	1	0	6
(Ontario) Miskew / Fry	3	0	3	0	1	0	0	2	9

Sheet B	1	2	3	4	5	6	7	8	Final
(Saskatchewan) (Alberta) Kitz / Kleibrink	0	1	0	1	0	1	0	X	3
(Manitoba) Njegovan / Carruthers	1	0	1	0	3	0	1	X	6

Sheet C	1	2	3	4	5	6	7	8	Final
(Northwest Territories) King / King	0	0	0	0	1	0	X	X	1
(Alberta) Sauder / Bottcher	1	2	3	3	0	2	X	X	11

Sheet D	1	2	3	4	5	6	7	8	Final
(British Columbia) Jackson-Baier / Chester	0	2	2	0	0	1	0	1	6
(Prince Edward Island) MacFadyen / MacFadyen	1	0	0	2	2	0	2	0	7

=== Draw 26 ===
Tuesday, March 23, 8:30 am

Sheet B	1	2	3	4	5	6	7	8	Final
(Saskatchewan) Quick / Armstrong	1	1	1	1	0	2	X	X	6
(Northern Ontario) Won / Bonot	0	0	0	0	1	0	X	X	1

Sheet C	1	2	3	4	5	6	7	8	Final
(British Columbia) Hawes / Tardi	0	0	3	0	0	0	4	0	7
(Alberta) Schmiemann / Morris	1	2	0	1	1	1	0	2	8

Sheet D	1	2	3	4	5	6	7	8	Final
(Manitoba) (Ontario) Lawes / Lawes	1	0	2	0	0	0	2	0	5
(Ontario) Weagle / Epping	0	2	0	1	1	2	0	1	7

=== Draw 27 ===
Tuesday, March 23, 11:30 am

Sheet A	1	2	3	4	5	6	7	8	Final
(New Brunswick) Adams / Robichaud	0	1	0	1	0	0	0	X	2
(Manitoba) Sahaidak / Lott	1	0	2	0	2	1	1	X	7

Sheet B	1	2	3	4	5	6	7	8	9	Final
(Ontario) Tuck / Tuck	0	1	1	0	2	0	4	0	1	9
(Ontario) Jones / Laing	1	0	0	1	0	3	0	3	0	8

Sheet C	1	2	3	4	5	6	7	8	Final
(Nunavut) Dale / Van Strien	0	0	0	0	1	0	X	X	1
(Manitoba) (Newfoundland and Labrador) Peterman / Gallant	1	2	3	1	0	4	X	X	11

Sheet D	1	2	3	4	5	6	7	8	Final
(Quebec) St-Georges / Asselin	0	4	1	1	0	2	1	X	9
(Yukon) Scoffin / Scoffin	1	0	0	0	1	0	0	X	2

=== Draw 28 ===
Tuesday, March 23, 2:30 pm

Sheet A	1	2	3	4	5	6	7	8	Final
(Saskatchewan) (Alberta) Kitz / Kleibrink	3	0	1	0	2	0	0	1	7
(Manitoba) (Newfoundland and Labrador) Meilleur / Nichols	0	3	0	2	0	2	1	0	8

Sheet B	1	2	3	4	5	6	7	8	Final
(Manitoba) Karwacki / Samagalski	0	0	2	0	2	0	2	0	6
(Manitoba) (Saskatchewan) Birchard / Schneider	1	1	0	2	0	3	0	1	8

Sheet C	1	2	3	4	5	6	7	8	Final
(Alberta) (Saskatchewan) Walker / Muyres	1	0	2	0	2	0	0	2	7
(Saskatchewan) (British Columbia) Martin / Griffith	0	2	0	1	0	2	1	0	6

Sheet D	1	2	3	4	5	6	7	8	Final
(Northwest Territories) King / King	0	0	0	0	1	0	X	X	1
(Alberta) Sweeting / Kennedy	1	2	2	2	0	5	X	X	12

== Championship round ==
Round of 12
8	(Alberta) Sweeting / Kennedy	5
9	(Ontario) Weagle / Epping	7
5	(Ontario) Miskew / Fry	6
12	(Manitoba) (Saskatchewan) Birchard / Schneider	10

Round of 8
1	(Alberta) (Saskatchewan) Walker / Muyres	9
9	(Ontario) Weagle / Epping	3
4	(Alberta) Schmiemann / Morris	8
12	(Manitoba) (Saskatchewan) Birchard / Schneider	7

Page Seeding
1	(Alberta) (Saskatchewan) Walker / Muyres	5
4	(Alberta) Schmiemann / Morris	6

Round of 12
7	(Manitoba) Sahaidak / Lott	8
10	(Newfoundland and Labrador) Mitchell / Smith	3
6	(Manitoba) (Newfoundland and Labrador) Einarson / Gushue	9
11	(Alberta) Tran / Sluchinski	8

Round of 8
2	(Manitoba) (Newfoundland and Labrador) Peterman / Gallant	7
7	(Manitoba) Sahaidak / Lott	8
3	(Ontario) Jones / Laing	2
6	(Manitoba) (Newfoundland and Labrador) Einarson / Gushue	11

Page Seeding
7	(Manitoba) Sahaidak / Lott	8
6	(Manitoba) (Newfoundland and Labrador) Einarson / Gushue	5

=== Round of 12 ===
Tuesday, March 23, 6:30 pm

Sheet A	1	2	3	4	5	6	7	8	Final
(Ontario) Miskew / Fry	1	0	0	3	0	2	0	X	6
(Manitoba) (Saskatchewan) Birchard / Schneider	0	4	1	0	2	0	3	X	10

Sheet B	1	2	3	4	5	6	7	8	Final
(Manitoba) (Newfoundland and Labrador) Einarson / Gushue	4	0	2	1	0	1	0	1	9
(Alberta) Tran / Sluchinski	0	2	0	0	2	0	4	0	8

Sheet C	1	2	3	4	5	6	7	8	Final
(Manitoba) Sahaidak / Lott	3	1	1	0	1	0	2	X	8
(Newfoundland and Labrador) Mitchell / Smith	0	0	0	1	0	2	0	X	3

Sheet D	1	2	3	4	5	6	7	8	9	Final
(Alberta) Sweeting / Kennedy	2	0	0	0	2	0	1	0	0	5
(Ontario) Weagle / Epping	0	1	1	1	0	1	0	1	2	7

=== Round of 8 ===
Wednesday, March 24, 10:30 am

Sheet A	1	2	3	4	5	6	7	8	9	Final
(Manitoba) (Newfoundland and Labrador) Peterman / Gallant	0	2	0	0	3	0	1	1	0	7
(Manitoba) Sahaidak / Lott	1	0	2	1	0	3	0	0	1	8

Sheet B	1	2	3	4	5	6	7	8	Final
(Alberta) (Saskatchewan) Walker / Muyres	2	0	3	0	1	1	2	X	9
(Ontario) Weagle / Epping	0	1	0	2	0	0	0	X	3

Sheet C	1	2	3	4	5	6	7	8	Final
(Ontario) Jones / Laing	0	0	0	1	0	1	X	X	2
(Manitoba) (Newfoundland and Labrador) Einarson / Gushue	5	3	2	0	1	0	X	X	11

Sheet D	1	2	3	4	5	6	7	8	Final
(Alberta) Schmiemann / Morris	2	0	2	0	2	1	0	1	8
(Manitoba) (Saskatchewan) Birchard / Schneider	0	3	0	2	0	0	2	0	7

=== Page Seeding ===
Wednesday, March 24, 2:30 pm

Sheet B	1	2	3	4	5	6	7	8	Final
(Manitoba) Sahaidak / Lott	1	0	0	1	0	4	1	1	8
(Manitoba) (Newfoundland and Labrador) Einarson / Gushue	0	2	2	0	1	0	0	0	5

Sheet C	1	2	3	4	5	6	7	8	Final
(Alberta) (Saskatchewan) Walker / Muyres	1	1	0	1	1	0	1	0	5
(Alberta) Schmiemann / Morris	0	0	3	0	0	3	0	0	6

== Playoffs ==
Page playoff system
1	(Manitoba) Sahaidak / Lott	7
2	(Alberta) Schmiemann / Morris	6
3	(Alberta) (Saskatchewan) Walker / Muyres	6
4	(Manitoba) (Newfoundland and Labrador) Einarson / Gushue	8

Semifinal
2	(Alberta) Schmiemann / Morris	6
4	(Manitoba) (Newfoundland and Labrador) Einarson / Gushue	7

Final
1	(Manitoba) Sahaidak / Lott	6
4	(Manitoba) (Newfoundland and Labrador) Einarson / Gushue	9

=== 1 vs. 2 ===
Wednesday, March 24, 6:30 pm

Sheet C	1	2	3	4	5	6	7	8	Final
(Manitoba) Sahaidak / Lott	0	0	2	1	2	0	2	0	7
(Alberta) Schmiemann / Morris	1	1	0	0	0	2	0	2	6

=== 3 vs. 4 ===
Wednesday, March 24, 6:30 pm

Sheet B	1	2	3	4	5	6	7	8	Final
(Alberta) (Saskatchewan) Walker / Muyres	0	2	0	0	2	0	2	0	6
(Manitoba) (Newfoundland and Labrador) Einarson / Gushue	1	0	2	1	0	3	0	1	8

=== Semifinal ===
Thursday, March 25, 2:00 pm

Sheet C	1	2	3	4	5	6	7	8	Final
(Alberta) Schmiemann / Morris	2	0	1	0	0	2	1	0	6
(Manitoba) (Newfoundland and Labrador) Einarson / Gushue	0	3	0	2	1	0	0	1	7

=== Final ===
Thursday, March 25, 7:00 pm

Sheet C	1	2	3	4	5	6	7	8	Final
(Manitoba) Sahaidak / Lott	0	1	0	0	1	0	4	X	6
(Manitoba) (Newfoundland and Labrador) Einarson / Gushue	1	0	2	4	0	2	0	X	9

== Final standings ==
Place	Team
1st place, gold medalist(s)	(Manitoba) (Newfoundland and Labrador) Einarson / Gushue
2nd place, silver medalist(s)	(Manitoba) Sahaidak / Lott
3rd place, bronze medalist(s)	(Alberta) Schmiemann / Morris
4	(Alberta) (Saskatchewan) Walker / Muyres
5	(Manitoba) (Saskatchewan) Birchard / Schneider
5	(Ontario) Jones / Laing
5	(Manitoba) (Newfoundland and Labrador) Peterman / Gallant
5	(Ontario) Weagle / Epping
9	(Ontario) Miskew / Fry
9	(Newfoundland and Labrador) Mitchell / Smith
9	(Alberta) Sweeting / Kennedy
9	(Alberta) Tran / Sluchinski
13	(Manitoba) Njegovan / Carruthers
14	(Saskatchewan) (British Columbia) Martin / Griffith
15	(Quebec) St-Georges / Asselin
16	(Manitoba) (Newfoundland and Labrador) Meilleur / Nichols
17	(Nova Scotia) Jones / Everist
18	(Manitoba) Karwacki / Samagalski
19	(Ontario) Grandy / Janssen
20	(Quebec) Desjardins / Desjardins
21	(Alberta) Courtney / Moulding
22	(Ontario) Tuck / Tuck
23	(Northern Ontario) Won / Bonot
24	(British Columbia) Hawes / Tardi
25	(Ontario) Wasylkiw / Konings
26	(Saskatchewan) Quick / Armstrong
27	(Saskatchewan) (Alberta) Kitz / Kleibrink
28	(Manitoba) (Ontario) Lawes / Lawes
29	(British Columbia) Jackson-Baier / Chester
30	(Alberta) Sauder / Bottcher
31	(Prince Edward Island) MacFadyen / MacFadyen
32	(New Brunswick) Adams / Robichaud
33	(Yukon) Scoffin / Scoffin
34	(Northwest Territories) King / King
35	(Nunavut) Dale / Van Strien
