= 2019 Canadian Mixed Doubles Curling Championship =

2019 Canadian curling tournament

- Host city: Fredericton, New Brunswick
- Arena: Willie O'Ree Place
- Dates: March 19–24
- Winner: (Manitoba) (Newfoundland and Labrador) Peterman / Gallant
- Female: Jocelyn Peterman
- Male: Brett Gallant
- Finalist: (Saskatchewan) (British Columbia) Martin / Griffith

The 2019 Canadian Mixed Doubles Curling Championship was held from March 19 to 24 at the Willie O'Ree Place in Fredericton, New Brunswick.

== Teams ==
The teams are listed as follows:

=== Provincial and territorial champions ===
Province / Territory	Female	Male	Club
Alberta	Chantele Broderson	Kyler Kleibrink	Saville Community Sports Centre & The Glencoe Club
British Columbia	Catera Park	Cody Tanaka	Victoria Curling Club & Tunnel Town Curling Club
Manitoba	Melissa Gordon	Kyle Kurz	Assiniboine Memorial Curling Club
New Brunswick	Leah Thompson	Charlie Sullivan	Thistle-St. Andrews Curling Club
Newfoundland and Labrador	Jenna Harvey	David Thomas	Gateway Curling Club
Northern Ontario	Kira Brunton	Tom Leonard	Curl Sudbury
Northwest Territories	Katharine Thomas	David Aho	Yellowknife Curling Centre
Nova Scotia	Karlee Jones	Bryce Everist	Halifax Curling Club
Nunavut	Alison Griffin	Ed MacDonald	Iqaluit Curling Club
Ontario	Katie Cottrill	Shawn Cottrill	Wingham Golf & Curling Club
Prince Edward Island	Rachel O'Connor	Ryan Abraham	Cornwall Curling Club
Quebec	Sophie Morissette	Pierre-Luc Morissette	Club de curling Trois-Rivières & Club de curling Victoria
Saskatchewan	Jill de Gooijer	Garret Springer	Highland Curling Club
Yukon	Charmaine Thom	Greg Thom	Whitehorse Curling Club

=== Canadian Mixed Doubles Ranking qualifiers ===
Female	Male	Province / Territory
Ashley Groff	Kyle Doering	Manitoba
Bobbie Sauder	Brendan Bottcher	Alberta
Chaelynn Kitz	Brayden Stewart	Saskatchewan
Kadriana Sahaidak	Colton Lott	Manitoba
Danielle Schmiemann	Jason Ginter	Alberta
Dezaray Hawes	Tyler Tardi	British Columbia
Émilie Desjardins	Robert Desjardins	Quebec
Jennifer Jones	Brent Laing	Ontario
Jocelyn Peterman	Brett Gallant	Manitoba / Newfoundland and Labrador
Jolene Campbell	John Morris	Saskatchewan / Alberta
Kate Cameron	Reid Carruthers	Manitoba
Kimberly Tuck	Wayne Tuck	Ontario
Kristen Streifel	Steve Laycock	Saskatchewan
Laura Walker	Kirk Muyres	Alberta / Saskatchewan
Nancy Martin	Tyrel Griffith	Saskatchewan / British Columbia
Shannon Birchard	Catlin Schneider	Manitoba / Saskatchewan
Sherry Just	Dustin Kalthoff	Saskatchewan
Catherine Liscumb	Chris Liscumb	Ontario

== Round-robin standings ==
Final round-robin standings

Key
Teams to playoffs

Pool A	W	L
(British Columbia) Hawes / Tardi	6	1
(Manitoba) (Newfoundland and Labrador) Peterman / Gallant	6	1
(British Columbia) Park / Tanaka	5	2
(Saskatchewan) Streifel / Laycock	4	3
(Quebec) Desjardins / Desjardins	3	4
(Ontario) Cottrill / Cottrill	2	5
(Manitoba) Groff / Doering	2	5
(Nunavut) Griffin / MacDonald	0	7

Pool B	W	L
(Alberta) (Saskatchewan) Walker / Muyres	6	1
(Alberta) Sauder / Bottcher	5	2
(Manitoba) (Saskatchewan) Birchard / Schneider	5	2
(Alberta) Broderson / Kleibrink	4	3
(Saskatchewan) Kitz / Stewart	4	3
(New Brunswick) Thompson / Sullivan	3	4
(Nova Scotia) Jones / Everist	1	6
(Yukon) Thom / Thom	0	7

Pool C	W	L
(Saskatchewan) (British Columbia) Martin / Griffith	6	1
(Manitoba) Sahaidak / Lott	6	1
(Ontario) Jones / Laing	5	2
(Saskatchewan) de Gooijer / Springer	4	3
(Saskatchewan) Just / Kalthoff	3	4
(Northwest Territories) Thomas / Aho	2	5
(Quebec) Morissette / Morissette	2	5
(Newfoundland and Labrador) Harvey / Thomas	0	7

Pool D	W	L
(Saskatchewan) (Alberta) Campbell / Morris	6	1
(Manitoba) Gordon / Kurz	5	2
(Ontario) Tuck / Tuck	5	2
(Manitoba) Cameron / Carruthers	4	3
(Alberta) Schmiemann / Ginter	4	3
(Prince Edward Island) O'Connor / Abraham	2	5
(Northern Ontario) Brunton / Leonard	1	6
(Ontario) Liscumb / Liscumb	1	6

== Round-robin results ==
All draw times are listed in Atlantic Standard Time (UTC−03:00).

=== Draw 1 ===
Tuesday, March 19, 7:00 pm

Sheet A	1	2	3	4	5	6	7	8	Final
(Nunavut) Griffin / MacDonald 🔨	0	1	0	0	0	2	0	X	3
(Saskatchewan) Streifel / Laycock	1	0	2	1	2	0	3	X	9

Sheet B	1	2	3	4	5	6	7	8	Final
(British Columbia) Hawes / Tardi	0	0	2	1	1	0	3	1	8
(Ontario) Cottrill / Cottrill 🔨	1	3	0	0	0	2	0	0	6

Sheet C	1	2	3	4	5	6	7	8	Final
(Manitoba) (Newfoundland and Labrador) Peterman / Gallant	0	3	2	3	0	1	X	X	9
(Manitoba) Groff / Doering 🔨	2	0	0	0	1	0	X	X	3

Sheet D	1	2	3	4	5	6	7	8	Final
(Quebec) Desjardins / Desjardins 🔨	0	1	0	1	0	2	0	0	4
(British Columbia) Park / Tanaka	1	0	1	0	1	0	4	2	9

Sheet F	1	2	3	4	5	6	7	8	Final
(Yukon) Thom / Thom	0	0	0	0	0	0	X	X	0
(Alberta) Sauder / Bottcher 🔨	4	1	2	1	4	3	X	X	15

Sheet G	1	2	3	4	5	6	7	8	Final
(New Brunswick) Thompson / Sullivan	0	1	0	0	0	1	0	0	2
(Saskatchewan) Kitz / Stewart 🔨	2	0	1	1	1	0	1	1	7

Sheet H	1	2	3	4	5	6	7	8	Final
(Alberta) (Saskatchewan) Walker / Muyres	1	0	2	1	0	0	3	X	7
(Nova Scotia) Jones / Everist 🔨	0	1	0	0	1	1	0	X	3

Sheet I	1	2	3	4	5	6	7	8	Final
(Manitoba) (Saskatchewan) Birchard / Schneider	2	0	1	0	1	1	0	X	5
(Alberta) Broderson / Kleibrink 🔨	0	1	0	1	0	0	2	X	4

=== Draw 2 ===
Tuesday, March 19, 9:30 pm

Sheet A	1	2	3	4	5	6	7	8	Final
(Newfoundland and Labrador) Harvey / Thomas	0	0	0	1	0	1	X	X	2
(Saskatchewan) Just / Kalthoff 🔨	3	5	1	0	3	0	X	X	12

Sheet B	1	2	3	4	5	6	7	8	Final
(Saskatchewan) de Gooijer / Springer	0	3	0	0	0	1	X	X	4
(Saskatchewan) (British Columbia) Martin / Griffith 🔨	2	0	2	4	5	0	X	X	13

Sheet C	1	2	3	4	5	6	7	8	Final
(Ontario) Jones / Laing 🔨	2	0	2	1	2	0	2	X	9
(Quebec) Morissette / Morissette	0	1	0	0	0	1	0	X	2

Sheet D	1	2	3	4	5	6	7	8	Final
(Manitoba) Sahaidak / Lott	X	X	X	X	X	X	X	X	W
(Northwest Territories) Thomas / Aho	X	X	X	X	X	X	X	X	L

Note: Thomas / Aho forfeited the match.

Sheet F	1	2	3	4	5	6	7	8	Final
(Northern Ontario) Brunton / Leonard	0	0	3	0	0	2	1	0	6
(Manitoba) Cameron / Carruthers 🔨	1	2	0	2	3	0	0	2	10

Sheet G	1	2	3	4	5	6	7	8	Final
(Prince Edward Island) O'Connor / Abraham 🔨	0	0	2	0	0	2	0	X	4
(Alberta) Schmiemann / Ginter	3	1	0	3	1	0	2	X	10

Sheet H	1	2	3	4	5	6	7	8	Final
(Saskatchewan) (Alberta) Campbell / Morris	0	3	1	0	1	0	2	X	7
(Ontario) Liscumb / Liscumb 🔨	1	0	0	1	0	1	0	X	3

Sheet I	1	2	3	4	5	6	7	8	Final
(Ontario) Tuck / Tuck 🔨	2	0	0	1	0	2	0	0	5
(Manitoba) Gordon / Kurz	0	1	1	0	2	0	3	1	8

=== Draw 3 ===
Wednesday, March 20, 10:00 am

Sheet A	1	2	3	4	5	6	7	8	Final
(Alberta) Broderson / Kleibrink	0	1	0	1	0	1	X	X	3
(Alberta) (Saskatchewan) Walker / Muyres 🔨	3	0	2	0	3	0	X	X	8

Sheet B	1	2	3	4	5	6	7	8	Final
(Manitoba) (Saskatchewan) Birchard / Schneider 🔨	1	0	0	3	0	1	0	2	7
(Nova Scotia) Jones / Everist	0	1	1	0	1	0	1	0	4

Sheet C	1	2	3	4	5	6	7	8	Final
(Alberta) Sauder / Bottcher	3	1	2	0	3	1	0	X	10
(New Brunswick) Thompson / Sullivan 🔨	0	0	0	1	0	0	1	X	2

Sheet D	1	2	3	4	5	6	7	8	Final
(Yukon) Thom / Thom	0	0	0	0	0	0	1	X	1
(Saskatchewan) Kitz / Stewart 🔨	1	1	1	2	1	1	0	X	7

Sheet F	1	2	3	4	5	6	7	8	Final
(British Columbia) Park / Tanaka 🔨	2	0	0	0	0	1	X	X	3
(Manitoba) (Newfoundland and Labrador) Peterman / Gallant	0	4	4	1	1	0	X	X	10

Sheet G	1	2	3	4	5	6	7	8	9	Final
(Quebec) Desjardins / Desjardins 🔨	1	1	0	0	3	1	0	1	2	9
(Manitoba) Groff / Doering	0	0	2	2	0	0	3	0	0	7

Sheet H	1	2	3	4	5	6	7	8	Final
(Saskatchewan) Streifel / Laycock 🔨	3	0	0	0	1	0	1	X	5
(British Columbia) Hawes / Tardi	0	4	1	1	0	1	0	X	7

Sheet I	1	2	3	4	5	6	7	8	Final
(Nunavut) Griffin / MacDonald	0	1	2	0	3	0	0	X	6
(Ontario) Cottrill / Cottrill 🔨	2	0	0	3	0	2	1	X	8

=== Draw 4 ===
Wednesday, March 20, 1:00 pm

Sheet A	1	2	3	4	5	6	7	8	Final
(Manitoba) Gordon / Kurz	1	0	3	0	0	0	0	X	4
(Saskatchewan) (Alberta) Campbell / Morris 🔨	0	1	0	3	1	1	2	X	8

Sheet B	1	2	3	4	5	6	7	8	9	Final
(Ontario) Tuck / Tuck	2	0	0	0	2	0	0	1	2	7
(Ontario) Liscumb / Liscumb 🔨	0	2	1	1	0	1	0	0	0	5

Sheet C	1	2	3	4	5	6	7	8	Final
(Manitoba) Cameron / Carruthers 🔨	0	3	1	0	1	0	3	X	8
(Prince Edward Island) O'Connor / Abraham	1	0	0	1	0	1	0	X	3

Sheet D	1	2	3	4	5	6	7	8	Final
(Northern Ontario) Brunton / Leonard	1	0	1	2	0	0	0	X	4
(Alberta) Schmiemann / Ginter 🔨	0	4	0	0	2	1	2	X	9

Sheet F	1	2	3	4	5	6	7	8	Final
(Northwest Territories) Thomas / Aho	0	2	1	0	2	0	0	1	6
(Ontario) Jones / Laing 🔨	2	0	0	2	0	1	2	0	7

Sheet G	1	2	3	4	5	6	7	8	Final
(Manitoba) Sahaidak / Lott 🔨	4	1	1	1	1	0	X	X	8
(Quebec) Morissette / Morissette	0	0	0	0	0	2	X	X	2

Sheet H	1	2	3	4	5	6	7	8	Final
(Saskatchewan) Just / Kalthoff	2	0	0	0	1	1	0	X	4
(Saskatchewan) de Gooijer / Springer 🔨	0	3	1	3	0	0	1	X	8

Sheet I	1	2	3	4	5	6	7	8	Final
(Newfoundland and Labrador) Harvey / Thomas	0	0	0	0	0	1	X	X	1
(Saskatchewan) (British Columbia) Martin / Griffith 🔨	6	1	1	1	1	0	X	X	10

=== Draw 5 ===
Wednesday, March 20, 4:00 pm

Sheet A	1	2	3	4	5	6	7	8	9	Final
(British Columbia) Hawes / Tardi	3	0	1	0	1	0	2	0	1	8
(Quebec) Desjardins / Desjardins 🔨	0	2	0	2	0	1	0	2	0	7

Sheet B	1	2	3	4	5	6	7	8	Final
(Ontario) Cottrill / Cottrill 🔨	0	1	1	0	2	1	0	0	5
(British Columbia) Park / Tanaka	2	0	0	2	0	0	3	1	8

Sheet C	1	2	3	4	5	6	7	8	Final
(Manitoba) Groff / Doering 🔨	0	1	0	0	4	2	0	X	7
(Nunavut) Griffin / MacDonald	1	0	2	1	0	0	1	X	5

Sheet D	1	2	3	4	5	6	7	8	Final
(Manitoba) (Newfoundland and Labrador) Peterman / Gallant 🔨	4	0	2	0	0	4	X	X	10
(Saskatchewan) Streifel / Laycock	0	1	0	1	1	0	X	X	3

Sheet F	1	2	3	4	5	6	7	8	Final
(New Brunswick) Thompson / Sullivan	0	2	0	2	0	2	0	1	7
(Manitoba) (Saskatchewan) Birchard / Schneider 🔨	1	0	2	0	1	0	4	0	8

Sheet G	1	2	3	4	5	6	7	8	Final
(Saskatchewan) Kitz / Stewart	0	1	0	0	0	1	0	X	2
(Alberta) Broderson / Kleibrink 🔨	1	0	2	2	1	0	1	X	7

Sheet H	1	2	3	4	5	6	7	8	Final
(Nova Scotia) Jones / Everist 🔨	0	4	1	1	1	1	X	X	8
(Yukon) Thom / Thom	1	0	0	0	0	0	X	X	1

Sheet I	1	2	3	4	5	6	7	8	9	Final
(Alberta) (Saskatchewan) Walker / Muyres 🔨	2	2	0	0	1	0	3	0	3	11
(Alberta) Sauder / Bottcher	0	0	2	2	0	2	0	2	0	8

=== Draw 6 ===
Wednesday, March 20, 7:00 pm

Sheet A	1	2	3	4	5	6	7	8	Final
(Saskatchewan) de Gooijer / Springer	1	0	1	0	0	1	0	X	3
(Manitoba) Sahaidak / Lott 🔨	0	4	0	2	1	0	2	X	9

Sheet B	1	2	3	4	5	6	7	8	Final
(Saskatchewan) (British Columbia) Martin / Griffith	4	1	2	1	0	1	X	X	9
(Northwest Territories) Thomas / Aho 🔨	0	0	0	0	3	0	X	X	3

Sheet C	1	2	3	4	5	6	7	8	Final
(Quebec) Morissette / Morissette	2	0	0	2	0	3	0	1	8
(Newfoundland and Labrador) Harvey / Thomas 🔨	0	2	2	0	1	0	2	0	7

Sheet D	1	2	3	4	5	6	7	8	Final
(Ontario) Jones / Laing 🔨	4	0	0	1	0	2	0	X	7
(Saskatchewan) Just / Kalthoff	0	2	1	0	1	0	1	X	5

Sheet F	1	2	3	4	5	6	7	8	Final
(Prince Edward Island) O'Connor / Abraham	0	3	1	0	0	2	0	2	8
(Ontario) Tuck / Tuck 🔨	1	0	0	2	2	0	2	0	7

Sheet G	1	2	3	4	5	6	7	8	Final
(Alberta) Schmiemann / Ginter 🔨	0	4	0	2	0	0	3	0	9
(Manitoba) Gordon / Kurz	2	0	1	0	2	1	0	0	6

Sheet H	1	2	3	4	5	6	7	8	9	Final
(Ontario) Liscumb / Liscumb 🔨	4	0	0	2	0	2	1	0	0	9
(Northern Ontario) Brunton / Leonard	0	3	1	0	2	0	0	3	2	11

Sheet I	1	2	3	4	5	6	7	8	Final
(Saskatchewan) (Alberta) Campbell / Morris	0	1	0	3	1	0	2	1	8
(Manitoba) Cameron / Carruthers 🔨	1	0	2	0	0	1	0	0	4

=== Draw 7 ===
Thursday, March 21, 10:00 am

Sheet A	1	2	3	4	5	6	7	8	Final
(Alberta) Sauder / Bottcher	1	1	1	0	1	0	1	0	5
(Nova Scotia) Jones / Everist 🔨	0	0	0	1	0	2	0	1	4

Sheet B	1	2	3	4	5	6	7	8	Final
(Yukon) Thom / Thom	0	1	0	0	0	0	X	X	1
(Alberta) (Saskatchewan) Walker / Muyres 🔨	5	0	3	1	4	1	X	X	14

Sheet C	1	2	3	4	5	6	7	8	Final
(Manitoba) (Saskatchewan) Birchard / Schneider	0	2	1	0	0	4	0	4	11
(Saskatchewan) Kitz / Stewart 🔨	1	0	0	2	1	0	3	0	7

Sheet D	1	2	3	4	5	6	7	8	Final
(Alberta) Broderson / Kleibrink 🔨	2	0	3	1	0	3	0	2	11
(New Brunswick) Thompson / Sullivan	0	1	0	0	3	0	3	0	7

Sheet F	1	2	3	4	5	6	7	8	Final
(Saskatchewan) Streifel / Laycock	1	0	1	0	0	1	1	1	5
(Manitoba) Groff / Doering 🔨	0	1	0	2	1	0	0	0	4

Sheet G	1	2	3	4	5	6	7	8	Final
(Nunavut) Griffin / MacDonald	0	1	0	1	0	0	X	X	2
(Manitoba) (Newfoundland and Labrador) Peterman / Gallant 🔨	2	0	1	0	4	2	X	X	9

Sheet H	1	2	3	4	5	6	7	8	9	Final
(Quebec) Desjardins / Desjardins 🔨	1	0	1	1	0	3	0	0	1	7
(Ontario) Cottrill / Cottrill	0	3	0	0	1	0	1	1	0	6

Sheet I	1	2	3	4	5	6	7	8	Final
(British Columbia) Park / Tanaka 🔨	1	0	3	2	0	2	0	1	9
(British Columbia) Hawes / Tardi	0	3	0	0	1	0	3	0	7

=== Draw 8 ===
Thursday, March 21, 1:00 pm

Sheet A	1	2	3	4	5	6	7	8	Final
(Manitoba) Cameron / Carruthers	2	0	4	1	0	4	X	X	11
(Ontario) Liscumb / Liscumb 🔨	0	3	0	0	1	0	X	X	4

Sheet B	1	2	3	4	5	6	7	8	Final
(Northern Ontario) Brunton / Leonard 🔨	2	0	0	1	2	0	0	0	5
(Saskatchewan) (Alberta) Campbell / Morris	0	2	2	0	0	1	1	1	7

Sheet C	1	2	3	4	5	6	7	8	9	Final
(Ontario) Tuck / Tuck 🔨	0	0	0	1	0	1	0	3	1	6
(Alberta) Schmiemann / Ginter	1	1	1	0	1	0	1	0	0	5

Sheet D	1	2	3	4	5	6	7	8	Final
(Manitoba) Gordon / Kurz 🔨	2	3	0	1	0	0	3	X	9
(Prince Edward Island) O'Connor / Abraham	0	0	1	0	2	2	0	X	5

Sheet F	1	2	3	4	5	6	7	8	Final
(Saskatchewan) Just / Kalthoff	1	1	1	0	1	0	3	X	7
(Quebec) Morissette / Morissette 🔨	0	0	0	2	0	3	0	X	5

Sheet G	1	2	3	4	5	6	7	8	Final
(Newfoundland and Labrador) Harvey / Thomas	0	0	0	1	0	0	X	X	1
(Ontario) Jones / Laing 🔨	2	1	1	0	3	1	X	X	8

Sheet H	1	2	3	4	5	6	7	8	Final
(Manitoba) Sahaidak / Lott 🔨	0	0	0	0	2	1	0	X	3
(Saskatchewan) (British Columbia) Martin / Griffith	1	1	1	1	0	0	2	X	6

Sheet I	1	2	3	4	5	6	7	8	Final
(Northwest Territories) Thomas / Aho	0	2	0	1	0	2	0	0	5
(Saskatchewan) de Gooijer / Springer 🔨	1	0	3	0	2	0	3	2	11

=== Draw 9 ===
Thursday, March 21, 4:00 pm

Sheet A	1	2	3	4	5	6	7	8	Final
(Quebec) Desjardins / Desjardins 🔨	4	3	1	2	1	0	X	X	11
(Nunavut) Griffin / MacDonald	0	0	0	0	0	1	X	X	1

Sheet B	1	2	3	4	5	6	7	8	Final
(British Columbia) Park / Tanaka	0	2	0	0	4	1	1	X	8
(Saskatchewan) Streifel / Laycock 🔨	1	0	2	1	0	0	0	X	4

Sheet C	1	2	3	4	5	6	7	8	Final
(British Columbia) Hawes / Tardi	1	0	0	1	0	4	0	X	6
(Manitoba) (Newfoundland and Labrador) Peterman / Gallant 🔨	0	1	1	0	1	0	1	X	4

Sheet D	1	2	3	4	5	6	7	8	Final
(Ontario) Cottrill / Cottrill 🔨	0	0	0	0	3	3	2	X	8
(Manitoba) Groff / Doering	2	1	1	1	0	0	0	X	5

Sheet F	1	2	3	4	5	6	7	8	Final
(Manitoba) (Saskatchewan) Birchard / Schneider 🔨	5	1	1	2	1	1	X	X	11
(Yukon) Thom / Thom	0	0	0	0	0	0	X	X	0

Sheet G	1	2	3	4	5	6	7	8	Final
(Alberta) Broderson / Kleibrink	0	1	0	1	0	2	0	X	4
(Alberta) Sauder / Bottcher 🔨	2	0	2	0	3	0	3	X	10

Sheet H	1	2	3	4	5	6	7	8	Final
(New Brunswick) Thompson / Sullivan	0	3	0	2	0	2	1	1	9
(Alberta) (Saskatchewan) Walker / Muyres 🔨	1	0	3	0	2	0	0	0	6

Sheet I	1	2	3	4	5	6	7	8	Final
(Saskatchewan) Kitz / Stewart	0	2	0	1	0	1	1	2	7
(Nova Scotia) Jones / Everist 🔨	3	0	2	0	1	0	0	0	6

=== Draw 10 ===
Thursday, March 21, 7:00 pm

Sheet A	1	2	3	4	5	6	7	8	Final
(Manitoba) Sahaidak / Lott 🔨	5	1	2	0	2	0	X	X	10
(Newfoundland and Labrador) Harvey / Thomas	0	0	0	1	0	2	X	X	3

Sheet B	1	2	3	4	5	6	7	8	Final
(Northwest Territories) Thomas / Aho	0	0	0	3	1	0	1	1	6
(Saskatchewan) Just / Kalthoff 🔨	2	1	1	0	0	3	0	0	7

Sheet C	1	2	3	4	5	6	7	8	Final
(Saskatchewan) de Gooijer / Springer	0	1	0	0	3	0	2	0	6
(Ontario) Jones / Laing 🔨	1	0	2	1	0	1	0	3	8

Sheet D	1	2	3	4	5	6	7	8	Final
(Saskatchewan) (British Columbia) Martin / Griffith 🔨	0	3	1	0	0	3	0	0	7
(Quebec) Morissette / Morissette	1	0	0	2	1	0	3	1	8

Sheet F	1	2	3	4	5	6	7	8	Final
(Ontario) Tuck / Tuck	2	0	3	0	2	1	0	X	8
(Northern Ontario) Brunton / Leonard 🔨	0	1	0	1	0	0	2	X	4

Sheet G	1	2	3	4	5	6	7	8	9	Final
(Manitoba) Gordon / Kurz	0	0	1	0	2	0	4	0	2	9
(Manitoba) Cameron / Carruthers 🔨	1	1	0	2	0	1	0	2	0	7

Sheet H	1	2	3	4	5	6	7	8	Final
(Prince Edward Island) O'Connor / Abraham 🔨	0	0	1	0	2	0	X	X	3
(Saskatchewan) (Alberta) Campbell / Morris	1	1	0	4	0	4	X	X	10

Sheet I	1	2	3	4	5	6	7	8	Final
(Alberta) Schmiemann / Ginter 🔨	1	0	3	0	0	1	0	1	6
(Ontario) Liscumb / Liscumb	0	1	0	1	1	0	2	0	5

=== Draw 11 ===
Friday, March 22, 10:00 am

Sheet A	1	2	3	4	5	6	7	8	Final
(Alberta) (Saskatchewan) Walker / Muyres 🔨	2	1	0	1	0	3	0	X	7
(Saskatchewan) Kitz / Stewart	0	0	1	0	1	0	1	X	3

Sheet B	1	2	3	4	5	6	7	8	Final
(New Brunswick) Thompson / Sullivan 🔨	2	0	0	2	0	1	0	1	6
(Nova Scotia) Jones / Everist	0	1	1	0	2	0	1	0	5

Sheet C	1	2	3	4	5	6	7	8	Final
(Yukon) Thom / Thom	0	0	0	1	0	1	X	X	2
(Alberta) Broderson / Kleibrink 🔨	4	1	2	0	2	0	X	X	9

Sheet D	1	2	3	4	5	6	7	8	Final
(Alberta) Sauder / Bottcher	0	2	1	1	1	0	1	1	7
(Manitoba) (Saskatchewan) Birchard / Schneider 🔨	2	0	0	0	0	1	0	0	3

Sheet F	1	2	3	4	5	6	7	8	Final
(Manitoba) (Newfoundland and Labrador) Peterman / Gallant 🔨	0	0	0	3	0	2	1	0	6
(Ontario) Cottrill / Cottrill	1	1	1	0	1	0	0	1	5

Sheet G	1	2	3	4	5	6	7	8	Final
(British Columbia) Hawes / Tardi 🔨	2	2	1	3	0	0	X	X	8
(Manitoba) Groff / Doering	0	0	0	0	1	1	X	X	2

Sheet H	1	2	3	4	5	6	7	8	Final
(Nunavut) Griffin / MacDonald 🔨	2	0	1	1	0	0	0	0	5
(British Columbia) Park / Tanaka	0	1	0	0	1	2	1	1	6

Sheet I	1	2	3	4	5	6	7	8	Final
(Saskatchewan) Streifel / Laycock	0	0	1	0	2	0	4	1	8
(Quebec) Desjardins / Desjardins 🔨	1	1	0	3	0	2	0	0	7

=== Draw 12 ===
Friday, March 22, 1:00 pm

Sheet A	1	2	3	4	5	6	7	8	Final
(Saskatchewan) (Alberta) Campbell / Morris	0	3	1	0	1	0	2	0	7
(Alberta) Schmiemann / Ginter 🔨	1	0	0	2	0	1	0	2	6

Sheet B	1	2	3	4	5	6	7	8	Final
(Prince Edward Island) O'Connor / Abraham	0	1	0	0	3	0	0	X	4
(Ontario) Liscumb / Liscumb 🔨	1	0	4	1	0	1	2	X	9

Sheet C	1	2	3	4	5	6	7	8	Final
(Northern Ontario) Brunton / Leonard	0	0	0	1	0	0	X	X	1
(Manitoba) Gordon / Kurz 🔨	5	3	2	0	4	1	X	X	15

Sheet D	1	2	3	4	5	6	7	8	Final
(Manitoba) Cameron / Carruthers	0	0	2	0	2	0	4	0	8
(Ontario) Tuck / Tuck 🔨	3	1	0	2	0	2	0	4	12

Sheet F	1	2	3	4	5	6	7	8	Final
(Ontario) Jones / Laing 🔨	0	0	0	2	0	0	1	X	3
(Saskatchewan) (British Columbia) Martin / Griffith	1	2	2	0	1	1	0	X	7

Sheet G	1	2	3	4	5	6	7	8	Final
(Saskatchewan) de Gooijer / Springer	1	1	1	1	X	X	X	X	4
(Quebec) Morissette / Morissette 🔨	0	0	0	0	X	X	X	X	0

Sheet H	1	2	3	4	5	6	7	8	Final
(Newfoundland and Labrador) Harvey / Thomas 🔨	3	0	1	0	0	0	0	X	4
(Northwest Territories) Thomas / Aho	0	1	0	3	1	1	2	X	8

Sheet I	1	2	3	4	5	6	7	8	Final
(Saskatchewan) Just / Kalthoff	0	0	1	0	1	1	0	0	3
(Manitoba) Sahaidak / Lott 🔨	2	1	0	1	0	0	1	2	7

=== Draw 13 ===
Friday, March 22, 4:00 pm

Sheet A	1	2	3	4	5	6	7	8	Final
(Manitoba) Groff / Doering 🔨	1	0	2	1	1	0	1	0	6
(British Columbia) Park / Tanaka	0	1	0	0	0	3	0	1	5

Sheet B	1	2	3	4	5	6	7	8	Final
(Manitoba) (Newfoundland and Labrador) Peterman / Gallant 🔨	0	4	0	0	3	2	0	2	11
(Quebec) Desjardins / Desjardins	1	0	5	1	0	0	2	0	9

Sheet C	1	2	3	4	5	6	7	8	Final
(Ontario) Cottrill / Cottrill 🔨	0	0	0	2	0	1	0	X	3
(Saskatchewan) Streifel / Laycock	2	2	1	0	2	0	2	X	9

Sheet D	1	2	3	4	5	6	7	8	Final
(British Columbia) Hawes / Tardi	1	1	1	0	4	3	X	X	10
(Nunavut) Griffin / MacDonald 🔨	0	0	0	1	0	0	X	X	1

Sheet F	1	2	3	4	5	6	7	8	Final
(Nova Scotia) Jones / Everist 🔨	0	0	1	0	0	5	0	0	6
(Alberta) Broderson / Kleibrink	1	2	0	1	1	0	3	1	9

Sheet G	1	2	3	4	5	6	7	8	Final
(Alberta) (Saskatchewan) Walker / Muyres 🔨	3	1	0	0	1	0	4	X	9
(Manitoba) (Saskatchewan) Birchard / Schneider	0	0	1	1	0	2	0	X	4

Sheet H	1	2	3	4	5	6	7	8	Final
(Saskatchewan) Kitz / Stewart 🔨	0	1	0	3	0	3	0	1	8
(Alberta) Sauder / Bottcher	1	0	2	0	1	0	3	0	7

Sheet I	1	2	3	4	5	6	7	8	Final
(New Brunswick) Thompson / Sullivan 🔨	2	2	1	3	1	2	X	X	11
(Yukon) Thom / Thom	0	0	0	0	0	0	X	X	0

=== Draw 14 ===
Friday, March 22, 7:00 pm

Sheet A	1	2	3	4	5	6	7	8	Final
(Quebec) Morissette / Morissette	0	2	1	0	1	0	1	X	5
(Northwest Territories) Thomas / Aho 🔨	4	0	0	1	0	2	0	X	7

Sheet B	1	2	3	4	5	6	7	8	9	Final
(Ontario) Jones / Laing 🔨	0	1	1	0	2	0	2	0	0	6
(Manitoba) Sahaidak / Lott	1	0	0	2	0	1	0	2	2	8

Sheet C	1	2	3	4	5	6	7	8	Final
(Saskatchewan) (British Columbia) Martin / Griffith 🔨	0	4	1	4	0	2	0	X	11
(Saskatchewan) Just / Kalthoff	3	0	0	0	1	0	2	X	6

Sheet D	1	2	3	4	5	6	7	8	Final
(Saskatchewan) de Gooijer / Springer 🔨	0	1	0	1	0	4	2	X	8
(Newfoundland and Labrador) Harvey / Thomas	1	0	1	0	1	0	0	X	3

Sheet F	1	2	3	4	5	6	7	8	Final
(Ontario) Liscumb / Liscumb	0	4	0	1	0	2	0	0	7
(Manitoba) Gordon / Kurz 🔨	1	0	2	0	3	0	2	1	9

Sheet G	1	2	3	4	5	6	7	8	Final
(Saskatchewan) (Alberta) Campbell / Morris	0	1	0	2	0	2	0	X	5
(Ontario) Tuck / Tuck 🔨	1	0	2	0	2	0	3	X	8

Sheet H	1	2	3	4	5	6	7	8	Final
(Alberta) Schmiemann / Ginter 🔨	1	0	0	1	0	3	0	0	5
(Manitoba) Cameron / Carruthers	0	3	2	0	1	0	1	1	8

Sheet I	1	2	3	4	5	6	7	8	Final
(Prince Edward Island) O'Connor / Abraham	2	0	2	0	1	1	0	1	7
(Northern Ontario) Brunton / Leonard 🔨	0	1	0	2	0	0	1	0	4

== Playoffs ==
Round of 12
8	(Ontario) Tuck / Tuck	3
9	(Alberta) Sauder / Bottcher	9
5	(Manitoba) (Newfoundland and Labrador) Peterman / Gallant	12
12	(British Columbia) Park / Tanaka	3
7	(Ontario) Jones / Laing	2
10	(Manitoba) (Saskatchewan) Birchard / Schneider	8
6	(Manitoba) Sahaidak / Lott	7
11	(Manitoba) Gordon / Kurz	4

Quarterfinals
9	(Alberta) Sauder / Bottcher	3
1	(Alberta) (Saskatchewan) Walker / Muyres	9
5	(Manitoba) (Newfoundland and Labrador) Peterman / Gallant	9
4	(Saskatchewan) (Alberta) Campbell / Morris	1
10	(Manitoba) (Saskatchewan) Birchard / Schneider	6
2	(Saskatchewan) (British Columbia) Martin / Griffith	7
6	(Manitoba) Sahaidak / Lott	7
3	(British Columbia) Hawes / Tardi	4

Semifinals
1	(Alberta) (Saskatchewan) Walker / Muyres	5
5	(Manitoba) (Newfoundland and Labrador) Peterman / Gallant	6
2	(Saskatchewan) (British Columbia) Martin / Griffith	7
6	(Manitoba) Sahaidak / Lott	6

Final
5	(Manitoba) (Newfoundland and Labrador) Peterman / Gallant	9
2	(Saskatchewan) (British Columbia) Martin / Griffith	6

=== Round of 12 ===
Saturday, March 23, 2:00 pm

Sheet A	1	2	3	4	5	6	7	8	Final
(Ontario) Tuck / Tuck	0	0	1	0	2	0	0	X	3
(Alberta) Sauder / Bottcher 🔨	2	2	0	2	0	1	2	X	9

Sheet B	1	2	3	4	5	6	7	8	Final
(Manitoba) Sahaidak / Lott 🔨	0	0	1	1	1	1	0	3	7
(Manitoba) Gordon / Kurz	2	1	0	0	0	0	1	0	4

Sheet C	1	2	3	4	5	6	7	8	Final
(Ontario) Jones / Laing 🔨	0	1	0	1	0	0	X	X	2
(Manitoba) (Saskatchewan) Birchard / Schneider	3	0	1	0	1	3	X	X	8

Sheet D	1	2	3	4	5	6	7	8	Final
(Manitoba) (Newfoundland and Labrador) Peterman / Gallant 🔨	4	0	3	0	4	1	X	X	12
(British Columbia) Park / Tanaka	0	1	0	2	0	0	X	X	3

=== Quarterfinals ===
Saturday, March 23, 7:00 pm

Sheet A	1	2	3	4	5	6	7	8	Final
(Manitoba) (Newfoundland and Labrador) Peterman / Gallant 🔨	3	2	0	2	1	1	X	X	9
(Saskatchewan) (Alberta) Campbell / Morris	0	0	1	0	0	0	X	X	1

Sheet B	1	2	3	4	5	6	7	8	Final
(Manitoba) (Saskatchewan) Birchard / Schneider	0	1	0	1	1	0	3	0	6
(Saskatchewan) (British Columbia) Martin / Griffith 🔨	1	0	1	0	0	2	0	3	7

Sheet C	1	2	3	4	5	6	7	8	Final
(Alberta) Sauder / Bottcher	0	0	2	0	1	0	X	X	3
(Alberta) (Saskatchewan) Walker / Muyres 🔨	3	3	0	1	0	2	X	X	9

Sheet D	1	2	3	4	5	6	7	8	Final
(Manitoba) Sahaidak / Lott	1	0	2	0	1	3	0	X	7
(British Columbia) Hawes / Tardi 🔨	0	2	0	1	0	0	1	X	4

=== Semifinals ===
Sunday, March 24, 10:00 am

Sheet B	1	2	3	4	5	6	7	8	Final
(Alberta) (Saskatchewan) Walker / Muyres 🔨	1	0	1	0	0	2	0	1	5
(Manitoba) (Newfoundland and Labrador) Peterman / Gallant	0	1	0	2	2	0	1	0	6

Sheet C	1	2	3	4	5	6	7	8	Final
(Saskatchewan) (British Columbia) Martin / Griffith 🔨	0	4	1	0	1	0	0	1	7
(Manitoba) Sahaidak / Lott	2	0	0	1	0	2	1	0	6

=== Final ===
Sunday, March 24, 3:00 pm

Sheet C	1	2	3	4	5	6	7	8	Final
(Manitoba) (Newfoundland and Labrador) Peterman / Gallant 🔨	2	0	1	0	0	5	0	1	9
(Saskatchewan) (British Columbia) Martin / Griffith	0	1	0	1	1	0	3	0	6
