= Kadriana Lott =

Canadian curler (born 1999)

- Curler
- Born: Kadriana Sahaidak; May 12, 1999 (age 27); Selkirk, Manitoba

Team
- Curling club: Gimli CC, Gimli, MB; Winnipeg Beach CC, Winnipeg Beach, MB
- Skip: Nancy Martin
- Third: Chaelynn Stewart
- Second: Kadriana Lott
- Lead: Makenna Hadway
- Mixed doubles partner: Colton Lott

Curling career
- Member Association: Manitoba (2018–2024); Saskatchewan (2024–present)
- Hearts: 1 (2025)
- World Mixed Doubles Championship: 2 (2024, 2026)
- Top CTRS ranking: 16th (2024–25)
Medal record
Curling
Representing Canada
World Mixed Doubles Championship
Bronze medal – third place	2026 Geneva
Representing Manitoba
Canadian Mixed Doubles Championship
Gold medal – first place	2024 Fredericton
Gold medal – first place	2025 Summerside
Silver medal – second place	2018 Leduc
Silver medal – second place	2021 Calgary
Bronze medal – third place	2019 Fredericton

Kadriana Lott (born May 12, 1999 as Kadriana Sahaidak) is a Canadian curler from Gimli, Manitoba. She is best known for playing mixed doubles curling with partner Colton Lott, who she has won four medals with at the Canadian Mixed Doubles Curling Championship. She also plays second on Team Nancy Martin in women's curling.

== Career ==
=== Mixed doubles ===
Lott has found success in mixed doubles with husband Colton Lott. Their first competitive event was the 2018 Manitoba Mixed Doubles Curling Championship, which they won, giving them a berth in the 2018 Canadian Mixed Doubles Curling Championship. The duo was the youngest in the tournament, and the only to go undefeated through the round robin. However, they lost the final 8–7 to Laura Crocker and Kirk Muyres.

Lott and her husband were chosen as Canada's representative at the Third Leg of the 2018–19 Curling World Cup. They won the event, gaining an entry to the Grand Final. At the 2019 Canadians, the pair made it to the semi-finals, which they lost 7–6. Lott and her husband won the 2024 Canadian Mixed Doubles Curling Championship, and represented Canada at the 2024 World Mixed Doubles Curling Championship. At the Worlds, the team finished 8–1 after round robin play, but lost to Estonia's Marie Kaldvee and Harri Lill in the Qualification Round, finishing 5th.

By virtue of their 2024 Canadian Championship title, Lott and Lott qualified for the 2025 Canadian Mixed Doubles Curling Olympic Trials, where the team had a disappointing 4–3 record, missing the playoffs. However, they would rebound by winning the 2025 Canadian Mixed Doubles Curling Championship over Marlee Powers and Luke Saunders 9–8 in the final, qualifying them to represent Canada at the 2026 World Mixed Doubles Curling Championship. There, they would finish round robin play with an 8–1 record, winning their pool and earning a spot in the semifinals. After losing to Sweden in the semifinals, they would rebound to win bronze, beating Italy's Stefania Constantini and Amos Mosaner 11–3 in the bronze medal game.

== Personal life ==
Lott works as an optometric assistant at Oakley Vision Centre. She married mixed doubles partner Colton Lott in August 2022.
