= 2018 Canadian Mixed Doubles Curling Championship =

- Host city: Leduc, Alberta
- Arena: Ken's Furniture Arena & Robinson Arena
- Dates: March 28–April 1
- Winner: (Saskatchewan) (Alberta) Crocker/Muyres
- Female: Laura Crocker
- Male: Kirk Muyres
- Finalist: (Manitoba) Sahaidak/Lott

The 2018 Canadian Mixed Doubles Curling Championship was held from March 28 to April 1 at Ken's Furniture Arena and Robinson Arena in Leduc, Alberta

== Teams ==
The teams are listed as follows:

=== Provincial and Territorial champions ===
Province / Territory	Male	Female	Clubs(s)
Alberta	Karsten Sturmay	Selena Sturmay	Saville Community Sports Centre, Edmonton
British Columbia	Nicholas Meister	Megan Daniels	Langley Curling Club & Delta Thistle Curling Club
Manitoba	Colton Lott	Kadriana Sahaidak	Winnipeg Beach Curling Club, Gimli
New Brunswick	Alex Robichaud	Julia Hunter	Sackville Curling Club, Sackville
Newfoundland and Labrador	Evan Kearley	Megan Kearley	St. John's Curling Club, St. John's
Northern Ontario	Trevor Bonot	Amanda Gates	Port Arthur Curling Club & Idylwylde Golf and Country Club
Nova Scotia	Bryce Everist	Karlee Jones	Mayflower Curling Club, Halifax
Northwest Territories	David Aho	Carina McKay-Saturnino	Inuvik Curling Club & Yellowknife Curling Club
Ontario	Wayne Tuck Jr.	Kimberly Tuck	Ilderton Curling Club, Ilderton
Prince Edward Island	Calvin Smith	Lauren Ferguson	Crapaud Community Curling Club, Crapaud
Quebec	Jesse Mullen	Roxane Perron	Etchemin / Victoria / Kénogami
Saskatchewan	Brayden Stewart	Chaelynn Kitz	Sutherland Curling Club & Oxbow Curling Club
Yukon	Robert Smallwood	Jody Smallwood	Whitehorse Curling Club, Whitehorse, Yukon

=== Open entries ===
Province / Territory	Male	Female
Ontario	Brent Laing	Jennifer Jones
Manitoba; Alberta	Colin Hodgson	Chelsea Carey
Manitoba; Alberta	Reid Carruthers	Joanne Courtney
Quebec	Robert Desjardins	Émilie Desjardins
Alberta	Charley Thomas	Kalynn Park
Ontario	Shawn Cottrill	Katie Cottrill
Manitoba; Alberta	Derek Samagalski	Jocelyn Peterman
Ontario; Alberta	John Epping	Dana Ferguson
Manitoba	Jason Gunnlaugson	Theresa Cannon
Ontario	Hugh Murphy	Janet Murphy
Alberta; Saskatchewan	Ryan Deis	Sherry Just
Saskatchewan; Alberta	Kirk Muyres	Laura Crocker
Manitoba	Matt Dunstone	Cathy Overton-Clapham
Manitoba	Kyle Doering	Ashley Groff
Saskatchewan	Dustin Kalthoff	Marliese Kasner
Manitoba	Ray Baker	Lisa Hale-Menard
Saskatchewan	Steve Laycock	Nancy Martin
Ontario	Chris Liscumb	Catherine Liscumb
Ontario; Alberta	Tim March	Valerie Sweeting

== Round-robin standings ==
Key
Teams to Playoffs
Teams to Tiebreaker

Pool A	W	L
(Alberta) (Saskatchewan) Crocker / Muyres	6	1
(Alberta) Park / Thomas	5	2
(Quebec) Desjardins / Desjardins	5	2
(Saskatchewan) Martin / Laycock	4	3
(British Columbia) Daniels / Meister	3	4
(Newfoundland and Labrador) Kearley / Kearley	2	5
(Saskatchewan) (Alberta) Just / Deis	2	5
(Northwest Territories) McKay-Saturnio / Aho	1	6

Pool B	W	L
(Manitoba) Sahaidak / Lott	7	0
(Alberta) (Manitoba) Carey / Hodgson	6	1
(Northern Ontario) Gates / Bonot	4	3
(Manitoba) Cannon / Gunnlaugson	3	4
(Quebec) Perron / Mullen	2	5
(Ontario) Cottrill / Cottrill	2	5
(Manitoba) Groff / Doering	2	5
(Yukon) Smallwood / Smallwood	2	5

Pool C	W	L
(Saskatchewan) Kitz / Stewart	5	2
(Ontario) Jones / Laing	5	2
(Alberta) (Manitoba) Peterman / Samagalski	5	2
(Alberta) (Ontario) Sweeting / March	5	2
(Alberta) Sturmay / Sturmay	3	4
(Alberta) (Ontario) Ferguson / Epping	2	5
(Saskatchewan) Kasner / Kalthoff	2	5
(Prince Edward Island) Ferguson / Smith	1	6

Pool D	W	L
(Alberta) (Manitoba) Courtney / Carruthers	6	1
(Manitoba) Overton-Clapham / Dunstone	5	2
(Ontario) Murphy / Murphy	5	2
(Nova Scotia) Jones / Everist	4	3
(New Brunswick) Hunter / Robichaud	3	4
(Ontario) Tuck / Tuck	3	4
(Ontario) Liscumb / Liscumb	2	5
(Manitoba) Hale-Menard / Baker	0	7

=== Draw 1 ===
Wednesday, March 28, 6:00 pm

Sheet A	1	2	3	4	5	6	7	8	Final
(Alberta) (Saskatchewan) Crocker/Muyres	1	2	2	1	0	2	2	X	10
(Newfoundland and Labrador) Kearley/Kearley	0	0	0	0	2	0	0	X	2

Sheet B	1	2	3	4	5	6	7	8	Final
(Saskatchewan) Martin/Laycock	3	0	2	0	0	2	0	1	8
(Saskatchewan) Just/Deis	0	3	0	2	1	0	1	0	7

Sheet C	1	2	3	4	5	6	7	8	Final
(Northwest Territories) McKay-Saturnino/Aho	1	0	1	0	2	0	0	X	4
(Quebec) Desjardins/Desjardins	0	3	0	1	1	0	5	X	10

Sheet D	1	2	3	4	5	6	7	8	Final
(Alberta) Park/Thomas	1	0	1	0	1	0	1	0	4
(British Columbia) Daniels/Meister	0	2	0	2	0	1	0	2	7

Sheet E	1	2	3	4	5	6	7	8	Final
(Manitoba) Groff/Doering	3	0	1	0	1	0	1	0	6
(Quebec) Perron/Mullen	0	2	0	2	0	3	0	1	8

Sheet F	1	2	3	4	5	6	7	8	Final
(Yukon) Smallwood/Smallwood	1	0	1	0	0	0	1	X	3
(Alberta) (Manitoba) Carey/Hodgson	0	1	0	2	2	1	0	X	6

Sheet G	1	2	3	4	5	6	7	8	Final
(Northern Ontario) Ganes/Bonot	4	1	1	0	0	2	2	X	10
(Manitoba) Cannon/Gunnlaugson	0	0	0	1	1	0	0	X	2

Sheet H	1	2	3	4	5	6	7	8	Final
(Manitoba) Sahaidak/Lott	2	1	1	2	0	2	0	X	8
(Ontario) Cottrill/Cottrill	0	0	0	0	4	0	1	X	5

=== Draw 2 ===
Wednesday, March 28, 8:30 pm

Sheet A	1	2	3	4	5	6	7	8	Final
(Alberta) (Ontario) Sweeting/March	0	1	1	1	0	0	1	1	5
(Alberta) Sturmay/Sturmay	2	0	0	0	1	1	0	0	4

Sheet B	1	2	3	4	5	6	7	8	9	Final
(Saskatchewan) Kitz/Stewart	3	0	2	0	1	0	1	0	1	8
(Alberta) (Ontario) Ferguson/Epping	0	2	0	2	0	2	0	1	0	7

Sheet C	1	2	3	4	5	6	7	8	Final
(Prince Edward Island) Ferguson/Smith	0	1	0	1	1	0	X	X	3
(Ontario) Jones/Laing	3	0	4	0	0	3	X	X	10

Sheet D	1	2	3	4	5	6	7	8	Final
(Manitoba) (Alberta) Peterman/Samagalski	0	5	2	0	0	3	3	X	13
(Saskatchewan) Kasner/Kalthoff	1	0	0	1	2	0	0	X	4

Sheet E	1	2	3	4	5	6	7	8	9	Final
(Manitoba) Overton-Clapham/Dunstone	0	1	0	1	1	1	0	1	0	5
(New Brunswick) Hunter/Robichaud	1	0	2	0	0	0	2	0	1	6

Sheet F	1	2	3	4	5	6	7	8	Final
(Nova Scotia) Jones/Everist	1	0	1	0	3	0	1	X	6
(Alberta) (Manitoba) Courtney/Carruthers	0	5	0	1	0	3	0	X	9

Sheet G	1	2	3	4	5	6	7	8	Final
(Ontario) Liscumb/Liscumb	1	0	0	0	0	1	0	X	2
(Ontario) Murphy/Murphy	0	1	1	4	1	0	1	X	8

Sheet H	1	2	3	4	5	6	7	8	Final
(Ontario) Tuck/Tuck	1	1	1	0	3	3	X	X	9
(Ontario) Hale-Menard/Baker	0	0	0	1	0	0	X	X	1

=== Draw 3 ===
Thursday, March 29, 8:30 am

Sheet A	1	2	3	4	5	6	7	8	Final
(Northern Ontario) Gates/Bonot	0	0	1	0	1	0	0	X	2
(Alberta) (Manitoba) Carey/Hodgson	2	1	0	1	0	2	1	X	7

Sheet B	1	2	3	4	5	6	7	8	9	Final
(Manitoba) Groff/Doering	0	1	0	0	2	1	0	1	0	5
(Manitoba) Sahaidak/Lott	2	0	1	1	0	0	1	0	1	6

Sheet C	1	2	3	4	5	6	7	8	Final
(Ontario) Cottrill/Cottrill	0	0	0	1	0	2	0	X	3
(Quebec) Perron/Mullen	2	2	3	0	0	0	2	X	9

Sheet D	1	2	3	4	5	6	7	8	9	Final
(Yukon) Smallwood/Smallwood	0	0	0	1	1	0	5	0	1	8
(Manitoba) Cannon/Gunnlaguson	1	2	1	0	0	1	0	2	0	7

Sheet E	1	2	3	4	5	6	7	8	9	Final
(Saskatchewan) Martin/Laycock	0	3	1	0	2	1	0	1	0	8
(Quebec) Desjardins/Desjardins	2	0	0	2	0	0	4	0	1	9

Sheet F	1	2	3	4	5	6	7	8	Final
(Alberta) (Saskatchewan) Crocker/Muyres	2	0	2	2	0	2	0	X	8
(British Columbia) Daniels/Meister	0	1	0	0	1	0	1	X	3

Sheet G	1	2	3	4	5	6	7	8	Final
(Alberta) Park/Thomas	1	0	1	2	0	2	0	X	6
(Newfoundland and Labrador) Kearley/Kearley	0	1	0	0	2	0	1	X	4

Sheet H	1	2	3	4	5	6	7	8	Final
(Northwest Territories) McKay-Saturnino/Aho	1	0	0	1	1	0	1	X	4
(Saskatchewan) Just/Deis	0	1	3	0	0	4	0	X	8

=== Draw 4 ===
Thursday, March 29, 11:00 am

Sheet A	1	2	3	4	5	6	7	8	Final
(Ontario) Liscumb/Liscumb	0	2	0	2	0	1	0	X	5
(Alberta) (Manitoba) Courtney/Carruthers	3	0	1	0	4	0	3	X	11

Sheet B	1	2	3	4	5	6	7	8	Final
(Manitoba) Overton-Clapham/Dunstone	4	2	3	1	0	0	X	X	10
(Manitoba) Hale-Menard/Baker	0	0	0	0	1	1	X	X	2

Sheet C	1	2	3	4	5	6	7	8	Final
(Ontario) Tuck/Tuck	0	2	0	0	0	2	0	0	4
(New Brunswick) Hunter/Robichaud	1	0	1	1	2	0	3	1	9

Sheet D	1	2	3	4	5	6	7	8	9	Final
(Nova Scotia) Jones/Everist	1	0	0	1	1	1	0	1	0	5
(Ontario) Murphy/Murphy	0	2	2	0	0	0	1	0	2	7

Sheet E	1	2	3	4	5	6	7	8	Final
(Saskatchewan) Kitz/Stewart	0	1	2	0	3	0	0	1	7
(Ontario) Jones/Laing	1	0	0	1	0	3	1	0	6

Sheet F	1	2	3	4	5	6	7	8	Final
(Alberta) (Ontario) Sweeting/March	4	0	4	2	2	0	X	X	12
(Saskatchewan) Kasner/Kalthoff	0	2	0	0	0	2	X	X	4

Sheet G	1	2	3	4	5	6	7	8	Final
(Manitoba) (Alberta) Peterman/Samagalski	3	0	2	2	0	1	1	X	9
(Alberta) Sturmay/Sturmay	0	3	0	0	1	0	0	X	4

Sheet H	1	2	3	4	5	6	7	8	9	Final
(Prince Edward Island) Ferguson/Smith	0	1	0	4	0	0	0	1	3	9
(Alberta) (Ontario) Ferguson/Epping	1	0	1	0	2	1	1	0	0	6

=== Draw 5 ===
Thursday, March 29, 1:30 pm

Sheet A	1	2	3	4	5	6	7	8	Final
(Alberta) Park/Thomas	0	2	0	0	1	1	0	4	8
(Northwest Territories) McKay-Saturnino/Aho	0	0	3	1	0	0	1	0	5

Sheet B	1	2	3	4	5	6	7	8	Final
(Newfoundland and Labrador) Kearley/Kearley	2	0	0	3	1	0	2	0	8
(Quebec) Desjardins/Desjardins	0	1	2	0	0	4	0	2	9

Sheet C	1	2	3	4	5	6	7	8	Final
(British Columbia) Daniels/Meister	0	0	0	1	0	1	1	X	3
(Saskatchewan) Just/Deis	1	1	1	0	3	0	0	X	6

Sheet D	1	2	3	4	5	6	7	8	Final
(Alberta) (Saskatchewan) Crocker/Muyres	1	1	0	0	1	1	1	1	6
(Saskatchewan) Martin/Laycock	0	0	2	1	0	0	0	0	3

Sheet E	1	2	3	4	5	6	7	8	Final
(Ontario) Cottrill/Cottrill	0	1	0	4	2	1	1	X	9
(Yukon) Smallwood/Smallwood	1	0	1	0	0	0	0	X	2

Sheet F	1	2	3	4	5	6	7	8	Final
(Manitoba) Cannon/Gunnlaugson	0	0	0	0	2	0	X	X	2
(Manitoba) Sahaidak/Lott	1	2	1	2	0	2	X	X	8

Sheet G	1	2	3	4	5	6	7	8	Final
(Quebec) Perron/Mullen	0	1	0	0	0	1	X	X	2
(Alberta) (Manitoba) Carey/Hodgson	4	0	3	2	2	0	X	X	11

Sheet H	1	2	3	4	5	6	7	8	Final
(Northern Ontario) Gates/Bonot	1	0	1	1	0	1	1	0	5
(Manitoba) Groff/Doering	0	2	0	0	2	0	0	2	6

=== Draw 6 ===
Thursday, March 29, 4:00 pm

Sheet A	1	2	3	4	5	6	7	8	Final
(Manitoba) (Alberta) Peterman/Samagalski	2	2	0	5	0	2	X	X	11
(Prince Edward Island) Ferguson/Smith	0	0	1	0	1	0	X	X	2

Sheet B	1	2	3	4	5	6	7	8	Final
(Alberta) Sturmay/Sturmay	0	0	2	2	0	3	0	1	8
(Ontario) Jones/Laing	1	1	0	0	1	0	3	0	6

Sheet C	1	2	3	4	5	6	7	8	9	Final
(Saskatchewan) Kasner/Kalthoff	0	1	1	1	0	1	0	1	0	5
(Alberta) (Ontario) Ferguson/Epping	1	0	0	0	2	0	2	0	3	8

Sheet D	1	2	3	4	5	6	7	8	Final
(Alberta) (Ontario) Sweeting/March	5	0	1	0	0	0	1	1	8
(Saskatchewan) Kitz/Stewart	0	1	0	3	1	1	0	0	6

Sheet E	1	2	3	4	5	6	7	8	Final
(Ontario) Tuck/Tuck	3	1	0	0	0	0	1	0	5
(Nova Scotia) Jones/Everist	0	0	2	1	1	2	0	1	7

Sheet F	1	2	3	4	5	6	7	8	Final
(Manitoba) Hale-Menard/Baker	0	4	1	0	0	1	0	0	6
(Ontario) Murphy/Murphy	2	0	0	3	3	0	2	1	11

Sheet G	1	2	3	4	5	6	7	8	Final
(New Brunswick) Hunter/Robichaud	1	0	1	0	1	0	2	X	5
(Alberta) (Manitoba) Courtney/Carruthers	0	2	0	3	0	3	0	X	8

Sheet H	1	2	3	4	5	6	7	8	Final
(Manitoba) Overton-Clapham/Dunstone	3	1	4	0	0	3	X	X	11
(Ontario) Liscumb/Liscumb	0	0	0	3	1	0	X	X	4

=== Draw 7 ===
Thursday, March 29, 6:30 pm

Sheet A	1	2	3	4	5	6	7	8	Final
(Ontario) Cottrill/Cottrill	0	0	1	1	2	1	0	0	5
(Manitoba) Groff/Doering	1	1	0	0	0	0	1	1	4

Sheet B	1	2	3	4	5	6	7	8	Final
(Northern Ontario) Gates/Bonot	3	0	2	0	1	2	2	0	10
(Yukon) Smallwood/Smallwood	0	1	0	2	0	0	0	X	3

Sheet C	1	2	3	4	5	6	7	8	Final
(Alberta) (Manitoba) Carey/Hodgson	0	1	1	1	0	1	0	4	8
(Manitoba) Cannon/Gunnlaugson	2	0	0	0	2	0	1	0	5

Sheet D	1	2	3	4	5	6	7	8	Final
(Manitoba) Sahaidak/Lott	0	2	4	3	0	0	2	X	11
(Quebec) Perron/Mullen	1	0	0	0	3	3	0	X	7

Sheet E	1	2	3	4	5	6	7	8	Final
(Alberta) Park/Thomas	0	1	1	1	1	0	0	0	4
(Alberta) (Saskatchewan) Crocker/Muyres	2	0	0	0	0	1	1	1	5

Sheet F	1	2	3	4	5	6	7	8	Final
(Saskatchewan) Martin/Laycock	4	1	0	3	2	0	X	X	10
(Northwest Territories) McKay-Saturnino/Aho	0	0	1	0	0	1	X	X	2

Sheet G	1	2	3	4	5	6	7	8	Final
(Quebec) Desjardins/Desjardins	1	0	3	1	1	0	2	X	8
(Saskatchewan) Just/Deis	0	2	0	0	0	1	0	X	3

Sheet H	1	2	3	4	5	6	7	8	Final
(British Columbia) Daniels/Meister	2	0	0	1	0	3	0	0	6
(Newfoundland and Labrador) Kearley/Kearley	0	1	2	0	1	0	3	1	8

=== Draw 8 ===
Thursday, March 29, 9:00 pm

Sheet A	1	2	3	4	5	6	7	8	9	Final
(Ontario) Tuck/Tuck	0	0	3	1	2	0	1	0	2	9
(Manitoba) Overton-Clapham/Dunstone	1	1	0	0	0	1	0	4	0	7

Sheet B	1	2	3	4	5	6	7	8	Final
(Ontario) Liscumb/Lisucmb	0	0	0	2	0	0	X	X	2
(Nova Scotia) Jones/Everist	1	3	4	0	1	1	X	X	10

Sheet C	1	2	3	4	5	6	7	8	Final
(Alberta) (Manitoba) Courtney/Carruthers	3	0	1	0	0	3	0	1	8
(Ontario) Murphy/Murphy	0	1	0	3	1	0	1	0	6

Sheet D	1	2	3	4	5	6	7	8	Final
(Manitoba) Hale-Menard/Baker	1	0	1	0	2	0	0	X	4
(New Brunswick) Hunter/Robichaud	0	3	0	1	0	1	2	X	7

Sheet E	1	2	3	4	5	6	7	8	9	Final
(Manitoba) (Alberta) Peterman/Samagalski	0	2	0	1	2	0	2	0	1	8
(Alberta) (Ontario) Sweeting/March	1	0	2	0	0	2	0	2	0	7

Sheet F	1	2	3	4	5	6	7	8	Final
(Saskatchewan) Kitz/Stewart	3	2	1	1	0	1	0	X	8
(Prince Edward Island) Ferguson/Smith	0	0	0	0	2	0	2	X	4

Sheet G	1	2	3	4	5	6	7	8	Final
(Ontario) Jones/Laing	1	0	1	0	3	1	0	X	6
(Alberta) (Ontario) Ferguson/Epping	0	1	0	1	0	0	1	X	3

Sheet H	1	2	3	4	5	6	7	8	Final
(Saskatchewan) Kasner/Kalthoff	0	0	0	1	0	1	0	X	2
(Alberta) Sturmay/Sturmay	1	1	1	0	1	0	1	X	5

=== Draw 9 ===
Friday, March 30, 8:30 am

Sheet A	1	2	3	4	5	6	7	8	Final
(Northwest Territories) McKay-Saturnino/Aho	0	0	1	0	0	0	X	X	1
(Alberta) (Saskatchewan) Crocker/Muyres	1	3	0	3	1	3	X	X	11

Sheet B	1	2	3	4	5	6	7	8	Final
(Saskatchewan) Just/Deis	2	0	2	1	0	0	1	X	6
(Newfoundland and Labrador) Kearley/Kearley	0	3	0	0	5	2	0	X	10

Sheet C	1	2	3	4	5	6	7	8	Final
(Quebec) Desjardins/Desjardins	0	3	0	1	1	0	0	0	5
(British Columbia) Daniels/Meister	1	0	3	0	0	1	1	1	7

Sheet D	1	2	3	4	5	6	7	8	Final
(Saskatchewan) Martin/Laycock	0	3	0	0	1	0	0	X	4
(Alberta) Park/Thomas	4	0	1	2	0	3	1	X	11

Sheet E	1	2	3	4	5	6	7	8	Final
(Manitoba) Cannon/Gunnlaugson	0	3	4	0	2	0	X	X	9
(Quebec) Perron/Mullen	1	0	0	0	0	1	X	X	2

Sheet F	1	2	3	4	5	6	7	8	Final
(Ontario) Cottrill/Cottrill	0	0	0	2	1	0	1	X	4
(Northern Ontario) Gates/Bonot	1	1	1	0	0	4	0	X	7

Sheet G	1	2	3	4	5	6	7	8	9	Final
(Yukon) Smallwood/Smallwood	1	1	1	0	1	0	3	0	0	7
(Manitoba) Groff/Doering	0	0	0	2	0	2	0	3	1	8

Sheet H	1	2	3	4	5	6	7	8	Final
(Alberta) (Manitoba) Carey/Hodgson	1	0	0	0	1	0	1	X	3
(Manitoba) Sahaidak/Lott	0	1	3	1	0	2	0	X	7

=== Draw 10 ===
Friday, March 30, 11:00 am

Sheet A	1	2	3	4	5	6	7	8	Final
(Prince Edward Island) Ferguson/Smith	0	3	0	1	0	0	X	X	4
(Alberta) (Ontario) Sweeting/March	3	0	3	0	5	1	X	X	12

Sheet B	1	2	3	4	5	6	7	8	Final
(Alberta) (Ontario) Ferguson/Epping	1	0	2	0	3	0	0	3	9
(Alberta) Sturmay/Sturmay	0	2	0	2	0	2	1	0	7

Sheet C	1	2	3	4	5	6	7	8	Final
(Ontario) Jones/Laing	2	0	2	0	1	1	0	X	6
(Saskatchewan) Kasner/Kalthoff	0	1	0	1	0	0	1	X	3

Sheet D	1	2	3	4	5	6	7	8	Final
(Saskatchewan) Kitz/Stewart	1	0	2	0	0	3	3	X	9
(Manitoba) (Alberta) Peterman/Samagalski	0	2	0	1	1	0	0	X	4

Sheet E	1	2	3	4	5	6	7	8	Final
(Ontario) Murphy/Murphy	1	0	3	0	1	1	2	X	8
(New Brunswick) Hunter/Robichaud	0	2	0	1	0	0	0	X	3

Sheet F	1	2	3	4	5	6	7	8	Final
(Ontario) Liscumb/Liscumb	0	3	0	1	0	2	0	0	6
(Ontario) Tuck/Tuck	1	0	3	0	2	0	3	1	10

Sheet G	1	2	3	4	5	6	7	8	Final
(Nova Scotia) Jones/Everist	0	1	1	0	0	1	1	0	4
(Manitoba) Overton-Clapham/Dunstone	2	0	0	1	1	0	0	2	6

Sheet H	1	2	3	4	5	6	7	8	Final
(Alberta) (Manitoba) Courtney/Carruthers	2	2	2	1	0	3	X	X	10
(Manitoba) Hale-Menard/Baker	0	0	0	0	2	0	X	X	2

=== Draw 11 ===
Friday, March 30, 1:30 pm

Sheet A	1	2	3	4	5	6	7	8	Final
(Manitoba) Sahaidak/Lott	1	1	1	0	2	0	3	X	8
(Yukon) Smallwood/Smallwood	0	0	0	1	0	1	0	X	2

Sheet B	1	2	3	4	5	6	7	8	Final
(Manitoba) Cannon/Gunnlaugson	1	0	0	0	2	1	1	2	7
(Ontario) Cottrill/Cottrill	0	2	1	1	0	0	0	0	4

Sheet C	1	2	3	4	5	6	7	8	Final
(Quebec) Perron/Mullen	0	2	0	0	3	0	0	X	5
(Northern Ontario) Gates/Bonot	2	0	2	1	0	3	1	X	9

Sheet D	1	2	3	4	5	6	7	8	Final
(Alberta) (Manitoba) Carey/Hodgson	1	1	2	3	0	1	X	X	8
(Manitoba) Groff/Doering	0	0	0	0	1	0	X	X	1

Sheet E	1	2	3	4	5	6	7	8	Final
(British Columbia) Daniels/Meister	2	2	0	3	3	0	X	X	10
(Northwest Territories) McKay-Saturnino/Aho	0	0	1	0	0	1	X	X	2

Sheet F	1	2	3	4	5	6	7	8	Final
(Saskatchewan) Just/Deis	0	0	0	3	0	0	1	X	4
(Alberta) Park/Thomas	1	1	2	0	3	1	0	X	8

Sheet G	1	2	3	4	5	6	7	8	Final
(Newfoundland and Labrador) Kearley/Kearley	0	2	0	1	0	0	0	X	3
(Saskatchewan) Martin/Laycock	1	0	1	0	2	2	3	X	9

Sheet H	1	2	3	4	5	6	7	8	Final
(Quebec) Desjardins/Desjardins	1	0	2	0	3	0	2	1	9
(Alberta) (Saskatchewan) Crocker/Muyres	0	3	0	1	0	3	0	0	7

=== Draw 12 ===
Friday, March 30, 4:00 pm

Sheet A	1	2	3	4	5	6	7	8	Final
(Manitoba) Hale-Menard/Baker	0	1	0	3	0	1	X	X	5
(Nova Scotia) Jones/Everist	1	0	4	0	4	0	X	X	9

Sheet B	1	2	3	4	5	6	7	8	Final
(Ontario) Murphy/Murphy	1	1	0	1	2	0	1	1	7
(Ontario) Tuck/Tuck	0	0	2	0	0	3	0	0	5

Sheet C	1	2	3	4	5	6	7	8	Final
(New Brunswick) Hunter/Robichaud	0	2	0	1	0	3	0	X	6
(Ontario) Liscumb/Liscumb	3	0	1	0	3	0	2	X	9

Sheet D	1	2	3	4	5	6	7	8	Final
(Alberta) (Manitoba) Courtney/Carruthers	0	0	4	0	0	0	2	0	6
(Manitoba) Overton-Clapham/Dunstone	2	1	0	1	1	1	0	2	8

Sheet E	1	2	3	4	5	6	7	8	Final
(Saskatchewan) Kasner/Kalthoff	1	3	2	2	2	1	X	X	11
(Prince Edward Island) Ferguson/Smith	0	0	0	0	0	0	X	X	0

Sheet F	1	2	3	4	5	6	7	8	Final
(Alberta) (Ontario) Ferguson/Epping	1	0	1	0	3	0	0	X	5
(Manitoba) (Alberta) Peterman/Samagalski	0	1	0	4	0	1	1	X	7

Sheet G	1	2	3	4	5	6	7	8	Final
(Alberta) Sturmay/Sturmay	0	0	4	0	0	1	0	2	7
(Saskatchewan) Kitz/Stewart	1	1	0	4	1	0	1	0	8

Sheet H	1	2	3	4	5	6	7	8	Final
(Ontario) Jones/Laing	1	0	3	1	0	0	0	3	8
(Alberta) (Ontario) Sweeting/March	0	1	0	0	1	2	3	0	7

=== Draw 13 ===
Friday, March 30, 6:30 pm

Sheet A	1	2	3	4	5	6	7	8	Final
(British Columbia) Daniels/Meister	0	1	0	0	0	3	0	1	5
(Saskatchewan) Martin/Laycock	1	0	1	2	1	0	3	0	8

Sheet B	1	2	3	4	5	6	7	8	Final
(Saskatchewan) Just/Deis	1	0	0	0	1	0	2	0	4
(Alberta) (Saskatchewan) Crocker/Muyres	0	1	2	1	0	1	0	2	7

Sheet C	1	2	3	4	5	6	7	8	Final
(Quebec) Desjardins/Desjardins	0	0	0	1	0	X	X	X	1
(Alberta) Park/Thomas	2	2	5	0	3	X	X	X	12

Sheet D	1	2	3	4	5	6	7	8	Final
(Newfoundland and Labrador) Kearley/Kearley	0	3	2	0	1	0	1	0	7
(Northwest Territories) McKay-Saturnino/Aho	2	0	0	2	0	4	0	3	11

Sheet E	1	2	3	4	5	6	7	8	Final
(Alberta) (Manitoba) Carey/Hodgson	0	2	2	2	0	0	2	X	8
(Ontario) Cottrill/Cottrill	1	0	0	0	2	1	0	X	4

Sheet F	1	2	3	4	5	6	7	8	Final
(Manitoba) Groff/Doering	0	0	0	1	0	1	X	X	2
(Manitoba) Cannon/Gunnlaugson	3	1	2	0	2	0	X	X	8

Sheet G	1	2	3	4	5	6	7	8	Final
(Manitoba) Sahaidak/Lott	1	0	0	1	1	0	2	0	5
(Northern Ontario) Gates/Bonot	0	1	1	0	0	1	0	1	4

Sheet H	1	2	3	4	5	6	7	8	Final
(Quebec) Perron/Mullen	2	0	2	0	1	0	1	0	6
(Yukon) Smallwood/Smallwood	0	1	0	1	0	3	0	2	7

=== Draw 14 ===
Friday, March 30, 9:00 pm

Sheet A	1	2	3	4	5	6	7	8	Final
(Saskatchewan) Kasner/Kalthoff	1	0	3	0	2	0	1	X	7
(Saskatchewan) Kitz/Stewart	0	1	0	1	0	3	0	X	5

Sheet B	1	2	3	4	5	6	7	8	Final
(Alberta) (Ontario) Ferguson/Epping	0	3	0	1	0	0	2	1	7
(Alberta) (Ontario) Sweeting/March	3	0	1	0	3	1	0	0	8

Sheet C	1	2	3	4	5	6	7	8	Final
(Ontario) Jones/Laing	0	2	0	1	3	0	3	X	9
(Manitoba) (Alberta) Peterman/Samagalski	1	0	1	0	0	1	0	X	3

Sheet D	1	2	3	4	5	6	7	8	Final
(Alberta) Sturmay/Sturmay	1	1	1	2	1	1	1	0	8
(Prince Edward Island) Ferguson/Smith	0	0	0	0	0	0	0	1	1

Sheet E	1	2	3	4	5	6	7	8	Final
(Alberta) (Manitoba) Courtney/Carruthers	0	2	2	1	1	1	X	X	7
(Ontario) Tuck/Tuck	3	0	0	0	0	0	X	X	3

Sheet F	1	2	3	4	5	6	7	8	Final
(Ontario) Murphy/Murphy	2	0	1	0	1	0	0	0	4
(Manitoba) Overton-Clapham/Dunstone	0	1	0	1	0	1	1	2	6

Sheet G	1	2	3	4	5	6	7	8	Final
(Manitoba) Hale-Menard/Baker	0	0	0	1	0	1	X	X	2
(Ontario) Liscumb/Liscumb	3	2	1	0	2	0	X	X	8

Sheet H	1	2	3	4	5	6	7	8	Final
(New Brunswick) Hunter/Robichaud	0	4	0	0	1	0	0	X	5
(Nova Scotia) Jones/Everist	1	0	3	4	0	2	2	X	12

== Playoffs ==
Round of 12
(Alberta) Park/Thomas	8
(Ontario) Murphy/Murphy	2
(Manitoba) (Alberta) Carey/Hodgson	7
(Ontario) (Alberta) Sweeting/March	6
(Quebec) Desjardins/Desjardins	5
(Ontario) Jones/Laing	6
(Manitoba) (Alberta) Peterman/Samagalski	5
(Manitoba) Overton-Clapham/Dunstone	3

Quarterfinals
(Alberta) Park/Thomas	6
(Manitoba) Sahaidak/Lott	9
(Manitoba) (Alberta) Carey/Hodgson	8
(Saskatchewan) Kitz/Stewart	5
(Ontario) Jones/Laing	3
(Saskatchewan) (Alberta) Crocker/Muyres	7
(Manitoba) (Alberta) Peterman/Samagalski	5
(Manitoba) (Alberta) Courtney/Carruthers	8

Semifinals
(Manitoba) Sahaidak/Lott	7
(Manitoba) (Alberta) Carey/Hodgson	4
(Saskatchewan) (Alberta) Crocker/Muyres	9
(Manitoba) (Alberta) Courtney/Carruthers	4

Final
(Manitoba) Sahaidak/Lott	7
(Saskatchewan) (Alberta) Crocker/Muyres	8

=== Round of 12 ===
Saturday, March 31, 14:00

Team	1	2	3	4	5	6	7	8	Final
(Alberta) Park/Thomas	2	1	3	2	0	0	X	X	8
(Ontario) Murphy/Murphy	0	0	0	0	1	1	X	X	2

Player percentages
Alberta		Ontario	
Kalynn Park	71%	Janet Murphy	60%
Charley Thomas	88%	Hugh Murphy	54%
Total	81%	Total	58%

Team	1	2	3	4	5	6	7	8	9	Final
(Manitoba) (Alberta) Carey/Hodgson	2	0	1	1	0	0	2	0	1	7
(Ontario) (Alberta) Sweeting/March	0	2	0	0	1	1	0	2	0	6

Player percentages
Manitoba Alberta		Ontario Alberta	
Chelsea Carey	69%	Valerie Sweeting	70%
Colin Hodgson	74%	Tim March	79%
Total	72%	Total	74%

Team	1	2	3	4	5	6	7	8	Final
(Quebec) Desjardins/Desjardins	1	0	1	0	2	0	1	0	5
(Ontario) Jones/Laing	0	3	0	1	0	1	0	1	6

Player percentages
Quebec		Ontario	
Émilie Desjardins	66%	Jennifer Jones	67%
Robert Desjardins	58%	Brent Laing	71%
Total	61%	Total	69%

Team	1	2	3	4	5	6	7	8	Final
(Manitoba) (Alberta) Peterman/Samagalski	1	1	1	1	0	0	1	0	5
(Manitoba) Overton-Clapham/Dunstone	0	0	0	0	1	1	0	2	4

Player percentages
Manitoba Alberta		Manitoba	
Jocelyn Peterman	84%	Cathy Overton-Clapham	52%
Derek Samagalski	76%	Matthew Dunstone	73%
Total	79%	Total	64%

=== Quarterfinals ===
Saturday, March 31, 20:00

Team	1	2	3	4	5	6	7	8	Final
(Alberta) Park/Thomas	0	1	0	1	0	0	4	0	6
(Manitoba) Sahaidak/Lott	2	0	1	0	1	3	0	2	9

Player percentages
Alberta		Manitoba	
Kalynn Park	80%	Kadriana Sahaidak	70%
Charley Thomas	69%	Colton Lott	81%
Total	73%	Total	77%

Team	1	2	3	4	5	6	7	8	Final
(Manitoba) (Alberta) Carey/Hodgson	0	1	1	2	1	0	2	1	8
(Saskatchewan) Kitz/Stewart	1	0	0	0	0	4	0	0	5

Player percentages
Manitoba Alberta		Saskatchewan	
Chelsea Carey	78%	Chaelynn Kitz	55%
Colin Hodgson	74%	Brayden Stewart	69%
Total	76%	Total	63%

Team	1	2	3	4	5	6	7	8	Final
(Ontario) Jones/Laing	0	2	0	0	0	0	1	X	3
(Saskatchewan) (Alberta) Crocker/Muyres	2	0	1	1	2	1	0	X	7

Player percentages
Ontario		Saskatchewan Alberta	
Jennifer Jones	66%	Laura Crocker	93%
Brent Laing	64%	Kirk Muyres	75%
Total	65%	Total	82%

Team	1	2	3	4	5	6	7	8	Final
(Manitoba) (Alberta) Peterman/Samagalski	0	1	0	2	0	1	0	1	5
(Manitoba) (Alberta) Courtney/Carruthers	1	0	2	0	2	0	3	0	8

Player percentages
Manitoba Alberta		Manitoba	
Jocelyn Peterman	90%	Joanne Courtney	81%
Derek Samagalski	73%	Reid Carruthers	88%
Total	79%	Total	85%

=== Semifinals ===
Sunday, April 1, 09:00

Team	1	2	3	4	5	6	7	8	Final
(Manitoba) Sahaidak/Lott	0	2	0	0	2	0	3	X	7
(Manitoba) (Alberta) Carey/Hodgson	1	0	1	1	0	1	0	X	4

Player percentages
Manitoba		Manitoba Alberta	
Kadriana Sahaidak	53%	Chelsea Carey	75%
Colton Lott	75%	Colin Hodgson	58%
Total	66%	Total	65%

Team	1	2	3	4	5	6	7	8	Final
(Saskatchewan) (Alberta) Crocker/Muyres	2	0	0	2	1	0	4	X	9
(Manitoba) (Alberta) Courtney/Carruthers	0	2	1	0	0	1	0	X	4

Player percentages
Saskatchewan Alberta		Manitoba Alberta	
Laura Crocker	80%	Joanne Courtney	68%
Kirk Muyres	90%	Reid Carruthers	69%
Total	86%	Total	69%

=== Final ===
Sunday, April 1, 12:00

Team	1	2	3	4	5	6	7	8	Final
(Manitoba) Sahaidak/Lott	0	2	0	0	2	0	3	0	7
(Saskatchewan) (Alberta) Crocker/Muyres	2	0	2	1	0	1	0	2	8

Player percentages
Manitoba		Saskatchewan Alberta	
Kadriana Sahaidak	66%	Laura Crocker	89%
Colton Lott	88%	Kirk Muyres	85%
Total	79%	Total	87%
