= Chaelynn Stewart =

Canadian curler

- Curler
- Born: Chaelynn Kitz; March 10, 1997 (age 29); Yorkton, Saskatchewan

Team
- Curling club: Oxbow CC, Oxbow, SK; Nutana CC, Saskatoon, SK
- Skip: Nancy Martin
- Third: Chaelynn Stewart
- Second: Kadriana Lott
- Lead: Makenna Hadway
- Mixed doubles partner: Brayden Stewart

Curling career
- Member Association: Saskatchewan
- Hearts: 2 (2021, 2025)
- Top CTRS ranking: 14th (2019–20)

Chaelynn Stewart (born March 10, 1997 as Chaelynn Kitz) is a Canadian curler from Minnedosa, Manitoba. She currently plays third on Team Nancy Martin.

== Career ==
Stewart represented Saskatchewan at back-to-back Canadian Mixed Doubles Curling Championships with her boyfriend Brayden Stewart in 2018 and 2019. In 2018, the pair finished first place in their pool with a 5–2 record before losing in the quarterfinals to Chelsea Carey and Colin Hodgson. At their second appearance in 2019, they just missed the playoffs with a 4–3 record.

Stewart joined the Sherry Anderson rink for the 2019–20 season. The team had three semifinal finishes and two quarterfinal finishes on the World Curling Tour. At the 2020 Saskatchewan Scotties Tournament of Hearts, they lost in the final to Robyn Silvernagle 8–5. Due to the COVID-19 pandemic in Saskatchewan, the 2021 Saskatchewan Scotties Tournament of Hearts was cancelled. Since the reigning champions, Team Silvernagle, did not retain three out of four team members still playing together, Team Anderson was invited to represent Saskatchewan at the 2021 Scotties Tournament of Hearts, as they had the most points from the 2019–20 and 2020–21 seasons combined, which they accepted. At the Hearts, they finished with a 6–6 sixth place finish.

== Personal life ==
Stewart is a kinesiology graduate from the University of Saskatchewan. She is married to fellow curler Brayden Stewart. She currently works as a firefighter paramedic for Brandon Fire and Emergency Services. Her father, Shane Kitz, coaches her team.

== Teams ==
Season	Skip	Third	Second	Lead
2014–15	Chaelynn Kitz	Rikki Schick	Taylor Marcotte	Rachel Erickson
2015–16	Chaelynn Kitz	Rikki Schick	Taylor Marcotte	Rachel Erickson
2016–17	Chaelynn Kitz	Rikki Schick	Rachel Erickson	Sarah Hoag
2017–18	Chaelynn Kitz	Rikki Schick	Alexa Dixon	Kelsey Dixon
2018–19	Chantelle Eberle	Chaelynn Kitz	Jana Tisdale	Haylee Jameson
2019–20	Sherry Anderson	Nancy Martin	Meaghan Frerichs	Chaelynn Kitz
2020–21	Sherry Anderson	Nancy Martin	Chaelynn Kitz	Breanne Knapp
2021–22	Sherry Anderson	Nancy Martin	Chaelynn Kitz	Breanne Knapp
2023–24	Robyn Silvernagle	Kelly Schafer	Chaelynn Kitz	Kara Thevenot
2024–25	Nancy Martin	Chaelynn Stewart	Kadriana Lott	Deanna Doig
2025–26	Nancy Martin	Chaelynn Stewart	Kadriana Lott	Christie Gamble
