= Nancy Martin =

Canadian curler (born 1973)

- Curler
- Born: February 17, 1973 (age 53); Rosetown, Saskatchewan, Canada

Team
- Curling club: Nutana CC, Saskatoon, SK
- Skip: Nancy Martin
- Third: Chaelynn Stewart
- Second: Kadriana Lott
- Lead: Makenna Hadway
- Mixed doubles partner: Steve Laycock

Curling career
- Member Association: Saskatchewan
- Hearts: 2 (2021, 2025)
- Top CTRS ranking: 14th (2019–20, 2022–23)
Medal record
Curling
Representing Saskatchewan
Canadian Mixed Doubles Championship
| Silver medal – second place | 2013 Leduc |
| Silver medal – second place | 2019 Fredericton |

Nancy Faye Martin (born February 17, 1973, in Rosetown, Saskatchewan) is a Canadian curler from Wakaw, Saskatchewan. She currently skips her own team out of Martensville.

== Career ==
=== Women's career ===
Martin has been curling competitively since the 2004–05 season. In the 2014–15 season, she joined the Jill Shumay rink at third, playing one season for the team. She skipped her own team from 2015 to 2018.

Martin joined the Sherry Anderson rink for the 2018–19 season. At the 2019 Saskatchewan Scotties Tournament of Hearts, Team Anderson made it all the way to the final where they lost to Robyn Silvernagle 6–5, after giving up a steal in the tenth end. The next season, The team had three semifinal finishes and two quarterfinal finishes on the World Curling Tour. At the 2020 Saskatchewan Scotties Tournament of Hearts, they once again lost in the final to the Robyn Silvernagle rink, this time 8–5. Due to the COVID-19 pandemic in Saskatchewan, the 2021 Saskatchewan Scotties Tournament of Hearts was cancelled. Since the reigning champions, Team Silvernagle, did not retain three out of four team members still playing together, Team Anderson was invited to represent Saskatchewan at the 2021 Scotties Tournament of Hearts, as they had the most points from the 2019–20 and 2020–21 seasons combined, which they accepted. At the Hearts, they finished with a 6–6 sixth-place finish. At the 2022 Saskatchewan Scotties Tournament of Hearts, Team Anderson did not make it to the playoffs.

Martin began skipping her own team again in 2023 with teammates Lindsay Bertsch, Jennifer Armstrong and Krysten Karwacki. The team made it to the finals of the 2023 Saskatchewan Scotties Tournament of Hearts, where they lost in the final to Robyn Silvernagle. The following season, Armstrong was replaced by Madison Kleiter. The team made it to the finals of the 2024 Saskatchewan Scotties Tournament of Hearts, but lost in the final again, this time to Skylar Ackerman.

=== Seniors ===
Martin won the 2023 Saskatchewan senior curling championships with teammates Deanna Doig, Nancy Inglis and Cathy Inglis. The team represented Saskatchewan at the 2023 Canadian Senior Curling Championships, where Martin led the team to the final, where they lost to Ontario, skipped by Susan Froud.

=== Mixed doubles ===
Martin has seen success playing mixed doubles curling. She played in her first Canadian Mixed Doubles Curling Championship in 2013 with partner Dustin Kalthoff. The pair made it all the way to the final where they lost to the Quebec pair of Robert Desjardins and Isabelle Néron. The pair were back again in 2014, but lost in the quarterfinals to Charley Thomas and Kalynn Park. At the 2015 Canadian Mixed Doubles Curling Trials, the pair did not even make it to the playoffs, posting a 3–4 recording in their pool.

Martin paired up with Catlin Schneider beginning with the 2015–16 season. At the 2016 Canadian Mixed Doubles Curling Trials, the pair made it to the round of 12, where they were eliminated by Emma Miskew and Ryan Fry. The pair were less successful at the 2017 Canadian Mixed Doubles Curling Championship, missing the playoffs after finishing with a 3–4 record. They played in the 2018 Canadian Mixed Doubles Curling Olympic Trials, finishing with 5–3 pool record and lost in a tiebreaker to the pairing of Chelsea Carey and Colin Hodgson.

Martin paired up with Steve Laycock for the 2018 Canadian Mixed Doubles Curling Championship. There, they just missed the playoffs after recording a 4–3 record in pool play.

Martin competed in the 2019 Canadian Mixed Doubles Curling Championship with Tyrel Griffith, losing to Jocelyn Peterman and Brett Gallant in the final. Martin and Griffith returned to play at the 2021 Canadian Mixed Doubles Curling Championship, where they just missed the playoffs, finishing pool play with a 4–2 record. They were just as unlucky at the 2023 Canadian Mixed Doubles Curling Championship, missing the playoffs after going 5–2.

Martin partnered back up with Laycock for the 2024 Canadian Mixed Doubles Curling Championship. They found some success, making it to the quarterfinals before losing to the Manitoba champions Kadriana Lott and Colton Lott.

== Personal life ==
Martin is employed as a civil servant. She is married and has three children.
