= 2016 Canadian Mixed Doubles Curling Trials =

- Host city: Saskatoon, Saskatchewan
- Arena: Nutana Curling Club
- Dates: March 31 – April 3
- Winner: (Alberta) (Newfoundland and Labrador) Peterman/Gallant
- Curling club: The Glencoe Club; Bally Haly Golf & Curling Club
- Female: Jocelyn Peterman
- Male: Brett Gallant
- Finalist: (Alberta) (Newfoundland and Labrador) Crocker/Walker

The 2016 Canadian Mixed Doubles Curling Trials were held from March 31 to April 3 at the Nutana Curling Club in Saskatoon, Saskatchewan.

== Teams ==
The teams are listed as follows:

=== Provincial and Territorial champions ===
Province / Territory	Male	Female	Clubs(s)
Alberta	Brock Virtue	Jessie Kaufman	Avonair Curling Club / Lethbridge Curling Club
British Columbia	Jim Cotter	Jaelyn Cotter	Vernon Curling Club
Manitoba	Mark Anderson	Ashley Ewasiuk	Riverview Curling Club
New Brunswick	Alex Robichaud	Julia Hunter	Capital Winter Club
Newfoundland and Labrador	Cory Schuh	Erin Porter	St. John's Curling Club
Northern Ontario	Chris Glibota	Megan St. Amand	Community First Curling Centre
Northwest Territories	Nick Kaeser	Lora Browne	Fort Smith Curling Club
Nova Scotia	Mark Dacey	Jennifer Baxter	Mayflower Curling Club
Ontario	Mike Anderson	Danielle Inglis	Donalda Curling Club
Prince Edward Island	Kyle Holland	Sabrina Smith	Cornwall Curling Club/Charlottetown Curling Club
Quebec	Robert Desjardins	Émilie Desjardins	Club de curling Chicoutimi
Saskatchewan	Dustin Kalthoff	Marliese Kasner	Nutana Curling Club
Yukon	Bob Smallwood	Jody Smallwood	Whitehorse Curling Club

=== Open entries ===
Province / Territory	Male	Female
Newfoundland and Labrador; Ontario	Mark Nichols	Rachel Homan
Newfoundland and Labrador; Alberta	Geoff Walker	Laura Crocker
Manitoba; Alberta	Colin Hodgson	Chelsea Carey
Saskatchewan	Mike Armstrong	Ashley Quick
Ontario	Hugh Murphy	Janet Murphy
Ontario	Shawn Cottrill	Katie Cottrill
Ontario	John Epping	Lisa Weagle
Newfoundland and Labrador; Alberta	Brett Gallant	Jocelyn Peterman
Saskatchewan	Steve Laycock	Stefanie Lawton
British Columbia	Jim Cotter	Jaelyn Cotter
Manitoba	Mike McEwen	Dawn McEwen
Alberta	Charley Thomas	Kalynn Park
Manitoba; Saskatchewan	Derek Samagalski	Sherry Just
Saskatchewan	Catlin Schneider	Nancy Martin
Manitoba	Jason Gunnlaugson	Michelle Kruk
Manitoba; Alberta	Reid Carruthers	Joanne Courtney
Ontario	Ryan Fry	Emma Miskew
Ontario	Wayne Tuck, Jr.	Kim Tuck
Saskatchewan	Ryan Deis	DondaLee Deis
Manitoba	Ray Baker	Lisa Menard

== Round robin standings ==
Pool A	W	L
(Newfoundland and Labrador) (Alberta) Walker/Crocker	7	0
(Newfoundland and Labrador) (Ontario) Nichols/Homan	6	1
(Ontario) Murphy/Murphy	5	2
(Manitoba) (Alberta) Hodgson/Carey	3	4
(Saskatchewan) Armstrong/Quick	3	4
(Yukon) Smallwood/Smallwood	2	5
(Ontario) Cottrill/Cottrill	1	6
(Northern Ontario) Glibota/St. Amand	1	6

Pool B	W	L
(Newfoundland and Labrador) (Alberta) Gallant/Peterman	6	1
(Ontario) Epping/Weagle	5	2
(Nova Scotia) Dacey/Baxter	5	2
(British Columbia) Cotter/Cotter	4	3
(Prince Edward Island) Holland/Smith	3	4
(Alberta) Virtue/Kaufman	3	4
(Saskatchewan) Laycock/Lawton	2	5
(Northwest Territories) Kaeser/Brown	0	7

Pool C	W	L
(Manitoba) McEwen/McEwen	7	0
(Saskatchewan) Schneider/Martin	5	2
(Alberta) Thomas/Park	5	2
(Quebec) Desjardins/Desjardins	4	3
(Manitoba) (Saskatchewan) Samagalski/Just	3	4
(Manitoba) Gunnlaugson/Kruk	3	4
(New Brunswick) Robichaud/Hunter	1	6
(Manitoba) Anderson/Ewasiuk	0	7

Pool D	W	L
(Saskatchewan) Kalthoff/Kasner	6	1
(Ontario) Fry/Miskew	5	2
(Manitoba) (Alberta) Carruthers/Courtney	5	2
(Ontario) Anderson/Inglis	4	3
(Ontario) Tuck/Tuck	4	3
(Newfoundland and Labrador) Schuh/Porter	2	5
(Saskatchewan) Deis/Deis	1	6
(Manitoba) Baker/Menard	1	6

== Playoffs ==
Round of 12
(Saskatchewan) Martin/Schneider	5
(Ontario) Miskew/Fry	7
(Ontario) (Newfoundland and Labrador) Homan/Nichols	8
(Nova Scotia) Baxter/Dacey	3
(Ontario) Weagle/Epping	8
(Ontario) Murphy/Murphy	4
(Alberta) Park/Thomas	8
(Alberta) (Manitoba) Courtney/Carruthers	4

Quarterfinals
(Ontario) Miskew/Fry	7
(Manitoba) McEwen/McEwen	6
(Ontario) (Newfoundland and Labrador) Homan/Nichols	5
(Alberta) (Newfoundland and Labrador) Peterman/Gallant	9
(Ontario) Weagle/Epping	6
(Saskatchewan) Kasner/Kalthoff	8
(Alberta) Park/Thomas	4
(Alberta) (Newfoundland and Labrador) Crocker/Walker	9

Semifinals
(Ontario) Miskew/Fry	7
(Alberta) (Newfoundland and Labrador) Peterman/Gallant	10
(Saskatchewan) Kasner/Kalthoff	6
(Alberta) (Newfoundland and Labrador) Crocker/Walker	10

Final
(Alberta) (Newfoundland and Labrador) Peterman/Gallant	12
(Alberta) (Newfoundland and Labrador) Crocker/Walker	8

=== Round of 12 ===
Saturday, April 2, 8:30 pm

Team	1	2	3	4	5	6	7	8	Final
(Saskatchewan) Martin/Schneider	0	0	2	2	0	0	1	0	5
(Ontario) Miskew/Fry 🔨	1	1	0	0	1	1	0	3	7

Team	1	2	3	4	5	6	7	8	Final
(Ontario) (Newfoundland and Labrador) Homan/Nichols 🔨	2	1	1	0	2	0	1	X	7
(Nova Scotia) Baxter/Dacey	0	0	0	2	0	1	0	X	3

Team	1	2	3	4	5	6	7	8	Final
(Ontario) Weagle/Epping 🔨	0	2	2	1	0	2	1	X	8
(Ontario) Murphy/Murphy	2	0	0	0	2	0	0	X	4

Team	1	2	3	4	5	6	7	8	Final
(Alberta) Park/Thomas 🔨	1	0	4	0	3	0	X	X	8
(Manitoba) Courtney/Carruthers	0	2	0	1	0	1	X	X	4

=== Quarterfinals ===
Sunday, April 3, 10:00 am

Team	1	2	3	4	5	6	7	8	Final
(Ontario) Miskew/Fry	0	3	1	1	0	1	0	1	7
(Manitoba) McEwen/McEwen 🔨	3	0	0	0	2	0	1	0	6

Team	1	2	3	4	5	6	7	8	Final
(Ontario) (Newfoundland and Labrador) Homan/Nichols	0	0	0	3	1	0	1	X	5
(Alberta) (Newfoundland and Labrador) Peterman/Gallant 🔨	1	1	2	0	0	5	0	X	9

Team	1	2	3	4	5	6	7	8	9	Final
(Ontario) Weagle/Epping	0	1	2	0	0	1	1	1	0	6
(Saskatchewan) Kasner/Kalthoff 🔨	1	0	0	3	2	0	0	0	2	8

Team	1	2	3	4	5	6	7	8	Final
(Alberta) Thomas/Park	0	0	2	0	2	0	0	X	4
(Alberta) (Newfoundland and Labrador) Crocker/Walker 🔨	3	1	0	2	0	2	1	X	9

=== Semifinals ===
Sunday, April 3, 1:00 pm

Team	1	2	3	4	5	6	7	8	Final
(Ontario) Miskew/Fry	0	1	0	3	1	1	1	0	7
(Alberta) (Newfoundland and Labrador) Peterman/Gallant 🔨	2	0	6	0	0	0	0	2	10

Team	1	2	3	4	5	6	7	8	Final
(Saskatchewan) Kasner/Kalthoff	0	2	0	2	0	1	1	0	6
(Alberta) (Newfoundland and Labrador) Crocker/Walker 🔨	1	0	2	0	4	0	0	3	10

=== Final ===
Sunday, April 3, 4:00 pm

Sheet C	1	2	3	4	5	6	7	8	Final
(Alberta) (Newfoundland and Labrador) Peterman/Gallant	0	2	2	0	2	0	4	2	12
(Alberta) (Newfoundland and Labrador) Crocker/Walker 🔨	3	0	0	4	0	1	0	0	8
