= Émilie Desjardins =

Canadian curler (born 1999)

- Curler
- Born: May 20, 1999 (age 27); Chicoutimi, Quebec

Team
- Curling club: CC Chicoutimi, Chicoutimi, QC
- Mixed doubles partner: Robert Desjardins

Curling career
- Member Association: Quebec
- Hearts: 1 (2023)

Émilie Desjardins (born May 20, 1999) is a Canadian curler from Chicoutimi, Quebec. She currently competes in the mixed doubles discipline on the World Curling Tour with her father, Robert as Team "Hôtel Le Montagnais".

== Career ==
Desjardins has found most of her curling success in mixed doubles. Having only begun curling at around 2014, she and her father Robert, 2013 Canadian Mixed Doubles Curling Trials champion, won the Quebec Mixed Doubles Championship in 2016. This qualified the pair to represent Quebec at the 2016 Canadian Mixed Doubles Curling Trials. There, they just missed the playoffs, posting a 4–3 record. The pair qualified as an open entry at the 2017 Canadian Mixed Doubles Curling Championship, but had less success, finishing with a 2–5 record. The pair qualified for the 2018 Canadian Mixed Doubles Curling Olympic Trials, the first year mixed doubles was added to the Olympic programme. At the Trials, the pair finished with a 4–4 record. Desjardins was the youngest competitor at the tournament. The pair had more success at the 2018 Canadian Mixed Doubles Curling Championship, finishing the round robin with a 5–2 record, and qualifying for the playoffs. However, they would lose in the round of 12 to Jennifer Jones and Brent Laing. They again qualified as an open entry for the 2019 Canadian Mixed Doubles Curling Championship, but missed the playoffs with a 3–4 record.

The pair have had success more on the tour. In 2018, they received funding and sponsors to compete in international tournaments. They won their first event at the 2018 WCT Austrian Mixed Doubles Cup. They have also won the 2019 Saguenay Mixed Doubles Challenger, the 2020 Goldline Chicoutimi Mixed Doubles and the 2020 Goldline Tour Final.

Desjardins also plays in women's team curling. She has played in four Quebec Scotties Tournament of Hearts, Quebec's provincial women's championship. She played second for the Sophie Morissette rink at the 2017 Quebec Scotties Tournament of Hearts (2–4 record), lead for Isabelle Néron at the 2018 Quebec Scotties Tournament of Hearts (2–5 record) and was the alternate for Noémie Verreault at the 2019 Quebec Scotties Tournament of Hearts (4–5 record) and alternate for Gabrielle Lavoie at the 2020 Quebec Scotties Tournament of Hearts (4–4 record).

== Personal life ==
As of 2021, she was a student at Club de Tennis Arvida and is a student in a remedial teaching program. She also works in a pharmacy.
