= Canadian Mixed Doubles Curling Championship =

National curling championships in Canada

- Established: 2013
- 2026 host city: Surrey, British Columbia
- 2026 arena: Cloverdale Curling Club
- 2026 champion: (Alberta) (Ontario) Gray-Withers / Pietrangelo

Current edition
- 2026 Canadian Mixed Doubles Curling Championship

The Canadian Mixed Doubles Curling Championship (formerly Canadian Mixed Doubles Curling Trials) are the national curling championships for mixed doubles curling in Canada. The trials decide the team that represents Canada at the same year's World Mixed Doubles Curling Championship. The team representing Canada had been previously decided through a playoff between two teams formed from the winners of the Canadian Mixed Curling Championship earlier in the season.

== Format and qualification ==
Starting in 2017, the event consisted of thirty-two teams participating in a preliminary round robin and a single-knockout playoff. Each of the provincial and territorial curling associations are allotted one entry into the championship, the final four teams from the previous championship, as well as with the remaining teams qualifying based on their ranking on the Canadian Mixed Doubles Ranking (CMDR).

In 2026, while the qualification methods for the championship stayed the same, the total number of teams decreased to twenty-eight. These teams were then split into four pools, each playing a six-game round-robin with 12 teams advancing to the single knockout playoffs. The four pool winners earn byes directly into the quarterfinals, while the teams with the following eight best records, regardless of the pool, compete in the qualification playoff games.

== Past champions ==
Year	Winning team	Runner-up team	Host
2013	(Quebec) Isabelle Néron / Robert Desjardins	(Saskatchewan) Nancy Martin / Dustin Kalthoff	Leduc, Alberta
2014	(Ontario) Kim Tuck / Wayne Tuck, Jr.	(Alberta) Kalynn Park / Charley Thomas	Ottawa, Ontario
2015	(Alberta) Kalynn Park / Charley Thomas	(Ontario) Tess Bobbie / Bowie Abbis-Mills	Ottawa, Ontario
2016	(Alberta) Jocelyn Peterman / (Newfoundland and Labrador) Brett Gallant	(Alberta) Laura Crocker / (Newfoundland and Labrador) Geoff Walker	Saskatoon, Saskatchewan
2017	(Alberta) Joanne Courtney / (Manitoba) Reid Carruthers	(Ontario) Rachel Homan / (Alberta) John Morris	Saskatoon, Saskatchewan
2018	(Alberta) Laura Crocker / (Saskatchewan) Kirk Muyres	(Manitoba) Kadriana Sahaidak / Colton Lott	Leduc, Alberta
2019	(Manitoba) Jocelyn Peterman / (Newfoundland and Labrador) Brett Gallant	(Saskatchewan) Nancy Martin / (British Columbia) Tyrel Griffith	Fredericton, New Brunswick
2020	Cancelled due to the COVID-19 pandemic in Canada		
2021	(Manitoba) Kerri Einarson / (Newfoundland and Labrador) Brad Gushue	(Manitoba) Kadriana Sahaidak / Colton Lott	Calgary, Alberta
2022	Cancelled due to the COVID-19 pandemic in Canada		
2023	(Ontario) Jennifer Jones / Brent Laing	(Alberta) Jocelyn Peterman / Brett Gallant	Sudbury, Ontario
2024	(Manitoba) Kadriana Lott / Colton Lott	(Alberta) Laura Walker / (Saskatchewan) Kirk Muyres	Fredericton, New Brunswick
2025	(Manitoba) Kadriana Lott / Colton Lott	(Nova Scotia) Marlee Powers / Luke Saunders	Summerside, Prince Edward Island
2026	(Alberta) Serena Gray-Withers / (Ontario) Victor Pietrangelo	(Alberta) Zoe Cinnamon / Johnson Tao	Surrey, British Columbia
