= Curling at the 2007 Canada Games =

Curling events at the 2007 Canada Games were held on eight sheets of ice at the Mount McIntyre Recreation Centre in Whitehorse.

== Women's ==
Pool A
| Team | W | L |
|---|---|---|
| British Columbia | 5 | 1 |
| Saskatchewan | 4 | 2 |
| Nova Scotia | 4 | 2 |
| Quebec | 4 | 2 |
| Alberta | 3 | 3 |
| Yukon | 1 | 5 |
| Nunavut | 0 | 6 |

Pool B
| Team | W | L |
|---|---|---|
| Ontario | 5 | 0 |
| Manitoba | 4 | 1 |
| New Brunswick | 3 | 2 |
| Newfoundland and Labrador | 2 | 3 |
| Prince Edward Island | 1 | 4 |
| Northwest Territories | 0 | 5 |

Tie breakers

- Nova Scotia 9–3 Quebec
- Saskatchewan 12–3 Nova Scotia

Semi-finals
British Columbia | 6
Manitoba | 9
Ontario | 4
Saskatchewan | 2

Final
Manitoba | 5
Ontario | 7
Third place
British Columbia | 9
Saskatchewan | 8

| Medal | Team |
|---|---|
| Gold | (Ontario) Rachel Catherine Homan, Lynn Elizabeth Kreviazuk, Emma Kathryn Miskew, Jamie Ann Sinclair |
| Silver | (Manitoba) April Jorgensen, Katie Kruk, Roslynn Ripley, Lorelle Weiss |
| Bronze | (British Columbia) Simone Brosseau, Caitlin Davidson, Melissa Moen, Samantha Van Iperen |

== Men's ==
Pool A
| Team | W | L |
|---|---|---|
| Prince Edward Island | 6 | 0 |
| Ontario | 5 | 1 |
| Saskatchewan | 4 | 2 |
| Manitoba | 2 | 4 |
| Northwest Territories | 2 | 4 |
| Yukon | 2 | 4 |
| Nunavut | 0 | 6 |

Pool B
| Team | W | L |
|---|---|---|
| Quebec | 4 | 1 |
| Alberta | 3 | 2 |
| Nova Scotia | 3 | 2 |
| New Brunswick | 2 | 3 |
| Newfoundland and Labrador | 2 | 3 |
| British Columbia | 1 | 4 |

Tie breaker

- Alberta 6–4 Nova Scotia

Semi-finals
Alberta | 7
Prince Edward Island | 4
Ontario | 7
Quebec | 6

Final
Alberta | 8
Ontario | 6
Third place
Prince Edward Island | 6
Quebec | 3

| Medal | Team |
|---|---|
| Gold | (Alberta) Tyler Edward Bennett, Travis Andrew Guynup, Colin Sterling-Wyatt Hodgson, Joel William Otto Peterman |
| Silver | (Ontario) Mathew Robert Camm, Andrew Gordon Hamilton, Graham Alan Rathwell, Neil Patrick Sinclair |
| Bronze | (Prince Edward Island) Anson James Carmody, Adam Adrian Casey, Brett Philip Gallant, Alex Gordon MacFadyen |
