= 2023 Canadian Mixed Doubles Curling Championship =

Curling tournament

- Host city: Sudbury, Ontario
- Arena: Gerry McCrory Countryside Sports Complex
- Dates: March 21–26
- Winner: (Ontario) Jones / Laing
- Curling club: Barrie CC, Barrie
- Female: Jennifer Jones
- Male: Brent Laing
- Finalist: (Alberta) Peterman / Gallant

The 2023 Canadian Mixed Doubles Curling Championship was held from March 21 to 26 at the Gerry McCrory Countryside Sports Complex in Sudbury, Ontario. The winning pair represented Canada at the 2023 World Mixed Doubles Curling Championship in Gangneung, South Korea. This was the first time the event was held since 2021 when it was hosted in the "bubble" and the first time since 2019 it was held with fans.

== Teams ==
The teams are listed as follows:

=== Provincial and territorial champions ===
Province / Territory	Female	Male	Club(s)
Alberta	Ashley Kalk	Craig MacAlpine	Sherwood Park Curling Club
British Columbia	Sarah Loken	Cody Tanaka	Richmond Curling Centre
Manitoba	Kadriana Lott	Colton Lott	Winnipeg Beach Curling Club
New Brunswick	Leah Thompson	Charlie Sullivan	Thistle-St. Andrews Curling Club
Newfoundland and Labrador	Jessica Wiseman	Trent Skanes	RE/MAX Centre
Northern Ontario	Tracy Fleury	Jake Horgan	Northern Credit Union Community Centre
Northwest Territories	Margot Flemming	Jamie Koe	Yellowknife Curling Club
Nova Scotia	Karlee Everist	Bryce Everist	Halifax Curling Club
Ontario	Lynn Kreviazuk	David Mathers	Ottawa Curling Club
Prince Edward Island	Jenny White	Edward White	Summerside Curling Club
Quebec	Emily Riley	Jesse Mullen	Glenmore/Chicoutimi/Kénogami
Saskatchewan	Stephanie Bukurak	Adam Bukurak	Callie / Highland
Yukon	Patty Wallingham	Ben Robinson	Whitehorse Curling Club

=== Canadian Mixed Doubles Ranking qualifiers ===
Female	Male	Province / Territory
Melissa Adams	Alex Robichaud	New Brunswick
Jennifer Armstrong (Note: Jennifer Armstrong replaced Kerri Einarson who was representing Canada at the 2023 World Women's Curling Championship.)	Brad Jacobs	Saskatchewan / Northern Ontario
Veronique Bouchard	Jean-François Charest	Quebec
Lauren Cheal	Greg Cheal	Quebec
Émilie Desjardins	Robert Desjardins	Quebec
Clancy Grandy (Note: Clancy Grandy replaced Shannon Birchard who was representing Canada at the 2023 World Women's Curling Championship.)	John Morris	British Columbia / Alberta
Patty Hersikorn	Steve Laycock	Saskatchewan
Rachel Homan	Tyler Tardi	Alberta / British Columbia
Jennifer Jones	Brent Laing	Ontario
Chaelynn Kitz	Brayden Stewart	Saskatchewan
Nancy Martin	Tyrel Griffith	Saskatchewan / British Columbia
Paige Papley	Evan van Amsterdam	Alberta
Jocelyn Peterman	Brett Gallant	Alberta
Laurie St-Georges	Félix Asselin	Quebec
Brittany Tran	Aaron Sluchinski	Alberta
Kim Tuck	Wayne Tuck	Ontario
Laura Walker	Kirk Muyres	Alberta / Saskatchewan
Lauren Wasylkiw	Shane Konings	Ontario
Lisa Weagle	John Epping	Ontario

== Round robin standings ==
Final Round Robin Standings

Key
Teams to Playoffs

Pool A	W	L	LSD
(Alberta) Peterman / Gallant	7	0	399.8
(Alberta) (British Columbia) Homan / Tardi	6	1	299.4
(Saskatchewan) Hersikorn / Laycock	5	2	490.7
(British Columbia) (Alberta) Grandy / Morris	3	4	477.1
(Quebec) Desjardins / Desjardins	2	5	251.3
(Alberta) Kalk / MacAlpine	2	5	552.4
(British Columbia) Loken / Tanaka	2	5	639.1
(Yukon) Wallingham / Robinson	1	6	1252.7

Pool B	W	L	LSD
(Saskatchewan) Kitz / Stewart	6	1	618.0
(Ontario) Kreviazuk / Mathers	5	2	416.1
(Nova Scotia) Everist / Everist	5	2	344.1
(Saskatchewan) (British Columbia) Martin / Griffith	5	2	607.3
(Alberta) Papley / Van Amsterdam	3	4	567.8
(Quebec) Cheal / Cheal	2	5	564.8
(Newfoundland and Labrador) Wiseman / Skanes	1	6	432.2
(Ontario) Tuck / Tuck	1	6	358.2

Pool C	W	L	LSD
(Alberta) (Saskatchewan) Walker / Muyres	7	0	634.5
(Quebec) St-Georges / Asselin	6	1	493.7
(Alberta) Tran / Sluchinski	5	2	446.9
(Saskatchewan) (Northern Ontario) Armstrong / Jacobs	4	3	304.0
(Quebec) Riley / Mullen	3	4	385.3
(Prince Edward Island) White / White	1	6	484.2
(New Brunswick) Thompson / Sullivan	1	6	501.2
(Quebec) Bouchard / Charest	1	6	530.8

Pool D	W	L	LSD
(Ontario) Jones / Laing	7	0	318.4
(Manitoba) Lott / Lott	5	2	364.5
(Ontario) Weagle / Epping	5	2	380.9
(Northern Ontario) Fleury / Horgan	4	3	303.5
(New Brunswick) Adams / Robichaud	3	4	318.7
(Northwest Territories) Flemming / Koe	3	4	405.3
(Saskatchewan) Bukurak / Bukurak	1	6	516.2
(Ontario) Wasylkiw / Konings	0	7	517.6

== Round robin results ==
All draws are listed in Eastern Time (UTC−04:00).

=== Draw 1 ===
Tuesday, March 21, 6:00 pm

Sheet A	1	2	3	4	5	6	7	8	Final
(Yukon) Wallingham / Robinson	0	2	0	2	1	0	0	1	6
(Saskatchewan) Hersikorn / Laycock	1	0	2	0	0	1	3	0	7

Sheet B	1	2	3	4	5	6	7	8	Final
(Alberta) Kalk / MacAlpine	0	0	0	0	0	1	1	X	2
(British Columbia) (Alberta) Grandy / Morris	1	1	1	1	2	0	0	X	6

Sheet C	1	2	3	4	5	6	7	8	Final
(Alberta) Peterman / Gallant	0	0	0	3	1	0	2	1	7
(Alberta) (British Columbia) Homan / Tardi	1	1	1	0	0	1	0	0	4

Sheet D	1	2	3	4	5	6	7	8	Final
(Quebec) Desjardins / Desjardins	0	1	0	1	0	0	2	0	4
(British Columbia) Loken / Tanaka	2	0	1	0	1	1	0	2	7

Sheet E	1	2	3	4	5	6	7	8	Final
(Newfoundland and Labrador) Wiseman / Skanes	0	2	0	2	2	0	0	2	8
(Ontario) Tuck / Tuck	2	0	1	0	0	2	1	0	6

Sheet F	1	2	3	4	5	6	7	8	Final
(Nova Scotia) Everist / Everist	0	3	0	2	0	2	0	2	9
(Quebec) Cheal / Cheal	1	0	4	0	1	0	1	0	7

Sheet G	1	2	3	4	5	6	7	8	Final
(Saskatchewan) (British Columbia) Martin / Griffith	0	2	0	0	3	0	2	1	8
(Alberta) Papley / van Amsterdam	1	0	1	1	0	2	0	0	5

Sheet H	1	2	3	4	5	6	7	8	Final
(Saskatchewan) Kitz / Stewart	0	4	1	1	2	0	X	X	8
(Ontario) Kreviazuk / Mathers	2	0	0	0	0	1	X	X	3

=== Draw 2 ===
Tuesday, March 21, 9:00 pm

Sheet A	1	2	3	4	5	6	7	8	Final
(New Brunswick) Thompson / Sullivan	0	2	0	0	2	1	0	1	6
(Quebec) Bouchard / Charest	1	0	4	1	0	0	1	0	7

Sheet B	1	2	3	4	5	6	7	8	Final
(Prince Edward Island) White / White	0	1	0	0	1	0	X	X	2
(Saskatchewan) (Northern Ontario) Armstrong / Jacobs	1	0	3	1	0	3	X	X	8

Sheet C	1	2	3	4	5	6	7	8	Final
(Alberta) (Saskatchewan) Walker / Muyres	2	0	1	1	1	0	2	1	8
(Alberta) Tran / Sluchinski	0	4	0	0	0	3	0	0	7

Sheet D	1	2	3	4	5	6	7	8	Final
(Quebec) St-Georges / Asselin	1	1	0	3	0	1	0	1	7
(Quebec) Riley / Mullen	0	0	3	0	1	0	2	0	6

Sheet E	1	2	3	4	5	6	7	8	Final
(Northwest Territories) Flemming / Koe	1	2	0	2	2	0	1	X	8
(Ontario) Wasylkiw / Konings	0	0	3	0	0	2	0	X	5

Sheet F	1	2	3	4	5	6	7	8	Final
(Saskatchewan) Bukurak / Bukurak	1	0	1	0	3	0	0	0	5
(New Brunswick) Adams / Robichaud	0	1	0	1	0	3	3	1	9

Sheet G	1	2	3	4	5	6	7	8	Final
(Ontario) Weagle / Epping	0	1	0	1	0	0	0	X	2
(Manitoba) Lott / Lott	2	0	1	0	3	1	1	X	8

Sheet H	1	2	3	4	5	6	7	8	Final
(Ontario) Jones / Laing	2	0	0	1	0	3	0	X	6
(Northern Ontario) Fleury / Horgan	0	1	1	0	1	0	1	X	4

=== Draw 3 ===
Wednesday, March 22, 10:00 am

Sheet A	1	2	3	4	5	6	7	8	Final
(Nova Scotia) Everist / Everist	1	1	0	2	0	0	1	0	5
(Saskatchewan) Kitz / Stewart	0	0	1	0	2	2	0	2	7

Sheet B	1	2	3	4	5	6	7	8	Final
(Quebec) Cheal / Cheal	0	0	0	2	0	2	0	X	4
(Ontario) Kreviazuk / Mathers	1	1	1	0	3	0	2	X	8

Sheet C	1	2	3	4	5	6	7	8	9	Final
(Saskatchewan) (British Columbia) Martin / Griffith	0	2	1	0	1	0	1	0	1	6
(Ontario) Tuck / Tuck	1	0	0	1	0	1	0	2	0	5

Sheet D	1	2	3	4	5	6	7	8	Final
(Alberta) Papley / van Amsterdam	1	1	0	2	1	1	0	X	6
(Newfoundland and Labrador) Wiseman / Skanes	0	0	1	0	0	0	1	X	2

Sheet E	1	2	3	4	5	6	7	8	Final
(Alberta) Kalk / MacAlpine	0	0	0	0	2	1	0	X	3
(Quebec) Desjardins / Desjardins	2	1	2	1	0	0	1	X	7

Sheet F	1	2	3	4	5	6	7	8	Final
(British Columbia) (Alberta) Grandy / Morris	0	0	1	0	2	0	2	1	6
(British Columbia) Loken / Tanaka	1	1	0	4	0	1	0	0	7

Sheet G	1	2	3	4	5	6	7	8	Final
(Alberta) Peterman / Gallant	0	1	2	1	1	1	0	1	7
(Saskatchewan) Hersikorn / Laycock	3	0	0	0	0	0	2	0	5

Sheet H	1	2	3	4	5	6	7	8	Final
(Alberta) (British Columbia) Homan / Tardi	1	3	1	2	0	4	X	X	11
(Yukon) Wallingham / Robinson	0	0	0	0	3	0	X	X	3

=== Draw 4 ===
Wednesday, March 22, 1:00 pm

Sheet A	1	2	3	4	5	6	7	8	Final
(Saskatchewan) Bukurak / Bukurak	1	0	1	0	1	0	X	X	3
(Ontario) Jones / Laing	0	3	0	3	0	3	X	X	9

Sheet B	1	2	3	4	5	6	7	8	Final
(New Brunswick) Adams / Robichaud	0	1	1	0	0	1	0	X	3
(Northern Ontario) Fleury / Horgan	2	0	0	4	1	0	1	X	8

Sheet C	1	2	3	4	5	6	7	8	Final
(Ontario) Weagle / Epping	1	0	0	1	1	0	2	1	6
(Ontario) Wasylkiw / Konings	0	1	1	0	0	2	0	0	4

Sheet D	1	2	3	4	5	6	7	8	Final
(Manitoba) Lott / Lott	1	0	3	0	1	0	1	0	6
(Northwest Territories) Flemming / Koe	0	1	0	2	0	1	0	1	5

Sheet E	1	2	3	4	5	6	7	8	Final
(Prince Edward Island) White / White	2	0	0	0	1	0	0	0	3
(Quebec) St-Georges / Asselin	0	2	1	1	0	1	1	1	7

Sheet F	1	2	3	4	5	6	7	8	Final
(Saskatchewan) (Northern Ontario) Armstrong / Jacobs	1	0	1	0	1	1	0	2	6
(Quebec) Riley / Mullen	0	1	0	1	0	0	2	0	4

Sheet G	1	2	3	4	5	6	7	8	Final
(Alberta) (Saskatchewan) Walker / Muyres	0	1	0	2	1	4	X	X	8
(Quebec) Bouchard / Charest	1	0	1	0	0	0	X	X	2

Sheet H	1	2	3	4	5	6	7	8	Final
(Alberta) Tran / Sluchinski	0	2	2	0	1	0	0	2	7
(New Brunswick) Thompson / Sullivan	1	0	0	2	0	2	1	0	6

=== Draw 5 ===
Wednesday, March 22, 4:00 pm

Sheet A	1	2	3	4	5	6	7	8	Final
(British Columbia) Loken / Tanaka	0	0	0	1	0	1	X	X	2
(Alberta) Peterman / Gallant	1	2	2	0	2	0	X	X	7

Sheet B	1	2	3	4	5	6	7	8	Final
(Alberta) (British Columbia) Homan / Tardi	0	4	1	0	1	0	2	X	8
(Quebec) Desjardins / Desjardins	1	0	0	2	0	1	0	X	4

Sheet C	1	2	3	4	5	6	7	8	Final
(Yukon) Wallingham / Robinson	1	0	0	0	0	0	X	X	1
(British Columbia) (Alberta) Grandy / Morris	0	1	1	2	2	2	X	X	8

Sheet D	1	2	3	4	5	6	7	8	Final
(Saskatchewan) Hersikorn / Laycock	2	1	1	0	2	1	0	X	7
(Alberta) Kalk / MacAlpine	0	0	0	1	0	0	2	X	3

Sheet E	1	2	3	4	5	6	7	8	Final
(Ontario) Kreviazuk / Mathers	0	1	0	2	0	2	0	1	6
(Saskatchewan) (British Columbia) Martin / Griffith	1	0	1	0	1	0	2	0	5

Sheet F	1	2	3	4	5	6	7	8	Final
(Alberta) Papley / van Amsterdam	1	0	0	0	0	2	0	2	5
(Saskatchewan) Kitz / Stewart	0	1	1	1	1	0	2	0	6

Sheet G	1	2	3	4	5	6	7	8	Final
(Newfoundland and Labrador) Wiseman / Skanes	0	1	0	0	0	2	0	X	3
(Quebec) Cheal / Cheal	3	0	1	1	1	0	1	X	7

Sheet H	1	2	3	4	5	6	7	8	Final
(Ontario) Tuck / Tuck	1	0	1	0	0	0	X	X	2
(Nova Scotia) Everist / Everist	0	3	0	1	2	1	X	X	7

=== Draw 6 ===
Wednesday, March 22, 7:00 pm

Sheet A	1	2	3	4	5	6	7	8	Final
(Quebec) Riley / Mullen	0	0	1	0	4	0	X	X	5
(Alberta) (Saskatchewan) Walker / Muyres	2	1	0	4	0	3	X	X	10

Sheet B	1	2	3	4	5	6	7	8	Final
(Alberta) Tran / Sluchinski	1	0	0	0	0	3	0	X	4
(Quebec) St-Georges / Asselin	0	1	1	3	3	0	2	X	10

Sheet C	1	2	3	4	5	6	7	8	Final
(New Brunswick) Thompson / Sullivan	0	1	0	0	0	0	X	X	1
(Saskatchewan) (Northern Ontario) Armstrong / Jacobs	2	0	3	3	2	2	X	X	12

Sheet D	1	2	3	4	5	6	7	8	9	Final
(Quebec) Bouchard / Charest	2	3	0	2	0	1	0	0	0	8
(Prince Edward Island) White / White	0	0	2	0	3	0	2	1	2	10

Sheet E	1	2	3	4	5	6	7	8	Final
(Northern Ontario) Fleury / Horgan	1	0	0	1	0	2	0	X	4
(Ontario) Weagle / Epping	0	1	1	0	2	0	5	X	9

Sheet F	1	2	3	4	5	6	7	8	9	Final
(Manitoba) Lott / Lott	1	0	1	0	1	1	0	1	0	5
(Ontario) Jones / Laing	0	3	0	1	0	0	1	0	1	6

Sheet G	1	2	3	4	5	6	7	8	Final
(Northwest Territories) Flemming / Koe	0	1	1	0	0	3	0	X	5
(New Brunswick) Adams / Robichaud	1	0	0	4	1	0	3	X	9

Sheet H	1	2	3	4	5	6	7	8	Final
(Ontario) Wasylkiw / Konings	0	0	0	0	1	0	1	X	2
(Saskatchewan) Bukurak / Bukurak	1	2	1	1	0	1	0	X	6

=== Draw 7 ===
Thursday, March 23, 10:00 am

Sheet A	1	2	3	4	5	6	7	8	Final
(Quebec) St-Georges / Asselin	3	0	2	1	0	0	2	1	9
(New Brunswick) Thompson / Sullivan	0	4	0	0	2	2	0	0	8

Sheet B	1	2	3	4	5	6	7	8	Final
(Quebec) Riley / Mullen	0	1	0	5	1	0	3	X	10
(Quebec) Bouchard / Charest	1	0	2	0	0	2	0	X	5

Sheet C	1	2	3	4	5	6	7	8	Final
(Prince Edward Island) White / White	0	0	2	0	2	0	1	X	5
(Alberta) (Saskatchewan) Walker / Muyres	1	3	0	2	0	4	0	X	10

Sheet D	1	2	3	4	5	6	7	8	Final
(Saskatchewan) (Northern Ontario) Armstrong / Jacobs	0	1	0	0	3	0	X	X	4
(Alberta) Tran / Sluchinski	1	0	3	2	0	4	X	X	10

Sheet E	1	2	3	4	5	6	7	8	Final
(Ontario) Jones / Laing	0	0	3	1	2	0	3	X	9
(Northwest Territories) Flemming / Koe	1	1	0	0	0	1	0	X	3

Sheet F	1	2	3	4	5	6	7	8	Final
(Northern Ontario) Fleury / Horgan	2	0	3	0	2	0	2	X	9
(Ontario) Wasylkiw / Konings	0	1	0	1	0	1	0	X	3

Sheet G	1	2	3	4	5	6	7	8	9	Final
(Saskatchewan) Bukurak / Bukurak	0	1	1	1	0	1	0	1	0	5
(Ontario) Weagle / Epping	1	0	0	0	1	0	3	0	1	6

Sheet H	1	2	3	4	5	6	7	8	Final
(New Brunswick) Adams / Robichaud	1	0	0	1	0	1	0	X	3
(Manitoba) Lott / Lott	0	2	1	0	3	0	4	X	10

=== Draw 8 ===
Thursday, March 23, 1:00 pm

Sheet A	1	2	3	4	5	6	7	8	Final
(Quebec) Desjardins / Desjardins	3	1	2	2	0	4	X	X	12
(Yukon) Wallingham / Robinson	0	0	0	0	1	0	X	X	1

Sheet B	1	2	3	4	5	6	7	8	Final
(British Columbia) Loken / Tanaka	0	0	1	0	1	0	0	X	2
(Saskatchewan) Hersikorn / Laycock	1	1	0	1	0	1	2	X	6

Sheet C	1	2	3	4	5	6	7	8	Final
(Alberta) Kalk / MacAlpine	0	0	0	0	1	0	X	X	1
(Alberta) Peterman / Gallant	2	3	1	1	0	2	X	X	9

Sheet D	1	2	3	4	5	6	7	8	Final
(British Columbia) (Alberta) Grandy / Morris	0	1	0	0	0	1	X	X	2
(Alberta) (British Columbia) Homan / Tardi	3	0	1	1	1	0	X	X	6

Sheet E	1	2	3	4	5	6	7	8	Final
(Saskatchewan) Kitz / Stewart	0	3	0	4	1	0	3	X	11
(Newfoundland and Labrador) Wiseman / Skanes	1	0	1	0	0	4	0	X	6

Sheet F	1	2	3	4	5	6	7	8	Final
(Ontario) Kreviazuk / Mathers	2	0	3	1	0	3	1	X	10
(Ontario) Tuck / Tuck	0	3	0	0	2	0	0	X	5

Sheet G	1	2	3	4	5	6	7	8	Final
(Nova Scotia) Everist / Everist	1	0	3	0	2	0	0	1	7
(Saskatchewan) (British Columbia) Martin / Griffith	0	1	0	1	0	2	1	0	5

Sheet H	1	2	3	4	5	6	7	8	Final
(Quebec) Cheal / Cheal	0	0	2	0	0	1	0	X	3
(Alberta) Papley / van Amsterdam	1	5	0	1	1	0	1	X	9

=== Draw 9 ===
Thursday, March 23, 4:00 pm

Sheet A	1	2	3	4	5	6	7	8	Final
(Ontario) Wasylkiw / Konings	0	0	1	0	2	0	0	X	3
(Manitoba) Lott / Lott	1	3	0	3	0	2	1	X	10

Sheet B	1	2	3	4	5	6	7	8	Final
(Northwest Territories) Flemming / Koe	0	0	1	0	1	1	0	X	3
(Ontario) Weagle / Epping	2	4	0	2	0	0	1	X	9

Sheet C	1	2	3	4	5	6	7	8	Final
(Ontario) Jones / Laing	0	0	1	0	3	0	2	2	8
(New Brunswick) Adams / Robichaud	1	1	0	1	0	2	0	0	5

Sheet D	1	2	3	4	5	6	7	8	Final
(Northern Ontario) Fleury / Horgan	1	1	1	0	2	2	0	X	7
(Saskatchewan) Bukurak / Bukurak	0	0	0	1	0	0	2	X	3

Sheet E	1	2	3	4	5	6	7	8	Final
(Quebec) Bouchard / Charest	0	0	2	0	2	0	2	0	6
(Alberta) Tran / Sluchinski	1	1	0	2	0	4	0	2	10

Sheet F	1	2	3	4	5	6	7	8	Final
(New Brunswick) Thompson / Sullivan	1	1	0	1	0	2	0	0	5
(Alberta) (Saskatchewan) Walker / Muyres	0	0	3	0	2	0	3	1	9

Sheet G	1	2	3	4	5	6	7	8	Final
(Quebec) St-Georges / Asselin	0	0	1	0	4	2	2	X	9
(Saskatchewan) (Northern Ontario) Armstrong / Jacobs	2	1	0	1	0	0	0	X	4

Sheet H	1	2	3	4	5	6	7	8	Final
(Quebec) Riley / Mullen	0	2	2	1	1	1	0	1	8
(Prince Edward Island) White / White	2	0	0	0	0	0	2	0	4

=== Draw 10 ===
Thursday, March 23, 7:00 pm

Sheet A	1	2	3	4	5	6	7	8	Final
(Ontario) Tuck / Tuck	1	1	2	0	2	2	0	0	8
(Alberta) Papley / van Amsterdam	0	0	0	4	0	0	1	2	7

Sheet B	1	2	3	4	5	6	7	8	Final
(Newfoundland and Labrador) Wiseman / Skanes	0	3	0	0	3	0	0	0	6
(Saskatchewan) (British Columbia) Martin / Griffith	2	0	2	1	0	2	1	1	9

Sheet C	1	2	3	4	5	6	7	8	9	Final
(Saskatchewan) Kitz / Stewart	2	0	2	2	2	0	0	0	1	9
(Quebec) Cheal / Cheal	0	3	0	0	0	2	1	2	0	8

Sheet D	1	2	3	4	5	6	7	8	Final
(Ontario) Kreviazuk / Mathers	1	0	1	2	0	3	4	X	11
(Nova Scotia) Everist / Everist	0	1	0	0	3	0	0	X	4

Sheet E	1	2	3	4	5	6	7	8	Final
(Saskatchewan) Hersikorn / Laycock	0	0	2	1	0	0	2	0	5
(Alberta) (British Columbia) Homan / Tardi	3	1	0	0	1	1	0	1	7

Sheet F	1	2	3	4	5	6	7	8	Final
(Yukon) Wallingham / Robinson	0	0	2	1	0	1	0	X	4
(Alberta) Peterman / Gallant	2	1	0	0	1	0	3	X	7

Sheet G	1	2	3	4	5	6	7	8	Final
(Quebec) Desjardins / Desjardins	0	0	1	0	3	0	0	X	4
(British Columbia) (Alberta) Grandy / Morris	1	2	0	1	0	1	1	X	6

Sheet H	1	2	3	4	5	6	7	8	Final
(British Columbia) Loken / Tanaka	1	0	0	2	0	2	0	2	7
(Alberta) Kalk / MacAlpine	0	1	3	0	3	0	1	0	8

=== Draw 11 ===
Friday, March 24, 10:00 am

Sheet A	1	2	3	4	5	6	7	8	Final
(Ontario) Weagle / Epping	2	1	0	3	0	0	0	1	7
(New Brunswick) Adams / Robichaud	0	0	1	0	3	1	1	0	6

Sheet B	1	2	3	4	5	6	7	8	Final
(Manitoba) Lott / Lott	2	1	0	1	1	0	1	X	6
(Saskatchewan) Bukurak / Bukurak	0	0	1	0	0	1	0	X	2

Sheet C	1	2	3	4	5	6	7	8	Final
(Northwest Territories) Flemming / Koe	1	1	0	2	0	3	0	1	8
(Northern Ontario) Fleury / Horgan	0	0	4	0	2	0	1	0	7

Sheet D	1	2	3	4	5	6	7	8	Final
(Ontario) Wasylkiw / Konings	0	2	0	0	3	0	1	X	6
(Ontario) Jones / Laing	3	0	1	4	0	2	0	X	10

Sheet E	1	2	3	4	5	6	7	8	Final
(Alberta) (Saskatchewan) Walker / Muyres	0	1	1	0	1	1	0	2	6
(Saskatchewan) (Northern Ontario) Armstrong / Jacobs	1	0	0	1	0	0	1	0	3

Sheet F	1	2	3	4	5	6	7	8	Final
(Alberta) Tran / Sluchinski	3	0	0	3	0	4	X	X	10
(Prince Edward Island) White / White	0	1	1	0	0	0	X	X	2

Sheet G	1	2	3	4	5	6	7	8	Final
(New Brunswick) Thompson / Sullivan	0	1	0	1	0	0	2	0	4
(Quebec) Riley / Mullen	2	0	1	0	2	1	0	1	7

Sheet H	1	2	3	4	5	6	7	8	Final
(Quebec) Bouchard / Charest	0	0	2	0	1	1	0	0	4
(Quebec) St-Georges / Asselin	3	1	0	2	0	0	1	0	7

=== Draw 12 ===
Friday, March 24, 1:00 pm

Sheet A	1	2	3	4	5	6	7	8	Final
(Saskatchewan) (British Columbia) Martin / Griffith	6	1	0	2	1	1	X	X	11
(Quebec) Cheal / Cheal	0	0	2	0	0	0	X	X	2

Sheet B	1	2	3	4	5	6	7	8	Final
(Alberta) Papley / van Amsterdam	0	4	0	4	0	0	1	0	9
(Nova Scotia) Everist / Everist	4	0	1	0	2	1	0	2	10

Sheet C	1	2	3	4	5	6	7	8	Final
(Newfoundland and Labrador) Wiseman / Skanes	0	1	0	5	0	2	1	0	9
(Ontario) Kreviazuk / Mathers	2	0	3	0	2	0	0	3	10

Sheet D	1	2	3	4	5	6	7	8	Final
(Ontario) Tuck / Tuck	0	0	1	2	0	1	0	0	4
(Saskatchewan) Kitz / Stewart	1	1	0	0	2	0	1	2	7

Sheet E	1	2	3	4	5	6	7	8	Final
(Alberta) Peterman / Gallant	1	0	3	0	1	0	0	2	7
(British Columbia) (Alberta) Grandy / Morris	0	1	0	2	0	2	1	0	6

Sheet F	1	2	3	4	5	6	7	8	Final
(Alberta) (British Columbia) Homan / Tardi	2	0	2	1	1	0	2	X	8
(Alberta) Kalk / MacAlpine	0	1	0	0	0	2	0	X	3

Sheet G	1	2	3	4	5	6	7	8	Final
(Yukon) Wallingham / Robinson	1	0	2	0	2	2	1	X	8
(British Columbia) Loken / Tanaka	0	4	0	2	0	0	0	X	6

Sheet H	1	2	3	4	5	6	7	8	Final
(Saskatchewan) Hersikorn / Laycock	1	0	0	3	0	4	3	X	11
(Quebec) Desjardins / Desjardins	0	2	2	0	1	0	0	X	5

=== Draw 13 ===
Friday, March 24, 4:00 pm

Sheet A	1	2	3	4	5	6	7	8	Final
(Alberta) Tran / Sluchinski	3	1	0	2	1	3	X	X	10
(Quebec) Riley / Mullen	0	0	1	0	0	0	X	X	1

Sheet B	1	2	3	4	5	6	7	8	Final
(Alberta) (Saskatchewan) Walker / Muyres	0	3	0	1	1	0	2	0	7
(Quebec) St-Georges / Asselin	1	0	1	0	0	3	0	1	6

Sheet C	1	2	3	4	5	6	7	8	Final
(Saskatchewan) (Northern Ontario) Armstrong / Jacobs	1	0	1	0	2	0	3	X	7
(Quebec) Bouchard / Charest	0	1	0	1	0	1	0	X	3

Sheet D	1	2	3	4	5	6	7	8	Final
(Prince Edward Island) White / White	0	0	2	0	1	1	0	X	4
(New Brunswick) Thompson / Sullivan	2	1	0	3	0	0	3	X	9

Sheet E	1	2	3	4	5	6	7	8	Final
(Manitoba) Lott / Lott	1	1	0	0	0	3	0	0	5
(Northern Ontario) Fleury / Horgan	0	0	1	1	1	0	4	1	8

Sheet F	1	2	3	4	5	6	7	8	Final
(Ontario) Weagle / Epping	0	0	0	2	0	2	1	1	6
(Ontario) Jones / Laing	2	2	1	0	2	0	0	0	7

Sheet G	1	2	3	4	5	6	7	8	Final
(New Brunswick) Adams / Robichaud	1	1	0	4	0	0	0	3	9
(Ontario) Wasylkiw / Konings	0	0	1	0	2	1	1	0	5

Sheet H	1	2	3	4	5	6	7	8	Final
(Saskatchewan) Bukurak / Bukurak	1	0	2	0	0	3	0	X	6
(Northwest Territories) Flemming / Koe	0	3	0	2	2	0	4	X	11

=== Draw 14 ===
Friday, March 24, 7:00 pm

Sheet A	1	2	3	4	5	6	7	8	Final
(Alberta) (British Columbia) Homan / Tardi	5	0	2	1	1	0	X	X	9
(British Columbia) Loken / Tanaka	0	1	0	0	0	1	X	X	2

Sheet B	1	2	3	4	5	6	7	8	Final
(Alberta) Peterman / Gallant	1	0	3	0	1	1	0	0	6
(Quebec) Desjardins / Desjardins	0	1	0	2	0	0	1	0	4

Sheet C	1	2	3	4	5	6	7	8	Final
(British Columbia) (Alberta) Grandy / Morris	0	0	3	0	1	1	1	0	6
(Saskatchewan) Hersikorn / Laycock	1	3	0	2	0	0	0	3	9

Sheet D	1	2	3	4	5	6	7	8	Final
(Alberta) Kalk / MacAlpine	2	1	2	0	0	4	X	X	9
(Yukon) Wallingham / Robinson	0	0	0	1	1	0	X	X	2

Sheet E	1	2	3	4	5	6	7	8	Final
(Alberta) Papley / van Amsterdam	0	1	0	1	0	0	2	1	5
(Ontario) Kreviazuk / Mathers	1	0	1	0	1	1	0	0	4

Sheet F	1	2	3	4	5	6	7	8	Final
(Saskatchewan) (British Columbia) Martin / Griffith	3	0	1	0	0	1	0	3	8
(Saskatchewan) Kitz / Stewart	0	1	0	1	1	0	1	0	4

Sheet G	1	2	3	4	5	6	7	8	Final
(Quebec) Cheal / Cheal	0	3	3	0	1	1	X	X	8
(Ontario) Tuck / Tuck	1	0	0	2	0	0	X	X	3

Sheet H	1	2	3	4	5	6	7	8	Final
(Nova Scotia) Everist / Everist	0	1	0	2	1	3	0	1	8
(Newfoundland and Labrador) Wiseman / Skanes	1	0	1	0	0	0	2	0	4

== Playoffs ==
Qualification Games
8	(Manitoba) Lott / Lott	6
9	(Ontario) Weagle / Epping	8
5	(Alberta) (British Columbia) Homan / Tardi	7
12	(Saskatchewan) Hersikorn / Laycock	5
7	(Nova Scotia) Everist / Everist	4
10	(Ontario) Kreviazuk / Mathers	6
6	(Quebec) St-Georges / Asselin	4
11	(Alberta) Tran / Sluchinski	8

Quarterfinals
1	(Ontario) Jones / Laing	7
9	(Ontario) Weagle / Epping	2
4	(Saskatchewan) Kitz / Stewart	5
5	(Alberta) (British Columbia) Homan / Tardi	6
2	(Alberta) Peterman/Gallant	8
10	(Ontario) Kreviazuk / Mathers	1
3	(Alberta) (Saskatchewan) Walker / Muyres	6
11	(Alberta) Tran / Sluchinski	7

Semifinals
1	(Ontario) Jones / Laing	6
5	(Alberta) (British Columbia) Homan / Tardi	5
2	(Alberta) Peterman / Gallant	7
11	(Alberta) Tran / Sluchinski	6

Final
1	(Ontario) Jones / Laing	9
2	(Alberta) Peterman / Gallant	4

=== Qualification games ===
Saturday, March 25, 3:00 pm

Sheet A	1	2	3	4	5	6	7	8	Final
(Manitoba) Lott / Lott	1	0	3	0	0	0	2	X	6
(Ontario) Weagle / Epping	0	3	0	3	1	1	0	X	8

Sheet B	1	2	3	4	5	6	7	8	Final
(Quebec) St-Georges / Asselin	1	0	1	0	2	0	0	X	4
(Alberta) Tran / Sluchinski	0	1	0	4	0	2	1	X	8

Sheet C	1	2	3	4	5	6	7	8	Final
(Nova Scotia) Everist / Everist	0	1	0	1	0	2	0	0	4
(Ontario) Kreviazuk / Mathers	1	0	2	0	1	0	1	1	6

Sheet D	1	2	3	4	5	6	7	8	Final
(Alberta) (British Columbia) Homan / Tardi	0	2	0	0	1	0	2	2	7
(Saskatchewan) Hersikorn / Laycock	1	0	2	1	0	1	0	0	5

=== Quarterfinals ===
Saturday, March 25, 7:00 pm

Sheet A	1	2	3	4	5	6	7	8	Final
(Saskatchewan) Kitz / Stewart	1	0	0	1	0	3	0	0	5
(Alberta) (British Columbia) Homan / Tardi	0	1	1	0	1	0	2	1	6

Sheet B	1	2	3	4	5	6	7	8	Final
(Alberta) Peterman / Gallant	0	3	1	2	2	X	X	X	8
(Ontario) Kreviazuk / Mathers	1	0	0	0	0	X	X	X	1

Sheet C	1	2	3	4	5	6	7	8	Final
(Ontario) Jones / Laing	2	1	2	1	1	0	X	X	7
(Ontario) Weagle / Epping	0	0	0	0	0	2	X	X	2

Sheet D	1	2	3	4	5	6	7	8	Final
(Alberta) (Saskatchewan) Walker / Muyres	0	0	1	0	2	0	2	1	6
(Alberta) Tran / Sluchinski	2	1	0	1	0	3	0	0	7

=== Semifinals ===
Sunday, March 26, 9:30 am

Sheet B	1	2	3	4	5	6	7	8	Final
(Ontario) Jones / Laing	3	0	0	1	0	1	0	1	6
(Alberta) (British Columbia) Homan / Tardi	0	2	1	0	1	0	1	0	5

Sheet C	1	2	3	4	5	6	7	8	9	Final
(Alberta) Peterman / Gallant	0	1	0	1	0	3	1	0	1	7
(Alberta) Tran / Sluchinski	2	0	2	0	1	0	0	1	0	6

=== Final ===
Sunday, March 26, 1:00 pm

Sheet C	1	2	3	4	5	6	7	8	Final
(Ontario) Jones / Laing	1	0	1	0	0	2	0	5	9
(Alberta) Peterman / Gallant	0	1	0	1	1	0	1	0	4

== Final standings ==
Place	Team
1st place, gold medalist(s)	(Ontario) Jones / Laing
2nd place, silver medalist(s)	(Alberta) Peterman / Gallant
3rd place, bronze medalist(s)	(Alberta) (British Columbia) Homan / Tardi
3rd place, bronze medalist(s)	(Alberta) Tran / Sluchinski
5	(Alberta) (Saskatchewan) Walker / Muyres
6	(Saskatchewan) Kitz / Stewart
7	(Ontario) Weagle / Epping
8	(Ontario) Kreviazuk / Mathers
9	(Quebec) St-Georges / Asselin
10	(Nova Scotia) Everist / Everist
11	(Manitoba) Lott / Lott
12	(Saskatchewan) Hersikorn / Laycock
13	(Saskatchewan) (British Columbia) Martin / Griffith
14	(Northern Ontario) Fleury / Horgan
15	(Saskatchewan) (Northern Ontario) Armstrong / Jacobs
16	(New Brunswick) Adams / Robichaud
17	(Quebec) Riley / Mullen
18	(Northwest Territories) Flemming / Koe
19	(British Columbia) (Alberta) Grandy / Morris
20	(Alberta) Papley / Van Amsterdam
21	(Quebec) Desjardins / Desjardins
22	(Alberta) Kalk / MacAlpine
23	(Quebec) Cheal / Cheal
24	(British Columbia) Loken / Tanaka
25	(Newfoundland and Labrador) Wiseman / Skanes
26	(Ontario) Tuck / Tuck
27	(Prince Edward Island) White / White
28	(New Brunswick) Thompson / Sullivan
29	(Saskatchewan) Bukurak / Bukurak
30	(Quebec) Bouchard / Charest
31	(Yukon) Wallingham / Robinson
32	(Ontario) Wasylkiw / Konings
