= 2017 Canadian Mixed Doubles Curling Championship =

- Host city: Saskatoon, Saskatchewan
- Arena: Nutana Curling Club
- Dates: April 5–April 9
- Winner: (Alberta) (Manitoba) Courtney / Carruthers
- Curling club: Ottawa Curling Club & West St. Paul Curling Club
- Female: Joanne Courtney
- Male: Reid Carruthers
- Finalist: (Ontario) (Alberta) Homan / Morris

The 2017 Canadian Mixed Doubles Curling Championship were held from April 5 to April 9 at the Nutana Curling Club in Saskatoon, Saskatchewan.

== Teams ==
The teams are listed as follows:

=== Provincial and Territorial champions ===
Province / Territory	Male	Female	Clubs(s)
Alberta	Jason Ginter	Danielle Schmiemann	Saville Sports Centre
British Columbia	Jeff Richard	Sarah Wark	Kelowna Curling Club & Chilliwack Curling Club
Manitoba	Jason Gunnlaugson	Shannon Birchard	Granite Curling Club
New Brunswick	Charlie Sullivan	Leah Thompson	Thistle St. Andrews Curling Club
Newfoundland and Labrador	Ryan McNeil Lamswood	Sarah McNeil Lamswood	Caribou Curling Club
Northern Ontario	Dean Pigeau	Karen Pigeau	Sturgeon Falls Curling Club
Nova Scotia	Mark Dacey	Jennifer Baxter	Dartmouth Curling Club
Ontario	Tyler Stewart	Nicole Westlund Stewart	Kitchener-Waterloo Granite Club
Prince Edward Island	Kyle Holland	Sabrina Smith	Charlottetown Curling Complex & Cornwall Curling Club
Quebec	Félix Asselin	Jill Routledge	Glenmore Curling Club
Saskatchewan	Sam Wills	Mackenzie Schwartz	Lumsden Curling Club
Yukon	Wade Scoffin	Helen Strong	Whitehorse Curling Club

=== Open entries ===
Province / Territory	Male	Female
Alberta; Ontario	John Morris	Rachel Homan
Saskatchewan	Dustin Kalthoff	Marliese Kasner
Manitoba; Alberta	Colin Hodgson	Chelsea Carey
Ontario	Wayne Tuck Jr.	Kim Tuck
Ontario	Hugh Murphy	Janet Murphy
Saskatchewan; Manitoba	Pat Simmons	Jill Officer
Ontario	John Epping	Lisa Weagle
Manitoba; Alberta	Reid Carruthers	Joanne Courtney
Ontario; Manitoba	Ryan Fry	Kaitlyn Lawes
Alberta	Brendan Bottcher	Dana Ferguson
Saskatchewan	Mike Armstrong	Ashley Quick
Saskatchewan	Catlin Schneider	Nancy Martin
British Columbia	Jim Cotter	Jaelyn Cotter
Ontario	Shawn Cottrill	Katie Cottrill
Saskatchewan	Ryan Deis	Sherry Just
Ontario	Brent Laing	Jennifer Jones
Manitoba	Mike McEwen	Dawn McEwen
Alberta	Charley Thomas	Kalynn Virtue
Quebec	Robert Desjardins	Émilie Desjardins
Ontario	Mark Kean	Mallory Kean

== Round robin standings ==
Key
Teams to Playoffs
Teams to Tiebreaker

Pool A	W	L
(Ontario) (Alberta) Homan / Morris	7	0
(Saskatchewan) Kasner / Kalthoff	5	2
(Manitoba) Birchard / Gunnlaugson	5	2
(Ontario) Tuck / Tuck	4	3
(British Columbia) Wark / Richard	3	4
(Manitoba) (Saskatchewan) Officer / Simmons	2	5
(Prince Edward Island) Smith / Holland	1	6
(Quebec) Routledge / Asselin	1	6

Pool B	W	L
(Alberta) (Manitoba) Courtney / Carruthers	7	0
(Alberta) Ferguson / Bottcher	6	1
(Nova Scotia) Baxter / Dacey	5	2
(New Brunswick) Thompson/ Sullivan	4	3
(Saskatchewan) Quick / Armstrong	3	4
(Manitoba) (Ontario) Lawes / Fry	2	5
(Ontario) Westlund Stewart / Stewart	1	6
(Yukon) Strong / Scoffin	0	7

Pool C	W	L
(Saskatchewan) Just / Deis	6	1
(Alberta) (Manitoba) Carey / Hodgson	6	1
(Ontario) Weagle / Epping	5	2
(British Columbia) Cotter / Cotter	4	3
(Saskatchewan) Martin / Schneider	3	4
(Saskatchewan) Schwartz / Wills	2	5
(Ontario) Cotrill / Cottrill	1	6
(Newfoundland and Labrador) Lamswood / Lamswood	1	6

Pool D	W	L
(Manitoba) Jones / Laing	6	1
(Alberta) Virtue / Thomas	6	1
(Ontario) Murphy / Murphy	4	3
(Ontario) Kean / Kean	4	3
(Alberta) Schmiemann / Ginter	4	3
(Quebec) Desjardins / Desjardins	2	5
(Manitoba) McEwen / McEwen	2	5
(Northern Ontario) Pigeau / Pigeau	0	7

=== Draw 1 ===
Wednesday, April 5, 5:30 pm

Sheet A	1	2	3	4	5	6	7	8	Final
(Manitoba) Birchard/Gunnlaugson🔨	3	1	0	1	3	0	1	X	9
(Prince Edward Island) Smith/Holland	0	0	4	0	0	1	0	X	5

Sheet B	1	2	3	4	5	6	7	8	Final
(Ontario) Tuck/Tuck 🔨	1	0	3	0	5	2	0	X	11
(British Columbia) Wark/Richard	0	2	0	3	0	0	2	X	7

Sheet C	1	2	3	4	5	6	7	8	Final
(Ontario) (Alberta) Homan/Morris 🔨	2	3	0	3	1	1	X	X	10
(Quebec) Routledge/Asselin	0	0	3	0	0	0	X	X	3

Sheet D	1	2	3	4	5	6	7	8	Final
(Saskatchewan) Kasner/Kalthoff 🔨	0	1	1	2	0	4	2	X	10
(Manitoba) (Saskatchewan) Officer/Simmons	1	0	0	0	2	0	0	X	3

Sheet E	1	2	3	4	5	6	7	8	Final
(Alberta) Ferguson/Bottcher 🔨	2	0	3	0	3	1	0	X	9
(Yukon) Strong/Scoffin	0	1	0	3	0	0	1	X	5

Sheet F	1	2	3	4	5	6	7	8	Final
(Ontario) Westlund Stewart/Stewart	0	2	0	0	0	1	0	X	3
(Saskatchewan) Quick/Armstrong 🔨	2	0	2	1	2	0	1	X	8

Sheet G	1	2	3	4	5	6	7	8	Final
(Alberta) (Manitoba) Courtney/Carruthers 🔨	1	0	3	0	2	0	3	0	9
(New Brunswick) Thompson/Sullivan	0	2	0	2	0	2	0	2	8

Sheet H	1	2	3	4	5	6	7	8	Final
(Manitoba) (Ontario) Lawes/Fry 🔨	1	1	0	0	2	0	1	0	5
(Nova Scotia) Baxter/Dacey	0	0	2	1	0	3	0	0	6

=== Draw 2 ===
Wednesday, April 5, 8:30 pm

Sheet A	1	2	3	4	5	6	7	8	Final
(British Columbia) Cotter/Cotter🔨	3	0	1	3	1	0	1	X	9
(Saskatchewan) Schwartz/Wills	0	1	0	0	0	2	0	X	3

Sheet B	1	2	3	4	5	6	7	8	Final
(Alberta) (Manitoba) Carey/Hodgson	1	0	1	1	0	1	0	1	5
(Saskatchewan) Just/Deis 🔨	0	4	0	0	2	0	1	0	7

Sheet C	1	2	3	4	5	6	7	8	Final
(Saskatchewan) Martin/Schneider	0	1	1	2	0	0	1	2	7
(Newfoundland and Labrador) Lamswood/Lamswood 🔨	1	0	0	0	1	1	0	0	3

Sheet D	1	2	3	4	5	6	7	8	Final
(Ontario) Weagle/Epping	0	4	0	0	3	0	3	X	10
(Ontario) Cottrill/Cottrill 🔨	3	0	1	1	0	1	0	X	6

Sheet E	1	2	3	4	5	6	7	8	Final
(Alberta) Schiemann/Ginter	1	0	3	1	0	1	1	2	9
(Quebec) Desjardins/Desjardins 🔨	0	1	0	0	4	0	0	0	5

Sheet F	1	2	3	4	5	6	7	8	Final
(Alberta) Virtue/Thomas 🔨	1	0	5	0	0	5	X	X	11
(Ontario) Kean/Kean	0	2	0	2	1	0	X	X	5

Sheet G	1	2	3	4	5	6	7	8	Final
(Manitoba) Jones/Laing 🔨	2	0	3	1	0	3	X	X	9
(Northern Ontario) Pigeau/Pigeau	0	1	0	0	1	0	X	X	2

Sheet H	1	2	3	4	5	6	7	8	Final
(Manitoba) McEwen/McEwen	0	0	0	1	1	0	2	0	4
(Ontario) Murphy/Murphy 🔨	1	0	1	0	0	1	0	2	5

=== Draw 3 ===
Thursday, April 6, 8:30 am

Sheet A	1	2	3	4	5	6	7	8	Final
(British Columbia) Wark/Richard 🔨	0	0	0	1	0	0	X	X	1
(Ontario) (Alberta) Homan/Morris	1	1	1	0	1	2	X	X	6

Sheet B	1	2	3	4	5	6	7	8	Final
(Manitoba) Birchard/Gunnlaugson	0	0	2	1	3	0	2	0	8
(Manitoba) (Saskatchewan) Officer/Simmons 🔨	2	1	0	0	0	2	0	1	6

Sheet C	1	2	3	4	5	6	7	8	Final
(Saskatchewan) Kasner/Kalthoff 🔨	4	0	2	1	1	0	1	0	9
(Prince Edward Island) Smith/Holland	0	1	0	0	0	3	0	0	4

Sheet D	1	2	3	4	5	6	7	8	Final
(Quebec) Routledge/Asselin🔨	0	0	1	0	1	3	0	1	6
(Ontario) Tuck/Tuck	1	1	0	1	0	0	4	0	7

Sheet E	1	2	3	4	5	6	7	8	Final
(Saskatchewan) Quick/Armstrong	0	0	1	0	3	0	X	X	4
(Alberta) (Manitoba) Courtney/Carruthers 🔨	3	1	0	4	0	5	X	X	13

Sheet F	1	2	3	4	5	6	7	8	Final
(Nova Scotia) Baxter/Dacey 🔨	2	0	0	1	1	0	0	0	4
(Alberta) Ferguson/Bottcher	0	1	2	0	0	2	1	2	8

Sheet G	1	2	3	4	5	6	7	8	Final
(Yukon) Strong/Scoffin 🔨	2	0	2	0	0	3	0	X	7
(Manitoba) (Ontario) Lawes/Fry	0	4	0	3	2	0	3	X	12

Sheet H	1	2	3	4	5	6	7	8	Final
(New Brunswick) Thompson/Sullivan	0	1	0	0	2	1	0	3	7
(Ontario) Stewart/Stewart 🔨	1	0	1	1	0	0	2	0	5

=== Draw 4 ===
Thursday, April 6, 11:30 am

Sheet A	1	2	3	4	5	6	7	8	Final
(Saskatchewan) Just/Deis	0	0	3	1	0	2	0	2	8
(Saskatchewan) Martin/Schneider	2	1	0	0	1	0	1	0	5

Sheet B	1	2	3	4	5	6	7	8	Final
(British Columbia) Cotter/Cotter	0	2	0	1	0	0	1	X	4
(Ontario) Cottrill/Cottrill 🔨	1	0	3	0	2	3	0	X	9

Sheet C	1	2	3	4	5	6	7	8	Final
(Ontario) Weagle/Epping 🔨	2	0	2	1	0	1	3	X	9
(Saskatchewan) Schwartz/Wills	0	1	0	0	1	0	0	X	2

Sheet D	1	2	3	4	5	6	7	8	Final
(Newfoundland and Labrador) Lamswood/Lamswood 🔨	1	0	1	2	0	0	1	0	5
(Alberta) (Manitoba) Carey/Hodgson	0	1	0	0	1	3	0	1	6

Sheet E	1	2	3	4	5	6	7	8	Final
(Ontario) Kean/Kean	0	0	0	0	0	X	X	X	0
(Manitoba) Jones/Laing 🔨	3	1	1	1	2	X	X	X	9

Sheet F	1	2	3	4	5	6	7	8	Final
(Quebec) Desjardins/Desjardins	0	0	2	2	0	2	0	X	6
(Ontario) Murphy/Murphy 🔨	2	3	0	0	3	0	3	X	11

Sheet G	1	2	3	4	5	6	7	8	Final
(Manitoba) McEwen/McEwen 🔨	3	1	0	0	2	0	1	0	7
(Alberta) Schiemann/Ginter	0	0	1	1	0	3	0	1	6

Sheet H	1	2	3	4	5	6	7	8	Final
(Northern Ontario) Pigeau/Pigeau	0	1	0	0	0	1	X	X	2
(Alberta) Virtue/Thomas 🔨	2	0	4	2	4	0	X	X	12

=== Draw 5 ===
Thursday, April 6, 2:30 pm

Sheet A	1	2	3	4	5	6	7	8	Final
(Saskatchewan) Kasner/Kalthoff	0	4	0	1	0	1	0	2	8
(Quebec) Routledge/Asselin 🔨	2	0	2	0	1	0	2	0	7

Sheet B	1	2	3	4	5	6	7	8	Final
(Prince Edward Island) Smith/Holland	0	0	0	0	0	0	X	X	0
(Ontario) (Alberta) Homan/Morris 🔨	3	1	3	2	1	2	X	X	12

Sheet C	1	2	3	4	5	6	7	8	Final
(Manitoba) (Saskatchewan) Officer/Simmons 🔨	1	1	0	1	0	1	0	2	6
(Ontario) Tuck/Tuck	0	0	2	0	1	0	3	0	9

Sheet D	1	2	3	4	5	6	7	8	Final
(Manitoba) Birchard/Gunnlaugson	0	4	0	3	3	0	X	X	10
(British Columbia) Wark/Richard 🔨	1	0	1	0	0	2	X	X	4

Sheet E	1	2	3	4	5	6	7	8	Final
(New Brunswick) Thompson/Sullivan 🔨	4	0	1	2	1	1	X	X	9
(Manitoba) (Ontario) Lawes/Fry	0	2	0	0	0	0	X	X	2

Sheet F	1	2	3	4	5	6	7	8	Final
(Yukon) Strong/Scoffin	0	0	3	0	X	X	X	X	3
(Alberta) (Manitoba) Courtney/Carruthers 🔨	6	1	0	5	X	X	X	X	12

Sheet G	1	2	3	4	5	6	7	8	Final
(Nova Scotia) Baxter/Dacey 🔨	0	1	1	0	2	0	3	1	8
(Ontario) Stewart/Stewart	1	0	0	1	0	1	0	0	3

Sheet H	1	2	3	4	5	6	7	8	Final
(Saskatchewan) Quick/Armstrong 🔨	2	0	0	1	1	0	1	0	5
(Alberta) Ferguson/Bottcher	0	3	2	0	0	2	0	2	9

=== Draw 6 ===
Thursday, April 6, 5:30 pm

Sheet A	1	2	3	4	5	6	7	8	Final
(Ontario) Weagle/Epping	2	1	0	1	0	2	0	X	6
(Newfoundland and Labrador) Lamswood/Lamswood 🔨	0	0	1	0	1	0	2	X	4

Sheet B	1	2	3	4	5	6	7	8	Final
(Saskatchewan) Martin/Schneider 🔨	1	1	3	1	0	2	X	X	8
(Saskatchewan) Schwartz/Wills	0	0	0	0	2	0	X	X	2

Sheet C	1	2	3	4	5	6	7	8	Final
(Alberta) (Manitoba) Carey/Hodgson 🔨	2	2	0	2	0	2	1	X	9
(Ontario) Cottrill/Cottrill	0	0	1	0	2	0	0	X	3

Sheet D	1	2	3	4	5	6	7	8	Final
(British Columbia) Cotter/Cotter	0	2	1	0	1	0	X	X	4
(Saskatchewan) Just/Deis 🔨	4	0	0	3	0	4	X	X	11

Sheet E	1	2	3	4	5	6	7	8	Final
(Manitoba) McEwen/McEwen 🔨	5	0	1	4	0	2	X	X	12
(Northern Ontario) Pigeau/Pigeau	0	1	0	0	1	0	X	X	2

Sheet F	1	2	3	4	5	6	7	8	Final
(Manitoba) Jones/Laing	0	4	0	0	0	2	0	X	6
(Alberta) Schiemann/Ginter 🔨	3	0	2	1	2	0	1	X	9

Sheet G	1	2	3	4	5	6	7	8	Final
(Alberta) Virtue/Thomas	3	2	0	1	0	1	0	X	7
(Ontario) Murphy/Murphy 🔨	0	0	1	0	1	0	2	X	4

Sheet H	1	2	3	4	5	6	7	8	Final
(Quebec) Desjardins/Desjardins	0	0	0	0	1	0	X	X	1
(Ontario) Kean/Kean 🔨	2	2	2	1	0	1	X	X	8

=== Draw 7 ===
Thursday, April 6, 8:30 pm

Sheet A	1	2	3	4	5	6	7	8	Final
(Alberta) (Manitoba) Courtney/Carruthers	3	1	0	3	0	0	0	X	7
(Ontario) Stewart/Stewart 🔨	0	0	1	0	1	1	1	X	4

Sheet B	1	2	3	4	5	6	7	8	Final
(Manitoba) (Ontario) Lawes/Fry	0	1	1	0	1	1	0	0	4
(Alberta) Ferguson/Bottcher 🔨	2	0	0	2	0	0	2	2	8

Sheet C	1	2	3	4	5	6	7	8	Final
(Saskatchewan) Quick/Armstrong 🔨	1	0	2	2	0	0	0	0	5
(New Brunswick) Thompson/Sullivan	0	1	0	0	3	1	2	1	8

Sheet D	1	2	3	4	5	6	7	8	Final
(Nova Scotia) Baxter/Dacey	1	0	1	0	2	0	1	0	6
(Yukon) Strong/Scoffin 🔨	0	1	0	1	0	1	0	1	5

Sheet E	1	2	3	4	5	6	7	8	Final
(Ontario) (Alberta) Homan/Morris 🔨	1	2	0	1	0	3	X	X	7
(Ontario) Tuck/Tuck	0	0	1	0	1	0	X	X	2

Sheet F	1	2	3	4	5	6	7	8	Final
(Saskatchewan) Kasner/Kalthoff	1	2	4	0	3	X	X	X	10
(Manitoba) Birchard/Gunnlaugson 🔨	0	0	0	1	0	X	X	X	1

Sheet G	1	2	3	4	5	6	7	8	Final
(British Columbia) Wark/Richard 🔨	2	0	1	1	1	0	0	1	6
(Quebec) Routledge/Asselin	0	2	0	0	0	1	1	0	4

Sheet H	1	2	3	4	5	6	7	8	Final
(Manitoba) (Saskatchewan) Officer/Simmons 🔨	1	0	0	0	2	0	1	1	5
(Prince Edward Island) Smith/Holland	0	2	1	2	0	1	0	0	6

=== Draw 8 ===
Friday, April 7, 8:30 am

Sheet A	1	2	3	4	5	6	7	8	Final
(Manitoba) Jones/Laing	1	0	1	1	1	0	2	2	8
(Alberta) Virtue/Thomas 🔨	0	3	0	0	0	3	0	0	6

Sheet B	1	2	3	4	5	6	7	8	Final
(Quebec) Desjardins/Desjardins 🔨	2	0	0	1	0	2	0	1	7
(Manitoba) McEwen/McEwen	0	2	0	0	1	0	3	0	6

Sheet C	1	2	3	4	5	6	7	8	Final
(Northern Ontario) Pigeau/Pigeau	0	1	0	2	0	2	1	0	6
(Ontario) Kean/Kean 🔨	3	0	2	0	3	0	0	0	8

Sheet D	1	2	3	4	5	6	7	8	Final
(Ontario) Murphy/Murphy 🔨	3	0	1	0	0	1	0	X	5
(Alberta) Schiemann/Ginter	0	1	0	5	1	0	1	X	8

Sheet E	1	2	3	4	5	6	7	8	Final
(Alberta) (Manitoba) Carey/Hodgson 🔨	1	0	2	2	2	0	2	X	9
(Saskatchewan) Martin/Schneider	0	4	0	0	0	1	0	X	5

Sheet F	1	2	3	4	5	6	7	8	Final
(Ontario) Weagle/Epping	0	0	3	0	1	1	0	0	5
(British Columbia) Cotter/Cotter 🔨	3	1	0	2	0	0	1	1	8

Sheet G	1	2	3	4	5	6	7	8	Final
(Newfoundland and Labrador) Lamswood/Lamswood	1	0	0	2	0	2	0	X	5
(Saskatchewan) Just/Deis 🔨	0	2	2	0	4	0	1	X	9

Sheet H	1	2	3	4	5	6	7	8	Final
(Ontario) Cotrill/Cotrill 🔨	1	0	1	0	1	0	2	X	5
(Saskatchewan) Schwartz/Wills	0	3	0	1	0	4	0	X	8

=== Draw 9 ===
Friday, April 7, 11:30 am

Sheet A	1	2	3	4	5	6	7	8	Final
(New Brunswick) Thompson/Sullivan	0	1	0	0	0	0	X	X	1
(Alberta) Ferguson/Bottcher 🔨	2	0	2	1	2	2	X	X	9

Sheet B	1	2	3	4	5	6	7	8	Final
(Ontario) Stewart/Stewart	2	1	1	0	1	2	1	X	8
(Yukon) Strong/Scoffin 🔨	0	0	0	1	0	0	0	X	1

Sheet C	1	2	3	4	5	6	7	8	Final
(Alberta) (Manitoba) Courtney/Carruthers 🔨	1	1	1	1	1	1	X	X	6
(Nova Scotia) Baxter/Dacey	0	0	0	0	0	0	X	X	0

Sheet D	1	2	3	4	5	6	7	8	Final
(Saskatchewan) Quick/Armstrong	2	2	0	4	2	X	X	X	10
(Manitoba) (Ontario) Lawes/Fry 🔨	0	0	3	0	0	X	X	X	3

Sheet E	1	2	3	4	5	6	7	8	Final
(Quebec) Routledge/Asselin	0	1	0	1	0	0	X	X	2
(Manitoba) Birchard/Gunnlaugson 🔨	2	0	2	0	2	2	X	X	8

Sheet F	1	2	3	4	5	6	7	8	Final
(Ontario) Tuck/Tuck 🔨	0	1	0	3	0	1	0	1	6
(Prince Edward Island) Smith/Holland	2	0	1	0	1	0	1	0	5

Sheet G	1	2	3	4	5	6	7	8	Final
(Ontario) (Alberta) Homan/Morris 🔨	1	0	1	2	1	2	2	X	9
(Manitoba) (Saskatchewan) Officer/Simmons	0	2	0	0	0	0	0	X	2

Sheet H	1	2	3	4	5	6	7	8	9	Final
(British Columbia) Wark/Richard 🔨	1	0	0	2	2	0	0	2	1	8
(Saskatchewan) Kasner/Kalthoff	0	1	4	0	0	1	1	0	0	7

=== Draw 10 ===
Friday, April 7, 4:30 pm

Sheet A	1	2	3	4	5	6	7	8	Final
(Northern Ontario) Pigeau/Pigeau	0	2	0	1	0	0	1	X	4
(Quebec) Desjardins/Desjardins 🔨	1	0	2	0	1	2	0	X	6

Sheet B	1	2	3	4	5	6	7	8	Final
(Alberta) Virtue/Thomas	0	2	0	3	1	2	X	X	8
(Alberta) Schmiemann/Ginter 🔨	1	0	1	0	0	0	X	X	2

Sheet C	1	2	3	4	5	6	7	8	Final
(Ontario) Jones/Laing	0	2	0	1	1	0	5	X	9
(Ontario) Murphy/Murphy 🔨	3	0	1	0	0	1	0	X	5

Sheet D	1	2	3	4	5	6	7	8	Final
(Ontario) Kean/Kean	0	2	3	1	0	0	2	2	10
(Manitoba) McEwen/McEwen 🔨	1	0	0	0	3	1	0	0	5

Sheet E	1	2	3	4	5	6	7	8	Final
(Newfoundland and Labrador) Lamswood/Lamswood	0	0	0	0	0	2	X	X	2
(British Columbia) Cotter/Cotter 🔨	3	2	3	1	1	0	X	X	10

Sheet F	1	2	3	4	5	6	7	8	Final
(Alberta) (Manitoba) Carey/Hodgson	1	1	1	0	4	0	5	X	12
(Saskatchewan) Schwartz/Wills 🔨	0	0	0	2	0	1	0	X	3

Sheet G	1	2	3	4	5	6	7	8	Final
(Saskatchewan) Martin/Schneider 🔨	0	3	2	1	2	0	X	X	8
(Ontario) Cottrill/Cottrill	1	0	0	0	0	1	X	X	2

Sheet H	1	2	3	4	5	6	7	8	Final
(Saskatchewan) Just/Deis	0	1	0	2	0	1	0	X	4
(Ontario) Weagle/Epping 🔨	3	0	1	0	1	0	3	X	8

=== Draw 11 ===
Friday, April 7, 7:30 pm

Sheet A	1	2	3	4	5	6	7	8	Final
(Ontario) Stewart/Stewart	0	0	2	2	0	0	1	X	5
(Manitoba) (Ontario) Lawes/Fry 🔨	4	1	0	0	1	1	0	X	7

Sheet B	1	2	3	4	5	6	7	8	9	Final
(Nova Scotia) Baxter/Dacey 🔨	0	3	0	0	1	0	2	0	1	7
(New Brunswick) Thompson/Sullivan	1	0	1	1	0	2	0	1	0	6

Sheet C	1	2	3	4	5	6	7	8	Final
(Yukon) Strong/Scoffin	0	0	0	0	1	0	0	X	1
(Saskatchewan) Quick/Armstrong 🔨	1	2	1	1	0	1	1	X	7

Sheet D	1	2	3	4	5	6	7	8	Final
(Alberta) (Manitoba) Courtney/Carruthers	1	0	1	0	1	1	0	1	5
(Alberta) Ferguson/Bottcher 🔨	0	1	0	1	0	0	1	0	3

Sheet E	1	2	3	4	5	6	7	8	Final
(Ontario) Tuck/Tuck	0	0	0	0	2	0	X	X	2
(Saskatchewan) Kasner/Kalthoff 🔨	3	1	1	1	0	1	X	X	7

Sheet F	1	2	3	4	5	6	7	8	Final
(Manitoba) (Saskatchewan) Officer/Simmons	0	1	0	4	1	0	1	X	7
(Quebec) Routledge/Asselin 🔨	2	0	1	0	0	1	0	X	4

Sheet G	1	2	3	4	5	6	7	8	Final
(Prince Edward Island) Smith/Holland	0	0	1	1	0	0	X	X	2
(British Columbia) Wark/Richard 🔨	2	2	0	0	2	1	X	X	7

Sheet H	1	2	3	4	5	6	7	8	Final
(Alberta) (Ontario) Homan/Morris	0	1	0	4	2	2	1	X	10
(Manitoba) Birchard/Gunnlaugson 🔨	3	0	1	0	0	0	0	X	4

=== Draw 12 ===
Friday, April 7, 10:30 pm

Sheet A	1	2	3	4	5	6	7	8	Final
(Alberta) Virtue/Thomas	2	1	0	5	0	1	X	X	9
(Manitoba) McEwen/McEwen 🔨	0	0	1	0	1	0	X	X	2

Sheet B	1	2	3	4	5	6	7	8	Final
(Ontario) Murphy/Murphy	1	2	1	1	0	4	X	X	9
(Northern Ontario) Pigeau/Pigeau 🔨	0	0	0	0	1	0	X	X	1

Sheet C	1	2	3	4	5	6	7	8	Final
(Alberta) Schmiemann/Ginter	0	4	0	0	2	2	0	0	8
(Ontario) Kean/Kean 🔨	3	0	3	2	0	0	2	0	10

Sheet D	1	2	3	4	5	6	7	8	Final
(Ontario) Jones/Laing 🔨	0	1	3	0	0	0	1	1	6
(Quebec) Desjardins/Desjardins	1	0	0	1	1	1	0	0	4

Sheet E	1	2	3	4	5	6	7	8	Final
(Alberta) (Manitoba) Carey/Hodgson 🔨	0	3	4	0	0	1	0	1	9
(Ontario) Weagle/Epping	2	0	0	2	1	0	2	0	7

Sheet F	1	2	3	4	5	6	7	8	Final
(Ontario) Cottrill/Cottrill 🔨	0	4	0	1	0	0	1	0	6
(Newfoundland and Labrador) Lamswood/Lamswood	1	0	1	0	4	2	0	0	8

Sheet G	1	2	3	4	5	6	7	8	Final
(Saskatchewan) Schwartz/Wills	0	0	0	0	1	1	X	X	2
(Saskatchewan) Just/Deis 🔨	4	2	1	1	0	0	X	X	8

Sheet H	1	2	3	4	5	6	7	8	Final
(Saskatchewan) Martin/Schneider 🔨	0	0	3	0	0	0	3	0	6
(British Columbia) Cotter/Cotter	1	1	0	2	1	1	0	3	9

=== Draw 13 ===
Saturday, April 8, 10:30 am

Sheet A	1	2	3	4	5	6	7	8	Final
(Manitoba) (Saskatchewan) Officer/Simmons	0	0	2	1	0	2	4	X	9
(British Columbia) Wark/Richard 🔨	1	1	0	0	3	0	0	X	5

Sheet B	1	2	3	4	5	6	7	8	Final
(Ontario) Tuck/Tuck	1	0	0	0	0	0	X	X	1
(Manitoba) Birchard/Gunnlaugson 🔨	0	1	2	1	1	1	X	X	6

Sheet C	1	2	3	4	5	6	7	8	Final
(Ontario) (Alberta) Homan/Morris 🔨	0	2	0	1	1	1	0	X	5
(Saskatchewan) Kasner/Kalthoff	1	0	1	0	0	0	1	X	3

Sheet D	1	2	3	4	5	6	7	8	Final
(Prince Edward Island) Smith/Holland	0	1	0	1	0	1	1	0	4
(Quebec) Routledge/Asselin 🔨	3	0	1	0	1	0	0	1	6

Sheet E	1	2	3	4	5	6	7	8	Final
(Nova Scotia) Baxter/Dacey 🔨	0	1	3	0	0	3	0	2	9
(Saskatchewan) Quick/Armstrong	3	0	0	1	1	0	3	0	8

Sheet F	1	2	3	4	5	6	7	8	Final
(Ontario) Stewart/Stewart	0	0	0	0	3	0	1	X	4
(Alberta) Ferguson/Bottcher 🔨	1	1	1	1	0	2	0	X	6

Sheet G	1	2	3	4	5	6	7	8	Final
(Alberta) (Manitoba) Courtney/Carruthers	2	1	0	3	2	X	X	X	8
(Manitoba) (Ontario) Lawes/Fry	0	0	1	0	0	X	X	X	1

Sheet H	1	2	3	4	5	6	7	8	Final
(Yukon) Strong/Scoffin	0	0	2	0	0	0	X	X	2
(New Brunswick) Thompson/Sullivan 🔨	2	1	0	4	1	2	X	X	10

=== Draw 14 ===
Saturday, April 8, 1:30 pm

Sheet A	1	2	3	4	5	6	7	8	Final
(Ontario) Cottrill/Cottrill	1	1	0	0	1	3	0	0	6
(Saskatchewan) Just/Deis 🔨	0	0	2	1	0	0	3	1	7

Sheet B	1	2	3	4	5	6	7	8	Final
(Alberta) (Manitoba) Carey/Hodgson	0	1	0	1	0	3	0	3	8
(British Columbia) Cotter/Cotter 🔨	2	0	1	0	2	0	2	0	7

Sheet C	1	2	3	4	5	6	7	8	9	Final
(Saskatchewan) Martin/Schneider 🔨	3	0	0	1	0	2	0	1	0	7
(Ontario) Weagle/Epping	0	2	1	0	1	0	3	0	1	8

Sheet D	1	2	3	4	5	6	7	8	Final
(Saskatchewan) Schwartz/Wills	1	1	1	0	1	1	0	2	7
(Newfoundland and Labrador) Lamswood/Lamswood 🔨	0	0	0	3	0	0	3	0	6

Sheet E	1	2	3	4	5	6	7	8	Final
(Ontario) Murphy/Murphy 🔨	0	2	1	2	2	0	1	X	8
(Ontario) Kean/Kean	1	0	0	0	0	2	0	X	3

Sheet F	1	2	3	4	5	6	7	8	Final
(Alberta) Virtue/Thomas 🔨	0	2	2	0	0	2	0	3	9
(Quebec) Desjardins/Desjardins	1	0	0	4	1	0	1	0	7

Sheet G	1	2	3	4	5	6	7	8	9	Final
(Ontario) Jones/Laing	0	1	1	0	2	0	3	0	1	8
(Manitoba) McEwen/McEwen 🔨	2	0	0	3	0	1	0	1	0	7

Sheet H	1	2	3	4	5	6	7	8	Final
(Alberta) Schmiemann/Ginter 🔨	2	0	0	6	0	2	X	X	10
(Northern Ontario) Pigeau/Pigeau	0	1	1	0	1	0	X	X	3

=== Tiebreakers ===
Saturday, April 8, 4:00 pm

Sheet E	1	2	3	4	5	6	7	8	Final
(British Columbia) Cotter/Cotter	0	0	1	2	0	0	X	X	3
(Ontario) Tuck/Tuck 🔨	1	1	0	0	2	1	X	X	5

Sheet F	1	2	3	4	5	6	7	8	Final
(Ontario) Kean/Kean 🔨	0	2	0	0	3	0	1	X	6
(New Brunswick) Thompson/Sullivan	1	0	2	1	0	1	0	X	5

Saturday, April 8, 6:00 pm

Sheet E	1	2	3	4	5	6	7	8	Final
(Ontario) Murphy/Murphy 🔨	1	1	0	1	0	5	X	X	8
(Ontario) Kean/Kean	0	0	1	0	5	0	X	X	6

Sheet F	1	2	3	4	5	6	7	8	Final
(Alberta) Schmiemann/Ginter 🔨	1	1	0	0	0	1	0	X	3
(Ontario) Tuck/Tuck	0	0	1	1	1	0	1	X	4

Saturday, April 8, 8:00 pm

Sheet F	1	2	3	4	5	6	7	8	Final
(Ontario) Tuck/Tuck 🔨	0	2	0	1	3	0	0	X	6
(Ontario) Murphy/Murphy	1	0	1	0	0	4	1	X	7

== Playoffs ==
Round of 12
(Saskatchewan) Kasner / Kalthoff	7
(Manitoba) Birchard / Gunnlaugson	5
(Alberta) Virtue / Thomas	4
(Ontario) Murphy / Murphy	7
(Alberta) (Manitoba) Carey / Hodgson	6
(Nova Scotia) Baxter / Dacey	5
(Ontario) Weagle / Epping	3
(Alberta) Ferguson / Bottcher	7

Quarterfinals
(Saskatchewan) Kasner / Kalthoff	6
(Ontario) (Alberta) Homan / Morris	8
(Ontario) Murphy / Murphy	4
(Ontario) Jones / Laing	9
(Alberta) (Manitoba) Carey / Hodgson	6
(Saskatchewan) Just / Deis	4
(Alberta) Ferguson / Bottcher	4
(Alberta) (Manitoba) Courtney / Carruthers	7

Semifinals
(Ontario) (Alberta) Homan / Morris	8
(Manitoba) Jones / Laing	4
(Alberta) (Manitoba) Carey / Hodgson	4
(Alberta) (Manitoba) Courtney / Carruthers	6

Final
(Ontario) (Alberta) Homan / Morris	6
(Alberta) (Manitoba) Courtney / Carruthers	9

=== Round of 12 ===
Saturday, April 8, 9:00 pm

Team	1	2	3	4	5	6	7	8	Final
(Saskatchewan) Kasner/Kalthoff 🔨	0	0	2	0	3	0	0	2	7
(Manitoba) Birchard/Gunnlaugson	1	1	0	1	0	1	1	0	5

Team	1	2	3	4	5	6	7	8	Final
(Alberta) Virtue/Thomas 🔨	0	0	0	3	0	0	1	X	4
(Ontario) Murphy/Murphy	1	2	2	0	1	1	0	X	7

Team	1	2	3	4	5	6	7	8	Final
(Alberta) (Manitoba) Carey/Hodgson 🔨	1	0	2	0	0	2	1	0	6
(Nova Scotia) Baxter/Dacey	0	1	0	2	1	0	0	1	5

Team	1	2	3	4	5	6	7	8	Final
(Ontario) Weagle/Epping	0	1	0	1	1	0	0	X	3
(Alberta) Ferguson/Bottcher 🔨	1	0	2	0	0	2	2	X	7

=== Quarterfinals ===
Sunday, April 9, 10:00 am

Team	1	2	3	4	5	6	7	8	Final
(Saskatchewan) Kasner/Kalthoff	0	0	1	1	0	3	1	0	6
(Ontario) (Alberta) Homan/Morris 🔨	3	2	0	0	2	0	0	1	8

Team	1	2	3	4	5	6	7	8	Final
(Ontario) Murphy/Murphy	0	2	0	0	0	2	0	X	4
(Ontario) Jones/Laing 🔨	2	0	1	1	2	0	3	X	9

Team	1	2	3	4	5	6	7	8	Final
(Alberta) (Manitoba) Carey/Hodgson 🔨	1	0	0	2	1	1	0	1	6
(Saskatchewan) Just/Deis	0	1	1	0	0	0	2	0	4

Team	1	2	3	4	5	6	7	8	Final
(Alberta) Ferguson/Bottcher	0	1	0	0	0	2	1	0	4
(Alberta) (Manitoba) Courtney/Carruthers 🔨	1	0	1	1	3	0	0	1	7

=== Semifinals ===
Sunday, April 9, 2:00 pm

Team	1	2	3	4	5	6	7	8	Final
(Ontario) (Alberta) Homan/Morris 🔨	2	1	0	2	0	1	2	X	8
(Ontario) Jones/Laing	0	0	3	0	1	0	0	X	4

Team	1	2	3	4	5	6	7	8	Final
(Alberta) (Manitoba) Carey/Hodgson	1	0	0	0	0	2	0	1	4
(Alberta) (Manitoba) Courtney/Carruthers 🔨	0	1	1	1	1	0	2	0	6

=== Final ===
Sunday, April 9, 5:00 pm

Sheet C	1	2	3	4	5	6	7	8	9	Final
(Ontario) (Alberta) Homan/Morris	0	1	0	1	0	3	0	1	0	6
(Alberta) (Manitoba) Courtney/Carruthers 🔨	1	0	2	0	1	0	2	0	3	9
