= 2018 Continental Cup of Curling =

2018 World Financial Group Continental Cup of Curling
- Host city: London, Ontario
- Arena: The Sports Centre at Western Fair District
- Dates: January 11–14
- Winner: Team North America
Score Breakdown
Discipline	NA	World
Team Round 1	1	2
Mixed Doubles Round 1	1	2
Team Round 2	2	1
Team Round 3	2	1
Mixed Doubles Round 2	3	0
Team Round 4	1.5	1.5
Mixed Doubles Round 3	2	4
Team Round 5	1.5	1.5
Team Round 6	1.5	1.5
Skins Round 1	8	7
Skins Round 2	6.5	8.5
Tiebreak	0.5	0
Total	30.5	30

The 2018 World Financial Group Continental Cup of Curling was held from January 11 to 14 at the Sports Centre at Western Fair District in London, Ontario. The Continental Cup featured team events, mixed doubles events, and skins competitions, and the brunt of the points was in the skins competitions. TSN broadcast the event, as it has in previous years.

North America won the event 30.5 points to 30, with an extra half point awarded in a draw to the button competition between Brad Gushue and Thomas Ulsrud after a 30–30 tie after all events. North America collected CAD$52,000 winner's cheque. World collected $26,000 loser's cheque and $13,000 Sunday skins bonus.

The total attendance for the event was 16,017.

== Competition format ==
This edition of the Continental Cup used a similar format as that of the previous year. Out of the sixty total points available, a majority of points were needed to win the cup. The mixed doubles, and team games were worth one point each, and ties were worth one half point each to both teams. The skins games were worth a total of five points. Nine mixed doubles were played, along with eighteen team games and six skins games.

== Teams ==
The teams were selected from the top teams in each region. Six teams from each region competed against each other in the competition. Four teams from Canada earned the right to represent Team North America by virtue of winning certain events, namely the 2017 Canadian Olympic Curling Trials (which were held in lieu of a Canada Cup of Curling in 2017) and the Canadian National Championships (the Brier and the Tournament of Hearts). Two teams from the United States, namely the top point-getters of American teams on the World Curling Tour, were chosen to represent North America, and the teams representing Team World were selected by the World Curling Federation.

The teams in the table below have been announced as representatives of their respective regions. As Rachel Homan had won both the 2017 Scotties and the 2017 Olympic Trials, Michelle Englot and her team was invited as 2017 Scotties runners-up.

Team	Skip	Third	Second	Lead	Locale
Team; North; America	Brad Gushue	Mark Nichols	Brett Gallant	Geoff Walker	(Canada) St. John's, Newfoundland and Labrador
Team; North; America	John Shuster	Tyler George	Matt Hamilton	John Landsteiner	(United States) Duluth, Minnesota
Team; North; America	Kevin Koe	Marc Kennedy	Brent Laing	Ben Hebert	(Canada) Calgary, Alberta
Team; North; America	Rachel Homan	Emma Miskew	Joanne Courtney	Lisa Weagle	(Canada) Ottawa, Ontario
Team; North; America	Nina Roth	Tabitha Peterson	Aileen Geving	Becca Hamilton	(United States) Madison, Wisconsin
Team; North; America	Michelle Englot	Kate Cameron	Leslie Wilson-Westcott	Raunora Westcott	(Canada) Winnipeg, Manitoba
Team; North; America	Coach: (Canada) Rick Lang, Captain: (Canada) Al Hackner				
Team; World	Niklas Edin	Oskar Eriksson	Rasmus Wranå	Christoffer Sundgren	Karlstad, Sweden
Team; World	Benoît Schwarz	Claudio Pätz	Peter de Cruz (skip)	Valentin Tanner	Geneva, Switzerland
Team; World	Thomas Ulsrud	Torger Nergård	Christoffer Svae	Håvard Vad Petersson	Oslo, Norway
Team; World	Satsuki Fujisawa	Yumi Suzuki	Chinami Yoshida	Yurika Yoshida	Kitami, Japan
Team; World	Anna Hasselborg	Sara McManus	Agnes Knochenhauer	Sofia Mabergs	Sundbyberg, Sweden
Team; World	Silvana Tirinzoni	Manuela Siegrist	Esther Neuenschwander	Marlene Albrecht	Zürich, Switzerland
Team; World	Coach: (Sweden) Fredrik Lindberg, Captain: (Scotland) David Murdoch				

== Events ==
All times listed are in Eastern Standard Time (UTC−5).

=== Thursday, January 11 ===
==== Draw 1 ====
Team 9:30 am

Sheet A	1	2	3	4	5	6	7	8	Final	Points
North America (Homan)	0	0	1	0	0	2	0	X	3	0
World (Tirinzoni)	3	2	0	2	1	0	1	X	9	1

Sheet B	1	2	3	4	5	6	7	8	Final	Points
North America (Shuster)	0	1	0	4	0	3	1	X	9	1
World (Edin)	1	0	1	0	3	0	0	X	5	0

Sheet C	1	2	3	4	5	6	7	8	Final	Points
North America (Englot)	0	0	1	0	1	0	1	0	3	0
World (Hasselborg)	3	0	0	1	0	1	0	1	6	1

==== Draw 2 ====
Mixed doubles 2:30 pm

Sheet A	1	2	3	4	5	6	7	8	Final	Points
North America (Homan/Gallant)	0	0	1	0	0	3	1	0	5	0
World (Neuenschwander/Pätz)	2	3	0	1	1	0	0	1	8	1

Sheet B	1	2	3	4	5	6	7	8	Final	Points
North America (R. Hamilton/M. Hamilton)	1	1	0	0	1	1	0	X	4	0
World (Mabergs/Edin)	0	0	3	2	0	0	2	X	7	1

Sheet C	1	2	3	4	5	6	7	8	Final	Points
North America (Weagle/Gushue)	2	0	1	0	2	0	1	1	7	1
World (Eriksson/Hasselborg)	0	1	0	1	0	1	0	0	3	0

==== Draw 3 ====
Team 7:00 pm

Sheet A	1	2	3	4	5	6	7	8	Final	Points
North America (Koe)	2	0	0	1	0	2	0	1	6	1
World (Ulsrud)	0	2	0	0	0	0	2	0	4	0

Sheet B	1	2	3	4	5	6	7	8	Final	Points
North America (Roth)	2	0	0	2	0	1	0	0	5	0
World (Fujisawa)	0	2	1	0	2	0	1	1	7	1

Sheet C	1	2	3	4	5	6	7	8	Final	Points
North America (Gushue)	0	1	2	0	3	0	1	X	7	1
World (de Cruz)	0	0	0	1	0	1	0	X	2	0

=== Friday, January 12 ===
==== Draw 4 ====
Team 9:30 am

Sheet A	1	2	3	4	5	6	7	8	Final	Points
North America (Englot)	0	0	1	0	1	0	1	X	3	0
World (Fujisawa)	1	2	0	1	0	1	0	X	5	1

Sheet B	1	2	3	4	5	6	7	8	Final	Points
North America (Koe)	0	4	0	1	2	0	1	X	8	1
World (de Cruz)	1	0	1	0	0	2	0	X	4	0

Sheet C	1	2	3	4	5	6	7	8	Final	Points
North America (Roth)	1	0	0	1	0	2	0	1	5	1
World (Tirinzoni)	0	0	1	0	1	0	2	0	4	0

==== Draw 5 ====
Mixed doubles 2:30 pm

Sheet A	1	2	3	4	5	6	7	8	Final	Points
North America (Cameron/Kennedy)	0	1	1	2	2	0	0	2	8	1
World (Fujisawa/Svae)	3	0	0	0	0	1	1	0	5	0

Sheet B	1	2	3	4	5	6	7	8	Final	Points
North America (Miskew/Hebert)	2	1	0	3	0	0	0	X	6	1
World (McManus/Sundgren)	0	0	1	0	1	1	1	X	4	0

Sheet C	1	2	3	4	5	6	7	8	Final	Points
North America (Courtney/Shuster)	2	1	0	2	0	0	2	X	7	1
World (Tirinzoni/Tanner)	0	0	1	0	1	1	0	X	3	0

==== Draw 6 ====
Team 7:00 pm

Sheet A	1	2	3	4	5	6	7	8	Final	Points
North America (Gushue)	0	1	0	1	0	0	1	0	3	0
World (Edin)	2	0	0	0	2	0	0	1	5	1

Sheet B	1	2	3	4	5	6	7	8	Final	Points
North America (Homan)	0	2	0	1	1	0	2	0	6	0.5
World (Hasselborg)	0	0	2	0	0	2	0	2	6	0.5

Sheet C	1	2	3	4	5	6	7	8	Final	Points
North America (Shuster)	2	1	1	1	0	1	2	X	8	1
World (Ulsrud)	0	0	0	0	3	0	0	X	3	0

=== Saturday, January 13 ===
==== Draw 7 ====
Mixed doubles 9:30 am

Sheet A	1	2	3	4	5	6	7	8	Final	Points
North America (Englot/Laing & Wilson-Westcott/Nichols)	1	0	0	2	0	1	0	1	5	0
World (Albrecht/de Cruz & Siegrist/Schwarz)	0	1	3	0	1	0	2	0	7	2

Sheet B	1	2	3	4	5	6	7	8	Final	Points
North America (Peterson/George & Roth/Landsteiner)	0	2	0	3	0	1	0	X	6	0
World (Knochenhauer/Wranå & Suzuki/Nergård)	1	0	2	0	3	0	3	X	9	2

Sheet C	1	2	3	4	5	6	7	8	Final	Points
North America (Geving/Walker & Westcott/Koe)	0	4	1	0	1	1	1	X	8	2
World (Y. Yoshida/Ulsrud & C. Yoshida/Petersson)	1	0	0	2	0	0	0	X	3	0

==== Draw 8 ====
Team 2:30 pm

Sheet A	1	2	3	4	5	6	7	8	Final	Points
North America (Roth)	0	0	2	1	0	1	0	1	5	0.5
World (Hasselborg)	0	1	0	0	2	0	2	0	5	0.5

Sheet B	1	2	3	4	5	6	7	8	Final	Points
North America (Gushue)	2	1	2	0	1	0	1	X	7	1
World (Ulsrud)	0	0	0	1	0	1	0	X	2	0

Sheet C	1	2	3	4	5	6	7	8	Final	Points
North America (Homan)	0	1	0	0	1	0	0	X	2	0
World (Fujisawa)	0	0	2	1	0	3	1	X	7	1

==== Draw 9 ====
Team 7:00 pm

Sheet A	1	2	3	4	5	6	7	8	Final	Points
North America (Shuster)	0	2	0	2	0	0	3	0	7	0.5
World (de Cruz)	2	0	2	0	0	1	0	2	7	0.5

Sheet B	1	2	3	4	5	6	7	8	Final	Points
North America (Englot)	0	0	0	2	0	2	0	X	4	0
World (Tirinzoni)	5	0	2	0	1	0	1	X	9	1

Sheet C	1	2	3	4	5	6	7	8	Final	Points
North America (Koe)	0	0	4	0	2	2	0	1	9	1
World (Edin)	0	2	0	3	0	0	1	0	6	0

=== Sunday, January 14 ===
==== Draw 10 ====
Skins 2:30 pm

Values (points)	½	½	½	½	½	½	1	1	5
Sheet A	1	2	3	4	5	6	7	8	Total
North America (Roth)			X		X		X		2
World (Fujisawa)	X	X		X		X		X	3

Values (points)	½	½	½	½	½	½	1	1	5
Sheet B	1	2	3	4	5	6	7	8	Total
North America (Kennedy/Cameron/Hebert/Wilson)	X			X		0		X	2
World (Eriksson/Hasselborg/Sundgren/Mabergs)		0	X		X		X		3

Values (points)	½	½	½	½	½	½	1	1	5
Sheet C	1	2	3	4	5	6	7	8	Total
North America (Shuster)		X		X			X	X	4
World (de Cruz)	0		0		0	X			1

==== Draw 11 ====
Skins 7:00 pm

Values (points)	½	½	½	½	½	½	1	1		5
Sheet A	1	2	3	4	5	6	7	8	Button	Total
North America (Homan)		X		0	0	X		0		2
World (Tirinzoni)	X		X				X		X	3

Values (points)	½	½	½	½	½	½	1	1		5
Sheet B	1	2	3	4	5	6	7	8	Button	Total
North America (Koe/Englot/Laing/Westcott)	X		X			X	X			2.5
World (Edin/McManus/Wranå/Knochenhauer)		X		X	X			0	X	2.5

Values (points)	½	½	½	½	½	½	1	1	5
Team	1	2	3	4	5	6	7	8	Total
North America (Gushue)	0	0	0	X					2
World (Ulsrud)					0	0	X	X	3

==== Tiebreaker ====
After all events, Team North America and Team World were tied at 30 points each. The tiebreak was a draw to the button with each team selecting a thrower. Brad Gushue for Team North America won the draw over Thomas Ulsrud for Team World.
