= Rachel Homan =

Canadian curler (born 1989)

- Curler
- Other names: Rachel Germain
- Born: Rachel Catherine Homan; April 5, 1989 (age 37); Ottawa, Ontario, Canada
- Height: 168 cm (5 ft 6 in)

Team
- Curling club: Ottawa CC, Ottawa, ON; Sherwood Park CC, Sherwood Park, AB
- Skip: Rachel Homan
- Third: Tracy Fleury
- Second: Emma Miskew
- Lead: Sarah Wilkes
- Alternate: Rachelle Brown
- Mixed doubles partner: Brendan Bottcher

Curling career
- Member Association: Ontario
- Hearts: 11 (2011, 2013, 2014, 2015, 2017, 2019, 2020, 2021, 2023, 2024, 2025)
- World Championship: 5 (2013, 2014, 2017, 2024, 2025)
- Pan Continental Championship: 2 (2024, 2025)
- Olympic: 3 (2018, 2022, 2026)
- Top CTRS ranking: 1st (2012–13, 2015–16, 2016–17, 2018–19, 2023–24, 2024–25, 2025–26)
- Grand Slam victories: 20 (2012 Masters, 2013 Masters, 2015 Masters, 2015 National, 2015 Canadian Open, 2017 Champions Cup, 2018 Champions Cup, 2018 Tour Challenge, 2018 National, 2019 Canadian Open, 2021 Champions Cup, 2022 Tour Challenge, 2023 Champions Cup, 2023 Masters, 2024 Canadian Open (Jan.), 2024 Canadian Open (Nov.), 2024 National, 2025 Masters (Sept.), 2025 Tour Challenge, 2025 GSOC Tahoe)
Medal record
Women's curling
Representing Canada
Olympic Games
Bronze medal – third place	2026 Milano Cortina	Team
World Curling Championships
Gold medal – first place	2017 Beijing
Gold medal – first place	2024 Sydney
Gold medal – first place	2025 Uijeongbu
Silver medal – second place	2014 Saint John
Bronze medal – third place	2013 Riga
World Junior Curling Championships
Silver medal – second place	2010 Flims
Pan Continental Curling Championships
Gold medal – first place	2024 Lacombe
Silver medal – second place	2025 Virginia
Scotties Tournament of Hearts
Gold medal – first place	2014 Montreal
Gold medal – first place	2025 Thunder Bay
Bronze medal – third place	2015 Moose Jaw
Representing Ontario
Canadian Olympic Curling Trials
Gold medal – first place	2017 Ottawa
Gold medal – first place	2025 Halifax
Bronze medal – third place	2013 Winnipeg
Scotties Tournament of Hearts
Gold medal – first place	2013 Kingston
Gold medal – first place	2017 St Catharines
Gold medal – first place	2024 Calgary
Silver medal – second place	2019 Sydney
Silver medal – second place	2020 Moose Jaw
Silver medal – second place	2021 Calgary
Canadian Mixed Doubles Championship
Silver medal – second place	2017 Saskatoon
Canada Winter Games
Gold medal – first place	2007 Whitehorse
Representing Alberta
Canadian Mixed Doubles Olympic Trials
Silver medal – second place	2025 Liverpool
Canadian Mixed Doubles Championship
Bronze medal – third place	2023 Sudbury
Bronze medal – third place	2026 Surrey

Rachel Catherine Homan (born April 5, 1989) is a Canadian curler. Homan is a former Canadian junior champion, a five-time Canadian national champion, and three-time World Champion, all as a skip. She was the skip of the Canadian women's curling team at the 2018 and 2026 Winter Olympics. The team won the bronze medal in 2026 edition of the event. She also competed in the mixed doubles event at the 2022 Winter Olympics.

During her junior career, Homan competed in two Canadian Junior Curling Championships, placing second in 2009 and winning the championship in 2010. She also won a silver medal at the 2010 World Junior Curling Championships. Throughout her women's career, Homan has medalled at the Scotties Tournament of Hearts, the Canadian women's national curling championships, nine times, winning gold five times (2013, 2014, 2017, 2024, and 2025), silver three times (2019, 2020, and 2021), and bronze once (2015). She has competed in five World Women's Curling Championships, winning gold three times (2017, 2024, and 2025), silver in 2014, and bronze in 2013. She has also competed in three Canadian Olympic Curling Trials, finishing in third place in 2013, winning in 2017, finishing last in 2021, and winning again in 2025. At the 2018 Winter Olympics, her team finished in sixth place. In 2019, Homan was named the fourth-greatest Canadian female curler in history by The Sports Network (TSN).

== Career ==
=== Bantam and junior (2003–2010) ===
Homan began curling at the age of five, playing in the Little Rock program at the Rideau Curling Club in Ottawa. While bantam-aged (under 16), she won four straight provincial championships from 2003 to 2006, while no other curler had won even twice. In 2006, she won the Optimist International Under-18 Curling Tournament, beating Casey Scheidegger in the final. Her team qualified for the 2007 Canada Winter Games in Whitehorse, Yukon, where Homan skipped Team Ontario to a gold medal.

During her first two years at the junior level, Homan did not win a provincial championship. In 2007, her team lost the provincial semifinal to Hollie Nicol's rink. In 2008, her team lost in the final to Danielle Inglis. These losses were allayed by a provincial junior championship in 2009, earning her team a berth at the 2009 Canadian Junior Curling Championships. At the Canadian Juniors, she skipped the Ontario team to a 10–2 record after the round robin, giving her rink a bye to the final, where she lost to the defending champion, Kaitlyn Lawes from Manitoba. Homan won the 2010 provincial championship and represented Ontario at the 2010 Canadian Junior Curling Championships. At the 2010 Canadian Junior Curling Championships, Homan, with Emma Miskew, Laura Crocker, and Lynn Kreviazuk, won the junior national title with an undefeated record of 13 wins and 0 losses – only the fourth women's team to do so. The team represented Canada at the 2010 World Junior Curling Championships in Flims, Switzerland. The team lost just one round robin game and lost in the final to Sweden's team, skipped by Anna Hasselborg.

Prior to graduating from juniors in 2010, Homan's junior team was too young to participate in Scotties Tournament of Hearts playdowns (as juniors were ineligible to enter provincial playdowns until 2016), but this did not stop her from participating in Women's World Curling Tour events. Homan's top accomplishments on the tour while she was junior-aged included winning two straight Southwestern Ontario Women's Charity Cashspiels. In 2007, she defeated then-World Champion Jennifer Jones in the semifinal and Ève Bélisle in the final, and in 2008 she won in the final against the Chinese national team, skipped by Wang Bingyu. Her team earned $11,000 for each win. In 2009, she won the AMJ Campbell Shorty Jenkins Classic, winning $5,500 for her team. Later that year, her team participated in the Canadian Olympic Curling Pre-Trials, where her team finished with a 3–3 record, and therefore did not qualify for the "Roar of the Rings", Canada's Olympic Trials.

In 2009, Homan's rink was named the World Curling Tour's "rookie team of the year."

=== Early women's (2010–2012) ===
In her first year of eligibility, Homan qualified for and won the 2011 Ontario Scotties Tournament of Hearts. At the 2011 Scotties Tournament of Hearts, Homan skipped the Ontario team, finishing the round robin in third place and beating Nova Scotia's Heather Smith-Dacey in the 3 vs. 4 game, before losing in the semi-final to Saskatchewan's Amber Holland, thus eliminating her from the final. She then lost in the bronze medal game to Smith-Dacey.

In April 2011, Homan played third for her brother Mark, and won the 2012 Ontario Mixed Championship. The team, which also included Brian Fleischhaker and teammate in women's play Alison Kreviazuk, represented Ontario at the 2012 Canadian Mixed Curling Championship in November 2011. The team finished with an 8–5 record and out of the playoffs.

That same month, Homan's women's team made it to her first career Grand Slam final, when she lost to Jennifer Jones in the final of the 2011 Players' Championship. Later in 2011, she played in her first Canada Cup where her team finished with a 2–4 record.

Homan once again qualified for the provincial Scotties Tournament of Hearts in 2012. Her team went undefeated throughout the round robin. However, they lost in the final to Tracy Horgan's rink from Sudbury. Homan, who was up by one point with the hammer, missed a draw to the button to clinch the victory on her final rock. Instead, she gave up three points and lost.

=== Scotties champions and world bronze medallists (2012–13) ===
In her first Grand Slam event of the 2012–13 curling season, the 2012 Curlers Corner Autumn Gold Curling Classic, Homan's team lost to Sherry Middaugh in the final. In the second Grand Slam event of the season, the 2012 Manitoba Lotteries Women's Curling Classic, Homan's rink once again lost in the final, this time to Stefanie Lawton. Homan lost in the semi-final of the third Slam of the season, the 2012 Colonial Square Ladies Classic, but followed it up with her first-ever Grand Slam victory at the 2012 Masters of Curling, where she beat Chelsea Carey in the final. Outside of the Grand Slams, Homan won her 2nd Royal LePage OVCA Women's Fall Classic in 2012.

Later in the season, Homan qualified for her second Scotties Tournament of Hearts by going undefeated at the 2013 Ontario Scotties Tournament of Hearts. Homan began the 2013 Scotties Tournament of Hearts in Kingston, Ontario, by winning the Ford Hot Shots skills competition. At the Scotties, the team lost just one game in the round robin, to Manitoba's Jennifer Jones. This gave the rink a 10–1 record, second behind Manitoba, who went undefeated. However, in their first playoff game, the Homan rink defeated Jones 8–5. This put the Homan team in the final, where they faced Jones once again, and won 9–6. With the victory, the Homan rink became the first Ottawa-based team to win the Canadian women's curling championship. The win earned Homan and her team the right to represent Canada at the 2013 World Women's Curling Championship in Riga, Latvia.

At the World championships, the Homan rink led Canada to an 8–3 round robin finish, which put them in third place. In the playoffs, they beat the United States (skipped by Erika Brown) in the 3 vs. 4 game, then lost to Scotland (skipped by Eve Muirhead) in the semi-final, after Homan missed her last shot of the game, jamming a double takeout. After the loss, Homan defeated the Americans again, this time in the bronze medal game. The Homan rink finished the season by losing in the quarter-final of the 2013 Players' Championship.

=== Scotties repeat champions and world silver medallists (2013–14) ===
Starting the 2013–14 curling season, Homan's team played in four events on the World Curling Tour before winning the 2013 Masters, beating Eve Muirhead in the final. They had previously beaten Homan in the semi-finals of the 2013 Curlers Corner Autumn Gold Curling Classic. Homan's team had made the playoffs in every Grand Slam event in the previous season; however, they failed to make the playoffs at the 2013 Colonial Square Ladies Classic.

Homan's success over the previous three seasons qualified her team for an automatic entry at the 2013 Canadian Olympic Curling Trials. There, the team qualified for playoffs with a 4–3 round robin record, in second place. They lost to Sherry Middaugh in the semi-final, ending the team's 2014 Olympic hopes.

As defending Scotties champions from 2013, the Homan rink represented Team Canada at the 2014 Scotties Tournament of Hearts in Montreal. The event was notable for the absence of Jennifer Jones, who was competing at the Olympics. The Homan team went through the entire tournament undefeated without ever having to throw their last rock and defeated Alberta's Val Sweeting in the final. Homan became the youngest skip ever to win back-to-back Scotties. Homan was awarded the Sandra Schmirler Most Valuable Player Award, and ended the event with a 90% shooting percentage based on overall shot successes throughout the event, the highest of any skip in the tournament.

Homan's 2014 Scotties win earned her team a berth at the 2014 World Women's Curling Championship in Saint John, New Brunswick. The team had a better event than the previous year, as they only lost one round robin game to finish first place heading into the playoffs. The team defeated Switzerland's Binia Feltscher in the 1 vs. 2 page playoff game, but lost in a rematch in the final. Homan and her Canadian team thus settled for a silver medal.

The Homan rink ended the season with a loss in the final of the 2014 Players' Championship against the Olympic gold medallist Jennifer Jones. The match marked the last game on the team for second Alison Kreviazuk, as she moved to Sweden to be with her boyfriend Fredrik Lindberg, who played for Niklas Edin. Kreviazuk, who had played for Homan since they were bantam-aged, was replaced by Joanne Courtney from Edmonton.

=== Joanne Courtney joins the team (2014–2017) ===
==== 2014–15 ====
The Homan rink found less success in the 2014–15 curling season after adding new second Joanne Courtney to the team. The team did not win any Slam events, losing in the finals of the 2014 Curlers Corner Autumn Gold Curling Classic (against Jennifer Jones) and the 2014 Canadian Open of Curling (against Eve Muirhead). The team also lost in the final of the 2014 Canada Cup of Curling against Val Sweeting. As defending champions, the team represented Team Canada at the 2015 Scotties Tournament of Hearts. The team finished the round robin in 4th place with a 7–4 record. In the playoffs, they lost to Saskatchewan's Stefanie Lawton in the 3 vs. 4 game, but rebounded in the bronze medal game in a re-match against the Lawton rink, beating them 7–5. That season, the team won one World Curling Tour event, the Pomeroy Inn & Suites Prairie Showdown held in March. The team also won the inaugural 2015 Pinty's All-Star Curling Skins Game, earning them $52,000.

==== 2015–16 ====
The team found more success at the start of the 2015–16 curling season. They began the season with a win in the Stu Sells Oakville Tankard, followed by a loss in the final of the first Slam, the 2015 GSOC Tour Challenge, against Switzerland's Silvana Tirinzoni. The team then won six World Curling Tour events in a row, the Stockholm Ladies Cup, the Curlers Corner Autumn Gold Curling Classic, the 2015 Masters of Curling, the 2015 National, the 2015 Canada Cup of Curling and the 2015 Canadian Open of Curling, amassing a huge lead in both the World Curling Tour Order of Merit and Money standings in the process. After this impressive run, they were upset in the finals of the 2016 Ontario Scotties Tournament of Hearts against their club mates, the Jenn Hanna team, meaning the World number one-ranked Homan team would not be able to play in the national championships that year. The team was invited to play in the 2016 Elite 10 men's Grand Slam event, making history as the first women's team to compete in a men's Grand Slam event. The team won one game in the event against Charley Thomas. The team ended the season losing against Jennifer Jones in the final of the 2016 Humpty's Champions Cup. The Homan rink's success over the course of the season meant the team finished the season ranked first in the world in both the women's money list and order of merit standings.

==== 2016–17 ====
Homan's team began the 2016–17 season by winning their first event, the 2016 AMJ Campbell Shorty Jenkins Classic. They then won the 2016 Canad Inns Women's Classic the following month. A week later, the team lost in the final of the 2016 Masters of Curling against the Allison Flaxey rink. A month later, they lost to Jennifer Jones in the final of the 2016 Canada Cup of Curling. The rink lost 2 games in the round robin of the 2017 Ontario Scotties Tournament of Hearts, finishing second in the round robin behind Jacqueline Harrison. They won both their playoff matches, including defeating Harrison in the final, qualifying the team to represent Ontario at the 2017 Scotties Tournament of Hearts. In the final, Team Homan defeated Manitoba's Michelle Englot to win the Scotties, her third Scotties title in four years. Both teams went 10–1 in the round robin, with Homan's lone loss against Englot. Englot beat Homan once again in the 1 vs. 2 game, then Homan beat Northern Ontario's (Krista McCarville) in the semi-final to force the re-match against Englot in the final. At the 2017 world championship in Beijing, Homan's rink became the third team in tournament history to go unbeaten in round-robin play, joining fellow Canadian Colleen Jones from 2003 and Sweden's Anette Norberg from 2005. She went unbeaten right to the end, the first team to do so, winning the gold medal by beating Anna Sidorova (for the 3rd consecutive time, with wins in the round robin, 1 vs. 2 playoff game, and final) 8–3 for the gold medal, her first world title and completing her medal set at worlds. The Homan rink finished the season by winning the 2017 Humpty's Champions Cup. In mixed doubles, Homan and partner John Morris were runners-up at the 2017 Canadian Mixed Doubles Curling Championship, losing to Joanne Courtney and Reid Carruthers in the final.

=== Olympic run (2017–18) ===
Homan began the 2017–18 curling season by winning the 2017 Prestige Hotels & Resorts Curling Classic and then the Curlers Corner Autumn Gold Curling Classic the following week. Homan and her team won the 2017 Canadian Olympic Curling Trials in her hometown of Ottawa, defeating previously unbeaten Chelsea Carey in the final. The Homan rink lost just one game in the tournament, against Carey in the round robin. In her first event since winning the trials, Homan curled just 64% at the 2018 Continental Cup of Curling as a member of Team North America. Her team's record at the event was 0–3–1, and she also lost in her mixed doubles match with Brett Gallant. Despite this, Team North America won the event on a draw to the button by Brad Gushue, breaking a 30–30 tie. The team then played at the 2018 Winter Olympics, where they started with 3 consecutive losses. Losing to the team from Denmark meant that Canada was 0–3 for the first time ever at an Olympics. The game against Denmark was marked with controversy when Denmark burned a rock as it was coming to a rest, when a sweeper touched the rock with their broom. Rather than letting the rock be adjusted, Homan removed the stone. Joan McCusker, commentating for CBC at the Olympics, said of Homan's move that "I think that was a rash move to take it off. They should have left it in play. It doesn't look good on you." Homan and team won their next three games to stay in playoff contention but lost their next two, with their fifth loss against Eve Muirhead officially eliminating them from medal contention. This made Homan's team the first Canadian Olympic curlers to not play for or win a medal. The team went winless at the 2018 Players' Championship in April, but they won the final event of the year, the 2018 Humpty's Champions Cup, defeating Kerri Einarson in the final.

=== Post-Olympics (2018–2020) ===
==== 2018–19 ====
Team Homan began the 2018–19 curling season by winning the first leg of the Curling World Cup, defeating Sweden's Anna Hasselborg in the final. The following month, Hasselborg defeated Homan in the final of the 2018 Masters. Homan won the next Grand Slam event, the 2018 Tour Challenge, defeating Tracy Fleury in the final. At the 2018 Canada Cup, the Homan rink went 5–2 in the round robin and lost in the semifinal to Jennifer Jones. A week later, the team won the 2018 National, beating Kerri Einarson in the final. The next month, Homan won her third Grand Slam of the season, the 2019 Meridian Canadian Open, defeating Silvana Tirinzoni in the final. A week later, she participated in the 2019 Continental Cup on Team North America, losing to Team World. She won one game in the event, in the mixed team scramble. Homan and her rink played in the 2019 Ontario Scotties Tournament of Hearts, having missed the previous year's event due to the Olympics and having won the 2017 Scotties. At the event, the team lost just one game and won their fourth provincial title. The event was marked by an incident of bullying aimed at Homan. A "number of curlers" at the event voted for her to win the tournament's sportsmanship award to protest the fact that the team had two members (Homan and Courtney) living in Alberta. Teams were only allowed one out-of-province "import" player; however, Homan maintained a residence in Ontario and was exempted from requirements as she was a full-time student in Edmonton. At the 2019 Scotties Tournament of Hearts, her team finished the round robin at 5–2, moving on to the championship pool, where they finished at 8–3, in third place. The team qualified for the final, beating Northern Ontario's Krista McCarville in the 3 vs. 4 game and Saskatchewan's Robyn Silvernagle in the semi-final. They lost the final to Alberta's Chelsea Carey in an extra end, despite leading 5–1 in the fourth end. At the 2019 Players' Championship, the team missed the playoffs after posting a 2–3 round robin record and losing a tie-breaker to Satsuki Fujisawa. They finished the season with a semi-final finish at the 2019 Champions Cup. In 2019, Homan was named the fourth-greatest Canadian female curler in history by The Sports Network (TSN), the main television broadcaster of major curling events, following a poll of broadcasters, reporters and top curlers.

==== 2019–20 ====
In their first event of the 2019–20 season, Team Homan made the semi-finals of the 2019 AMJ Campbell Shorty Jenkins Classic. They then won the 2019 Colonial Square Ladies Classic. In mid-October, the team made the final of the 2019 Canad Inns Women's Classic, losing to Elena Stern. They missed the playoffs at all four Slams of the season as both the Players' Championship and the Champions Cup were cancelled due to the COVID-19 pandemic. Team Homan won the first spot in the 2021 Canadian Olympic Curling Trials by defeating Tracy Fleury in the final of the 2019 Canada Cup. The team went undefeated at the 2020 Ontario Scotties Tournament of Hearts, defeating Hollie Duncan in the final. At the 2020 Scotties Tournament of Hearts, they won their second straight silver medal, losing the final to Manitoba's Kerri Einarson.

=== Sarah Wilkes joins the team (2020–2022) ===
Team Homan announced on March 12, 2020, that the team was parting ways with longtime lead Lisa Weagle. On March 17, 2020, the team announced they would be adding Sarah Wilkes as their new second, with Joanne Courtney moving to lead.

==== 2020–21 ====
The 2021 Ontario provincial playdowns were cancelled due to the COVID-19 pandemic in Ontario. As the 2020 provincial champions, Homan's team was chosen to represent Ontario at the 2021 Scotties Tournament of Hearts in Calgary. Up to that point, Homan had only played in one tour game the entire season in the Okotoks Ladies Classic in November, before that event was cancelled due to a province-wide shutdown in Alberta. Three months later, Homan entered the 2021 Scotties at eight months pregnant. She had a successful round robin, with a 7–1 record, including a win against defending champion Kerri Einarson. She entered the championship pool as the first seed, where she won three games and lost one to Manitoba's Jennifer Jones. Because of their earlier win against Einarson, Homan's team received a bye to the final. There, they lost 9–7 to Einarson after Homan missed a freeze in the last end, resulting in Einarson not needing to throw her last rock. Homan was named Second Team All-Star skip for the tournament. A month after the Scotties, Homan gave birth to her second child, Bowyn of March 25, and missed the 2021 Canadian Mixed Doubles Curling Championship in the process (she had qualified with John Morris). Having just given birth three weeks prior, she had originally planned on not playing in the two Slams scheduled for the end of the season, but later decided she was physically able to do so. At the first of Slam, the 2021 Champions Cup, she had no problem claiming her 11th career Slam title, defeating Silvana Tirinzoni in the final. A week later she played in the 2021 Players' Championship, the last event for Team Homan of the season. At the Players', she led her team all the way to the final, before losing to Einarson in a re-match of the Scotties final.

==== 2021–22 ====
Team Homan made it to the quarterfinals of their first slam of the 2021–22 season, the 2021 Masters, where they were beaten by Alina Kovaleva. Two weeks later, they played in the 2021 National, where they were eliminated in the quarters again, this time by Anna Hasselborg. Next for Team Homan was the 2021 Canadian Olympic Curling Trials where they attempted to qualify for the Olympics again. The team, however, did not have a successful week, finishing with a 2–6 record. Team Homan's record over the season was not good enough to give them an automatic qualifying spot at the 2022 Ontario Scotties Tournament of Hearts, forcing them to play in an open qualifier. The team did qualify at the Open Qualifier, but the Ontario Scotties were postponed due to new COVID-19 regulations put into place by the province, shutting down sports event. The spread of COVID-19's omicron variant also cancelled the 2022 Canadian Mixed Doubles Curling Olympic Trials which Homan was set to participate in with John Morris. With the postponement of the Ontario Scotties, CurlON announced that they would be selecting Team Hollie Duncan over Team Homan to represent Ontario if Homan was selected to represent Canada in the mixed doubles event at the 2022 Olympics (as the Trials had been cancelled). However, if Homan wasn't selected, then CurlON would select Team Homan to play in the Scotties instead. This plan of action was considered confusing and disappointing to the teams involved. Homan would end up being selected to represent Canada at the Olympics, giving Team Duncan the right to represent Ontario at the 2022 Scotties. However, Team Homan (sans Homan) qualified for the Scotties as Team Wild Card #3. For the Tournament of Hearts, Homan's teammates Emma Miskew, Sarah Wilkes and Joanne Courtney added Allison Flaxey to their lineup. At the championship, the team finished with a 4–4 record, not advancing to the playoff round.

At the mixed doubles event at the Olympics, Homan and Morris struggled, finishing with a 5–4 record. Their record was tied for fourth with Sweden's Almida de Val and Oskar Eriksson, however, due to their head-to-head loss against the Swedish pair, they missed the playoffs. The pair missed their chance at a spot by mere millimetres, as their final shot in their last game against Italy went too far, thus losing the game. Team Homan had to wait until April 2022 to play in the postponed Ontario Hearts, which they ended up winning, beating Carly Howard in the final. The team wrapped up their season with the two final slams, making it to the semifinals at the 2022 Players' Championship where they lost to Anna Hasselborg, and the quarters of the 2022 Champions Cup, where they lost to Kerri Einarson.

In March 2022, after Joanne Courtney announced she would be stepping back from competitive curling, it was announced that Tracy Fleury would be joining the team for the 2022–23 season. They did not announce whether Homan or Fleury would skip the new lineup.

=== Tracy Fleury joins as third thrower (2022–present) ===
==== 2022–23 ====
In August 2022, it was announced that Tracy Fleury would be skipping Team Homan, with Homan herself continuing to throw last rocks on the team. With the addition of Fleury, Emma Miskew was moved to the second position for the first time since joining forces with Homan as a teenager. The new lineup made their debut at the 2022 Saville Shoot-Out, making it to the final before losing to Jennifer Jones and her new team. Later on in the month, Team Homan played in the inaugural PointsBet Invitational tournament organized by Curling Canada. The team made it to the quarterfinals, where they lost to Team Scheidegger, which was skipped by Kristie Moore in a draw-to-the button to break a 6–6 tie. The next month in October, the team played in the first Slam of the season, the 2022 National. There, the team made it to the quarterfinals before losing out to another new-look team skipped by Kaitlyn Lawes. Later that month, the team played in the next Slam, the 2022 Tour Challenge. The team won the event, defeating Kerri Einarson 8–4 in the final, to pick up Homan's 12th career Slam, and the first for her new team. In November, the team won their second Tour event of the season at the Red Deer Curling Classic, defeating Casey Scheidegger in the final. In December, the team played in their third Slam of the season, the 2022 Masters. The team made it to the final against Team Einarson again, but this time Einarson had the best of her, beating Homan 6–5 in an extra end. In January, the team played in the 2023 Canadian Open, making it as far as the quarterfinals this time before matching up against Einarson. Team Homan couldn't get past Einarson again, and were eliminated after a 7–2 decision. Later in the month, the team won the 2023 Ontario Scotties Tournament of Hearts, Homan's seventh career provincial championship. They defeated Hollie Duncan in the final. The team represented Ontario at the 2023 Scotties Tournament of Hearts, going 6–2 in pool play. This put the team into the Championship round, where they were eliminated after a loss to Nova Scotia, skipped by Christina Black. In March, Homan paired up with British Columbia's Tyler Tardi at the 2023 Canadian Mixed Doubles Curling Championship. The pair went 6–1 in pool play, but were eliminated by the eventual winners of Jennifer Jones and Brent Laing in the playoffs. In April, Team Homan played in the 2023 Players' Championship, missing the playoffs, but rebounded to win the 2023 Champions Cup to cap off the season. The team beat their rivals in the Kerri Einarson rink in the final, coming back from a 4–0 deficit to win the championship 6–5, giving Homan her 13th Grand Slam title. Homan took over as skip at the event, as it was announced she was pregnant.

==== 2023–24 ====
At the beginning of the 2023–24 curling season, it was announced that Homan would take over as skip of the team, with Fleury taking on regular third duties. The team also brought in former World Men's Champion and Olympic silver medallist Don Bartlett as their coach. It was also announced that the team would be sponsored by Ottawa-based nail polish company Holo Taco. The team began the season without Homan, who had just given birth to her third child. With Heather Nedohin in her place, the team went on to win the 2023 Saville Shootout. Homan returned to her team for the 2023 PointsBet Invitational, where they made it to the final, beating Kerri Einarson there 9–7 to claim the title, and $50,000 in the process. Three weeks later, Team Homan played in their first Slam of the season, the 2023 Tour Challenge. There, the team went 2–2, being eliminated from playoff contention due to a poor tournament draw to the button shootout score. The team made it to the final in the next Slam, the 2023 National. There, they went undefeated until they faced the equally undefeated Gim Eun-ji Korean rink in that game, which they lost 7–6. A week later, the team played in the Red Deer Curling Classic again, winning their second straight title after easily defeating the Selena Sturmay rink in the final, 8–1. The team continued their success in December, winning the 2023 Masters, Homan's 14th career Grand Slam, and first of the season. They defeated Silvana Tirinzoni of Switzerland in the final, 8–4. A month later, the team won their second slam title in a row, and Homan's 15th in her career when the rink downed Tirinzoni again in the final of the Canadian Open. The team won 5–4, stealing the game in an extra end, after trailing 4–2 after the seventh end.

New qualifying rules for the Scotties Tournament of Hearts allowed Team Homan a pre-qualifying spot at the 2024 Scotties Tournament of Hearts without having to play in the 2024 playdowns. At the Hearts, the team went undefeated, winning all 11 of their games, including the final, where they beat Jennifer Jones, another pre-qualifier team, 5–4. It was Jones' last Hearts, as she decided to retire prior to the event. The win would be Homan's fourth career Hearts title.

With the Scotties win, the team went on to represent Canada at the 2024 World Women's Curling Championship. At the Worlds, Homan led Canada to an 11–1 round robin record, including ending Switzerland and Silvana Tirinzoni's 42 game winning streak at the Women's Worlds, which dated back to the 2021 Worlds. Her only defeat came against South Korea (skipped by Gim Eun-ji) in the last draw, a meaningless game for the team, as they had clinched first place and a bye to the semifinals. Homan and Canada faced-off against the Koreans again in the semifinals, and this time beat them, 9–7. This put her team into the final, where she faced off against the four-time defending World Champion Tirinzoni team. Heading into the ninth end of the game, the team was down 5–4 to the Swiss, but Homan made a split of a rock in the 12-foot on her last to score three, giving her team a 7–5 lead. Switzerland conceded the game in the 10th after deciding they didn't have a shot to tie the game, giving Homan her second World Championship title.

Team Homan ended the 2023–24 season at the 2024 Players' Championship. The rink went undefeated in the tournament until the semifinal, where they lost to the same Tirinzoni rink they had beaten in the World Championship final. Team Homan would finish the season with an "unprecedented" 67–7 win-loss record.

During the 2024 off season, it was announced that Brendan Bottcher would be added as the team's coach, as well as Homan's mixed doubles partner. Bottcher would only coach the team until October 2024 when it was announced he was joining the Brad Gushue rink as their second.

On June 21, 2024, Team Homan was awarded the Key to the City of Ottawa.

==== 2024–25 ====
To begin the 2024–25 season, it was announced that AMJ Campbell would be the team's title sponsor. The team won their first event of the season, the AMJ Campbell sponsored 2024 Shorty Jenkins Classic. Two weeks later, the team won their second straight PointsBet Invitational, defeating Kayla Skrlik's rink in the final, 8–3. The following week, Team Homan played in the first Grand Slam event of the season, the 2024 Tour Challenge. The rink made it to the final, where costly mistakes by Homan in the sixth end resulted in a 5–4 loss to Team Kerri Einarson. A month later, Homan and her rink represented Canada at the 2024 Pan Continental Curling Championships. There, the team took home the gold medal after stealing a single point in the 10th end of the final, following a measurement, beating South Korea's Gim Eun-ji 6–5. It was the first gold medal for Canada on the women's side. The team had gone undefeated in the event. A week after the pan continentals, Homan won her career 16th Grand Slam, when she defeated Switzerland's Silvana Tirinzoni, 7–5 in the final of the Canadian Open. The team had gone undefeated again, winning all seven of their games.

In mixed doubles play, Homan and partner Brendan Bottcher qualified for the 2025 Canadian Mixed Doubles Curling Olympic Trials after winning a qualification event in Guelph held at the end of November. At the Trials, the pair made it to the final, where they lost to the pairing of Jocelyn Peterman and Brett Gallant, 8–7. Misses by Homan on her last shots in the first and second ends contributed to going down 4–0 early on, and were not able to claw themselves back.

A week after Homan qualified for the Canadian Mixed Doubles Curling Olympic Trials, Homan won her second straight slam at the 2024 National, when her rink defeated Sweden's Anna Hasselborg in the final, 6–5. It was the team's 23rd straight win, and put their season record at 40–2. It was her 17th career Slam title, tying her with Jennifer Jones for the most ever, taking into account no longer recognized, defunct slams. Team Homan faced a re-match against Hasselborg in the final of the 2025 Masters, the next Slam. This time, they weren't as successful, going down to defeat, 7–5.

As defending champions, the Homan rink automatically qualified for the 2025 Scotties Tournament of Hearts as Team Canada. For the second straight year, the team went through the tournament going undefeated, stringing together a total of 22 straight wins at the Hearts over the two years, the first time a team has ever done so. In the final, the team faced off against the Kerri Einarson rink, beating her Manitoba team 6–1. Homan curled a perfect 100 per cent, the first curler to ever have a perfect game in a Scotties final, though Homan believed the statistician was being generous. It was Homan's fifth career national women's championship. The win qualified her team to represent Canada at the 2025 World Women's Curling Championship in South Korea. Prior to the Scotties, it was announced that Jennifer Jones would coach the team for the event.

At the World Curling Championships, Homan led Canada to a 10–2 round robin record, losing to Scotland (Sophie Jackson) and the host South Koreans (Gim Eun-ji). The team finished with the same record as the Koreans, but since they lost to them, had to settle for third place heading into the playoffs. In the playoffs, they avenged their losses to both Scotland and South Korea to get to the final, where they faced Switzerland and Silvana Tirinzoni, setting up a rematch of the 2024 final. The final was a close affair until the eighth end, when Homan made a delicate tap to sit two on her last shot. In response, Swiss fourth Alina Pätz had to make a draw to the button to score, but overcurled and hit a guard. This gave Canada a 6–3 lead. Pätz missed her last shot in the 9th, and the Swiss conceded the game, giving Homan a 7–3 win. With the win, Homan and her team became the first Canadian rink to win back to back world championships since Sandra Schmirler in 1993 and 1994. It was the third World Championship for Homan, and it was also the first time a Canadian men's or women's national team had won a gold at a World Championship overseas since Homan won the Worlds in 2017.

Team Homan finished the 2024–25 season at the 2025 Players' Championship Grand Slam event. Prior to the event, her team faced off against the World #1 men's team Bruce Mouat of Scotland, who were coming off winning the 2025 World Men's Curling Championship the day before in a "Battle of the Sexes" charity event. The match was played as a skins game with each team's winnings going to charity. Team Mouat won the game, taking home $10,000, while Homan won $2,000, with their winnings going to the Sandra Schmirler Foundation. In the main event, Team Homan made it to the final, where they faced off against Silvana Tirinzoni in a re-match of the World Championships. Homan lost the game 5–4, taking home $40,000 in the process. Over the course of the season, Homan made it to the final in all 10 events they played in. She would finish the season with a 75–8 record.

==== 2025–26: Homan's third Olympics ====
In August 2025, it was announced that the team had found a new coach in two-time World bronze medallist Heather Nedohin, who had spared for the rink in 2023 while Homan was pregnant. In the team's first event of the 2025–26 curling season, they lost to Denmark's Madeleine Dupont in the semifinal of the 2025 AMJ Campbell Shorty Jenkins Classic. Two weeks later, the team played in their first Slam of the season, the AMJ Masters. The team won all seven of their games at the event, defeating rivals Silvana Tirinzoni in the final, 6–4. Homan would then go on to win her second slam of the season at the 2025 Tour Challenge, again defeating Tirinzoni in the final. This would be both Homan and Miskew's 19th career grand slam title, passing Kevin Martin for most all-time. Team Homan would continue their dominance at the 2025 GSOC Tahoe, defeating Tirinzoni in the third straight slam final of the season, extending their record with a 20th Grand Slam of Curling title.

The Homan rink would complete their bid to represent Canada at the 2026 Winter Olympics by winning the 2025 Canadian Olympic Curling Trials, winning both games against Christina Black in the best-of-three final, marking Rachel's third Olympic appearance. They entered the Olympic tournament as one of the favourites, but performed poorly at the start of the round robin, winning only one of their first four games. Following this, the Homan rink won their final five games in a row to qualify for the semi-finals, the first time in Homan's Olympic career she had progressed beyond the round robin.

== Personal life ==
Homan was born at the Ottawa Civic Hospital in Ottawa to parents Cathy and Craig Homan. She has an older brother, Mark, who is also a curler. Growing up in the Ottawa suburb of Orleans, Homan attended Cairine Wilson Secondary School and graduated from the University of Ottawa with a degree in Human Kinetics in 2011. She graduated from the University of Alberta with a bachelor's degree in education in 2020. Homan met Shawn Germain, a former professional hockey player from Edmonton in 2014, and the two married in September 2016. They live in Beaumont, Alberta, and used to live in St. Paul, Alberta. Homan gave birth to a son, Ryatt Mitch Germain, in June 2019, a daughter, Bowyn, in March 2021, and another son, Briggs, in September 2023. She is a fan of the Ottawa Senators NHL team.

== Year-by-year statistics ==
=== Team events ===
Year	Team	Position	Event	Finish	Record	Pct. (Note: Round robin only)
2003	Homan (RCC)	Skip	Ontario Bantam	1st	8–1	–
2003	Bushfield (CVCC)	Third	Ontario Bantam Mixed	1st	5–1	–
2004	Homan (CVCC)	Skip	Ontario Winter Games	1st	N/A	–
2004	Homan (CVCC)	Skip	Ontario Bantam	1st	6–1	–
2005	Homan (CVCC)	Skip	Ontario Bantam	1st	N/A	–
2006	Homan (CVCC)	Skip	Ontario Bantam	1st	7–1	–
2006	Homan (CVCC)	Skip	Ontario Winter Games	1st	N/A	–
2006	Homan (CVCC)	Skip	U18 International	1st	N/A	–
2007	Homan (CVCC)	Skip	Ontario Juniors	3rd	N/A	–
2007	Ontario (Homan)	Skip	Canada Winter Games	1st	7–0	–
2008	Homan (OCC)	Skip	Ontario Juniors	2nd	6–4	–
2009	Homan (OCC)	Skip	Ontario Juniors	1st	8–0	–
2009	Ontario (Homan)	Skip	Canadian Juniors	2nd	10–3	80
2009	Homan (OCC)	Skip	COCT – Pre	5th	3–3	75
2010	Homan (OCC)	Skip	Ontario Juniors	1st	7–1	–
2010	Ontario (Homan)	Skip	Canadian Juniors	1st	13–0	84
2010	Canada (Homan)	Skip	World Juniors	2nd	9–2	–
2011	Homan (OCC)	Skip	Ontario STOH	1st	10–1	–
2011	Ontario (Homan)	Skip	2011 STOH	4th	9–5	79
2012 (Note: Event occurred in the 2011 calendar year, but was billed as the 2012 edition.)	M. Homan (RCC)	Third	Ontario Mixed	1st	N/A	–
2012	Ontario (M. Homan)	Third	Canadian Mixed	6th	8–5	75
2011	Homan (OCC)	Skip	Canada Cup	4th	2–4	79
2012	Homan (OCC)	Skip	Ontario STOH	2nd	10–1	–
2013	Homan (OCC)	Skip	Ontario STOH	1st	11–0	–
2013	Ontario (Homan)	Skip	2013 STOH	1st	12–1	83
2013	Canada (Homan)	Skip	2013 WCC	3rd	10–4	82
2013	Homan	Skip	2013 COCT	3rd	4–4	79
2014	North America	Skip	Cont'l Cup	1st	2–0–1	81
2014	Team Canada (Homan)	Skip	2014 STOH	1st	13–0	90
2014	Canada (Homan)	Skip	2014 WCC	2nd	11–2	85
2014	Homan (OCC)	Skip	Canada Cup	2nd	5–2	79
2015	Canada	Skip	Cont'l Cup	1st	4–0–0	80
2015	Team Canada (Homan)	Skip	2015 STOH	3rd	8–5	80
2015	Homan (OCC)	Skip	Canada Cup	1st	6–1	81
2016	North America	Skip	Cont'l Cup	1st	2–0–1	85
2016	Homan (OCC)	Skip	Ontario STOH	2nd	9–2	–
2016	Homan (OCC)	Skip	Canada Cup	2nd	5–3	78
2017	Homan (OCC)	Skip	Ontario STOH	1st	7–2	–
2017	Ontario (Homan)	Skip	2017 STOH	1st	12–2	84
2017	Canada (Homan)	Skip	2017 WCC	1st	13–0	85
2017	Homan	Skip	2017 COCT	1st	9–1	85
2018	North America	Skip	Cont'l Cup	1st	0–3–1	64
2018	Canada	Skip	OG	6th	4–5	78
2018	Canada	Skip	CWC	1st	6–1	–
2018	Homan (OCC)	Skip	Canada Cup	3rd	5–3	78
2019	North America	Skip	Cont'l Cup	2nd	1–2–1	72
2019	Homan (OCC)	Skip	Ontario STOH	1st	7–1	–
2019	Ontario (Homan)	Skip	2019 STOH	2nd	10–4	84
2019	Homan (OCC)	Skip	Canada Cup	1st	6–1	85
2020	Canada	Skip	Cont'l Cup	2nd	3–1	88
2020	Homan (OCC)	Skip	Ontario STOH	1st	9–0	–
2020	Ontario (Homan)	Skip	2020 STOH	2nd	11–3	85
2021	Ontario (Homan)	Skip	2021 STOH	2nd	10–3	83
2021	Homan	Skip	2021 COCT	9th	2–6	72
2022	Homan (OCC)	Skip	Ontario STOH	1st	6–2	
2023	Homan (OCC)	Fourth	Ontario STOH	1st	7–1	
2023	Ontario (Fleury)	Fourth	2023 STOH	5th	6–3	82
2024	Ontario (Homan)	Skip	2024 STOH	1st	11–0	91
2024	Canada (Homan)	Skip	2024 WCC	1st	13–1	89
2024	Canada (Homan)	Skip	2024 PCCC	1st	9–0	78
2025	Canada (Homan)	Skip	2025 STOH	1st	11–0	86
2025	Canada (Homan)	Skip	2025 WCC	1st	13–2	88
2025	Canada (Homan)	Skip	2025 PCCC	2nd	6–3	93
2025	Homan	Skip	2025 COCT	1st	8–1	85
2026	Canada (Homan)	Skip	OG	3rd	7–4	85
Scotties Tournament of Hearts Totals					113–26	84
World Championship Totals					60–9	86
Olympic Curling Trial Totals					23–12	82
Olympic Games Totals					11–9	81

=== Mixed doubles ===
Year	Partner	Event	Finish	Record	Pct.
2014	E. J. Harnden	Cont'l Cup	1st	1–0	63
2015	E. J. Harnden	Cont'l Cup	1st	0–0–1	55
2016	John Morris	Cont'l Cup	1st	1–0	78
2016	Mark Nichols	CMDCT	T5th	7–2	–
2017	John Morris	CMDCC	2nd	9–1	–
2018	Brett Gallant	Cont'l Cup	1st	0–1	61
2019	Kevin Koe	Cont'l Cup	2nd	0–1	75
2020	Ben Hebert	Cont'l Cup	2nd	0–1	64
2022	John Morris	OG	5th	5–4	72
2023	Tyler Tardi	CMDCC	3rd	8–2	78
2025	Brendan Bottcher	CMDCT	2nd	9–3	77
2026	Brendan Bottcher	CMDCC	T3rd	7–2	–
Olympic Games Totals				5–4	72

== Teams ==
Season	Skip	Third	Second	Lead	Notes	Tour earnings (rank) (CAD)	Coach
2002–03	Rachel Homan	Emma Miskew	Alison Kreviazuk	Nicole Johnston		n/a	Doug Kreviazuk
2003–04	Rachel Homan	Emma Miskew	Alison Kreviazuk	Nicole Johnston		n/a	Earle Morris
2004–05	Rachel Homan	Emma Miskew	Alison Kreviazuk	Nicole Johnston		$800 (102nd)	
2005–06	Rachel Homan	Emma Miskew	Lynn Kreviazuk	Jamie Sinclair	Team qualified for the 2007 Canada Games. Nicole Johnston played lead at the Optimist International U-18.	DNP	Earle Morris; Doug Kreviazuk (Opt. Intl. U-18)
2006–07	Rachel Homan	Emma Miskew	Alison Kreviazuk	Nicole Johnston	For the Canada Games team, see previous season	$2,250 (71st)	Earle Morris
2007–08	Rachel Homan	Emma Miskew	Alison Kreviazuk	Lynn Kreviazuk		$11,000 (18th)	Earle Morris
2008–09	Rachel Homan	Emma Miskew	Alison Kreviazuk	Lynn Kreviazuk		$31,200 (8th)	Earle Morris
2009–10	Rachel Homan	Emma Miskew	Alison Kreviazuk	Lynn Kreviazuk	Substitute Laura Crocker for A. Kreviazuk at 2010 Canadian Junior Curling Championships	$5,500 (32nd)	Earle Morris
2010–11	Rachel Homan	Emma Miskew	Alison Kreviazuk	Lisa Weagle	Alternate Sherry Middaugh for Scotties	$27,300 (8th)	Andrea Ronnebeck
2011–12	Rachel Homan	Emma Miskew	Alison Kreviazuk	Lisa Weagle		$8,800 (26th)	Andrea Ronnebeck
2012–13	Rachel Homan	Emma Miskew	Alison Kreviazuk	Lisa Weagle	Alternate Stephanie LeDrew for Scotties and Worlds	$60,800 (1st)	Earle Morris
2013–14	Rachel Homan	Emma Miskew	Alison Kreviazuk	Lisa Weagle	Alternate Heather Smith for Olympic Trials; Alternate Stephanie LeDrew for Scotties and Worlds	$51,900 (4th)	Earle Morris
2014–15	Rachel Homan	Emma Miskew	Joanne Courtney	Lisa Weagle	Alternate Cheryl Kreviazuk for Scotties	$91,608 (1st)	Richard Hart
2015–16	Rachel Homan	Emma Miskew	Joanne Courtney	Lisa Weagle		$183,754 (1st)	Marcel Rocque; Richard Hart
2016–17	Rachel Homan	Emma Miskew	Joanne Courtney	Lisa Weagle	Alternate Cheryl Kreviazuk for Scotties and Worlds; Sarah Wilkes in for Courtney at 2017 Humpty's Champions Cup	$132,500 (1st)	Adam Kingsbury
2017–18	Rachel Homan	Emma Miskew	Joanne Courtney	Lisa Weagle	Alternate Cheryl Kreviazuk for Olympic Trials; Alternate Cheryl Bernard for Olympics	$43,500 (13th)	Adam Kingsbury
2018–19	Rachel Homan	Emma Miskew	Joanne Courtney	Lisa Weagle	Alternate Cheryl Kreviazuk for Scotties; Substitute Laura Walker at the 2019 Players' Championship; Jolene Campbell in for Courtney at the 2019 Champions Cup	$181,848 (1st)	Marcel Rocque
2019–20	Rachel Homan	Emma Miskew	Joanne Courtney	Lisa Weagle	Alternate Cheryl Kreviazuk for Scotties	$35,300 (13th)	Marcel Rocque
2020–21	Rachel Homan	Emma Miskew	Sarah Wilkes	Joanne Courtney	Alternate Danielle Inglis for Scotties; Alternate Laura Walker at Grand Slams	$50,000 (NR) (Note: Due to the COVID-19 pandemic, there was no official money ranking for this season. Homan won $25,000 at the Champions Cup and $25,000 at the Players' Championship, the only two tour events she played in.)	Randy Ferbey
2021–22	Rachel Homan	Emma Miskew	Sarah Wilkes	Joanne Courtney		$50,633 (9th) (Note: Following the 2020–21 season, tour money rankings were no longer published. Ranking displayed is the end of season World Curling Federation team ranking)	Marcel Rocque
2022–23	Rachel Homan (Fourth)	Tracy Fleury (Skip)	Emma Miskew	Sarah Wilkes	Alternate Kira Brunton for Scotties; Alternate Rachelle Brown at Slams	$123,000 (3rd)	Ryan Fry
2023–24	Rachel Homan	Tracy Fleury	Emma Miskew	Sarah Wilkes	Alternate Rachelle Brown for Scotties and Worlds	$203,000 (1st)	Don Bartlett
2024–25	Rachel Homan	Tracy Fleury	Emma Miskew	Sarah Wilkes	Alternate Rachelle Brown	$255,000 (1st)	Brendan Bottcher (Sept.–Oct.); Jennifer Jones (STOH)
2025–26	Rachel Homan	Tracy Fleury	Emma Miskew	Sarah Wilkes	Alternate Rachelle Brown		Heather Nedohin

== Grand Slam record ==
Key
C	Champion
F	Lost in Final
SF	Lost in Semifinal
QF	Lost in Quarterfinals
R16	Lost in the round of 16
Q	Did not advance to playoffs
T2	Played in Tier 2 event
DNP	Did not participate in event
N/A	Not a Grand Slam event that season

Event	2008–09	2009–10	2010–11	2011–12	2012–13	2013–14	2014–15	2015–16	2016–17	2017–18	2018–19	2019–20	2020–21	2021–22	2022–23	2023–24	2024–25	2025–26	2026–27
Invitational	N/A	N/A	N/A	N/A	N/A	N/A	N/A	F	QF	Q	C	Q	N/A	N/A	C	Q	F	C	Q
Masters	N/A	N/A	N/A	N/A	C	C	SF	C	F	Q	F	Q	N/A	QF	F	C	F	C	QF
National	N/A	N/A	N/A	N/A	N/A	N/A	N/A	C	QF	QF	C	Q	N/A	QF	QF	F	C	C	SF
Open	N/A	N/A	N/A	N/A	N/A	N/A	F	C	Q	QF	C	Q	N/A	N/A	QF	C	C	QF	
Players'	QF	DNP	F	DNP	QF	F	SF	QF	QF	Q	Q	N/A	F	SF	Q	SF	F	SF	
Champions Cup	N/A	N/A	N/A	N/A	N/A	N/A	N/A	F	C	C	SF	N/A	C	QF	C	N/A	N/A	N/A	N/A

=== Former events ===
Event	2008–09	2009–10	2010–11	2011–12	2012–13	2013–14	2014–15	2015–16	2016–17	2017–18	2018–19
Elite 10	N/A	N/A	N/A	N/A	N/A	N/A	N/A	Q (Note: Homan's rink was invited to play in the 2016 Elite 10, which was a men's-only Slam at the time. There, her team won one game in the round robin (against Charley Thomas), and lost three, missing the playoffs.)	N/A	N/A	SF
Autumn Gold	DNP	DNP	DNP	Q	F	SF	F	N/A	N/A	N/A	N/A
Colonial Square	N/A	N/A	N/A	N/A	SF	Q	DNP	N/A	N/A	N/A	N/A
Manitoba Liquor & Lotteries	DNP	DNP	Q	Q	F	DNP	N/A	N/A	N/A	N/A	N/A
Sobeys Slam	DNP	N/A	Q	N/A	N/A	N/A	N/A	N/A	N/A	N/A	N/A
Wayden Transportation	SF	N/A	N/A	N/A	N/A	N/A	N/A	N/A	N/A	N/A	N/A
