= 2024 Canadian Mixed Doubles Curling Championship =

Curling tournament

- Host city: Fredericton, New Brunswick
- Arena: Aitken University Centre & Capital Winter Club
- Dates: March 17–22
- Winner: (Manitoba) Lott / Lott
- Curling club: Winnipeg Beach CC, Winnipeg Beach
- Female: Kadriana Lott
- Male: Colton Lott
- Finalist: (Alberta) (Saskatchewan) Walker / Muyres

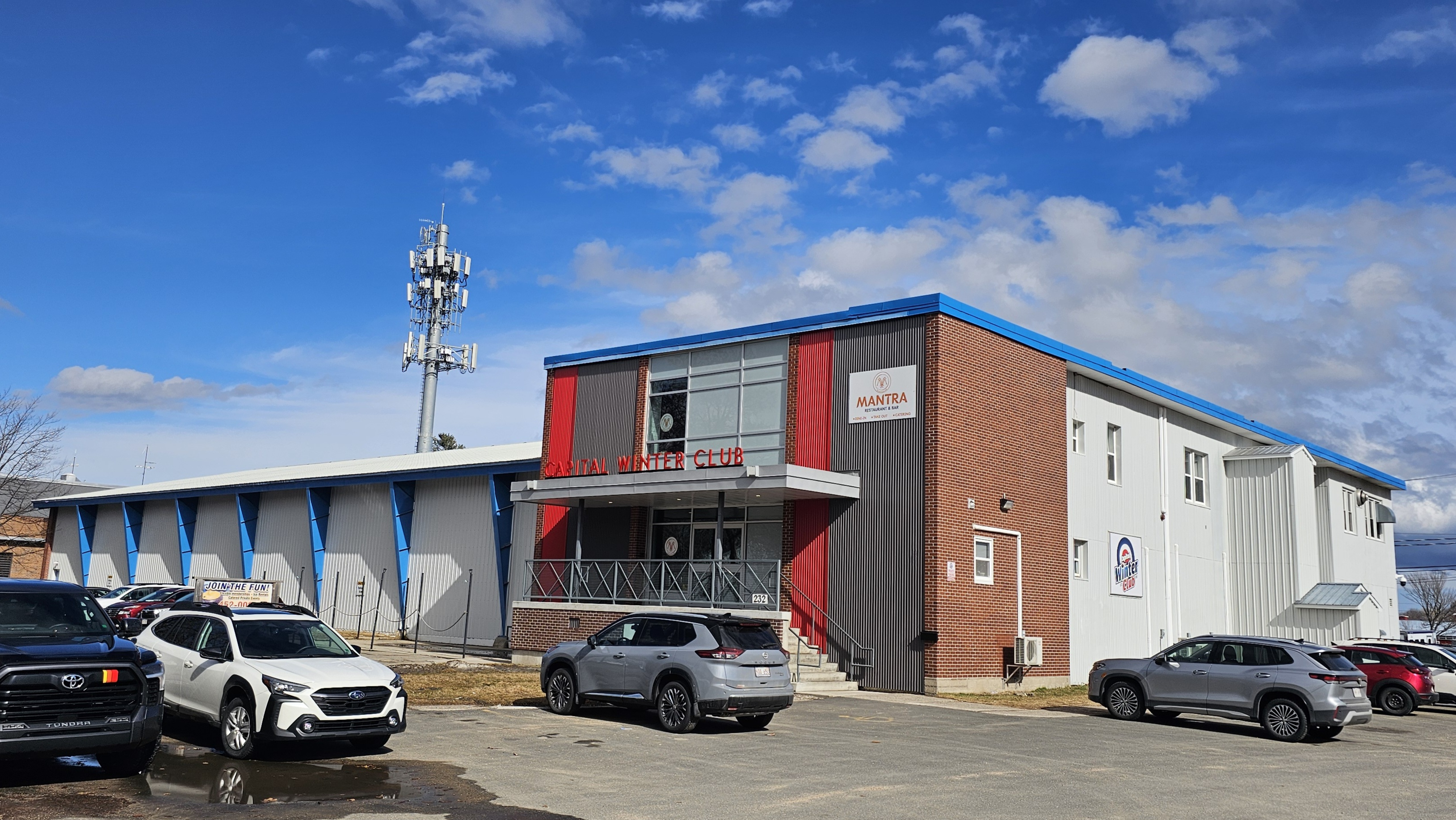
The Capital Winter Club in 2026

The 2024 Canadian Mixed Doubles Curling Championship was held from March 17 to 22 at the Aitken University Centre and the Capital Winter Club in Fredericton, New Brunswick. The winning pair of Kadriana and Colton Lott represented Canada at the 2024 World Mixed Doubles Curling Championship in Östersund, Sweden.

The format of the championship saw thirty-two teams split into four pools, each playing a seven-game round-robin with 12 teams advancing to the single knockout playoffs. The four pool winners earn byes directly into the quarterfinals, while the teams with the following eight best records, regardless of the pool, competed in the qualification playoff games. The top three teams at this event (champions Colton Lott and Kadriana Lott, runners-up Laura Walker and Kirk Muyres, and bronze medallists Jocelyn Peterman and Brett Gallant) all earned berths into the 2025 Canadian Mixed Doubles Curling Trials to represent Canada at the 2026 Winter Olympics.

== Teams ==
The teams are listed as follows:

=== Provincial and territorial champions ===
Province / Territory	Female	Male	Club(s)
Alberta	Amanda Sluchinski	Aaron Sluchinski	Airdrie Curling Club, Airdrie
British Columbia	Taylor Reese-Hansen	Corey Chester	Victoria Curling Club, Victoria
Manitoba	Kadriana Lott	Colton Lott	Winnipeg Beach Curling Club, Winnipeg Beach
New Brunswick	Melissa Adams	Alex Robichaud	Capital Winter Club, Fredericton
Newfoundland and Labrador	Jessica Wiseman	Greg Smith	RE/MAX Centre, St. John's
Northern Ontario	Jackie McCormick	Trevor Bonot	Stratton Curling Club, Stratton
Nova Scotia	Marlee Powers	Luke Saunders	Halifax Curling Club, Halifax
Ontario	Lynn Kreviazuk	David Mathers	Ottawa Curling Club, Ottawa
Prince Edward Island	Jenny White	Edward White	Crapaud Community Curling Club, Crapaud
Quebec	Kelly Tremblay	Pierre Lanoue	Nairn Curling Club, Clermont; Boucherville Curling Club, Boucherville
Saskatchewan	Christie Gamble	Dustin Kalthoff	Nutana Curling Club, Saskatoon
Yukon	Ruth Siciliano	Tyler Williams	Whitehorse Curling Club, Whitehorse

=== Canadian Mixed Doubles Ranking qualifiers ===
Female	Male	Province / Territory	Club
Jennifer Armstrong	Tyrel Griffith	New Brunswick / British Columbia	Thistle St. Andrews Curling Club, Saint John & Kelowna Curling Club, Kelowna
Véronique Bouchard	Jean-François Charest	Quebec	Club de curling Chicoutimi, Chicoutimi, Saguenay
Lauren Cheal	Greg Cheal	Quebec	Lennoxville Curling Club, Lennoxville, Sherbrooke
Jaelyn Cotter	Jim Cotter	British Columbia	Vernon Curling Club, Vernon
Émilia Gagné	Pierre-Luc Morissette	Quebec	Jacques Cartier Curling Club & Club de curling Victoria, Quebec City
Anne-Sophie Gionest	Robert Desjardins	Quebec	Club de curling Chicoutimi, Chicoutimi, Saguenay & Club de curling Riverbend, Alma
Jennifer Jones	Brent Laing	Ontario	Barrie Curling Club, Barrie
Andrea Kelly (Note: Andrea Kelly replaced Rachel Homan who was representing Canada at the 2024 World Women's Curling Championship.)	Tyler Tardi	New Brunswick / Alberta	Gage Golf & Curling Club, Oromocto & The Glencoe Club, Calgary
Chaelynn Kitz	Brayden Stewart	Saskatchewan / Manitoba	Oxbow Curling Club, Oxbow & Minnesdosa Curling Club, Minnedosa
Madison Kleiter	Rylan Kleiter	Saskatchewan	Nutana Curling Club, Saskatoon
Audrey Laplante	Jasmin Gibeau	Quebec	Buckingham Curling Club, Buckingham, Gatineau
Nancy Martin	Steve Laycock	Saskatchewan	Martensville Curling Club, Martensville & Nutana Curling Club, Saskatoon
Paige Papley	Evan van Amsterdam	Alberta	Saville Community Sports Centre & Thistle Curling Club, Edmonton
Jocelyn Peterman	Brett Gallant	Alberta	The Glencoe Club, Calgary
Riley Sandham	Brendan Craig	Ontario	Guelph Curling Club, Guelph
Laurie St-Georges	Félix Asselin	Quebec	Glenmore Curling Club, Dollard-des-Ormeaux
Laura Walker	Kirk Muyres	Alberta / Saskatchewan	Sherwood Park Curling Club, Sherwood Park & Wadena Re/Max Curling Club, Wadena
Lauren Wasylkiw	Shane Konings	Ontario	Unionville Curling Club, Unionville, Markham
Lisa Weagle	John Epping	Ontario	Leaside Curling Club, East York, Toronto
Jessica Zheng	Victor Pietrangelo	Ontario	Niagara Falls Curling Club, Niagara Falls

== Round robin standings ==
Final Round Robin Standings

Key
Teams to Playoffs

Pool A	W	L
(Alberta) (Saskatchewan) Walker / Muyres	7	0
(Saskatchewan) Kleiter / Kleiter	5	2
(New Brunswick) (Alberta) Kelly / Tardi	5	2
(Saskatchewan) (Manitoba) Kitz / Stewart	4	3
(Quebec) St-Georges / Asselin	4	3
(New Brunswick) Adams / Robichaud	2	5
(Yukon) Siciliano / Williams	1	6
(Quebec) Laplante / Gibeau	0	7

Pool B	W	L
(Alberta) Papley / van Amsterdam	5	2
(Saskatchewan) Martin / Laycock	5	2
(British Columbia) Cotter / Cotter	4	3
(Alberta) Sluchinski / Sluchinski	4	3
(Nova Scotia) Powers / Saunders	4	3
(Quebec) Cheal / Cheal	2	5
(Quebec) Tremblay / Lanoue	2	5
(Northern Ontario) McCormick / Bonot	2	5

Pool C	W	L
(British Columbia) Reese-Hansen/Chester	6	1
(Ontario) Weagle / Epping	4	3
(Ontario) Sandham / Craig	4	3
(Ontario) Wasylkiw / Konings	4	3
(Ontario) Jones / Laing	3	4
(Saskatchewan) Gamble / Kalthoff	3	4
(Newfoundland and Labrador) Wiseman / Smith	3	4
(Quebec) Gagné / Morissette	1	6

Pool D	W	L
(Manitoba) Lott / Lott	7	0
(Alberta) Peterman / Gallant	5	2
(Ontario) Zheng / Pietrangelo	4	3
(Quebec) Bouchard / Charest	3	4
(Quebec) Gionest / Desjardins	3	4
(Ontario) Kreviazuk / Mathers	3	4
(New Brunswick) (British Columbia) Armstrong / Griffith	3	4
(Prince Edward Island) White / White	0	7

== Round robin results ==
All draws are listed in Atlantic Time (UTC−03:00).

=== Draw 1 ===
Sunday, March 17, 6:00 pm

Sheet A	1	2	3	4	5	6	7	8	Final
(Yukon) Siciliano / Williams	0	0	0	2	0	1	0	X	3
(Saskatchewan) (Manitoba) Kitz / Stewart 🔨	3	2	2	0	1	0	3	X	11

Sheet B	1	2	3	4	5	6	7	8	Final
(Alberta) (Saskatchewan) Walker / Muyres	1	0	3	1	0	1	1	X	7
(Saskatchewan) Kleiter / Kleiter 🔨	0	1	0	0	3	0	0	X	4

Sheet C	1	2	3	4	5	6	7	8	Final
(Alberta) Papley / van Amsterdam	0	0	1	0	2	0	0	2	5
(Nova Scotia) Powers / Saunders 🔨	1	1	0	1	0	2	1	0	6

Sheet D	1	2	3	4	5	6	7	8	Final
(New Brunswick) Adams / Robichaud 🔨	0	2	2	2	3	0	X	X	9
(Quebec) Laplante / Gibeau	1	0	0	0	0	1	X	X	2

Sheet E	1	2	3	4	5	6	7	8	Final
(New Brunswick) (Alberta) Kelly / Tardi 🔨	0	3	1	0	2	0	0	1	7
(Quebec) St-Georges / Asselin	1	0	0	1	0	1	1	0	4

Sheet F	1	2	3	4	5	6	7	8	Final
(Quebec) Tremblay / Lanoue 🔨	0	3	0	0	3	2	0	X	8
(Saskatchewan) Martin / Laycock	1	0	1	1	0	0	1	X	4

Sheet G	1	2	3	4	5	6	7	8	Final
(British Columbia) Cotter / Cotter	0	2	1	0	0	0	3	0	6
(Northern Ontario) McCormick / Bonot 🔨	2	0	0	0	1	1	0	3	7

Sheet H	1	2	3	4	5	6	7	8	Final
(Alberta) Sluchinski / Sluchinski 🔨	0	3	1	3	2	X	X	X	9
(Quebec) Cheal / Cheal	1	0	0	0	0	X	X	X	1

=== Draw 2 ===
Sunday, March 17, 9:00 pm

Sheet A	1	2	3	4	5	6	7	8	Final
(Newfoundland and Labrador) Wiseman / Smith	0	0	3	3	0	2	1	X	9
(Ontario) Sandham / Craig 🔨	1	1	0	0	2	0	0	X	4

Sheet B	1	2	3	4	5	6	7	8	Final
(Ontario) Jones / Laing 🔨	0	0	4	0	0	0	3	0	7
(Quebec) Gagné / Morissette	2	1	0	1	1	1	0	4	10

Sheet C	1	2	3	4	5	6	7	8	Final
(Ontario) Zheng / Pietrangelo	0	0	0	0	0	0	X	X	0
(Manitoba) Lott / Lott 🔨	3	1	1	3	1	1	X	X	10

Sheet D	1	2	3	4	5	6	7	8	Final
(British Columbia) Reese-Hansen / Chester	0	1	0	1	0	4	1	0	7
(Ontario) Wasylkiw / Konings 🔨	2	0	1	0	2	0	0	1	6

Sheet E	1	2	3	4	5	6	7	8	Final
(Saskatchewan) Gamble / Kalthoff	1	1	0	1	0	0	0	3	6
(Ontario) Weagle / Epping 🔨	0	0	1	0	1	2	1	0	5

Sheet F	1	2	3	4	5	6	7	8	9	Final
(Ontario) Kreviazuk / Mathers	0	3	0	2	0	2	0	2	0	9
(Alberta) Peterman / Gallant 🔨	2	0	3	0	3	0	1	0	1	10

Sheet G	1	2	3	4	5	6	7	8	Final
(New Brunswick) (British Columbia) Armstrong / Griffith	1	0	1	0	2	1	0	2	7
(Prince Edward Island) White / White 🔨	0	2	0	2	0	0	2	0	6

Sheet H	1	2	3	4	5	6	7	8	Final
(Quebec) Bouchard / Charest	0	2	1	3	0	1	1	X	8
(Quebec) Gionest / Desjardins 🔨	1	0	0	0	2	0	0	X	3

=== Draw 3 ===
Monday, March 18, 10:00 am

Sheet A	1	2	3	4	5	6	7	8	Final
(Quebec) Tremblay / Lanoue 🔨	1	0	0	0	1	0	1	X	3
(Nova Scotia) Powers / Saunders	0	2	2	1	0	1	0	X	6

Sheet B	1	2	3	4	5	6	7	8	Final
(Quebec) Cheal / Cheal	1	0	3	0	0	1	0	X	5
(British Columbia) Cotter / Cotter	0	1	0	3	1	0	4	X	9

Sheet C	1	2	3	4	5	6	7	8	Final
(Quebec) St-Georges / Asselin	1	2	1	1	1	0	1	X	7
(New Brunswick) Adams / Robichaud 🔨	0	0	0	0	0	1	0	X	1

Sheet D	1	2	3	4	5	6	7	8	Final
(Northern Ontario) McCormick / Bonot	0	1	0	0	0	0	X	X	1
(Alberta) Sluchinski / Sluchinski 🔨	1	0	3	1	1	1	X	X	7

Sheet E	1	2	3	4	5	6	7	8	Final
(Saskatchewan) Martin / Laycock	0	2	0	2	0	4	0	0	8
(Alberta) Papley / van Amsterdam 🔨	3	0	3	0	2	0	2	1	11

Sheet F	1	2	3	4	5	6	7	8	Final
(Saskatchewan) (Manitoba) Kitz / Stewart 🔨	0	2	0	1	0	1	0	0	4
(Saskatchewan) Kleiter / Kleiter	1	0	1	0	1	0	2	1	6

Sheet G	1	2	3	4	5	6	7	8	Final
(Yukon) Siciliano / Williams	0	0	0	0	0	0	X	X	0
(Alberta) (Saskatchewan) Walker / Muyres 🔨	2	1	1	1	2	2	X	X	9

Sheet H	1	2	3	4	5	6	7	8	Final
(Quebec) Laplante / Gibeau	0	0	0	3	0	2	0	X	5
(New Brunswick) (Alberta) Kelly / Tardi 🔨	1	1	1	0	2	0	4	X	9

=== Draw 4 ===
Monday, March 18, 1:00 pm

Sheet A	1	2	3	4	5	6	7	8	Final
(Ontario) Kreviazuk / Mathers	0	0	2	0	1	0	1	X	4
(Manitoba) Lott / Lott 🔨	2	1	0	3	0	2	0	X	8

Sheet B	1	2	3	4	5	6	7	8	Final
(Quebec) Gionest / Desjardins 🔨	0	0	1	1	2	0	1	0	5
(New Brunswick) (British Columbia) Armstrong / Griffith	1	1	0	0	0	1	0	1	4

Sheet C	1	2	3	4	5	6	7	8	Final
(Ontario) Weagle / Epping 🔨	1	0	2	0	1	2	0	X	6
(British Columbia) Reese-Hansen / Chester	0	1	0	2	0	0	1	X	4

Sheet D	1	2	3	4	5	6	7	8	Final
(Prince Edward Island) White / White 🔨	0	1	0	0	1	0	0	X	2
(Quebec) Bouchard / Charest	1	0	1	2	0	2	2	X	8

Sheet E	1	2	3	4	5	6	7	8	Final
(Alberta) Peterman / Gallant 🔨	1	1	0	3	0	2	0	0	7
(Ontario) Zheng / Pietrangelo	0	0	1	0	2	0	2	1	6

Sheet F	1	2	3	4	5	6	7	8	Final
(Ontario) Sandham / Craig 🔨	1	2	0	1	0	2	0	4	10
(Quebec) Gagné / Morissette	0	0	1	0	3	0	1	0	5

Sheet G	1	2	3	4	5	6	7	8	Final
(Newfoundland and Labrador) Wiseman / Smith 🔨	2	0	1	0	1	0	3	0	7
(Ontario) Jones / Laing	0	3	0	4	0	2	0	2	11

Sheet H	1	2	3	4	5	6	7	8	Final
(Ontario) Wasylkiw / Konings	2	0	5	1	1	0	1	X	10
(Saskatchewan) Gamble / Kalthoff 🔨	0	1	0	0	0	4	0	X	5

=== Draw 5 ===
Monday, March 18, 4:00 pm

Sheet A	1	2	3	4	5	6	7	8	Final
(Saskatchewan) Kleiter / Kleiter	0	2	0	1	0	1	0	1	5
(New Brunswick) Adams / Robichaud 🔨	2	0	1	0	1	0	0	0	4

Sheet B	1	2	3	4	5	6	7	8	Final
(Saskatchewan) (Manitoba) Kitz / Stewart 🔨	1	0	0	3	0	2	0	0	6
(New Brunswick) (Alberta) Kelly / Tardi	0	3	1	0	1	0	2	2	9

Sheet C	1	2	3	4	5	6	7	8	Final
(British Columbia) Cotter / Cotter	1	1	0	0	2	0	2	X	6
(Saskatchewan) Martin / Laycock 🔨	0	0	4	3	0	2	0	X	9

Sheet D	1	2	3	4	5	6	7	8	Final
(Alberta) Papley / van Amsterdam	0	1	0	2	3	0	3	X	9
(Quebec) Cheal / Cheal 🔨	1	0	1	0	0	1	0	X	3

Sheet E	1	2	3	4	5	6	7	8	Final
(Quebec) Laplante / Gibeau	0	0	0	0	2	1	0	X	3
(Alberta) (Saskatchewan) Walker / Muyres 🔨	2	2	2	1	0	0	2	X	9

Sheet F	1	2	3	4	5	6	7	8	Final
(Yukon) Siciliano / Williams	0	0	0	0	1	0	X	X	1
(Quebec) St-Georges / Asselin 🔨	4	1	3	2	0	1	X	X	11

Sheet G	1	2	3	4	5	6	7	8	Final
(Nova Scotia) Powers / Saunders	1	0	1	0	1	0	2	0	5
(Alberta) Sluchinski / Sluchinski 🔨	0	1	0	0	0	2	0	1	4

Sheet H	1	2	3	4	5	6	7	8	Final
(Quebec) Tremblay / Lanoue 🔨	1	1	0	0	0	0	3	0	5
(Northern Ontario) McCormick / Bonot	0	0	1	2	1	2	0	1	7

=== Draw 6 ===
Monday, March 18, 7:00 pm

Sheet A	1	2	3	4	5	6	7	8	9	Final
(Quebec) Gagné / Morissette 🔨	0	0	0	2	1	0	1	1	0	5
(British Columbia) Reese-Hansen / Chester	1	1	1	0	0	2	0	0	3	8

Sheet B	1	2	3	4	5	6	7	8	Final
(Ontario) Sandham / Craig 🔨	1	2	0	1	0	0	2	1	7
(Saskatchewan) Gamble / Kalthoff	0	0	1	0	1	1	0	0	3

Sheet C	1	2	3	4	5	6	7	8	Final
(New Brunswick) (British Columbia) Armstrong / Griffith 🔨	1	1	0	1	0	4	0	X	7
(Alberta) Peterman / Gallant	0	0	1	0	1	0	1	X	3

Sheet D	1	2	3	4	5	6	7	8	Final
(Ontario) Zheng / Pietrangelo	2	0	3	0	1	0	2	X	8
(Quebec) Gionest / Desjardins 🔨	0	2	0	2	0	1	0	X	5

Sheet E	1	2	3	4	5	6	7	8	9	Final
(Ontario) Wasylkiw / Konings	1	1	1	0	0	2	0	2	1	8
(Ontario) Jones / Laing 🔨	0	0	0	2	4	0	1	0	0	7

Sheet F	1	2	3	4	5	6	7	8	Final
(Newfoundland and Labrador) Wiseman / Smith	5	2	0	0	4	1	X	X	12
(Ontario) Weagle / Epping	0	0	1	1	0	0	X	X	2

Sheet G	1	2	3	4	5	6	7	8	Final
(Manitoba) Lott / Lott 🔨	0	2	3	0	3	0	4	X	12
(Quebec) Bouchard / Charest	1	0	0	2	0	1	0	X	4

Sheet H	1	2	3	4	5	6	7	8	Final
(Ontario) Kreviazuk / Mathers	0	2	2	0	3	1	X	X	8
(Prince Edward Island) White / White 🔨	1	0	0	1	0	0	X	X	2

=== Draw 7 ===
Tuesday, March 19, 10:00 am

Sheet A	1	2	3	4	5	6	7	8	Final
(Ontario) Zheng / Pietrangelo 🔨	0	1	0	1	0	2	2	0	6
(New Brunswick) (British Columbia) Armstrong / Griffith	2	0	1	0	1	0	0	1	5

Sheet B	1	2	3	4	5	6	7	8	Final
(Quebec) Bouchard / Charest	0	1	1	3	0	0	1	1	7
(Ontario) Kreviazuk / Mathers 🔨	4	0	0	0	1	1	0	0	6

Sheet C	1	2	3	4	5	6	7	8	Final
(Ontario) Jones / Laing 🔨	0	1	0	2	0	2	1	0	6
(Ontario) Sandham / Craig	1	0	1	0	3	0	0	2	7

Sheet D	1	2	3	4	5	6	7	8	Final
(Quebec) Gagné / Morissette 🔨	0	1	0	0	0	1	0	X	2
(Newfoundland and Labrador) Wiseman / Smith	1	0	1	1	2	0	1	X	6

Sheet E	1	2	3	4	5	6	7	8	Final
(British Columbia) Reese-Hansen / Chester 🔨	1	0	0	4	0	1	0	1	7
(Saskatchewan) Gamble / Kalthoff	0	1	1	0	3	0	1	0	6

Sheet F	1	2	3	4	5	6	7	8	Final
(Ontario) Weagle / Epping 🔨	0	4	1	0	1	2	0	1	9
(Ontario) Wasylkiw / Konings	1	0	0	4	0	0	3	0	8

Sheet G	1	2	3	4	5	6	7	8	Final
(Prince Edward Island) White / White	2	0	1	0	1	0	1	0	5
(Alberta) Peterman / Gallant 🔨	0	1	0	1	0	3	0	1	6

Sheet H	1	2	3	4	5	6	7	8	Final
(Quebec) Gionest / Desjardins	0	1	0	0	0	0	X	X	1
(Manitoba) Lott / Lott 🔨	3	0	5	2	2	1	X	X	13

=== Draw 8 ===
Tuesday, March 19, 1:00 pm

Sheet A	1	2	3	4	5	6	7	8	9	Final
(Alberta) Papley / van Amsterdam	0	1	0	2	0	1	1	1	1	7
(British Columbia) Cotter / Cotter 🔨	3	0	1	0	2	0	0	0	0	6

Sheet B	1	2	3	4	5	6	7	8	Final
(Alberta) Sluchinski / Sluchinski	1	2	0	2	0	4	X	X	9
(Quebec) Tremblay / Lanoue 🔨	0	0	1	0	2	0	X	X	3

Sheet C	1	2	3	4	5	6	7	8	Final
(Alberta) (Saskatchewan) Walker / Muyres 🔨	1	0	2	3	0	0	0	1	7
(Saskatchewan) (Manitoba) Kitz / Stewart	0	2	0	0	1	1	1	0	5

Sheet D	1	2	3	4	5	6	7	8	Final
(Saskatchewan) Kleiter / Kleiter 🔨	0	2	2	0	0	2	0	X	6
(Yukon) Siciliano / Williams	1	0	0	1	1	0	1	X	4

Sheet E	1	2	3	4	5	6	7	8	Final
(New Brunswick) Adams / Robichaud 🔨	1	1	0	0	0	1	1	0	4
(New Brunswick) (Alberta) Kelly / Tardi	0	0	1	1	2	0	0	2	6

Sheet F	1	2	3	4	5	6	7	8	Final
(Quebec) St-Georges / Asselin 🔨	2	2	1	0	1	0	3	X	9
(Quebec) Laplante / Gibeau	0	0	0	2	0	1	0	X	3

Sheet G	1	2	3	4	5	6	7	8	Final
(Northern Ontario) McCormick / Bonot	0	2	0	0	2	0	1	0	5
(Saskatchewan) Martin / Laycock 🔨	1	0	1	3	0	1	0	1	7

Sheet H	1	2	3	4	5	6	7	8	Final
(Quebec) Cheal / Cheal	1	0	0	1	1	0	3	2	8
(Nova Scotia) Powers / Saunders 🔨	0	2	1	0	0	3	0	0	6

=== Draw 9 ===
Tuesday, March 19, 4:00 pm

Sheet A	1	2	3	4	5	6	7	8	9	Final
(Ontario) Jones / Laing	1	0	0	4	0	0	1	1	1	8
(Ontario) Weagle / Epping 🔨	0	3	1	0	1	2	0	0	0	7

Sheet B	1	2	3	4	5	6	7	8	Final
(Newfoundland and Labrador) Wiseman / Smith 🔨	2	0	1	0	0	1	0	0	4
(Ontario) Wasylkiw / Konings	0	1	0	1	1	0	1	1	5

Sheet C	1	2	3	4	5	6	7	8	Final
(Alberta) Peterman / Gallant	0	0	1	1	1	1	0	1	5
(Quebec) Gionest / Desjardins 🔨	2	1	0	0	0	0	1	0	4

Sheet D	1	2	3	4	5	6	7	8	9	Final
(New Brunswick) (British Columbia) Armstrong / Griffith 🔨	0	1	2	0	2	0	0	1	0	6
(Ontario) Kreviazuk / Mathers	1	0	0	2	0	2	1	0	1	7

Sheet E	1	2	3	4	5	6	7	8	Final
(Manitoba) Lott / Lott 🔨	1	1	0	2	0	1	0	1	6
(Prince Edward Island) White / White	0	0	1	0	1	0	3	0	5

Sheet F	1	2	3	4	5	6	7	8	Final
(Ontario) Zheng / Pietrangelo	0	1	0	3	2	0	0	1	7
(Quebec) Bouchard / Charest 🔨	1	0	1	0	0	1	3	0	6

Sheet G	1	2	3	4	5	6	7	8	Final
(Ontario) Sandham / Craig	0	0	1	2	0	1	0	2	6
(British Columbia) Reese-Hansen / Chester 🔨	3	1	0	0	2	0	2	0	8

Sheet H	1	2	3	4	5	6	7	8	Final
(Saskatchewan) Gamble / Kalthoff	1	1	0	1	0	2	0	2	7
(Quebec) Gagné / Morissette 🔨	0	0	1	0	3	0	2	0	6

=== Draw 10 ===
Tuesday, March 19, 7:00 pm

Sheet A	1	2	3	4	5	6	7	8	Final
(Alberta) (Saskatchewan) Walker / Muyres 🔨	2	2	0	2	0	3	X	X	9
(Quebec) St-Georges / Asselin	0	0	1	0	2	0	X	X	3

Sheet B	1	2	3	4	5	6	7	8	Final
(Yukon) Siciliano / Williams 🔨	3	1	0	1	0	0	3	X	8
(Quebec) Laplante / Gibeau	0	0	2	0	1	1	0	X	4

Sheet C	1	2	3	4	5	6	7	8	Final
(Saskatchewan) Martin / Laycock	0	1	0	2	1	0	2	X	6
(Quebec) Cheal / Cheal 🔨	1	0	1	0	0	1	0	X	3

Sheet D	1	2	3	4	5	6	7	8	Final
(British Columbia) Cotter / Cotter 🔨	2	0	2	2	3	0	1	X	10
(Quebec) Tremblay / Lanoue	0	3	0	0	0	2	0	X	5

Sheet E	1	2	3	4	5	6	7	8	9	Final
(Nova Scotia) Powers / Saunders 🔨	1	1	0	0	1	1	1	0	1	6
(Northern Ontario) McCormick / Bonot	0	0	3	1	0	0	0	1	0	5

Sheet F	1	2	3	4	5	6	7	8	9	Final
(Alberta) Papley / van Amsterdam	1	0	2	1	0	0	0	1	0	5
(Alberta) Sluchinski / Sluchinski 🔨	0	1	0	0	2	1	1	0	1	6

Sheet G	1	2	3	4	5	6	7	8	Final
(Saskatchewan) (Manitoba) Kitz / Stewart 🔨	0	0	4	0	1	0	4	1	10
(New Brunswick) Adams / Robichaud	1	2	0	2	0	3	0	0	8

Sheet H	1	2	3	4	5	6	7	8	Final
(New Brunswick) (Alberta) Kelly / Tardi	0	2	0	1	1	0	X	X	4
(Saskatchewan) Kleiter / Kleiter 🔨	5	0	2	0	0	4	X	X	11

=== Draw 11 ===
Wednesday, March 20, 10:00 am

Sheet A	1	2	3	4	5	6	7	8	Final
(Prince Edward Island) White / White	0	1	0	0	2	0	0	X	3
(Quebec) Gionest / Desjardins 🔨	4	0	1	1	0	1	2	X	9

Sheet B	1	2	3	4	5	6	7	8	Final
(Alberta) Peterman / Gallant	0	1	1	0	2	1	0	0	5
(Manitoba) Lott / Lott 🔨	3	0	0	1	0	0	3	1	8

Sheet C	1	2	3	4	5	6	7	8	Final
(Quebec) Gagné / Morissette	0	2	0	0	1	0	1	0	4
(Ontario) Weagle / Epping 🔨	2	0	1	1	0	1	0	1	6

Sheet D	1	2	3	4	5	6	7	8	Final
(Ontario) Wasylkiw / Konings	0	2	1	0	1	0	2	0	6
(Ontario) Sandham / Craig 🔨	3	0	0	1	0	3	0	1	8

Sheet E	1	2	3	4	5	6	7	8	Final
(New Brunswick) (British Columbia) Armstrong / Griffith 🔨	0	2	3	1	0	2	0	X	8
(Quebec) Bouchard / Charest	1	0	0	0	2	0	1	X	4

Sheet F	1	2	3	4	5	6	7	8	Final
(Saskatchewan) Gamble / Kalthoff 🔨	2	0	1	0	1	0	1	0	5
(Ontario) Jones / Laing	0	2	0	1	0	1	0	2	6

Sheet G	1	2	3	4	5	6	7	8	Final
(Ontario) Kreviazuk / Mathers 🔨	1	0	2	0	2	0	3	0	8
(Ontario) Zheng / Pietrangelo	0	2	0	2	0	1	0	2	7

Sheet H	1	2	3	4	5	6	7	8	Final
(British Columbia) Reese-Hansen / Chester 🔨	1	2	1	1	1	2	X	X	8
(Newfoundland and Labrador) Wiseman / Smith	0	0	0	0	0	0	X	X	0

=== Draw 12 ===
Wednesday, March 20, 1:00 pm

Sheet A	1	2	3	4	5	6	7	8	9	Final
(Northern Ontario) McCormick / Bonot	0	2	0	1	0	3	0	1	0	7
(Quebec) Cheal / Cheal 🔨	4	0	1	0	1	0	1	0	1	8

Sheet B	1	2	3	4	5	6	7	8	Final
(Saskatchewan) Martin / Laycock	0	3	2	1	0	0	0	1	7
(Nova Scotia) Powers / Saunders 🔨	2	0	0	0	1	1	2	0	6

Sheet C	1	2	3	4	5	6	7	8	Final
(Saskatchewan) Kleiter / Kleiter	0	0	2	0	1	0	1	0	4
(Quebec) St-Georges / Asselin 🔨	1	1	0	1	0	1	0	1	5

Sheet D	1	2	3	4	5	6	7	8	Final
(Quebec) Laplante / Gibeau 🔨	2	0	0	0	0	2	X	X	4
(Saskatchewan) (Manitoba) Kitz / Stewart	0	2	2	3	2	0	X	X	9

Sheet E	1	2	3	4	5	6	7	8	Final
(British Columbia) Cotter / Cotter	0	2	1	2	0	0	2	X	7
(Alberta) Sluchinski / Sluchinski 🔨	1	0	0	0	1	1	0	X	3

Sheet F	1	2	3	4	5	6	7	8	Final
(New Brunswick) (Alberta) Kelly / Tardi	0	1	0	2	0	2	0	2	7
(Alberta) (Saskatchewan) Walker / Muyres 🔨	1	0	1	0	5	0	1	0	8

Sheet G	1	2	3	4	5	6	7	8	Final
(Quebec) Tremblay / Lanoue	0	3	0	0	0	1	0	X	4
(Alberta) Papley / van Amsterdam 🔨	3	0	1	1	1	0	1	X	7

Sheet H	1	2	3	4	5	6	7	8	Final
(New Brunswick) Adams / Robichaud 🔨	1	2	2	1	0	2	X	X	8
(Yukon) Siciliano / Williams	0	0	0	0	1	0	X	X	1

=== Draw 13 ===
Wednesday, March 20, 4:00 pm

Sheet A	1	2	3	4	5	6	7	8	Final
(Quebec) Bouchard / Charest	0	2	0	0	0	0	2	X	4
(Alberta) Peterman / Gallant 🔨	1	0	1	1	1	1	0	X	5

Sheet B	1	2	3	4	5	6	7	8	Final
(Prince Edward Island) White / White	2	1	1	0	0	1	0	X	5
(Ontario) Zheng / Pietrangelo 🔨	0	0	0	2	4	0	1	X	7

Sheet C	1	2	3	4	5	6	7	8	Final
(British Columbia) Reese-Hansen / Chester	1	0	1	0	1	1	1	0	5
(Ontario) Jones / Laing 🔨	0	1	0	1	0	0	0	2	4

Sheet D	1	2	3	4	5	6	7	8	Final
(Newfoundland and Labrador) Wiseman / Smith	0	0	0	0	0	0	X	X	0
(Saskatchewan) Gamble / Kalthoff 🔨	2	1	3	1	1	1	X	X	9

Sheet E	1	2	3	4	5	6	7	8	Final
(Quebec) Gionest / Desjardins 🔨	2	0	0	2	0	0	3	1	8
(Ontario) Kreviazuk / Mathers	0	1	0	0	2	1	0	0	4

Sheet F	1	2	3	4	5	6	7	8	Final
(Manitoba) Lott / Lott 🔨	2	0	0	1	1	0	4	X	8
(New Brunswick) (British Columbia) Armstrong / Griffith	0	1	1	0	0	1	0	X	3

Sheet G	1	2	3	4	5	6	7	8	Final
(Quebec) Gagné / Morissette	0	3	0	1	1	1	0	0	6
(Ontario) Wasylkiw / Konings 🔨	1	0	4	0	0	0	1	1	7

Sheet H	1	2	3	4	5	6	7	8	Final
(Ontario) Weagle / Epping	0	5	0	5	0	1	0	X	11
(Ontario) Sandham / Craig 🔨	3	0	1	0	1	0	2	X	7

=== Draw 14 ===
Wednesday, March 20, 7:00 pm

Sheet A	1	2	3	4	5	6	7	8	Final
(Alberta) Sluchinski / Sluchinski 🔨	0	2	0	0	1	0	2	X	5
(Saskatchewan) Martin / Laycock	2	0	2	2	0	1	0	X	7

Sheet B	1	2	3	4	5	6	7	8	Final
(Northern Ontario) McCormick / Bonot 🔨	1	0	1	0	5	0	0	0	7
(Alberta) Papley / van Amsterdam	0	2	0	2	0	2	1	2	9

Sheet C	1	2	3	4	5	6	7	8	Final
(New Brunswick) Adams / Robichaud 🔨	0	1	0	1	0	0	0	X	2
(Alberta) (Saskatchewan) Walker / Muyres	2	0	2	0	2	1	2	X	9

Sheet D	1	2	3	4	5	6	7	8	Final
(Yukon) Siciliano / Williams 🔨	0	0	2	0	1	1	1	X	5
(New Brunswick) (Alberta) Kelly / Tardi	1	3	0	3	0	0	0	X	7

Sheet E	1	2	3	4	5	6	7	8	Final
(Quebec) Cheal / Cheal	2	1	0	0	1	0	1	0	5
(Quebec) Tremblay / Lanoue 🔨	0	0	4	1	0	1	0	1	7

Sheet F	1	2	3	4	5	6	7	8	Final
(Nova Scotia) Powers / Saunders	0	1	0	1	0	2	1	0	5
(British Columbia) Cotter / Cotter 🔨	2	0	2	0	1	0	0	1	6

Sheet G	1	2	3	4	5	6	7	8	Final
(Saskatchewan) Kleiter / Kleiter 🔨	1	2	1	2	1	2	X	X	9
(Quebec) Laplante / Gibeau	0	0	0	0	0	0	X	X	0

Sheet H	1	2	3	4	5	6	7	8	Final
(Quebec) St-Georges / Asselin 🔨	5	0	1	0	1	0	2	0	9
(Saskatchewan) (Manitoba) Kitz / Stewart	0	3	0	1	0	3	0	3	10

== Playoffs ==
Qualification Games
8	(Saskatchewan) Martin / Laycock	8
9	(Ontario) Weagle / Epping	6
5	(Alberta) Peterman / Gallant	7
12	(Ontario) Sandham / Craig	6
7	(New Brunswick) (Alberta) Kelly / Tardi	4
10	(Alberta) Sluchinski / Sluchinski	6
6	(Saskatchewan) Kleiter / Kleiter	7
11	(British Columbia) Cotter / Cotter	3

Quarterfinals
1	(Manitoba) Lott / Lott	11
8	(Saskatchewan) Martin / Laycock	3
4	(Alberta) Papley / van Amsterdam	5
5	(Alberta) Peterman / Gallant	7
2	(Alberta) (Saskatchewan) Walker / Muyres	7
10	(Alberta) Sluchinski / Sluchinski	6
3	(British Columbia) Reese-Hansen / Chester	5
6	(Saskatchewan) Kleiter / Kleiter	7

Semifinals
1	(Manitoba) Lott / Lott	8
5	(Alberta) Peterman / Gallant	4
2	(Alberta) (Saskatchewan) Walker / Muyres	8
6	(Saskatchewan) Kleiter / Kleiter	6

Final
1	(Manitoba) Lott / Lott	7
2	(Alberta) (Saskatchewan) Walker / Muyres	5
Bronze medal game
5	(Alberta) Peterman / Gallant	6
6	(Saskatchewan) Kleiter / Kleiter	3

=== Qualification games ===
Thursday, March 21, 1:00 pm

Sheet B	1	2	3	4	5	6	7	8	Final
(Saskatchewan) Martin / Laycock 🔨	2	0	0	0	2	1	0	3	8
(Ontario) Weagle / Epping	0	2	1	1	0	0	2	0	6

Sheet C	1	2	3	4	5	6	7	8	Final
(Saskatchewan) Kleiter / Kleiter 🔨	0	1	0	4	1	1	0	X	7
(British Columbia) Cotter / Cotter	1	0	1	0	0	0	1	X	3

Sheet D	1	2	3	4	5	6	7	8	Final
(New Brunswick) (Alberta) Kelly / Tardi 🔨	0	0	0	0	2	1	0	1	4
(Alberta) Sluchinski / Sluchinski	1	1	2	1	0	0	1	0	6

Sheet E	1	2	3	4	5	6	7	8	9	Final
(Alberta) Peterman / Gallant 🔨	2	1	1	1	0	0	1	0	1	7
(Ontario) Sandham / Craig	0	0	0	0	3	1	0	2	0	6

=== Quarterfinals ===
Thursday, March 21, 7:00 pm

Sheet B	1	2	3	4	5	6	7	8	Final
(Alberta) Papley / van Amsterdam 🔨	0	0	1	0	0	1	0	3	5
(Alberta) Peterman / Gallant	2	1	0	2	1	0	1	0	7

Sheet C	1	2	3	4	5	6	7	8	Final
(Alberta) (Saskatchewan) Walker / Muyres 🔨	1	0	3	0	1	1	0	1	7
(Alberta) Sluchinski / Sluchinski	0	2	0	3	0	0	1	0	6

Sheet D	1	2	3	4	5	6	7	8	Final
(Manitoba) Lott / Lott 🔨	1	0	4	0	3	3	X	X	11
(Saskatchewan) Martin / Laycock	0	2	0	1	0	0	X	X	3

Sheet E	1	2	3	4	5	6	7	8	Final
(British Columbia) Reese-Hansen / Chester 🔨	1	0	0	1	0	2	0	1	5
(Saskatchewan) Kleiter / Kleiter	0	1	2	0	1	0	3	0	7

=== Semifinals ===
Friday, March 22, 9:00 am

Sheet C	1	2	3	4	5	6	7	8	Final
(Manitoba) Lott / Lott 🔨	3	0	0	0	0	2	1	2	8
(Alberta) Peterman / Gallant	0	1	1	1	1	0	0	0	4

Sheet D	1	2	3	4	5	6	7	8	Final
(Alberta) (Saskatchewan) Walker / Muyres 🔨	0	2	1	2	0	2	0	1	8
(Saskatchewan) Kleiter / Kleiter	1	0	0	0	2	0	3	0	6

=== Bronze medal game ===
Friday, March 22, 12:15 pm

Sheet B	1	2	3	4	5	6	7	8	Final
(Alberta) Peterman / Gallant 🔨	0	1	0	2	0	1	1	1	6
(Saskatchewan) Kleiter / Kleiter	1	0	1	0	1	0	0	0	3

=== Final ===
Friday, March 22, 1:00 pm

Sheet C	1	2	3	4	5	6	7	8	Final
(Manitoba) Lott / Lott	0	0	3	0	1	0	2	1	7
(Alberta) (Saskatchewan) Walker / Muyres	1	2	0	1	0	1	0	0	5
