= Colton Lott =

Canadian curler (born 1995)

- Curler
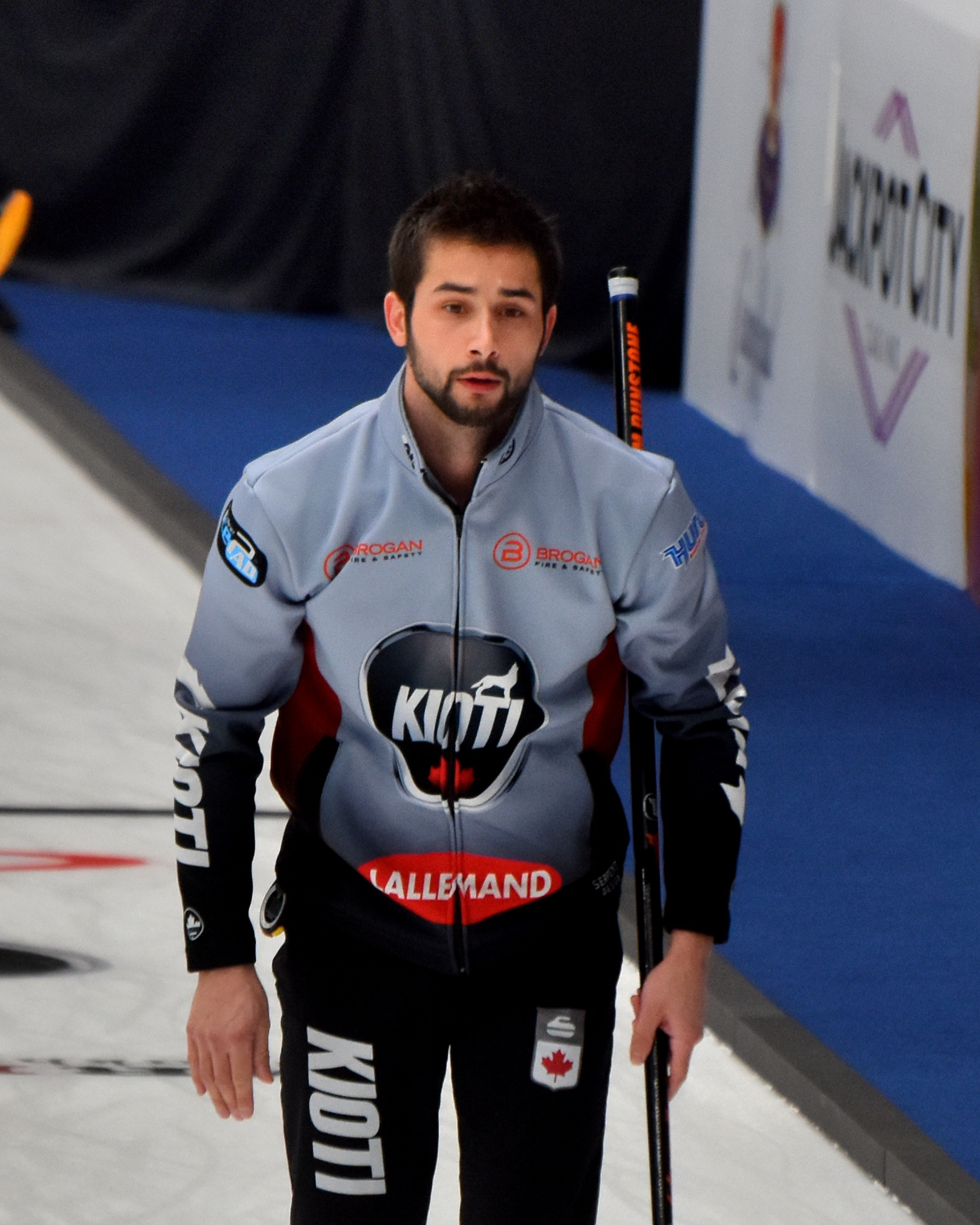
- Lott at the 2026 Players' Championship in Steinbach, Manitoba.
- Born: July 21, 1995 (age 31); Selkirk, Manitoba, Canada

Team
- Curling club: Gimli CC, Gimli & Winnipeg Beach CC, Winnipeg Beach, MB
- Skip: Matt Dunstone
- Third: Colton Lott
- Second: Mark Nichols
- Lead: Ryan Harnden
- Mixed doubles partner: Kadriana Lott

Curling career
- Member Association: Manitoba
- Brier: 5 (2022, 2023, 2024, 2025, 2026)
- World Championship: 1 (2026)
- World Mixed Doubles Championship: 2 (2024, 2026)
- Top CTRS ranking: 2nd (2024–25, 2025–26)
- Grand Slam victories: 2 (2025 Masters (Sept.), 2026 Masters)
Medal record
Curling
Representing Canada
World Championships
Silver medal – second place	2026 Ogden
World Mixed Doubles Championships
Bronze medal – third place	2026 Geneva
World Junior Championships
Gold medal – first place	2015 Tallinn
Bronze medal – third place	2013 Sochi
Bronze medal – third place	2016 Copenhagen
Representing Manitoba
Canadian Olympic Curling Trials
Silver medal – second place	2025 Halifax
The Brier
Gold medal – first place	2026 St. John's
Silver medal – second place	2023 London
Silver medal – second place	2025 Kelowna
Canadian Mixed Doubles Championships
Gold medal – first place	2024 Fredericton
Gold medal – first place	2025 Summerside
Silver medal – second place	2018 Leduc
Silver medal – second place	2021 Calgary
Bronze medal – third place	2019 Fredericton
Canada Games
Bronze medal – third place	2011 Halifax

Colton Lott (born July 21, 1995) is a Canadian curler. He currently plays third on Team Matt Dunstone, and also curls with his wife, Kadriana Lott in mixed doubles. He won his first national men's championship with Team Dunstone at the 2026 Montana's Brier. With Kadriana Lott, he is a two-time national mixed doubles champion, winning in 2024 and 2025. Lott has two Grand Slam titles, winning the Masters in 2025 and 2026.

== Career ==
=== Juniors ===
Lott's first curling success came with representing Manitoba at the 2011 Canada Winter Games, where he won a bronze medal, playing third for the team, which was skipped by Kyle Doering. This same team won the Manitoba Junior championship in 2012, and represented the province at the 2012 Canadian Junior Curling Championships. There, the team posted a 9–3 round robin record, won a tiebreaker, and then settled for the bronze medal, after losing to Northern Ontario in the semifinal. Lott won the 2013 Manitoba juniors playing third for Team Matt Dunstone. The rink would go on to win the 2013 Canadian Junior Curling Championships, and represented Canada at the 2013 World Junior Curling Championships. There, the team went 7–2 in the round robin, before losing both of their playoff matches. They rebounded in the bronze medal game, beating Sweden to pick up that medal. Lott was invited to play as Team Canada's alternate at the 2015 World Junior Curling Championships, on a team skipped by Braden Calvert. The team would take home the gold medal, but Lott would not play in any games. The Dunstone rink returned to the Canadian Juniors in 2016 after winning the 2016 Manitoba juniors. There, the team won their second Canadian Junior Championship, and would again represent Canada, this time at the 2016 World Juniors. The team again finished 7–2 in the round robin, lost their lone playoff game to Switzerland, but rebounded to win the bronze medal game against the same Swiss team.

=== Men's ===
While still a junior, Lott played men's curling as well. He played for Team Jason Gunnlaugson at the 2015 Safeway Championship, his first men's provincial championship. At the 2016 Manitoba championship, he played with Dunstone, losing in the final to Mike McEwen. Had they won the event, they would've declined their berth into the Brier as it conflicted with the 2016 World Juniors. On the World Curling Tour, Team Dunstone won the 2015 Bernick's Miller Lite Open.

After juniors, Dunstone left the team and was replaced as skip by Gunnlaugson for the 2016-17 curling season. The team played in the 2017 Manitoba provincials, losing in the 3 vs. 4 game. The next season, Gunnlaugson was replaced by Pat Simmons as the team's skip. They played in the 2017 Canadian Olympic Pre-Trials, where they went 2–4. The team played in three Grand Slam events that season, making it to the quarterfinals of the 2017 Tour Challenge. At the 2018 Manitoba provincials, the team failed to make the playoffs. After the season, Simmons retired from competitive curling and was replaced as skip by his brother, Tanner Lott. During the 2018–19 season with his brother, Tanner, the team won two Tour events, the Mother Club Fall Curling Classic and the KKP Classic. For the 2019–20 season, Lott would then join Tanner Horgan at third, with Kyle Doering at second and his brother, Tanner, at lead. They won two Tour events, the Manitoba Curling Tour Classic and the DeKalb Superspiel. Lott would skip his own team for the 2021–22 season, consisting of his brother, Tanner, at third, Kyle Doering at second, and Emerson Klimpke at lead. The team qualified for the 2022 Manitoba provincials, and went undefeated until losing the final to Mike McEwen.

Lott would next reunite with junior teammate, Matt Dunstone joining the team as a second, with B. J. Neufeld as third and Ryan Harnden at lead. In their first year the team would make it all the way to the final of the 2023 Tim Hortons Brier, losing to Brad Gushue. The following year, the team again made the playoffs at the Brier, but lost out to Mike McEwen and did not medal. Following this, the team made a change the next year with Lott moving back up to third. With the lineup change, the team again made the final of 2025 Montana's Brier, but lost to Brad Jacobs in the final.

The next year started well, with Lott winning his first Grand Slam event at the 2025 Masters in September. Despite the strong start to the year, the team met disappointment again when they finished as runner-ups to Jacobs in the Olympic trials. After this low point, the team failed to qualify for the next two Grand Slam events but would regroup before the 2026 Montana's Brier. The team performed well but lost twice to Koe in the event. In the semi-finals the team finally beat Jacobs to avenge their previous notable losses and beat Koe in the final 6–3, after losing to him twice earlier in the bonspiel. Lott made several highlight shots in the playoffs and was named a first team all-star for his efforts. Following the long-awaited Brier victory, he later told press in Winnipeg that "the main goal has always been to get out of Manitoba, and then to be at the Brier, and then to step up that goal to winning the Brier. And having two previous finals in ’23 and last year where we came up short, there’s no words to describe how great this feels."

=== Mixed doubles ===
Lott has found some success playing mixed doubles with partner Kadriana Lott. The pair won the 2018 Manitoba Mixed Doubles championship and played in the 2018 Canadian Mixed Doubles Curling Championship, where they went all the way to the final before losing to Laura Crocker and Kirk Muyres. They represented Canada in the 2018–19 Curling World Cup third leg, winning the event against Norway's Kristin Skaslien and Thomas Ulsrud. Lott and his wife won the 2024 Canadian Mixed Doubles Curling Championship, and represented Canada at the 2024 World Mixed Doubles Curling Championship. At the Worlds, the team finished 8–1 after round robin play, but lost to Estonia's Marie Kaldvee and Harri Lill in the Qualification Round, finishing 5th.

By virtue of their 2024 Canadian Championship title, Lott and Lott qualified for the 2025 Canadian Mixed Doubles Curling Olympic Trials, where the team had a disappointing 4–3 record, missing the playoffs. However, they would rebound by winning the 2025 Canadian Mixed Doubles Curling Championship over Marlee Powers and Luke Saunders 9–8 in the final, qualifying them to represent Canada at the 2026 World Mixed Doubles Curling Championship. There, they would finish round robin play with an 8–1 record, winning their pool and earning a spot in the semifinals. After losing to Sweden in the semifinals, they would rebound to win bronze, beating Italy's Stefania Constantini and Amos Mosaner 11–3 in the bronze medal game.

== Personal life ==
Lott is a carpenter at My Windows Guy Ltd. He is married to his mixed doubles partner, Kadriana Lott. His brother, Tanner Lott, is also a curler. As of 2024, he lives in Winnipeg Beach, Manitoba.

== Grand Slam record ==
Key
C	Champion
F	Lost in Final
SF	Lost in Semifinal
QF	Lost in Quarterfinals
R16	Lost in the round of 16
Q	Did not advance to playoffs
T2	Played in Tier 2 event
DNP	Did not participate in event
N/A	Not a Grand Slam event that season

Event	2022–23	2023–24	2024–25	2025–26	2026–27
Invitational	F	QF	SF	F	QF
Masters	Q	QF	SF	C	C
National	SF	Q	Q	F	
Open	QF	QF	QF	Q	
Players'	QF	Q	SF	Q	
Champions Cup	SF	N/A	N/A	N/A	N/A

== Teams ==
Season	Skip	Third	Second	Lead
2011–12	Kyle Doering	Colton Lott	Derek Oryniak	Lucas Van Den Bosch
2012–13	Matt Dunstone	Colton Lott	Daniel Grant	Brendan MacCuish
2013–14	Matt Dunstone	Colton Lott	Daniel Grant	Brendan MacCuish
2014–15	Matt Dunstone	Colton Lott	Kyle Doering	Rob Gordon
2015–16	Matt Dunstone	Colton Lott	Kyle Doering	Rob Gordon
2016–17	Jason Gunnlaugson	Colton Lott	Kyle Doering	Rob Gordon
2017–18	Pat Simmons	Colton Lott	Kyle Doering	Rob Gordon
2018–19	Tanner Lott	Colton Lott	Kennedy Bird	Wade Ford
2019–20	Tanner Horgan	Colton Lott	Kyle Doering	Tanner Lott
2020–21	Tanner Horgan	Colton Lott	Kyle Doering	Tanner Lott
2021–22 (Sept.–Nov.)	Pat Simmons	Colton Lott	Kyle Doering	Tanner Lott
2021–22 (Dec.–Apr.)	Colton Lott	Tanner Lott	Kyle Doering	Emerson Klimpke
2022–23	Matt Dunstone	B. J. Neufeld	Colton Lott	Ryan Harnden
2023–24	Matt Dunstone	B. J. Neufeld	Colton Lott	Ryan Harnden
2024–25 (Sept.–Oct.)	Matt Dunstone	B. J. Neufeld	Colton Lott	Ryan Harnden
2024–25 (Dec.–Apr.)	Matt Dunstone	Colton Lott	E. J. Harnden	Ryan Harnden
2025–26	Matt Dunstone	Colton Lott	E. J. Harnden	Ryan Harnden
2026–27	Matt Dunstone	Colton Lott	Mark Nichols	Ryan Harnden

== Awards ==
- Brier: First Team All-Star, Third - 2026
