= Jaelyn Cotter =

Canadian curler

- Curler
- Born: March 3, 2000 (age 26); Kamloops, British Columbia

Team
- Curling club: Vernon CC, Vernon, BC
- Skip: Kaila Buchy
- Third: Jaelyn Cotter
- Second: Elizabeth Bowles
- Lead: Hannah Lindner
- Mixed doubles partner: Jim Cotter

Curling career
- Member Association: British Columbia
- Hearts: 1 (2024)
- Top CTRS ranking: 74th (2021–22)

Jaelyn Cotter (born March 3, 2000) is a Canadian curler from Vernon, British Columbia. She currently plays third on Team Kaila Buchy. She also plays mixed doubles with her father Jim Cotter.

== Career ==
=== Juniors ===
In 2018, Cotter skipped her team of Kalia Buchy, Katelyn McGillivray and Cassidy Schwaerzle to victory at the BC U18 Championship. This qualified the team for the 2018 Canadian U18 Curling Championships in Saint Andrews, New Brunswick. There, the team finished 3–3 in the round robin, just enough to reach the double knockout round. They then beat Alberta before losing consecutive games to Saskatchewan and Nova Scotia, eliminating them in fifth place. Two years later, the team, now led by Buchy with Cotter playing third, won the BC Junior Championship, defeating Jensen Taylor 8–6 in the final. This sent them to the 2020 Canadian Junior Curling Championships where they failed to reach the championship round, finishing in tenth with a 5–4 record.

=== Women's ===
Having aged out of juniors before the rest of her team, Cotter continued to play in women's events with Team Buchy. In 2021, the team won their first World Curling Tour title at the Kelowna Double Cash, defeating Mary-Anne Arsenault's rink 7–6 in the final. The following season, they had two playoff finishes, reaching the semifinals of the Kamloops Crown of Curling and the quarterfinals of the Driving Force Decks Int'l Abbotsford Cashspiel. They were unable to qualify for the 2023 British Columbia Scotties Tournament of Hearts, however, going 0–3 in the open qualifier.

In 2024, Cotter competed in her first Canadian women's championship as alternate for the Corryn Brown rink who earned a wildcard spot. At the 2024 Scotties Tournament of Hearts in Calgary, the team finished with a 4–4 record after dropping their final round robin game to Alberta's Selena Sturmay. This created a five-way tie for third with Manitoba, Northern Ontario, Saskatchewan and Quebec. With tiebreaker games abolished and the first tiebreaker (which was head-to-head between all tied teams) tied as well at 2–2, cumulative last stone draw distance between all the teams was used to decide who would make the playoffs. The Brown rink finished with a total of 466.9 but would miss the playoffs as the Kaitlyn Lawes rink finished first with a 231.6.

=== Mixed doubles ===
Cotter played mixed doubles with her father Jim for the first time at the 2016 BC Mixed Doubles Championship. Only entering the event as a warmup for the BC Winter Games, the pair got on a roll, eventually winning the provincial title. Representing British Columbia at the 2016 Canadian Mixed Doubles Curling Trials, the father and daughter pair finished with a respectable 4–3 record, just one game short of the playoff round. The following year, the duo were given an open entry spot to the 2017 Canadian Mixed Doubles Curling Championship. After again finishing 4–3 in the preliminary round, they lost in a tiebreaker to Kim and Wayne Tuck and were eliminated.

The Cotter's continued playing doubles together for the next few years. In 2022, they reached their first final at the Nufloors Vernon MD Curling Classic where they lost to Alyssa Kyllo and Tyrel Griffith. They followed this up with a semifinal finish at the Aly Jenkins Memorial, losing out once again to Griffith and Nancy Martin. The next season, the pair made it to another final at the Chilliwack Championship, dropping an 8–3 decision to Estonia's Marie Kaldvee and Harri Lill. Despite again failing to win the provincial championship, the pairs consistent playoff appearances in seven of their nine events earned them enough points to qualify for their third Canadian Mixed Doubles Championship. In Fredericton, the Cotter's reached the playoffs for the first time with a 4–3 record, going on to lose 7–3 in the round of 12 to Madison and Rylan Kleiter. Still, their strong tour season ranked them fifteenth in the world at the conclusion of the 2023–24 season.

During the 2024–25 season, Jaelyn and Jim played in all three qualifiers for the 2025 Canadian Mixed Doubles Curling Olympic Trials, however, were unsuccessful in earning a direct berth. However, thanks to the points they accumulated from the previous two seasons, they earned the sixteenth and final spot into the Olympic Trials.

== Personal life ==
Cotter is currently enrolled in archeology, anthropology and environmental studies at the University of British Columbia Okanagan. Her father is nine-time BC Men's champion Jim Cotter.

== Teams ==
Season	Skip	Third	Second	Lead
2014–15	Winter Harvey	Jaelyn Cotter	Megan McGillivray	Cassidy Schwaerzle
2015–16	Winter Harvey	Jaelyn Cotter	Megan McGillivray	Cassidy Schwaerzle
2016–17	Megan McGillivray	Jaelyn Cotter	Katelyn McGillivray	Cassidy Schwaerzle
2017–18	Jaelyn Cotter	Kalia Buchy	Katelyn McGillivray	Cassidy Schwaerzle
2018–19	Megan McGillivray	Jaelyn Cotter	Katelyn McGillivray	Cassidy Schwaerzle
2019–20	Kalia Buchy	Jaelyn Cotter	Katelyn McGillivray	Cassidy Schwaerzle
2021–22	Kalia Buchy	Jaelyn Cotter	Katelyn McGillivray	Hannah Lindner
2022–23	Kalia Buchy	Katelyn McGillivray	Jaelyn Cotter	Hannah Lindner
2026–27	Kalia Buchy	Jaelyn Cotter	Elizabeth Bowles	Hannah Lindner
