= 2025 Canadian Mixed Doubles Curling Olympic Trials =

- Host city: Liverpool, Nova Scotia
- Arena: Queens Place Emera Centre
- Dates: December 30, 2024 – January 4, 2025
- Winner: (Alberta) Peterman / Gallant
- Curling club: The Glencoe Club, Calgary
- Female: Jocelyn Peterman
- Male: Brett Gallant
- Coach: Laine Peters
- Finalist: (Alberta) Homan / Bottcher

The 2025 Canadian Mixed Doubles Curling Olympic Trials were held from December 30, 2024, to January 4, 2025, at Queens Place Emera Centre in Liverpool, Nova Scotia. The winning team of Jocelyn Peterman and Brett Gallant represented Canada at the 2025 World Mixed Doubles Curling Championship, where they also qualified to represent Canada for the 2026 Winter Olympics.

Unlike previous Canadian Mixed Doubles Curling Trials, athletes were permitted to play in both the Mixed Doubles and Canadian Olympic Curling Trials, and if successful, represent Canada and compete in both mixed doubles and the four-person team events at the 2026 Winter Olympics. This rule change also was part of the rationale to change the timing of these trials to be held 14 months in advance of the Olympics, so there would be little disruption to the training and preparation of four-person teams for the 2025 Canadian Olympic Curling Trials, held in November 2025.

== Qualification process ==
Teams qualified for these Olympics Trials through either their performance at the most recent national championships, their Canadian Mixed Doubles Ranking (CMDR), or through a Direct-Entry Qualifier event. Unlike the four-person team trials, the Mixed Doubles Trials Direct-Entry Qualification events were open to all teams. If a team that already qualified won the direct-entry event, the spot would go to the highest placing non-qualified team at that event.

Qualification method	Berths	Qualifying team(s)
2024 Canadian Mixed Doubles Medallists	3	(Manitoba) Lott / Lott (Alberta) (Saskatchewan) Walker / Muyres (Alberta) Peterman / Gallant
2023-2024 CMDR	2	(Saskatchewan) Martin / Laycock (Ontario) Jones / Laing
Trials Direct-Entry Qualifier #1	1	(Alberta) (Saskatchewan) Tran / Kleiter
Trials Direct-Entry Qualifier #2	1	(Alberta) Homan / Bottcher
Trials Direct-Entry Qualifier #3 (Rocky Mountain Classic)	1	(New Brunswick) (British Columbia) Armstrong / Griffith
CMDR as of Dec. 9, 2024	8	(Ontario) Sandham / Craig (Ontario) Weagle / Epping (British Columbia) Reese-Hansen / Chester (Quebec) Gionest / Desjardins (New Brunswick) Adams / Robichaud (Ontario) Zheng / Pietrangelo (Alberta) Papley / van Amsterdam (British Columbia) Cotter / Cotter

== Teams ==
The teams are listed as follows:

Female	Male	Province(s) / Territory	Club(s)
Melissa Adams	Alex Robichaud	New Brunswick	Capital Winter Club, Fredericton
Jennifer Armstrong	Tyrel Griffith	New Brunswick; British Columbia	Thistle-St. Andrews CC, Saint John & Kelowna Curling Club, Kelowna
Jaelyn Cotter	Jim Cotter	British Columbia	Vernon Curling Club, Vernon
Anne-Sophie Gionest	Robert Desjardins	Quebec	Club de curling Riverbend, Alma & Club de curling Chicoutimi, Chicoutimi
Rachel Homan	Brendan Bottcher	Alberta	Sherwood Park Curling Club, Sherwood Park & Saville Community Sports Centre, Edmonton
Jennifer Jones	Brent Laing	Ontario	Barrie Curling Club, Barrie
Kadriana Lott	Colton Lott	Manitoba	Winnipeg Beach Curling Club, Winnipeg Beach
Nancy Martin	Steve Laycock	Saskatchewan	Nutana Curling Club, Saskatoon
Paige Papley	Evan van Amsterdam	Alberta	Thistle Curling Club, Edmonton
Jocelyn Peterman	Brett Gallant	Alberta	The Glencoe Club, Calgary
Taylor Reese-Hansen	Corey Chester	British Columbia	Victoria Curling Club, Victoria
Riley Sandham	Brendan Craig	Ontario	Guelph Curling Club, Guelph
Brittany Tran	Rylan Kleiter	Alberta; Saskatchewan	Garrison Curling Club, Calgary & Sutherland CC, Saskatoon
Laura Walker	Kirk Muyres	Alberta; Saskatchewan	Sherwood Park Curling Club, Sherwood Park & Wadena RE/MAX Curling Club, Wadena
Lisa Weagle	John Epping	Ontario	Ottawa Curling Club, Ottawa & Granite Club, Toronto
Jessica Zheng	Victor Pietrangelo	Ontario	Niagara Falls Curling Club, Niagara Falls

== Round robin standings ==
Final Round Robin Standings

Key
Teams to Championship Round

Pool A	W	L	W–L	PF	PA	EW	EL	BE	SE	S%	LSD
(Alberta) (Saskatchewan) Tran / Kleiter	6	1	1–0	47	39	30	21	0	10	78%	212.9
(Alberta) Homan / Bottcher	6	1	0–1	52	25	30	18	0	15	81%	159.3
(Ontario) Jones / Laing	4	3	1–0	48	35	28	24	0	10	82%	274.4
(Alberta) (Saskatchewan) Walker / Muyres	4	3	0–1	44	46	26	25	0	6	73%	405.3
(Ontario) Zheng / Pietrangelo	3	4	–	38	40	24	28	0	6	72%	501.7
(Alberta) Papley / van Amsterdam	2	5	1–0	35	48	21	30	0	7	68%	527.0
(Saskatchewan) Martin / Laycock	2	5	0–1	30	47	21	28	0	6	72%	544.2
(Quebec) Gionest / Desjardins	1	6	–	33	47	22	28	0	3	66%	506.8

Pool B	W	L	W–L	PF	PA	EW	EL	BE	SE	S%	LSD
(Alberta) Peterman / Gallant	7	0	–	51	31	34	21	0	11	82%	180.7
(Ontario) Weagle / Epping	5	2	–	54	43	28	26	0	8	77%	239.6
(British Columbia) Cotter / Cotter	4	3	1–0	44	46	25	28	0	9	75%	458.1
(Manitoba) Lott / Lott	4	3	0–1	47	39	28	28	0	8	75%	311.8
(New Brunswick) (British Columbia) Armstrong / Griffith	3	4	–	38	43	24	29	0	7	71%	496.4
(British Columbia) Reese-Hansen / Chester	2	5	1–0	45	49	29	28	0	7	78%	392.7
(New Brunswick) Adams / Robichaud	2	5	0–1	32	45	22	31	0	2	70%	304.9
(Ontario) Sandham / Craig	1	6	–	36	51	27	26	0	10	72%	387.6

Pool A Round Robin Summary Table
Pos.	Team	(Quebec) G/D	(Alberta) H/B	(Ontario) J/L	(Saskatchewan) M/L	(Alberta) P/vA	(Alberta) (Saskatchewan) T/K	(Alberta) (Saskatchewan) W/M	(Ontario) Z/P	Record
8	(Quebec) Gionest / Desjardins	—	2–6	2–8	8–2	6–8	6–8	5–8	4–7	1–6
2	(Alberta) Homan / Bottcher	6–2	—	6–4	8–3	8–2	6–7	11–4	7–3	6–1
3	(Ontario) Jones / Laing	8–2	4–6	—	6–7	9–3	6–9	9–3	6–5	4–3
7	(Saskatchewan) Martin / Laycock	2–8	3–8	7–6	—	4–7	3–6	7–5	4–7	2–5
6	(Alberta) Papley / van Amsterdam	8–6	2–8	3–9	7–4	—	6–8	4–7	5–6	2–5
1	(Alberta) (Saskatchewan) Tran / Kleiter	8–6	7–6	9–6	6–3	8–6	—	3–9	6–3	6–1
4	(Alberta) (Saskatchewan) Walker / Muyres	8–5	4–11	3–9	5–7	7–4	9–3	—	8–7	4–3
5	(Ontario) Zheng / Pietrangelo	7–4	3–7	5–6	7–4	6–5	3–6	7–8	—	3–4

Pool B Round Robin Summary Table
Pos.	Team	(New Brunswick) A/R	(New Brunswick) (British Columbia) A/G	(British Columbia) C/C	(Manitoba) L/L	(Alberta) P/G	(British Columbia) RH/C	(Ontario) S/C	(Ontario) W/E	Record
7	(New Brunswick) Adams / Robichaud	—	2–6	7–3	2–7	6–7	4–8	6–5	5–9	2–5
5	(New Brunswick) (British Columbia) Armstrong / Griffith	6–2	—	4–9	8–5	2–5	8–6	5–7	5–9	3–4
3	(British Columbia) Cotter / Cotter	3–7	9–4	—	7–5	1–8	8–5	8–7	8–10	4–3
4	(Manitoba) Lott / Lott	7–2	5–8	5–7	—	6–9	8–5	8–2	8–6	4–3
1	(Alberta) Peterman / Gallant	7–6	5–2	8–1	9–6	—	8–7	8–6	6–3	7–0
6	(British Columbia) Reese-Hansen / Chester	8–4	6–8	5–8	5–8	7–8	—	7–5	7–8	2–5
8	(Ontario) Sandham / Craig	5–6	7–5	7–8	2–8	6–8	5–7	—	4–9	1–6
2	(Ontario) Weagle / Epping	9–5	9–5	10–8	6–8	3–6	8–7	9–4	—	5–2

== Round robin results ==
All draw times are listed in Atlantic Time (UTC−04:00).

=== Draw 1 ===
Monday, December 30, 9:00 am

Sheet A	1	2	3	4	5	6	7	8	Final
(Ontario) Zheng / Pietrangelo	0	2	0	0	1	0	2	0	5
(Ontario) Jones / Laing 🔨	1	0	1	1	0	1	0	2	6

Sheet B	1	2	3	4	5	6	7	8	Final
(Alberta) Homan / Bottcher 🔨	3	2	0	2	1	0	X	X	8
(Alberta) Papley / van Amsterdam	0	0	1	0	0	1	X	X	2

Sheet C	1	2	3	4	5	6	7	8	9	Final
(Alberta) (Saskatchewan) Walker / Muyres 🔨	0	2	0	1	0	1	0	1	3	8
(Quebec) Gionest / Desjardins	1	0	1	0	2	0	1	0	0	5

Sheet D	1	2	3	4	5	6	7	8	Final
(Alberta) (Saskatchewan) Tran / Kleiter 🔨	0	1	0	2	1	1	1	X	6
(Saskatchewan) Martin / Laycock	2	0	1	0	0	0	0	X	3

=== Draw 2 ===
Monday, December 30, 12:30 pm

Sheet A	1	2	3	4	5	6	7	8	Final
(New Brunswick) Adams / Robichaud 🔨	0	0	0	1	0	1	0	X	2
(Manitoba) Lott / Lott	1	3	1	0	1	0	1	X	7

Sheet B	1	2	3	4	5	6	7	8	Final
(Alberta) Peterman / Gallant 🔨	2	0	1	0	0	3	0	2	8
(Ontario) Sandham / Craig	0	2	0	1	1	0	2	0	6

Sheet C	1	2	3	4	5	6	7	8	Final
(Ontario) Weagle / Epping	0	1	1	0	3	0	3	0	8
(British Columbia) Reese-Hansen / Chester 🔨	1	0	0	2	0	3	0	1	7

Sheet D	1	2	3	4	5	6	7	8	Final
(British Columbia) Cotter / Cotter 🔨	1	0	3	0	1	0	4	X	9
(New Brunswick) (British Columbia) Armstrong / Griffith	0	1	0	1	0	2	0	X	4

=== Draw 3 ===
Monday, December 30, 4:00 pm

Sheet A	1	2	3	4	5	6	7	8	Final
(Alberta) Homan / Bottcher 🔨	0	1	1	0	2	1	1	X	6
(Quebec) Gionest / Desjardins	1	0	0	1	0	0	0	X	2

Sheet B	1	2	3	4	5	6	7	8	Final
(Ontario) Zheng / Pietrangelo 🔨	2	0	0	1	0	0	4	X	7
(Saskatchewan) Martin / Laycock	0	1	1	0	1	1	0	X	4

Sheet C	1	2	3	4	5	6	7	8	Final
(Alberta) (Saskatchewan) Tran / Kleiter 🔨	3	1	3	0	0	1	0	1	9
(Ontario) Jones / Laing	0	0	0	3	1	0	2	0	6

Sheet D	1	2	3	4	5	6	7	8	Final
(Alberta) (Saskatchewan) Walker / Muyres 🔨	2	1	1	0	0	1	0	2	7
(Alberta) Papley / van Amsterdam	0	0	0	1	1	0	2	0	4

=== Draw 4 ===
Monday, December 30, 7:30 pm

Sheet A	1	2	3	4	5	6	7	8	Final
(Alberta) Peterman / Gallant 🔨	2	0	2	0	2	0	0	2	8
(British Columbia) Reese-Hansen / Chester	0	1	0	3	0	2	1	0	7

Sheet B	1	2	3	4	5	6	7	8	Final
(New Brunswick) Adams / Robichaud 🔨	0	1	0	0	0	0	1	X	2
(New Brunswick) (British Columbia) Armstrong / Griffith	2	0	1	1	1	1	0	X	6

Sheet C	1	2	3	4	5	6	7	8	9	Final
(British Columbia) Cotter / Cotter	1	1	0	0	1	1	1	0	2	7
(Manitoba) Lott / Lott 🔨	0	0	1	2	0	0	0	2	0	5

Sheet D	1	2	3	4	5	6	7	8	Final
(Ontario) Weagle / Epping 🔨	1	5	0	0	0	2	1	X	9
(Ontario) Sandham / Craig	0	0	1	2	1	0	0	X	4

=== Draw 5 ===
Tuesday, December 31, 9:00 am

Sheet A	1	2	3	4	5	6	7	8	Final
(Alberta) (Saskatchewan) Tran / Kleiter 🔨	0	1	0	1	1	0	X	X	3
(Alberta) (Saskatchewan) Walker / Muyres	4	0	2	0	0	3	X	X	9

Sheet B	1	2	3	4	5	6	7	8	Final
(Ontario) Jones / Laing 🔨	1	0	2	2	0	3	X	X	8
(Quebec) Gionest / Desjardins	0	1	0	0	1	0	X	X	2

Sheet C	1	2	3	4	5	6	7	8	Final
(Saskatchewan) Martin / Laycock	1	0	1	0	1	1	0	0	4
(Alberta) Papley / van Amsterdam 🔨	0	3	0	1	0	0	1	2	7

Sheet D	1	2	3	4	5	6	7	8	Final
(Ontario) Zheng / Pietrangelo	2	0	0	1	0	0	0	X	3
(Alberta) Homan / Bottcher 🔨	0	2	1	0	1	1	2	X	7

=== Draw 6 ===
Tuesday, December 31, 12:30 pm

Sheet A	1	2	3	4	5	6	7	8	Final
(British Columbia) Cotter / Cotter 🔨	2	0	3	1	0	2	0	0	8
(Ontario) Weagle / Epping	0	4	0	0	3	0	2	1	10

Sheet B	1	2	3	4	5	6	7	8	Final
(Manitoba) Lott / Lott	0	2	0	0	2	0	3	1	8
(British Columbia) Reese-Hansen / Chester 🔨	1	0	2	1	0	1	0	0	5

Sheet C	1	2	3	4	5	6	7	8	Final
(New Brunswick) (British Columbia) Armstrong / Griffith	0	0	2	0	0	3	0	0	5
(Ontario) Sandham / Craig 🔨	1	1	0	1	1	0	2	1	7

Sheet D	1	2	3	4	5	6	7	8	9	Final
(New Brunswick) Adams / Robichaud	0	1	1	0	2	0	2	0	0	6
(Alberta) Peterman / Gallant 🔨	1	0	0	3	0	1	0	1	1	7

=== Draw 7 ===
Tuesday, December 31, 4:00 pm

Sheet A	1	2	3	4	5	6	7	8	Final
(Quebec) Gionest / Desjardins 🔨	0	2	0	0	2	0	2	X	6
(Alberta) Papley / van Amsterdam	1	0	5	1	0	1	0	X	8

Sheet B	1	2	3	4	5	6	7	8	Final
(Alberta) (Saskatchewan) Tran / Kleiter 🔨	1	0	1	1	0	3	0	X	6
(Ontario) Zheng / Pietrangelo	0	1	0	0	1	0	1	X	3

Sheet C	1	2	3	4	5	6	7	8	Final
(Alberta) Homan / Bottcher 🔨	4	0	4	0	3	0	X	X	11
(Alberta) (Saskatchewan) Walker / Muyres	0	2	0	1	0	1	X	X	4

Sheet D	1	2	3	4	5	6	7	8	Final
(Saskatchewan) Martin / Laycock	0	2	0	2	0	2	0	1	7
(Ontario) Jones / Laing 🔨	1	0	1	0	3	0	1	0	6

=== Draw 8 ===
Tuesday, December 31, 7:30 pm

Sheet A	1	2	3	4	5	6	7	8	Final
(British Columbia) Reese-Hansen / Chester	0	2	0	0	1	0	3	1	7
(Ontario) Sandham / Craig 🔨	1	0	1	1	0	2	0	0	5

Sheet B	1	2	3	4	5	6	7	8	Final
(British Columbia) Cotter / Cotter	0	0	1	1	0	1	0	X	3
(New Brunswick) Adams / Robichaud 🔨	2	1	0	0	1	0	3	X	7

Sheet C	1	2	3	4	5	6	7	8	Final
(Alberta) Peterman / Gallant	0	1	0	1	2	1	0	1	6
(Ontario) Weagle / Epping 🔨	1	0	1	0	0	0	1	0	3

Sheet D	1	2	3	4	5	6	7	8	Final
(New Brunswick) (British Columbia) Armstrong / Griffith 🔨	2	2	1	0	2	0	0	1	8
(Manitoba) Lott / Lott	0	0	0	1	0	3	1	0	5

=== Draw 9 ===
Wednesday, January 1, 10:00 am

Sheet A	1	2	3	4	5	6	7	8	Final
(Ontario) Weagle / Epping 🔨	1	0	1	0	4	0	3	X	9
(New Brunswick) Adams / Robichaud	0	3	0	1	0	1	0	X	5

Sheet B	1	2	3	4	5	6	7	8	Final
(Ontario) Sandham / Craig	0	0	0	0	2	0	X	X	2
(Manitoba) Lott / Lott 🔨	1	2	3	1	0	1	X	X	8

Sheet C	1	2	3	4	5	6	7	8	9	Final
(British Columbia) Reese-Hansen / Chester 🔨	0	1	0	2	0	2	0	1	0	6
(New Brunswick) (British Columbia) Armstrong / Griffith	1	0	1	0	1	0	3	0	2	8

Sheet D	1	2	3	4	5	6	7	8	Final
(Alberta) Peterman / Gallant 🔨	2	2	1	0	1	2	X	X	8
(British Columbia) Cotter / Cotter	0	0	0	1	0	0	X	X	1

=== Draw 10 ===
Wednesday, January 1, 1:30 pm

Sheet A	1	2	3	4	5	6	7	8	Final
(Alberta) (Saskatchewan) Walker / Muyres	0	1	0	3	0	2	0	2	8
(Ontario) Zheng / Pietrangelo 🔨	1	0	1	0	4	0	1	0	7

Sheet B	1	2	3	4	5	6	7	8	Final
(Alberta) Papley / van Amsterdam 🔨	0	0	0	1	2	0	0	X	3
(Ontario) Jones / Laing	2	2	1	0	0	2	2	X	9

Sheet C	1	2	3	4	5	6	7	8	Final
(Quebec) Gionest / Desjardins 🔨	1	0	3	0	1	3	X	X	8
(Saskatchewan) Martin / Laycock	0	1	0	1	0	0	X	X	2

Sheet D	1	2	3	4	5	6	7	8	Final
(Alberta) Homan / Bottcher	0	0	2	0	2	0	2	0	6
(Alberta) (Saskatchewan) Tran / Kleiter 🔨	2	1	0	1	0	2	0	1	7

=== Draw 11 ===
Wednesday, January 1, 5:00 pm

Sheet A	1	2	3	4	5	6	7	8	Final
(New Brunswick) (British Columbia) Armstrong / Griffith	0	0	0	0	1	0	1	X	2
(Alberta) Peterman / Gallant 🔨	1	1	1	1	0	1	0	X	5

Sheet B	1	2	3	4	5	6	7	8	Final
(British Columbia) Reese-Hansen / Chester	2	0	1	1	1	0	0	0	5
(British Columbia) Cotter / Cotter 🔨	0	2	0	0	0	3	1	2	8

Sheet C	1	2	3	4	5	6	7	8	Final
(Ontario) Sandham / Craig	0	1	1	0	1	0	2	0	5
(New Brunswick) Adams / Robichaud 🔨	1	0	0	2	0	2	0	1	6

Sheet D	1	2	3	4	5	6	7	8	9	Final
(Manitoba) Lott / Lott	0	2	1	0	0	1	0	2	2	8
(Ontario) Weagle / Epping 🔨	1	0	0	2	1	0	2	0	0	6

=== Draw 12 ===
Wednesday, January 1, 8:30 pm

Sheet A	1	2	3	4	5	6	7	8	Final
(Saskatchewan) Martin / Laycock	1	0	0	0	0	2	X	X	3
(Alberta) Homan / Bottcher 🔨	0	2	1	3	2	0	X	X	8

Sheet B	1	2	3	4	5	6	7	8	Final
(Quebec) Gionest / Desjardins 🔨	1	0	2	0	2	0	1	0	6
(Alberta) (Saskatchewan) Tran / Kleiter	0	1	0	1	0	3	0	3	8

Sheet C	1	2	3	4	5	6	7	8	Final
(Alberta) Papley / van Amsterdam	1	0	0	0	0	1	3	0	5
(Ontario) Zheng / Pietrangelo 🔨	0	1	1	1	2	0	0	1	6

Sheet D	1	2	3	4	5	6	7	8	Final
(Ontario) Jones / Laing 🔨	2	4	1	0	0	1	1	X	9
(Alberta) (Saskatchewan) Walker / Muyres	0	0	0	2	1	0	0	X	3

=== Draw 13 ===
Thursday, January 2, 10:00 am

Sheet A	1	2	3	4	5	6	7	8	Final
(Ontario) Sandham / Craig 🔨	1	2	1	0	0	2	0	1	7
(British Columbia) Cotter / Cotter	0	0	0	3	3	0	2	0	8

Sheet B	1	2	3	4	5	6	7	8	Final
(New Brunswick) (British Columbia) Armstrong / Griffith 🔨	2	0	0	3	0	0	0	X	5
(Ontario) Weagle / Epping	0	3	1	0	3	1	1	X	9

Sheet C	1	2	3	4	5	6	7	8	9	Final
(Manitoba) Lott / Lott	0	1	0	0	0	1	0	4	0	6
(Alberta) Peterman / Gallant 🔨	2	0	1	1	1	0	1	0	3	9

Sheet D	1	2	3	4	5	6	7	8	Final
(British Columbia) Reese-Hansen / Chester 🔨	1	1	0	3	0	2	0	1	8
(New Brunswick) Adams / Robichaud	0	0	2	0	1	0	1	0	4

=== Draw 14 ===
Thursday, January 2, 1:00 pm

Sheet A	1	2	3	4	5	6	7	8	Final
(Alberta) Papley / van Amsterdam 🔨	0	3	0	0	2	0	1	X	6
(Alberta) (Saskatchewan) Tran / Kleiter	2	0	2	3	0	1	0	X	8

Sheet B	1	2	3	4	5	6	7	8	Final
(Saskatchewan) Martin / Laycock 🔨	3	0	1	0	3	0	0	X	7
(Alberta) (Saskatchewan) Walker / Muyres	0	1	0	1	0	2	1	X	5

Sheet C	1	2	3	4	5	6	7	8	Final
(Ontario) Jones / Laing 🔨	0	0	0	0	1	0	3	0	4
(Alberta) Homan / Bottcher	1	1	1	1	0	1	0	1	6

Sheet D	1	2	3	4	5	6	7	8	Final
(Quebec) Gionest / Desjardins 🔨	0	2	0	1	0	0	1	X	4
(Ontario) Zheng / Pietrangelo	2	0	1	0	3	1	0	X	7

== Championship round ==
Page 1/2 Qualifier
A1 vs. B2
A1	(Alberta) (Saskatchewan) Tran / Kleiter	5
B2	(Ontario) Weagle / Epping	10

Page 3/4 Qualifier
A1 vs. A3
A1	(Alberta) (Saskatchewan) Tran / Kleiter	8
A3	(Ontario) Jones / Laing	6

Qualified for Playoffs
(Ontario) Weagle / Epping	To 1 vs. 2 Page
(Alberta) (Saskatchewan) Tran / Kleiter	To 3 vs. 4 Page

Page 1/2 Qualifier
B1 vs. A2
B1	(Alberta) Peterman / Gallant	8
A2	(Alberta) Homan / Bottcher	4

Page 3/4 Qualifier
A2 vs. B3
A2	(Alberta) Homan / Bottcher	9
B3	(British Columbia) Cotter / Cotter	6

Qualified for Playoffs
(Alberta) Peterman / Gallant	To 1 vs. 2 Page
(Alberta) Homan / Bottcher	To 3 vs. 4 Page

=== Page 1/2 Qualifier ===
Thursday, January 2, 6:00 pm

Sheet B	1	2	3	4	5	6	7	8	Final
(Alberta) Peterman / Gallant 🔨	3	0	3	0	1	0	1	X	8
(Alberta) Homan / Bottcher	0	1	0	2	0	1	0	X	4

Player percentages
(Alberta) Peterman / Gallant		(Alberta) Homan / Bottcher	
Jocelyn Peterman	86%	Rachel Homan	70%
Brett Gallant	85%	Brendan Bottcher	94%
Total	86%	Total	85%

Sheet C	1	2	3	4	5	6	7	8	Final
(Alberta) (Saskatchewan) Tran / Kleiter 🔨	0	3	0	1	0	1	0	0	5
(Ontario) Weagle / Epping	1	0	3	0	2	0	2	2	10

Player percentages
(Alberta) (Saskatchewan) Tran / Kleiter		(Ontario) Weagle / Epping	
Brittany Tran	58%	Lisa Weagle	80%
Rylan Kleiter	66%	John Epping	91%
Total	63%	Total	86%

=== Page 3/4 Qualifier ===
Friday, January 3, 2:00 pm

Sheet B	1	2	3	4	5	6	7	8	9	Final
(Alberta) (Saskatchewan) Tran / Kleiter 🔨	0	0	3	0	1	0	2	0	2	8
(Ontario) Jones / Laing	1	1	0	1	0	1	0	2	0	6

Player percentages
(Alberta) (Saskatchewan) Tran / Kleiter		(Ontario) Jones / Laing	
Brittany Tran	50%	Jennifer Jones	67%
Rylan Kleiter	70%	Brent Laing	73%
Total	62%	Total	71%

Sheet C	1	2	3	4	5	6	7	8	Final
(Alberta) Homan / Bottcher 🔨	0	4	0	4	0	1	0	X	9
(British Columbia) Cotter / Cotter	1	0	1	0	2	0	2	X	6

Player percentages
(Alberta) Homan / Bottcher		(British Columbia) Cotter / Cotter	
Rachel Homan	73%	Jaelyn Cotter	63%
Brendan Bottcher	89%	Jim Cotter	83%
Total	83%	Total	76%

== Playoffs ==
Page playoff system
1	(Alberta) Peterman / Gallant	8
2	(Ontario) Weagle / Epping	4
3	(Alberta) (Saskatchewan) Tran / Kleiter	3
4	(Alberta) Homan / Bottcher	8

Semifinal
2	(Ontario) Weagle / Epping	6
4	(Alberta) Homan / Bottcher	8

Final
1	(Alberta) Peterman / Gallant	8
4	(Alberta) Homan / Bottcher	7

=== 1 vs. 2 ===
Friday, January 3, 7:00 pm

Sheet C	1	2	3	4	5	6	7	8	Final
(Alberta) Peterman / Gallant 🔨	1	0	1	0	3	0	3	X	8
(Ontario) Weagle / Epping	0	2	0	1	0	1	0	X	4

Player percentages
(Alberta) Peterman / Gallant		(Ontario) Weagle / Epping	
Jocelyn Peterman	77%	Lisa Weagle	80%
Brett Gallant	72%	John Epping	80%
Total	74%	Total	80%

=== 3 vs. 4 ===
Friday, January 3, 7:00 pm

Sheet B	1	2	3	4	5	6	7	8	Final
(Alberta) (Saskatchewan) Tran / Kleiter 🔨	1	0	0	0	1	0	1	X	3
(Alberta) Homan / Bottcher	0	3	2	2	0	1	0	X	8

Player percentages
(Alberta) (Saskatchewan) Tran / Kleiter		(Alberta) Homan / Bottcher	
Brittany Tran	52%	Rachel Homan	84%
Rylan Kleiter	62%	Brendan Bottcher	85%
Total	58%	Total	84%

=== Semifinal ===
Saturday, January 4, 10:00 am

Sheet C	1	2	3	4	5	6	7	8	Final
(Ontario) Weagle / Epping	0	2	0	1	0	1	0	2	6
(Alberta) Homan / Bottcher 🔨	2	0	1	0	1	0	4	0	8

Player percentages
(Ontario) Weagle / Epping		(Alberta) Homan / Bottcher	
Lisa Weagle	85%	Rachel Homan	83%
John Epping	92%	Brendan Bottcher	81%
Total	89%	Total	82%

=== Final ===
Saturday, January 4, 2:00 pm

Sheet C	1	2	3	4	5	6	7	8	Final
(Alberta) Peterman / Gallant 🔨	3	1	0	2	0	2	0	0	8
(Alberta) Homan / Bottcher	0	0	1	0	2	0	2	2	7

Player percentages
(Alberta) Peterman / Gallant		(Alberta) Homan / Bottcher	
Jocelyn Peterman	77%	Rachel Homan	66%
Brett Gallant	83%	Brendan Bottcher	82%
Total	81%	Total	76%

== Qualification Events ==
=== Direct-Entry Qualifier #1 ===
October 31 – November 3, Maple Ridge, British Columbia

==== Teams ====
The teams are listed as follows:

Female	Male	Locale(s)
Jennifer Armstrong	Tyrel Griffith	Saint John, New Brunswick & Kelowna, British Columbia
Brett Barber	Mitchell Heidt	Kerrobert, Saskatchewan
Jaelyn Cotter	Jim Cotter	Vernon, British Columbia
Cheryl Damen	Tyler van Amsterdam	Edmonton, Alberta
Christie Gamble	Dustin Kalthoff	Saskatoon, Saskatchewan
Anne-Sophie Gionest	Robert Desjardins	Alma & Chicoutimi, Quebec
Shawna Jensen	Daniel Deng	Victoria, British Columbia
Jennifer Jones	Brent Laing	Barrie, Ontario
Sherry Just	Kyle Cherpin	Prince Albert, Saskatchewan
Ashley Kalk	Craig MacAlpine	Edmonton, Alberta
Julianna Mackenzie	Sterling Middleton	Vernon, British Columbia
Ashley Mallett	Nick Meister	Langley, British Columbia
Nancy Martin	Steve Laycock	Saskatoon, Saskatchewan
Layna Pohlod	Matthew Fenton	New Westminster, British Columbia
Kaylee Raniseth	Evan Crough	Calgary, Alberta
Taylor Reese-Hansen	Corey Chester	Victoria, British Columbia
Riley Sandham	Brendan Craig	Guelph, Ontario
Amanda Sluchinski	Aaron Sluchinski	Airdrie, Alberta
Donna Thornborough	Jason Larence	Vernon, British Columbia
Brittany Tran	Rylan Kleiter	Calgary, Alberta & Saskatoon, Saskatchewan
Laura Walker	Kirk Muyres	Sherwood Park, Alberta & Wadena, Saskatchewan
Lauren Wasylkiw	Shane Konings	Unionville, Ontario
Lisa Weagle	John Epping	Ottawa & Toronto, Ontario
Courtney Woo	Daniel Wenzek	New Westminster, British Columbia
Samantha Yachiw-Omelian	Jordan Raymond	Saskatoon, Saskatchewan

==== Knockout Results ====
===== A Event =====
Qualifier 1
(British Columbia) Reese-Hansen / Chester	7
(Saskatchewan) Gamble / Kalthoff	7	(Saskatchewan) Gamble / Kalthoff	6
(Saskatchewan) Yachiw-Omelian / Raymond	2	(British Columbia) Reese-Hansen / Chester	3
(New Brunswick) (British Columbia) Armstrong / Griffith	8
(New Brunswick) (British Columbia) Armstrong / Griffith	10
(Ontario) Wasylkiw / Konings	5	(British Columbia) Jensen / Deng	6
(British Columbia) Jensen / Deng	8	(New Brunswick) (British Columbia) Armstrong / Griffith	9
(Quebec) Gionest / Desjardins	8	(Alberta) (Saskatchewan) Walker / Muyres	6
(British Columbia) Pohlod / Fenton	9	(British Columbia) Pohlod / Fenton	6
(Ontario) Sandham / Craig	10	(Ontario) Sandham / Craig	7
(British Columbia) Thornborough / Larence	2	(Ontario) Sandham / Craig	6
(Saskatchewan) Barber / Heidt	5	(Alberta) (Saskatchewan) Walker / Muyres	7
(British Columbia) Woo / Wenzek	7	(British Columbia) Woo / Wenzek	5
(Alberta) (Saskatchewan) Walker / Muyres	11

Qualifier 2
(Alberta) Kalk / MacAlpine	6
(Alberta) Raniseth / Crough	4	(Alberta) Kalk / MacAlpine	6
(Ontario) Jones / Laing	7
(Ontario) Jones / Laing	8
(British Columbia) Cotter / Cotter	2
(British Columbia) Cotter / Cotter	8
(Alberta) Sluchinski / Sluchinski	8	(Alberta) Sluchinski / Sluchinski	2
(Saskatchewan) Just / Cherpin	3	(Ontario) Jones / Laing	7
(Alberta) (Saskatchewan) Tran / Kleiter	10	(Ontario) Weagle / Epping	6
(Alberta) Damen / van Amsterdam	9	(Alberta) (Saskatchewan) Tran / Kleiter	4
(Ontario) Weagle / Epping	6
(Ontario) Weagle / Epping	9
(British Columbia) Mackenzie / Middleton	6	(British Columbia) Mackenzie / Middleton	6
(British Columbia) Mallett / Meister	4	(British Columbia) Mackenzie / Middleton	7
(Saskatchewan) Martin / Laycock	4

===== B Event =====
Qualifier 3
(Saskatchewan) Gamble / Kalthoff	9
(British Columbia) Pohlod / Fenton	1
(Saskatchewan) Gamble / Kalthoff	9
(British Columbia) Cotter / Cotter	3
(Saskatchewan) Gamble / Kalthoff	2
(British Columbia) Woo / Wenzek	7
(British Columbia) Woo / Wenzek	8
(Saskatchewan) Yachiw-Omelian / Raymond	4	(Ontario) Wasylkiw / Konings	6
(Ontario) Wasylkiw / Konings	9	(British Columbia) Woo / Wenzek	8
(British Columbia) Mackenzie / Middleton	4
(British Columbia) Woo / Wenzek	5
(Alberta) (Saskatchewan) Walker / Muyres	8
(Quebec) Gionest / Desjardins	9
(British Columbia) Thornborough / Larence	2
(Quebec) Gionest / Desjardins	10
(Saskatchewan) Barber / Heidt	8
(Saskatchewan) Barber / Heidt	7
(British Columbia) Jensen / Deng	4
(Quebec) Gionest / Desjardins	3
(Alberta) (Saskatchewan) Walker / Muyres	10

Qualifier 4
(Alberta) (Saskatchewan) Tran / Kleiter	6
(Saskatchewan) Martin / Laycock	7	(Saskatchewan) Martin / Laycock	5
(British Columbia) Reese-Hansen / Chester	6
(British Columbia) Reese-Hansen / Chester	10
(Alberta) Raniseth / Crough	4	(Ontario) Sandham / Craig	6
(Saskatchewan) Just / Cherpin	8	(Saskatchewan) Just / Cherpin	4
(Ontario) Sandham / Craig	9
(British Columbia) Reese-Hansen / Chester	6
(Alberta) Damen / van Amsterdam	5	(Ontario) Weagle / Epping	8
(British Columbia) Mallett / Meister	6	(British Columbia) Mallett / Meister	5
(Alberta) Kalk / MacAlpine	6	(Alberta) Sluchinski / Sluchinski	8
(Alberta) Sluchinski / Sluchinski	9	(Alberta) Sluchinski / Sluchinski	3
(Ontario) Weagle / Epping	8

===== C Event =====
				Qualifier 5
		(British Columbia) Mallett / Meister	6
(Saskatchewan) Yachiw-Omelian / Raymond	2	(British Columbia) Pohlod / Fenton	3
(British Columbia) Pohlod / Fenton	6			(British Columbia) Mallett / Meister	4
				(British Columbia) Woo / Wenzek	8

Qualifier 6
(British Columbia) Cotter / Cotter	8
(British Columbia) Mackenzie / Middleton	6	(British Columbia) Cotter / Cotter	6
(Quebec) Gionest / Desjardins	7
(Quebec) Gionest / Desjardins	7
(Alberta) Damen / van Amsterdam	2	(Saskatchewan) Gamble / Kalthoff	5
(Alberta) Kalk / MacAlpine	8	(Alberta) Kalk / MacAlpine	3
(Saskatchewan) Gamble / Kalthoff	7

Qualifier 7
(Saskatchewan) Martin / Laycock	6
(Saskatchewan) Just / Cherpin	7	(Saskatchewan) Just / Cherpin	4
(Alberta) Sluchinski / Sluchinski	8
(Alberta) Sluchinski / Sluchinski	5
(British Columbia) Thornborough / Larence	2	(Ontario) Sandham / Craig	7
(British Columbia) Jensen / Deng	9	(British Columbia) Jensen / Deng	5
(Ontario) Sandham / Craig	6

				Qualifier 8
(Ontario) Wasylkiw / Konings	3
(Saskatchewan) Barber / Heidt	7	(Saskatchewan) Barber / Heidt	6
(Alberta) (Saskatchewan) Tran / Kleiter	7	(Alberta) (Saskatchewan) Tran / Kleiter	7
(Alberta) Raniseth / Crough	4			(Alberta) (Saskatchewan) Tran / Kleiter	5
				(British Columbia) Reese-Hansen / Chester	4

==== Playoffs ====
Quarterfinals
(New Brunswick) (British Columbia) Armstrong / Griffith	7
(British Columbia) Woo / Wenzek	3
(Ontario) Weagle / Epping	8
(Quebec) Gionest / Desjardins	2
(Alberta) (Saskatchewan) Walker / Muyres	6
(Ontario) Sandham / Craig	11
(Ontario) Jones / Laing	6
(Alberta) (Saskatchewan) Tran / Kleiter	7

Semifinals
(New Brunswick) (British Columbia) Armstrong / Griffith	5
(Ontario) Weagle / Epping	10
(Ontario) Sandham / Craig	4
(Alberta) (Saskatchewan) Tran / Kleiter	8

Final
(Ontario) Weagle / Epping	3
(Alberta) (Saskatchewan) Tran / Kleiter	6

=== Direct-Entry Qualifier #2 ===
November 21–24, Guelph, Ontario

==== Teams ====
The teams are listed as follows:

Female	Male	Locale(s)
Mackenzie Arbuckle	Aaron Macdonell	Winnipeg, Manitoba
Anneka Burghout	Marty Thompson	Toronto, Ontario
Michelle Butler	Jerry Butler	Cambridge, Ontario
Jaelyn Cotter	Jim Cotter	Vernon, British Columbia
Katie Ford	Oliver Campbell	Waterloo, Ontario
Christie Gamble	Dustin Kalthoff	Saskatoon, Saskatchewan
Joanne Gill	Ron Gill	Parry Sound, Ontario
Rachel Homan	Brendan Bottcher	Sherwood Park & Edmonton, Alberta
Sherry Just	Kyle Cherpin	Prince Albert, Saskatchewan
Mackenzie Kiemele	Graham Singer	Toronto, Ontario
Catherine Liscumb	Chris Liscumb	Ilderton, Ontario
Mikaylah Lyburn	William Lyburn	Winnipeg, Manitoba
Amélie Maheux	David Maheux	Saint-Bruno-de-Montarville, Quebec
Laura Neil	Scott McDonald	St. Thomas, Ontario
Emily Riley	Jessie Mullen	Montreal, Quebec
Michelle Roach	Adam Gilbert	Burlington, Ontario
Riley Sandham	Brendan Craig	Guelph, Ontario
Megan Smith	Doug Thompson	Newmarket, Ontario
Cassandra Spruit	Geoff Spruit	Winchester, Ontario
Val Sweeting	Marc Kennedy	Edmonton, Alberta
Brittany Tran	Rylan Kleiter	Calgary, Alberta & Saskatoon, Saskatchewan
Laura Walker	Kirk Muyres	Sherwood Park, Alberta & Wadena, Saskatchewan
Lauren Wasylkiw	Shane Konings	Unionville, Ontario
Terri Weeks	Sam Steep	Waterloo, Ontario
Jessica Zheng	Victor Pietrangelo	Niagara Falls, Ontario

==== Knockout Results ====
===== A Event =====
Qualifier 1
(Ontario) Sandham / Craig	8
(Ontario) Smith / Thompson	7	(Ontario) Smith / Thompson	3
(Ontario) Butler / Butler	3	(Ontario) Sandham / Craig	4
(Alberta) Homan / Bottcher	11
(Alberta) Homan / Bottcher	8
(Quebec) Maheux / Maheux	9	(Quebec) Maheux / Maheux	6
(Saskatchewan) Just / Cherpin	2	(Alberta) Homan / Bottcher	5
(Ontario) Neil / McDonald	11	(Ontario) Neil / McDonald	3
(Ontario) Gill / Gill	3	(Ontario) Neil / McDonald	7
(Ontario) Weeks / Steep	4	(Ontario) Ford / Krowchuk	1
(Ontario) Ford / Krowchuk	11	(Ontario) Neil / McDonald	8
(Ontario) Spruit / Spruit	6	(Manitoba) Lyburn / Lyburn	5
(Manitoba) Lyburn / Lyburn	8	(Manitoba) Lyburn / Lyburn	8
(Alberta) (Saskatchewan) Walker / Muyres	5

Qualifier 2
(Alberta) Sweeting / Kennedy	8
(Ontario) Burghout / Thompson	5	(Alberta) Sweeting / Kennedy	8
(Ontario) Zheng / Pietrangelo	10
(Ontario) Zheng / Pietrangelo	6
(Alberta) (Saskatchewan) Tran / Kleiter	5
(Alberta) (Saskatchewan) Tran / Kleiter	6
(Saskatchewan) Gamble / Kalthoff	3	(Manitoba) Arbuckle / Macdonell	3
(Manitoba) Arbuckle / Macdonell	11	(Ontario) Zheng / Pietrangelo	5
(Quebec) Riley / Mullen	7	(Quebec) Riley / Mullen	4
(Ontario) Roach / Gilbert	5	(Quebec) Riley / Mullen	8
(Ontario) Wasylkiw / Konings	7
(Quebec) Riley / Mullen	9
(Ontario) Kiemele / Singer	11	(British Columbia) Cotter / Cotter	5
(Ontario) Liscumb / Liscumb	5	(Ontario) Kiemele / Singer	6
(British Columbia) Cotter / Cotter	8

===== B Event =====
Qualifier 3
(Ontario) Smith / Thompson	10
(Ontario) Ford / Krowchuk	3
(Ontario) Smith / Thompson	2
(Alberta) (Saskatchewan) Tran / Kleiter	8
(Alberta) (Saskatchewan) Tran / Kleiter	7
(Alberta) (Saskatchewan) Walker / Muyres	8
(Alberta) (Saskatchewan) Walker / Muyres	6
(Ontario) Butler / Butler	10	(Ontario) Butler / Butler	4
(Saskatchewan) Just / Cherpin	6	(Alberta) (Saskatchewan) Walker / Muyres	5
(British Columbia) Cotter / Cotter	3
(Alberta) (Saskatchewan) Walker / Muyres	9
(Ontario) Weeks / Steep	5
(Ontario) Gill / Gill	5
(Ontario) Weeks / Steep	14
(Ontario) Weeks / Steep	10
(Ontario) Spruit / Spruit	3
(Ontario) Spruit / Spruit	12
(Quebec) Maheux / Maheux	6
(Ontario) Weeks / Steep	7
(Ontario) Neil / McDonald	6

Qualifier 4
(Ontario) Wasylkiw / Konings	7
(Ontario) Kiemele / Singer	5	(Ontario) Wasylkiw / Konings	9
(Ontario) Sandham / Craig	6
(Ontario) Wasylkiw / Konings	9
(Ontario) Burghout / Thompson	5	(Manitoba) Lyburn / Lyburn	4
(Saskatchewan) Gamble / Kalthoff	6	(Saskatchewan) Gamble / Kalthoff	4
(Manitoba) Lyburn / Lyburn	9
(Ontario) Wasylkiw / Konings	6
(Ontario) Roach / Gilbert	6	(Alberta) Sweeting / Kennedy	7
(Ontario) Liscumb / Liscumb	10	(Ontario) Liscumb / Liscumb	5
(Alberta) Sweeting / Kennedy	11	(Alberta) Sweeting / Kennedy	9
(Manitoba) Arbuckle / Macdonell	8	(Alberta) Sweeting / Kennedy	6
(Quebec) Riley / Mullen	5

===== C Event =====
				Qualifier 5
		(Ontario) Liscumb / Liscumb	1
(Saskatchewan) Just / Cherpin	11	(Saskatchewan) Just / Cherpin	9
(Ontario) Ford / Krowchuk	3			(Saskatchewan) Just / Cherpin	8
				(Ontario) Weeks / Steep	5

Qualifier 6
(Ontario) Smith / Thompson	4
(British Columbia) Cotter / Cotter	6	(British Columbia) Cotter / Cotter	2
(Ontario) Neil / McDonald	10
(Ontario) Neil / McDonald	9
(Ontario) Roach / Gilbert	4	(Manitoba) Arbuckle / Macdonell	4
(Manitoba) Arbuckle / Macdonell	6	(Manitoba) Arbuckle / Macdonell	6
(Alberta) (Saskatchewan) Tran / Kleiter	5

Qualifier 7
(Ontario) Sandham / Craig	3
(Saskatchewan) Gamble / Kalthoff	7	(Saskatchewan) Gamble / Kalthoff	5
(Quebec) Riley / Mullen	3
(Saskatchewan) Gamble / Kalthoff	8
(Ontario) Gill / Gill	3	(Manitoba) Lyburn / Lyburn	10
(Quebec) Maheux / Maheux	9	(Quebec) Maheux / Maheux	2
(Manitoba) Lyburn / Lyburn	7

				Qualifier 8
(Ontario) Butler / Butler	5
(Ontario) Spruit / Spruit	13	(Ontario) Spruit / Spruit	4
(Ontario) Kiemele / Singer	7	(Ontario) Burghout / Thompson	9
(Ontario) Burghout / Thompson	8			(Ontario) Burghout / Thompson	3
				(Ontario) Wasylkiw / Konings	12

==== Playoffs ====
Quarterfinals
(Alberta) Homan / Bottcher	9
(Saskatchewan) Just / Cherpin	2
(Alberta) Sweeting / Kennedy	3
(Ontario) Neil / McDonald	8
(Alberta) (Saskatchewan) Walker / Muyres	7
(Manitoba) Lyburn / Lyburn	6
(Ontario) Zheng / Pietrangelo	6
(Ontario) Wasylkiw / Konings	7

Semifinals
(Alberta) Homan / Bottcher	9
(Ontario) Neil / McDonald	4
(Alberta) (Saskatchewan) Walker / Muyres	2
(Ontario) Wasylkiw / Konings	6

Final
(Alberta) Homan / Bottcher	8
(Ontario) Wasylkiw / Konings	1

=== Direct-Entry Qualifier #3 ===
Rocky Mountain Classic, December 5–8, Banff & Canmore, Alberta

==== Teams ====
The teams are listed as follows:

Female	Male	Locale(s)
Melissa Adams	Alex Robichaud	Fredericton, New Brunswick
Jennifer Armstrong	Tyrel Griffith	Saint John, New Brunswick & Kelowna, British Columbia
Brett Barber	Mitchell Heidt	Kerrobert, Saskatchewan
Sophie Brissette	Ryan Parent	Calgary, Alberta
Kira Brunton	Jacob Horgan	Ottawa & Sudbury, Ontario
Zoe Cinnamon	Johnson Tao	Edmonton, Alberta
Jaelyn Cotter	Jim Cotter	Vernon, British Columbia
Cheryl Damen	Tyler van Amsterdam	Edmonton, Alberta
Émilia Gagné	Pierre-Luc Morissette	Quebec City, Quebec
Christie Gamble	Dustin Kalthoff	Saskatoon, Saskatchewan
Rachel Homan	Brendan Bottcher	Edmonton, Alberta
Jennifer Jones	Brent Laing	Barrie, Ontario
Sherry Just	Kyle Cherpin	Prince Albert, Saskatchewan
Ashley Kalk	Craig MacAlpine	Edmonton, Alberta
Kadriana Lott	Colton Lott	Winnipeg Beach, Manitoba
Mikaylah Lyburn	William Lyburn	Winnipeg, Manitoba
Julianna Mackenzie	Sterling Middleton	Vernon, British Columbia
Meaghan Mallett	Brendan Jackson	Toronto, Ontario
Nancy Martin	Steve Laycock	Saskatoon, Saskatchewan
Anna Munroe	Steven Leong	Edmonton, Alberta
Paige Papley	Evan van Amsterdam	Edmonton, Alberta
Jocelyn Peterman	Brett Gallant	Calgary, Alberta
Marlee Powers	Luke Saunders	Halifax, Nova Scotia
Taylor Reese-Hansen	Corey Chester	Victoria, British Columbia
Jennifer Sachkiw	Ryan Jacques	Banff & Edmonton, Alberta
Kayla Skrlik	Jeremy Harty	Calgary, Alberta
Amanda Sluchinski	Aaron Sluchinski	Airdrie, Alberta
Selena Sturmay	Kyler Kleibrink	Edmonton, Alberta
Brittany Tran	Rylan Kleiter	Calgary, Alberta & Saskatoon, Saskatchewan
Laura Walker	Kirk Muyres	Sherwood Park, Alberta & Wadena, Saskatchewan
Courtney Woo	Daniel Wenzek	New Westminster, British Columbia
Samantha Yachiw-Omelian	Jordan Raymond	Saskatoon, Saskatchewan

==== Knockout Results ====
===== A Event =====
Qualifier 1
(Alberta) (Saskatchewan) Walker / Muyres	6
(Alberta) Sachkiw / Jacques	5	(Alberta) (Saskatchewan) Walker / Muyres	5
(Alberta) Sturmay / Kleibrink	4	(Ontario) Brunton / Horgan	4
(Ontario) Brunton / Horgan	5	(Alberta) (Saskatchewan) Walker / Muyres	7
(New Brunswick) (British Columbia) Armstrong / Griffith	5	(British Columbia) Cotter / Cotter	5
(Alberta) Munroe / Leong	4	(New Brunswick) (British Columbia) Armstrong / Griffith	2
(British Columbia) Cotter / Cotter	8	(British Columbia) Cotter / Cotter	7
(Manitoba) Lyburn / Lyburn	2	(Alberta) (Saskatchewan) Walker / Muyres	11
(Ontario) Jones / Laing	10	(Ontario) Jones / Laing	5
(Alberta) Cinnamon / Tao	3	(Ontario) Jones / Laing	7
(Alberta) Homan / Bottcher	9	(Alberta) Homan / Bottcher	6
(Saskatchewan) Barber / Heidt	4	(Ontario) Jones / Laing	7
(Manitoba) Lott / Lott	7	(Manitoba) Lott / Lott	4
(Saskatchewan) Just / Cherpin	5	(Manitoba) Lott / Lott	8
(Alberta) (Saskatchewan) Tran / Kleiter	6	(Alberta) (Saskatchewan) Tran / Kleiter	1
(British Columbia) Mackenzie / Middleton	4

Qualifier 2
(Alberta) Peterman / Gallant	9
(Alberta) Brissette / Parent	3	(Alberta) Peterman / Gallant	7
(Alberta) Sluchinski / Sluchinski	10	(Alberta) Sluchinski / Sluchinski	3
(Saskatchewan) Gamble / Kalthoff	5	(Alberta) Peterman / Gallant	7
(Alberta) Papley / van Amsterdam	4	(British Columbia) Woo / Wenzek	8
(Alberta) Skrlik / Harty	8	(Alberta) Skrlik / Harty	5
(New Brunswick) Adams / Robichaud	5	(British Columbia) Woo / Wenzek	9
(British Columbia) Woo / Wenzek	7	(British Columbia) Woo / Wenzek	5
(Saskatchewan) Martin / Laycock	8	(Quebec) Gagné / Morissette	7
(Alberta) Damen / van Amsterdam	2	(Saskatchewan) Martin / Laycock	6
(Nova Scotia) Powers / Saunders	9	(Nova Scotia) Powers / Saunders	7
(Alberta) Kalk / MacAlpine	6	(Nova Scotia) Powers / Saunders	4
(British Columbia) Reese-Hansen / Chester	9	(Quebec) Gagné / Morissette	5
(Saskatchewan) Yachiw-Omelian / Raymond	4	(British Columbia) Reese-Hansen / Chester	6
(Quebec) Gagné / Morissette	10	(Quebec) Gagné / Morissette	10
(Ontario) Mallett / Jackson	6

===== B Event =====
Qualifiers 3 & 5
(Alberta) Homan / Bottcher	8
(Alberta) Sachkiw / Jacques	6	(Alberta) Sturmay / Kleibrink	1
(Alberta) Sturmay / Kleibrink	7	(Alberta) Homan / Bottcher	2
(Alberta) Peterman / Gallant	8
(Alberta) Peterman / Gallant	8
(Nova Scotia) Powers / Saunders	2
(Alberta) (Saskatchewan) Tran / Kleiter	8
(Alberta) Munroe / Leong	10	(Alberta) Munroe / Leong	9
(Manitoba) Lyburn / Lyburn	2	(Alberta) Munroe / Leong	6
(Nova Scotia) Powers / Saunders	7
(Alberta) Peterman / Gallant	7
(Ontario) Jones / Laing	4
(Ontario) Brunton / Horgan	8
(Alberta) Cinnamon / Tao	6	(Saskatchewan) Barber / Heidt	3
(Saskatchewan) Barber / Heidt	7	(Ontario) Brunton / Horgan	9
(British Columbia) Mackenzie / Middleton	3
(New Brunswick) (British Columbia) Armstrong / Griffith	4
(Saskatchewan) Just / Cherpin	2	(British Columbia) Mackenzie / Middleton	9
(British Columbia) Mackenzie / Middleton	7	(Ontario) Brunton / Horgan	3
(Ontario) Jones / Laing	7

Qualifiers 4 & 6
(Saskatchewan) Martin / Laycock	8
(Alberta) Brissette / Parent	6	(Saskatchewan) Gamble / Kalthoff	5
(Saskatchewan) Gamble / Kalthoff	10	(Saskatchewan) Martin / Laycock	5
(British Columbia) Cotter / Cotter	4
(Saskatchewan) Martin / Laycock	4
(New Brunswick) Adams / Robichaud	6
(British Columbia) Reese-Hansen / Chester	6
(Alberta) Papley / van Amsterdam	1	(New Brunswick) Adams / Robichaud	7
(New Brunswick) Adams / Robichaud	10	(New Brunswick) Adams / Robichaud	6
(Manitoba) Lott / Lott	5
(New Brunswick) Adams / Robichaud	10
(Alberta) Skrlik / Harty	4
(Alberta) Sluchinski / Sluchinski	10
(Alberta) Damen / van Amsterdam	1	(Alberta) Kalk / MacAlpine	3
(Alberta) Kalk / MacAlpine	7	(Alberta) Sluchinski / Sluchinski	6
(Alberta) Skrlik / Harty	7
(Alberta) Skrlik / Harty	6
(Saskatchewan) Yachiw-Omelian / Raymond	9	(Saskatchewan) Yachiw-Omelian / Raymond	4
(Ontario) Mallett / Jackson	3	(Alberta) Skrlik / Harty	7
(British Columbia) Woo / Wenzek	6

===== C Event =====
Qualifier 7
(British Columbia) Cotter / Cotter	9
(Alberta) Sachkiw / Jacques	1	(Manitoba) Lyburn / Lyburn	4
(Manitoba) Lyburn / Lyburn	8	(British Columbia) Cotter / Cotter	7
(Saskatchewan) Gamble / Kalthoff	6
(Alberta) Sluchinski / Sluchinski	5
(Saskatchewan) Gamble / Kalthoff	8	(Saskatchewan) Gamble / Kalthoff	10
(British Columbia) Reese-Hansen / Chester	7

		Qualifier 8
(Alberta) Kalk / MacAlpine	3
(Saskatchewan) Yachiw-Omelian / Raymond	7	(Saskatchewan) Yachiw-Omelian / Raymond	2
		(Ontario) Brunton / Horgan	10

				Qualifier 9
(Alberta) Cinnamon / Tao	8
(Saskatchewan) Just / Cherpin	5	(Alberta) Cinnamon / Tao	4
		(Manitoba) Lott / Lott	8
				(Manitoba) Lott / Lott	8
				(Nova Scotia) Powers / Saunders	1

				Qualifier 10
(Alberta) Brissette / Parent	6
(Alberta) Papley / van Amsterdam	8	(Alberta) Papley / van Amsterdam	9
		(Alberta) Munroe / Leong	6
				(Alberta) Papley / van Amsterdam	6
				(British Columbia) Woo / Wenzek	4

		Qualifier 11
(Saskatchewan) Barber / Heidt	4
(New Brunswick) (British Columbia) Armstrong / Griffith	6	(New Brunswick) (British Columbia) Armstrong / Griffith	7
		(Saskatchewan) Martin / Laycock	5

Qualifier 12
(British Columbia) Mackenzie / Middleton	8
(Alberta) Sturmay / Kleibrink	3	(Alberta) (Saskatchewan) Tran / Kleiter	5
(Alberta) (Saskatchewan) Tran / Kleiter	12	(British Columbia) Mackenzie / Middleton	4
(Alberta) Homan / Bottcher	7
(Alberta) Homan / Bottcher	7
(Alberta) Damen / van Amsterdam	7	(Alberta) Damen / van Amsterdam	2
(Ontario) Mallett / Jackson	1

==== Playoffs ====
Round of 12
(Alberta) Papley / van Amsterdam	8
(New Brunswick) (British Columbia) Armstrong / Griffith	9
(Alberta) Skrlik / Harty	5
(Alberta) Homan / Bottcher	7
(Ontario) Brunton / Horgan	5
(Manitoba) Lott / Lott	6
(Ontario) Jones / Laing	7
(British Columbia) Cotter / Cotter	2

Quarterfinals
(Quebec) Gagné / Morissette	6
(New Brunswick) (British Columbia) Armstrong / Griffith	9
(Alberta) Peterman / Gallant	9
(Alberta) Homan / Bottcher	7
(Alberta) (Saskatchewan) Walker / Muyres	5
(Manitoba) Lott / Lott	9
(New Brunswick) Adams / Robichaud	5
(Ontario) Jones / Laing	6

Semifinals
(New Brunswick) (British Columbia) Armstrong / Griffith	2
(Alberta) Peterman / Gallant	5
(Manitoba) Lott / Lott	5
(Ontario) Jones / Laing	4

Final
(Alberta) Peterman / Gallant	6
(Manitoba) Lott / Lott	2
