= Brett Gallant =

Canadian curler (born 1990)

- Curler
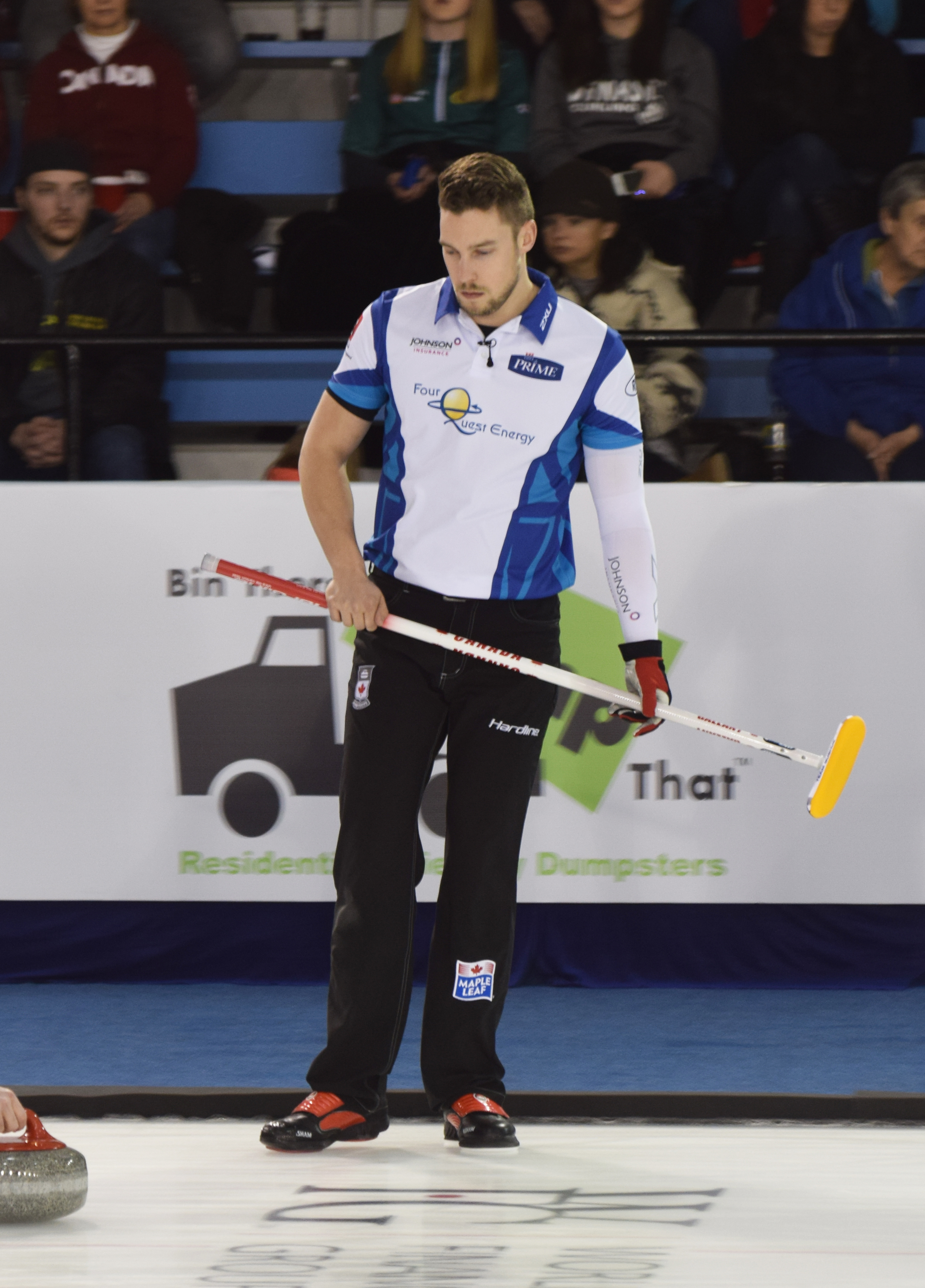
- Gallant in 2018
- Born: Brett Philip Gallant; February 18, 1990 (age 36); Charlottetown Royalty, Prince Edward Island, Canada
- Height: 188 cm (6 ft 2 in)

Team
- Curling club: The Glencoe Club, Calgary, AB
- Skip: Brad Jacobs
- Third: Marc Kennedy
- Second: Brett Gallant
- Lead: Ben Hebert
- Alternate: Tyler Tardi
- Mixed doubles partner: Jocelyn Peterman

Curling career
- Member Association: Prince Edward Island (2003–2012); Newfoundland and Labrador (2012–2022); Alberta (2022–present)
- Brier: 14 (2013, 2014, 2015, 2016, 2017, 2018, 2019, 2020, 2021, 2022, 2023, 2024, 2025, 2026)
- World Championship: 4 (2017, 2018, 2022, 2025)
- World Mixed Doubles Championship: 3 (2019, 2022, 2025)
- Pan Continental Championship: 1 (2025)
- Olympic: 2 (2022, 2026)
- Top CTRS ranking: 1st (2016–17, 2017–18, 2021–22, 2024–25, 2025–26)
- Grand Slam victories: 15 (2014 Masters, 2014 Canadian Open, 2015 National, 2016 Elite 10, 2016 Players', 2017 Canadian Open, 2017 Tour Challenge, 2017 Masters, 2018 Champions Cup, 2018 Elite 10 (Sept.), 2021 National, 2022 Champions Cup, 2023 Canadian Open, 2023 Champions Cup, 2026 National)
Medal record
Men's curling
Representing Canada
Winter Olympics
Gold medal – first place	2026 Milano Cortina	Team
Bronze medal – third place	2022 Beijing	Team
World Championships
Gold medal – first place	2017 Edmonton
Silver medal – second place	2018 Las Vegas
Silver medal – second place	2022 Las Vegas
Bronze medal – third place	2025 Moose Jaw
World Mixed Doubles Championship
Silver medal – second place	2019 Stavanger
Pan Continental Championships
Gold medal – first place	2025 Virginia
World Junior Championships
Silver medal – second place	2009 Vancouver
The Brier
Gold medal – first place	2018 Regina
Bronze medal – third place	2026 St. John's
Representing Newfoundland and Labrador
Canadian Olympic Curling Trials
Gold medal – first place	2021 Saskatoon
Bronze medal – third place	2017 Ottawa
Canadian Mixed Doubles Olympic Trials
Bronze medal – third place	2018 Portage la Prairie
The Brier
Gold medal – first place	2017 St. John's
Gold medal – first place	2020 Kingston
Silver medal – second place	2016 Ottawa
Canadian Mixed Doubles Championship
Gold medal – first place	2016 Saskatoon
Gold medal – first place	2019 Fredericton
Representing Alberta
Canadian Olympic Curling Trials
Gold medal – first place	2025 Halifax
Canadian Mixed Doubles Olympic Trials
Gold medal – first place	2025 Liverpool
The Brier
Gold medal – first place	2025 Kelowna
Bronze medal – third place	2024 Regina
Canadian Mixed Doubles Championship
Silver medal – second place	2023 Sudbury
Bronze medal – third place	2024 Fredericton
Representing Prince Edward Island
Canada Games
Bronze medal – third place	2007 Whitehorse
Representing (Newfoundland and Labrador) Wild Card
The Brier
Gold medal – first place	2022 Lethbridge
Representing (Alberta) Wild Card
The Brier
Bronze medal – third place	2023 London

Brett Philip Gallant (/ɡəˈlænt/ gə-LANT; born February 18, 1990, in Charlottetown, Prince Edward Island) is a Canadian curler from Chestermere, Alberta. He is the 2026 Milano Cortina Olympic gold medallist, a former World Champion, and 2022 Beijing Olympic bronze medallist. He currently plays second on Team Brad Jacobs.

== Career ==
=== Juniors ===
Gallant has represented Prince Edward Island in the Canadian Junior Curling Championships numerous times, winning the 2009 Canadian Junior Curling Championships on his fourth attempt. Gallant won five straight provincial titles in P.E.I. from 2006 to 2010. He holds the record for most all-time wins at the Canadian Juniors (48), which he set after his second win at the 2010 Canadian Junior Curling Championships. Gallant also won a bronze medal for P.E.I. at the 2007 Canada Games.

At the 2009 World Junior Curling Championships, Gallant represented Team Canada. After placing first after the round-robin, he lost in the final to Denmark's Rasmus Stjerne rink.

=== Men's ===
==== 2012–2022: Team Gushue ====
Gallant joined Brad Gushue's team during the 2012–13 season as the team's third and moved to Newfoundland and Labrador in the process. The team would win the 2013 Newfoundland and Labrador Tankard, sending them to the 2013 Tim Hortons Brier, Gallant's first. The team would make the playoffs with an 8–3 record. They would lose the 3 vs. 4 game to Northern Ontario's Brad Jacobs and the bronze medal game to Ontario's Glenn Howard. The Gushue rink failed to make the playoffs at the 2014 Tim Hortons Brier after going 6–5 in the round-robin. Mark Nichols rejoined the team for the following season, and Gallant moved to second on the team. They would improve on their best finish at the 2015 Tim Hortons Brier, where they lost in the semifinal to Team Canada, skipped by Pat Simmons. During the 2014–15 season, Gallant would also win his first Grand Slam of Curling event, the 2014 Masters and the 2014 Canadian Open.

The Gushue rink would win three more slams during the 2015–16 season, the 2015 National, the 2016 Elite 10 and the 2016 Players' Championship. With their successful tour season, the team entered the 2016 Tim Hortons Brier as the number one seed. They led Newfoundland and Labrador to a 9–2 round-robin record, earning them a spot in the 1 vs. 2 game. They would defeat Northern Ontario's Jacobs before losing to Alberta's Kevin Koe 9–5 in the final. The team finished second on the CTRS standings for the season, just behind the Koe rink.

Team Gushue added one more slam title during the 2016–17 season at the 2017 Canadian Open. The team would also have their most successful Brier to date at the 2017 Tim Hortons Brier, which was hosted in St. John's. They once again finished 9–2 in the round-robin and would win the 1 vs. 2 game over Manitoba's Mike McEwen rink. Tied 6–6 in the final end of the final against Koe, Gushue needed to draw a full eight-foot to win the title. The team swept it all the way down the sheet, and the stone was just close enough for the win. It was Newfoundland's first Brier title since 1976. The team represented Canada at the 2017 World Men's Curling Championship, where they went undefeated en route to capturing the gold medal. The whole Canadian team was named the All-Star Team for the tournament. This would earn them first place on the CTRS standings for the season.

The team followed this successful season up with another great season for the 2017–18 season. It did come with a bit of heartbreak, though, as the team lost the semifinal of the 2017 Canadian Olympic Curling Trials. They shook this off, though, able to win three more slams, the 2017 Tour Challenge, the 2017 Masters, and the 2018 Humpty's Champions Cup. His rink would defend their title at the 2018 Tim Hortons Brier. Representing Team Canada, they went 10–1 through the round-robin and championship pool and defeated Alberta's Brendan Bottcher 6–4 in the final. They would lose the final of the 2018 World Men's Curling Championship to Sweden's Niklas Edin team.

The team added a tenth slam title to their name at the 2018 Elite 10 (September) the following season. They would lose the 3 vs. 4 game of the 2019 Tim Hortons Brier to Bottcher's rink. On the tour, they lost in the finals of the 2018 China Open to Russia's Sergey Glukhov and the Stu Sells 1824 Halifax Classic to Scott Howard who was skipping the Glenn Howard team. They began their 2019–20 season at the 2019 AMJ Campbell Shorty Jenkins Classic, where they lost to eventual champions John Epping in the quarterfinals. They then lost in the semifinal of the Stu Sells Toronto Tankard to Brad Jacobs, who also went on to win the event. In Grand Slam play, the team didn't win any events but finished runner-up at both the 2019 Masters and the 2019 Tour Challenge and lost in the semifinals of the 2019 National and the 2020 Canadian Open. The team would win the 2020 Newfoundland and Labrador Tankard after not having to play in it for the previous two seasons. At the 2020 Tim Hortons Brier, the team finished 8–3, which qualified them for the 3 vs. 4 game. They would beat Brad Jacobs in the 3 vs. 4, Saskatchewan's Matt Dunstone in the semifinal, and Alberta's Bottcher rink in the final to win their third Brier title. The team was set to represent Canada once again at the 2020 World Men's Curling Championship before the event got cancelled due to the COVID-19 pandemic. The Brier would be their last event of the season as both the Players' Championship and the Champions Cup Grand Slam events were also cancelled due to the pandemic.

Team Gushue played in two events during the 2020–21 season, the Dave Jones Mayflower Cashspiel and the Stu Sells 1824 Halifax Classic, winning both. Representing Team Canada at the 2021 Tim Hortons Brier, they finished with an 8–4 record, not advancing to the playoffs for the first time since 2014.

Gallant's team, skipped by Brad Gushue, qualified as the Canadian representatives for the 2022 Winter Olympics by winning the 2021 Canadian Olympic Curling Trials, defeating Brad Jacobs 4–3 in the final. At the 2022 Olympics, the team won the bronze medal after beating the United States 8-5.

==== 2022–present: Move to Alberta ====
Gallant left the Gushue rink and moved to Alberta to join the Brendan Bottcher rink in Alberta for the 2022-23 curling season alongside Marc Kennedy and Ben Hebert. The team found success, winning two grand slam events, (2023 Canadian Open and 2023 Champions Cup), and finishing third in the 2023 and 2024 Briers. However, it was announced that the team would be parting ways with their former skip Brendan Bottcher, and adding Brad Jacobs as their new skip for the 2024–25 curling season. In their first season together, the newly formed Jacobs team enjoyed plenty of success, finishing second at the 2024 National and the 2025 Masters grand slam events. Like the previous season, the Jacobs team pre-qualified for the 2025 Brier based on their CTRS ranking, which meant they bypassed the provincial qualifiers. At the 2025 Montana's Brier, the Jacobs rink would go on to win the national championship, beating Dunstone in the final and qualifying to represent Canada at the 2025 World Men's Curling Championship. At the 2025 World's, the Jacobs rink would go 11–1 in round robin play, but would lose to Scotland's Bruce Mouat in the semi-final. The team would rebound to win the bronze medal, beating China's Xu Xiaoming 11–2 in the bronze medal game.

Team Jacobs would start the 2025–26 curling season winning the 2025 Pan Continental Curling Championships, beating John Shuster of the United States 7–3 in the final. They would also have a strong year on the grand slam tour, finishing as semifinalists at the 2025 Masters and 2025 GSOC Tahoe. Team Jacobs would again try to return to the Olympics at the 2025 Canadian Olympic Curling Trials. There, they would finish the round robin in first place with a 6–1 record, and would then beat Matt Dunstone in both games of their best-of-three final to represent Canada at the 2026 Winter Olympics.

=== Mixed doubles ===
In April 2016, Gallant and teammate Jocelyn Peterman won the 2016 Canadian Mixed Doubles Curling Trials after battling to a 12–8 win over Laura Crocker and Geoff Walker at the Nutana Curling Club in Saskatoon, Sask. The new champions were playing in their first Mixed Doubles event together. The pair played in the 2018 Canadian Mixed Doubles Curling Olympic Trials, going undefeated in group play, but lost to the eventual champion John Morris / Kaitlyn Lawes pairing in the semifinal. Peterman and Gallant also won the 2019 Canadian Mixed Doubles Curling Championship, defeating Nancy Martin and Tyrel Griffith in the final. The pair represented Canada at the 2019 World Mixed Doubles Curling Championship, where they won the silver medal after losing 6–5 to Sweden's Anna Hasselborg and Oskar Eriksson on the last rock. They would also perform well on the World Curling Tour, winning events such as the 2018 Battleford Mixed Doubles Fall Curling Classic and the 2019 China Open.

On March 2, 2022, Curling Canada announced that Peterman and Gallant would represent Canada at the 2022 World Mixed Doubles Curling Championship after the Canadian Mixed Doubles Championship was cancelled due to COVID. At the championship, the pair finished second in their pool with an 8–1 record, only suffering one loss to Scotland's Eve Muirhead and Bobby Lammie. This earned them a spot in the qualification game against Norway's Maia and Magnus Ramsfjell. After a tight game all the way through, Norway scored two in the final end to win the game 6–5, eliminating the Canadians in fifth place.

Peterman and Gallant went undefeated through the round robin of the 2023 Canadian Mixed Doubles Curling Championship with a 7–0 record. They then won both their quarterfinal and semifinal game to reach the final where they faced Jennifer Jones and Brent Laing. After a tight game all the way through, Jones and Laing scored five in the eighth end to win the game 9–4. Peterman and Gallant also competed in the 2024 Canadian Mixed Doubles Curling Championship, where they finished in third place.

By virtue of their third place finish at the 2024 Canadian Mixed Doubles Championships, Peterman and Gallant qualified for the 2025 Canadian Mixed Doubles Curling Olympic Trials, where the team went undefeated, beating the team of Rachel Homan and Brendan Bottcher 8-7 in the final, qualifying him and Peterman for the 2025 World Mixed Doubles Curling Championship. At the 2025 Worlds, Peterman and Gallant would finish in 6th place, earning enough points to directly qualify them to represent Canada at the 2026 Winter Olympics.

== Personal life ==
His parents are Kathie Gallant and Peter Gallant, former Canadian Mixed champions. Gallant began curling at age 4. In 2008, he graduated from Colonel Gray Senior High School, in Charlottetown, Prince Edward Island. He attended Memorial University in St. John's. He and his mixed doubles partner, Jocelyn Peterman, married on June 4, 2022. They have one child together. He graduated from the University of Prince Edward Island in 2018 with a Bachelor's Degree in Business Administration.

== Awards ==
- Brier: First Team All-Star, Second - 2018, 2023, 2024, 2025 and 2026
- Brier: Second Team All-Star, Second - 2019 and 2021
- World Men's Curling Championship: All-Star Second - 2017
- Gallant was named Senior Male Athlete of the Year and was awarded the Lieutenant Governor's Award (presented to the top overall Island athlete) at the 2016 Sport PEI Amateur Sport Awards.

== Teams ==
Season	Skip	Third	Second	Lead
2003–04	Brett Gallant	Mitch O'Shea	Matt Smith	Pat Callbeck
2005–06	Brett Gallant	Adam Casey	Anson Carmody	Alex MacFadyen
2006–07	Brett Gallant	Adam Casey	Anson Carmody	Alex MacFadyen
2007–08	Brett Gallant	Adam Casey	Anson Carmody	Alex MacFadyen
2008–09	Brett Gallant	Adam Casey	Anson Carmody	Jamie Danbrook
2009–10	Brett Gallant	Adam Casey	Anson Carmody	Alex MacFadyen
2010–11	Brett Gallant (Fourth)	Peter Gallant (Skip)	Anson Carmody	Jeff Wilson
2011–12	Brett Gallant	Eddie MacKenzie	Anson Carmody	Alex MacFadyen
2012–13	Brad Gushue	Brett Gallant	Adam Casey	Geoff Walker
2013–14	Brad Gushue	Brett Gallant	Adam Casey	Geoff Walker
2014–15	Brad Gushue	Mark Nichols	Brett Gallant	Geoff Walker
2015–16	Brad Gushue	Mark Nichols	Brett Gallant	Geoff Walker
2016–17	Brad Gushue	Mark Nichols	Brett Gallant	Geoff Walker
2017–18	Brad Gushue	Mark Nichols	Brett Gallant	Geoff Walker
2018–19	Brad Gushue	Mark Nichols	Brett Gallant	Geoff Walker
2019–20	Brad Gushue	Mark Nichols	Brett Gallant	Geoff Walker
2020–21	Brad Gushue	Mark Nichols	Brett Gallant	Joel Krats (Note: Krats replaced Walker in the 2020 Dave Jones Mayflower Cashspiel.); Ryan McNeil Lamswood (Note: McNeil Lamswood replaced Walker in the 2020 Stu Sells 1824 Halifax Classic.); Geoff Walker
2021–22	Brad Gushue	Mark Nichols	Brett Gallant	Geoff Walker
2022–23	Brendan Bottcher	Marc Kennedy	Brett Gallant	Ben Hebert
2023–24	Brendan Bottcher	Marc Kennedy	Brett Gallant	Ben Hebert
2024–25	Brad Jacobs	Marc Kennedy	Brett Gallant	Ben Hebert
2025–26	Brad Jacobs	Marc Kennedy	Brett Gallant	Ben Hebert
2026–27	Brad Jacobs	Marc Kennedy	Brett Gallant	Ben Hebert
