= 2020 Canadian Mixed Curling Championship =

Curling tournament

- Host city: Jonquière, Saguenay, Quebec
- Arena: Foyer des loisirs et de la culture
- Dates: November 3–9, 2019
- Winner: Quebec
- Curling club: CC des Collines, Chelsea & CC Etchemin, Saint-Romuald
- Skip: Jean-Sébastien Roy
- Third: Amélie Blais
- Second: Dan deWaard
- Lead: Brenda Nicholls
- Finalist: New Brunswick (Odishaw)

The 2020 Canadian Mixed Curling Championship was held from November 3 to 9, 2019 at the Foyer des loisirs et de la culture in Jonquière, Saguenay, Quebec.

Quebec won the event, having gone undefeated throughout the tournament. It was only the second championship for La Belle Province. Quebec skip Jean-Sébastien Roy had home ice advantage as a native of Jonquière.

== Teams ==
The teams are listed as follows:

Team	Skip	Third	Second	Lead	Locale
Alberta	Warren Cross	Erica Wiese	Cody Bartlett	Ashley Kalk	Saville Community Sports Centre, Edmonton
British Columbia	Cameron de Jong	Taylor Reese-Hansen	Alex Horvath	Mariah Coulombe	Victoria Curling Club, Victoria
Manitoba	Corey Chambers	Lisa McLeod	Nigel Milnes	Jolene Callum	Miami Curling Club, Miami
New Brunswick	Grant Odishaw	Sylvie Quillian	Marc LeCocq	Jane Boyle	Curl Moncton, Moncton
Newfoundland and Labrador	Cory Schuh	Erin Porter	Andrew Taylor	Brooke Godsland	RE/MAX Centre, St. John's
Northern Ontario	Sandy MacEwan	Laura Johnston	Gavan Jamieson	Amanda Corkal	North Bay Granite Club, North Bay
Northwest Territories	Jamie Koe	Kerry Galusha	David Aho	Megan Koehler	Yellowknife Curling Club, Yellowknife
Nova Scotia	Peter Burgess	Colleen Jones	Luke Saunders	Lindsey Burgess	Truro Curling Club, Truro
Nunavut	Wade Kingdon	Alison Griffin	Dennis Masson	Megan Ingram	Iqaluit Curling Club, Iqaluit
Ontario	Wayne Tuck Jr.	Kimberly Tuck	Jake Higgs	Sara Gatchell	Ilderton Curling Club, Ilderton
Prince Edward Island	Jamie Newson	Melissa Morrow	Andrew MacDougall	Miranda Ellis	Silver Fox Curling Club, Summerside
Quebec	Jean-Sébastien Roy	Amélie Blais	Dan deWaard	Brenda Nicholls	Curling des Collines, Chelsea; Club Curling Etchemin, Lévis
Saskatchewan	Shaun Meachem	Kelly Schafer	Chris Haichert	Teejay Haichert	Swift Current Curling Club, Swift Current
Yukon	Thomas Scoffin	Helen Strong	Wade Scoffin	Kim Brown	Whitehorse Curling Club, Whitehorse

== Round robin standings ==
Final Round robin standings

Key
Teams to Championship Pool

Pool A	Skip	W	L
Northwest Territories	Jamie Koe	4	2
Newfoundland and Labrador	Cory Schuh	4	2
Saskatchewan	Shaun Meachem	4	2
Ontario	Wayne Tuck Jr.	4	2
Alberta	Warren Cross	3	3
Nova Scotia	Peter Burgess	2	4
Nunavut	Wade Kingdon	0	6

Pool B	Skip	W	L
Quebec	Jean-Sébastien Roy	6	0
New Brunswick	Grant Odishaw	5	1
Manitoba	Corey Chambers	3	3
British Columbia	Cameron de Jong	3	3
Prince Edward Island	Jamie Newson	2	4
Northern Ontario	Sandy MacEwan	1	5
Yukon	Thomas Scoffin	1	5

== Round robin results ==
All draws are listed in Eastern Time (UTC−04:00).

=== Draw 1 ===
Sunday, November 3, 6:30 pm

Sheet A	1	2	3	4	5	6	7	8	Final
Ontario (Tuck)	3	0	2	1	4	0	1	X	11
Northwest Territories (Koe)	0	1	0	0	0	3	0	X	4

Sheet B	1	2	3	4	5	6	7	8	Final
Alberta (Cross)	0	0	0	1	0	2	0	3	6
Nova Scotia (Burgess)	0	2	1	0	1	0	1	0	5

Sheet C	1	2	3	4	5	6	7	8	Final
Saskatchewan (Meachem)	0	3	0	0	0	2	0	0	5
Newfoundland and Labrador (Schuh)	1	0	0	1	1	0	3	4	10

Sheet D	1	2	3	4	5	6	7	8	Final
Yukon (Scoffin)	0	1	0	1	0	1	X	X	3
Quebec (Roy)	1	0	7	0	3	0	X	X	11

Sheet E	1	2	3	4	5	6	7	8	Final
New Brunswick (Odishaw)	1	1	0	0	0	5	0	X	7
Northern Ontario (MacEwan)	0	0	1	1	0	0	1	X	3

=== Draw 2 ===
Monday, November 4, 2:00 pm

Sheet B	1	2	3	4	5	6	7	8	Final
Saskatchewan (Meachem)	2	0	3	0	0	1	1	X	7
Nunavut (Kingdon)	0	1	0	0	2	0	0	X	3

Sheet C	1	2	3	4	5	6	7	8	9	Final
Northwest Territories (Koe)	0	1	0	0	2	0	0	2	0	5
Nova Scotia (Burgess)	1	0	1	2	0	1	0	0	2	7

Sheet D	1	2	3	4	5	6	7	8	Final
New Brunswick (Odishaw)	0	0	3	0	5	1	0	0	9
Prince Edward Island (Newson)	1	1	0	2	0	0	2	1	7

Sheet E	1	2	3	4	5	6	7	8	Final
British Columbia (de Jong)	1	0	2	0	2	0	0	0	5
Manitoba (Chambers)	0	2	0	1	0	3	1	1	8

=== Draw 3 ===
Monday, November 4, 7:00 pm

Sheet A	1	2	3	4	5	6	7	8	Final
Newfoundland and Labrador (Schuh)	0	0	0	0	0	2	0	X	2
Alberta (Cross)	2	1	1	1	2	0	4	X	11

Sheet B	1	2	3	4	5	6	7	8	Final
Yukon (Scoffin)	0	0	0	0	0	1	0	X	1
Manitoba (Chambers)	0	0	0	2	1	0	2	X	5

Sheet C	1	2	3	4	5	6	7	8	Final
Ontario (Tuck)	3	1	0	1	0	0	3	X	8
Nunavut (Kingdon)	0	0	0	0	0	1	0	X	1

Sheet D	1	2	3	4	5	6	7	8	Final
Northern Ontario (MacEwan)	1	0	0	1	0	1	0	X	3
British Columbia (de Jong)	0	1	0	0	3	0	3	X	7

Sheet E	1	2	3	4	5	6	7	8	Final
Quebec (Roy)	5	0	0	2	2	0	1	X	10
Prince Edward Island (Newson)	0	1	1	0	0	1	0	X	3

=== Draw 4 ===
Tuesday, November 5, 9:30 am

Sheet A	1	2	3	4	5	6	7	8	Final
New Brunswick (Odishaw)	1	0	1	0	1	2	0	3	8
Yukon (Scoffin)	0	2	0	1	0	0	2	0	5

Sheet C	1	2	3	4	5	6	7	8	Final
Manitoba (Chambers)	3	0	1	1	1	0	0	2	8
Northern Ontario (MacEwan)	0	1	0	0	0	3	0	0	4

Sheet D	1	2	3	4	5	6	7	8	Final
Northwest Territories (Koe)	1	0	1	0	2	0	2	3	9
Saskatchewan (Meachem)	0	1	0	2	0	2	0	0	5

Sheet E	1	2	3	4	5	6	7	8	9	Final
Newfoundland and Labrador (Schuh)	1	0	0	2	1	0	1	0	1	6
Nova Scotia (Burgess)	0	1	0	0	0	3	0	1	0	5

=== Draw 5 ===
Tuesday, November 5, 2:00 pm

Sheet A	1	2	3	4	5	6	7	8	Final
Nova Scotia (Burgess)	0	0	0	3	0	3	0	0	6
Saskatchewan (Meachem)	1	1	3	0	2	0	0	1	8

Sheet B	1	2	3	4	5	6	7	8	Final
Northern Ontario (MacEwan)	0	0	1	0	0	0	1	X	2
Quebec (Roy)	2	2	0	2	1	2	0	X	9

Sheet C	1	2	3	4	5	6	7	8	Final
Prince Edward Island (Newson)	1	0	0	0	1	0	1	X	3
British Columbia (de Jong)	0	1	2	2	0	2	0	X	7

Sheet D	1	2	3	4	5	6	7	8	Final
Newfoundland and Labrador (Schuh)	0	2	1	0	2	0	0	2	7
Ontario (Tuck)	1	0	0	2	0	0	2	0	5

Sheet E	1	2	3	4	5	6	7	8	Final
Nunavut (Kingdon)	0	0	1	0	0	1	1	0	3
Alberta (Cross)	2	1	0	0	1	0	0	3	7

=== Draw 6 ===
Tuesday, November 5, 7:00 pm

Sheet A	1	2	3	4	5	6	7	8	9	Final
British Columbia (de Jong)	0	2	0	2	0	2	0	3	0	9
Quebec (Roy)	1	0	1	0	3	0	4	0	1	10

Sheet B	1	2	3	4	5	6	7	8	Final
Nunavut (Kingdon)	0	0	1	0	0	1	X	X	2
Northwest Territories (Koe)	4	1	0	3	2	0	X	X	10

Sheet C	1	2	3	4	5	6	7	8	Final
Alberta (Cross)	0	0	1	0	1	1	0	X	3
Ontario (Tuck)	0	5	0	1	0	0	3	X	9

Sheet D	1	2	3	4	5	6	7	8	Final
Manitoba (Chambers)	0	1	0	0	1	0	1	0	3
New Brunswick (Odishaw)	0	0	1	0	0	2	0	1	4

Sheet E	1	2	3	4	5	6	7	8	Final
Prince Edward Island (Newson)	0	2	0	1	0	0	1	0	4
Yukon (Scoffin)	2	0	1	0	1	2	0	1	7

=== Draw 7 ===
Wednesday, November 6, 9:30 am

Sheet A	1	2	3	4	5	6	7	8	Final
Manitoba (Chambers)	0	1	1	0	0	0	0	X	2
Prince Edward Island (Newson)	2	0	0	2	1	1	2	X	8

Sheet B	1	2	3	4	5	6	7	8	Final
British Columbia (de Jong)	0	0	2	0	2	0	2	0	6
New Brunswick (Odishaw)	1	1	0	1	0	3	0	1	7

Sheet C	1	2	3	4	5	6	7	8	Final
Northern Ontario (MacEwan)	1	0	0	2	2	0	0	1	6
Yukon (Scoffin)	0	1	1	0	0	1	1	0	4

Sheet D	1	2	3	4	5	6	7	8	Final
Nova Scotia (Burgess)	1	0	1	3	1	1	0	X	7
Nunavut (Kingdon)	0	1	0	0	0	0	1	X	2

Sheet E	1	2	3	4	5	6	7	8	9	Final
Ontario (Tuck)	1	0	1	1	0	0	0	1	0	4
Saskatchewan (Meachem)	0	1	0	0	1	1	1	0	1	5

=== Draw 8 ===
Wednesday, November 6, 2:00 pm

Sheet A	1	2	3	4	5	6	7	8	Final
Nunavut (Kingdon)	0	1	0	1	0	0	0	X	2
Newfoundland and Labrador (Schuh)	2	0	3	0	0	1	3	X	9

Sheet B	1	2	3	4	5	6	7	8	Final
Prince Edward Island (Newson)	0	0	1	0	0	3	1	2	7
Northern Ontario (MacEwan)	3	1	0	0	1	0	0	0	5

Sheet C	1	2	3	4	5	6	7	8	Final
Quebec (Roy)	2	0	0	1	0	1	1	X	5
New Brunswick (Odishaw)	0	0	1	0	1	0	0	X	2

Sheet D	1	2	3	4	5	6	7	8	Final
Alberta (Cross)	0	1	0	2	0	0	1	X	4
Northwest Territories (Koe)	3	0	2	0	2	2	0	X	9

=== Draw 9 ===
Wednesday, November 6, 7:00 pm

Sheet A	1	2	3	4	5	6	7	8	Final
Yukon (Scoffin)	2	0	0	0	0	1	0	X	3
British Columbia (de Jong)	0	1	3	1	1	0	3	X	9

Sheet B	1	2	3	4	5	6	7	8	9	Final
Nova Scotia (Burgess)	0	0	0	3	0	0	2	1	0	6
Ontario (Tuck)	2	0	0	0	3	1	0	0	1	7

Sheet C	1	2	3	4	5	6	7	8	Final
Saskatchewan (Meachem)	2	0	0	0	4	2	1	X	9
Alberta (Cross)	0	0	1	1	0	0	0	X	2

Sheet D	1	2	3	4	5	6	7	8	Final
Quebec (Roy)	4	2	0	1	0	2	0	X	9
Manitoba (Chambers)	0	0	1	0	1	0	0	X	2

Sheet E	1	2	3	4	5	6	7	8	Final
Northwest Territories (Koe)	0	2	0	4	3	0	2	X	11
Newfoundland and Labrador (Schuh)	0	0	1	0	0	2	0	X	3

== Placement round ==
=== Seeding pool ===
==== Standings ====
Final Seeding Pool Standings

Team	Skip	W	L
Alberta	Warren Cross	5	4
Nova Scotia	Peter Burgess	4	5
Yukon	Thomas Scoffin	3	6
Prince Edward Island	Jamie Newson	3	6
Northern Ontario	Sandy MacEwan	2	7
Nunavut	Wade Kingdon	1	8

==== Results ====
===== Draw 10 =====
Thursday, November 7, 9:30 am

Sheet B	1	2	3	4	5	6	7	8	Final
Alberta (Cross)	0	0	2	0	2	0	0	1	5
Yukon (Scoffin)	1	3	0	1	0	0	1	0	6

Sheet C	1	2	3	4	5	6	7	8	Final
Nunavut (Kingdon)	2	0	0	1	2	0	0	X	5
Prince Edward Island (Newson)	0	2	1	0	0	7	1	X	11

Sheet D	1	2	3	4	5	6	7	8	Final
Northern Ontario (MacEwan)	0	0	1	1	0	0	1	0	3
Nova Scotia (Burgess)	0	1	0	0	0	0	0	3	4

===== Draw 11 =====
Thursday, November 7, 2:00 pm

Sheet A	1	2	3	4	5	6	7	8	9	Final
Alberta (Cross)	2	1	0	0	0	1	0	0	1	5
Northern Ontario (MacEwan)	0	0	1	0	0	0	1	2	0	4

===== Draw 12 =====
Thursday, November 7, 7:00 pm

Sheet B	1	2	3	4	5	6	7	8	Final
Nova Scotia (Burgess)	0	2	0	2	0	1	0	1	6
Prince Edward Island (Newson)	1	0	1	0	1	0	1	0	4

===== Draw 13 =====
Friday, November 8, 9:30 am

Sheet B	1	2	3	4	5	6	7	8	Final
Nunavut (Kingdon)	1	0	2	0	1	0	0	X	4
Northern Ontario (MacEwan)	0	4	0	1	0	2	0	X	7

Sheet C	1	2	3	4	5	6	7	8	Final
Nova Scotia (Burgess)	0	0	1	0	0	0	1	0	2
Yukon (Scoffin)	1	0	0	1	0	2	0	1	5

Sheet D	1	2	3	4	5	6	7	8	Final
Prince Edward Island (Newson)	0	2	0	1	0	2	0	X	5
Alberta (Cross)	2	0	0	0	4	0	2	X	8

===== Draw 15 =====
Friday, November 8, 7:00 pm

Sheet E	1	2	3	4	5	6	7	8	Final
Yukon (Scoffin)	0	2	0	0	1	0	4	0	7
Nunavut (Kingdon)	1	0	0	3	0	2	0	2	8

=== Championship pool ===
==== Standings ====
Final Championship Pool Standings

Key
Teams to Playoffs

Team	Skip	W	L
Quebec	Jean-Sébastien Roy	10	0
New Brunswick	Grant Odishaw	8	2
Northwest Territories	Jamie Koe	6	4
Manitoba	Corey Chambers	6	4
Saskatchewan	Shaun Meachem	5	5
British Columbia	Cameron de Jong	5	5
Ontario	Wayne Tuck Jr.	5	5
Newfoundland and Labrador	Cory Schuh	4	6

==== Results ====
===== Draw 11 =====
Thursday, November 7, 2:00 pm

Sheet B	1	2	3	4	5	6	7	8	Final
Ontario (Tuck)	0	1	0	0	2	0	2	0	5
Quebec (Roy)	1	0	1	1	0	2	0	1	6

Sheet C	1	2	3	4	5	6	7	8	Final
Northwest Territories (Koe)	0	1	1	1	0	2	0	1	6
British Columbia (de Jong)	2	0	0	0	1	0	2	0	5

Sheet D	1	2	3	4	5	6	7	8	9	Final
Saskatchewan (Meachem)	0	1	0	2	0	0	1	0	0	4
New Brunswick (Odishaw)	1	0	1	0	0	1	0	1	1	5

Sheet E	1	2	3	4	5	6	7	8	Final
Newfoundland and Labrador (Schuh)	0	1	0	1	0	2	1	X	5
Manitoba (Chambers)	2	0	3	0	2	0	0	X	7

===== Draw 12 =====
Thursday, November 7, 7:00 pm

Sheet A	1	2	3	4	5	6	7	8	Final
Manitoba (Chambers)	0	0	0	1	0	0	0	X	1
Northwest Territories (Koe)	0	1	0	0	0	2	1	X	4

Sheet C	1	2	3	4	5	6	7	8	Final
Quebec (Roy)	4	1	0	1	2	1	X	X	9
Saskatchewan (Meachem)	0	0	2	0	0	0	X	X	2

Sheet D	1	2	3	4	5	6	7	8	Final
British Columbia (de Jong)	0	0	0	2	0	3	0	1	6
Newfoundland and Labrador (Schuh)	0	2	1	0	0	0	2	0	5

Sheet E	1	2	3	4	5	6	7	8	Final
New Brunswick (Odishaw)	0	0	2	0	1	0	X	X	3
Ontario (Tuck)	5	1	0	1	0	2	X	X	9

===== Draw 14 =====
Friday, November 8, 2:00 pm

Sheet A	1	2	3	4	5	6	7	8	Final
Newfoundland and Labrador (Schuh)	0	0	0	0	0	0	X	X	0
Quebec (Roy)	0	1	1	0	1	4	X	X	7

Sheet B	1	2	3	4	5	6	7	8	Final
Northwest Territories (Koe)	1	0	1	0	0	0	1	0	3
New Brunswick (Odishaw)	0	0	0	1	1	0	0	2	4

Sheet C	1	2	3	4	5	6	7	8	Final
Ontario (Tuck)	0	0	1	1	1	0	2	0	5
Manitoba (Chambers)	2	2	0	0	0	4	0	1	9

Sheet E	1	2	3	4	5	6	7	8	9	Final
Saskatchewan (Meachem)	1	0	1	0	1	0	0	1	1	5
British Columbia (de Jong)	0	1	0	1	0	2	0	0	0	4

===== Draw 15 =====
Friday, November 8, 7:00 pm

Sheet A	1	2	3	4	5	6	7	8	Final
British Columbia (de Jong)	2	0	3	1	0	0	0	0	6
Ontario (Tuck)	0	1	0	0	1	1	1	1	5

Sheet B	1	2	3	4	5	6	7	8	9	Final
Manitoba (Chambers)	0	1	1	0	0	2	2	0	2	8
Saskatchewan (Meachem)	2	0	0	1	2	0	0	1	0	6

Sheet C	1	2	3	4	5	6	7	8	Final
New Brunswick (Odishaw)	3	2	2	0	1	1	0	X	9
Newfoundland and Labrador (Schuh)	0	0	0	1	0	0	2	X	3

Sheet D	1	2	3	4	5	6	7	8	9	Final
Quebec (Roy)	0	2	0	2	0	1	0	1	1	7
Northwest Territories (Koe)	2	0	3	0	0	0	1	0	0	6

== Playoffs ==
Semifinals
1	Quebec	8
4	Manitoba	5
2	New Brunswick	7
3	Northwest Territories	6

Final
1	Quebec	6
2	New Brunswick	5

Bronze medal game
4	Manitoba	5
3	Northwest Territories	7

=== Semifinals ===
Saturday, November 9, 9:30 am

Sheet C	1	2	3	4	5	6	7	8	Final
Quebec (Roy)	2	0	2	1	0	2	0	1	8
Manitoba (Chambers)	0	1	0	0	3	0	1	0	5

Sheet D	1	2	3	4	5	6	7	8	Final
New Brunswick (Odishaw)	3	0	2	0	0	1	1	0	7
Northwest Territories (Koe)	0	3	0	1	1	0	0	1	6

=== Bronze medal game ===
Saturday, November 9, 2:30 pm

Sheet D	1	2	3	4	5	6	7	8	Final
Manitoba (Chambers)	0	2	0	1	0	2	0	X	5
Northwest Territories (Koe)	1	0	2	0	2	0	2	X	7

=== Final ===
Saturday, November 9, 2:30 pm

Sheet C	1	2	3	4	5	6	7	8	Final
Quebec (Roy)	1	0	1	1	0	3	0	0	6
New Brunswick (Odishaw)	0	1	0	0	1	0	1	2	5
