= 2009 Canadian Mixed Curling Championship =

- Host city: Iqaluit, Nunavut
- Arena: Arniatok Arena
- Dates: November 9–16, 2008
- Winner: Manitoba
- Curling club: Deer Lodge CC, Winnipeg
- Skip: Sean Grassie
- Third: Allison Nimik
- Second: Ross Derksen
- Lead: Kendra Green
- Finalist: Ontario (Wayne Tuck, Jr.)

The 2009 Canadian Mixed Curling Championship was held from November 9 to 16, 2008 at the Arniatok Arena in Iqaluit, Nunavut. It was the first national championships of any sport to be held in Nunavut.

Team Manitoba, consisting of Sean Grassie, Allison Nimik, Ross Derksen and Krendra Green won its eighth national mixed title. Two members of the winning team (Grassie and Nimik) represented Canada at the 2009 World Mixed Doubles Curling Championship, where they won a bronze medal.

== Teams ==
The teams are as follows:

Team	Skip	Third	Second	Lead	Alternate	Locale
Alberta	Tom Appelman	Kalynn Park	Branden Klassen	Rachelle Pidherny		Saville SC, Edmonton
British Columbia	Greg Monkman	Susan Allen	Randie Shen	Anita Cochrane		Royal City CC, New Westminster
Manitoba	Sean Grassie	Allison Nimik	Ross Derksen	Kendra Green		Deer Lodge CC, Winnipeg
New Brunswick	Scott Jones	Sandy Comeau	Pierre Fraser	Stephanie Taylor		Beaver CC, Moncton
Newfoundland and Labrador	Andrew Mercer	Jillian Waite	Scott Davidge	Tiffany Cuthbert		RE/MAX Centre, St. John's
Northern Ontario	Ian Fisher	Lindsay Miners	Caleb Flaxey	Christine Fortin		Soo Curlers Association, Sault Ste. Marie
Northwest Territories	George Lennie	Donna Maring	Edgar Maring	Diane Baxter		Inuvik CC, Inuvik
Nova Scotia	Mark Dacey	Heather Smith-Dacey	David Stephenson	Lisa Stephenson		Mayflower CC, Halifax
Ontario	Wayne Tuck, Jr.	Kimberly Tuck	Jake Higgs	Sara Jane Gatchell		Brantford G&CC, Brantford
Prince Edward Island	Bill Hope	Sandy Hope	Jeffery Gallant	Shelley Ebbett		Charlottetown CC, Charlottetown
Quebec	Simon Hebert	Noémie Audet-Verreault	Nicolas Marceau	Vicky Tremblay	Ed Sattelberger	Thetford Mines G&CC, Thetford Mines
Saskatchewan	Darrell McKee	Allison Gerhardt	Jason Jacobson	Amanda Jacobson		Nutana CC, Saskatoon

== Round-robin standings ==
Final round-robin standings

Key
Teams to Playoffs
Teams to Tiebreaker

Province	Skip	W	L
Manitoba	Sean Grassie	10	1
Saskatchewan	Darrell McKee	9	2
Ontario	Wayne Tuck, Jr.	8	3
Nova Scotia	Mark Dacey	8	3
Northern Ontario	Ian Fisher	6	5
British Columbia	Greg Monkman	5	6
Prince Edward Island	Bill Hope	5	6
New Brunswick	Scott Jones	5	6
Quebec	Simon Hebert	4	7
Alberta	Tom Appelman	3	8
Newfoundland and Labrador	Andrew Mercer	3	8
Northwest Territories	George Lennie	0	11

== Results ==
=== Draw 1 ===
Sheet A	1	2	3	4	5	6	7	8	9	10	Final
Prince Edward Island (Hope)	0	0	0	1	0	0	3	0	2	0	6
Northern Ontario (Fisher) 🔨	0	2	2	0	1	1	0	2	0	1	9

Sheet B	1	2	3	4	5	6	7	8	9	10	Final
Ontario (Tuck) 🔨	0	1	0	0	0	0	0	1	0	X	2
Manitoba (Grassie)	0	0	0	0	1	1	2	0	4	X	8

Sheet C	1	2	3	4	5	6	7	8	9	10	Final
British Columbia (Monkman) 🔨	0	1	0	0	2	0	1	0	0	1	5
Northwest Territories (Lennie)	1	0	0	1	0	1	0	1	0	0	4

Sheet D	1	2	3	4	5	6	7	8	9	10	Final
Newfoundland and Labrador (Mercer)	0	1	0	0	2	0	0	0	1	X	4
Saskatchewan (McKee) 🔨	2	0	1	0	0	4	0	1	0	X	8

=== Draw 2 ===
Sheet B	1	2	3	4	5	6	7	8	9	10	Final
Alberta (Appelman)	0	1	0	0	1	0	X	X	X	X	2
British Columbia (Monkman) 🔨	4	0	2	4	0	0	X	X	X	X	10

Sheet C	1	2	3	4	5	6	7	8	9	10	Final
Saskatchewan (McKee) 🔨	1	0	3	1	0	1	0	0	4	X	10
Prince Edward Island (Hope)	0	1	0	0	1	0	2	1	0	X	5

Sheet D	1	2	3	4	5	6	7	8	9	10	Final
Nova Scotia (Dacey)	2	1	2	0	1	1	2	X	X	X	9
Quebec (Hebert) 🔨	0	0	0	2	0	0	0	X	X	X	2

=== Draw 3 ===
Sheet A	1	2	3	4	5	6	7	8	9	10	Final
New Brunswick (Jones)	0	0	3	0	0	0	2	0	4	X	9
Alberta (Appelman) 🔨	1	1	0	0	0	1	0	1	0	X	4

Sheet B	1	2	3	4	5	6	7	8	9	10	Final
Quebec (Hebert) 🔨	1	0	3	0	0	4	3	X	X	X	11
Northwest Territories (Lennie)	0	1	0	0	2	0	0	X	X	X	3

Sheet C	1	2	3	4	5	6	7	8	9	10	Final
Manitoba (Grassie) 🔨	0	1	0	2	0	0	0	2	0	2	7
Nova Scotia (Dacey)	0	0	1	0	2	0	1	0	1	0	5

Sheet D	1	2	3	4	5	6	7	8	9	10	Final
Northern Ontario (Fisher)	0	1	1	0	1	0	1	1	0	X	5
Ontario (Tuck) 🔨	3	0	0	1	0	2	0	0	2	X	8

=== Draw 4 ===
Sheet A	1	2	3	4	5	6	7	8	9	10	Final
British Columbia (Monkman)	0	1	0	0	0	1	0	1	X	X	3
Saskatchewan (McKee) 🔨	1	0	1	2	1	0	2	0	X	X	7

Sheet B	1	2	3	4	5	6	7	8	9	10	Final
Newfoundland and Labrador (Mercer)	0	0	2	1	0	0	2	0	0	2	7
Northern Ontario (Fisher) 🔨	3	1	0	0	0	1	0	2	1	0	8

Sheet C	1	2	3	4	5	6	7	8	9	10	Final
Ontario (Tuck) 🔨	2	0	1	2	2	2	X	X	X	X	9
New Brunswick (Jones)	0	1	0	0	0	0	X	X	X	X	1

=== Draw 5 ===
Sheet A	1	2	3	4	5	6	7	8	9	10	Final
Northern Ontario (Fisher) 🔨	5	0	3	3	0	0	X	X	X	X	11
Northwest Territories (Lennie)	0	1	0	0	0	1	X	X	X	X	2

Sheet B	1	2	3	4	5	6	7	8	9	10	Final
Manitoba (Grassie) 🔨	0	0	3	0	2	0	0	2	1	X	8
New Brunswick (Jones)	0	0	0	1	0	0	2	0	0	X	3

Sheet C	1	2	3	4	5	6	7	8	9	10	Final
Quebec (Hebert)	2	0	0	0	0	0	0	1	0	2	5
British Columbia (Monkman) 🔨	0	0	1	0	0	1	0	0	2	0	4

Sheet D	1	2	3	4	5	6	7	8	9	10	Final
Saskatchewan (McKee)	1	1	3	0	0	1	0	0	3	X	9
Alberta (Appelman) 🔨	0	0	0	1	1	0	3	1	0	X	6

=== Draw 6 ===
Sheet A	1	2	3	4	5	6	7	8	9	10	Final
Alberta (Appelman)	0	0	1	0	1	1	0	0	0	0	3
Prince Edward Island (Hope) 🔨	1	0	0	1	0	0	1	1	0	1	5

Sheet B	1	2	3	4	5	6	7	8	9	10	Final
Nova Scotia (Dacey) 🔨	0	1	0	1	0	1	0	1	1	0	5
Saskatchewan (McKee)	0	0	2	0	2	0	1	0	0	2	7

Sheet C	1	2	3	4	5	6	7	8	9	10	Final
Northwest Territories (Lennie)	1	0	1	0	0	0	1	0	X	X	3
Manitoba (Grassie) 🔨	0	4	0	2	0	2	0	4	X	X	12

Sheet D	1	2	3	4	5	6	7	8	9	10	Final
Ontario (Tuck)	1	0	4	0	0	3	0	1	X	X	9
Newfoundland and Labrador (Mercer) 🔨	0	1	0	1	0	0	1	0	X	X	3

=== Draw 7 ===
Sheet A	1	2	3	4	5	6	7	8	9	10	11	Final
Newfoundland and Labrador (Mercer)	1	0	0	0	1	0	0	1	1	0	1	5
Quebec (Hebert) 🔨	0	0	3	0	0	0	0	0	0	1	0	4

Sheet B	1	2	3	4	5	6	7	8	9	10	Final
British Columbia (Monkman)	2	0	0	1	0	2	0	0	2	1	8
Ontario (Tuck) 🔨	0	2	1	0	2	0	1	0	0	0	6

Sheet C	1	2	3	4	5	6	7	8	9	10	Final
Prince Edward Island (Hope)	0	0	0	1	0	1	0	0	X	X	2
Nova Scotia (Dacey) 🔨	2	0	0	0	4	0	2	2	X	X	10

Sheet D	1	2	3	4	5	6	7	8	9	10	Final
New Brunswick (Jones)	0	1	0	2	0	0	X	X	X	X	3
Northern Ontario (Fisher) 🔨	4	0	1	0	1	4	X	X	X	X	10

=== Draw 8 ===
Sheet A	1	2	3	4	5	6	7	8	9	10	Final
Prince Edward Island (Hope)	0	1	0	0	1	0	2	0	1	X	5
Ontario (Tuck) 🔨	1	0	3	1	0	2	0	1	0	X	8

Sheet B	1	2	3	4	5	6	7	8	9	10	Final
Saskatchewan (McKee)	1	0	1	0	2	0	0	0	2	0	6
Quebec (Hebert) 🔨	0	2	0	1	0	0	1	0	0	1	5

Sheet C	1	2	3	4	5	6	7	8	9	10	Final
Manitoba (Grassie)	1	0	2	0	2	0	2	0	0	X	7
Northern Ontario (Fisher) 🔨	0	3	0	3	0	1	0	2	1	X	10

Sheet D	1	2	3	4	5	6	7	8	9	10	Final
Newfoundland and Labrador (Mercer)	1	0	0	1	0	0	0	1	0	X	3
Nova Scotia (Dacey) 🔨	0	1	2	0	2	0	2	0	0	X	7

=== Draw 9 ===
Sheet A	1	2	3	4	5	6	7	8	9	10	Final
Quebec (Hebert) 🔨	0	0	1	0	2	0	0	1	0	X	4
New Brunswick (Jones)	0	2	0	2	0	0	3	0	1	X	8

Sheet B	1	2	3	4	5	6	7	8	9	10	Final
Ontario (Tuck) 🔨	2	0	1	0	0	3	1	1	X	X	8
Northwest Territories (Lennie)	0	1	0	1	1	0	0	0	X	X	3

Sheet C	1	2	3	4	5	6	7	8	9	10	11	Final
Nova Scotia (Dacey)	2	0	3	0	0	1	0	1	0	0	1	8
Alberta (Appelman) 🔨	0	2	0	1	0	0	2	0	1	1	0	7

Sheet D	1	2	3	4	5	6	7	8	9	10	Final
Northern Ontario (Fisher) 🔨	0	1	0	2	1	1	1	3	X	X	9
British Columbia (Monkman)	1	0	1	0	0	0	0	0	X	X	2

=== Draw 10 ===
Sheet A	1	2	3	4	5	6	7	8	9	10	Final
Northwest Territories (Lennie) 🔨	0	0	0	1	0	0	1	0	X	X	2
Saskatchewan (McKee)	2	1	3	0	2	1	0	7	X	X	16

Sheet B	1	2	3	4	5	6	7	8	9	10	Final
New Brunswick (Jones) 🔨	0	0	1	1	1	1	2	0	0	0	6
Prince Edward Island (Hope)	3	2	0	0	0	0	0	1	1	1	8

Sheet C	1	2	3	4	5	6	7	8	9	10	11	Final
British Columbia (Monkman) 🔨	0	2	0	0	0	1	0	1	0	3	0	7
Newfoundland and Labrador (Mercer)	1	0	0	1	2	0	1	0	2	0	1	8

Sheet D	1	2	3	4	5	6	7	8	9	10	Final
Alberta (Appelman) 🔨	0	0	1	0	1	0	0	1	0	X	3
Manitoba (Grassie)	3	0	0	1	0	1	1	0	2	X	8

=== Draw 11 ===
Sheet A	1	2	3	4	5	6	7	8	9	10	Final
Manitoba (Grassie)	1	1	2	0	2	0	3	X	X	X	9
Newfoundland and Labrador (Mercer) 🔨	0	0	0	2	0	1	0	X	X	X	3

Sheet B	1	2	3	4	5	6	7	8	9	10	Final
Northern Ontario (Fisher)	0	0	1	0	0	0	1	1	0	X	3
Nova Scotia (Dacey) 🔨	1	1	0	2	3	0	0	0	1	X	8

Sheet C	1	2	3	4	5	6	7	8	9	10	Final
Ontario (Tuck) 🔨	1	0	0	1	0	1	1	0	2	X	6
Quebec (Hebert)	0	0	1	0	1	0	0	1	0	X	3

Sheet D	1	2	3	4	5	6	7	8	9	10	Final
Northwest Territories (Lennie)	0	1	0	2	0	3	0	1	X	X	7
New Brunswick (Jones) 🔨	5	0	2	0	1	0	4	0	X	X	12

=== Draw 12 ===
Sheet A	1	2	3	4	5	6	7	8	9	10	Final
Nova Scotia (Dacey) 🔨	0	3	0	2	2	0	1	2	X	X	10
British Columbia (Monkman)	1	0	1	0	0	2	0	0	X	X	4

Sheet B	1	2	3	4	5	6	7	8	9	10	Final
Alberta (Appelman)	0	1	2	0	3	0	1	0	0	3	10
Newfoundland and Labrador (Mercer) 🔨	2	0	0	1	0	1	0	1	1	0	6

Sheet C	1	2	3	4	5	6	7	8	9	10	Final
New Brunswick (Jones) 🔨	2	0	0	2	1	0	1	1	2	X	9
Saskatchewan (McKee)	0	2	1	0	0	1	0	0	0	X	4

Sheet D	1	2	3	4	5	6	7	8	9	10	Final
Quebec (Hebert) 🔨	0	1	1	0	1	0	1	0	1	0	5
Prince Edward Island (Hope)	0	0	0	1	0	1	0	1	0	3	6

=== Draw 13 ===
Sheet A	1	2	3	4	5	6	7	8	9	10	Final
Alberta (Appelman)	0	2	0	0	0	2	0	3	1	3	11
Northern Ontario (Fisher) 🔨	1	0	2	0	3	0	1	0	0	0	7

Sheet B	1	2	3	4	5	6	7	8	9	10	Final
British Columbia (Monkman)	0	0	0	0	0	0	1	X	X	X	1
Manitoba (Grassie) 🔨	2	0	2	1	1	1	0	X	X	X	7

Sheet C	1	2	3	4	5	6	7	8	9	10	Final
Prince Edward Island (Hope) 🔨	3	0	0	2	0	1	0	3	X	X	9
Northwest Territories (Lennie)	0	0	1	0	1	0	2	0	X	X	4

Sheet D	1	2	3	4	5	6	7	8	9	10	Final
Saskatchewan (McKee) 🔨	2	0	1	0	4	1	0	X	X	X	8
Ontario (Tuck)	0	0	0	2	0	0	1	X	X	X	3

=== Draw 14 ===
Sheet A	1	2	3	4	5	6	7	8	9	10	Final
Ontario (Tuck) 🔨	1	0	2	3	0	0	1	0	0	0	7
Nova Scotia (Dacey)	0	1	0	0	0	1	0	1	1	2	6

Sheet B	1	2	3	4	5	6	7	8	9	10	Final
Northwest Territories (Lennie) 🔨	0	1	0	0	2	0	2	1	0	0	6
Alberta (Appelman)	1	0	3	2	0	2	0	0	0	0	8

Sheet C	1	2	3	4	5	6	7	8	9	10	Final
Newfoundland and Labrador (Mercer) 🔨	0	0	0	2	0	1	0	1	1	X	5
New Brunswick (Jones)	1	2	1	0	2	0	2	0	0	X	8

Sheet D	1	2	3	4	5	6	7	8	9	10	Final
British Columbia (Monkman) 🔨	0	0	0	1	0	1	0	1	0	1	4
Prince Edward Island (Hope)	0	0	1	0	0	0	0	0	1	0	2

=== Draw 15 ===
Sheet A	1	2	3	4	5	6	7	8	9	10	Final
New Brunswick (Jones) 🔨	2	0	1	0	0	0	1	0	0	X	4
British Columbia (Monkman)	0	1	0	1	1	1	0	1	4	X	9

Sheet B	1	2	3	4	5	6	7	8	9	10	Final
Prince Edward Island (Hope) 🔨	0	3	0	2	0	1	1	0	0	1	8
Newfoundland and Labrador (Mercer)	1	0	2	0	1	0	0	0	2	0	6

Sheet C	1	2	3	4	5	6	7	8	9	10	Final
Northern Ontario (Fisher) 🔨	0	1	1	0	2	0	2	0	2	0	8
Saskatchewan (McKee)	2	0	0	2	0	3	0	2	0	1	10

Sheet D	1	2	3	4	5	6	7	8	9	10	Final
Manitoba (Grassie) 🔨	0	2	0	0	0	0	0	1	1	0	4
Quebec (Hebert)	0	0	0	0	0	1	0	0	0	2	3

=== Draw 16 ===
Sheet A	1	2	3	4	5	6	7	8	9	10	Final
Saskatchewan (McKee)	1	0	2	1	0	2	0	0	0	X	6
Manitoba (Grassie) 🔨	0	2	0	0	3	0	0	4	0	X	9

Sheet B	1	2	3	4	5	6	7	8	9	10	Final
Quebec (Hebert) 🔨	2	1	0	0	0	3	0	0	3	X	9
Northern Ontario (Fisher)	0	0	1	1	1	0	1	1	0	X	5

Sheet C	1	2	3	4	5	6	7	8	9	10	Final
Alberta (Appelman)	0	0	1	0	0	1	X	X	X	X	2
Ontario (Tuck) 🔨	3	1	0	0	4	0	X	X	X	X	8

Sheet D	1	2	3	4	5	6	7	8	9	10	Final
Nova Scotia (Dacey) 🔨	3	2	4	0	2	0	X	X	X	X	11
Northwest Territories (Lennie)	0	0	0	2	0	1	X	X	X	X	3

=== Draw 17 ===
Sheet A	1	2	3	4	5	6	7	8	9	10	Final
Northwest Territories (Lennie)	0	0	4	0	0	0	0	X	X	X	4
Newfoundland and Labrador (Mercer) 🔨	1	2	0	3	1	3	1	X	X	X	11

Sheet B	1	2	3	4	5	6	7	8	9	10	Final
New Brunswick (Jones) 🔨	0	0	0	1	1	0	1	0	0	X	3
Nova Scotia (Dacey)	2	0	0	0	0	1	0	3	0	X	6

Sheet C	1	2	3	4	5	6	7	8	9	10	Final
Quebec (Hebert) 🔨	1	0	0	1	0	1	2	0	0	2	7
Alberta (Appelman)	0	0	0	0	2	0	0	2	2	0	6

Sheet D	1	2	3	4	5	6	7	8	9	10	Final
Prince Edward Island (Hope) 🔨	0	2	1	0	0	0	1	1	0	X	5
Manitoba (Grassie)	2	0	0	2	2	0	0	0	4	X	10

== Tiebreaker ==
Sheet D	1	2	3	4	5	6	7	8	9	10	Final
Ontario (Tuck) 🔨	1	0	2	0	1	0	4	0	X	X	8
Nova Scotia (Dacey)	0	2	0	1	0	1	0	0	X	X	4

== Playoffs ==
Semifinal			Final
			1	Manitoba	6
2	Saskatchewan	5	3	Ontario	4
3	Ontario	6

=== Semifinal ===
Sheet C	1	2	3	4	5	6	7	8	9	10	Final
Saskatchewan (McKee) 🔨	1	0	1	0	2	0	1	0	0	0	5
Ontario (Tuck)	0	2	0	2	0	1	0	0	0	1	6

=== Final ===
Sheet C	1	2	3	4	5	6	7	8	9	10	Final
Manitoba (Grassie) 🔨	2	0	1	0	0	1	1	1	0	X	6
Ontario (Tuck)	0	2	0	1	1	0	0	0	0	X	4
