= 2018 Canadian Mixed Doubles Curling Olympic Trials =

2018 Canadian Mixed Doubles Olympic Curling Trials
- Host city: Portage la Prairie, Manitoba
- Arena: Stride Place
- Dates: January 2–7
- Winner: (Manitoba) (Alberta) Lawes / Morris
- Female: Kaitlyn Lawes
- Male: John Morris
- Finalist: (Alberta) (Newfoundland and Labrador) Sweeting / Gushue

The 2018 Canadian Mixed Doubles Curling Olympic Trials, also known as the Canad Inns Canadian Mixed Doubles Trials, were held from January 2 to 7 at the Stride Place in Portage la Prairie, Manitoba. The winners of this event represented Canada at the 2018 Winter Olympics.

== Teams ==
Teams qualified for these Olympic Trials by virtue of their results at the past two Canadian Mixed Doubles Curling Championships as well as their standing on the Canadian Mixed Doubles Rankings (CMDR). Members of Canada's Olympic four-player teams are not eligible to compete in the Canadian Mixed Doubles Trials because of the rigours of the Olympic curling schedule. If their teammate qualified for the Olympics as part of a four-player team, they must name a replacement to compete alongside them in the Trials.

The teams that qualified for the trials are listed as follows:

| Province / Territory | Male | Female |
|---|---|---|
| Alberta; Manitoba | John Morris | ~~Rachel Homan~~; Kaitlyn Lawes |
| Manitoba | Reid Carruthers | ~~Joanne Courtney~~; Jill Officer |
| Newfoundland and Labrador; Ontario | ~~Brent Laing~~; Mark Nichols | Jennifer Jones |
| Newfoundland and Labrador; Alberta | Brett Gallant | Jocelyn Peterman |
| Manitoba; Alberta | Colin Hodgson | Chelsea Carey |
| Alberta | Charley Thomas | Kalynn Park |
| Manitoba | Mike McEwen | Dawn McEwen |
| British Columbia; Saskatchewan | Tyrel Griffith | ~~Emma Miskew~~; Sherry Just |
| Ontario | John Epping | ~~Lisa Weagle~~; Sherry Middaugh |
| Newfoundland and Labrador; Alberta | Geoff Walker | Laura Crocker |
| Saskatchewan | Catlin Schneider | Nancy Martin |
| Saskatchewan | Dustin Kalthoff | Marliese Kasner |
| Newfoundland and Labrador; Alberta | Brad Gushue | Val Sweeting |
| Ontario | Wayne Tuck Jr. | Kim Tuck |
| Quebec | Robert Desjardins | Émilie Desjardins |
| Ontario | Tyler Stewart | Nicole Westlund-Stewart |
| Alberta | Brendan Bottcher | Dana Ferguson |
| Manitoba | Jason Gunnlaugson | Shannon Birchard |

== Round-robin standings ==
Final round-robin standings

Key
| Teams to Round of 8 |
| Teams to Tiebreaker |

| Pool A | W | L |
|---|---|---|
| (Alberta) (Newfoundland and Labrador) Peterman / Gallant | 8 | 0 |
| (Manitoba) (Newfoundland and Labrador) Jones / Nichols | 6 | 2 |
| (Manitoba) Officer / Carruthers | 5 | 3 |
| (Saskatchewan) Martin / Schneider | 5 | 3 |
| (Quebec) É. Desjardins / R. Desjardins | 4 | 4 |
| (Saskatchewan) (British Columbia) Just / Griffith | 3 | 5 |
| (Manitoba) D. McEwen / M. McEwen | 2 | 6 |
| (Manitoba) Birchard / Gunnlaugson | 2 | 6 |
| (Ontario) K. Tuck / W. Tuck | 1 | 7 |

| Pool B | W | L |
|---|---|---|
| (Alberta) (Newfoundland and Labrador) Crocker / Walker | 8 | 0 |
| (Alberta) Ferguson / Bottcher | 6 | 2 |
| (Manitoba) (Alberta) Lawes / Morris | 5 | 3 |
| (Alberta) (Newfoundland and Labrador) Sweeting / Gushue | 5 | 3 |
| (Alberta) (Manitoba) Carey / Hodgson | 5 | 3 |
| (Alberta) Park / Thomas | 3 | 5 |
| (Ontario) Middaugh / Epping | 3 | 5 |
| (Saskatchewan) Kasner / Kalthoff | 1 | 7 |
| (Ontario) Westlund-Stewart / Stewart | 0 | 8 |

== Round-robin results ==
All draw times are listed in Central Time (UTC−6:00).

=== Draw 1 ===
Tuesday, January 2, 8:00

| Team | 1 | 2 | 3 | 4 | 5 | 6 | 7 | 8 | Final |
| (Manitoba) D. McEwen / M. McEwen | 0 | 0 | 1 | 0 | 0 | 1 | 1 | X | 3 |
| (Quebec) É. Desjardins / R. Desjardins | 2 | 1 | 0 | 1 | 1 | 0 | 0 | X | 5 |

| Team | 1 | 2 | 3 | 4 | 5 | 6 | 7 | 8 | Final |
| (Saskatchewan) Martin / Schneider | 0 | 5 | 2 | 1 | 2 | 0 | 1 | X | 11 |
| (Saskatchewan) (British Columbia) Just / Griffith | 2 | 0 | 0 | 0 | 0 | 3 | 0 | X | 5 |

| Team | 1 | 2 | 3 | 4 | 5 | 6 | 7 | 8 | Final |
| (Manitoba) Birchard / Gunnlaugson | 0 | 0 | 1 | 0 | 1 | 1 | 0 | X | 3 |
| (Ontario) (Newfoundland and Labrador) Jones / Nichols | 3 | 2 | 0 | 2 | 0 | 0 | 2 | X | 9 |

| Team | 1 | 2 | 3 | 4 | 5 | 6 | 7 | 8 | Final |
| (Alberta) (Newfoundland and Labrador) Peterman / Gallant | 5 | 1 | 0 | 0 | 3 | 0 | 2 | X | 11 |
| (Ontario) K. Tuck / W. Tuck | 0 | 0 | 1 | 2 | 0 | 1 | 0 | X | 4 |

=== Draw 2 ===
Tuesday, January 2, 10:45

| Team | 1 | 2 | 3 | 4 | 5 | 6 | 7 | 8 | Final |
| (Alberta) Park / Thomas | 2 | 0 | 2 | 0 | 2 | 0 | 1 | X | 7 |
| (Ontario) Westlund-Stewart / Stewart | 0 | 1 | 0 | 1 | 0 | 2 | 0 | X | 4 |

| Team | 1 | 2 | 3 | 4 | 5 | 6 | 7 | 8 | Final |
| (Alberta) (Newfoundland and Labrador) Crocker / Walker | 0 | 1 | 1 | 2 | 2 | 0 | 1 | 0 | 7 |
| (Ontario) Middaugh / Epping | 1 | 0 | 0 | 0 | 0 | 2 | 0 | 1 | 4 |

| Team | 1 | 2 | 3 | 4 | 5 | 6 | 7 | 8 | Final |
| (Alberta) Ferguson / Bottcher | 0 | 0 | 2 | 0 | 2 | 1 | 1 | 2 | 8 |
| (Manitoba) (Alberta) Lawes / Morris | 2 | 1 | 0 | 1 | 0 | 0 | 0 | 0 | 4 |

| Team | 1 | 2 | 3 | 4 | 5 | 6 | 7 | 8 | Final |
| (Alberta) (Manitoba) Carey / Hodgson | 1 | 0 | 3 | 0 | 1 | 0 | 1 | X | 6 |
| (Alberta) (Newfoundland and Labrador) Sweeting / Gushue | 0 | 1 | 0 | 2 | 0 | 1 | 0 | X | 4 |

=== Draw 3 ===
Tuesday, January 2, 13:30

| Team | 1 | 2 | 3 | 4 | 5 | 6 | 7 | 8 | Final |
| (Ontario) (Newfoundland and Labrador) Jones / Nichols | 0 | 0 | 2 | 0 | 0 | 1 | 0 | X | 3 |
| (Manitoba) Officer / Carruthers | 1 | 1 | 0 | 2 | 1 | 0 | 1 | X | 6 |

| Team | 1 | 2 | 3 | 4 | 5 | 6 | 7 | 8 | Final |
| (Ontario) K. Tuck / W. Tuck | 0 | 0 | 1 | 0 | 4 | 0 | 1 | 0 | 6 |
| (Manitoba) Birchard / Gunnlaugson | 1 | 2 | 0 | 3 | 0 | 1 | 0 | 3 | 10 |

| Team | 1 | 2 | 3 | 4 | 5 | 6 | 7 | 8 | Final |
| (Saskatchewan) (British Columbia) Just / Griffith | 0 | 2 | 0 | 0 | 1 | 0 | 3 | 0 | 6 |
| (Quebec) É. Desjardins / R. Desjardins | 2 | 0 | 1 | 1 | 0 | 2 | 0 | 2 | 8 |

| Team | 1 | 2 | 3 | 4 | 5 | 6 | 7 | 8 | 9 | Final |
| (Manitoba) D. McEwen / M. McEwen | 0 | 2 | 0 | 1 | 0 | 2 | 0 | 1 | 0 | 6 |
| (Saskatchewan) Martin / Schneider | 2 | 0 | 1 | 0 | 2 | 0 | 1 | 0 | 1 | 7 |

=== Draw 4 ===
Tuesday, January 2, 16:15

| Team | 1 | 2 | 3 | 4 | 5 | 6 | 7 | 8 | Final |
| (Manitoba) (Alberta) Lawes / Morris | 1 | 1 | 1 | 0 | 0 | 2 | 0 | 1 | 6 |
| (Saskatchewan) Kasner / Kalthoff | 0 | 0 | 0 | 1 | 2 | 0 | 2 | 0 | 5 |

| Team | 1 | 2 | 3 | 4 | 5 | 6 | 7 | 8 | Final |
| (Alberta) (Newfoundland and Labrador) Sweeting / Gushue | 2 | 0 | 0 | 2 | 0 | 0 | 2 | 0 | 6 |
| (Alberta) Ferguson / Bottcher | 0 | 1 | 1 | 0 | 2 | 1 | 0 | 2 | 7 |

| Team | 1 | 2 | 3 | 4 | 5 | 6 | 7 | 8 | Final |
| (Ontario) Middaugh / Epping | 0 | 0 | 1 | 0 | 1 | 1 | 0 | 3 | 6 |
| (Ontario) Westlund-Stewart / Stewart | 1 | 1 | 0 | 2 | 0 | 0 | 1 | 0 | 5 |

| Team | 1 | 2 | 3 | 4 | 5 | 6 | 7 | 8 | Final |
| (Alberta) Park / Thomas | 0 | 0 | 2 | 0 | 1 | 0 | X | X | 3 |
| (Alberta) (Newfoundland and Labrador) Crocker / Walker | 1 | 2 | 0 | 1 | 0 | 5 | X | X | 9 |

=== Draw 5 ===
Tuesday, January 2, 19:00

| Team | 1 | 2 | 3 | 4 | 5 | 6 | 7 | 8 | Final |
| (Manitoba) Birchard / Gunnlaugson | 1 | 0 | 0 | 1 | 0 | 1 | 1 | 0 | 4 |
| (Manitoba) D. McEwen / M. McEwen | 0 | 2 | 1 | 0 | 1 | 0 | 0 | 1 | 5 |

| Team | 1 | 2 | 3 | 4 | 5 | 6 | 7 | 8 | Final |
| (Quebec) É. Desjardins / R. Desjardins | 1 | 0 | 2 | 0 | 1 | 0 | 2 | 0 | 6 |
| (Alberta) (Newfoundland and Labrador) Peterman / Gallant | 0 | 2 | 0 | 2 | 0 | 1 | 0 | 2 | 7 |

| Team | 1 | 2 | 3 | 4 | 5 | 6 | 7 | 8 | Final |
| (Manitoba) Officer / Carruthers | 0 | 2 | 1 | 1 | 0 | 4 | 2 | X | 10 |
| (Saskatchewan) Martin / Schneider | 1 | 0 | 0 | 0 | 2 | 0 | 0 | X | 3 |

| Team | 1 | 2 | 3 | 4 | 5 | 6 | 7 | 8 | Final |
| (Ontario) (Newfoundland and Labrador) Jones / Nichols | 1 | 1 | 0 | 5 | 0 | 5 | X | X | 12 |
| (Saskatchewan) (British Columbia) Just / Griffith | 0 | 0 | 2 | 0 | 1 | 0 | X | X | 3 |

=== Draw 6 ===
Tuesday, January 2, 21:45

| Team | 1 | 2 | 3 | 4 | 5 | 6 | 7 | 8 | Final |
| (Alberta) Ferguson / Bottcher | 2 | 0 | 1 | 0 | 1 | 0 | 2 | X | 6 |
| (Alberta) Park / Thomas | 0 | 1 | 0 | 1 | 0 | 2 | 0 | X | 4 |

| Team | 1 | 2 | 3 | 4 | 5 | 6 | 7 | 8 | Final |
| (Ontario) Westlund-Stewart / Stewart | 1 | 0 | 0 | 1 | 0 | 1 | 0 | X | 3 |
| (Alberta) (Manitoba) Carey / Hodgson | 0 | 2 | 2 | 0 | 2 | 0 | 1 | X | 7 |

| Team | 1 | 2 | 3 | 4 | 5 | 6 | 7 | 8 | Final |
| (Saskatchewan) Kasner / Kalthoff | 0 | 0 | 1 | 0 | 1 | 1 | 0 | X | 3 |
| (Alberta) (Newfoundland and Labrador) Crocker / Walker | 2 | 2 | 0 | 1 | 0 | 0 | 4 | X | 9 |

| Team | 1 | 2 | 3 | 4 | 5 | 6 | 7 | 8 | Final |
| (Manitoba) (Alberta) Lawes / Morris | 3 | 1 | 2 | 0 | 3 | 2 | X | X | 11 |
| (Ontario) Middaugh / Epping | 0 | 0 | 0 | 2 | 0 | 0 | X | X | 2 |

=== Draw 7 ===
Wednesday, January 3, 8:00

| Team | 1 | 2 | 3 | 4 | 5 | 6 | 7 | 8 | Final |
| (Saskatchewan) Martin / Schneider | 0 | 0 | 0 | 2 | 0 | 2 | 0 | 3 | 7 |
| (Quebec) É. Desjardins / R. Desjardins | 2 | 1 | 1 | 0 | 1 | 0 | 1 | 0 | 6 |

| Team | 1 | 2 | 3 | 4 | 5 | 6 | 7 | 8 | Final |
| (Saskatchewan) (British Columbia) Just / Griffith | 0 | 0 | 2 | 2 | 1 | 0 | 2 | X | 7 |
| (Ontario) K. Tuck / W. Tuck | 1 | 2 | 0 | 0 | 0 | 1 | 0 | X | 4 |

| Team | 1 | 2 | 3 | 4 | 5 | 6 | 7 | 8 | Final |
| (Alberta) (Newfoundland and Labrador) Peterman / Gallant | 1 | 1 | 0 | 2 | 0 | 1 | 0 | 2 | 7 |
| (Manitoba) Birchard / Gunnlaugson | 0 | 0 | 2 | 0 | 1 | 0 | 3 | 0 | 6 |

| Team | 1 | 2 | 3 | 4 | 5 | 6 | 7 | 8 | Final |
| (Manitoba) D. McEwen / M. McEwen | 0 | 2 | 0 | 1 | 3 | 1 | 0 | 1 | 8 |
| (Manitoba) Officer / Carruthers | 1 | 0 | 5 | 0 | 0 | 0 | 1 | 0 | 7 |

=== Draw 8 ===
Wednesday, January 3, 10:45

| Team | 1 | 2 | 3 | 4 | 5 | 6 | 7 | 8 | Final |
| (Alberta) (Newfoundland and Labrador) Crocker / Walker | 0 | 3 | 0 | 3 | 0 | 4 | X | X | 10 |
| (Ontario) Westlund-Stewart / Stewart | 1 | 0 | 2 | 0 | 1 | 0 | X | X | 4 |

| Team | 1 | 2 | 3 | 4 | 5 | 6 | 7 | 8 | Final |
| (Ontario) Middaugh / Epping | 0 | 1 | 0 | 2 | 0 | 3 | 2 | 0 | 8 |
| (Alberta) (Newfoundland and Labrador) Sweeting / Gushue | 2 | 0 | 2 | 0 | 2 | 0 | 0 | 4 | 10 |

| Team | 1 | 2 | 3 | 4 | 5 | 6 | 7 | 8 | Final |
| (Alberta) (Manitoba) Carey / Hodgson | 2 | 0 | 0 | 1 | 0 | 1 | 0 | 1 | 5 |
| (Alberta) Ferguson / Bottcher | 0 | 1 | 1 | 0 | 1 | 0 | 3 | 0 | 6 |

| Team | 1 | 2 | 3 | 4 | 5 | 6 | 7 | 8 | Final |
| (Alberta) Park / Thomas | 1 | 0 | 1 | 0 | 2 | 0 | 2 | X | 6 |
| (Saskatchewan) Kasner / Kalthoff | 0 | 1 | 0 | 1 | 0 | 1 | 0 | X | 3 |

=== Draw 9 ===
Wednesday, January 3, 13:30

| Team | 1 | 2 | 3 | 4 | 5 | 6 | 7 | 8 | Final |
| (Ontario) K. Tuck / W. Tuck | 0 | 2 | 0 | 1 | 0 | 2 | 0 | 0 | 5 |
| (Ontario) (Newfoundland and Labrador) Jones / Nichols | 1 | 0 | 2 | 0 | 2 | 0 | 2 | 1 | 8 |

| Team | 1 | 2 | 3 | 4 | 5 | 6 | 7 | 8 | Final |
| (Manitoba) Officer / Carruthers | 0 | 2 | 0 | 3 | 0 | 2 | 0 | X | 7 |
| (Manitoba) Birchard / Gunnlaugson | 1 | 0 | 1 | 0 | 2 | 0 | 1 | X | 5 |

| Team | 1 | 2 | 3 | 4 | 5 | 6 | 7 | 8 | Final |
| (Manitoba) D. McEwen / M. McEwen | 1 | 0 | 1 | 0 | 0 | 3 | 0 | X | 5 |
| (Saskatchewan) (British Columbia) Just / Griffith | 0 | 2 | 0 | 1 | 3 | 0 | 3 | X | 9 |

| Team | 1 | 2 | 3 | 4 | 5 | 6 | 7 | 8 | Final |
| (Saskatchewan) Martin / Schneider | 0 | 0 | 1 | 1 | 0 | 0 | X | X | 2 |
| (Alberta) (Newfoundland and Labrador) Peterman / Gallant | 3 | 1 | 0 | 0 | 3 | 3 | X | X | 10 |

=== Draw 10 ===
Wednesday, January 3, 16:15

| Team | 1 | 2 | 3 | 4 | 5 | 6 | 7 | 8 | Final |
| (Alberta) (Newfoundland and Labrador) Sweeting / Gushue | 0 | 1 | 0 | 1 | 1 | 1 | 0 | 2 | 6 |
| (Manitoba) (Alberta) Lawes / Morris | 1 | 0 | 1 | 0 | 0 | 0 | 1 | 0 | 3 |

| Team | 1 | 2 | 3 | 4 | 5 | 6 | 7 | 8 | Final |
| (Saskatchewan) Kasner / Kalthoff | 0 | 1 | 0 | 0 | 0 | 0 | X | X | 1 |
| (Alberta) Ferguson / Bottcher | 1 | 0 | 3 | 1 | 1 | 2 | X | X | 8 |

| Team | 1 | 2 | 3 | 4 | 5 | 6 | 7 | 8 | Final |
| (Alberta) Park / Thomas | 0 | 3 | 1 | 0 | 3 | 1 | 0 | 0 | 8 |
| (Ontario) Middaugh / Epping | 2 | 0 | 0 | 2 | 0 | 0 | 2 | 1 | 7 |

| Team | 1 | 2 | 3 | 4 | 5 | 6 | 7 | 8 | Final |
| (Alberta) (Newfoundland and Labrador) Crocker / Walker | 4 | 0 | 1 | 0 | 0 | 1 | 0 | 3 | 9 |
| (Alberta) (Manitoba) Carey / Hodgson | 0 | 1 | 0 | 1 | 1 | 0 | 2 | 0 | 5 |

=== Draw 11 ===
Wednesday, January 3, 19:00

| Team | 1 | 2 | 3 | 4 | 5 | 6 | 7 | 8 | Final |
| (Alberta) (Newfoundland and Labrador) Peterman / Gallant | 2 | 1 | 0 | 5 | 2 | 0 | 2 | X | 12 |
| (Manitoba) D. McEwen / M. McEwen | 0 | 0 | 2 | 0 | 0 | 1 | 0 | X | 3 |

| Team | 1 | 2 | 3 | 4 | 5 | 6 | 7 | 8 | 9 | Final |
| (Saskatchewan) Martin / Schneider | 0 | 0 | 0 | 1 | 1 | 0 | 1 | 1 | 0 | 4 |
| (Ontario) (Newfoundland and Labrador) Jones / Nichols | 1 | 1 | 1 | 0 | 0 | 1 | 0 | 0 | 1 | 5 |

| Team | 1 | 2 | 3 | 4 | 5 | 6 | 7 | 8 | Final |
| (Manitoba) Officer / Carruthers | 5 | 4 | 0 | 3 | 0 | 3 | X | X | 15 |
| (Ontario) K. Tuck / W. Tuck | 0 | 0 | 1 | 0 | 1 | 0 | X | X | 2 |

| Team | 1 | 2 | 3 | 4 | 5 | 6 | 7 | 8 | Final |
| (Manitoba) Birchard / Gunnlaugson | 2 | 0 | 2 | 0 | 0 | 0 | 0 | 1 | 5 |
| (Quebec) É. Desjardins / R. Desjardins | 0 | 2 | 0 | 1 | 1 | 1 | 1 | 0 | 6 |

=== Draw 12 ===
Wednesday, January 3, 21:45

| Team | 1 | 2 | 3 | 4 | 5 | 6 | 7 | 8 | Final |
| (Alberta) (Manitoba) Carey / Hodgson | 2 | 1 | 1 | 2 | 0 | 1 | X | X | 7 |
| (Alberta) Park / Thomas | 0 | 0 | 0 | 0 | 1 | 0 | X | X | 1 |

| Team | 1 | 2 | 3 | 4 | 5 | 6 | 7 | 8 | Final |
| (Alberta) (Newfoundland and Labrador) Crocker / Walker | 3 | 0 | 3 | 0 | 1 | 0 | 0 | 4 | 11 |
| (Manitoba) (Alberta) Lawes / Morris | 0 | 4 | 0 | 1 | 0 | 3 | 2 | 0 | 10 |

| Team | 1 | 2 | 3 | 4 | 5 | 6 | 7 | 8 | 9 | Final |
| (Saskatchewan) Kasner / Kalthoff | 1 | 0 | 1 | 0 | 0 | 0 | 1 | 1 | 0 | 4 |
| (Alberta) (Newfoundland and Labrador) Sweeting / Gushue | 0 | 1 | 0 | 1 | 1 | 1 | 0 | 0 | 1 | 5 |

| Team | 1 | 2 | 3 | 4 | 5 | 6 | 7 | 8 | Final |
| (Alberta) Ferguson / Bottcher | 3 | 1 | 1 | 0 | 0 | 0 | 1 | X | 6 |
| (Ontario) Westlund-Stewart / Stewart | 0 | 0 | 0 | 1 | 1 | 1 | 0 | X | 3 |

=== Draw 13 ===
Thursday, January 4, 8:00

| Team | 1 | 2 | 3 | 4 | 5 | 6 | 7 | 8 | Final |
| (Manitoba) Birchard / Gunnlaugson | 1 | 0 | 0 | 1 | 0 | 1 | 0 | 1 | 4 |
| (Saskatchewan) Martin / Schneider | 0 | 3 | 1 | 0 | 1 | 0 | 0 | 0 | 5 |

| Team | 1 | 2 | 3 | 4 | 5 | 6 | 7 | 8 | Final |
| (Ontario) K. Tuck / W. Tuck | 2 | 0 | 0 | 0 | 0 | 3 | 0 | 1 | 6 |
| (Quebec) É. Desjardins / R. Desjardins | 0 | 2 | 2 | 1 | 1 | 0 | 2 | 0 | 8 |

| Team | 1 | 2 | 3 | 4 | 5 | 6 | 7 | 8 | Final |
| (Ontario) (Newfoundland and Labrador) Jones / Nichols | 1 | 0 | 1 | 0 | 0 | 4 | 0 | 0 | 6 |
| (Alberta) (Newfoundland and Labrador) Peterman / Gallant | 0 | 2 | 0 | 3 | 1 | 0 | 2 | 1 | 9 |

| Team | 1 | 2 | 3 | 4 | 5 | 6 | 7 | 8 | Final |
| (Saskatchewan) (British Columbia) Just / Griffith | 1 | 0 | 4 | 1 | 1 | 0 | 1 | 0 | 8 |
| (Manitoba) Officer / Carruthers | 0 | 3 | 0 | 0 | 0 | 3 | 0 | 1 | 7 |

=== Draw 14 ===
Thursday, January 4, 10:45

| Team | 1 | 2 | 3 | 4 | 5 | 6 | 7 | 8 | Final |
| (Alberta) Ferguson / Bottcher | 0 | 1 | 0 | 3 | 0 | 2 | 0 | 0 | 6 |
| (Alberta) (Newfoundland and Labrador) Crocker / Walker | 3 | 0 | 2 | 0 | 1 | 0 | 1 | 2 | 9 |

| Team | 1 | 2 | 3 | 4 | 5 | 6 | 7 | 8 | Final |
| (Alberta) (Newfoundland and Labrador) Sweeting / Gushue | 4 | 0 | 1 | 0 | 4 | 0 | 0 | X | 9 |
| (Ontario) Westlund-Stewart / Stewart | 0 | 1 | 0 | 1 | 0 | 3 | 1 | X | 6 |

| Team | 1 | 2 | 3 | 4 | 5 | 6 | 7 | 8 | 9 | Final |
| (Manitoba) (Alberta) Lawes / Morris | 0 | 2 | 0 | 3 | 1 | 0 | 0 | 1 | 1 | 8 |
| (Alberta) (Manitoba) Carey / Hodgson | 3 | 0 | 1 | 0 | 0 | 2 | 1 | 0 | 0 | 7 |

| Team | 1 | 2 | 3 | 4 | 5 | 6 | 7 | 8 | Final |
| (Ontario) Middaugh / Epping | 2 | 0 | 1 | 0 | 2 | 0 | 3 | X | 8 |
| (Saskatchewan) Kasner / Kalthoff | 0 | 1 | 0 | 1 | 0 | 1 | 0 | X | 3 |

=== Draw 15 ===
Thursday, January 4, 13:30

| Team | 1 | 2 | 3 | 4 | 5 | 6 | 7 | 8 | Final |
| (Alberta) (Newfoundland and Labrador) Peterman / Gallant | 1 | 0 | 2 | 3 | 1 | 0 | X | X | 7 |
| (Saskatchewan) (British Columbia) Just / Griffith | 0 | 1 | 0 | 0 | 0 | 1 | X | X | 2 |

| Team | 1 | 2 | 3 | 4 | 5 | 6 | 7 | 8 | Final |
| (Manitoba) D. McEwen / M. McEwen | 0 | 3 | 2 | 0 | 1 | 0 | 0 | 0 | 6 |
| (Ontario) (Newfoundland and Labrador) Jones / Nichols | 1 | 0 | 0 | 3 | 0 | 2 | 1 | 2 | 9 |

| Team | 1 | 2 | 3 | 4 | 5 | 6 | 7 | 8 | Final |
| (Quebec) É. Desjardins / R. Desjardins | 0 | 1 | 0 | 0 | 1 | 0 | X | X | 2 |
| (Manitoba) Officer / Carruthers | 2 | 0 | 3 | 1 | 0 | 4 | X | X | 10 |

| Team | 1 | 2 | 3 | 4 | 5 | 6 | 7 | 8 | Final |
| (Saskatchewan) Martin / Schneider | 1 | 0 | 0 | 1 | 1 | 0 | 3 | 1 | 7 |
| (Ontario) K. Tuck / W. Tuck | 0 | 1 | 1 | 0 | 0 | 4 | 0 | 0 | 6 |

=== Draw 16 ===
Thursday, January 4, 16:15

| Team | 1 | 2 | 3 | 4 | 5 | 6 | 7 | 8 | Final |
| (Alberta) (Manitoba) Carey / Hodgson | 1 | 2 | 2 | 0 | 3 | 0 | X | X | 8 |
| (Ontario) Middaugh / Epping | 0 | 0 | 0 | 1 | 0 | 2 | X | X | 3 |

| Team | 1 | 2 | 3 | 4 | 5 | 6 | 7 | 8 | Final |
| (Alberta) Park / Thomas | 0 | 1 | 0 | 2 | 0 | 0 | 0 | 1 | 4 |
| (Manitoba) (Alberta) Lawes / Morris | 1 | 0 | 1 | 0 | 1 | 1 | 1 | 0 | 5 |

| Team | 1 | 2 | 3 | 4 | 5 | 6 | 7 | 8 | Final |
| (Ontario) Westlund-Stewart / Stewart | 0 | 2 | 0 | 1 | 0 | 1 | 0 | X | 4 |
| (Saskatchewan) Kasner / Kalthoff | 2 | 0 | 2 | 0 | 5 | 0 | 1 | X | 10 |

| Team | 1 | 2 | 3 | 4 | 5 | 6 | 7 | 8 | 9 | Final |
| (Alberta) (Newfoundland and Labrador) Sweeting / Gushue | 2 | 4 | 0 | 0 | 0 | 0 | 2 | 0 | 0 | 8 |
| (Alberta) (Newfoundland and Labrador) Crocker / Walker | 0 | 0 | 1 | 2 | 1 | 1 | 0 | 3 | 1 | 9 |

=== Draw 17 ===
Thursday, January 4, 19:00

| Team | 1 | 2 | 3 | 4 | 5 | 6 | 7 | 8 | Final |
| (Saskatchewan) (British Columbia) Just / Griffith | 3 | 0 | 1 | 0 | 0 | 1 | 0 | X | 5 |
| (Manitoba) Birchard / Gunnlaugson | 0 | 2 | 0 | 1 | 1 | 0 | 3 | X | 7 |

| Team | 1 | 2 | 3 | 4 | 5 | 6 | 7 | 8 | Final |
| (Manitoba) Officer / Carruthers | 0 | 1 | 0 | 0 | 0 | 1 | 0 | X | 2 |
| (Alberta) (Newfoundland and Labrador) Peterman / Gallant | 2 | 0 | 1 | 2 | 2 | 0 | 1 | X | 8 |

| Team | 1 | 2 | 3 | 4 | 5 | 6 | 7 | 8 | Final |
| (Ontario) K. Tuck / W. Tuck | 1 | 0 | 3 | 0 | 2 | 1 | 0 | X | 7 |
| (Manitoba) D. McEwen / M. McEwen | 0 | 2 | 0 | 2 | 0 | 0 | 1 | X | 5 |

| Team | 1 | 2 | 3 | 4 | 5 | 6 | 7 | 8 | Final |
| (Ontario) (Newfoundland and Labrador) Jones / Nichols | 0 | 3 | 0 | 3 | 0 | 2 | 0 | X | 8 |
| (Quebec) É. Desjardins / R. Desjardins | 1 | 0 | 1 | 0 | 1 | 0 | 1 | X | 4 |

=== Draw 18 ===
Thursday, January 4, 21:45

| Team | 1 | 2 | 3 | 4 | 5 | 6 | 7 | 8 | Final |
| (Ontario) Middaugh / Epping | 1 | 0 | 1 | 1 | 0 | 1 | 0 | 1 | 5 |
| (Alberta) Ferguson / Bottcher | 0 | 1 | 0 | 0 | 2 | 0 | 1 | 0 | 4 |

| Team | 1 | 2 | 3 | 4 | 5 | 6 | 7 | 8 | Final |
| (Saskatchewan) Kasner / Kalthoff | 0 | 1 | 0 | 1 | 0 | 1 | 0 | X | 3 |
| (Alberta) (Manitoba) Carey / Hodgson | 2 | 0 | 1 | 0 | 4 | 0 | 3 | X | 10 |

| Team | 1 | 2 | 3 | 4 | 5 | 6 | 7 | 8 | Final |
| (Alberta) (Newfoundland and Labrador) Sweeting / Gushue | 0 | 0 | 3 | 2 | 0 | 2 | 3 | X | 10 |
| (Alberta) Park / Thomas | 1 | 2 | 0 | 0 | 2 | 0 | 0 | X | 5 |

| Team | 1 | 2 | 3 | 4 | 5 | 6 | 7 | 8 | Final |
| (Manitoba) (Alberta) Lawes / Morris | 4 | 0 | 2 | 0 | 2 | 3 | X | X | 11 |
| (Ontario) Westlund-Stewart / Stewart | 0 | 2 | 0 | 1 | 0 | 0 | X | X | 3 |

== Tiebreaker ==
Friday, January 5, 08:30

| Team | 1 | 2 | 3 | 4 | 5 | 6 | 7 | 8 | 9 | Final |
| (Alberta) (Manitoba) Carey / Hodgson | 0 | 3 | 0 | 3 | 1 | 0 | 0 | 0 | 2 | 9 |
| (Saskatchewan) Martin / Schneider | 2 | 0 | 2 | 0 | 0 | 1 | 1 | 1 | 0 | 7 |

== Round of 8 ==
=== A Bracket ===
Qualifier 1
1 | (Alberta) (Newfoundland and Labrador) Peterman / Gallant | 6
8 | (Alberta) (Manitoba) Carey / Hodgson | 4
1 | (Alberta) (Newfoundland and Labrador) Peterman / Gallant | 5
5 | (Manitoba) (Alberta) Lawes / Morris | 7
4 | (Alberta) Ferguson / Bottcher | 6
5 | (Manitoba) (Alberta) Lawes / Morris | 8

Qualifier 2
3 | (Manitoba) (Newfoundland and Labrador) Jones / Nichols | 8
6 | (Manitoba) Officer / Carruthers | 6
3 | (Manitoba) (Newfoundland and Labrador) Jones / Nichols | 3
7 | (Alberta) (Newfoundland and Labrador) Sweeting / Gushue | 10
2 | (Alberta) (Newfoundland and Labrador) Crocker / Walker | 4
7 | (Alberta) (Newfoundland and Labrador) Sweeting / Gushue | 7

==== A Semifinals ====
Friday, January 5, 15:00

| Team | 1 | 2 | 3 | 4 | 5 | 6 | 7 | 8 | Final |
| (Alberta) (Newfoundland and Labrador) Peterman / Gallant | 1 | 0 | 1 | 0 | 1 | 3 | 0 | X | 6 |
| (Alberta) (Manitoba) Carey / Hodgson | 0 | 1 | 0 | 1 | 0 | 0 | 2 | X | 4 |

| Team | 1 | 2 | 3 | 4 | 5 | 6 | 7 | 8 | Final |
| (Alberta) Ferguson / Bottcher | 1 | 0 | 3 | 0 | 0 | 2 | 0 | 0 | 6 |
| (Manitoba) (Alberta) Lawes / Morris | 0 | 1 | 0 | 2 | 1 | 0 | 3 | 1 | 8 |

| Team | 1 | 2 | 3 | 4 | 5 | 6 | 7 | 8 | Final |
| (Alberta) (Newfoundland and Labrador) Crocker / Walker | 1 | 0 | 1 | 0 | 1 | 0 | 1 | 0 | 4 |
| (Alberta) (Newfoundland and Labrador) Sweeting / Gushue | 0 | 2 | 0 | 1 | 0 | 3 | 0 | 1 | 7 |

| Team | 1 | 2 | 3 | 4 | 5 | 6 | 7 | 8 | Final |
| (Manitoba) (Newfoundland and Labrador) Jones / Nichols | 2 | 0 | 3 | 0 | 0 | 2 | 1 | X | 8 |
| (Manitoba) Officer / Carruthers | 0 | 2 | 0 | 3 | 1 | 0 | 0 | X | 6 |

==== A Finals ====
Friday, January 5, 19:00

| Team | 1 | 2 | 3 | 4 | 5 | 6 | 7 | 8 | Final |
| (Alberta) (Newfoundland and Labrador) Peterman / Gallant | 0 | 1 | 1 | 0 | 1 | 0 | 2 | 0 | 5 |
| (Manitoba) (Alberta) Lawes / Morris | 1 | 0 | 0 | 2 | 0 | 3 | 0 | 1 | 7 |

| Team | 1 | 2 | 3 | 4 | 5 | 6 | 7 | 8 | Final |
| (Manitoba) (Newfoundland and Labrador) Jones / Nichols | 0 | 0 | 2 | 0 | 0 | 1 | 0 | X | 3 |
| (Alberta) (Newfoundland and Labrador) Sweeting / Gushue | 3 | 2 | 0 | 1 | 1 | 0 | 3 | X | 10 |

=== B Bracket ===
| Semifinals | | | Qualifier 3 |
| | | | 8 | (Alberta) (Manitoba) Carey / Hodgson | 7 |
| 8 | (Alberta) (Manitoba) Carey / Hodgson | 11 | 3 | (Manitoba) (Newfoundland and Labrador) Jones / Nichols | 9 |
| 4 | (Alberta) Ferguson / Bottcher | 5 |

| Semifinals | | | Qualifier 4 |
| | | | 6 | (Manitoba) Officer / Carruthers | 5 |
| 6 | (Manitoba) Officer / Carruthers | 6 | 1 | (Alberta) (Newfoundland and Labrador) Peterman / Gallant | 8 |
| 2 | (Alberta) (Newfoundland and Labrador) Crocker / Walker | 4 |

==== B Semifinals ====
Friday, January 5, 19:00

| Team | 1 | 2 | 3 | 4 | 5 | 6 | 7 | 8 | Final |
| (Alberta) (Manitoba) Carey / Hodgson | 0 | 3 | 0 | 3 | 0 | 5 | X | X | 11 |
| (Alberta) Ferguson / Bottcher | 1 | 0 | 1 | 0 | 3 | 0 | X | X | 5 |

| Team | 1 | 2 | 3 | 4 | 5 | 6 | 7 | 8 | Final |
| (Manitoba) Officer / Carruthers | 0 | 0 | 1 | 0 | 3 | 0 | 1 | 1 | 6 |
| (Alberta) (Newfoundland and Labrador) Crocker / Walker | 1 | 1 | 0 | 1 | 0 | 1 | 0 | 0 | 4 |

==== B Finals ====
Saturday, January 6, 8:00

| Team | 1 | 2 | 3 | 4 | 5 | 6 | 7 | 8 | 9 | Final |
| (Alberta) (Manitoba) Carey / Hodgson | 0 | 3 | 0 | 0 | 1 | 0 | 3 | 0 | 0 | 7 |
| (Manitoba) (Newfoundland and Labrador) Jones / Nichols | 1 | 0 | 1 | 2 | 0 | 2 | 0 | 1 | 2 | 9 |

| Team | 1 | 2 | 3 | 4 | 5 | 6 | 7 | 8 | Final |
| (Manitoba) Officer / Carruthers | 0 | 2 | 0 | 0 | 1 | 0 | 2 | 0 | 5 |
| (Alberta) (Newfoundland and Labrador) Peterman / Gallant | 1 | 0 | 1 | 1 | 0 | 3 | 0 | 2 | 8 |

== Page playoffs ==
Page playoff system
1 | (Manitoba) (Alberta) Lawes / Morris | 4
2 | (Alberta) (Newfoundland and Labrador) Sweeting / Gushue | 9
3 | (Manitoba) (Newfoundland and Labrador) Jones / Nichols | 4
4 | (Alberta) (Newfoundland and Labrador) Peterman / Gallant | 5

Semifinal
1 | (Manitoba) (Alberta) Lawes / Morris | 7
4 | (Alberta) (Newfoundland and Labrador) Peterman / Gallant | 3

Final
2 | (Alberta) (Newfoundland and Labrador) Sweeting / Gushue | 6
1 | (Manitoba) (Alberta) Lawes / Morris | 8

=== 1 vs. 2 ===
Saturday, January 6, 15:00

| Team | 1 | 2 | 3 | 4 | 5 | 6 | 7 | 8 | Final |
| (Manitoba) (Alberta) Lawes / Morris | 0 | 3 | 0 | 1 | 0 | 0 | 0 | X | 4 |
| (Alberta) (Newfoundland and Labrador) Sweeting / Gushue | 1 | 0 | 1 | 0 | 4 | 2 | 1 | X | 9 |

Player percentages
| Manitoba Alberta | | Alberta Newfoundland and Labrador | |
|---|---|---|---|
| Kaitlyn Lawes | 68% | Valerie Sweeting | 79% |
| John Morris | 70% | Brad Gushue | 82% |
| Total | 69% | Total | 81% |

=== 3 vs. 4 ===
Saturday, January 6, 12:00

| Team | 1 | 2 | 3 | 4 | 5 | 6 | 7 | 8 | Final |
| (Manitoba) (Newfoundland and Labrador) Jones / Nichols | 0 | 0 | 0 | 1 | 1 | 1 | 1 | 0 | 4 |
| (Alberta) (Newfoundland and Labrador) Peterman / Gallant | 2 | 1 | 1 | 0 | 0 | 0 | 0 | 1 | 5 |

Player percentages
| Manitoba Newfoundland and Labrador | | Alberta Newfoundland and Labrador | |
|---|---|---|---|
| Jennifer Jones | 78% | Jocelyn Peterman | 80% |
| Mark Nichols | 79% | Brett Gallant | 89% |
| Total | 79% | Total | 85% |

=== Semifinal ===
Saturday, January 6, 19:00

| Team | 1 | 2 | 3 | 4 | 5 | 6 | 7 | 8 | Final |
| (Manitoba) (Alberta) Lawes / Morris | 2 | 0 | 2 | 0 | 2 | 0 | 1 | X | 7 |
| (Alberta) (Newfoundland and Labrador) Peterman / Gallant | 0 | 1 | 0 | 1 | 0 | 1 | 0 | X | 3 |

Player percentages
| Manitoba Alberta | | Alberta Newfoundland and Labrador | |
|---|---|---|---|
| Kaitlyn Lawes | 69% | Jocelyn Peterman | 58% |
| John Morris | 81% | Brett Gallant | 84% |
| Total | 76% | Total | 74% |

=== Final ===
Sunday, January 7, 13:00

| Team | 1 | 2 | 3 | 4 | 5 | 6 | 7 | 8 | Final |
| (Alberta) (Newfoundland and Labrador) Sweeting / Gushue | 1 | 0 | 2 | 0 | 0 | 2 | 1 | 0 | 6 |
| (Manitoba) (Alberta) Lawes / Morris | 0 | 1 | 0 | 4 | 2 | 0 | 0 | 1 | 8 |

Player percentages
| Alberta Newfoundland and Labrador | | Manitoba Alberta | |
|---|---|---|---|
| Valerie Sweeting | 70% | Kaitlyn Lawes | 77% |
| Brad Gushue | 80% | John Morris | 85% |
| Total | 76% | Total | 82% |
