= 2017 Canadian Mixed Curling Championship =

- Host city: Yarmouth, Nova Scotia
- Arena: Mariners Centre
- Dates: November 13–19, 2016
- Winner: Northern Ontario
- Curling club: Port Arthur Curling Club, Thunder Bay
- Skip: Trevor Bonot
- Third: Jackie McCormick
- Second: Kory Carr
- Lead: Megan Carr
- Finalist: Manitoba

The 2017 Canadian Mixed Curling Championship was held from November 13 to 19, 2016 at the Mariners Centre in Yarmouth, Nova Scotia. The winners of this championship represented Canada at the 2017 World Mixed Curling Championship.

Northern Ontario won the championship, the fourth national mixed title for the region.

== Teams ==
The teams are listed as follows:

Team	Skip	Third	Second	Lead	Locale
Alberta	Evan Asmussen	Lindsay Makichuk	Kyle Reynolds	Kelly Erickson	Lloydminster Curling Club, Lloydminster
British Columbia	Wes Craig	Kesa Van Osch	Miles Craig	Marika Van Osch	Nanaimo Curling Club, Nanaimo & Kerry Park Curling Club, Mill Bay
Manitoba	Braden Calvert	Kerri Einarson	Kyle Einarson	Jennifer Clark-Rouire	Gimli Curling Club, Gimli
New Brunswick	Charlie Sullivan	Leah Thompson	Ryan Freeze	Joanne Freeze	Thistle St. Andrews Curling Club, Saint John
Newfoundland and Labrador	Adam Boland	Sarah Hill	Zach Young	Brooke Godsland	RE/MAX Centre, St. John's
Northern Ontario	Trevor Bonot	Jackie McCormick	Kory Carr	Megan Carr	Port Arthur Curling Club, Thunder Bay
Northwest Territories	Donovan Arey	Eileen McKay-Saturnino	Richard Ross	Alyssa Ross	Inuvik Curling Club, Inuvik
Nova Scotia	Paul Flemming	Christie Gamble	Tyler Gamble	Teri Udle	Mayflower Curling Club, Halifax
Nunavut	Ed MacDonald	Denise Hutchings	Gregory Howard	Jenine Bodner	Iqaluit Curling Club, Iqaluit
Ontario	Wayne Tuck Jr.	Kimberly Tuck	Jake Higgs	Sara Gatchell	Ilderton Curling Club, Ilderton
Prince Edward Island	Veronica Smith	Tyler Smith	Sabrina Smith	Dylan Lowery	Cornwall Curling Club, Cornwall
Quebec	Martin Ferland	Isabelle Néron	Frédéric Marchand	Anik Brascoup	Club de curling Laviolette, Trois-Rivières
Saskatchewan	Brady Scharback	Kourtney Fesser	Jacob Hersikorn	Krista Fesser	Nutana Curling Club, Saskatoon
Yukon	Robert Smallwood	Jody Smallwood	Scott Odian	Shannon Hall	Whitehorse Curling Club, Whitehorse

== Round robin ==
=== Standings ===
Key
Teams to Championship Pool

Pool A	Skip	W	L
Ontario	Wayne Tuck Jr.	6	0
New Brunswick	Charlie Sullivan	5	1
Newfoundland and Labrador	Adam Boland	3	3
Nova Scotia	Paul Flemming	2	4
Yukon	Robert Smallwood	2	4
Prince Edward Island	Veronica Smith	2	4
Alberta	Evan Asmussen	1	5

Pool B	Skip	W	L
Saskatchewan	Brady Scharback	5	1
Northern Ontario	Trevor Bonot	5	1
Quebec	Martin Ferland	4	2
Manitoba	Braden Calvert	4	2
British Columbia	Wes Craig	2	4
Nunavut	Ed MacDonald	1	5
Northwest Territories	Donovan Arey	0	6

=== Scores ===
==== Draw 1 ====
Sunday November 13, 7:00pm

Sheet A	1	2	3	4	5	6	7	8	Final
Newfoundland and Labrador	2	1	0	4	0	0	1	X	8
Yukon	0	0	1	0	2	0	0	X	3

Sheet B	1	2	3	4	5	6	7	8	Final
Ontario	0	2	0	0	0	0	0	1	3
New Brunswick	0	0	0	2	0	0	0	0	2

Sheet C	1	2	3	4	5	6	7	8	Final
Saskatchewan	1	0	0	2	0	2	1	0	6
Quebec	0	0	1	0	2	0	0	2	5

Sheet D	1	2	3	4	5	6	7	8	Final
Northern Ontario	1	2	1	0	3	0	0	3	10
British Columbia	0	0	0	1	0	2	2	0	5

==== Draw 2 ====
Monday November 14, 2:30pm

Sheet A	1	2	3	4	5	6	7	8	Final
Northern Ontario	0	3	1	0	1	0	0	X	5
Nunavut	0	0	0	1	0	1	0	X	2

Sheet B	1	2	3	4	5	6	7	8	Final
Alberta	0	0	0	0	1	1	0	X	2
Newfoundland and Labrador	0	0	2	1	0	0	1	X	4

Sheet C	1	2	3	4	5	6	7	8	Final
New Brunswick	0	0	1	0	3	0	1	1	6
Prince Edward Island	0	1	0	1	0	1	0	0	3

Sheet D	1	2	3	4	5	6	7	8	Final
Manitoba	0	4	0	1	0	4	1	X	10
Northwest Territories	1	0	0	0	2	0	0	X	3

Sheet E	1	2	3	4	5	6	7	8	Final
Ontario	2	0	2	0	2	0	1	1	8
Nova Scotia	0	2	0	2	0	1	0	0	5

==== Draw 3 ====
Monday November 14, 7:00pm

Sheet A	1	2	3	4	5	6	7	8	Final
Prince Edward Island	0	2	0	0	0	0	0	X	2
Alberta	1	0	0	1	0	2	1	X	5

Sheet B	1	2	3	4	5	6	7	8	Final
Manitoba	0	0	1	0	0	1	0	X	2
Quebec	1	0	0	2	1	0	1	X	5

Sheet C	1	2	3	4	5	6	7	8	Final
Nova Scotia	0	1	1	0	0	2	0	1	5
Yukon	0	0	0	1	0	0	1	0	2

Sheet D	1	2	3	4	5	6	7	8	Final
Nunavut	0	0	1	1	0	0	1	X	3
Saskatchewan	0	4	0	0	0	3	0	X	7

Sheet E	1	2	3	4	5	6	7	8	Final
British Columbia	0	1	3	0	1	0	2	X	7
Northwest Territories	1	0	0	1	0	1	0	X	3

==== Draw 4 ====
Tuesday November 15, 10:00am

Sheet B	1	2	3	4	5	6	7	8	Final
Northwest Territories	0	3	0	0	0	0	1	0	4
Northern Ontario	1	0	2	1	1	1	0	1	7

Sheet C	1	2	3	4	5	6	7	8	Final
Manitoba	3	0	2	2	4	2	X	X	13
Nunavut	0	2	0	0	0	0	X	X	2

Sheet D	1	2	3	4	5	6	7	8	9	Final
Alberta	0	1	0	1	0	2	0	2	0	6
Ontario	2	0	1	0	2	0	1	0	3	9

Sheet E	1	2	3	4	5	6	7	8	Final
Newfoundland and Labrador	0	0	0	2	0	2	0	X	4
New Brunswick	1	0	1	0	2	0	2	X	6

==== Draw 5 ====
Monday November 15, 2:30pm

Sheet A	1	2	3	4	5	6	7	8	Final
British Columbia	1	0	0	1	0	0	X	X	2
Manitoba	0	3	2	0	0	2	X	X	7

Sheet B	1	2	3	4	5	6	7	8	Final
Nova Scotia	1	0	1	0	2	0	1	0	5
Prince Edward Island	0	1	0	1	0	1	0	3	6

Sheet C	1	2	3	4	5	6	7	8	Final
Northwest Territories	0	0	0	1	0	X	X	X	1
Saskatchewan	5	2	2	0	0	X	X	X	9

Sheet D	1	2	3	4	5	6	7	8	Final
Quebec	2	0	1	0	1	0	2	X	6
Nunavut	0	1	0	1	0	1	0	X	3

Sheet E	1	2	3	4	5	6	7	8	Final
Yukon	2	0	0	3	0	1	3	X	9
Alberta	0	3	1	0	2	0	0	X	6

==== Draw 6 ====
Tuesday November 15, 7:00pm

Sheet A	1	2	3	4	5	6	7	8	Final
Ontario	0	1	0	1	0	2	3	X	7
Prince Edward Island	1	0	2	0	1	0	0	X	4

Sheet B	1	2	3	4	5	6	7	8	9	Final
British Columbia	0	0	2	0	2	0	2	0	0	6
Saskatchewan	0	2	0	2	0	1	0	1	1	7

Sheet C	1	2	3	4	5	6	7	8	Final
Yukon	0	0	1	1	0	2	0	0	4
New Brunswick	3	1	0	0	1	0	1	0	6

Sheet D	1	2	3	4	5	6	7	8	Final
Nova Scotia	0	2	1	0	3	1	1	0	8
Newfoundland and Labrador	3	0	0	5	0	0	0	3	11

Sheet E	1	2	3	4	5	6	7	8	Final
Quebec	2	0	0	1	0	1	0	X	4
Northern Ontario	0	3	1	0	2	0	1	X	7

==== Draw 7 ====
Wednesday November 16, 10:00am

Sheet A	1	2	3	4	5	6	7	8	Final
New Brunswick	1	0	4	0	3	1	X	X	9
Nova Scotia	0	1	0	2	0	0	X	X	3

Sheet B	1	2	3	4	5	6	7	8	Final
Yukon	1	0	0	1	0	1	0	X	3
Ontario	0	2	2	0	2	0	1	X	7

Sheet C	1	2	3	4	5	6	7	8	Final
Quebec	0	1	0	6	0	0	1	X	8
British Columbia	0	0	2	0	1	1	0	X	4

Sheet D	1	2	3	4	5	6	7	8	Final
Saskatchewan	0	1	0	1	0	2	1	X	5
Northern Ontario	0	0	1	0	1	0	0	X	2

Sheet E	1	2	3	4	5	6	7	8	Final
Prince Edward Island	1	1	0	0	0	5	0	X	7
Newfoundland and Labrador	0	0	1	2	1	0	1	X	5

==== Draw 8 ====
Wednesday November 16, 2:30pm

Sheet A	1	2	3	4	5	6	7	8	Final
Northwest Territories	2	0	0	1	0	1	X	X	4
Quebec	0	5	4	0	4	0	X	X	13

Sheet B	1	2	3	4	5	6	7	8	Final
Northern Ontario	0	0	1	3	4	0	1	X	9
Manitoba	2	0	0	0	0	2	0	X	4

Sheet C	1	2	3	4	5	6	7	8	Final
Newfoundland and Labrador	0	1	0	0	0	0	0	X	1
Ontario	0	0	1	1	0	0	1	X	3

Sheet D	1	2	3	4	5	6	7	8	Final
New Brunswick	0	0	0	2	1	0	1	1	5
Alberta	0	1	1	0	0	2	0	0	4

Sheet E	1	2	3	4	5	6	7	8	Final
Nunavut	1	0	1	0	0	0	X	X	2
British Columbia	0	5	0	4	1	2	X	X	12

==== Draw 9 ====
Wednesday November 16, 7:00pm

Sheet B	1	2	3	4	5	6	7	8	9	Final
Nunavut	0	2	1	1	0	0	2	0	2	8
Northwest Territories	1	0	0	0	2	1	0	2	0	6

Sheet C	1	2	3	4	5	6	7	8	Final
Alberta	0	1	0	0	0	0	X	X	1
Nova Scotia	2	0	1	1	2	2	X	X	8

Sheet D	1	2	3	4	5	6	7	8	Final
Prince Edward Island	0	1	0	2	0	0	0	0	3
Yukon	1	0	2	0	2	0	1	1	7

Sheet E	1	2	3	4	5	6	7	8	Final
Saskatchewan	0	0	1	0	0	0	0	X	1
Manitoba	0	0	0	2	0	0	2	X	4

== Placement Round ==
=== Standings ===
Key
Teams to Playoffs

Championship Pool	Skip	W	L
Ontario	Wayne Tuck Jr.	10	0
Saskatchewan	Brady Scharback	8	2
Northern Ontario	Trevor Bonot	8	2
Manitoba	Braden Calvert	7	3
New Brunswick	Charlie Sullivan	6	4
Newfoundland and Labrador	Adam Boland	4	6
Quebec	Martin Ferland	4	6
Nova Scotia	Paul Flemming	3	7

Seeding Pool	Skip	W	L
British Columbia	Wes Craig	5	4
Yukon	Robert Smallwood	4	5
Alberta	Evan Asmussen	3	6
Prince Edward Island	Veronica Smith	3	6
Nunavut	Ed MacDonald	2	7
Northwest Territories	Donovan Arey	0	9

=== Scores ===
==== Draw 10 ====
Thursday November 17, 10:00am

Sheet B	1	2	3	4	5	6	7	8	Final
Prince Edward Island	1	0	1	0	0	0	1	X	3
British Columbia	0	2	0	2	2	0	0	X	6

Sheet D	1	2	3	4	5	6	7	8	Final
Nunavut	0	1	0	0	1	0	1	X	3
Alberta	1	0	1	0	0	3	0	X	5

Sheet E	1	2	3	4	5	6	7	8	Final
Yukon	6	0	6	0	5	X	X	X	17
Northwest Territories	0	1	0	1	0	X	X	X	2

==== Draw 11 ====
Thursday November 17, 2:30pm

Sheet A	1	2	3	4	5	6	7	8	Final
Alberta	2	0	0	2	5	0	X	X	9
Northwest Territories	0	1	1	0	0	1	X	X	3

Sheet B	1	2	3	4	5	6	7	8	9	Final
Quebec	0	1	0	1	0	1	0	1	0	4
Ontario	0	0	2	0	1	0	1	0	3	7

Sheet C	1	2	3	4	5	6	7	8	Final
New Brunswick	0	1	0	0	0	1	0	1	3
Manitoba	1	0	2	1	0	0	2	0	6

Sheet D	1	2	3	4	5	6	7	8	Final
Northern Ontario	1	0	2	0	0	0	2	1	6
Nova Scotia	0	1	0	0	0	1	0	0	2

Sheet E	1	2	3	4	5	6	7	8	9	Final
Newfoundland and Labrador	1	0	2	0	1	0	0	1	0	5
Saskatchewan	0	1	0	1	0	2	1	0	1	6

==== Draw 12 ====
Thursday November 17, 7:00pm

Sheet A	1	2	3	4	5	6	7	8	Final
Prince Edward Island	1	1	0	0	1	0	3	0	6
Nunavut	0	0	1	2	0	2	0	3	8

Sheet B	1	2	3	4	5	6	7	8	Final
Saskatchewan	3	1	0	0	2	0	2	X	8
Nova Scotia	0	0	1	1	0	2	0	X	4

Sheet C	1	2	3	4	5	6	7	8	Final
Newfoundland and Labrador	0	0	0	0	0	1	0	0	1
Northern Ontario	0	0	0	0	1	0	2	3	6

Sheet D	1	2	3	4	5	6	7	8	Final
Manitoba	0	3	0	2	0	1	0	0	6
Ontario	1	0	2	0	1	0	3	1	8

Sheet E	1	2	3	4	5	6	7	8	Final
New Brunswick	0	3	0	3	1	1	X	X	8
Quebec	1	0	1	0	0	0	X	X	2

==== Draw 13 ====
Friday November 18, 10:00am

Sheet A	1	2	3	4	5	6	7	8	Final
Saskatchewan	1	0	0	2	0	2	0	1	6
New Brunswick	0	1	0	0	1	0	3	0	5

Sheet B	1	2	3	4	5	6	7	8	Final
Manitoba	2	0	0	0	0	2	1	0	5
Newfoundland and Labrador	0	0	0	1	2	0	0	1	4

Sheet C	1	2	3	4	5	6	7	8	Final
Nova Scotia	1	0	0	1	1	3	X	X	6
Quebec	0	0	1	0	0	0	X	X	1

Sheet E	1	2	3	4	5	6	7	8	Final
Ontario	0	4	0	4	0	0	X	X	8
Northern Ontario	1	0	1	0	0	1	X	X	3

==== Draw 14 ====
Friday November 18, 2:30pm

Sheet B	1	2	3	4	5	6	7	8	Final
Nunavut	1	0	1	0	0	1	0	X	3
Yukon	0	3	0	1	0	0	2	X	6

Sheet C	1	2	3	4	5	6	7	8	Final
Alberta	1	0	1	1	0	1	0	0	4
British Columbia	0	1	0	0	1	0	3	1	6

Sheet D	1	2	3	4	5	6	7	8	Final
Northwest Territories	1	0	0	1	0	1	0	X	3
Prince Edward Island	0	3	1	0	3	0	2	X	9

==== Draw 15 ====
Friday November 18, 7:00pm

Sheet A	1	2	3	4	5	6	7	8	Final
Nova Scotia	0	1	1	0	0	0	0	0	2
Manitoba	1	0	0	2	0	0	0	1	4

Sheet B	1	2	3	4	5	6	7	8	Final
Northern Ontario	0	3	0	0	1	0	1	2	7
New Brunswick	1	0	0	1	0	2	0	0	4

Sheet C	1	2	3	4	5	6	7	8	Final
Ontario	2	0	0	1	0	0	3	X	6
Saskatchewan	0	1	1	0	0	1	0	X	3

Sheet D	1	2	3	4	5	6	7	8	Final
Quebec	2	0	0	0	2	0	0	X	4
Newfoundland and Labrador	0	2	2	3	0	0	2	X	9

Sheet E	1	2	3	4	5	6	7	8	Final
British Columbia	2	1	0	1	0	2	1	X	7
Yukon	0	0	2	0	2	0	0	X	4

== Playoffs ==
Semifinals
1	Ontario	2
4	Manitoba	4
2	Saskatchewan	4
3	Northern Ontario	5

Final
4	Manitoba	2
3	Northern Ontario	5

Bronze medal game
1	Ontario	6
2	Saskatchewan	4

=== Semifinals ===
Saturday, November 19, 10:00 am

Sheet B	1	2	3	4	5	6	7	8	Final
Saskatchewan	1	0	0	2	0	0	1	X	4
Northern Ontario	0	2	2	0	0	1	0	X	5

Sheet C	1	2	3	4	5	6	7	8	Final
Ontario	0	0	2	0	0	0	0	X	2
Manitoba	0	0	0	2	0	1	1	X	4

=== Bronze medal game ===
Saturday, November 19, 2:30 pm

Sheet B	1	2	3	4	5	6	7	8	9	Final
Saskatchewan	0	0	0	1	0	2	0	1	0	4
Ontario	0	2	0	0	1	0	1	0	2	6

=== Final ===
Saturday, November 19, 2:30 pm

Sheet C	1	2	3	4	5	6	7	8	Final
Manitoba	0	0	0	1	0	0	1	X	2
Northern Ontario	0	1	0	0	4	0	0	X	5
