= Caleb Flaxey =

Canadian curler

- Curler
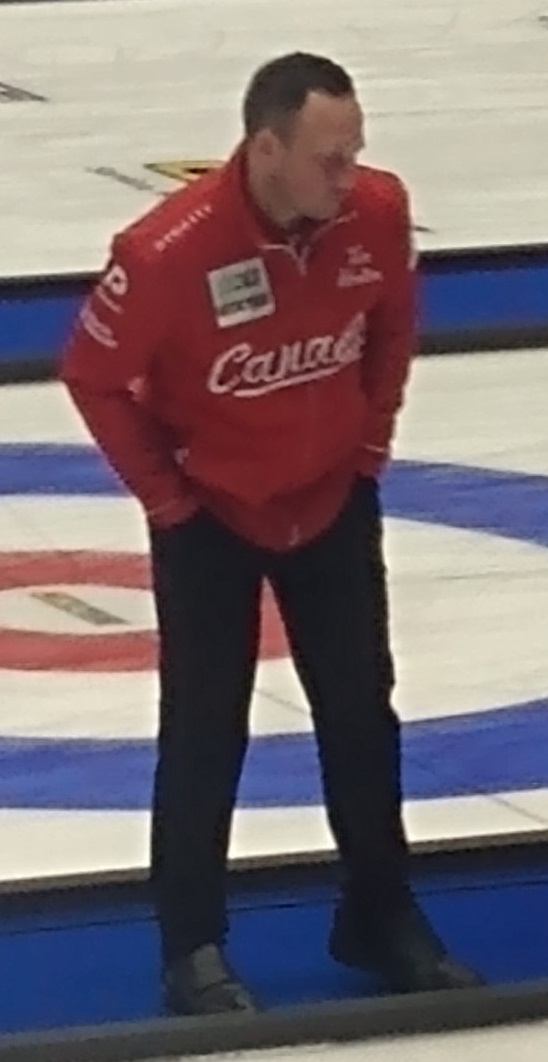
- Born: August 30, 1983 (age 43); Scarborough, Ontario

Team
- Curling club: Dixie CC, Mississauga, ON

Curling career
- Member Association: Northern Ontario (2007-2010); Ontario (2012-present)
- Brier: 2 (2008, 2010)
- Olympic: 1 (2014)
Medal record
Men's curling
Representing Canada
Olympic Games
Gold medal – first place	2014 Sochi
Representing Northern Ontario
Canadian Olympic Curling Trials
Gold medal – first place	2013 Winnipeg
Tim Hortons Brier
Bronze medal – third place	2010 Halifax

Caleb Flaxey (born August 30, 1983) is a Canadian curler from Caledon, Ontario.

Flaxey, originally from Sault Ste. Marie, Ontario, played lead for the Eric Harnden rink that represented Northern Ontario at the 2008 Tim Hortons Brier in Winnipeg, Manitoba. The team finished with a 3–8 record.

Flaxey represented Northern Ontario at the 2009 Canadian Mixed Curling Championship in Iqaluit, Nunavut, playing second for Ian Fisher. The team finished with a 6–5 record.

Flaxey joined the Brad Jacobs team in 2008, and played lead for the team for two seasons. He played for the team when they represented Northern Ontario at the 2010 Tim Hortons Brier in Halifax, Nova Scotia played at the Halifax Metro Centre. The team finished with a 9–2 record in the round robin, earning a place in the 1 vs. 2 game. They would lose to Glenn Howard from Ontario in the 1 vs. 2 game and Kevin Koe from Alberta in the semi-final.

Flaxey joined the Wayne Tuck, Jr. rink in 2012, and has since won one World Curling Tour event as part of the team, the 2013 Mount Lawn Gord Carroll Classic. They competed in the 2013 The Dominion Tankard at the Barrie Molson Centre in Barrie, Ontario finishing with a 4-6 record.

Flaxey was included on the Brad Jacobs team as alternate at the 2013 Canadian Olympic Curling Trials at the MTS Centre in Winnipeg, Manitoba. The team finished the round robin with a 7-0 record, earning a direct entry to the final. They would beat John Morris in the final and earn the right to represent Canada at the 2014 Winter Olympics. In Sochi, Russia, the team finished the round robin with 7-2 record. They defeated Liu Rui from China in the semi-final 10-6. They would meet David Murdoch from Scotland in the final, and win 9-3, becoming Olympic gold medallists.

Flaxey is currently one of the coaches the Matt Dunstone rink.

== Personal life ==
Flaxey is married to Ontario women's champion Allison Flaxey. Flaxey attended Sir James Dunn Collegiate and Vocational School for high school. He also studied Finance & Accounting at Missouri Valley College in Marshall, Missouri where he was the captain of the men's golf team and an All-American. He currently works as a category advisor for Walman Optical.
