= Kimberly Tuck =

Canadian curler

Kimberly (Kim) Tuck
- Curler
- Born: September 25, 1974 (age 52); London, Ontario

Team
- Curling club: Ilderton CC; Ilderton, ON
- Mixed doubles partner: Wayne Tuck Jr.

Curling career
- Member Association: Ontario
- Hearts: 3 (2014, 2024, 2025)
- World Mixed Doubles Championship: 1 (2014)
Medal record
Curling
Representing Ontario
Canadian Mixed Doubles Trials
Gold medal – first place	2014 Ottawa

Kimberly Tuck (née Veale; born September 25, 1974) is a Canadian curler from Strathroy, Ontario. She is a former Canadian Mixed Doubles Champion, having won the 2014 Canadian Mixed Doubles Curling Trials with her husband Wayne. She is currently the coach of the Danielle Inglis rink.

== Curling career ==
=== Juniors ===
Tuck played in both the 1990 Ontario Junior Women's Curling Championship and the 1990 Ontario Junior Mixed Championship. She also won the 1992 OFSAA championship.

=== Women's ===
As of 2021, Tuck has played in nine Ontario Scotties Tournament of Hearts (2000, 2001, 2005, 2006, 2011, 2012, 2013, 2017, 2018) the provincial women's championships. She has won four Ontario Women's Tankard events (2003, 2004, 2005 and 2008) for the Ilderton Curling Club, and also won the 2005 Ontario Women's Trophy competition.

The 2004-05 curling season was Tuck's most eventful season in her women's career. At the time, she was the lead for the Jo-Ann Rizzo rink. The team won the 2004 Shorty Jenkins Classic World Curling Tour event, and the 2004 Canada Cup East qualifier. This qualified the team for the 2005 Canada Cup of Curling, where Tuck played second on the team. After finishing with a 4–1 record in pool play, the Rizzo rink lost to Shannon Kleibrink in the playoffs. The next season, the team played in the 2005 Canadian Olympic Curling Trials, where they finished with a 2–7 record.

Later on in her career, she was the alternate for Team Ontario (skipped by Allison Flaxey) at the 2014 Scotties Tournament of Hearts and was the alternate for Sherry Middaugh at the 2017 Canadian Olympic Pre-trials. She has also played in two Grand Slam of Curling events, the 2010 Sobeys Slam (third for Jacqueline Harrison, 4–3 record), and the 2017 Masters of Curling (second for Middaugh, 0–4.)

=== Mixed ===
Tuck has found much more success in mixed curling. She was won five provincial mixed titles (2002, 2009, 2017, 2019 and 2020) playing third for her husband, Wayne. As a result, she has played in five Canadian Mixed Curling Championships representing Ontario. The team finished with a 10–1 round robin record (first place) at the 2002 Canadian Mixed Curling Championship, but lost both of their play-off games, settling for third overall. At the 2009 Canadian Mixed Curling Championship, the team finished with an 8–3 round robin record. They then won a tiebreaker, and the semifinal, before losing to Manitoba in the final. At the 2017 Canadian Mixed Curling Championship, they went 10–0 in the round robin, but again got tripped up in the playoffs, losing in the semifinal, and settling for third overall. At the 2019 Canadian Mixed Curling Championship, they went 7–3 in the round robin, and lost in the semifinal and bronze medal games. And at the 2020 Canadian Mixed Curling Championship, they did not even make the playoffs, finishing with a 5–5 record.

=== Mixed doubles ===
While at first Kim was not a fan of mixed doubles curling, she and Wayne began playing the curling variant in 2013, and have played in seven Canadian Mixed Doubles Curling Championships. Their first championship was in 2014, where they went 6–1 in pool play, and then won all three of their playoff games en route to the championship. The pair then went on to represent Canada at the 2014 World Mixed Doubles Curling Championship. There, the team went 7–1 in pool play, but were eliminated in their first playoff game in the round of 16 against Austria. The pair had less success at the 2015 Canadian Mixed Doubles Championship, failing to make it to the playoffs after posting a 3–4 record. In 2016, they again missed the playoffs after finishing 4–3. In 2017, they made it to a tiebreaker game after finishing 4–3 in their pool, but lost. The pair made it to the 2018 Championship by having to win the provincial mixed doubles title. Representing Ontario, they finished 3–4. At the 2019 Canadian Mixed Doubles Curling Championship, they finally made the playoffs again after going 5–2 in pool play. They lost in their first playoff game however, in the round of 12. After the 2020 championship was cancelled due to COVID-19, the pair played in the 2021 Canadian Mixed Doubles Curling Championship in the "Calgary Curling bubble".

In addition to playing at the Canadian Mixed Doubles championship, the pair also played in the 2018 Canadian Mixed Doubles Curling Olympic Trials, where they finished last in their pool with a 1–7 record. On the Mixed Doubles World Curling Tour, they have won two events, the 2019 Ilderton Mixed Doubles Spiel and the 2020 Stu Sells Toronto Cricket Mixed Doubles Cashspiel.

== Personal life ==
Tuck attended Medway High School in Arva, Ontario. She and Wayne Tuck Jr. have two children. Following the birth of their first child, in about 2005 or 2006, Tuck took a break from professional curling. She works in sales and marketing for the Canada Curling Stone Co. in Lobo, Ontario.
