= 2002 Canadian Mixed Curling Championship =

- Host city: Halifax, Nova Scotia
- Arena: Mayflower Curling Club, Halifax, Nova Scotia
- Dates: January 5–13
- Winner: Nova Scotia
- Curling club: Mayflower CC, Halifax, Nova Scotia
- Skip: Mark Dacey
- Third: Heather Smith-Dacey
- Second: Rob Harris
- Lead: Laine Peters
- Finalist: Prince Edward Island (John Likely)

The 2002 Canadian Mixed Curling Championship was held January 5–13 at the Mayflower Curling Club in Halifax, Nova Scotia.

== Teams ==
Province / Territory	Skip	Third	Second	Lead
Alberta	Ken Hunka	Sandy Bjornstad	Dwight Alfrey	Sandra Jenkins
British Columbia	Craig Lepine	Karen Lepine	Ian Cordner	Dolores Cordner
Manitoba	Nathan Asham	Chris Scalena	Arnold Asham (skip)	Lori Boudreau
New Brunswick	Wade Blanchard	Heidi Hanlon	Greg Hanlon	Judy Blanchard
Newfoundland and Labrador	Ken Peddigrew	Michelle Jewer	Keith Jewer	Leslie Anne Walsh
Northern Ontario	David MacInnes	Valerie MacInnes	Neil MacInnes	Judy MacInnes
Nova Scotia	Mark Dacey	Heather Smith-Dacey	Rob Harris	Laine Peters
Ontario	Wayne Tuck Jr.	Kimberly Tuck	Jake Higgs	Sara Gatchell
Prince Edward Island	John Likely	Susan McInnis	Mark Butler	Nancy Cameron
Quebec	Daniel Gregoire	Caroline Boily	Noel-Yves Perron	Caroline Perron
Saskatchewan	Gerald Shymko	Myrna Nielsen	Arnie Geisler	Lynne Doll
Yukon/Northwest Territories	Doug Bothamley	Dawn Moses	Ron Delmage	Kelly Kaylo

== Standings ==
Locale	Skip	W	L
Ontario	Wayne Tuck Jr.	10	1
Nova Scotia	Mark Dacey	10	1
Prince Edward Island	John Likely	8	3
Saskatchewan	Gerald Shymko	6	5
Alberta	Ken Hunka	6	5
British Columbia	Craig Lepine	5	6
Newfoundland and Labrador	Ken Peddigrew	5	6
Northern Ontario	David MacInnes	4	7
Yukon/Northwest Territories	Doug Bothamley	4	7
Manitoba	Arnold Asham	4	7
New Brunswick	Wade Blanchard	3	8
Quebec	Daniel Gregoire	1	10

== Results ==
=== Draw 1 ===
Sheet A	1	2	3	4	5	6	7	8	9	10	Final
Alberta (Hunka)	0	1	0	0	1	1	0	0	X	X	3
Nova Scotia (Dacey) 🔨	3	0	2	1	0	0	2	1	X	X	9

Sheet B	1	2	3	4	5	6	7	8	9	10	11	Final
Ontario (Tuck) 🔨	0	2	0	0	0	2	1	1	0	1	1	8
New Brunswick (Blanchard)	2	0	1	3	0	0	0	0	1	0	0	7

Sheet C	1	2	3	4	5	6	7	8	9	10	Final
Prince Edward Island (Likely)	0	0	2	1	3	0	2	1	X	X	9
Saskatchewan (Shymko) 🔨	0	1	0	0	0	1	0	0	X	X	2

Sheet D	1	2	3	4	5	6	7	8	9	10	Final
British Columbia (Lepine)	0	0	0	1	0	2	0	0	X	X	3
Manitoba (Asham) 🔨	2	2	4	0	1	0	2	2	X	X	13

=== Draw 2 ===
Sheet A	1	2	3	4	5	6	7	8	9	10	Final
Saskatchewan (Shymko) 🔨	0	2	0	0	1	0	0	1	0	X	4
Ontario (Tuck)	1	0	2	0	0	1	2	0	3	X	9

Sheet B	1	2	3	4	5	6	7	8	9	10	Final
Newfoundland and Labrador (Peddigrew) 🔨	0	0	2	0	1	1	0	2	0	X	6
Northern Ontario (MacInnes)	0	0	0	2	0	0	2	0	1	X	5

Sheet C	1	2	3	4	5	6	7	8	9	10	Final
Quebec (Gregoire)	0	0	1	0	2	1	1	0	0	X	5
Yukon/Northwest Territories (Bothamley) 🔨	0	1	0	1	0	0	0	1	0	X	3

Sheet D	1	2	3	4	5	6	7	8	9	10	Final
Prince Edward Island (Likely) 🔨	0	1	0	0	1	0	1	0	2	2	7
New Brunswick (Blanchard)	0	0	2	1	0	0	0	2	0	0	5

=== Draw 3 ===
Sheet B	1	2	3	4	5	6	7	8	9	10	Final
Manitoba (Asham) 🔨	0	1	0	0	0	1	0	0	X	X	2
Alberta (Hunka)	1	0	1	2	2	0	1	1	X	X	8

Sheet C	1	2	3	4	5	6	7	8	9	10	Final
British Columbia (Lepine) 🔨	0	0	2	0	1	0	1	0	1	X	5
Nova Scotia (Dacey)	0	0	0	4	0	1	0	2	0	X	7

=== Draw 4 ===
Sheet A	1	2	3	4	5	6	7	8	9	10	Final
Northern Ontario (MacInnes) 🔨	4	1	2	1	0	2	0	0	X	X	10
Quebec (Gregoire)	0	0	0	0	1	0	1	1	X	X	3

Sheet B	1	2	3	4	5	6	7	8	9	10	Final
New Brunswick (Blanchard) 🔨	1	0	1	0	0	1	0	0	1	0	4
Saskatchewan (Shymko)	0	1	0	0	1	0	2	2	0	1	7

Sheet C	1	2	3	4	5	6	7	8	9	10	Final
Ontario (Tuck) 🔨	0	0	1	2	0	3	0	1	0	0	7
Prince Edward Island (Likely)	0	0	0	0	2	0	1	0	2	1	6

Sheet D	1	2	3	4	5	6	7	8	9	10	Final
Newfoundland and Labrador (Peddigrew) 🔨	1	3	0	0	1	0	0	0	1	X	6
Yukon/Northwest Territories (Bothamley)	0	0	2	0	0	0	1	0	0	X	3

=== Draw 5 ===
Sheet A	1	2	3	4	5	6	7	8	9	10	Final
Nova Scotia (Dacey) 🔨	1	1	0	2	0	1	0	2	0	X	7
Manitoba (Asham)	0	0	0	0	0	0	2	0	1	X	3

Sheet B	1	2	3	4	5	6	7	8	9	10	11	Final
Quebec (Gregoire) 🔨	1	0	0	1	0	0	2	2	0	1	0	7
Newfoundland and Labrador (Peddigrew)	0	3	0	0	2	1	0	0	1	0	1	8

Sheet C	1	2	3	4	5	6	7	8	9	10	Final
Yukon/Northwest Territories (Bothamley) 🔨	3	0	2	1	0	0	3	0	X	X	9
Northern Ontario (MacInnes)	0	2	0	0	2	0	0	1	X	X	5

Sheet D	1	2	3	4	5	6	7	8	9	10	Final
Alberta (Hunka) 🔨	1	0	1	0	1	1	1	1	0	1	7
British Columbia (Lepine)	0	3	0	1	0	0	0	0	2	0	6

=== Draw 6 ===
Sheet A	1	2	3	4	5	6	7	8	9	10	Final
British Columbia (Lepine) 🔨	1	0	0	1	0	1	0	1	0	X	4
Prince Edward Island (Likely)	0	2	2	0	1	0	1	0	3	X	9

Sheet B	1	2	3	4	5	6	7	8	9	10	Final
Manitoba (Asham) 🔨	1	0	2	0	1	0	1	0	0	X	5
Ontario (Tuck)	0	2	0	2	0	2	0	1	1	X	8

Sheet C	1	2	3	4	5	6	7	8	9	10	11	Final
Alberta (Hunka) 🔨	1	0	1	0	0	0	2	0	2	1	0	7
Saskatchewan (Shymko)	0	3	0	1	1	1	0	1	0	0	3	10

Sheet D	1	2	3	4	5	6	7	8	9	10	Final
Nova Scotia (Dacey) 🔨	2	0	0	1	0	2	0	4	2	X	11
New Brunswick (Blanchard)	0	1	0	0	3	0	2	0	0	X	6

=== Draw 7 ===
Sheet A	1	2	3	4	5	6	7	8	9	10	Final
Ontario (Tuck) 🔨	1	0	1	0	0	1	0	0	X	X	3
Yukon/Northwest Territories (Bothamley)	0	3	0	5	1	0	1	1	X	X	11

Sheet B	1	2	3	4	5	6	7	8	9	10	Final
Prince Edward Island (Likely) 🔨	0	2	2	1	0	4	0	0	X	X	9
Northern Ontario (MacInnes)	1	0	0	0	1	0	1	0	X	X	3

Sheet C	1	2	3	4	5	6	7	8	9	10	Final
New Brunswick (Blanchard) 🔨	1	3	0	0	1	0	1	0	1	X	7
Quebec (Gregoire)	0	0	1	3	0	1	0	0	0	X	5

Sheet D	1	2	3	4	5	6	7	8	9	10	Final
Saskatchewan (Shymko) 🔨	0	0	1	1	1	0	0	2	0	0	5
Newfoundland and Labrador (Peddigrew)	0	1	0	0	0	0	3	0	0	2	6

=== Draw 8 ===
Sheet A	1	2	3	4	5	6	7	8	9	10	Final
Newfoundland and Labrador (Peddigrew) 🔨	0	1	0	2	0	0	1	0	2	0	6
Alberta (Hunka)	2	0	2	0	0	1	0	2	0	1	8

Sheet B	1	2	3	4	5	6	7	8	9	10	Final
Quebec (Gregoire) 🔨	1	0	2	0	0	0	0	0	X	X	3
Nova Scotia (Dacey)	0	6	0	3	3	0	0	1	X	X	13

Sheet C	1	2	3	4	5	6	7	8	9	10	11	Final
Northern Ontario (MacInnes) 🔨	1	0	2	0	0	2	0	0	0	0	1	6
British Columbia (Lepine)	0	2	0	0	2	0	0	0	0	1	0	5

Sheet D	1	2	3	4	5	6	7	8	9	10	Final
Yukon/Northwest Territories (Bothamley) 🔨	1	0	1	0	1	0	1	0	X	X	4
Manitoba (Asham)	0	2	0	4	0	3	0	0	X	X	9

=== Draw 9 ===
Sheet A	1	2	3	4	5	6	7	8	9	10	Final
Northern Ontario (MacInnes) 🔨	1	0	0	1	0	2	0	1	X	X	5
Nova Scotia (Dacey)	0	2	1	0	5	0	2	0	X	X	10

Sheet B	1	2	3	4	5	6	7	8	9	10	Final
Yukon/Northwest Territories (Bothamley) 🔨	1	0	4	0	3	2	0	0	2	X	12
Alberta (Hunka)	0	2	0	2	0	0	1	1	0	X	6

Sheet C	1	2	3	4	5	6	7	8	9	10	Final
Newfoundland and Labrador (Peddigrew) 🔨	0	3	0	0	2	0	1	2	0	X	8
Manitoba (Asham)	2	0	2	1	0	3	0	0	3	X	11

Sheet D	1	2	3	4	5	6	7	8	9	10	Final
Quebec (Gregoire) 🔨	1	0	0	0	0	1	0	1	X	X	3
British Columbia (Lepine)	0	3	1	1	1	0	2	0	X	X	8

=== Draw 10 ===
Sheet A	1	2	3	4	5	6	7	8	9	10	Final
Manitoba (Asham) 🔨	0	0	1	0	1	0	0	2	0	X	4
New Brunswick (Blanchard)	0	0	0	1	0	0	3	0	2	X	6

Sheet B	1	2	3	4	5	6	7	8	9	10	Final
British Columbia (Lepine) 🔨	0	1	0	1	1	0	1	1	0	1	6
Saskatchewan (Shymko)	1	0	1	0	0	1	0	0	1	0	4

Sheet C	1	2	3	4	5	6	7	8	9	10	Final
Nova Scotia (Dacey) 🔨	1	0	3	0	0	1	0	0	0	0	5
Ontario (Tuck)	0	2	0	2	0	0	0	1	0	1	6

Sheet D	1	2	3	4	5	6	7	8	9	10	Final
Alberta (Hunka) 🔨	0	0	1	0	1	0	2	0	1	1	6
Prince Edward Island (Likely)	0	0	0	1	0	1	0	2	0	0	4

=== Draw 11 ===
Sheet A	1	2	3	4	5	6	7	8	9	10	Final
Saskatchewan (Shymko) 🔨	2	1	0	2	1	0	0	2	0	0	8
Quebec (Gregoire)	0	0	2	0	0	2	1	0	1	1	7

Sheet B	1	2	3	4	5	6	7	8	9	10	Final
New Brunswick (Blanchard) 🔨	1	0	1	0	0	0	0	1	1	X	4
Newfoundland and Labrador (Peddigrew)	0	1	0	4	0	1	2	0	0	X	8

Sheet C	1	2	3	4	5	6	7	8	9	10	11	Final
Prince Edward Island (Likely) 🔨	1	0	2	0	1	0	1	2	1	0	1	9
Yukon/Northwest Territories (Bothamley)	0	3	0	1	0	2	0	0	0	2	0	8

Sheet D	1	2	3	4	5	6	7	8	9	10	Final
Ontario (Tuck) 🔨	1	0	2	0	1	0	1	0	0	3	8
Northern Ontario (MacInnes)	0	1	0	1	0	3	0	1	0	0	6

=== Draw 12 ===
Sheet A	1	2	3	4	5	6	7	8	9	10	11	Final
Prince Edward Island (Likely) 🔨	1	0	0	0	0	1	0	0	2	0	1	5
Newfoundland and Labrador (Peddigrew)	0	1	0	0	0	0	0	2	0	1	0	4

Sheet B	1	2	3	4	5	6	7	8	9	10	Final
Ontario (Tuck) 🔨	3	3	0	2	1	0	2	0	X	X	11
Quebec (Gregoire)	0	0	2	0	0	1	0	1	X	X	4

Sheet C	1	2	3	4	5	6	7	8	9	10	11	Final
Saskatchewan (Shymko) 🔨	1	1	0	0	1	0	1	0	1	0	1	6
Northern Ontario (MacInnes)	0	0	3	0	0	0	0	1	0	1	0	5

Sheet D	1	2	3	4	5	6	7	8	9	10	Final
New Brunswick (Blanchard) 🔨	1	0	2	1	0	1	0	0	1	0	6
Yukon/Northwest Territories (Bothamley)	0	2	0	0	2	0	1	1	0	2	8

=== Draw 13 ===
Sheet A	1	2	3	4	5	6	7	8	9	10	Final
Yukon/Northwest Territories (Bothamley) 🔨	0	0	0	2	2	0	0	0	X	X	4
British Columbia (Lepine)	0	1	1	0	0	3	0	4	X	X	9

Sheet B	1	2	3	4	5	6	7	8	9	10	Final
Northern Ontario (MacInnes) 🔨	0	2	0	2	1	0	2	0	0	0	7
Manitoba (Asham)	1	0	2	0	0	1	0	1	1	0	6

Sheet C	1	2	3	4	5	6	7	8	9	10	Final
Quebec (Gregoire) 🔨	1	0	0	0	1	0	2	1	0	X	5
Alberta (Hunka)	0	2	0	1	0	4	0	0	1	X	8

Sheet D	1	2	3	4	5	6	7	8	9	10	Final
Newfoundland and Labrador (Peddigrew) 🔨	1	0	0	1	0	0	1	0	1	1	5
Nova Scotia (Dacey)	0	1	1	0	2	2	0	0	0	0	6

=== Draw 14 ===
Sheet A	1	2	3	4	5	6	7	8	9	10	Final
Alberta (Hunka) 🔨	0	0	1	0	0	1	1	0	0	0	3
Ontario (Tuck)	0	2	0	0	0	0	0	1	1	1	5

Sheet B	1	2	3	4	5	6	7	8	9	10	Final
Nova Scotia (Dacey) 🔨	2	1	0	3	1	1	1	0	X	X	9
Prince Edward Island (Likely)	0	0	1	0	0	0	0	1	X	X	2

Sheet C	1	2	3	4	5	6	7	8	9	10	Final
British Columbia (Lepine) 🔨	0	2	0	0	3	0	1	0	0	1	7
New Brunswick (Blanchard)	0	0	2	1	0	1	0	1	1	0	6

Sheet D	1	2	3	4	5	6	7	8	9	10	Final
Manitoba (Asham) 🔨	1	0	1	1	0	1	0	0	X	X	4
Saskatchewan (Shymko)	0	5	0	0	4	0	1	2	X	X	12

=== Draw 15 ===
Sheet A	1	2	3	4	5	6	7	8	9	10	Final
New Brunswick (Blanchard) 🔨	1	1	1	0	1	0	1	0	1	0	6
Northern Ontario (MacInnes)	0	0	0	1	0	1	0	2	0	3	7

Sheet B	1	2	3	4	5	6	7	8	9	10	Final
Saskatchewan (Shymko) 🔨	2	0	0	2	0	2	0	3	1	X	10
Yukon/Northwest Territories (Bothamley)	0	2	1	0	1	0	2	0	0	X	6

Sheet C	1	2	3	4	5	6	7	8	9	10	Final
Ontario (Tuck) 🔨	0	0	3	0	0	2	2	0	X	X	7
Newfoundland and Labrador (Peddigrew)	0	0	0	1	1	0	0	1	X	X	3

Sheet D	1	2	3	4	5	6	7	8	9	10	Final
Prince Edward Island (Likely) 🔨	1	1	0	2	1	0	0	2	0	X	7
Quebec (Gregoire)	0	0	2	0	0	1	0	0	1	X	4

=== Draw 16 ===
Sheet A	1	2	3	4	5	6	7	8	9	10	Final
Quebec (Gregoire) 🔨	0	0	0	0	1	1	0	1	0	1	4
Manitoba (Asham)	0	0	2	0	0	0	1	0	2	0	5

Sheet B	1	2	3	4	5	6	7	8	9	10	Final
Newfoundland and Labrador (Peddigrew) 🔨	1	1	0	1	0	0	1	0	1	1	6
British Columbia (Lepine)	0	0	2	0	1	0	0	4	0	0	7

Sheet C	1	2	3	4	5	6	7	8	9	10	Final
Yukon/Northwest Territories (Bothamley) 🔨	0	0	0	2	0	0	0	1	X	X	3
Nova Scotia (Dacey)	1	1	3	0	0	2	0	0	X	X	7

Sheet D	1	2	3	4	5	6	7	8	9	10	11	Final
Northern Ontario (MacInnes) 🔨	0	1	0	0	2	0	0	1	0	1	0	5
Alberta (Hunka)	0	0	1	0	0	2	1	0	1	0	1	6

=== Draw 17 ===
Sheet A	1	2	3	4	5	6	7	8	9	10	Final
Nova Scotia (Dacey) 🔨	3	0	4	0	2	1	0	2	X	X	12
Saskatchewan (Shymko)	0	2	0	0	0	0	1	0	X	X	3

Sheet B	1	2	3	4	5	6	7	8	9	10	Final
Alberta (Hunka) 🔨	0	0	1	1	0	0	2	0	0	0	4
New Brunswick (Blanchard)	0	0	0	0	2	1	0	0	0	2	5

Sheet C	1	2	3	4	5	6	7	8	9	10	Final
Manitoba (Asham) 🔨	0	0	1	0	0	1	0	0	0	X	2
Prince Edward Island (Likely)	0	1	0	0	1	0	1	1	0	X	4

Sheet D	1	2	3	4	5	6	7	8	9	10	11	Final
British Columbia (Lepine) 🔨	0	1	0	0	0	0	0	3	0	1	0	5
Ontario (Tuck)	0	0	2	0	0	0	2	0	1	0	1	6

== Tiebreaker ==
Sheet C	1	2	3	4	5	6	7	8	9	10	11	Final
Saskatchewan (Shymko) 🔨	2	0	0	1	0	0	1	1	0	2	2	9
Alberta (Hunka)	0	0	2	0	0	4	0	0	1	0	0	7

Player percentages
Saskatchewan		Alberta	
Lynne Doll	78%	Sandra Jenkins	91%
Arnie Geisler	83%	Dwight Alfrey	78%
Myrna Nielsen	80%	Sandy Bjornstad	90%
Gerald Shymko	84%	Ken Hunka	84%
Total	81%	Total	86%

== Playoffs ==
Page playoff system
1	Ontario	4
2	Nova Scotia	8
3	Prince Edward Island	10
4	Saskatchewan	5

Semifinal
1	Ontario	5
3	Prince Edward Island	6

Final
2	Nova Scotia	6
3	Prince Edward Island	4

=== 1 vs. 2 ===
Sheet C	1	2	3	4	5	6	7	8	9	10	Final
Ontario (Tuck) 🔨	0	0	1	0	0	1	0	2	0	X	4
Nova Scotia (Dacey)	1	1	0	3	0	0	2	0	1	X	8

Player percentages
Ontario		Nova Scotia	
Sara Gatchell	81%	Laine Peters	93%
Jake Higgs	74%	Rob Harris	83%
Kimberly Tuck	82%	Heather Smith-Dacey	94%
Wayne Tuck Jr.	69%	Mark Dacey	89%
Total	77%	Total	89%

=== 3 vs. 4 ===
Sheet C	1	2	3	4	5	6	7	8	9	10	Final
Prince Edward Island (Likely) 🔨	2	0	1	3	0	4	0	0	0	X	10
Saskatchewan (Shymko)	0	1	0	0	2	0	0	2	0	X	5

Player percentages
Prince Edward Island		Saskatchewan	
Nancy Cameron	90%	Lynne Doll	85%
Mark Butler	79%	Arnie Geisler	83%
Susan McInnis	90%	Myrna Nielsen	82%
John Likely	99%	Gerald Shymko	74%
Total	89%	Total	81%

=== Semifinal ===
Sheet C	1	2	3	4	5	6	7	8	9	10	Final
Ontario (Tuck) 🔨	0	1	1	1	0	1	0	1	0	0	5
Prince Edward Island (Likely)	0	0	0	0	1	0	2	0	2	1	6

Player percentages
Ontario		Prince Edward Island	
Sara Gatchell	88%	Nancy Cameron	86%
Jake Higgs	76%	Mark Butler	90%
Kimberly Tuck	68%	Susan McInnis	63%
Wayne Tuck Jr.	71%	John Likely	76%
Total	76%	Total	79%

=== Final ===
Sheet C	1	2	3	4	5	6	7	8	9	10	Final
Nova Scotia (Dacey) 🔨	0	0	2	0	1	1	0	1	1	X	6
Prince Edward Island (Likely)	0	1	0	2	0	0	1	0	0	X	4

Player percentages
Nova Scotia		Prince Edward Island	
Laine Peters	86%	Nancy Cameron	73%
Rob Harris	89%	Mark Butler	65%
Heather Smith-Dacey	90%	Susan McInnis	73%
Mark Dacey	84%	John Likely	85%
Total	87%	Total	73%
