= Wayne Tuck Jr. =

Canadian curler

- Curler
- Born: May 12, 1976 (age 50); Winnipeg, Manitoba, Canada

Team
- Curling club: Ilderton CC; Ilderton, ON
- Skip: Wayne Tuck Jr.
- Third: Connor Lawes
- Second: Robert Currie
- Lead: Evan Lilly
- Mixed doubles partner: Kim Tuck

Curling career
- Member Association: Ontario
- Brier: 0
- Top CTRS ranking: 20th (2009-10)
- Grand Slam victories: 0
Medal record
Curling
Representing Ontario
Canadian Mixed Doubles Trials
Gold medal – first place	2014 Ottawa

Wayne Tuck Jr. (born May 12, 1976) is a Canadian curler from Strathroy, Ontario.

Tuck is a three time provincial mixed champion, having won the Ontario provincial mixed championship at the 2002, 2009 and 2017 events. At the 2002 Canadian Mixed Curling Championship, he skipped the Ontario team to a 10-1 round robin record, but they lost both their playoff matches, including the final to Nova Scotia, skipped by Mark Dacey. The 2009 Canadian Mixed Curling Championship was another successful event for Tuck, who finished the round robin with an 8-3 record. They lost again in the final, this time to Manitoba, skipped by Sean Grassie. At the 2017 Canadian Mixed Curling Championship, Tuck led his team to an undefeated record in the preliminary rounds (10-0), but lost in the semi-final to Manitoba. They would rebound to win the bronze medal, defeating Saskatchewan.

Tuck also won the Dominion Regalia Silver Tankard in 1997, skipping one of the two rinks for the champion Ilderton Curling Club.

Tuck is married to Kim Tuck (née Veale), who played third for him in all three of his provincial mixed championships. The pair won the 2014 Canadian Mixed Doubles Curling Trials and represented Canada at the 2014 World Mixed Doubles Curling Championship where they lost in the round of 16. The pair played in the 2018 Canadian Mixed Doubles Curling Olympic Trials, but finished last in their group with a 1-7 record. Later that season, the pair would win their first provincial mixed doubles title.

== Personal life ==
Tuck is employed as a "curling stone technician" for Canada Curling Stone Co. He and Kim Tuck have two children.

Wayne and Kim are co-founders and co-owners of Canada Curling Stone Co. Stones made by this company are used by Curling Canada at its major championships, including the Scotties Tournament of Hearts and Brier. Their rocks made an appearance in the 2002 movie Men With Brooms.

== Teams and events ==
=== Men's ===
Season	Skip	Third	Second	Lead	Alternate	Events
1999–00	Kevin Breivik	Jim Lyle	Wayne Tuck Jr.	Ted Smith		
2002–03	Wayne Tuck Jr.	Curtis Cassidy	Dean Palmer	Matt Firman		
2003–04	Kirk Ziola	Wayne Tuck Jr.	Darcy Tomchick	Jake Higgs		
2004–05	Tim Morrison	Wayne Tuck Jr.	Jason Boyce	Jason Curtis	Darryl Prebble	
2004–05	Wayne Tuck Jr.	Jason Boyce	Matt Paul	Jason Curtis		CCup 2005 (9th)
2005–06	Wayne Tuck Jr.	Wes Johnson	John Grant	Lyndon Blaney		
2006–07	Wayne Tuck Jr.	John Grant	Wes Johnson	Mike Callan		
2007–08	Wayne Tuck Jr.	Nick Rizzo	Codey Maus	Jeff Wilson		
2008–09	Wayne Tuck Jr.	Nick Rizzo	Codey Maus	Rob Brockbank		
2009–10	Greg Balsdon	Wayne Tuck Jr.	Don Bowser	Jason Boyce		
2010–11	Wayne Tuck Jr.	Craig Kochan	Scott McDonald	Paul Moffatt		
2011–12	Wayne Tuck Jr.	Craig Kochan	Scott McDonald	Paul Moffatt		
2012–13	Wayne Tuck Jr.	Chad Allen	Jay Allen	Caleb Flaxey		
2013–14	Wayne Tuck Jr.	Chad Allen	Jay Allen	Caleb Flaxey		
2014–15	Wayne Tuck Jr.	Chad Allen	Connor Duhaime	Chris Jay		
2015–16	Wayne Tuck Jr.	Chad Allen	Andrew Tournay	Ian Parker		
2016–17	Wayne Tuck Jr.	Chad Allen	Kurt Armstrong	Matt Pretty		
2017–18	Wayne Tuck Jr.	Chad Allen	Kurt Armstrong	Matt Pretty		
2018–19	Wayne Tuck Jr.	Kevin Flewwelling	Chad Allen	Sean Harrison		
2019–20	Wayne Tuck Jr.	Kevin Flewwelling	Chad Allen	Sean Harrison		

=== Mixed ===
Season	Skip	Third	Second	Lead	Events
2001–02	Wayne Tuck Jr.	Kimberly Tuck	Jake Higgs	Sara Gatchell	CMxCC 2002 (bronze)
2008–09	Wayne Tuck Jr.	Kimberly Tuck	Jake Higgs	Sara Jane Gatchell	CMxCC 2009 (silver)
2016–17	Wayne Tuck Jr.	Kimberly Tuck	Jake Higgs	Sara Gatchell	CMxCC 2017 (bronze)
2018–19	Wayne Tuck Jr.	Kimberly Tuck	Wesley Forget	Sara Gatchell	CMxCC 2019 (4th)

=== Mixed doubles ===
Season	Female	Male	Coach	Events
2013–14	Kimberly Tuck	Wayne Tuck Jr.	Jim Waite (WMDCC)	CMDCT 2014 (gold); WMDCC 2014 (10th)
2014–15	Kim Tuck	Wayne Tuck Jr.		CMDCT 2015 (21st)
2015–16	Kim Tuck	Wayne Tuck Jr.		CMDCT 2016 (17th)
2016–17	Kim Tuck	Wayne Tuck Jr.		CMDCT 2017 (13th)
2017–18	Kimberly Tuck	Wayne Tuck Jr.		CMDCC 2018 (21st)
2018–19	Kimberly Tuck	Wayne Tuck Jr.		CMDCC 2019 (9th)
2020–21	Kim Tuck	Wayne Tuck Jr.		CMDCC 2021 (27th)
2021–22	Kim Tuck	Wayne Tuck Jr.		
2022–23	Kim Tuck	Wayne Tuck Jr.		
