= 2016 Humpty's Champions Cup =

Grand Slam of Curling event

- Host city: Sherwood Park, Alberta
- Arena: Sherwood Park Arena Sports Centre
- Dates: April 26 – May 1
- Men's winner: (Manitoba) Reid Carruthers
- Curling club: West St. Paul CC, West St. Paul
- Skip: Reid Carruthers
- Third: Braeden Moskowy
- Second: Derek Samagalski
- Lead: Colin Hodgson
- Finalist: (Ontario) John Epping
- Women's winner: (Manitoba) Jennifer Jones
- Curling club: St. Vital CC, Winnipeg
- Skip: Jennifer Jones
- Third: Kaitlyn Lawes
- Second: Jill Officer
- Lead: Dawn McEwen
- Finalist: (Ontario) Rachel Homan

The 2016 Humpty's Champions Cup was held from April 26 to May 1 at the Sherwood Park Arena Sports Centre in Sherwood Park, Alberta. This was the final Grand Slam event of the 2015–16 curling season and is the seventh men's Grand Slam and the sixth women's Grand Slam of the season. The teams were split into 3 round-robin pools of 5 teams each, and the top eight teams overall will qualify for the playoff round.

Teams from the Winnipeg area won both the men's and women's events, with Reid Carruthers winning his first slam as a skip on the men's side and Jennifer Jones winning her 12th slam on the women's side. Both Carruthers and Jones happened to qualify for the Champions Cup by winning the same event, the DeKalb Superspiel.

== Men ==
=== Teams ===
The teams are listed as follows:

Skip	Third	Second	Lead	Locale
Reid Carruthers	Braeden Moskowy	Derek Samagalski	Colin Hodgson	Winnipeg, Manitoba
Brady Clark	Greg Persinger	Colin Hufman	Philip Tilker	(United States) Seattle, Washington
Benoît Schwarz (fourth)	Claudio Pätz	Peter de Cruz (skip)	Valentin Tanner	Geneva, Switzerland
Niklas Edin	Oskar Eriksson	Kristian Lindström	Christoffer Sundgren	Karlstad, Sweden
John Epping	Mat Camm	Patrick Janssen	Tim March	Toronto, Ontario
Brad Gushue	Mark Nichols	Brett Gallant	Geoff Walker	St. John's, Newfoundland and Labrador
Kevin Koe	Marc Kennedy	Brent Laing	Ben Hebert	Calgary, Alberta
Steve Laycock	Kirk Muyres	Colton Flasch	Dallan Muyres	Saskatoon, Saskatchewan
Mick Lizmore	Daylan Vavrek	Tom Appelman	Carter Lautner	Edmonton, Alberta
Mike McEwen	Jon Mead	Matt Wozniak	Denni Neufeld	Winnipeg, Manitoba
Shaun Meachem	Catlin Schneider	Brady Scharback	Aaron Shutra	Saskatoon, Saskatchewan
Bruce Mouat	Bobby Lammie	Gregor Cannon	Angus Dowell	Edinburgh, Scotland
David Murdoch	Greg Drummond	Scott Andrews	Michael Goodfellow	Stirling, Scotland
John Shuster	Tyler George	Matt Hamilton	Chris Plys	(United States) Duluth, Minnesota
Pat Simmons	Carter Rycroft	Tom Sallows	Nolan Thiessen	Calgary, Alberta

=== Round Robin Standings ===
Pool A	W	L	SO#
(Newfoundland and Labrador) Brad Gushue	3	1	2
(Manitoba) Reid Carruthers	3	1	12
(Sweden) Niklas Edin	2	2	9
(Scotland) Bruce Mouat	2	2	14
(United States) John Shuster	0	4	6

Pool B	W	L	SO#
(Alberta) Kevin Koe	3	1	5
(Saskatchewan) Steve Laycock	2	2	3
(Alberta) Pat Simmons	2	2	4
(Switzerland) Peter de Cruz	2	2	10
(Alberta) Mick Lizmore	1	3	15

Pool C	W	L	SO#
(Manitoba) Mike McEwen	4	0	8
(Ontario) John Epping	3	1	1
(Scotland) David Murdoch	2	2	11
(United States) Brady Clark	1	3	7
(Saskatchewan) Shaun Meachem	0	4	13

==== Draw 1 ====
Tuesday, April 26, 7:00 pm

Team	1	2	3	4	5	6	7	8	Final
(Alberta) Kevin Koe 🔨	3	0	0	2	0	3	X	X	8
(Alberta) Mick Lizmore	0	2	0	0	1	0	X	X	3

Team	1	2	3	4	5	6	7	8	Final
(Newfoundland and Labrador) Brad Gushue 🔨	1	0	0	2	0	4	0	0	7
(Scotland) Bruce Mouat	0	1	1	0	1	0	2	1	6

==== Draw 2 ====
Wednesday, April 27, 8:30 am

Team	1	2	3	4	5	6	7	8	Final
(Scotland) David Murdoch	1	1	3	0	1	1	X	X	7
(Saskatchewan) Shaun Meachem 🔨	0	0	0	2	0	0	X	X	2

Team	1	2	3	4	5	6	7	8	Final
(Saskatchewan) Steve Laycock 🔨	1	0	1	0	3	0	0	X	5
(Switzerland) Peter de Cruz	0	4	0	2	0	0	4	X	10

Team	1	2	3	4	5	6	7	8	Final
(Sweden) Niklas Edin 🔨	0	2	2	0	2	0	0	1	7
(United States) John Shuster	2	0	0	1	0	1	1	0	5

==== Draw 3 ====
Wednesday, April 27, 12:00 pm

Team	1	2	3	4	5	6	7	8	Final
(Manitoba) Mike McEwen 🔨	1	1	0	1	1	2	X	X	6
(United States) Brady Clark	0	0	1	0	0	0	X	X	1

Team	1	2	3	4	5	6	7	8	9	Final
(Alberta) Pat Simmons 🔨	2	0	0	0	1	0	2	2	0	7
(Alberta) Mick Lizmore	0	2	1	3	0	1	0	0	1	8

Team	1	2	3	4	5	6	7	8	Final
(Manitoba) Reid Carruthers	1	1	0	0	4	0	2	X	8
(Scotland) Bruce Mouat 🔨	0	0	1	1	0	2	0	X	4

==== Draw 4 ====
Wednesday, April 27, 3:30 pm

Team	1	2	3	4	5	6	7	8	Final
(Ontario) John Epping 🔨	0	2	0	3	0	4	X	X	9
(Saskatchewan) Shaun Meachem	0	0	3	0	1	0	X	X	4

==== Draw 5 ====
Wednesday, April 27, 7:30 pm

Team	1	2	3	4	5	6	7	8	Final
(Alberta) Kevin Koe	0	2	0	3	0	4	X	X	9
(Switzerland) Peter de Cruz 🔨	0	0	1	0	1	0	X	X	2

Team	1	2	3	4	5	6	7	8	Final
(Newfoundland and Labrador) Brad Gushue 🔨	0	2	0	1	0	0	2	X	5
(United States) John Shuster	0	0	1	0	1	0	0	X	2

Team	1	2	3	4	5	6	7	8	Final
(Saskatchewan) Steve Laycock 🔨	3	0	4	0	2	X	X	X	9
(Alberta) Mick Lizmore	0	0	0	1	0	X	X	X	1

==== Draw 6 ====
Thursday, April 28, 8:30 am

Team	1	2	3	4	5	6	7	8	Final
(Manitoba) Mike McEwen	0	3	1	0	2	0	2	X	8
(Ontario) John Epping 🔨	2	0	0	1	0	1	0	X	4

Team	1	2	3	4	5	6	7	8	Final
(Sweden) Niklas Edin 🔨	0	1	0	2	0	2	0	0	5
(Scotland) Bruce Mouat	0	0	3	0	1	0	1	1	6

Team	1	2	3	4	5	6	7	8	Final
(United States) Brady Clark 🔨	0	2	0	0	0	0	0	X	2
(Scotland) David Murdoch	1	0	2	0	0	2	1	X	6

==== Draw 7 ====
Thursday, April 28, 12:30 pm

Team	1	2	3	4	5	6	7	8	Final
(Manitoba) Reid Carruthers 🔨	2	3	0	2	0	0	X	X	7
(United States) John Shuster	0	0	2	0	0	1	X	X	3

==== Draw 8 ====
Thursday, April 28, 4:00 pm

Team	1	2	3	4	5	6	7	8	Final
(Alberta) Pat Simmons 🔨	0	2	0	2	0	1	X	X	5
(Switzerland) Peter de Cruz	0	0	1	0	0	0	X	X	1

Team	1	2	3	4	5	6	7	8	Final
(Ontario) John Epping	0	3	0	2	0	3	0	1	9
(Scotland) David Murdoch 🔨	2	0	2	0	1	0	2	0	7

Team	1	2	3	4	5	6	7	8	Final
(United States) Brady Clark 🔨	3	0	2	0	3	0	0	X	8
(Saskatchewan) Shaun Meachem	0	2	0	1	0	1	1	0	5

==== Draw 9 ====
Thursday, April 28, 7:30 pm

Team	1	2	3	4	5	6	7	8	Final
(Alberta) Kevin Koe	1	0	0	1	0	1	1	0	4
(Switzerland) Steve Laycock 🔨	0	2	1	0	2	0	0	1	6

Team	1	2	3	4	5	6	7	8	Final
(Newfoundland and Labrador) Brad Gushue	0	2	0	0	0	1	0	0	3
(Sweden) Niklas Edin 🔨	1	0	1	0	0	0	0	2	4

==== Draw 10 ====
Friday, April 29, 8:30 am

Team	1	2	3	4	5	6	7	8	Final
(United States) John Shuster	1	0	0	1	0	0	X	X	2
(Scotland) Bruce Mouat 🔨	0	2	1	0	2	2	X	X	7

==== Draw 11 ====
Friday, April 29, 12:30 pm

Team	1	2	3	4	5	6	7	8	Final
(Manitoba) Mike McEwen	0	4	1	0	1	1	0	X	7
(Saskatchewan) Shaun Meachem 🔨	1	0	0	1	0	0	1	X	3

Team	1	2	3	4	5	6	7	8	Final
(Sweden) Niklas Edin 🔨	2	0	0	0	0	X	X	X	2
(Manitoba) Reid Carruthers	0	2	2	2	1	X	X	X	7

Team	1	2	3	4	5	6	7	8	Final
(Alberta) Kevin Koe 🔨	2	0	2	0	2	0	1	2	9
(Alberta) Pat Simmons	0	3	0	1	0	1	0	0	5

==== Draw 12 ====
Friday, April 29, 4:00 pm

Team	1	2	3	4	5	6	7	8	Final
(Ontario) John Epping 🔨	2	0	3	0	0	2	0	X	7
(United States) Brady Clark	0	1	0	1	0	0	1	X	3

==== Draw 13 ====
Friday, April 29, 7:30 pm

Team	1	2	3	4	5	6	7	8	Final
(Newfoundland and Labrador) Brad Gushue 🔨	2	1	0	2	1	0	X	X	6
(Manitoba) Reid Carruthers	0	0	1	0	0	2	X	X	3

Team	1	2	3	4	5	6	7	8	Final
(Switzerland) Peter de Cruz	1	0	3	1	0	0	2	X	7
(Alberta) Mick Lizmore 🔨	0	1	0	0	1	0	0	X	2

Team	1	2	3	4	5	6	7	8	Final
(Saskatchewan) Steve Laycock 🔨	0	1	0	2	0	1	0	0	4
(Alberta) Pat Simmons	0	0	1	0	2	0	1	2	6

Team	1	2	3	4	5	6	7	8	Final
(Manitoba) Mike McEwen 🔨	1	0	0	2	0	0	3	X	6
(Scotland) David Murdoch	0	1	0	0	1	1	0	X	3

=== Tiebreakers ===
Saturday, April 30, 9:00 am

Team	1	2	3	4	5	6	7	8	Final
(Saskatchewan) Steve Laycock	0	2	0	2	0	0	1	2	7
(Scotland) Bruce Mouat 🔨	2	0	1	0	0	0	0	0	3

Player percentages
(Saskatchewan) Team Laycock		(Scotland) Team Mouat	
Dallan Muyres	97%	Angus Dowell	86%
Colton Flasch	86%	Gregor Cannon	87%
Kirk Muyres	90%	Bobby Lammie	84%
Steve Laycock	84%	Bruce Mouat	66%
Total	89%	Total	80%

Team	1	2	3	4	5	6	7	8	Final
(Alberta) Pat Simmons 🔨	1	0	3	0	2	2	X	X	8
(Scotland) David Murdoch	0	1	0	1	0	0	X	X	2

Player percentages
(Alberta) Team Simmons		(Scotland) Team Murdoch	
Nolan Thiessen	80%	Michael Goodfellow	91%
Tom Sallows	98%	Scott Andrews	86%
Carter Rycroft	86%	Greg Drummond	73%
Pat Simmons	90%	David Murdoch	66%
Total	88%	Total	79%

Team	1	2	3	4	5	6	7	8	Final
(Sweden) Niklas Edin	0	0	1	0	1	1	0	3	6
(Switzerland) Peter de Cruz 🔨	2	1	0	1	0	0	1	0	5

Player percentages
(Sweden) Team Edin		(Switzerland) Team de Cruz	
Christoffer Sundgren	88%	Valentin Tanner	86%
Kristian Lindström	93%	Peter de Cruz	94%
Oskar Eriksson	76%	Claudio Pätz	87%
Niklas Edin	87%	Benoit Schwarz	81%
Total	86%	Total	87%

=== Playoffs ===
Quarterfinals
(Manitoba) Mike McEwen	7
(Sweden) Niklas Edin	1
(Alberta) Kevin Koe	3
(Manitoba) Reid Carruthers	4
(Ontario) John Epping	5
(Alberta) Pat Simmons	4
(Newfoundland and Labrador) Brad Gushue	8
(Saskatchewan) Steve Laycock	3

Semifinals
(Manitoba) Mike McEwen	3
(Manitoba) Reid Carruthers	4
(Ontario) John Epping	5
(Newfoundland and Labrador) Brad Gushue	2

Final
(Manitoba) Reid Carruthers	4
(Ontario) John Epping	3

==== Quarterfinals ====
Saturday, April 30, 5:00 pm

Team	1	2	3	4	5	6	7	8	Final
(Manitoba) Mike McEwen 🔨	2	0	0	0	5	X	X	X	7
(Sweden) Niklas Edin	0	1	0	0	0	X	X	X	1

Player percentages
(Manitoba) Team McEwen		(Sweden) Team Edin	
Denni Neufeld	89%	Christoffer Sundgren	95%
Matt Wozniak	96%	Kristian Lindström	92%
B. J. Neufeld	95%	Oskar Eriksson	66%
Mike McEwen	98%	Niklas Edin	87%
Total	94%	Total	85%

Team	1	2	3	4	5	6	7	8	Final
(Alberta) Kevin Koe	0	0	0	0	2	0	1	0	3
(Manitoba) Reid Carruthers 🔨	0	2	0	0	0	1	0	1	4

Player percentages
(Alberta) Team Koe		(Manitoba) Team Carruthers	
Ben Hebert	93%	Colin Hodgson	94%
Brent Laing	91%	Derek Samagalski	98%
Marc Kennedy	91%	Braeden Moskowy	94%
Kevin Koe	92%	Reid Carruthers	96%
Total	91%	Total	95%

Team	1	2	3	4	5	6	7	8	Final
(Ontario) John Epping 🔨	0	0	1	2	0	0	0	2	5
(Alberta) Pat Simmons	0	1	0	0	2	1	0	0	4

Player percentages
(Ontario) Team Epping		(Alberta) Team Simmons	
Tim March	93%	Nolan Thiessen	80%
Patrick Janssen	68%	Tom Sallows	89%
Mathew Camm	72%	Carter Rycroft	69%
John Epping	79%	Pat Simmons	81%
Total	78%	Total	80%

Team	1	2	3	4	5	6	7	8	Final
(Newfoundland and Labrador) Brad Gushue 🔨	0	2	0	1	4	0	1	X	8
(Saskatchewan) Steve Laycock	0	0	2	0	0	1	0	X	3

Player percentages
(Newfoundland and Labrador) Team Gushue		(Saskatchewan) Team Laycock	
Geoff Walker	85%	Dallan Muyres	96%
Brett Gallant	86%	Colton Flasch	93%
Mark Nichols	97%	Kirk Muyres	82%
Brad Gushue	98%	Steve Laycock	78%
Total	91%	Total	87%

==== Semifinals ====
Saturday, April 30, 8:30 pm

Team	1	2	3	4	5	6	7	8	Final
(Manitoba) Mike McEwen 🔨	0	1	0	0	0	2	0	0	3
(Manitoba) Reid Carruthers	0	0	1	0	0	0	2	1	4

Player percentages
(Manitoba) Team McEwen		(Manitoba) Team Carruthers	
Denni Neufeld	84%	Colin Hodgson	93%
Matt Wozniak	78%	Derek Samagalski	79%
B. J. Neufeld	72%	Braeden Moskowy	86%
Mike McEwen	82%	Reid Carruthers	73%
Total	79%	Total	83%

Team	1	2	3	4	5	6	7	8	Final
(Ontario) John Epping 🔨	0	2	0	0	2	1	0	X	5
(Newfoundland and Labrador) Brad Gushue	0	0	1	0	0	0	1	X	2

Player percentages
(Ontario) Team Epping		(Newfoundland and Labrador) Team Gushue	
Tim March	86%	Geoff Walker	91%
Patrick Janssen	86%	Brett Gallant	82%
Mathew Camm	100%	Mark Nichols	97%
John Epping	92%	Brad Gushue	73%
Total	91%	Total	86%

==== Final ====
Carruthers wins his first Slam as a skip in a rare second extra end.
Sunday, May 1, 6:00 pm

Team	1	2	3	4	5	6	7	8	9	10	Final
(Manitoba) Reid Carruthers 🔨	0	0	0	1	0	0	2	0	0	1	4
(Ontario) John Epping	0	0	0	0	2	0	0	1	0	0	3

Player percentages
(Manitoba) Team Carruthers		(Ontario) Team Epping	
Colin Hodgson	82%	Tim March	99%
Derek Samagalski	94%	Patrick Janssen	91%
Braeden Moskowy	79%	Mathew Camm	80%
Reid Carruthers	84%	John Epping	83%
Total	85%	Total	88%

== Women ==
=== Teams ===
The teams are listed as follows:

Skip	Third	Second	Lead	Locale
Chelsea Carey	Amy Nixon	Jocelyn Peterman	Laine Peters	Calgary, Alberta
Kerri Einarson	Selena Kaatz	Liz Fyfe	Kristin MacCuish	Winnipeg, Manitoba
Kristin Clarke	Sarah Daniels	Karlee Burgess	Janique LeBlanc	Chester, Nova Scotia
Allison Flaxey	Clancy Grandy	Lynn Kreviazuk	Morgan Court	Caledon, Ontario
Satsuki Fujisawa	Mari Motohashi	Chinami Yoshida	Yumi Suzuki	Kitami, Japan
Jacqueline Harrison	Janet Murphy	Stefanie Matheson	Melissa Foster	Mississauga, Ontario
Rachel Homan	Emma Miskew	Joanne Courtney	Lisa Weagle	Ottawa, Ontario
Jennifer Jones	Kaitlyn Lawes	Jill Officer	Dawn McEwen	Winnipeg, Manitoba
Stefanie Lawton	Beth Iskiw	Sherri Singler	Marliese Kasner	Saskatoon, Saskatchewan
Krista McCarville	Kendra Lilly	Ashley Sippala	Sarah Potts	Thunder Bay, Ontario
Eve Muirhead	Nadine Lehmann	Vicki Adams	Sarah Reid	Stirling, Scotland
Ayumi Ogasawara	Sayaka Yoshimura	Kaho Onodera	Anna Ohmiya	Sapporo, Japan
Kelsey Rocque	Laura Crocker	Taylor McDonald	Jen Gates	Edmonton, Alberta
Val Sweeting	Lori Olson-Johns	Dana Ferguson	Rachelle Brown	Edmonton, Alberta
Silvana Tirinzoni	Manuela Siegrist	Esther Neuenschwander	Marlene Albrecht	Aarau, Switzerland

=== Round Robin Standings ===
Pool A	W	L	SO#
(Ontario) Rachel Homan	3	1	3
(Alberta) Val Sweeting	3	1	7
(Japan) Satsuki Fujisawa	2	2	9
(Ontario) Jacqueline Harrison	1	3	12
(Ontario) Krista McCarville	1	3	6

Pool B	W	L	SO#
(Manitoba) Jennifer Jones	3	1	15
(Manitoba) Kerri Einarson	3	1	2
(Saskatchewan) Stefanie Lawton	2	2	5
(Ontario) Allison Flaxey	1	3	10
(Scotland) Eve Muirhead	1	3	14

Pool C	W	L	SO#
(Japan) Ayumi Ogasawara	4	0	1
(Alberta) Kelsey Rocque	2	2	4
(Switzerland) Silvana Tirinzoni	2	2	13
(Nova Scotia) Kristin Clarke	1	3	8
(Alberta) Chelsea Carey	1	3	11

==== Draw 1 ====
Tuesday, April 26, 7:00 pm

Team	1	2	3	4	5	6	7	8	Final
(Alberta) Chelsea Carey	1	0	0	1	0	3	0	0	5
(Alberta) Kelsey Rocque 🔨	0	1	0	0	1	0	1	1	4

Team	1	2	3	4	5	6	7	8	Final
(Ontario) Rachel Homan	0	1	0	2	0	1	0	1	5
(Alberta) Val Sweeting 🔨	1	0	1	0	1	0	1	0	4

==== Draw 2 ====
Wednesday, April 27, 8:30 am

Team	1	2	3	4	5	6	7	8	Final
(Scotland) Eve Muirhead	0	1	0	0	0	1	1	X	2
(Manitoba) Kerri Einarson 🔨	1	0	2	1	2	0	1	X	7

Team	1	2	3	4	5	6	7	8	9	Final
(Saskatchewan) Stefanie Lawton	0	0	1	1	0	0	2	0	1	5
(Ontario) Allison Flaxey 🔨	0	1	0	0	1	1	0	1	0	4

==== Draw 3 ====
Wednesday, April 27, 12:00 pm

Team	1	2	3	4	5	6	7	8	Final
(Japan) Ayumi Ogasawara 🔨	0	0	1	0	0	2	0	1	4
(Switzerland) Silvana Tirinzoni	1	0	0	1	0	0	1	0	3

Team	1	2	3	4	5	6	7	8	Final
(Japan) Satsuki Fujisawa 🔨	2	0	0	0	1	0	0	1	4
(Ontario) Jacqueline Harrison	0	0	1	0	0	1	0	0	2

==== Draw 4 ====
Wednesday, April 27, 3:30 pm

Team	1	2	3	4	5	6	7	8	Final
(Ontario) Jennifer Jones 🔨	2	0	2	3	3	X	X	X	10
(Ontario) Allison Flaxey	0	1	0	0	0	X	X	X	1

Team	1	2	3	4	5	6	7	8	Final
(Alberta) Val Sweeting	0	0	2	0	2	0	3	0	7
(Ontario) Krista McCarville 🔨	1	1	0	1	0	2	0	1	6

Team	1	2	3	4	5	6	7	8	Final
(Scotland) Eve Muirhead	2	2	1	1	0	0	1	X	7
(Saskatchewan) Stefanie Lawton 🔨	0	0	0	0	1	1	0	X	2

Team	1	2	3	4	5	6	7	8	9	Final
(Nova Scotia) Kristin Clarke 🔨	1	0	1	0	0	0	1	1	1	5
(Alberta) Chelsea Carey	0	2	0	1	0	1	0	0	0	4

==== Draw 5 ====
Wednesday, April 27, 7:30 pm

Team	1	2	3	4	5	6	7	8	9	Final
(Japan) Satsuki Fujisawa	0	1	1	3	0	0	1	0	1	7
(Ontario) Rachel Homan 🔨	0	0	0	0	2	1	0	3	0	6

Team	1	2	3	4	5	6	7	8	Final
(Alberta) Kelsey Rocque	0	1	0	1	2	0	0	0	4
(Japan) Ayumi Ogasawara 🔨	2	0	1	0	0	1	1	1	6

==== Draw 6 ====
Thursday, April 28, 8:30 am

Team	1	2	3	4	5	6	7	8	Final
(Switzerland) Silvana Tirinzoni	1	0	0	1	0	0	2	0	4
(Alberta) Kelsey Rocque 🔨	0	0	1	0	0	1	0	3	5

==== Draw 7 ====
Thursday, April 28, 12:30 pm

Team	1	2	3	4	5	6	7	8	Final
(Manitoba) Jennifer Jones 🔨	0	2	0	0	2	0	0	0	4
(Saskatchewan) Stefanie Lawton	0	0	1	2	0	1	0	1	5

Team	1	2	3	4	5	6	7	8	Final
(Alberta) Kelsey Rocque 🔨	2	0	1	0	1	3	0	X	7
(Nova Scotia) Kristin Clarke	0	1	0	1	0	0	2	X	4

Team	1	2	3	4	5	6	7	8	Final
(Manitoba) Kerri Einarson 🔨	2	0	1	0	2	1	0	1	7
(Ontario) Allison Flaxey	0	1	0	2	0	0	2	0	5

Team	1	2	3	4	5	6	7	8	Final
(Ontario) Jacqueline Harrison 🔨	0	4	5	1	X	X	X	X	10
(Ontario) Krista McCarville	0	0	0	0	X	X	X	X	0

==== Draw 8 ====
Thursday, April 28, 4:00 pm

Team	1	2	3	4	5	6	7	8	Final
(Switzerland) Silvana Tirinzoni	0	3	0	2	0	2	0	1	8
(Alberta) Chelsea Carey 🔨	2	0	2	0	1	0	1	0	6

Team	1	2	3	4	5	6	7	8	Final
(Alberta) Val Sweeting 🔨	0	0	5	3	2	X	X	X	10
(Japan) Satsuki Fujisawa	0	0	0	0	0	X	X	X	0

==== Draw 9 ====
Thursday, April 28, 7:30 pm

Team	1	2	3	4	5	6	7	8	Final
(Nova Scotia) Kristin Clarke	3	0	0	1	0	0	1	0	5
(Japan) Ayumi Ogasawara 🔨	0	0	2	0	1	1	0	2	6

Team	1	2	3	4	5	6	7	8	Final
(Ontario) Krista McCarville 🔨	0	0	1	0	0	0	0	X	1
(Ontario) Rachel Homan	2	0	0	0	0	2	3	X	7

Team	1	2	3	4	5	6	7	8	Final
(Scotland) Eve Muirhead	0	0	0	0	0	2	0	X	2
(Manitoba) Jennifer Jones 🔨	0	0	0	2	2	0	2	X	6

==== Draw 10 ====
Friday, April 29, 8:30 am

Team	1	2	3	4	5	6	7	8	Final
(Manitoba) Kerri Einarson 🔨	0	3	1	0	2	0	0	X	6
(Saskatchewan) Stefanie Lawton	0	0	0	1	0	2	1	X	4

Team	1	2	3	4	5	6	7	8	Final
(Ontario) Jacqueline Harrison	0	1	0	0	0	0	1	0	2
(Alberta) Val Sweeting 🔨	1	0	0	2	1	1	0	1	6

==== Draw 11 ====
Friday, April 29, 12:30 pm

Team	1	2	3	4	5	6	7	8	9	Final
(Alberta) Chelsea Carey 🔨	0	1	0	0	0	1	0	1	0	3
(Japan) Ayumi Ogasawara	0	0	1	1	0	0	1	0	2	5

Team	1	2	3	4	5	6	7	8	Final
(Scotland) Eve Muirhead	0	0	1	0	2	0	1	0	4
(Ontario) Allison Flaxey 🔨	2	1	0	2	0	1	0	1	7

==== Draw 12 ====
Friday, April 29, 4:00 pm

Team	1	2	3	4	5	6	7	8	Final
(Ontario) Rachel Homan	0	1	0	3	1	1	0	X	6
(Manitoba) Jacqueline Harrison 🔨	2	0	1	0	0	0	1	X	4

Team	1	2	3	4	5	6	7	8	9	Final
(Japan) Satsuki Fujisawa	0	2	0	0	1	0	0	1	0	4
(Ontario) Krista McCarville 🔨	1	0	1	1	0	0	1	0	1	5

Team	1	2	3	4	5	6	7	8	Final
(Switzerland) Silvana Tirinzoni	0	2	0	3	0	4	X	X	9
(Nova Scotia) Kristin Clarke 🔨	1	0	1	0	1	0	X	X	3

Team	1	2	3	4	5	6	7	8	Final
(Manitoba) Jennifer Jones	0	4	1	0	0	4	X	X	9
(Manitoba) Kerri Einarson 🔨	1	0	0	1	0	0	X	X	2

=== Tiebreaker ===
Friday, April 29, 7:30 pm

Team	1	2	3	4	5	6	7	8	Final
(Japan) Satsuki Fujisawa 🔨	2	0	0	0	0	3	1	0	6
(Switzerland) Silvana Tirinzoni	0	3	1	2	0	0	0	1	7

Player percentages
(Japan) Team Fujisawa		(Switzerland) Team Tirinzoni	
Yurika Yoshida	89%	Marlene Albrecht	82%
Yumi Suzuki	87%	Esther Neuenschwander	77%
Chinami Yoshida	87%	Manuela Siegrist	89%
Satsuki Fujisawa	71%	Silvana Tirinzoni	75%
Total	84%	Total	81%

=== Playoffs ===
Quarterfinals
(Japan) Ayumi Ogasawara	4
(Switzerland) Silvana Tirinzoni	9
(Alberta) Val Sweeting	3
(Manitoba) Jennifer Jones	6
(Manitoba) Kerri Einarson	7
(Saskatchewan) Stefanie Lawton	2
(Ontario) Rachel Homan	6
(Alberta) Kelsey Rocque	5

Semifinals
(Switzerland) Silvana Tirinzoni	4
(Manitoba) Jennifer Jones	7
(Manitoba) Kerri Einarson	3
(Ontario) Rachel Homan	4

Final
(Manitoba) Jennifer Jones	7
(Ontario) Rachel Homan	5

==== Quarterfinals ====
Saturday, April 30, 12:30 pm

Team	1	2	3	4	5	6	7	8	Final
(Japan) Ayumi Ogasawara 🔨	0	2	0	1	0	1	X	X	4
(Switzerland) Silvana Tirinzoni	3	0	2	0	4	0	X	X	9

Player percentages
(Japan) Team Ogasawara		(Switzerland) Team Tirinzoni	
Anna Ohmiya	77%	Marlene Albrecht	75%
Kaho Onodera	69%	Esther Neuenschwander	78%
Sayaka Yoshimura	64%	Manuela Siegrist	70%
Ayumi Ogasawara	71%	Silvana Tirinzoni	96%
Total	70%	Total	80%

Team	1	2	3	4	5	6	7	8	Final
(Alberta) Val Sweeting	0	0	1	0	1	1	0	X	3
(Manitoba) Jennifer Jones 🔨	2	0	0	2	0	0	2	X	6

Player percentages
(Alberta) Team Sweeting		(Manitoba) Team Jones	
Rachel Brown	100%	Dawn McEwen	82%
Dana Ferguson	77%	Jill Officer	90%
Lori Olson-Johns	92%	Kaitlyn Lawes	94%
Val Sweeting	78%	Jennifer Jones	90%
Total	87%	Total	89%

Team	1	2	3	4	5	6	7	8	Final
(Manitoba) Kerri Einarson 🔨	2	1	1	0	2	0	1	X	7
(Saskatchewan) Stefanie Lawton	0	0	0	1	0	1	0	X	2

Player percentages
(Manitoba) Team Einarson		(Saskatchewan) Team Lawton	
Kristin MacCuish	75%	Marliese Kasner	88%
Liz Fyfe	94%	Sherri Singler	75%
Selena Kaatz	95%	Beth Iskiw	84%
Kerri Einarson	81%	Stefanie Lawton	67%
Total	86%	Total	79%

Team	1	2	3	4	5	6	7	8	Final
(Ontario) Rachel Homan 🔨	2	0	0	2	0	1	0	1	6
(Alberta) Kelsey Rocque	0	1	0	0	2	0	2	0	5

Player percentages
(Ontario) Team Homan		(Alberta) Team Rocque	
Lisa Weagle	96%	Jen Gates	85%
Joanne Courtney	73%	Taylor McDonald	76%
Emma Miskew	86%	Laura Crocker	73%
Rachel Homan	74%	Kelsey Rocque	86%
Total	82%	Total	80%

==== Semifinals ====
Saturday, April 30, 8:30 pm

Team	1	2	3	4	5	6	7	8	Final
(Switzerland) Silvana Tirinzoni	0	0	1	1	2	0	0	X	4
(Manitoba) Jennifer Jones 🔨	2	1	0	0	0	2	2	X	7

Player percentages
(Switzerland) Team Tirinzoni		(Manitoba) Team Jones	
Marlene Albrecht	91%	Dawn McEwen	99%
Esther Neuenschwander	76%	Jill Officer	93%
Manuela Siegrist	79%	Kaitlyn Lawes	94%
Silvana Tirinzoni	67%	Jennifer Jones	68%
Total	79%	Total	89%

Team	1	2	3	4	5	6	7	8	Final
(Manitoba) Kerri Einarson	0	0	0	1	0	0	2	0	3
(Ontario) Rachel Homan 🔨	0	1	1	0	0	1	0	1	4

Player percentages
(Manitoba) Team Einarson		(Ontario) Team Homan	
Kristin MacCuish	74%	Lisa Weagle	84%
Liz Fyfe	65%	Joanne Courtney	87%
Selena Kaatz	81%	Emma Miskew	86%
Kerri Einarson	91%	Rachel Homan	81%
Total	78%	Total	85%

==== Final ====
Sunday, May 1, 2:30 pm

Team	1	2	3	4	5	6	7	8	Final
(Manitoba) Jennifer Jones 🔨	2	0	0	2	0	3	0	X	7
(Ontario) Rachel Homan	0	0	1	0	2	0	2	X	5

Player percentages
(Manitoba) Team Jones		(Ontario) Team Homan	
Dawn McEwen	100%	Lisa Weagle	83%
Jill Officer	84%	Joanne Courtney	88%
Kaitlyn Lawes	91%	Emma Miskew	76%
Jennifer Jones	93%	Rachel Homan	93%
Total	92%	Total	85%

== Qualification process ==
The Champions Cup will involve 15 men's and 15 women's winners on the Pinty's GSOC season plus champions from select events, including the Tim Hortons Brier, Scotties Tournament of Hearts, World/Regional Championships, and other highly ranked competitive events on the World Curling Tour.

The winning teams at the events listed below will receive invites to the Champions Cup. For Men's Qualifying, the top 3 ranked WCT event winners will be invited. For Women's Qualifying the top 4 ranked WCT event winners will be invited.

In the event a team wins more than one qualifying event (e.g. Team A wins the Masters and Canadian Open or wins multiple events including other WCT events), the winner of the next highest ranked World Curling Tour event based on Strength of Field Multiplier (SFM), that has not qualified through another path, will be invited to complete the 15-team lineup.

[Teams listed below under WCT Event will be updated as necessary/weekly based on qualifiers from other events and WCT events yet to be played that may have higher SFM ratings]

=== Men ===
Qualification method (Note: World Curling Tour (WCT) events shown are the 6 highest ranked that have winners not qualified through other routes.)	Qualifying team	Scenario if team has already qualified	Notes
Winner of 2015 GSOC Tour Challenge	(Alberta) Kevin Koe	None (first qualifier)	..
Winner of 2015 GSOC The Masters	(Manitoba) Mike McEwen	None (first qualifier)	..
Winner of 2015 GSOC The National	(Newfoundland and Labrador) Brad Gushue	None (first qualifier)	..
Winner of 2015 European Championship	(Sweden) Niklas Edin	None (first qualifier)	
Winner of 2015 Asia/Pacific Championship	(South Korea) ~~Kim Soo-hyuk~~	None (first qualifier)	..
Winner of 2015 GSOC Canadian Open	(Ontario) John Epping	None (first qualifier)	
Winner of 2016 U.S. National Championship	(United States) Brady Clark	None (first qualifier)	
Winner of 2016 World Junior Championship	(Scotland) Bruce Mouat	None (first qualifier)	
Winner of 2016 Tim Hortons Brier	(Alberta) Kevin Koe	WCT #4 Event Winner (not already qualified)	
Winner of 2016 GSOC The Elite 10	(Newfoundland and Labrador) Brad Gushue	WCT #5 Event Winner (not already qualified)	
Winner of 2016 World Championship	(Alberta) Kevin Koe	WCT #6 Event Winner (not already qualified)	
Winner of 2016 GSOC The Players' Championship	(Newfoundland and Labrador) Brad Gushue	WCT #7 Event Winner (not already qualified)	
WCT #1 - Winner of 2015-16 Ranked Event	(Saskatchewan) Steve Laycock	None (first qualifier)	Canad Inns Prairie Classic
WCT #2 - Winner of 2015-16 Ranked Event	(Manitoba) Reid Carruthers	None (first qualifier)	DEKALB Superspiel
WCT #3 - Winner of 2015-16 Ranked Event	(Alberta) Pat Simmons	None (first qualifier)	Ed Werenich Golden Wrench Classic
WCT #4 - Winner of 2015-16 Ranked Event	(New Brunswick) ~~James Grattan~~	None (first qualifier)	Curling Masters Champéry
WCT #5 - Winner of 2015-16 Ranked Event	(Switzerland) Peter de Cruz	None (first qualifier)	CookstownCash presented by Comco Canada Inc.
WCT #6 - Winner of 2015-16 Ranked Event	(Scotland) David Murdoch	None (first qualifier)	German Masters
WCT #7 - Winner of 2015-16 Ranked Event	(Alberta) Mick Lizmore	None (first qualifier)	Red Deer Curling Classic
WCT #8 - Winner of 2015-16 Ranked Event	(United States) John Shuster	None (first qualifier)	Huron ReproGraphics Oil Heritage Classic
WCT #9 - Winner of 2015-16 Ranked Event	(British Columbia) ~~Jim Cotter~~	None (first qualifier)	2015 GSOC Tour Challenge Tier 2
WCT #10 - Winner of 2015-16 Ranked Event	(Saskatchewan) Shaun Meachem	None (first qualifier)	HDF Insurance Shoot-Out

==== WCT events ranked by Strength of field multiplier ====
#	Event	SFM	Winner	Notes
1	~~Canada Cup~~	12.3398	(Alberta) Kevin Koe	Qualified as winner of GSOC Tour Challenge
2	Canad Inns Prairie Classic	10.2848	(Saskatchewan) Steve Laycock	
3	StuSells Toronto Tankard	9.6856	(Manitoba) Mike McEwen	Qualified as winner of the Masters
4	Point Optical Curling Classic	8.9400	(Manitoba) Mike McEwen	Qualified as winner of the Masters
5	AMJ Campbell Shorty Jenkins Classic	8.5618	(Newfoundland and Labrador) Brad Gushue	Qualified as winner of the National
6	Challenge Chateau Cartier de Gatineau	8.3482	(Newfoundland and Labrador) Brad Gushue	Qualified as winner of the National
7	Stu Sells Oakville Tankard	7.6891	(Newfoundland and Labrador) Brad Gushue	Qualified as winner of the National
8	Swiss Cup Basel	7.4140	(Newfoundland and Labrador) Brad Gushue	Qualified as winner of the National
9	ASHAM U.S. Open of Curling	6.9443	(Ontario) John Epping	Qualified as winner of the Canadian Open
10	Mercure Perth Masters	6.9111	(Alberta) Kevin Koe	Qualified as winner of GSOC Tour Challenge
11	Direct Horizontal Drilling Fall Classic	6.9063	(Alberta) Kevin Koe	Qualified as winner of GSOC Tour Challenge
12	Baden Masters	6.7331	(Sweden) Niklas Edin	Qualified as winner of the European Championship
13	DEKALB Superspiel	6.6604	(Manitoba) Reid Carruthers	
14	Ed Werenich Golden Wrench Classic	5.9194	(Alberta) Pat Simmons	
15	~~Scottish Men's Curling Championship~~	5.4464	(Scotland) Tom Brewster	
16	Curling Masters Champéry	5.3906	(New Brunswick) James Grattan	
17	CookstownCash presented by Comco Canada Inc.	5.2560	(Switzerland) Peter de Cruz	
18	German Masters	5.2265	(Scotland) David Murdoch	
19	Aberdeen International Curling Championship	5.1254	(Scotland) David Murdoch	Also won German Masters
20	Red Deer Curling Classic	5.1130	(Alberta) Mick Lizmore	
21	Huron ReproGraphics Oil Heritage Classic	4.9185	(United States) John Shuster	
22	Dave Jones Stanhope Simpson Mayflower Cashspiel	4.8522	(Newfoundland and Labrador) Brad Gushue	Qualified as winner of the National
23	2015 GSOC Tour Challenge Tier 2	4.7469	(British Columbia) Jim Cotter	
24	HDF Insurance Shoot-Out	4.3313	(Saskatchewan) Shaun Meachem	

=== Women ===
Qualification method	Qualifying team	Scenario if team has already qualified	Notes
Winner of 2015 GSOC Tour Challenge	(Switzerland) Silvana Tirinzoni	None (first qualifier)	..
Winner of 2015 GSOC The Masters	(Ontario) Rachel Homan	None (first qualifier)	..
Winner of 2015 Asia/Pacific Championship	(Japan) Satsuki Fujisawa	None (first qualifier)	..
Winner of 2015 GSOC The National	(Ontario) Rachel Homan	WCT #5 Event Winner (not already qualified)	..
Winner of 2015 European Championship	(Russia) ~~Anna Sidorova~~	None (first qualifier)	
Winner of 2015 GSOC The Canadian Open	(Ontario) Rachel Homan	WCT #6 Event Winner (not already qualified)	
Winner of 2016 U.S. National Championship	(United States) ~~Erika Brown~~	None (first qualifier)	
Winner of 2016 Scotties Tournament of Hearts	(Alberta) Chelsea Carey	None (first qualifier)	
Winner of 2016 World Junior Championship	(Nova Scotia) Mary Fay	None (first qualifier)	
Winner of 2016 World Championship	(Switzerland) ~~Binia Feltscher~~		
Winner of 2016 GSOC The Players' Championship	(Scotland) Eve Muirhead		Apr 12-17, 2016
WCT #1 - Winner of 2015-16 Ranked Event	(South Korea) ~~Kim Eun-jung~~	None (first qualifier)	Canad Inns Women's Classic
WCT #2 - Winner of 2015-16 Ranked Event	(Manitoba) Jennifer Jones	None (first qualifier)	DEKALB Superspiel
WCT #3 - Winner of 2015-16 Ranked Event	(Ontario) Krista McCarville	None (first qualifier)	Colonial Square Ladies Classic
WCT #4 - Winner of 2015-16 Ranked Event	(Saskatchewan) Stefanie Lawton	None (first qualifier)	Prestige Hotels & Resorts Curling Classic
WCT #5 - Winner of 2015-16 Ranked Event	(Manitoba) Kerri Einarson	None (first qualifier)	GSOC Tour Challenge Tier 2
WCT #6 - Winner of 2015-16 Ranked Event	(Alberta) Kelsey Rocque	None (first qualifier)	Red Deer Curling Classic
WCT #7 - Winner of 2015-16 Ranked Event	(Japan) Ayumi Ogasawara	None (first qualifier)	Karuizawa International
WCT #8 - Winner of 2015-16 Ranked Event	(Alberta) Val Sweeting	None (first qualifier)	HDF Insurance Shoot-Out
WCT #9 - Winner of 2015-16 Ranked Event	(Ontario) Jacqueline Harrison	None (first qualifier)	Royal LePage OVCA Women's Fall Classic
WCT #10 - Winner of 2015-16 Ranked Event	(South Korea) ~~Gim Un-chi~~	None (first qualifier)	Hub International Crown of Curling
WCT #11 - Winner of 2015-16 Ranked Event	(Manitoba) ~~Michelle Montford~~	None (first qualifier)	Mother Club Fall Curling Classic
WCT #12 - Winner of 2015-16 Ranked Event	(Ontario) Allison Flaxey	None (first qualifier)	KW Fall Classic

==== WCT events ranked by Strength of field multiplier ====
#	Event	SFM	Winner	Notes
1	~~Canada Cup~~	11.3942	(Ontario) Rachel Homan	Qualified as winner of the Masters
2	Curlers Corner Autumn Gold Curling Classic	9.8287	(Ontario) Rachel Homan	Qualified as winner of the Masters
3	Stockholm Ladies Cup	9.3825	(Ontario) Rachel Homan	Qualified as winner of the Masters
4	Stu Sells Oakville Tankard	9.2888	(Ontario) Rachel Homan	Qualified as winner of the Masters
5	Canad Inns Women's Classic	8.9805	(South Korea) Kim Eun-jung	
6	DEKALB Superspiel	8.3844	(Manitoba) Jennifer Jones	
7	Women's Masters Basel	7.9080	(Russia) Anna Sidorova	Qualified as winner of the European Championships
8	Colonial Square Ladies Classic	7.8630	(Ontario) Krista McCarville	
9	International Bernese Ladies Cup	7.6385	(Switzerland) Silvana Tirinzoni	Qualified as winner of the GSOC Tour Challenge
10	Prestige Hotels & Resorts Curling Classic	7.0452	(Saskatchewan) Stefanie Lawton	
11	CCT Uiseong Masters	6.7763	(Alberta) Kelsey Rocque	Also won Red Deer Curling Classic
12	City of Perth Ladies International	6.3695	(Scotland) Eve Muirhead	Qualified as winner of the Players' Championship
13	GSOC Tour Challenge Tier 2	6.3163	(Manitoba) Kerri Einarson	
14	ASHAM U.S. Open of Curling	5.8912	(Ontario) Krista McCarville	Also won Colonial Square Ladies Classic
15	Red Deer Curling Classic	5.8630	(Alberta) Kelsey Rocque	
16	Karuizawa International	5.6963	(Japan) Ayumi Ogasawara	
17	HDF Insurance Shoot-Out	5.5352	(Alberta) Valerie Sweeting	
18	Glynhill Ladies International	5.3796	(Switzerland) Silvana Tirinzoni	Qualified as winner of the GSOC Tour Challenge
19	Royal LePage OVCA Women's Fall Classic	4.9870	(Ontario) Jacqueline Harrison	
20	AMJ Campbell Shorty Jenkins Classic	4.9281	(South Korea) Kim Eun-jung	Also won Canad Inns Women's Classic
21	~~Swiss Women's Curling Championship~~	4.7595	(Switzerland) Binia Feltscher	Also won World Championship
22	~~Ontario Scotties~~	4.7580	(Ontario) Jenn Hanna	
23	Hub International Crown of Curling	4.6459	(South Korea) Gim Un-chi	
24	StuSells Toronto Tankard	4.2152	(United States) Erika Brown	Qualified as U.S Champion
25	Mother Club Fall Curling Classic	4.2120	(Manitoba) Michelle Montford	
26	KW Fall Classic	4.1840	(Ontario) Allison Flaxey	
