= Kelsey Calvert =

Canadian curler (born 1994)

- Curler
- Born: Kelsey Rocque; March 25, 1994 (age 32); Fort Saskatchewan, Alberta

Team
- Curling club: Assiniboine Memorial CC, Winnipeg, MB
- Skip: Kelsey Calvert
- Third: Beth Peterson
- Second: Katherine Remillard
- Lead: Melissa Gordon-Kurz
- Mixed doubles partner: Braden Calvert

Curling career
- Member Association: Alberta (2013–2023); Manitoba (2023–present)
- Hearts: 3 (2020, 2024, 2026)
- Other appearances: WJCC: 2 (2014, 2015)
- Top CTRS ranking: 5th (2017–18)
Medal record
Women's curling
Representing Canada
World Junior Curling Championships
Gold medal – first place	2015 Tallinn
Gold medal – first place	2014 Flims
Winter Universiade
Gold medal – first place	2017 Almaty
Representing Manitoba
Scotties Tournament of Hearts
Bronze medal – third place	2024 Calgary

Kelsey Elizabeth Calvert (née Rocque; born March 25, 1994) is a Canadian curler residing in Carberry, Manitoba. She currently skips her own team of Winnipeg. She is a two-time World Junior champion skip.

== Career ==
=== Juniors ===
In 2013, Calvert played for her first University Championship, at the 2013 CIS/CCA Curling Championships in Kamloops, British Columbia, for the University of Alberta Pandas. There, she would go 6–1 in the round robin and it would earn her a spot in the semifinals. She then, would play the Saint Mary's Huskies and win in an 8–2 decision. She would then go on to play in the final against the Manitoba Bisons and lose in a 9–7 decision. Calvert would win the silver medal, and be named to the First All Star team at the skip position. Calvert would also play in the Alberta Junior Curling Championship that year. They went 6–1 in the round robin which gave them a berth in the final. There they would lose to Karynn Flory.

In 2014, Calvert and her team of third Keely Brown, second Taylor McDonald, lead Claire Tully and coach Amanda-Dawn Coderre competed once again in the Alberta Junior Curling Championship and this time they would win, with a 6–5 win over 2012 Canadian Junior champion Jocelyn Peterman. This earned them the right to represent Alberta at the 2014 Canadian Junior Curling Championships in Liverpool, Nova Scotia. Calvert went undefeated in her round robin pool which gave her a berth in the championship pool. She finished 9–1 after the championship pool, with her only loss coming at the hands of Nova Scotia's Mary Fay. This meant that Calvert and her team would go directly to the final, where they would face British Columbia's Kalia Van Osch. Calvert and her team led the entire game and had an inturn hit for the win and the championship. They won in a 7–6 decision. Calvert was named to the First All Star team at the skip position, with a player percentage of 79 throughout round robin play. At the 2014 World Junior Curling Championships, Calvert finished the round robin with a 7–2 record, losing only to Russia and South Korea's Kim Kyeong-ae. Calvert would again face South Korea in the 1 vs. 2 page playoff, but this time would win in a 7–6 decision. Calvert and her team would play South Korea again in the final, but would win in a 6–4 decision to capture the gold medal and the championship. It was the first time a Canadian Women's team would win the championship since 2003.

Calvertalso played for the University of Alberta (The Pandas) team, for the second time, in the 2014 CIS/CCA Curling Championships. The Pandas went 6–1 in the round robin, which gave them a bye to the final. They would lose the final however, in a 9–4 decision, to the Carleton Ravens, earning her a second silver medal. Calvert had the second highest skip percentage at the end of the round robin, which would lead her to be named to the second All Star Team at the skip position.

In 2015, Calvert and her new team (her old team having aged out) of Danielle Schmiemann, Holly Jamieson and Jesse Iles would compete for and win her second Alberta Junior Curling Championship, earning her and her team a berth at the 2015 Canadian Junior Curling Championships in Corner Brook where she defended her title with her new team by going 9–1 in the round robin giving her a birth to the final, where they won against Ontario's Chelsea Brandwood 8–2. She joined Cathy King, Suzanne Birt, and Kaitlyn Lawes as the fourth junior woman skip to win back-to-back Canadian Junior Curling Championships titles. Calvert would cap the season off by going undefeated to win the 2015 World Junior Curling Championships, becoming the first Canadian skip to win back to back women's world junior championships.

Later on that year, Calvert would skip her University of Alberta Panda's team at a third CIS/CCA Curling Championships. This time, they would go on to win the championship, and get the chance to represent Canada at the 2016 Winter Universiade. Calvert has also won two juvenile Alberta titles.

=== Women's ===
==== Alberta (2015–2023) ====
Following the 2014–15 season, it was announced that Calvert, aging out of juniors, would join Chelsea Carey's old rink, with Taylor McDonald at second, Jen Gates at lead, and Laura Crocker at the third position. In their first season together, the Rocque rink won the Red Deer Curling Classic and the CCT Uiseong Masters on the tour. The team played in five slams, making it to the quarterfinals in four events. Team Rocque played in the 2016 Alberta Scotties Tournament of Hearts, but failed to make the playoffs. The team also played in the 2015 Canada Cup of Curling, but finished with a 2–4 record, missing the playoffs. The following season, the team had less success on the tour. They would play in four slams, making it to the quarterfinals in just one event, the 2016 GSOC Tour Challenge. The team played in the 2016 Canada Cup of Curling, but once again missed the playoffs with a 2–4 record. In the 2017–18 season, Team Rocque would win the Curl Mesabi Classic and would play in three slams, making it to the quarterfinals at just the 2018 Meridian Canadian Open. The team played in the 2017 Canadian Olympic Curling Pre-Trials, losing in the playoffs. Midway through the season, Walker took over skipping duties of the team, but remained throwing third stones. The Rocque rink played with the new arrangement at the 2018 Alberta Scotties Tournament of Hearts, where they narrowly missed the playoffs. The next month it was announced that the team would be splitting up. For the 2018–19 season, Calvert reunited with her junior team of Danielle Schmiemann, Rebecca Konschuh and Jesse Iles. The team made it all the way to the final of the 2019 Alberta Scotties Tournament of Hearts where they lost to Chelsea Carey 8–3.

The team had a strong 2019–20 season, starting it off with a semifinal finish at the 2019 Cameron's Brewing Oakville Fall Classic. The team qualified for the playoffs at the 2019 Tour Challenge Grand Slam event where they lost to eventual winners Anna Hasselborg. Going into the 2020 Alberta Scotties Tournament of Hearts, Rocque was the number one seeded team, earning their spot through the CTRS points leader berth. They went 6–1 through the round robin, with their only loss to the Laura Walker. They would play Walker again in the 1 vs. 2 game where they lost 7–1. They had a strong semifinal game, able to easily defeat Krysta Hilker 8–1 setting up the third match for Calvert and Walker during the competition. The team struggled during the final, not able to figure out the ice and losing the final for the second straight year in a row. Calvert still got to participate in the 2020 Scotties Tournament of Hearts as the alternate for the Walker rink. Calvert played in two games at the Hearts, and the team finished pool play with a 3–4 record, failing to qualify for the championship round. It would be the team's last event of the season as both the Players' Championship and the Champions Cup Grand Slam events were cancelled due to the COVID-19 pandemic. On March 18, 2020, it was announced that both Becca Hebert and Jesse Marlow would be leaving the team. Calvert and Schmiemann then announced on March 21 that Dana Ferguson and Rachelle Brown would be joining them for the 2020–21 season.

Due to the pandemic, most of the tour events during the 2020–21 season were cancelled. Team Rocque played only one competitive game together during the entire season at the Okotoks Ladies Classic in November. After the first draw, the event was cancelled due to a province-wide shutdown in Alberta. Due to the COVID-19 pandemic in Alberta, the 2021 provincial championship was also cancelled. As the reigning provincials champions, Team Laura Walker were chosen to represent Alberta at the 2021 Scotties Tournament of Hearts. However, due to many provinces cancelling their provincial championships as a result of the COVID-19 pandemic in Canada, Curling Canada added three Wild Card teams to the national championship, which were based on the CTRS standings from the 2019–20 season. Team Rocque was one of the top three non-qualified teams, but they did not retain at least three of their four players from the previous season, meaning they could not qualify for the national championship.

In their first event of the 2021–22 season, Team Rocque reached the quarterfinals of the 2021 Alberta Curling Series: Saville Shoot-Out. Due to the pandemic, the qualification process for the 2021 Canadian Olympic Curling Trials had to be modified to qualify enough teams for the championship. In these modifications, Curling Canada created the 2021 Canadian Curling Trials Direct-Entry Event, an event where five teams would compete to try to earn one of three spots into the 2021 Canadian Olympic Curling Trials. Team Rocque qualified for the Trials Direct-Entry Event due to their CTRS ranking from the 2019–20 season. At the event, the team went 3–1 through the round robin, enough to secure their spot at the Olympic Trials. Next, Team Rocque played in both the 2021 Masters and the 2021 National Grand Slam events. After failing to reach the playoffs at the Masters, the team made it all the way to the semifinals of the National where they were defeated by Tracy Fleury. It was the furthest Calvert had ever advanced in a Grand Slam event. A few weeks later, they competed in the Olympic Trials, held November 20 to 28 in Saskatoon, Saskatchewan. At the event, the team began by losing five of their first six games. They then won their final two games, which included a victory over Kerri Einarson, to finish in seventh place with a 3–5 record. In their final game against Einarson, the team shot a high 95% which included a 94% game by Calvert. Team Rocque then competed in the 2022 Alberta Scotties Tournament of Hearts, where they posted a 6–1 record through the round robin. This created a three-way tie between Team Rocque, Laura Walker and the Casey Scheidegger rink, however, as Walker had to best draw shot challenge between the three rinks, they advanced directly to the final. In the semifinal, Team Rocque fell 10–7 to Team Scheidegger, eliminating them from contention. On March 21, 2022, the team announced that they would be staying together despite the Olympic quadrennial coming to an end.

Team Rocque began the 2022–23 season at the 2022 Saville Shoot-Out where they missed the playoffs with a 3–2 record. The team next played in the 2022 PointsBet Invitational. They defeated Christina Black in the first round before losing to Kerri Einarson in the quarterfinals. Team Rocque were invited to compete in the 2022 Tour Challenge Tier 2 event where they qualified for the playoffs with a 3–1 record. They then lost to Clancy Grandy 7–4 in the quarterfinals. After winning the last chance qualifier in Rimbey, the team qualified for the 2023 Alberta Scotties Tournament of Hearts. There, Team Rocque had mixed results, ultimately missing the playoffs with a 4–3 record. The team announced on February 6, 2023, that they would be parting ways. At the end of the season, Calvert spared for Beth Peterson at the Best of the West U30 event. The team made it to the final where they were defeated by Corryn Brown.

==== Manitoba (2023–present) ====
Calvert would join the Beth Peterson team out of Manitoba as their new third, alongside Katherine Doerksen and Melissa Gordon-Kurz. The 2023–24 season was moderately successful for the team, as they won the MCT Shootout in September and the MCT Championships in January. They also reached a pair of semifinals and made it to the quarterfinals of the Red Deer Curling Classic, before losing to the country's number one ranked team, Rachel Homan, who ultimately won the event. At the 2024 Manitoba Scotties Tournament of Hearts, Team Peterson made it to the championship round with a 3–2 record, and then won four straight to earn a spot in the semifinal, where they defeated Kate Cameron 8–4. That put them up into the final against Kaitlyn Lawes and in a very tight game, they lost 9–8. Calvert however, joined the Cameron rink, who qualified due to their CTRS standings, as their second at the 2024 Scotties Tournament of Hearts, replacing Taylor McDonald who was on maternity leave. Throughout the preliminary round, Team Cameron had mixed results but managed to win both their games on the final day of round robin to earn a championship round berth. There, they knocked off the four-time defending champions Team Kerri Einarson to earn a spot in the final four. After defeating Alberta's Selena Sturmay in the 3 vs. 4 game, they came up short against Jennifer Jones in the semifinal, earning the bronze medal.

The following season, Team Peterson defended their title at the MCT Championships and lost the final of the MCT Curling Cup and the MCT Showdown. They also competed in the 2024 Tour Challenge Tier 2 where they lost in the quarterfinals to Sayaka Yoshimura. At the 2025 RME Women of the Rings, the provincial championship, the team finished 5–3 through the round robin and championship pools, earning a tiebreaker berth where they eliminated Hailey McFarlane. They then beat Darcy Robertson in the semifinal before coming up short again in the final to Cameron, finishing second.

Team Peterson began the 2025–26 season at the 2025 Masters Tier 2 Grand Slam where they finished 1–3. Next, the team played in the 2025 PointsBet Invitational, qualifying through the CTRS rankings. There, they finished 2–2, securing wins over Kaitlyn Lawes and Myla Plett. They then played in the 2025 Canadian Olympic Curling Pre-Trials where they had a disappointing last place finish. After the event, Calvert and Peterson switched positions, with Calvert taking over as skip of the team prior to the 2026 RME Women of the Rings. This switch paid off as after losing the final for two consecutive years, Calvert won her first Manitoba Women's Championship, beating Team Lawes 9–7 in the final. This earned the team the right to represent Manitoba at the 2026 Scotties Tournament of Hearts in Mississauga, Ontario. At the 2026 Scotties, Team Peterson would finish round-robin play with a perfect 8–0 record, qualifying for the playoffs. However in the playoffs, they would then lose to Kerri Einarson and Selena Sturmay, finishing in 5th place.

== Personal life ==
She is a third cousin to Canadian curler Marcel Rocque, who played for the Randy Ferbey rink. She is employed as a family liaison officer with the Department of Defence. She is married to fellow curler Braden Calvert, and has one child.

== Grand Slam record ==
Key
C	Champion
F	Lost in Final
SF	Lost in Semifinal
QF	Lost in Quarterfinals
R16	Lost in the round of 16
Q	Did not advance to playoffs
T2	Played in Tier 2 event
DNP	Did not participate in event
N/A	Not a Grand Slam event that season

Event	2015–16	2016–17	2017–18	2018–19	2019–20	2020–21	2021–22	2022–23	2023–24	2024–25	2025–26
Masters	DNP	Q	DNP	DNP	Q	N/A	Q	DNP	DNP	DNP	T2
Tour Challenge	QF	QF	T2	T2	QF	N/A	N/A	T2	DNP	T2	DNP
The National	QF	Q	Q	DNP	Q	N/A	SF	DNP	DNP	DNP	DNP
Canadian Open	Q	Q	QF	DNP	Q	N/A	N/A	DNP	DNP	DNP	DNP
Players'	QF	DNP	DNP	DNP	N/A	DNP	DNP	DNP	DNP	DNP	DNP
Champions Cup	QF	DNP	DNP	DNP	N/A	DNP	DNP	DNP	N/A	N/A	N/A

== Teams ==
Season	Skip	Third	Second	Lead	Alternate
2011–12	Kelsey Rocque	Keely Brown	Taylor McDonald	Claire Tully	
2012–13	Kelsey Rocque	Keely Brown	Taylor McDonald	Claire Tully	
2013–14	Kelsey Rocque	Keely Brown	Taylor McDonald	Claire Tully	
2014–15	Kelsey Rocque	Danielle Schmiemann	Holly Jamieson	Jesse Iles	
2015–16	Kelsey Rocque	Laura Crocker	Taylor McDonald	Jen Gates	
2016–17	Kelsey Rocque	Laura Crocker	Taylor McDonald	Jen Gates	
2017–18	Kelsey Rocque	Laura Crocker	Taylor McDonald	Jen Gates	
2018–19	Kelsey Rocque	Danielle Schmiemann	Rebecca Konschuh	Jesse Iles	
2019–20	Kelsey Rocque	Danielle Schmiemann	Rebecca Hebert	Jesse Marlow	
2020–21	Kelsey Rocque	Danielle Schmiemann	Dana Ferguson	Rachelle Brown	
2021–22	Kelsey Rocque	Danielle Schmiemann	Dana Ferguson	Rachelle Brown	
2022–23	Kelsey Rocque	Danielle Schmiemann	Dana Ferguson	Rachelle Brown	
2023–24	Beth Peterson	Kelsey Rocque	Katherine Doerksen	Melissa Gordon-Kurz	Jenna Loder
2024–25	Beth Peterson	Kelsey Calvert	Katherine Remillard	Melissa Gordon-Kurz	Meghan Walter
2025–26	Beth Peterson	Kelsey Calvert	Katherine Remillard	Melissa Gordon-Kurz	
2025–26	Kelsey Calvert	Beth Peterson	Katherine Remillard	Melissa Gordon-Kurz	
2026–27	Kelsey Calvert	Beth Peterson	Katherine Remillard	Melissa Gordon-Kurz	
