= Keely Brown =

Canadian curler

Personal information
- Born: July 13, 1993 (age 32) Calgary, Alberta, Canada

Sport
- Sport: curling

Keely Brown (born July 13, 1993) is a Canadian curler and former World junior curling champion. She has also been on the gold medal team at the 2008 and 2010 Alberta Winter Games and the 2014 World Junior Curling Championships.

Brown started curling at the age of six at the North Hill Curling Club in Calgary. In 2004, she joined a team to begin her competitive career.

== Career highlights ==
- 2008: Gold Medal, Alberta Winter Games (Lead Keelin McKiernan, Second Christine Klyne, Third Danika Watt, Skip Keely Brown)
- 2010: Gold Medal, Alberta Winter Games (Lead Claire Tully, Second Taylor McDonald, Third Alexandra Nash-McLeod, Skip Keely Brown)
- 2011: Alberta Juvenile Provincial Championship, second place (Lead Claire Tully, Second Taylor McDonald, Third Alexandra Nash-McLeod, Skip Keely Brown)
- 2013: Alberta Junior Provincial Championship, runner up (Lead Claire Tully, Second Taylor McDonald, Third Keely Brown, Skip Kelsey Rocque)
- 2014: Alberta, Canadian and World Junior Curling Champions (Lead Claire Tully, Second Taylor McDonald, Third Keely Brown, Skip Kelsey Rocque)

== Post-career ==
Brown decided to postpone competitive curling after becoming too old for the junior circuit to concentrate on her nursing studies at the University of Alberta. She is due to complete her Nursing degree in December 2016.
