= 2021 Canadian Olympic Curling Trials =

- Host city: Saskatoon, Saskatchewan
- Arena: SaskTel Centre
- Dates: November 20–28
- Attendance: 107,144
- Men's winner: (Newfoundland and Labrador) Team Gushue
- Curling club: St. John's CC, St. John's
- Skip: Brad Gushue
- Third: Mark Nichols
- Second: Brett Gallant
- Lead: Geoff Walker
- Alternate: Jeff Thomas
- Coach: Jules Owchar
- Finalist: (Ontario) Brad Jacobs
- Women's winner: (Manitoba) Team Jones
- Curling club: St. Vital CC, Winnipeg
- Skip: Jennifer Jones
- Third: Kaitlyn Lawes
- Second: Jocelyn Peterman
- Lead: Dawn McEwen
- Alternate: Lisa Weagle
- Coach: Viktor Kjäll
- Finalist: (Manitoba) Tracy Fleury

The 2021 Canadian Olympic Curling Trials (branded as the 2021 Tim Hortons Curling Trials for sponsorship reasons) were held from November 20 to 28 at the SaskTel Centre in Saskatoon, Saskatchewan. The winners of the men's and women's events represented Canada at the 2022 Winter Olympics.

In the women's final, the Jennifer Jones rink from Winnipeg defeated Tracy Fleury's East St. Paul, Manitoba rink 6–5 in an extra end. The win sent Jones back to the Olympics for the first time since winning a gold medal at the 2014 Winter Olympics. Jones had a chance to win the game in the tenth end with an easy hit and stay to score two points, but her release was tight, and her rock ended up rolling too far, settling for one point, and tying the game 5–5. In the final end, with last rock advantage, Fleury had a chance to win on her final shot, playing a soft-weight hit on a Jones rock. However, her rock curled too much and hit a guard, giving up a point and the game to Jones. For Jones and leads Dawn McEwen and Lisa Weagle, the win led to their second trip to the Olympics (Weagle went to the 2018 Winter Olympics as a member of team Rachel Homan). Third Kaitlyn Lawes qualified for her third Olympics, after also playing in the 2018 Olympics in the mixed doubles curling event, where she won gold. For second Jocelyn Peterman, it was her first Olympics.

In the men's final, Newfoundland and Labrador's Brad Gushue rink defeated Sault Ste. Marie, Ontario's Brad Jacobs rink 4–3 to send Gushue back to the Olympics for the first time since he won a gold medal at the 2006 Winter Olympics. The game was a low scoring affair, with both teams either getting singles or blanks, until Gushue scored two points in the ninth end to take a 4–2 lead. In the tenth and final end, Jacobs had a chance to make a tough hit and stick to tie the game, but was wide and rolled out, settling for just one point, losing the game. Gushue and his third Mark Nichols qualified for their second trip to the Olympics after 2006, but it was the first time for their front end of Brett Gallant and Geoff Walker.

== Qualification process ==
Due to the COVID-19 pandemic in Canada, the qualification process had to be revised for the event as the 2020 Canada Cup was cancelled. Instead of the usual pool of teams that was designated as eligible to represent Canada at the Olympics, more qualification events were needed to allow the teams that made changes in the off-season to qualify. The winner of each trials will represent Canada at the 2022 Winter Olympics.

Nine teams qualified for the Olympic Trials based on the following criteria.

=== Men ===
Qualification method	Qualifying team	Scenario if team has already qualified
Winner of the 2019 Canada Cup	(Ontario) John Epping	None (first qualifier)
Winner of the 2020 Tim Hortons Brier	(Newfoundland and Labrador) Brad Gushue	(None)
Teams in the top three of CTRS in either 2018–19 or 2019–20	(Alberta) Brendan Bottcher	First place on 2018–19 CTRS
Teams in the top three of CTRS in either 2018–19 or 2019–20	(Alberta) Kevin Koe	Second place on 2018–19 CTRS
Teams in the top three of CTRS in either 2018–19 or 2019–20	(Ontario) Brad Jacobs	First place on 2019–20 CTRS
Winner of the 2021 Tim Hortons Brier	(Alberta) ~~Brendan Bottcher~~	Spot went to qualifier from the Trials Direct-Entry Event
Trials Direct-Entry Qualifier #1	(Manitoba) Mike McEwen	(None)
Trials Direct-Entry Qualifier #2	(Saskatchewan) Matt Dunstone	(None)
Pre-Trials Qualifier #1	(Manitoba) Jason Gunnlaugson	(None)
Pre-Trials Qualifier #2	(Ontario) Tanner Horgan	(None)

=== Women ===
Qualification method	Qualifying team	Scenario if team has already qualified
Winner of the 2019 Canada Cup	(Ontario) Rachel Homan	None (first qualifier)
Winner of the 2020 Scotties Tournament of Hearts	(Manitoba) Kerri Einarson	(None)
Teams in the top three of CTRS in either 2018–19 or 2019–20	(Manitoba) Jennifer Jones	First place on 2018–19 CTRS
Teams in the top three of CTRS in either 2018–19 or 2019–20	(Manitoba) Tracy Fleury	Second place on 2019–20 CTRS
Winner of the 2021 Scotties Tournament of Hearts	(Manitoba) ~~Kerri Einarson~~	Spot went to qualifier from the Trials Direct-Entry Event
Trials Direct-Entry Qualifier #1	(Alberta) Casey Scheidegger	(None)
Trials Direct-Entry Qualifier #2	(Alberta) Kelsey Rocque	(None)
Trials Direct-Entry Qualifier #3	(Alberta) Laura Walker	(None)
Pre-Trials Qualifier #1	(Ontario) Krista McCarville	(None)
Pre-Trials Qualifier #2	(Ontario) Jacqueline Harrison	(None)

== Men ==
=== Teams ===
Skip	Third	Second	Lead	Alternate	Club
Brendan Bottcher	Darren Moulding	Brad Thiessen	Karrick Martin	Pat Janssen	Saville Community SC, Edmonton, Alberta
Matt Dunstone	Colton Lott (Note: Lott replaced Braeden Moskowy, who could not play due to personal reasons.)	Kirk Muyres	Dustin Kidby		Highland CC, Regina, Saskatchewan
John Epping	Ryan Fry	Mat Camm	Brent Laing	Glenn Howard	Leaside CC, East York, Toronto, Ontario
Jason Gunnlaugson	Adam Casey	Matt Wozniak	Connor Njegovan		Morris CC, Morris, Manitoba
Brad Gushue	Mark Nichols	Brett Gallant	Geoff Walker	Jeff Thomas	RE/MAX Centre, St. John's, Newfoundland and Labrador
Tanner Horgan	Jonathan Beuk	Wesley Forget	Scott Chadwick	Jacob Horgan	Cataraqui G&CC, Kingston, Ontario
Brad Jacobs	Marc Kennedy	E. J. Harnden	Ryan Harnden		Community First CC, Sault Ste. Marie, Ontario
Kevin Koe	B. J. Neufeld	John Morris (vice)	Ben Hebert	Denni Neufeld	The Glencoe Club, Calgary, Alberta
Mike McEwen	Reid Carruthers	Derek Samagalski	Colin Hodgson	Kelly Knapp	West St. Paul CC, West St. Paul, Manitoba

=== Round robin standings ===
Final Round Robin Standings

Key
Teams to Playoffs
Teams to Tiebreakers

Team	W	L	PF	PA	EW	EL	BE	SE	S%	DSC
(Newfoundland and Labrador) Brad Gushue	7	1	59	35	39	24	11	13	89%	332.3
(Ontario) Brad Jacobs	7	1	63	35	33	27	6	8	92%	327.4
(Alberta) Kevin Koe	6	2	57	43	30	30	6	6	90%	396.3
(Manitoba) Mike McEwen	4	4	47	43	30	29	6	7	88%	351.2
(Saskatchewan) Matt Dunstone	3	5	47	54	29	31	5	5	87%	292.6
(Ontario) John Epping	3	5	47	58	28	33	4	3	85%	422.1
(Alberta) Brendan Bottcher	3	5	49	49	32	29	8	7	87%	524.0
(Manitoba) Jason Gunnlaugson	2	6	47	63	28	36	3	1	85%	434.8
(Ontario) Tanner Horgan	1	7	33	69	26	36	4	2	83%	712.8

=== Round robin results ===
All draw times are listed in Central Time (UTC−06:00).

==== Draw 2 ====
Saturday, November 20, 7:00 pm

Sheet A	1	2	3	4	5	6	7	8	9	10	Final
(Alberta) Brendan Bottcher	0	0	1	0	0	2	0	0	1	0	4
(Newfoundland and Labrador) Brad Gushue 🔨	0	1	0	1	0	0	0	1	0	3	6

Sheet B	1	2	3	4	5	6	7	8	9	10	Final
(Alberta) Kevin Koe	0	1	3	0	1	0	0	2	2	X	9
(Ontario) Tanner Horgan 🔨	0	0	0	1	0	1	0	0	0	X	2

Sheet C	1	2	3	4	5	6	7	8	9	10	Final
(Saskatchewan) Matt Dunstone 🔨	0	0	1	0	0	1	0	0	X	X	2
(Manitoba) Mike McEwen	1	0	0	1	1	0	3	1	X	X	7

Sheet D	1	2	3	4	5	6	7	8	9	10	Final
(Ontario) Brad Jacobs 🔨	0	0	0	2	0	4	0	3	X	X	9
(Ontario) John Epping	0	0	0	0	1	0	2	0	X	X	3

==== Draw 4 ====
Sunday, November 21, 2:00 pm

Sheet A	1	2	3	4	5	6	7	8	9	10	Final
(Ontario) John Epping 🔨	3	0	1	0	2	0	4	0	X	X	10
(Manitoba) Jason Gunnlaugson	0	1	0	1	0	1	0	2	X	X	5

Sheet B	1	2	3	4	5	6	7	8	9	10	Final
(Saskatchewan) Matt Dunstone 🔨	0	0	1	0	1	0	1	0	2	1	6
(Ontario) Brad Jacobs	0	1	0	2	0	2	0	2	0	0	7

Sheet C	1	2	3	4	5	6	7	8	9	10	Final
(Alberta) Kevin Koe 🔨	0	0	2	0	0	0	1	0	X	X	3
(Newfoundland and Labrador) Brad Gushue	1	1	0	1	1	1	0	2	X	X	7

Sheet D	1	2	3	4	5	6	7	8	9	10	11	Final
(Ontario) Tanner Horgan	0	1	0	1	0	0	1	0	0	2	1	6
(Alberta) Brendan Bottcher 🔨	1	0	2	0	0	1	0	1	0	0	0	5

==== Draw 6 ====
Monday, November 22, 2:00 pm

Sheet A	1	2	3	4	5	6	7	8	9	10	Final
(Alberta) Kevin Koe 🔨	0	2	0	0	4	0	2	2	X	X	10
(Saskatchewan) Matt Dunstone	0	0	2	0	0	1	0	0	X	X	3

Sheet B	1	2	3	4	5	6	7	8	9	10	Final
(Newfoundland and Labrador) Brad Gushue	0	1	0	2	1	0	2	0	1	1	8
(Ontario) John Epping 🔨	1	0	2	0	0	2	0	1	0	0	6

Sheet C	1	2	3	4	5	6	7	8	9	10	Final
(Ontario) Brad Jacobs	0	0	0	0	0	2	0	2	1	X	5
(Alberta) Brendan Bottcher 🔨	0	0	0	1	0	0	1	0	0	X	2

Sheet D	1	2	3	4	5	6	7	8	9	10	Final
(Manitoba) Mike McEwen 🔨	0	1	1	0	0	0	4	0	5	X	11
(Manitoba) Jason Gunnlaugson	0	0	0	1	0	0	0	1	0	X	2

==== Draw 8 ====
Tuesday, November 23, 2:00 pm

Sheet A	1	2	3	4	5	6	7	8	9	10	11	Final
(Newfoundland and Labrador) Brad Gushue 🔨	0	1	1	0	1	0	2	0	1	0	1	7
(Ontario) Brad Jacobs	0	0	0	1	0	2	0	1	0	2	0	6

Sheet B	1	2	3	4	5	6	7	8	9	10	Final
(Alberta) Brendan Bottcher 🔨	2	1	1	0	2	1	0	3	X	X	10
(Manitoba) Mike McEwen	0	0	0	1	0	0	1	0	X	X	2

Sheet C	1	2	3	4	5	6	7	8	9	10	Final
(Manitoba) Jason Gunnlaugson 🔨	1	0	1	0	4	0	3	0	2	X	11
(Ontario) Tanner Horgan	0	1	0	1	0	2	0	2	0	X	6

Sheet D	1	2	3	4	5	6	7	8	9	10	Final
(Ontario) John Epping 🔨	0	1	0	0	2	0	3	0	2	1	9
(Saskatchewan) Matt Dunstone	1	0	2	1	0	1	0	2	0	0	7

==== Draw 10 ====
Wednesday, November 24, 9:00 am

Sheet A	1	2	3	4	5	6	7	8	9	10	Final
(Ontario) Tanner Horgan 🔨	1	0	0	1	0	0	1	0	1	1	5
(Manitoba) Mike McEwen	0	0	1	0	3	1	0	1	0	0	6

Sheet B	1	2	3	4	5	6	7	8	9	10	Final
(Ontario) Brad Jacobs	0	2	0	1	0	1	0	2	1	X	7
(Manitoba) Jason Gunnlaugson 🔨	2	0	1	0	2	0	0	0	0	X	5

Sheet C	1	2	3	4	5	6	7	8	9	10	Final
(Newfoundland and Labrador) Brad Gushue 🔨	2	1	0	0	2	0	0	3	1	X	9
(Saskatchewan) Matt Dunstone	0	0	2	0	0	0	2	0	0	X	4

Sheet D	1	2	3	4	5	6	7	8	9	10	Final
(Alberta) Brendan Bottcher 🔨	0	1	0	2	0	3	0	0	1	0	7
(Alberta) Kevin Koe	0	0	2	0	3	0	0	3	0	1	9

==== Draw 12 ====
Wednesday, November 24, 7:00 pm

Sheet A	1	2	3	4	5	6	7	8	9	10	Final
(Saskatchewan) Matt Dunstone 🔨	0	3	0	0	3	0	1	0	2	X	9
(Alberta) Brendan Bottcher	0	0	0	1	0	2	0	1	0	X	4

Sheet B	1	2	3	4	5	6	7	8	9	10	Final
(Manitoba) Mike McEwen 🔨	0	2	0	1	0	1	0	1	1	0	6
(Alberta) Kevin Koe	0	0	2	0	2	0	2	0	0	1	7

Sheet C	1	2	3	4	5	6	7	8	9	10	Final
(Ontario) Tanner Horgan	0	1	0	0	0	1	0	2	X	X	4
(Ontario) John Epping 🔨	2	0	2	1	2	0	1	0	X	X	8

Sheet D	1	2	3	4	5	6	7	8	9	10	Final
(Manitoba) Jason Gunnlaugson 🔨	1	0	0	1	2	0	2	0	0	1	7
(Newfoundland and Labrador) Brad Gushue	0	1	1	0	0	2	0	0	2	0	6

==== Draw 14 ====
Thursday, November 25, 2:00 pm

Sheet A	1	2	3	4	5	6	7	8	9	10	Final
(Manitoba) Mike McEwen	0	0	0	1	0	0	0	3	2	X	6
(Ontario) John Epping 🔨	0	1	0	0	0	0	1	0	0	X	2

Sheet B	1	2	3	4	5	6	7	8	9	10	Final
(Ontario) Tanner Horgan	0	1	0	0	0	0	0	0	X	X	1
(Newfoundland and Labrador) Brad Gushue 🔨	2	0	0	0	2	2	3	1	X	X	10

Sheet C	1	2	3	4	5	6	7	8	9	10	Final
(Alberta) Brendan Bottcher	0	1	0	2	1	0	0	2	1	0	7
(Manitoba) Jason Gunnlaugson 🔨	0	0	2	0	0	2	0	0	0	2	6

Sheet D	1	2	3	4	5	6	7	8	9	10	Final
(Alberta) Kevin Koe	0	0	1	0	0	1	0	0	X	X	2
(Ontario) Brad Jacobs 🔨	0	2	0	1	1	0	3	1	X	X	8

==== Draw 16 ====
Friday, November 26, 9:00 am

Sheet A	1	2	3	4	5	6	7	8	9	10	Final
(Manitoba) Jason Gunnlaugson	0	0	2	0	2	0	1	0	2	0	7
(Alberta) Kevin Koe 🔨	0	1	0	2	0	2	0	1	0	2	8

Sheet B	1	2	3	4	5	6	7	8	9	10	Final
(Ontario) John Epping 🔨	1	0	2	0	0	1	0	2	0	X	6
(Alberta) Brendan Bottcher	0	1	0	1	3	0	2	0	3	X	10

Sheet C	1	2	3	4	5	6	7	8	9	10	Final
(Manitoba) Mike McEwen 🔨	2	0	1	0	0	1	0	1	0	X	5
(Ontario) Brad Jacobs	0	1	0	3	1	0	2	0	2	X	9

Sheet D	1	2	3	4	5	6	7	8	9	10	Final
(Saskatchewan) Matt Dunstone 🔨	2	0	0	2	0	0	2	0	2	X	8
(Ontario) Tanner Horgan	0	0	2	0	0	1	0	1	0	X	4

==== Draw 18 ====
Friday, November 26, 7:00 pm

Sheet A	1	2	3	4	5	6	7	8	9	10	Final
(Ontario) Brad Jacobs 🔨	0	3	0	4	0	3	2	0	X	X	12
(Ontario) Tanner Horgan	0	0	2	0	2	0	0	1	X	X	5

Sheet B	1	2	3	4	5	6	7	8	9	10	Final
(Manitoba) Jason Gunnlaugson	0	0	0	2	0	0	0	2	0	X	4
(Saskatchewan) Matt Dunstone 🔨	0	2	0	0	2	1	1	0	2	X	8

Sheet C	1	2	3	4	5	6	7	8	9	10	Final
(Ontario) John Epping	0	0	0	0	0	2	0	1	X	X	3
(Alberta) Kevin Koe 🔨	0	2	4	0	1	0	2	0	X	X	9

Sheet D	1	2	3	4	5	6	7	8	9	10	Final
(Newfoundland and Labrador) Brad Gushue 🔨	1	0	0	2	0	0	0	3	0	0	6
(Manitoba) Mike McEwen	0	1	0	0	1	0	0	0	2	0	4

=== Playoffs ===
Semifinal			Final
			1	(Newfoundland and Labrador) Brad Gushue	4
2	(Ontario) Brad Jacobs	8	2	(Ontario) Brad Jacobs	3
3	(Alberta) Kevin Koe	3

==== Semifinal ====
Saturday, November 27, 2:00 pm

Sheet C	1	2	3	4	5	6	7	8	9	10	Final
(Ontario) Brad Jacobs 🔨	0	0	4	0	4	0	X	X	X	X	8
(Alberta) Kevin Koe	0	0	0	1	0	2	X	X	X	X	3

Player percentages
(Ontario) Team Jacobs		(Alberta) Team Koe	
Ryan Harnden	98%	Ben Hebert	100%
E. J. Harnden	92%	John Morris	96%
Marc Kennedy	94%	B. J. Neufeld	92%
Brad Jacobs	92%	Kevin Koe	96%
Total	94%	Total	96%

==== Final ====
Sunday, November 28, 7:00 pm

Sheet C	1	2	3	4	5	6	7	8	9	10	Final
(Newfoundland and Labrador) Brad Gushue 🔨	0	1	0	1	0	0	0	0	2	0	4
(Ontario) Brad Jacobs	0	0	1	0	0	0	0	1	0	1	3

Player percentages
(Newfoundland and Labrador) Team Gushue		(Ontario) Team Jacobs	
Geoff Walker	96%	Ryan Harnden	83%
Brett Gallant	83%	E. J. Harnden	89%
Mark Nichols	93%	Marc Kennedy	76%
Brad Gushue	89%	Brad Jacobs	82%
Total	90%	Total	82%

=== Top 5 player percentages ===
Round Robin only

Leads	%
(Ontario) Ryan Harnden	94
(Saskatchewan) Dustin Kidby	92
(Alberta) Ben Hebert	92
(Alberta) Karrick Martin	92
(Manitoba) Colin Hodgson	92

Seconds	%
(Alberta) John Morris	91
(Newfoundland and Labrador) Brett Gallant	90
(Ontario) E. J. Harnden	89
(Ontario) Mat Camm	87
(Manitoba) Derek Samagalski	87

Thirds	%
(Ontario) Marc Kennedy	92
(Saskatchewan) Colton Lott	91
(Ontario) Ryan Fry	89
(Newfoundland and Labrador) Mark Nichols	89
(Alberta) B. J. Neufeld	88
(Manitoba) Reid Carruthers	88

Skips	%
(Ontario) Brad Jacobs	92
(Newfoundland and Labrador) Brad Gushue	89
(Alberta) Kevin Koe	88
(Manitoba) Mike McEwen	86
(Alberta) Brendan Bottcher	84

== Women ==
=== Teams ===
Skip	Third	Second	Lead	Alternate	Club
Kerri Einarson	Val Sweeting	Shannon Birchard	Briane Meilleur	Krysten Karwacki	Gimli CC, Gimli, Manitoba
Tracy Fleury	Selena Njegovan	Liz Fyfe	Kristin MacCuish	Chelsea Carey	East St. Paul CC, East St. Paul, Manitoba
Jacqueline Harrison	Allison Flaxey	Lynn Kreviazuk	Laura Hickey		Dundas Valley G&CC, Dundas, Ontario
Rachel Homan	Emma Miskew	Sarah Wilkes	Joanne Courtney		Ottawa CC, Ottawa, Ontario
Jennifer Jones	Kaitlyn Lawes	Jocelyn Peterman	Dawn McEwen	Lisa Weagle	St. Vital CC, Winnipeg, Manitoba
Krista McCarville	Kendra Lilly	Ashley Sippala	Sarah Potts		Fort William CC, Thunder Bay, Ontario
Kelsey Rocque	Danielle Schmiemann	Dana Ferguson	Rachelle Brown	Stefanie Lawton	Saville Community SC, Edmonton, Alberta
Casey Scheidegger	Cary-Anne McTaggart	Jessie Haughian	Kristie Moore	Susan O'Connor	Lethbridge CC, Lethbridge, Alberta
Laura Walker	Kate Cameron	Taylor McDonald	Nadine Scotland	Erin Pincott	Saville Community SC, Edmonton, Alberta

=== Round robin standings ===
Final Round Robin Standings

Key
Teams to Playoffs
Teams to Tiebreakers

Team	W	L	PF	PA	EW	EL	BE	SE	S%	DSC
(Manitoba) Tracy Fleury	8	0	69	37	44	26	2	17	84%	656.9
(Manitoba) Jennifer Jones	5	3	61	48	38	33	3	11	82%	423.0
(Ontario) Krista McCarville	4	4	45	52	32	35	7	5	83%	594.1
(Manitoba) Kerri Einarson	4	4	55	53	37	32	3	14	83%	788.6
(Alberta) Casey Scheidegger	4	4	44	53	31	33	4	7	82%	1136.1
(Alberta) Laura Walker	3	5	61	57	34	38	2	9	81%	774.9
(Alberta) Kelsey Rocque	3	5	49	56	32	38	3	7	83%	830.3
(Ontario) Jacqueline Harrison	3	5	46	60	31	40	3	4	76%	1096.5
(Ontario) Rachel Homan	2	6	46	60	32	36	5	7	81%	455.6

=== Round robin results ===
All draw times are listed in Central Time (UTC−06:00).

==== Draw 1 ====
Saturday, November 20, 2:00 pm

Sheet A	1	2	3	4	5	6	7	8	9	10	Final
(Ontario) Krista McCarville	0	2	0	1	0	1	0	1	0	X	5
(Manitoba) Jennifer Jones 🔨	2	0	1	0	2	0	1	0	2	X	8

Sheet B	1	2	3	4	5	6	7	8	9	10	Final
(Ontario) Jacqueline Harrison	0	2	0	1	0	0	1	0	0	2	6
(Ontario) Rachel Homan 🔨	1	0	1	0	0	1	0	1	1	0	5

Sheet C	1	2	3	4	5	6	7	8	9	10	Final
(Manitoba) Kerri Einarson 🔨	0	1	0	1	0	0	2	0	0	X	4
(Manitoba) Tracy Fleury	1	0	2	0	0	1	0	0	3	X	7

Sheet D	1	2	3	4	5	6	7	8	9	10	Final
(Alberta) Casey Scheidegger 🔨	0	0	0	1	2	0	2	0	1	0	6
(Alberta) Laura Walker	0	0	0	0	0	1	0	2	0	1	4

==== Draw 3 ====
Sunday, November 21, 9:00 am

Sheet A	1	2	3	4	5	6	7	8	9	10	Final
(Alberta) Laura Walker 🔨	2	1	0	3	2	0	1	0	X	X	9
(Alberta) Kelsey Rocque	0	0	1	0	0	1	0	1	X	X	3

Sheet B	1	2	3	4	5	6	7	8	9	10	Final
(Manitoba) Kerri Einarson 🔨	1	0	2	1	0	5	1	0	X	X	10
(Alberta) Casey Scheidegger	0	1	0	0	3	0	0	1	X	X	5

Sheet C	1	2	3	4	5	6	7	8	9	10	Final
(Ontario) Jacqueline Harrison 🔨	0	1	0	0	0	0	1	0	X	X	2
(Manitoba) Jennifer Jones	1	0	1	2	1	2	0	3	X	X	10

Sheet D	1	2	3	4	5	6	7	8	9	10	Final
(Ontario) Rachel Homan	1	0	1	0	1	0	2	0	0	0	5
(Ontario) Krista McCarville 🔨	0	2	0	3	0	1	0	0	1	2	9

==== Draw 5 ====
Sunday, November 21, 7:00 pm

Sheet A	1	2	3	4	5	6	7	8	9	10	Final
(Ontario) Jacqueline Harrison	0	0	0	1	0	2	0	0	2	2	7
(Manitoba) Kerri Einarson 🔨	0	2	1	0	1	0	1	1	0	0	6

Sheet B	1	2	3	4	5	6	7	8	9	10	11	Final
(Manitoba) Jennifer Jones 🔨	1	0	0	1	0	2	0	2	0	1	1	8
(Alberta) Laura Walker	0	2	1	0	1	0	1	0	2	0	0	7

Sheet C	1	2	3	4	5	6	7	8	9	10	Final
(Alberta) Casey Scheidegger	0	0	0	1	0	1	1	0	0	2	5
(Ontario) Krista McCarville 🔨	0	0	0	0	1	0	0	2	1	0	4

Sheet D	1	2	3	4	5	6	7	8	9	10	Final
(Manitoba) Tracy Fleury	1	1	0	2	0	2	0	1	0	1	8
(Alberta) Kelsey Rocque 🔨	0	0	1	0	1	0	1	0	3	0	6

==== Draw 7 ====
Monday, November 22, 7:00 pm

Sheet A	1	2	3	4	5	6	7	8	9	10	Final
(Manitoba) Jennifer Jones 🔨	2	0	0	2	0	0	0	2	0	1	7
(Alberta) Casey Scheidegger	0	1	1	0	1	0	0	0	2	0	5

Sheet B	1	2	3	4	5	6	7	8	9	10	Final
(Ontario) Krista McCarville	0	0	0	0	1	0	1	0	X	X	2
(Manitoba) Tracy Fleury 🔨	3	1	1	2	0	1	0	1	X	X	9

Sheet C	1	2	3	4	5	6	7	8	9	10	Final
(Alberta) Kelsey Rocque	0	2	0	0	1	0	2	1	0	X	6
(Ontario) Rachel Homan 🔨	2	0	2	1	0	2	0	0	2	X	9

Sheet D	1	2	3	4	5	6	7	8	9	10	Final
(Alberta) Laura Walker	0	1	0	0	2	0	2	0	0	0	5
(Manitoba) Kerri Einarson 🔨	1	0	1	1	0	2	0	1	1	2	9

==== Draw 9 ====
Tuesday, November 23, 7:00 pm

Sheet A	1	2	3	4	5	6	7	8	9	10	Final
(Ontario) Rachel Homan 🔨	2	0	0	1	0	0	0	0	0	X	3
(Manitoba) Tracy Fleury	0	1	0	0	2	1	0	3	1	X	8

Sheet B	1	2	3	4	5	6	7	8	9	10	Final
(Alberta) Casey Scheidegger	0	0	2	0	0	0	1	1	0	1	5
(Alberta) Kelsey Rocque 🔨	0	3	0	0	1	1	0	0	1	0	6

Sheet C	1	2	3	4	5	6	7	8	9	10	Final
(Manitoba) Jennifer Jones 🔨	0	0	0	3	0	2	0	3	1	0	9
(Manitoba) Kerri Einarson	2	2	2	0	2	0	0	0	0	2	10

Sheet D	1	2	3	4	5	6	7	8	9	10	Final
(Ontario) Krista McCarville 🔨	1	1	1	0	0	2	0	1	0	X	6
(Ontario) Jacqueline Harrison	0	0	0	1	0	0	2	0	1	X	4

==== Draw 11 ====
Wednesday, November 24, 2:00 pm

Sheet A	1	2	3	4	5	6	7	8	9	10	Final
(Manitoba) Kerri Einarson	0	0	1	0	2	0	1	1	0	0	5
(Ontario) Krista McCarville 🔨	0	3	0	1	0	1	0	0	0	1	6

Sheet B	1	2	3	4	5	6	7	8	9	10	11	Final
(Manitoba) Tracy Fleury 🔨	2	0	1	1	0	1	0	1	0	0	3	9
(Ontario) Jacqueline Harrison	0	2	0	0	1	0	2	0	0	1	0	6

Sheet C	1	2	3	4	5	6	7	8	9	10	Final
(Ontario) Rachel Homan 🔨	0	0	1	0	0	2	0	2	0	X	5
(Alberta) Laura Walker	0	2	0	2	3	0	3	0	1	X	11

Sheet D	1	2	3	4	5	6	7	8	9	10	Final
(Alberta) Kelsey Rocque 🔨	0	0	2	0	2	1	0	0	0	X	5
(Manitoba) Jennifer Jones	0	2	0	2	0	0	1	1	2	X	8

==== Draw 13 ====
Thursday, November 25, 9:00 am

Sheet A	1	2	3	4	5	6	7	8	9	10	Final
(Manitoba) Tracy Fleury 🔨	0	3	0	1	0	3	0	2	1	1	11
(Alberta) Laura Walker	1	0	2	0	2	0	2	0	0	0	7

Sheet B	1	2	3	4	5	6	7	8	9	10	Final
(Ontario) Rachel Homan	0	2	1	0	1	0	0	2	1	X	7
(Manitoba) Jennifer Jones 🔨	1	0	0	3	0	0	1	0	0	X	5

Sheet C	1	2	3	4	5	6	7	8	9	10	Final
(Ontario) Krista McCarville 🔨	1	0	2	0	1	1	0	2	0	1	8
(Alberta) Kelsey Rocque	0	1	0	1	0	0	2	0	3	0	7

Sheet D	1	2	3	4	5	6	7	8	9	10	Final
(Ontario) Jacqueline Harrison 🔨	0	1	0	0	2	0	2	0	1	0	6
(Alberta) Casey Scheidegger	0	0	1	1	0	2	0	2	0	1	7

==== Draw 15 ====
Thursday, November 25, 7:00 pm

Sheet A	1	2	3	4	5	6	7	8	9	10	Final
(Alberta) Kelsey Rocque	0	0	3	2	0	2	0	0	1	X	8
(Ontario) Jacqueline Harrison 🔨	0	2	0	0	1	0	1	1	0	X	5

Sheet B	1	2	3	4	5	6	7	8	9	10	Final
(Alberta) Laura Walker 🔨	0	1	0	2	2	2	0	2	0	X	9
(Ontario) Krista McCarville	0	0	3	0	0	0	1	0	1	X	5

Sheet C	1	2	3	4	5	6	7	8	9	10	Final
(Manitoba) Tracy Fleury 🔨	2	2	3	1	0	1	0	1	X	X	10
(Alberta) Casey Scheidegger	0	0	0	0	2	0	1	0	X	X	3

Sheet D	1	2	3	4	5	6	7	8	9	10	Final
(Manitoba) Kerri Einarson	0	1	1	1	0	0	2	2	0	0	7
(Ontario) Rachel Homan 🔨	1	0	0	0	0	2	0	0	2	1	6

==== Draw 17 ====
Friday, November 26, 2:00 pm

Sheet A	1	2	3	4	5	6	7	8	9	10	Final
(Alberta) Casey Scheidegger 🔨	0	0	4	0	1	1	0	1	0	1	8
(Ontario) Rachel Homan	0	2	0	1	0	0	1	0	2	0	6

Sheet B	1	2	3	4	5	6	7	8	9	10	Final
(Alberta) Kelsey Rocque	0	2	0	1	0	1	0	1	1	2	8
(Manitoba) Kerri Einarson 🔨	1	0	1	0	2	0	0	0	0	0	4

Sheet C	1	2	3	4	5	6	7	8	9	10	11	Final
(Alberta) Laura Walker	0	0	4	0	2	0	0	0	2	1	0	9
(Ontario) Jacqueline Harrison 🔨	1	0	0	5	0	1	1	1	0	0	1	10

Sheet D	1	2	3	4	5	6	7	8	9	10	Final
(Manitoba) Jennifer Jones 🔨	1	0	0	0	1	1	0	1	0	2	6
(Manitoba) Tracy Fleury	0	1	1	2	0	0	2	0	1	0	7

=== Tiebreakers ===
==== Tiebreaker 1 ====
Saturday, November 27, 9:00 am

Sheet C	1	2	3	4	5	6	7	8	9	10	Final
(Manitoba) Kerri Einarson	0	0	4	0	0	0	0	1	0	3	8
(Alberta) Casey Scheidegger 🔨	1	0	0	1	0	1	0	0	3	0	6

Player percentages
(Manitoba) Team Einarson		(Alberta) Team Scheidegger	
Briane Meilleur	79%	Kristie Moore	85%
Shannon Birchard	76%	Jessie Haughian	80%
Val Sweeting	80%	Cary-Anne McTaggart	69%
Kerri Einarson	90%	Casey Scheidegger	79%
Total	81%	Total	78%

==== Tiebreaker 2 ====
Saturday, November 27, 2:00 pm

Sheet B	1	2	3	4	5	6	7	8	9	10	11	Final
(Ontario) Krista McCarville 🔨	0	0	0	0	1	0	0	2	0	0	1	4
(Manitoba) Kerri Einarson	0	0	0	0	0	2	0	0	0	1	0	3

Player percentages
(Ontario) Team McCarville		(Manitoba) Team Einarson	
Sarah Potts	82%	Briane Meilleur	91%
Ashley Sippala	78%	Shannon Birchard	78%
Kendra Lilly	86%	Val Sweeting	84%
Krista McCarville	82%	Kerri Einarson	82%
Total	82%	Total	84%

=== Playoffs ===
Semifinal			Final
			1	(Manitoba) Tracy Fleury	5
2	(Manitoba) Jennifer Jones	8	2	(Manitoba) Jennifer Jones	6
3	(Ontario) Krista McCarville	3

==== Semifinal ====
Saturday, November 27, 7:00 pm

Sheet C	1	2	3	4	5	6	7	8	9	10	Final
(Manitoba) Jennifer Jones 🔨	1	0	0	1	2	0	0	2	2	X	8
(Ontario) Krista McCarville	0	0	1	0	0	2	0	0	0	X	3

Player percentages
(Manitoba) Team Jones		(Ontario) Team McCarville	
Dawn McEwen	99%	Sarah Potts	91%
Jocelyn Peterman	87%	Ashley Sippala	83%
Kaitlyn Lawes	83%	Kendra Lilly	63%
Jennifer Jones	82%	Krista McCarville	68%
Total	88%	Total	77%

==== Final ====
Sunday, November 28, 2:00 pm

Sheet C	1	2	3	4	5	6	7	8	9	10	11	Final
(Manitoba) Tracy Fleury 🔨	0	1	0	2	0	0	1	0	1	0	0	5
(Manitoba) Jennifer Jones	1	0	2	0	0	1	0	0	0	1	1	6

Player percentages
(Manitoba) Team Fleury		(Manitoba) Team Jones	
Kristin MacCuish	92%	Dawn McEwen	92%
Liz Fyfe	78%	Jocelyn Peterman	85%
Selena Njegovan	70%	Kaitlyn Lawes	82%
Tracy Fleury	72%	Jennifer Jones	81%
Total	78%	Total	85%

=== Top 5 player percentages ===
Round Robin only

Leads	%
(Manitoba) Dawn McEwen	90
(Ontario) Joanne Courtney	90
(Alberta) Kristie Moore	87
(Alberta) Rachelle Brown	87
(Alberta) Nadine Scotland	86
(Ontario) Sarah Potts	86

Seconds	%
(Ontario) Ashley Sippala	88
(Manitoba) Liz Fyfe	85
(Manitoba) Shannon Birchard	85
(Alberta) Jessie Haughian	84
(Manitoba) Jocelyn Peterman	82

Thirds	%
(Manitoba) Val Sweeting	84
(Alberta) Danielle Schmiemann	83
(Manitoba) Selena Njegovan	82
(Manitoba) Kaitlyn Lawes	82
(Alberta) Kate Cameron	80

Skips	%
(Manitoba) Tracy Fleury	87
(Alberta) Kelsey Rocque	80
(Manitoba) Kerri Einarson	80
(Ontario) Krista McCarville	79
(Alberta) Laura Walker	78

== Qualification events ==
=== Trials Direct-Entry Event ===
The Trials Direct-Entry Event took place from September 22 to 26, 2021 at the RA Centre in Ottawa, Ontario. To qualify for the event, teams had to fall under one of these three categories:

- Canadian teams in the top 18 of the World Curling Team Ranking as of August 31, 2020,
- Eligible teams that finished in the top 9 of the Canadian Team Ranking System in 2019–20,
- Eligible teams that finished in the top 7 of the Canadian Team Ranking System in 2018–19.

The teams that didn't qualify for the trials via this event had a second chance to make the trials through the Pre-Trials.

For the men's tournament, there were 2 spots available in the trials for direct-entry. For the women's tournament, there were 3 spots available.

==== Men ====
===== Teams =====
The teams are listed as follows:

Skip	Third	Second	Lead	Club
Matt Dunstone	Braeden Moskowy	Kirk Muyres	Dustin Kidby	Highland CC, Regina, Saskatchewan
Colton Flasch	Catlin Schneider	Kevin Marsh	Dan Marsh	Nutana CC, Saskatoon, Saskatchewan
Jason Gunnlaugson	Adam Casey	Matt Wozniak	Connor Njegovan	Morris CC, Morris, Manitoba
Glenn Howard	Scott Howard	David Mathers	Tim March	Penetanguishene CC, Penetanguishene, Ontario
Mike McEwen	Reid Carruthers	Derek Samagalski	Colin Hodgson	West St. Paul CC, West St. Paul, Manitoba

===== Round robin standings =====
Final round robin standings

Team	W	L	PF	PA	EW	EL	BE	SE
(Manitoba) Mike McEwen	3	1	25	17	15	13	3	5
(Saskatchewan) Matt Dunstone	3	1	28	21	18	14	3	7
(Ontario) Glenn Howard	2	2	18	27	12	14	4	5
(Saskatchewan) Colton Flasch	1	3	20	21	12	13	2	4
(Manitoba) Jason Gunnlaugson	1	3	21	26	15	18	2	4

===== Qualifying round standings =====
Final Qualifying Round standings
Note: one game (Flasch vs. Howard) was not played as Dunstone and McEwen had already qualified.

Key
Teams to Trials

Team	W	L	PF	PA	EW	EL	BE	SE
(Manitoba) Mike McEwen	5	1	43	29	25	20	4	8
(Saskatchewan) Matt Dunstone	5	1	42	32	29	21	5	10
(Ontario) Glenn Howard	2	3	24	35	16	20	4	5
(Saskatchewan) Colton Flasch	1	4	24	30	14	19	3	4
(Manitoba) Jason Gunnlaugson	1	5	34	41	23	27	4	5

==== Women ====
===== Teams =====
The teams are listed as follows:

Skip	Third	Second	Lead	Alternate	Club
Suzanne Birt	Marie Christianson	Meaghan Hughes	Michelle McQuaid		Cornwall CC, Cornwall & Montague CC, Montague, Prince Edward Island
Corryn Brown	Erin Pincott	Dezaray Hawes	Samantha Fisher		Kamloops CC, Kamloops, British Columbia
Kelsey Rocque	Danielle Schmiemann	Dana Ferguson	Rachelle Brown		Saville Community SC, Edmonton, Alberta
Casey Scheidegger	Cary-Anne McTaggart	Jessie Haughian	Kristie Moore		Lethbridge CC, Lethbridge, Alberta
Laura Walker	Kate Cameron	Taylor McDonald	Heather Rogers (Note: Heather Rogers played lead during the tournament, replacing Nadine Scotland who was on maternity leave. Scotland was still listed as the teams alternate on the roster, however.)	Nadine Scotland	Saville Community SC, Edmonton, Alberta

===== Round robin standings =====
Final round robin standings

Key
Teams to Trials
Teams to Playoff

Team	W	L	PF	PA	EW	EL	BE	SE
(Alberta) Casey Scheidegger	3	1	29	21	17	14	0	6
(Alberta) Kelsey Rocque	3	1	27	25	18	17	3	1
(Alberta) Laura Walker	2	2	28	25	17	15	3	3
(British Columbia) Corryn Brown	1	3	24	30	14	19	3	2
(Prince Edward Island) Suzanne Birt	1	3	22	29	15	16	1	5

===== Playoff =====
- Team Walker had to be beaten twice.

Game 1			Game 2
			1	(Alberta) Laura Walker	8
1	(Alberta) Laura Walker	8	2	(British Columbia) Corryn Brown	4
2	(British Columbia) Corryn Brown	9

=== Pre-Trials Direct-Entry Event ===
The Canadian Curling Pre-Trials Direct-Entry Event was held concurrently with the Trials Direct-Entry event September 22 to 26 at the RA Centre in Ottawa. Eight teams of each gender competed for two berths each at the Pre-Trials in Liverpool.

==== Men ====
===== Teams =====
The teams are listed as follows:

Skip	Third	Second	Lead	Alternate	Locale
Corey Chambers	Julien Leduc	Devon Wiebe	Stuart Shiells		Winnipeg, Manitoba
Jacques Gauthier	Jordan Peters	Brayden Payette	Cole Chandler		Winnipeg, Manitoba
Sean Grassie	Tyler Drews	Daryl Evans	Rodney Legault		Winnipeg, Manitoba
William Lyburn	Daley Peters	Kennedy Bird	Bryce McEwen		Winnipeg, Manitoba
Shaun Meachem	Brady Scharback	Tyler Hartung (Note: Tyler Hartung spared for Brayden Stewart.)	Jared Latos	Jeff Chambers	Saskatoon, Saskatchewan
Vincent Roberge	Jean-Michel Arsenault	Jesse Mullen	Julien Tremblay		Saint-Romuald, Quebec
JT Ryan	Colin Kurz	Joey Hart	Brendan Bilawka		Winnipeg, Manitoba
Ryan Wiebe	Sean Flatt	Zack Bilawka	Adam Flatt		Winnipeg, Manitoba

===== Knockout brackets =====
====== A Event ======
First Knockout	Qualifier 1
1	(Manitoba) Corey Chambers	7
8	(Manitoba) William Lyburn	5
1	(Manitoba) Corey Chambers	7
5	(Manitoba) JT Ryan	1
4	(Manitoba) Sean Grassie	3
5	(Manitoba) JT Ryan	4
1	(Manitoba) Corey Chambers	4
3	(Quebec) Vincent Roberge	7
2	(Manitoba) Jacques Gauthier	7
7	(Saskatchewan) Shaun Meachem	9
7	(Saskatchewan) Shaun Meachem	3
3	(Quebec) Vincent Roberge	7
3	(Quebec) Vincent Roberge	9
6	(Manitoba) Ryan Wiebe	6

====== B Event ======
Second Knockout	Qualifier 2
7	(Saskatchewan) Shaun Meachem	9
(Manitoba) William Lyburn	6	8	(Manitoba) William Lyburn	2
(Manitoba) Sean Grassie	4	7	(Saskatchewan) Shaun Meachem	5
(Manitoba) Jacques Gauthier	8	5	(Manitoba) JT Ryan	7
(Manitoba) Ryan Wiebe	6	2	(Manitoba) Jacques Gauthier	7
5	(Manitoba) JT Ryan	8
5	(Manitoba) JT Ryan	6
1	(Manitoba) Corey Chambers	2

====== C Event ======
Third Knockout									Qualifier 3
									1	(Manitoba) Corey Chambers	5
4	(Manitoba) Sean Grassie	7							4	(Manitoba) Sean Grassie	6
2	(Manitoba) Jacques Gauthier	3	4	(Manitoba) Sean Grassie	7
6	(Manitoba) Ryan Wiebe	9	6	(Manitoba) Ryan Wiebe	6
8	(Manitoba) William Lyburn	5				4	(Manitoba) Sean Grassie	7
						7	(Saskatchewan) Shaun Meachem	5

===== Playoffs =====
A vs. B
A	(Quebec) Vincent Roberge	5
B	(Manitoba) JT Ryan	4

Second place game
B	(Manitoba) JT Ryan	6
C	(Manitoba) Sean Grassie	7

Qualify for Pre-Trials
(Quebec) Vincent Roberge
(Manitoba) Sean Grassie

==== Women ====
===== Teams =====
The teams are listed as follows:

Skip	Third	Second	Lead	Alternate	Locale
Jill Brothers	Erin Carmody	Kim Kelly (Note: As second Sarah Murphy did not attend the event, alternate Kim Kelly moved up to play second. Murphy was still listed as the teams alternate on the roster, however.)	Jenn Mitchell	Sarah Murphy	Halifax, Nova Scotia
Jo-Ann Rizzo (Fourth)	Sarah Koltun	Margot Flemming	Kerry Galusha (Skip)	Shona Barbour	Yellowknife, Northwest Territories
Ashley Howard	Kourtney Fesser	Krista Fesser	Kaylin Skinner		Saskatoon, Saskatchewan
Kaitlyn Jones	Robyn Njegovan	Abby Ackland	Sara Oliver	Vanessa Foster	Winnipeg, Manitoba
Lauren Mann	Kira Brunton	Cheryl Kreviazuk	Karen Trines	Marcia Richardson	Ottawa, Ontario
Jessie Hunkin (Note: As skip Robyn Silvernagle was on maternity leave, second Jessie Hunkin moved up to skip and alternate Becca Hebert played second. Silvernagle was listed as the alternate on the roster, however.)	Kristen Streifel	Becca Hebert	Dayna Demers	Robyn Silvernagle	North Battleford, Saskatchewan
Laurie St-Georges	Hailey Armstrong	Emily Riley	Cynthia St-Georges	Isabelle Thiboutot	Laval, Quebec
Sarah Wark	Kristen Pilote	Nicky Kaufman	Oye-Sem Won (Note: Alternate Oye-Sem Won played lead during the tournament, replacing Karla Thompson.)	Karla Thompson	Abbotsford, British Columbia

===== Knockout brackets =====
====== A Event ======
First Knockout	Qualifier 1
1	(Manitoba) Kaitlyn Jones	4
8	(Saskatchewan) Ashley Howard	8
8	(Saskatchewan) Ashley Howard	4
4	(Northwest Territories) Kerry Galusha	9
4	(Northwest Territories) Kerry Galusha	10
5	(British Columbia) Sarah Wark	4
4	(Northwest Territories) Kerry Galusha	6
3	(Saskatchewan) Team Silvernagle	5
2	(Quebec) Laurie St-Georges	8
7	(Nova Scotia) Jill Brothers	4
2	(Quebec) Laurie St-Georges	2
3	(Saskatchewan) Team Silvernagle	11
3	(Saskatchewan) Team Silvernagle	12
6	(Ontario) Lauren Mann	2

====== B Event ======
Second Knockout	Qualifier 2
3	(Saskatchewan) Team Silvernagle	11
1	(Manitoba) Kaitlyn Jones	3
2	(Quebec) Laurie St-Georges	5
1	(Manitoba) Kaitlyn Jones	11	1	(Manitoba) Kaitlyn Jones	6
5	(British Columbia) Sarah Wark	3	1	(Manitoba) Kaitlyn Jones	8
6	(Ontario) Lauren Mann	6
8	(Saskatchewan) Ashley Howard	5
7	(Nova Scotia) Jill Brothers	6	6	(Ontario) Lauren Mann	7
6	(Ontario) Lauren Mann	8

====== C Event ======
Third Knockout									Qualifier 3
									1	(Manitoba) Kaitlyn Jones	4
5	(British Columbia) Sarah Wark	7							7	(Nova Scotia) Jill Brothers	10
8	(Saskatchewan) Ashley Howard	9	8	(Saskatchewan) Ashley Howard	4
7	(Nova Scotia) Jill Brothers	8	7	(Nova Scotia) Jill Brothers	7
2	(Quebec) Laurie St-Georges	5				7	(Nova Scotia) Jill Brothers	10
						6	(Ontario) Lauren Mann	6

===== Playoffs =====
A vs. B
A	(Northwest Territories) Kerry Galusha	10
B	(Saskatchewan) Team Silvernagle	8

Second place game
B	(Saskatchewan) Team Silvernagle	6
C	(Nova Scotia) Jill Brothers	8

Final
(Northwest Territories) Kerry Galusha
(Nova Scotia) Jill Brothers

=== Pre-Trials ===
The Home Hardware Pre-Trials will be held October 26 to 31 at the Queens Place Emera Centre in Liverpool, Nova Scotia.

==== Men ====
===== Teams =====
The teams are listed as follows:

Skip	Third	Second	Lead	Alternate	Club
Braden Calvert	Kyle Kurz	Ian McMillan	Rob Gordon		Assiniboine Memorial CC, Winnipeg, Manitoba
Pat Ferris	Ian Dickie	Connor Duhaime	Zack Shurtleff		Grimsby CC, Grimsby, Ontario
Colton Flasch	Catlin Schneider	Kevin Marsh	Dan Marsh		Nutana CC, Saskatoon, Saskatchewan
Paul Flemming	Scott Saccary	Ryan Abraham	Phil Crowell		Halifax CC, Halifax, Nova Scotia
Félix Asselin (Fourth)	Martin Crête	Mike Fournier (Skip)	Jean-François Trépanier		Glenmore CC, Montreal, Quebec
Sean Grassie	Tyler Drews	Daryl Evans	Rodney Legault	Nick Drews	Deer Lodge CC, Winnipeg, Manitoba
Jason Gunnlaugson	Adam Casey	Matt Wozniak	Connor Njegovan		Morris CC, Morris, Manitoba
Jeremy Harty	Kyler Kleibrink	Joshua Kiist	Kurtis Goller		The Glencoe Club, Calgary, Alberta
Tanner Horgan	Jonathan Beuk	Wesley Forget	Scott Chadwick	Jacob Horgan	Cataraqui G&CC, Kingston, Ontario
Glenn Howard	Scott Howard	David Mathers	Tim March		Penetanguishene CC, Penetanguishene, Ontario
Vincent Roberge	Jean-Michel Arsenault	Jesse Mullen	Julien Tremblay	François Roberge	Curling Etchemin, Saint-Romuald, Quebec
Pat Simmons	Colton Lott	Kyle Doering	Tanner Lott	Emerson Klimpke	Winnipeg Beach CR, Winnipeg, Manitoba
Karsten Sturmay	Tristan Steinke	Chris Kennedy	Glenn Venance		Saville Community SC, Edmonton, Alberta
Tyler Tardi	Sterling Middleton	Jason Ginter	Jordan Tardi		Langley CC, Langley, British Columbia

===== Round robin standings =====
Final round robin standings

Key
Teams to Playoffs

Pool A	W	L	DSC
(Ontario) Tanner Horgan	6	0	452.0
(Manitoba) Jason Gunnlaugson	4	2	407.0
(Manitoba) Pat Simmons	4	2	439.5
(Quebec) Mike Fournier	3	3	340.5
(Quebec) Vincent Roberge	2	4	388.10
(Alberta) Karsten Sturmay	2	4	382.5
(Alberta) Jeremy Harty	0	6	524.8

Pool B	W	L	DSC
(Ontario) Glenn Howard	5	1	170.0
(Nova Scotia) Paul Flemming	4	2	383.3
(British Columbia) Tyler Tardi	4	2	329.7
(Saskatchewan) Colton Flasch	4	2	305.4
(Manitoba) Braden Calvert	2	4	502.0
(Ontario) Pat Ferris	2	4	619.3
(Manitoba) Sean Grassie	0	6	815.8

===== Playoffs =====
A Semifinals			A Final
A1	(Ontario) Tanner Horgan	6
B2	(Nova Scotia) Paul Flemming	5	A1	(Ontario) Tanner Horgan	8
B1	(Ontario) Glenn Howard	6	A2	(Manitoba) Jason Gunnlaugson	9
A2	(Manitoba) Jason Gunnlaugson	8

B Quarterfinals			B Semifinal			B Final
A3	(Manitoba) Pat Simmons	9
B2	(Nova Scotia) Paul Flemming	4	A3	(Manitoba) Pat Simmons	2
B3	(British Columbia) Tyler Tardi	4	B1	(Ontario) Glenn Howard	9
B1	(Ontario) Glenn Howard	6				B1	(Ontario) Glenn Howard	4
						A1	(Ontario) Tanner Horgan	7

==== Women ====
===== Teams =====
The teams are listed as follows:

Skip	Third	Second	Lead	Alternate	Club
Sherry Anderson	Nancy Martin	Chaelynn Kitz	Breanne Knapp		Martensville CC, Saskatoon, Saskatchewan
Penny Barker	Christie Gamble	Jenna Enge	Danielle Sicinski		Moose Jaw Ford CC, Moose Jaw, Saskatchewan
Suzanne Birt	Marie Christianson	Meaghan Hughes	Michelle McQuaid		Cornwall CC, Cornwall & Montague CC, Montague, Prince Edward Island
Jill Brothers	Erin Carmody	Sarah Murphy	Jenn Mitchell	Kim Kelly	Halifax CC, Halifax, Nova Scotia
Corryn Brown	Erin Pincott	Dezaray Hawes	Samantha Fisher		Kamloops CC, Kamloops, British Columbia
Hollie Duncan	Megan Balsdon	Rachelle Strybosch	Tess Bobbie	Julie Tippin	Woodstock CC, Woodstock, Ontario
Jo-Ann Rizzo (Fourth)	Sarah Koltun	Margot Flemming	Kerry Galusha (Skip)	Shona Barbour	Yellowknife CC, Yellowknife, Northwest Territories
Jacqueline Harrison	Allison Flaxey	Lynn Kreviazuk	Laura Hickey	Kelly Middaugh	Dundas Valley G&CC, Dundas, Ontario
Danielle Inglis	Jessica Corrado	Stephanie Corrado	Cassandra de Groot		Dixie CC, Mississauga, Ontario
Krista McCarville	Kendra Lilly	Ashley Sippala	Sarah Potts		Fort William CC, Thunder Bay, Ontario
Jestyn Murphy	Carly Howard	Stephanie Matheson	Grace Holyoke	Janet Murphy	Mississaugua G&CC, Mississauga, Ontario
Beth Peterson	Jenna Loder	Katherine Doerksen	Melissa Gordon	Meghan Walter	Assiniboine Memorial CC, Winnipeg, Manitoba
Darcy Robertson	Laura Burtnyk	Gaetanne Gauthier	Krysten Karwacki		Assiniboine Memorial CC, Winnipeg, Manitoba
Mackenzie Zacharias	Karlee Burgess	Emily Zacharias	Lauren Lenentine		Altona CC, Altona, Manitoba

===== Round robin standings =====
Final round robin standings

Key
Teams to Playoffs

Pool A	W	L	DSC
(Ontario) Krista McCarville	5	1	311.1
(Ontario) Jacqueline Harrison	5	1	743.4
(British Columbia) Corryn Brown	4	2	630.2
(Saskatchewan) Penny Barker	3	3	894.0
(Ontario) Jestyn Murphy	2	4	330.4
(Manitoba) Beth Peterson	1	5	381.1
(Northwest Territories) Kerry Galusha	1	5	351.6

Pool B	W	L	DSC
(Prince Edward Island) Suzanne Birt	4	2	310.8
(Manitoba) Mackenzie Zacharias	4	2	420.2
(Saskatchewan) Sherry Anderson	4	2	499.7
(Manitoba) Darcy Robertson	3	3	410.2
(Ontario) Hollie Duncan	3	3	814.2
(Ontario) Danielle Inglis	2	4	538.5
(Nova Scotia) Jill Brothers	1	5	381.1

===== Playoffs =====
A Semifinals			A Final
A1	(Ontario) Krista McCarville	8
B2	(Manitoba) Mackenzie Zacharias	7	A1	(Ontario) Krista McCarville	9
B1	(Prince Edward Island) Suzanne Birt	4	A2	(Ontario) Jacqueline Harrison	6
A2	(Ontario) Jacqueline Harrison	8

B Quarterfinals			B Semifinal			B Final
A3	(British Columbia) Corryn Brown	10
B2	(Manitoba) Mackenzie Zacharias	3	A3	(British Columbia) Corryn Brown	8
B3	(Saskatchewan) Sherry Anderson	8	B3	(Saskatchewan) Sherry Anderson	5
B1	(Prince Edward Island) Suzanne Birt	6				A3	(British Columbia) Corryn Brown	2
						A2	(Ontario) Jacqueline Harrison	9
