= 2016 CCT Uiseong Masters =

World Curling Tour event

- Host city: Uiseong, South Korea
- Arena: Uiseong Curling Club
- Dates: March 8–11
- Winner: (Canada) Team Rocque
- Curling club: Saville Community SC, Edmonton, Alberta
- Skip: Kelsey Rocque
- Third: Laura Crocker
- Second: Taylor McDonald
- Lead: Jen Gates
- Finalist: (Switzerland) Silvana Tirinzoni

The 2016 CCT Uiseong Masters was held from March 8 to 11 at the Uiseong Curling Club in Uiseong-eup, Uiseong County, South Korea as part of the World Curling Tour. The event was held in a round robin format with a total purse of ₩ 200,000,000.

In the final, Kelsey Rocque and her team out of the Saville Community Sports Centre in Edmonton, Alberta, Canada defeated the Swiss rink of Silvana Tirinzoni from Aarau 5–1, thanks to a steal of three in the seventh end. It was Rocque's second tour win of the 2015–16 season, having won the Red Deer Curling Classic in October 2015. In the third place game, Allison Flaxey and her team from Caledon, Ontario, Canada defeated the Korean team of Kim Eun-jung from Uiseong 9–7. To reach the final, Rocque defeated Flaxey 4–2 in one semifinal and Tirinzoni upended Kim 7–5 in the other. Teams Val Sweeting, Michelle Englot, Nina Roth and Ayumi Ogasawara all reached the quarterfinals.

== Teams ==
The teams are listed as follows:

Skip	Third	Second	Lead	Alternate	Locale
Michelle Englot	Kate Cameron	Leslie Wilson-Westcott	Raunora Westcott		Winnipeg, Manitoba, Canada
Allison Flaxey	Clancy Grandy	Megan Balsdon	Morgan Court		Caledon, Ontario, Canada
Kim Eun-jung	Kim Kyeong-ae	Kim Seon-yeong	Kim Yeong-mi	Kim Cho-hi	Uiseong, South Korea
Kim Ji-suk	Kang Yoo-ri	Chung Jae-yi	Hyoung Bo-ram		Jeonbuk, South Korea
Ayumi Ogasawara	Sayaka Yoshimura	Kaho Onodera	Anna Ohmiya	Yumie Funayama	Sapporo, Japan
Kelsey Rocque	Laura Crocker	Taylor McDonald	Jen Gates		Edmonton, Alberta, Canada
Nina Roth	Aileen Sormunen	Monica Walker	Vicky Persinger		Blaine, Minnesota, United States
Ryu Young-ju	Kim Su-hyeon	Yeo Eun-byeol	Choi Su-yeon		Uiseong, South Korea
Val Sweeting	Lori Olson-Johns	Dana Ferguson	Rachelle Brown		Edmonton, Alberta, Canada
Silvana Tirinzoni	Manuela Siegrist	Esther Neuenschwander	Marlene Albrecht		Aarau, Switzerland

== Round-robin standings ==
Final round-robin standings

Key
Teams to Playoffs

Pool A	W	L	PF	PA	DSC
(Canada) Val Sweeting	3	1	20	18	143.1
(South Korea) Kim Eun-jung	3	1	26	16	186.5
(United States) Nina Roth	3	1	17	15	189.8
(Canada) Michelle Englot	1	3	17	22	331.2
(South Korea) Ryu Young-ju	0	4	12	21	277.5

Pool B	W	L	PF	PA	DSC
(Switzerland) Silvana Tirinzoni	4	0	27	13	284.0
(Canada) Kelsey Rocque	3	1	23	18	208.8
(Japan) Ayumi Ogasawara	2	2	25	24	294.1
(Canada) Allison Flaxey	1	3	19	21	322.2
(South Korea) Kim Ji-suk	0	4	12	30	357.6

== Round-robin results ==
All draw times are listed in Korean Standard Time (UTC+09:00).

=== Draw 1 ===
Tuesday, March 8, 9:00 am

Sheet 1	1	2	3	4	5	6	7	8	9	Final
(Canada) Michelle Englot	0	0	0	1	0	0	0	1	0	2
(United States) Nina Roth 🔨	0	1	0	0	0	1	0	0	1	3

Sheet 2	1	2	3	4	5	6	7	8	Final
(South Korea) Kim Eun-jung 🔨	0	0	2	1	1	1	0	X	5
(South Korea) Ryu Young-ju	0	0	0	0	0	0	1	X	1

Sheet 3	1	2	3	4	5	6	7	8	Final
(Canada) Kelsey Rocque	1	2	0	2	1	0	0	X	6
(South Korea) Kim Ji-suk 🔨	0	0	2	0	0	0	1	X	3

=== Draw 2 ===
Tuesday, March 8, 2:00 pm

Sheet 1	1	2	3	4	5	6	7	8	9	Final
(Japan) Ayumi Ogasawara 🔨	2	0	2	0	0	1	1	0	1	7
(Canada) Allison Flaxey	0	2	0	2	0	0	0	2	0	6

Sheet 2	1	2	3	4	5	6	7	8	Final
(Canada) Val Sweeting	0	1	0	1	1	0	0	0	3
(United States) Nina Roth 🔨	1	0	1	0	0	1	0	2	5

Sheet 3	1	2	3	4	5	6	7	8	Final
(Canada) Michelle Englot	0	2	0	0	2	0	0	X	4
(South Korea) Kim Eun-jung 🔨	2	0	2	1	0	1	2	X	8

=== Draw 3 ===
Tuesday, March 8, 7:00 pm

Sheet 1	1	2	3	4	5	6	7	8	Final
(Canada) Val Sweeting 🔨	0	1	2	0	0	2	0	X	5
(South Korea) Ryu Young-ju	0	0	0	1	1	0	2	X	4

Sheet 2	1	2	3	4	5	6	7	8	Final
(Canada) Kelsey Rocque 🔨	2	0	2	0	0	3	1	X	8
(Japan) Ayumi Ogasawara	0	3	0	2	0	0	0	X	5

Sheet 3	1	2	3	4	5	6	7	8	Final
(Switzerland) Silvana Tirinzoni 🔨	2	0	2	1	0	3	0	X	8
(South Korea) Kim Ji-suk	0	1	0	0	2	0	1	X	4

=== Draw 4 ===
Wednesday, March 9, 9:00 am

Sheet 2	1	2	3	4	5	6	7	8	Final
(Switzerland) Silvana Tirinzoni 🔨	0	2	0	0	1	2	0	1	6
(Canada) Allison Flaxey	0	0	0	1	0	0	2	0	3

Sheet 3	1	2	3	4	5	6	7	8	Final
(South Korea) Kim Ji-suk 🔨	2	0	0	1	0	0	0	0	3
(Japan) Ayumi Ogasawara	0	2	1	0	1	1	0	5	10

=== Draw 5 ===
Wednesday, March 9, 2:00 pm

Sheet 1	1	2	3	4	5	6	7	8	9	Final
(Canada) Val Sweeting	0	3	0	1	0	0	1	0	1	6
(South Korea) Kim Eun-jung 🔨	1	0	1	0	1	1	0	1	0	5

Sheet 2	1	2	3	4	5	6	7	8	9	Final
(South Korea) Ryu Young-ju	0	0	0	2	1	1	0	1	0	5
(Canada) Michelle Englot 🔨	2	1	1	0	0	0	1	0	2	7

Sheet 3	1	2	3	4	5	6	7	8	Final
(Canada) Allison Flaxey	0	0	1	0	2	0	1	X	4
(Canada) Kelsey Rocque 🔨	0	2	0	2	0	2	0	X	6

=== Draw 6 ===
Wednesday, March 9, 7:00 pm

Sheet 1	1	2	3	4	5	6	7	8	Final
(Switzerland) Silvana Tirinzoni	0	1	0	3	0	3	X	X	7
(Japan) Ayumi Ogasawara 🔨	1	0	1	0	1	0	X	X	3

Sheet 2	1	2	3	4	5	6	7	8	Final
(South Korea) Ryu Young-ju	0	0	1	0	1	0	0	X	2
(United States) Nina Roth 🔨	1	0	0	0	0	2	1	X	4

Sheet 3	1	2	3	4	5	6	7	8	Final
(Canada) Val Sweeting 🔨	0	2	0	4	0	0	0	X	6
(Canada) Michelle Englot	0	0	1	0	1	1	1	X	4

=== Draw 7 ===
Thursday, March 10, 9:00 am

Sheet 1	1	2	3	4	5	6	7	8	Final
(Canada) Allison Flaxey 🔨	0	1	3	0	1	0	1	X	6
(South Korea) Kim Ji-suk	1	0	0	0	0	1	0	X	2

Sheet 2	1	2	3	4	5	6	7	8	Final
(Switzerland) Silvana Tirinzoni	1	1	0	2	0	0	2	X	6
(Canada) Kelsey Rocque 🔨	0	0	0	0	2	1	0	X	3

Sheet 3	1	2	3	4	5	6	7	8	9	Final
(United States) Nina Roth	0	1	0	0	1	2	0	1	0	5
(South Korea) Kim Eun-jung 🔨	1	0	2	1	0	0	1	0	3	8

== Playoffs ==
Quarterfinals
A1	(Canada) Val Sweeting	4
B4	(Canada) Allison Flaxey	8
A3	(United States) Nina Roth	2
B2	(Canada) Kelsey Rocque	5
A2	(South Korea) Kim Eun-jung	5
B3	(Japan) Ayumi Ogasawara	4
A4	(Canada) Michelle Englot	2
B1	(Switzerland) Silvana Tirinzoni	5

Semifinals
B4	(Canada) Allison Flaxey	2
B2	(Canada) Kelsey Rocque	4
A2	(South Korea) Kim Eun-jung	5
B1	(Switzerland) Silvana Tirinzoni	7

Final
B2	(Canada) Kelsey Rocque	5
B1	(Switzerland) Silvana Tirinzoni	1
Third place
B4	(Canada) Allison Flaxey	9
A2	(South Korea) Kim Eun-jung	7

=== Quarterfinals ===
Thursday, March 10, 2:00 pm

Sheet 2	1	2	3	4	5	6	7	8	Final
(Canada) Val Sweeting 🔨	1	0	2	0	1	0	0	X	4
(Canada) Allison Flaxey	0	1	0	3	0	0	4	X	8

Sheet 3	1	2	3	4	5	6	7	8	Final
(Canada) Michelle Englot	0	0	1	0	1	0	0	X	2
(Switzerland) Silvana Tirinzoni 🔨	0	3	0	1	0	0	1	X	5

Thursday, March 10, 7:00 pm

Sheet 2	1	2	3	4	5	6	7	8	Final
(United States) Nina Roth	0	0	0	2	0	0	0	X	2
(Canada) Kelsey Rocque 🔨	0	1	1	0	0	3	0	X	5

Sheet 3	1	2	3	4	5	6	7	8	9	Final
(South Korea) Kim Eun-jung	0	1	0	0	1	0	2	0	1	5
(Japan) Ayumi Ogasawara 🔨	1	0	0	1	0	1	0	1	0	4

=== Semifinals ===
Friday, March 11, 9:00 am

Sheet 2	1	2	3	4	5	6	7	8	Final
(Canada) Allison Flaxey	0	0	1	0	0	0	1	0	2
(Canada) Kelsey Rocque 🔨	2	0	0	1	0	0	0	1	4

Sheet 3	1	2	3	4	5	6	7	8	Final
(South Korea) Kim Eun-jung	0	1	0	2	1	0	1	0	5
(Switzerland) Silvana Tirinzoni 🔨	1	0	3	0	0	0	0	3	7

=== Third place game ===
Friday, March 11, 12:45 pm

Sheet 2	1	2	3	4	5	6	7	8	Final
(Canada) Allison Flaxey 🔨	5	0	2	0	0	2	0	X	9
(South Korea) Kim Eun-jung	0	2	0	2	0	0	3	X	7

=== Final ===
Friday, March 11, 12:45 pm

Sheet 3	1	2	3	4	5	6	7	8	Final
(Canada) Kelsey Rocque	0	0	0	0	0	2	3	X	5
(Switzerland) Silvana Tirinzoni 🔨	0	0	0	0	1	0	0	X	1
