= Taylor McDonald =

Canadian curler (born 1993)

- Curler
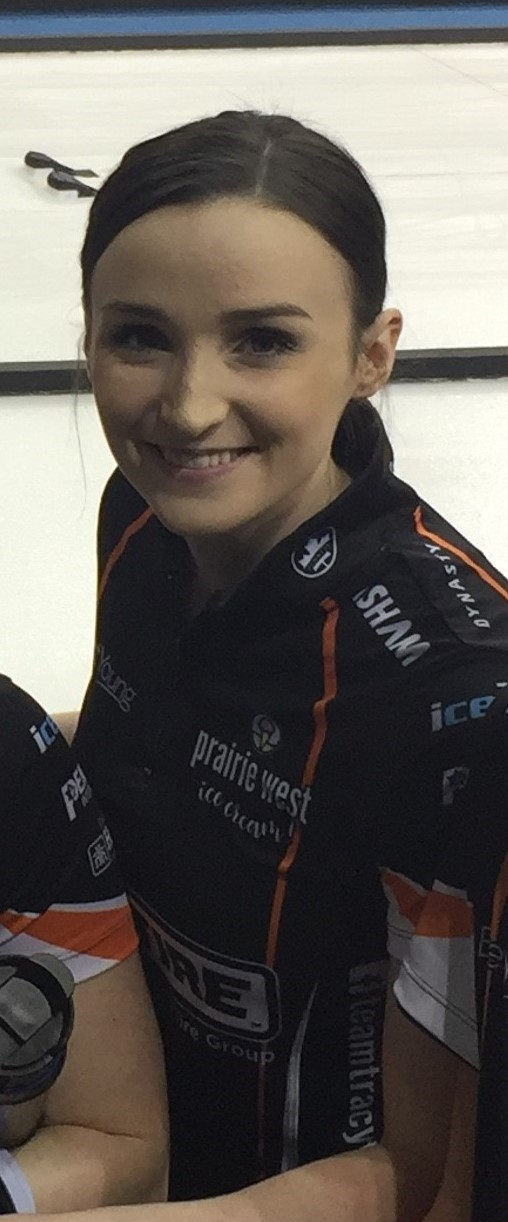
- McDonald at the 2019 Players' Championship
- Born: Taylor Rae McDonald; May 12, 1993 (age 33); Lethbridge, Alberta

Team
- Curling club: Saville Community SC, Edmonton, AB

Curling career
- Member Association: Alberta (2011–2018; 2019–2023); Manitoba (2018–19; 2023–present)
- Hearts: 7 (2019, 2020, 2021, 2022, 2023, 2024, 2025)
- Other appearances: WJCC: 1 (2014); Universiade: 1 (2017)
- Top CTRS ranking: 5th (2017–18, 2021–22)
Medal record
Women's curling
Representing Canada
World Junior Curling Championships
Gold medal – first place	2014 Flims
Winter Universiade
Gold medal – first place	2017 Almaty
Representing Manitoba
Scotties Tournament of Hearts
Bronze medal – third place	2024 Calgary
Representing Alberta
Scotties Tournament of Hearts
Bronze medal – third place	2021 Calgary

Taylor Rae McDonald (born May 12, 1993) is a Canadian curler from Edmonton. McDonald previously played second for Team Kate Cameron, Team Laura Walker and Team Kelsey Rocque, with whom she won gold at the 2014 World Junior Curling Championships and the 2017 Winter Universiade.

== Career ==
=== Juniors ===
McDonald began her junior curling career in the 2011–12 season on Team Kelsey Rocque. In 2014, her team of Rocque, third Keely Brown, lead Claire Tully and coach Amanda-Dawn Coderre won the 2014 Alberta Junior Curling Championship with a 6–5 win over 2012 Canadian Junior champion Jocelyn Peterman in the final. This earned them the right to represent Alberta at the 2014 Canadian Junior Curling Championships in Liverpool, Nova Scotia. Alberta went undefeated in their round robin pool which gave them a berth in the championship pool. They finished 9–1 after the championship pool, with their only loss coming at the hands of Nova Scotia's Mary Fay. This meant that the team would go directly to the final, where they would face British Columbia's Kalia Van Osch. Alberta led the entire game and had an inturn hit for the win and the championship. They won in a 7–6 decision. At the 2014 World Junior Curling Championships, the team finished the round robin with a 7–2 record, losing only to Russia and South Korea. They would then face South Korea in the 1 vs. 2 page playoff, but this time would win in a 7–6 decision. Team Rocque would play South Korea again in the final, but would win in a 6-4 decision to capture the gold medal and the championship. It was the first time a Canadian Women's team would win the championship since 2003.

=== Women's ===
For the 2014–15 season, McDonald joined Team Chelsea Carey at second, with Laura Crocker as third and Jen Gates as lead. The team would win two tour titles that season, the HDF Insurance Shoot-Out and the Boundary Ford Curling Classic. Team Carey also played in three slams that season, making the playoffs in only the 2014 Canadian Open of Curling, where they lost in the quarterfinals. At the 2015 Alberta Scotties Tournament of Hearts, the team would lose in the finals. Following the 2014–15 season, Carey formed a new team, and was replaced by McDonald's former skip Kelsey Rocque. In their first season together, the Rocque rink won the Red Deer Curling Classic and the CCT Uiseong Masters on the tour. The team played in five slams, making it to the quarterfinals in four events. Team Rocque played in the 2016 Alberta Scotties Tournament of Hearts, but failed to make the playoffs. McDonald played in her first Canada Cup at the 2015 Canada Cup of Curling, where her team finished with a 2–4 record, missing the playoffs. Also during the 2015–16 season, McDonald won the 2016 CIS/CCA Curling Championships with the University of Alberta, qualifying her and teammates Rocque, Danielle Schmiemann, Taylore Theroux and Kristen Streifel for the 2017 Winter Universiade the next season.

The following season, The Rocque rink had less success on the tour. They would play in four slams, making it to the quarterfinals in just one event, the 2016 GSOC Tour Challenge. The team played in the 2016 Canada Cup of Curling, but once again missed the playoffs with a 2–4 record. The team made the decision to miss the 2017 Alberta Scotties Tournament of Hearts so that Rocque and McDonald could participate in the Universiade. The team won gold at the Universiade, beating Russia's Victoria Moiseeva 8–3 in the final. In the 2017–18 season, Team Rocque would win the Curl Mesabi Classic and would play in three slams, making it to the quarterfinals at just the 2018 Meridian Canadian Open. The team played in the 2017 Canadian Olympic Curling Pre-Trials, losing in the playoffs. Midway through the season, Walker took over skipping duties of the team, but remained throwing third stones. The Rocque rink played with the new arrangement at the 2018 Alberta Scotties Tournament of Hearts, where they narrowly missed the playoffs. The next month it was announced that the team would be splitting up. In their final event together, with Rocque off the team, the rink would lose in a tiebreaker at the 2018 Players' Championship with Walker skipping and Kendra Lilly brought in to play third.

In March 2018, McDonald announced she was joining a Winnipeg-based team skipped by Allison Flaxey, with third Kate Cameron and lead Raunora Westcott. The team participated in two Slams and finished sixth at the 2019 Manitoba Scotties Tournament of Hearts. McDonald was invited to be Team Fleury's and team Manitoba's alternate at the 2019 Scotties Tournament of Hearts. She played in one game, Draw 11 against Nunavut, where she curled 75%. McDonald also spared for Fleury at the 2019 Players' Championship where they had a quarterfinal finish.

On March 15, 2019, it was announced that McDonald would join the new team of Laura Walker, Kate Cameron and Nadine Scotland for the 2019–20 season. They did not qualify for the playoffs in their first two events, the 2019 Cargill Curling Training Centre Icebreaker and the Booster Juice Shoot-Out before winning the 2019 Mother Club Fall Curling Classic after posting a perfect 7–0 record. McDonald won her first provincial title this season as well, defeating former teammate Kelsey Rocque 7–4 in the 2020 Alberta Scotties Tournament of Hearts final. Representing Alberta at the 2020 Scotties Tournament of Hearts, the team finished pool play with a 3–4 record, failing to qualify for the championship round. It would be the team's last event of the season as both the Players' Championship and the Champions Cup Grand Slam events were cancelled due to the COVID-19 pandemic.

Due to the pandemic, the 2021 Alberta Scotties were cancelled, so Curling Alberta appointed the Walker rink to represent the province at the 2021 Scotties Tournament of Hearts. Team Walker's regular lead Nadine Scotland, who was three-months pregnant, opted not to play in the tournament, which was being held in a "bubble" due to the pandemic. She was replaced by Rachel Brown. At the Scotties, the team finished with a 9–3 round robin record, tied for third with Manitoba, skipped by Jennifer Jones. Alberta beat Manitoba in the tiebreaker, but lost in the semifinal against the defending champion Team Canada rink, skipped by Kerri Einarson, settling for a bronze medal.

In just their second event of the 2021–22 season, Team Walker reached the final of the 2021 Alberta Curling Series: Saville Shoot-Out where they were defeated by Kim Eun-jung. Due to the pandemic, the qualification process for the 2021 Canadian Olympic Curling Trials had to be modified to qualify enough teams for the championship. In these modifications, Curling Canada created the 2021 Canadian Curling Trials Direct-Entry Event, an event where five teams would compete to try to earn one of three spots into the 2021 Canadian Olympic Curling Trials. Team Walker qualified for the Trials Direct-Entry Event due to their CTRS ranking from the 2019–20 season. At the event, the team went 2–2 through the round robin, qualifying for the tiebreaker round where they faced British Columbia's Corryn Brown. After being defeated by Brown in the first game, Team Walker won the second tiebreaker to secure their spot at the Olympic Trials. The team had one more event before the Trials, the 2021 National Grand Slam, where they lost in the quarterfinals to Tracy Fleury. A few weeks later, they competed in the Olympic Trials, held November 20 to 28 in Saskatoon, Saskatchewan. At the event, the team had mixed results, ultimately finishing in sixth place with a 3–5 record.

A few weeks before the Alberta provincial championship, Team Walker won the Alberta Curling Series: Avonair tour event, defeating Casey Scheidegger in the final. They then competed in the 2022 Alberta Scotties Tournament of Hearts, where they posted a 6–1 record through the round robin. This created a three-way tie between Walker, Scheidegger and the Kelsey Rocque rink, however, as Walker had to best draw shot challenge between the three rinks, they advanced directly to the final. There, they met the Scheidegger rink, who defeated Rocque in the semifinal. After a tight final, Walker secured the victory for her team with a draw to the eight-foot to win 6–5. This qualified the team for their second straight national championship. At the 2022 Scotties Tournament of Hearts, the team could not replicate their success from 2021, finishing the round robin with a 3–5 record and missing the playoffs. Team Walker wrapped up their season at the 2022 Players' Championship where they missed the playoffs.

On March 17, 2022, the team announced that they would be disbanding at the end of the 2021–22 season. It was later announced that McDonald and teammate Kate Cameron would be joining Casey Scheidegger and Jessie Haughian for the 2022–23 season. Scheidegger would skip the team, with Cameron playing third, Haughian at second and McDonald at lead. The team found immediate success, reaching back-to-back semifinals at the 2022 Saville Shoot-Out and the 2022 Alberta Curling Series Major. The team then played in the 2022 PointsBet Invitational single elimination tournament, however, without Scheidegger who was on maternity leave. She was replaced by Kristie Moore. The team had tight games in all three of their victories over Kerry Galusha, Rachel Homan and Kaitlyn Lawes to qualify for the final. There, they lost 7–4 to Jennifer Jones. After a semifinal finish at the 2022 Curlers Corner Autumn Gold Curling Classic, Team Scheidegger lost back-to-back finals at the Ladies Alberta Open and the Red Deer Curling Classic to Kayla Skrlik and Rachel Homan respectively. At the 2023 Alberta Scotties Tournament of Hearts, the team finished second through the round robin with a 6–1 record. They then beat Selena Sturmay in the semifinal to qualify for the provincial final where they faced the undefeated Skrlik rink. The game went back and forth, with Skrlik making a highlight reel double takeout in the tenth end to score two and win the game 9–8. Despite this, Team Scheidegger still qualified for the 2023 Scotties Tournament of Hearts as Wild Card #2 thanks to their CTRS points earned throughout the season. At the Hearts, the team finished sixth in their pool with a 3–5 record, earning wins over the Wild Card #3, Newfoundland and Labrador and the Northwest Territories. In Grand Slam play, Team Scheidegger competed in four events, however, failed to reach the playoffs at all four. Their best finish came at the 2022 Masters where they lost in a tiebreaker to Chelsea Carey.

For the 2023–24 season, McDonald moved back to Manitoba, joining a new team skipped by longtime teammate Kate Cameron with third Meghan Walter and lead Mackenzie Elias. The team had immediate success in their first event together, going undefeated to claim the 2023 Icebreaker Challenge. They continued to build momentum throughout their next few events, reaching the final of the Alberta Curling Series Major and the semifinals of the 2023 Saville Shootout and the Mother Club Fall Curling Classic. In Grand Slam play, the team played in four events but failed to reach the playoffs in any of them. At the 2024 Manitoba Scotties Tournament of Hearts, Team Cameron had a strong start with six straight wins to begin the event. They then lost their final two championship round games and the semifinal to Beth Peterson, eliminating them in third. However, their strong results throughout the season earned them an entry into the 2024 Scotties Tournament of Hearts in Calgary. For the Hearts, Kelsey Rocque took McDonald's place in the lineup as she was expecting her first child. Throughout the preliminary round, Team Cameron had mixed results but managed to win both their games on the final day of round robin to earn a championship round berth. There, they knocked off the four-time defending champions Team Kerri Einarson to earn a spot in the final four. After defeating Alberta's Selena Sturmay in the 3 vs. 4 game, they came up short against Jennifer Jones in the semifinal, earning the bronze medal. At the end of the season, the team announced third Meghan Walter was stepping away from competitive curling to focus on school.

== Personal life ==
McDonald currently lives in Edmonton. She is employed as a mortgage broker for Mortgage Design Group. She is married to Kirt (né Dell), and has one son.

== Teams ==
Season	Skip	Third	Second	Lead
2011–12	Kelsey Rocque	Keely Brown	Taylor McDonald	Claire Tully
2012–13	Kelsey Rocque	Keely Brown	Taylor McDonald	Claire Tully
2013–14	Kelsey Rocque	Keely Brown	Taylor McDonald	Claire Tully
2014–15	Chelsea Carey	Laura Crocker	Taylor McDonald	Jen Gates
2015–16	Kelsey Rocque	Laura Crocker	Taylor McDonald	Jen Gates
2016–17	Kelsey Rocque	Laura Crocker	Taylor McDonald	Jen Gates
2017–18	Kelsey Rocque	Laura Crocker	Taylor McDonald	Jen Gates
2018–19	Allison Flaxey	Kate Cameron	Taylor McDonald	Raunora Westcott
2019–20	Laura Walker	Kate Cameron	Taylor McDonald	Nadine Scotland
2020–21	Laura Walker	Kate Cameron	Taylor McDonald	Nadine Scotland; Rachel Brown (Note: Scotland was replaced by Rachel Brown for the 2021 Scotties Tournament of Hearts. Due to the COVID-19 pandemic, Scotland only played one game for the team that season)
2021–22	Laura Walker	Kate Cameron	Taylor McDonald	Nadine Scotland
2022–23	Casey Scheidegger	Kate Cameron	Jessie Haughian	Taylor McDonald
2023–24	Kate Cameron	Meghan Walter	Taylor McDonald	Mackenzie Elias
2024–25	Kate Cameron	Taylor McDonald	Brianna Cullen	Mackenzie Elias
2025–26	Kate Cameron	Briane Harris	Taylor McDonald	Mackenzie Elias
