= 2012 OCT Championships =

- Host city: Oakville, Ontario
- Arena: Oakville Curling Club
- Dates: September 6–9
- Men's winner: (Ontario) Brad Jacobs
- Curling club: Soo CA, Sault Ste. Marie
- Skip: Brad Jacobs
- Third: Ryan Fry
- Second: E. J. Harnden
- Lead: Ryan Harnden
- Finalist: (Ontario) Mark Kean
- Women's winner: (Wisconsin) Erika Brown
- Curling club: Madison CC, Madison
- Skip: Erika Brown
- Third: Debbie McCormick
- Second: Jessica Schultz
- Lead: Ann Swisshelm
- Finalist: (Ontario) Sherry Middaugh

The 2012 OCT Championships was held from September 6 to 9 at the Oakville Curling Club in Oakville, Ontario as part of the 2012–13 Ontario Curling Tour. The event was held in a round robin format, with the purse for the men's event being CAD$23,400, and CAD $15,600 for the women's event.

== Men ==
=== Teams ===
Skip	Third	Second	Lead	Locale
Bowie Abbis-Mills	Craig Van Ymeren	Ed Cyr	Geoff Chambers	Aylmer, Ontario
Mike Anderson	Chris Van Huyse	Matt Sheppard	Sean Harrison	Markham, Ontario
Sean Aune	Ian Dickie	Tyler Stewart	Graham Carr	Toronto, Ontario
Greg Balsdon	Mark Bice	Tyler Morgan	Jamie Farnell	Toronto, Ontario
Ben Bevan	Tyler Sagan	Carter Adair	Derreck Veitch	Ajax, Ontario
Don Bowser	Jonathan Beuk	Matt Broder	TJ Connolly	Ottawa, Ontario
Craig Brown	Kroy Nernberger	Matt Hamilton	Derrick Casper	Madison, Wisconsin
Chris Gardner (fourth)	Mathew Camm	Brad Kidd	Bryan Cochrane (skip)	Ottawa, Ontario
Dayna Deruelle	Andrew McGaugh	Kevin Lagerquist	Evan DeViller	Brampton, Ontario
Connor Duhaime	Evan Lilly	Tyler Jones	Matt Hardman	Haliburton, Ontario
John Epping	Scott Bailey	Scott Howard	David Mathers	Toronto, Ontario
Pat Ferris	Andrew Fairfull	Craig Fairfull	Rob Larmer	Grimsby, Ontario
Joe Frans	Ryan Werenich	Jeff Gorda	Shawn Kaufman	Bradford, Ontario
Christopher Plys (fourth)	Tyler George (skip)	Rich Ruohonen	Colin Hufman	Duluth, Minnesota
Mike Harris	Phil Loevenmark	Scott Foster	Ken McDermot	Oakville, Ontario
Brent Ross (fourth)	Jake Higgs (skip)	Codey Maus	Bill Buchanan	Harriston, Ontario
Brad Jacobs	Ryan Fry	E. J. Harnden	Ryan Harnden	Sault Ste. Marie, Ontario
Wes Johnson	Punit Sthankiya	Kevin Hawkshaw	Mark Bresee	Toronto, Ontario
Josh Johnston	Brian Chick	Matt Lowe	Ryan Parker	Toronto, Ontario
David Kaun	Robert Wright	John Gabel	Al Stahl	Kitchener, Ontario
Mark Kean	Travis Fanset	Patrick Janssen	Tim March	Toronto, Ontario
Shane Latimer	Ritchie Gillan	Terry Scharf	Kevin Rathwell	Ottawa, Ontario
Rob Lobel	Steven Lobel	Trevor Hewitt	Mike Shaye	Whitby, Ontario
Dan Petryk (fourth)	Steve Petryk (skip)	Roland Robinson	Thomas Usselman	Calgary, Alberta
Darryl Prebble	Denis Belanger	Mark Koivula	Dennis Lemon	Toronto, Ontario
Tom Pruliere	Rob Pruliere	Jonathan Doan	Jeff Young	Sarnia, Ontario
Robert Rumfeldt	Adam Spencer	Scott Hodgson	Greg Robinson	Guelph, Ontario
Jason Camm (fourth)	Aaron Squires (skip)	Dave Easter	Curtis Easter	St. Thomas, Ontario
Wayne Tuck, Jr.	Chad Allen	Jay Allen	Caleb Flaxey	Toronto, Ontario
Kieran Scott (fourth)	Patrick Clarke	Jamie Waters	Matt Wilkenson (skip)	Hamilton, Ontario

=== Round Robin Standings ===
Key
Teams to Playoffs
Teams to Tiebreaker

Pool A	W	L
(Ontario) Mike Anderson	3	1
(Ontario) Mike Harris	3	1
(Ontario) John Epping	2	2
(Ontario) Don Bowser	1	3
(Ontario) Connor Duhaime	1	3

Pool D	W	L
(Ontario) Mark Kean	4	0
(Wisconsin) Craig Brown	2	2
(Ontario) Josh Johnston	2	2
(Ontario) Bowie Abbis-Mills	1	3
(Ontario) Sean Aune	1	3

Pool B	W	L
(Ontario) Bryan Cochrane	3	1
(Ontario) Brad Jacobs	3	1
(Ontario) Aaron Squires	2	2
(Ontario) Rob Lobel	1	3
(Ontario) Tom Pruliere	1	3

Pool E	W	L
(Ontario) Wayne Tuck, Jr.	3	1
(Ontario) Pat Ferris	3	1
(Ontario) Jake Higgs	3	1
(Ontario) Joe Frans	1	3
(Ontario) Matt Wilkenson	0	4

Pool C	W	L
(Ontario) Robert Rumfeldt	4	0
(Ontario) Dayna Deruelle	2	2
(Alberta) Steve Petryk	2	2
(Ontario) Ben Bevan	1	3
(Ontario) Darryl Prebble	1	3

Pool F	W	L
(Ontario) Greg Balsdon	4	0
(Minnesota) Tyler George	3	1
(Ontario) Shane Latimer	2	2
(Ontario) Wes Johnson	1	3
(Ontario) David Kaun	0	4

=== Tiebreakers ===
Team	Final
(Ontario) Jake Higgs	6
(Ontario) Pat Ferris 🔨	5

Team	Final
(Wisconsin) Craig Brown	7
(Ontario) Josh Johnston 🔨	1

Team	Final
(Ontario) Dayna Deruelle 🔨	4
(Alberta) Steve Petryk	9

=== Playoffs ===
Quarterfinal 1
(Ontario) Brad Jacobs	4
(Wisconsin) Craig Brown	2
(Ontario) Wayne Tuck, Jr.	5
(Ontario) Mike Anderson	6
(Ontario) Mike Harris	7
(Ontario) Jake Higgs	2
(Minnesota) Tyler George	5
(Alberta) Steve Petryk	6

Quarterfinal 2
(Ontario) Robert Rumfeldt	3
(Ontario) Brad Jacobs	5
(Ontario) Bryan Cochrane	7
(Ontario) Mike Anderson	6
(Ontario) Greg Balsdon	7
(Ontario) Mike Harris	3
(Ontario) Mark Kean	6
(Alberta) Steve Petryk	2

Semifinals
(Ontario) Brad Jacobs	7
(Ontario) Bryan Cochrane	5
(Ontario) Greg Balsdon	6
(Ontario) Mark Kean	7

Final
(Ontario) Brad Jacobs	6
(Ontario) Mark Kean	3

== Women ==
=== Teams ===
Skip	Third	Second	Lead	Locale
Cathy Auld	Janet Murphy	Stephanie Gray	Melissa Foster	Mississauga, Ontario
Marika Bakewell	Jessica Corrado	Stephanie Corrado	Jordan Robertson	Burlington, Ontario
Erika Brown	Debbie McCormick	Jessica Schultz	Ann Swisshelm	Madison, Wisconsin
Chrissy Cadorin	Janet Langevinl	Sandy Becher	Cindy McKnight	Toronto, Ontario
Kelly Cochrane	Brenna Cochrane	Adele Campbell	Joanne Curtis	Toronto, Ontario
Ginger Coyle	Lauren Wood	Laura Brown	Robyn Murphy	Dundas, Ontario
Lisa Farnell	Erin Morrissey	Karen Sagle	Ainsley Galbraith	Elgin, Ontario
Julie Hastings	Christy Trombley	Stacey Smith	Katrina Collins	Thornhill, Ontario
Rachel Homan	Emma Miskew	Alison Kreviazuk	Lisa Weagle	Ottawa, Ontario
Katie Lindsay	Nicole Westlund	Jenn Clark	Stephanie Thompson	Welland, Ontario
Heather Marshall	Margie Hewitt	Amy Mackay	Abbie Darnley	Barrie, Ontario
Susan McKnight	Catherine Kaino	Karen Rowsell	Jordan Ariss	Uxbridge, Ontario
Sherry Middaugh	Jo-Ann Rizzo	Lee Merklinger	Leigh Armstrong	Coldwater, Ontario
Jill Mouzar	Stephanie LeDrew	Danielle Inglis	Hollie Nicol	Toronto, Ontario
Allison Nimik	Katie Pringle	Lynn Kreviazuk	Morgan Court	Toronto, Ontario
Brit O'Neill	Mallory Buist	Jenn Minchin	Jasmine Thurston	Hamilton, Ontario
Julie Reddick	Carrie Lindner	Megan Balsdon	Laura Hickey	Toronto, Ontario
Jamie Sinclair	Holly Donaldson	Erin Jenkins	Katelyn Wasylkiw	Manotick, Ontario
Jennifer Spencer	Karyn Issler	Jenn Ellard	Michelle Laidlaw	Brampton, Ontario
Stephanie Van Huyse	Sheryl Tavoularis	Laura Arbour	Jennifer Allan	Whitby, Ontario

=== Round Robin Standings ===
Key
Teams to Playoffs

Pool G	W	L
(Ontario) Susan McKnight	4	0
(Ontario) Allison Nimik	3	1
(Ontario) Rachel Homan	2	2
(Ontario) Jamie Sinclair	1	3
(Ontario) Stephanie Van Huyse	0	4

Pool H	W	L
(Ontario) Sherry Middaugh	4	0
(Ontario) Jennifer Spencer	2	2
(Ontario) Lisa Farnell	2	2
(Ontario) Heather Marshall	2	2
(Ontario) Ginger Coyle	0	4

Pool I	W	L
(Ontario) Cathy Auld	4	0
(Ontario) Brit O'Neill	2	2
(Ontario) Julie Reddick	2	2
(Ontario) Chrissy Cadorin	1	3
(Ontario) Kelly Cochrane	1	3

Pool J	W	L
(Wisconsin) Erika Brown	4	0
(Ontario) Jill Mouzar	2	2
(Ontario) Marika Bakewell	2	2
(Ontario) Julie Hastings	2	2
(Ontario) Katie Lindsay	0	4

=== Playoffs ===
Quarterfinals
(Ontario) Cathy Auld	9
(Ontario) Allison Nimik	3
(Ontario) Sherry Middaugh	5
(Ontario) Jill Mouzar	4
(Wisconsin) Erika Brown	8
(Ontario) Jennifer Spencer	6
(Ontario) Susan McKnight	8
(Ontario) Brit O'Neill	7

Semifinals
(Ontario) Cathy Auld	2
(Ontario) Sherry Middaugh	6
(Wisconsin) Erika Brown	7
(Ontario) Susan McKnight	6

Final
(Ontario) Sherry Middaugh	2
(Wisconsin) Erika Brown	7
