= 2013 Stu Sells Oakville Tankard =

2013 StuSells Oakville Tankard
- Host city: Oakville, Ontario
- Dates: September 5–8
- Men's winner: (Ontario) Brad Jacobs
- Curling club: Soo CA, Sault Ste. Marie
- Skip: Brad Jacobs
- Third: Ryan Fry
- Second: E. J. Harnden
- Lead: Ryan Harnden
- Finalist: (Alberta) Kevin Koe
- Women's winner: (Ontario) Sherry Middaugh
- Curling club: Coldwater & District CC, Coldwater
- Skip: Sherry Middaugh
- Third: Jo-Ann Rizzo
- Second: Lee Merklinger
- Lead: Leigh Armstrong
- Finalist: (Ontario) Cathy Auld

The 2013 StuSells Oakville Tankard was held from September 5 to 8 in Oakville, Ontario as part of the 2013–14 World Curling Tour. Both the men's and women's events were held in a round robin format. The purse for the men's event was CAD$34,000, of which the winner, Brad Jacobs, received CAD$8,000, while the purse for the women's event was CAD$24,000, of which the winner, Sherry Middaugh, received CAD$5,000.

Jacobs successfully defended his title by defeating Kevin Koe with a score of 4–3, while Middaugh defeated Cathy Auld with a score of 5–4 in an extra end.

== Men ==
=== Teams ===
The teams are listed as follows:

Skip	Third	Second	Lead	Locale
Mike Anderson	Mike McLean	Chris Van Huyse	Sean Harrison	Markham, Ontario
Greg Balsdon	Mark Bice	Tyler Morgan	Jamie Farnell	Toronto, Ontario
Ben Bevan	Zach Shurtleff	Carter Adair	Ben Bernier	Ajax, Ontario
Don Bowser	Jonathan Beuk		Scott Chadwick	Ottawa, Ontario
Chris Ciasnocha	Jon St. Denis	Ian Dickle	Ian Fleming	Stouffville, Ontario
Brady Clark	Sean Beighton	Darren Lehto	Phil Tilker	(Washington (state)) Lynnwood, Washington
Mathew Camm (fourth)	Chris Gardner	Brad Kidd	Bryan Cochrane (skip)	Nepean, Ontario
Terry Corbin	Kelly Schuh	Andrew Tournay	James Freeman	Brantford, Ontario
Mark Dacey	Stuart Thompson	Stephen Burgess	Andrew Gibson	Halifax, Nova Scotia
Robert Desjardins	Frederic Lawton	Miguel Bernard	Martin Lavoie	Saguenay, Quebec
John Epping	Scott Bailey	Collin Mitchell	David Mathers	Toronto, Ontario
Pete Fenson	Shawn Rojeski	Joe Polo	Ryan Brunt	Bemidji, Minnesota
Pat Ferris	Andrew Fairfull	Craig Fairfull	Robert Larmer	Grimsby, Ontario
Joe Frans	Ryan Werenich	Jeff Gorda	Shawn Kaufman	Ontario
Christopher Plys (fourth)	Tyler George (skip)	Rich Ruohonen	Colin Hufman	Duluth, Minnesota
Brad Gushue	Brett Gallant	Adam Casey	Geoff Walker	St. John's, Newfoundland and Labrador
Brent Ross (fourth)	Jake Higgs (skip)	Codey Maus	Bill Buchanan	Ontario
Rayad Husain	Michael Checca	Jeff Brown	Travis Belchior	Brampton, Ontario
Brad Jacobs	Ryan Fry	E. J. Harnden	Ryan Harnden	Sault Ste. Marie, Ontario
Josh Johnston	Wes Johnson	Matt Lowe	Ryan Parker	Toronto, Ontario
Mark Kean	Travis Fanset	Patrick Janssen	Tim March	Ontario
Craig Kochan	Phil Loevenmark	Andrew Clayton	Geoff Chambers	Toronto, Ontario
Kevin Koe	Pat Simmons	Carter Rycroft	Nolan Thiessen	Calgary, Alberta
Paul Madgett	Rob Melhuish	Don Pearson	Al Kirchner	Oakville, Ontario
Heath McCormick	Bill Stopera	Martin Sather	Dean Gemmell	(New York (state)) New York City, New York
Jean-Michel Ménard	Martin Crête	Éric Sylvain	Philippe Ménard	Gatineau, Quebec
Ryan Myler	Shane Latimer	Kevin Lagerquist	Evan DeViller	Brampton, Ontario
Matt Paul	Brett Lyon-Hatcher	Ben Miskew	John Steski	Ottawa, Ontario
Darryl Prebble	Denis Belanger	Mark Koivula	Dennis Lemon	Toronto, Ontario
Rob Retchless	Punit Sthankiya	Dave Ellis	Rob Ainsley	Toronto, Ontario
Nick Rizzo	Jim Wilson	Tom Roblin	Rob Gregg	Brantford, Ontario
Wayne Tuck, Jr.	Chad Allen	Jay Allen	Caleb Flaxey	Brantford, Ontario
Craig Van Ymeren	Matt Mapletoft	Scott Brandon	Shane Konings	Aylmer, Ontario
Jake Walker	Dayna Deruelle	Andrew McGaugh	Michael McGaugh	Brampton, Ontario

=== Round Robin Standings ===
Final Round Robin Standings

Key
Teams to Playoffs

Pool A	W	L
(Alberta) Kevin Koe	4	0
(Washington (state)) Brady Clark	2	2
(Minnesota) Tyler George	2	2
(Ontario) Don Bowser	1	2
(Quebec) Robert Desjardins	0	3

Pool B	W	L
(Ontario) Brad Jacobs	4	0
(Ontario) Pat Ferris	3	1
(Ontario) Chris Ciasnocha	2	2
(Minnesota) Pete Fenson	1	3
(Ontario) Ben Bevan	0	4

Pool C	W	L
(Ontario) Jake Higgs	3	1
(Newfoundland and Labrador) Brad Gushue	3	1
(Ontario) Rob Retchless	2	2
(New York (state)) Heath McCormick	2	2
(Ontario) Josh Johnston	0	4

Pool D	W	L
(Ontario) Craig Kochan	3	1
(Ontario) Wayne Tuck, Jr.	3	1
(Ontario) John Epping	2	2
(Nova Scotia) Mark Dacey	1	3
(Ontario) Terry Corbin	1	3

Pool E	W	L
(Ontario) Rob Rumfeldt	4	0
(Ontario) Mark Kean	3	1
(Ontario) Mike Anderson	2	2
(Ontario) Rayad Husain	1	3
(Ontario) Matt Paul	0	4

Pool F	W	L
(Quebec) Jean-Michel Ménard	4	0
(Ontario) Bryan Cochrane	3	1
(Ontario) Paul Madgett	1	3
(Ontario) Ryan Myler	1	3
(Ontario) Jake Walker	1	3

Pool G	W	L
(Ontario) Joe Frans	3	1
(Ontario) Craig Van Ymeren	3	1
(Ontario) Nick Rizzo	3	1
(Ontario) Darryl Prebble	1	3
(Ontario) Greg Balsdon	0	4

=== Playoffs ===
The playoffs draw is listed as follows:

Round of 16
(Ontario) Craig Van Ymeren	6
(Ontario) Craig Kochan	5
(Ontario) Brad Jacobs	9
(Ontario) Wayne Tuck, Jr.	3
(Ontario) Jake Higgs	2
(Ontario) Bryan Cochrane	5
(Ontario) Joe Frans	3
(Ontario) Pat Ferris	2
(Ontario) Rob Rumfeldt	5
(Ontario) Nick Rizzo	6
(Ontario) Mark Kean	1
(Newfoundland and Labrador) Brad Gushue	7

Quarterfinals
(Quebec) Jean-Michel Ménard	6
(Ontario) Craig Van Ymeren	5
(Ontario) Brad Jacobs	4
(Ontario) Bryan Cochrane	3
(Alberta) Kevin Koe	3
(Ontario) Joe Frans	2
(Ontario) Nick Rizzo	2
(Newfoundland and Labrador) Brad Gushue	7

Semifinals
(Quebec) Jean-Michel Ménard	3
(Ontario) Brad Jacobs	5
(Alberta) Kevin Koe	7
(Newfoundland and Labrador) Brad Gushue	3

Final
(Ontario) Brad Jacobs	4
(Alberta) Kevin Koe	3

== Women ==
=== Teams ===
The teams are listed as follows:

Skip	Third	Second	Lead	Locale
Cathy Auld	Janet Murphy	Stephanie Gray	Melissa Foster	Ontario
Marika Bakewell	Jessica Corrado	Stephanie Corrado	Jasmine Thurston	Markdale, Ontario
Erika Brown	Debbie McCormick	Jessica Schultz	Ann Swisshelm	Madison, Wisconsin
Chrissy Cadorin	Katie Lindsay	Stephanie Thompson	Lauren Wood	Toronto, Ontario
Lisa Farnell	Erin Morrissey	Karen Sagle	Ainsley Galbraith	Elgin, Ontario
Allison Flaxey	Katie Pringle	Lynn Kreviazuk	Morgan Court	Listowel, Ontario
Courtney George	Aileen Sormunen	Amanda McLean	Monica Walker	St. Paul, Minnesota
Jacqueline Harrison	Kimberly Tuck	Susan Froud	Andra Aldred	Brantford, Ontario
Julie Hastings	Cheryl McPherson	Stacey Smith	Katrina Collins	Thornhill, Ontario
Tracy Horgan	Jenn Horgan	Jenna Enge	Amanda Gates	Sudbury, Ontario
Vicki Marianchuk	Louise Germain	Carolyn Edison	Lynne Corrado	Ontario
Susan McKnight	Catherine Kaino	Karen Rowsell	Joanne Curtis	Uxbridge, Ontario
Sherry Middaugh	Jo-Ann Rizzo	Lee Merklinger	Leigh Armstrong	Coldwater, Ontario
Victorya Moiseeva	Nkeiruka Ezekh	Ekaterina Antonova	Aleksandra Saitova	Moscow, Russia
Hollie Nicol	Stephanie LeDrew	Danielle Inglis	Courtney Davies	Toronto, Ontario
Brit O'Neill	Jamie Sinclair	Kim Brown	Trish Scharf	Ottawa, Ontario
Cissi Östlund	Sabina Kraupp	Sara Carlsson	Paulina Stein	Karlstad, Sweden
Alina Pätz	Nadine Lehmann	Nicole Schwägli	Nicole Dünki	Basel, Switzerland
Allison Pottinger	Nicole Joraanstad	Natalie Nicholson	Tabitha Peterson	Bemidji, Minnesota
Julie Reddick	Carrie Lindner	Megan Balsdon	Laura Hickey	Toronto, Ontario
Allison Ross	Melissa Gannon	Brittany O'Rourke	Pamela Nugent	Montreal, Quebec
Anna Sidorova	Liudmila Privivkova	Margarita Fomina	Ekaterina Galkina	Moscow, Russia
Barb Spencer	Katie Spencer	Ainsley Champagne	Raunora Westcott	Winnipeg, Manitoba
Jennifer Spencer	Jaimee Gardner	Amanda Gebhardt	Becky Philpott	Guelph, Ontario
Jill Thurston	Brette Richards	Brandi Oliver	Blaine de Jager	Winnipeg, Manitoba
Ashley Waye	Mallory Buist	Denise Donovan	Angela Cerantola	Toronto, Ontario

=== Round Robin Standings ===
Final Round Robin Standings

Key
Teams to Playoffs

Pool A	W	L
(Sweden) Cissi Östlund	3	1
(Russia) Anna Sidorova	2	2
(Ontario) Allison Flaxey	2	2
(Russia) Victorya Moiseeva	2	2
(Ontario) Britt O'Neill	1	3

Pool B	W	L
(Ontario) Sherry Middaugh	4	0
(Ontario) Julie Reddick	3	1
(Minnesota) Allison Pottinger	2	2
(Quebec) Allison Ross	1	3
(Ontario) Marika Bakewell	0	4

Pool C	W	L
(Ontario) Cathy Auld	4	0
(Ontario) Hollie Nicol	3	1
(Switzerland) Silvana Tirinzoni	2	2
(Ontario) Jennifer Spencer	1	3
(Ontario) Ashley Waye	0	4

Pool D	W	L
(Wisconsin) Erika Brown	4	0
(Minnesota) Courtney George	2	2
(Ontario) Chrissy Cadorin	2	2
(Ontario) Lisa Farnell	1	3
(Ontario) Jacqueline Harrison	1	3

Pool E	W	L
(Ontario) Julie Hastings	4	0
(Switzerland) Alina Pätz	3	1
(Ontario) Susan McKnight	2	2
(Ontario) Tracy Horgan	1	3
(Ontario) Vicki Marianchuk	0	4

=== Playoffs ===
The playoffs draw is listed as follows:

Round of 16
(Ontario) Hollie Nicol	3
(Russia) Anna Sidorova	6
(Switzerland) Alina Pätz	6
(Minnesota) Courtney George	5

Quarterfinals
(Ontario) Julie Hastings	7
(Russia) Anna Sidorova	2
(Ontario) Cathy Auld	7
(Sweden) Cissi Östlund	4
(Wisconsin) Erika Brown	5
(Switzerland) Alina Pätz	4
(Ontario) Sherry Middaugh	6
(Ontario) Julie Reddick	1

Semifinals
(Ontario) Julie Hastings	3
(Ontario) Cathy Auld	9
(Wisconsin) Erika Brown	3
(Ontario) Sherry Middaugh	6

Final
(Ontario) Cathy Auld	4
(Ontario) Sherry Middaugh	5
