= 2026 Stu Sells Oakville Tankard =

- Host city: Oakville, Ontario
- Arena: Oakville Curling Club
- Dates: September 10–14
- Men's winner: (United States) Team Casper
- Curling club: Chaska CC, Chaska
- Skip: Daniel Casper
- Third: Luc Violette
- Second: Ben Richardson
- Lead: Aidan Oldenburg
- Finalist: (Manitoba) Jordon McDonald
- Women's winner: (Switzerland) Team Pätz
- Curling club: CC Genève, Geneva
- Skip: Alina Pätz
- Third: Selina Witschonke
- Second: Stefanie Berset
- Lead: Renée Frigo
- Finalist: (Switzerland) Xenia Schwaller

The 2026 Stu Sells Oakville Tankard was held from September 10 to 14 at the Oakville Curling Club in Oakville, Ontario. The event was held in a triple knockout format with a purse of $48,000 on the men's side and $36,000 on the women's side. It is the first Stu Sells sponsored event held as part of the 2026–27 season.

This event was also a satellite Grand Slam of Curling event, meaning the highest ranking non-qualified team on the men's and women's sides earned a spot at the 2026 GSOC Open in Thunder Bay. As the winner of the men's event, Team Casper, had already qualified, Manitoba's Team Jordon McDonald qualified for the slam as the runner-up. On the women's side, as both finalists were already qualified for the GSOC Open, the spot went to the highest-ranked semifinalist in the world rankings at the time of the tournament, Switzerland's Team Corrie Hürlimann.

== Men ==
=== Teams ===
The teams are listed as follows:

Skip	Third	Second	Lead	Alternate	Locale
Félix Asselin	Julien Tremblay	Jesse Mullen	Jean-Michel Arsenault		Laval, Quebec
Brendan Bottcher	Jacob Horgan	Tanner Horgan	Geoff Walker		Edmonton, Alberta
Jason Camm	Sam Wills	Wyatt Small	Nathan Steele		Navan, Ontario
Orrin Carson	Logan Carson	Archie Hyslop	Charlie Gibb		Dumfries, Scotland
Daniel Casper	Luc Violette	Ben Richardson	Aidan Oldenburg		(United States) Chaska, Minnesota
Jordan Chandler	Landan Rooney	Connor Lawes	Nathan Kim		Little Current, Ontario
Scott Dunnam	Cody Clouser	Alex Leichter	Andrew Dunnam		(United States) Philadelphia, Pennsylvania
Matt Dunstone	Colton Lott	Mark Nichols	Ryan Harnden		Winnipeg, Manitoba
John Epping	B.J. Neufeld	Ryan Wiebe	Ian McMillan		Winnipeg, Manitoba
Mike Fournier	Charlie Richard	Punit Sthankiya	Graeme Robson		Toronto, Ontario
Caden Hebert	Jackson Bestland	Benji Paral	Jack Wendtland		(United States) Eau Claire, Wisconsin
Daniel Hocevar	Zander Elmes	Joel Matthews	Daniel Del Conte		Toronto, Ontario
Philipp Hösli (Fourth)	Marco Hösli (Skip)	Simon Gloor	Justin Hausherr		Glarus, Switzerland
Scott Howard	David Mathers	Pat Janssen	Scott Chadwick		Midland, Ontario
Mark Kean	Luke Saunders	Nathan Gray	Ryan Abraham		Halifax, Nova Scotia
Jordan Keon	Fionn Keon	Mike Foster	Nolan Galardo		Richmond Hill, Ontario
Jayden King	Dylan Niepage	Owen Henry	Victor Pietrangelo		Tillsonburg, Ontario
Lukáš Klíma	Vít Chabičovský	Martin Jurík	Lukáš Klípa		Prague, Czech Republic
Riley Smith (Note: Riley Smith skipped Team Lott in the absence of Tanner Lott. The rest of the team moved up the lineup one position.)	Adam Flatt	Sean Flatt	Justin Twiss		Winnipeg, Manitoba
Evan MacDougall	Dylan Stockton	Evan Madore	Carson Kay	Ryne Fisher	Fergus, Ontario
Jordon McDonald	Jacques Gauthier	Elias Huminicki	Cameron Olafson		Winnipeg, Manitoba
Sam Mooibroek	Owen Purcell	Scott Mitchell	Gavin Lydiate		Whitby, Ontario
Kibo Mulima	Riley Fung-Ernst	Nate Thomas	Daniel Krowchuk		Waterloo, Ontario
Joël Retornaz	Stefano Gilli	Andrea Gilli	Alberto Pimpini		Brunico, Italy
Kim Schwaller	Max Winz	Andreas Gerlach	Jan Iseli		Oberwallis, Switzerland
John Shuster	Andrew Stopera	Mark Fenner	Lance Wheeler		(United States) Duluth, Minnesota
Stefano Spiller (Fourth)	Ryan Fry (Skip) (Note: Ryan Fry spared for Amos Mosaner.)	Sebastiano Arman	Cesare Spiller		Trentino, Italy
Colten Steele	Rene Comeau	Alex Robichaud	Cameron Sallaj		Fredericton, New Brunswick
Ryan Thompson-Brown	Joseph Trieu	Devon Ryan	Marty Thompson		Toronto, Ontario
Kyle Waddell	Mark Watt	Duncan McFadzean (Note: Duncan McFadzean spared for Angus Bryce who was recovering from an injury.)	Blair Haswell		Hamilton, Scotland
Nathan Young	Brady Lumley	Matthew Garner	Spencer Dunlop		Oakville, Ontario
Mattia Giovanella (Fourth)	Alberto Zisa (Skip)	Francesco De Zanna	Francesco Vigliani		Trentino, Italy

=== Knockout Brackets ===
==== A Event ====
First Knockout	Qualifier 1
(Manitoba) Matt Dunstone	7
(Ontario) Ryan Thompson-Brown	6	(Manitoba) Matt Dunstone	6
(Ontario) Sam Mooibroek	8	(Ontario) Sam Mooibroek	3
(Italy) Alberto Zisa	7	(Manitoba) Matt Dunstone	4
(Italy) Joël Retornaz	7	(Italy) Joël Retornaz	5
(Ontario) Scott Howard	2	(Italy) Joël Retornaz	7
(Ontario) Jayden King	4	(Ontario) Mike Fournier	6
(Ontario) Mike Fournier	5	(Italy) Joël Retornaz	4
(Italy) Team Spiller	8	(Switzerland) Marco Hösli	8
(Ontario) Kibo Mulima	4	(Italy) Team Spiller	3
(Czech Republic) Lukáš Klíma	6	(Czech Republic) Lukáš Klíma	7
(Quebec) Félix Asselin	4	(Czech Republic) Lukáš Klíma	3
(Switzerland) Marco Hösli	8	(Switzerland) Marco Hösli	5
(Ontario) Jordan Chandler	3	(Switzerland) Marco Hösli	8
(Switzerland) Kim Schwaller	3	(Ontario) Jason Camm	3
(Ontario) Jason Camm	6

First Knockout	Qualifier 2
(United States) Daniel Casper	7
(Ontario) Jordan Keon	1	(United States) Daniel Casper	6
(Ontario) Nathan Young	2	(United States) Caden Hebert	8
(United States) Caden Hebert	4	(United States) Caden Hebert	7
(Manitoba) John Epping	7	(Manitoba) Jordon McDonald	8
(United States) Scott Dunnam	5	(Manitoba) John Epping	4
(Manitoba) Jordon McDonald	8	(Manitoba) Jordon McDonald	5
(Ontario) Daniel Hocevar	2	(Manitoba) Jordon McDonald	3
(Scotland) Kyle Waddell	9	(Alberta) Brendan Bottcher	7
(Ontario) Evan MacDougall	3	(Scotland) Kyle Waddell	7
(United States) John Shuster	8	(United States) John Shuster	3
(Nova Scotia) Mark Kean	2	(Scotland) Kyle Waddell	4
(Alberta) Brendan Bottcher	9	(Alberta) Brendan Bottcher	5
(New Brunswick) Colten Steele	3	(Alberta) Brendan Bottcher	5
(Scotland) Orrin Carson	7	(Scotland) Orrin Carson	3
(Manitoba) Team Lott	1

==== B Event ====
Second Knockout	Qualifier 3
(United States) Caden Hebert	9
(Italy) Alberto Zisa	3
(Scotland) Orrin Carson	5
(Ontario) Ryan Thompson-Brown	1	(Italy) Alberto Zisa	6
(Italy) Alberto Zisa	9	(United States) Caden Hebert	7
(Czech Republic) Lukáš Klíma	5
(Czech Republic) Lukáš Klíma	8
(Ontario) Jayden King	4
(United States) John Shuster	5
(Ontario) Scott Howard	1	(Ontario) Jayden King	6
(Ontario) Jayden King	9	(United States) Caden Hebert	2
(United States) Daniel Casper	6
(Italy) Joël Retornaz	2
(United States) Daniel Casper	10
(Manitoba) John Epping	8
(Ontario) Kibo Mulima	2	(Quebec) Félix Asselin	5
(Quebec) Félix Asselin	5	(Manitoba) John Epping	4
(United States) Daniel Casper	8
(United States) Daniel Casper	6
(Ontario) Jordan Chandler	3	(Switzerland) Kim Schwaller	2
(Switzerland) Kim Schwaller	4

Second Knockout	Qualifier 4
(Scotland) Kyle Waddell	6
(Ontario) Jason Camm	2
(Ontario) Jason Camm	7
(Ontario) Jordan Keon	1	(Ontario) Nathan Young	2
(Ontario) Nathan Young	7	(Scotland) Kyle Waddell	6
(Manitoba) Matt Dunstone	5
(Manitoba) Matt Dunstone	7
(Italy) Team Spiller	5
(Italy) Team Spiller	7
(United States) Scott Dunnam	4	(Ontario) Daniel Hocevar	6
(Ontario) Daniel Hocevar	6	(Scotland) Kyle Waddell	7
(Manitoba) Jordon McDonald	6
(Manitoba) Jordon McDonald	6
(Nova Scotia) Mark Kean	2
(Ontario) Mike Fournier	6
(Ontario) Evan MacDougall	5	(Nova Scotia) Mark Kean	8
(Nova Scotia) Mark Kean	10	(Nova Scotia) Mark Kean	10
(Ontario) Sam Mooibroek	7
(Ontario) Sam Mooibroek	7
(New Brunswick) Colten Steele	7	(New Brunswick) Colten Steele	2
(Manitoba) Team Lott	5

==== C Event ====
Third Knockout	Qualifier 5
(Ontario) Jason Camm	3
(Ontario) Ryan Thompson-Brown	2	(Ontario) Scott Howard	8
(Ontario) Scott Howard	9	(Ontario) Scott Howard	4
(Italy) Team Spiller	9
(Italy) Team Spiller	7
(Ontario) Kibo Mulima	8	(Ontario) Kibo Mulima	4
(Ontario) Jordan Chandler	4	(Italy) Team Spiller	5
(United States) Caden Hebert	6

Third Knockout	Qualifier 6
(Nova Scotia) Mark Kean	4
(United States) John Shuster	9
(Scotland) Orrin Carson	5
(United States) John Shuster	7
(United States) John Shuster	6
(Manitoba) Matt Dunstone	3
(Manitoba) Matt Dunstone	6
(Quebec) Félix Asselin	3
(Ontario) Sam Mooibroek	3
(Quebec) Félix Asselin	6	(Quebec) Félix Asselin	6
(Switzerland) Kim Schwaller	5

Third Knockout	Qualifier 7
(Czech Republic) Lukáš Klíma	5
(Manitoba) John Epping	8
(Manitoba) John Epping	5
(Ontario) Mike Fournier	6	(New Brunswick) Colten Steele	2
(New Brunswick) Colten Steele	10	(Manitoba) John Epping	3
(Italy) Joël Retornaz	4
(Italy) Joël Retornaz	10
(Ontario) Nathan Young	8
(Ontario) Nathan Young	6
(Ontario) Daniel Hocevar	5

Third Knockout	Qualifier 8
(Italy) Alberto Zisa	6
(Ontario) Jordan Keon	3	(United States) Scott Dunnam	7
(United States) Scott Dunnam	10	(United States) Scott Dunnam	7
(Ontario) Jayden King	3
(Ontario) Jayden King	9
(Ontario) Evan MacDougall	6	(Manitoba) Team Lott	3
(Manitoba) Team Lott	8	(United States) Scott Dunnam	3
(Manitoba) Jordon McDonald	6

=== Knockout Results ===
All draw times are listed in Eastern Time (UTC−04:00).

==== Draw 1 ====
Thursday, September 10, 6:00 pm

Sheet 1	1	2	3	4	5	6	7	8	Final
(Czech Republic) Lukáš Klíma	0	0	2	0	1	0	2	1	6
(Quebec) Félix Asselin 🔨	0	1	0	1	0	2	0	0	4

Sheet 2	1	2	3	4	5	6	7	8	9	Final
(Ontario) Sam Mooibroek	0	3	1	0	1	1	1	0	1	8
(Italy) Alberto Zisa 🔨	2	0	0	2	0	0	0	3	0	7

Sheet 3	1	2	3	4	5	6	7	8	Final
(Italy) Joël Retornaz 🔨	1	1	0	2	0	3	X	X	7
(Ontario) Scott Howard	0	0	1	0	1	0	X	X	2

Sheet 4	1	2	3	4	5	6	7	8	9	Final
(Ontario) Jayden King	0	0	0	0	2	0	0	2	0	4
(Ontario) Mike Fournier 🔨	0	0	0	3	0	1	0	0	1	5

Sheet 5	1	2	3	4	5	6	7	8	Final
(Italy) Team Spiller	1	0	1	0	1	3	0	2	8
(Ontario) Kibo Mulima 🔨	0	2	0	1	0	0	1	0	4

Sheet 6	1	2	3	4	5	6	7	8	Final
(Manitoba) Matt Dunstone	0	1	0	1	2	0	3	0	7
(Ontario) Ryan Thompson-Brown 🔨	3	0	1	0	0	1	0	1	6

Sheet 7	1	2	3	4	5	6	7	8	Final
(Switzerland) Marco Hösli	0	0	4	1	0	0	3	X	8
(Ontario) Jordan Chandler 🔨	1	1	0	0	0	1	0	X	3

Sheet 8	1	2	3	4	5	6	7	8	Final
(Switzerland) Kim Schwaller	0	1	0	0	1	1	0	X	3
(Ontario) Jason Camm 🔨	2	0	2	1	0	0	1	X	6

==== Draw 2 ====
Thursday, September 10, 9:00 pm

Sheet 1	1	2	3	4	5	6	7	8	Final
(United States) Daniel Casper 🔨	2	1	3	0	1	X	X	X	7
(Ontario) Jordan Keon	0	0	0	1	0	X	X	X	1

Sheet 2	1	2	3	4	5	6	7	8	Final
(Ontario) Nathan Young	0	0	0	0	1	1	0	X	2
(United States) Caden Hebert 🔨	1	0	1	1	0	0	1	X	4

Sheet 3	1	2	3	4	5	6	7	8	Final
(Alberta) Brendan Bottcher 🔨	0	0	3	0	4	0	2	X	9
(New Brunswick) Colten Steele	0	0	0	2	0	1	0	X	3

Sheet 4	1	2	3	4	5	6	7	8	Final
(Manitoba) John Epping 🔨	1	0	2	0	2	1	0	1	7
(United States) Scott Dunnam	0	2	0	1	0	0	2	0	5

Sheet 5	1	2	3	4	5	6	7	8	Final
(Manitoba) Jordon McDonald 🔨	1	0	1	0	2	4	X	X	8
(Ontario) Daniel Hocevar	0	1	0	1	0	0	X	X	2

Sheet 6	1	2	3	4	5	6	7	8	Final
(United States) John Shuster	2	0	2	0	2	2	X	X	8
(Nova Scotia) Mark Kean 🔨	0	1	0	1	0	0	X	X	2

Sheet 7	1	2	3	4	5	6	7	8	Final
(Scotland) Kyle Waddell	2	0	2	0	5	0	X	X	9
(Ontario) Evan MacDougall 🔨	0	2	0	1	0	0	X	X	3

Sheet 8	1	2	3	4	5	6	7	8	Final
(Scotland) Orrin Carson	1	1	0	3	1	1	X	X	7
(Manitoba) Team Lott 🔨	0	0	1	0	0	0	X	X	1

==== Draw 4 ====
Friday, September 11, 11:30 am

Sheet 1	1	2	3	4	5	6	7	8	9	Final
(Italy) Joël Retornaz	0	2	1	0	0	3	0	0	1	7
(Ontario) Mike Fournier 🔨	1	0	0	2	0	0	1	2	0	6

Sheet 2	1	2	3	4	5	6	7	8	Final
(Manitoba) John Epping 🔨	0	1	0	1	0	1	0	1	4
(Manitoba) Jordon McDonald	0	0	1	0	2	0	2	0	5

Sheet 3	1	2	3	4	5	6	7	8	Final
(Italy) Team Spiller	0	2	0	0	0	1	0	X	3
(Czech Republic) Lukáš Klíma 🔨	2	0	0	2	1	0	2	X	7

Sheet 4	1	2	3	4	5	6	7	8	Final
(Switzerland) Marco Hösli 🔨	0	2	0	3	0	0	3	X	8
(Ontario) Jason Camm	0	0	1	0	1	1	0	X	3

Sheet 5	1	2	3	4	5	6	7	8	Final
(Manitoba) Matt Dunstone	0	2	0	1	1	0	2	X	6
(Ontario) Sam Mooibroek 🔨	1	0	1	0	0	1	0	X	3

Sheet 7	1	2	3	4	5	6	7	8	Final
(United States) Daniel Casper 🔨	0	0	3	3	0	0	0	0	6
(United States) Caden Hebert	2	1	0	0	3	0	1	1	8

==== Draw 5 ====
Friday, September 11, 3:00 pm

Sheet 1	1	2	3	4	5	6	7	8	Final
(Ontario) Ryan Thompson-Brown 🔨	0	1	0	0	0	X	X	X	1
(Italy) Alberto Zisa	1	0	2	2	4	X	X	X	9

Sheet 3	1	2	3	4	5	6	7	8	Final
(Scotland) Kyle Waddell	0	1	0	1	1	1	2	1	7
(United States) John Shuster 🔨	1	0	2	0	0	0	0	0	3

Sheet 4	1	2	3	4	5	6	7	8	Final
(Alberta) Brendan Bottcher 🔨	1	0	0	2	0	0	2	X	5
(Scotland) Orrin Carson	0	1	0	0	0	2	0	X	3

==== Draw 6 ====
Friday, September 11, 6:00 pm

Sheet 1	1	2	3	4	5	6	7	8	Final
(United States) Scott Dunnam 🔨	1	1	0	1	0	0	0	1	4
(Ontario) Daniel Hocevar	0	0	3	0	1	1	1	0	6

Sheet 3	1	2	3	4	5	6	7	8	Final
(Ontario) Jordan Chandler	0	0	1	0	0	1	1	0	3
(Switzerland) Kim Schwaller 🔨	0	0	0	2	1	0	0	1	4

Sheet 4	1	2	3	4	5	6	7	8	Final
(Ontario) Kibo Mulima	0	0	0	1	0	0	1	X	2
(Quebec) Félix Asselin 🔨	0	0	2	0	2	1	0	X	5

Sheet 5	1	2	3	4	5	6	7	8	Final
(Ontario) Jordan Keon 🔨	0	1	0	0	0	X	X	X	1
(Ontario) Nathan Young	2	0	1	1	3	X	X	X	7

Sheet 6	1	2	3	4	5	6	7	8	Final
(Ontario) Jayden King 🔨	2	0	2	0	5	X	X	X	9
(Ontario) Scott Howard	0	0	0	1	0	X	X	X	1

Sheet 7	1	2	3	4	5	6	7	8	Final
(New Brunswick) Colten Steele 🔨	1	0	2	1	0	2	0	1	7
(Manitoba) Team Lott	0	2	0	0	1	0	2	0	5

Sheet 8	1	2	3	4	5	6	7	8	Final
(Ontario) Evan MacDougall	1	2	0	1	0	1	0	0	5
(Nova Scotia) Mark Kean 🔨	0	0	3	0	2	0	3	2	10

==== Draw 7 ====
Friday, September 11, 9:30 pm

Sheet 4	1	2	3	4	5	6	7	8	9	Final
(Manitoba) Matt Dunstone	0	0	1	0	1	0	1	1	0	4
(Italy) Joël Retornaz 🔨	0	2	0	2	0	0	0	0	1	5

Sheet 5	1	2	3	4	5	6	7	8	Final
(Scotland) Kyle Waddell 🔨	0	2	0	1	0	0	1	0	4
(Alberta) Brendan Bottcher	3	0	1	0	0	1	0	0	5

Sheet 6	1	2	3	4	5	6	7	8	Final
(United States) Caden Hebert 🔨	0	2	0	3	0	0	2	0	7
(Manitoba) Jordon McDonald	0	0	2	0	4	1	0	1	8

Sheet 8	1	2	3	4	5	6	7	8	Final
(Czech Republic) Lukáš Klíma	0	2	0	1	0	0	0	X	3
(Switzerland) Marco Hösli 🔨	2	0	1	0	0	2	0	X	5

==== Draw 8 ====
Saturday, September 12, 8:30 am

Sheet 1	1	2	3	4	5	6	7	8	9	Final
(United States) John Shuster 🔨	1	0	1	0	0	1	0	2	0	5
(Ontario) Jayden King	0	1	0	1	2	0	1	0	1	6

Sheet 2	1	2	3	4	5	6	7	8	Final
(Ontario) Mike Fournier	0	2	0	0	2	0	2	X	6
(Nova Scotia) Mark Kean 🔨	2	0	2	1	0	3	0	X	8

Sheet 3	1	2	3	4	5	6	7	8	Final
(Manitoba) John Epping 🔨	2	0	2	0	2	0	0	2	8
(Quebec) Félix Asselin	0	1	0	2	0	2	0	0	5

Sheet 4	1	2	3	4	5	6	7	8	Final
(United States) Daniel Casper 🔨	2	1	0	3	0	X	X	X	6
(Switzerland) Kim Schwaller	0	0	1	0	1	X	X	X	2

Sheet 5	1	2	3	4	5	6	7	8	9	Final
(Scotland) Orrin Carson	0	1	0	1	0	0	2	1	0	5
(Italy) Alberto Zisa 🔨	2	0	2	0	0	1	0	0	1	6

Sheet 6	1	2	3	4	5	6	7	8	Final
(Ontario) Sam Mooibroek	0	0	2	0	2	3	X	X	7
(New Brunswick) Colten Steele 🔨	0	1	0	1	0	0	X	X	2

Sheet 7	1	2	3	4	5	6	7	8	Final
(Ontario) Jason Camm 🔨	2	1	0	4	0	X	X	X	7
(Ontario) Nathan Young	0	0	1	0	1	X	X	X	2

Sheet 8	1	2	3	4	5	6	7	8	9	Final
(Italy) Team Spiller	0	0	2	0	3	1	0	0	1	7
(Ontario) Daniel Hocevar 🔨	1	1	0	1	0	0	1	2	0	6

==== Draw 9 ====
Saturday, September 12, 11:30 am

Sheet 2	1	2	3	4	5	6	7	8	Final
(Ontario) Kibo Mulima 🔨	2	0	1	1	0	1	3	X	8
(Ontario) Jordan Chandler	0	2	0	0	2	0	0	X	4

Sheet 7	1	2	3	4	5	6	7	8	Final
(Ontario) Ryan Thompson-Brown	0	1	0	1	0	0	X	X	2
(Ontario) Scott Howard 🔨	1	0	3	0	0	5	X	X	9

==== Draw 10 ====
Saturday, September 12, 3:00 pm

Sheet 2	1	2	3	4	5	6	7	8	Final
(Scotland) Kyle Waddell	0	0	3	0	2	0	1	X	6
(Ontario) Jason Camm 🔨	0	1	0	1	0	0	0	X	2

Sheet 3	1	2	3	4	5	6	7	8	Final
(Nova Scotia) Mark Kean	0	2	0	2	0	3	0	3	10
(Ontario) Sam Mooibroek 🔨	2	0	1	0	2	0	2	0	7

Sheet 5	1	2	3	4	5	6	7	8	Final
(Czech Republic) Lukáš Klíma 🔨	0	1	2	0	3	0	2	X	8
(Ontario) Jayden King	0	0	0	1	0	3	0	X	4

Sheet 6	1	2	3	4	5	6	7	8	Final
(Manitoba) John Epping	0	1	0	2	0	1	0	X	4
(United States) Daniel Casper 🔨	2	0	2	0	2	0	2	X	8

Sheet 7	1	2	3	4	5	6	7	8	Final
(Manitoba) Matt Dunstone	2	0	2	0	2	0	1	X	7
(Italy) Team Spiller 🔨	0	1	0	1	0	3	0	X	5

Sheet 8	1	2	3	4	5	6	7	8	Final
(United States) Caden Hebert 🔨	2	1	0	2	0	4	X	X	9
(Italy) Alberto Zisa	0	0	2	0	1	0	X	X	3

==== Draw 11 ====
Saturday, September 12, 6:00 pm

Sheet 2	1	2	3	4	5	6	7	8	Final
(Quebec) Félix Asselin 🔨	1	0	1	0	0	3	0	1	6
(Switzerland) Kim Schwaller	0	2	0	1	1	0	1	0	5

Sheet 6	1	2	3	4	5	6	7	8	Final
(Italy) Joël Retornaz 🔨	1	0	1	0	2	0	0	X	4
(Switzerland) Marco Hösli	0	3	0	2	0	1	2	X	8

Sheet 7	1	2	3	4	5	6	7	8	Final
(Manitoba) Jordon McDonald	0	2	0	0	1	0	0	0	3
(Alberta) Brendan Bottcher 🔨	1	0	1	0	0	2	2	1	7

Sheet 8	1	2	3	4	5	6	7	8	Final
(Ontario) Mike Fournier	0	1	0	0	3	0	2	0	6
(New Brunswick) Colten Steele 🔨	2	0	2	1	0	2	0	3	10

==== Draw 12 ====
Saturday, September 12, 9:30 pm

Sheet 1	1	2	3	4	5	6	7	8	Final
(Ontario) Evan MacDougall	0	0	2	1	0	2	0	1	6
(Manitoba) Team Lott 🔨	2	0	0	0	2	0	4	0	8

Sheet 5	1	2	3	4	5	6	7	8	Final
(Ontario) Jason Camm	0	0	2	0	1	0	X	X	3
(Ontario) Scott Howard 🔨	3	1	0	0	0	4	X	X	8

Sheet 8	1	2	3	4	5	6	7	8	Final
(Ontario) Jordan Keon	0	3	0	0	0	0	X	X	3
(United States) Scott Dunnam 🔨	3	0	1	1	3	2	X	X	10

==== Draw 13 ====
Sunday, September 13, 8:30 am

Sheet 1	1	2	3	4	5	6	7	8	Final
(Italy) Team Spiller	0	2	0	0	0	2	0	X	4
(Ontario) Kibo Mulima 🔨	0	0	2	0	1	0	4	X	7

Sheet 2	1	2	3	4	5	6	7	8	Final
(United States) Caden Hebert	0	0	2	3	0	1	0	1	7
(Czech Republic) Lukáš Klíma 🔨	2	1	0	0	1	0	1	0	5

Sheet 4	1	2	3	4	5	6	7	8	Final
(Manitoba) Jordon McDonald 🔨	0	1	0	2	0	0	3	X	6
(Nova Scotia) Mark Kean	0	0	1	0	1	0	0	X	2

Sheet 5	1	2	3	4	5	6	7	8	Final
(Italy) Joël Retornaz	0	0	2	0	0	X	X	X	2
(United States) Daniel Casper 🔨	1	1	0	4	4	X	X	X	10

Sheet 6	1	2	3	4	5	6	7	8	9	Final
(Scotland) Kyle Waddell 🔨	2	0	0	1	0	1	1	0	1	6
(Manitoba) Matt Dunstone	0	1	0	0	3	0	0	1	0	5

Sheet 7	1	2	3	4	5	6	7	8	Final
(Scotland) Orrin Carson	0	1	1	0	2	1	0	0	5
(United States) John Shuster 🔨	2	0	0	2	0	0	0	3	7

==== Draw 14 ====
Sunday, September 13, 11:30 am

Sheet 1	1	2	3	4	5	6	7	8	Final
(Manitoba) John Epping	1	0	1	0	2	0	1	X	5
(New Brunswick) Colten Steele 🔨	0	2	0	0	0	0	0	X	2

Sheet 2	1	2	3	4	5	6	7	8	Final
(Ontario) Jayden King	4	0	0	2	3	X	X	X	9
(Manitoba) Team Lott 🔨	0	1	2	0	0	X	X	X	3

Sheet 6	1	2	3	4	5	6	7	8	9	Final
(Ontario) Nathan Young	3	0	1	0	1	0	0	0	1	6
(Ontario) Daniel Hocevar 🔨	0	1	0	1	0	2	0	1	0	5

Sheet 7	1	2	3	4	5	6	7	8	9	Final
(Italy) Alberto Zisa 🔨	1	0	1	0	0	3	0	1	0	6
(United States) Scott Dunnam	0	1	0	0	2	0	3	0	1	7

Sheet 8	1	2	3	4	5	6	7	8	Final
(Ontario) Sam Mooibroek 🔨	1	1	0	0	1	0	0	X	3
(Quebec) Félix Asselin	0	0	2	0	0	2	2	X	6

==== Draw 15 ====
Sunday, September 13, 3:00 pm

Sheet 2	1	2	3	4	5	6	7	8	Final
(Manitoba) Matt Dunstone 🔨	2	0	1	0	2	0	1	X	6
(Quebec) Félix Asselin	0	1	0	1	0	1	0	X	3

Sheet 4	1	2	3	4	5	6	7	8	Final
(Ontario) Scott Howard 🔨	0	3	0	0	1	0	X	X	4
(Italy) Team Spiller	3	0	0	4	0	2	X	X	9

Sheet 5	1	2	3	4	5	6	7	8	9	Final
(Scotland) Kyle Waddell 🔨	1	0	0	2	0	2	1	0	1	7
(Manitoba) Jordon McDonald	0	0	2	0	1	0	0	3	0	6

Sheet 6	1	2	3	4	5	6	7	8	Final
(Nova Scotia) Mark Kean 🔨	2	0	1	0	0	1	0	0	4
(United States) John Shuster	0	1	0	2	1	0	2	3	9

Sheet 7	1	2	3	4	5	6	7	8	Final
(United States) Caden Hebert	1	0	0	0	0	1	X	X	2
(United States) Daniel Casper 🔨	0	1	1	2	2	0	X	X	6

Sheet 8	1	2	3	4	5	6	7	8	Final
(United States) Scott Dunnam	0	1	0	2	0	3	1	X	7
(Ontario) Jayden King 🔨	1	0	1	0	1	0	0	X	3

==== Draw 16 ====
Sunday, September 13, 6:00 pm

Sheet 3	1	2	3	4	5	6	7	8	9	Final
(Italy) Joël Retornaz 🔨	2	0	3	0	3	0	0	0	2	10
(Ontario) Nathan Young	0	2	0	1	0	3	1	1	0	8

Sheet 4	1	2	3	4	5	6	7	8	Final
(Czech Republic) Lukáš Klíma 🔨	0	0	3	0	2	0	0	X	5
(Manitoba) John Epping	2	1	0	2	0	2	1	X	8

==== Draw 17 ====
Sunday, September 13, 9:30 pm

Sheet 3	1	2	3	4	5	6	7	8	Final
(United States) John Shuster	0	1	1	2	0	0	2	X	6
(Manitoba) Matt Dunstone 🔨	2	0	0	0	0	1	0	X	3

Sheet 4	1	2	3	4	5	6	7	8	Final
(United States) Scott Dunnam	0	0	2	0	0	1	0	X	3
(Manitoba) Jordon McDonald 🔨	1	0	0	2	0	0	3	X	6

Sheet 6	1	2	3	4	5	6	7	8	9	Final
(Italy) Team Spiller 🔨	1	0	0	1	0	1	0	2	0	5
(United States) Caden Hebert	0	2	0	0	1	0	2	0	1	6

Sheet 7	1	2	3	4	5	6	7	8	Final
(Manitoba) John Epping	0	0	0	2	0	1	0	0	3
(Italy) Joël Retornaz 🔨	1	0	0	0	0	0	2	1	4

=== Playoffs ===
Quarterfinals
Q1	(Switzerland) Marco Hösli	5
Q8	(Manitoba) Jordon McDonald	8
Q4	(Scotland) Kyle Waddell	4
Q5	(United States) Caden Hebert	8
Q3	(United States) Daniel Casper	4
Q6	(United States) John Shuster	1
Q2	(Alberta) Brendan Bottcher	8
Q7	(Italy) Joël Retornaz	7

Semifinals
Q8	(Manitoba) Jordon McDonald	5
Q5	(United States) Caden Hebert	3
Q3	(United States) Daniel Casper	4
Q2	(Alberta) Brendan Bottcher	3

Final
Q8	(Manitoba) Jordon McDonald	5
Q3	(United States) Daniel Casper	9

==== Quarterfinals ====
Monday, September 14, 8:30 am

Sheet 1	1	2	3	4	5	6	7	8	Final
(Scotland) Kyle Waddell 🔨	0	1	0	2	0	0	1	X	4
(United States) Caden Hebert	2	0	1	0	4	1	0	X	8

Sheet 2	1	2	3	4	5	6	7	8	Final
(United States) Daniel Casper 🔨	0	1	0	1	0	1	0	1	4
(United States) John Shuster	0	0	1	0	0	0	0	0	1

Sheet 3	1	2	3	4	5	6	7	8	Final
(Alberta) Brendan Bottcher 🔨	2	0	2	0	2	2	0	0	8
(Italy) Joël Retornaz	0	2	0	2	0	0	2	1	7

Sheet 4	1	2	3	4	5	6	7	8	9	Final
(Switzerland) Marco Hösli 🔨	2	0	0	1	0	0	1	1	0	5
(Manitoba) Jordon McDonald	0	2	1	0	2	0	0	0	3	8

==== Semifinals ====
Monday, September 14, 12:00 pm

Sheet 6	1	2	3	4	5	6	7	8	Final
(United States) Daniel Casper	0	0	0	2	0	1	0	1	4
(Alberta) Brendan Bottcher 🔨	1	0	0	0	1	0	1	0	3

Sheet 7	1	2	3	4	5	6	7	8	Final
(Manitoba) Jordon McDonald 🔨	0	2	0	1	0	1	0	1	5
(United States) Caden Hebert	1	0	1	0	0	0	1	0	3

==== Final ====
Monday, September 14, 3:30 pm

Sheet 3	1	2	3	4	5	6	7	8	Final
(Manitoba) Jordon McDonald	0	2	0	2	0	1	0	0	5
(United States) Daniel Casper 🔨	3	0	0	0	1	0	2	3	9

== Women ==
=== Teams ===
The teams are listed as follows:

Skip	Third	Second	Lead	Alternate	Locale
Emma Acres	Ashley Dezura	Jenna Declercq	Julia DeKlein		Ottawa, Ontario
Christina Black	Jill Brothers	Marlee Powers	Lindsey Burgess		Halifax, Nova Scotia
Kira Brunton	Jamie Smith	Mia Toner (Note: Kendra Lilly missed the tournament, with Jamie Smith moving to third, and Mia Toner sparing for Team Brunton as second.)	Lauren Rajala		Sudbury, Ontario
Sarah Daniels	Abby Ackland	Calissa Daly	Dayna Demmans		New Westminster, British Columbia
Hollie Duncan (Fourth)	Megan Balsdon (Skip) (Note: Megan Balsdon skipped Team Duncan.)	Rachelle Strybosch	Tess Guyatt		Woodstock, Ontario
Fay Henderson	Lisa Davie	Laura Watt	Katie McMillan		Stirling, Scotland
Carly Howard	Grace Holyoke	Emma Artichuk	Alice Holyoke		Toronto, Ontario
Corrie Hürlimann	Marina Lörtscher	Celine Schwizgebel	Isabel Einspieler		Zug, Switzerland
Brooklyn Ideson	Lauren Evason	Aila Thompson	Clara Dissanayake		London, Ontario
Danielle Inglis	Jo-Ann Rizzo	Geri-Lynn Ramsay	Joanne Tarvit		Whitby, Ontario
Grace Lloyd	Evelyn Robert	Michaela Robert	Rachel Steele		Whitby, Ontario
Kayla MacMillan	Val Sweeting	Lindsay Dubue	Lauren Lenentine		Victoria, British Columbia
Sherry Middaugh	Kelly Middaugh	Emily Middaugh	Megan Smith		Niagara Falls, Ontario
Alina Pätz	Selina Witschonke	Stefanie Berset	Renée Frigo		Geneva, Switzerland
Chelsea Principi	Lauren Peskett	Brenda Chapman	Keira McLaughlin		Niagara Falls, Ontario
Kim Rhyme	Stephanie Senneker	Libby Brundage	Clare Moores		(United States) Minneapolis, Minnesota
Breanna Rozon	Chrissy Cadorin	Celeste Gauthier	Jillian Page		Brantford, Ontario
Xenia Schwaller	Selina Gafner	Fabienne Rieder	Selina Rychiger		Zurich, Switzerland
Kayla Skrlik	Myla Plett	Sarah Koltun	Samantha Fisher		Calgary, Alberta
Miyu Ueno	Yui Ueno	– (Note: Team Ueno played with three players.)	Asuka Kanai	Kirsten Wall (Note: Kirsten Wall spared for Team Ueno in two games while Yui Ueno fell ill.)	Karuizawa, Japan
Katelyn Wasylkiw	Sarah Bailey	Stephanie Thompson	Lauren Wasylkiw		Unionville, Ontario
Giulia Zardini Lacedelli	Elena Mathis	Marta Lo Deserto	Rachele Scalesse		Cortina d'Ampezzo, Italy

=== Knockout Brackets ===
==== A Event ====
First Knockout	Qualifier 1
(Switzerland) Xenia Schwaller	6
(Ontario) Chelsea Principi	7	(Ontario) Chelsea Principi	3
(Ontario) Kira Brunton	3	(Switzerland) Xenia Schwaller	8
(Italy) Giulia Zardini Lacedelli	7	(Ontario) Sherry Middaugh	3
(Ontario) Breanna Rozon	5	(Italy) Giulia Zardini Lacedelli	4
(Nova Scotia) Christina Black	4	(Ontario) Sherry Middaugh	6
(Ontario) Sherry Middaugh	5

First Knockout	Qualifier 2
(Switzerland) Alina Pätz	4
(Alberta) Kayla Skrlik	9	(Alberta) Kayla Skrlik	5
(British Columbia) Sarah Daniels	2	(Alberta) Kayla Skrlik	9
(Scotland) Fay Henderson	9	(Scotland) Fay Henderson	5
(Ontario) Danielle Inglis	5	(Scotland) Fay Henderson	7
(Switzerland) Corrie Hürlimann	5	(Ontario) Katelyn Wasylkiw	4
(Ontario) Katelyn Wasylkiw	6

First Knockout				Qualifier 3
(Japan) Miyu Ueno	7
(Ontario) Emma Acres	1	(Japan) Miyu Ueno	L
(Ontario) Team Duncan	8	(Ontario) Team Duncan	W
(United States) Kim Rhyme	3			(Ontario) Team Duncan	3
(Ontario) Grace Lloyd	4			(Ontario) Carly Howard	5
(Ontario) Carly Howard	7	(Ontario) Carly Howard	5
(British Columbia) Kayla MacMillan	12	(British Columbia) Kayla MacMillan	3
(Ontario) Brooklyn Ideson	4

==== B Event ====
Second Knockout	Qualifier 4
(British Columbia) Sarah Daniels	2
(Japan) Miyu Ueno	9
(Japan) Miyu Ueno	8
(Switzerland) Corrie Hürlimann	10
(British Columbia) Kayla MacMillan	6
(Ontario) Danielle Inglis	3	(Switzerland) Corrie Hürlimann	7
(Switzerland) Corrie Hürlimann	7	(Switzerland) Corrie Hürlimann	2
(Ontario) Sherry Middaugh	9

Second Knockout	Qualifier 5
(Ontario) Chelsea Principi	6
(Ontario) Emma Acres	2	(United States) Kim Rhyme	2
(United States) Kim Rhyme	7	(Ontario) Chelsea Principi	5
(Ontario) Grace Lloyd	8
(Italy) Giulia Zardini Lacedelli	4
(Ontario) Grace Lloyd	5	(Ontario) Grace Lloyd	7
(Ontario) Brooklyn Ideson	2	(Ontario) Grace Lloyd	4
(Scotland) Fay Henderson	3

Second Knockout	Qualifier 6
(Ontario) Kira Brunton	4
(Switzerland) Alina Pätz	6
(Switzerland) Alina Pätz	8
(Ontario) Katelyn Wasylkiw	1
(Ontario) Katelyn Wasylkiw	6
(Ontario) Breanna Rozon	4	(Nova Scotia) Christina Black	5
(Nova Scotia) Christina Black	6	(Switzerland) Alina Pätz	5
(Ontario) Team Duncan	2

==== C Event ====
Third Knockout	Qualifier 7
(Switzerland) Corrie Hürlimann	8
(Ontario) Breanna Rozon	3	(Ontario) Kira Brunton	5
(Ontario) Kira Brunton	8	(Switzerland) Corrie Hürlimann	8
(Nova Scotia) Christina Black	2
(Ontario) Team Duncan	3
(Ontario) Danielle Inglis	4	(Nova Scotia) Christina Black	5
(Nova Scotia) Christina Black	8

Third Knockout	Qualifier 8
(Ontario) Katelyn Wasylkiw	3
(Ontario) Emma Acres	5	(Ontario) Brooklyn Ideson	6
(Ontario) Brooklyn Ideson	6	(Ontario) Brooklyn Ideson	1
(Japan) Miyu Ueno	11
(Japan) Miyu Ueno	8
(British Columbia) Sarah Daniels	3	(British Columbia) Kayla MacMillan	7
(British Columbia) Kayla MacMillan	5	(Japan) Miyu Ueno	4
(Italy) Giulia Zardini Lacedelli	6
(Scotland) Fay Henderson	1
(Italy) Giulia Zardini Lacedelli	7
(Ontario) Chelsea Principi	4
(United States) Kim Rhyme	5	(Italy) Giulia Zardini Lacedelli	9
(Italy) Giulia Zardini Lacedelli	8

=== Knockout Results ===
All draw times are listed in Eastern Time (UTC−04:00).

==== Draw 3 ====
Friday, September 11, 8:30 am

Sheet 1	1	2	3	4	5	6	7	8	Final
(Ontario) Chelsea Principi 🔨	0	2	0	0	2	0	3	X	7
(Ontario) Kira Brunton	0	0	1	1	0	1	0	X	3

Sheet 2	1	2	3	4	5	6	7	8	Final
(Italy) Giulia Zardini Lacedelli	2	0	0	0	2	0	0	3	7
(Ontario) Breanna Rozon 🔨	0	2	0	0	0	2	1	0	5

Sheet 3	1	2	3	4	5	6	7	8	Final
(Nova Scotia) Christina Black 🔨	0	1	0	1	1	1	0	0	4
(Ontario) Sherry Middaugh	0	0	0	0	0	0	4	1	5

Sheet 4	1	2	3	4	5	6	7	8	Final
(Alberta) Kayla Skrlik	0	2	0	4	3	0	X	X	9
(British Columbia) Sarah Daniels 🔨	0	0	1	0	0	1	X	X	2

Sheet 5	1	2	3	4	5	6	7	8	9	Final
(Switzerland) Corrie Hürlimann	0	1	0	2	0	1	0	1	0	5
(Ontario) Katelyn Wasylkiw 🔨	1	0	2	0	1	0	1	0	1	6

Sheet 6	1	2	3	4	5	6	7	8	Final
(Scotland) Fay Henderson 🔨	1	0	3	2	0	2	1	X	9
(Ontario) Danielle Inglis	0	2	0	0	3	0	0	X	5

Sheet 7	1	2	3	4	5	6	7	8	Final
(Japan) Miyu Ueno 🔨	1	1	1	3	0	1	X	X	7
(Ontario) Emma Acres	0	0	0	0	1	0	X	X	1

Sheet 8	1	2	3	4	5	6	7	8	Final
(Ontario) Team Duncan 🔨	4	0	0	2	1	1	X	X	8
(United States) Kim Rhyme	0	2	1	0	0	0	X	X	3

==== Draw 4 ====
Friday, September 11, 11:30 am

Sheet 6	1	2	3	4	5	6	7	8	Final
(British Columbia) Kayla MacMillan	0	4	0	0	5	3	X	X	12
(Ontario) Brooklyn Ideson 🔨	1	0	2	1	0	0	X	X	4

Sheet 8	1	2	3	4	5	6	7	8	Final
(Ontario) Grace Lloyd	0	0	2	0	2	0	0	X	3
(Ontario) Carly Howard 🔨	1	0	0	4	0	1	1	X	7

==== Draw 5 ====
Friday, September 11, 3:00 pm

Sheet 2	Final
(Japan) Miyu Ueno	L
(Ontario) Team Duncan	W

Sheet 5	1	2	3	4	5	6	7	8	Final
(Switzerland) Alina Pätz	1	0	1	0	2	0	0	0	4
(Alberta) Kayla Skrlik 🔨	0	1	0	1	0	0	0	3	5

Sheet 6	1	2	3	4	5	6	7	8	Final
(Switzerland) Xenia Schwaller 🔨	2	1	0	0	1	0	2	X	6
(Ontario) Chelsea Principi	0	0	0	2	0	1	0	X	3

Sheet 7	1	2	3	4	5	6	7	8	Final
(Scotland) Fay Henderson	1	2	0	1	0	2	0	1	7
(Ontario) Katelyn Wasylkiw 🔨	0	0	1	0	2	0	1	0	4

Sheet 8	1	2	3	4	5	6	7	8	Final
(Italy) Giulia Zardini Lacedelli	0	1	0	1	0	1	0	1	4
(Ontario) Sherry Middaugh 🔨	1	0	3	0	1	0	1	0	6

==== Draw 6 ====
Friday, September 11, 6:00 pm

Sheet 2	1	2	3	4	5	6	7	8	Final
(Ontario) Carly Howard	0	0	1	0	3	0	0	1	5
(British Columbia) Kayla MacMillan 🔨	0	0	0	1	0	1	1	0	3

==== Draw 7 ====
Friday, September 11, 9:30 pm

Sheet 1	1	2	3	4	5	6	7	8	Final
(Ontario) Grace Lloyd	2	1	0	0	0	0	2	X	5
(Ontario) Brooklyn Ideson 🔨	0	0	0	2	0	0	0	X	2

Sheet 2	1	2	3	4	5	6	7	8	Final
(Ontario) Danielle Inglis	0	2	0	1	0	0	0	X	3
(Switzerland) Corrie Hürlimann 🔨	1	0	1	0	0	2	3	X	7

Sheet 3	1	2	3	4	5	6	7	8	Final
(Ontario) Emma Acres	0	0	1	0	1	0	0	X	2
(United States) Kim Rhyme 🔨	1	1	0	2	0	2	1	X	7

Sheet 7	1	2	3	4	5	6	7	8	Final
(Ontario) Breanna Rozon	3	0	0	1	0	0	0	X	4
(Nova Scotia) Christina Black 🔨	0	2	1	0	2	0	1	X	6

==== Draw 9 ====
Saturday, September 12, 11:30 am

Sheet 1	1	2	3	4	5	6	7	8	Final
(Ontario) Katelyn Wasylkiw 🔨	1	0	1	1	0	1	0	2	6
(Nova Scotia) Christina Black	0	2	0	0	3	0	0	0	5

Sheet 3	1	2	3	4	5	6	7	8	Final
(British Columbia) Kayla MacMillan	0	4	0	1	1	0	0	0	6
(Switzerland) Corrie Hürlimann 🔨	2	0	2	0	0	2	0	1	7

Sheet 4	1	2	3	4	5	6	7	8	Final
(Italy) Giulia Zardini Lacedelli 🔨	2	0	0	2	0	0	0	0	4
(Ontario) Grace Lloyd	0	1	2	0	1	1	0	2	7

Sheet 5	1	2	3	4	5	6	7	8	Final
(Ontario) Chelsea Principi	0	3	0	1	1	0	1	X	6
(United States) Kim Rhyme 🔨	0	0	1	0	0	1	0	X	2

Sheet 6	1	2	3	4	5	6	7	8	Final
(Ontario) Kira Brunton	0	1	0	0	1	0	2	0	4
(Switzerland) Alina Pätz 🔨	0	0	2	1	0	2	0	1	6

Sheet 8	1	2	3	4	5	6	7	8	Final
(British Columbia) Sarah Daniels	0	0	0	0	0	2	0	X	2
(Japan) Miyu Ueno 🔨	0	1	1	2	3	0	2	X	9

==== Draw 10 ====
Saturday, September 12, 3:00 pm

Sheet 1	1	2	3	4	5	6	7	8	Final
(British Columbia) Sarah Daniels	0	0	1	0	1	1	0	X	3
(British Columbia) Kayla MacMillan 🔨	1	0	0	2	0	0	2	X	5

Sheet 4	1	2	3	4	5	6	7	8	Final
(Ontario) Emma Acres 🔨	1	1	2	0	0	0	1	0	5
(Ontario) Brooklyn Ideson	0	0	0	1	1	2	0	2	6

==== Draw 11 ====
Saturday, September 12, 6:00 pm

Sheet 1	1	2	3	4	5	6	7	8	Final
(United States) Kim Rhyme 🔨	2	0	1	0	1	0	1	X	5
(Italy) Giulia Zardini Lacedelli	0	2	0	3	0	3	0	X	8

Sheet 3	1	2	3	4	5	6	7	8	Final
(Alberta) Kayla Skrlik 🔨	2	0	0	2	4	0	1	X	9
(Scotland) Fay Henderson	0	2	1	0	0	2	0	X	5

Sheet 4	1	2	3	4	5	6	7	8	Final
(Ontario) Team Duncan	0	0	0	0	2	0	1	X	3
(Ontario) Carly Howard 🔨	0	0	0	3	0	2	0	X	5

Sheet 5	1	2	3	4	5	6	7	8	Final
(Switzerland) Xenia Schwaller	0	2	0	3	0	3	X	X	8
(Ontario) Sherry Middaugh 🔨	1	0	1	0	1	0	X	X	3

==== Draw 12 ====
Saturday, September 12, 9:30 pm

Sheet 2	1	2	3	4	5	6	7	8	Final
(Switzerland) Alina Pätz 🔨	2	0	0	2	0	4	X	X	8
(Ontario) Katelyn Wasylkiw	0	1	0	0	0	0	X	X	1

Sheet 3	1	2	3	4	5	6	7	8	Final
(Ontario) Breanna Rozon 🔨	2	0	0	1	0	X	X	X	3
(Ontario) Kira Brunton	0	3	2	0	3	X	X	X	8

Sheet 4	1	2	3	4	5	6	7	8	Final
(Ontario) Danielle Inglis	0	1	0	2	0	1	0	X	4
(Nova Scotia) Christina Black 🔨	1	0	2	0	3	0	2	X	8

Sheet 6	1	2	3	4	5	6	7	8	9	Final
(Japan) Miyu Ueno	0	3	1	0	2	2	0	0	0	8
(Switzerland) Corrie Hürlimann 🔨	3	0	0	2	0	0	2	1	2	10

Sheet 7	1	2	3	4	5	6	7	8	Final
(Ontario) Chelsea Principi	0	0	0	4	0	1	0	0	5
(Ontario) Grace Lloyd 🔨	0	1	2	0	2	0	1	2	8

==== Draw 13 ====
Sunday, September 13, 8:30 am

Sheet 3	1	2	3	4	5	6	7	8	Final
(Ontario) Katelyn Wasylkiw	1	0	1	0	0	0	1	X	3
(Ontario) Brooklyn Ideson 🔨	0	2	0	2	1	1	0	X	6

Sheet 8	1	2	3	4	5	6	7	8	9	Final
(Japan) Miyu Ueno	0	1	0	0	3	0	0	3	1	8
(British Columbia) Kayla MacMillan 🔨	1	0	0	3	0	2	1	0	0	7

==== Draw 14 ====
Sunday, September 13, 11:30 am

Sheet 3	1	2	3	4	5	6	7	8	Final
(Switzerland) Alina Pätz 🔨	0	2	0	1	1	0	0	1	5
(Ontario) Team Duncan	0	0	1	0	0	1	0	0	2

Sheet 4	1	2	3	4	5	6	7	8	Final
(Switzerland) Corrie Hürlimann	0	1	1	0	0	0	X	X	2
(Ontario) Sherry Middaugh 🔨	1	0	0	4	1	3	X	X	9

Sheet 5	1	2	3	4	5	6	7	8	Final
(Ontario) Grace Lloyd	1	1	0	0	0	1	0	1	4
(Scotland) Fay Henderson 🔨	0	0	0	1	0	0	2	0	3

==== Draw 15 ====
Sunday, September 13, 3:00 pm

Sheet 3	1	2	3	4	5	6	7	8	Final
(Ontario) Chelsea Principi	0	0	2	0	1	1	0	X	4
(Italy) Giulia Zardini Lacedelli 🔨	0	4	0	3	0	0	2	X	9

==== Draw 16 ====
Sunday, September 13, 6:00 pm

Sheet 2	1	2	3	4	5	6	7	8	Final
(Ontario) Team Duncan	0	1	0	0	0	1	0	1	3
(Nova Scotia) Christina Black 🔨	1	0	1	0	1	0	2	0	5

Sheet 5	1	2	3	4	5	6	7	8	Final
(Ontario) Brooklyn Ideson	0	0	0	1	0	0	X	X	1
(Japan) Miyu Ueno 🔨	2	1	1	0	1	6	X	X	11

Sheet 6	1	2	3	4	5	6	7	8	Final
(Scotland) Fay Henderson	0	0	1	0	0	0	X	X	1
(Italy) Giulia Zardini Lacedelli 🔨	1	1	0	1	3	1	X	X	7

Sheet 7	1	2	3	4	5	6	7	8	Final
(Switzerland) Corrie Hürlimann	0	2	0	2	0	2	2	X	8
(Ontario) Kira Brunton 🔨	1	0	2	0	2	0	0	X	5

==== Draw 17 ====
Sunday, September 13, 9:30 pm

Sheet 2	1	2	3	4	5	6	7	8	Final
(Japan) Miyu Ueno	0	1	0	0	1	0	2	X	4
(Italy) Giulia Zardini Lacedelli 🔨	2	0	1	1	0	2	0	X	6

Sheet 5	1	2	3	4	5	6	7	8	Final
(Switzerland) Corrie Hürlimann	0	0	1	0	3	4	X	X	8
(Nova Scotia) Christina Black 🔨	0	1	0	1	0	0	X	X	2

=== Playoffs ===
Quarterfinals
Q1	(Switzerland) Xenia Schwaller	6
Q8	(Italy) Giulia Zardini Lacedelli	4
Q4	(Ontario) Sherry Middaugh	9
Q5	(Ontario) Grace Lloyd	5
Q3	(Ontario) Carly Howard	4
Q6	(Switzerland) Alina Pätz	6
Q2	(Alberta) Kayla Skrlik	2
Q7	(Switzerland) Corrie Hürlimann	7

Semifinals
Q1	(Switzerland) Xenia Schwaller	7
Q4	(Ontario) Sherry Middaugh	1
Q6	(Switzerland) Alina Pätz	6
Q7	(Switzerland) Corrie Hürlimann	5

Final
Q1	(Switzerland) Xenia Schwaller	4
Q6	(Switzerland) Alina Pätz	6

==== Quarterfinals ====
Monday, September 14, 8:30 am

Sheet 5	1	2	3	4	5	6	7	8	Final
(Ontario) Carly Howard 🔨	0	0	1	0	2	0	1	0	4
(Switzerland) Alina Pätz	0	2	0	2	0	1	0	1	6

Sheet 6	1	2	3	4	5	6	7	8	9	Final
(Switzerland) Xenia Schwaller 🔨	1	0	0	1	0	0	2	0	2	6
(Italy) Giulia Zardini Lacedelli	0	0	2	0	1	0	0	1	0	4

Sheet 7	1	2	3	4	5	6	7	8	Final
(Alberta) Kayla Skrlik 🔨	1	0	0	0	1	0	X	X	2
(Switzerland) Corrie Hürlimann	0	4	1	1	0	1	X	X	7

Sheet 8	1	2	3	4	5	6	7	8	Final
(Ontario) Sherry Middaugh 🔨	3	0	3	0	2	0	1	X	9
(Ontario) Grace Lloyd	0	2	0	2	0	1	0	X	5

==== Semifinals ====
Monday, September 14, 12:00 pm

Sheet 3	1	2	3	4	5	6	7	8	Final
(Switzerland) Xenia Schwaller 🔨	2	0	0	0	0	2	3	X	7
(Ontario) Sherry Middaugh	0	1	0	0	0	0	0	X	1

Sheet 4	1	2	3	4	5	6	7	8	Final
(Switzerland) Alina Pätz 🔨	2	1	0	1	1	1	0	0	6
(Switzerland) Corrie Hürlimann	0	0	1	0	0	0	2	2	5

==== Final ====
Monday, September 14, 3:30 pm

Sheet 6	1	2	3	4	5	6	7	8	Final
(Switzerland) Xenia Schwaller 🔨	2	0	1	0	0	1	0	0	4
(Switzerland) Alina Pätz	0	1	0	2	0	0	2	1	6
