= Stu Sells Oakville Tankard =

World Curling Tour event

- Established: 2004
- Host city: Oakville, Ontario
- Arena: Oakville Curling Club
- Men's purse: $48,000
- Women's purse: $36,000

Current champions (2026)
- Men: (United States) Daniel Casper
- Women: (Switzerland) Alina Pätz

Current edition
- 2026 Stu Sells Oakville Tankard

Location in Canada

The Stu Sells Oakville Tankard (also known as the OCT Championships) is an annual bonspiel on the men's and women's Ontario Curling Tour. Except for in 2020, the event has been held at the Oakville Curling Club in Oakville, Ontario. The event was formerly just on the Ontario Curling Tour, but it was promoted as a World Curling Tour event in 2013 when Stu Sells became the sponsor.

As of 2023 the purse for the event was $30,000 for the men's and women's events. A Tier 2 men's event was added in 2016 (but was subsequently discontinued), with a total purse of $16,000.

In 2020 the event was held at the KW Granite Club in Waterloo, Ontario, due to the COVID-19 pandemic delaying the opening of the Oakville Curling Club. That year, the men's event was halted before the playoffs, as one player was notified through a COVID Alert tracing app that he had come in contact with someone who had the virus. The women's playoff was held, however, as the men's and women's teams did not play at the same time.

The event was postponed and eventually cancelled in 2022 to avoid conflicting with the 2022 PointsBet Invitational.

== Past champions ==
=== Men ===
==== Tier 1 ====
Year	Winning team	Runner up team	Purse (CAD)	Host site
2004	(Ontario) Tim Morrison, Jason Boyce, Dennis Noakes, Keavin Noakes	(Ontario) Wayne Middaugh, Glenn Howard, Scott Bailey, Scott Howard	$8,000	Penetanguishene
2005	(Ontario) Glenn Howard, Richard Hart, Brent Laing, Craig Savill	(Ontario) Howard Rajala, Paul Madden, Dan Cheney, Barry Conrad	$18,000	Kingston
2006	(Ontario) Jason Young, Mark Bice, Steve Bice, Jeff Wilson	(Ontario) Todd Brandwood, Scott Banner, Bill Buchanan, Brad Hiscock	$13,000	Cambridge
2007	(Ontario) Joe Frans, Craig Kochan, Paul Madgett, Derek Abbotts	(Ontario) Dale Matchett	$21,000	Oakville
2008	(Ontario) Dale Matchett, Ryan Werenich, Jeff Gorda, Shawn Kaufman	(Ontario) Chris Gardner, Derek Abbotts, Brad Kidd, Sean Harrison	$27,500	Oakville
2010	(Ontario) Mathew Camm, David Mathers, Fraser Reid, Andrew Hamilton	(Ontario) Mark Kean, Chris Van Huyse, Patrick Janssen, Tim March	$20,450	Oakville
2011	(Ontario) Robert Rumfeldt, Adam Spencer, Scott Hodgson, Greg Robinson	(Ontario) Brent Ross, Jake Higgs, Jonathan Beuk, Bill Buchanan	$24,000	Oakville
2012	(Ontario) Brad Jacobs, Ryan Fry, E. J. Harnden, Ryan Harnden	(Ontario) Mark Kean, Travis Fanset, Patrick Janssen, Tim March	$23,400	Oakville
2013	(Ontario) Brad Jacobs, Ryan Fry, E. J. Harnden, Ryan Harnden	(Alberta) Kevin Koe, Pat Simmons, Carter Rycroft, Nolan Thiessen	$34,000	Oakville
2014	(Manitoba) Mike McEwen, B. J. Neufeld, Matt Wozniak, Denni Neufeld	(Ontario) John Epping, Travis Fanset, Patrick Janssen, Tim March	$30,000	Oakville
2015	(Newfoundland and Labrador) Brad Gushue, Mark Nichols, Brett Gallant, Geoff Walker	(Manitoba) Reid Carruthers, Braeden Moskowy, Derek Samagalski, Colin Hodgson	$27,200	Oakville
2016	(Sweden) Niklas Edin, Oskar Eriksson, Rasmus Wranå, Christoffer Sundgren	(British Columbia) Jim Cotter, John Morris, Tyrel Griffith, Rick Sawatsky	$27,000	Oakville
2017	(Scotland) Bruce Mouat, Grant Hardie, Bobby Lammie, Hammy McMillan Jr.	(South Korea) Kim Chang-min, Seong Se-hyeon, Oh Eun-soo, Lee Ki-bok	$28,000	Oakville
2018	(Switzerland) Yannick Schwaller, Michael Brunner, Romano Meier, Marcel Käufeler	(Ontario) Wayne Tuck Jr., Kevin Flewwelling, Chad Allen, Sean Harrison	$25,000	Oakville
2019	(Ontario) John Epping, Ryan Fry, Mathew Camm, Brent Laing	(Saskatchewan) Matt Dunstone, Braeden Moskowy, Catlin Schneider, Dustin Kidby	$36,000	Oakville
2020	Tournament halted before playoffs		$10,000	Waterloo
2021	(Scotland) Bruce Mouat, Grant Hardie, Bobby Lammie, Hammy McMillan Jr.	(Ontario) Brad Jacobs, Marc Kennedy, E. J. Harnden, Ryan Harnden	$35,000	Oakville
2023	(Scotland) Bruce Mouat, Grant Hardie, Bobby Lammie, Hammy McMillan Jr.	(Scotland) Ross Whyte, Robin Brydone, Duncan McFadzean, Euan Kyle	$30,000	Oakville
2024	(Switzerland) Benoît Schwarz-van Berkel (Fourth), Yannick Schwaller (Skip), Sven Michel, Pablo Lachat	(Germany) Marc Muskatewitz, Benny Kapp, Felix Messenzehl, Johannes Scheuerl	$30,000	Oakville
2025	(Scotland) Ross Whyte, Robin Brydone, Craig Waddell, Euan Kyle	(United States) Korey Dropkin, Thomas Howell, Andrew Stopera, Mark Fenner	$30,000	Oakville
2026	(United States) Daniel Casper, Luc Violette, Ben Richardson, Aidan Oldenburg	(Manitoba) Jordon McDonald, Jacques Gauthier, Elias Huminicki, Cameron Olafson	$48,000	Oakville

==== Tier 2 ====
Year	Winning team	Runner up team	Purse (CAD)
2016	(Netherlands) Jaap van Dorp, Wouter Gosgens, Laurens Hoekman, Carlo Glasbergen	(Ontario) Tanner Horgan, Jacob Horgan, Nicholas Bissonnette, Maxime Blais	$16,000

=== Women ===
Year	Winning team	Runner up team	Purse (CAD)
2004	(Ontario) Sherry Middaugh, Kirsten Wall, Andrea Lawes, Sherri Cordina	(Ontario) Cheryl McBain, Jennifer Harvey, Jenn Day, Trish Scharf, Lesle Cafferty	
2005	(Ontario) Rachel Homan, Emma Miskew, Alison Kreviazuk, Nicole Johnston	(Ontario) Anne Dunn, Lindy Marchuk, Gloria Campbell, Fran Todd	$13,000
2006	(Ontario) Rachel Homan, Emma Miskew, Alison Kreviazuk, Nicole Johnston	(Ontario) Julie Hastings, Christy Trombley, Stacey Smith, Katrina Collins	$7,800
2007	(Ontario) Julie Reddick, Jo-Ann Rizzo, Lori Eddy, Stephanie Leachman	(United States) Patti Lank, Caitlin Maroldo, Jenn Ellard, Chrissy Haase	$10,500
2008	(Ontario) Julie Reddick, Jo-Ann Rizzo, Leigh Armstrong, Stephanie Leachman	(Ontario) Hollie Nicol, Danielle Inglis, Laura Hickey, Hilary McDermott	$23,200
2010	(Ontario) Julie Hastings, Christy Trombley, Stacey Smith, Katrina Collins	(Ontario) Kathy Brown, Janet Langevin, Abbie Darnley, Margaret Hewitt	$11,800
2011	(Ontario) Sherry Middaugh, Jo-Ann Rizzo, Lee Merklinger, Leigh Armstrong	(Ontario) Allison Nimik, Lori Eddy, Kimberly Tuck, Julie Columbus	$14,400
2012	(United States) Erika Brown, Debbie McCormick, Jessica Schultz, Ann Swisshelm	(Ontario) Sherry Middaugh, Jo-Ann Rizzo, Lee Merklinger, Leigh Armstrong	$15,600
2013	(Ontario) Sherry Middaugh, Jo-Ann Rizzo, Lee Merklinger, Leigh Armstrong	(Ontario) Cathy Auld, Janet Murphy, Stephanie Matheson, Melissa Foster	$24,000
2014	(Switzerland) Silvana Tirinzoni, Manuela Siegrist, Esther Neuenschwander, Marlene Albrecht	(Switzerland) Alina Pätz, Nadine Lehmann, Marisa Winkelhausen, Nicole Schwägli	$24,000
2015	(Ontario) Rachel Homan, Emma Miskew, Joanne Courtney, Lisa Weagle	(Switzerland) Alina Pätz, Nadine Lehmann, Marisa Winkelhausen, Nicole Schwägli	$30,400
2016	(Switzerland) Silvana Tirinzoni, Manuela Siegrist, Esther Neuenschwander, Marlene Albrecht	(Ontario) Allison Flaxey, Clancy Grandy, Lynn Kreviazuk, Morgan Court	$24,000
2017	(Switzerland) Silvana Tirinzoni, Manuela Siegrist, Esther Neuenschwander, Marlene Albrecht	(Ontario) Sherry Middaugh, Jo-Ann Rizzo, Lee Merklinger, Leigh Armstrong	$23,000
2018	(Manitoba) Kerri Einarson, Val Sweeting, Shannon Birchard, Briane Meilleur	(Switzerland) Alina Pätz (Fourth), Silvana Tirinzoni (Skip), Esther Neuenschwander, Melanie Barbezat	$25,000
2019	(Sweden) Anna Hasselborg, Sara McManus, Agnes Knochenhauer, Sofia Mabergs	(Russia) Anna Sidorova, Julia Portunova, Olga Kotelnikova, Julia Guzieva	$36,000
2020	(Manitoba) Jennifer Jones, Kaitlyn Lawes, Jocelyn Peterman, Lisa Weagle	(Ontario) Hollie Duncan, Megan Balsdon, Rachelle Strybosch, Tess Bobbie	$10,000
2021	(Ontario) Hollie Duncan, Megan Balsdon, Rachelle Strybosch, Tess Bobbie, Julie Tippin	(Northwest Territories) Jo-Ann Rizzo (Fourth), Sarah Koltun, Margot Flemming, Kerry Galusha (Skip)	$12,600
2023	(South Korea) Ha Seung-youn, Kim Hye-rin, Yang Tae-i, Kim Su-jin	(Scotland) Rebecca Morrison, Jennifer Dodds, Sophie Sinclair, Sophie Jackson, Gina Aitken	$30,000
2024	(Switzerland) Xenia Schwaller, Selina Gafner, Fabienne Rieder, Selina Rychiger	(Alberta) Kayla Skrlik, Margot Flemming, Ashton Skrlik, Geri-Lynn Ramsay	$30,000
2025	(South Korea) Ha Seung-youn, Kim Hye-rin, Yang Tae-i, Kim Su-jin, Park Seo-jin	(Japan) Momoha Tabata (Fourth), Miku Nihira (Skip), Sae Yamamoto, Mikoto Nakajima	$30,000
2026	(Switzerland) Alina Pätz, Selina Witschonke, Stefanie Berset, Renée Frigo	(Switzerland) Xenia Schwaller, Selina Gafner, Fabienne Rieder, Selina Rychiger	$36,000
