= 2025 Northern Ontario Men's Provincial Curling Championship =

Canadian provincial men's curling championship

- Host city: Thunder Bay, Ontario
- Arena: Port Arthur Curling Centre
- Dates: January 21–26
- Winner: Team Epping
- Curling club: Northern Credit Union CC, Sudbury
- Skip: John Epping
- Third: Jacob Horgan
- Second: Tanner Horgan
- Lead: Ian McMillan
- Finalist: Dylan Johnston

The 2025 Northern Ontario Men's Provincial Curling Championship, the men's provincial curling championship for Northern Ontario, was held from January 21 to 26 at the Port Arthur Curling Centre in Thunder Bay, Ontario. The winning John Epping rink represented Northern Ontario at the 2025 Montana's Brier, Canada's national men's curling championship in Kelowna, British Columbia. The event was held in conjunction with the 2025 Northern Ontario Women's Curling Championship, the provincial women's championship.

== Teams ==
The teams are listed as follows:

Skip	Third	Second	Lead	Coach	Club
Brian Adams Jr.	Colin Koivula	Mark Koivula	Joel Adams		Port Arthur CC, Thunder Bay
Trevor Bonot	Mike McCarville	Jordan Potts	Kurtis Byrd	Al Hackner	Fort William CC, Thunder Bay
Jeff Brown	Chris Bowman	Gavan Jamieson	Ben Alexander		North Bay GC, North Bay
John Epping	Jacob Horgan	Tanner Horgan	Ian McMillan		Northern Credit Union CC, Sudbury
Matthew Hunt	Kyle Sherlock	Jake Reid	Connor Simms		YNCU Curling Centre, Sault Ste. Marie
Dylan Johnston	Chris Briand	Jordan Potter	Brennan Wark		Fort William CC, Thunder Bay
Dustin Kroeker	Jonathon Ranger	Justin McGinnis	Dave Hamilton		Kenora CC, Kenora
Sandy MacEwan	Dustin Montpellier	Lee Toner	Luc Ouimet		Northern Credit Union CC, Sudbury
Brad Minogue	Ryan Sayer	Graehem Sayer	Ryan Forget		North Bay GC, North Bay
Frank Morissette	Pat Berezowski	Kris Leupen	Gary Champagne		Fort William CC, Thunder Bay
Chris Silver	Owen Riches	Brayden Sinclair	Travis Showalter		Fort William CC, Thunder Bay
Zack Warkentin	Tyler Stewart	Travis Potter	Jamie Childs		Fort William CC, Thunder Bay
Gary Weiss	Deron Surkan	Aaron Rogalski	Mark Beazley		Port Arthur CC, Thunder Bay

=== Map of teams ===
Northern Ontario Men's Curling Championship Teams

== Knockout Brackets ==
=== A Event ===
First Knockout	Qualifier 1
John Epping	9
Gary Weiss	3
Gary Weiss	8
Brad Minogue	7
John Epping	11
Dylan Johnston	4
Dylan Johnston	10
Matthew Hunt	8
Dylan Johnston	10
Brian Adams Jr.	6
Brian Adams Jr.	10
Dustin Kroeker	6
John Epping	10
Sandy MacEwan	2
Sandy MacEwan	10
Zack Warkentin	2
Chris Silver	9
Zack Warkentin	10
Sandy MacEwan	9
Trevor Bonot	6
Trevor Bonot	9
Jeff Brown	5
Frank Morissette	5
Jeff Brown	6

=== B Event ===
Second Knockout	Qualifier 2
Frank Morissette	2
Gary Weiss	10
Gary Weiss	3
Brian Adams Jr.	10
Chris Silver	7
Brian Adams Jr.	9
Brian Adams Jr.	8
Trevor Bonot	5
Brian Adams Jr.	4
Matthew Hunt	8	Dylan Johnston	5
Dustin Kroeker	9	Dustin Kroeker	4
Zack Warkentin	9
Zack Warkentin	2
Jeff Brown	8
Brad Minogue	5
Jeff Brown	7
Jeff Brown	6
Dylan Johnston	8
Sandy MacEwan	6
Dylan Johnston	8

=== C Event ===
Third Knockout	Qualifier 3
Brian Adams Jr.	7	Sandy MacEwan	7
Zack Warkentin	7	Zack Warkentin	9	Trevor Bonot	6
Brad Minogue	2	Frank Morissette	5	Zack Warkentin	3
Matthew Hunt	6	Frank Morissette	12	Trevor Bonot	7
Frank Morissette	7	Trevor Bonot	8
Jeff Brown	5	Chris Silver	7
Gary Weiss	8	Chris Silver	8
Chris Silver	9	Chris Silver	11
Dustin Kroeker	2

== Knockout Results ==
All draws are listed in Eastern Time (UTC−05:00).

=== Draw 1 ===
Tuesday, January 21, 7:30 pm

Sheet 3	1	2	3	4	5	6	7	8	9	10	Final
Gary Weiss 🔨	2	2	0	1	1	1	0	0	1	0	8
Brad Minogue	0	0	2	0	0	0	3	1	0	1	7

Sheet 4	1	2	3	4	5	6	7	8	9	10	11	Final
Dylan Johnston	0	2	0	0	0	4	0	1	1	0	2	10
Matthew Hunt 🔨	1	0	2	1	1	0	1	0	0	2	0	8

Sheet 5	1	2	3	4	5	6	7	8	9	10	Final
Chris Silver	0	0	0	4	0	3	1	1	0	0	9
Zack Warkentin 🔨	0	1	4	0	1	0	0	0	3	1	10

Sheet 6	1	2	3	4	5	6	7	8	9	10	Final
Brian Adams Jr. 🔨	0	2	1	0	4	0	3	0	X	X	10
Dustin Kroeker	0	0	0	2	0	1	0	3	X	X	6

Sheet 7	1	2	3	4	5	6	7	8	9	10	Final
Frank Morissette	0	0	2	0	1	0	1	0	1	X	5
Jeff Brown 🔨	1	1	0	1	0	2	0	1	0	X	6

=== Draw 2 ===
Wednesday, January 22, 11:30 am

Sheet 3	1	2	3	4	5	6	7	8	9	10	Final
Matthew Hunt 🔨	1	1	0	3	1	0	1	0	1	0	8
Dustin Kroeker	0	0	4	0	0	2	0	1	0	2	9

Sheet 4	1	2	3	4	5	6	7	8	9	10	Final
John Epping	1	1	1	0	2	0	3	1	X	X	9
Gary Weiss 🔨	0	0	0	2	0	1	0	0	X	X	3

Sheet 5	1	2	3	4	5	6	7	8	9	10	Final
Trevor Bonot 🔨	1	1	0	3	0	1	1	0	1	1	9
Jeff Brown	0	0	3	0	1	0	0	1	0	0	5

Sheet 6	1	2	3	4	5	6	7	8	9	10	Final
Sandy MacEwan	0	1	0	3	3	1	2	X	X	X	10
Zack Warkentin 🔨	0	0	2	0	0	0	0	X	X	X	2

Sheet 7	1	2	3	4	5	6	7	8	9	10	Final
Dylan Johnston	0	2	0	2	0	3	0	2	1	X	10
Brian Adams Jr. 🔨	0	0	2	0	3	0	1	0	0	X	6

=== Draw 4 ===
Wednesday, January 22, 8:30 pm

Sheet 3	1	2	3	4	5	6	7	8	9	10	Final
Chris Silver 🔨	2	1	2	0	0	1	0	0	1	0	7
Brian Adams Jr.	0	0	0	3	1	0	2	1	0	2	9

Sheet 4	1	2	3	4	5	6	7	8	9	10	Final
Dustin Kroeker 🔨	0	1	0	1	0	2	0	0	X	X	4
Zack Warkentin	0	0	2	0	3	0	3	1	X	X	9

Sheet 6	1	2	3	4	5	6	7	8	9	10	Final
Frank Morissette	0	1	0	0	1	0	X	X	X	X	2
Gary Weiss 🔨	3	0	0	3	0	4	X	X	X	X	10

Sheet 7	1	2	3	4	5	6	7	8	9	10	Final
Brad Minogue	0	0	0	0	1	0	2	1	1	0	5
Jeff Brown 🔨	1	1	1	2	0	1	0	0	0	1	7

=== Draw 5 ===
Thursday, January 23, 9:00 am

Sheet 5	1	2	3	4	5	6	7	8	9	10	Final
Matthew Hunt 🔨	1	0	0	2	0	2	1	0	0	0	6
Frank Morissette	0	1	1	0	1	0	0	1	3	0	7

=== Draw 6 ===
Thursday, January 23, 2:30 pm

Sheet 3	1	2	3	4	5	6	7	8	9	10	Final
Zack Warkentin	0	0	1	0	0	1	0	0	X	X	2
Jeff Brown 🔨	1	0	0	3	1	0	2	1	X	X	8

Sheet 4	1	2	3	4	5	6	7	8	9	10	Final
Sandy MacEwan 🔨	2	0	0	0	2	0	3	0	1	1	9
Trevor Bonot	0	0	0	1	0	2	0	3	0	0	6

Sheet 5	1	2	3	4	5	6	7	8	9	10	Final
Gary Weiss	0	1	0	0	2	0	X	X	X	X	3
Brian Adams Jr. 🔨	2	0	1	2	0	5	X	X	X	X	10

Sheet 6	1	2	3	4	5	6	7	8	9	10	Final
John Epping	0	2	4	2	0	3	X	X	X	X	11
Dylan Johnston 🔨	2	0	0	0	2	0	X	X	X	X	4

=== Draw 7 ===
Thursday, January 23, 7:30 pm

Sheet 3	1	2	3	4	5	6	7	8	9	10	Final
Chris Silver 🔨	1	1	0	2	1	0	2	2	X	X	9
Dustin Kroeker	0	0	1	0	0	1	0	0	X	X	2

Sheet 4	1	2	3	4	5	6	7	8	9	10	Final
Brad Minogue	0	0	1	0	1	0	0	0	X	X	2
Frank Morissette 🔨	0	2	0	2	0	3	1	4	X	X	12

=== Draw 8 ===
Friday, January 24, 9:30 am

Sheet 6	1	2	3	4	5	6	7	8	9	10	Final
Brian Adams Jr.	2	2	0	0	1	0	2	0	1	X	8
Trevor Bonot 🔨	0	0	1	0	0	2	0	2	0	X	5

=== Draw 9 ===
Friday, January 24, 2:00 pm

Sheet 3	1	2	3	4	5	6	7	8	9	10	Final
John Epping	0	0	0	4	0	3	3	X	X	X	10
Sandy MacEwan 🔨	0	1	1	0	0	0	0	X	X	X	2

Sheet 4	1	2	3	4	5	6	7	8	9	10	Final
Gary Weiss	0	2	0	2	0	0	1	0	3	0	8
Chris Silver 🔨	2	0	1	0	1	1	0	2	0	4	11

Sheet 6	1	2	3	4	5	6	7	8	9	10	Final
Jeff Brown 🔨	2	0	0	0	1	0	2	0	1	0	6
Dylan Johnston	0	2	1	1	0	2	0	1	0	1	8

Sheet 7	1	2	3	4	5	6	7	8	9	10	Final
Zack Warkentin 🔨	0	0	2	0	0	0	2	1	0	2	7
Frank Morissette	0	1	0	2	0	0	0	0	2	0	5

=== Draw 10 ===
Friday, January 24, 7:00 pm

Sheet 3	1	2	3	4	5	6	7	8	9	10	Final
Jeff Brown	0	0	0	2	0	1	0	2	0	X	5
Chris Silver 🔨	2	0	1	0	2	0	2	0	1	X	8

Sheet 5	1	2	3	4	5	6	7	8	9	10	Final
Brian Adams Jr. 🔨	0	0	0	0	1	0	2	0	1	0	4
Dylan Johnston	0	0	1	0	0	2	0	1	0	1	5

=== Draw 11 ===
Saturday, January 25, 9:30 am

Sheet 4	1	2	3	4	5	6	7	8	9	10	Final
Brian Adams Jr. 🔨	0	4	0	1	0	0	2	0	0	0	7
Zack Warkentin	0	0	2	0	1	1	0	0	2	3	9

Sheet 7	1	2	3	4	5	6	7	8	9	10	11	Final
Trevor Bonot 🔨	0	0	0	1	1	1	0	2	0	2	1	8
Chris Silver	0	1	2	0	0	0	2	0	2	0	0	7

=== Draw 12 ===
Saturday, January 25, 2:00 pm

Sheet 4	1	2	3	4	5	6	7	8	9	10	Final
Sandy MacEwan 🔨	1	0	2	1	0	1	0	0	1	0	6
Dylan Johnston	0	2	0	0	3	0	0	2	0	1	8

Sheet 6	1	2	3	4	5	6	7	8	9	10	Final
Zack Warkentin 🔨	0	0	0	0	1	0	0	2	0	X	3
Trevor Bonot	0	0	1	2	0	0	1	0	3	X	7

=== Draw 13 ===
Saturday, January 25, 7:00 pm

Sheet 5	1	2	3	4	5	6	7	8	9	10	Final
Sandy MacEwan	0	1	0	1	0	0	3	0	0	2	7
Trevor Bonot 🔨	0	0	2	0	0	2	0	2	0	0	6

== Playoffs ==
Semifinal			Final
			A	John Epping	10
B	Dylan Johnston	9	B	Dylan Johnston	2
C	Sandy MacEwan	5

=== Semifinal ===
Sunday, January 26, 9:00 am

Sheet 4	1	2	3	4	5	6	7	8	9	10	Final
Dylan Johnston 🔨	1	0	0	1	2	0	2	0	3	X	9
Sandy MacEwan	0	2	1	0	0	1	0	1	0	X	5

=== Final ===
Sunday, January 26, 5:30 pm

Sheet 4	1	2	3	4	5	6	7	8	9	10	Final
John Epping 🔨	1	2	2	2	0	3	X	X	X	X	10
Dylan Johnston	0	0	0	0	2	0	X	X	X	X	2

2025 Northern Ontario Men's Provincial Curling Championship

John Epping
1st Northern Ontario Provincial Championship title
