= 2006 Canadian Mixed Curling Championship =

Curling Championship

- Host city: Whitehorse, Yukon
- Arena: Whitehorse Curling Club
- Dates: November 19–26, 2005
- Winner: Ontario
- Curling club: Oakville Curling Club, Oakville, Ontario
- Skip: John Epping
- Third: Julie Reddick
- Second: Scott Foster
- Lead: Leigh Armstrong
- Finalist: Manitoba (David Hamblin)

The 2006 Canadian Mixed Curling Championship was held November 19–26, 2005 at the Whitehorse Curling Club (Mount McIntyre Recreation Centre) in Whitehorse, Yukon. Team Ontario, consisting of skip John Epping, third Julie Reddick, second Scott Foster and lead Leigh Armstrong, won the championship after being seeded 3rd following the round robin. Ontario defeated Manitoba (consisting of David Hamblin, Kristen Williamson, Ross Derksen and Kendra Green) 11–3 in the final.

== Teams ==
Locale	Skip	Third	Second	Lead	Club
Alberta	Les Steuber	Heather Kuntz	Lorne Reed	Sheila Ashton	Spruce Grove Curling Club, Spruce Grove
British Columbia	Tom Buchy	Lori Buchy	Dave Toffolo	Robyn Toffolo	Kimberley Curling Club, Kimberley
Manitoba	David Hamblin	Kristen Williamson	Ross Derksen	Kendra Green	Morris Curling Club, Morris
New Brunswick	Terry Odishaw	Becky Atkinson	Kevin Boyle	Jane Boyle	Capital Winter Club, Fredericton & Thistle St. Andrews Curling Club, Saint John
Newfoundland and Labrador	Gary Oke	Marcie Brown	Scott Davidge	Donna Davis	Corner Brook Curling Club, Corner Brook, Gander Curling Club, Gander & Labrador City Curling Club, Labrador City
Northern Ontario	Mike Assad	Angela Lee	Ben Mikkelsen	Kari MacLean	Fort William Curling Club, Thunder Bay
Nova Scotia	Brian Rafuse	Laura Fultz	David Slauenwhite	Alexis Sinclair	Bridgewater Curling Club, Bridgewater
Ontario	John Epping	Julie Reddick	Scott Foster	Leigh Armstrong	Oakville Curling Club, Oakville
Prince Edward Island	Larry Dewar	Tammy Dewar	Ross Petrie	Gail Greene	Montague Curling Club, Montague
Quebec	Dwayne Fowler	Nathalie Audet	Marco Berthelot	Janique Berthelot	Club de curling Boucherville, Boucherville & Club de curling Laval-sur-le-Lac, Laval-sur-le-Lac
Saskatchewan	Brian Wempe	Amy Jurgens	Kim Jurgens	Laura Jurgens	Humboldt Curling Club, Humboldt
Northwest Territories/Yukon	Jamie Koe	Kerry Koe	Randy Turpin	Kelli Turpin	Yellowknife Curling Club, Yellowknife & Inuvik Curling Club, Inuvik

== Standings ==
Province	Skip	Wins	Losses
Manitoba	David Hamblin	9	2
Quebec	Dwayne Fowler	8	3
Ontario	John Epping	8	3
New Brunswick	Terry Odishaw	6	5
Northwest Territories/Yukon	Jamie Koe	6	5
British Columbia	Tom Buchy	6	5
Newfoundland and Labrador	Gary Oke	5	6
Alberta	Les Steuber	5	6
Nova Scotia	Brian Rafuse	5	6
Saskatchewan	Brian Wempe	3	8
Northern Ontario	Mike Assad	3	8
Prince Edward Island	Larry Dewar	2	9

== Results ==
=== Draw 1 ===
Sheet A	1	2	3	4	5	6	7	8	9	10	Final
Northern Ontario (Assad) 🔨	0	0	0	0	2	0	1	0	0	0	3
Saskatchewan (Wempe)	0	0	1	0	0	0	0	1	2	1	5

Sheet B	1	2	3	4	5	6	7	8	9	10	Final
Manitoba (Hamblin) 🔨	0	2	0	1	0	4	0	5	X	X	12
Prince Edward Island (Dewar)	0	0	1	0	1	0	1	0	X	X	3

Sheet C	1	2	3	4	5	6	7	8	9	10	11	Final
British Columbia (Buchy) 🔨	1	0	3	0	1	0	0	0	2	1	0	8
Northwest Territories/Yukon (Koe)	0	3	0	2	0	1	1	1	0	0	1	9

Sheet D	1	2	3	4	5	6	7	8	9	10	Final
Newfoundland and Labrador (Oke) 🔨	1	1	0	1	0	1	1	1	0	0	6
Nova Scotia (Rafuse)	0	0	3	0	2	0	0	0	0	2	7

Sheet E	1	2	3	4	5	6	7	8	9	10	11	Final
Quebec (Fowler) 🔨	2	0	1	0	0	0	1	0	2	0	1	7
Alberta (Steuber)	0	2	0	0	1	0	0	1	0	2	0	6

Sheet F	1	2	3	4	5	6	7	8	9	10	Final
Ontario (Epping) 🔨	1	0	0	1	0	0	0	2	0	1	5
New Brunswick (Odishaw)	0	2	0	0	0	1	1	0	2	0	6

=== Draw 2 ===
Sheet A	1	2	3	4	5	6	7	8	9	10	11	Final
New Brunswick (Odishaw) 🔨	2	0	2	0	0	2	0	0	2	0	0	8
Quebec (Fowler)	0	2	0	0	1	0	2	1	0	2	1	9

Sheet B	1	2	3	4	5	6	7	8	9	10	Final
Alberta (Steuber) 🔨	0	1	0	1	0	1	0	2	0	X	5
Newfoundland and Labrador (Oke)	0	0	1	0	3	0	0	0	4	X	8

Sheet C	1	2	3	4	5	6	7	8	9	10	Final
Nova Scotia (Rafuse) 🔨	0	2	0	2	0	0	0	1	0	X	5
British Columbia (Buchy)	2	0	1	0	1	2	1	0	3	X	10

Sheet D	1	2	3	4	5	6	7	8	9	10	Final
Northwest Territories/Yukon (Koe) 🔨	0	1	0	0	0	0	2	2	0	X	5
Manitoba (Hamblin)	0	0	0	4	0	1	0	0	3	X	8

Sheet E	1	2	3	4	5	6	7	8	9	10	Final
Ontario (Epping) 🔨	1	0	0	2	0	1	0	0	4	0	8
Northern Ontario (Assad)	0	3	1	0	1	0	1	1	0	2	9

Sheet F	1	2	3	4	5	6	7	8	9	10	Final
Prince Edward Island (Dewar) 🔨	1	1	1	0	0	2	0	0	0	1	6
Saskatchewan (Wempe)	0	0	0	0	1	0	1	1	2	0	5

=== Draw 3 ===
Sheet A	1	2	3	4	5	6	7	8	9	10	Final
Saskatchewan (Wempe) 🔨	0	2	0	3	0	1	0	1	0	X	7
Northwest Territories/Yukon (Koe)	0	0	1	0	1	0	0	0	2	X	4

Sheet B	1	2	3	4	5	6	7	8	9	10	Final
Northern Ontario (Assad) 🔨	1	0	1	0	3	1	0	3	0	X	9
Prince Edward Island (Dewar)	0	1	0	1	0	0	2	0	0	X	4

Sheet C	1	2	3	4	5	6	7	8	9	10	Final
Manitoba (Hamblin) 🔨	0	1	0	1	0	2	0	3	0	X	7
Nova Scotia (Rafuse)	0	0	1	0	1	0	1	0	1	X	4

Sheet D	1	2	3	4	5	6	7	8	9	10	Final
British Columbia (Buchy) 🔨	1	0	0	0	2	0	2	0	3	X	8
Alberta (Steuber)	0	1	0	0	0	3	0	1	0	X	5

Sheet E	1	2	3	4	5	6	7	8	9	10	Final
Newfoundland and Labrador (Oke) 🔨	0	2	1	0	3	2	2	X	X	X	10
New Brunswick (Odishaw)	0	0	0	1	0	0	0	X	X	X	1

Sheet F	1	2	3	4	5	6	7	8	9	10	Final
Quebec (Fowler) 🔨	1	0	0	1	1	0	1	2	X	X	6
Ontario (Epping)	0	0	1	0	0	0	0	0	X	X	1

=== Draw 4 ===
Sheet A	1	2	3	4	5	6	7	8	9	10	Final
Ontario (Epping) 🔨	4	0	0	4	1	X	X	X	X	X	9
Newfoundland and Labrador (Oke)	0	1	1	0	0	X	X	X	X	X	2

Sheet B	1	2	3	4	5	6	7	8	9	10	Final
New Brunswick (Odishaw) 🔨	5	1	0	2	0	0	1	X	X	X	9
British Columbia (Buchy)	0	0	1	0	0	1	0	X	X	X	2

Sheet C	1	2	3	4	5	6	7	8	9	10	Final
Alberta (Steuber) 🔨	0	1	1	1	0	0	2	0	0	1	6
Manitoba (Hamblin)	0	0	0	0	1	0	0	1	1	0	3

Sheet D	1	2	3	4	5	6	7	8	9	10	Final
Quebec (Fowler) 🔨	2	0	1	1	1	0	4	X	X	X	9
Northern Ontario (Assad)	0	1	0	0	0	2	0	X	X	X	3

Sheet E	1	2	3	4	5	6	7	8	9	10	Final
Nova Scotia (Rafuse) 🔨	3	0	0	0	2	1	0	1	0	2	9
Saskatchewan (Wempe)	0	2	1	1	0	0	1	0	3	0	8

Sheet F	1	2	3	4	5	6	7	8	9	10	Final
Northwest Territories/Yukon (Koe) 🔨	2	0	1	2	0	0	1	3	0	X	9
Prince Edward Island (Dewar)	0	2	0	0	0	2	0	0	0	X	4

=== Draw 5 ===
Sheet A	1	2	3	4	5	6	7	8	9	10	Final
Prince Edward Island (Dewar) 🔨	2	1	0	0	0	2	0	0	1	0	6
Nova Scotia (Rafuse)	0	0	2	1	1	0	2	1	0	1	8

Sheet B	1	2	3	4	5	6	7	8	9	10	Final
Saskatchewan (Wempe) 🔨	0	1	0	0	0	1	0	1	0	0	3
Alberta (Steuber)	0	0	0	2	1	0	1	0	0	1	5

Sheet C	1	2	3	4	5	6	7	8	9	10	Final
Northern Ontario (Assad) 🔨	0	0	0	0	2	0	1	1	1	0	5
Northwest Territories/Yukon (Koe)	0	2	0	0	0	2	0	0	0	2	6

Sheet D	1	2	3	4	5	6	7	8	9	10	Final
Manitoba (Hamblin) 🔨	0	2	0	1	0	1	1	0	1	X	6
New Brunswick (Odishaw)	0	0	1	0	1	0	0	1	0	X	3

Sheet E	1	2	3	4	5	6	7	8	9	10	Final
British Columbia (Buchy) 🔨	0	1	0	0	0	1	0	X	X	X	2
Ontario (Epping)	2	0	2	0	3	0	2	X	X	X	9

Sheet F	1	2	3	4	5	6	7	8	9	10	Final
Newfoundland and Labrador (Oke) 🔨	1	0	1	0	2	0	1	1	0	0	6
Quebec (Fowler)	0	3	0	1	0	1	0	0	0	2	7

=== Draw 6 ===
Sheet A	1	2	3	4	5	6	7	8	9	10	Final
Quebec (Fowler) 🔨	1	0	2	0	1	1	0	1	1	1	8
British Columbia (Buchy)	0	1	0	3	0	0	2	0	0	0	6

Sheet B	1	2	3	4	5	6	7	8	9	10	11	Final
Ontario (Epping) 🔨	0	1	0	0	2	0	1	0	2	0	1	7
Manitoba (Hamblin)	0	0	1	0	0	1	0	3	0	1	0	6

Sheet C	1	2	3	4	5	6	7	8	9	10	Final
Newfoundland and Labrador (Oke) 🔨	1	1	0	1	0	1	1	0	1	X	6
Northern Ontario (Assad)	0	0	1	0	0	0	0	1	0	X	2

Sheet D	1	2	3	4	5	6	7	8	9	10	Final
New Brunswick (Odishaw) 🔨	0	2	0	1	0	0	2	0	2	2	9
Saskatchewan (Wempe)	2	0	2	0	1	1	0	1	0	0	7

Sheet E	1	2	3	4	5	6	7	8	9	10	Final
Alberta (Steuber) 🔨	1	0	0	4	4	0	2	X	X	X	11
Prince Edward Island (Dewar)	0	0	1	0	0	2	0	X	X	X	3

Sheet F	1	2	3	4	5	6	7	8	9	10	Final
Nova Scotia (Rafuse) 🔨	2	1	0	1	0	3	0	3	0	X	10
Northwest Territories/Yukon (Koe)	0	0	2	0	2	0	2	0	1	X	7

=== Draw 7 ===
Sheet A	1	2	3	4	5	6	7	8	9	10	Final
Northwest Territories/Yukon (Koe) 🔨	1	1	0	4	1	0	1	X	X	X	8
Alberta (Steuber)	0	0	1	0	0	1	0	X	X	X	2

Sheet B	1	2	3	4	5	6	7	8	9	10	Final
Prince Edward Island (Dewar) 🔨	1	0	1	1	0	1	0	0	1	1	6
New Brunswick (Odishaw)	0	1	0	0	1	0	1	1	0	0	4

Sheet C	1	2	3	4	5	6	7	8	9	10	Final
Saskatchewan (Wempe) 🔨	1	0	0	1	0	0	X	X	X	X	2
Ontario (Epping)	0	2	1	0	3	3	X	X	X	X	9

Sheet D	1	2	3	4	5	6	7	8	9	10	Final
Northern Ontario (Assad) 🔨	0	2	0	2	0	1	0	1	0	1	7
Nova Scotia (Rafuse)	1	0	1	0	2	0	1	0	1	0	6

Sheet E	1	2	3	4	5	6	7	8	9	10	Final
Manitoba (Hamblin) 🔨	1	0	1	1	0	1	0	0	4	X	8
Quebec (Fowler)	0	3	0	0	1	0	1	0	0	X	5

Sheet F	1	2	3	4	5	6	7	8	9	10	Final
British Columbia (Buchy) 🔨	2	0	2	0	1	0	1	1	0	3	10
Newfoundland and Labrador (Oke)	0	2	0	0	0	2	0	0	2	0	6

=== Draw 8 ===
Sheet A	1	2	3	4	5	6	7	8	9	10	Final
Newfoundland and Labrador (Oke) 🔨	0	1	0	0	1	0	1	0	1	X	4
Manitoba (Hamblin)	0	0	0	2	0	2	0	2	0	X	6

Sheet B	1	2	3	4	5	6	7	8	9	10	Final
British Columbia (Buchy) 🔨	0	2	0	2	0	2	0	1	0	3	10
Northern Ontario (Assad)	0	0	2	0	1	0	1	0	2	0	6

Sheet C	1	2	3	4	5	6	7	8	9	10	Final
Quebec (Fowler) 🔨	0	2	0	0	1	0	0	0	1	0	4
Saskatchewan (Wempe)	0	0	1	1	0	0	0	2	0	1	5

Sheet D	1	2	3	4	5	6	7	8	9	10	Final
Ontario (Epping) 🔨	0	1	0	5	0	0	0	2	1	X	9
Prince Edward Island (Dewar)	1	0	2	0	1	0	0	0	0	X	4

Sheet E	1	2	3	4	5	6	7	8	9	10	Final
New Brunswick (Odishaw) 🔨	0	0	1	1	1	0	0	2	2	X	7
Northwest Territories/Yukon (Koe)	1	1	0	0	0	0	1	0	0	X	3

Sheet F	1	2	3	4	5	6	7	8	9	10	11	Final
Alberta (Steuber) 🔨	2	1	0	0	1	0	1	0	1	0	1	7
Nova Scotia (Rafuse)	0	0	2	1	0	1	0	0	0	2	0	6

=== Draw 9 ===
Sheet A	1	2	3	4	5	6	7	8	9	10	Final
Nova Scotia (Rafuse) 🔨	1	0	1	0	1	0	1	0	4	X	8
New Brunswick (Odishaw)	0	1	0	0	0	1	0	1	0	X	3

Sheet B	1	2	3	4	5	6	7	8	9	10	Final
Northwest Territories/Yukon (Koe) 🔨	0	0	3	0	0	1	0	0	2	X	6
Ontario (Epping)	1	1	0	0	3	0	1	1	0	X	7

Sheet C	1	2	3	4	5	6	7	8	9	10	Final
Prince Edward Island (Dewar) 🔨	2	1	0	0	0	0	0	1	X	X	4
Quebec (Fowler)	0	0	1	2	4	0	1	0	X	X	8

Sheet D	1	2	3	4	5	6	7	8	9	10	Final
Saskatchewan (Wempe) 🔨	0	0	1	0	2	0	2	0	0	0	5
Newfoundland and Labrador (Oke)	0	2	0	1	0	1	0	2	0	1	7

Sheet E	1	2	3	4	5	6	7	8	9	10	Final
Northern Ontario (Assad) 🔨	1	0	1	0	1	1	0	1	2	0	7
Alberta (Steuber)	0	1	0	3	0	0	4	0	0	1	9

Sheet F	1	2	3	4	5	6	7	8	9	10	Final
Manitoba (Hamblin) 🔨	2	1	0	1	2	3	X	X	X	X	9
British Columbia (Buchy)	0	0	2	0	0	0	X	X	X	X	2

=== Draw 10 ===
Sheet A	1	2	3	4	5	6	7	8	9	10	Final
Manitoba (Hamblin) 🔨	0	2	0	0	0	1	0	2	0	1	6
Northern Ontario (Assad)	0	0	0	0	1	0	3	0	1	0	5

Sheet B	1	2	3	4	5	6	7	8	9	10	11	Final
British Columbia (Buchy) 🔨	0	0	0	0	2	0	0	0	2	0	1	5
Saskatchewan (Wempe)	0	1	0	1	0	0	1	0	0	1	0	4

Sheet C	1	2	3	4	5	6	7	8	9	10	Final
New Brunswick (Odishaw) 🔨	0	0	2	1	1	0	2	0	2	X	8
Alberta (Steuber)	1	1	0	0	0	3	0	1	0	X	6

Sheet D	1	2	3	4	5	6	7	8	9	10	11	Final
Quebec (Fowler) 🔨	2	0	0	1	0	0	0	0	0	2	0	5
Northwest Territories/Yukon (Koe)	0	1	1	0	1	0	0	2	0	0	2	7

Sheet E	1	2	3	4	5	6	7	8	9	10	Final
Newfoundland and Labrador (Oke) 🔨	2	0	1	0	2	0	3	0	2	X	10
Prince Edward Island (Dewar)	0	1	0	1	0	2	0	2	0	X	6

Sheet F	1	2	3	4	5	6	7	8	9	10	Final
Ontario (Epping) 🔨	1	0	2	0	0	2	1	0	0	1	7
Nova Scotia (Rafuse)	0	2	0	1	1	0	0	0	1	0	5

=== Draw 11 ===
Sheet A	1	2	3	4	5	6	7	8	9	10	Final
Alberta (Steuber) 🔨	0	0	2	0	2	0	0	1	0	X	5
Ontario (Epping)	0	1	0	3	0	2	0	0	2	X	8

Sheet B	1	2	3	4	5	6	7	8	9	10	Final
Nova Scotia (Rafuse) 🔨	0	0	3	0	1	0	1	0	0	X	5
Quebec (Fowler)	1	1	0	1	0	1	0	3	2	X	9

Sheet C	1	2	3	4	5	6	7	8	9	10	Final
Northwest Territories/Yukon (Koe) 🔨	1	0	2	1	1	2	X	X	X	X	7
Newfoundland and Labrador (Oke)	0	1	0	0	0	0	X	X	X	X	1

Sheet D	1	2	3	4	5	6	7	8	9	10	Final
Prince Edward Island (Dewar) 🔨	0	1	1	1	0	0	0	2	0	0	5
British Columbia (Buchy)	1	0	0	0	1	1	0	0	1	2	6

Sheet E	1	2	3	4	5	6	7	8	9	10	Final
Saskatchewan (Wempe) 🔨	0	0	1	0	2	1	0	0	X	X	4
Manitoba (Hamblin)	1	2	0	2	0	0	2	1	X	X	8

Sheet F	1	2	3	4	5	6	7	8	9	10	Final
Northern Ontario (Assad) 🔨	1	0	0	0	0	1	0	1	0	X	3
New Brunswick (Odishaw)	0	0	2	1	1	0	1	0	0	X	5

== Playoffs ==
Semifinal			Final
			1	Manitoba	6
2	Quebec	6	3	Ontario	11
3	Ontario	11

=== Semifinal ===
Sheet C	1	2	3	4	5	6	7	8	9	10	Final
Quebec (Fowler) 🔨	1	0	0	1	0	2	0	2	0	X	6
Ontario (Epping)	0	4	1	0	3	0	1	0	2	X	11

=== Final ===
Sheet B	1	2	3	4	5	6	7	8	9	10	Final
Manitoba (Hamblin) 🔨	1	0	2	0	0	0	2	1	0	X	6
Ontario (Epping)	0	2	0	1	3	1	0	0	4	X	11
