= Leigh Armstrong =

Canadian curler

Leigh Armstrong (born November 2, 1982) is a Canadian retired curler, from Milton, Ontario. She missed out on qualification for the Sochi Olympics in 2014, with her team placing runner-up in the Canadian trials. From 2011 to 2015 she competed on the World Curling Tour, winning the 2011 North Grenville Women's Fall Curling Classic, 2012 Curlers Corner Autumn Gold Curling Classic, and 2017 US Open. She is a three-time winner (2008, 2011, 2013), and two-time runner-up (2012, 2017) in the OCT Championships. She was lead for Sherry Middaugh's team until it disbanded in 2018 In 2023, she was inducted in to the Milton Sports Hall of Fame.

Armstrong is a brand ambassador for The Dominion of Canada General Insurance Company.

She posed for the "provocative" Fire On Ice: 2007 Team Sponsorship calendar produced by Ana Arce in order to increase exposure and funding for women's curling.

== Achievements ==
- 2002 Ontario Junior (Mixed) - winner (lead)
- 1999, 2000 & 2002 Ontario Junior Curling Championships - winner (second) with Julie Reddick
- 2006 Canadian Mixed Curling Championship - winner (lead) w/ Oakville CC
- 2011 North Grenville Women's Fall Curling Classic winner (lead) w/ Coldwater & District CC
- 2012 Curlers Corner Autumn Gold Curling Classic
- 2013 Canadian Olympic Curling Trials - runner-up (lead) w/ Coldwater & District CC
- 2017 US Open winner (lead)
- OCT Championships
  - winner 2008, 2011, 2013
  - runner-up 2012, 2017
