= John Epping =

Canadian curler (born 1983)

- Curler
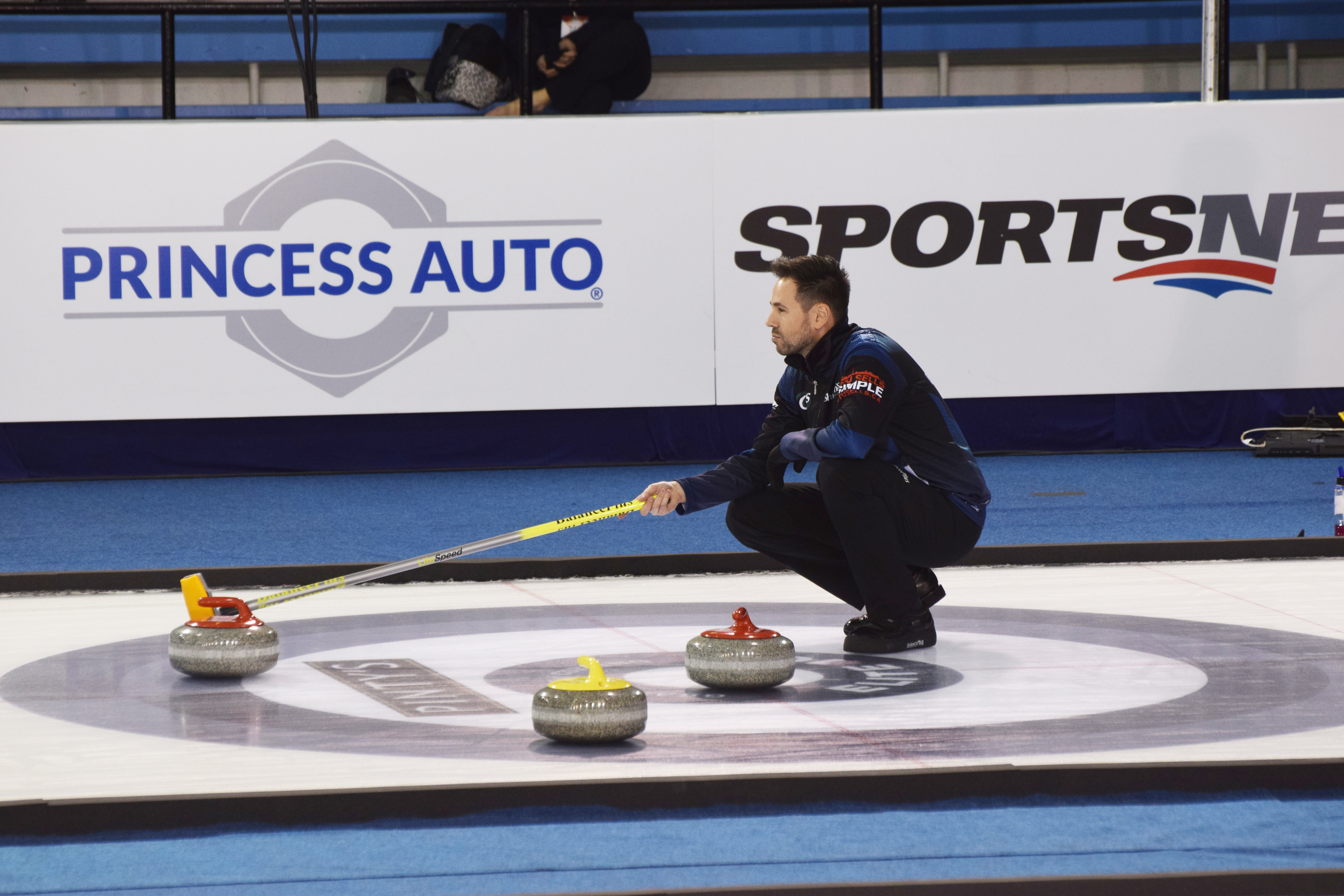
- Epping at the 2018 Elite 10 Grand Slam curling event in Winnipeg, Manitoba.
- Born: John Epping; March 20, 1983 (age 43); Peterborough, Ontario, Canada

Team
- Curling club: Leaside CC, East York, Toronto, ON
- Skip: John Epping
- Third: B. J. Neufeld
- Second: Ryan Wiebe
- Lead: Ian McMillan

Curling career
- Member Association: Ontario (2004–2024); Northern Ontario (2024–2026); Manitoba (2026–present)
- Brier: 4 (2018, 2020, 2021, 2025)
- Top CTRS ranking: 2nd (2019–20)
- Grand Slam victories: 4 (2008 National, 2012 Players', 2015 Canadian Open, 2018 Masters)
Medal record
Men's curling
Representing Ontario
Canadian Mixed Doubles Olympic Trials
Bronze medal – third place	2025 Liverpool
Tim Hortons Brier
Bronze medal – third place	2018 Regina

John Allan Epping (born March 20, 1983) is a Canadian curler from Toronto, Ontario. He currently skips his own team out of Manitoba, as well as coaches Team Xenia Schwaller from Switzerland.

== Career ==
=== Junior Men's ===
Born in Peterborough, Ontario, Epping was a top junior curler, having won the Ontario Junior championship in 2004. At the 2004 Canadian Junior Curling Championships, his team finished with an 8–4 record, just out of the playoffs. He won the 2006 Canadian Mixed Curling Championship with Julie Reddick, Scott Foster and Leigh Armstrong. He won the 2007 provincial mixed as well, but could not defend his national title.

=== Men's ===
After Juniors, Epping played third for Nick Rizzo until switching positions with Rizzo in 2006, and thus skipping the team. However, in 2007 he was recruited to play third for Olympic silver medallist Mike Harris. He'd only play one season for Harris before joining Wayne Middaugh's rink at second in 2008. With the Middaugh rink Epping won the 2008 National, his first Grand Slam victory. The team also played in the 2009 Canadian Olympic Curling Trials, where they finished with a 2–5 record. In 2010, Epping parted from Middaugh to form his own team.

Epping and teammates Scott Bailey, Scott Howard and David Mathers won the 2012 Players' Championship, Epping's second Grand Slam title of his career, and his first as skip. This win helped him accrue enough CTRS points to qualify for a direct spot at the 2013 Canadian Olympic Curling Trials. At the Trials, his rink (which replaced Howard with Collin Mitchell) won just one game, and finished last. Following the season, Epping formed a new team with Travis Fanset, Pat Janssen and Tim March. Mat Camm replaced Fanset in 2015.

Early on in the 2014–15 curling season, the Epping rink won the Gord Carroll Curling Classic Tour event. In that season's slams, the team made it to the semifinals of the 2014 Masters, but missed the playoffs at The National, the Canadian Open and the 2015 Elite 10. At the 2015 Ontario Tankard, Epping's team recorded an 8–2 record through the round robin, but lost to Mark Kean in the final. Fanset was replaced by Mat Camm on the team before the 2015 Players' Championship at the end of the season, where they lost in the semi-final.

At the 2016 Ontario Tankard, Epping and his rink again finished the round robin with an 8–2 record, but lost again in the final, this time to Glenn Howard.

Epping played in the 2017 Canadian Olympic Curling Trials, but again had a disappointing tournament, finishing with just a 2–6 record. He also competed in the 2018 Canadian Mixed Doubles Curling Olympic Trials with Sherry Middaugh, who replaced his usual mixed doubles partner Lisa Weagle, who had qualified in the team event with Rachel Homan. Epping and Middaugh finished the round robin with a 3–5 record and did not make it to the round of 8. Later in the season Epping would win his first ever provincial championship, finally defeating Glenn Howard in the final of the 2018 Ontario Tankard. Thus, the 2018 Tim Hortons Brier would be Epping's first Brier appearance. There, he led Team Ontario to a 9–2 record after pool play, good enough for second place going into the playoffs. However, they would lose both of their playoff games, settling for third place overall. After the season, the Epping team replaced its front-end with veteran curlers Brent Laing and Craig Savill.

Team Epping won the 2018 Masters, his fourth grand slam title, completing a career Grand Slam for Epping by winning all four "majors". Thanks to their success during the 2018–19 season, they qualified for the 2019 Tim Hortons Brier Wild Card game, despite losing in the final of the 2019 Ontario Tankard. In the Wild Card game, they lost to the Brendan Bottcher rink 8–4, missing out on playing in the Brier.

Ryan Fry joined the Epping team at third for the 2019–20 season, with Camm and Laing moving to second and lead and Savill leaving the team. They had a strong start to the year, winning both the Stu Sells Oakville Tankard and the 2019 AMJ Campbell Shorty Jenkins Classic. They had a semifinal finish at the Masters, the first Grand Slam of the season. They missed the playoffs at the next two slams, the Tour Challenge and the National after going 1–3 at both. Team Epping posted a 6–2 record en route to winning the 2019 Canada Cup in Leduc, Alberta. This win qualified them to represent Team Canada along with five other Canadian teams at the 2020 Continental Cup where they lost 22.5–37.5 to the Europeans. They had a strong showing at the Canadian Open where they made it all the way to the final where they lost to the Brad Jacobs rink. At the 2020 Ontario Tankard, they completed their undefeated run throughout the week with an 8–3 win over Glenn Howard. Representing Ontario at the 2020 Tim Hortons Brier, they finished the championship pool with a 7–4 record and in a four-way tie for fourth place. They defeated Team Wild Card (Mike McEwen) in the first tiebreaker before losing to Northern Ontario (Brad Jacobs) in the second and being eliminated from contention. It would be the team's last event of the season as both the Players' Championship and the Champions Cup Grand Slam events were cancelled due to the COVID-19 pandemic.

Team Epping began the 2020–21 season with a win at the 2020 Stu Sells Toronto Tankard. The 2021 Ontario provincial playdowns were cancelled due to the COVID-19 pandemic in Ontario. As the 2020 provincial champions, Epping's team was chosen to represent Ontario at the 2021 Tim Hortons Brier in Calgary. At the Brier, Epping led his team to a 7–5 seventh-place finish.

The following season, Team Epping played in the 2021 Canadian Olympic Curling Trials, where he missed the playoffs with a 3–5 record. The team re-bounded a month later by winning the ATB Banff Classic. The team played in the 2022 Ontario Tankard, but lost in the final to Team Howard, skipped by Scott Howard. At the 2023 Tankard, Epping's rink reached the semifinal, falling to eventual winners Team Mike McEwen.

During the 2023–24 curling season, Epping won the Stu Sells Living Waters Collingwood Classic on the men's tour, and the St. Thomas Mixed Doubles Classic and the Goldline Mixed Doubles Royal Montreal events on the mixed doubles tour with Weagle and Emily Deschenes respectively. At the 2024 Ontario Tankard, Team Epping made it to the semifinals, where they lost to an upstart Jayden King rink. At the end of the season, it was announced the team would be disbanding.

Epping would announce at the beginning of the season that he would be joining Ian McMillan and brothers Tanner and Jacob Horgan out of Sudbury in Northern Ontario. In their first year together, Epping would have a strong season, playing in the 2025 Masters grand slam event where they would go 2-2 in the round robin and lose to Korey Dropkin in a tiebreaker. Epping would also go undefeated at the 2025 Northern Ontario Men's Provincial Curling Championship to win his first Northern Ontario title and go to the 2025 Montana's Brier. At the Brier, the team would go 6-2 in the round robin, however fail to qualify for the playoffs due to their loss to Reid Carruthers to finish 4th in their group.

=== Mixed Doubles ===
Epping has also found success in mixed doubles curling with partner Lisa Weagle. The pair lost in the quarterfinals of the 2023 Canadian Mixed Doubles Curling Championship to Jennifer Jones and Brent Laing. At the 2024 Canadian Mixed Doubles Curling Championship, she and Epping lost in the qualification playoff game to Nancy Martin and Steve Laycock. Weagle and Epping qualified for the 2025 Canadian Mixed Doubles Curling Olympic Trials, where they finished third, losing 8-6 in the semifinals to Rachel Homan and Brendan Bottcher.

== Coaching ==
Epping began coaching the Xenia Schwaller team from Switzerland during the 2025-26 curling season. As their coach, Team Schwaller won the 2026 Swiss Women's Championships, beating 4-time women's world champion Silvana Tirinzoni in the final, qualifying them to represent Switzerland at the 2026 World Women's Curling Championship. At their first world women's championship, they would impressively finish the round robin with an 11–1 record, finishing in first place and earning a bye to the semifinals. Team Schwaller would then go on to beat Sweden in the semifinals, and then Canada's Kerri Einarson 7–5 in the final to win their first World Women's title.

== Personal life ==
Epping's mother is an avid curler, and his grandfather founded the Ennismore Curling Club just outside Epping's hometown of Peterborough. He is a graduate of Trent University. Epping is employed as a sales director. Epping is openly gay, having come out to his parents in the Fall of 2011, before telling his then-team in 2012, and coming out publicly in 2017. In 2015, he threw the ceremonial first rock at the Canadian Gay Curling Championships, hosted in Toronto. He married Thomas Shipton in 2017. In 2020, Epping was featured in the Men of Curling calendar where he fundraised for the non-profit organization LGBT Youthline. He is currently employed as a sales director.

== Grand Slam record ==
Key
C	Champion
F	Lost in Final
SF	Lost in Semifinal
QF	Lost in Quarterfinals
R16	Lost in the round of 16
Q	Did not advance to playoffs
T2	Played in Tier 2 event
DNP	Did not participate in event
N/A	Not a Grand Slam event that season

Event	2006–07	2007–08	2008–09	2009–10	2010–11	2011–12	2012–13	2013–14	2014–15	2015–16	2016–17	2017–18	2018–19	2019–20	2020–21	2021–22	2022–23	2023–24	2024–25	2025–26	2026–27
Invitational	N/A	N/A	N/A	N/A	N/A	N/A	N/A	N/A	N/A	Q	Q	QF	Q	Q	N/A	N/A	Q	T2	DNP	SF	QF
Masters	DNP	Q	Q	DNP	DNP	F	Q	Q	SF	Q	QF	Q	C	SF	N/A	Q	Q	DNP	Q	QF	QF
National	Q	QF	C	QF	Q	DNP	Q	DNP	Q	SF	QF	SF	Q	Q	N/A	Q	DNP	DNP	DNP	QF	Q
Open	DNP	DNP	Q	SF	Q	Q	Q	QF	Q	C	Q	Q	F	F	N/A	N/A	Q	DNP	DNP	Q	
Players'	DNP	QF	Q	DNP	Q	C	QF	QF	SF	Q	Q	QF	Q	N/A	Q	Q	DNP	DNP	QF	DNP	
Champions Cup	N/A	N/A	N/A	N/A	N/A	N/A	N/A	N/A	N/A	F	SF	DNP	QF	N/A	Q	Q	DNP	N/A	N/A	N/A	N/A
Elite 10	N/A	N/A	N/A	N/A	N/A	N/A	N/A	N/A	Q	QF	Q	QF	SF	N/A	N/A	N/A	N/A	N/A	N/A	N/A	N/A

== Teams ==
Season	Skip	Third	Second	Lead
2003–04	John Epping	Wes Johnson	John Grant	Bill Francis
2004–05	Nick Rizzo	John Epping	Scott Foster	Rob Brockbank
2005–06	Nick Rizzo	John Epping	Scott Foster	Rob Brockbank
2006–07	John Epping	Nick Rizzo	Scott Foster	Ken McDermot
2007–08	Mike Harris	John Epping	Collin Mitchell	Trevor Wall
2008–09	Wayne Middaugh	Jon Mead	John Epping	Scott Bailey
2009–10	Wayne Middaugh	Jon Mead	John Epping	Scott Bailey
2010–11	John Epping	Scott Bailey	Darryl Prebble	Trevor Wall
2011–12	John Epping	Scott Bailey	Scott Howard	David Mathers
2012–13	John Epping	Scott Bailey	Scott Howard	David Mathers
2013–14	John Epping	Scott Bailey	Collin Mitchell	David Mathers
2014–15	John Epping	Travis Fanset	Pat Janssen	Tim March
2015–16	John Epping	Mat Camm	Pat Janssen	Tim March
2016–17	John Epping	Mat Camm	Pat Janssen	Tim March
2017–18	John Epping	Mat Camm	Pat Janssen	Tim March
2018–19	John Epping	Mat Camm	Brent Laing	Craig Savill
2019–20	John Epping	Ryan Fry	Mat Camm	Brent Laing
2020–21	John Epping	Ryan Fry	Mat Camm	Brent Laing
2021–22	John Epping	Ryan Fry	Mat Camm	Brent Laing
2022–23	John Epping	Mat Camm	Pat Janssen	Scott Chadwick
2023–24	John Epping	Mat Camm	Pat Janssen	Jason Camm
2024–25	John Epping	Jacob Horgan	Tanner Horgan	Ian McMillan
2025–26	John Epping	Jacob Horgan	Tanner Horgan	Ian McMillan
2026–27	John Epping	B. J. Neufeld	Ryan Wiebe	Ian McMillan
