= Julie Tippin =

Canadian curler

- Curler
- Born: August 16, 1983 (age 43); Pointe-Claire, Quebec, Canada

Team
- Curling club: Woodstock CC, Woodstock, ON

Curling career
- Member Association: Quebec (1995–1997; 2020–2021); Ontario (1998–2019; 2021–present)
- Hearts: 1 (2022)
- Top CTRS ranking: 11th (2016–17 & 2017–18)

Julie Tippin (born August 16, 1983, in Pointe-Claire, Quebec as Julie Lynne Reddick) is a Canadian curler from Owen Sound, Ontario. Tippin is a three-time provincial junior champion, and a Canadian mixed champion.

== Career ==
Tippin attended high school in Beaconsfield, Quebec where she was on her high school curling team.

Tippin began her successful curling career by winning the 1999 Ontario provincial junior championships. At the 1999 Canadian Junior Curling Championships, Tippin skipped Ontario to an 8–4 record, just out of the playoffs. Tippin was still eligible for Bantams that year, and she won the 1999 Bantam Girls provincial championship as well.

Tippin won another provincial junior championship in 2000 to qualify her for the 2000 Canadian Junior Curling Championships. Again, her Ontario team finished with an 8–4 record, and once again it would not be good enough to make the playoffs.

Tippin won her third provincial junior championship in 2002. At the 2002 Canadian Junior Curling Championships, her team finished with another winning record, this time 7–5, but again they fell short of the playoffs.

Tippin would also find success in Mixed curling. In 2000, she played third for John Epping, winning the provincial mixed junior championship and repeated the title in 2002 when she played third for Sebastien Robillard. Tippin would then win back to back Ontario Mixed titles in 2006 and 2007 throwing third stones for John Epping. The team won the 2006 Canadian Mixed Curling Championship, but were unable to repeat in 2007, finishing 6–5.

== Personal life ==
Tippin attended Oakville Trafalgar High School and Wilfrid Laurier University. She works as a director of corporate services with Keystone Child, Youth and Family Services. She is married and has two children.

== Grand Slam record ==
Key
C	Champion
F	Lost in Final
SF	Lost in Semifinal
QF	Lost in Quarterfinals
R16	Lost in the round of 16
Q	Did not advance to playoffs
T2	Played in Tier 2 event
DNP	Did not participate in event
N/A	Not a Grand Slam event that season

Event	2017–18	2018–19	2019–20	2020–21	2021–22	2022–23
The National	Q	DNP	DNP	N/A	DNP	DNP
Tour Challenge	Q	T2	DNP	N/A	N/A	Q

=== Former events ===
Event	2006–07	2007–08	2008–09	2009–10	2010–11	2011–12	2012–13	2013–14	2014–15
Autumn Gold	QF	DNP	Q	DNP	DNP	DNP	DNP	DNP	Q
Sobeys Slam	N/A	Q	Q	N/A	DNP	N/A	N/A	N/A	N/A
Wayden Transportation	DNP	QF	Q	N/A	N/A	N/A	N/A	N/A	N/A
Casinos of Winnipeg	DNP	DNP	Q	DNP	DNP	DNP	DNP	DNP	N/A
