= 2014 AMJ Campbell Shorty Jenkins Classic =

- Host city: Brockville, Ontario
- Arena: Brockville Country Club
- Dates: September 18–21
- Men's winner: (Ontario) Brad Jacobs
- Curling club: Soo CA, Sault Ste. Marie, Ontario
- Skip: Brad Jacobs
- Third: Ryan Fry
- Second: E. J. Harnden
- Lead: Ryan Harnden
- Finalist: (Prince Edward Island) Adam Casey
- Women's winner: (Ontario) Sherry Middaugh
- Curling club: Coldwater & District CC, Coldwater, Ontario
- Skip: Sherry Middaugh
- Third: Jo-Ann Rizzo
- Second: Lee Merklinger
- Lead: Leigh Armstrong
- Finalist: (Scotland) Eve Muirhead

The 2014 AMJ Campbell Shorty Jenkins Classic was held from September 18 to 21 at the Brockville Country Club in Brockville, Ontario as part of the 2014–15 World Curling Tour. Both the men's and women's events were held in a round robin format. The purse for the men's event was CAD$45,400, while the purse for the women's event was CAD$18,000.

On the men's side, the defending Olympic champion Brad Jacobs rink from Sault Ste. Marie defeated the newly formed Adam Casey rink from Charlottetown, to win their second straight "Shorty" title. On the women's side, the Sherry Middaugh rink from Coldwater, Ontario also won their second Shorty title, defeating Scotland's Eve Muirhead to win the event.

== Men ==
=== Teams ===
The teams are as follows:

Skip	Third	Second	Lead	Locale
Don Bowser	Jonathan Beuk	Wesley Forget	Scott Chadwick	Kingston, Ontario
Reid Carruthers	Braeden Moskowy	Derek Samagalski	Colin Hodgson	Winnipeg, Manitoba
Adam Casey	Josh Barry	Anson Carmody	Robbie Doherty	Charlottetown, Prince Edward Island
Denis Cordick	James Grattan	Doug McDermott	Richard Garden	Georgetown, Ontario
Benoît Schwarz (fourth)	Peter de Cruz (skip)	Claudio Pätz	Valentin Tanner	Geneva, Switzerland
Robert Desjardins	Louis Biron	Frederic Lawton	Maurice Cayouette	Chicoutimi, Quebec
Niklas Edin	Oskar Eriksson	Kristian Lindström	Christoffer Sundgren	Karlstad, Sweden
John Epping	Travis Fanset	Patrick Janssen	Tim March	Toronto, Ontario
Martin Ferland	Philippe Lemay	Mathieu Beaufort	Erik Lachance	Trois-Rivières, Quebec
Joe Frans	Craig Van Ymeren	Bowie Abbis-Mills	Jeff Gorda	Guelph, Ontario
Chris Gardner	Mike McLean	Terry Scharf	Steve Forrest	Ottawa, Ontario
Brad Gushue	Mark Nichols	Brett Gallant	Geoff Walker	St. John's, Newfoundland and Labrador
Mark Homan	Ryan McCrady	Paul Winford	Ron Hrycak	Ottawa, Ontario
Glenn Howard	Richard Hart	Jon Mead	Craig Savill	Penetanguishene, Ontario
Brad Jacobs	Ryan Fry	E. J. Harnden	Ryan Harnden	Sault Ste. Marie, Ontario
Mark Kean	Mathew Camm	David Mathers	Scott Howard	(Ontario) Toronto
William Lyburn	Richard Daneault	Andrew Irving	Daniel Gagne	Winnipeg, Manitoba
Brian Lewis (fourth)	Jeff McCrady (skip)	Mike Johansen	Graham Sinclair	(Ontario) Ottawa
Jean-Michel Ménard	Martin Crête	Éric Sylvain	Philippe Ménard	Gatineau, Quebec
Sven Michel	Florian Meister	Simon Gempeler	Stefan Meienberg	Adelboden, Switzerland
David Murdoch	Greg Drummond	Scott Andrews	Michael Goodfellow	Stirling, Scotland
Rob Rumfeldt	Adam Spencer	Brad Kidd	Jake Higgs	Guelph, Ontario
Jeff Stoughton	Rob Fowler	Alex Forrest	Connor Njegovan	Winnipeg, Manitoba
Wayne Tuck, Jr.	Chad Allen	Connor Duhaime	Chris Jay	Brantford, Ontario

== Standings ==
Final round-robin standings

Key
Teams to Playoffs

Pool A	W	L
(Ontario) Brad Jacobs	5	0
(Ontario) John Epping	4	1
(Ontario) Chris Gardner	3	2
(Quebec) Robert Desjardins	1	4
(Quebec) Jean-Michel Ménard	1	4
(Ontario) Wayne Tuck, Jr.	1	4

Pool B	W	L
(Manitoba) Jeff Stoughton	4	1
(Newfoundland and Labrador) Brad Gushue	4	1
(Switzerland) Sven Michel	3	2
(Quebec) Martin Ferland	3	2
(Ontario) Mark Homan	1	4
(Ontario) Joe Frans	0	5

Pool C	W	L
(Ontario) Glenn Howard	4	1
(Prince Edward Island) Adam Casey	4	1
(Ontario) Don Bowser	3	2
(Manitoba) Reid Carruthers	3	2
(Switzerland) Peter de Cruz	1	4
(Ontario) Denis Cordick	0	5

Pool D	W	L
(Scotland) David Murdoch	4	1
(Sweden) Niklas Edin	3	2
(Ontario) Mark Kean	3	2
(Manitoba) William Lyburn	2	3
(Ontario) Robert Rumfeldt	2	3
(Ontario) Ryan McCrady	1	4

=== Playoffs ===
Quarterfinals
(Ontario) Brad Jacobs	6
(Ontario) Don Bowser	1
(Ontario) John Epping	7
(Newfoundland and Labrador) Brad Gushue	3
(Ontario) Glenn Howard	6
(Manitoba) Jeff Stoughton	4
(Prince Edward Island) Adam Casey	6
(Scotland) David Murdoch	3

Semifinals
(Ontario) Brad Jacobs	7
(Ontario) John Epping	5
(Ontario) Glenn Howard	6
(Prince Edward Island) Adam Casey	7

Final
(Ontario) Brad Jacobs	7
(Prince Edward Island) Adam Casey	1

== Women ==
=== Teams ===
The teams are as follows:

Skip	Third	Second	Lead	Locale
Chrissy Cadorin	Ginger Coyle	Stephanie Thompson	Lauren Wood	Thornhill, Ontario
Lisa Farnell	Mallory Buist	Victoria Kyle	Ainsley Galbraith	Peterborough, Ontario
Julie Hastings	Christy Trombley	Stacey Smith	Katrina Collins	Thornhill, Ontario
Rachel Homan	Emma Miskew	Joanne Courtney	Lisa Weagle	Ottawa, Ontario
Tracy Horgan	Jenn Horgan	Jenna Enge	Amanda Gates	Sudbury, Ontario
Danielle Inglis	Shannon Harrington	Cassandra de Groot	Kiri Campbell	Ottawa, Ontario
Lauren Mann	Amelie Blais	Brittany O'Rourke	Anne-Marie Filteau	Montreal, Quebec
Kimberly Mastine	Nathalie Audet	Audree Dufresne	Saskia Hollands	Sherbrooke, Quebec
Sherry Middaugh	Jo-Ann Rizzo	Lee Merklinger	Leigh Armstrong	Coldwater, Ontario
Erin Morrissey	Karen Sagle	Chantal Allan	Jen Ahde	Ottawa, Ontario
Eve Muirhead	Anna Sloan	Vicki Adams	Sarah Reid	Stirling, Scotland
Brit O'Neill	Julia Weagle	Trish Scharf	Kim Brown	Ottawa, Ontario

=== Round-robin standings ===
Final round-robin standings

Key
Teams to Playoffs

Pool A	W	L
(Ontario) Rachel Homan	4	1
(Ontario) Julie Hastings	4	1
(Ontario) Tracy Horgan	3	2
(Ontario) Erin Morrissey	2	3
(Ontario) Danielle Inglis	1	4
(Ontario) Chrissy Cadorin	1	4

Pool B	W	L
(Ontario) Sherry Middaugh	4	1
(Scotland) Eve Muirhead	4	1
(Quebec) Lauren Mann	4	1
(Quebec) Kimberly Mastine	2	3
(Ontario) Brit O'Neill	1	4
(Ontario) Lisa Farnell	0	5

=== Playoffs ===
Semifinals		Final
(Ontario) Rachel Homan	4
(Scotland) Eve Muirhead	6	(Scotland) Eve Muirhead	5
(Ontario) Sherry Middaugh	7	(Ontario) Sherry Middaugh	8
(Ontario) Julie Hastings	6
