= 2013 AMJ Campbell Shorty Jenkins Classic =

- Host city: Brockville, Ontario
- Arena: Brockville Country Club
- Dates: September 19–22
- Men's winner: (Ontario) Brad Jacobs
- Curling club: Soo CA, Sault Ste. Marie
- Skip: Brad Jacobs
- Third: Ryan Fry
- Second: E. J. Harnden
- Lead: Ryan Harnden
- Finalist: (Manitoba) Jeff Stoughton
- Women's winner: (Switzerland) Mirjam Ott
- Curling club: Davos CC, Davos
- Skip: Mirjam Ott
- Third: Carmen Schäfer
- Second: Carmen Küng
- Lead: Janine Greiner
- Finalist: (Ontario) Rachel Homan

The 2013 AMJ Campbell Shorty Jenkins Classic was held from September 19 to 22 at the Brockville Country Club in Brockville, Ontario as part of the 2013–14 World Curling Tour. Both the men's and women's events was held in a round robin format. The purse for the men's event was CAD$45,400, while the purse for the women's event was CAD$18,000.

In the men's final, Brad Jacobs of Northern Ontario defeated Jeff Stoughton of Manitoba with a score of 7–5 after stealing a point in the last end of an otherwise tight game. In the women's final, Mirjam Ott of Switzerland defeated Ontario's Rachel Homan with a score of 8–5 in seven ends.

== Men ==
=== Teams ===
The teams are listed as follows:

Skip	Third	Second	Lead	Locale
Greg Balsdon	Mark Bice	Tyler Morgan	Jamie Farnell	Toronto, Ontario
Tom Brewster	Greg Drummond	Scott Andrews	Michael Goodfellow	Stirling, Scotland
Mathew Camm (fourth)	Chris Gardner	Brad Kidd	Bryan Cochrane (skip)	Ontario
Denis Cordick				Halton Hills, Ontario
Mark Dacey	Stuart Thompson	Stephen Burgess	Andrew Gibson	Halifax, Nova Scotia
Niklas Edin	Sebastian Kraupp	Fredrik Lindberg	Viktor Kjäll	Karlstad, Sweden
John Epping	Scott Bailey	Collin Mitchell	David Mathers	Toronto, Ontario
Pete Fenson	Shawn Rojeski	Joe Polo	Ryan Brunt	Bemidji, Minnesota
Rob Fowler	Allan Lyburn	Brendan Taylor	Derek Samagalski	Brandon, Manitoba
Joe Frans	Ryan Werenich	Jeff Gorda	Shawn Kaufman	Ontario
Christopher Plys (fourth)	Tyler George (skip)	Rich Ruohonen	Colin Hufman	Duluth, Minnesota
Brad Gushue	Brett Gallant	Adam Casey	Geoff Walker	St. John's, Newfoundland and Labrador
Guy Hemmings	Ghyslain Richard	Maxime Benoit	Simon Benoit	Sorel-Tracy, Quebec
Brent Ross (fourth)	Jake Higgs (skip)	Codey Maus	Bill Buchanan	Ontario
Glenn Howard	Richard Hart	Brent Laing	Craig Savill	Penetanguishene, Ontario
Brad Jacobs	Ryan Fry	E. J. Harnden	Ryan Harnden	Sault Ste. Marie, Ontario
Mark Kean	Travis Fanset	Patrick Janssen	Tim March	Ontario
Philippe Lemay	Mathieu Beaufort	Jean-Michel Arsenault	Erik Lachance	Trois-Rivières, Quebec
Brian Lewis	Jeff McCrady	Steve Doty	Graham Sinclair	Ottawa, Ontario
Kevin Martin	David Nedohin	Marc Kennedy	Ben Hebert	Edmonton, Alberta
Jean-Michel Ménard	Martin Crête	Éric Sylvain	Philippe Ménard	Gatineau, Quebec
Jeff Stoughton	Jon Mead	Reid Carruthers	Mark Nichols	Winnipeg, Manitoba
Wayne Tuck, Jr.	Chad Allen	Jay Allen	Caleb Flaxey	Brantford, Ontario

=== Round Robin Standings ===
Final Round Robin Standings

Key
Teams to Playoffs

Pool A	W	L
(Manitoba) Jeff Stoughton	5	0
(Ontario) Mark Kean	3	2
(Ontario) Jake Higgs	3	2
(Ontario) Brian Lewis	2	3
(Minnesota) Pete Fenson	1	4
(Scotland) David Murdoch	1	4

Pool B	W	L
(Minnesota) Tyler George	4	1
(Ontario) Glenn Howard	3	2
(Ontario) John Epping	3	2
(Nova Scotia) Mark Dacey	2	3
(Quebec) Jean-Michel Ménard	2	3
(Quebec) Guy Hemmings	1	4

Pool C	W	L
(Alberta) Kevin Martin	4	1
(Sweden) Niklas Edin	3	2
(Ontario) Wayne Tuck, Jr.	3	2
(Ontario) Joe Frans	3	2
(Manitoba) Rob Fowler	2	3
(Ontario) Denis Cordick	0	5

Pool D	W	L
(Newfoundland and Labrador) Brad Gushue	4	1
(Ontario) Brad Jacobs	4	1
(Ontario) Greg Balsdon	3	2
(Ontario) Bryan Cochrane	2	3
(Quebec) Philippe Lemay	1	4
(Quebec) Robert Desjardins	0	5

=== Playoffs ===
Quarterfinals
(Manitoba) Jeff Stoughton	4
(Ontario) Glenn Howard	3
(Newfoundland and Labrador) Brad Gushue	5
(Minnesota) Tyler George	2
(Alberta) Kevin Martin	1
(Sweden) Niklas Edin	6
(Ontario) Brad Jacobs	7
(Ontario) Wayne Tuck, Jr.	3

Semifinals
(Manitoba) Jeff Stoughton	8
(Newfoundland and Labrador) Brad Gushue	5
(Sweden) Niklas Edin	3
(Ontario) Brad Jacobs	8

Final
(Manitoba) Jeff Stoughton	5
(Ontario) Brad Jacobs	7

== Women ==
=== Teams ===
The teams are listed as follows:

Skip	Third	Second	Lead	Locale
Erika Brown	Debbie McCormick	Jessica Schultz	Ann Swisshelm	Madison, Wisconsin
Chrissy Cadorin	Katie Lindsay	Stephanie Thompson	Lauren Wood	Toronto, Ontario
Lisa Farnell	Erin Morrissey	Karen Sagle	Ainsley Galbraith	Elgin, Ontario
Rachel Homan	Emma Miskew	Alison Kreviazuk	Lisa Weagle	Ottawa, Ontario
Tracy Horgan	Jenn Horgan	Jenna Enge	Amanda Gates	Sudbury, Ontario
Kimberly Mastine	Nathalie Audet	Audree Dufresne	Saskia Hollands	Montreal, Quebec
Sherry Middaugh	Jo-Ann Rizzo	Lee Merklinger	Leigh Armstrong	Coldwater, Ontario
Eve Muirhead	Anna Sloan	Vicki Adams	Claire Hamilton	Stirling, Scotland
Hollie Nicol	Stephanie LeDrew	Danielle Inglis	Courtney Davies	Toronto, Ontario
Brit O'Neill	Jamie Sinclair	Kim Brown	Trish Scharf	Ottawa, Ontario
Mirjam Ott	Carmen Schäfer	Carmen Küng	Janine Greiner	Davos, Switzerland
Allison Ross	Melissa Gannon	Brittany O'Rourke	Pamela Nugent	Montreal, Quebec

=== Round Robin Standings ===
Final Round Robin Standings

Key
Teams to Playoffs

Pool A	W	L
(Switzerland) Mirjam Ott	5	0
(Ontario) Rachel Homan	4	1
(Ontario) Chrissy Cadorin	2	3
(Quebec) Allison Ross	2	3
(Wisconsin) Erika Brown	1	4
(Ontario) Hollie Nicol	1	4

Pool B	W	L
(Ontario) Sherry Middaugh	5	0
(Ontario) Brit O'Neill	4	1
(Scotland) Eve Muirhead	3	2
(Ontario) Lisa Farnell	2	3
(Quebec) Kimberly Mastine	1	4
(Ontario) Tracy Horgan	0	5

=== Playoffs ===
Semifinals		Final
(Ontario) Sherry Middaugh	2
(Ontario) Rachel Homan	7	(Ontario) Rachel Homan	5
(Switzerland) Mirjam Ott	7	(Switzerland) Mirjam Ott	8
(Ontario) Brit O'Neill	2
