= AMJ Campbell Shorty Jenkins Classic =

Annual curling competition in Ontario, Canada

- Established: 1996
- Host city: Cornwall, Ontario
- Arena: Cornwall Curling Centre
- Men's purse: $60,000
- Women's purse: $45,000

Current champions (2026)
- Men: (Scotland) Grant Hardie
- Women: (Switzerland) Alina Pätz

Current edition
- 2026 AMJ Campbell Shorty Jenkins Classic

Location in Canada

The AMJ Campbell Shorty Jenkins Classic (formerly known as the M&M Meat Shops Shorty Jenkins Classic, CIBC Trust Shorty Jenkins Classic and just the Shorty Jenkins Classic) is an annual curling tournament, held in September at the Cornwall Curling Centre in Cornwall, Ontario and sponsored by AMJ Campbell Van Lines. It is one of the first curling tournaments of the World Curling Tour season. The tournament is held in honour of the famous icemaker, Shorty Jenkins. The total purse for the men's event is $59,000 and $29,500 for the women's. The event was held in Brockville, Ontario until 2015 when it was moved down the Saint Lawrence to Cornwall.

The event was created in 1996 by Jenkins and Gord McCrady to "repay the Brockville Country Club for funds used to buy a new compressor, chiller and condenser." The following year a women's event was added.

The Shorty Jenkins Classic scheduled for September 2020 was cancelled due to the COVID-19 pandemic. The event was not held again until 2023 due to the pandemic.

== Past champions ==
=== Men ===
Year	Winning skip	Runner-up skip	Purse (CAD)
1996	(Ontario) Rich Moffatt	(Ontario) Wayne Middaugh	$29,000
1997	(Manitoba) Jeff Stoughton	(Ontario) Jeff McCrady	$25,000
1998	(Ontario) Rich Moffatt	(Manitoba) Jeff Stoughton	$27,500
1999	(Manitoba) Jeff Stoughton	(Ontario) Rich Moffatt	
2000	(Ontario) Scott Patterson	(Ontario) Peter Corner	
2001	(Manitoba) Jeff Stoughton	(Ontario) Glenn Howard	$36,000
2002	Not held		
2003	(Ontario) Glenn Howard	(Ontario) Scott Patterson	$30,000
2004	(Alberta) Kevin Martin	(Ontario) Brian Lewis	$30,000
2005	(Ontario) Glenn Howard	(Ontario) Nick Rizzo	$34,000
2006	(Alberta) Kevin Martin	(Ontario) Heath McCormick	$36,000
2007	(Ontario) Glenn Howard	(Newfoundland and Labrador) Brad Gushue	$36,000
2008	(Ontario) Richard Hart (Note: Hart was skipping in place of Glenn Howard, who was injured.)	(Manitoba) Kerry Burtnyk	$36,000
2009	(Newfoundland and Labrador) Brad Gushue	(Alberta) Kevin Martin	$36,000
2010	(Quebec) Jean-Michel Ménard	(Ontario) Brad Jacobs	$40,700
2011	(Ontario) John Epping	(Ontario) Chad Allen	$40,700
2012	(Ontario) John Epping	(Manitoba) Jeff Stoughton	$40,700
2013	(Ontario) Brad Jacobs	(Manitoba) Jeff Stoughton	$45,400
2014	(Ontario) Brad Jacobs	(Prince Edward Island) Adam Casey	$45,400
2015	(Newfoundland and Labrador) Brad Gushue	(Ontario) Glenn Howard	$46,000
2016	(Alberta) Kevin Koe	(Newfoundland and Labrador) Mark Nichols (Note: Nichols was skipping in place of Brad Gushue, who was injured.)	$59,000
2017	(Ontario) Brad Jacobs	(Manitoba) Mike McEwen	$60,200
2018	(Ontario) John Epping	(Ontario) Brad Jacobs	$59,000
2019	(Ontario) John Epping	(Ontario) Brad Jacobs	$59,000
2020–2022	Cancelled		
2023	(Scotland) Ross Whyte	(Sweden) Niklas Edin	$60,000
2024	(Switzerland) Yannick Schwaller	(Scotland) Bruce Mouat	$60,000
2025	(Ontario) John Epping	(Switzerland) Yannick Schwaller	$60,000
2026	(Scotland) Grant Hardie	(Manitoba) John Epping	$60,000

=== Women ===
Year	Winning skip	Runner-up skip	Purse (CAD)
1997	(Ontario) Rhonda Preston	(Ontario) Anne Merklinger	
1998	(Quebec) Chantal Osborne	(Quebec) Cheryl Morgan	
1999	(Nova Scotia) Colleen Jones	(Quebec) Brenda Nicholls	
2000	(Quebec) Chantal Osborne	(Quebec) Catherine Derick	
2001	(Ontario) Cheryl McBain	(Quebec) Brenda Nicholls	
2002	Not held		
2003	(United States) Patti Lank	(Ontario) Janet McGhee-Brown	
2004	(Ontario) Jo-Ann Rizzo	(Ontario) Janet McGhee	
2005	(Ontario) Janet McGhee	(Ontario) Jenn Hanna	$14,000
2006	(Ontario) Carrie Lindner	(Quebec) Chantal Osborne	$12,000
2007	(United States) Debbie McCormick	(Quebec) Ève Bélisle	
2008	(Quebec) Marie-France Larouche	(Quebec) Ève Bélisle	$16,000
2009	(Ontario) Rachel Homan	(Quebec) Ève Bélisle	
2010	(Ontario) Rachel Homan	(Ontario) Tracy Horgan	$16,400
2011	(Ontario) Sherry Middaugh	(Ontario) Rachel Homan	$16,400
2012	(Ontario) Tracy Horgan	(Scotland) Eve Muirhead	$18,000
2013	(Switzerland) Mirjam Ott	(Ontario) Rachel Homan	$18,000
2014	(Ontario) Sherry Middaugh	(Scotland) Eve Muirhead	$18,000
2015	(South Korea) Kim Eun-jung	(Ontario) Allison Flaxey	$20,000
2016	(Ontario) Rachel Homan	(Ontario) Allison Flaxey	$29,500
2017	(United States) Jamie Sinclair	(Ontario) Krista McCarville	$29,500
2018	(Sweden) Isabella Wranå	(Ontario) Hollie Duncan	$34,500
2019	(Manitoba) Jennifer Jones	(Manitoba) Tracy Fleury	$34,500
2020–2022	Cancelled		
2023	(Switzerland) Silvana Tirinzoni	(Japan) Yuna Kotani	$45,000
2024	(Ontario) Rachel Homan	(Switzerland) Silvana Tirinzoni	$45,000
2025	(Switzerland) Xenia Schwaller	(Denmark) Madeleine Dupont	$45,000
2026	(Switzerland) Alina Pätz	(Switzerland) Xenia Schwaller	$45,000
