= 2011 AMJ Campbell Shorty Jenkins Classic =

- Host city: Brockville, Ontario
- Arena: Brockville Country Club
- Dates: September 15–18
- Men's winner: (Ontario) John Epping
- Curling club: Toronto, Ontario
- Skip: John Epping
- Third: Scott Bailey
- Second: Scott Howard
- Lead: David Mathers
- Finalist: (Ontario) Chad Allen
- Women's winner: (Ontario) Sherry Middaugh
- Curling club: Coldwater, Ontario
- Skip: Sherry Middaugh
- Third: Jo-Ann Rizzo
- Second: Lee Merklinger
- Lead: Leigh Armstrong
- Finalist: (Ontario) Rachel Homan

The 2011 AMJ Campbell Shorty Jenkins Classic was an annual curling bonspiel that was held from September 15 to 18 at the Brockville Country Club in Brockville, Ontario as part of the 2011–12 World Curling Tour. The purse for the men's and women's events was CAD$40,700 and CAD$16,400, respectively.

== Men ==
=== Teams ===
Skip	Third	Second	Lead	Locale
Chad Allen	Travis Fanset	Jay Allen	Jim Clayton	Brantford, Ontario
Mark Bice	Codey Maus	Steve Bice	Jamie Danbrook	Sarnia, Ontario
Serge Reid (fourth)	Francois Gionest	Simon Collin	Pierre Charette (skip)	Saguenay, Quebec
Dave Collyer	Evan Sullivan	Bill Leitch	Peter Aker	Belleville, Ontario
Denis Cordick	John Morris	Kevin Stringer	Richard Garden	Georgetown, Ontario
Robert Desjardins	Jean-Sébastien Roy	Steven Munroe	Steeve Villeneuve	Chicoutimi, Quebec
John Epping	Scott Bailey	Scott Howard	David Mathers	Toronto, Ontario
Pete Fenson	Shawn Rojeski	Joe Polo	Ryan Brunt	Bemidji, Minnesota
Martin Ferland	Francois Roberge	Shawn Fowler	Maxime Elmaleh	Quebec City, Quebec
Dwayne Fowler	Mike Fournier	Dan Cook	Ian Bridger	Prescott, Ontario
Chris Gardner	Don Bowser	Brad Kidd	Simon Barrick	Ottawa, Ontario
Tyler George	Chris Plys	Rich Ruohonen	Aanders Brorson	Duluth, Minnesota
Jason Gunnlaugson	Justin Richter	Jason Ackerman	David Kraichy	Beausejour, Manitoba
Brad Gushue	Ryan Fry	Geoff Walker	Adam Casey	St. Johns, Newfoundland and Labrador
Guy Hemmings	François Gagné	Benoit Vezeau	Christian Bouchard	Mount Royal, Quebec
Glenn Howard	Wayne Middaugh	Brent Laing	Craig Savill	Coldwater, Ontario
Brad Jacobs	E. J. Harnden	Ryan Harnden	Scott Seabrook	Sault Ste. Marie, Ontario
Mark Kean	Andrew Clayton	Patrick Janssen	Tim March	Toronto, Ontario
Dale Matchett	Ryan Werenich	Jeff Gorda	Shawn Kaufman	Bradford, Ontario
Jeff McCrady	Brian Lewis	Steve Doty	Graham Sinclair	Ottawa, Ontario
Jean-Michel Ménard	Martin Crête	Éric Sylvain	Philippe Ménard	Gatineau/Lévis, Quebec
Matt Paul	Mathew Camm	Andrew Hamilton	Ed Cyr	Ottawa, Ontario
Ken Thompson	Scott Buckley	Dave Burgess	Kevin MacLean	Kingston, Ontario
Wayne Tuck, Jr.	Craig Kochan	Scott McDonald	Paul Moffatt	Toronto, Ontario

=== Round Robin Standings ===
Pool A	W	L
(Ontario) Glenn Howard	5	0
(Ontario) Matt Paul	3	2
(Ontario) Mark Kean	3	2
(Ontario) Mark Bice	2	3
(Ontario) Denis Cordick	1	4
(Quebec) Guy Hemmings	1	4

Pool B	W	L
(Ontario) Chad Allen	5	0
(Ontario) Brad Jacobs	4	1
(Quebec) Robert Desjardins	3	2
(Minnesota) Pete Fenson	2	3
(Ontario) Ken Thompson	1	4
(Quebec) Pierre Charette	0	5

Pool C	W	L
(Minnesota) Tyler George	5	0
(Newfoundland and Labrador) Brad Gushue	3	2
(Quebec) Martin Ferland	3	2
(Manitoba) Jason Gunnlaugson	3	2
(Ontario) Dale Matchett	1	4
(Ontario) Dave Collyer	0	5

Pool D	W	L
(Ontario) John Epping	4	1
(Ontario) Dwayne Fowler	3	2
(Ontario) Chris Gardner	2	3
(Ontario) Jeff McCrady	2	3
(Quebec) Jean-Michel Ménard	2	3
(Ontario) Wayne Tuck, Jr.	2	3

=== Playoffs ===
Quarterfinals
(Ontario) Glenn Howard	5
(Newfoundland and Labrador) Brad Gushue	3
(Ontario) John Epping	5
(Ontario) Brad Jacobs	4
(Ontario) Chad Allen	7
(Quebec) Robert Desjardins	6
(Minnesota) Tyler George	4
(Ontario) Matt Paul	2

Semifinals
(Ontario) Glenn Howard	4
(Ontario) John Epping	6
(Ontario) Chad Allen	4
(Minnesota) Tyler George	3

Final
(Ontario) John Epping	8
(Ontario) Chad Allen	3

== Women ==
=== Teams ===
Skip	Third	Second	Lead	Locale
Ève Bélisle*	Joëlle Sabourin	Catherine Derick	Sylvie Daniel	Thurso, Quebec
Chrissy Cadorin	Brit O'Neill	Jenn Minchin	Jasmine Thurston	Glendale, Ontario
Lisa Farnell	Erin Morrissey	Kim Brown	Ainsley Galbraith	Chaffeys Locks, Ontario
Jacqueline Harrison	Lori Eddy	Kimberly Tuck	Julie Columbus	Elmvale, Ontario
Jennifer Harvey	Carol Evjimoto	Lindsay Jones	Tammy Jeffery	Ottawa, Ontario
Rachel Homan	Emma Miskew	Alison Kreviazuk	Lisa Weagle	Ottawa, Ontario
Tracy Horgan	Jenn Seabrook	Jenna Enge	Amanda Gates	Sudbury, Ontario
Kimberly Mastine	Nathalie Audet	Audree Dufresne	Saskia Hollands	Montreal, Quebec
Robyn Mattie	Lauren Mann	Patricia Hill	Andrea Leganchuk	Ottawa, Ontario
Sherry Middaugh	Jo-Ann Rizzo	Lee Merklinger	Leigh Armstrong	Coldwater, Ontario
Allison Ross	Alanna Routledge	Kristen Richard	Brittany O'Rourke	Howick, Quebec
Kirsten Wall	Hollie Nicol	Danielle Inglis	Jill Mouzar	Toronto, Ontario

* Ève Bélisle was filling in for Chantal Osborne.

=== Round Robin Standings ===
Pool A	W	L
(Ontario) Rachel Homan	5	0
(Ontario) Jacqueline Harrison	3	2
(Quebec) Ève Bélisle	3	2
(Quebec) Kimberly Mastine	2	3
(Ontario) Tracy Horgan	2	3
(Ontario) Jennifer Harvey	0	5

Pool B	W	L
(Ontario) Sherry Middaugh	4	1
(Ontario) Lisa Farnell	3	2
(Ontario) Chrissy Cadorin	3	2
(Ontario) Robyn Mattie	3	2
(Ontario) Kirsten Wall	2	3
(Quebec) Allison Ross	0	5

=== Playoffs ===
Semifinals
1	(Ontario) Rachel Homan	8
4	(Ontario) Jacqueline Harrison	4
3	(Ontario) Sherry Middaugh	7
2	(Ontario) Lisa Farnell	0

Final
(Ontario) Rachel Homan	3
(Ontario) Sherry Middaugh	4
