= 2026 AMJ Campbell Shorty Jenkins Classic =

- Host city: Cornwall, Ontario
- Arena: Cornwall Curling Centre
- Dates: September 16–20
- Men's winner: (Scotland) Team Hardie
- Curling club: The Peak, Stirling
- Skip: Grant Hardie
- Fourth: Ross Whyte
- Second: Craig Waddell
- Lead: Euan Kyle
- Finalist: (Manitoba) John Epping
- Women's winner: (Switzerland) Team Pätz
- Curling club: CC Genève, Geneva
- Skip: Alina Pätz
- Third: Selina Witschonke
- Second: Stefanie Berset
- Lead: Renée Frigo
- Finalist: (Switzerland) Xenia Schwaller

The 2026 AMJ Campbell Shorty Jenkins Classic is a curling tournament held from September 16 to 20 at the Cornwall Curling Centre in Cornwall, Ontario. The event will be held in a round robin format with a purse of $60,000 on the men's side and $45,000 on the women's side.

New for this season, the AMJ Shorty Jenkins Classic is part of the GSOC Satellite Events series, in which the Grand Slam of Curling has partnered with established tour events to help teams qualify for Grand Slam events. The winners of the men's and women's events, or the highest-finishing team if the winners are already qualified, will earn direct-entry berths for the 2026 GSOC Invitational, held from October 13 to 18 in Victoria, British Columbia. On the men's side, as the winners Team Hardie had already qualified, Manitoba's John Epping who finished in second qualified for the Invitational. In the women's event, as both teams in the final had already qualified, Miyu Ueno from Japan earned the spot as the highest-ranked semifinal team.

== Men ==
=== Teams ===
The teams are listed as follows:

Skip	Third	Second	Lead	Alternate	Locale
Félix Asselin	Julien Tremblay	Jesse Mullen	Jean-Michel Arsenault		Laval, Quebec
Adam Bédard	Nathan Beaudoin-Gendron	Patrick Bédard	Marc-Antoine Robert		Rouyn-Noranda, Quebec
Owen MacTavish (Fourth)	Aaron Benning (Skip)	Cameron Wright	Alex Greenwood		Cornwall, Ontario
Jason Camm	Sam Wills	Wyatt Small	Nathan Steele		Navan, Ontario
Daniel Casper	Luc Violette	Ben Richardson	Aidan Oldenburg		(United States) Chaska, Minnesota
Alex Champ	Ben Bevan	Stuart Leslie	Travis Ackroyd		Toronto, Ontario
James Grattan (Fourth)	Denis Cordick (Skip)	Drew Grattan	Doug McDermot		Halton Hills, Ontario
John Epping	B.J. Neufeld	Ryan Wiebe	Ian McMillan		Winnipeg, Manitoba
Ross Whyte (Fourth)	Grant Hardie (Skip)	Craig Waddell	Euan Kyle		Stirling, Scotland
Philipp Hösli (Fourth)	Marco Hösli (Skip)	Simon Gloor	Justin Hausherr		Glarus, Switzerland
Scott Howard	David Mathers	Pat Janssen	Scott Chadwick		Midland, Ontario
Jayden King	Dylan Niepage	Owen Henry	Victor Pietrangelo		Tillsonburg, Ontario
Lukáš Klíma	Vít Chabičovský	Martin Jurík	Lukáš Klípa		Prague, Czech Republic
Sam Mooibroek	Owen Purcell	Scott Mitchell	Gavin Lydiate		Whitby, Ontario
Pierre-Luc Morissette	Pierre-Olivier Roy	Pierre Lajoie	Étienne Elias		Quebec City, Quebec
Owen Nicholls	Jordan McNamara	Jack Ragan	Jacob Clarke	Philip Burgess	Ottawa, Ontario
Joël Retornaz	Stefano Gilli	Andrea Gilli	Alberto Pimpini		Brunico, Italy
Darryl Sobering	Gabriel Nickel	Ryan Swift	Alec Celecki	Vincent Scebbi	(United States) Denver, Colorado
Nathan Young	Brady Lumley	Matthew Garner	Spencer Dunlop		Oakville, Ontario
Mattia Giovanella (Fourth)	Alberto Zisa (Skip)	Francesco De Zanna	Francesco Vigliani		Trentino, Italy

=== Round robin standings ===
Final Round Robin Standings

Key
Teams to Playoffs

Pool A	W	L	PF	PA
(Scotland) Grant Hardie	5	0	46	14
(Ontario) Sam Mooibroek	4	1	35	21
(Ontario) Nathan Young	2	3	20	27
(Ontario) Denis Cordick	1	4	16	35
(Ontario) Alex Champ	0	5	25	43

Pool B	W	L	PF	PA
(Italy) Joël Retornaz	5	0	41	16
(United States) Daniel Casper	4	1	30	14
(Italy) Alberto Zisa	3	2	33	22
(Ontario) Owen Nicholls	1	4	15	36
(Quebec) Adam Bédard	0	5	16	49

Pool C	W	L	PF	PA
(Switzerland) Marco Hösli	5	0	40	14
(Czech Republic) Lukáš Klíma	4	1	39	15
(Quebec) Félix Asselin	3	2	32	26
(United States) Darryl Sobering	1	4	15	39
(Quebec) Pierre-Luc Morissette	0	5	12	39

Pool D	W	L	PF	PA
(Manitoba) John Epping	5	0	40	13
(Ontario) Scott Howard	3	2	30	29
(Ontario) Jayden King	2	3	26	21
(Ontario) Jason Camm	1	4	15	35
(Ontario) Aaron Benning	1	4	22	40

=== Round robin results ===
All draw times are listed in Eastern Time (UTC−04:00).

==== Draw 1 ====
Wednesday, September 16, 5:00 pm

Sheet 1	1	2	3	4	5	6	7	8	Final
(Switzerland) Marco Hösli 🔨	1	0	2	1	0	4	X	X	8
(Ontario) Jason Camm	0	1	0	0	1	0	X	X	2

Sheet 2	1	2	3	4	5	6	7	8	Final
(Quebec) Félix Asselin	0	5	0	3	0	5	X	X	13
(United States) Darryl Sobering 🔨	1	0	1	0	1	0	X	X	3

Sheet 4	1	2	3	4	5	6	7	8	Final
(Ontario) Sam Mooibroek	2	0	1	0	2	0	4	X	9
(Ontario) Alex Champ 🔨	0	2	0	3	0	1	0	X	6

Sheet 5	1	2	3	4	5	6	7	8	Final
(Czech Republic) Lukáš Klíma	2	0	0	0	2	2	0	4	10
(Ontario) Scott Howard 🔨	0	0	1	1	0	0	3	0	5

==== Draw 2 ====
Wednesday, September 16, 8:00 pm

Sheet 1	1	2	3	4	5	6	7	8	Final
(Scotland) Grant Hardie	4	0	2	0	3	4	X	X	13
(Quebec) Adam Bédard 🔨	0	3	0	2	0	0	X	X	5

==== Draw 3 ====
Thursday, September 17, 8:00 am

Sheet 1	1	2	3	4	5	6	7	8	Final
(United States) Daniel Casper 🔨	1	0	0	1	1	0	0	1	4
(Italy) Alberto Zisa	0	0	2	0	0	1	0	0	3

Sheet 2	1	2	3	4	5	6	7	8	Final
(Ontario) Nathan Young 🔨	3	0	0	2	0	2	0	2	9
(Ontario) Alex Champ	0	1	3	0	2	0	1	0	7

Sheet 3	1	2	3	4	5	6	7	8	Final
(Italy) Joël Retornaz 🔨	2	2	0	1	0	4	X	X	9
(Ontario) Owen Nicholls	0	0	1	0	1	0	X	X	2

Sheet 6	1	2	3	4	5	6	7	8	Final
(Ontario) Jason Camm 🔨	2	0	3	4	0	X	X	X	9
(Ontario) Aaron Benning	0	1	0	0	1	X	X	X	2

==== Draw 4 ====
Thursday, September 17, 11:00 am

Sheet 2	1	2	3	4	5	6	7	8	Final
(Czech Republic) Lukáš Klíma	2	1	1	3	0	1	X	X	8
(Quebec) Pierre-Luc Morissette 🔨	0	0	0	0	1	0	X	X	1

Sheet 5	1	2	3	4	5	6	7	8	Final
(Switzerland) Marco Hösli 🔨	1	0	2	2	0	3	X	X	8
(United States) Darryl Sobering	0	1	0	0	1	0	X	X	2

==== Draw 5 ====
Thursday, September 11, 2:00 pm

Sheet 1	1	2	3	4	5	6	7	8	Final
(Ontario) Alex Champ 🔨	1	1	0	2	0	1	0	0	5
(Italy) Joël Retornaz	0	0	3	0	1	0	0	3	7

Sheet 2	1	2	3	4	5	6	7	8	Final
(Scotland) Grant Hardie 🔨	0	1	2	6	X	X	X	X	9
(Ontario) Denis Cordick	0	0	0	0	X	X	X	X	0

Sheet 4	1	2	3	4	5	6	7	8	Final
(United States) Daniel Casper 🔨	2	1	0	3	4	X	X	X	10
(Quebec) Adam Bédard	0	0	1	0	0	X	X	X	1

Sheet 5	1	2	3	4	5	6	7	8	Final
(Manitoba) John Epping 🔨	2	1	0	0	1	1	2	X	7
(Ontario) Scott Howard	0	0	1	1	0	0	0	X	2

==== Draw 6 ====
Thursday, September 17, 5:00 pm

Sheet 2	1	2	3	4	5	6	7	8	Final
(Ontario) Sam Mooibroek 🔨	1	0	1	1	1	2	2	X	8
(Ontario) Owen Nicholls	0	2	0	0	0	0	0	X	2

Sheet 3	1	2	3	4	5	6	7	8	Final
(Quebec) Pierre-Luc Morissette 🔨	0	0	0	3	0	0	0	X	3
(United States) Darryl Sobering	1	1	1	0	1	2	2	X	8

Sheet 5	1	2	3	4	5	6	7	8	Final
(Switzerland) Marco Hösli 🔨	1	1	0	2	0	1	0	1	6
(Czech Republic) Lukáš Klíma	0	0	1	0	2	0	1	0	4

==== Draw 7 ====
Thursday, September 17, 8:00 pm

Sheet 3	1	2	3	4	5	6	7	8	Final
(Manitoba) John Epping 🔨	2	1	0	3	0	6	X	X	12
(Ontario) Aaron Benning	0	0	1	0	2	0	X	X	3

Sheet 5	1	2	3	4	5	6	7	8	Final
(Quebec) Félix Asselin 🔨	1	0	2	0	0	1	3	X	7
(Ontario) Jayden King	0	2	0	0	0	0	0	X	2

==== Draw 8 ====
Friday, September 18, 8:00 am

Sheet 3	1	2	3	4	5	6	7	8	Final
(Scotland) Grant Hardie 🔨	0	1	1	0	2	0	4	X	8
(Ontario) Sam Mooibroek	2	0	0	1	0	1	0	X	4

Sheet 4	1	2	3	4	5	6	7	8	Final
(Italy) Alberto Zisa	2	0	2	0	1	3	X	X	8
(Ontario) Owen Nicholls 🔨	0	1	0	2	0	0	X	X	3

Sheet 5	1	2	3	4	5	6	7	8	Final
(Ontario) Nathan Young	0	1	0	0	0	0	1	X	2
(United States) Daniel Casper 🔨	1	0	0	2	1	1	0	X	5

Sheet 6	1	2	3	4	5	6	7	8	Final
(Ontario) Alex Champ 🔨	3	0	0	0	0	0	X	X	3
(Ontario) Denis Cordick	0	1	4	1	2	1	X	X	9

==== Draw 9 ====
Friday, September 18, 11:00 am

Sheet 1	1	2	3	4	5	6	7	8	Final
(United States) Darryl Sobering	1	0	0	0	0	X	X	X	1
(Manitoba) John Epping 🔨	0	2	2	2	1	X	X	X	7

Sheet 2	1	2	3	4	5	6	7	8	Final
(Ontario) Jayden King	2	1	2	4	X	X	X	X	9
(Ontario) Jason Camm 🔨	0	0	0	0	X	X	X	X	0

Sheet 4	1	2	3	4	5	6	7	8	Final
(Ontario) Scott Howard	3	0	0	4	1	1	0	X	9
(Ontario) Aaron Benning 🔨	0	4	1	0	0	0	1	X	6

Sheet 6	1	2	3	4	5	6	7	8	Final
(Quebec) Félix Asselin	1	0	2	1	2	0	X	X	6
(Quebec) Pierre-Luc Morissette 🔨	0	1	0	0	0	1	X	X	2

==== Draw 10 ====
Friday, September 18, 2:00 pm

Sheet 2	1	2	3	4	5	6	7	8	Final
(Ontario) Denis Cordick	0	0	0	0	1	0	X	X	1
(Italy) Alberto Zisa 🔨	1	1	0	2	0	4	X	X	8

==== Draw 11 ====
Friday, September 18, 5:00 pm

Sheet 1	1	2	3	4	5	6	7	8	Final
(Ontario) Nathan Young 🔨	1	0	0	0	0	0	X	X	1
(Ontario) Sam Mooibroek	0	1	1	1	0	3	X	X	6

Sheet 2	1	2	3	4	5	6	7	8	Final
(Italy) Joël Retornaz 🔨	0	5	3	2	X	X	X	X	10
(Quebec) Adam Bédard	1	0	0	0	X	X	X	X	1

Sheet 4	1	2	3	4	5	6	7	8	Final
(Switzerland) Marco Hösli	1	0	3	0	4	X	X	X	8
(Quebec) Pierre-Luc Morissette 🔨	0	1	0	1	0	X	X	X	2

Sheet 5	1	2	3	4	5	6	7	8	Final
(Ontario) Jayden King	1	0	3	1	1	0	X	X	6
(Ontario) Aaron Benning 🔨	0	1	0	0	0	1	X	X	2

Sheet 6	1	2	3	4	5	6	7	8	Final
(United States) Daniel Casper 🔨	2	1	1	1	0	3	X	X	8
(Ontario) Owen Nicholls	0	0	0	0	1	0	X	X	1

==== Draw 12 ====
Friday, September 18, 8:00 pm

Sheet 1	1	2	3	4	5	6	7	8	Final
(Czech Republic) Lukáš Klíma	1	0	5	0	3	X	X	X	9
(Quebec) Félix Asselin 🔨	0	1	0	1	0	X	X	X	2

Sheet 3	1	2	3	4	5	6	7	8	Final
(Ontario) Jason Camm	0	0	0	X	X	X	X	X	0
(Ontario) Scott Howard 🔨	1	1	5	X	X	X	X	X	7

==== Draw 13 ====
Saturday, September 19, 8:00 am

Sheet 4	1	2	3	4	5	6	7	8	Final
(Ontario) Owen Nicholls	3	0	0	0	2	1	1	X	7
(Quebec) Adam Bédard 🔨	0	1	1	1	0	0	0	X	3

Sheet 5	1	2	3	4	5	6	7	8	Final
(Ontario) Nathan Young	2	0	3	2	0	X	X	X	7
(Ontario) Denis Cordick 🔨	0	1	0	0	1	X	X	X	2

==== Draw 14 ====
Saturday, September 19, 11:00 am

Sheet 3	1	2	3	4	5	6	7	8	Final
(Italy) Joël Retornaz	0	0	4	0	3	1	0	X	8
(Italy) Alberto Zisa 🔨	1	1	0	2	0	0	1	X	5

Sheet 4	1	2	3	4	5	6	7	8	Final
(Manitoba) John Epping	0	2	0	1	1	0	1	X	5
(Ontario) Jayden King 🔨	1	0	1	0	0	1	0	X	3

Sheet 5	1	2	3	4	5	6	7	8	Final
(Scotland) Grant Hardie 🔨	3	0	2	0	0	2	2	X	9
(Ontario) Alex Champ	0	1	0	3	0	0	0	X	4

Sheet 6	1	2	3	4	5	6	7	8	Final
(Czech Republic) Lukáš Klíma 🔨	2	1	1	0	4	X	X	X	8
(United States) Darryl Sobering	0	0	0	1	0	X	X	X	1

==== Draw 15 ====
Saturday, September 19, 2:00 pm

Sheet 3	1	2	3	4	5	6	7	8	Final
(Switzerland) Marco Hösli	0	2	0	0	2	0	3	3	10
(Quebec) Félix Asselin 🔨	2	0	1	0	0	1	0	0	4

Sheet 4	1	2	3	4	5	6	7	8	Final
(Ontario) Sam Mooibroek 🔨	2	0	3	0	0	3	X	X	8
(Ontario) Denis Cordick	0	3	0	0	1	0	X	X	4

==== Draw 16 ====
Saturday, September 19, 5:00 pm

Sheet 1	1	2	3	4	5	6	7	8	9	Final
(Ontario) Jayden King 🔨	1	0	2	0	0	0	2	1	0	6
(Ontario) Scott Howard	0	1	0	2	1	2	0	0	1	7

Sheet 2	1	2	3	4	5	6	7	8	Final
(Quebec) Pierre-Luc Morissette 🔨	1	0	1	0	2	0	0	X	4
(Ontario) Aaron Benning	0	1	0	5	0	2	1	X	9

Sheet 3	1	2	3	4	5	6	7	8	Final
(Italy) Alberto Zisa	0	5	1	0	0	2	0	1	9
(Quebec) Adam Bédard 🔨	1	0	0	1	1	0	3	0	6

Sheet 4	1	2	3	4	5	6	7	8	Final
(Scotland) Grant Hardie 🔨	2	1	0	4	X	X	X	X	7
(Ontario) Nathan Young	0	0	1	0	X	X	X	X	1

Sheet 5	1	2	3	4	5	6	7	8	Final
(United States) Daniel Casper	0	0	1	0	2	0	0	X	3
(Italy) Joël Retornaz 🔨	0	2	0	1	0	0	4	X	7

Sheet 6	1	2	3	4	5	6	7	8	Final
(Manitoba) John Epping 🔨	2	0	3	0	1	0	3	X	9
(Ontario) Jason Camm	0	1	0	2	0	1	0	X	4

=== Playoffs ===
Quarterfinals
1	(Scotland) Grant Hardie	6
8	(Italy) Alberto Zisa	2
4	(Switzerland) Marco Hösli	4
5	(Ontario) Sam Mooibroek	2
2	(Manitoba) John Epping	9
7	(Czech Republic) Lukáš Klíma	8
3	(Italy) Joël Retornaz	6
6	(United States) Daniel Casper	7

Semifinals
1	(Scotland) Grant Hardie	8
4	(Switzerland) Marco Hösli	3
2	(Manitoba) John Epping	8
6	(United States) Daniel Casper	2

Final
1	(Scotland) Grant Hardie	6
2	(Manitoba) John Epping	4

==== Quarterfinals ====
Sunday, September 20, 8:30 am

Sheet 1	1	2	3	4	5	6	7	8	Final
(Italy) Joël Retornaz 🔨	0	2	0	1	0	0	2	1	6
(United States) Daniel Casper	0	0	2	0	2	3	0	0	7

Sheet 4	1	2	3	4	5	6	7	8	Final
(Scotland) Grant Hardie 🔨	3	0	1	2	0	X	X	X	6
(Italy) Alberto Zisa	0	1	0	0	1	X	X	X	2

Sheet 5	1	2	3	4	5	6	7	8	9	Final
(Manitoba) John Epping 🔨	3	0	0	1	0	1	0	3	1	9
(Czech Republic) Lukáš Klíma	0	1	2	0	4	0	1	0	0	8

Sheet 6	1	2	3	4	5	6	7	8	Final
(Switzerland) Marco Hösli 🔨	0	1	0	1	0	1	1	X	4
(Ontario) Sam Mooibroek	0	0	1	0	1	0	0	X	2

==== Semifinals ====
Sunday, September 20, 12:00 pm

Sheet 2	1	2	3	4	5	6	7	8	Final
(Manitoba) John Epping 🔨	2	0	1	1	1	0	3	X	8
(United States) Daniel Casper	0	0	0	0	0	2	0	X	2

Sheet 3	1	2	3	4	5	6	7	8	Final
(Scotland) Grant Hardie 🔨	2	1	0	2	0	3	X	X	8
(Switzerland) Marco Hösli	0	0	1	0	2	0	X	X	3

==== Final ====
Sunday, September 20, 3:00 pm

Sheet 5	1	2	3	4	5	6	7	8	Final
(Scotland) Grant Hardie	0	0	0	3	1	0	0	2	6
(Manitoba) John Epping 🔨	1	0	1	0	0	1	1	0	4

== Women ==
=== Teams ===
The teams are listed as follows:

Skip	Third	Second	Lead	Alternate	Locale
Hailey Armstrong	Melissa Gannon	Andréanne Janelle-Gravel	Pamela Nugent	Sarah Throop	Montreal, Quebec
Christina Black	Jill Brothers	Marlee Powers	Lindsey Burgess		Halifax, Nova Scotia
Kate Cameron	Laurie St-Georges	Emily Riley	Émilia Gagné		Laval, Quebec
Grace Cave	Emily Deschenes	Madison Fisher	Melanie Ebach		North Dundas, Ontario
Elizabeth Cousins	Annmarie Dubberstein	Allison Howell	Elizabeth Janiak		(United States) Nashua, New Hampshire
Kerri Einarson	Shannon Birchard	Karlee Burgess	Jocelyn Peterman		Gimli, Manitoba
Mélodie Forsythe	Rebecca Watson	Carly Smith	Jenna Campbell		Fredericton, New Brunswick
Jolianne Fortin	Emy Lafrance	Megan Lafrance	Mégane Fortin		Jonquière, Quebec
Carly Howard	Grace Holyoke	Emma Artichuk	Alice Holyoke		Toronto, Ontario
Corrie Hürlimann	Marina Lörtscher	Celine Schwizgebel	Isabel Einspieler		Zug, Switzerland
Brooklyn Ideson	Lauren Evason	Aila Thompson	Clara Dissanayake		London, Ontario
Kayla MacMillan	Val Sweeting	Lindsay Dubue	Lauren Lenentine		Victoria, British Columbia
Alina Pätz	Selina Witschonke	Stefanie Berset	Renée Frigo		Geneva, Switzerland
Xenia Schwaller	Selina Gafner	Fabienne Rieder	Selina Rychiger		Zurich, Switzerland
Kayla Skrlik	Myla Plett	Sarah Koltun	Samantha Fisher		Calgary, Alberta
Miyu Ueno	Asuka Kanai	– (Note: Team Ueno played with three players.)	Yui Ueno		Karuizawa, Japan
Dominique Vivier	Ava Acres	Paige Bown	Sadie McCutcheon		Navan, Ontario
Giulia Zardini Lacedelli	Elena Mathis	Marta Lo Deserto	Rachele Scalesse		Cortina d'Ampezzo, Italy

=== Round robin standings ===
Final Round Robin Standings

Key
Teams to Playoffs

Pool A	W	L	PF	PA
(Switzerland) Xenia Schwaller	5	0	31	20
(Italy) Giulia Zardini Lacedelli	3	2	31	20
(Quebec) Jolianne Fortin	3	2	26	26
(Nova Scotia) Christina Black	2	3	28	23
(Ontario) Carly Howard	1	4	23	32
(New Brunswick) Mélodie Forsythe	1	4	14	32

Pool B	W	L	PF	PA
(Switzerland) Corrie Hürlimann	4	1	38	27
(Manitoba) Kerri Einarson	3	2	39	25
(Japan) Miyu Ueno	3	2	25	27
(Quebec) Kate Cameron	3	2	27	24
(Quebec) Hailey Armstrong	1	4	17	27
(Ontario) Grace Cave	1	4	22	38

Pool C	W	L	PF	PA
(Alberta) Kayla Skrlik	5	0	33	10
(Switzerland) Alina Pätz	4	1	33	12
(British Columbia) Kayla MacMillan	3	2	21	18
(United States) Elizabeth Cousins	2	3	24	26
(Ontario) Dominique Vivier	1	4	13	33
(Ontario) Brooklyn Ideson	0	5	13	38

=== Round robin results ===
All draw times are listed in Eastern Time (UTC−04:00).

==== Draw 1 ====
Wednesday, September 16, 5:00 pm

Sheet 6	1	2	3	4	5	6	7	8	9	Final
(Switzerland) Corrie Hürlimann 🔨	2	0	0	2	3	0	2	0	1	10
(Ontario) Grace Cave	0	2	5	0	0	1	0	1	0	9

==== Draw 2 ====
Wednesday, September 16, 8:00 pm

Sheet 2	1	2	3	4	5	6	7	8	Final
(Japan) Miyu Ueno 🔨	2	2	0	2	0	0	1	X	7
(Quebec) Hailey Armstrong	0	0	1	0	1	1	0	X	3

Sheet 3	1	2	3	4	5	6	7	8	Final
(Switzerland) Alina Pätz	1	0	0	2	0	0	2	X	5
(United States) Elizabeth Cousins 🔨	0	1	0	0	1	0	0	X	2

Sheet 4	1	2	3	4	5	6	7	8	Final
(British Columbia) Kayla MacMillan	1	0	0	1	0	0	0	X	2
(Alberta) Kayla Skrlik 🔨	0	1	1	0	2	0	1	X	5

Sheet 5	1	2	3	4	5	6	7	8	Final
(Switzerland) Xenia Schwaller 🔨	1	0	0	0	2	0	2	0	5
(Ontario) Carly Howard	0	0	1	2	0	0	0	1	4

Sheet 6	1	2	3	4	5	6	7	8	9	Final
(Ontario) Brooklyn Ideson	0	1	0	1	0	0	2	1	0	5
(Ontario) Dominique Vivier 🔨	1	0	1	0	1	2	0	0	1	6

==== Draw 3 ====
Thursday, September 17, 8:00 am

Sheet 4	1	2	3	4	5	6	7	8	Final
(Italy) Giulia Zardini Lacedelli 🔨	1	3	1	3	X	X	X	X	8
(New Brunswick) Mélodie Forsythe	0	0	0	0	X	X	X	X	0

Sheet 5	1	2	3	4	5	6	7	8	9	Final
(Manitoba) Kerri Einarson	0	0	3	0	0	0	5	0	0	8
(Switzerland) Corrie Hürlimann 🔨	1	0	0	2	0	4	0	1	1	9

==== Draw 4 ====
Thursday, September 17, 11:00 am

Sheet 1	1	2	3	4	5	6	7	8	Final
(Switzerland) Alina Pätz	0	0	0	0	0	X	X	X	0
(Alberta) Kayla Skrlik 🔨	0	0	3	1	4	X	X	X	8

Sheet 3	1	2	3	4	5	6	7	8	Final
(Switzerland) Xenia Schwaller	2	0	0	0	0	1	0	3	6
(Quebec) Jolianne Fortin 🔨	0	1	0	1	0	0	1	0	3

Sheet 4	1	2	3	4	5	6	7	8	Final
(British Columbia) Kayla MacMillan	2	0	0	0	3	1	0	1	7
(Ontario) Brooklyn Ideson 🔨	0	0	0	2	0	0	1	0	3

Sheet 6	1	2	3	4	5	6	7	8	Final
(Quebec) Kate Cameron 🔨	1	0	0	1	0	0	1	1	4
(Quebec) Hailey Armstrong	0	1	0	0	0	1	0	0	2

==== Draw 5 ====
Thursday, September 17, 2:00 pm

Sheet 3	1	2	3	4	5	6	7	8	Final
(Manitoba) Kerri Einarson 🔨	2	0	2	4	1	X	X	X	9
(Ontario) Grace Cave	0	1	0	0	0	X	X	X	1

Sheet 6	1	2	3	4	5	6	7	8	Final
(Nova Scotia) Christina Black 🔨	1	1	3	0	4	0	X	X	9
(New Brunswick) Mélodie Forsythe	0	0	0	1	0	1	X	X	2

==== Draw 6 ====
Thursday, September 17, 5:00 pm

Sheet 1	1	2	3	4	5	6	7	8	Final
(Japan) Miyu Ueno	0	0	1	1	0	0	0	X	2
(Quebec) Kate Cameron 🔨	0	1	0	0	3	2	1	X	7

Sheet 4	1	2	3	4	5	6	7	8	Final
(Switzerland) Corrie Hürlimann 🔨	0	1	2	0	1	2	0	X	6
(Quebec) Hailey Armstrong	0	0	0	1	0	0	1	X	2

Sheet 6	1	2	3	4	5	6	7	8	Final
(Italy) Giulia Zardini Lacedelli 🔨	0	0	3	0	0	1	0	2	6
(Ontario) Carly Howard	0	0	0	2	1	0	2	0	5

==== Draw 7 ====
Thursday, September 17, 8:00 pm

Sheet 1	1	2	3	4	5	6	7	8	Final
(British Columbia) Kayla MacMillan 🔨	0	0	1	0	0	1	1	1	4
(Ontario) Dominique Vivier	0	0	0	1	0	0	0	0	1

Sheet 2	1	2	3	4	5	6	7	8	Final
(Switzerland) Alina Pätz 🔨	4	0	2	5	X	X	X	X	11
(Ontario) Brooklyn Ideson	0	1	0	0	X	X	X	X	1

Sheet 4	1	2	3	4	5	6	7	8	Final
(Nova Scotia) Christina Black 🔨	0	1	0	0	0	0	1	X	2
(Quebec) Jolianne Fortin	0	0	0	2	1	1	0	X	4

Sheet 6	1	2	3	4	5	6	7	8	Final
(Alberta) Kayla Skrlik	0	0	3	0	0	0	3	1	7
(United States) Elizabeth Cousins 🔨	1	1	0	1	1	1	0	0	5

==== Draw 8 ====
Friday, September 18, 8:00 am

Sheet 1	1	2	3	4	5	6	7	8	Final
(Switzerland) Xenia Schwaller 🔨	1	2	0	1	0	1	0	2	7
(Italy) Giulia Zardini Lacedelli	0	0	1	0	2	0	1	0	4

Sheet 2	1	2	3	4	5	6	7	8	Final
(Ontario) Carly Howard	1	0	0	2	1	0	1	0	5
(New Brunswick) Mélodie Forsythe 🔨	0	0	2	0	0	1	0	0	3

==== Draw 9 ====
Friday, September 18, 11:00 am

Sheet 3	1	2	3	4	5	6	7	8	Final
(Quebec) Kate Cameron	0	0	0	0	1	0	3	0	4
(Ontario) Grace Cave 🔨	1	1	1	1	0	1	0	1	6

Sheet 5	1	2	3	4	5	6	7	8	Final
(Manitoba) Kerri Einarson	0	3	4	3	1	X	X	X	11
(Japan) Miyu Ueno 🔨	2	0	0	0	0	X	X	X	2

==== Draw 10 ====
Friday, September 18, 2:00 pm

Sheet 1	1	2	3	4	5	6	7	8	Final
(Switzerland) Xenia Schwaller 🔨	1	0	2	0	2	2	0	X	7
(Nova Scotia) Christina Black	0	1	0	3	0	0	2	X	6

Sheet 3	1	2	3	4	5	6	7	8	Final
(United States) Elizabeth Cousins 🔨	2	0	3	0	0	1	0	X	6
(Ontario) Brooklyn Ideson	0	1	0	3	0	0	0	X	4

Sheet 4	1	2	3	4	5	6	7	8	Final
(Alberta) Kayla Skrlik	1	0	2	0	0	1	0	1	5
(Ontario) Dominique Vivier 🔨	0	0	0	1	1	0	1	0	3

Sheet 5	1	2	3	4	5	6	7	8	Final
(Switzerland) Alina Pätz 🔨	1	1	0	0	0	2	2	X	6
(British Columbia) Kayla MacMillan	0	0	1	0	0	0	0	X	1

Sheet 6	1	2	3	4	5	6	7	8	9	Final
(New Brunswick) Mélodie Forsythe 🔨	2	0	0	0	0	2	0	0	2	6
(Quebec) Jolianne Fortin	0	0	1	0	1	0	1	1	0	4

==== Draw 11 ====
Friday, September 18, 5:00 pm

Sheet 3	1	2	3	4	5	6	7	8	Final
(Manitoba) Kerri Einarson	0	2	0	0	2	0	0	1	5
(Quebec) Hailey Armstrong 🔨	0	0	1	1	0	1	0	0	3

==== Draw 12 ====
Friday, September 18, 8:00 pm

Sheet 2	1	2	3	4	5	6	7	8	Final
(Japan) Miyu Ueno 🔨	1	0	2	2	2	1	X	X	8
(Ontario) Grace Cave	0	1	0	0	0	0	X	X	1

Sheet 4	1	2	3	4	5	6	7	8	Final
(Switzerland) Corrie Hürlimann 🔨	0	2	2	0	0	1	3	X	8
(Quebec) Kate Cameron	1	0	0	1	0	0	0	X	2

Sheet 5	1	2	3	4	5	6	7	8	Final
(Nova Scotia) Christina Black 🔨	0	0	2	0	0	X	X	X	2
(Italy) Giulia Zardini Lacedelli	1	2	0	1	4	X	X	X	8

Sheet 6	1	2	3	4	5	6	7	8	Final
(Ontario) Carly Howard	2	0	2	0	2	0	1	0	7
(Quebec) Jolianne Fortin 🔨	0	2	0	2	0	4	0	1	9

==== Draw 13 ====
Saturday, September 19, 8:00 am

Sheet 1	1	2	3	4	5	6	7	8	Final
(British Columbia) Kayla MacMillan	0	2	0	2	1	0	2	X	7
(United States) Elizabeth Cousins 🔨	0	0	2	0	0	1	0	X	3

Sheet 2	1	2	3	4	5	6	7	8	Final
(Switzerland) Alina Pätz	2	2	3	4	X	X	X	X	11
(Ontario) Dominique Vivier 🔨	0	0	0	0	X	X	X	X	0

Sheet 3	1	2	3	4	5	6	7	8	Final
(Switzerland) Xenia Schwaller	0	2	0	3	0	1	0	X	6
(New Brunswick) Mélodie Forsythe 🔨	0	0	1	0	1	0	1	X	3

Sheet 6	1	2	3	4	5	6	7	8	Final
(Alberta) Kayla Skrlik	2	2	3	1	X	X	X	X	8
(Ontario) Brooklyn Ideson 🔨	0	0	0	0	X	X	X	X	0

==== Draw 14 ====
Saturday, September 19, 11:00 am

Sheet 1	1	2	3	4	5	6	7	8	Final
(Ontario) Grace Cave	0	1	0	2	0	1	0	1	5
(Quebec) Hailey Armstrong 🔨	3	0	2	0	0	0	2	0	7

Sheet 2	1	2	3	4	5	6	7	8	9	Final
(Italy) Giulia Zardini Lacedelli 🔨	2	0	1	1	0	0	0	1	0	5
(Quebec) Jolianne Fortin	0	2	0	0	2	1	0	0	1	6

==== Draw 15 ====
Saturday, September 19, 2:00 pm

Sheet 1	1	2	3	4	5	6	7	8	9	Final
(Japan) Miyu Ueno	0	0	1	1	1	0	2	0	1	6
(Switzerland) Corrie Hürlimann 🔨	2	0	0	0	0	2	0	1	0	5

Sheet 2	1	2	3	4	5	6	7	8	Final
(Nova Scotia) Christina Black 🔨	0	2	2	0	1	2	2	X	9
(Ontario) Carly Howard	0	0	0	2	0	0	0	X	2

Sheet 5	1	2	3	4	5	6	7	8	Final
(Manitoba) Kerri Einarson	0	1	0	3	0	2	0	0	6
(Quebec) Kate Cameron 🔨	1	0	2	0	1	0	3	3	10

Sheet 6	1	2	3	4	5	6	7	8	Final
(United States) Elizabeth Cousins 🔨	1	0	4	1	0	1	1	X	8
(Ontario) Dominique Vivier	0	1	0	0	2	0	0	X	3

=== Playoffs ===
Quarterfinals
1	(Switzerland) Xenia Schwaller	8
8	(Quebec) Jolianne Fortin	3
4	(Switzerland) Corrie Hürlimann	3
5	(Italy) Giulia Zardini Lacedelli	6
2	(Alberta) Kayla Skrlik	4
7	(Japan) Miyu Ueno	7
3	(Switzerland) Alina Pätz	8
6	(Manitoba) Kerri Einarson	4

Semifinals
1	(Switzerland) Xenia Schwaller	8
5	(Italy) Giulia Zardini Lacedelli	6
7	(Japan) Miyu Ueno	4
3	(Switzerland) Alina Pätz	8

Final
1	(Switzerland) Xenia Schwaller	3
3	(Switzerland) Alina Pätz	4

==== Quarterfinals ====
Saturday, September 19, 8:00 pm

Sheet 2	1	2	3	4	5	6	7	8	Final
(Switzerland) Xenia Schwaller 🔨	1	1	0	3	0	3	X	X	8
(Quebec) Jolianne Fortin	0	0	2	0	1	0	X	X	3

Sheet 3	1	2	3	4	5	6	7	8	Final
(Alberta) Kayla Skrlik 🔨	0	0	0	2	0	2	0	X	4
(Japan) Miyu Ueno	0	2	2	0	1	0	2	X	7

Sheet 4	1	2	3	4	5	6	7	8	Final
(Switzerland) Alina Pätz 🔨	2	0	0	2	1	0	3	X	8
(Manitoba) Kerri Einarson	0	1	2	0	0	1	0	X	4

Sheet 5	1	2	3	4	5	6	7	8	Final
(Switzerland) Corrie Hürlimann 🔨	1	0	0	1	0	1	0	X	3
(Italy) Giulia Zardini Lacedelli	0	0	2	0	1	0	3	X	6

==== Semifinals ====
Sunday, September 20, 8:30 am

Sheet 2	1	2	3	4	5	6	7	8	Final
(Japan) Miyu Ueno	0	0	1	1	1	1	0	X	4
(Switzerland) Alina Pätz 🔨	2	2	0	0	0	0	4	X	8

Sheet 3	1	2	3	4	5	6	7	8	Final
(Switzerland) Xenia Schwaller 🔨	3	0	0	1	0	3	0	1	8
(Italy) Giulia Zardini Lacedelli	0	1	1	0	2	0	2	0	6

==== Final ====
Sunday, September 20, 12:00 pm

Sheet 5	1	2	3	4	5	6	7	8	Final
(Switzerland) Xenia Schwaller 🔨	0	0	1	0	1	0	0	1	3
(Switzerland) Alina Pätz	0	1	0	2	0	0	1	0	4
