= 2010 AMJ Campbell Shorty Jenkins Classic =

- Host city: Brockville, Ontario
- Arena: Brockville Country Club
- Dates: Sept. 16-19
- Men's winner: Jean-Michel Ménard
- Curling club: CC Victoria, Sainte-Foy & CC Etchemin, Saint-Romuald
- Skip: Jean-Michel Ménard
- Third: Martin Crête
- Second: Éric Sylvain
- Lead: Jean Gagnon
- Finalist: Brad Jacobs
- Women's winner: Rachel Homan
- Curling club: Ottawa CC, Ottawa
- Skip: Rachel Homan
- Third: Emma Miskew
- Second: Alison Kreviazuk
- Lead: Lisa Weagle
- Finalist: Tracy Horgan

The 2010 AMJ Campbell Shorty Jenkins Classic was held September 16–19, 2010 at the Brockville Country Club in Brockville, Ontario. It was on the second week of the men's World Curling Tour and the first week of the Women's tour. It was one of two WCT events held that weekend (the other was The Shoot-Out).

The total purse for the men's event was $40,700, while the total purse for the women's event was $16,400.

The event tested a new positioning of the hack, the starting block for curlers. For the tournament, the hacks were located right next each other, instead of the small gap that exists normally.

== Men's ==
=== Teams ===
- (Ontario) Mark Bice
- (Quebec) Pierre Charette
- (Ontario) Dave Collyer
- (Ontario) Denis Cordick
- (Quebec) Robert Desjardins
- (Ontario) John Epping
- (United States) Pete Fenson
- (Quebec) Martin Ferland
- (Ontario) Keil Gallinger
- (Ontario) Chris Gardner
- (Russia) Jason Gunnlaugson
- (Newfoundland and Labrador) Brad Gushue
- (Quebec) Guy Hemmings
- (Ontario) Glenn Howard
- (Ontario) Brad Jacobs
- (Ontario) Dale Matchett
- (Ontario) Jeff McCrady
- (Quebec) Jean-Michel Ménard
- (Ontario) Matt Paul
- (Ontario) Ian Robertson
- (Manitoba) Jeff Stoughton
- (Ontario) Ken Thompson
- (Ontario) Wayne Tuck, Jr.
- (United States) Tyler George

=== Draw ===
Group A	W	L
(Ontario) Jacobs	5	0
(Ontario) Howard	4	1
(Ontario) Epping	2	3
(Quebec) Desjardins	2	3
(United States) George	2	3
(Ontario) Thompson	0	5

Group B	W	L
(Newfoundland and Labrador) Gushue	5	0
(United States) Fenson	4	1
(Quebec) Ferland	3	2
(Ontario) Robertson	2	3
(Quebec) Hemmings	1	4
(Ontario) Collyer	0	5

Group C	W	L
(Manitoba) Stoughton	5	0
(Quebec) Charette	3	2
(Ontario) Tuck	3	2
(Russia) Gunnlaugson	2	3
(Ontario) Gallinger	1	4
(Ontario) Paul	1	4

Group D	W	L
(Quebec) Ménard	5	0
(Ontario) Gardner	4	1
(Ontario) Bice	2	3
(Ontario) Matchett	2	3
(Ontario) McCrady	2	3
(Ontario) Cordick	0	5

=== Playoffs ===
Quarterfinals
(Ontario) Jacobs	8
(Ontario) Gardner	1
(Newfoundland and Labrador) Gushue	6
(Quebec) Charette	2
(Manitoba) Stoughton	5
(United States) Fenson	0
(Quebec) Ménard	9
(Ontario) Howard	4

Semifinals
(Ontario) Jacobs	4
(Newfoundland and Labrador) Gushue	3
(Manitoba) Stoughton	4
(Quebec) Ménard	5

Finals
(Ontario) Jacobs	4
(Quebec) Ménard	6

== Women's ==
=== Teams ===
- (Quebec) Ève Bélisle
- (Ontario) Chrissy Cadorin
- (Ontario) Lisa Farnell
- (Ontario) Jacqueline Harrison
- (Ontario) Rachel Homan
- (Ontario) Tracy Horgan
- (Ontario) Barb Kelly
- (Quebec) Marie-France Larouche
- (Ontario) Carrie Lindner
- (Quebec) Kimberly Mastine
- (Ontario) Robyn Mattie
- (Quebec) Chantal Osborne

=== Draw ===
Group A	W	L
(Ontario) Harrison	4	1
(Ontario) Farnell	3	2
(Quebec) Larouche	3	2
(Quebec) Bélisle	2	3
(Ontario) Mattie	2	3
(Ontario) Lindner	1	4

Group B	W	L
(Ontario) Homan	5	0
(Ontario) Horgan	4	1
(Ontario) Cadorin	3	2
(Quebec) Osborne	2	3
(Quebec) Mastine	1	4
(Ontario) Kelly	0	5

=== Playoffs ===
Semifinals
(Ontario) Homan	8
(Ontario) Farnell	2
(Ontario) Harrison	3
(Ontario) Horgan	6

Finals
(Ontario) Homan	8
(Ontario) Horgan	3
