= 2026 GSOC Invitational =

Grand Slam of Curling event

2026 Co-op Invitational
- Host city: Victoria, British Columbia
- Arena: Save-On-Foods Memorial Centre
- Dates: October 13–18
- Men's winner: (Switzerland) Team Schwaller
- Curling club: CC3C Genève, Geneva
- Skip: Yannick Schwaller
- Fourth: Benoît Schwarz-van Berkel
- Second: Sven Michel
- Lead: Pablo Lachat-Couchepin
- Coach: Glenn Howard
- Finalist: (Norway) Magnus Ramsfjell
- Women's winner: (Manitoba) Team Einarson
- Curling club: Gimli CC, Gimli
- Skip: Kerri Einarson
- Third: Shannon Birchard
- Second: Karlee Burgess
- Lead: Jocelyn Peterman
- Finalist: (South Korea) Team Kang

The 2026 Co-op Invitational was held from October 13 to 18 at the Save-On-Foods Memorial Centre in Victoria, British Columbia. It was the first Grand Slam event of the 2026–27 curling season.

== Qualification ==
With this being the first Grand Slam of the new Olympic quadrennial, the qualification process was different than the rest of the Slams with 12 open invites being sent out. The four remaining spots were chosen through the newly created GSOC Satellite Event series. The winners of four select tour events received the final invitations to the Co-op Invitational. In the event that the winning team was already qualified, the next highest finishing team at the event was invited until the spot was filled.

=== Men ===
Means of Qualification	Vacancies	Qualified
Open Invites	12	(Alberta) Brendan Bottcher (United States) Daniel Casper (Manitoba) Matt Dunstone (Sweden) Oskar Eriksson (Scotland) Grant Hardie (Alberta) Brad Jacobs (Alberta) Kevin Koe (Scotland) Bruce Mouat (Norway) Magnus Ramsfjell (Scotland) Kyle Waddell (Switzerland) Yannick Schwaller (Japan) Tsuyoshi Yamaguchi
Euro Super Series	1	(Italy) ~~Stefano Spiller~~ (Scotland) Orrin Carson
AMJ Shorty Jenkins Classic	1	(Manitoba) John Epping
Karuizawa International	1	(Japan) Takumi Maeda
Prestige Hotels & Resorts Curling Classic	1	(Switzerland) Marco Hösli
TOTAL	16	

=== Women ===
Means of Qualification	Vacancies	Qualified
Open Invites	12	(Denmark) Madeleine Dupont (Manitoba) Kerri Einarson (Japan) Satsuki Fujisawa (South Korea) Gim Eun-ji (Sweden) Anna Hasselborg (Ontario) Rachel Homan (British Columbia) Kayla MacMillan (Japan) Miku Nihira (Switzerland) Alina Pätz (British Columbia) Taylor Reese-Hansen (Switzerland) Xenia Schwaller (Sweden) Isabella Wranå
Euro Super Series	1	(Italy) Giulia Zardini Lacedelli
AMJ Shorty Jenkins Classic	1	(Japan) Miyu Ueno
Karuizawa International	1	(South Korea) Team Kang
Prestige Hotels & Resorts Curling Classic	1	(Japan) Yuina Miura
TOTAL	16	

== Men ==
=== Teams ===
The teams are listed as follows:

Skip	Third	Second	Lead	Alternate	Locale
Brendan Bottcher	Jake Horgan	Tanner Horgan	Geoff Walker		Edmonton, Alberta
Orrin Carson	Logan Carson	Archie Hyslop	Charlie Gibb		Dumfries, Scotland
Daniel Casper	Luc Violette	Ben Richardson	Aidan Oldenburg		(United States) Chaska, Minnesota
Matt Dunstone	Colton Lott	Mark Nichols	Ryan Harnden		Winnipeg, Manitoba
John Epping	B. J. Neufeld	Ryan Wiebe	Ian McMillan		Winnipeg, Manitoba
Oskar Eriksson	Rasmus Wranå	Simon Olofsson	Christoffer Sundgren		Karlstad, Sweden
Ross Whyte (Fourth)	Grant Hardie (Skip)	Craig Waddell	Euan Kyle		Stirling, Scotland
Philipp Hösli (Fourth)	Marco Hösli (Skip)	Simon Gloor	Justin Hausherr		Glarus, Switzerland
Brad Jacobs	Marc Kennedy	Brett Gallant	Ben Hebert		Calgary, Alberta
Kevin Koe	Johnson Tao	Aaron Sluchinski	Karrick Martin		Calgary, Alberta
Takumi Maeda	Hiroki Maeda	Uryu Kamikawa	Gakuto Tokoro	Ryotaro Shukuya	Tokoro, Japan
Bruce Mouat	Robin Brydone	Bobby Lammie	Hammy McMillan Jr.		Stirling, Scotland
Magnus Ramsfjell	Steffen Walstad	Bendik Ramsfjell	Mathias Brænden		Trondheim, Norway
Benoît Schwarz-van Berkel (Fourth)	Yannick Schwaller (Skip)	Sven Michel	Pablo Lachat-Couchepin		Geneva, Switzerland
Kyle Waddell	Mark Watt	Duncan McFadzean (Note: Duncan McFadzean spared for Angus Bryce who was recovering from an injury.)	Blair Haswell		Hamilton, Scotland
Riku Yanagisawa (Fourth)	Tsuyoshi Yamaguchi (Skip)	Takeru Yamamoto	Satoshi Koizumi		Karuizawa, Japan

=== Round robin standings ===
Final Round Robin Standings

Key
Teams to Playoffs

Pool A	W	SOW	SOL	L	PF	PA	Pts	LSD
(Norway) Magnus Ramsfjell	3	0	1	0	26	19	10	26.8
(Switzerland) Marco Hösli	3	0	0	1	22	16	9	6.5
(Scotland) Bruce Mouat	1	0	0	3	17	22	3	21.3
(Scotland) Kyle Waddell	1	0	0	3	21	28	3	84.9

Pool B	W	SOW	SOL	L	PF	PA	Pts	LSD
(Alberta) Brad Jacobs	4	0	0	0	29	13	12	65.9
(Alberta) Brendan Bottcher	2	0	1	1	19	20	7	49.9
(Scotland) Orrin Carson	2	0	0	2	22	20	6	81.9
(Sweden) Oskar Eriksson	0	0	0	4	16	30	0	4.3

Pool C	W	SOW	SOL	L	PF	PA	Pts	LSD
(Manitoba) Matt Dunstone	2	1	0	1	24	22	8	5.7
(United States) Daniel Casper	2	0	0	2	29	25	6	21.6
(Japan) Takumi Maeda	2	0	0	2	24	22	6	152.5
(Japan) Tsuyoshi Yamaguchi	1	0	0	3	21	32	3	47.4

Pool D	W	SOW	SOL	L	PF	PA	Pts	LSD
(Switzerland) Yannick Schwaller	2	1	0	1	24	20	8	10.7
(Scotland) Grant Hardie	2	1	0	1	25	18	8	38.7
(Manitoba) John Epping	2	0	1	1	26	20	7	11.4
(Alberta) Kevin Koe	0	0	0	4	11	29	0	28.1

=== Round robin results ===
All draw times are listed in Pacific Time (UTC−08:00).

==== Draw 1 ====
Tuesday, October 13, 8:30 am

Sheet C	1	2	3	4	5	6	7	8	Final
(United States) Daniel Casper 🔨	2	0	2	0	3	0	3	X	10
(Japan) Tsuyoshi Yamaguchi	0	3	0	1	0	2	0	X	6

Sheet D	1	2	3	4	5	6	7	8	Final
(Sweden) Oskar Eriksson 🔨	1	0	0	1	1	0	1	0	4
(Alberta) Brendan Bottcher	0	2	1	0	0	2	0	1	6

==== Draw 2 ====
Tuesday, October 13, 12:00 pm

Sheet C	1	2	3	4	5	6	7	8	Final
(Scotland) Bruce Mouat	0	1	0	1	0	1	0	X	3
(Switzerland) Marco Hösli 🔨	1	0	1	0	2	0	2	X	6

Sheet D	1	2	3	4	5	6	7	8	Final
(Switzerland) Yannick Schwaller 🔨	0	3	2	0	0	1	0	1	7
(Manitoba) John Epping	1	0	0	0	2	0	3	0	6

==== Draw 3 ====
Tuesday, October 13, 3:30 pm

Sheet B	1	2	3	4	5	6	7	8	Final
(Scotland) Grant Hardie	0	2	0	2	1	0	4	X	9
(Alberta) Kevin Koe 🔨	1	0	2	0	0	1	0	X	4

Sheet C	1	2	3	4	5	6	7	8	Final
(Manitoba) Matt Dunstone 🔨	1	0	1	0	0	0	1	X	3
(Japan) Takumi Maeda	0	1	0	2	1	2	0	X	6

==== Draw 4 ====
Tuesday, October 13, 7:00 pm

Sheet C	1	2	3	4	5	6	7	8	Final
(Scotland) Kyle Waddell	0	2	0	2	0	1	0	1	6
(Norway) Magnus Ramsfjell 🔨	5	0	1	0	1	0	1	0	8

Sheet D	1	2	3	4	5	6	7	8	Final
(Alberta) Brad Jacobs	0	1	0	2	1	2	0	X	6
(Scotland) Orrin Carson 🔨	1	0	1	0	0	0	1	X	3

==== Draw 5 ====
Wednesday, October 14, 8:30 am

Sheet A	1	2	3	4	5	6	7	8	9	Final
(Scotland) Grant Hardie 🔨	2	0	1	0	0	1	0	1	1	6
(Manitoba) John Epping	0	1	0	2	0	0	2	0	0	5

Sheet B	1	2	3	4	5	6	7	8	Final
(United States) Daniel Casper 🔨	3	0	2	0	1	0	3	X	9
(Japan) Takumi Maeda	0	2	0	0	0	1	0	X	3

==== Draw 6 ====
Wednesday, October 14, 12:00 pm

Sheet A	1	2	3	4	5	6	7	8	Final
(Scotland) Kyle Waddell 🔨	1	0	1	0	0	0	2	0	4
(Switzerland) Marco Hösli	0	1	0	1	1	1	0	1	5

Sheet D	1	2	3	4	5	6	7	8	Final
(Scotland) Bruce Mouat	0	1	0	0	1	0	X	X	2
(Norway) Magnus Ramsfjell 🔨	2	0	2	1	0	2	X	X	7

==== Draw 7 ====
Wednesday, October 14, 3:30 pm

Sheet A	1	2	3	4	5	6	7	8	Final
(Switzerland) Yannick Schwaller	1	0	3	3	0	1	X	X	8
(Alberta) Kevin Koe 🔨	0	1	0	0	1	0	X	X	2

Sheet B	1	2	3	4	5	6	7	8	Final
(Sweden) Oskar Eriksson 🔨	1	0	2	0	2	0	1	0	6
(Scotland) Orrin Carson	0	2	0	1	0	2	0	2	7

Sheet C	1	2	3	4	5	6	7	8	Final
(Alberta) Brad Jacobs 🔨	1	0	2	0	1	2	0	X	6
(Alberta) Brendan Bottcher	0	1	0	2	0	0	0	X	3

Sheet D	1	2	3	4	5	6	7	8	Final
(Manitoba) Matt Dunstone 🔨	1	0	2	0	1	0	3	X	7
(Japan) Tsuyoshi Yamaguchi	0	2	0	1	0	1	0	X	4

==== Draw 9 ====
Thursday, October 15, 8:00 am

Sheet A	1	2	3	4	5	6	7	8	Final
(Alberta) Brendan Bottcher 🔨	2	0	0	1	0	0	0	2	5
(Scotland) Orrin Carson	0	1	0	0	1	1	1	0	4

Sheet B	1	2	3	4	5	6	7	8	9	Final
(Switzerland) Yannick Schwaller 🔨	2	1	0	1	0	0	2	0	1	7
(Norway) Magnus Ramsfjell	0	0	1	0	2	1	0	2	0	6

Sheet C	1	2	3	4	5	6	7	8	Final
(Scotland) Kyle Waddell	0	0	2	0	3	0	0	0	5
(Manitoba) John Epping 🔨	2	1	0	2	0	1	1	3	10

Sheet D	1	2	3	4	5	6	7	8	Final
(Scotland) Grant Hardie	0	0	2	1	0	0	1	0	4
(Switzerland) Marco Hösli 🔨	2	2	0	0	1	1	0	1	7

==== Draw 10 ====
Thursday, October 15, 11:30 am

Sheet B	1	2	3	4	5	6	7	8	Final
(Sweden) Oskar Eriksson	0	1	0	2	0	X	X	X	3
(Japan) Takumi Maeda 🔨	2	0	3	0	4	X	X	X	9

Sheet C	1	2	3	4	5	6	7	8	Final
(Manitoba) Matt Dunstone 🔨	2	0	3	0	0	1	0	2	8
(United States) Daniel Casper	0	3	0	0	1	0	3	0	7

==== Draw 11 ====
Thursday, October 15, 3:00 pm

Sheet B	1	2	3	4	5	6	7	8	Final
(Alberta) Brad Jacobs	0	3	0	2	0	1	3	X	9
(Japan) Tsuyoshi Yamaguchi 🔨	2	0	2	0	0	0	0	X	4

==== Draw 12 ====
Thursday, October 15, 7:00 pm

Sheet C	1	2	3	4	5	6	7	8	Final
(Scotland) Bruce Mouat 🔨	2	1	0	3	0	1	X	X	7
(Alberta) Kevin Koe	0	0	2	0	1	0	X	X	3

==== Draw 13 ====
Friday, October 16, 8:30 am

Sheet A	1	2	3	4	5	6	7	8	Final
(Scotland) Bruce Mouat 🔨	0	0	2	0	1	0	2	0	5
(Scotland) Kyle Waddell	1	2	0	1	0	1	0	1	6

Sheet D	1	2	3	4	5	6	7	8	Final
(Japan) Tsuyoshi Yamaguchi 🔨	2	0	0	1	0	3	0	1	7
(Japan) Takumi Maeda	0	1	1	0	2	0	2	0	6

==== Draw 14 ====
Friday, October 16, 12:00 pm

Sheet A	1	2	3	4	5	6	7	8	Final
(Norway) Magnus Ramsfjell	0	1	1	0	2	0	0	1	5
(Switzerland) Marco Hösli 🔨	1	0	0	1	0	1	1	0	4

Sheet C	1	2	3	4	5	6	7	8	Final
(Switzerland) Yannick Schwaller 🔨	1	0	0	1	0	0	0	0	2
(Scotland) Grant Hardie	0	1	1	0	0	1	1	2	6

Sheet D	1	2	3	4	5	6	7	8	Final
(Alberta) Kevin Koe	0	1	0	0	0	1	0	X	2
(Manitoba) John Epping 🔨	1	0	0	2	1	0	1	X	5

==== Draw 15 ====
Friday, October 16, 3:30 pm

Sheet D	1	2	3	4	5	6	7	8	Final
(United States) Daniel Casper 🔨	2	0	0	0	1	0	X	X	3
(Scotland) Orrin Carson	0	2	1	1	0	4	X	X	8

==== Draw 16 ====
Friday, October 16, 7:00 pm

Sheet B	1	2	3	4	5	6	7	8	9	Final
(Manitoba) Matt Dunstone	0	1	0	1	0	2	1	0	1	6
(Alberta) Brendan Bottcher 🔨	1	0	1	0	2	0	0	1	0	5

Sheet C	1	2	3	4	5	6	7	8	Final
(Alberta) Brad Jacobs	0	2	1	1	0	4	X	X	8
(Sweden) Oskar Eriksson 🔨	1	0	0	0	2	0	X	X	3

=== Playoffs ===
Quarterfinals
1	(Alberta) Brad Jacobs	5
8	(Alberta) Brendan Bottcher	3
4	(Manitoba) Matt Dunstone	3
5	(Switzerland) Yannick Schwaller	5
2	(Norway) Magnus Ramsfjell	8
7	(Manitoba) John Epping	2
3	(Switzerland) Marco Hösli	6
6	(Scotland) Grant Hardie	5

Semifinals
1	(Alberta) Brad Jacobs	5
5	(Switzerland) Yannick Schwaller	6
2	(Norway) Magnus Ramsfjell	7
3	(Switzerland) Marco Hösli	4

Final
5	(Switzerland) Yannick Schwaller	7
2	(Norway) Magnus Ramsfjell	3

==== Quarterfinals ====
Saturday, October 17, 4:00 pm

Sheet A	1	2	3	4	5	6	7	8	Final
(Switzerland) Marco Hösli 🔨	1	1	0	1	1	0	0	2	6
(Scotland) Grant Hardie	0	0	2	0	0	2	1	0	5

Sheet B	1	2	3	4	5	6	7	8	Final
(Alberta) Brad Jacobs 🔨	1	0	2	0	1	0	1	X	5
(Alberta) Brendan Bottcher	0	1	0	1	0	1	0	X	3

Sheet C	1	2	3	4	5	6	7	8	Final
(Norway) Magnus Ramsfjell 🔨	1	2	0	1	1	3	X	X	8
(Manitoba) John Epping	0	0	2	0	0	0	X	X	2

Sheet D	1	2	3	4	5	6	7	8	Final
(Manitoba) Matt Dunstone 🔨	0	0	2	0	0	1	0	0	3
(Switzerland) Yannick Schwaller	1	1	0	1	1	0	0	1	5

==== Semifinals ====
Saturday, October 17, 7:30 pm

Sheet C	1	2	3	4	5	6	7	8	Final
(Alberta) Brad Jacobs 🔨	0	0	3	0	1	0	1	0	5
(Switzerland) Yannick Schwaller	1	1	0	1	0	1	0	2	6

Sheet D	1	2	3	4	5	6	7	8	Final
(Norway) Magnus Ramsfjell 🔨	0	1	0	2	0	0	2	2	7
(Switzerland) Marco Hösli	1	0	1	0	1	1	0	0	4

==== Final ====
Sunday, October 18, 4:00 pm

Sheet B	1	2	3	4	5	6	7	8	Final
(Switzerland) Yannick Schwaller	1	0	4	0	2	0	X	X	7
(Norway) Magnus Ramsfjell 🔨	0	0	0	1	0	2	X	X	3

== Women ==
=== Teams ===
The teams are listed as follows:

Skip	Third	Second	Lead	Alternate	Locale
Madeleine Dupont	Mathilde Halse	Katrine Schmidt	Denise Dupont		Hvidovre, Denmark
Kerri Einarson	Shannon Birchard	Karlee Burgess	Jocelyn Peterman		Gimli, Manitoba
Satsuki Fujisawa	Yako Matsuzawa	Yumi Suzuki	Yurika Yoshida		Kitami, Japan
Kim Min-ji (Fourth)	Gim Eun-ji (Skip)	Kim Su-ji	Seol Ye-eun	Seol Ye-ji	Uijeongbu, South Korea
Anna Hasselborg	Sara McManus	Agnes Knochenhauer	Sofia Scharback		Sundbyberg, Sweden
Rachel Homan	Tracy Fleury	Emma Miskew	Sarah Wilkes	Rachelle Brown	Ottawa, Ontario
Kim Kyeong-ae (Note: Kim Kyeong-ae skipped Team Kang as Kang Bo-bae was training with the mixed doubles national team. Kim Min-seo moved from alternate to third.)	Kim Min-seo	Shim Yu-jeong	Kim Ji-soo		Jeonbuk, South Korea
Kayla MacMillan (Fourth)	Val Sweeting (Skip) (Note: Val Sweeting skipped Team MacMillan.)	Lindsay Dubue	Lauren Lenentine		Victoria, British Columbia
Yuina Miura	Kohane Tsuruga	Rin Suzuki	Aone Nakamura		Sapporo, Japan
Miku Nihira	Momoha Tabata	Sae Yamamoto	Mikoto Nakajima		Sapporo, Japan
Alina Pätz	Selina Witschonke	Stefanie Berset	Renée Frigo		Geneva, Switzerland
Taylor Reese-Hansen	Megan McGillivray	Kim Bonneau	Julianna Mackenzie		Victoria, British Columbia
Xenia Schwaller	Selina Gafner	Fabienne Rieder	Selina Rychiger		Zurich, Switzerland
Miyu Ueno	Asuka Kanai	Yui Ozeki	Yui Ueno		Karuizawa, Japan
Isabella Wranå	Almida de Val	Moa Dryburgh	Maria Larsson		Sundbyberg, Sweden
Giulia Zardini Lacedelli	Elena Mathis	Marta Lo Deserto	Rachele Scalesse		Cortina d'Ampezzo, Italy

=== Round robin standings ===
Final Round Robin Standings

Key
Teams to Playoffs
Teams to Tiebreakers

Pool A	W	SOW	SOL	L	PF	PA	Pts	LSD
(Sweden) Isabella Wranå	3	0	0	1	26	22	9	85.7
(Japan) Yuina Miura	2	0	0	2	21	20	6	196.4
(Ontario) Rachel Homan	0	1	1	2	22	27	3	124.3
(Japan) Miku Nihira	0	0	1	3	18	30	1	80.8

Pool B	W	SOW	SOL	L	PF	PA	Pts	LSD
(Sweden) Anna Hasselborg	2	1	0	1	26	23	8	103.2
(Italy) Giulia Zardini Lacedelli	2	0	0	2	25	23	6	32.3
(Japan) Satsuki Fujisawa	1	0	0	3	21	34	3	58.6
(Denmark) Madeleine Dupont	1	0	0	3	26	31	3	119.2

Pool C	W	SOW	SOL	L	PF	PA	Pts	LSD
(Switzerland) Xenia Schwaller	3	0	0	1	25	20	9	21.2
(South Korea) Team Kang	2	1	0	1	26	22	8	46.5
(Switzerland) Alina Pätz	2	0	0	2	22	19	6	58.2
(British Columbia) Taylor Reese-Hansen	1	0	2	1	26	25	5	11.7

Pool D	W	SOW	SOL	L	PF	PA	Pts	LSD
(Manitoba) Kerri Einarson	3	0	0	1	24	20	9	49.0
(South Korea) Gim Eun-ji	3	0	0	1	24	18	9	84.6
(Japan) Miyu Ueno	2	0	0	2	23	21	6	31.1
(British Columbia) Team MacMillan	1	1	0	2	21	21	5	114.5

=== Round robin results ===
All draw times are listed in Pacific Time (UTC−08:00).

==== Draw 1 ====
Tuesday, October 13, 8:30 am

Sheet A	1	2	3	4	5	6	7	8	Final
(Sweden) Anna Hasselborg 🔨	1	0	3	1	0	1	1	X	7
(Italy) Giulia Zardini Lacedelli	0	1	0	0	2	0	0	X	3

Sheet B	1	2	3	4	5	6	7	8	Final
(Japan) Satsuki Fujisawa	0	1	0	4	0	0	2	1	8
(Denmark) Madeleine Dupont 🔨	2	0	1	0	1	1	0	0	5

==== Draw 2 ====
Tuesday, October 13, 12:00 pm

Sheet A	1	2	3	4	5	6	7	8	Final
(Switzerland) Alina Pätz	0	2	0	0	2	0	0	X	4
(British Columbia) Taylor Reese-Hansen 🔨	2	0	0	3	0	2	1	X	8

Sheet B	1	2	3	4	5	6	7	8	Final
(Manitoba) Kerri Einarson 🔨	0	1	1	0	2	3	0	X	7
(Japan) Miku Nihira	0	0	0	2	0	0	1	X	3

==== Draw 3 ====
Tuesday, October 13, 3:30 pm

Sheet A	1	2	3	4	5	6	7	8	Final
(Switzerland) Xenia Schwaller 🔨	0	0	1	0	0	1	1	0	3
(South Korea) Team Kang	0	1	0	0	1	0	0	3	5

Sheet D	1	2	3	4	5	6	7	8	Final
(South Korea) Gim Eun-ji 🔨	2	0	1	0	2	0	0	X	5
(Japan) Yuina Miura	0	0	0	1	0	2	0	X	3

==== Draw 4 ====
Tuesday, October 13, 7:00 pm

Sheet A	1	2	3	4	5	6	7	8	Final
(Sweden) Isabella Wranå	0	0	1	0	0	0	X	X	1
(Japan) Miyu Ueno 🔨	0	1	0	1	2	2	X	X	6

Sheet B	1	2	3	4	5	6	7	8	9	Final
(Ontario) Rachel Homan	0	1	0	1	0	2	0	1	0	5
(British Columbia) Team MacMillan 🔨	3	0	1	0	1	0	0	0	1	6

==== Draw 5 ====
Wednesday, October 14, 8:30 am

Sheet C	1	2	3	4	5	6	7	8	Final
(Japan) Satsuki Fujisawa 🔨	1	0	0	3	0	1	0	X	5
(South Korea) Team Kang	0	3	3	0	2	0	3	X	11

Sheet D	1	2	3	4	5	6	7	8	Final
(Switzerland) Xenia Schwaller 🔨	0	2	1	0	2	0	5	X	10
(Denmark) Madeleine Dupont	1	0	0	4	0	2	0	X	7

==== Draw 6 ====
Wednesday, October 14, 12:00 pm

Sheet B	1	2	3	4	5	6	7	8	Final
(Switzerland) Alina Pätz 🔨	1	0	2	0	3	0	2	X	8
(Italy) Giulia Zardini Lacedelli	0	1	0	1	0	1	0	X	3

Sheet C	1	2	3	4	5	6	7	8	Final
(Manitoba) Kerri Einarson	1	0	1	0	2	0	0	X	4
(Japan) Miyu Ueno 🔨	0	2	0	3	0	3	1	X	9

==== Draw 8 ====
Wednesday, October 14, 7:00 pm

Sheet A	1	2	3	4	5	6	7	8	Final
(South Korea) Gim Eun-ji 🔨	3	0	0	0	2	0	0	1	6
(British Columbia) Team MacMillan	0	1	1	1	0	1	0	0	4

Sheet B	1	2	3	4	5	6	7	8	9	Final
(Sweden) Anna Hasselborg	0	1	0	1	0	1	2	1	1	7
(British Columbia) Taylor Reese-Hansen 🔨	1	0	4	0	1	0	0	0	0	6

Sheet C	1	2	3	4	5	6	7	8	Final
(Sweden) Isabella Wranå 🔨	2	0	1	2	1	0	3	X	9
(Japan) Yuina Miura	0	2	0	0	0	3	0	X	5

Sheet D	1	2	3	4	5	6	7	8	9	Final
(Ontario) Rachel Homan	1	1	0	1	0	0	4	0	1	8
(Japan) Miku Nihira 🔨	0	0	1	0	2	1	0	3	0	7

==== Draw 10 ====
Thursday, October 15, 11:30 am

Sheet A	1	2	3	4	5	6	7	8	Final
(Sweden) Isabella Wranå 🔨	2	0	2	0	0	2	0	2	8
(Japan) Miku Nihira	0	1	0	2	1	0	1	0	5

Sheet D	1	2	3	4	5	6	7	8	Final
(South Korea) Gim Eun-ji	1	0	2	0	3	0	3	X	9
(Japan) Miyu Ueno 🔨	0	1	0	1	0	1	0	X	3

==== Draw 11 ====
Thursday, October 15, 3:00 pm

Sheet A	1	2	3	4	5	6	7	8	Final
(Ontario) Rachel Homan 🔨	1	0	1	0	0	1	0	0	3
(Japan) Yuina Miura	0	2	0	1	1	0	1	1	6

Sheet C	1	2	3	4	5	6	7	8	Final
(Switzerland) Xenia Schwaller 🔨	1	0	2	1	0	0	2	X	6
(Switzerland) Alina Pätz	0	1	0	0	1	1	0	X	3

Sheet D	1	2	3	4	5	6	7	8	Final
(Sweden) Anna Hasselborg	0	2	0	2	0	2	0	2	8
(Japan) Satsuki Fujisawa 🔨	2	0	2	0	1	0	2	0	7

==== Draw 12 ====
Thursday, October 15, 7:00 pm

Sheet A	1	2	3	4	5	6	7	8	9	Final
(British Columbia) Taylor Reese-Hansen 🔨	3	0	1	0	2	0	1	0	0	7
(South Korea) Team Kang	0	3	0	1	0	1	0	2	1	8

Sheet B	1	2	3	4	5	6	7	8	Final
(Manitoba) Kerri Einarson 🔨	0	1	0	2	0	1	0	1	5
(British Columbia) Team MacMillan	0	0	1	0	2	0	1	0	4

Sheet D	1	2	3	4	5	6	7	8	Final
(Denmark) Madeleine Dupont 🔨	3	1	0	1	0	0	2	0	7
(Italy) Giulia Zardini Lacedelli	0	0	3	0	2	3	0	1	9

==== Draw 13 ====
Friday, October 16, 8:30 am

Sheet B	1	2	3	4	5	6	7	8	Final
(Switzerland) Alina Pätz 🔨	0	2	0	4	0	0	1	X	7
(South Korea) Team Kang	0	0	1	0	0	1	0	X	2

Sheet C	1	2	3	4	5	6	7	8	Final
(Japan) Miku Nihira	0	0	1	0	1	0	1	X	3
(Japan) Yuina Miura 🔨	1	1	0	3	0	2	0	X	7

==== Draw 14 ====
Friday, October 16, 12:00 pm

Sheet B	1	2	3	4	5	6	7	8	Final
(Japan) Satsuki Fujisawa	0	0	0	1	0	X	X	X	1
(Italy) Giulia Zardini Lacedelli 🔨	4	3	1	0	2	X	X	X	10

==== Draw 15 ====
Friday, October 16, 3:30 pm

Sheet A	1	2	3	4	5	6	7	8	Final
(British Columbia) Team MacMillan	0	2	0	2	0	2	0	1	7
(Japan) Miyu Ueno 🔨	1	0	2	0	1	0	1	0	5

Sheet B	1	2	3	4	5	6	7	8	Final
(Ontario) Rachel Homan	0	2	0	1	0	3	0	0	6
(Sweden) Isabella Wranå 🔨	2	0	1	0	2	0	1	2	8

Sheet C	1	2	3	4	5	6	7	8	Final
(Manitoba) Kerri Einarson 🔨	1	1	0	1	0	0	4	1	8
(South Korea) Gim Eun-ji	0	0	1	0	2	1	0	0	4

==== Draw 16 ====
Friday, October 16, 7:00 pm

Sheet A	1	2	3	4	5	6	7	8	Final
(Sweden) Anna Hasselborg 🔨	1	0	0	1	1	0	1	X	4
(Denmark) Madeleine Dupont	0	2	3	0	0	2	0	X	7

Sheet D	1	2	3	4	5	6	7	8	Final
(Switzerland) Xenia Schwaller	0	0	2	1	0	1	0	2	6
(British Columbia) Taylor Reese-Hansen 🔨	1	0	0	0	3	0	1	0	5

=== Tiebreakers ===
Saturday, October 17, 8:00 am

Sheet A	1	2	3	4	5	6	7	8	Final
(Italy) Giulia Zardini Lacedelli 🔨	1	0	1	0	1	0	1	0	4
(Switzerland) Alina Pätz	0	2	0	1	0	1	0	1	5

Sheet D	1	2	3	4	5	6	7	8	Final
(Japan) Miyu Ueno	0	0	3	1	0	3	0	2	9
(Japan) Yuina Miura 🔨	2	2	0	0	1	0	2	0	7

=== Playoffs ===
Quarterfinals
1	(Switzerland) Xenia Schwaller	8
8	(Switzerland) Alina Pätz	5
4	(Sweden) Isabella Wranå	4
5	(South Korea) Team Kang	5
2	(Manitoba) Kerri Einarson	6
7	(Japan) Miyu Ueno	5
3	(South Korea) Gim Eun-ji	7
6	(Sweden) Anna Hasselborg	6

Semifinals
1	(Switzerland) Xenia Schwaller	6
5	(South Korea) Team Kang	7
2	(Manitoba) Kerri Einarson	8
3	(South Korea) Gim Eun-ji	4

Final
5	(South Korea) Team Kang	3
2	(Manitoba) Kerri Einarson	6

==== Quarterfinals ====
Saturday, October 17, 12:00 pm

Sheet A	1	2	3	4	5	6	7	8	Final
(Sweden) Isabella Wranå 🔨	0	1	0	0	0	2	1	0	4
(South Korea) Team Kang	1	0	1	1	0	0	0	2	5

Sheet B	1	2	3	4	5	6	7	8	Final
(Manitoba) Kerri Einarson 🔨	0	0	2	0	1	0	0	3	6
(Japan) Miyu Ueno	0	1	0	2	0	1	1	0	5

Sheet C	1	2	3	4	5	6	7	8	Final
(Switzerland) Xenia Schwaller 🔨	0	4	0	1	1	0	0	2	8
(Switzerland) Alina Pätz	0	0	1	0	0	2	2	0	5

Sheet D	1	2	3	4	5	6	7	8	Final
(South Korea) Gim Eun-ji 🔨	1	2	0	2	0	2	0	0	7
(Sweden) Anna Hasselborg	0	0	1	0	2	0	2	1	6

==== Semifinals ====
Saturday, October 17, 7:30 pm

Sheet A	1	2	3	4	5	6	7	8	Final
(Manitoba) Kerri Einarson	0	2	0	2	1	1	2	X	8
(South Korea) Gim Eun-ji 🔨	2	0	2	0	0	0	0	X	4

Sheet B	1	2	3	4	5	6	7	8	9	Final
(Switzerland) Xenia Schwaller 🔨	0	1	0	1	0	1	1	2	0	6
(South Korea) Team Kang	1	0	2	0	3	0	0	0	1	7

==== Final ====
Sunday, October 18, 12:00 pm

Sheet B	1	2	3	4	5	6	7	8	Final
(South Korea) Team Kang	0	0	2	0	1	0	0	X	3
(Manitoba) Kerri Einarson 🔨	1	1	0	2	0	2	0	X	6
