= Shorty Jenkins =

Clarence W. "Shorty" Jenkins (1935 – 11 April 2013) was a famous ice technician in the sport of curling. He was known for his "trademark" pink cowboy hat, pink leather jacket and pink cowboy boots.

Born in Hanna, Alberta and raised in an orphanage in Victoria, British Columbia, Jenkins served in the Royal Canadian Air Force from the age of 17. He would be posted in Germany and in Canada to do various military jobs. He eventually left the military to work with Sunoco. That wouldn't last, and Jenkins convinced the curling club in Trenton, Ontario to take him on as ice maker. He wanted to be an ice maker after noting how terrible the ice was at the 1974 provincial championships he was competing in.

One trend Shorty started in curling was that of timing rocks. He used his idea to judge how good the ice was. Jenkins claimed he was the only person who could "choose and match rocks for major championships". He refused to do the ice of a tournament without choosing the rocks for it. Jenkins kept video tapes of the tournaments he had done to see what the television announcers were saying about his ice.

In the late 1990s Jenkins starred in his own commercial for the Tim Hortons donut chain, celebrating "true Tim Hortons stories".

Presently, the Shorty Jenkins Classic curling bonspiel is held in his name. It occurs annually in Cornwall, Ontario in the month of September.

Jenkins died on April 11, 2013, at the age of 77, following a lengthy illness.

== Sources ==
- Who is Shorty Jenkins?
- Curlers, fans, icemakers mourn the passing of Shorty Jenkins
