= David Mathers (curler) =

Canadian curler

- Curler
- Born: May 12, 1991 (age 35); Ottawa, Ontario, Canada

Team
- Curling club: Penetanguishene CC, Penetanguishene, ON & Ottawa CC, Ottawa, ON
- Skip: Scott Howard
- Third: David Mathers
- Second: Pat Janssen
- Lead: Scott Chadwick
- Mixed doubles partner: Lynn Kreviazuk

Curling career
- Member Association: Ontario (2006-2015; 2016-present); Prince Edward Island (2015-2016)
- Brier: 6 (2015, 2016, 2017, 2021, 2022, 2024)
- Top CTRS ranking: 5th (2011–12)
- Grand Slam victories: 1 (2012 Players')
Medal record
Curling
Representing Ontario
Canadian Mixed Doubles Trials
Bronze medal – third place	2015 Ottawa

David Seth "Splash" Mathers (/ˈmeɪðərz/ MAY-dhərz); born May 12, 1991) is a Canadian curler from Ottawa, Ontario, Canada. He currently plays third on Team Scott Howard.

Born in Ottawa, Mathers grew up in the Waterloo Region.

== Curling career ==
=== Junior's ===
As a student at Kitchener-Waterloo Collegiate and Vocational School, Mathers won the 2007 Ontario Schoolboy Championship, playing second for Andrew Flemming. The following year, he won a Bantam championship playing second for Mike Flemming. Mathers would then move back to Ottawa to attend Algonquin College.

As a junior curler, Mathers played second for the Mathew Camm rink at the 2011 Canadian Junior Curling Championships, representing Ontario. The team lost to Saskatchewan's Braeden Moskowy in the final. That season, they also played in the 2010 Canada Cup of Curling (going 0–5) and the 2011 Players' Championship, Mathers' first Grand Slam event, where they won just one game.

=== Men's ===
Following his junior career, Mathers was picked up to play lead for the John Epping rink. This team would find immediate success on the World Curling Tour, winning the 2011 AMJ Campbell Shorty Jenkins Classic which was their first event of the season. The team played in the Grand Slams that season, losing in the final of the 2011 World Cup of Curling, failing to qualify at the 2011 BDO Canadian Open and winning the 2012 Players' Championship. Despite their success, the team failed to qualify for the provincial championship that season.

The next season, the team began the season by winning two straight WCT events (the 2012 AMJ Campbell Shorty Jenkins Classic and the 2012 Point Optical Curling Classic). The team entered all four Slams that season, failing to qualify for the playoffs in three of the four events. Their best result was the quarter-finals at the 2013 Players' Championship. The team also played at the 2012 Canada Cup of Curling, winning just three games. The team did make it to the provincial championships that season. At the 2013 provincial championship, they lost in the semi-final.

Their relative success over the previous two seasons gave the Epping rink a direct berth to the 2013 Canadian Olympic Curling Trials, just edging out the defending Brier champion Brad Jacobs rink on the CRTS ranking. However, the rink won just one game at the Trials, finishing last. The team did not win any WCT events in the 2013-14 curling season. The team played in two Slams, failing to qualify at the 2013 Masters of Curling and losing in the quarter-finals of the 2013 Canadian Open of Curling. The team played at the 2014 provincial championship, but failed to make the playoffs. At the end of the season, the Epping rink dissolved and Mathers joined the Mark Kean team, playing second.

Mathers finally won a provincial championship with Kean in 2015. The team would beat Epping in the final of the 2015 Ontario Tankard. They would represent Ontario at the 2015 Tim Hortons Brier, finishing with a 5–6 record.

Mathers moved to Charlottetown, Prince Edward Island for one season, playing for the Adam Casey rink. The team won the 2016 PEI Tankard, and represented Prince Edward Island at the 2016 Tim Hortons Brier, finishing with a 2–9 record. Mathers then moved to Ottawa, joining Team Glenn Howard. The team won the 2017 Ontario Tankard, and represented Ontario at the 2017 Tim Hortons Brier, finishing with a 4–7 record.

== Personal life ==
Mathers currently works as a national branch manager for Canada Brokerlink in Ottawa. He is married to fellow curler Lynn Kreviazuk, and coached her rink, Team Jacqueline Harrison at the 2021 Canadian Olympic Curling Trials. Mathers focus is the Canadian Curling Club program for the company insuring curling clubs across Canada. When in P.E.I. Mathers worked for Fox Meadows Golf Club for the 10 months he was there, living in Charlottetown, Prince Edward Island.
