= Jo-Ann Rizzo =

Canadian curler (born 1963)

- Curler
- Born: Jo-Ann Vaters; June 1, 1963 (age 63); Zweibrücken, West Germany

Team
- Curling club: Brantford G&CC, Brantford, ON
- Skip: Danielle Inglis
- Third: Jo-Ann Rizzo
- Second: Geri-Lynn Ramsay
- Lead: Joanne Tarvit

Curling career
- Member Association: Ontario (1988–2020; 2024–present); Northwest Territories (2020–2024)
- Hearts: 5 (2020, 2021, 2022, 2023, 2024)
- World Senior Curling Championship: 1 (2024)
- Top CTRS ranking: 3rd (2011–12)
- Grand Slam victories: 1 (2012 Autumn Gold)
Medal record
Women's curling
Representing Canada
World Senior Curling Championships
Gold medal – first place	2024 Östersund
Representing Ontario
Canadian Olympic Curling Trials
Silver medal – second place	2013 Winnipeg

Jo-Ann Rizzo (born June 1, 1963 in Zweibrücken, West Germany) is a Canadian curler from Brantford, Ontario. She currently plays third on Team Danielle Inglis.

== Career ==
Rizzo grew up in Germany, where her father was stationed in the military. She began curling at the age of 12, thanks to her mother's involvement in the sport. She moved to Canada at age 16. She attended the University of Western Ontario where she won two Ontario University Athletics championships.

As of 2013, Rizzo has played in 13 Ontario Scotties Tournament of Hearts. She is also a former provincial mixed champion. She played third for her husband Nick Rizzo at the 2003 Canadian Mixed Curling Championship, where they finished in 4th place.

Rizzo qualified for the 2005 Canadian Olympic Curling Trials, where she and her rink of Cheryl McPherson, Kimberly Tuck and Sara Gatchell finished in 9th with a 2-7 record.

Rizzo is a former skip, but she joined up with Middaugh in 2010. With Middaugh, the team won the 2012 Curlers Corner Autumn Gold Curling Classic and finished second at the 2013 Canadian Olympic Curling Trials. The Middaugh rink dissolved in 2018.

Rizzo won provincial senior curling championships in 2016 and 2017, finishing fourth at the 2016 Canadian Senior Curling Championships and second at the 2017 Canadian Senior Curling Championships. Rizzo also coached the US team at the 2017 World Senior Curling Championships.

Rizzo joined the Yellowknife, Northwest Territories-based Kerry Galusha rink for the 2019–20 season, first at second, but later throwing fourth stones. They had some success on the tour, having a quarterfinal finish at the 2019 AMJ Campbell Shorty Jenkins Classic and reaching the semifinals of the Stu Sells Toronto Tankard. The team won the 2020 Northwest Territories Scotties Tournament of Hearts in January 2020, qualifying Rizzo for her first Canadian women's championship appearance. At the 2020 Scotties Tournament of Hearts, they finished 2–5, not enough to advance to the championship pool. The following season, Team Galusha again won the 2021 Northwest Territories Scotties Tournament of Hearts. At the 2021 Scotties Tournament of Hearts, the team finished the round robin with a 4–4 record, just missing the championship pool.

Team Galusha had a great start to the 2021–22 season, beginning with the Stu Sells Oakville Tankard where they lost in the final to Team Hollie Duncan. The following week, they won the KW Fall Classic after defeating the Duncan rink in the championship game. Due to the COVID-19 pandemic in Canada, the qualification process for the 2021 Canadian Olympic Curling Trials had to be modified to qualify enough teams for the championship. In these modifications, Curling Canada created the 2021 Canadian Curling Pre-Trials Direct-Entry Event, an event where eight teams would compete to try to earn one of two spots into the 2021 Canadian Olympic Curling Pre-Trials. Team Galusha qualified for the Pre-Trials Direct-Entry Event as the fourth seed. The team qualified for the playoffs by going 3–0 in the A Event and then defeated Team Robyn Silvernagle (skipped by Jessie Hunkin) 10–8 to earn the first spot in the Pre-Trials. The next month, the team competed in the Pre-Trials where they finished with a 1–5 record, only beating Team Penny Barker. The 2022 Northwest Territories Scotties Tournament of Hearts was cancelled due to the pandemic and Team Galusha were selected to represent the Territories at the national women's championship. At the 2022 Scotties Tournament of Hearts, the team finished the round robin with a 5–3 record, qualifying them for a tiebreaker against Manitoba's Mackenzie Zacharias. Team Galusha won the tiebreaker 8–6, earning themselves a spot in the playoffs and becoming the first team solely representing the Northwest Territories to qualify for the playoffs in Scotties history. They then lost in the first game of the playoff round to New Brunswick's Andrea Crawford and were eliminated from contention.

To begin the 2022–23 season, Team Galusha reached the quarterfinals of the 2022 Saville Shoot-Out where they lost to Casey Scheidegger. They then played in the 2022 PointsBet Invitational where they again lost to the Scheidegger rink in the opening round. The team continued to have success on tour in October, reaching the semifinals of the 2022 Tour Challenge Tier 2 Slam and the quarterfinals of the North Grenville Women's Fall Curling Classic. In the new year, they again went undefeated to win the 2023 Northwest Territories Scotties Tournament of Hearts, defeating Reese Wainman 8–1 in the final. Representing the Territories at the 2023 Scotties Tournament of Hearts, Team Galusha started the event with a 3–1 record before losing their next three games. They won their final game against the Yukon to finish fourth in their pool with a 4–4 record, missing the playoffs. Also during the 2022–23 season, Rizzo skipped Ontario to a fourth-place finish at the 2022 Canadian Senior Curling Championships. After a 7–3 round robin record, she lost both the semifinal and the bronze medal game.

The Galusha rink did not have as much success on tour the following season, only reaching the playoffs in two of their first six events. This included a semifinal finish at the Alberta Tour Kick-off and a quarterfinal appearance at the 2023 KW Fall Classic. In December, the team went undefeated at the Stu Sells Brantford Nissan Classic until the final where they lost to Courtney Auld. After winning the 2024 Northwest Territories Scotties Tournament of Hearts, the team announced the 2024 Scotties Tournament of Hearts would be their last event together as they would disband at the end of the season. At the Hearts, the team finished fifth in their pool with a 3–5 record. This included defeating Manitoba's Jennifer Jones in their final round robin game and having the largest comeback in Scotties history, overcoming a seven-point deficit after three ends to defeat Ontario's Danielle Inglis 10–9.

Rizzo won a third provincial senior championship in 2024 with teammates Janet Murphy, Lori Eddy and Mary Chilvers. The quartet would go on to lose in the finals of the 2024 Canadian Senior Curling Championships after not recording a loss at any other point in the tournament. Rizzo however would still find herself selected to attend the 2024 World Senior Curling Championships as an alternate where she would get to claim a gold medal.

== Personal life ==
Jo-Ann and Nick have three children. She was inducted into the Brantford and Area Sports Hall of Recognition in 2018. Her uncle is well known icemaker Shorty Jenkins.
