= Chad Allen (curler) =

Canadian curler from Brantford, Ontario

- Curler

Team
- Curling club: Tillsonburg & District CC, Tillsomburg, ON

Curling career
- Member Association: Ontario
- Top CTRS ranking: 22nd (2013–14)

Chad Allen (born c. 1974) is a Canadian curler from Brantford, Ontario.

== Career ==
In 2002 Allen won the Boston Cash Spiel, and in 2003 the Nissan Classic in Brantford. His team was a finalist at the 2011 AMJ Campbell Shorty Jenkins Classic.

In 2002, Allen won the Ontario Tim Hortons Colts Championship.

Allen has played skip for most of his career, although he was the third for Jason Young in 2008-09 (and at the 2010 provincial championship) and for Nick Rizzo in the 2010–11 season.
