= Brad Jacobs =

Canadian curler (born 1985)

Bradley Jacobs
- Curler
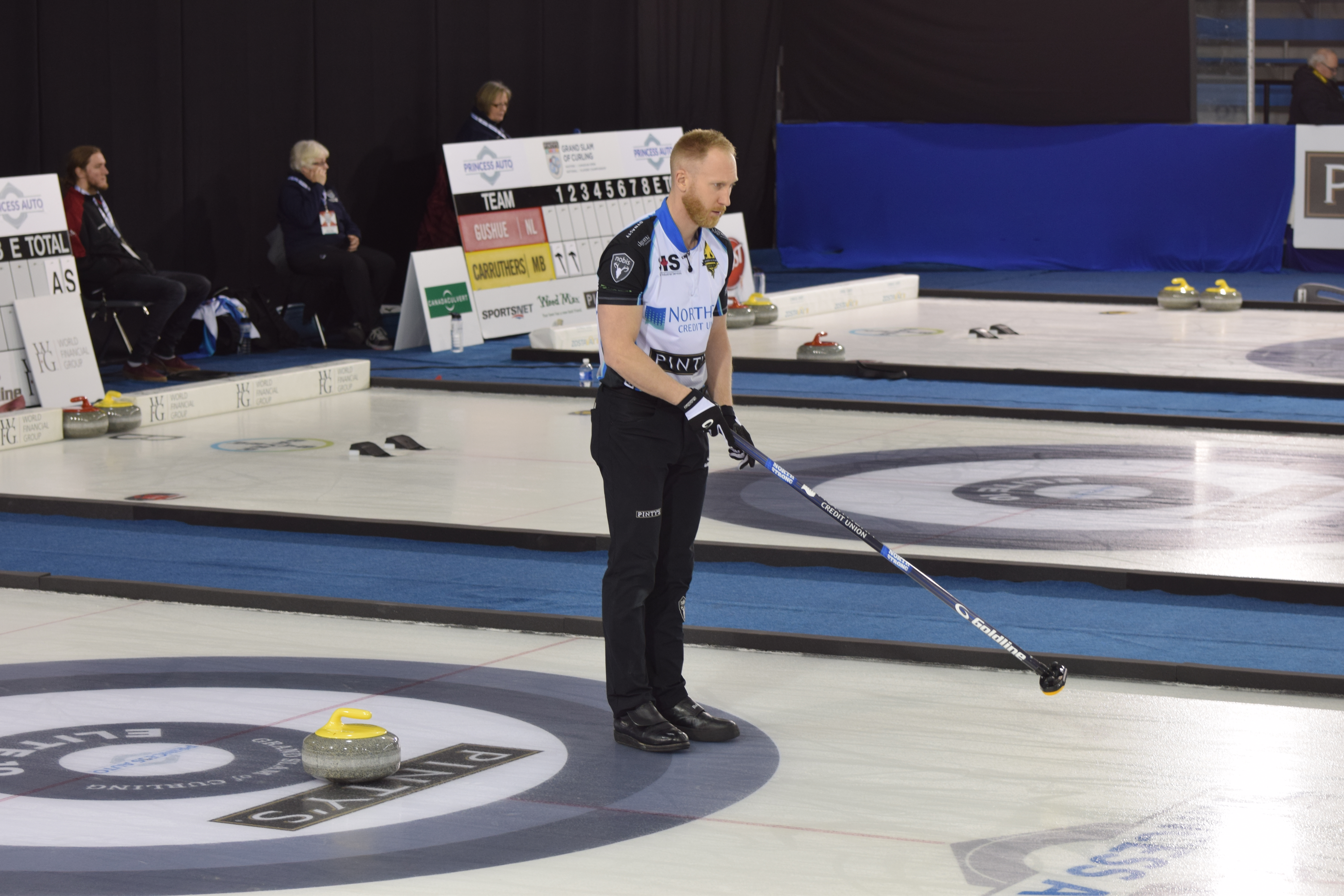
- Jacobs at the March 2018 Elite 10
- Born: Bradley Robert Jacobs; June 11, 1985 (age 41); Sault Ste. Marie, Ontario, Canada

Team
- Curling club: Community First CC, Sault Ste. Marie, ON
- Skip: Brad Jacobs
- Third: Marc Kennedy
- Second: Brett Gallant
- Lead: Ben Hebert
- Alternate: Tyler Tardi

Curling career
- Member Association: Northern Ontario (1995–2022); Manitoba (2023–2024); Alberta (2024–present)
- Brier: 17 (2007, 2008, 2010, 2011, 2012, 2013, 2015, 2016, 2017, 2018, 2019, 2020, 2021, 2022, 2024, 2025, 2026)
- World Championship: 2 (2013, 2025)
- Pan Continental Championship: 1 (2025)
- Olympic: 2 (2014, 2026)
- Top CTRS ranking: 1st (2013–14, 2019–20, 2024–25, 2025–26)
- Grand Slam victories: 8 (2015 Players', 2016 National, 2017 Champions Cup, 2018 Tour Challenge, 2019 Tour Challenge, 2019 National, 2020 Canadian Open, 2026 National)
Medal record
Men's curling
Representing Canada
Olympic Games
Gold medal – first place	2014 Sochi
Gold medal – first place	2026 Milano Cortina
World Championships
Silver medal – second place	2013 Victoria
Bronze medal – third place	2025 Moose Jaw
Pan Continental Championships
Gold medal – first place	2025 Virginia
The Brier
Bronze medal – third place	2026 St. John's
Representing Northern Ontario
Canadian Olympic Curling Trials
Gold medal – first place	2013 Winnipeg
Silver medal – second place	2021 Saskatoon
The Brier
Gold medal – first place	2013 Edmonton
Silver medal – second place	2015 Calgary
Bronze medal – third place	2010 Halifax
Bronze medal – third place	2016 Ottawa
Bronze medal – third place	2019 Brandon
Representing Alberta
Canadian Olympic Curling Trials
Gold medal – first place	2025 Halifax
The Brier
Gold medal – first place	2025 Kelowna

Bradley Robert Jacobs (born June 11, 1985) is a Canadian curler from Sault Ste. Marie, Ontario. He currently skips his own team out of Calgary, Alberta. He is a 2-time Olympic champion skip, having led Canada to gold medals at the 2014 Winter Olympics and the 2026 Winter Olympics. Jacobs is also the 2013 Tim Hortons Brier and the 2025 Montana's Brier championship skip and the 2013 World Championship runner-up. He is a 12-time Northern Ontario provincial champion, and one-time provincial junior champion.

Jacobs and his 2014 Olympic gold medallist team were well known for their physical fitness. They have been described as "fitness freaks" and were in 2014 "embracing curling's athletic evolution as much or more than any other team", helping to start the movement of more curling athletes embracing fitness and spending equal time "on the curling ice and at the gym".

== Career ==
=== Junior career ===
Bradley Jacobs began curling at age ten with a coach named Tom Coulterman in 1995. Coulterman saw potential in him and formed a team, with Jacobs playing third for Ryan Harnden, and being joined by Matt Premo and Scott Seabrook. As Jacobs entered high school, he entered competitive curling and took it seriously. He played second for Harnden in tournaments age 16 and under and played second for E. J. Harnden on the highschool team. In the fall, they formed a team together with E.J. as skip, Ryan as second, and Jacobs throwing lead stones. They came third in the tournament. By autumn 2001, they added Caleb Flaxey at third. They were starting to feel comfortable enough as a team that they entered the Regal Capital Curling Classic men's bonspiel at their home club. The bonspiel included most of the best teams from the region, including one skipped by Al Harnden and featuring Eric Harnden. 1998 men's Olympic curling champion Patrick Hurlimann also was in the bonspiel. In the first draw, they were matched against Hurlimann. They won the game 5-3. "Once we got the lead, they were kind of shocked," Flaxey told the Sault Star. Hurlimann was sure that "they will have a bright future".

He had a successful junior career, winning the Northern Ontario Junior Men's Championship in 2005 with teammates Brady Barnett, Scott Seabrook and Steve Molodowich. This gave his team a berth at the 2005 Canadian Junior Curling Championships, representing the region. At the Canadian Juniors, he led the team to an 8–4 record, good enough for fourth place, but out of the playoffs.

=== Men's career ===
==== 2008–2022: Northern Ontario ====
Jacobs first started in his men's career playing for his uncle, Al Harnden, with Jacobs throwing last rocks on the team. The team finished 5–6 at the 2007 Tim Hortons Brier. Jacobs participated in the 2008 Tim Hortons Brier as an alternate for another uncle, Eric Harnden. In 2008, Jacobs formed his own team with his cousins (Eric's sons) E. J. Harnden and Ryan Harnden as well as Caleb Flaxey. The team won the Northern Ontario provincial title in 2010, qualifying for the 2010 Tim Hortons Brier where they made the playoffs, the first team from Northern Ontario to do that since the 1993 Labatt Brier. Jacobs' team represented Northern Ontario again at the 2011 Tim Hortons Brier, where they finished with a 7–4 record, out of the playoffs. The following season, during the semifinal of The Dominion 2012 Northern Ontario Men's Curling Championship, Jacobs and team scored a rare eight-ender, in the sixth end to win the game 14–3. The team would go on to win the Northern Ontario championship and go to the Brier again in 2012, where they finished 5–6. The following year at the 2013 Tim Hortons Brier, they became the first team from Northern Ontario to win the Brier since 1985. The win gave them the right to represent Canada at the 2013 Ford World Men's Curling Championship. At the Worlds, Jacobs skipped the Canadian team to a silver medal, losing to Sweden's Niklas Edin in the final. Jacobs got another chance to represent Canada the next year, going undefeated and winning the 2013 Canadian Olympic Curling Trials to represent Canada at the 2014 Winter Olympics. There, Team Jacobs won their first international championship, defeating Great Britain's David Murdoch 9–3 in the final. Jacobs curled 95% in the gold medal game.

Following their Olympic success, the Jacobs rink once again made it to the Brier in 2015. After posting a 10-1 round robin record in first place, they won the 1 vs. 2 game, sending them to the final against the defending Brier champions, Team Canada (skipped by Pat Simmons), which they lost. Later in the season the Jacobs rink won their first career Grand Slam event, the 2015 Players' Championship. At the 2016 Tim Hortons Brier, the Jacobs rink once again tore through the round robin, going undefeated to finish in first place. However, they ran into trouble in the playoffs, losing to Newfoundland and Labrador in the 1 vs. 2 game and to Alberta in the semifinals. They did rebound in the bronze medal game, defeating Manitoba to finish third overall.

The 2016-17 season would be the best to date for the Jacobs rink on the World Curling Tour, winning two slams, the 2016 Boost National and the 2017 Humpty's Champions Cup. At the 2017 Tim Hortons Brier, the team once again made the playoffs, after posting an 8-3 round robin record. However, they lost both of their playoff games, settling for fourth place. Jacobs played in the 2017 Canadian Olympic Curling Trials, attempting to head to the Olympics again, but his team finished with a 3-5 record and missed the playoffs. The team again represented Northern Ontario at the 2018 Tim Hortons Brier, making it to the playoffs with an 8-3 record, but lost to Alberta's Brendan Bottcher rink in the 3 vs. 4 game.

The next season, the Jacobs rink won the 2018 Tour Challenge Grand Slam event. A month later, the team won the 2018 Canada Cup, their first Canada Cup title, defeating Kevin Koe's rink in the final. The team had Marc Kennedy playing third, filling in for Ryan Fry, who was on sabbatical following unsportsmanlike behaviour and excessive drinking at the 2018 Red Deer Curling Classic. The team once again represented Northern Ontario at the 2019 Tim Hortons Brier, going 9-2 in the round robin and championship round combined. Jacobs lost the 1 vs. 2 game to Kevin Koe and the semifinal to Brendan Bottcher resulting in the bronze medal.

The following season, the team officially added Kennedy to the line-up at third, with Fry going to play with John Epping. In their first event, the 2019 AMJ Campbell Shorty Jenkins Classic, the team went undefeated until the final where they lost to former teammate Fry and Team Epping. Team Jacobs won three straight Grand Slam events, at the Tour Challenge, National and the Canadian Open. They won the 2020 Northern Ontario Men's Provincial Curling Championship for the sixth year in a row. At the 2020 Tim Hortons Brier, they battled through two tiebreakers before losing to Newfoundland and Labrador's Brad Gushue in the 3 vs. 4 game, all in the same day. It was the team's last event of the season as both the Players' Championship and the Champions Cup Grand Slam events were cancelled due to the COVID-19 pandemic.

Team Jacobs played in two tour events during the 2020–21 season, winning the Stu Sells Oakville Tankard and losing in the qualification game of the Ashley HomeStore Curling Classic. Due to the COVID-19 pandemic in Ontario, the 2021 provincial championship was cancelled. As the reigning provincial champions, Team Jacobs was chosen to represent Northern Ontario at the 2021 Tim Hortons Brier. At the Brier, Jacobs led his team to a 7–5 sixth place finish. They wrapped up the season by making it to the quarterfinals of the 2021 Champions Cup and the semifinals of the 2022 Players' Championship.

Team Jacobs began the 2021–22 curling season by winning the 2021 Oakville Labour Day Classic. The next month, they lost in the final of the 2021 Masters, but did not make the playoffs at the 2021 National. The team played in the 2021 Canadian Olympic Curling Trials, where Jacobs led the team to a 7–1 round robin record, tied for first. They then knocked off Kevin Koe in the semifinal before losing to Brad Gushue in the final. The team rolled through 2022 Northern Ontario Men's Provincial Curling Championship, losing just one game en route to the championship. The team was missing Kennedy who was playing as the alternate for Team Canada at the 2022 Olympics. He was replaced by Jordan Chandler. The team then represented Northern Ontario at the 2022 Tim Hortons Brier, where Jacobs led the rink to a 6–2 round robin record. This put them into the Championship round, where they were eliminated by Saskatchewan's Colton Flasch rink. The team then finished the season by making it to the quarterfinals of the 2022 Players' Championship and the semis of the 2022 Champions Cup. In March 2022, Jacobs announced he would be stepping back from competitive curling.

==== 2023–2024: Manitoba and Team Carruthers ====
Jacobs made his return in 2023, playing third for Reid Carruthers' rink in the Canadian Open as well as the remainder of the season's Slams. Starting in the 2023-24 curling season, Jacobs joined the former Reid Carruthers team full-time as their skip. The team won their first Manitoba Provincial Championship, where Jacobs represented Manitoba for the first time at the 2024 Montana's Brier, where they failed to reach the playoffs. After one season together, Jacobs announced he would be leaving the Carruthers team to skip a new team from Alberta with Marc Kennedy, Brett Gallant, and Ben Hebert.

==== 2024–present: Alberta and return to the Olympics ====
In their first season together, the newly formed Jacobs team enjoyed plenty of success, finishing second at the 2024 National and the 2025 Masters grand slam events. Like the previous season, the Jacobs team pre-qualified for the 2025 Brier based on their CTRS ranking, which meant they bypassed the provincial qualifiers. At the 2025 Montana's Brier, the Jacobs rink won the national championship, beating Matt Dunstone in the final and qualifying to represent Canada at the 2025 World Men's Curling Championship. At the 2025 Worlds, the Jacobs rink went 11–1 in round robin play, but lost to Scotland's Bruce Mouat in the semi-final. The team rebounded to win the bronze medal, beating China's Xu Xiaoming 11–2.

Team Jacobs started the 2025–26 curling season winning the 2025 Pan Continental Curling Championships, beating John Shuster of the United States 7–3 in the final. They also had a strong year on the grand slam tour, finishing as semifinalists at the 2025 Masters and 2025 GSOC Tahoe. Team Jacobs tried to return to the Olympics at the 2025 Canadian Olympic Curling Trials. There, they finished the round robin in first place with a 6–1 record, and then beat Dunstone in both games of their best-of-three final to represent Canada at the 2026 Winter Olympics.

== Personal life ==
Jacobs was born in Sault Ste. Marie, the son of Bob and Cynthia Jacobs (née Harnden). He holds a bachelor's degree in geography from Algoma University. He currently works as a senior marketing director for World Financial Group. He is married to Shawna Jacobs and has two children.

== Grand Slam record ==
Key
C	Champion
F	Lost in Final
SF	Lost in Semifinal
QF	Lost in Quarterfinals
R16	Lost in the round of 16
Q	Did not advance to playoffs
T2	Played in Tier 2 event
DNP	Did not participate in event
N/A	Not a Grand Slam event that season

Event	2009–10	2010–11	2011–12	2012–13	2013–14	2014–15	2015–16	2016–17	2017–18	2018–19	2019–20	2020–21	2021–22	2022–23	2023–24	2024–25	2025–26	2026–27
Invitational	N/A	N/A	N/A	N/A	N/A	N/A	QF	Q	SF	C	C	N/A	N/A	DNP	QF	QF	DNP	SF
Masters	DNP	Q	Q	QF	DNP	SF	QF	F	QF	Q	QF	N/A	F	DNP	QF	F	SF	Q
National	Q	DNP	DNP	QF	Q	F	QF	C	Q	QF	C	N/A	Q	DNP	Q	F	SF	style="background:#00ff00;"| C
Open	DNP	DNP	QF	F	DNP	QF	Q	SF	SF	QF	C	N/A	N/A	Q (Note: Jacobs spared for Jason Gunnlaugson on Team Reid Carruthers.)	Q	QF	QF	
Players'	DNP	Q	DNP	SF	F	C	F	QF	Q	QF	N/A	SF	QF	Q	Q	SF	Q	
Champions Cup	N/A	N/A	N/A	N/A	N/A	N/A	DNP	C	Q	QF	N/A	QF	SF	Q	N/A	N/A	N/A	N/A
Elite 10	N/A	N/A	N/A	N/A	N/A	SF	DNP	F	QF	SF	N/A	N/A	N/A	N/A	N/A	N/A	N/A	N/A

== Teams ==
Season	Skip	Third	Second	Lead
2001–02 (NOSSA)	E. J. Harnden	Caleb Flaxey	Ryan Harnden	Brad Jacobs
2002 (OWG)	Jamie Morphet	Ryan Harnden	Brad Jacobs	David Daoust
2002–03	Ryan Harnden	Brad Jacobs	Scott Seabrook	Dan Murray
2003–04	Matt Seabrook	Brad Jacobs	Brady Barnett	Scott Seabrook
2004–05	Brad Jacobs	Brady Barnett	Scott Seabrook	Steve Molodowich
2005–06	Brad Jacobs	Ryan Harnden	Scott Seabrook	Steve Molodowich
2006–07	Al Harnden	Brad Jacobs	Dusty Jakomait	Rob Thomas
2007–08	Al Harnden	Brad Jacobs	Dusty Jakomait	Rob Thomas
2008–09	Brad Jacobs	E. J. Harnden	Ryan Harnden	Caleb Flaxey
2009–10	Brad Jacobs	E. J. Harnden	Ryan Harnden	Caleb Flaxey
2010–11	Brad Jacobs	E. J. Harnden	Ryan Harnden	Scott Seabrook
2011–12	Brad Jacobs	E. J. Harnden	Ryan Harnden	Scott Seabrook
2012–13	Brad Jacobs	Ryan Fry	E. J. Harnden	Ryan Harnden
2013–14	Brad Jacobs	Ryan Fry	E. J. Harnden	Ryan Harnden
2014–15	Brad Jacobs	Ryan Fry	E. J. Harnden	Ryan Harnden
2015–16	Brad Jacobs	Ryan Fry	E. J. Harnden	Ryan Harnden
2016–17	Brad Jacobs	Ryan Fry	E. J. Harnden	Ryan Harnden
2017–18	Brad Jacobs	Ryan Fry	E. J. Harnden	Ryan Harnden
2018–19	Brad Jacobs	Ryan Fry	E. J. Harnden	Ryan Harnden
2019–20	Brad Jacobs	Marc Kennedy	E. J. Harnden	Ryan Harnden
2020–21	Brad Jacobs	Marc Kennedy	E. J. Harnden	Ryan Harnden
2021–22	Brad Jacobs	Marc Kennedy	E. J. Harnden	Ryan Harnden
2023 (playdowns)	Brad Jacobs	Jordan Chandler	Kyle Chandler	Jamie Broad
2023 (Slams)	Reid Carruthers	Brad Jacobs	Derek Samagalski	Connor Njegovan
2023–24	Brad Jacobs	Reid Carruthers	Derek Samagalski	Connor Njegovan
2024–25	Brad Jacobs	Marc Kennedy	Brett Gallant	Ben Hebert
2025–26	Brad Jacobs	Marc Kennedy	Brett Gallant	Ben Hebert
2026–27	Brad Jacobs	Marc Kennedy	Brett Gallant	Ben Hebert
