= 2017 Canadian Olympic Curling Trials =

- Host city: Ottawa, Ontario
- Arena: Canadian Tire Centre
- Dates: December 2–10
- Attendance: 121,301
- Men's winner: (Alberta) Kevin Koe
- Curling club: The Glencoe Club, Calgary
- Skip: Kevin Koe
- Third: Marc Kennedy
- Second: Brent Laing
- Lead: Ben Hebert
- Alternate: Scott Pfeifer
- Coach: John Dunn
- Finalist: (Manitoba) Mike McEwen
- Women's winner: (Ontario) Rachel Homan
- Curling club: Ottawa CC, Ottawa
- Skip: Rachel Homan
- Third: Emma Miskew
- Second: Joanne Courtney
- Lead: Lisa Weagle
- Alternate: Cheryl Kreviazuk
- Coach: Adam Kingsbury
- Finalist: (Alberta) Chelsea Carey

The 2017 Canadian Olympic Curling Trials (branded as the 2017 Tim Hortons Roar of the Rings for sponsorship reasons) were held from December 2 to 10 at the Canadian Tire Centre in Kanata, Ottawa, Ontario. The winners of the men's and women's events would represent Canada at the 2018 Winter Olympics.

The women's final was won by Team Rachel Homan in front of her home town crowd. She defeated Team Chelsea Carey 6–5, after Carey missed a pivotal double takeout on her last shot of the 10th end.

The men's final was won by Team Kevin Koe from Alberta. He defeated Team Mike McEwen 7–6, drawing to the button for one on the last stone of the 10th end.

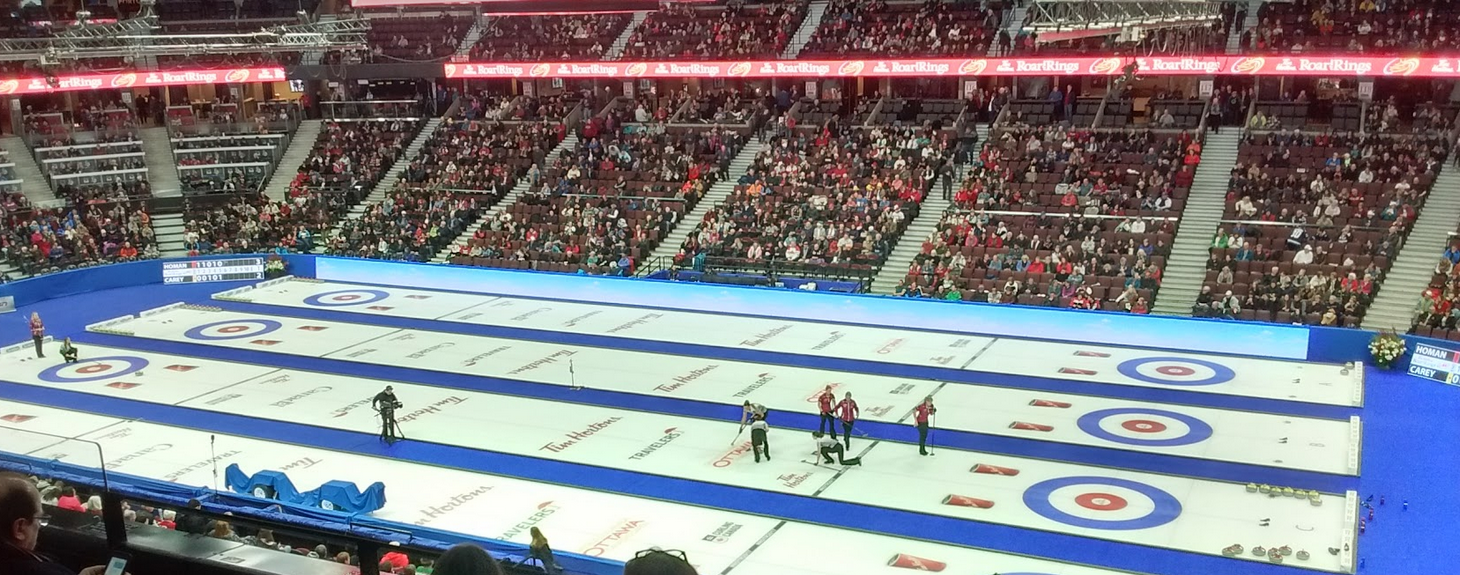
Team Homan takes on Team Carey in the 6th end of the women's final

== Men ==
=== Teams ===
Skip	Third	Second	Lead	Alternate	Club
Brendan Bottcher	Darren Moulding	Brad Thiessen	Karrick Martin	Jason Gunnlaugson	Saville Community SC, Edmonton, Alberta
Reid Carruthers	Braeden Moskowy	Derek Samagalski	Colin Hodgson	Craig Savill	West St. Paul CC, West St. Paul, Manitoba
John Epping	Mat Camm	Pat Janssen	Tim March	Charley Thomas	Leaside CC, East York, Toronto, Ontario
Brad Gushue	Mark Nichols	Brett Gallant	Geoff Walker	Tom Sallows	Re/Max Centre, St. John's, Newfoundland and Labrador
Brad Jacobs	Ryan Fry	E. J. Harnden (Note: Ryan Harnden threw second stones and Peter Steski threw lead stones during Draw 19.)	Ryan Harnden	Peter Steski	Community First CC, Sault Ste. Marie, Ontario
Kevin Koe	Marc Kennedy	Brent Laing	Ben Hebert	Scott Pfeifer	The Glencoe Club, Calgary, Alberta
Matt Dunstone (Fourth)	Steve Laycock (Skip)	Kirk Muyres	Dallan Muyres	Pat Simmons	Nutana CC, Saskatoon, Saskatchewan
Mike McEwen	B. J. Neufeld	Matt Wozniak	Denni Neufeld		Fort Rouge CC, Winnipeg, Manitoba
John Morris (Note: Jim Cotter threw fourth stones during Draws 16, 18 & 19.)	Jim Cotter	Catlin Schneider	Tyrel Griffith (Note: Rick Sawatsky threw lead stones during Draw 19.)	Rick Sawatsky	Vernon CC, Vernon, British Columbia

=== Round-robin standings ===
Final round-robin standings

Key
Teams to Playoffs

Skip	W	L	PF	PA	Ends Won	Ends Lost	Blank Ends	Stolen Ends	Shot Pct.
(Alberta) Kevin Koe	7	1	49	39	30	29	20	7	89.0%
(Newfoundland and Labrador) Brad Gushue	6	2	53	40	33	27	16	8	86.9%
(Manitoba) Mike McEwen	5	3	45	37	29	26	18	8	87.3%
(Alberta) Brendan Bottcher	4	4	53	51	35	30	15	8	84.9%
(Manitoba) Reid Carruthers	4	4	55	51	34	30	14	8	88.9%
(Ontario) Brad Jacobs	3	5	40	51	26	34	12	6	84.8%
(British Columbia) John Morris	3	5	43	50	25	35	16	3	84.4%
(Saskatchewan) Steve Laycock	2	6	44	58	29	33	14	5	82.7%
(Ontario) John Epping	2	6	42	47	29	29	19	10	85.3%

=== Scores ===
==== Draw 1 ====
Saturday, December 2, 2:00pm

Sheet C	1	2	3	4	5	6	7	8	9	10	Final
(Alberta) Kevin Koe 🔨	0	0	0	0	0	2	0	2	0	2	6
(Saskatchewan) Steve Laycock	0	0	1	0	0	0	1	0	1	0	3

Sheet D	1	2	3	4	5	6	7	8	9	10	Final
(British Columbia) John Morris	0	1	0	0	0	1	1	0	0	X	3
(Ontario) Brad Jacobs 🔨	1	0	0	0	1	0	0	2	1	X	5

==== Draw 2 ====
Saturday, December 2, 7:00pm

Sheet A	1	2	3	4	5	6	7	8	9	10	Final
(Ontario) John Epping	0	0	3	0	0	1	1	0	0	1	6
(Newfoundland and Labrador) Brad Gushue 🔨	0	1	0	1	2	0	0	0	0	0	4

Sheet B	1	2	3	4	5	6	7	8	9	10	Final
(Manitoba) Reid Carruthers 🔨	0	0	1	0	0	1	0	1	0	X	3
(Manitoba) Mike McEwen	0	0	0	1	2	0	3	0	1	X	7

==== Draw 3 ====
Sunday, December 3, 9:00am

Sheet A	1	2	3	4	5	6	7	8	9	10	11	Final
(Ontario) Brad Jacobs	1	0	0	2	0	1	0	0	2	0	0	6
(Alberta) Kevin Koe 🔨	0	0	1	0	1	0	2	0	0	2	2	8

Sheet D	1	2	3	4	5	6	7	8	9	10	Final
(Alberta) Brendan Bottcher 🔨	2	0	0	3	0	0	1	1	0	1	8
(Saskatchewan) Steve Laycock	0	0	1	0	3	0	0	0	2	0	6

==== Draw 4 ====
Sunday, December 3, 2:00pm

Sheet A	1	2	3	4	5	6	7	8	9	10	Final
(British Columbia) John Morris	0	0	1	0	0	0	0	0	0	X	1
(Manitoba) Mike McEwen 🔨	0	1	0	0	0	2	0	0	0	X	3

Sheet C	1	2	3	4	5	6	7	8	9	10	11	Final
(Alberta) Brendan Bottcher 🔨	0	1	0	0	1	0	0	1	0	2	0	5
(Newfoundland and Labrador) Brad Gushue	0	0	1	2	0	0	1	0	1	0	1	6

==== Draw 5 ====
Sunday, December 3, 7:00pm

Sheet B	1	2	3	4	5	6	7	8	9	10	Final
(Ontario) John Epping	0	0	1	0	0	1	0	2	0	X	4
(Saskatchewan) Steve Laycock 🔨	1	0	0	0	0	0	3	0	3	X	7

Sheet D	1	2	3	4	5	6	7	8	9	10	11	Final
(Manitoba) Reid Carruthers	0	0	0	3	0	1	0	0	0	1	0	5
(Alberta) Kevin Koe 🔨	0	2	1	0	0	0	0	0	2	0	1	6

==== Draw 6 ====
Monday, December 4, 9:00am

Sheet B	1	2	3	4	5	6	7	8	9	10	Final
(Newfoundland and Labrador) Brad Gushue 🔨	0	1	0	2	1	0	0	4	0	X	8
(British Columbia) John Morris	0	0	3	0	0	0	2	0	1	X	6

==== Draw 7 ====
Monday, December 4, 2:00pm

Sheet A	1	2	3	4	5	6	7	8	9	10	Final
(Saskatchewan) Steve Laycock 🔨	2	0	0	2	0	0	1	0	0	0	5
(Manitoba) Reid Carruthers	0	1	0	0	1	1	0	2	1	3	9

Sheet D	1	2	3	4	5	6	7	8	9	10	Final
(Manitoba) Mike McEwen 🔨	2	0	0	1	0	2	0	0	1	2	8
(Ontario) John Epping	0	0	2	0	1	0	0	2	0	0	5

==== Draw 8 ====
Monday, December 4, 7:00pm

Sheet B	1	2	3	4	5	6	7	8	9	10	Final
(Alberta) Kevin Koe	0	1	0	3	0	0	1	0	0	2	7
(Alberta) Brendan Bottcher 🔨	2	0	2	0	0	0	0	1	1	0	6

Sheet C	1	2	3	4	5	6	7	8	9	10	Final
(Newfoundland and Labrador) Brad Gushue	0	0	0	2	0	0	1	0	1	X	4
(Ontario) Brad Jacobs 🔨	0	1	3	0	0	1	0	2	0	X	7

==== Draw 9 ====
Tuesday, December 5, 9:00am

Sheet C	1	2	3	4	5	6	7	8	9	10	Final
(Manitoba) Reid Carruthers 🔨	2	0	0	0	1	0	3	0	0	1	7
(Ontario) John Epping	0	0	0	0	0	2	0	2	1	0	5

==== Draw 10 ====
Tuesday, December 5, 2:00pm

Sheet B	1	2	3	4	5	6	7	8	9	10	Final
(Ontario) Brad Jacobs	4	0	1	0	1	0	0	0	0	X	6
(Saskatchewan) Steve Laycock 🔨	0	1	0	1	0	2	1	0	3	X	8

Sheet C	1	2	3	4	5	6	7	8	9	10	Final
(Manitoba) Mike McEwen 🔨	0	1	1	0	0	1	0	0	2	0	5
(Alberta) Kevin Koe	0	0	0	3	0	0	1	1	0	1	6

==== Draw 11 ====
Tuesday, December 5, 7:00pm

Sheet A	1	2	3	4	5	6	7	8	9	10	Final
(Alberta) Brendan Bottcher 🔨	1	1	0	3	0	0	0	0	1	0	6
(British Columbia) John Morris	0	0	2	0	0	2	0	3	0	3	10

Sheet D	1	2	3	4	5	6	7	8	9	10	Final
(Newfoundland and Labrador) Brad Gushue	0	3	0	0	1	0	1	0	4	X	9
(Manitoba) Reid Carruthers 🔨	1	0	1	0	0	2	0	1	0	X	5

==== Draw 12 ====
Wednesday, December 6, 9:00am

Sheet D	1	2	3	4	5	6	7	8	9	10	Final
(Saskatchewan) Steve Laycock 🔨	0	0	2	0	1	0	1	0	X	X	4
(Manitoba) Mike McEwen	1	2	0	2	0	4	0	1	X	X	10

==== Draw 13 ====
Wednesday, December 6, 2:00pm

Sheet A	1	2	3	4	5	6	7	8	9	10	Final
(Alberta) Kevin Koe 🔨	0	2	2	0	2	0	0	0	0	X	6
(Ontario) John Epping	0	0	0	0	0	0	2	1	1	X	4

Sheet D	1	2	3	4	5	6	7	8	9	10	Final
(Alberta) Brendan Bottcher	1	1	0	0	2	0	2	3	X	X	9
(Ontario) Brad Jacobs 🔨	0	0	2	0	0	1	0	0	X	X	3

==== Draw 14 ====
Wednesday, December 6, 7:00pm

Sheet B	1	2	3	4	5	6	7	8	9	10	Final
(Manitoba) Mike McEwen 🔨	0	0	0	1	0	0	2	0	0	X	3
(Newfoundland and Labrador) Brad Gushue	0	3	0	0	2	1	0	1	1	X	8

Sheet C	1	2	3	4	5	6	7	8	9	10	Final
(British Columbia) John Morris	0	0	1	0	1	0	2	0	2	0	6
(Manitoba) Reid Carruthers 🔨	1	2	0	1	0	1	0	2	0	3	10

==== Draw 15 ====
Thursday, December 7, 9:00am

Sheet A	1	2	3	4	5	6	7	8	9	10	Final
(Ontario) Brad Jacobs 🔨	1	0	2	0	0	2	0	0	X	X	5
(Manitoba) Reid Carruthers	0	2	0	4	1	0	2	0	X	X	9

==== Draw 16 ====
Thursday, December 7, 2:00pm

Sheet B	1	2	3	4	5	6	7	8	9	10	Final
(British Columbia) John Morris	0	1	0	2	0	0	1	0	0	X	4
(Alberta) Kevin Koe 🔨	1	0	1	0	2	0	0	2	1	X	7

Sheet C	1	2	3	4	5	6	7	8	9	10	11	Final
(Ontario) John Epping 🔨	0	1	0	0	1	0	0	1	0	3	0	6
(Alberta) Brendan Bottcher	0	0	2	1	0	1	0	0	2	0	1	7

==== Draw 17 ====
Thursday, December 7, 7:00pm

Sheet A	1	2	3	4	5	6	7	8	9	10	Final
(Newfoundland and Labrador) Brad Gushue 🔨	2	0	0	0	0	2	0	3	0	1	8
(Saskatchewan) Steve Laycock	0	0	1	0	1	0	1	0	2	0	5

Sheet C	1	2	3	4	5	6	7	8	9	10	Final
(Ontario) Brad Jacobs 🔨	0	2	0	2	0	1	0	0	1	X	6
(Manitoba) Mike McEwen	0	0	1	0	0	0	1	1	0	X	3

==== Draw 18 ====
Friday, December 8, 9:00am

Sheet A	1	2	3	4	5	6	7	8	9	10	Final
(Manitoba) Mike McEwen	0	1	0	1	0	0	0	3	1	X	6
(Alberta) Brendan Bottcher 🔨	1	0	1	0	2	0	0	0	0	X	4

Sheet D	1	2	3	4	5	6	7	8	9	10	11	Final
(Ontario) John Epping 🔨	1	0	1	0	1	1	0	0	0	1	0	5
(British Columbia) John Morris	0	1	0	2	0	0	0	0	2	0	1	6

==== Draw 19 ====
Friday, December 8, 2:00pm

Sheet B	1	2	3	4	5	6	7	8	9	10	Final
(Ontario) Brad Jacobs	0	1	0	0	0	0	1	X	X	X	2
(Ontario) John Epping 🔨	0	0	1	1	3	2	0	X	X	X	7

Sheet C	1	2	3	4	5	6	7	8	9	10	Final
(Saskatchewan) Steve Laycock 🔨	2	0	1	0	0	1	0	0	1	1	6
(British Columbia) John Morris	0	1	0	2	2	0	2	0	0	0	7

==== Draw 20 ====
Friday, December 8, 7:00pm

Sheet B	1	2	3	4	5	6	7	8	9	10	11	Final
(Alberta) Brendan Bottcher	0	2	0	2	0	0	2	0	1	0	1	8
(Manitoba) Reid Carruthers 🔨	0	0	2	0	1	0	0	2	0	2	0	7

Sheet D	1	2	3	4	5	6	7	8	9	10	Final
(Alberta) Kevin Koe	0	0	2	0	1	0	0	0	0	X	3
(Newfoundland and Labrador) Brad Gushue 🔨	0	1	0	2	0	1	1	0	1	X	6

=== Playoffs ===
Semifinal			Final
			1	(Alberta) Kevin Koe	7
2	(Newfoundland and Labrador) Brad Gushue	4	3	(Manitoba) Mike McEwen	6
3	(Manitoba) Mike McEwen	6

==== Semifinal ====
Saturday, December 9, 7:00 pm

Sheet C	1	2	3	4	5	6	7	8	9	10	Final
(Newfoundland and Labrador) Brad Gushue 🔨	1	0	0	1	0	1	0	0	1	X	4
(Manitoba) Mike McEwen	0	0	1	0	2	0	1	2	0	X	6

Player percentages
(Newfoundland and Labrador) Brad Gushue		(Manitoba) Mike McEwen	
Geoff Walker	90%	Denni Neufeld	89%
Brett Gallant	80%	Matt Wozniak	86%
Mark Nichols	81%	B.J. Neufeld	85%
Brad Gushue	81%	Mike McEwen	88%
Total	83%	Total	87%

==== Final ====
Sunday, December 10, 7:00 pm

Sheet C	1	2	3	4	5	6	7	8	9	10	Final
(Alberta) Kevin Koe 🔨	1	0	1	0	2	1	0	1	0	1	7
(Manitoba) Mike McEwen	0	1	0	2	0	0	2	0	1	0	6

Player percentages
(Alberta) Kevin Koe		(Manitoba) Mike McEwen	
Ben Hebert	93%	Denni Neufeld	91%
Brent Laing	79%	Matt Wozniak	66%
Marc Kennedy	91%	B.J. Neufeld	78%
Kevin Koe	88%	Mike McEwen	95%
Total	88%	Total	83%

=== Player percentages ===
After round robin play; includes games played at other positions

Leads	%	Seconds	%	Thirds	%	Skips	%
Karrick Martin	86.3	Brad Thiessen	86.9	Darren Moulding	85.3	Brendan Bottcher	81.1
Colin Hodgson	92.0	Derek Samagalski	91.1	Braeden Moskowy	85.9	Reid Carruthers	86.5
Tim March	88.8	Pat Janssen	84.8	Mat Camm	85.4	John Epping	82.1
Geoff Walker	88.1	Brett Gallant	86.7	Mark Nichols	86.1	Brad Gushue	86.8
Ryan Harnden	87.3	E. J. Harnden	88.4	Ryan Fry	84.6	Brad Jacobs	79.3
Ben Hebert	91.8	Brent Laing	90.1	Marc Kennedy	86.4	Kevin Koe	87.7
Dallan Muyres	85.3	Kirk Muyres	83.8	Steve Laycock	82.7	Matt Dunstone	78.9
Denni Neufeld	90.1	Matt Wozniak	88.4	B. J. Neufeld	85.0	Mike McEwen	85.3
Tyrel Griffith	86.3	Catlin Schneider	83.5	Jim Cotter	85.6	John Morris	82.9

== Women ==
=== Teams ===
Skip	Third	Second	Lead	Alternate	Club
Chelsea Carey	Cathy Overton-Clapham	Jocelyn Peterman	Laine Peters		The Glencoe Club, Calgary, Alberta
Michelle Englot	Kate Cameron	Leslie Wilson-Westcott	Raunora Westcott	Jolene Campbell	Granite CC, Winnipeg, Manitoba
Allison Flaxey	Clancy Grandy	Lynn Kreviazuk	Morgan Court	Alison Kreviazuk	Granite Club, Toronto, Ontario
Rachel Homan	Emma Miskew	Joanne Courtney	Lisa Weagle	Cheryl Kreviazuk	Ottawa CC, Ottawa, Ontario
Jennifer Jones	Kaitlyn Lawes	Jill Officer	Dawn McEwen	Jennifer Clark-Rouire	St. Vital CC, Winnipeg, Manitoba
Krista McCarville	Kendra Lilly	Ashley Sippala	Sarah Potts	Lee Merklinger	Fort William CC, Thunder Bay, Ontario
Casey Scheidegger	Cary-Anne McTaggart	Jessie Scheidegger	Kristie Moore	Susan O'Connor	Lethbridge CC, Lethbridge, Alberta
Val Sweeting	Lori Olson-Johns	Dana Ferguson	Rachelle Brown	Sarah Wilkes	Saville Community SC, Edmonton, Alberta
Julie Tippin	Chantal Duhaime	Rachelle Vink	Tess Bobbie	Sherry Middaugh	Woodstock CC, Woodstock, Ontario

=== Round-robin standings ===
Final round-robin standings

Key
Teams to Playoffs

Skip	W	L	PF	PA	Ends Won	Ends Lost	Blank Ends	Stolen Ends	Shot Pct.
(Alberta) Chelsea Carey	8	0	63	36	38	25	10	15	82.0%
(Ontario) Rachel Homan	7	1	58	43	31	33	11	4	83.7%
(Manitoba) Jennifer Jones	5	3	59	52	33	33	5	7	81.5%
(Alberta) Val Sweeting	4	4	51	52	33	34	7	7	80.5%
(Ontario) Krista McCarville	4	4	46	41	31	33	14	6	82.9%
(Alberta) Casey Scheidegger	3	5	55	59	39	40	3	7	82.0%
(Manitoba) Michelle Englot	2	6	49	68	36	36	2	6	74.6%
(Ontario) Julie Tippin	2	6	48	63	32	33	7	7	77.4%
(Ontario) Allison Flaxey	1	7	44	59	29	35	6	2	75.0%

=== Scores ===
==== Draw 1 ====
Saturday, December 2, 2:00pm

Sheet A	1	2	3	4	5	6	7	8	9	10	Final
(Alberta) Casey Scheidegger 🔨	0	1	0	1	0	1	0	2	0	1	6
(Ontario) Allison Flaxey	0	0	1	0	2	0	1	0	1	0	5

Sheet B	1	2	3	4	5	6	7	8	9	10	Final
(Ontario) Rachel Homan	0	1	0	2	0	1	0	0	0	X	4
(Alberta) Chelsea Carey 🔨	1	0	2	0	2	0	0	2	1	X	8

==== Draw 2 ====
Saturday, December 2, 7:00pm

Sheet C	1	2	3	4	5	6	7	8	9	10	Final
(Manitoba) Michelle Englot 🔨	0	1	0	1	1	0	1	0	0	X	4
(Ontario) Krista McCarville	1	0	2	0	0	2	0	2	2	X	9

Sheet D	1	2	3	4	5	6	7	8	9	10	Final
(Alberta) Val Sweeting	3	0	1	0	1	0	1	0	0	X	6
(Manitoba) Jennifer Jones 🔨	0	2	0	1	0	2	0	1	3	X	9

==== Draw 3 ====
Sunday, December 3, 9:00am

Sheet B	1	2	3	4	5	6	7	8	9	10	Final
(Manitoba) Jennifer Jones 🔨	3	0	1	0	2	0	1	0	1	X	8
(Manitoba) Michelle Englot	0	2	0	1	0	1	0	1	0	X	5

Sheet C	1	2	3	4	5	6	7	8	9	10	Final
(Alberta) Val Sweeting 🔨	0	2	0	0	0	1	0	0	0	X	3
(Ontario) Julie Tippin	0	0	2	0	0	0	1	3	1	X	7

==== Draw 4 ====
Sunday, December 3, 2:00pm

Sheet B	1	2	3	4	5	6	7	8	9	10	Final
(Alberta) Casey Scheidegger	0	2	0	1	1	0	0	1	0	2	7
(Ontario) Krista McCarville 🔨	1	0	1	0	0	1	0	0	2	0	5

Sheet D	1	2	3	4	5	6	7	8	9	10	Final
(Ontario) Rachel Homan 🔨	2	0	3	0	2	0	0	0	0	1	8
(Ontario) Julie Tippin	0	1	0	2	0	1	1	1	1	0	7

==== Draw 5 ====
Sunday, December 3, 7:00pm

Sheet A	1	2	3	4	5	6	7	8	9	10	Final
(Alberta) Val Sweeting 🔨	0	0	0	1	0	2	1	0	0	X	4
(Alberta) Chelsea Carey	2	0	1	0	2	0	0	1	1	X	7

Sheet C	1	2	3	4	5	6	7	8	9	10	Final
(Manitoba) Jennifer Jones 🔨	2	1	0	2	1	0	0	4	X	X	10
(Ontario) Allison Flaxey	0	0	2	0	0	2	1	0	X	X	5

==== Draw 6 ====
Monday, December 4, 9:00am

Sheet A	1	2	3	4	5	6	7	8	9	10	Final
(Ontario) Krista McCarville	0	0	0	1	0	0	1	0	0	0	2
(Ontario) Rachel Homan 🔨	0	1	1	0	1	0	0	0	0	1	4

==== Draw 7 ====
Monday, December 4, 2:00pm

Sheet B	1	2	3	4	5	6	7	8	9	10	Final
(Ontario) Allison Flaxey	1	1	0	1	0	2	0	0	X	X	5
(Alberta) Val Sweeting 🔨	0	0	3	0	4	0	2	1	X	X	10

Sheet C	1	2	3	4	5	6	7	8	9	10	11	Final
(Alberta) Chelsea Carey 🔨	0	1	1	1	0	0	3	0	1	0	1	8
(Alberta) Casey Scheidegger	1	0	0	0	2	2	0	1	0	1	0	7

==== Draw 8 ====
Monday, December 4, 7:00pm

Sheet A	1	2	3	4	5	6	7	8	9	10	Final
(Ontario) Julie Tippin	0	2	2	0	1	0	1	0	X	X	6
(Manitoba) Jennifer Jones 🔨	2	0	0	4	0	3	0	3	X	X	12

Sheet D	1	2	3	4	5	6	7	8	9	10	Final
(Manitoba) Michelle Englot 🔨	1	0	2	0	1	1	0	2	0	X	7
(Ontario) Rachel Homan	0	4	0	2	0	0	2	0	3	X	11

==== Draw 9 ====
Tuesday, December 5, 9:00am

Sheet D	1	2	3	4	5	6	7	8	9	10	Final
(Alberta) Chelsea Carey 🔨	2	1	0	2	2	0	2	0	X	X	9
(Ontario) Allison Flaxey	0	0	1	0	0	1	0	1	X	X	3

==== Draw 10 ====
Tuesday, December 5, 2:00pm

Sheet A	1	2	3	4	5	6	7	8	9	10	Final
(Manitoba) Michelle Englot	0	0	0	2	0	1	0	2	0	X	5
(Alberta) Val Sweeting 🔨	1	1	0	0	2	0	2	0	2	X	8

Sheet D	1	2	3	4	5	6	7	8	9	10	11	Final
(Manitoba) Jennifer Jones	0	1	0	0	2	0	2	0	1	1	1	8
(Alberta) Casey Scheidegger 🔨	2	0	0	2	0	1	0	2	0	0	0	7

==== Draw 11 ====
Tuesday, December 5, 7:00pm

Sheet B	1	2	3	4	5	6	7	8	9	10	Final
(Ontario) Krista McCarville 🔨	0	0	3	0	1	1	0	2	0	X	7
(Ontario) Julie Tippin	0	0	0	1	0	0	2	0	1	X	4

Sheet C	1	2	3	4	5	6	7	8	9	10	Final
(Ontario) Allison Flaxey 🔨	0	1	0	0	1	0	0	0	1	X	3
(Ontario) Rachel Homan	0	0	2	0	0	3	0	0	0	X	5

==== Draw 12 ====
Wednesday, December 6, 9:00am

Sheet C	1	2	3	4	5	6	7	8	9	10	Final
(Alberta) Casey Scheidegger	0	2	0	2	0	1	0	1	0	X	6
(Alberta) Val Sweeting 🔨	2	0	1	0	2	0	2	0	1	X	8

==== Draw 13 ====
Wednesday, December 6, 2:00pm

Sheet B	1	2	3	4	5	6	7	8	9	10	Final
(Alberta) Chelsea Carey 🔨	1	0	1	0	3	2	0	0	0	X	7
(Manitoba) Jennifer Jones	0	2	0	0	0	0	0	1	2	X	5

Sheet C	1	2	3	4	5	6	7	8	9	10	Final
(Ontario) Julie Tippin	0	1	0	2	0	1	0	2	0	X	6
(Manitoba) Michelle Englot 🔨	1	0	1	0	3	0	3	0	1	X	9

==== Draw 14 ====
Wednesday, December 6, 7:00pm

Sheet A	1	2	3	4	5	6	7	8	9	10	Final
(Ontario) Rachel Homan	0	0	2	0	0	2	0	2	0	4	10
(Alberta) Casey Scheidegger 🔨	1	1	0	2	1	0	1	0	1	0	7

Sheet D	1	2	3	4	5	6	7	8	9	10	Final
(Ontario) Allison Flaxey 🔨	0	3	0	2	0	1	0	1	0	0	7
(Ontario) Krista McCarville	0	0	1	0	1	0	2	0	2	2	8

==== Draw 15 ====
Thursday, December 7, 9:00am

Sheet B	1	2	3	4	5	6	7	8	9	10	11	Final
(Manitoba) Michelle Englot 🔨	1	0	1	0	2	1	0	1	1	0	1	8
(Ontario) Allison Flaxey	0	1	0	3	0	0	1	0	0	2	0	7

==== Draw 16 ====
Thursday, December 7, 2:00pm

Sheet A	1	2	3	4	5	6	7	8	9	10	Final
(Manitoba) Jennifer Jones	0	0	1	0	0	1	1	0	0	X	3
(Ontario) Krista McCarville 🔨	1	1	0	0	2	0	0	1	2	X	7

Sheet D	1	2	3	4	5	6	7	8	9	10	Final
(Ontario) Julie Tippin 🔨	0	4	0	1	0	2	0	1	0	0	8
(Alberta) Chelsea Carey	0	0	1	0	2	0	1	0	2	3	9

==== Draw 17 ====
Thursday, December 7, 7:00pm

Sheet B	1	2	3	4	5	6	7	8	9	10	Final
(Alberta) Val Sweeting	0	2	0	0	1	0	1	1	0	0	5
(Ontario) Rachel Homan 🔨	1	0	3	1	0	1	0	0	0	1	7

Sheet D	1	2	3	4	5	6	7	8	9	10	11	Final
(Alberta) Casey Scheidegger	0	0	1	0	4	0	0	2	0	1	1	9
(Manitoba) Michelle Englot 🔨	2	1	0	1	0	2	1	0	1	0	0	8

==== Draw 18 ====
Friday, December 8, 9:00am

Sheet B	1	2	3	4	5	6	7	8	9	10	Final
(Ontario) Julie Tippin 🔨	1	0	1	0	2	0	1	2	0	0	7
(Alberta) Casey Scheidegger	0	1	0	2	0	1	0	0	1	1	6

Sheet C	1	2	3	4	5	6	7	8	9	10	Final
(Ontario) Krista McCarville 🔨	0	1	0	0	0	1	0	0	0	0	2
(Alberta) Chelsea Carey	0	0	1	0	1	0	0	1	0	2	5

==== Draw 19 ====
Friday, December 8, 2:00pm

Sheet A	1	2	3	4	5	6	7	8	9	10	Final
(Alberta) Chelsea Carey 🔨	2	0	0	2	0	4	2	X	X	X	10
(Manitoba) Michelle Englot	0	2	0	0	1	0	0	X	X	X	3

Sheet D	1	2	3	4	5	6	7	8	9	10	11	Final
(Ontario) Krista McCarville	0	0	1	0	2	0	1	0	2	0	0	6
(Alberta) Val Sweeting 🔨	0	1	0	2	0	1	0	1	0	1	1	7

==== Draw 20 ====
Friday, December 8, 7:00pm

Sheet A	1	2	3	4	5	6	7	8	9	10	Final
(Ontario) Allison Flaxey 🔨	0	2	0	3	1	3	0	X	X	X	9
(Ontario) Julie Tippin	0	0	1	0	0	0	2	X	X	X	3

Sheet C	1	2	3	4	5	6	7	8	9	10	Final
(Ontario) Rachel Homan 🔨	2	0	1	2	0	0	2	2	X	X	9
(Manitoba) Jennifer Jones	0	1	0	0	0	3	0	0	X	X	4

=== Playoffs ===
Semifinal			Final
			1	(Alberta) Chelsea Carey	5
2	(Ontario) Rachel Homan	6	2	(Ontario) Rachel Homan	6
3	(Manitoba) Jennifer Jones	3

==== Semifinal ====
Saturday, December 9, 2:00 pm

Sheet C	1	2	3	4	5	6	7	8	9	10	Final
(Ontario) Rachel Homan 🔨	0	1	1	0	2	0	1	0	0	1	6
(Manitoba) Jennifer Jones	0	0	0	2	0	0	0	0	1	0	3

Player percentages
(Ontario) Rachel Homan		(Manitoba) Jennifer Jones	
Lisa Weagle	85%	Dawn McEwen	93%
Joanne Courtney	89%	Jill Officer	86%
Emma Miskew	81%	Kaitlyn Lawes	79%
Rachel Homan	93%	Jennifer Jones	76%
Total	87%	Total	84%

==== Final ====
Sunday, December 10, 2:00 pm

Sheet C	1	2	3	4	5	6	7	8	9	10	Final
(Alberta) Chelsea Carey 🔨	0	0	1	0	1	0	2	0	0	1	5
(Ontario) Rachel Homan	1	1	0	1	0	2	0	0	1	0	6

Player percentages
(Alberta) Chelsea Carey		(Ontario) Rachel Homan	
Laine Peters	98%	Lisa Weagle	91%
Jocelyn Peterman	93%	Joanne Courtney	88%
Cathy Overton-Clapham	81%	Emma Miskew	98%
Chelsea Carey	76%	Rachel Homan	88%
Total	87%	Total	91%

=== Player percentages ===
After round robin play

Leads	%	Seconds	%	Thirds	%	Skips	%
Laine Peters	89.2	Jocelyn Peterman	81.6	Cathy Overton-Clapham	77.3	Chelsea Carey	80.0
Raunora Westcott	86.4	Leslie Wilson-Westcott	72.1	Kate Cameron	73.7	Michelle Englot	66.1
Morgan Court	83.5	Lynn Kreviazuk	73.3	Clancy Grandy	72.0	Allison Flaxey	71.1
Lisa Weagle	81.0	Joanne Courtney	85.2	Emma Miskew	83.0	Rachel Homan	85.4
Dawn McEwen	91.5	Jill Officer	78.7	Kaitlyn Lawes	82.0	Jennifer Jones	73.6
Sarah Potts	85.4	Ashley Sippala	81.8	Kendra Lilly	81.8	Krista McCarville	82.4
Kristie Moore	88.1	Jessie Scheidegger	81.1	Cary-Anne McTaggart	78.9	Casey Scheidegger	79.8
Rachelle Brown	87.3	Dana Ferguson	82.0	Lori Olson-Johns	75.6	Val Sweeting	76.9
Tess Bobbie	80.3	Rachelle Vink	78.0	Chantal Duhaime	77.3	Julie Tippin	74.0

== Pre-trials ==
The pre-trials, officially called the Home Hardware Road to the Roar Pre-Trials took place from November 6 to 12 in Summerside, Prince Edward Island. The top two finishers of the men's and women's events qualified to participate in the Trials.

=== Men's ===
==== Teams ====
Skip	Third	Second	Lead	Alternate	Locale
Greg Balsdon	Don Bowser	Jonathan Beuk	Scott Chadwick	Robbie Doherty	Kingston, Ontario
Mark Bice	Aaron Squires	Tyler Morgan	Steve Bice	Jamie Farnell	Sarnia, Ontario
Brendan Bottcher	Darren Moulding	Brad Thiessen	Karrick Martin		Edmonton, Alberta
Adam Casey	Brock Montgomery	Shaun Meachem	Dustin Kidby		Regina, Saskatchewan
Dayna Deruelle	Kevin Flewwelling	David Staples	Sean Harrison	Andrew McGaugh	Brampton, Ontario
Colton Flasch	Kevin Marsh	Dan Marsh	Matt Lang		Saskatoon, Saskatchewan
Jason Gunnlaugson	Alex Forrest	Ian McMillan	Connor Njegovan		Winnipeg, Manitoba
Glenn Howard	Adam Spencer	David Mathers	Scott Howard		Etobicoke, Ontario
William Lyburn	Richard Daneault	Jared Kolomaya	Braden Zawada	Jim Coleman	Winnipeg, Manitoba
Jean-Michel Ménard	Martin Crête	Éric Sylvain	Philippe Ménard	Pierre Charette	Saint-Romuald, Quebec
John Morris	Jim Cotter	Catlin Schneider	Tyrel Griffith		Vernon, British Columbia
Jamie Murphy	Paul Flemming	Scott Saccary	Phil Crowell	Jordan Pinder	Halifax, Nova Scotia
Pat Simmons	Colton Lott	Kyle Doering	Rob Gordon		Winnipeg, Manitoba
Charley Thomas	Mick Lizmore	Brandon Klassen (Note: Nicholas Connolly threw second stones for the last round robin game and playoffs due to Brandon Klassen falling ill.)	D. J. Kidby	Nicholas Connolly	Edmonton, Alberta

==== Standings ====
Final round-robin standings

Key
Teams to Playoffs
Teams to Tiebreaker

Pool A	W	L
(Ontario) Glenn Howard	6	0
(British Columbia) John Morris	3	3
(Manitoba) Jason Gunnlaugson	3	3
(Nova Scotia) Jamie Murphy	3	3
(Ontario) Mark Bice	2	4
(Saskatchewan) Colton Flasch	2	4
(Saskatchewan) Adam Casey	2	4

Pool B	W	L
(Alberta) Charley Thomas	5	1
(Alberta) Brendan Bottcher	3	3
(Ontario) Greg Balsdon	3	3
(Ontario) Dayna Deruelle	3	3
(Manitoba) William Lyburn	3	3
(Quebec) Jean-Michel Ménard	2	4
(Manitoba) Pat Simmons	2	4

==== Tiebreakers ====
===== Tiebreaker 1 =====
Saturday, November 11, 07:30

Team	1	2	3	4	5	6	7	8	9	10	Final
(Manitoba) William Lyburn	0	0	0	1	1	0	0	2	0	1	5
(Ontario) Dayna Deruelle 🔨	1	3	0	0	0	0	2	0	1	0	7

Team	1	2	3	4	5	6	7	8	9	10	Final
(Nova Scotia) Jamie Murphy 🔨	0	2	0	0	0	1	0	1	0	0	4
(Manitoba) Jason Gunnlaugson	1	0	0	1	1	0	2	0	0	1	6

===== Tiebreaker 2 =====
Saturday, November 11, 15:30

Team	1	2	3	4	5	6	7	8	9	10	Final
(Ontario) Greg Balsdon 🔨	1	0	0	2	0	0	2	0	0	1	6
(Ontario) Dayna Deruelle	0	1	1	0	1	0	0	0	1	0	4

==== Playoffs ====
A Semifinals			A Finals
A1	(Ontario) Glenn Howard	2
B2	(Alberta) Brendan Bottcher	6	B2	(Alberta) Brendan Bottcher	3
B1	(Alberta) Charley Thomas	2	A2	(British Columbia) John Morris	4
A2	(British Columbia) John Morris	4

B Quarterfinals			B Semifinals			B Finals
A3	(Manitoba) Jason Gunnlaugson	2
A1	(Ontario) Glenn Howard	5	A1	(Ontario) Glenn Howard	7
B3	(Ontario) Greg Balsdon	8	B3	(Ontario) Greg Balsdon	6
B1	(Alberta) Charley Thomas	5				A1	(Ontario) Glenn Howard	5
						B2	(Alberta) Brendan Bottcher	9

===== A Semifinals =====
Saturday, November 11, 13:30

Team	1	2	3	4	5	6	7	8	9	10	Final
(Ontario) Glenn Howard 🔨	0	0	1	0	0	0	1	0	X	X	2
(Alberta) Brendan Bottcher	0	0	0	0	4	0	0	2	X	X	6

Team	1	2	3	4	5	6	7	8	9	10	Final
(Alberta) Charley Thomas 🔨	0	0	0	1	0	0	0	0	1	X	2
(British Columbia) John Morris	1	1	0	0	0	1	0	1	0	X	4

===== A Finals =====
Sunday, November 12, 9:00

Team	1	2	3	4	5	6	7	8	9	10	Final
(Alberta) Brendan Bottcher	0	0	0	1	0	1	0	1	0	0	3
(British Columbia) John Morris 🔨	1	0	0	0	1	0	1	0	0	1	4

===== B Quarterfinals =====
Saturday, November 11, 19:00

Team	1	2	3	4	5	6	7	8	9	10	Final
(Manitoba) Jason Gunnlaugson	0	0	0	0	0	0	1	0	1	0	2
(Ontario) Glenn Howard 🔨	1	0	1	1	0	0	0	1	0	1	5

Saturday, November 11, 20:30

Team	1	2	3	4	5	6	7	8	9	10	Final
(Ontario) Greg Balsdon	0	0	0	5	1	0	1	0	1	X	8
(Alberta) Charley Thomas 🔨	0	2	0	0	0	2	0	1	0	X	5

===== B Semifinals =====
Sunday, November 12, 14:00

Team	1	2	3	4	5	6	7	8	9	10	11	Final
(Ontario) Glenn Howard 🔨	1	0	0	0	2	0	1	0	2	0	1	7
(Ontario) Greg Balsdon	0	0	0	1	0	2	0	1	0	2	0	6

===== B Finals =====
Sunday, November 12, 19:30

Team	1	2	3	4	5	6	7	8	9	10	Final
(Ontario) Glenn Howard 🔨	1	0	0	0	1	0	2	1	0	0	5
(Alberta) Brendan Bottcher	0	1	1	0	0	2	0	0	2	3	9

=== Women's ===
==== Teams ====
Skip	Third	Second	Lead	Alternate	Locale
Shannon Birchard	Nicole Sigvaldason	Sheyna Andries	Mariah Mondor	Sarah Pyke	Winnipeg, Manitoba
Theresa Breen	Marlee Powers	Jocelyn Adams	Amanda Simpson		Halifax, Nova Scotia
Kerri Einarson	Selena Kaatz	Liz Fyfe	Kristin MacCuish		East St. Paul, Manitoba
Tracy Fleury	Crystal Webster	Jenna Walsh	Amanda Gates	Jennifer Wylie	Sudbury, Ontario
Jacqueline Harrison	Janet Murphy	Stephanie Matheson	Melissa Foster	Jestyn Murphy	Mississauga, Ontario
Shannon Kleibrink	Sarah Wilkes	Kalynn Park	Alison Thiessen		Okotoks, Alberta
Krista McCarville	Kendra Lilly	Ashley Sippala	Sarah Potts		Thunder Bay, Ontario
Briane Meilleur	Breanne Knapp	Janelle Vachon	Sarah Neufeld		Winnipeg, Manitoba
Sherry Middaugh	Jo-Ann Rizzo	Lee Merklinger	Leigh Armstrong	Kim Tuck	Coldwater, Ontario
Darcy Robertson	Karen Klein	Vanessa Foster	Theresa Cannon		Winnipeg, Manitoba
Kelsey Rocque	Laura Crocker	Taylor McDonald	Jen Gates		Edmonton, Alberta
Nadine Scotland	Heather Jensen	Rebecca Konschuh	Heather Rogers	Whitney Eckstrand	Calgary, Alberta
Karla Thompson	Kristen Recksiedler	Shannon Joanisse	Trysta Vandale		Kamloops, British Columbia
Julie Tippin	Chantal Duhaime	Rachelle Vink	Tess Bobbie		Woodstock, Ontario

==== Standings ====
Final round-robin standings

Key
Teams to Playoffs
Teams to Tiebreakers

Pool A	W	L
(Ontario) Julie Tippin	4	2
(Alberta) Kelsey Rocque	3	3
(Alberta) Nadine Scotland	3	3
(Manitoba) Shannon Birchard	3	3
(Nova Scotia) Theresa Breen	3	3
(Alberta) Shannon Kleibrink	3	3
(Ontario) Tracy Fleury	2	4

Pool B	W	L
(Ontario) Krista McCarville	4	2
(Manitoba) Briane Meilleur	4	2
(Ontario) Sherry Middaugh	4	2
(Manitoba) Kerri Einarson	4	2
(Ontario) Jacqueline Harrison	2	4
(Manitoba) Darcy Robertson	2	4
(British Columbia) Karla Thompson	1	5

==== Tiebreakers ====
===== Tiebreaker 1 =====
Friday, November 10, 23:30

Team	1	2	3	4	5	6	7	8	9	10	Final
(Alberta) Nadine Scotland 🔨	3	0	1	1	0	0	2	0	2	X	9
(Nova Scotia) Theresa Breen	0	1	0	0	1	1	0	2	0	X	5

Team	1	2	3	4	5	6	7	8	9	10	11	Final
(Manitoba) Shannon Birchard	0	2	1	0	1	0	1	0	1	0	1	7
(Alberta) Shannon Kleibrink 🔨	1	0	0	1	0	1	0	1	0	2	0	6

===== Tiebreaker 2 =====
Saturday, November 11, 07:30

Team	1	2	3	4	5	6	7	8	9	10	Final
(Manitoba) Kerri Einarson 🔨	0	1	0	1	1	0	1	0	1	0	5
(Ontario) Sherry Middaugh	0	0	2	0	0	3	0	0	0	1	6

===== Tiebreaker 3 =====
Saturday, November 11, 12:30

Team	1	2	3	4	5	6	7	8	9	10	Final
(Alberta) Nadine Scotland 🔨	0	0	1	1	1	0	0	1	0	1	5
(Manitoba) Shannon Birchard	0	1	0	0	0	0	2	0	1	0	4

==== Playoffs ====
A Semifinals			A Finals
A1	(Ontario) Julie Tippin	5
B2	(Manitoba) Briane Meilleur	7	B2	(Manitoba) Briane Meilleur	5
B1	(Ontario) Krista McCarville	8	B1	(Ontario) Krista McCarville	7
A2	(Alberta) Kelsey Rocque	4

B Quarterfinals			B Semifinals			B Finals
A3	(Alberta) Nadine Scotland	3
A1	(Ontario) Julie Tippin	7	A1	(Ontario) Julie Tippin	8
B3	(Ontario) Sherry Middaugh	3	A2	(Alberta) Kelsey Rocque	5
A2	(Alberta) Kelsey Rocque	6				A1	(Ontario) Julie Tippin	8
						B2	(Manitoba) Briane Meilleur	3

===== A Semifinals =====
Saturday, November 11, 13:30

Team	1	2	3	4	5	6	7	8	9	10	Final
(Ontario) Julie Tippin 🔨	1	2	1	0	0	0	1	0	0	X	5
(Manitoba) Briane Meilleur	0	0	0	1	2	3	0	0	1	X	7

Team	1	2	3	4	5	6	7	8	9	10	Final
(Ontario) Krista McCarville 🔨	2	0	2	0	1	0	2	0	1	X	8
(Alberta) Kelsey Rocque	0	1	0	1	0	1	0	1	0	X	4

===== A Finals =====
Saturday, November 11, 19:00

Team	1	2	3	4	5	6	7	8	9	10	Final
(Manitoba) Briane Meilleur	0	0	0	2	0	1	0	0	2	0	5
(Ontario) Krista McCarville 🔨	0	2	0	0	2	0	0	2	0	1	7

===== B Quarterfinals =====
Saturday, November 11, 19:00

Team	1	2	3	4	5	6	7	8	9	10	Final
(Alberta) Nadine Scotland	0	0	0	0	1	1	0	1	0	X	3
(Ontario) Julie Tippin 🔨	0	2	1	1	0	0	1	0	2	X	7

Team	1	2	3	4	5	6	7	8	9	10	Final
(Ontario) Sherry Middaugh 🔨	0	0	1	0	0	1	0	0	1	0	3
(Alberta) Kelsey Rocque	0	0	0	1	1	0	0	3	0	1	6

===== B Semifinals =====
Sunday, November 12, 9:00

Team	1	2	3	4	5	6	7	8	9	10	Final
(Ontario) Julie Tippin 🔨	0	2	0	1	0	2	2	1	0	X	8
(Alberta) Kelsey Rocque	0	0	2	0	1	0	0	0	2	X	5

===== B Finals =====
Sunday, November 12, 14:00

Team	1	2	3	4	5	6	7	8	9	10	Final
(Ontario) Julie Tippin 🔨	2	0	2	1	2	0	0	1	X	X	8
(Manitoba) Briane Meilleur	0	1	0	0	0	1	1	0	X	X	3

== Qualification process ==
The qualification process for the 2017 Olympic trials differed slightly from the process used at the 2013 trials. For both the men's and women's categories, a pool of twenty-one teams is designated as eligible to represent Canada at the 2018 Olympics, based on rankings from the Canadian Team Ranking System (CTRS). From the pool of twenty-one, seven teams were selected to qualify directly for the 2017 Canadian Curling Trials in December. The remaining fourteen teams competed in a pre-trials tournament, and the top two teams qualified for the nine-team trials. The winner of each trials will represent Canada at the 2018 Winter Olympics.

Nine teams qualify for the Olympic Trials based on the following criteria. These are the final berths as decided on May 2, 2017

=== Men ===
Qualification method	Qualifying team	Scenario if team has already qualified
Winner of 2015 Canada Cup	(Alberta) Kevin Koe	None (first qualifier)
Winner of 2017 Brier (Note: Must medal at Worlds. If that criterion is not met, the berth will go to the highest team not yet qualified from that season's CTRS standings. Jennifer Jones replaced Chelsea Carey's berth as the 2016 Scotties winner due to this clause.)	(Newfoundland and Labrador) Brad Gushue	First on the 2016-17 CTRS not already qualified
Winner of 2016 Canada Cup	(Manitoba) Reid Carruthers	Next team on the 2016–17 CTRS not already qualified
Winner of 2017 Brier	(Ontario) Brad Jacobs	Next team on the 2016–17 CTRS not already qualified
CTRS Leader for 2015–17 (two year total)	(Manitoba) Mike McEwen	Next team on the 2015–17 CTRS not already qualified
CTRS Leader for 2016–17	(Ontario) John Epping	Next team on the 2016–17 CTRS not already qualified
CTRS Runner-up for 2016–17	(Saskatchewan) Steve Laycock	Next team on the 2016–17 CTRS not already qualified
Pre-Trial Qualifier #1	(British Columbia) John Morris	(None)
Pre-Trial Qualifier #2	(Alberta) Brendan Bottcher	(None)

=== Women ===
Qualification method	Qualifying team	Scenario if team has already qualified
Winner of 2015 Canada Cup	(Ontario) Rachel Homan	None (first qualifier)
Winner of 2016 Scotties	(Manitoba) Jennifer Jones	First team on the 2016-17 CTRS not already qualified
Winner of 2016 Canada Cup	(Ontario) Allison Flaxey	Next team on the 2016–17 CTRS not already qualified
Winner of 2017 Scotties	(Alberta) Val Sweeting	Next team on the 2016–17 CTRS not already qualified
CTRS Leader for 2015–17 (two year total)	(Alberta) Chelsea Carey	Next team on the 2015–17 CTRS not already qualified
CTRS Leader for 2016–17	(Alberta) Casey Scheidegger	Next team on the 2016–17 CTRS not already qualified
CTRS Runner-up for 2016–17	(Manitoba) Michelle Englot	Next team on the 2016–17 CTRS not already qualified
Pre-Trial Qualifier #1	(Ontario) Krista McCarville	(None)
Pre-Trial Qualifier #2	(Ontario) Julie Tippin	(None)
