= 2013 The National =

Grand Slam of Curling event

- Host city: Port Hawkesbury, Nova Scotia
- Arena: Port Hawkesbury Civic Centre
- Dates: January 23–27
- Winner: (Manitoba) Jeff Stoughton
- Curling club: Charleswood CC, Winnipeg
- Skip: Jeff Stoughton
- Third: Jon Mead
- Second: Reid Carruthers
- Lead: Mark Nichols
- Finalist: (Manitoba) Mike McEwen

The 2013 National was held from January 23 to 27 at the Port Hawkesbury Civic Centre in Port Hawkesbury, Nova Scotia. It was the third men's Grand Slam event of the 2012–13 curling season. The purse for the event was CAD$100,000. In the final, Jeff Stoughton defeated a struggling Mike McEwen with a score of 8–2 in six ends.

== Teams ==
The teams are listed as follows:

Skip	Third	Second	Lead	Locale
Greg Balsdon	Mark Bice	Tyler Morgan	Jamie Farnell	Toronto, Ontario
Jim Cotter	Jason Gunnlaugson	Tyrel Griffith	Rick Sawatsky	Kelowna/Vernon, British Columbia
Benoît Schwarz (fourth)	Peter de Cruz (skip)	Dominik Märki	Valentin Tanner	Geneva, Switzerland
Niklas Edin	Sebastian Kraupp	Fredrik Lindberg	Viktor Kjäll	Karlstad, Sweden
John Epping	Scott Bailey	Scott Howard	David Mathers	Toronto, Ontario
Rob Fowler	Allan Lyburn	Richard Daneault	Derek Samagalski	Brandon, Manitoba
Brad Gushue	Adam Casey	Brett Gallant	Geoff Walker	St. John's, Newfoundland and Labrador
Glenn Howard	Wayne Middaugh	Brent Laing	Craig Savill	Coldwater, Ontario
Brad Jacobs	Ryan Fry	E. J. Harnden	Ryan Harnden	Sault Ste. Marie, Ontario
Mark Kean	Travis Fanset	Patrick Janssen	Tim March	Toronto, Ontario
Kevin Koe	Pat Simmons	Carter Rycroft	Nolan Thiessen	Calgary, Alberta
Steve Laycock	Kirk Muyres	Colton Flasch	Dallan Muyres	Saskatoon, Saskatchewan
Kevin Martin	John Morris	Marc Kennedy	Ben Hebert	Edmonton, Alberta
Mike McEwen	B. J. Neufeld	Matt Wozniak	Denni Neufeld	Winnipeg, Manitoba
Sven Michel	Claudio Pätz	Sandro Trolliet	Simon Gempeler	Adelboden, Switzerland
Rob Rumfeldt	Adam Spencer	Scott Hodgson	Greg Robinson	Guelph, Ontario
Jeff Stoughton	Jon Mead	Reid Carruthers	Mark Nichols	Winnipeg, Manitoba
Thomas Ulsrud	Torger Nergård	Christoffer Svae	Håvard Vad Petersson	Oslo, Norway

== Round-robin standings ==
Final round-robin standings

Key
Teams to Playoffs
Teams to Tiebreaker

Pool A	W	L	PF	PA
(Manitoba) Rob Fowler	4	0	29	13
(Sweden) Niklas Edin	3	2	24	25
(Ontario) Greg Balsdon	2	3	24	31
(Ontario) Glenn Howard	2	3	27	29
(Switzerland) Sven Michel	2	3	30	28
(Ontario) John Epping	1	4	21	34

Pool B	W	L	PF	PA
(Ontario) Brad Jacobs	4	1	25	12
(Manitoba) Mike McEwen	4	1	27	15
(Manitoba) Jeff Stoughton	3	2	22	22
(British Columbia) Jim Cotter	2	3	21	26
(Switzerland) Peter de Cruz	1	4	20	30
(Ontario) Mark Kean	1	4	19	29

Pool C	W	L	PF	PA
(Alberta) Kevin Martin	5	0	35	23
(Alberta) Kevin Koe	3	2	27	23
(Newfoundland and Labrador) Brad Gushue	3	2	27	28
(Saskatchewan) Steve Laycock	3	2	25	22
(Norway) Thomas Ulsrud	1	4	28	30
(Ontario) Rob Rumfeldt	0	5	16	32

== Round-robin results ==
All draw times are listed in Atlantic Standard Time (UTC-4).

=== Draw 1 ===
Wednesday, January 23, 7:00 pm

Sheet A	1	2	3	4	5	6	7	8	Final
(Alberta) Kevin Martin 🔨	3	0	0	2	0	2	0	X	7
(Newfoundland and Labrador) Brad Gushue	0	0	1	0	2	0	1	X	4

Sheet B	1	2	3	4	5	6	7	8	9	Final
(Ontario) Glenn Howard 🔨	2	0	0	0	2	0	1	0	0	5
(Ontario) John Epping	0	2	0	0	0	1	0	2	1	6

Sheet C	1	2	3	4	5	6	7	8	Final
(Manitoba) Jeff Stoughton 🔨	0	0	0	1	0	1	0	X	2
(Ontario) Brad Jacobs	1	0	1	0	1	0	2	X	5

Sheet D	1	2	3	4	5	6	7	8	9	Final
(Alberta) Kevin Koe 🔨	0	1	0	2	0	1	0	1	1	6
(Norway) Thomas Ulsrud	0	0	2	0	2	0	1	0	0	5

Sheet E	1	2	3	4	5	6	7	8	Final
(Sweden) Niklas Edin	1	0	2	0	0	1	0	2	6
(Switzerland) Sven Michel 🔨	0	1	0	1	1	0	2	0	5

=== Draw 2 ===
Thursday, January 24, 9:00 am

Sheet A	1	2	3	4	5	6	7	8	Final
(British Columbia) Jim Cotter 🔨	0	0	0	0	0	0	2	0	2
(Switzerland) Peter de Cruz	1	0	0	1	2	0	0	1	5

Sheet B	1	2	3	4	5	6	7	8	Final
(Ontario) Mark Kean	0	0	0	1	1	1	0	X	3
(Manitoba) Mike McEwen 🔨	1	1	1	0	0	0	3	X	6

Sheet C	1	2	3	4	5	6	7	8	9	Final
(Alberta) Kevin Martin	1	0	3	0	1	0	3	0	2	10
(Norway) Thomas Ulsrud 🔨	0	2	0	3	0	1	0	2	0	8

Sheet D	1	2	3	4	5	6	7	8	Final
(Ontario) Rob Rumfeldt	1	0	1	0	0	0	0	X	2
(Saskatchewan) Steve Laycock 🔨	0	1	0	1	1	1	2	X	6

Sheet E	1	2	3	4	5	6	7	8	Final
(Ontario) Greg Balsdon	0	2	0	0	1	0	1	X	4
(Manitoba) Rob Fowler 🔨	2	0	2	0	0	2	0	X	6

=== Draw 3 ===
Thursday, January 24, 12:30 pm

Sheet A	1	2	3	4	5	6	7	8	Final
(Sweden) Niklas Edin	1	1	0	0	2	1	1	X	6
(Ontario) Greg Balsdon 🔨	0	0	0	1	0	0	0	X	1

Sheet B	1	2	3	4	5	6	7	8	Final
(Saskatchewan) Steve Laycock 🔨	2	0	0	1	0	1	0	0	4
(Newfoundland and Labrador) Brad Gushue	0	2	2	0	1	0	1	1	7

Sheet C	1	2	3	4	5	6	7	8	Final
(Ontario) Glenn Howard	0	1	0	1	0	2	0	X	4
(Switzerland) Sven Michel 🔨	1	0	2	0	2	0	3	X	8

Sheet D	1	2	3	4	5	6	7	8	Final
(Ontario) John Epping	0	0	3	0	0	X	X	X	3
(Manitoba) Rob Fowler 🔨	0	2	0	3	4	X	X	X	9

Sheet E	1	2	3	4	5	6	7	8	Final
(Alberta) Kevin Koe	0	0	1	0	0	3	0	3	7
(Ontario) Rob Rumfeldt 🔨	1	1	0	0	1	0	1	0	4

=== Draw 4 ===
Thursday, January 24, 4:00 pm

Sheet A	1	2	3	4	5	6	7	8	Final
(Switzerland) Sven Michel 🔨	1	0	0	0	1	0	0	5	7
(Ontario) John Epping	0	1	0	0	0	1	1	0	3

Sheet B	1	2	3	4	5	6	7	8	Final
(British Columbia) Jim Cotter	0	0	1	0	X	X	X	X	1
(Ontario) Brad Jacobs 🔨	4	1	0	4	X	X	X	X	9

Sheet C	1	2	3	4	5	6	7	8	Final
(Alberta) Kevin Koe 🔨	1	2	0	0	3	0	1	X	7
(Newfoundland and Labrador) Brad Gushue	0	0	2	1	0	0	0	X	3

Sheet D	1	2	3	4	5	6	7	8	Final
(Manitoba) Jeff Stoughton	0	0	2	0	0	X	X	X	2
(Manitoba) Mike McEwen 🔨	1	1	0	3	4	X	X	X	9

Sheet E	1	2	3	4	5	6	7	8	Final
(Ontario) Mark Kean 🔨	7	0	1	0	0	1	0	X	9
(Switzerland) Peter de Cruz	0	1	0	2	1	0	2	X	6

=== Draw 5 ===
Thursday, January 24, 8:00 pm

Sheet A	1	2	3	4	5	6	7	8	Final
(Manitoba) Jeff Stoughton 🔨	0	1	0	0	1	0	1	3	6
(Ontario) Mark Kean	0	0	0	1	0	1	0	0	2

Sheet B	1	2	3	4	5	6	7	8	Final
(Norway) Thomas Ulsrud 🔨	2	2	0	0	2	1	X	X	7
(Ontario) Rob Rumfeldt	0	0	1	0	0	0	X	X	1

Sheet C	1	2	3	4	5	6	7	8	Final
(Ontario) Brad Jacobs 🔨	0	0	1	0	1	0	X	X	2
(Manitoba) Mike McEwen	1	1	0	3	0	1	X	X	6

Sheet D	1	2	3	4	5	6	7	8	Final
(Ontario) Glenn Howard 🔨	1	0	2	1	0	0	3	X	7
(Sweden) Niklas Edin	0	2	0	0	0	2	0	X	4

Sheet E	1	2	3	4	5	6	7	8	Final
(Alberta) Kevin Martin	0	0	2	1	0	3	0	X	6
(Saskatchewan) Steve Laycock 🔨	1	1	0	0	1	0	1	X	4

=== Draw 6 ===
Friday, January 25, 9:00 am

Sheet A	1	2	3	4	5	6	7	8	Final
(Sweden) Niklas Edin	0	1	1	0	0	0	0	X	2
(Manitoba) Rob Fowler 🔨	1	0	0	0	2	3	1	X	7

Sheet B	1	2	3	4	5	6	7	8	Final
(British Columbia) Jim Cotter	0	3	0	2	0	2	X	X	7
(Manitoba) Mike McEwen 🔨	1	0	1	0	1	0	X	X	3

Sheet C	1	2	3	4	5	6	7	8	Final
(Ontario) John Epping 🔨	1	1	0	0	1	1	0	0	4
(Ontario) Greg Balsdon	0	0	3	0	0	0	3	1	7

Sheet D	1	2	3	4	5	6	7	8	Final
(Ontario) Brad Jacobs	0	1	0	1	1	1	0	1	5
(Switzerland) Peter de Cruz 🔨	1	0	1	0	0	0	2	0	4

Sheet E	1	2	3	4	5	6	7	8	Final
(Newfoundland and Labrador) Brad Gushue 🔨	2	0	0	2	0	1	0	1	6
(Ontario) Rob Rumfeldt	0	1	1	0	2	0	1	0	5

=== Draw 7 ===
Friday, January 25, 12:30 pm

Sheet A	1	2	3	4	5	6	7	8	Final
(Ontario) Glenn Howard 🔨	1	0	1	0	3	0	4	X	9
(Ontario) Greg Balsdon	0	2	0	1	0	1	0	X	4

Sheet B	1	2	3	4	5	6	7	8	Final
(Saskatchewan) Steve Laycock 🔨	2	0	0	2	0	0	2	X	6
(Norway) Thomas Ulsrud	0	1	1	0	1	0	0	X	3

Sheet C	1	2	3	4	5	6	7	8	Final
(Manitoba) Jeff Stoughton	2	0	0	2	0	0	1	X	5
(Switzerland) Peter de Cruz 🔨	0	0	1	0	1	0	0	X	2

Sheet D	1	2	3	4	5	6	7	8	Final
(British Columbia) Jim Cotter 🔨	4	0	0	2	0	1	X	X	7
(Ontario) Mark Kean	0	0	2	0	0	0	X	X	2

Sheet E	1	2	3	4	5	6	7	8	Final
(Switzerland) Sven Michel	0	1	2	0	0	1	X	X	4
(Manitoba) Rob Fowler 🔨	2	0	0	3	2	0	X	X	7

=== Draw 8 ===
Friday, January 25, 4:30 pm

Sheet A	1	2	3	4	5	6	7	8	Final
(Norway) Thomas Ulsrud	0	2	0	1	0	1	0	1	5
(Newfoundland and Labrador) Brad Gushue 🔨	2	0	2	0	1	0	2	0	7

Sheet B	1	2	3	4	5	6	7	8	9	Final
(Ontario) John Epping	0	0	1	2	0	0	2	0	0	5
(Sweden) Niklas Edin 🔨	1	1	0	0	1	1	0	1	1	6

Sheet C	1	2	3	4	5	6	7	8	Final
(Alberta) Kevin Koe	1	0	0	1	1	0	1	0	4
(Saskatchewan) Steve Laycock 🔨	0	2	0	0	0	2	0	1	5

Sheet D	1	2	3	4	5	6	7	8	Final
(Alberta) Kevin Martin 🔨	2	0	1	0	0	2	0	1	6
(Ontario) Rob Rumfeldt	0	0	0	2	1	0	1	0	4

Sheet E	1	2	3	4	5	6	7	8	Final
(Ontario) Brad Jacobs	0	0	2	1	0	1	0	X	4
(Ontario) Mark Kean 🔨	1	0	0	0	0	0	2	X	3

=== Draw 9 ===
Friday, January 25, 8:30 pm

Sheet A	1	2	3	4	5	6	7	8	Final
(Switzerland) Peter de Cruz 🔨	0	2	0	0	1	0	X	X	3
(Manitoba) Mike McEwen	2	0	1	2	0	4	X	X	9

Sheet B	1	2	3	4	5	6	7	8	Final
(Alberta) Kevin Koe 🔨	0	1	0	0	2	0	0	0	3
(Alberta) Kevin Martin	0	0	0	2	0	1	1	2	6

Sheet C	1	2	3	4	5	6	7	8	Final
(Ontario) Glenn Howard	0	0	1	0	1	0	X	X	2
(Manitoba) Rob Fowler 🔨	0	1	0	3	0	3	X	X	7

Sheet D	1	2	3	4	5	6	7	8	Final
(Switzerland) Sven Michel	0	2	0	2	0	1	1	0	6
(Ontario) Greg Balsdon 🔨	1	0	4	0	2	0	0	1	8

Sheet E	1	2	3	4	5	6	7	8	Final
(Manitoba) Jeff Stoughton 🔨	2	0	0	0	2	0	2	1	7
(British Columbia) Jim Cotter	0	2	0	0	0	2	0	0	4

== Tiebreaker ==
Saturday, January 26, 10:30 am

Team	1	2	3	4	5	6	7	8	Final
(Newfoundland and Labrador) Brad Gushue	0	0	1	0	1	0	1	3	6
(Saskatchewan) Steve Laycock 🔨	1	0	0	1	0	1	0	0	3

Player percentages
(Newfoundland and Labrador) Brad Gushue		(Saskatchewan) Steve Laycock	
Geoff Walker	94%	Dallan Muyres	88%
Adam Casey	86%	Colton Flasch	88%
Brett Gallant	71%	Kirk Muyres	91%
Brad Gushue	90%	Steve Laycock	74%
Total	86%	Total	85%

== Playoffs ==
The playoffs draw is listed as follows:

Quarterfinals
(Alberta) Kevin Martin	5
(Newfoundland and Labrador) Brad Gushue	4
(Manitoba) Mike McEwen	7
(Sweden) Niklas Edin	1
(Manitoba) Rob Fowler	3
(Alberta) Kevin Koe	4
(Ontario) Brad Jacobs	4
(Manitoba) Jeff Stoughton	6

Semifinals
(Alberta) Kevin Martin	4
(Manitoba) Mike McEwen	5
(Alberta) Kevin Koe	3
(Manitoba) Jeff Stoughton	5

Final
(Manitoba) Mike McEwen	2
(Manitoba) Jeff Stoughton	8

=== Quarterfinals ===
Saturday, January 26, 4:30 pm

Team	1	2	3	4	5	6	7	8	Final
(Alberta) Kevin Martin 🔨	0	1	0	0	2	1	0	1	5
(Newfoundland and Labrador) Brad Gushue	0	0	1	2	0	0	1	0	4

Player percentages
(Alberta) Kevin Martin		(Newfoundland and Labrador) Brad Gushue	
Ben Hebert	95%	Geoff Walker	88%
Marc Kennedy	96%	Adam Casey	93%
John Morris	93%	Brett Gallant	89%
Kevin Martin	84%	Brad Gushue	86%
Total	92%	Total	89%

Team	1	2	3	4	5	6	7	8	Final
(Manitoba) Mike McEwen 🔨	0	3	0	1	0	0	3	X	7
(Sweden) Niklas Edin	0	0	1	0	0	0	0	X	1

Player percentages
(Manitoba) Mike McEwen		(Sweden) Niklas Edin	
Denni Neufeld	76%	Viktor Kjäll	82%
Matt Wozniak	85%	Fredrik Lindberg	55%
B. J. Neufeld	87%	Sebastian Kraupp	78%
Mike McEwen	87%	Niklas Edin	81%
Total	84%	Total	74%

Team	1	2	3	4	5	6	7	8	Final
(Manitoba) Rob Fowler 🔨	1	0	1	0	0	0	0	1	3
(Alberta) Kevin Koe	0	1	0	0	1	1	1	0	4

Player percentages
(Manitoba) Rob Fowler		(Alberta) Kevin Koe	
Derek Samagalski	88%	Nolan Thiessen	85%
Richard Daneault	64%	Carter Rycroft	81%
Allan Lyburn	70%	Pat Simmons	90%
Rob Fowler	70%	Kevin Koe	84%
Total	73%	Total	85%

Team	1	2	3	4	5	6	7	8	Final
(Ontario) Brad Jacobs	0	0	2	1	0	0	1	0	4
(Manitoba) Jeff Stoughton 🔨	2	0	0	0	1	2	0	1	6

Player percentages
(Ontario) Brad Jacobs		(Manitoba) Jeff Stoughton	
Ryan Harnden	81%	Mark Nichols	89%
E.J. Harnden	90%	Reid Carruthers	85%
Ryan Fry	75%	Jon Mead	89%
Brad Jacobs	73%	Jeff Stoughton	88%
Total	80%	Total	88%

=== Semifinals ===
Saturday, January 26, 8:30 pm

Team	1	2	3	4	5	6	7	8	Final
(Alberta) Kevin Martin 🔨	1	0	0	1	0	1	1	0	4
(Manitoba) Mike McEwen	0	2	1	0	1	0	0	1	5

Player percentages
(Alberta) Kevin Martin		(Manitoba) Mike McEwen	
Ben Hebert	90%	Denni Neufeld	90%
Marc Kennedy	78%	Matt Wozniak	98%
John Morris	80%	B. J. Neufeld	86%
Kevin Martin	82%	Mike McEwen	90%
Total	82%	Total	91%

Team	1	2	3	4	5	6	7	8	Final
(Alberta) Kevin Koe	0	0	0	2	1	0	0	X	3
(Manitoba) Jeff Stoughton 🔨	0	0	3	0	0	0	2	X	5

Player percentages
(Alberta) Kevin Koe		(Manitoba) Jeff Stoughton	
Nolan Thiessen	87%	Mark Nichols	86%
Carter Rycroft	93%	Reid Carruthers	99%
Pat Simmons	84%	Jon Mead	77%
Kevin Koe	78%	Jeff Stoughton	94%
Total	86%	Total	86%

=== Final ===
Sunday, January 27, 2:30 pm

Team	1	2	3	4	5	6	7	8	Final
(Manitoba) Mike McEwen 🔨	1	0	0	1	0	0	X	X	2
(Manitoba) Jeff Stoughton	0	0	2	0	4	2	X	X	8

Player percentages
(Manitoba) Mike McEwen		(Manitoba) Jeff Stoughton	
Denni Neufeld	88%	Mark Nichols	90%
Matt Wozniak	86%	Reid Carruthers	91%
B. J. Neufeld	82%	Jon Mead	90%
Mike McEwen	54%	Jeff Stoughton	99%
Total	78%	Total	92%
