= 2015 Canadian Mixed Doubles Curling Trials =

- Host city: Ottawa, Ontario
- Arena: Ottawa Hunt and Golf Club
- Dates: March 11–15
- Winner: (Alberta) Thomas/Park
- Curling club: Glencoe CC, Calgary
- Female: Kalynn Park
- Male: Charley Thomas
- Finalist: (Ontario) Abbis-Mills/Bobbie

The 2015 Canadian Mixed Doubles Curling Trials were held from March 11 to 15 at the Ottawa Hunt and Golf Club in Ottawa, Ontario. The winning team of Charley Thomas and Kalynn Park will represent Canada at the 2015 World Mixed Doubles Curling Championship.

== Teams ==
Twelve teams qualified through provincial and territorial championships, and the rest will be participating as open entries. The teams are listed as follows:

=== Provincial and Territorial champions ===
Province / Territory	Male	Female	Club
Alberta	Matt Yeo	Brigitte Yeo	Avonair Curling Club
British Columbia	Tyler Tardi	Dezaray Hawes	Langley Curling Club; Royal City Curling Club
Manitoba	Ray Baker	Lisa Menard	Dauphin Curling Club
New Brunswick	Chris Jeffrey	Katie Forward	Capital Winter Club
Newfoundland and Labrador	Mark Flynn	Courtney Barnhill	St. John's Curling Club
Northern Ontario	Jordan Potts	Sarah Potts	Port Arthur Curling Club
Northwest Territories	Matthew Miller	Maureen Miller	Inuvik Curling Club
Nova Scotia	Tony Moore	Sheena Moore	Lakeshore Curling Club
Ontario	Brad Kidd	Casey Kidd	Peterborough Curling Club
Prince Edward Island	Kyle Holland	Katie Fullerton	Charlottetown Curling Complex; Cornwall Curling Club
Quebec	Michel Briand	Geneviève Frappier	Club de curling Longue Pointe
Saskatchewan	Shawn Joyce	Sherry Just	Nutana Curling Club
Yukon	Bob Smallwood	Jody Smallwood	Whitehorse Curling Club

=== Open entries ===
Province / Territory	Male	Female
Ontario	Glenn Howard	Carly Howard
Prince Edward Island; Nova Scotia	Adam Casey	Marie Christianson
Ontario	Patrick Janssen	Clancy Grandy
Ontario	Mark Kean	Mallory Kean
Ontario	David Mathers	Lynn Kreviazuk
Ontario; Quebec	Don Bowser	Lauren Mann
Ontario	Tyler Stewart	Nicole Westlund
Prince Edward Island; Yukon	Robbie Doherty	Patricia Wallingham
Manitoba	Daniel Grant	Kate Cameron
Ontario	Hugh Murphy	Janet Murphy
Ontario	Scott Brandon	Katelyn Wasylkiw
Ontario	Mike Anderson	Danielle Inglis
Saskatchewan	Dustin Kalthoff	Nancy Martin
Ontario	Bowie Abbis-Mills	Tess Bobbie
Ontario	Brett DeKoning	Robyn Murphy
Ontario	Scott McDonald	Caitlin Romain
Ontario	Wayne Tuck, Jr.	Kim Tuck
Alberta	Charley Thomas	Kalynn Park
Saskatchewan	Mike Armstrong	Ashley Quick

== Round-robin standings ==
Final round-robin standings

Key
Teams to Playoffs

Pool A	W	L
(Ontario) Abbis-Mills/Bobbie	7	0
(Ontario) Kidd/Kidd	5	2
(Ontario) Howard/Howard	5	2
(Ontario) DeKoning/Murphy	4	3
(Manitoba) Grant/Cameron	3	4
(Saskatchewan) Joyce/Just	2	5
(Nova Scotia) Moore/Moore	2	5
(Newfoundland and Labrador) Flynn/Barnhill	0	7

Pool B	W	L
(Alberta) Thomas/Park	6	1
(British Columbia) Tardi/Hawes	4	3
(Prince Edward Island) (Nova Scotia) Casey/Christiansen	4	3
(Ontario) MacDonald/Romain	4	3
(Ontario) (Quebec) Bowser/Mann	3	4
(Ontario) Tuck/Tuck	3	4
(Manitoba) Baker/Menard	2	5
(Quebec) Briand/Frappier	2	5

Pool C	W	L
(Ontario) Murphy/Murphy	5	2
(Ontario) Brandon/Wasylkiw	5	2
(Ontario) Janssen/Grandy	5	2
(New Brunswick) Jeffrey/Forward	4	3
(Northern Ontario) Potts/Potts	4	3
(Prince Edward Island) Holland/Fullerton	3	4
(Prince Edward Island) (Yukon) Doherty/Wallingham	1	6
(Northwest Territories) Miller/Miller	1	6

Pool D	W	L
(Ontario) Mathers/Kreviazuk	6	1
(Alberta) Yeo/Yeo	5	2
(Ontario) Kean/Kean	4	3
(Ontario) Stewart/Westlund	3	4
(Ontario) Anderson/Inglis	3	4
(Saskatchewan) Armstrong/Quick	3	4
(Saskatchewan) Kalthoff/Martin	3	4
(Yukon) Smallwood/Smallwood	1	6

== Playoffs ==
Round of 12
(British Columbia) Tardi/Hawes	4
(Ontario) Howard/Howard	8
(Ontario) Kidd/Kidd	7
(Prince Edward Island) (Nova Scotia) Casey/Christiansen	4
(Ontario) Brandon/Wasylkiw	4
(New Brunswick) Jeffrey/Forward	7
(Ontario) Janssen/Grandy	6
(Alberta) Yeo/Yeo	5

Quarterfinals
(Ontario) Howard/Howard	2
(Ontario) Abbis-Mills/Bobbie	7
(Ontario) Kidd/Kidd	5
(Ontario) Murphy/Murphy	6
(New Brunswick) Jeffrey/Forward	4
(Ontario) Mathers/Kreviazuk	7
(Ontario) Janssen/Grandy	7
(Alberta) Thomas/Park	9

Semifinals
(Ontario) Abbis-Mills/Bobbie	10
(Ontario) Murphy/Murphy	5
(Ontario) Mathers/Kreviazuk	2
(Alberta) Thomas/Park	7

Final
(Ontario) Abbis-Mills/Bobbie	3
(Alberta) Thomas/Park	8

=== Round of 12 ===
Saturday, March 14, 21:00

Team	1	2	3	4	5	6	7	8	Final
(British Columbia) Tardi/Hawes 🔨	1	0	0	0	0	2	1	0	4
(Ontario) Howard/Howard	0	1	2	1	3	0	0	1	8

Team	1	2	3	4	5	6	7	8	Final
(Ontario) Kidd/Kidd 🔨	1	0	2	1	0	1	0	2	7
(Prince Edward Island) (Nova Scotia) Casey/Christiansen	0	2	0	0	1	0	1	0	4

Team	1	2	3	4	5	6	7	8	Final
(Ontario) Brandon/Wasylkiw	0	1	1	0	1	0	0	1	4
(New Brunswick) Jeffrey/Forward 🔨	2	0	0	2	0	2	1	0	7

Team	1	2	3	4	5	6	7	8	Final
(Ontario) Janssen/Grandy	1	0	0	0	4	1	0	X	6
(Alberta) Yeo/Yeo 🔨	0	1	1	2	0	0	1	X	5

=== Quarterfinals ===
Sunday, March 15, 09:30

Team	1	2	3	4	5	6	7	8	Final
(Ontario) Howard/Howard 🔨	0	0	1	0	1	0	0	0	2
(Ontario) Abbis-Mills/Bobbie	1	1	0	1	0	1	2	1	7

Team	1	2	3	4	5	6	7	8	Final
(Ontario) Kidd/Kidd	0	1	0	0	2	0	1	1	5
(Ontario) Murphy/Murphy 🔨	2	0	1	2	0	1	0	0	6

Team	1	2	3	4	5	6	7	8	Final
(New Brunswick) Jeffrey/Forward	0	1	0	1	0	1	1	0	4
(Ontario) Mathers/Kreviazuk 🔨	1	0	1	0	2	0	0	3	7

Team	1	2	3	4	5	6	7	8	Final
(Ontario) Janssen/Grandy	0	2	0	0	2	1	2	0	7
(Alberta) Thomas/Park 🔨	1	0	4	1	0	0	0	3	9

=== Semifinals ===
Sunday, March 15, 13:30

Team	1	2	3	4	5	6	7	8	Final
(Ontario) Abbis-Mills/Bobbie 🔨	2	0	4	2	0	2	0	X	10
(Ontario) Murphy/Murphy	0	2	0	0	2	0	1	X	5

Team	1	2	3	4	5	6	7	8	Final
(Ontario) Mathers/Kreviazuk 🔨	0	0	1	0	1	0	0	X	2
(Alberta) Thomas/Park	1	1	0	2	0	2	1	X	7

=== Final ===
Sunday, March 15, 17:30

Team	1	2	3	4	5	6	7	8	Final
(Ontario) Abbis-Mills/Bobbie 🔨	0	1	0	0	0	2	0	X	3
(Alberta) Thomas/Park	2	0	2	1	1	0	2	X	8
