= 2014 Canadian Mixed Doubles Curling Trials =

Championship

- Host city: Ottawa, Ontario
- Arena: Ottawa Hunt and Golf Club
- Dates: March 19–23
- Winner: (Ontario) Tuck/Tuck
- Curling club: Ilderton CC, Ilderton
- Female: Kim Tuck
- Male: Wayne Tuck Jr.
- Finalist: (Alberta) Thomas/Park

The 2014 Canadian Mixed Doubles Curling Trials was held from March 19 to 23 at the Ottawa Hunt and Golf Club in Ottawa, Ontario. It is the second Canadian Mixed Doubles championship. The winning pair of Wayne Tuck Jr. and wife Kim Tuck represented Canada at the 2014 World Mixed Doubles Curling Championship.

== Teams ==
Twelve teams qualified through provincial and territorial championships, and the rest participated as open entries. The teams are listed as follows:

=== Provincial and Territorial champions ===
Province / Territory	Male	Female	Club
Yukon	Bob Smallwood	Jody Smallwood	Whitehorse Curling Club
Northwest Territories	Nick Kaeser	Brittany Brasser	Fort Smith Curling Club
British Columbia	Bryan Kedziora	Colleen Hannah	Golden Ears Winter Club
Alberta	Corey Leach	Karli Makichuk	Leduc Curling Club; Lac La Biche Curling Club
Saskatchewan	Kirk Pederson	Trenna Derdall	Outlook Curling Club
Manitoba	Kyle Kurz	Karen Fallis	Wildewood Curling Club
Northern Ontario	Eric Gélinas	Courtney Chénier	North Bay Granite Club
Ontario	Chris Jay	Shannon Kee	Highland Country Club
Quebec	Daniel Grégoire	Caroline Boily	Club de curling Longue-Pointe
New Brunswick	Ryan Freeze	Leah Thompson	Capital Winter Club; Thistle St. Andrews Curling Club
Nova Scotia	Travis Colter	Julia Williams	Dartmouth Curling Club; CFB Halifax Curling Club
Newfoundland and Labrador	Cory Ewart	Lauren Wasylkiw	St. John's Curling Club; Bally Haly Golf & Curling Club

=== Open entries ===
Province / Territory	Male	Female
Ontario; Manitoba	Connor Lawes	Kaitlyn Lawes
Newfoundland and Labrador	Adam Casey	Marie Christianson
Ontario	Patrick Janssen	Clancy Grandy
Alberta; Nova Scotia	John Morris	Heather Smith
Ontario	Mark Kean	Mallory Buist
Ontario	Travis Fanset	Rachelle Vink
Ontario	Scott Howard	Tess Bobbie
Alberta	Charley Thomas	Kalynn Park
Saskatchewan; Manitoba	Josh Heidt	Jenna Loder
Ontario	Wayne Tuck Jr.	Kim Tuck
Ontario	Jay Allen	Jacqueline Harrison
Ontario	Connor Duhaime	Chantal Lalonde
Saskatchewan	Jason Ackerman	Colleen Ackerman
Saskatchewan	Mike Armstrong	Ashley Quick
Quebec	Robert Desjardins	Brittany O'Rourke
Saskatchewan	Dustin Kalthoff	Nancy Martin
Quebec	Miguel Bernard	Camille Lapierre
Yukon; Alberta	Mitch Young	Jocelyn Peterman
Nova Scotia	Tom Sullivan	Mary-Anne Arsenault
British Columbia; Yukon	Cameron de Jong	Andrea Sinclair

== Round robin standings ==
Final Round Robin Standings

Key
Teams to Playoffs

Pool A	W	L
(Alberta) Park/Thomas	7	0
(Saskatchewan) Kalthoff/Martin	5	2
(Manitoba) (Saskatchewan) Loder/Heidt	4	3
(Manitoba) (Ontario) Lawes/Lawes	4	3
(Ontario) Gélinas/Chénier	3	4
(Quebec) Desjardins/O'Rourke	2	5
(Yukon) (British Columbia) Sinclair/De Jong	2	5
(New Brunswick) Freeze/Thompson	1	6

Pool B	W	L
(Saskatchewan) Armstrong/Quick	7	0
(Ontario) Howard/Bobbie	6	1
(Newfoundland and Labrador) Casey/Christiansen	5	2
(British Columbia) Hannah/Kedziora	3	4
(Newfoundland and Labrador) Ewart/Wasylkiw	3	4
(Yukon) Smallwood/Smallwood	2	5
(Alberta) Makichuk/Leach	1	6
(Nova Scotia) Sullivan/Arsenault	1	6

Pool C	W	L
(Ontario) Tuck/Tuck	6	1
(Saskatchewan) Ackerman/Ackerman	5	2
(Ontario) Fanset/Vink	5	2
(Ontario) Janssen/Grandy	4	3
(Yukon) (Alberta) Young/Peterman	4	3
(Saskatchewan) Pederson/Derdall	2	5
(Quebec) Boily/Grégoire	2	5
(Northwest Territories) Kaeser/Brasser	0	7

Pool D	W	L
(Nova Scotia) (Alberta) Smith/Morris	7	0
(Ontario) Jay/Kee	5	2
(Ontario) Kean/Buist	5	2
(Manitoba) Kurz/Fallis	4	3
(Quebec) Lapierre/Bernard	4	3
(Ontario) Harrison/Allen	1	6
(Ontario) Lalonde/Duhaime	1	6
(Nova Scotia) Colter/Williams	1	6

== Playoffs ==
Round of 12
(Saskatchewan) Ackerman/Ackerman	2
(Newfoundland and Labrador) Casey/Christianson	9
(Ontario) Howard/Bobbie	9
(Ontario) Janssen/Grandy	8
(Saskatchewan) Kalthoff/Martin	10
(Ontario) Fanset/Vink	2
(Ontario) Jay/Kee	6
(Ontario) Kean/Buist	7

Quarterfinals
(Newfoundland and Labrador) Casey/Christianson	6
(Alberta) (Nova Scotia) Morris/Smith	9
(Ontario) Howard/Bobbie	4
(Ontario) Tuck/Tuck	9
(Saskatchewan) Kalthoff/Martin	2
(Alberta) Thomas/Park	9
(Ontario) Kean/Buist	5
(Saskatchewan) Armstrong/Quick	7

Semifinals
(Alberta) (Nova Scotia) Morris/Smith	8
(Ontario) Tuck/Tuck	10
(Alberta) Thomas/Park	8
(Saskatchewan) Armstrong/Quick	7

Final
(Ontario) Tuck/Tuck	8
(Alberta) Thomas/Park	5

=== Round of 12 ===
Saturday, March 22, 9:30 pm

Team	1	2	3	4	5	6	7	8	Final
(Saskatchewan) Ackerman/Ackerman	0	0	1	1	0	X	X	X	2
(Newfoundland and Labrador) Casey/Christianson	4	1	0	0	4	X	X	X	9

Team	1	2	3	4	5	6	7	8	Final
(Ontario) Howard/Bobbie	1	0	4	0	1	0	3	0	9
(Ontario) Janssen/Grandy	0	2	0	1	0	3	0	2	8

Team	1	2	3	4	5	6	7	8	Final
(Saskatchewan) Kalthoff/Martin	3	1	0	1	0	0	5	X	10
(Ontario) Fanset/Vink	0	0	1	0	0	1	0	X	2

Team	1	2	3	4	5	6	7	8	Final
(Ontario) Jay/Kee	1	0	1	0	2	1	0	1	6
(Ontario) Kean/Buist	0	4	0	1	0	0	2	0	7

=== Quarterfinals ===
Sunday, March 23, 11:00 am

Team	1	2	3	4	5	6	7	8	Final
(Newfoundland and Labrador) Casey/Christianson	0	0	0	1	1	0	4	0	6
(Alberta) (Nova Scotia) Morris/Smith	1	1	1	0	0	5	0	1	9

Team	1	2	3	4	5	6	7	8	Final
(Ontario) Howard/Bobbie	2	1	0	1	0	0	0	X	4
(Ontario) Tuck/Tuck	0	0	1	0	3	3	2	X	9

Team	1	2	3	4	5	6	7	8	Final
(Saskatchewan) Kalthoff/Martin	0	1	0	0	0	1	X	X	2
(Alberta) Thomas/Park	4	0	2	2	1	0	X	X	9

Team	1	2	3	4	5	6	7	8	Final
(Ontario) Kean/Buist	2	0	0	0	0	2	1	0	5
(Saskatchewan) Armstrong/Quick	0	2	1	1	1	0	0	2	7

=== Semifinals ===
Sunday, March 23, 2:00 pm

Team	1	2	3	4	5	6	7	8	Final
(Alberta) (Nova Scotia) Morris/Smith	3	0	2	0	1	0	2	0	8
(Ontario) Tuck/Tuck	0	1	0	4	0	3	0	2	10

Team	1	2	3	4	5	6	7	8	Final
(Alberta) Thomas/Park	2	0	1	0	4	0	0	1	8
(Saskatchewan) Armstrong/Quick	0	1	0	2	0	2	2	0	7

=== Final ===
Sunday, March 23, 5:00 pm

Team	1	2	3	4	5	6	7	8	Final
(Ontario) Tuck/Tuck	2	0	0	4	1	0	1	0	8
(Alberta) Thomas/Park	0	2	1	0	0	1	0	1	5
