= Patrick Janssen =

Canadian curler

- Curler
- Born: May 12, 1987 (age 39); Scarborough, Ontario, Canada

Team
- Curling club: Oshawa G&CC; Oshawa, ON
- Skip: Scott Howard
- Third: David Mathers
- Second: Patrick Janssen
- Lead: Scott Chadwick

Curling career
- Member Association: Ontario (2009–2019; 2022–present); Alberta (2020–2022)
- Brier: 4 (2018, 2020, 2021, 2022)
- Top CTRS ranking: 5th (2015–16 & 2016–17)
- Grand Slam victories: 1 (2015 Canadian Open)
Medal record
Men's Curling
Representing Canada
Tim Hortons Brier
Bronze medal – third place	2022 Lethbridge
Representing Ontario
Tim Hortons Brier
Bronze medal – third place	2018 Regina
Representing Alberta
Tim Hortons Brier
Gold medal – first place	2021 Calgary
Silver medal – second place	2020 Kingston

Patrick "Pat" Janssen (born May 12, 1987) is a Canadian curler from Burlington, Ontario. He currently plays second on Team Scott Howard.

== Career ==
=== Youth ===
Janssen skipped the University of Toronto men's curling team at the 2010 CIS/CCA Curling Championships, finishing with a 4–3 record. In 2005 he won the provincial schoolboy championship playing for his high school, Sir Oliver Mowat Collegiate Institute.

=== Men's ===
Janssen joined the Mark Kean rink in 2010, playing second on the team. In 2011, the team played in their first Grand Slam event, the January 2011 Canadian Open. The team finished the event with an 0–5 record. Also that season, the team made it to their first provincial championship, the 2011 Dominion Tankard. There, the team finished with a 6–4 record, missing the playoffs.

In the 2011–12 season, the Kean rink played in two slams, the 2011 World Cup of Curling (0-5 record) and the December 2011 Canadian Open (1-4 record). The team played in the 2012 Dominion Tankard, missing the playoffs with a 3–7 record.

In the 2012–13 season, the Team Kean had a better season on Tour, winning the 2012 KW Fall Classic and playing in four slams. They played in the 2012 Masters of Curling (0-5 record), the 2012 Canadian Open of Curling (semifinalists), the 2013 National (1-4 record) and the 2013 Players' Championship (0-4). The team did not qualify for the men's provincial championship that season.

The rink played in the 2013 Canadian Olympic Curling Pre-Trials, finishing with a 1–3 record, and not qualifying for the Olympic Trials. They then played in the 2013 Canadian Open of Curling, losing in the quarterfinals. The team disbanded mid-season, but Janssen would play in two more Slams that year, playing second for Travis Fanset at the March 2014 National going 0-5 and playing second for John Epping at the 2014 Players' Championship, losing in the quarterfinals.

The next season, Janssen remained on the Epping rink. Early on in the season, they won the 2014 Village of Taunton Mills Gord Carroll Curling Classic. They played in five slams that season, making it to the semifinals of the 2014 Masters and 2015 Players' Championship, while missing the playoffs at the November 2014 National, the 2014 Canadian Open of Curling and the 2015 Elite 10. The team played in the 2015 Ontario Tankard (men's provincials), making it to the final before losing to Janssen's former skip, Mark Kean.

In the 2015–16 season, Team Epping would play in seven Grand Slam events, winning the 2015 Meridian Canadian Open, the team's first Slam title. In the other slams, the team made lost in the finals of the 2016 Humpty's Champions Cup, made it to the semifinals of the 2015 National, the quarterfinals of the 2016 Elite 10, while the team missed the playoffs at the 2015 GSOC Tour Challenge, 2015 Masters of Curling, 2016 Players' Championship. The team also played in the 2015 Canada Cup of Curling, where they made it to the semifinal. At the 2016 Ontario Tankard, the team again made it to the finals, but lost to Team Glenn Howard in the final. That season, the team also won the 2016 US Open of Curling.

In the 2016–17 season, the Epping rink again played in all seven slams, making it to the semifinals of the 2017 Humpty's Champions Cup, the quarterfinals of the 2016 WFG Masters and the 2016 Boost National, and missed the playoffs at the 2016 GSOC Tour Challenge, 2017 Meridian Canadian Open, the 2017 Elite 10 and the 2017 Players' Championship. Elsewhere on the tour, the team won the 2016 CookstownCash presented by Comco Canada Inc. and the 2016 Challenge de Curling de Gatineau. At the 2016 Canada Cup of Curling, the team again lost in the semifinal. At the 2017 Ontario Tankard, the team lost in the semifinal against Wayne Tuck Jr.

The team played in the 2017 Canadian Olympic Curling Trials, but missed the playoffs. The team would win the 2018 Ontario Tankard, the first provincial championship for the team. They represented Ontario at the 2018 Tim Hortons Brier, where Epping led them to a bronze medal, after losing in the semifinal to Alberta, skipped by Brendan Bottcher.

For the 2018–19 season, Janssen joined the team skipped by Charley Thomas as second, with Adam Casey as third and Fraser Reid as lead.

Janssen spared for Karrick Martin on Team Bottcher at the 2019 Karuizawa International where the team finished 4th. He also spared for Bottcher and represented Alberta at the 2020 Tim Hortons Brier in his home province of Kingston, Ontario where the team won a silver medal. He returned to the 2021 Brier, again as the alternate on Team Bottcher, where they finished second in their pool during round-robin play, with a 6–2 record. In the championship pool they improved their record to 9–3, earning the third seed in the playoffs where they defeated Matt Dunstone's Team Saskatchewan in the semifinals to make it to their fourth Brier finals in a row. Team Bottcher defeated four-time Brier champion Kevin Koe in the finals, with a score of 4–2, to win their first Brier championship.

=== Mixed doubles ===
In mixed doubles play, Janssen and partner Clancy Grandy played in the 2014 Canadian Mixed Doubles Curling Trials, losing in the round of 12, and at the 2015 Canadian Mixed Doubles Curling Trials, losing in the quarterfinals.

== Personal life ==
Janssen works as an engineering manager with DPW Logistics. He is married to Becky Collins, and has one child. While a student at the University of Toronto, he studied industrial engineering. He was formerly married to fellow curler Clancy Grandy.
