= 2017 Elite 10 =

Grand Slam of Curling event

- Host city: Port Hawkesbury, Nova Scotia
- Arena: Port Hawkesbury Civic Centre
- Dates: March 17–20
- Winner: (British Columbia) John Morris
- Curling club: Vernon CC, Vernon & Kelowna CC, Kelowna
- Skip: John Morris
- Third: Jim Cotter
- Second: Tyrel Griffith
- Lead: Rick Sawatsky
- Finalist: (Ontario) Brad Jacobs

The 2017 Princess Auto Elite 10 was held from March 16 to 20 at Port Hawkesbury Civic Centre in Port Hawkesbury, Nova Scotia. It was the fifth Grand Slam of Curling event held in the 2016–17 curling season. The tournament was held between ten men's teams.

It was won by John Morris.

== Teams ==
| Skip | Third | Second | Lead | Locale |
|---|---|---|---|---|
| Reid Carruthers | Braeden Moskowy | Derek Samagalski | Colin Hodgson | Winnipeg, Manitoba |
| Benoît Schwarz (Fourth) | Claudio Pätz | Peter de Cruz (Skip) | Valentin Tanner | Geneva, Switzerland |
| Niklas Edin | Oskar Eriksson | Rasmus Wranå | Christoffer Sundgren | Karlstad, Sweden |
| John Epping | Mat Camm | Pat Janssen | Tim March | Toronto, Ontario |
| Brad Gushue | Mark Nichols | Brett Gallant | Tom Sallows | St. John's, Newfoundland and Labrador |
| Brad Jacobs | Ryan Fry | E. J. Harnden | Ryan Harnden | Sault Ste. Marie, Ontario |
| Kevin Koe | Marc Kennedy | Brent Laing | Scott Pfeifer | Calgary, Alberta |
| Steve Laycock | Kirk Muyres | Matt Dunstone | Dallan Muyres | Saskatoon, Saskatchewan |
| Jim Cotter (Fourth) | John Morris (Skip) | Tyrel Griffith | Rick Sawatsky | Kelowna / Vernon, British Columbia |
| Jeff Stoughton | David Nedohin | Nolan Thiessen | Jamie Korab | Manitoba Alberta Texas Newfoundland and Labrador (Elite 10 Select) |

== Round robin standings ==
Final Round Robin Standings

| Pool A | W | EEW | EEL | L | EF | EA | Pts |
|---|---|---|---|---|---|---|---|
| (Ontario) Brad Jacobs | 3 | 0 | 1 | 0 | 12 | 6 | 10 |
| (Switzerland) Peter de Cruz | 1 | 2 | 0 | 1 | 14 | 12 | 7 |
| (Alberta) Kevin Koe | 2 | 0 | 1 | 1 | 12 | 8 | 7 |
| (Sweden) Niklas Edin | 1 | 0 | 0 | 3 | 7 | 11 | 3 |
| (Ontario) John Epping | 1 | 0 | 0 | 3 | 6 | 14 | 3 |

| Pool B | W | EEW | EEL | L | EF | EA | Pts |
|---|---|---|---|---|---|---|---|
| (British Columbia) John Morris | 3 | 0 | 0 | 1 | 14 | 5 | 9 |
| (Manitoba) Jeff Stoughton | 3 | 0 | 0 | 1 | 13 | 11 | 9 |
| (Manitoba) Reid Carruthers | 1 | 1 | 1 | 1 | 10 | 12 | 6 |
| (Newfoundland and Labrador) Brad Gushue | 1 | 1 | 0 | 2 | 11 | 13 | 5 |
| (Saskatchewan) Steve Laycock | 0 | 0 | 1 | 3 | 7 | 14 | 1 |

== Round robin results ==
All draw times are listed in Atlantic Standard Time (UTC−8).

=== Draw 1 ===
Thursday, March 16, 12:00 pm

| Sheet A | 1 | 2 | 3 | 4 | 5 | 6 | 7 | 8 | 9 | Final |
| (Manitoba) Reid Carruthers | ✓ | | ✓ | | ✓ | | | | | 3 |
| (Newfoundland and Labrador) Brad Gushue 🔨 | | ✓ | | ✓ | | ✓ | | | ✓ | 4 |

| Sheet B | 1 | 2 | 3 | 4 | 5 | 6 | 7 | 8 | 9 | Final |
| (Switzerland) Peter de Cruz | ✓ | | ✓ | | | ✓ | ✓ | | ✓ | 5 |
| (Alberta) Kevin Koe 🔨 | | ✓ | | ✓ | ✓ | | | ✓ | | 4 |

| Sheet C | 1 | 2 | 3 | 4 | 5 | 6 | 7 | 8 | Final |
| (Sweden) Niklas Edin 🔨 | | ✓ | ✓ | ✓ | | ✓ | X | X | 4 |
| (Ontario) John Epping | | | | | ✓ | | X | X | 1 |

=== Draw 2 ===
Thursday, March 16, 4:00 pm

| Sheet A | 1 | 2 | 3 | 4 | 5 | 6 | 7 | 8 | Final |
| (Manitoba) Jeff Stoughton | | | ✓ | | ✓ | | ✓ | | 3 |
| (Saskatchewan) Steve Laycock 🔨 | | | | ✓ | | ✓ | | | 2 |

| Sheet B | 1 | 2 | 3 | 4 | 5 | 6 | 7 | 8 | Final |
| (Sweden) Niklas Edin | | | | ✓ | ✓ | | | | 2 |
| (Ontario) Brad Jacobs 🔨 | | | ✓ | | | ✓ | | ✓ | 3 |

| Sheet C | 1 | 2 | 3 | 4 | 5 | 6 | 7 | 8 | Final |
| (Manitoba) Reid Carruthers | | | | | | | X | X | 0 |
| (British Columbia) John Morris 🔨 | ✓ | ✓ | ✓ | | | ✓ | X | X | 4 |

=== Draw 3 ===
Thursday, March 16, 7:30 pm

| Sheet A | 1 | 2 | 3 | 4 | 5 | 6 | 7 | 8 | Final |
| (Ontario) John Epping | | ✓ | | | ✓ | ✓ | ✓ | X | 4 |
| (Switzerland) Peter de Cruz 🔨 | ✓ | | ✓ | | | | | X | 2 |

| Sheet B | 1 | 2 | 3 | 4 | 5 | 6 | 7 | 8 | Final |
| (Manitoba) Jeff Stoughton 🔨 | | ✓ | ✓ | | | ✓ | | ✓ | 4 |
| (Newfoundland and Labrador) Brad Gushue | ✓ | | | | ✓ | | ✓ | | 3 |

| Sheet C | 1 | 2 | 3 | 4 | 5 | 6 | 7 | 8 | Final |
| (Alberta) Kevin Koe | | | | | | | | X | 0 |
| (Ontario) Brad Jacobs 🔨 | ✓ | | ✓ | | | | | X | 2 |

=== Draw 4 ===
Friday, March 17, 10:00 am

| Sheet A | 1 | 2 | 3 | 4 | 5 | 6 | 7 | 8 | Final |
| (British Columbia) John Morris | ✓ | | ✓ | ✓ | ✓ | X | X | X | 4 |
| (Newfoundland and Labrador) Brad Gushue 🔨 | | | | | | X | X | X | 0 |

| Sheet B | 1 | 2 | 3 | 4 | 5 | 6 | 7 | 8 | 9 | Final |
| (Manitoba) Reid Carruthers 🔨 | | | | | | ✓ | ✓ | | ✓ | 3 |
| (Saskatchewan) Steve Laycock | | | ✓ | | ✓ | | | | | 2 |

| Sheet C | 1 | 2 | 3 | 4 | 5 | 6 | 7 | 8 | Final |
| (Switzerland) Peter de Cruz | | | ✓ | | ✓ | ✓ | | X | 3 |
| (Sweden) Niklas Edin 🔨 | ✓ | | | | | | | X | 1 |

=== Draw 5 ===
Friday, March 17, 1:00 pm

| Sheet A | 1 | 2 | 3 | 4 | 5 | 6 | 7 | 8 | Final |
| (Ontario) Brad Jacobs 🔨 | | | | ✓ | ✓ | | ✓ | | 3 |
| (Switzerland) Peter de Cruz | ✓ | ✓ | ✓ | | | | | ✓ | 4 |

| Sheet B | 1 | 2 | 3 | 4 | 5 | 6 | 7 | 8 | Final |
| (Ontario) John Epping | | ✓ | | | | | | X | 1 |
| (Alberta) Kevin Koe 🔨 | | | ✓ | ✓ | | ✓ | ✓ | X | 4 |

| Sheet C | 1 | 2 | 3 | 4 | 5 | 6 | 7 | 8 | Final |
| (Manitoba) Jeff Stoughton | ✓ | | ✓ | | ✓ | | ✓ | X | 4 |
| (British Columbia) John Morris 🔨 | | ✓ | | ✓ | | | | X | 2 |

=== Draw 6 ===
Friday, March 17, 4:30 pm

| Sheet A | 1 | 2 | 3 | 4 | 5 | 6 | 7 | 8 | Final |
| (Alberta) Kevin Koe 🔨 | ✓ | ✓ | ✓ | ✓ | | X | X | X | 4 |
| (Sweden) Niklas Edin | | | | | | X | X | X | 0 |

| Sheet B | 1 | 2 | 3 | 4 | 5 | 6 | 7 | 8 | Final |
| (Saskatchewan) Steve Laycock | | ✓ | | | | | ✓ | | 2 |
| (Newfoundland and Labrador) Brad Gushue 🔨 | ✓ | | | ✓ | | ✓ | | ✓ | 4 |

=== Draw 7 ===
Friday, March 17, 8:00 pm

| Sheet A | 1 | 2 | 3 | 4 | 5 | 6 | 7 | 8 | Final |
| (Manitoba) Reid Carruthers 🔨 | | | ✓ | | | ✓ | ✓ | ✓ | 4 |
| (Manitoba) Jeff Stoughton | ✓ | | | ✓ | | | | | 2 |

| Sheet B | 1 | 2 | 3 | 4 | 5 | 6 | 7 | 8 | Final |
| (Saskatchewan) Steve Laycock | | ✓ | | | | X | X | X | 1 |
| (British Columbia) John Morris 🔨 | ✓ | | ✓ | ✓ | ✓ | X | X | X | 4 |

| Sheet B | 1 | 2 | 3 | 4 | 5 | 6 | 7 | 8 | Final |
| (Ontario) John Epping 🔨 | | | | | | | X | X | 0 |
| (Ontario) Brad Jacobs | ✓ | ✓ | ✓ | | | ✓ | X | X | 4 |

== Playoffs ==
Quarterfinals
(Switzerland) Peter de Cruz | 1
(Alberta) Kevin Koe | 2
(Manitoba) Jeff Stoughton | 0
(Manitoba) Reid Carruthers | 2

Semifinals
(Alberta) Kevin Koe | 1
(Ontario) Brad Jacobs | 4
(Manitoba) Reid Carruthers | 1
(British Columbia) John Morris | 5

Final
(Ontario) Brad Jacobs | 2
(British Columbia) John Morris | 3

=== Quarterfinals ===
Saturday, March 18, 1:00 pm

| Team | 1 | 2 | 3 | 4 | 5 | 6 | 7 | 8 | 9 | Final |
| (Alberta) Kevin Koe | | | | ✓ | | | | | ✓ | 2 |
| (Switzerland) Peter de Cruz 🔨 | | | | | | | ✓ | | | 1 |

Player percentages
| (Alberta) Team Koe | | (Switzerland) Team de Cruz | |
|---|---|---|---|
| Scott Pfeifer | 94% | Valentin Tanner | 92% |
| Brent Laing | 88% | Peter de Cruz | 93% |
| Marc Kennedy | 92% | Claudio Pätz | 92% |
| Kevin Koe | 86% | Benoit Schwarz | 83% |
| Total | 90% | Total | 90% |

| Team | 1 | 2 | 3 | 4 | 5 | 6 | 7 | 8 | Final |
| (Manitoba) Jeff Stoughton | | | | | | | | X | 0 |
| (Manitoba) Reid Carruthers 🔨 | | | ✓ | | ✓ | | | X | 2 |

Player percentages
| (Manitoba) Team Stoughton | | (Manitoba) Team Carruthers | |
|---|---|---|---|
| Jamie Korab | 86% | Colin Hodgson | 78% |
| Nolan Thiessen | 95% | Derek Samagalski | 78% |
| David Nedohin | 82% | Braeden Moskowy | 77% |
| Jeff Stoughton | 92% | Reid Carruthers | 94% |
| Total | 89% | Total | 81% |

=== Semifinals ===
Saturday, March 18, 5:00 pm

| Team | 1 | 2 | 3 | 4 | 5 | 6 | 7 | 8 | Final |
| (Alberta) Kevin Koe | ✓ | | | | | | X | X | 1 |
| (Ontario) Brad Jacobs 🔨 | | ✓ | | ✓ | ✓ | ✓ | X | X | 4 |

Player percentages
| (Alberta) Team Koe | | (Ontario) Team Jacobs | |
|---|---|---|---|
| Scott Pfeifer | 86% | Ryan Harnden | 97% |
| Brent Laing | 69% | E.J. Harnden | 90% |
| Marc Kennedy | 100% | Ryan Fry | 75% |
| Kevin Koe | 44% | Brad Jacobs | 79% |
| Total | 75% | Total | 85% |

| Team | 1 | 2 | 3 | 4 | 5 | 6 | 7 | 8 | Final |
| (Manitoba) Reid Carruthers | | | ✓ | | | | X | X | 1 |
| (British Columbia) John Morris 🔨 | ✓ | ✓ | | ✓ | ✓ | ✓ | X | X | 5 |

Player percentages
| (Manitoba) Team Carruthers | | (British Columbia) Team Morris | |
|---|---|---|---|
| Colin Hodgson | 84% | Rick Sawatsky | 90% |
| Derek Samagalski | 87% | Tyrel Griffith | 68% |
| Braeden Moskowy | 95% | John Morris | 91% |
| Reid Carruthers | 54% | Jim Cotter | 87% |
| Total | 80% | Total | 84% |

=== Final ===
Sunday, March 19, 11:00 am

| Team | 1 | 2 | 3 | 4 | 5 | 6 | 7 | 8 | Final |
| (Ontario) Brad Jacobs 🔨 | | ✓ | | | ✓ | | | | 2 |
| (British Columbia) John Morris | ✓ | | | ✓ | | | | ✓ | 3 |

Player percentages
| (Ontario) Team Jacobs | | (British Columbia) Team Morris | |
|---|---|---|---|
| Ryan Harnden | 86% | Rick Sawatsky | 86% |
| E.J. Harnden | 87% | Tyrel Griffith | 69% |
| Ryan Fry | 92% | John Morris | 90% |
| Brad Jacobs | 72% | Jim Cotter | 95% |
| Total | 84% | Total | 85% |
