= Charley Thomas =

Canadian curler

- Curler
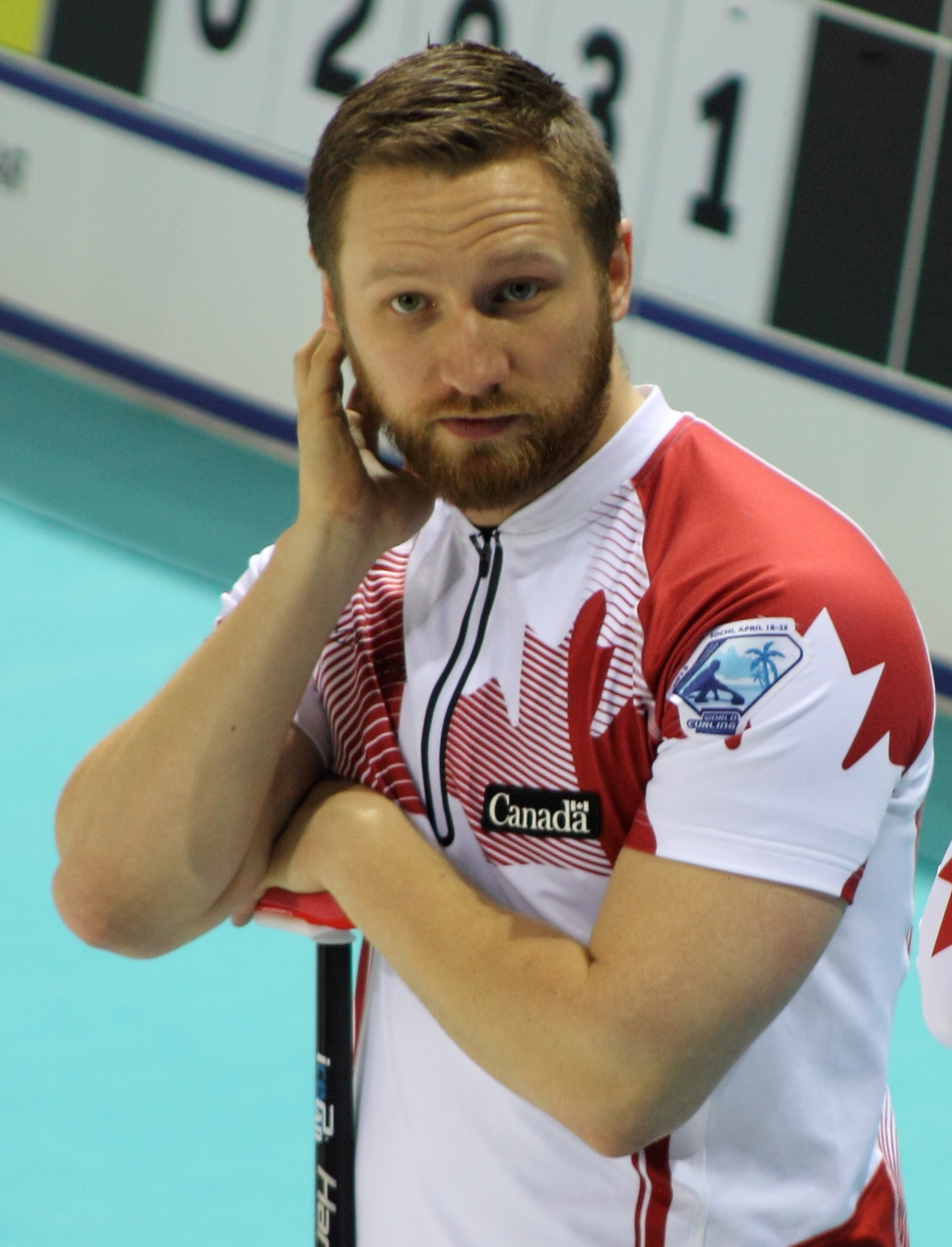
- Born: April 4, 1986 (age 40); Victoria, British Columbia

Team
- Curling club: Langenburg CC, Langenburg, SK
- Skip: Charley Thomas
- Third: Tyler Hartung
- Second: Jayden Shwaga
- Lead: Matthew Lang

Curling career
- Member Association: Alberta (2003–2018); Ontario (2018–2019); Saskatchewan (since 2024)
- World Mixed Doubles Championship: 1 (2015)
- Top CTRS ranking: 9th (2015–16)
Medal record
Men's curling
Representing Canada
World Junior Championships
Gold medal – first place	2006 Jeonju
Gold medal – first place	2007 Eveleth
Representing Alberta
Canadian Mixed Doubles Trials
Gold medal – first place	2015 Ottawa
Silver medal – second place	2014 Ottawa

Charley M. Thomas (born April 4, 1986) is a Canadian curler from Calgary who currently skips his own rink on the World Curling Tour.

== Curling career ==
Thomas started his career with an Alberta Provincial Junior title in 2004 and made his debut on the national and international curling scene representing Alberta and winning the 2006 Canadian Junior Curling Championships (Thunder Bay, Ontario) and 2006 World Junior Curling Championships (Jeonju, Korea). Thomas and team also qualified for the 2007 Canadian Junior Curling Championships by winning the 2007 Alberta Junior Provincials at the Granite Curling Club in Edmonton, Alberta. He went on to win his second straight Canadian Junior title over Brett Gallant's rink from Prince Edward Island, as well as a consecutive World Junior title by defeating Niklas Edin of Sweden.

After juniors, Thomas skipped his own team before teaming up with Chris Schille in 2008, throwing fourth stones for the team. Thomas played one season with Schille. Thomas returned to skipping between 2010 and 2014, and joined the Virtue rink for the 2014–15 season.

Thomas and teammate Kalynn Park won the 2015 Canadian Mixed Doubles Curling Trials and represented Canada at the 2015 World Mixed Doubles Curling Championship to a 4th-place finish.

Thomas returned as a skip for the 2015–16 curling season, playing in two Grand Slam of Curling events that season and four more in the 2016–17 curling season (including playing third on Brad Gushue's team in one event, as Gushue was out due to a hip injury.

== Personal life ==
Thomas was born in Victoria, British Columbia.

Thomas was a student at the University of Calgary in 2017.

== Awards ==
- Canadian Junior Men First Team All-star skip: 2006
- Canadian Junior Men First Team All-star skip: 2007

== Grand Slam record ==
Key
C	Champion
F	Lost in Final
SF	Lost in Semifinal
QF	Lost in Quarterfinals
R16	Lost in the round of 16
Q	Did not advance to playoffs
T2	Played in Tier 2 event
DNP	Did not participate in event
N/A	Not a Grand Slam event that season

Event	2007–08	2008–09	2009–10	2010–11	2011–12	2012–13	2013–14	2014–15	2015–16	2016–17	2017–18	2018–19
Elite 10	N/A	N/A	N/A	N/A	N/A	N/A	N/A	DNP	Q	DNP	DNP	DNP
Masters / World Cup	DNP	DNP	DNP	DNP	DNP	DNP	DNP	DNP	DNP	QF (Note: Subbing for Team Gushue for injured Brad Gushue)	DNP	DNP
Tour Challenge	N/A	N/A	N/A	N/A	N/A	N/A	N/A	N/A	DNP	Q	T2	T2
The National	Q	DNP	DNP	DNP	DNP	DNP	DNP	DNP	DNP	QF	DNP	DNP
Canadian Open	DNP	DNP	DNP	DNP	DNP	DNP	DNP	DNP	DNP	Q	DNP	
Players'	DNP	DNP	DNP	DNP	DNP	DNP	DNP	DNP	Q	DNP	DNP	
