= Kalynn Park =

Canadian curler and coach

- Curler
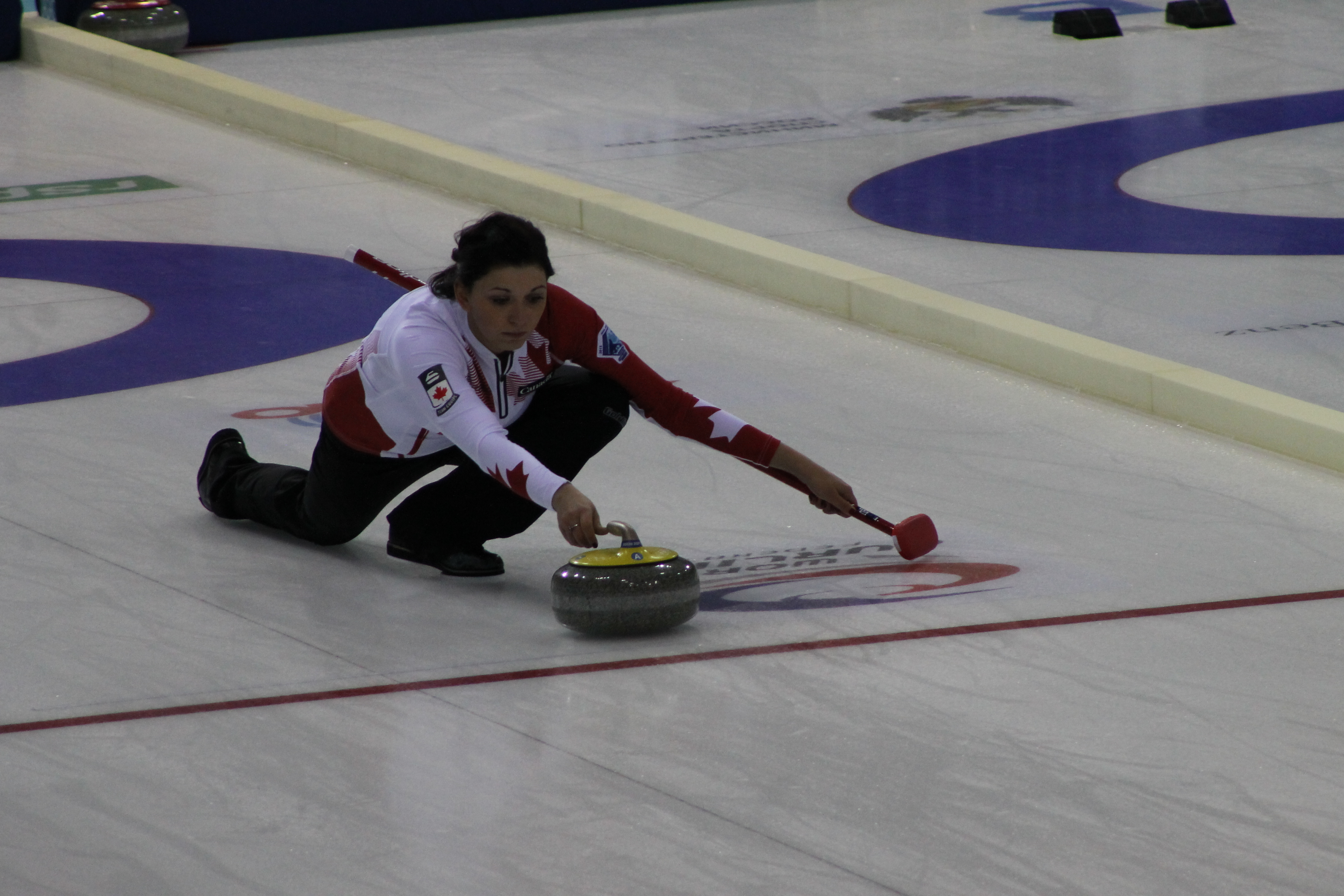
- Other names: Kalynn Virtue
- Born: September 12, 1988 (age 38); Edmonton, Alberta, Canada

Team
- Curling club: Glencoe CC, Calgary, AB

Curling career
- World Mixed Doubles Championship: 1 (2015)
Medal record
Curling
Representing Alberta
Canadian Mixed Doubles Trials
Gold medal – first place	2015 Ottawa
Silver medal – second place	2014 Ottawa

Kalynn Park (born September 12, 1988) is a Canadian curler and curling coach. She is right-handed.

She and Charley Thomas won the 2015 Canadian Mixed Doubles Curling Trials and represented Canada at the 2015 World Mixed Doubles Curling Championship.

== Achievements ==
- Canadian Mixed Doubles Curling Championship: gold (2015), silver (2014).
- Canadian Junior Curling Championships: bronze (2009).

== Teams and events ==
=== Women's ===
Season	Skip	Third	Second	Lead	Alternate	Coach	Events
2005–06	Kalynn Park	Megan Anderson	Jessie Kaufman	Joanne Taylor			
2006–07	Kalynn Park	Cary-Anne Sallows	Jessie Kaufman	Joanne Taylor		Heather Moore	CJCC 2007 (5th)
2008–09	Casey Scheidegger	Kalynn Park	Jessie Scheidegger	Jayme Coutts		Don Scheidegger	CJCC 2009 (bronze)
2009	Kaitlyn Lawes	Jenna Loder	Laryssa Grenkow	Breanne Meakin	Kalynn Park	Rob Meakin	WJCC 2009 (silver)
2009–10	Casey Scheidegger (fourth)	Kalynn Park	Diane Foster (skip)	Rachelle Pidherny			
2010–11	Desiree Owen	Kalynn Park	Cary-Anne McTaggart	Stephanie Malekoff			
2011–12	Casey Scheidegger	Kalynn Park	Jessie Scheidegger	Joelle Horn			
2012–13	Shannon Kleibrink	Bronwen Webster	Kalynn Park	Chelsey Matson			
2013–14	Shannon Kleibrink	Bronwen Webster	Kalynn Park	Chelsey Matson			
2014–15	Teryn Hamilton	Kalynn Park	Sandi Weber	Alanna Blackwell			
2015–16	Kalynn Park	Shana Snell	Amanda Craigie	Kaitlin Stubbs			
2016–17	Kalynn Virtue	Shana Snell	Amanda Craigie	Kaitlin Stubbs			
2017–18	Shannon Kleibrink	Sarah Wilkes	Kalynn Park	Alison Thiessen			
2018–19	Kristen Streifel	Kelly Schafer	Kalynn Park	Dayna Demers			
2019–20	Kristen Streifel	Kelly Schafer	Kalynn Park	Dayna Demers			

=== Mixed ===
Season	Skip	Third	Second	Lead	Events
2008–09	Tom Appelman	Kalynn Park	Branden Klassen	Rachelle Pidherny	CMxCC 2009 (10th)

=== Mixed doubles ===
Season	Male	Female	Coach	Events
2013–14	Charley Thomas	Kalynn Park		CMDCT 2014 (silver)
2014–15	Charley Thomas	Kalynn Park	Jim Waite (WMDCC)	CMDCT 2015 (gold); WMDCC 2015 (4th)
2015–16	Charley Thomas	Kalynn Park		CMDCT 2016 (5th)
2016–17	Charley Thomas	Kalynn Virtue		CMDCT 2017 (9th)
2017–18	Charley Thomas	Kalynn Park		CMDCOT 2018 (11th); CMDCC 2018 (5th)
2018–19	Kalynn Park	John Morris	Nolan Thiessen	CWC 2018–19 (2nd leg) (5th)

== Coaching (national teams) ==
Year	Event	Team	Place
2015–16	2016 World Mixed Doubles Curling Championship	Spain (mixed doubles)	23

== Personal life ==
Park is a graduate of the University of Alberta and Athabasca University. She works as a Paralegal. She is the daughter of curler Kevin Park and was married to Brock Virtue.
