= Port Hawkesbury Civic Centre =

Multi-purpose arena in Port Hawkesbury, Nova Scotia

- Interactive map of Port Hawkesbury Civic Centre
- Location: 606 Reeves Street, Port Hawkesbury, Nova Scotia
- Coordinates: 45.6166°N 61.3546°W
- Capacity: Hockey: 1000; Banquets: 1700; Concerts: 2000

Construction
- Opened: November 25, 2004
- Architect: Bob Ojolick

Tenants
- SAREC Saints (2004-Present); Strait Pirates (2004-Present)

The Port Hawkesbury Civic Centre is a multi-purpose arena located in Port Hawkesbury, Nova Scotia.

In 2007, Business Week Online named the Civic Centre as one of the top ten most impressive sports arenas in the world.

== Design ==
The Port Hawksbury Civic Centre was designed by architect Bob Ojolick of Ojolick Associates Architects/Planners. The arena was built with being green and effort in mind, as it is one of the few ice hockey rinks in the world that allows for natural light from the outside.

== Notable events ==
- 2005 - Don Johnson Memorial Cup
- 2005 - The National - Grand Slam of Curling
- 2007 - The National - Grand Slam of Curling
- 2009 - Florida Panthers training camp
- 2010 - Montreal Canadiens alumni game
- 2013 - The National - Grand Slam of Curling
- 2014 - Don Johnson Memorial Cup
- 2014 - The Stanfields
- 2014 - World U-17 Hockey Challenge
- 2015 - Matt Minglewood & Sam Moon
- 2017 - 2017 Elite 10 - Grand Slam of Curling
