= 2012–13 Ontario Curling Tour =

The 2012–13 curling season began at the end of August 2012 and ended in April 2013.

== Ontario Curling Tour ==
World Curling Tour events in bold

=== Men's events ===
| Week | Event | Winning skip | Runner-up skip |
|---|---|---|---|
| 1 | Fort Wayne Summer Cash; Fort Wayne, Indiana, Aug. 17 – 19 | (Ontario) Scott McDonald | (Massachusetts) Korey Dropkin |
| 4 | OCT Championships; Oakville, Ontario Sept. 6-9 | (Ontario) Brad Jacobs | (Ontario) Mark Kean |
| 5 | **AMJ Campbell Shorty Jenkins Classic**; Brockville, Ontario, Sept. 13–16 | (Ontario) John Epping | (Manitoba) Jeff Stoughton |
| 6 | Moosehead Fall Open; Ottawa, Ontario, Sept. 19–23 | (Ontario) Ian MacAulay | (Ontario) Colin Dow |
| 6 | KW Fall Classic; Waterloo, Ontario Sept. 20–23 | (Ontario) Mark Kean | (Ontario) Greg Balsdon |
| 7 | Ingersoll Clash; Ingersoll, Ontario, Sept. 28 – 30 | (Ontario) Terry Corbin | (Ontario) Brett Dekoning |
| 8 | Mac Ice Classic; Ottawa, Ontario, Oct. 3–8 | (Ontario) Ian MacAulay | (Ontario) Trevor Bonot |
| 8 | **StuSells Toronto Tankard**; Toronto, Ontario, Oct. 5–8 | (Manitoba) Jeff Stoughton | (Ontario) Joe Frans |
| 9 | Stroud Sleeman Cash Spiel; Stroud, Ontario, Oct. 11–14 | (Ontario) Joe Frans | (Ontario) Greg Balsdon |
| 9 | **St. Paul Cash Spiel**; St. Paul, Minnesota, Oct. 12–14 | (Minnesota) John Shuster | (Minnesota) Todd Birr |
| 11 | **Challenge Chateau Cartier de Gatineau**; Buckingham, Quebec, Oct. 25–28 | (Nova Scotia) Mark Dacey | (Newfoundland and Labrador) Brad Gushue |
| 11 | Huron ReproGraphics Oil Heritage Classic; Sarnia, Ontario, Oct. 26–28 | (Ontario) Rob Rumfeldt | (New York (state)) Heath McCormick |
| 12 | Mount Lawn Gord Carroll Classic; Whitby, Ontario, Nov. 1–5 | (Ontario) Glenn Howard | (Ontario) Mark Kean |
| 12 | CookstownCash presented by Comco Canada Inc. Cookstown, Ontario, Nov. 2-4 | (Ontario) Pat Ferris | (Ontario) Dennis Moretto |
| 12 | Elora Cash Spiel; Elora, Ontario, Nov. 2-4 | (Ontario) Nick Rizzo | (Ontario) Mike Bryson |
| 13 | Port Elgin Superspiel; Port Elgin, Ontario, Nov. 9–11 | (Ontario) Len Rominger | (Ontario) Al Hutchinson |
| 13 | Arctic Snowplows Classic; St. Thomas, Ontario, Nov. 9–11 | (Ontario) Bowie Abbis-Mills | (Ontario) Bruce Park |
| 13 | **Courtesy Freight Northern Ontario Superspiel**; Thunder Bay, Ontario, Nov. 9–11 | (Ontario) Al Hackner | (Ontario) Craig Kochan |
| 13 | North Key Construction Men's Open; Napanee, Ontario, Nov. 9–11 | (Ontario) Dayna Deruelle | (Ontario) Jonathan Beuk |
| 14 | **Rogers Masters of Curling**; Brantford, Ontario, Nov. 14–18 | (Alberta) Kevin Koe | (British Columbia) Jim Cotter |
| 14 | COMCO Cash Spiel; Stroud, Ontario, Nov. 15–18 | (Ontario) Pat Ferris | (Ontario) Darryl Prebble |
| 14 | Ottawa Tankard Tune-Up; Ottawa, Ontario, Nov. 16–18 | (Ontario) Ian MacAulay | (Ontario) Shane Latimer |
| 15 | TD Canada Trust Scugog Cup; Port Perry, Ontario, Nov. 23–25 | (Ontario) Connor Duhaime | (Ontario) Bryan Cochrane |
| 15 | Chatham Granite Cash Spiel; Chatham, Ontario, Nov. 23–25 | (Ontario) Bowie Abbis-Mills | (Ontario) Dale Kelly |
| 15 | **Coors Light Cash Spiel**; Duluth, Minnesota, Nov. 23–25 | (Ontario) Bryan Burgess | (Minnesota) John Shuster |
| 15 | Co-operators Cup; Markdale, Ontario, Nov. 23–25 | (Ontario) Al Hutchinson | (Ontario) Dion Dumontelle |
| 16 | Brantford Nissan Classic; Brantford, Ontario, Nov. 29– Dec. 2 | (Ontario) Joe Frans | (Ontario) Bowie Abbis-Mills |
| 16 | **Madison Cash Spiel**; Madison, Wisconsin, Nov. 30 – Dec. 2 | (Minnesota) John Shuster | (Minnesota) Pete Fenson |
| 18 | **Curl Mesabi Cash Spiel**; Eveleth, Minnesota, Dec. 14–16 | (Minnesota) Tyler George | (Minnesota) Todd Birr |
| 21 | The Dominion Tankard - Region 1 Carleton Place, Ontario, Jan. 5–6 | A: Bryan Cochrane | B: Howard Rajala |
| 21 | The Dominion Tankard - Region 2 Toronto, Ontario, Jan. 5–6 | A: John Epping | B: Darryl Prebble |
| 21 | The Dominion Tankard - Region 3 Elmira, Ontario, Jan. 5–6 | A: Robert Rumfeldt | B: Dayna Deruelle |
| 21 | The Dominion Tankard - Region 4 Glencoe, Ontario, Jan. 5–6 | A: Wayne Tuck, Jr. | B: Pat Ferris |
| 26 | The Dominion Tankard; Barrie, Ontario, Feb. 4–10 | (Ontario) Glenn Howard | (Ontario) Joe Frans |
| 30 | Harriston Cash Spiel; Harriston, Ontario, March 9–10 | (Ontario) Joe Frans | (Ontario) Pat Ferris |

=== Women's events ===
| Week | Event | Winning skip | Runner-up skip |
|---|---|---|---|
| 1 | Fort Wayne Summer Cash; Fort Wayne, Indiana, Aug. 17 – 19 | (Ontario) Scott McDonald | (Massachusetts) Korey Dropkin |
| 4 | OCT Championships; Oakville, Ontario Sept. 6-9 | (Wisconsin) Erika Brown | (Ontario) Sherry Middaugh |
| 4 | Carleton Heights Women's Cash; Ottawa, Ontario Sept. 6-9 | (Ontario) Lauren Horton | (Ontario) Katie Morrissey |
| 5 | **AMJ Campbell Shorty Jenkins Classic**; Brockville, Ontario, Sept. 13–16 | (Ontario) Tracy Horgan | (Scotland) Eve Muirhead |
| 6 | Moosehead Fall Open; Ottawa, Ontario, Sept. 19–23 | (Ontario) Rachel Homan | (Ontario) Lauren Mann |
| 6 | KW Fall Classic; Waterloo, Ontario Sept. 20–23 | (Wisconsin) Erika Brown | (Ontario) Kristy Russell |
| 7 | Ingersoll Clash; Ingersoll, Ontario, Sept. 29 – 30 | (Ontario) Chantal Lalonde | (Ontario) Susan McKnight |
| 8 | Mac Ice Classic; Ottawa, Ontario, Oct. 3–8 | (Quebec) Marie-France Larouche | (Ontario) Lauren Horton |
| 8 | StuSells Toronto Tankard; Toronto, Ontario, Oct. 5–8 | (Nova Scotia) Mary-Anne Arsenault | (Ontario) Lisa Farnell |
| 9 | Stroud Sleeman Cash Spiel; Stroud, Ontario, Oct. 11–14 | (Ontario) Julie Hastings | (Ontario) Shawnessy Johnson |
| 9 | **St. Paul Cash Spiel**; St. Paul, Minnesota, Oct. 12–14 | (New York (state)) Patti Lank | (Minnesota) Margie Smith |
| 11 | **Challenge Chateau Cartier de Gatineau**; Buckingham, Quebec, Oct. 25–28 | (Ontario) Julie Reddick | (Ontario) Cathy Auld |
| 12 | Mount Lawn Gord Carroll Classic; Whitby, Ontario, Nov. 1–5 | (Ontario) Jill Mouzar | (Ontario) Jacqueline Harrison |
| 12 | **Royal LePage OVCA Women's Fall Classic**; Kemptville, Ontario, Nov. 1-4 | (Ontario) Rachel Homan | (Ontario) Allison Nimik |
| 12 | Elora Cash Spiel; Elora, Ontario, Nov. 2-4 | (Ontario) Kristy Russell | (Ontario) Kendra Lilly |
| 13 | Guelph Women's Cashspiel; Guelph, Ontario, Nov. 9–11 | (Ontario) Julie Reddick | (Ontario) Susan McKnight |
| 13 | **Courtesy Freight Northern Ontario Superspiel**; Thunder Bay, Ontario, Nov. 9–11 | (Ontario) Krista McCarville | (Ontario) Ashley Kallos |
| 14 | **Rogers Masters of Curling**; Brantford, Ontario, Nov. 14–18 | (Ontario) Rachel Homan | (Manitoba) Chelsea Carey |
| 14 | Ottawa Tankard Tune-Up; Ottawa, Ontario, Nov. 16–18 | (Ontario) Jaimee Gardner | (Quebec) Allison Ross |
| 15 | Chatham Granite Cash Spiel; Chatham, Ontario, Nov. 23–25 | (Ontario) Michelle Fletcher | (Ontario) Jordan Ariss |
| 15 | **Molson Cash Spiel**; Duluth, Minnesota, Nov. 23–25 | (Ontario) Krista McCarville | (Wisconsin) Becca Hamilton |
| 16 | **Madison Cash Spiel**; Madison, Wisconsin, Nov. 30 – Dec. 2 | (Wisconsin) Erika Brown | (Ontario) Jill Mouzar |
| 18 | **Curl Mesabi Cash Spiel**; Eveleth, Minnesota, Dec. 14–16 | (Alberta) Jessie Kaufman | (Minnesota) Allison Pottinger |
| 24 | Ontario Scotties Tournament of Hearts; Kitchener, Ontario, Jan. 21–27 | (Ontario) Rachel Homan | (Ontario) Cathy Auld |

== OCT Money List ==
Men

as of Week 13
| # | Locale | Skip | $ (CAD) |
|---|---|---|---|
| 1 | Winnipeg, Manitoba | Jeff Stoughton | 22,400 |
| 2 | (Ontario) Toronto | Mark Kean | 19,700 |
| 3 | (Ontario) Sault Ste. Marie | Brad Jacobs | 16,350 |
| 4 | (Ontario) Bradford | Joe Frans | 13,300 |
| 5 | (Ontario) Toronto | Greg Balsdon | 12,800 |
| 6 | (Ontario) Ottawa | Ian MacAulay | 12,500 |
| 7 | (Ontario) Toronto | John Epping | 11,900 |
| 8 | (Ontario) Ottawa | Bryan Cochrane | 10,800 |
| 9 | (Ontario) Guelph | Rob Rumfeldt | 10,785 |
| 10 | Halifax, Nova Scotia | Mark Dacey | 10,000 |

Women

as of Week 12
| # | Locale | Skip | $ (CAD) |
|---|---|---|---|
| 1 | (United States) Madison, Wisconsin | Erika Brown | 8,889 |
| 2 | (Ontario) Ottawa | Rachel Homan | 7,700 |
| 3 | (Ontario) Listowel | Allison Nimik | 7,500 |
| 4 | (Ontario) Toronto | Jill Mouzar | 7,050 |
| 5 | (Ontario) Elgin | Lisa Farnell | 6,400 |
| 6 | (Ontario) Sudbury | Tracy Horgan | 6,300 |
| 7 | (Ontario) Coldwater | Sherry Middaugh | 6,000 |
| 7 | (Nova Scotia) Halifax | Mary-Anne Arsenault | 6,000 |
| 9 | Levis, Quebec | Marie-France Larouche | 5,900 |
| 10 | (Ontario) Thornhill | Julie Hastings | 5,700 |

== See also ==
- Ontario Curling Tour Home
- World Curling Tour Home
- Season of Champions Home
- Curling Champions Tour Home
- International bonspiel calendar
