= Clifton Thompson =

Clifton Thompson may refer to:

- Clifton L. Thompson (1825–1900), American merchant and politician in Virginia
- G. Clifton Thompson (1913–2008), president of the International Curling Federation
