= 2013 Fort Wayne Summer Cash Spiel =

World Curling Tour event

- Host city: Fort Wayne, Indiana
- Arena: Lutheran Health Sportscenter
- Dates: August 16–18
- Men's winner: (Ohio) Matt Paul
- Skip: Matt Paul
- Third: Michael Moore
- Second: Mark Lazar
- Lead: Jordan Wesler
- Finalist: (Ontario) Mike Aprile
- Women's winner: (China) Wang Bingyu
- Curling club: Harbin CC, Harbin
- Skip: Wang Bingyu
- Third: Liu Yin
- Second: Yue Qingshuang
- Lead: Zhou Yan
- Finalist: (China) Jiang Yilun

The 2013 Fort Wayne Summer Cash Spiel was held from August 16 to 18 at the Lutheran Health Sportscenter in Fort Wayne, Indiana. The women's event was held as part of the 2013–14 World Curling Tour, while both the men's and women's events were held as part of the 2013–14 Ontario Curling Tour. The men's event was being held in a triple-knockout format, while the women's event was being held in a round robin format. The purse for the men's event was US$3,000, while the purse for the women's event was US$6,000.

== Men ==
=== Teams ===
The teams are listed as follows:

Skip	Third	Second	Lead	Locale
Mike Aprile	Katie Pringle	Shawn Cottrill	Graeme Robson	Listowel, Ontario
Peter Bialek	Adam Jacobson	Dan Naylor	Daniel Cho	Wayland, Massachusetts
Greg Eigner	Jeremy Roe	Richard Maskel	Mark Hartman	Fort Wayne, Indiana
Brett Jackson	Rich Romano	Pete McCormick	Paul Arsenault	Detroit, Michigan
Sean Murray	David Bykowski	Rob Corn	Mike Barry	Madison, Wisconsin
Matt Paul	Michael Moore	Mark Lazar	Jordan Wesler	Cleveland, Ohio
Erik Sheets	Kyle Conroy	Jared Coughlin	Nick Rudd	Villanova, Pennsylvania

=== Knockout results ===
==== A Event ====
First Knockout		Semifinals		Qualifier 1
		(Ontario) Mike Aprile	0
(Wisconsin) Sean Murray	7	(Wisconsin) Sean Murray	8
(Massachusetts) Peter Bialek	2			(Wisconsin) Sean Murray	3
(Indiana) Greg Eigner	6			(Ohio) Matt Paul	5
(Michigan) Brett Jackson	2	(Indiana) Greg Eigner	6
(Ohio) Matt Paul	11	(Ohio) Matt Paul	7
(Pennsylvania) Erik Sheets	3

==== B Event ====
Second Knockout
(Michigan) Brett Jackson	6
(Pennsylvania) Erik Sheets	8

Quarterfinals
(Indiana) Greg Eigner	13
(Massachusetts) Peter Bialek	1
(Ontario) Mike Aprile	6
(Pennsylvania) Erik Sheets	1

Semifinals
(Indiana) Greg Eigner	8
(Ontario) Mike Aprile	3

Qualifier 2
(Indiana) Greg Eigner	7
(Wisconsin) Sean Murray	8

==== C Event ====
Qualifier 3
1	(Ontario) Mike Aprile	10
2	(Pennsylvania) Erik Sheets	6

Third Knockout		Qualifier 4
		(Indiana) Greg Eigner	10
(Massachusetts) Peter Bialek	6	(Michigan) Brett Jackson	3
(Michigan) Brett Jackson	7

=== Playoffs ===
Semifinals
1	(Ohio) Matt Paul	5
4	(Indiana) Greg Eigner	3
3	(Wisconsin) Sean Murray	6
2	(Ontario) Mike Aprile	8

Final
(Ohio) Matt Paul	5
(Ontario) Mike Aprile	4

== Women ==
=== Teams ===
The teams are listed as follows:

Skip	Third	Second	Lead	Locale
Sarah Anderson	Kathleen Dubberstein	Taylor Anderson	Leilani Dubberstein	Pennsylvania
Erika Brown	Debbie McCormick	Jessica Schultz	Ann Swisshelm	Madison, Wisconsin
Alex Carlson	Kimberly Wapola	Emily Juocys		St. Paul, Minnesota
Cory Christensen	Rebecca Funk	Anna Bauman	Sonja Bauman	Duluth, Minnesota
Courtney George	Aileen Sormunen	Amanda McLean	Monica Walker	St. Paul, Minnesota
Jenna Haag	Erin Wallace	Grace Gabower	Brittany Falk	Janesville, Wisconsin
Jiang Yilun	Wang Rui	Yaoi Mingyue	She Qiutong	Harbin, China
Eve Muirhead	Anna Sloan	Vicki Adams	Claire Hamilton	Stirling, Scotland
Cassie Potter	Jamie Haskell	Jackie Lemke	Steph Sambor	St. Paul, Minnesota
Allison Pottinger	Nicole Joraanstad	Natalie Nicholson	Tabitha Peterson	Bemidji, Minnesota
Jennifer Spencer	Jaimee Gardner	Amanda Gebhardt	Becky Philpott	Guelph, Ontario
Wang Bingyu	Liu Yin	Yue Qingshuang	Zhou Yan	Harbin, China

=== Round robin standings ===
Final round robin standings

Key
Teams to playoffs

Pool A	W	L
(China) Jiang Yilun	4	1
(Scotland) Eve Muirhead	3	2
(Minnesota) Allison Pottinger	3	2
(Minnesota) Courtney George	3	2
(Wisconsin) Jenna Haag	1	4
(Pennsylvania) Sarah Anderson	1	4

Pool B	W	L
(China) Wang Bingyu	5	0
(Wisconsin) Erika Brown	4	1
(Minnesota) Alex Carlson	2	3
(Minnesota) Cassie Potter	2	3
(Minnesota) Cory Christensen	1	4
(Ontario) Jennifer Spencer	1	4

=== Playoffs ===
Quarterfinals
(Scotland) Eve Muirhead	5
(Minnesota) Allison Pottinger	3
(Wisconsin) Erika Brown	4
(Minnesota) Courtney George	5

Semifinals
(China) Wang Bingyu	8
(Scotland) Eve Muirhead	6
(China) Jiang Yilun	9
(Minnesota) Courtney George	3

Final
(China) Wang Bingyu	6
(China) Jiang Yilun	5
