= List of teams on the 2012–13 Ontario Curling Tour =

This is a list of teams on the 2012–13 Ontario Curling Tour

== Men ==
As of October 18, 2012

Skip	Third	Second	Lead	Alternate	Locale
Bowie Abbis-Mills	Craig Van Ymeren	Ed Cyr	Geoff Chambers		Aylmer, Ontario
Brian Adams, Jr.	Michael Makela	Andy Peloza	Phil Kennedy		Thunder Bay, Ontario
Mike Anderson	Chris Van Huyse	Matt Sheppard	Sean Harrison		Markham, Ontario
Mike Aprile	Scott McGregor	Scott Hindle	Shawn Cottrill		Listowel, Ontario
Bob Armstrong	Curtis Cassidy	David Heinrichs	Darryl Nodwell		Ingersoll, Ontario
Mike Assad	Ben Mikkelsen	Jordan Potts	Mike Davis		Thunder Bay, Ontario
Alexander Attinger	Felix Attinger	Daniel Schifferli	Simon Attinger		Switzerland
Sean Aune	Ian Dickie	Tyler Stewart	Graham Carr		Toronto, Ontario
Randy Baird		Chase Schmitt	Josh Bahr		Bemidji, Minnesota
Scott Ballantyne	Derek Morrison	Scott Nicholson	Trevor Raynsford		Tara, Ontario
Greg Balsdon	Mark Bice	Tyler Morgan	Jamie Farnell	Steve Bice	Toronto, Ontario
Kent Beadle	Randy Cumming	Vince Bernet	John Ustice		St. Paul, Minnesota
John Bell	Greg Nelson	Jeff Parsons	Mike McCormick		Unionville, Ontario
Ryan Berg	Al Gulseth	Mark Gulseth	Jordan Brown		West Fargo, North Dakota
Ben Bevan	Tyler Sagan	Carter Adair	Derreck Veitch		Ajax, Ontario
Todd Birr	Doug Pottinger	Tom O'Connor	Kevin Birr		Mankato, Minnesota
Trevor Bonot	Allen Macsemchuk	Chris Briand	Tim Jewett		Thunder Bay, Ontario
Don Bowser	Jonathan Beuk	Matt Broder	TJ Connolly		Ottawa, Ontario
Adam Gagné (fourth)	Doug Brewer	Trevor Brewer (skip)	Chris Gannon		Brockville, Ontario
Craig Brown	Kroy Nernberger	Matt Hamilton	Derrick Casper		Madison, Wisconsin
Scott Brown	Evan Workin	Parker Shook	Spencer Tuskowski	Ryan Westby	Fargo, North Dakota
Kurtis Bryd	Isaac Keffer	Josh Szajewski	Mike Zsakai		Thunder Bay, Ontario
Mike Bryson	Wesley Forget	Danny Dow	Scott Chadwick		Toronto, Ontario
Bryan Burgess	Mike Pozihun	Dale Weirsema	Pat Berezoski		Thunder Bay, Ontario
Terry Bushell	Scott Garton	Jeff Robson	Andrew Bushell		Ingersoll, Ontario
Barry Campbell	Sean Bryant	Jess Bechard	Brad Hertner		Brantford, Ontario
Don Campbell	Kent Cheesman	John Stanley	Rick Dafoe		Orillia, Ontario
Pierre Charette	Richard Faguy	Louis Biron	Maurice Cayouette		Buckingham, Quebec
Clavin Christiansen	Gord Schade	Iain Wilson	Chris DeHaan		Ottawa, Ontario
Brady Clark	Sean Beighton	Darren Lehto	Steve Lundeen		(Washington (state)) Seattle, Washington
Chris Gardner (fourth)	Mathew Camm	Brad Kidd	Bryan Cochrane (skip)		Ottawa, Ontario
Dave Collyer	Evan Sullivan	Bill Leitch	Peter Aker		Belleville, Ontario
Spencer Cooper	Willie Jeffries	Brian Vance	Steve Forrest		Ottawa, Ontario
Al Corbeil	Wyllie Allan	Sean Flaherty	Tom Cunningham		Barrie, Ontario
Brandon Corbett	Derek Corbett				(New York (state)) Rochester, New York
Terry Corbin	Dave Pallen	Dave Ellis	Ted Anderson		Toronto, Ontario
Denis Cordick	Grant Gunn	Kevin Stringer	Richard Garden		Toronto, Ontario
Peter Corner	Graeme McCarrel	Ian Tetley	Trevor Wall		Brampton, Ontario
Jeff Currie	Mike McCarville	Colin Koivula	Jamie Childs		Thunder Bay, Ontario
Mark Dacey	Tom Sullivan	Steve Burgess	Andrew Gibson		Halifax, Nova Scotia
Travis Dafoe	Shawn Amyotte	Andrew Tournay	Sean Leach		Bradford, Ontario
Brian Damon	Michael Stefanik	Charles Skinner, Jr.	Scott Parmalee		(New York (state)) Schenectady, New York
Brett Dekoning	Matt Mapletoft	Scott Brandon	Chris Jay		Chatham, Ontario
Dayna Deruelle	Andrew McGaugh	Kevin Lagerquist	Evan DeViller		Brampton, Ontario
Robert Desjardins	Jean-Sebastien Roy	Steven Munroe	Steeve Villeneuve		Chicoutimi, Quebec
Colin Dow	Brett Lyon-Hatcher	R.J Johnson	John Steski		Ottawa, Ontario
Korey Dropkin	Mark Fenner	Connor Hoge	Alex Fenson	Thomas Howell	Wayland, Massachusetts
Stephen Dropkin	Alex Leichter	Nate Clark	Matt Mielke		Boston, Massachusetts
Connor Duhaime	Evan Lilly	Tyler Jones	Matt Hardman		Haliburton, Ontario
Matt Dumontelle	Jordan Chandler	Kyle Chandler	Gavin Jamieson		Sudbury, Ontario
Niklas Edin	Sebastian Kraupp	Fredrik Lindberg	Viktor Kjäll		Karlstad, Sweden
John Epping	Scott Bailey	Scott Howard	David Mathers		Toronto, Ontario
Jeffrey Erickson	Lionel Locke	Merlin Orvig	John Krenz		St. Paul, Minnesota
Joe Fanset	Dale Fanset				Ingersoll, Ontario
Mike Farbelow	Kevin Deeren	Kraig Deeren	Mark Lazar		St. Paul, Minnesota
Jeff Faust	Dave Cook	Keith Plytnyk	Fabio Ferrante		Cookstown, Ontario
Eric Fenson	Trevor Andrews	Blake Morton	Calvin Weber		Bemidji, Minnesota
Pete Fenson	Shawn Rojeski	Joe Polo	Ryan Brunt		Bemidji, Minnesota
Martin Ferland	François Roberge	Shawn Fowler	Maxime Elmaleh		Quebec City, Quebec
Pat Ferris	Andrew Fairfull	Craig Fairfull	Rob Larmer		Grimsby, Ontario
Kyle Foster	Wes Jonasson	Rodney Legault	Darcy Jacobs		Arborg, Manitoba
Michael Fournier	Francois Gionest	Yannick Martel	Jean-François Charest		Montreal, Quebec
Rob Fowler	Allan Lyburn	Richard Daneault	Derek Samagalski		Brandon, Manitoba
Joe Frans	Ryan Werenich	Jeff Gorda	Shawn Kaufman		Bradford, Ontario
Dave Durness	Dan Dempsey	Francis Walsh	Les Kovacs		Brampton, Ontario
Sean Geall	Jay Peachey	Sebastien Robillard	Mark Olson		New Westminster, British Columbia
Christopher Plys (fourth)	Tyler George (skip)	Rich Ruohonen	Colin Hufman		Duluth, Minnesota
Gerry Geurts	Joe Geurts	Jacob Geurts	Archimedes Geurts		London, Ontario
Dale Gibbs	William Raymond	James Honsvall	Perry Tholl		St. Paul, Minnesota
Geoff Goodland	Tim Solin	Pete Westberg	Ken Olson		St. Paul, Minnesota
John Grant	Jeff Grant	Kevin Flewwelling	Larry Tobin		Toronto, Ontario
Brad Gushue	Adam Casey	Brett Gallant	Geoff Walker		St. John's, Newfoundland and Labrador
Al Hackner	Kory Carr	Kristofer Leupen	Gary Champagne		Thunder Bay, Ontario
Mark Haluptzok		Mark Haluptzok	Jon Chandler		Bemidji, Minnesota
Mike Harris	Phil Loevenmark	Scott Foster	Ken McDermot		Oakville, Ontario
Cory Heggestad	Wayne Warren	Derek Abbotts	Scott Borland		Orillia, Ontario
Guy Hemmings	François Gagné	Ghyslain Richard	Christian Bouchard		Montreal, Quebec
Brent Ross (fourth)	Jake Higgs (skip)	Codey Maus	Bill Buchanan		Harriston, Ontario
Mark Homan	Mike McLean	Brian Fleischhaker	Nathan Crawford		Ottawa, Ontario
Glenn Howard	Wayne Middaugh	Brent Laing	Craig Savill		Coldwater, Ontario
Ron Hrycak	Jeff Guignard	Rob Fraser	Joey Madeglia		Ottawa, Ontario
Jeff Hulse	Craig Glassford	A. J Hulse	Adam Melen		Orangeville, Ontario
Rayad Husain	Rik Aikman	Kris Keasowski	Jason Chang		Brampton, Ontario
Al Hutchinson	Kevin Daniel		John Glass		Owen Sound, Ontario
Bill Irwin	Ryan Labee	Brian Collins	Jim Hannigan		Barrie, Ontario
Brad Jacobs	Ryan Fry	E. J. Harnden	Ryan Harnden		Sault Ste. Marie, Ontario
Matt Seabrook (fourth)	Mike Jakubo (skip)	Sandy MacEwan	Lee Toner		Sudbury, Ontario
Evan Jensen	Daniel Metcalf	Dan Ruehl	Steve Gebauer		St. Paul, Minnesota
Mark Johnson	Jason Larway	Joel Larway	Christopher Rimple		(Washington (state)) Seattle, Washington
Wes Johnson	Punit Sthankiya	Kevin Hawkshaw	Mark Bresee		Toronto, Ontario
Dylan Johnston	Cody Johnston	Travis Showalter	Jay Turner		Thunder Bay, Ontario
Josh Johnston	Brian Chick	Matt Lowe	Ryan Parker		Toronto, Ontario
Andy Jukich	Lyle Sige	Matt Zyblut	Duane Rutan		Duluth, Minnesota
David Kaun	Robert Wright	John Gabel	Al Stahl		Kitchener, Ontario
Mark Kean	Travis Fanset	Patrick Janssen	Tim March		Toronto, Ontario
Harvey Keck	Waldo Gronsky	Jim Duggan	Jerrauld Lawler		Iowa City, Iowa
Mark Kehoe	Glen MacLeod	Ryan Garven	Richard Barker		Halifax, Nova Scotia
Dale Kelly	Ben Curtis	Mark Patterson	Ed DeSchutter		Chatham, Ontario
Kevin Koe	Pat Simmons	Carter Rycroft	Nolan Thiessen		Edmonton, Alberta
Axel Larsen	Walter Johnson	Gerry Sundwall	Kenny Cox		Guelph, Ontario
Shane Latimer	Ritchie Gillan	Terry Scharf	Kevin Rathwell		Ottawa, Ontario
Steve Laycock	Kirk Muyres	Colton Flasch	Dallan Muyres		Saskatoon, Saskatchewan
Ken Leach	Matt Weatherbie	Steve Flanigan	Rob Gatward		Stroud, Ontario
Simon Lejour	Yannick Lejour	Mathieu Lambert	Claude Chapdeelaine		Lacolle, Quebec
Philippe Lemay	Mathieu Beaufort	Jean-Michel Arsenault	Erik Lachance	Christian Cantin	Trois-Rivières, Quebec
Ryan Lemke	Nathan Gebert	John Lilla	Casey Konopacky		Medford, Wisconsin
Brian Lewis	Jeff McCrady	Steve Doty	Graham Sinclair		Ottawa, Ontario
Chris Lewis	Ryan McCrady	Matt Haughn	Cole Lyon-Hatcher		Carp, Ontario
Darcy Lindsay	George Porter	Sarah Clarkson	Gary Champagne		Thunder Bay, Ontario
Liu Rui	Xu Xiaoming	Zang Jialiang	Ba Dexin	Chen Lu'an	Harbin, China
Rob Lobel	Steven Lobel	Trevor Hewitt	Mike Shaye		Whitby, Ontario
William Lyburn	James Kirkness	Alex Forrest	Tyler Forrest		Winnipeg, Manitoba
Ian MacAulay	Steve Allen	Rick Allen	Barry Conrad		Ottawa, Ontario
Eddie MacKenzie	Anson Carmody	Christian Tolusso	Alex MacFayden		Charlottetown, Prince Edward Island
Scott Madams	Braden Zawada	Ian Fordyce	Nigel Milnes		Winnipeg, Manitoba
Jeremy Roe (fourth)	Steve Day	Richard Maskel (skip)	Mark Hartman		Madison, Wisconsin
Dale Matchett	Chris Wimmer	Kris Bourgeois	Duane Lindner		Cookstown, Ontario
Justin McBride	Ryan Harty	Mark Piskura	Joel Calhoun		Orange County, California
Jeff Currie (fourth)	Mike McCarville (skip)	Colin Koivula	Jamie Childs		Thunder Bay, Ontario
Heath McCormick	Matt Hames	Bill Stopera	Dean Gemmell		(New York (state)) New York City, New York
Scott McDonald	Ryan Myler	Chris De Cloet	Kevin Ackerman		London, Ontario
Mike McEwen	B.J. Neufeld	Matt Wozniak	Denni Neufeld		Winnipeg, Manitoba
Michael McGaugh	Jason Whitehill	Carson Walsh	Bryan Mitchell		Guelph, Ontario
Greg McLellan	Ken Graham	Rob Thomas	Gordon Henderson		Sault Ste. Marie, Ontario
Tim Meadows	Gary McCullough	Dave Munholland	Doug Underhill		Toronto, Ontario
Jean-Michel Ménard	Martin Crête	Éric Sylvain	Philippe Ménard		Quebec City, Quebec
Ethan Meyers	Kyle Kakela	Trevor Host	Cameron Ross		Duluth, Minnesota
Sven Michel	Claudio Pätz	Sandro Trolliet	Simon Gempeler		Adelboden, Switzerland
Joe Miller	Tom Worth	Brian Mathews	Geoff Scott		Toronto, Ontario
Jim Milosevich	Dale Gibbs	Mark Lusche	Neil Kay		St. Paul, Minnesota
Dustin Montpellier	Matt Mann	Carson Scarr	Gord Minty		Sudbury, Ontario
Dennis Moretto	Paul Attard	Howard Steele	Mike Nelson		Woodbridge, Ontario
Tim Morrison	Cary Luner	Dan Balachorek	Bruce Scott		Oshawa, Ontario
Jamie Murphy	Jordan Pinder	Mike Bardsley	Don McDermaid		Halifax, Nova Scotia
Frank O'Driscoll	Trent Skanes	Ian Kerr	Peter Watt		Ottawa, Ontario
Brent Palmer	Richard Chorkawy	Gary Stanhope	Rob Gregg		Burlington, Ontario
Kris Perkovich	Aaron Wald	Kevin Johnson	Taylor Skalsky		Chisholm, Minnesota
Greg Persinger	Nick Myers	Sean Murray	Tim Gartner		Fairbanks, Alaska
Dan Petryk (fourth)	Steve Petryk (skip)	Roland Robinson	Thomas Usselman		Calgary, Alberta
Darryl Prebble	Denis Belanger	Mark Koivula	Dennis Lemon		Toronto, Ontario
Tom Pruliere	Rob Pruliere	Jonathan Doan	Jeff Young		Sarnia, Ontario
Jeff Puleo	Derek Surka	Joel Cooper (Note: Cooper is now known as JayCee due to gender transition.)	Cooper Smith		Forest Lake, Minnesota
Howard Rajala	J.P Lachance	Chris Fulton	Paul Madden		Ottawa, Ontario
Fraser Reid	Blake Sandham	Jonah Mondloch	Rory James		Waterloo, Ontario
Joey Rettinger		Matt Johnson	Adam Alpaugh		Tara, Ontario
Greg Richardson	Paul Winford	Dan Baird	Mike Potter		Ottawa, Ontario
Nick Rizzo	Jim Wilson	Tom Roblin	Brian Bobbie		Brantford, Ontario
Ian Robertson	Guy Racette	Rob Retchless	Rob Ainsley		Dundas, Ontario
Gary Rowe	Mike Stachon	Jesse Ruppell	Rob Jennings		Ottawa, Ontario
Jean-Francois Royer	David Vallieres	Raphael Gendron	Jean-Oliver Hay		Montreal, Quebec
Robert Rumfeldt	Adam Spencer	Scott Hodgson	Greg Robinson		Guelph, Ontario
Tyler Runing	Dylan Deegan	Josh Moore	Eric Jaeger		Mankato, Minnesota
Tom Scott	Benjamin Wilson	Tony Wilson	John Scott		Hibbing, Minnesota
Daryl Shane	Bruce Cox	Dylan Tippin	Aaron Johnson		Waterloo, Ontario
Michael Shepherd	Jordan Keon	Curtis Samoy	Michael Keon		Richmond Hill, Ontario
Kieran Scott	Jamie Waters	Patrick Clarke	Brendan Craig		Hamilton, Ontario
John Shuster	Jeff Isaacson	Jared Zezel	John Landsteiner		Duluth, Minnesota
Markus Skogvold	Gaute Nepstad	Peder Siksjo	Sebastian Varmdal		Hamar, Norway
Brian Smith	Gord Smith	Son Greatrix	Andy Cinkant		Barrie, Ontario
Jason Camm (fourth)	Aaron Squires (skip)	Dave Easter	Curtis Easter		St. Thomas, Ontario
Jon St. Denis	Bobby Reid	Ian Fleming	Ken McLaren		Stouffville, Ontario
Matt Stevens	Cody Stevens	Robert Liapis	Jeff Breyen		Bemidji, Minnesota
Peter Stolt	Jerod Roland	Brad Caldwell	Erik Ordway		St. Paul, Minnesota
Jeff Stoughton	Jon Mead	Reid Carruthers	Mark Nichols		Winnipeg, Manitoba
Joey Taylor	Mathieu Garvel	Darren McEwen	Kevin Verberne		Ottawa, Ontario
Colin Thomas	Cory Schuh	Chris Ford	Spencer Wicks		St. John's, Newfoundland and Labrador
Andrew Thompson	Terry Archer	Craig Flegel	Jeff Gilbert		Stroud, Ontario
Wayne Tuck, Jr.	Chad Allen	Jay Allen	Caleb Flaxey		Toronto, Ontario
Brock Virtue	Braeden Moskowy	Chris Schille	D. J Kidby		Regina, Saskatchewan
Brennan Wark	Jordan Potter	Kyle Toset	Joel Adams		Thunder Bay, Ontario
George White	Scott Buchan	Matt Ignor	Graham Rae		Stratford, Ontario
Evan Workin	Parker Shook	Cole Jaeger	Spencer Tuskowski		Fargo, North Dakota
John Young, Jr.		Graeme Robson	Andrew Willemsma		Chatham, Ontario

== Women ==
As of September 22, 2012

Skip	Third	Second	Lead	Alternate	Locale
Ruth Alexander					London, Ontario
Chantal Allan	Evie Fortier	Brenda Holloway	Laura Neil		London, Ontario
Sarah Anderson	Kathleen Dubberstein	Taylor Anderson	Leilani Dubberstein	Abigail Suslavich	Philadelphia, Pennsylvania
Tiffany Anjema	Halyna Tepylo	Pam Feldkamp	Bridget Arnold		Waterloo, Ontario
Mary-Anne Arsenault	Colleen Jones	Kim Kelly	Jennifer Baxter	Nancy Delahunt	Halifax, Nova Scotia
Cathy Auld	Janet Murphy	Stephanie Gray	Melissa Foster	Clancy Grandy	Mississauga, Ontario
Marika Bakewell	Jessica Corrado	Stephanie Corrado	Jordan Robertson		Burlington, Ontario
Camile Boisvert	Taylor MacKay	Jenyfer Thirvierge	Sarah Benkirane	Jessica Emond	Montreal, Quebec
Erika Brown	Debbie McCormick	Jessica Schultz	Ann Swisshelm		Madison, Wisconsin
Chrissy Cadorin	Janet Langevin	Sandy Becher	Cindy McKnight		Toronto, Ontario
Chelsea Carey	Kristy McDonald	Kristen Foster	Lindsay Titheridge		Winnipeg, Manitoba
Alexandra Carlson	Monica Walker	Kendall Moulton	Jordan Moulton		Minneapolis, Minnesota
Mary Chilvers	Andrea Lawes	Debbie Thompson	Gloria Ryan		Whitby, Ontario
Cory Christensen	Rebecca Funk	Anna Bauman	Sonja Bauman		Duluth, Minnesota
Kelly Cochrane	Brenna Cochrane	Adele Campbell	Joanne Curtis		Toronto, Ontario
Gabrielle Coleman	Britt Rjanikov	Ann Drummie	Mary Shields		San Francisco, California
Ginger Coyle	Lauren Wood	Laura Brown	Robyn Murphy		Dundas, Ontario
Lisa Davies	Melissa Gannon	Alison Davies	Kelly Ryan		Montreal, Quebec
Melanie DeSchutter	Charlene Haluk-McMahon	Rachel Faust			San Francisco, California
Stacie Devereaux	Erin Porter	Lauren Wasylkiw	Heather Martin		St. John's, Newfoundland and Labrador
Tanilla Doyle	Joelle Horn	Lindsay Amundsen-Meyer	Christina Faulkner		Edmonton, Alberta
Dianne Dykstra	Melanie DeSchutter	Charlene Haluk-McMahon	Tara Maxwell		Chatham, Ontario
Brigid Ellig	Heather Van Sistine	Sara Shuster	Julia Boles		St. Paul, Minnesota
Lisa Farnell	Erin Morrissey	Karen Sagle	Ainsley Galbraith		Elgin, Ontario
Jaimee Gardner	Allison Farrell	Kim Brown	Trish Scharf		Ottawa, Ontario
Jenna Haag	Chloe Pahl	Grace Gabower	Erin Wallace	Brittany Falk	Janesville, Wisconsin
Becca Hamilton	Molly Bonner	Tara Peterson	Sophie Brorson		Madison, Wisconsin
Jacqueline Harrison	Kimberly Tuck	Susan Froud	Heather Nicol		Waterdown, Ontario
Jennifer Harvey	Lisa Lalonde	Julie Bridger	Lynn Macdonell		Cornwall, Ontario
Julie Hastings	Christy Trombley	Stacey Smith	Katrina Collins	Cheryl McPherson	Thornhill, Ontario
Kendall Haymes	Margot Flemming	Cassie Savage	Megan Arnold		Waterloo, Ontario
Bethany Heinrichs	Sandra Cowell	Jennie Hertner	Jen Chapman		Ilderton, Ontario
Courtney Hodgson	Jenna Bonner	Amanda Gebhardt	Amber Gebhardt		Guelph, Ontario
Rachel Homan	Emma Miskew	Alison Kreviazuk	Lisa Weagle		Ottawa, Ontario
Tracy Horgan	Jenn Seabrook	Jenna Enge	Amanda Gates		Sudbury, Ontario
Lauren Horton	Amanda Sinclair	Leigh Gustafson	Jessica Armstrong		Ottawa, Ontario
Shawnessy Johnson	Christine Loube	Heather E. Marshall			Toronto, Ontario
Ashley Kallos	Oye-Sem Won	Larissa Mikkelson	Jessica Williams		Thunder Bay, Ontario
Tirzah Keffer	Sheree Hinz	Megan Westlund	Rachel Camlin		Thunder Bay, Ontario
Barbara Kelly	Christine McCrady	Denise Hoekstra	Debbie Wall		Ottawa, Ontario
Casey Kidd	Laura LaBonte	Kristina Carr	Ashley Wall		Peterborough, Ontario
Chantal Lalonde	Shannon Harrington	Rachelle Vink	Tess Bobbie		London, Ontario
Patti Lank	Mackenzie Lank	Nina Spatola	Caitlin Maroldo		(New York (state)) Lewiston, New York
Marie-France Larouche	Brenda Nicholls	Véronique Grégoire	Amélie Blais		Lévis, Quebec
Kendra Lilly	Laura Forget	Courtney Chenier	Chantale Gaudreau		Sudbury, Ontario
Charrissa Lin	Sherri Schummer	Emilia Juocys	Senja Lopac		New Haven, Connecticut
Katie Lindsay	Nicole Westlund	Jenn Clark	Stephanie Thompson		Welland, Ontario
Erin Macaulay	Hailey Procak	Danielle Breedon	Christina Walters		Whitby, Ontario
Kelly MacIntosh	Jennifer Crouse	Sheena Gilman	Shelley Barker	Julie McEvoy	Dartmouth, Nova Scotia
Lauren Mann	Patricia Hill	Jen Ahde	Jessica Barcauskas		Ottawa, Ontario
Vicki Marianchuk	Louise Germain	Carolyn Edison	Lynne Corrado		Toronto, Ontario
Heather Marshall	Margie Hewitt	Amy Mackay	Abbie Darnley		Barrie, Ontario
Cheryl McBain	Sheryl Dobenko	France Charette	Susan Goheen		Ottawa, Ontario
Krista McCarville	Ashley Miharija	Kari Lavoie	Sarah Lang		Thunder Bay, Ontario
Susan McKnight	Catherine Kaino	Karen Rowsell	Jordan Ariss		Uxbridge, Ontario
Joyance Meechai	Casey Cucchiarelli	Jen Cahak	Courtney Shaw		(New York (state)) New York, New York
Angie Melaney	Dominique Lascelles	Marteen Lorti	Jennifer Rosborough		Lakefield, Ontario
Sherry Middaugh	Jo-Ann Rizzo	Lee Merklinger	Leigh Armstrong		Coldwater, Ontario
Katie Morrissey	Kiri Campbell	Lorelle Weiss	Cassandra de Groot		Ottawa, Ontario
Mari Motohashi	Yurika Yoshida	Megumi Mabuchi	Yumi Suzuki		Kitami, Japan
Jill Mouzar	Stephanie LeDrew	Danielle Inglis	Hollie Nicol	Courtney Davies	Toronto, Ontario
Eve Muirhead	Anna Sloan	Vicki Adams	Claire Hamilton		Stirling, Scotland
Allison Nimik	Katie Pringle	Lynn Kreviazuk	Morgan Court		Toronto, Ontario
Brit O'Neill	Mallory Buist	Jenn Minchin	Jasmine Thurston		Hamilton, Ontario
Chantal Osborne	Joëlle Sabourin	Catherine Derick	Sylvie Daniel		Thurso, Quebec
Cathy Overton-Clapham	Jenna Loder	Ashley Howard	Breanne Meakin		Winnipeg, Manitoba
Laura Payne	Alexis Riordan	Lynsey Longfield	Ailsa Leitch		Ottawa, Ontario
Sarah Picton	Lynne Flegel	Claire Archer	Marit Lee		Stroud, Ontario
Cassie Potter	Jamie Haskell	Jackie Lemke	Steph Sambor	Laura Roessler	St. Paul, Minnesota
Allison Pottinger	Nicole Joraanstad	Natalie Nicholson	Tabitha Peterson		St. Paul, Minnesota
Lesley Pyne	Sharon Shynkaruk	Suzanne Miller	Katie Hickey		Ajax, Ontario
Julie Reddick	Carrie Lindner	Megan Balsdon	Laura Hickey		Toronto, Ontario
Caitlin Romain	Carly Howard	Kerilynn Mathers	Cheryl Kreviazuk		Kitchener, Ontario
Allison Ross	Audree Dufresne	Brittany O'Rourke	Sasha Beauchamp		Montreal, Quebec
Kirsty Russell	Michelle Gray	Tina Mazerolle	Allison Singh		Shelburne, Ontario
Anna Sidorova	Liudmilla Privivkova	Margarita Fomina	Ekaterina Galkina	Nkeiruka Ezekh	Moscow, Russia
Jamie Sinclair	Holly Donaldson	Erin Jenkins	Katelyn Wasylkiw		Manotick, Ontario
Margie Smith	Norma O'Leary	Debbie Dexter	Shelly Kosal		St. Paul, Minnesota
Miranda Solem	Vicky Persenger	Karlie Koenig	Chelsea Solem		Cohasset, Minnesota
Jennifer Spencer	Karyn Issler	Jenn Ellard	Michelle Laidlaw		Brampton, Ontario
Megan Van Huyse	Joan Moore	Hailey Procak	Madisson Lank	Kirsti Davis	Toronto, Ontario
Stephanie Van Huyse	Sheryl Tavoularis	Laura Arbour	Jennifer Allan		Whitby, Ontario
Rhonda Varnes	Tanya Rodrigues	Nicol McNiven	Breanne Merklinger		Ottawa, Ontario
Kimberly Wapola	Cynthia Eng-Dinsel	Carol Strojny	Ann Flis		St. Paul, Minnesota
Ashley Waye	Denise Donovan	Naomi Visanji	MArnie Loeb		Toronto, Ontario
Marla Weinberger	Laura Roe	Kelly Senkiw	Nicole Vaillancourt		Ottawa, Ontario
Amy Wright	Courtney George	Aileen Sormunen	Amanda McLean		Duluth, Minnesota
Olga Zyablikova	Victorya Moiseeva	Ekaterina Antonova	Galina Arsenkina		Moscow, Russia
