= Ingersoll Clash =

The Ingersoll Clash was an annual bonspiel on the men's and women's Ontario Curling Tour. It was held annually in September at the Ingersoll & District Curling Club in Ingersoll, Ontario. It was discontinued after 2014

== Past Men's Champions ==
Year	Winning skip	Runner up skip	Purse (CAD)
2004	(Ontario) Andrew Fairfull		
2005	(Ontario) Joe Frans		
2006	(Ontario) Wayne Warren		
2007	(Ontario) Steve Cartwright		
2008	(Ontario) Kirk Ziola	(Ontario) John Wilson	
2009	(Quebec) Guy Hemmings	(Ontario) Rob Rumfeldt	
2010	(Ontario) Bob Armstrong	(Ontario) Terry Corbin	$11,000
2011	(Ontario) Richard Krell	(Ontario) Bob Armstrong	$10,500
2012	(Ontario) Terry Corbin	(Ontario) Brett Dekoning	$10,500
2013	(Ontario) Rob Retchless	(Ontario) Terry Corbin	$10,500
2014	(Ontario) Pat Ferris	(Ontario) Scott McDonald	$8,000

== Past Women's Champions ==
Year	Winning skip	Runner up skip	Purse (CAD)
2004	(Ontario) Karen Bell		
2005	(Ontario) Stacey Brandwood		
2006	(Ontario) Sherry Middaugh		
2007	(Ontario) Jacqueline Harrison		
2008	(Wisconsin) Erika Brown		
2011	(Ontario) Stephanie Van Huyse	(Ontario) Susan McKnight	$3,000
2012	(Ontario) Chantal Lalonde	(Ontario) Susan McKnight	$6,000
2013	(Ontario) Chantal Lalonde	(Ontario) Dianne Dykstra	$3,200
2014	(Ontario) Amie Shackleton	(Ontario) Shannon Kee	$3,200
