= 2012 Carleton Heights Women's Cash =

- Host city: Ottawa, Ontario
- Arena: Carleton Heights Curling Club
- Dates: September 6–9
- Winner: (Ontario) Lauren Horton
- Curling club: Ottawa, Ontario
- Skip: Lauren Horton
- Third: Andrea Sinclair
- Second: Leigh Gustafson
- Lead: Jessica Armstrong
- Finalist: (Ontario) Katie Morrissey

The 2012 Carleton Heights Women's Cash was held from September 6 to 9 at the Carleton Heights Curling Club in Ottawa, Ontario as part of the 2012–13 Ontario Curling Tour. The event was held in a round robin format.

== Teams ==
Skip	Third	Second	Lead	Locale
Camile Boisvert	Taylor MacKay	Jenyfer Thirvierge	Sarah Benkirane	Montreal, Quebec
Lisa Davies	Melissa Gannon	Alison Davies	Kelly Ryan	Montreal, Quebec
Jaimee Gardner	Allison Farrell	Kim Brown	Trish Scharf	Ottawa, Ontario
Lauren Horton	Amanda Sinclair	Leigh Gustafson	Jessica Armstrong	Ottawa, Ontario
Barbara Kelly	Christine McCrady	Denise Hoekstra	Debbie Wall	Ottawa, Ontario
Lauren Mann	Patricia Hill	Jen Ahde	Jessica Barcauskas	Ottawa, Ontario
Katie Morrissey	Kiri Campbell	Lorelle Weiss	Cassandra de Groot	Ottawa, Ontario
Laura Payne	Alexis Riordan	Lynsey Longfield	Ailsa Leitch	Ottawa, Ontario
Rhonda Varnes	Tanya Rodrigues	Nicol McNiven	Breanne Merklinger	Ottawa, Ontario

=== Round-robin standings ===
Key
Teams to Playoffs
Teams to Tiebreaker

	W	L
(Ontario) Lauren Horton	4	0
(Ontario) Jaimee Gardner	3	1
(Ontario) Katie Morrissey	3	1
(Quebec) Lisa Davies	2	2
(Ontario) Barbara Kelly	2	2
(Ontario) Laura Payne	2	2
(Quebec) Camile Boisvert	1	3
(Ontario) Lauren Mann	1	3
(Ontario) Rhonda Varnes	0	4

== Tiebreakers ==
Team	Final
(Ontario) Laura Payne	7
(Ontario) Barbara Kelly	3

Team	Final
(Quebec) Lisa Davies	2
(Ontario) Laura Payne	6

== Playoffs ==
Semifinals
(Ontario) Lauren Horton	7
(Ontario) Laura Payne	5
(Ontario) Katie Morrissey	9
(Ontario) Jaimee Gardner	4

Finals
(Ontario) Lauren Horton	9
(Ontario) Katie Morrissey	2

- Results from the CurlingZone database
