= 2013 Canadian Junior Curling Championships – Men's tournament =

2013 Canadian Junior Curling Championships Men's tournament
- Host city: Fort McMurray, Alberta
- Arena: Suncor Community Leisure Centre; Oilsands Curling Club
- Dates: January 31 – February 10
- Winner: Manitoba
- Curling club: West Kildonan CC, Winnipeg
- Skip: Matt Dunstone
- Third: Colton Lott
- Second: Daniel Grant
- Lead: Brendan MacCuish
- Coach: Scott Grant
- Finalist: Alberta (Thomas Scoffin)

The men's tournament of the 2013 Canadian Junior Curling Championships was held from January 31 to February 10 at the Suncor Community Leisure Centre at MacDonald Island Park and at the Oilsands Curling Club in Fort McMurray, Alberta.

== Competition format ==
All of the teams will compete in a round robin tournament consisting of two pools of seven teams each. At the conclusion of the preliminary round robin, the top four teams in each pool advance to the championship pool, while the rest of the teams move to the seeding pool. The teams in both the championship and seeding pools will play against the teams from their other pools. At the conclusion of the championship and seeding pools, the win–loss records of both pools will be combined for the final ranking. The top three teams in this ranking advance to the playoffs, where the second- and third-ranked teams will play in the semifinal, and the winner of the semifinal will play the first-ranked team in the final.

== Teams ==
The teams are listed as follows:

Province	Skip	Third	Second	Lead	Club(s)
Alberta	Thomas Scoffin	Dylan Gosseau	Landon Bucholz	Bryce Bucholz	Saville Sports Centre, Edmonton
British Columbia	Tyler Klymchuk	Corey Chester	Sanjay Bowry	Rhys Gamache	Langley Curling Club, Langley; Victoria Curling Club, Victoria
Manitoba	Matt Dunstone	Colton Lott	Daniel Grant	Brendan MacCuish	West Kildonan Curling Club, Winnipeg
New Brunswick	Josh Barry	Rene Comeau	Spencer Watts	Andrew O'Dell	Capital Winter Club, Fredericton
Newfoundland and Labrador	Adam Boland	Shane Hopkins	Patrick Short	Andrew Taylor	Gander Curling Club, Gander
Northern Ontario	Matt Roberts	Zach Warkentin	Mackenzie Joblin	Will Perozak	Port Arthur Curling Club, Thunder Bay
Northwest Territories	Daniel Murray	Matthew Miller	John Murray	Randy Hiebert	Yellowknife Curling Club, Yellowknife
Nova Scotia	Stuart Thompson	Scott Babin	Luke Saunders	Alex MacNeil	Mayflower Curling Club, Halifax
Nunavut	David Kakuktinniq	Brandyn Airut	Jamie Airut	Darren Makkigak	Rankin Inlet Curling Club, Rankin Inlet
Ontario	Jason Camm	Aaron Squires (skip)	David Easter	Curtis Easter	St. Thomas Curling Club, St. Thomas
Prince Edward Island	Tyler Smith	Alex Sutherland	Alex Jenkins	Jonathan Schut	Cornwall Curling Club, Cornwall
Quebec	Félix Asselin	Marc-Alexandre Dion	Lewis South	Sami Guimond-Jaber	Glenmore Curling Club, Dollard-des-Ormeaux
Saskatchewan	Brady Scharback	Quinn Hersikorn	Jake Hersikorn	Brady Kendel	Sutherland Curling Club, Saskatoon
Yukon	Mitchell Young (fourth)	Will Mahoney (skip)	Joe Wallingham	Spencer Wallace	Whitehorse Curling Club, Whitehorse

== Round-robin standings ==
Final round-robin standings

Key
Teams to Championship Pool

Pool A	Skip	W	L
Alberta	Thomas Scoffin	5	1
Ontario	Aaron Squires	5	1
Saskatchewan	Brady Scharback	4	2
British Columbia	Tyler Klymchuk	3	3
Prince Edward Island	Tyler Smith	2	4
Yukon	Will Mahoney	2	4
Nunavut	David Kakuktinniq	0	6

Pool B	Skip	W	L
New Brunswick	Josh Barry	5	1
Nova Scotia	Stuart Thompson	5	1
Manitoba	Matt Dunstone	4	2
Quebec	Félix Asselin	3	3
Newfoundland and Labrador	Adam Boland	2	4
Northern Ontario	Matt Roberts	2	4
Northwest Territories	Daniel Murray	0	6

== Round-robin results ==
All draw times are listed in Mountain Standard Time (UTC−7).

=== Pool A ===
==== Draw 1 ====
Saturday, February 2, 1:00 pm

Sheet A	1	2	3	4	5	6	7	8	9	10	Final
Alberta (Scoffin)	0	1	0	0	1	2	0	0	0	0	4
Ontario (Squires) 🔨	1	0	0	2	0	0	0	0	0	2	5

Sheet C	1	2	3	4	5	6	7	8	9	10	Final
Nunavut (Kakuktinniq)	0	0	0	1	0	0	0	1	X	X	2
Saskatchewan (Scharback) 🔨	3	1	3	0	2	1	4	0	X	X	14

Sheet E	1	2	3	4	5	6	7	8	9	10	Final
Yukon (Mahoney) 🔨	3	0	0	0	1	2	1	0	X	X	7
Prince Edward Island (Smith)	0	1	1	0	0	0	0	1	X	X	3

==== Draw 2 ====
Saturday, February 2, 6:30 pm

Sheet G	1	2	3	4	5	6	7	8	9	10	Final
British Columbia (Klymchuk) 🔨	1	2	0	2	2	0	2	2	X	X	11
Nunavut (Kakuktinniq)	0	0	1	0	0	1	0	0	X	X	2

Sheet I	1	2	3	4	5	6	7	8	9	10	Final
Ontario (Squires) 🔨	2	0	3	0	3	0	0	0	1	X	9
Yukon (Mahoney)	0	1	0	1	0	2	0	1	0	X	5

Sheet K	1	2	3	4	5	6	7	8	9	10	Final
Prince Edward Island (Smith)	0	1	0	1	0	2	0	1	1	X	6
Saskatchewan (Scharback) 🔨	1	0	3	0	2	0	1	0	0	X	7

==== Draw 3 ====
Sunday, February 3, 1:00 pm

Sheet B	1	2	3	4	5	6	7	8	9	10	Final
Saskatchewan (Scharback)	0	0	1	0	3	0	0	0	0	X	4
Alberta (Scoffin) 🔨	3	0	0	1	0	2	0	0	2	X	8

Sheet D	1	2	3	4	5	6	7	8	9	10	Final
Prince Edward Island (Smith) 🔨	3	0	0	3	1	1	1	0	X	X	9
Nunavut (Kakuktinniq)	0	1	3	0	0	0	0	1	X	X	5

Sheet F	1	2	3	4	5	6	7	8	9	10	11	Final
British Columbia (Klymchuk)	0	1	0	0	1	2	0	1	0	0	1	6
Ontario (Squires) 🔨	2	0	1	0	0	0	1	0	0	1	0	5

==== Draw 4 ====
Sunday, February 3, 6:00 pm

Sheet B	1	2	3	4	5	6	7	8	9	10	Final
Yukon (Mahoney) 🔨	2	0	1	0	2	2	0	0	0	0	7
British Columbia (Klymchuk)	0	1	0	3	0	0	1	2	1	3	11

Sheet J	1	2	3	4	5	6	7	8	9	10	Final
Nunavut (Kakuktinniq)	0	0	0	1	0	0	1	0	X	X	2
Alberta (Scoffin) 🔨	4	1	4	0	6	4	0	3	X	X	22

==== Draw 6 ====
Monday, February 4, 2:00 pm

Sheet I	1	2	3	4	5	6	7	8	9	10	Final
Saskatchewan (Scharback) 🔨	2	1	0	0	0	2	0	2	2	X	9
British Columbia (Klymchuk)	0	0	1	1	1	0	1	0	0	X	4

Sheet J	1	2	3	4	5	6	7	8	9	10	Final
Ontario (Squires)	1	0	1	0	0	1	2	2	X	X	8
Prince Edward Island (Smith) 🔨	0	0	0	2	0	0	0	0	X	X	2

Sheet K	1	2	3	4	5	6	7	8	9	10	Final
Nunavut (Kakuktinniq)	0	0	0	0	1	0	0	1	X	X	2
Yukon (Mahoney) 🔨	2	1	1	2	0	0	1	0	X	X	7

==== Draw 7 ====
Monday, February 4, 7:00 pm

Sheet A	1	2	3	4	5	6	7	8	9	10	Final
Prince Edward Island (Smith) 🔨	0	1	0	0	1	1	0	0	1	1	5
British Columbia (Klymchuk)	1	0	1	0	0	0	1	1	0	0	4

Sheet D	1	2	3	4	5	6	7	8	9	10	11	Final
Saskatchewan (Scharback)	0	0	2	0	0	1	0	2	0	2	0	7
Ontario (Squires) 🔨	0	1	0	2	1	0	2	0	1	0	1	8

Sheet F	1	2	3	4	5	6	7	8	9	10	Final
Alberta (Scoffin) 🔨	1	0	1	0	2	0	0	0	1	1	6
Yukon (Mahoney)	0	1	0	1	0	0	2	0	0	0	4

==== Draw 8 ====
Tuesday, February 5, 1:00 pm

Sheet A	1	2	3	4	5	6	7	8	9	10	Final
Yukon (Mahoney)	1	0	1	0	0	0	0	1	0	X	3
Saskatchewan (Scharback) 🔨	0	1	0	0	2	1	1	0	2	X	7

Sheet G	1	2	3	4	5	6	7	8	9	10	Final
Alberta (Scoffin) 🔨	0	3	0	0	2	3	0	0	X	X	8
Prince Edward Island (Smith)	0	0	2	1	0	0	1	0	X	X	4

==== Draw 9 ====
Tuesday, February 5, 6:00 pm

Sheet D	1	2	3	4	5	6	7	8	9	10	Final
British Columbia (Klymchuk)	1	0	1	0	1	0	2	0	0	X	5
Alberta (Scoffin) 🔨	0	3	0	1	0	1	0	2	2	X	9

Sheet E	1	2	3	4	5	6	7	8	9	10	Final
Ontario (Squires)	2	1	1	2	0	2	0	2	X	X	10
Nunavut (Kakuktinniq) 🔨	0	0	0	0	0	0	1	0	X	X	1

=== Pool B ===
==== Draw 1 ====
Saturday, February 2, 1:00 pm

Sheet G	1	2	3	4	5	6	7	8	9	10	Final
Northern Ontario (Roberts) 🔨	0	0	2	0	0	1	0	0	X	X	3
Nova Scotia (Thompson)	1	1	0	1	1	0	3	3	X	X	10

Sheet I	1	2	3	4	5	6	7	8	9	10	Final
Northwest Territories (Murray)	0	0	0	0	0	0	0	0	X	X	0
Manitoba (Dunstone) 🔨	0	4	1	1	1	1	3	1	X	X	12

Sheet K	1	2	3	4	5	6	7	8	9	10	Final
New Brunswick (Barry) 🔨	0	4	0	1	0	1	0	1	3	X	10
Newfoundland and Labrador (Boland)	2	0	1	0	2	0	1	0	0	X	6

==== Draw 2 ====
Saturday, February 2, 6:30 pm

Sheet B	1	2	3	4	5	6	7	8	9	10	Final
Quebec (Asselin) 🔨	0	2	2	1	0	0	2	0	0	0	7
Northwest Territories (Murray)	1	0	0	0	1	2	0	0	1	1	6

Sheet D	1	2	3	4	5	6	7	8	9	10	Final
Nova Scotia (Thompson) 🔨	0	0	1	0	0	1	0	2	X	X	4
New Brunswick (Barry)	1	1	0	3	3	0	3	0	X	X	11

Sheet F	1	2	3	4	5	6	7	8	9	10	Final
Newfoundland and Labrador (Boland) 🔨	1	0	2	0	1	0	1	0	2	X	7
Manitoba (Dunstone)	0	1	0	1	0	0	0	2	0	X	4

==== Draw 3 ====
Sunday, February 3, 1:00 pm

Sheet J	1	2	3	4	5	6	7	8	9	10	Final
Northwest Territories (Murray) 🔨	0	1	0	1	0	0	0	1	X	X	3
Northern Ontario (Roberts)	2	0	1	0	3	0	3	0	X	X	9

==== Draw 4 ====
Sunday, February 3, 6:00 pm

Sheet A	1	2	3	4	5	6	7	8	9	10	Final
Nova Scotia (Thompson) 🔨	0	2	0	0	2	1	0	2	4	X	11
Newfoundland and Labrador (Boland)	1	0	2	2	0	0	0	0	0	X	5

Sheet E	1	2	3	4	5	6	7	8	9	10	Final
Manitoba (Dunstone)	2	1	0	0	0	4	0	0	3	X	10
Northern Ontario (Roberts) 🔨	0	0	1	1	0	0	1	1	0	X	4

Sheet F	1	2	3	4	5	6	7	8	9	10	Final
New Brunswick (Barry)	1	0	1	0	3	0	2	1	1	X	9
Quebec (Asselin) 🔨	0	2	0	3	0	1	0	0	0	X	6

==== Draw 5 ====
Monday, February 4, 9:00 am

Sheet B	1	2	3	4	5	6	7	8	9	10	Final
Northern Ontario (Roberts)	0	0	0	3	0	1	0	1	X	X	5
New Brunswick (Barry) 🔨	3	4	1	0	5	0	0	0	X	X	13

Sheet D	1	2	3	4	5	6	7	8	9	10	Final
Manitoba (Dunstone)	1	3	1	0	1	0	0	2	X	X	8
Quebec (Asselin) 🔨	0	0	0	1	0	0	1	0	X	X	2

==== Draw 6 ====
Monday, February 4, 2:00 pm

Sheet A	1	2	3	4	5	6	7	8	9	10	Final
Northwest Territories (Murray)	0	0	0	1	0	0	1	0	X	X	2
New Brunswick (Barry) 🔨	2	2	1	0	1	2	0	1	X	X	9

Sheet B	1	2	3	4	5	6	7	8	9	10	Final
Manitoba (Dunstone) 🔨	0	0	1	0	0	0	1	0	1	0	3
Nova Scotia (Thompson)	0	2	0	1	0	0	0	1	0	0	4

Sheet E	1	2	3	4	5	6	7	8	9	10	Final
Newfoundland and Labrador (Boland)	0	0	1	0	0	1	0	0	2	0	4
Quebec (Asselin) 🔨	0	0	0	2	1	0	1	2	0	0	6

==== Draw 7 ====
Monday, February 4, 7:00 pm

Sheet I	1	2	3	4	5	6	7	8	9	10	Final
Northern Ontario (Roberts) 🔨	2	1	0	2	3	0	1	0	X	X	9
Newfoundland and Labrador (Boland)	0	0	1	0	0	1	0	1	X	X	3

==== Draw 8 ====
Tuesday, February 5, 1:00 pm

Sheet C	1	2	3	4	5	6	7	8	9	10	Final
Newfoundland and Labrador (Boland) 🔨	0	5	1	0	0	0	0	0	2	X	8
Northwest Territories (Murray)	1	0	0	0	0	1	0	1	0	X	3

Sheet K	1	2	3	4	5	6	7	8	9	10	Final
Quebec (Asselin) 🔨	1	0	0	0	0	1	1	0	0	0	3
Nova Scotia (Thompson)	0	1	2	0	0	0	0	1	0	1	5

==== Draw 9 ====
Tuesday, February 5, 6:00 pm

Sheet C	1	2	3	4	5	6	7	8	9	10	Final
Quebec (Asselin) 🔨	0	2	0	1	1	0	1	1	0	X	6
Northern Ontario (Roberts)	1	0	1	0	0	0	0	0	2	X	4

Sheet H	1	2	3	4	5	6	7	8	9	10	Final
Nova Scotia (Thompson) 🔨	0	2	1	0	1	0	2	3	X	X	9
Northwest Territories (Murray)	1	0	0	0	0	1	0	0	X	X	2

Sheet J	1	2	3	4	5	6	7	8	9	10	Final
Manitoba (Dunstone) 🔨	3	0	2	1	3	0	1	0	X	X	10
New Brunswick (Barry)	0	2	0	0	0	1	0	2	X	X	5

== Placement Round ==
=== Championship Pool ===
==== Standings ====
Final Standings

Key
Teams to Playoffs
Teams to Tiebreaker

Province	Skip	W	L
Alberta	Thomas Scoffin	9	1
Nova Scotia	Stuart Thompson	8	2
Manitoba	Matt Dunstone	7	3
Ontario	Aaron Squires	7	3
New Brunswick	Josh Barry	6	4
Saskatchewan	Brady Scharback	6	4
British Columbia	Tyler Klymchuk	4	6
Quebec	Félix Asselin	3	7

==== Results ====
===== Draw 1 =====
Wednesday, February 6, 1:00 pm

Sheet B	1	2	3	4	5	6	7	8	9	10	Final
Quebec (Asselin)	1	0	0	1	0	0	0	1	1	X	4
Ontario (Squires) 🔨	0	1	1	0	2	1	1	0	0	X	6

Sheet D	1	2	3	4	5	6	7	8	9	10	Final
Alberta (Scoffin)	0	1	0	2	0	0	1	2	4	X	10
New Brunswick (Barry) 🔨	0	0	1	0	3	0	0	0	0	X	4

Sheet F	1	2	3	4	5	6	7	8	9	10	Final
Nova Scotia (Thompson) 🔨	0	0	3	0	3	0	0	3	X	X	9
Saskatchewan (Scharback)	0	1	0	2	0	0	1	0	X	X	4

Sheet H	1	2	3	4	5	6	7	8	9	10	11	Final
British Columbia (Klymchuk) 🔨	2	0	0	1	0	0	1	0	2	1	0	7
Manitoba (Dunstone)	0	1	1	0	1	3	0	1	0	0	1	8

===== Draw 2 =====
Wednesday, February 6, 6:00 pm

Sheet A	1	2	3	4	5	6	7	8	9	10	Final
Manitoba (Dunstone)	0	0	3	0	0	2	0	0	0	3	8
Ontario (Squires) 🔨	1	0	0	1	2	0	0	1	1	0	6

Sheet C	1	2	3	4	5	6	7	8	9	10	Final
Quebec (Asselin)	0	0	1	1	0	1	0	1	0	0	4
Alberta (Scoffin) 🔨	3	0	0	0	1	0	0	0	1	2	7

Sheet E	1	2	3	4	5	6	7	8	9	10	Final
New Brunswick (Barry) 🔨	2	0	0	0	1	0	1	1	0	0	5
Saskatchewan (Scharback)	0	1	1	1	0	2	0	0	2	0	7

Sheet G	1	2	3	4	5	6	7	8	9	10	Final
Nova Scotia (Thompson)	0	1	0	1	0	1	0	0	2	1	6
British Columbia (Klymchuk) 🔨	1	0	0	0	2	0	0	1	0	0	4

===== Draw 3 =====
Thursday, February 7, 1:00 pm

Sheet A	1	2	3	4	5	6	7	8	9	10	Final
Alberta (Scoffin)	0	1	0	2	0	1	2	0	0	1	7
Nova Scotia (Thompson)	0	0	1	0	2	0	0	1	1	0	5

Sheet C	1	2	3	4	5	6	7	8	9	10	Final
Ontario (Squires)	2	0	1	0	1	0	2	1	0	1	8
New Brunswick (Barry)	0	2	0	1	0	1	0	0	3	0	7

===== Draw 4 =====
Thursday, February 7, 6:00 pm

Sheet A	1	2	3	4	5	6	7	8	9	10	Final
New Brunswick (Barry) 🔨	2	1	0	0	3	1	0	2	X	X	9
British Columbia (Klymchuk)	0	0	1	1	0	0	2	0	X	x	4

Sheet B	1	2	3	4	5	6	7	8	9	10	Final
Manitoba (Dunstone)	0	1	0	1	0	1	0	0	X	X	3
Alberta (Scoffin) 🔨	2	0	2	0	2	0	1	1	X	X	8

Sheet D	1	2	3	4	5	6	7	8	9	10	Final
Ontario (Squires)	0	0	0	1	0	1	2	0	1	X	5
Nova Scotia (Thompson) 🔨	2	1	0	0	2	0	0	2	0	X	7

Sheet H	1	2	3	4	5	6	7	8	9	10	Final
Saskatchewan (Scharback)	2	0	0	1	1	0	2	0	1	X	7
Quebec (Asselin)	0	0	1	0	0	1	0	2	0	X	4

===== Draw 5 =====
Friday, February 8, 8:00 am

Sheet D	1	2	3	4	5	6	7	8	9	10	11	Final
Saskatchewan (Scharback) 🔨	1	0	0	2	0	0	0	0	0	2	0	5
Manitoba (Dunstone)	0	0	2	0	1	1	0	1	0	0	1	6

Sheet E	1	2	3	4	5	6	7	8	9	10	Final
British Columbia (Klymchuk) 🔨	0	1	0	3	1	1	0	0	2	X	8
Quebec (Asselin)	1	0	1	0	0	0	2	1	0	X	5

==== Championship Pool Tiebreaker ====
Friday, February 8, 1:00 pm

Sheet B	1	2	3	4	5	6	7	8	9	10	Final
Manitoba (Dunstone) 🔨	2	0	1	0	1	0	2	0	3	2	11
Ontario (Squires)	0	3	0	2	0	1	0	2	0	0	8

Player percentages
Manitoba		Ontario	
Brendan MacCuish	70%	Curtis Easter	84%
Daniel Grant	78%	David Easter	65%
Colton Lott	68%	Jason Camm	68%
Matt Dunstone	68%	Aaron Squires	70%
Total	71%	Total	72%

=== Seeding Pool ===
==== Standings ====
Province	Skip	W	L
Yukon	Will Mahoney	5	4
Newfoundland and Labrador	Adam Boland	4	5
Northern Ontario	Matt Roberts	4	5
Prince Edward Island	Tyler Smith	3	6
Northwest Territories	Daniel Murray	1	8
Nunavut	David Kakuktinniq	0	9

==== Results ====
===== Draw 1 =====
Wednesday, February 6, 1:00 pm

Sheet I	1	2	3	4	5	6	7	8	9	10	Final
Yukon (Mahoney)	0	3	3	1	0	3	4	0	X	X	14
Northwest Territories (Murray) 🔨	0	0	0	0	1	0	0	1	X	X	2

Sheet K	1	2	3	4	5	6	7	8	9	10	11	Final
Northern Ontario (Roberts) 🔨	0	1	0	0	1	1	0	0	2	0	3	8
Prince Edward Island (Smith)	0	0	2	0	0	0	0	1	0	2	0	5

===== Draw 2 =====
Wednesday, February 6, 6:00 pm

Sheet K	1	2	3	4	5	6	7	8	9	10	Final
Newfoundland and Labrador (Boland)	1	6	4	1	0	2	1	2	X	X	17
Nunavut (Kakuktinniq) 🔨	0	0	0	0	0	0	0	0	X	X	0

===== Draw 3 =====
Thursday, February 7, 1:00 pm

Sheet F	1	2	3	4	5	6	7	8	9	10	Final
Yukon (Mahoney)	0	0	0	1	2	0	0	3	0	1	7
Northern Ontario (Roberts) 🔨	2	0	0	0	0	0	2	0	2	0	6

Sheet G	1	2	3	4	5	6	7	8	9	10	Final
Northwest Territories (Murray) 🔨	0	1	0	1	0	0	1	0	X	X	3
Prince Edward Island (Smith)	3	0	1	0	4	1	0	3	X	X	12

===== Draw 4 =====
Thursday, February 7, 6:00 pm

Sheet I	1	2	3	4	5	6	7	8	9	10	Final
Nunavut (Kakuktinniq)	1	0	0	0	0	0	0	0	X	X	1
Northern Ontario (Roberts) 🔨	0	2	0	1	2	1	1	2	X	X	9

Sheet J	1	2	3	4	5	6	7	8	9	10	Final
Yukon (Mahoney) 🔨	2	0	0	0	3	0	1	2	0	X	8
Newfoundland and Labrador (Boland)	0	0	1	1	0	2	0	0	1	X	5

===== Draw 6 =====
Friday, February 8, 1:00 pm

Sheet C	1	2	3	4	5	6	7	8	9	10	Final
Newfoundland and Labrador (Boland)	1	0	1	0	2	0	2	0	2	X	8
Prince Edward Island (Smith) 🔨	0	2	0	2	0	1	0	1	0	X	6

Sheet D	1	2	3	4	5	6	7	8	9	10	Final
Nunavut (Kakuktinniq)	0	1	1	0	0	0	0	1	0	X	3
Northwest Territories (Murray) 🔨	3	0	0	1	0	1	2	0	0	X	7

== Playoffs ==
Semifinal			Final
			1	Alberta	3
2	Nova Scotia	4	3	Manitoba	4
3	Manitoba	9

=== Semifinal ===
Saturday, February 9, 10:30 am

Sheet B	1	2	3	4	5	6	7	8	9	10	Final
Nova Scotia (Thompson) 🔨	0	1	0	0	2	0	1	0	0	X	4
Manitoba (Dunstone)	0	0	0	3	0	1	0	3	2	X	9

Player percentages
Nova Scotia		Manitoba	
Alex MacNeil	97%	Brendan MacCuish	93%
Luke Saunders	81%	Daniel Grant	94%
Scott Babin	76%	Colton Lott	93%
Stuart Thompson	72%	Matt Dunstone	88%
Total	82%	Total	92%

=== Final ===
Saturday, February 9, 5:00 pm

Sheet B	1	2	3	4	5	6	7	8	9	10	Final
Alberta (Scoffin) 🔨	0	1	0	0	0	0	0	1	1	0	3
Manitoba (Dunstone)	0	0	0	0	2	1	0	0	0	1	4

Player percentages
Alberta		Manitoba	
Bryce Bucholz	91%	Brendan MacCuish	86%
Landon Bucholz	88%	Daniel Grant	98%
Dylan Gosseau	80%	Colton Lott	96%
Thomas Scoffin	88%	Matt Dunstone	84%
Total	87%	Total	91%

== Awards ==
The all-star teams and award winners are as follows:

=== All-Star teams ===
First Team

- Skip: Thomas Scoffin, Alberta
- Third: Colton Lott, Manitoba
- Second: David Easter, Ontario
- Lead: Andrew O'Dell, New Brunswick

Second Team

- Skip: Stuart Thompson, Nova Scotia
- Third: Aaron Squires, Ontario
- Second: Daniel Grant, Manitoba
- Lead: Brendan MacCuish, Manitoba

=== Ken Watson Sportsmanship Awards ===
- Landon Bucholz, Alberta second

=== Fair Play Awards ===
- Lead: Andrew Taylor, Newfoundland and Labrador
- Second: Sanjay Bowry, British Columbia
- Third: Jamie Airut, Nunavut
- Skip: Will Mahoney, Yukon
- Coach: Benoit Forget, Quebec

=== ASHAM National Coaching Awards ===
- Mark Noseworthy, Newfoundland and Labrador

=== Joan Mead Legacy Awards ===
- Jonathan Schut, Prince Edward Island lead
