= 2012 Fort Wayne Summer Cash =

- Host city: Fort Wayne, Indiana
- Arena: Lutheran Health Sportscenter
- Dates: August 17–19
- Winner: (Ontario) Scott McDonald
- Curling club: London, Ontario
- Skip: Scott McDonald
- Third: Chris Jay
- Second: David Easter
- Lead: Jordan Moreau
- Finalist: (Massachusetts) Korey Dropkin

The 2012 Fort Wayne Summer Cash was held from August 17 to 19 at the Lutheran Health Sportscenter in Fort Wayne, Indiana as part of the 2012–13 Ontario Curling Tour. The event was held in a round robin format, with the purse for the event being USD$7,500.

== Teams ==
Skip	Third	Second	Lead	Locale
Ben Bevan	Tyler Sagan	Carter Adair	Derreck Veitch	Ajax, Ontario
Adam Gagné (fourth)	Doug Brewer	Trevor Brewer (skip)	Chris Gannon	Brockville, Ontario
Erika Brown	Debbie McCormick	Jessica Schultz	Ann Swisshelm	Madison, Wisconsin
Alexandra Carlson	Monica Walker	Kendall Moulton	Jordan Moulton	Minneapolis, Minnesota
Cory Christensen	Rebecca Funk	Anna Bauman	Sonja Bauman	Duluth, Minnesota
Gabrielle Coleman	Britt Rjanikov	Ann Drummie	Mary Shields	San Francisco, California
Korey Dropkin	Mark Fenner	Connor Hoge	Alex Fenson	Wayland, Massachusetts
Stephen Dropkin	Alex Leichter	Nate Clark	Matt Mielke	Boston, Massachusetts
Greg Eigner	Jeremy Roe	Pete McCormick	Richard Maskel	Fort Wayne, Indiana
Gerry Geurts	Katie Lindsay	Matt Holtwick	Tim Kelly	London, Ontario
Tyler George (fourth)	Mark Haluptzok (skip)	Ron Corn	Jon Chandler	Bemidji, Minnesota
Scott McDonald	Chris Jay	David Easter	Jordan Moreau	London, Ontario
Joyance Meechai	Casey Cucchiarelli	Tim Cucchiarelli	Courtney Shaw	(New York (state)) New York, New York
Ethan Meyers	Kyle Kakela	Trevor Host	Cameron Ross	Duluth, Minnesota
Nicholas Visnich	Jillian Walker	Alex Visnich	Julia DeBaggio	Pittsburgh, Pennsylvania

=== Round Robin Standings ===
Key
Teams to Playoffs
Teams to Tiebreaker

Pool A	W	L
(Wisconsin) Erika Brown	4	0
(Massachusetts) Korey Dropkin	3	1
(Ontario) Ben Bevan	2	2
(Minnesota) Cory Christensen	1	3
(Pennsylvania) Nicholas Visnich	0	4

Pool B	W	L
(Ontario) Scott McDonald	4	0
(Minnesota) Alexandra Carlson	2	2
(California) Gabrielle Coleman	2	2
(Ontario) Trevor Brewer	1	3
(Minnesota) Ethan Meyers	1	3

Pool C	W	L
(Minnesota) Mark Haluptzok	4	0
(Indiana) Greg Eigner	3	1
(New York (state)) Joyance Meechai	2	2
(Massachusetts) Stephen Dropkin	1	3
(Ontario) Gerry Geurts	0	4

=== Tiebreaker ===
Team	Final
(New York (state)) Joyance Meechai 🔨	6
(California) Gabrielle Coleman	5

=== Playoffs ===
Quarterfinals
(Wisconsin) Erika Brown	9
(New York (state)) Joyance Meechai	2
(Indiana) Greg Eigner	5
(Massachusetts) Korey Dropkin	6
(Ontario) Scott McDonald	9
(Ontario) Ben Bevan	4
(Minnesota) Mark Haluptzok	6
(Minnesota) Alexandra Carlson	5

Semifinals
(Wisconsin) Erika Brown	4
(Massachusetts) Korey Dropkin	7
(Ontario) Scott McDonald	9
(Minnesota) Mark Haluptzok	2

Final
(Massachusetts) Korey Dropkin	5
(Ontario) Scott McDonald	9
