= 2012 Moosehead Fall Open =

- Host city: Ottawa, Ontario
- Arena: Capital Curling Club
- Dates: September 19–23
- Men's winner: (Ontario) Ian MacAulay
- Curling club: Ottawa, Ontario
- Skip: Ian MacAulay
- Third: Steve Allen
- Second: Rick Allen
- Lead: Barry Conrad
- Finalist: (Ontario) Colin Dow
- Women's winner: (Ontario) Rachel Homan
- Curling club: Ottawa Curling Club, Ottawa
- Skip: Rachel Homan
- Third: Emma Miskew
- Second: Alison Kreviazuk
- Lead: Lisa Weagle
- Finalist: (Ontario) Lauren Mann

The 2012 Moosehead Fall Open was held from September 19 to 23 at the RCMP Curling Club in Ottawa as part of the 2012–13 Ontario Curling Tour. The event was held in a round robin format, with the purse for the men's event being CAD$16,000, and CAD $7,200 for the women's event.

== Men ==
=== Teams ===
Skip	Third	Second	Lead	Locale
Don Bowser	Jonathan Beuk	Matt Broder	TJ Connolly	Ottawa, Ontario
Adam Gagné (fourth)	Doug Brewer	Trevor Brewer (skip)	Chris Gannon	Brockville, Ontario
Clavin Christiansen	Gord Schade	Iain Wilson	Chris DeHaan	Ottawa, Ontario
Chris Gardner (fourth)	Mathew Camm	Brad Kidd	Bryan Cochrane (skip)	Ottawa, Ontario
Spencer Cooper	Willie Jeffries	Brian Vance	Steve Forrest	Ottawa, Ontario
Colin Dow	Brett Lyon-Hatcher	R.J Johnson	John Steski	Ottawa, Ontario
Mark Homan	Mike McLean	Brian Fleischhaker	Nathan Crawford	Ottawa, Ontario
Ron Hrycak	Jeff Guignard	Rob Fraser	Joey Madeglia	Ottawa, Ontario
Doug Johnston	Andrew Mikkelsen	Jody Royer	Bryan Benning	Ottawa, Ontario
Shane Latimer	Ritchie Gillan	Terry Scharf	Kevin Rathwell	Ottawa, Ontario
Chris Lewis	Ryan McCrady	Matt Haughn	Cole Lyon-Hatcher	Carp, Ontario
Ian MacAulay	Steve Allen	Rick Allen	Barry Conrad	Ottawa, Ontario
Jean-Michel Ménard	Martin Crête	Éric Sylvain	Philippe Ménard	Quebec City, Quebec
Matt Paul				Ottawa, Ontario
Howard Rajala	J.P Lachance	Chris Fulton	Paul Madden	Ottawa, Ontario
Gary Rowe	Mike Stachon	Jesse Ruppell	Rob Jennings	Ottawa, Ontario

=== Round Robin Standings ===
Key
Teams to Playoffs

Pool A	W	L
(Ontario) Colin Dow	2	1
(Ontario) Ian MacAulay	2	1
(Ontario) Ron Hrycak	1	2
(Ontario) Chris Lewis	1	2

Pool B	W	L
(Ontario) Spencer Cooper	3	0
(Ontario) Shane Latimer	2	1
(Ontario) Gary Rowe	1	2
(Ontario) Doug Johnston	0	3

Pool C	W	L
(Ontario) Clavin Christiansen	2	1
(Ontario) Howard Rajala	2	1
(Ontario) Mark Homan	2	1
(Ontario) Matt Paul	0	3

Pool D	W	L
(Ontario) Don Bowser	3	0
(Ontario) Bryan Cochrane	2	1
(Quebec) Jean-Michel Ménard	1	2
(Ontario) Doug Brewer	0	3

=== Playoffs ===
Quarterfinals
(Ontario) Ian MacAulay	4
(Ontario) Clavin Christiansen	2
(Ontario) Don Bowser	5
(Ontario) Shane Latimer	3
(Ontario) Howard Rajala	4
(Ontario) Colin Dow	5
(Ontario) Spencer Cooper	9
(Ontario) Bryan Cochrane	8

Semifinals
(Ontario) Ian MacAulay	9
(Ontario) Don Bowser	3
(Ontario) Colin Dow	6
(Ontario) Spencer Cooper	5

Final
(Ontario) Ian MacAulay	6
(Ontario) Colin Dow	5

== Women ==
=== Teams ===
Skip	Third	Second	Lead	Locale
Jennifer Harvey	Lisa Lalonde	Julie Bridger	Lynn Macdonell	Cornwall, Ontario
Rachel Homan	Emma Miskew	Alison Kreviazuk	Lisa Weagle	Ottawa, Ontario
Lauren Horton	Andrea Sinclair	Leigh Gustafson	Jessica Armstrong	Ottawa, Ontario
Anna Keller				Ottawa, Ontario
Barbara Kelly	Christine McCrady	Denise Hoekstra	Debbie Wall	Ottawa, Ontario
Chantal Lalonde	Shannon Harrington	Rachelle Vink	Tess Bobbie	London, Ontario
Lauren Mann	Patricia Hill	Jen Ahde	Jessica Barcauskas	Ottawa, Ontario
Cheryl McBain	Sheryl Dobenko	France Charette	Susan Goheen	Ottawa, Ontario
Katie Morrissey	Kiri Campbell	Lorelle Weiss	Cassandra de Groot	Ottawa, Ontario
Lesley Payne	Sharon Shynkaruk	Suzanne Miller	Katie Hickey	Ajax, Ontario
Allison Ross	Audree Dufresne	Brittany O'Rourke	Sasha Beauchamp	Montreal, Quebec
Rhonda Varnes	Tanya Rodrigues	Nicol McNiven	Breanne Merklinger	Ottawa, Ontario

=== Round Robin Standings ===
Key
Teams to Playoffs

Pool A	W	L
(Ontario) Rachel Homan	3	0
(Ontario) Lauren Mann	2	1
(Ontario) Barbara Kelly	1	2
(Ontario) Anna Keller	0	3

Pool B	W	L
(Ontario) Lesley Payne	2	1
(Ontario) Rhonda Varnes	2	1
(Ontario) Lauren Horton	1	2
(Ontario) Cheryl McBain	1	2

Pool C	W	L
(Quebec) Allison Ross	3	0
(Ontario) Katie Morrissey	1	2
(Ontario) Jennifer Harvey	1	2
(Ontario) Chantal Lalonde	1	2

=== Playoffs ===
Quarterfinals
(Ontario) Lauren Mann	W
(Ontario) Lesley Payne	L
(Ontario) Katie Morrissey	L
(Ontario) Rhonda Varnes	W

Semifinals
(Ontario) Lauren Mann	6
(Quebec) Allison Ross	4
(Ontario) Rachel Homan	8
(Ontario) Rhonda Varnes	2

Finals
(Ontario) Lauren Mann	0
(Ontario) Rachel Homan	6
