= 2016 CIS/CCA Curling Championships =

- Host city: Kelowna, British Columbia
- Arena: Kelowna Curling Club
- Dates: March 20–23
- Men's winner: (Ontario) Wilfrid Laurier Golden Hawks
- Skip: Aaron Squires
- Third: Richard Krell
- Second: Spencer Nuttall
- Lead: Fraser Reid
- Finalist: Alberta Golden Bears (Scoffin)
- Women's winner: Alberta Pandas
- Skip: Kelsey Rocque
- Third: Danielle Schmiemann
- Second: Taylor McDonald
- Lead: Taylore Theroux
- Finalist: (British Columbia) Thompson Rivers WolfPack (Brown)

The 2016 CIS/CCA Curling Championships are held from March 20 to 23 at the Kelowna Curling Club in Kelowna, British Columbia. The host university of the event is UBC Okanagan. The winning teams will also represent Canada at the 2017 Winter Universiade in Almaty, Kazakhstan.

== Men ==
=== Teams ===
The teams are listed as follows:

Team	Skip	Third	Second	Lead	Alternate	University
Alberta Golden Bears	Thomas Scoffin	Karsten Sturmay	Jason Ginter	Parker Konschuh	Tristan Steinke	University of Alberta
Brock Badgers	Eric Bradey	Jonah Mondloch	Ryan Brown	Jamie Waters	Ben Hughes	(Ontario) Brock University
Dalhousie Tigers	Matthew Manuel	Matthew Jackson	Chris MacRae	Nick Zachernuk	Aaron Raymond	(Nova Scotia) Dalhousie University
Saint Mary's Huskies	Adam Cocks	Adrian Anctil	Greg Rafuse	Scott Graham	Herman Suther	(Nova Scotia) Saint Mary's University
UBC Okanagan Heat	Justin Nillson	Colton Costa	Luke Cooke	Cam Mahler		(British Columbia) UBC Okanagan
Victoria Vikes	Corey Chester	Andrew Komlodi	Sanjay Bowry	Deryk Kuny		(British Columbia) University of Victoria
Waterloo Warriors	John Willsey	Matthew Allen	Conner Bradey	Edward Moore	James Harris	(Ontario) University of Waterloo
Wilfrid Laurier Golden Hawks	Aaron Squires	Richard Krell	Spencer Nuttall	Fraser Reid	Russell Cuddie	(Ontario) Wilfrid Laurier University

=== Round-robin standings ===
Final round-robin standings

Key
Teams to Playoffs

Team	Skip	W	L
Alberta Golden Bears	Thomas Scoffin	7	0
(Ontario) Wilfrid Laurier Golden Hawks	Aaron Squires	6	1
(British Columbia) Victoria Vikes	Corey Chester	4	3
(Ontario) Brock Badgers	Eric Bradey	4	3
(Nova Scotia) Dalhousie Tigers	Matthew Manuel	2	5
(British Columbia) UBC Okanagan Heat	Justin Nillson	2	5
(Ontario) Waterloo Warriors	John Willsey	2	5
(Nova Scotia) Saint Mary's Huskies	Adam Cocks	1	6

=== Playoffs ===
Semifinal
1	Alberta Golden Bears	9
4	(Ontario) Brock Badgers	3
2	(Ontario) Wilfrid Laurier Golden Hawks	6
3	(British Columbia) Victoria Vikes	4

Final
1	Alberta Golden Bears	4
2	(Ontario) Wilfrid Laurier Golden Hawks	7
Bronze-medal game
4	(Ontario) Brock Badgers	3
3	(British Columbia) Victoria Vikes	7

==== Semifinals ====
Wednesday, March 23, 9:00

Team	1	2	3	4	5	6	7	8	9	10	Final
Alberta Golden Bears (Scoffin)	2	1	0	4	0	0	0	2	X	X	9
(Ontario) Brock Badgers (Bradey)	0	0	1	0	0	1	1	0	X	X	3

Team	1	2	3	4	5	6	7	8	9	10	Final
(Ontario) Wilfrid Laurier Golden Hawks (Squires)	3	0	1	0	1	0	1	0	0	X	6
(British Columbia) Victoria Vikes (Chester)	0	1	0	0	0	1	0	0	2	X	4

==== Bronze-medal game ====
Wednesday, March 23, 14:30

Team	1	2	3	4	5	6	7	8	9	10	Final
(Ontario) Brock Badgers (Bradey)	0	0	1	0	0	1	0	1	0	X	3
(British Columbia) Victoria Vikes (Chester)	0	1	0	1	2	0	2	0	1	X	7

==== Final ====
Wednesday, March 23, 14:30

Team	1	2	3	4	5	6	7	8	9	10	Final
Alberta Golden Bears (Scoffin)	0	0	0	1	0	1	0	0	2	X	4
(Ontario) Wilfrid Laurier Golden Hawks (Squires)	0	1	1	0	2	0	2	1	0	X	7

== Women ==
=== Teams ===
The teams are listed as follows:

Team	Skip	Third	Second	Lead	Alternate	University
Alberta Pandas	Kelsey Rocque	Danielle Schmiemann	Taylor McDonald	Taylore Theroux	Kristen Streifel	University of Alberta
Brandon Bobcats	Janelle Vachon	Kaitlyn Payette	Hayley Surovy	Camille Lough	Kayla Hanke	(Manitoba) Brandon University
Brock Badgers	Terri Weeks	Joanna Francolini	Lauren Calvert	Samantha Morris	Jeanette Burnside	(Ontario) Brock University
Dalhousie Tigers	Kristin Clarke	Alicia Brine	Raquel Bachman	Hayley McCabe	Emily MacKenzie	(Nova Scotia) Dalhousie University
Guelph Gryphons	Jestyn Murphy	Breanna Rozon	Melanie Ebach	Jacinda Schieck	Natalie Hofmann	(Ontario) University of Guelph
Thompson Rivers WolfPack	Corryn Brown	Erin Pincott	Samantha Fisher	Ashley Nordin		(British Columbia) Thompson Rivers University
UNB Varsity Reds	Samantha Crook	Shelby Wilson	Jillian Crandall	Natalie Hearn	Erin Bethune	University of New Brunswick
Wilfrid Laurier Golden Hawks	Chelsea Brandwood	Brenda Holloway	Evie Fortier	Megan Arnold	Riley Sandham	(Ontario) Wilfrid Laurier University

=== Round-robin standings ===
Final round-robin standings

Key
Teams to Playoffs

Team	Skip	W	L
(Ontario) Guelph Gryphons	Jestyn Murphy	5	2
(British Columbia) Thompson Rivers WolfPack	Corryn Brown	5	2
(Nova Scotia) Dalhousie Tigers	Kristin Clarke	5	2
Alberta Pandas	Kelsey Rocque	5	2
(Manitoba) Brandon Bobcats	Janelle Vachon	3	4
(Ontario) Brock Badgers	Terri Weeks	3	4
(Ontario) Wilfrid Laurier Golden Hawks	Chelsea Brandwood	2	5
(New Brunswick) UNB Varsity Reds	Samantha Crook	0	7

=== Playoffs ===
Semifinal
1	(Ontario) Guelph Gryphons	6
4	Alberta Pandas	8
2	(British Columbia) Thompson Rivers WolfPack	7
3	(Nova Scotia) Dalhousie Tigers	4

Final
4	Alberta Golden Bears	5
2	(British Columbia) Thompson Rivers WolfPack	4
Bronze-medal game
1	(Ontario) Guelph Gryphons	11
3	(Nova Scotia) Dalhousie Tigers	7

==== Semifinals ====
Wednesday, March 23, 9:00

Team	1	2	3	4	5	6	7	8	9	10	Final
(Ontario) Guelph Gryphons (Murphy)	0	0	1	0	3	0	0	1	1	0	6
Alberta Pandas (Rocque)	0	1	0	3	0	1	0	0	0	3	8

Team	1	2	3	4	5	6	7	8	9	10	Final
(British Columbia) Thompson Rivers WolfPack (Brown)	1	0	2	0	0	2	1	0	1	X	7
(Nova Scotia) Dalhousie Tigers (Clarke)	0	1	0	1	1	0	0	1	0	X	4

==== Bronze-medal game ====
Wednesday, March 23, 14:30

Team	1	2	3	4	5	6	7	8	9	10	11	Final
(Ontario) Guelph Gryphons (Murphy)	0	0	0	1	0	1	0	2	2	1	4	11
(Nova Scotia) Dalhousie Tigers (Clarke)	0	2	2	0	1	0	2	0	0	0	0	7

==== Final ====
Wednesday, March 23, 14:30

Team	1	2	3	4	5	6	7	8	9	10	11	Final
Alberta Pandas (Rocque)	1	0	1	0	0	1	0	0	0	1	1	5
(British Columbia) Thompson Rivers WolfPack (Brown)	0	1	0	0	1	0	0	1	1	0	0	4
