= Guelph Women's Cashspiel =

The Guelph Women's Cashspiel was a bonspiel part of the women's Ontario Curling Tour. The event was an annual event held in November and took place at the Guelph Curling Club in Guelph, Ontario.

== Past Champions ==
Year	Winning skip	Runner up skip	Purse (CAD)
2005	(Ontario) Colleen Madonia		
2006	(Ontario) Karen Bell		
2007	(Ontario) Jennifer Spencer		
2008	(Ontario) Kelly Cochrane		
2010	(Ontario) Jennifer Spencer	(Ontario) Marika Bakewell	$6,000
2011	(Ontario) Janet McGhee	(Ontario) Tracy Horgan	$13,500
2012	(Ontario) Julie Reddick	(Ontario) Susan McKnight	$13,500
