= James T. S. Taylor =

American politician and activist (1840–1918)

- Born: James Thomas Sammons Taylor; January 14, 1840; Berryville, Virginia, U.S.
- Died: January 4, 1918 (aged 77); Charlottesville, Virginia, U.S.
- Resting place: Oakwood Cemetery; Charlottesville, Virginia, U.S.
- Occupations: Politician; shoemaker; writer
- Political party: Republican; Readjuster
- Spouse: Eliza Ann Delaney (m. 1865)
- Children: 9

James Thomas Sammons Taylor (January 14, 1840 – January 4, 1918) was an American politician and activist from Virginia. He was a delegate representing Albemarle County in the Virginia Constitutional Convention of 1868.

== Early life ==
James Thomas Sammons Taylor was born on January 14, 1840, in Berryville, Virginia, to Ellen (née Sammons) and Fairfax Taylor. His father was born a slave and bought his freedom and moved his family to Charlottesville. Taylor grew up in Charlottesville.

== Career ==
Taylor was taught the shoemaker trade by a white person and he followed his father in the trade. According to the University of Virginia, he ran away from Charlottesville to northern Virginia and Washington, D.C., in 1862 to avoid serving as a laborer for the Confederate cause. He enlisted on August 24, 1863, in company E of the 2nd United States Colored Infantry Regiment. He started as acting commissary sergeant and was promoted to the position in November 1863 and given the title starting from September 1, 1863. He was a newspaper correspondent during the war and wrote letters to the Anglo-American that detailed black soldiers' experiences and commented on racial injustice. In November 1864, he wrote a letter to President Abraham Lincoln describing his story before and during the war. In 1864, he was accused of stealing from commissary stores, but no regimental records reflect a trial and he returned to duty in March 1865. He was stationed for a time in Key West, Florida. He was mustered out on January 5, 1866, and then returned to Virginia.

Taylor and Clifton L. Thompson were the two delegates elected on October 22, 1867, to represent Albemarle County in the Virginia Constitutional Convention of 1868. His father opposed his election as a delegate believing that white moderate Republicans would be more effective at arguing for African Americans. Taylor advocated for civil and black rights at the convention. He was a member of the committees on the basis of representation and apportionment and on prisons and the prevention and punishment of crime. He introduced a resolution that would allow former slaves to sue for wages that were owed for work done for their owners after the Civil War's end. It was not adopted.

Taylor was nominated by the Republican Party in 1868 to serve in the Virginia House of Delegates, but only received 43% of the vote. He ran again for the legislature the following year, but lost again. He only received 105 votes in that election. In April 1870, he was appointed by President Ulysses S. Grant as postmaster at the University of Virginia. He was later selected as commissioner and judge of elections. By 1881, he supported the Readjuster Party and remained affiliated with the Republican Party. He supported the Readjuster Party's reforms in poll taxes and investments in public education. In the 1882 election, as a poll worker for John Sergeant Wise, he was accused of helping ineligible voters cast ballots. He also bought and sold property in Charlottesville.

== Personal life ==
Taylor married Eliza Ann Delaney, of Key West and daughter of Bahamian immigrants, on April 18, 1865. They had nine children. He was a sexton of Christ Church. Taylor wrote an agent of the Bureau of Refugees, Freedman, and Abandoned Lands to ask for money owed him from the army. He received US$1,000. In 1872, he purchased more than an acre of his father's house in Charlottesville and built a two-story brick house.

Taylor died of pneumonia on January 4, 1918, at his home on Taylor Street in Charlottesville. He was buried in Oakwood Cemetery in Charlottesville.

== Legacy ==
In October 2025, a highway marker in Charlottesville was created in memory of Taylor.
