= Co-operators Cup =

The Co-operators Cup (also known as the Markdale Cashspiel) was a bonspiel part of the men's Ontario Curling Tour. The event was an annual event held in November and took place at the Markdale Curling Club in Markdale, Ontario.

== Past Champions ==
Year	Winning skip	Runner up skip	Purse (CAD)
2011	(Ontario) Willie MacPherson	(Ontario) Al Hutchinson	$8,000
2012	(Ontario) Al Hutchinson	(Ontario) Dion Dumontelle	$12,400
2013	(Ontario) Joey Rettinger	(Ontario) Robbie Gordon	$12,400
