= 2012 Ingersoll Clash =

- Host city: Ingersoll, Ontario
- Arena: Ingersoll & District Curling Club
- Dates: September 28–30
- Men's winner: (Ontario) Terry Corbin
- Curling club: Toronto, Ontario
- Skip: Terry Corbin
- Third: Dave Pallen
- Second: Dave Ellis
- Lead: Ted Anderson
- Finalist: (Ontario) Brett Dekoning
- Women's winner: (Ontario) Chantal Lalonde
- Curling club: London, Ontario
- Skip: Chantal Lalonde
- Third: Shannon Harrington
- Second: Rachelle Vink
- Lead: Tess Bobbie
- Finalist: (Ontario) Susan McKnight

The 2012 Ingersoll Clash was held from September 28 to 30 at the Ingersoll & District Curling Club in Ingersoll, Ontario, as part of the 2012–13 Ontario Curling Tour. The men's and women's events were held in a round robin format. The purse for the men's event were CAD$10,500, and CAD $6,000 for the women's event.

== Men ==
=== Teams ===
Skip	Third	Second	Lead	Locale
Mike Aprile	Scott McGregor	Scott Hindle	Shawn Cottrill	Listowel, Ontario
Bob Armstrong	Curtis Cassidy	David Heinrichs	Darryl Nodwell	Ingersoll, Ontario
Sean Aune	Ian Dickie	Tyler Stewart	Graham Carr	Toronto, Ontario
Terry Bushell	Scott Garton	Jeff Robson	Andrew Bushell	Ingersoll, Ontario
Brandon Corbett	Derek Corbett			(New York (state)) Rochester, New York
Terry Corbin	Dave Pallen	Dave Ellis	Ted Anderson	Toronto, Ontario
Brett Dekoning	Matt Mapletoft	Scott Brandon	Chris Jay	Chatham, Ontario
Connor Duhaime	Evan Lilly	Tyler Jones	Matt Hardman	Haliburton, Ontario
Joe Fanset	Dale Fanset			Ingersoll, Ontario
Brad Hertner	Sean Bryant	Blair Willert	Jess Bechard	Brantford, Ontario
Rayad Husain	Rik Aikman	Kris Keasowski	Jason Chang	Brampton, Ontario
Josh Johnston	Brian Chick	Matt Lowe	Ryan Parker	Toronto, Ontario
Joe Miller	Tom Worth	Brian Mathews	Geoff Scott	Toronto, Ontario
Darryl Prebble	Denis Belanger	Mark Koivula	Dennis Lemon	Toronto, Ontario
Michael Shepherd	Jordan Keon	Curtis Samoy	Michael Keon	Richmond Hill, Ontario
George White	Scott Buchan	Matt Ignor	Graham Rae	Stratford, Ontario

=== Round-robin standings ===
Key
Teams to Playoffs

Pool A	W	L
(Ontario) Brett Dekoning	3	0
(Ontario) Mike Aprile	2	1
(Ontario) George White	1	2
(Ontario) Joe Miller	0	3

Pool B	W	L
(Ontario) Bob Armstrong	3	0
(New York (state)) Brandon Corbett	2	1
(Ontario) Brad Hertner	1	2
(Ontario) Terry Bushell	0	3

Pool C	W	L
(Ontario) Terry Corbin	2	1
(Ontario) Sean Aune	2	1
(Ontario) Josh Johnston	1	2
(Ontario) Connor Duhaime	1	2

Pool D	W	L
(Ontario) Michael Shepherd	2	1
(Ontario) Rayad Husain	2	1
(Ontario) Joe Fanset	1	2
(Ontario) Darryl Prebble	1	2

=== Playoffs ===
Quarterfinals
(Ontario) Brett Dekoning	5
(Ontario) Mike Aprile	3
(Ontario) Michael Shepherd	9
(Ontario) Sean Aune	0
(Ontario) Bob Armstrong	8
(Ontario) Rayad Husain	2
(Ontario) Terry Corbin	7
(New York (state)) Brandon Corbett	5

Semifinals
(Ontario) Brett Dekoning	8
(Ontario) Michael Shepherd	5
(Ontario) Bob Armstrong	4
(Ontario) Terry Corbin	5

Final
(Ontario) Brett Dekoning	1
(Ontario) Terry Corbin	4

== Women ==
=== Teams ===
Skip	Third	Second	Lead	Locale
Ruth Alexander				London, Ontario
Melanie DeSchutter	Charlene Haluk-McMahon	Rachel Faust		San Francisco, California
Jacqueline Harrison	Kimberly Tuck	Susan Froud	Heather Nicol	Waterdown, Ontario
Bethany Heinrichs	Sandra Cowell	Jennie Hertner	Jen Chapman	Ilderton, Ontario
Chantal Lalonde	Shannon Harrington	Rachelle Vink	Tess Bobbie	London, Ontario
Susan McKnight	Catherine Kaino	Karen Rowsell	Jordan Ariss	Uxbridge, Ontario
Angie Melaney	Dominique Lascelles	Marteen Lorti	Jennifer Rosborough	Lakefield, Ontario
Ashley Waye	Denise Donovan	Naomi Visanji	MArnie Loeb	Toronto, Ontario

=== Round-robin standings ===
Key
Teams to Playoffs

Pool A	W	L
(Ontario) Chantal Lalonde	3	0
(Ontario) Susan McKnight	1	2
(Ontario) Ashley Waye	1	2
(Ontario) Ruth Alexander	1	2

Pool B	W	L
(Ontario) Bethany Heinrichs	2	1
(Ontario) Angie Melaney	2	1
(Ontario) Melanie DeSchutter	1	2
(Ontario) Jacqueline Harrison	1	2

=== Playoffs ===
Semifinal		Final
(Ontario) Chantal Lalonde	9
(Ontario) Bethany Heinrichs	2	(Ontario) Chantal Lalonde	4
(Ontario) Angie Melaney	4	(Ontario) Susan McKnight	3
(Ontario) Susan McKnight	7
