= Ottawa Tankard Tune-Up =

The Ottawa Tankard Tune-Up was a bonspiel (curling tournament) that was part of the men's and women's Ontario Curling Tour. The event was introduced in 2012 and was held in November, at the Ottawa Curling Club in Ottawa, Ontario. The event was designed to prepare local teams for the zone/regional playdowns for the Ontario Tankard, Ontario Scotties Tournament of Hearts, Quebec Men's Provincial Curling Championship and the Quebec Scotties Tournament of Hearts.

The 2012 event marked the first Tour event to be played at the Ottawa Curling Club since the John Shea Insurance Canada Cup Qualifier in 2008.

The event featured a men's, women's and open draw. Only the men's and women's events are Ontario Curling Tour events.

The 2012 event saw 12 men's and 12 women's teams divided into 3 pools of 4. The men's event saw just one team from outside Ottawa (Jean-Francois Royer from Mount Royal, Quebec), while the women's event had 3 teams from outside the city (2 from Southern Ontario and 1 from Quebec).

The total purse for the men's and women's event was $6,400 in 2012 with the winning teams earning $2000. Unlike most OCT events, no CTRS points are available for this tournament.

== Men's Champions ==
Year	Winning team	Club	Runner up team	Club	Purse (CAD)
2012	Ian MacAulay, Steve Allen, Rick Allen, Barry Conrad	(Ontario) Ottawa CC (Ottawa, ON)	Shane Latimer, Ritchie Gillan, Terry Scharf, Kevin Rathwell	(Ontario) Ottawa CC (Ottawa, ON)	$6,400

== Women's Champions ==
Year	Winning team	Club	Runner up team	Club	Purse (CAD)
2012	Jaimee Gardner, Allison Farrell, Kim Brown, Trish Scharf	(Ontario) City View CC (Nepean, ON)	Allison Ross, Audree Dufresne, Brittany O'Rourke, Sasha Beauchamp	(Quebec) Glenmore CC (Dollard-des-Ormeaux, QC)	$6,400
