= Scugog Cup =

The Scugog Cup was a bonspiel part of the men's Ontario Curling Tour. The event was an annual event held in November and takes place at the Port Perry Community Curling Club in Port Perry, Ontario. It was last held in 2015.

== Past Champions ==
Year	Winning skip	Runner up skip	Purse (CAD)
2007	(Ontario) Bill Harrison		
2008	(Ontario) Kent Beddows		
2010	(Ontario) Mike McLean	(Ontario) Norm McGlaughlin	$13,050
2011	(Ontario) Wayne Warren	(Ontario) Jeff Clark	$8,000
2012	(Ontario) Connor Duhaime	(Ontario) Bryan Cochrane	$8,000
2013	(Ontario) Mark Kean	(Ontario) Tom Worth	$8,000
2014	(Ontario) Rob Houston	(Ontario) Pat Ferris	$8,000
2015	(Ontario) Mike McLean	(Ontario) Richard Krell	$8,000
