= North Key Construction Men's Open =

The North Key Construction Men's Open (also known as the Napanee Cash Spiel) was a bonspiel part of the men's Ontario Curling Tour. The event was held at the Napanee Curling Club in Napanee, Ontario.

== Past Champions ==
Year	Winning skip	Runner up skip	Purse (CAD)
2012	(Ontario) Dayna Deruelle	(Ontario) Jonathan Beuk	$10,000
