= St. Thomas Curling Classic =

Curling event in Ontario, Canada

The St. Thomas Curling Classic (previously Roy Inch & Sons Service Experts Classic and the Arctic Snowplows Classic before 2014) is a bonspiel, part of the men's Ontario Curling Tour. The event is held in October and takes place at the St. Thomas Curling Club in St. Thomas, Ontario.

In the past, the event has been open to both men's and women's teams. In 2013, Sherry Middaugh's team made it all the way to the final. That year, 4 of the 16 teams entered were women's rinks.

== Past Champions ==
Year	Winning skip	Runner up skip	Purse (CAD)
2006	(Ontario) Rob Nixon		
2007	(Ontario) Andrew Fairfull		
2008	(Ontario) Axel Larsen		
2010	(Ontario) Jim Lyle	(Ontario) Garth Mitchell	$9,800
2011	(Ontario) Mike Anderson	(Ontario) Mike Jakubo	$12,000
2012	(Ontario) Bowie Abbis-Mills	(Ontario) Bruce Park	$12,000
2013	(Ontario) Mike Jakubo	(Ontario) Sherry Middaugh	$9,000
2014	(United States) Brandon Corbett	(Ontario) Terry Corbin	$9,000
2015	Cancelled		
2016	(Ontario) Aaron Squires	(Ontario) Daryl Shane	$7,600
2017–2021	Not held		
2022	(Ontario) John Willsey	(New Brunswick) James Grattan	$11,000
