= Chatham Granite Cash Spiel =

The Chatham Granite Cash Spiel was an annual bonspiel on the men's Ontario Curling Tour. It was held annually in November, at the Chatham Granite Club in Chatham, Ontario. Women's teams have participated in the past.

== Past champions ==
Year	Winning skip	Runner up skip	Purse (CAD)
2011	(Ontario) Tom Pruliere	(Ontario) Mike Aprile	$8,000
2012	(Ontario) Bowie Abbis-Mills	(Ontario) Dale Kelly	$7,500
2013	(Ontario) Phil Daniel	(Ontario) Craig Van Ymeren	$7,500
2014	(Ontario) Brian Glover	(Ontario) Jim Brackett	$8,000
2015	(Ontario) Phil Daniel	(Ontario) Dale Kelly	$8,000
