= Elora Cash Spiel =

Canadian curling competition

The Elora Cash Spiel was an annual bonspiel on the men's and women's Ontario Curling Tour. It was held annually in November, at the Elora Curling Club in Elora, Ontario. The men's event was discontinued after 2012 and the women's after 2013.

== Past Men's Champions ==
Year	Winning skip	Runner up skip	Purse (CAD)
2010	(Ontario) Andrew McGaugh	(Ontario) Robert Rumfeldt	$9,425
2011	(Ontario) Dayna Deruelle	(Ontario) Terry Corbin	$8,000
2012	(Ontario) Nick Rizzo	(Ontario) Mike Bryson	$6,000

== Past Women's Champions ==
Year	Winning skip	Runner up skip	Purse (CAD)
2012	(Ontario) Kristy Russell	(Ontario) Kendra Lilly	$3,000
2013	(Ontario) Jaimee Gardner	(Ontario) Marilyn Bodogh	$3,000
