= 2014 CIS/CCA Curling Championships =

- Host city: Regina, Saskatchewan
- Arena: Callie Curling Club
- Dates: March 19–23
- Men's winner: Manitoba Bisons
- Skip: Matt Dunstone
- Third: Dan Grant
- Second: Chris Gallant
- Lead: Jim Coleman
- Finalist: Alberta Golden Bears (Brendan Bottcher)
- Women's winner: (Ontario) Carleton Ravens
- Skip: Jamie Sinclair
- Third: Lauren Horton
- Second: Lynn Kreviazuk
- Lead: Jessica Armstrong
- Finalist: Alberta Pandas (Kelsey Rocque)

The 2014 CIS/CCA Curling Championships was held from March 19 to 23 at the Callie Curling Club in Regina, Saskatchewan. The host university of the event was the University of Regina. The winners represented Canada at the 2015 Winter Universiade in Granada, Spain.

== Men ==
=== Teams ===
The teams are listed as follows:

Team	Skip	Third	Second	Lead	Alternate(s)	Coach	University
Brock Badgers	Scott Brandon	Jonah Mondloch	Blake Sandham	Jamie Waters	Mike Idzenga; Ryan Brown	Matt Wilkinson	(Ontario) Brock University
Wilfrid Laurier Golden Hawks	Aaron Squires	Richard Krell	Spencer Nuttall	Fraser Reid	John Gabel	Gary Crossley	(Ontario) Wilfrid Laurier University
Toronto Varsity Blues	Evan Lilly	Jack Lindsay	Richard Seto	Geoff Elliott	Scott Eckford	Scott Jenkins	(Ontario) University of Toronto
Regina Cougars	Catlin Schneider	Mathew Ring	Rory McCusker	Brendan Ryan	David Haines	Brian McCusker	(Saskatchewan) University of Regina
Manitoba Bisons	Matt Dunstone	Dan Grant	Chris Gallant	Jim Coleman	Jordan Smith	Scott Grant	University of Manitoba
Alberta Golden Bears	Brendan Bottcher	Evan Asmussen	Brad Thiessen	Landon Bucholz	Thomas Scoffin	Rob Krepps	University of Alberta
Saint Mary's Huskies	Scott Babin	Alex Rafuse	Greg Rafuse	Alex MacNeil		Bill Fletcher	(Nova Scotia) Saint Mary's University
Memorial Sea-Hawks	Colin Thomas	Cory Schuh	Chris Ford	Spencer Wicks		Jeff Thomas	(Newfoundland and Labrador) Memorial University of Newfoundland

=== Round-robin standings ===
Final round-robin standings

Key
Teams to Playoffs

Team	Skip	W	L
Manitoba Bisons	Matt Dunstone	6	1
(Ontario) Wilfrid Laurier Golden Hawks	Aaron Squires	6	1
Alberta Golden Bears	Brendan Bottcher	4	3
(Newfoundland and Labrador) Memorial Sea-Hawks	Colin Thomas	3	4
(Nova Scotia) Saint Mary's Huskies	Scott Babin	3	4
(Saskatchewan) Regina Cougars	Catlin Schneider	2	5
(Ontario) Brock Badgers	Scott Brandon	2	5
(Ontario) Toronto Varsity Blues	Evan Lilly	2	5

=== Playoffs ===
Semifinal			Final
			1	Manitoba Bisons	7
2	(Ontario) Wilfrid Laurier Golden Hawks	4	3	Alberta Golden Bears	5
3	Alberta Golden Bears	9

==== Semifinal ====
Saturday, March 23, 7:00 pm

Sheet 10	1	2	3	4	5	6	7	8	9	10	Final
(Ontario) Wilfrid Laurier Golden Hawks (Squires) 🔨	3	0	0	0	0	0	0	1	X	X	4
Alberta Golden Bears (Bottcher)	0	2	2	1	2	1	1	0	X	X	9

==== Final ====
Sunday, March 24, 5:00 pm

Sheet 9	1	2	3	4	5	6	7	8	9	10	11	Final
Manitoba Bisons (Dunstone) 🔨	0	0	2	0	0	2	0	0	0	1	2	7
Alberta Golden Bears (Bottcher)	0	0	0	2	1	0	1	1	0	0	0	5

== Women ==
=== Teams ===
The teams are listed as follows:

Team	Skip	Third	Second	Lead	Alternate(s)	Coach	University
UNB Varsity Reds	Jennifer Armstrong	Jaclyn Crandall	Shelby Wilson	Darie Tardiff	Katelyn Kelly	Gary Wilson	University of New Brunswick
Toronto Varsity Blues	Danielle Bourque	Nicole Seto	Britney Prevost	Deanna Caldwell	Caitlin Elliott; Laura Campbell	Scott Jenkins	(Ontario) University of Toronto
Thompson Rivers WolfPack	Corryn Brown	Erin Pincott	Samantha Fisher	Ashley Nordin		Ken Brown	(British Columbia) Thompson Rivers University
Wilfrid Laurier Golden Hawks	Carly Howard	Kerilynn Mathers	Evangeline Fortier	Cheryl Kreviazuk	Chelsea Brandwood	Maurice Wilson	(Ontario) Wilfrid Laurier University
Alberta Pandas	Kelsey Rocque	Keely Brown	Taylor McDonald	Claire Tully	Alison Kotylak	Garry Coderre	University of Alberta
Regina Cougars	Lorraine Schneider	Callan Hamon	Tessa Vibe	Ashley Desjardins	Katherine Michaluk	Jamie Schneider	(Saskatchewan) University of Regina
UPEI Panthers	Veronica Smith	Jane DiCarlo	Emily Gray	Aleya Quilty		Paul Smith	University of Prince Edward Island
Carleton Ravens	Jamie Sinclair	Lauren Horton	Lynn Kreviazuk	Jessica Armstrong	Sarah Armstrong	Doug Kreviazuk	(Ontario) Carleton University

=== Round-robin standings ===
Final round-robin standings

Key
Teams to Playoffs

Team	Skip	W	L
Alberta Pandas	Kelsey Rocque	6	1
(Ontario) Carleton Ravens	Jamie Sinclair	5	2
(Ontario) Wilfrid Laurier Golden Hawks	Carly Howard	5	2
(British Columbia) Thompson Rivers WolfPack	Corryn Brown	4	3
(Ontario) Toronto Varsity Blues	Danielle Bourque	3	4
(Saskatchewan) Regina Cougars	Lorraine Schneider	2	5
(Prince Edward Island) UPEI Panthers	Veronica Smith	2	5
(New Brunswick) UNB Varsity Reds	Jennifer Armstrong	1	6

=== Playoffs ===
Semifinal			Final
			1	Alberta Pandas	4
2	(Ontario) Carleton Ravens	6	2	(Ontario) Carleton Ravens	9
3	(Ontario) Wilfrid Laurier Golden Hawks	3

==== Semifinal ====
Saturday, March 23, 7:00 pm

Sheet 11	1	2	3	4	5	6	7	8	9	10	Final
(Ontario) Carleton Ravens (Sinclair)	0	0	2	0	0	0	0	3	1	X	6
(Ontario) Wilfrid Laurier Golden Hawks (Howard) 🔨	1	0	0	1	0	0	1	0	0	X	3

==== Final ====
Sunday, March 24, 2:00 pm

Sheet 9	1	2	3	4	5	6	7	8	9	10	Final
Alberta Pandas (Rocque) 🔨	0	0	0	0	1	0	2	1	0	X	4
(Ontario) Carleton Ravens (Sinclair)	1	1	2	0	0	2	0	0	3	X	9
