= Fort Wayne Summer Cash Spiel =

Former World Curling Tour event

The Fort Wayne Summer Cash Spiel was a bonspiel, or curling tournament, that took place at the Lutheran Health Sportscenter in Fort Wayne, Indiana. The tournament was held in a round robin format. The tournament has been held as part of the men's and women's Ontario Curling Tour, and was part of the World Curling Tour in 2013. It has not been run since.

== Past champions ==
=== Men ===
Year	Winning skip	Runner up skip	Purse (USD)
2013	(Ohio) Matt Paul	(Ontario) Mike Aprile	3,000

=== Women ===
Year	Winning skip	Runner up skip	Purse (USD)
2013	(China) Wang Bingyu	(China) Jiang Yilun	6,000

=== Mixed ===
Year	Winning skip	Runner up skip	Purse (USD)
2011	(Massachusetts) Stephen Dropkin	(Wisconsin) Craig Brown	$7,500
2012	(Ontario) Scott McDonald	(Massachusetts) Korey Dropkin	$7,500
