= Carleton Heights Women's Cash =

The Carleton Heights Women's Cash was an annual bonspiel on the women's Ontario Curling Tour. It is held annually at the beginning of September at the Carleton Heights Curling Club in Ottawa, Ontario.

== Past champions ==
Year	Winning skip	Runner up skip	Purse (CAD)
2006	(Ontario) Rachel Homan	(Ontario) Erin Morrissey	
2007	(Ontario) Jennifer Day		
2008	(Ontario) Tracy Samaan		
2011	(Ontario) Lauren Horton	(Ontario) Cheryl McBain	$3,000
2012	(Ontario) Lauren Horton	(Ontario) Katie Morrissey	$2,700
2013	(Ontario) Katie Morrissey	(Ontario) Samantha Peters	$1,500
2014	(Quebec) Lauren Mann	(Ontario) Barb Willemsen	$1,500
2015	(Ontario) Rhonda Varnes	(Ontario) Erin Morrissey	$3,000
2016	(Ontario) Janet McGhee	(Ontario) Erin Macaulay	$3,000
