= Clifton L. Thompson =

American politician (1825–1900)

Member of the Virginia House of Delegates from the Hanover district
- In office October 5, 1869 – December 5, 1871
- Preceded by: T.J. Woolridge
- Succeeded by: C.E. Thompson

Personal details
- Born: 1825 Albemarle County, Virginia
- Died: after 1883
- Party: Republican
- Spouse(s): Pamela E. Marshall; Mary M. Arehart
- Children: sons, daughters, Mattie Bell Thompson 1879 to 1962
- Profession: merchant, politician

Clifton L. Thompson (1825 – December 14, 1900), a Virginia merchant and Republican politician after the American Civil War, served in the Virginia Constitutional Convention of 1868 representing Albemarle County, Virginia and one term in the Virginia House of Delegates representing Hanover County, Virginia, then worked as a federal tax collector and tobacco inspector in central Virginia until shortly before his death.

== Early and family life ==
Born in 1825 in Virginia to the former Avis O. Bowen and her husband, William A. Thompson.

C. L. Thompson married Pamela E. Marshall (1835-), daughter of Coleman Marshall in Orange, Virginia on November 3, 1845. They lived in Charlottesville, Albemarle County, in 1850 and in 1860 in its Fredericksville Parish. They had daughters Ann C. Thompson (b.1847), Frances Thompson (b.1848 and dying before 1860) and Lizzie Thompson (1855-) and sons John C. Thompson (1850-) and William T. Thompson (b. 1853). After Pamela Marshall Thompson's death, the 51 year old widower remarried in October 1876, in Middlebrook, Augusta County, Virginia to 28 year old Mary M. Arehart.

== Career ==
Thompson listed his occupation as "merchant" or "retired merchant" on federal census forms before he gained a federal patronage job after the American Civil War. Before the war, he advertised selling tobacco products in local Albemarle County newspapers.

His activities during American Civil War are unclear, particularly his relation to private George Thompson, who joined the 19th Virginia Infantry recruited from Albemarle County and who became the local militia's first fatality during the First Battle of Bull Run. Charlottesville served as a Confederate hospital town during most of the conflict, and only one skirmish occurred in its vicinity.

By the time of Virginia's first postwar election, Thompson was a Radical Republican. Albemarle County voters elected Thompson and African-American James T. S. Taylor (son of Fairfax Taylor who demanded the right for African Americans to sit on juries and attend the University of Virginia) as Republicans to represent them at the Virginia Constitutional Convention of 1868. They defeated conservatives Judge Alexander Rives (who had previously been willing to work with the Republicans) and farmer William H. Southall (brother of J.C. Southall, editor of a local newspaper, the Chronicle, and whose wealth had increased during the war), as well as merchant Thomas W. Savage (a former abolitionist whom Union military authorities soon appointed mayor). However, neither Thompson nor Taylor proved outspoken at that assembly.

After Virginia voters adopted that Constitution, Hanover County voters elected Thompson and W. R. Winn to represent them at the Virginia House of Delegates in 1869, and Thompson served a single term (Winn would also represent Hanover County in 1874-1875). In 1879 and 1883 C. L. Thompson was a federal tobacco inspector based in Charlottesville, which could be a patronage position consistent with his Republican politics.
