= Capital Curling Fall Open =

Bonspiel on the men's Ontario Curling Tour

The Capital Curling Fall Open is an annual bonspiel on the men's Ontario Curling Tour, and is part of the Capital Curling series. It is held annually in September at the RCMP Curling Club in Ottawa, Ontario. A women's event was held from 2010 to 2013, and women have participated in the men's event in other years.

== Past names ==
- OVCT RCMP Fall Open (2001–2004)
- RCMP Fall Open (2005–2010)
- Moosehead Fall Open (2011–2012)
- Capital Curling Fall Open (2013–2016)
- Moosehead Fall Open (2017–2019)
- Capital Curling Fall Open (2023–present)

== Past Champions ==
=== Men ===
After going 3–0 in the women's draw in 2004, Anne Merklinger and her rink of Theresa Breen, Susan Froud and Audrey Reddick entered the open playoffs, and won that event too.

| Year | Winning skip | Runner up skip | Purse (CAD) |
|---|---|---|---|
| 2001 | (Ontario) Ron Diguer | (Ontario) Bryan Cochrane | |
| 2003 | (Ontario) Bryan Cochrane | (Quebec) Don Westphal | $15,000 |
| 2004 | (Ontario) Anne Merklinger | (Ontario) Calvin Christiansen | $14,000 |
| 2005 | (Quebec) Pierre Charette | (Ontario) Bryan Cochrane | $12,700 |
| 2006 | (Ontario) Bryan Cochrane | (Ontario) Greg Richardson | $12,000 |
| 2007 | (Ontario) Howard Rajala | (Ontario) Bryan Cochrane | |
| 2008 | (Ontario) Howard Rajala | | $15,000 |
| 2010 | (Quebec) Martin Ferland | (Ontario) Chris Gardner | $11,600 |
| 2011 | (Ontario) Chris Gardner | (Quebec) Philippe Lemay | $13,000 |
| 2012 | (Ontario) Ian MacAulay | (Ontario) Colin Dow | $16,000 |
| 2013 | (Ontario) Ian MacAulay | (Ontario) Howard Rajala | $10,400 |
| 2014 | (Ontario) Brian Lewis | (Ontario) Don Bowser | $10,400 |
| 2015 | (Ontario) Colin Dow | (Ontario) Howard Rajala | $10,400 |
| 2016 | (Quebec) Mike Fournier | (Ontario) Greg Balsdon | $8,000 |
| 2017 | (Quebec) Jean-Michel Ménard | (Ontario) Mark Kean | $8,000 |
| 2019 | (Japan) Tsuyoshi Yamaguchi | (Quebec) Mike Fournier | $11,600 |
| 2021 | (Switzerland) Yves Stocker | (Quebec) Mike Fournier | $10,400 |
| 2022 | (Ontario) Jason Camm | (Quebec) Ted Butler | $10,400 |
| 2023 | (Ontario) Jayden King | (Ontario) J. P. Lachance | $10,400 |
| 2024 | (Ontario) Jacob Lamb | (Ontario) Matthew Dupuis | $6,600 |
| 2025 | (South Korea) Kim Soo-hyuk | (South Korea) Lee Jae-beom | $10,400 |
| 2026 | (Ontario) Sandy MacEwan | (Ontario) Billy Woods | $3,600 |

=== Women ===
| Year | Winning skip | Runner up skip | Purse (CAD) |
|---|---|---|---|
| 2010 | (Ontario) Jamie Sinclair | (Ontario) Katie Morrissey | $7,200 |
| 2011 | (Ontario) Jenn Hanna | (Ontario) Laura Payne | $7,200 |
| 2012 | (Ontario) Rachel Homan | (Ontario) Lauren Mann | $7,200 |
| 2013 | (Ontario) Rachel Homan | (Ontario) Jenn Hanna | $7,200 |

== Past Open event Champions ==
(Open to both genders)

| Year | Winning skip | Runner up skip | Purse (CAD) |
|---|---|---|---|
| 2016 | (Ontario) Stephen Watson | (Quebec) Mario Deschatels | $6,000 |
| 2017 | (Ontario) Sierra Sutherland | (Quebec) Guy Charette | $6,000 |
| 2021 | (Quebec) Ted Butler | (Quebec) Jean-Michel Ménard | $7,700 |
