= Comco Cash Spiel =

COMCO Cash Spiel
- Established: 2004
- Host city: Stroud, Ontario
- Arena: Stroud Curling Club
- Purse: $12,550
- 2026 champion: (United States) Scott Dunnam

The COMCO Cash Spiel is a bonspiel that is part of the men's and women's Ontario Curling Tour. The event is an annual event held in November and takes place at the Stroud Curling Club in Stroud, Ontario. The bonspiel is open to both men's and women's teams.

== Past Champions ==
Year	Winning skip	Runner up skip	Purse (CAD)
2004	(Ontario) Rob Lipsett		
2005	(Ontario) Al Hutchinson		
2006	(Ontario) Daryl Shane		
2007	(Ontario) Cory Heggestad		
2008	(Ontario) Al Corbeil		
2010	(Ontario) Cory Heggestad	(Ontario) Scott McPherson	$13,050
2011	(Ontario) Cory Heggestad	(Ontario) Chris Wimmer	$13,500
2012	(Ontario) Pat Ferris	(Ontario) Darryl Prebble	$13,500
2013	(Ontario) Darryl Prebble	(Ontario) Pat Ferris	$13,500
2014	(Ontario) Chris Wimmer	(Ontario) Michael Shepherd	$13,500
2015	(Ontario) Dayna Deruelle	(Ontario) Cory Heggestad	$14,400
2016	(Ontario) Dayna Deruelle	(Ontario) Jon St. Denis	$13,200
2017	(Ontario) John Steski	(Ontario) Cory Heggestad	$12,500
2018	(Ontario) Steve Allen	(Ontario) John Willsey	$12,000
2019	(Ontario) Richard Krell	(Ontario) Cory Heggestad	$12,000
2022	(Ontario) Pat Ferris	(Ontario) Dayna Deruelle	$11,000
2023	(Ontario) Sam Mooibroek	(Ontario) Dayna Deruelle	$8,400
2024	(South Korea) Park Jong-duk	(Ontario) Sam Steep	$12,000
2025	(Ontario) Jordan McNamara	(Ontario) Weston Oryniak	$12,000
2026	(United States) Scott Dunnam	(Ontario) Daniel Hocevar	$12,550
