= G. Clifton Thompson =

George Clifton Thompson (August 8, 1913 – June 3, 2008) was a president of the International Curling Federation. Born in Brandon, Manitoba, he started curling when he was fifteen.

Thompson was President of the Kapuskasing Curling Club, a member of the Northern Ontario School committee and chairman of School Boys Curling Committee (now Junior curling). As a vice-president of the Canadian Curling Association he was involved in finding a new sponsor for the Brier and new formats for television coverage of curling events. As president of the Canadian Curling Association, Thompson took part in relocating its headquarters from Winnipeg to Ottawa and helped to establish scholarships for young curlers. Thompson was a life member of the Canadian Curling Association, a member of the Governor General’s Curling Club, a recipient of the Canadian Curling Hall of Fame’s Builder’s Award and recipient of a 1982 Ontario Special Achievement Award for "Major Contribution to Amateur Sport". As President of the International Curling Federation for three years, he was instrumental in increasing ladies’ involvement, and in changing fee structure for television rights and future hosts of upcoming events. He presented to the World’s Olympic Organization and the 1988 Olympic committee to admit curling as a demonstration sport in the Calgary Olympics.

Thompson moved to Stroud in 1979 and in 1980 along with Floyd Bean made a presentation to the Stroud Curling Club Board to request ice time for fourteen interested senior curlers. This number was not considered sufficient to warrant ice time but in April 1981, permission was given to create a league for senior curlers using the sheets of ice not needed by the Thursday Morning Ladies’ League. In 1986 there were enough curlers, fifty-five years and older to fill three sheets of ice. Ten years later the draws were full and the committee was forced to adopt a two-draw format. The league used and continues to use the jitney format for forming teams. The league’s philosophy encouraged the recreational value of the sport of curling, and the development of curling skills while helping one another enjoy the game itself. The mini-spiel format was introduced, allowing players from both draws to compete in two four end games.

Thompson promoted all aspect of curling; the skills, the rules, and the etiquette as well as the camaraderie. Thompson and his wife, Helen, operated a curling clinic to assist curlers of all levels become more confident in their abilities. Thompson was a club director for three years and acted as Honorary Chairman of the Masters and Colts Provincial Competition hosted by the Stroud Curling Club in 1995. In 1997 the Senior League at the Stroud Curling club officially became the ‘Clif Thompson Senior Curlers’ League. Thompson died in 2008; a permanent tribute to him is located on the Stroud Curling Club wall.
