= Stroud, Ontario =

Stroud
- Unincorporated community
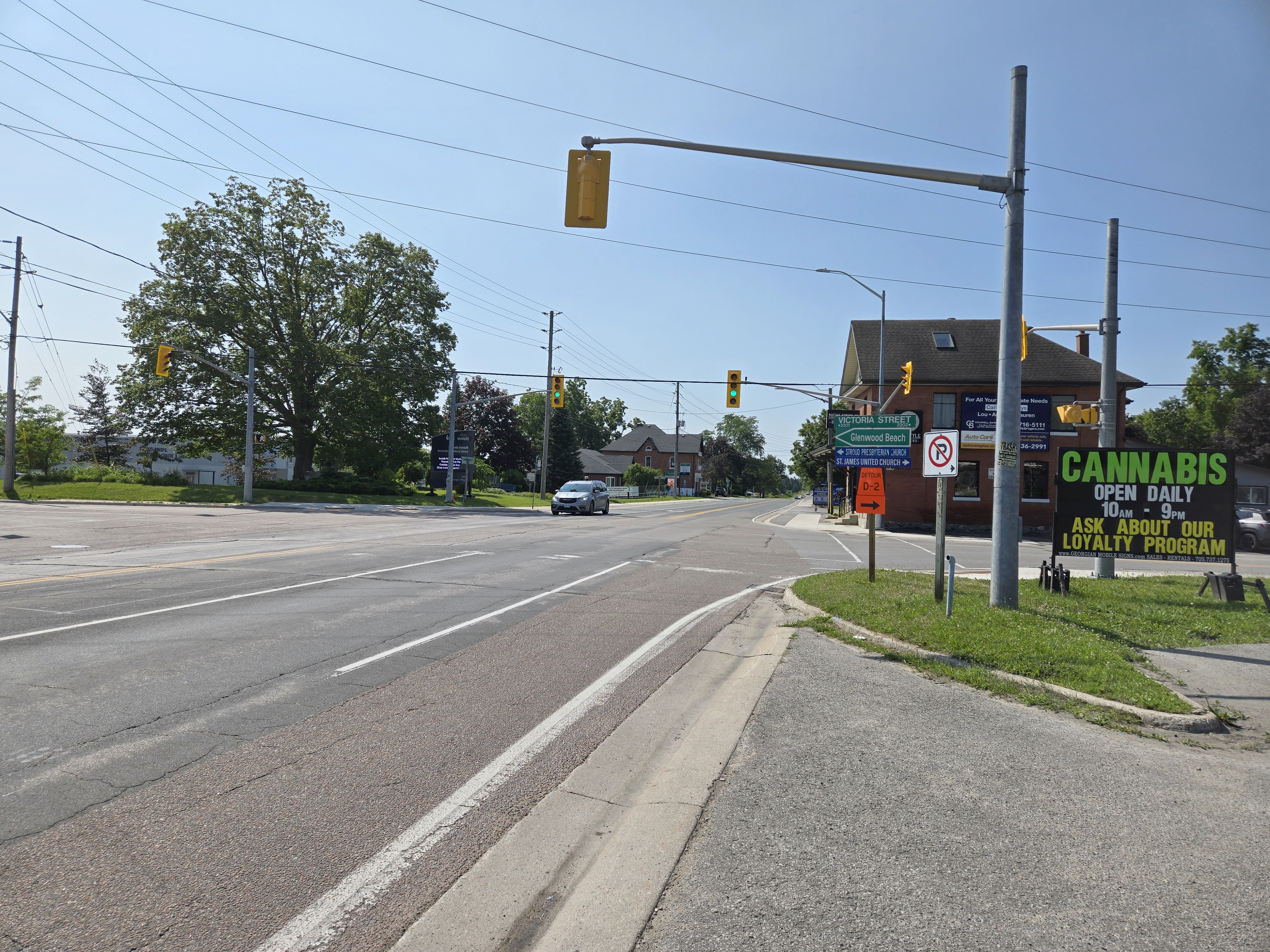
- Yonge Street in Stroud

- Location within Southern Ontario
- Coordinates: 44°19′35″N 79°37′09″W
- Country: Canada
- Province: Ontario
- County: Simcoe
- Township: Innisfil
- Time zone: UTC-5 (Eastern (EST))
  - Summer (DST): UTC-4 (EDT)
- GNBC Code: FCTGS

Stroud is an unincorporated community in Innisfil Township, Simcoe County, Ontario, Canada.

== History ==
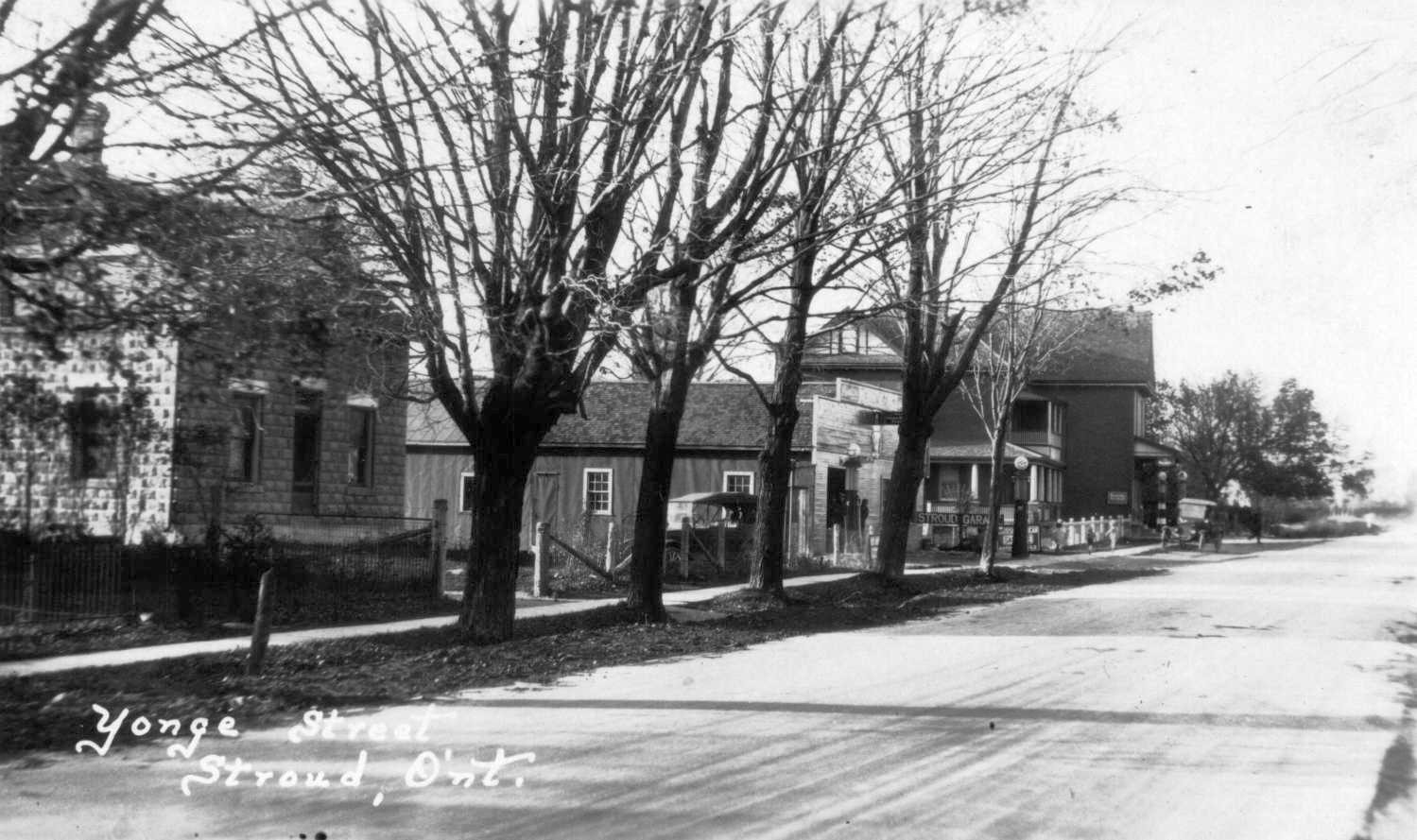
Yonge Street in Stroud, circa 1930

Settlers began building homes in the area in 1825. The settlement was first called "Meyer's Corners", and later changed to "Victoria" in honour of Queen Victoria. To avoid confusion with other postal locations named Victoria, the settlement was renamed "Stroud" in 1875, in honour of Stroud, England, hometown of W.C Little, Member of Parliament for South Simcoe.

The first church in Innisfil Township was St. James Church, a Methodist church established in Stroud in the 1830s. St. James Cemetery—first used by Methodists from northern Innisfil—contains graves dating back to 1842. The cemetery is still in use, and contains over 2,500 graves.

Stroud School—the first in the township—opened in a log building in 1838. It was replaced by a larger brick school in 1929.

The early settlement featured a gristmill, blacksmith, fabric shop, flower shop, and two hotels.

Minerva Lodge, a Masonic lodge, was established in 1873, and the first sidewalks were installed in 1907. The Stroud Telephone Company was established in 1911, and a library was started inside Chantler's Store in 1912.

Stroud entered a five-man brick throwing contest in 1961, competing against teams from Stroud, England, Stroud, Oklahoma, and Stroud, New South Wales.

In 1962, with a population of 700, Stroud had a post office, police station, fire hall, municipal office, several small businesses, three churches, and a motel with a restaurant.

== Sports ==
The Comco Cash Spiel is an annual curling bonspiel in Stroud.

== Notable people ==
- G. Clifton Thompson - curler
