= Aaron Squires =

Canadian curler

Aaron John Squires (born November 10, 1992, in Victoria, British Columbia) is a Canadian curler from St. Thomas, Ontario. He formerly played on the World Curling Tour.

As a junior curler, Squires and his St. Thomas Curling Club rink of Jason Camm, David Easter and Curtis Easter won the 2013 Pepsi Ontario Junior Curling Championships. The team then represented Ontario at the 2013 Canadian Junior Curling Championships, where they posted a 7–3 record before losing a tie-breaker match to Manitoba's Matt Dunstone rink. Later in the year, Squires was added to the Jake Higgs rink at the 2013 Canadian Olympic Curling Trials Qualifying Tournament as an alternate.

In university, Squires skipped the Wilfrid Laurier University rink at the 2014 CIS/CCA Curling Championships. His Laurier rink finished the event with a 6–1 round robin record (tied with Dunstone's University of Manitoba rink). Following the round robin, Laurier would lose to the University of Alberta (skipped by Brendan Bottcher). Squires was named as a CIS Men's Curling All-Canadian. Squires rebounded this year after being unable to play in the semi-finals and finals of OUA's last year due to an undisclosed illness by skipping his team to a gold medal performance at the 2015 OUA championships. His Laurier rink then competed at the 2015 CIS/CCA Curling Championships where they finished round robin with another 6–1 record. After defeating St.Marys quite handily in the semis, they fell short to the University of Alberta in the finals capturing the silver medal. Squires skipped the Laurier team again at the 2016 CIS/CCA Curling Championships, leading his team of Richard Krell, Spencer Nuttall, Fraser Reid, and Russell Cuddie to a 6–1 round robin record. In the playoffs, they won both their games, including defeating the University of Alberta (this time skipped by Thomas Scoffin) in the final. This qualified the team to represent Canada at the 2017 Winter Universiade. There, Squires led Canada to a 4–5 record, missing the playoffs.

Squires and his men's team of Matt Mapletoft, Spencer Nuttall and Fraser Reid qualified for the 2015 Ontario Tankard, his first provincial men's championship. To qualify, the team had to beat the former world champion Glenn Howard rink. At the 2015 Ontario Tankard, Squires led the team to a 3–7 record.

In 2015, Squires joined the Mark Bice team at third. They played in the 2016 Ontario Tankard, but finished with a poor 3–7 record. The next year, they played in the 2017 Canadian Olympic Pre-trials, but failed to make the playoffs, finishing with a 2–4 record. The team made it to the 2018 Ontario Tankard, but just missed out on qualifying for the playoffs. The next year they made it to the 2019 Ontario Tankard, where they finished with a 1–8 record, in last place.

Squires returned to the Tankard in 2023 as part of a new team with Travis Fanset, Craig Van Ymeren and Scott Brandon.

== Personal life ==
Squires works as a product specialist for STIHL Canada.
