= Ontario Curling Tour =

The Ontario Curling Tour is a group of curling bonspiels, which takes places in Ontario, Canada and surrounding jurisdictions.

The events for the Ontario Curling Tour begin at the end of August and typically run until December, with occasional events taking place in January. Several of the events on the Ontario Curling Tour were also included in the World Curling Tour. All events on the Ontario Curling Tour contain a prize purse for the winning teams, and award CTRS (Canadian Team Ranking System) points to the Canadian teams competing. CTRS points qualify teams for the Canadian Olympic Curling Trials. Many events earn points toward the World Curling Team ranking system as well.

== Men's events ==
Event	Location	Week	Purse
Stu Sells Oakville Tankard	Oakville, Ontario	4	CAD$28,000
Biosteel Oakville Fall Classic	Oakville, Ontario	5	CAD$15,000
AMJ Campbell Shorty Jenkins Classic	Cornwall, Ontario	6	CAD$60,200
Moosehead Fall Open	Ottawa, Ontario	7	CAD$6,000
KW Fall Classic	Waterloo, Ontario	7	CAD$9,900
Moosehead Classic	Ottawa, Ontario	9	CAD$10,000
StuSells Toronto Tankard	Toronto, Ontario	9	CAD$42,000
St. Paul Cashspiel	St. Paul, Minnesota	9	USD12,400
Stroud Sleeman Cash Spiel	Stroud, Ontario	10	CAD$12,380
Roy Inch & Sons Service Experts Classic	St. Thomas, Ontario	9	CAD$9,000
Challenge de Curling de Gatineau	Gatineau, Quebec	11	CAD$41,000
Huron ReproGraphics Oil Heritage Classic	Sarnia, Ontario	12	CAD$15,900
CookstownCash presented by Comco Canada Inc.	Cookstown, Ontario	13	CAD$11,200
Comco Cash Spiel	Stroud, Ontario	14	CAD$12,500
Port Elgin Superspiel	Port Elgin, Ontario	15	CAD$12,300
Coors Light Cash Spiel	Duluth, Minnesota	15	USD14,400
Brantford Nissan Classic	Brantford, Ontario	17	CAD$11,600
Curl Mesabi Cash Spiel	Eveleth, Minnesota	18	USD18,000
US Open of Curling	Blaine, Minnesota	21	USD19,000
The Dominion Tankard	Various	26	-

== Women's events ==
(As of the 2024–25 curling season)

Event	Location	Week	Purse
Stu Sells Oakville Tankard	Oakville, Ontario	6	CAD$15,000
AMJ Campbell Shorty Jenkins Classic	Cornwall, Ontario	7	CAD$45,000
KW Fall Classic	Waterloo, Ontario	8	CAD$8,500
Stu Sells Toronto Tankard	Toronto, Ontario	11	CAD$40,000
St. Paul Cashspiel	St. Paul, Minnesota	12	USD20,000
Stroud Sleeman Cash Spiel	Stroud, Ontario	12	CAD$12,800
Swiss Chalet Women's Curling Stadium Spiel	North Bay, Ontario	15	CAD$10,000
Stu Sells Living Waters Collingwood Classic	Collingwood, Ontario	17	CAD$25,000
Stu Sells Brantford Nissan Classic	Brantford, Ontario	19	CAD$15,000
Tillsonburg Women's Curling Classic	Tillsonburg, Ontario	33	CAD$10,200

== See also ==
- List of teams on the Ontario Curling Tour
