= 2012 Coors Light Cash Spiel =

World Curling Tour event

- Host city: Duluth, Minnesota
- Arena: Duluth Curling Club
- Dates: November 23–25
- Winner: (Ontario) Bryan Burgess
- Skip: Bryan Burgess
- Third: Mike Pozihun
- Second: Dale Weirsema
- Lead: Pat Berezoski
- Finalist: (Minnesota) John Shuster

The 2012 Coors Light Cash Spiel was held from November 23 to 25 at the Duluth Curling Club in Duluth, Minnesota as part of the 2012–13 World Curling Tour. It was held in conjunction with the 2012 Molson Cash Spiel. The event was held in a round robin format, and the purse for the event was USD14,400. In the final, Bryan Burgess of Ontario defeated John Shuster of Minnesota in an extra end with a score of 6–5.

== Teams ==
The teams are listed as follows:

Skip	Third	Second	Lead	Locale
Ryan Berg	Al Gulseth	Mark Gulseth	Jordan Brown	West Fargo, North Dakota
Joseph Bonfoey				Madison, Wisconsin
Trevor Bonot	Allen Macsemchuk	Chris Briand	Tim Jewett	Thunder Bay, Ontario
Craig Brown	Kroy Nernberger	Matt Hamilton	Derrick Casper	Madison, Wisconsin
Bryan Burgess	Mike Pozihun	Dale Weirsema	Pat Berezoski	Thunder Bay, Ontario
Derrick Casper	Marcus Fonger		Robert Splinter	Madison, Wisconsin
Jeff Currie	Mike McCarville	Colin Koivula	Jamie Childs	Thunder Bay, Ontario
Philip DeVore	Seppo Sormunen	Doug Cameron	Roger Hendrickson	Duluth, Minnesota
Chris Dolan	Cam McLelland	Tim Jeanetta	Brian Sparstad	St. Paul, Minnesota
Korey Dropkin	Mark Fenner	Connor Hoge	Alex Fenson	Wayland, Massachusetts
Mike Farbelow	Kevin Deeren	Kraig Deeren	Mark Lazar	St. Paul, Minnesota
Eric Fenson	Trevor Andrews	Blake Morton	Calvin Weber	Bemidji, Minnesota
Pete Fenson	Shawn Rojeski	Joe Polo	Ryan Brunt	Bemidji, Minnesota
Christopher Plys (fourth)	Tyler George (skip)	Rich Ruohonen	Colin Hufman	Duluth, Minnesota
Dale Gibbs	William Raymond	James Honsvall	Perry Tholl	St. Paul, Minnesota
Al Hackner	Kory Carr	Kristofer Leupen	Gary Champagne	Thunder Bay, Ontario
Dylan Johnston	Cody Johnston	Travis Showalter	Jay Turner	Thunder Bay, Ontario
Andy Jukich	Lyle Sige	Matt Zyblut	Duane Rutan	Duluth, Minnesota
Ethan Meyers	Kyle Kakela	Trevor Host	Cameron Ross	Duluth, Minnesota
Jeff Puleo	Derek Surka	Joel Cooper (Note: Cooper is now known as JayCee due to gender transition.)	Cooper Smith	Forest Lake, Minnesota
Tyler Runing	Dylan Deegan	Josh Moore	Eric Jaeger	Mankato, Minnesota
John Shuster	Jeff Isaacson	Jared Zezel	John Landsteiner	Duluth, Minnesota
Matt Stevens	Cody Stevens	Robert Liapis	Jeff Breyen	Bemidji, Minnesota
Brennan Wark	Jordan Potter	Kyle Toset	Joel Adams	Thunder Bay, Ontario
Tony Wright	Will Howieson	Jesse Jaeger	Wesley Leksell	Duluth, Minnesota

== Round-robin standings ==
Final round-robin standings

Key
Teams to Playoffs

Pool A	W	L
(Minnesota) Pete Fenson	4	0
(Massachusetts) Korey Dropkin	2	2
(Ontario) Trevor Bonot	1	2
(Minnesota) Philip DeVore	1	2
(North Dakota) Ryan Berg	1	3

Pool B	W	L
(Ontario) Bryan Burgess	3	0
(Minnesota) John Shuster	3	1
(Minnesota) Ethan Meyers	2	2
(Minnesota) Chris Dolan	1	3
(Minnesota) Jeff Puleo	0	3

Pool C	W	L
(Wisconsin) Craig Brown	4	0
(Minnesota) Eric Fenson	2	1
(Wisconsin) Joseph Bonfoey	2	2
(Minnesota) Tyler Runing	1	3
(Ontario) Dylan Johnston	0	3

Pool D	W	L
(Minnesota) Tyler George	4	0
(Ontario) Jeff Currie	3	1
(Wisconsin) Derrick Casper	2	2
(Minnesota) Matt Stevens	1	3
(Minnesota) Tony Wright	0	4

Pool E	W	L
(Minnesota) Mike Farbelow	3	1
(Ontario) Al Hackner	2	2
(Minnesota) Andy Jukich	2	2
(Ontario) Brennan Wark	2	2
(Minnesota) Dale Gibbs	1	3

== Playoffs ==
The playoffs draw is listed as follows:

Quarterfinals
(Minnesota) Tyler George	7
(Ontario) Jeff Currie	4
(Minnesota) Pete Fenson	3
(Minnesota) John Shuster	7
(Ontario) Bryan Burgess	6
(Minnesota) Mike Farbelow	3
(Wisconsin) Craig Brown	6
(Minnesota) Eric Fenson	7

Semifinals
(Minnesota) Tyler George	7
(Minnesota) John Shuster	8
(Ontario) Bryan Burgess	4
(Minnesota) Eric Fenson	3

Final
(Minnesota) John Shuster	5
(Ontario) Bryan Burgess	6
