= The Dominion 2012 Northern Ontario Men's Curling Championship =

Curling championship in Canada

- Host city: Sault Ste. Marie, Ontario
- Arena: Community First Curling Centre
- Dates: February 5–12
- Winner: Team Jacobs
- Curling club: Community First CC, Sault Ste. Marie
- Skip: Brad Jacobs
- Third: E. J. Harnden
- Second: Ryan Harnden
- Lead: Scott Seabrook
- Finalist: Mike Jakubo

The 2012 Dominion of Canada Northern Ontario Provincial Men's Curling Championship was held February 5–12 at the Soo Curlers Association in Sault Ste. Marie, Ontario. The winning team of Brad Jacobs represented Northern Ontario at the 2012 Tim Hortons Brier in Saskatoon, Saskatchewan.

== Teams ==
Skip	Third	Second	Lead	Club(s)
Mike Assad	Al Hackner	Justin Whitehurst	Jamie Childs	Fort William Curling Club, Thunder Bay
Trevor Bonot	Scott McCallum	Tim Jewett	Andrew McCormick	Stratton Curling Club, Stratton
Jordan Chandler	Kyle Chandler	Gavan Jamieson	Tom Cull	Sudbury Curling Club, Sudbury
Jeff Currie	Dylan Johnston	Cody Johnston	Mike Badiuk	Fort William Curling Club, Thunder Bay
Patrick Gelinas	Art Trudel	Luc Gelinas	Louis Gelinas	Voyageur Curling Club, Mattawa
Robbie Gordon	Ron Henderson	Dion Dumontelle	Doug Hong	Sudbury Curling Club, Greater Sudbury
Brad Jacobs	E. J. Harnden	Ryan Harnden	Scott Seabrook	Soo Curlers Association, Sault Ste. Marie
Mike Jakubo	Matt Seabrook	Sandy MacEwan	Lee Toner	Copper Cliff Curling Club, Copper Cliff, Ontario
Colin Koivula	Chris Briand	Justin Whitehurst	Jordan Potts	Fort William Curling Club, Thunder Bay
David MacInnes	Claude Lapointe	Roddy Lapointe	Ryan Dinesen	McIntyre Curling Club, Schumacher
Tim Phillips	Charlie Robert	Dan Lemieux	Rob Thomas	Soo Curlers Association, Sault Ste. Marie
Joe Scharf	Mike McCarville	Rob Champagne	Gary Champagne	Fort William Curling Club, Thunder Bay

== Standings ==
Skip (Club)	W	L	PF	PA	Ends Won	Ends Lost	Blank Ends	Stolen Ends
Mike Jakubo (Copper Cliff)	10	1	85	39	49	27	11	17
Brad Jacobs (Soo Curlers Association)	8	3	68	50	45	38	15	12
Tim Phillips (Soo Curlers Association)	7	4	68	53	42	41	12	14
Mike Assad (Fort William)	7	4	74	52	44	36	11	8
Joe Scharf (Fort William)	6	5	65	59	42	38	13	10
Colin Koivula (Fort William)	6	5	61	62	35	46	15	6
Trevor Bonot (Stratton)	6	5	63	57	41	43	12	11
Jeff Currie (Fort William)	4	7	61	68	46	41	11	11
Jordan Chandler (Sudbury)	4	7	57	76	39	44	12	10
Robbie Gordon (Sudbury)	3	8	64	87	41	50	16	5
David MacInnes (McIntyre)	3	8	59	73	37	38	11	5
Patrick Gelinas (Voyageur)	2	9	51	93	25	47	10	8

== Results ==
=== Draw 1 ===
February 5, 2:30 PM ET

Sheet A	1	2	3	4	5	6	7	8	9	10	Final
Jakubo 🔨	4	2	4	X	X	X	X	X	X	X	10
Chandler	0	0	0	X	X	X	X	X	X	X	0

Sheet B	1	2	3	4	5	6	7	8	9	10	Final
Currie 🔨	0	0	2	1	0	0	1	0	1	1	6
Bonot	0	1	0	0	2	0	0	1	0	0	4

Sheet C	1	2	3	4	5	6	7	8	9	10	Final
Gelinas	0	0	1	0	0	1	0	X	X	X	2
Assad 🔨	0	3	0	2	1	0	4	X	X	X	10

Sheet D	1	2	3	4	5	6	7	8	9	10	Final
Koivula 🔨	0	0	0	2	1	0	1	0	0	0	4
Phillips	0	0	2	0	0	1	0	1	1	1	6

Sheet E	1	2	3	4	5	6	7	8	9	10	11	Final
Gordon 🔨	1	0	0	0	3	0	0	1	0	1	0	6
Scharf	0	0	0	1	0	2	2	0	1	0	1	7

Sheet F	1	2	3	4	5	6	7	8	9	10	11	Final
Jacobs	0	2	1	0	1	1	0	0	1	0	1	7
MacInnes 🔨	1	0	0	2	0	0	0	1	0	2	0	6

=== Draw 2 ===
February 5, 7:30 PM ET

Sheet A	1	2	3	4	5	6	7	8	9	10	Final
Koivula 🔨	0	1	0	1	0	0	0	0	1	0	3
Jacobs	0	0	2	0	1	1	0	1	0	1	6

Sheet B	1	2	3	4	5	6	7	8	9	10	Final
Phillips	0	0	3	0	1	0	3	0	X	X	7
Gordon 🔨	0	0	0	0	0	1	0	1	X	X	2

Sheet C	1	2	3	4	5	6	7	8	9	10	Final
Scharf 🔨	0	1	0	0	0	0	X	X	X	X	1
Jakubo	0	0	2	0	3	3	X	X	X	X	8

Sheet D	1	2	3	4	5	6	7	8	9	10	Final
Assad 🔨	1	0	0	1	0	1	0	1	0	0	4
Bonot	0	2	0	0	1	0	1	0	1	2	7

Sheet E	1	2	3	4	5	6	7	8	9	10	Final
MacInnes 🔨	2	0	3	0	0	0	1	2	1	X	9
Gelinas	0	2	0	0	0	3	0	0	0	X	5

Sheet F	1	2	3	4	5	6	7	8	9	10	Final
Chandler	0	2	0	2	0	0	1	0	1	1	7
Currie 🔨	1	0	2	0	0	1	0	1	0	0	5

=== Draw 3 ===
February 6, 2:00 PM ET

Sheet A	1	2	3	4	5	6	7	8	9	10	Final
Currie	0	0	0	2	0	X	X	X	X	X	2
Scharf 🔨	3	3	0	0	2	X	X	X	X	X	8

Sheet B	1	2	3	4	5	6	7	8	9	10	Final
Chandler 🔨	0	1	0	1	0	1	0	X	X	X	3
Assad	2	0	3	0	2	0	2	X	X	X	9

Sheet C	1	2	3	4	5	6	7	8	9	10	Final
MacInnes	1	0	0	0	1	1	0	X	X	X	3
Phillips 🔨	0	2	3	1	0	0	3	X	X	X	9

Sheet D	1	2	3	4	5	6	7	8	9	10	Final
Jacobs	0	1	2	1	0	1	0	5	X	X	10
Gordon 🔨	1	0	0	0	0	0	2	0	X	X	3

Sheet E	1	2	3	4	5	6	7	8	9	10	Final
Bonot	0	0	0	0	1	0	X	X	X	X	1
Jakubo 🔨	0	3	1	1	0	2	X	X	X	X	7

Sheet F	1	2	3	4	5	6	7	8	9	10	Final
Gelinas	0	2	0	0	1	0	0	1	0	X	4
Koivula 🔨	2	0	1	2	0	0	0	0	2	X	7

=== Draw 4 ===
February 6, 7:30 PM ET

Sheet A	1	2	3	4	5	6	7	8	9	10	Final
Phillips	1	0	0	0	1	0	1	0	2	2	7
Assad 🔨	0	0	2	1	0	1	0	1	0	0	5

Sheet B	1	2	3	4	5	6	7	8	9	10	Final
Scharf	0	0	0	2	0	2	0	2	2	X	8
MacInnes 🔨	0	0	1	0	2	0	1	0	0	X	4

Sheet C	1	2	3	4	5	6	7	8	9	10	11	Final
Koivula	0	0	1	0	2	0	0	2	0	0	1	6
Chandler 🔨	0	1	0	1	0	1	0	0	0	2	0	5

Sheet D	1	2	3	4	5	6	7	8	9	10	Final
Jakubo	0	2	1	0	2	3	0	5	X	X	13
Gelinas 🔨	1	0	0	2	0	0	1	0	X	X	4

Sheet E	1	2	3	4	5	6	7	8	9	10	Final
Jacobs	0	1	0	0	0	1	0	1	0	X	3
Currie	1	0	1	1	0	0	1	0	5	X	9

Sheet F	1	2	3	4	5	6	7	8	9	10	Final
Gordon	0	0	2	0	1	1	0	0	0	X	4
Bonot 🔨	0	2	0	2	0	0	0	1	2	X	7

=== Draw 5 ===
February 7, 2:00 PM ET

Sheet A	1	2	3	4	5	6	7	8	9	10	Final
Gelinas 🔨	1	0	0	1	0	0	2	0	1	0	5
Gordon	0	0	1	0	1	1	0	1	0	2	6

Sheet B	1	2	3	4	5	6	7	8	9	10	Final
Jakubo	1	0	1	1	0	0	0	2	0	2	7
Jacobs 🔨	0	2	0	0	0	1	1	0	2	0	6

Sheet C	1	2	3	4	5	6	7	8	9	10	Final
Currie 🔨	1	0	0	2	0	1	0	1	1	X	6
Phillips	0	1	1	0	1	0	0	0	0	X	3

Sheet D	1	2	3	4	5	6	7	8	9	10	Final
MacInnes	0	3	0	1	0	3	0	3	X	X	10
Chandler 🔨	0	0	1	0	1	0	2	0	X	X	4

Sheet E	1	2	3	4	5	6	7	8	9	10	Final
Bonot 🔨	0	2	0	3	1	1	X	X	X	X	7
Koivula	0	0	1	0	0	0	X	X	X	X	1

Sheet F	1	2	3	4	5	6	7	8	9	10	Final
Assad 🔨	0	2	0	4	0	3	X	X	X	X	9
Scharf	0	0	1	0	1	0	X	X	X	X	2

=== Draw 6 ===
February 7, 7:30 PM ET

Sheet A	1	2	3	4	5	6	7	8	9	10	Final
Bonot	0	2	1	3	1	0	2	X	X	X	9
MacInnes 🔨	2	0	0	0	0	2	0	X	X	X	4

Sheet B	1	2	3	4	5	6	7	8	9	10	Final
Gelinas 🔨	0	2	0	1	0	0	0	3	2	0	8
Currie	1	0	2	0	0	2	1	0	0	0	6

Sheet C	1	2	3	4	5	6	7	8	9	10	Final
Chandler	1	0	0	0	1	0	1	1	1	0	6
Gordon 🔨	0	1	0	3	0	2	0	0	0	2	8

Sheet D	1	2	3	4	5	6	7	8	9	10	Final
Koivula	0	1	0	0	1	0	0	X	X	X	2
Scharf 🔨	2	0	1	2	0	3	1	X	X	X	9

Sheet E	1	2	3	4	5	6	7	8	9	10	Final
Assad 🔨	0	0	1	0	0	2	0	1	0	X	4
Jacobs	0	0	0	2	1	0	3	0	2	X	8

Sheet F	1	2	3	4	5	6	7	8	9	10	Final
Phillips 🔨	0	0	1	0	0	0	0	0	X	X	1
Jakubo	1	0	0	2	1	1	1	0	X	X	6

=== Draw 7 ===
February 8, 2:00 PM ET

Sheet A	1	2	3	4	5	6	7	8	9	10	Final
Jacobs 🔨	1	1	0	1	0	0	0	3	0	1	7
Phillips	0	0	1	0	0	0	2	0	1	0	4

Sheet B	1	2	3	4	5	6	7	8	9	10	Final
Koivula	0	0	1	0	3	0	0	3	1	X	8
Assad 🔨	1	0	0	1	0	1	0	0	0	X	3

Sheet C	1	2	3	4	5	6	7	8	9	10	Final
Scharf	0	2	0	1	1	0	1	0	1	X	6
Bonot 🔨	0	0	2	0	0	1	0	1	0	X	4

Sheet D	1	2	3	4	5	6	7	8	9	10	Final
Currie 🔨	0	0	0	1	1	1	0	1	0	X	4
Jakubo	0	2	1	0	0	0	1	0	2	X	6

Sheet E	1	2	3	4	5	6	7	8	9	10	Final
Gordon	0	0	2	0	0	1	0	2	0	X	5
MacInnes 🔨	0	2	0	3	0	0	1	0	2	X	8

Sheet F	1	2	3	4	5	6	7	8	9	10	Final
Chandler 🔨	0	0	0	0	2	2	0	0	3	0	7
Gelinas	1	1	1	1	0	0	0	1	0	3	8

=== Draw 8 ===
February 8, 7:30 PM ET

Sheet A	1	2	3	4	5	6	7	8	9	10	Final
Jakubo 🔨	0	3	0	2	0	1	2	1	X	X	9
Koivula	0	0	1	0	2	0	0	0	X	X	3

Sheet B	1	2	3	4	5	6	7	8	9	10	Final
Bonot 🔨	2	0	1	0	2	0	0	2	0	X	7
Phillips	0	1	0	2	0	1	1	0	0	X	5

Sheet C	1	2	3	4	5	6	7	8	9	10	Final
Gelinas	1	0	0	1	0	X	X	X	X	X	2
Jacobs 🔨	0	2	3	0	3	X	X	X	X	X	8

Sheet D	1	2	3	4	5	6	7	8	9	10	Final
MacInnes	0	1	0	0	2	0	X	X	X	X	3
Assad 🔨	2	0	3	1	0	2	X	X	X	X	8

Sheet E	1	2	3	4	5	6	7	8	9	10	11	Final
Scharf	0	0	2	1	0	2	0	0	0	1	0	6
Chandler 🔨	1	1	0	0	1	0	0	1	2	0	1	7

Sheet F	1	2	3	4	5	6	7	8	9	10	Final
Gordon 🔨	3	0	0	0	2	0	1	1	0	1	8
Currie	0	0	2	1	0	2	0	0	1	0	6

=== Draw 9 ===
February 9, 2:00 PM ET

Sheet A	1	2	3	4	5	6	7	8	9	10	Final
Currie 🔨	0	2	0	3	1	0	1	0	1	0	8
MacInnes	1	0	2	0	0	1	0	1	0	1	6

Sheet B	1	2	3	4	5	6	7	8	9	10	Final
Gelinas	1	0	3	0	0	1	0	0	1	X	6
Scharf	0	1	0	2	1	0	2	2	0	X	8

Sheet C	1	2	3	4	5	6	7	8	9	10	Final
Koivula 🔨	0	2	0	4	0	1	2	0	2	X	11
Gordon	2	0	1	0	2	0	0	2	0	X	7

Sheet D	1	2	3	4	5	6	7	8	9	10	Final
Phillips 🔨	0	0	3	0	1	0	2	1	0	1	8
Chandler	1	0	0	2	0	1	0	0	2	0	6

Sheet E	1	2	3	4	5	6	7	8	9	10	Final
Assad 🔨	1	0	0	0	1	0	0	3	1	X	6
Jakubo	0	0	1	1	0	1	0	0	0	X	3

Sheet F	1	2	3	4	5	6	7	8	9	10	Final
Jacobs 🔨	1	0	1	0	1	0	2	0	1	2	8
Bonot	0	1	0	1	0	1	0	1	0	0	4

=== Draw 10 ===
February 9, 7:30 PM ET

Sheet A	1	2	3	4	5	6	7	8	9	10	Final
Chandler 🔨	0	3	0	1	0	0	0	0	3	X	7
Bonot	0	0	0	0	1	1	1	1	0	X	4

Sheet B	1	2	3	4	5	6	7	8	9	10	11	Final
Gordon 🔨	2	0	2	1	0	3	0	2	0	1	0	11
Jakubo	0	4	0	0	2	0	3	0	2	0	1	12

Sheet C	1	2	3	4	5	6	7	8	9	10	Final
Assad 🔨	1	0	1	0	1	0	1	1	0	1	6
Currie	0	2	0	0	0	1	0	0	2	0	5

Sheet D	1	2	3	4	5	6	7	8	9	10	Final
Scharf 🔨	0	1	0	0	1	0	1	0	0	0	3
Jacobs	0	0	1	0	0	1	0	1	0	1	4

Sheet E	1	2	3	4	5	6	7	8	9	10	Final
Phillips 🔨	1	0	2	3	4	X	X	X	X	X	10
Gelinas	0	2	0	0	0	X	X	X	X	X	2

Sheet F	1	2	3	4	5	6	7	8	9	10	Final
MacInnes 🔨	0	1	0	0	2	0	0	1	0	X	4
Koivula	0	0	2	0	0	2	1	0	2	X	7

=== Draw 11 ===
February 10, 9:30 AM ET

Sheet A	1	2	3	4	5	6	7	8	9	10	Final
Gordon 🔨	0	1	0	2	0	1	0	0	X	X	4
Assad	1	0	2	0	2	0	1	3	X	X	9

Sheet B	1	2	3	4	5	6	7	8	9	10	Final
Jacobs 🔨	0	0	2	0	0	X	X	X	X	X	2
Chandler	0	1	0	4	1	X	X	X	X	X	6

Sheet C	1	2	3	4	5	6	7	8	9	10	Final
Jakubo 🔨	2	0	1	0	X	X	X	X	X	X	3
MacInnes	0	1	0	1	X	X	X	X	X	X	2

Sheet D	1	2	3	4	5	6	7	8	9	10	Final
Bonot	0	0	1	0	0	2	0	4	2	X	9
Gelinas	1	0	0	1	1	0	2	0	0	X	5

Sheet E	1	2	3	4	5	6	7	8	9	10	Final
Currie 🔨	0	0	1	1	0	X	X	X	X	X	2
Koivula	4	1	0	0	4	X	X	X	X	X	9

Sheet F	1	2	3	4	5	6	7	8	9	10	Final
Scharf	0	2	0	1	1	0	1	0	2	0	7
Phillips	1	0	3	0	0	2	0	1	0	1	8

== Playoffs ==
Page playoff system
1	Mike Jakubo	8
2	Brad Jacobs	6
3	Tim Phillips	10
4	Mike Assad	7

Semifinal
2	Brad Jacobs	14
3	Tim Phillips	3

Final
1	Mike Jakubo	2
2	Brad Jacobs	9

=== 3 vs. 4 ===
February 10, 2:00 PM ET

Sheet A	1	2	3	4	5	6	7	8	9	10	Final
Phillips 🔨	0	2	0	3	0	2	0	2	0	1	10
Assad	0	0	2	0	1	0	2	0	2	0	7

=== 1 vs. 2 ===
February 10, 7:30 PM ET

Sheet A	1	2	3	4	5	6	7	8	9	10	Final
Jakubo 🔨	0	2	1	0	1	0	2	0	2	X	8
Jacobs	0	0	0	2	0	3	0	1	0	X	6

=== Semifinal ===
February 11, 2:00 PM ET

Sheet A	1	2	3	4	5	6	7	8	9	10	Final
Phillips	0	0	1	0	2	0	X	X	X	X	3
Jacobs 🔨	2	1	0	3	0	8	X	X	X	X	14

=== Final ===
February 11, 7:30 PM ET

Sheet A	1	2	3	4	5	6	7	8	9	10	Final
Jakubo 🔨	0	1	0	0	0	1	0	0	X	X	2
Jacobs	0	0	2	2	0	0	2	3	X	X	9

The Dominion 2012 Northern Ontario Men's Curling Championship

Brad Jacobs
Northern Ontario Provincial Championship title
