= List of teams on the 2010–11 World Curling Tour =

Following is a list of teams on the 2010–11 World Curling Tour, which was part of the 2010-11 curling season. Only the skips of the teams are listed.

== Men ==
Skip	Locale
Jason Ackerman	Regina, Saskatchewan
Josh Adams	Ottawa, Ontario
Shawn Adams	Bridgewater, Nova Scotia
Steve Allen	Ottawa, Ontario
Chris Anderson	Rocky Mountain House, Alberta
Mike Anderson	Markham, Ontario
Trevor Anderson	Bemidji, Minnesota
Sam Antila	Thompson, Manitoba
Ted Appelman	Edmonton, Alberta
Rob Armitage	Red Deer, Alberta
Beno Arnold	Basel, Switzerland
Art Assman	Regina, Saskatchewan
Alexander Attinger	Dübendorf, Switzerland
Curtis Bale	Calgary, Alberta
Greg Balsdon	Toronto, Ontario
Christopher Bartsch	Füssen, Germany
Brent Bawel	Calgary, Alberta
John Benton	St. Paul, Minnesota
Ryan Berg	West Fargo, North Dakota
Jonathan Beuk	Kingston, Ontario
Mark Bice	Tara, Ontario
Andrew Bilesky	New Westminster, British Columbia
Todd Birr	Mankato, Minnesota
Scott Bitz	Regina, Saskatchewan
Derek Boe	Regina, Saskatchewan
David Bohn	Winnipeg, Manitoha
Joey Bonfoey	Green Bay, Wisconsin
Brendan Bottcher	Edmonton, Alberta
Tom Brewster	Aberdeen, Scotland
Craig Brown	Madison, Wisconsin
Randy Bryden	Regina, Saskatchewan
Tom Buchy	Marysville, British Columbia
Bryan Burgess	Thunder Bay, Ontario
Jim Bush	Calgary, Alberta
Mathew Camm	Ottawa, Ontario
Robert Campbell	Charlottetown, Prince Edward Island
Per Carlsén	Sundsvall, Sweden
Jordan Chandler	Sudbury, Ontario
Pierre Charette	Buckingham, Quebec
Jerry Chudley	Brookdale, Manitoba
Trevor Clifford	Thunder Bay, Ontario
Bryan Cochrane	Ottawa, Ontario
Dave Collyer	Belleville, Ontario
Nathan Connolly	Edmonton, Alberta
Denis Cordick	Georgetown, Ontario
Peter Corner	Brampton, Ontario
Wes Craig	Victoria, British Columbia
Warren Cross	Edmonton, Alberta
Scott Cruickshank	Medicine Hat, Alberta
Clint Cudmore	Sault Ste. Marie, Ontario
Randy Cumming	Mankato, Minnesota
Jeff Currie	Thunder Bay, Ontario
Giorgio da Rin	Cortina d'Ampezzo, Italy
Peter de Cruz	Geneva, Switzerland
Carl deConinck Smith	Rosetown, Saskatchewan
Robert Desjardins	Saguenay & Boucherville, Quebec
Stephen Dropkin	Boston, Massachusetts
Andrey Drozdov	Moscow, Russia
Thomas Due	Oslo, Norway
Thomas Dufour	Chamonix, France
Joe Dumontel	Brooks, Alberta
Simon Dupuis	Quebec City, Quebec
Randy Dutiaume	Winnipeg, Manitoba
Mike Eberle	Regina, Saskatchewan
Scott Edie	Potomac, Maryland
Niklas Edin	Karlstad, Sweden
Scott Egger	Brooks, Alberta
Pascal Eicher	Volketswil, Switzerland
Gregory Eigner	Fort Wayne, Indiana
Dave Elias	Winnipeg, Manitoba
Darren Engel	Regina, Saskatchewan
John Epping	Toronto, Ontario
Oskar Eriksson	Östersund, Sweden
Mike Farbelow	St. Paul, Minnesota
Pete Fenson	Bemidji, Minnesota
Martin Ferland	Trois-Rivières, Quebec
Duncan Fernie	Perth, Scotland
Ian Fitzner-Leblanc	Halifax, Nova Scotia
Rob Fleming	Morden, Manitoba
Rick Folk	Kamloops, British Columbia
Brian Forrest	Ottawa, Ontario
Michael Fournier	Montreal, Quebec
Rob Fowler	Brandon, Manitoba
Ally Fraser	Perth, Scotland
Mario Freiberger	Urdorf, Switzerland
Kevin Froidevaux	Lausanne, Switzerland
Brett Gallant	Charlottetown, Prince Edward Island
Keil Gallinger	Prescott, Ontario
Chris Gardner	Kitchener, Ontario
Jon Gardner	Vernon, British Columbia
Sean Geall	New Westminster, British Columbia
Brent Gedak	Estevan, Saskatchewan
Tyler George	Duluth, Minnesota
Pierre Gervais	Trois-Rivières, Quebec
Gerry Geurts	London, Ontario
George Godfrey	Madison, Wisconsin
Geoff Goodland	Eau Claire, Wisconsin
Travis Graham	Thompson, Manitoba
Sean Grassie	Winnipeg, Manitoba
James Grattan	Oromocto, New Brunswick
Tyrel Griffith	Vernon, British Columbia
Colin Griffiths	Grande Prairie, Alberta
Jason Gunnlaugson	Moscow, Russia
Brad Gushue	St. John's, Newfoundland and Labrador
David Haines	Regina, Saskatchewan
David Hamblin	Morris, Manitoba
Brad Hannah	Edmonton, Alberta
Wayne Harris	Comox Valley, British Columbia
Jeff Hartung	Langenburg, Saskatchewan
Warren Hassall	Lloydminster, Alberta
Marcus Hasselborg	Sundbyberg, Sweden
Cory Heggestad	Barrie, Ontario
Brad Hemeryck	Winnipeg, Manitoba
Guy Hemmings	Montreal, Quebec
Mark Herbert	Moose Jaw, Saskatchewan
Pascal Hess	Zug, Switxerland
Jake Higgs	Harriston, Ontario
Lloyd Hill	Calgary, Alberta
Colin Hodgson	Calgary, Alberta
Lee Hodgson	Lacombe, Alberta
Deane Horning	Castlegar, British Columbia
Glenn Howard	Coldwater, Ontario
Ryan Hyde	Portage la Prairie, Manitoba
Andrew Irving	Winnipeg, Manitoba
Brad Jacobs	Sault Ste. Marie, Ontario
Zach Jacobson	Langdon, North Dakota
Mike Jakubo	Sudbury, Ontario
Mark Johnson	Edmonton, Alberta
Scott Jones	Fredericton, New Brunswick
Jamey Jordison	Moose Jaw, Saskatchewan
Joel Jordison	Moose Jaw, Saskatchewan
Andy Kapp	Füssen, Germany
Mark Kean	Toronto, Ontario
Bryan Kedziora	New Westminster, British Columbia
Mark Kehoe	Windsor, Nova Scotia
Glen Kennedy	Edmonton, Alberta
Kalle Kiiskinen	Hyvinkää, Finland
Aleksandr Kirikov	Moscow, Russia
Adam Kitchens	Devils Lake, North Dakota
Kevin Knutson	Regina, Saskatchewan
Kevin Koe	Edmonton, Alberta
Stephen Kopf	New Westminster, British Columbia
David Kraichy	Winnipeg, Manitoba
Rob Krepps	Edmonton, Alberta
Clint Krismer	Regina, Saskatchewan
Roman Kutusov	Moscow, Russia
Jason Larway	Seattle, Washington
Shane Latimer	Ottawa, Ontario
Brad Law	Regina, Saskatchewan
Lee Dong-Keun	Gyeongbuk, Korea
Ron Leech	New Westminster, British Columbia
Alex Leichter	Wayland, Massachusetts
Simon Lejour	Lacolle, Quebec
Martin Lill	Tallinn?, Estonia
Duane Lindner	Toronto, Ontario
Thomas Lips	Baden, Switzerland
Rob Lobel	Whitby, Ontario
Jean-Nicolas Longchamp	Zürich, Switzerland
Trevor Loreth	Winnipeg, Manitoba
Thomas Løvold	Oslo, Norway
William Lyburn	Winnipeg, Manitoba
Steve Mackey	Calgary, Alberta
Glen MacLeod	Halifax, Nova Scotia
Allen Macsemchuk	Thunder Bay, Ontario
Scott Madams	Winnipeg, Manitoba
Dominik Märki	Bern, Switzerland
Kelly Marnoch	Carberry, Manitoba
Kevin Martin	Edmonton, Alberta
Dale Matchett	Bradford, Ontario
Ken McArdle	New Westminster, British Columbia
Greg McAulay	Richmond, British Columbia
Curtis McCannell	Pilot Mound, Manitoba
Heath McCormick	New York City, New York
Jeff McCrady	Ottawa, Ontario
Mike McEwen	Winnipeg, Manitoba
Rick McKague	Edmonton, Alberta
Darrell McKee	Saskatoon, Saskatchewan
Hammy McMillan	Stranraer, Scotland
Terry McNamee	Brandon, Manitoba
Terry Meek	Calgary, Alberta
Jean-Michel Ménard	Gatineau & Lévis, Quebec
Dave Merklinger	Vernon, British Columbia
Stu Merrifield	Victoria, British Columbia
Sven Michel	Adelboden, Switzerland
Wayne Middaugh	Toronto, Ontario
Bryan Miki	New Westminster, British Columbia
Garth Mitchell	Burlington, Ontario
Leon Moch	Medicine Hat, Alberta
Jason Montgomery	Duncan, British Columbia
Yusuke Morozumi	Karuizawa, Japan
Tim Morrison	Unionville, Ontario
Blake Morton	McFarland, Wisconsin
Braeden Moskowy	Regina, Saskatchewan
Darren Moulding	Lethbridge, Alberta
Richard Muntain	Lac du Bonnet, Manitoba
David Murdoch	Lockerbie, Scotland
Jamie Murphy	Halifax, Nova Scotia
György Nagy	Budapest, Hungary
Mark Neeleman	Zoetermeer, Netherlands
Kroy Nernberger	Madison, Wisconsin
Daniel Neuner	Garmisch-Partenkirchen, Germany
Peter Nicholls	Winnipeg, Manitoba
Frank O'Driscoll	Ottawa, Ontario
Kevin Park	Winnipeg, Manitoba
Matt Paul	Sault Ste. Marie, Ontario
Trevor Perepolkin	Vernon, British Columbia
Claudio Pescia	St. Gallen, Switzerland
Lowell Peterman	Red Deer, Alberta
Daley Peters	Winnipeg, Manitoba
Steve Petryk	Calgary, Alberta
Tim Phillips	Sudbury, Ontario
Brent Pierce	New Westminster, British Columbia
Chris Pleasants	Seattle, Washington
Mike Pozihun	Thunder Bay, Ontario
Andreas Prytz	Härnösand, Sweden
Paul Pustovar	Madison, Wisconsin
Howard Rajala	Ottawa, Ontario
Tomi Rantamäki	Kulosaari, Finland
Serge Reid	Saguenay, Quebec
Joel Retornaz	Cortina d'Ampezzo, Italy
Jeff Richard	Kelowna, British Columbia
Greg Richardson	Ottawa, Ontario
Gábor Riesz	Budapest, Hungary
Ian Robertson	Toronto, Ontario
Les Rogers	Edmonton, Alberta
Jerod Roland	Minot, North Dakota
Leon Romaniuk	Seattle, Washington
Dean Ross	Calgary, Alberta
Jean-Sebastian Roy	Quebec City, Quebec
Manuel Ruch	Uitikon, Switzerland
Brent Scales	Swan River, Manitoba
Robert Schlender	Edmonton, Alberta
Jamie Schneider	Kronau, Saskatchewan
Stephen Schneider	Richmond, British Columbia
Christof Schwaller	St. Moritz, Switzerland
Daniel Selke	Regina, Saskatchewan
Tobin Sennum	Vernon, British Columbia
Daryl Shane	Waterloo, Ontario
Lyle Sieg	San Francisco, California
David Sik	Prague, Czech Republic
Pat Simmons	Regina, Saskatchewan
David Sluchinsky	Airdrie, Alberta
Alex Smith	St. John's, Newfoundland and Labrador
Garth Smith	Winnipeg, Manitoba
Jiří Snítil	Prague, Czech Republic
Chad Stevens	Dartmouth/Chester, Nova Scotia
Andy Stewart	Stonewall, Manitoba
Jeff Stoughton	Winnipeg, Manitoba
Joacim Suhter	Oslo, Norway
Jeff Tait	Regina, Saskatchewan
Brendan Taylor	Brandon, Manitoba
Shawn Taylor	Brandon, Manitoba
Ken Thompson	Kingston, Ontario
Greg Todoruk	Dauphin, Manitoba
Pål Trulsen	Oslo, Norway
Alexey Tselousov	Moscow, Russia
Wayne Tuck, Jr.	Brantford, Ontario
Thomas Ulsrud	Oslo, Norway
Bob Ursel	Kelowna & Vernon, British Columbia
Markku Uusipaavalniemi	Helsinki, Finland
Jerry VanBrunt	Colorado Springs, Colorado
Jason Vaughan	Moncton, New Brunswick
Brock Virtue	Calgary, Alberta
Michal Vojtus	Savona, Czech Republic
Patrick Vuille	Glarus-Neuchâtel, Switzerland
Jake Vukich	Seattle, Washington
Don Walchuk	Edmonton, Alberta
Aaron Wald	Hibbing, Minnesota
Geoff Walker	Grande Prairie, Alberta
Bernhard Werthemann	Bern, Switzerland
Andrew Wickman	Winnipeg, Manitoba
Randy Woytowich	Regina, Saskatchewan
Tony Wright	Duluth, Minnesota
Xu Xiaoming	Harbin, China
Brent Yamada	Kamloops, British Columbia

== Women ==
Skip	Locale
Melissa Adams	Fredericton, New Brunswick
Giorgia Apollonio	Tofane & Cortina d'Ampezzo, Italy
Jerri Pat Armstrong-Smith	Cranbrook, British Columbia
Mary-Anne Arsenault	Halifax, Nova Scotia
Cathy Auld	Mississauga, Ontario
Nicole Backe	Victoria, British Columbia
Denna Bagshaw	Cannington, Ontario
Mitch Baker	Cornwall, Ontario
Marika Bakewell	Listowel, Ontario
Kirsty Balfour	Newcastle, England
Brett Barber	Saskatoon, Saskatchewan
Melanie Barbezat	Biel, Switzerland
Alicia Barker	Lloydminster, Alberta
Ève Bélisle	Montreal, Quebec
Cheryl Bernard	Calgary, Alberta
Suzanne Birt	Charlottetown, Prince Edward Island
Nicole Blenkin	Calgary, Alberta
Lisa Blixhavn	Winnipeg, Manitoba
Brandee Borne	Saskatoon, Saskatchewan
Erika Brown	Madison, Wisconsin
Joelle Brown	Winnipeg, Manitoba
Kathy Brown	Guelph, Ontario
Heather Burnett	Martensville, Saskatchewan
Christina Cadorin	Thornhill, Ontario
June Campbell	Calgary, Alberta
Chelsea Carey	Morden, Manitoba
Lenka Cernovska	Prague, Czech Republic
Marie Christianson	Halifax, Nova Scotia
Nadine Chyz	Calgary, Alberta
Michell Corbeil	Lloydminster, Alberta
Roselyn Craig	Duncan, British Columbia
Camille Crottaz	Geneva, Switzerland
Jennifer Crouse	Halifax, Nova Scotia
Delia DeJong	Edmonton, Alberta
Stacie Devereaux	St. John's, Newfoundland and Labrador
Tanilla Doyle	Calgary, Alberta
Ann Drummie	Potomac, Maryland
Nicole Dunki	Zürich, Switzerland
Madeleine Dupont	Tårnby, Denmark
Chantelle Eberle	Regina, Saskatchewan
Kerri Einarson	Winnipeg, Manitoba
Michelle Englot	Regina, Saskatchewan
Lisa Eyamie	Calgary, Alberta
Karen Fallis	Winnipeg, Manitoba
Lisa Farnell	Peterborough, Ontario
Binia Feltscher	Flims, Switzerland
Jen Fewster	Prince George, British Columbia
Diane Foster	Calgary, Alberta
Satsuki Fujisawa	Karuizawa, Japan
Fabienne Furbringer	Uitikon, Switzerland
Kerry Galusha	Yellowknife, Northwest Territories
Jaimee Gardner	Ottawa, Ontario
Jennifer Gerow	Vernon, British Columbia
Linn Githmark	Oslo, Norway
Alison Goring	Toronto, Ontario
Sofie Gustavsson	?, Sweden
Chrissy Haase	Wayland, Massachusetts
Jacqueline Harrison	Elmvale, Ontario
Nancy Harrison	Burlington, Ontario
Janet Harvey	Winnipeg, Manitoba
Anna Hasselborg	Gävle, Sweden
Julie Hastings	Toronto, Ontario
Patty Hersikorn	Saskatoon, Saskatchewan
Derna Hintz	Winnipeg, Manitoba
Amber Holland	Kronau, Saskatchewan
Rachel Homan	Ottawa, Ontario
Tracy Horgan	Sudbury, Ontario
Lauren Horton	Carp, Ontario
Ashley Howard	Moncton, New Brunswick
Juliane Jacoby	Oberstdorf, Germany
Michèle Jäggi	Bern, Switzerland
Daniela Jentsch	Füssen, Germany
Lisa Johnson	Edmonton, Alberta
Colleen Jones	Halifax, Nova Scotia
Jennifer Jones	Winnipeg, Manitoba
Tracey Jones	Prince George, British Columbia
Sherry Just	Winnipeg, Manitoba
Debra Karbashewski	Ottawa, Ontario
Ditte Karlsson	Östersund, Sweden
Jessie Kaufman	Edmonton, Alberta
Arlen Keck	Medicine Hat, Alberta
Andrea Kelly	Fredericton, New Brunswick
Barbara Kelly	Ottawa, Ontario
Kim Ji-Sun	Gyeonjgido, South Korea
Cathy King	Edmonton, Alberta
Shannon Kleibrink	Calgary, Alberta
Patti Knezevic	Prince George, British Columbia
Kerry Lackie	Waterloo, Ontario
Susan Lang	Regina, Saskatchewan
Patti Lank	Lewiston, New York
Marie-France Larouche	Lévis, Quebec
Kelley Law	New Westminster, British Columbia
Stefanie Lawton	Saskatoon, Saskatchewan
Nadine Lehmann	Bern, Switzerland
Shari Leibbrandt	Tilburg, Netherlands
Brooklyn Lemon	Regina, Saskatchewan
Kristy Lewis	Richmond, British Columbia
Crystal Lillico	Winchester, Ontario
Carrie Lindner	Sarnia, Ontario
Kim Link	East St. Paul, Manitoba
Allison MacInnes	New Westminster, British Columbia
Colleen Madonia	Thornhill, Ontario
Lindsay Makichuk	Red Deer, Alberta
Marla Mallett	Langley, British Columbia
Lauren Mann	Ottawa, Ontario
Kimberly Mastine	Montreal/Windsor, Quebec
Robyn Mattie	Ottawa, Ontario
Tina Mazerolle	Brantford, Ontario
Cheryl McBain	Ottawa, Ontario
Krista McCarville	Thunder Bay, Ontario
Christine McCrady	Ottawa, Ontario
Deb McCreanor	La Salle, Manitoba
Janet McGhee	Uxbridge, Ontario
Tiffany McKeeman	Edmonton, Alberta
Angie Melaney	Lakefield, Ontario
Sherry Middaugh	Coldwater, Ontario
Cindy Miller	St. John's, Newfoundland and Labrador
Katie Morrissey	Ottawa, Ontario
Eve Muirhead	Stirling, Scotland
Morgan Muise	Calgary, Alberta
Gail Munro	Stranraer, Scotland
Heather Nedohin	Edmonton, Alberta
Calleen Neufeld	Winnipeg, Manitoba
Sabrina Neufeld	Winkler, Manitoba
Shelley Nichols	St. John's, Newfoundland and Labrador
Anette Norberg	Harnosand, Sweden
Dordi Nordby	Oslo, Norway
Anna Ohmiya	Aomori, Japan
Brit O'Neill	Hamilton, Ontario
Kathy O'Rourke	Charlottetown, Prince Edward Island
Sherrilee Orsted	Estevan, Saskatchewan
Chantal Osborne	Thurso, Quebec
Mirjam Ott	Davos, Switzerland
Cathy Overton-Clapham	Winnipeg, Manitoba
Desiree Owen	Grande Prairie, Alberta
Trish Paulsen	Saskatoon, Saskatchewan
Laura Payne	Ottawa, Ontario
Colleen Pinkney	Truro, Nova Scotia
Allison Pottinger	Bemidji, Minnesota
Liudmilla Privivkova	Moscow, Russia
Tawni Proctor	Calgary, Alberta
Cassandra Ragenold	Ottawa, Ontario
Heather Rankin	Calgary, Alberta
Evita Regza	Riga, Latvia
Sarah Reid	Perth, Scotland
Sarah Rhyno	Halifax, Nova Scotia
Cindy Ricci	Estevan, Saskatchewan
Brette Richards	Winnipeg, Manitoba
Karen Rosser	Dugald, Manitoba
Tracy Samaan	Ottawa, Ontario
Bobbie Sauder	Edmonton, Alberta
Casey Scheidigger	Lethbridge, Alberta
Desiree Schmidt	Cranbrook, British Columbia
Andrea Schöpp	Garmisch-Partenkirchen, Germany
Holly Scott	Winnipeg, Manitoba
Kelly Scott	Kelowna, British Columbia
Mandy Selzer	Balgonie, Saskatchewan
Anna Sidorova	Moscow, Russia
Manuela Siegrist	Basel, Switzerland
Robyn Silvernagle	Meadow Lake, Saskatchewan
Dailene Sivertson	Victoria, British Columbia
Vicki Sjolie	Medicine Hat, ALberta
Kristin Skaslien	Oslo, Norway
Rhonda Skillen	Thunder Bay, Ontario
Shana Snell	Calgary, Alberta
Renée Sonnenberg	Grande Prairie, Alberta
Aileen Sormunen	St. Paul, Minnesota
Barb Spencer	Winnipeg, Manitoba
Jen Spencer	Guelph, Ontario
Shauna Streich	Winnipeg, Manitoba
Heather Strong	St. John's, Newfoundland and Labrador
Valerie Sweeting	Edmonton, Alberta
Hana Synáčková	Prague, Czech Republic
Ildiko Szekeres	Budapest, Hungary
Adina Tasaka	New Westminster, British Columbia
Karla Thompson	Kamloops, British Columbia
Jill Thurston	Winnipeg, Manitoba
Silvana Tirinzoni	Dübendorf, Switzerland
Karina Toth	Kitzbühel, Austria
Alyssa Vandepoele	Ste. Anne, Manitoba
Stina Viktorsson	Skellefteå, Sweden
Ellen Vogt	Liukumiinat, Finland
Kirsten Wall	Oakville, Ontario
Wang Bingyu	Harbin, China
Kimberly Wapola	St. Paul, Minnesota
Crystal Webster	Calgary, Alberta
Amanda White	Calgary, Alberta
Faye White	Edmonton, Alberta
Holly Whyte	Edmonton, Alberta
Melanie Wild	Dübendorf, Switzerland
Jill Winters	Trail, British Columbia
Samantha Yachiw	Regina, Saskatchewan
Nola Zingel	Lloydminster, Alberta
