= The Dominion 2009 Northern Ontario Men's Curling Championship =

- Host city: Fort Frances, Ontario
- Arena: Fort Frances Curling Club
- Dates: February 10–14
- Winner: Team Jakubo
- Curling club: Copper Cliff CC, Sudbury
- Skip: Mike Jakubo
- Third: Matt Seabrook
- Second: Luc Ouimet
- Lead: Lee Toner
- Finalist: Brad Jacobs

The Dominion 2009 Northern Ontario Provincial Men's Championship (Northern Ontario's men's provincial curling championship) was held February 10-14 at the Fort Frances Curling Club in Fort Frances. The winning team of Mike Jakubo represented Northern Ontario at the 2009 Tim Hortons Brier in Calgary.

== Teams ==
Skip	Vice	Second	Lead	Alternate	Club
Brian Adams Jr.	Ben Mikkelsen	Trevor Bonot	Taylor Kallos		Port Arthur Curling Club, Thunder Bay
Murray Affleck	Brent Taylor	Randy Baird	Dache Dimit		Keewatin Curling Club, Keewatin
Mike Assad	Eric Theriault	Justin Whitehurst	Jamie Childs		Fort William Curling Club, Thunder Bay
Al Belec	Rob Brewer	Scott Seabrook	Greg McLellan		Soo Curlers Curling Club, Sault Ste. Marie
Bryan Burgess	Jeff Currie	Gary Weiss	Pat Berezowski	Clayton Shaw	Port Arthur Curling Club, Thunder Bay
Matt Dumontelle	Brad Minogue	Dion Dumontelle	Ron Henderson		Sudbury Curling Club, Sudbury
Robbie Gordon	David MacInnes	Jerome Landry	Steve Burnett		Cobalt-Haileybury Curling Club, Haileybury
Brad Jacobs	E. J. Harnden	Ryan Harnden	Caleb Flaxey		Soo Curlers Curling Club, Sault Ste. Marie
Mike Jakubo	Matt Seabrook	Luc Ouimet	Lee Toner		Copper Cliff Curling Club, Copper Cliff
Chris Johnson	Dan Lemieux	Stephane Lemieux	Scott McDermott		Blind River Curling Club, Blind River
Claude Lapointe	Roddy Lapointe	Ryan Dinesen	Jerry Mikovitch		McIntyre Curling Club, Timmins
Art Lappalainen	Ron Rosengren	Rob Sinclair	Gary Maunula		Port Arthur Curling Club, Thunder Bay
Cory Nephin	Claude Beaulieu	Jamie Armstrong	Ken House		Geraldton Curling Club, Geraldton
Tim Phillips	Jamie Morphet	Sandy MacEwan	Tom Leonard	Ian Dickie	Sudbury Curling Club, Sudbury
Mike Pozihun	Deron Surkan	Andy Peloza	Aaron Rogalski		Port Arthur Curling Club, Thunder Bay
Robert Thomas	Charlie Robert	Clint Cudmore	Ken Graham		Soo Curlers Curling Club, Sault Ste. Marie

== Draw Brackets ==
=== A Event ===
Round of 16
Brad Jacobs	10
Cory Nephin	6
Brian Adams Jr	5
Mike Assad	6
Robbie Gordon	8
Chris Johnson	7
Mike Jakubo	6
Claude Lapointe	4
Al Belec	6
Robert Thomas	5
Art Lappalainen	5
Matt Dumontelle	7
Tim Phillips	8
Mike Pozihun	9
Bryan Burgess	9
Murray Affleck	4

Quarter-finals
Brad Jacobs	10
Mike Assad	3
Robbie Gordon	6
Mike Jakubo	8
Al Belec	6
Matt Dumontelle	4
Mike Pozihun	6
Bryan Burgess	3

Semi-finals
Brad Jacobs	7
Mike Jakubo	10
Al Belec	8
Mike Pozihun	7

A Qualifier Match
Mike Jakubo	7
Al Belec	6

=== B Event ===
Round of 16
Cory Nephin	3
Brian Adams Jr	7
Chris Johnson	6
Claude Lapointe	5

Quarterfinals
Brian Adams Jr	4
Matt Dumontelle	6
Chris Johnson	6
Bryan Burgess	7

Semifinals
Mike Pozihun	6
Matt Dumontelle	5
Bryan Burgess	7
Brad Jacobs	8

Finals
Mike Pozihun	6
Brad Jacobs	7
B Qualifier Match
Brad Jacobs	9
Art Lappalainen	4

Round of 16
Murray Affleck	1
Tim Phillips	8
Robert Thomas	2
Art Lappalainen	8

Quarterfinals
Tim Phillips	6
Robbie Gordon	11
Art Lappalainen	6
Mike Assad	5

Semifinals
Robbie Gordon	5
Art Lappalainen	6

Finals
Al Belec	6
Art Lappalainen	7

=== C Event ===
Round of 16		Quarterfinals		Semifinals		C Qualifier Match
				Bryan Burgess	3
Cory Nephin	4			Mike Assad	5
Claude Lapointe	10	Claude Lapointe	6
		Mike Assad	8
						Mike Assad	7
						Art Lappalainen	5

C Event play-in
1	Robert Thomas	7
2	Murray Affleck	4

Round of 16
Brian Adams Jr	6
Robert Thomas	7
Chris Johnson	3
Tim Phillips	8

Quarterfinals
Robert Thomas	10
Robbie Gordon	9
Tim Phillips	7
Matt Dumontelle	5

Semifinals
Mike Pozihun	7
Robert Thomas	2
Al Belec	9
Tim Phillips	3

C Qualifier Match
Mike Pozihun	8
Al Belec	4

== Results ==
=== Draw 1 ===
February 10, 0900

Sheet B	1	2	3	4	5	6	7	8	9	10	Final
Brad Jacobs	2	0	2	0	3	1	0	2	0	X	10
Cory Nephin	0	1	0	1	0	0	3	0	1	X	6

Sheet C	1	2	3	4	5	6	7	8	9	10	Final
Brian Adams Jr	0	1	0	1	0	0	0	2	1	0	5
Mike Assad	0	0	1	0	0	2	1	0	0	2	6

Sheet D	1	2	3	4	5	6	7	8	9	10	Final
Bryan Burgess	0	1	1	1	0	3	0	3	X	X	9
Murray Affleck	1	0	0	0	2	0	1	0	X	X	4

Sheet E	1	2	3	4	5	6	7	8	9	10	Final
Mike Jakubo	0	0	0	0	3	1	0	0	1	1	6
Claude Lapointe	0	1	1	1	0	0	1	0	0	0	4

=== Draw 2 ===
February 10, 1430

Sheet B	1	2	3	4	5	6	7	8	9	10	Final
Al Belec	2	0	0	0	2	0	0	0	1	1	6
Robert Thomas	0	1	0	1	0	1	1	1	0	0	5

Sheet C	1	2	3	4	5	6	7	8	9	10	Final
Art Lappalainen	1	1	0	0	0	1	0	1	1	0	5
Matt Dumontelle	0	0	0	3	1	0	2	0	0	1	7

Sheet D	1	2	3	4	5	6	7	8	9	10	11	Final
Tim Phillips	0	2	1	0	1	0	0	2	0	2	0	8
Mike Pozihun	0	0	0	1	0	3	2	0	2	0	1	9

Sheet E	1	2	3	4	5	6	7	8	9	10	11	Final
Robbie Gordon	0	1	0	1	0	3	0	2	0	0	1	8
Chris Johnson	1	0	2	0	1	0	1	0	0	2	0	7

=== Draw 3 ===
February 10, 1930

Sheet B	1	2	3	4	5	6	7	8	9	10	11	Final
Robbie Gordon	0	0	2	0	3	0	0	0	0	1	0	6
Mike Jakubo	0	1	0	1	0	2	1	1	0	0	2	8

Sheet C	1	2	3	4	5	6	7	8	9	10	Final
Mike Pozihun	0	0	2	0	0	0	2	0	2	X	6
Bryan Burgess	0	1	0	1	0	0	0	1	0	X	3

Sheet D	1	2	3	4	5	6	7	8	9	10	Final
Brad Jacobs	2	0	6	0	2	X	X	X	X	X	10
Mike Assad	0	1	0	2	0	X	X	X	X	X	3

Sheet E	1	2	3	4	5	6	7	8	9	10	Final
Al Belec	0	1	0	2	0	0	0	2	1	X	6
Matt Dumontelle	0	0	1	0	1	1	1	0	0	X	4

=== Draw 4 ===
February 11, 0900

Sheet B	1	2	3	4	5	6	7	8	9	10	Final
Murray Affleck	0	0	0	0	1	0	0	0	X	X	1
Tim Phillips	0	1	3	1	0	1	0	2	X	X	8

Sheet C	1	2	3	4	5	6	7	8	9	10	Final
Chris Johnson	1	0	0	1	0	1	2	0	0	1	6
Claude Lapointe	0	1	0	0	2	0	0	1	1	0	5

Sheet D	1	2	3	4	5	6	7	8	9	10	Final
Robert Thomas	0	0	0	1	0	1	X	X	X	X	2
Art Lappalainen	2	1	1	0	4	0	X	X	X	X	8

Sheet E	1	2	3	4	5	6	7	8	9	10	Final
Cory Nephin	1	0	0	1	0	0	0	1	X	X	3
Brian Adams Jr	0	1	2	0	1	0	3	0	X	X	7

=== Draw 5 ===
February 11, 1400

Sheet B	1	2	3	4	5	6	7	8	9	10	Final
Bryan Burgess	0	1	2	0	0	3	0	0	1	0	7
Chris Johnson	2	0	0	0	2	0	0	1	0	1	6

Sheet C	1	2	3	4	5	6	7	8	9	10	Final
Tim Phillips	1	0	2	1	0	0	0	2	0	X	6
Robbie Gordon	0	2	0	0	1	1	4	0	3	X	11

Sheet D	1	2	3	4	5	6	7	8	9	10	Final
Matt Dumontelle	0	1	0	2	0	2	1	0	X	X	6
Brian Adams Jr	0	0	2	0	1	0	0	1	X	X	4

Sheet E	1	2	3	4	5	6	7	8	9	10	Final
Mike Assad	0	0	0	1	0	2	0	0	2	0	5
Art Lappalainen	2	0	0	0	1	0	1	0	0	2	6

=== Draw 6 ===
February 11, 1900

Sheet B	1	2	3	4	5	6	7	8	9	10	Final
Al Belec	2	0	2	1	0	1	0	0	1	1	8
Mike Pozihun	0	2	0	0	3	0	1	1	0	0	7

Sheet C	1	2	3	4	5	6	7	8	9	10	Final
Robert Thomas	0	0	1	0	2	1	0	2	1	X	7
Murray Affleck	1	0	0	2	0	0	1	0	0	X	4

Sheet D	1	2	3	4	5	6	7	8	9	10	Final
Cory Nephin	2	1	0	0	1	0	0	X	X	X	4
Claude Lapointe	0	0	3	1	0	5	1	X	X	X	10

Sheet E	1	2	3	4	5	6	7	8	9	10	Final
Brad Jacobs	0	3	3	0	0	0	0	1	0	X	7
Mike Jakubo	1	0	0	1	2	2	1	0	3	X	10

=== Draw 7 ===
February 12, 0900

Sheet B	1	2	3	4	5	6	7	8	9	10	Final
Mike Assad	0	2	1	0	1	0	1	0	1	2	8
Claude Lapointe	1	0	0	1	0	1	0	3	0	0	6

Sheet D	1	2	3	4	5	6	7	8	9	10	Final
Chris Johnson	0	2	0	0	0	0	1	0	X	X	3
Tim Phillips	2	0	0	2	1	1	0	2	X	X	8

Sheet E	1	2	3	4	5	6	7	8	9	10	Final
Brian Adams Jr	0	0	0	2	0	0	1	0	3	0	6
Robert Thomas	0	1	1	0	2	1	0	1	0	1	7

=== Draw 8 ===
February 12, 1400

Sheet B	1	2	3	4	5	6	7	8	9	10	Final
Robbie Gordon	1	0	0	1	0	1	1	1	0	0	5
Art Lappalainen	0	1	0	0	3	0	0	0	1	1	6

Sheet C	1	2	3	4	5	6	7	8	9	10	11	Final
Bryan Burgess	0	1	2	0	2	0	0	1	0	1	0	7
Brad Jacobs	0	0	0	1	0	3	2	0	1	0	1	8

Sheet D	1	2	3	4	5	6	7	8	9	10	11	Final
Mike Jakubo	0	0	1	0	2	0	1	0	1	1	1	7
Al Belec	0	2	0	1	0	0	0	3	0	0	0	6

Sheet E	1	2	3	4	5	6	7	8	9	10	11	Final
Matt Dumontelle	0	0	0	2	0	0	0	1	1	1	0	5
Mike Pozihun	1	0	2	0	0	1	1	0	0	0	1	6

=== Draw 9 ===
February 12, 1900

Sheet B	1	2	3	4	5	6	7	8	9	10	11	Final
Brad Jacobs	0	0	2	1	0	1	0	0	2	0	1	7
Mike Pozihun	1	0	0	0	3	0	0	1	0	1	0	6

Sheet C	1	2	3	4	5	6	7	8	9	10	Final
Tim Phillips	0	1	0	1	0	3	0	0	2	X	7
Matt Dumontelle	0	0	1	0	1	0	2	1	0	X	5

Sheet D	1	2	3	4	5	6	7	8	9	10	11	Final
Robert Thomas	0	2	0	4	0	0	1	0	2	0	1	10
Robbie Gordon	1	0	2	0	0	2	0	2	0	2	0	9

Sheet E	1	2	3	4	5	6	7	8	9	10	Final
Art Lappalainen	1	0	0	3	1	0	2	0	0	0	7
Al Belec	0	0	1	0	0	2	0	0	2	1	6

=== Draw 10 ===
February 13, 0900

Sheet B	1	2	3	4	5	6	7	8	9	10	Final
Tim Phillips	0	0	1	0	0	1	1	0	X	X	3
Al Belec	2	1	0	0	3	0	0	3	X	X	9

Sheet C	1	2	3	4	5	6	7	8	9	10	Final
Art Lappalainen	0	1	0	0	1	0	2	0	X	X	4
Brad Jacobs	2	0	2	2	0	1	0	2	X	X	9

Sheet D	1	2	3	4	5	6	7	8	9	10	Final
Mike Assad	1	1	0	1	0	1	0	1	0	X	5
Bryan Burgess	0	0	0	0	2	0	1	0	0	X	3

Sheet E	1	2	3	4	5	6	7	8	9	10	Final
Mike Pozihun	1	0	3	1	2	0	X	X	X	X	7
Robert Thomas	0	1	0	0	0	1	X	X	X	X	2

=== Draw 11 ===
February 13, 1400

Sheet B	1	2	3	4	5	6	7	8	9	10	11	Final
Art Lappalainen	0	0	1	0	1	1	0	1	0	1	0	5
Mike Assad	1	0	0	1	0	0	1	0	2	0	2	7

Sheet C	1	2	3	4	5	6	7	8	9	10	Final
Mike Pozihun	2	3	0	1	0	2	0	0	0	X	8
Al Belec	0	0	1	0	2	0	0	0	1	X	4

== Playoffs ==
Page playoff system
A	Mike Jakubo	8
B	Brad Jacobs	5
C1	Mike Assad	7
C2	Mike Pozihun	5

Semifinal
B	Brad Jacobs	8
C1	Mike Assad	6

Final
A	Mike Jakubo	9
B	Brad Jacobs	4

=== A vs. B ===
February 13, 1900

Sheet C	1	2	3	4	5	6	7	8	9	10	Final
Mike Jakubo	0	0	2	1	0	2	2	0	1	X	8
Brad Jacobs	0	1	0	0	2	0	0	2	0	X	5

=== C1 vs. C2 ===
February 13, 1900

Sheet D	1	2	3	4	5	6	7	8	9	10	Final
Mike Pozihun	0	0	0	2	0	0	1	0	2	X	5
Mike Assad	1	1	1	0	1	1	0	2	0	X	7

=== Semifinal ===
February 14, 1300

Sheet C	1	2	3	4	5	6	7	8	9	10	11	Final
Brad Jacobs	1	0	0	2	0	0	2	0	1	0	2	8
Mike Assad	0	3	0	0	1	0	0	1	0	1	0	6

=== Final ===
February 14, 1900

Sheet C	1	2	3	4	5	6	7	8	9	10	Final
Mike Jakubo	0	2	0	1	2	0	2	0	2	X	9
Brad Jacobs	0	0	2	0	0	1	0	1	0	X	4
