= Duluth Cash Spiel =

Bonspiel tournament in Duluth, Minnesota, US

The Duluth Cash Spiel is an annual bonspiel, or curling tournament that is part of the Ontario Curling Tour. The men's event was held from at least 2001 to 2016 as part of the men's World Curling Tour and was known as the Coors Light Cash Spiel from 2010. The women's event was held from 2004 to 2016 and was known as the Molson Cash Spiel from 2010. Both events had been previously known as the Labatt Cash Spiel. The men's event was revived in January 2024 under the new name, Duluth Cash Spiel, while the women's event returned in December 2024.

The event takes place at the Duluth Curling Club in Duluth, Minnesota.

== Past champions ==
Only skip's name is displayed.

=== Men's ===
Year	Winning skip	Runner up skip	Purse (USD)
2001	(Ontario) Al Hackner	(Minnesota) Tim Wright	
2002	(Minnesota) Pete Fenson	(Ontario) Bryan Burgess	
2003	(Minnesota) Todd Birr	(Wisconsin) Craig Brown	$11,000
2004	(Ontario) Marshall Bagdon	(Manitoba) Bryan Burgess	
2005	(Minnesota) Paul Pustovar	(Wisconsin) Troy Schroeder	$14,800
2006	(Ontario) John Salo	(Minnesota) Pete Fenson	$12,400
2007	(Ontario) Jeff Currie	(Wisconsin) Craig Brown	
2008	(Wisconsin) Craig Brown	(Manitoba) Randy Neufeld	$13,500
2009	(Minnesota) Pete Fenson	(Wisconsin) Craig Brown	
2010	(Minnesota) Tyler George	(Minnesota) Pete Fenson	$12,000
2011	(Wisconsin) Craig Brown	(Ontario) Bryan Burgess	$13,500
2012	(Ontario) Bryan Burgess	(Minnesota) John Shuster	$14,400
2013	(Wisconsin) Craig Brown	(Ontario) Jeff Currie	$14,400
2014	(Minnesota) Heath McCormick	(Ontario) Al Hackner	$14,400
2015	(Minnesota) John Shuster	(Washington (state)) Brady Clark	$16,000
2016	(Minnesota) Heath McCormick	(Minnesota) John Shuster	$12,000
2024 (Jan.)	(Minnesota) Joe Polo	(Minnesota) Ethan Sampson	$12,000
2024 (Dec.)	(Ontario) John Epping	(Manitoba) Jordon McDonald	$22,000
2026	(Japan) Shinya Abe	(United States) Wesley Wendling	$15,000

=== Women's ===
Year	Winning skip	Runner up skip	Purse (USD)
2004	(New York (state)) Patti Lank		
2005	(Manitoba) Jennifer Jones	(Ontario) Jo-Ann Rizzo	$7,500
2006	(Minnesota) Aileen Sormunen	(Ontario) Michele Boland	$5,900
2007	(New York (state)) Patti Lank	(Manitoba) Patti Burtnyk	
2008	(Ontario) Krista McCarville	(Minnesota) Amy Wright	
2009	(Ontario) Shauna Kentonen	(Wisconsin) Erika Brown	
2010	(Ontario) Krista McCarville	(Minnesota) Aileen Sormunen	$6,000
2011	(Wisconsin) Becca Hamilton	(Ontario) Krista McCarville	$7,200
2012	(Ontario) Krista McCarville	(Wisconsin) Becca Hamilton	$7,200
2013	(Wisconsin) Jenna Haag	(Minnesota) Courtney George	$7,200
2014	(Minnesota) Cory Christensen	(Ontario) Kendra Lilly	$7,200
2015	(Ontario) Krista McCarville	(Minnesota) Nina Roth	$8,000
2016	(Minnesota) Nina Roth	(Minnesota) Jamie Sinclair	$9,000
2024	(Minnesota) Courtney Benson	(Ontario) Robyn Despins	$10,000
