= Lists of teams on the World Curling Tour =

The following articles contain list of teams on the World Curling Tour until 2021 when the tour became less prominent.

- List of teams on the 2010–11 World Curling Tour
- List of teams on the 2011–12 World Curling Tour
- List of teams on the 2012–13 World Curling Tour
- List of teams on the 2013–14 World Curling Tour
- List of teams on the 2014–15 World Curling Tour
- List of teams on the 2015–16 World Curling Tour
- List of teams on the 2016–17 World Curling Tour
- List of teams on the 2017–18 World Curling Tour
- List of teams on the 2018–19 World Curling Tour
- List of teams on the 2019–20 World Curling Tour
- List of teams on the 2020–21 World Curling Tour
