= 2012 Molson Cash Spiel =

World Curling Tour event

- Host city: Duluth, Minnesota
- Arena: Duluth Curling Club
- Dates: November 23–25
- Winner: (Ontario) Krista McCarville
- Skip: Krista McCarville
- Third: Ashley Miharija
- Second: Kari Lavoie
- Lead: Sarah Lang
- Finalist: (Wisconsin) Becca Hamilton

The 2012 Molson Cash Spiel was held from November 23 to 25 at the Duluth Curling Club in Duluth, Minnesota as part of the 2012–13 World Curling Tour. It was held in conjunction with the 2012 Coors Light Cash Spiel. The event was held in a round robin format, and the purse for the event was USD7,200. In the final, Krista McCarville of Ontario defeated Becca Hamilton of Wisconsin with a score of 8–4 for her third title.

== Teams ==
The teams are listed as follows:

Skip	Third	Second	Lead	Locale
Sarah Anderson	Kathleen Dubberstein	Taylor Anderson	Leilani Dubberstein	Philadelphia, Pennsylvania
Cory Christensen	Rebecca Funk	Anna Bauman	Sonja Bauman	Duluth, Minnesota
Marlo Dahl	Angela Lee-Wiwcharyk	Steph Davis	Kim Zsakai	Thunder Bay, Ontario
Brigid Ellig	Heather Van Sistine	Sara Shuster	Julia Boles	St. Paul, Minnesota
Liane Fossum	Shana Marchessault	Victoria Anderson	Lisa Auld	Thunder Bay, Ontario
Jenna Haag	Chloe Pahl	Grace Gabower	Erin Wallace	Janesville, Wisconsin
Becca Hamilton	Molly Bonner	Tara Peterson	Sophie Brorson	Madison, Wisconsin
Tirzah Keffer	Megan Westlund	Sheree Hinz	Rachel Camlin	Thunder Bay, Ontario
Charrissa Lin	Sherri Schummer	Emilia Juocys	Senja Lopac	New Haven, Connecticut
Krista McCarville	Ashley Miharija	Kari Lavoie	Sarah Lang	Thunder Bay, Ontario
Miranda Solem	Vicky Persenger	Karlie Koenig	Chelsea Solem	Cohasset, Minnesota
Amy Wright	Courtney George	Aileen Sormunen	Amanda McLean	Duluth, Minnesota

== Round-robin standings ==
Final round-robin standings

Key
Teams to Playoffs

Pool A	W	L
(Minnesota) Amy Wright	4	1
(Minnesota) Miranda Solem	3	2
(Ontario) Marlo Dahl	3	2
(Pennsylvania) Sarah Anderson	2	2
(Ontario) Laura Fossum	2	3
(Minnesota) Brigid Ellig	1	4

Pool B	W	L
(Wisconsin) Becca Hamilton	4	0
(Ontario) Krista McCarville	4	1
(Ontario) Tirzah Keffer	2	2
(Wisconsin) Jenna Haag	2	3
(Minnesota) Cory Christensen	1	3
(Connecticut) Charrissa Lin	0	4

== Playoffs ==
The playoffs draw is listed as follows:

Semifinals
1	(Minnesota) Amy Wright	4
4	(Ontario) Krista McCarville	6
3	(Wisconsin) Becca Hamilton	6
2	(Minnesota) Miranda Solem	5

Final
(Ontario) Krista McCarville	8
(Wisconsin) Becca Hamilton	4
