= 2014 Travelers Men's NOCA Provincials =

- Host city: Schumacher, Ontario
- Arena: McIntyre Curling Club
- Dates: February 5–10
- Winner: Jeff Currie
- Curling club: Fort William CC, Thunder Bay
- Skip: Jeff Currie
- Third: Mike McCarville
- Second: Colin Koivula
- Lead: Jamie Childs
- Finalist: Brian Adams, Jr.

The 2014 Travelers Men's NOCA Provincials, the provincial men's curling championship for Northern Ontario, were held from February 5 to 10 at the McIntyre Curling Club in Schumacher, Ontario. The winning Jeff Currie rink represented Northern Ontario at the 2014 Tim Hortons Brier in Kamloops.

== Teams ==
The defending champion Brad Jacobs rink did not participate in the event, as they represented Canada at the 2014 Winter Olympics.

Skip	Third	Second	Lead	Alternate	Locale(s)
Brian Adams, Jr.	Brennan Wark	Jordan Potts	Joel Adams		Port Arthur Curling Club, Thunder Bay
Trevor Bonot	Al Macsemchuk	Chris Briand	Tim Jewett	Jordan Potter	Port Arthur Curling Club, Thunder Bay
Bryan Burgess	Mike Pozihun	Deron Surkan	Pat Berezowski	Rob Champagne	Port Arthur Curling Club, Thunder Bay
Jeff Currie	Mike McCarville	Colin Koivula	Jamie Childs		Fort William Curling Club, Thunder Bay
Robbie Gordon	Ron Henderson	Dion Dumontelle	Doug Hong	Keith Furevick	Sudbury Curling Club, Sudbury
Mike Jakubo	Jordan Chandler	Sandy MacEwan	Lee Toner		Sudbury Curling Club, Sudbury
Dylan Johnston	Mike Badiuk	Kyle Toset	Travis Showalter		Fort William Curling Club, Thunder Bay
Dan Lemieux	Clint Cudmore	Stephane Lemieux	Marc Barrette	Mike Assad	Soo Curlers Association, Sault Ste. Marie

== Round-robin standings ==
Final round-robin standings

Key
Teams to Playoffs
Teams to Tiebreakers

Skip (Club)	W	L	PF	PA
Brian Adams, Jr. (Port Arthur)	6	1	48	38
Jeff Currie (Fort William)	5	2	48	37
Robbie Gordon (Sudbury)	4	3	46	37
Mike Jakubo (Sudbury)	4	3	49	45
Dylan Johnston (Fort William)	4	3	40	43
Bryan Burgess (Port Arthur)	3	4	45	46
Trevor Bonot (Port Arthur)	1	6	29	48
Dan Lemieux (Soo)	1	6	29	42

== Round-robin results ==
=== Draw 1 ===
Wednesday, February 5, 2:30 pm

Sheet A	1	2	3	4	5	6	7	8	9	10	Final
Mike Jakubo	0	2	0	1	0	1	0	1	0	X	5
Brian Adams, Jr.	0	0	1	0	3	0	2	0	2	X	8

Sheet B	1	2	3	4	5	6	7	8	9	10	Final
Trevor Bonot	1	0	0	1	0	1	0	X	X	X	3
Jeff Currie	0	2	2	0	3	0	2	X	X	X	9

Sheet C	1	2	3	4	5	6	7	8	9	10	11	Final
Robbie Gordon	0	2	0	3	0	0	1	0	0	1	0	7
Bryan Burgess	2	0	1	0	1	2	0	0	1	0	1	8

Sheet D	1	2	3	4	5	6	7	8	9	10	Final
Dan Lemieux	0	0	1	0	1	0	0	0	1	0	3
Dylan Johnston	0	0	0	2	0	1	0	0	0	1	4

=== Draw 2 ===
Wednesday, February 5, 7:30 pm

Sheet A	1	2	3	4	5	6	7	8	9	10	Final
Bryan Burgess	3	0	0	1	0	0	3	0	2	X	9
Dylan Johnston	0	0	2	0	2	1	0	1	0	X	6

Sheet B	1	2	3	4	5	6	7	8	9	10	Final
Robbie Gordon	0	1	1	0	1	4	1	X	X	X	8
Dan Lemieux	1	0	0	2	0	0	0	X	X	X	3

Sheet C	1	2	3	4	5	6	7	8	9	10	Final
Brian Adams, Jr.	2	0	2	0	0	3	0	0	1	X	8
Jeff Currie	0	0	0	2	0	0	2	1	0	X	5

Sheet D	1	2	3	4	5	6	7	8	9	10	Final
Mike Jakubo	1	0	2	0	4	0	0	2	X	X	9
Trevor Bonot	0	1	0	1	0	0	2	0	X	X	4

=== Draw 3 ===
Thursday, February 6, 1:00 pm

Sheet A	1	2	3	4	5	6	7	8	9	10	Final
Robbie Gordon	1	0	0	0	2	1	0	1	0	X	5
Jeff Currie	0	2	2	0	0	0	3	0	1	X	8

Sheet B	1	2	3	4	5	6	7	8	9	10	Final
Mike Jakubo	1	3	0	0	1	0	2	0	1	X	8
Dylan Johnston	0	0	2	0	0	2	0	1	0	X	5

Sheet C	1	2	3	4	5	6	7	8	9	10	Final
Dan Lemieux	0	0	1	0	1	1	0	0	1	X	4
Trevor Bonot	1	3	0	1	0	0	1	1	0	X	7

Sheet D	1	2	3	4	5	6	7	8	9	10	Final
Brian Adams, Jr.	2	0	1	0	0	4	1	0	0	0	8
Bryan Burgess	0	2	0	1	1	0	0	2	0	1	7

=== Draw 4 ===
Thursday, February 6, 7:30 pm

Sheet A	1	2	3	4	5	6	7	8	9	10	11	Final
Trevor Bonot	0	0	0	0	2	1	0	0	2	1	0	6
Bryan Burgess	3	1	1	0	0	0	1	0	0	0	1	7

Sheet B	1	2	3	4	5	6	7	8	9	10	Final
Dan Lemieux	0	0	1	0	0	2	0	1	0	X	4
Brian Adams Jr.	0	2	0	1	0	0	2	0	1	X	6

Sheet C	1	2	3	4	5	6	7	8	9	10	Final
Mike Jakubo	0	2	0	0	2	0	0	0	2	0	6
Robbie Gordon	0	0	0	3	0	1	0	2	0	2	8

Sheet D	1	2	3	4	5	6	7	8	9	10	Final
Dylan Johnston	0	0	2	0	1	1	2	0	2	0	8
Jeff Currie	1	1	0	2	0	0	0	2	0	1	7

=== Draw 5 ===
Friday, February 7, 12:00 pm

Sheet A	1	2	3	4	5	6	7	8	9	10	Final
Dan Lemieux	0	1	0	0	0	2	0	2	1	0	6
Mike Jakubo	1	0	1	2	0	0	3	0	0	1	8

Sheet B	1	2	3	4	5	6	7	8	9	10	Final
Jeff Currie	0	0	1	0	0	0	2	1	0	2	6
Bryan Burgess	0	0	0	1	1	0	0	0	2	0	4

Sheet C	1	2	3	4	5	6	7	8	9	10	Final
Trevor Bonot	0	2	0	1	0	0	0	0	1	0	4
Dylan Johnston	1	0	1	0	2	0	0	1	0	1	6

Sheet D	1	2	3	4	5	6	7	8	9	10	Final
Robbie Gordon	0	1	0	0	0	1	0	2	0	0	4
Brian Adams Jr.	0	0	2	1	0	0	1	0	0	2	6

=== Draw 6 ===
Friday, February 7, 7:30 pm

Sheet A	1	2	3	4	5	6	7	8	9	10	Final
Brian Adams, Jr.	0	0	1	0	0	1	1	0	1	1	5
Trevor Bonot	1	1	0	0	0	0	0	1	0	0	3

Sheet B	1	2	3	4	5	6	7	8	9	10	Final
Dylan Johnston	0	0	0	1	0	1	1	0	1	X	4
Robbie Gordon	2	1	0	0	2	0	0	1	0	X	6

Sheet C	1	2	3	4	5	6	7	8	9	10	11	Final
Jeff Currie	0	0	0	0	2	0	0	2	1	0	2	7
Mike Jakubo	0	2	0	0	0	2	0	0	0	1	0	5

Sheet D	1	2	3	4	5	6	7	8	9	10	Final
Bryan Burgess	1	0	0	0	0	1	0	1	0	X	3
Dan Lemieux	0	1	0	1	1	0	1	0	1	X	5

=== Draw 7 ===
Saturday, February 8, 9:30 am

Sheet A	1	2	3	4	5	6	7	8	9	10	Final
Jeff Currie	1	0	0	3	0	1	0	0	0	1	6
Dan Lemieux	0	0	1	0	1	0	0	0	2	0	4

Sheet B	1	2	3	4	5	6	7	8	9	10	11	Final
Bryan Burgess	1	1	0	2	0	2	0	0	0	1	0	7
Mike Jakubo	0	0	3	0	2	0	0	1	1	0	1	8

Sheet C	1	2	3	4	5	6	7	8	9	10	11	Final
Dylan Johnston	0	1	0	0	1	0	2	0	2	0	1	7
Brian Adams, Jr.	0	0	1	1	0	2	0	1	0	1	0	6

Sheet D	1	2	3	4	5	6	7	8	9	10	Final
Trevor Bonot	0	0	1	0	0	1	0	X	X	X	2
Robbie Gordon	0	1	0	3	1	0	3	X	X	X	8

== Tiebreakers ==
Saturday, February 8, 2:30 pm

Sheet C	1	2	3	4	5	6	7	8	9	10	11	Final
Dylan Johnston	0	0	2	0	2	0	1	0	0	1	0	6
Mike Jakubo	0	1	0	1	0	1	0	2	1	0	1	7

Saturday, February 8, 7:30 pm

Sheet B	1	2	3	4	5	6	7	8	9	10	Final
Robbie Gordon	0	0	1	0	1	0	1	1	1	0	5
Mike Jakubo	0	1	0	2	0	3	0	0	0	1	7

== Playoffs ==
Semifinal			Final
			1	Brian Adams, Jr.	4
2	Jeff Currie	5	2	Jeff Currie	9
3	Mike Jakubo	4

=== Semifinal ===
Sunday, February 9, 9:00 am

Sheet B	1	2	3	4	5	6	7	8	9	10	Final
Jeff Currie	0	1	0	0	1	0	1	1	0	1	5
Mike Jakubo	0	0	2	2	0	0	0	0	0	0	4

=== Final ===
Sunday, February 9, 2:00 pm

Sheet B	1	2	3	4	5	6	7	8	9	10	Final
Brian Adams, Jr.	0	0	3	0	0	0	0	1	0	X	4
Jeff Currie	0	0	0	2	1	1	3	0	2	X	9

2014 Travelers Men's NOCA Provincials

Jeff Currie
1st Northern Ontario Championship title
