= 1996 Canadian Junior Curling Championships =

1996 Maple Leaf Canadian Junior Curling Championships Presented by Husky
- Host city: Edmonton, Alberta
- Arena: Shamrock Curling Club; Granite Curling Club
- Dates: February 3–11
- Men's winner: Northern Ontario
- Curling club: Port Arthur Curling Club, Thunder Bay
- Skip: Jeff Currie
- Third: Greg Given
- Second: Andrew Mikkelsen
- Lead: Tyler Oinonen
- Coach: Don Main
- Finalist: Manitoba (Ryan Fry)
- Women's winner: Alberta
- Curling club: Grande Prairie Curling Club, Grande Prairie
- Skip: Heather Godberson
- Third: Carmen Whyte
- Second: Kristie Moore
- Lead: Terelyn Bloor
- Coach: Brian Moore
- Finalist: Saskatchewan (Cindy Street)

The 1996 Maple Leaf Canadian Junior Curling Championships, the men's and women's national junior curling championships of Canada, were held February 3 to 11 at the Shamrock and Granite Curling Clubs in Edmonton, Alberta. The 1996 event was the first to be sponsored by Maple Leaf Foods.

In their first season together, the Jeff Currie rink, representing Northern Ontario won the men's event, defeating future Olympic champion Ryan Fry and his team from Manitoba in the final. The team went on to represent Canada at the 1996 World Junior Curling Championships in Red Deer, where they finished fourth. It was Northern Ontario's fourth junior men's title.

The women's side was won by the Heather Godberson (now Nedohin) rink from Alberta. Team Alberta would defeat Saskatchewan, skipped by Cindy Street in the final. At the 1996 Worlds, Godberson led team Canada to a gold medal performance. Alberta's win was the fifth women's junior championship for that province.

== Men's ==
The men's field included future Olympic champions Ryan Fry (Manitoba) and Brad Gushue (Newfoundland) as well as future Brier champion Jean-Michel Ménard (Quebec).

=== Teams ===
Province / Territory	Skip	Third	Second	Lead
Alberta	Sheldon Schafer	Ryland Brusky	Rennie Cannings	Roderick Brusky
British Columbia	TJ Perepolkin	Rick Sawatsky	Nathan Munk	David Orme
Manitoba	Ryan Fry	Jimmi Bush	Jason Smith	Gilles Pelletier
New Brunswick	Peter Case	Mark Dobson	Paul Dobson	Geoff Porter
Newfoundland	Brad Gushue	Randy Turpin	Brett Reynolds	Colin Josephson
Northern Ontario	Jeff Currie	Greg Given	Andrew Mikkelsen	Tyler Oinonen
Northwest Territories	Jamie Koe	Kevin Whitehead	Blair Hamer	Kevin Cymbalisty
Nova Scotia	Rob Sifton	Graham Eisenhauer	Georg Ernst	Kris MacLeod
Ontario	Patrick Ferris	Heath McCormick	Shaun Harris	Bryan Johnson
Prince Edward Island	Jamie Newson	Jeff Smith	Dan Gallant	Kyle MacDonald
Quebec	Jean-Michel Menard	Nicolas Menard	Ian Belleau	Simon Collin
Saskatchewan	Joel Jordison	Jason Ackerman	Derek Owens	Brock Montgomery
Yukon	Wyatt Redlin	Jason Abel	Jessi Birnie	Joshua Clark

=== Standings ===
Locale	Skip	W	L
Manitoba	Ryan Fry	9	3
Northern Ontario	Jeff Currie	8	4
Ontario	Patrick Ferris	7	5
British Columbia	TJ Perepolkin	7	5
Northwest Territories	Jamie Koe	7	5
Nova Scotia	Rob Sifton	7	5
Alberta	Sheldon Schafer	6	6
New Brunswick	Peter Case	5	7
Newfoundland	Brad Gushue	5	7
Saskatchewan	Joel Jordison	5	7
Quebec	Jean-Michel Menard	5	7
Yukon	Wyatt Redlin	4	8
Prince Edward Island	Jamie Newson	3	9

=== Results ===
==== Draw 1 ====
Sheet A	1	2	3	4	5	6	7	8	9	10	Final
Northern Ontario (Currie) 🔨	1	0	2	0	1	1	0	1	0	1	7
Newfoundland (Gushue)	0	2	0	2	0	0	1	0	1	0	6

Sheet B	1	2	3	4	5	6	7	8	9	10	Final
Yukon (Redlin) 🔨	0	1	0	1	2	0	0	0	1	0	5
British Columbia (Perepolkin)	1	0	2	0	0	0	1	1	0	1	6

Sheet C	1	2	3	4	5	6	7	8	9	10	Final
Nova Scotia (Sifton) 🔨	0	1	0	2	2	1	0	1	0	X	7
Prince Edward Island (Newson)	0	0	1	0	0	0	1	0	2	X	4

Sheet D	1	2	3	4	5	6	7	8	9	10	Final
Alberta (Schafer) 🔨	1	1	0	0	1	2	0	1	4	X	10
Manitoba (Fry)	0	0	2	1	0	0	1	0	0	X	4

Sheet E	1	2	3	4	5	6	7	8	9	10	Final
Saskatchewan (Jordison) 🔨	1	0	2	0	1	0	0	0	1	2	7
Northwest Territories (Koe)	0	2	0	1	0	2	0	1	0	0	6

Sheet F	1	2	3	4	5	6	7	8	9	10	Final
New Brunswick (Case) 🔨	1	0	0	0	1	0	2	1	0	X	5
Quebec (Menard)	0	0	0	0	0	1	0	0	1	X	2

==== Draw 2 ====
Sheet A	1	2	3	4	5	6	7	8	9	10	Final
Manitoba (Fry) 🔨	0	0	0	0	0	2	0	1	0	1	4
New Brunswick (Case)	0	1	0	0	0	0	0	0	1	0	2

Sheet B	1	2	3	4	5	6	7	8	9	10	Final
Ontario (Ferris) 🔨	1	0	0	1	0	2	0	4	0	1	9
Quebec (Menard)	0	0	2	0	1	0	1	0	2	0	6

Sheet C	1	2	3	4	5	6	7	8	9	10	Final
Newfoundland (Gushue) 🔨	0	0	0	0	0	2	0	1	0	1	4
Yukon (Redlin)	1	0	0	0	0	0	1	0	1	0	3

Sheet D	1	2	3	4	5	6	7	8	9	10	Final
Northern Ontario (Currie) 🔨	1	0	1	0	3	0	2	0	2	X	9
Nova Scotia (Sifton)	0	1	0	1	0	1	0	1	0	X	4

Sheet E	1	2	3	4	5	6	7	8	9	10	Final
British Columbia (Perepolkin) 🔨	0	1	0	0	4	1	0	2	X	X	8
Alberta (Schafer)	0	0	1	0	0	0	2	0	X	X	3

Sheet F	1	2	3	4	5	6	7	8	9	10	11	Final
Prince Edward Island (Newson) 🔨	1	0	0	1	0	0	2	0	0	2	0	6
Northwest Territories (Koe)	0	1	2	0	1	0	0	0	2	0	1	7

==== Draw 3 ====
Sheet A	1	2	3	4	5	6	7	8	9	10	Final
Quebec (Menard) 🔨	2	1	0	0	3	0	3	0	X	X	9
Saskatchewan (Jordison)	0	0	2	0	0	1	0	1	X	X	4

Sheet B	1	2	3	4	5	6	7	8	9	10	11	Final
Ontario (Ferris) 🔨	1	0	0	2	0	0	1	0	1	1	0	6
Manitoba (Fry)	0	0	2	0	0	2	0	2	0	0	1	7

Sheet C	1	2	3	4	5	6	7	8	9	10	Final
Northwest Territories (Koe) 🔨	2	0	2	0	1	3	0	2	X	X	10
Northern Ontario (Currie)	0	2	0	1	0	0	1	0	X	X	4

Sheet D	1	2	3	4	5	6	7	8	9	10	Final
New Brunswick (Case) 🔨	0	2	1	0	0	0	1	0	1	X	5
British Columbia (Perepolkin)	1	0	0	2	0	1	0	3	0	X	7

Sheet E	1	2	3	4	5	6	7	8	9	10	Final
Nova Scotia (Sifton) 🔨	1	0	0	0	1	0	0	2	0	X	4
Newfoundland (Gushue)	0	2	1	0	0	3	3	0	1	X	10

Sheet F	1	2	3	4	5	6	7	8	9	10	Final
Alberta (Schafer) 🔨	0	1	2	1	0	0	1	0	0	X	5
Yukon (Redlin)	1	0	0	0	0	2	0	1	0	X	4

==== Draw 4 ====
Sheet A	1	2	3	4	5	6	7	8	9	10	Final
Nova Scotia (Sifton) 🔨	0	1	0	1	0	2	0	0	1	0	5
Northwest Territories (Koe)	0	0	1	0	2	0	2	1	0	1	7

Sheet B	1	2	3	4	5	6	7	8	9	10	Final
Newfoundland (Gushue) 🔨	0	0	0	1	0	0	0	0	1	0	2
Alberta (Schafer)	0	1	1	0	1	0	0	0	0	1	4

Sheet C	1	2	3	4	5	6	7	8	9	10	Final
Manitoba (Fry) 🔨	0	0	1	0	3	0	4	0	3	X	11
Saskatchewan (Jordison)	0	0	0	1	0	1	0	2	0	X	4

Sheet D	1	2	3	4	5	6	7	8	9	10	Final
Prince Edward Island (Newson) 🔨	1	0	2	0	1	0	1	0	2	0	7
Quebec (Menard)	0	1	0	1	0	3	0	2	0	3	10

Sheet E	1	2	3	4	5	6	7	8	9	10	11	Final
Yukon (Redlin) 🔨	0	0	0	0	1	0	2	0	1	0	1	5
New Brunswick (Case)	0	0	0	0	0	1	0	2	0	1	0	4

Sheet F	1	2	3	4	5	6	7	8	9	10	Final
British Columbia (Perepolkin) 🔨	1	0	0	1	0	2	0	0	X	X	4
Ontario (Ferris)	0	2	0	0	1	0	3	4	X	X	10

==== Draw 5 ====
Sheet A	1	2	3	4	5	6	7	8	9	10	Final
Ontario (Ferris) 🔨	1	1	4	0	0	3	X	X	X	X	9
Yukon (Redlin)	0	0	0	1	0	0	X	X	X	X	1

Sheet B	1	2	3	4	5	6	7	8	9	10	Final
Saskatchewan (Jordison) 🔨	0	1	0	0	0	2	0	0	3	X	6
British Columbia (Perepolkin)	0	0	1	0	0	0	0	1	0	X	2

Sheet C	1	2	3	4	5	6	7	8	9	10	Final
New Brunswick (Case) 🔨	1	0	0	2	0	0	2	0	0	1	6
Alberta (Schafer)	0	1	0	0	1	0	0	2	1	0	5

Sheet D	1	2	3	4	5	6	7	8	9	10	11	Final
Northwest Territories (Koe) 🔨	2	0	0	0	0	2	0	0	0	2	2	8
Newfoundland (Gushue)	0	2	0	0	0	0	0	4	0	0	0	6

Sheet E	1	2	3	4	5	6	7	8	9	10	Final
Quebec (Menard) 🔨	0	0	1	0	0	2	0	0	3	X	6
Northern Ontario (Currie)	0	0	0	0	1	0	2	0	0	X	3

Sheet F	1	2	3	4	5	6	7	8	9	10	Final
Manitoba (Fry) 🔨	3	2	1	0	3	0	X	X	X	X	9
Prince Edward Island (Newson)	0	0	0	2	0	1	X	X	X	X	3

==== Draw 6 ====
Sheet A	1	2	3	4	5	6	7	8	9	10	Final
Northern Ontario (Currie) 🔨	2	0	0	0	1	0	2	0	1	1	7
Manitoba (Fry)	0	2	1	0	0	1	0	2	0	0	6

Sheet B	1	2	3	4	5	6	7	8	9	10	11	Final
Yukon (Redlin) 🔨	0	0	0	0	3	0	0	1	1	0	4	9
Saskatchewan (Jordison)	0	0	1	2	0	1	0	0	0	1	0	5

Sheet C	1	2	3	4	5	6	7	8	9	10	Final
Nova Scotia (Sifton) 🔨	1	0	2	0	0	1	1	0	2	2	9
Quebec (Menard)	0	1	0	1	3	0	0	1	0	0	6

Sheet D	1	2	3	4	5	6	7	8	9	10	Final
Alberta (Schafer) 🔨	1	0	0	1	0	0	1	0	X	X	3
Ontario (Ferris)	0	0	0	0	2	3	0	3	X	X	8

Sheet E	1	2	3	4	5	6	7	8	9	10	Final
Prince Edward Island (Newson) 🔨	0	1	0	2	0	3	0	0	1	0	7
British Columbia (Perepolkin)	3	0	1	0	2	0	1	1	0	1	9

Sheet F	1	2	3	4	5	6	7	8	9	10	Final
Newfoundland (Gushue) 🔨	2	0	0	0	0	1	0	0	0	0	3
New Brunswick (Case)	0	2	0	0	0	0	1	0	0	1	4

==== Draw 7 ====
Sheet A	1	2	3	4	5	6	7	8	9	10	Final
Saskatchewan (Jordison) 🔨	1	0	0	1	0	2	0	X	X	X	4
Alberta (Schafer)	0	0	3	0	5	0	4	X	X	X	12

Sheet B	1	2	3	4	5	6	7	8	9	10	Final
Quebec (Menard) 🔨	1	0	0	0	0	2	1	0	0	X	4
Northwest Territories (Koe)	0	0	1	0	0	0	0	1	0	X	2

Sheet C	1	2	3	4	5	6	7	8	9	10	Final
Prince Edward Island (Newson) 🔨	2	1	2	0	1	0	2	0	X	X	8
Yukon (Redlin)	0	0	0	1	0	2	0	1	X	X	4

Sheet D	1	2	3	4	5	6	7	8	9	10	Final
Manitoba (Fry) 🔨	0	2	0	2	0	2	3	1	X	X	10
Nova Scotia (Sifton)	1	0	1	0	1	0	0	0	X	X	3

Sheet E	1	2	3	4	5	6	7	8	9	10	Final
Ontario (Ferris) 🔨	1	0	0	2	0	0	0	0	0	1	4
New Brunswick (Case)	0	0	1	0	0	2	0	0	0	0	3

Sheet F	1	2	3	4	5	6	7	8	9	10	Final
British Columbia (Perepolkin) 🔨	1	0	0	0	1	0	2	0	3	0	7
Northern Ontario (Currie)	0	0	0	2	0	1	0	3	0	2	8

==== Draw 8 ====
Sheet A	1	2	3	4	5	6	7	8	9	10	Final
Newfoundland (Gushue) 🔨	3	0	0	1	0	0	3	0	2	X	9
Ontario (Ferris)	0	0	2	0	1	0	0	1	0	X	4

Sheet B	1	2	3	4	5	6	7	8	9	10	Final
Nova Scotia (Sifton) 🔨	2	1	0	0	2	0	1	0	0	1	7
British Columbia (Perepolkin)	0	0	1	2	0	1	0	2	0	0	6

Sheet C	1	2	3	4	5	6	7	8	9	10	Final
Yukon (Redlin) 🔨	0	0	0	2	0	0	0	1	0	X	3
Northern Ontario (Currie)	0	0	1	0	0	0	0	0	0	X	1

Sheet D	1	2	3	4	5	6	7	8	9	10	Final
New Brunswick (Case) 🔨	0	2	4	0	1	2	X	X	X	X	9
Saskatchewan (Jordison)	0	0	0	0	0	0	X	X	X	X	0

Sheet E	1	2	3	4	5	6	7	8	9	10	Final
Northwest Territories (Koe) 🔨	2	0	1	1	0	1	0	1	0	X	6
Manitoba (Fry)	0	2	0	0	0	0	1	0	0	X	3

Sheet F	1	2	3	4	5	6	7	8	9	10	Final
Alberta (Schafer) 🔨	0	1	0	4	1	0	0	3	X	X	9
Prince Edward Island (Newson)	0	0	1	0	0	1	1	0	X	X	3

==== Draw 9 ====
Sheet A	1	2	3	4	5	6	7	8	9	10	Final
British Columbia (Perepolkin) 🔨	0	1	0	2	1	0	1	0	0	2	7
Northwest Territories (Koe)	2	0	2	0	0	0	0	1	0	0	5

Sheet B	1	2	3	4	5	6	7	8	9	10	Final
Prince Edward Island (Newson) 🔨	0	0	1	0	0	3	0	0	0	1	5
New Brunswick (Case)	2	0	0	1	0	0	1	0	0	0	4

Sheet C	1	2	3	4	5	6	7	8	9	10	Final
Quebec (Menard) 🔨	1	0	0	0	1	0	0	2	0	0	4
Newfoundland (Gushue)	0	0	0	2	0	2	1	0	0	0	5

Sheet D	1	2	3	4	5	6	7	8	9	10	Final
Northern Ontario (Currie) 🔨	2	1	0	1	0	1	0	3	X	X	8
Alberta (Schafer)	0	0	1	0	1	0	1	0	X	X	3

Sheet E	1	2	3	4	5	6	7	8	9	10	Final
Yukon (Redlin) 🔨	2	0	0	0	1	0	1	0	0	X	4
Nova Scotia (Sifton)	0	0	2	0	0	1	0	3	1	X	7

Sheet F	1	2	3	4	5	6	7	8	9	10	Final
Saskatchewan (Jordison) 🔨	1	0	0	2	0	0	0	2	1	2	8
Ontario (Ferris)	0	1	0	0	1	1	0	0	0	0	3

==== Draw 10 ====
Sheet A	1	2	3	4	5	6	7	8	9	10	Final
Alberta (Schafer) 🔨	1	0	0	2	0	2	0	1	0	0	6
Nova Scotia (Sifton)	0	1	0	0	2	0	2	0	0	2	7

Sheet B	1	2	3	4	5	6	7	8	9	10	Final
New Brunswick (Case) 🔨	0	1	0	0	0	0	1	1	0	3	6
Northern Ontario (Currie)	1	0	0	0	0	1	0	0	2	0	4

Sheet C	1	2	3	4	5	6	7	8	9	10	Final
Ontario (Ferris) 🔨	0	2	0	1	0	0	0	2	0	X	5
Prince Edward Island (Newson)	0	0	3	0	2	2	0	0	1	X	8

Sheet D	1	2	3	4	5	6	7	8	9	10	Final
Northwest Territories (Koe) 🔨	0	0	0	1	0	1	0	0	1	0	3
Yukon (Redlin)	0	0	0	0	1	0	3	0	0	1	5

Sheet E	1	2	3	4	5	6	7	8	9	10	Final
Newfoundland (Gushue) 🔨	1	0	0	0	0	0	2	0	0	0	3
Saskatchewan (Jordison)	0	0	0	1	0	0	0	2	1	1	5

Sheet F	1	2	3	4	5	6	7	8	9	10	11	Final
Quebec (Menard) 🔨	0	2	0	0	0	0	0	0	0	1	0	3
Manitoba (Fry)	0	0	2	0	0	0	0	1	0	0	2	5

==== Draw 11 ====
Sheet A	1	2	3	4	5	6	7	8	9	10	Final
Nova Scotia (Sifton) 🔨	1	0	2	0	2	0	2	1	0	X	8
New Brunswick (Case)	0	3	0	1	0	2	0	0	1	X	7

Sheet B	1	2	3	4	5	6	7	8	9	10	Final
Northwest Territories (Koe) 🔨	1	0	0	0	1	0	0	0	0	1	3
Alberta (Schafer)	0	1	0	0	0	0	1	0	0	0	2

Sheet C	1	2	3	4	5	6	7	8	9	10	Final
Northern Ontario (Currie) 🔨	0	0	0	3	2	0	0	0	0	1	6
Ontario (Ferris)	0	0	0	0	0	1	0	3	1	0	5

Sheet D	1	2	3	4	5	6	7	8	9	10	Final
Prince Edward Island (Newson) 🔨	0	0	0	0	0	0	0	2	0	X	2
Saskatchewan (Jordison)	0	0	0	0	0	0	3	0	1	X	4

Sheet E	1	2	3	4	5	6	7	8	9	10	Final
Manitoba (Fry) 🔨	0	3	0	2	0	0	0	3	0	X	8
Newfoundland (Gushue)	0	0	2	0	1	0	1	0	1	X	5

Sheet F	1	2	3	4	5	6	7	8	9	10	Final
British Columbia (Perepolkin) 🔨	0	1	0	1	0	1	0	1	0	X	4
Quebec (Menard)	0	0	0	0	0	0	1	0	1	X	2

==== Draw 12 ====
Sheet A	1	2	3	4	5	6	7	8	9	10	11	Final
Saskatchewan (Jordison) 🔨	0	0	1	0	0	0	2	0	0	2	0	5
Northern Ontario (Currie)	0	2	0	0	0	1	0	2	0	0	1	6

Sheet B	1	2	3	4	5	6	7	8	9	10	Final
Quebec (Menard) 🔨	1	0	2	0	0	2	0	2	0	X	7
Yukon (Redlin)	0	1	0	1	0	0	2	0	1	X	5

Sheet C	1	2	3	4	5	6	7	8	9	10	Final
Manitoba (Fry) 🔨	0	1	0	1	0	0	1	1	0	1	5
British Columbia (Perepolkin)	0	0	1	0	2	0	0	0	1	0	4

Sheet D	1	2	3	4	5	6	7	8	9	10	Final
Newfoundland (Gushue) 🔨	3	3	1	0	0	3	X	X	X	X	10
Prince Edward Island (Newson)	0	0	0	2	0	0	X	X	X	X	2

Sheet E	1	2	3	4	5	6	7	8	9	10	Final
New Brunswick (Case) 🔨	2	0	0	0	0	0	0	0	1	0	3
Northwest Territories (Koe)	0	2	0	0	0	1	0	0	0	2	5

Sheet F	1	2	3	4	5	6	7	8	9	10	Final
Ontario (Ferris) 🔨	1	1	1	0	0	3	0	1	0	X	7
Nova Scotia (Sifton)	0	0	0	0	1	0	1	0	0	X	2

==== Draw 13 ====
Sheet A	1	2	3	4	5	6	7	8	9	10	11	Final
Northwest Territories (Koe) 🔨	1	0	1	0	0	0	0	0	0	0	0	2
Ontario (Ferris)	0	0	0	0	1	0	0	1	0	0	2	4

Sheet B	1	2	3	4	5	6	7	8	9	10	Final
British Columbia (Perepolkin) 🔨	0	0	2	0	0	0	2	0	0	3	7
Newfoundland (Gushue)	0	0	0	2	0	1	0	1	0	0	4

Sheet C	1	2	3	4	5	6	7	8	9	10	Final
Saskatchewan (Jordison) 🔨	0	1	0	0	1	0	2	1	0	0	5
Nova Scotia (Sifton)	2	0	1	0	0	1	0	0	2	1	7

Sheet D	1	2	3	4	5	6	7	8	9	10	Final
Alberta (Schafer) 🔨	1	0	0	1	0	0	1	0	1	2	6
Quebec (Menard)	0	1	0	0	2	0	0	1	0	0	4

Sheet E	1	2	3	4	5	6	7	8	9	10	Final
Northern Ontario (Currie) 🔨	2	0	0	2	0	3	0	3	X	X	10
Prince Edward Island (Newson)	0	0	1	0	2	0	1	0	X	X	4

Sheet F	1	2	3	4	5	6	7	8	9	10	Final
Yukon (Redlin) 🔨	1	0	1	0	0	0	0	1	0	X	3
Manitoba (Fry)	0	1	0	1	1	2	1	0	1	X	7

=== Tiebreakers ===
==== Tiebreaker #1 ====
Sheet A	1	2	3	4	5	6	7	8	9	10	11	Final
Ontario (Ferris) 🔨	0	2	0	0	3	0	0	2	0	0	0	7
Nova Scotia (Sifton)	0	0	0	1	0	3	0	0	2	1	1	8

Player percentages
Ontario		Nova Scotia	
Bryan Johnson	79%	Kris MacLeod	74%
Shaun Harris	86%	Georg Ernst	89%
Heath McCormick	90%	Graham Eisenhauer	91%
Patrick Ferris	78%	Rob Sifton	78%
Total	83%	Total	83%

Sheet E	1	2	3	4	5	6	7	8	9	10	Final
British Columbia (Perepolkin)	0	0	0	0	0	0	1	0	1	0	2
Northwest Territories (Koe) 🔨	0	0	0	0	0	2	0	0	0	1	3

Player percentages
British Columbia		Northwest Territories	
David Orme	75%	Kevin Cymbalisty	70%
Nathan Munk	71%	Blair Hamer	75%
Rick Sawatsky	83%	Kevin Whitehead	78%
TJ Perepolkin	71%	Jamie Koe	83%
Total	75%	Total	76%

==== Tiebreaker #2 ====
Sheet D	1	2	3	4	5	6	7	8	9	10	Final
Nova Scotia (Sifton)	0	0	0	0	2	0	0	1	1	1	5
Northwest Territories (Koe) 🔨	1	0	1	1	0	0	0	0	0	0	3

Player percentages
Nova Scotia		Northwest Territories	
Kris MacLeod	89%	Kevin Cymbalisty	69%
Georg Ernst	84%	Blair Hamer	85%
Graham Eisenhauer	85%	Kevin Whitehead	79%
Rob Sifton	93%	Jamie Koe	74%
Total	88%	Total	77%

=== Playoffs ===
Semifinal		Final
Northern Ontario	9
Nova Scotia	5	Manitoba	3
		Northern Ontario	8

==== Semifinal ====
Sheet B	1	2	3	4	5	6	7	8	9	10	Final
Northern Ontario (Currie) 🔨	0	2	0	0	2	0	2	0	3	X	9
Nova Scotia (Sifton)	0	0	1	0	0	1	0	3	0	X	5

Player percentages
Northern Ontario		Nova Scotia	
Tyler Oinonen	72%	Kris MacLeod	65%
Andrew Mikkelsen	56%	Georg Ernst	75%
Greg Given	53%	Graham Eisenhauer	56%
Jeff Currie	72%	Rob Sifton	61%
Total	63%	Total	64%

==== Final ====
Sheet A	1	2	3	4	5	6	7	8	9	10	Final
Manitoba (Fry) 🔨	1	0	0	1	0	0	0	1	0	X	3
Northern Ontario (Currie)	0	1	0	0	2	0	1	0	4	X	8

Player percentages
Manitoba		Northern Ontario	
Gilles Pelletier	83%	Tyler Oinonen	85%
Jason Smith	89%	Andrew Mikkelsen	85%
Jimmi Bush	89%	Greg Given	84%
Ryan Fry	67%	Jeff Currie	90%
Total	82%	Total	86%

== Women's ==
The women's field included future Olympic silver medalist Kristie Moore (second for Alberta), future world champion Jeanna Richard (British Columbia) and future Scotties champion Heather Godberson (Alberta).

=== Teams ===
Province / Territory	Skip	Third	Second	Lead
Alberta	Heather Godberson	Carmen Whyte	Kristie Moore	Terelyn Bloor
British Columbia	Jeanna Richard	Michelle Harding	Shalegh Beddington	Denise Byers
Manitoba	Kristy Jenion	Ainsley Holowec	Shea Westcott	Raunora Westcott
New Brunswick	Melissa McClure	Nancy Toner	Brigitte McClure	Bethany Toner
Newfoundland	Heather Strong	Kelli Sharpe	Kim Bourque	Emily Gibbons
Northern Ontario	Elizabeth Eby	Crystal Taylor	Kari MacLean	Kelli Smith
Northwest Territories	Kerry Koe	Shona Barbour	Sheena Yakeleya	Connie Gordon
Nova Scotia	Meredith Doyle	Beth Roach	Lindsay Jennings	Candice MacLean
Ontario	Denna Schell	Sandy Graham	Angela Cowan	Allison Ross
Prince Edward Island	Angela Sutherland	Melanie Ellis	Jennifer Coady	April Hicken
Quebec	Marie-France Larouche	Nancy Belanger	Marie-Eve Letourneau	Valerie Grenier
Saskatchewan	Cindy Street	Jackie Downer	Allison Tanner	Lisa Lewis
Yukon	Kerry Foster	Tracy Bekenes	Kara Kowalyshen	Tia-Jayne Clark

=== Standings ===
Locale	Skip	W	L
Alberta	Heather Godberson	9	3
Nova Scotia	Meredith Doyle	9	3
Newfoundland	Heather Strong	7	5
Ontario	Denna Schell	7	5
Saskatchewan	Cindy Street	7	5
Quebec	Marie-France Larouche	7	5
New Brunswick	Melissa McClure	6	6
British Columbia	Jeanna Richard	6	6
Northern Ontario	Elizabeth Eby	6	6
Northwest Territories	Kerry Koe	5	7
Manitoba	Kristy Jenion	5	7
Yukon	Kerry Foster	3	9
Prince Edward Island	Angela Sutherland	1	11

=== Results ===
==== Draw 1 ====
Sheet A	1	2	3	4	5	6	7	8	9	10	Final
Northwest Territories (Koe) 🔨	2	0	0	3	0	0	1	0	0	0	6
Ontario (Schell)	0	2	1	0	2	1	0	0	1	1	8

Sheet B	1	2	3	4	5	6	7	8	9	10	Final
Quebec (Larouche) 🔨	0	1	0	0	0	1	0	0	1	1	4
British Columbia (Richard)	0	0	1	0	1	0	0	0	0	0	2

Sheet C	1	2	3	4	5	6	7	8	9	10	Final
Nova Scotia (Doyle) 🔨	0	0	0	3	1	2	0	3	X	X	9
Prince Edward Island (Sutherland)	1	1	1	0	0	0	1	0	X	X	4

Sheet D	1	2	3	4	5	6	7	8	9	10	Final
Alberta (Godberson) 🔨	0	0	0	0	0	2	0	2	0	1	5
Saskatchewan (Street)	0	0	0	0	0	0	1	0	1	0	2

Sheet E	1	2	3	4	5	6	7	8	9	10	Final
Northern Ontario (Eby) 🔨	2	0	0	0	0	1	0	1	X	X	4
New Brunswick (McClure)	0	4	2	0	2	0	1	0	X	X	9

Sheet F	1	2	3	4	5	6	7	8	9	10	Final
Manitoba (Jenion) 🔨	0	0	1	0	2	0	0	0	1	1	5
Newfoundland (Strong)	0	0	0	3	0	0	1	0	0	0	4

==== Draw 2 ====
Sheet A	1	2	3	4	5	6	7	8	9	10	Final
Saskatchewan (Street) 🔨	0	0	0	0	3	3	0	2	2	X	10
Manitoba (Jenion)	1	1	3	1	0	0	0	0	0	X	6

Sheet B	1	2	3	4	5	6	7	8	9	10	Final
Yukon (Foster) 🔨	0	0	1	0	0	1	0	1	0	0	3
Newfoundland (Strong)	1	0	0	1	0	0	2	0	1	2	7

Sheet C	1	2	3	4	5	6	7	8	9	10	Final
Ontario (Schell) 🔨	1	0	1	0	3	0	1	0	4	X	10
Quebec (Larouche)	0	2	0	1	0	2	0	1	0	X	6

Sheet D	1	2	3	4	5	6	7	8	9	10	Final
Northwest Territories (Koe) 🔨	1	0	0	0	1	0	0	1	2	X	5
Nova Scotia (Doyle)	0	0	0	1	0	1	1	0	0	X	3

Sheet E	1	2	3	4	5	6	7	8	9	10	11	Final
British Columbia (Richard) 🔨	1	0	0	0	1	1	0	0	1	1	0	5
Alberta (Godberson)	0	0	0	1	0	0	3	1	0	0	1	6

Sheet F	1	2	3	4	5	6	7	8	9	10	Final
Prince Edward Island (Sutherland) 🔨	0	0	0	1	0	0	X	X	X	X	1
New Brunswick (McClure)	2	1	1	0	2	2	X	X	X	X	8

==== Draw 3 ====
Sheet A	1	2	3	4	5	6	7	8	9	10	11	Final
Newfoundland (Strong) 🔨	0	1	0	2	0	0	1	0	1	0	0	5
Northern Ontario (Eby)	0	0	1	0	0	2	0	1	0	1	1	6

Sheet B	1	2	3	4	5	6	7	8	9	10	Final
Yukon (Foster) 🔨	2	0	0	0	1	0	0	1	0	X	4
Saskatchewan (Street)	0	1	2	2	0	3	1	0	1	X	10

Sheet C	1	2	3	4	5	6	7	8	9	10	Final
New Brunswick (McClure) 🔨	1	0	0	1	0	0	0	1	X	X	3
Northwest Territories (Koe)	0	2	2	0	3	1	1	0	X	X	9

Sheet D	1	2	3	4	5	6	7	8	9	10	Final
Manitoba (Jenion) 🔨	0	0	1	0	0	1	0	0	2	X	4
British Columbia (Richard)	1	1	0	0	2	0	0	2	0	X	6

Sheet E	1	2	3	4	5	6	7	8	9	10	Final
Nova Scotia (Doyle) 🔨	1	0	1	1	0	0	2	1	1	X	7
Ontario (Schell)	0	0	0	0	3	1	0	0	0	X	4

Sheet F	1	2	3	4	5	6	7	8	9	10	11	Final
Alberta (Godberson) 🔨	0	0	0	2	0	0	1	0	0	1	0	4
Quebec (Larouche)	0	1	0	0	0	1	0	1	1	0	1	5

==== Draw 4 ====
Sheet A	1	2	3	4	5	6	7	8	9	10	Final
Nova Scotia (Doyle) 🔨	1	0	2	1	2	0	0	0	1	X	7
New Brunswick (McClure)	0	2	0	0	0	1	1	0	0	X	4

Sheet B	1	2	3	4	5	6	7	8	9	10	Final
Ontario (Schell) 🔨	2	0	1	0	0	2	0	0	0	X	5
Alberta (Godberson)	0	1	0	0	3	0	2	1	2	X	9

Sheet C	1	2	3	4	5	6	7	8	9	10	Final
Saskatchewan (Street) 🔨	1	0	0	1	0	0	1	2	0	0	5
Northern Ontario (Eby)	0	2	0	0	0	1	0	0	2	1	6

Sheet D	1	2	3	4	5	6	7	8	9	10	Final
Prince Edward Island (Sutherland) 🔨	1	0	1	0	1	0	0	0	2	0	5
Newfoundland (Strong)	0	0	0	1	0	1	2	1	0	2	7

Sheet E	1	2	3	4	5	6	7	8	9	10	Final
Quebec (Larouche) 🔨	0	1	0	2	1	0	0	1	0	0	5
Manitoba (Jenion)	0	0	1	0	0	2	2	0	2	1	8

Sheet F	1	2	3	4	5	6	7	8	9	10	Final
British Columbia (Richard) 🔨	2	2	0	3	0	4	X	X	X	X	11
Yukon (Foster)	0	0	1	0	1	0	X	X	X	X	2

==== Draw 5 ====
Sheet A	1	2	3	4	5	6	7	8	9	10	Final
Yukon (Foster) 🔨	1	1	0	0	1	5	1	X	X	X	9
Quebec (Larouche)	0	0	0	1	0	0	0	X	X	X	1

Sheet B	1	2	3	4	5	6	7	8	9	10	Final
Northern Ontario (Eby) 🔨	0	1	1	1	0	2	0	1	0	0	6
British Columbia (Richard)	1	0	0	0	3	0	1	0	1	1	7

Sheet C	1	2	3	4	5	6	7	8	9	10	Final
Manitoba (Jenion) 🔨	2	0	0	0	2	0	0	1	0	0	5
Alberta (Godberson)	0	0	0	2	0	0	2	0	2	1	7

Sheet D	1	2	3	4	5	6	7	8	9	10	Final
New Brunswick (McClure) 🔨	1	0	0	0	1	0	0	0	1	X	3
Ontario (Schell)	0	1	1	1	0	0	1	2	0	X	6

Sheet E	1	2	3	4	5	6	7	8	9	10	Final
Newfoundland (Strong) 🔨	2	1	0	0	0	1	2	0	3	X	9
Northwest Territories (Koe)	0	0	0	1	0	0	0	2	0	X	3

Sheet F	1	2	3	4	5	6	7	8	9	10	Final
Saskatchewan (Street) 🔨	2	1	0	0	2	0	0	1	0	X	6
Prince Edward Island (Sutherland)	0	0	1	0	0	2	0	0	1	X	4

==== Draw 6 ====
Sheet A	1	2	3	4	5	6	7	8	9	10	Final
Northwest Territories (Koe) 🔨	1	0	0	1	0	1	0	0	0	X	3
Saskatchewan (Street)	0	0	0	0	3	0	1	1	1	X	6

Sheet B	1	2	3	4	5	6	7	8	9	10	Final
Quebec (Larouche) 🔨	2	0	1	0	0	1	1	1	2	X	8
Northern Ontario (Eby)	0	2	0	1	1	0	0	0	0	X	4

Sheet C	1	2	3	4	5	6	7	8	9	10	Final
Nova Scotia (Doyle) 🔨	0	1	0	2	0	0	2	0	3	X	8
Newfoundland (Strong)	0	0	0	0	0	2	0	1	0	X	3

Sheet D	1	2	3	4	5	6	7	8	9	10	Final
Alberta (Godberson) 🔨	0	0	0	2	1	0	0	4	3	X	10
Yukon (Foster)	0	0	0	0	0	1	1	0	0	X	2

Sheet E	1	2	3	4	5	6	7	8	9	10	Final
Prince Edward Island (Sutherland) 🔨	1	0	0	0	0	1	0	0	1	X	3
British Columbia (Richard)	0	2	1	0	0	0	1	1	0	X	5

Sheet F	1	2	3	4	5	6	7	8	9	10	Final
Ontario (Schell) 🔨	3	2	0	1	0	0	1	0	0	0	7
Manitoba (Jenion)	0	0	3	0	1	2	0	1	0	2	9

==== Draw 7 ====
Sheet A	1	2	3	4	5	6	7	8	9	10	Final
Northern Ontario (Eby) 🔨	1	0	0	2	0	0	4	0	0	0	7
Alberta (Godberson)	0	1	0	0	1	1	0	1	1	1	6

Sheet B	1	2	3	4	5	6	7	8	9	10	Final
Newfoundland (Strong) 🔨	0	0	0	1	0	0	1	0	6	X	8
New Brunswick (McClure)	0	0	0	0	0	2	0	1	0	X	3

Sheet C	1	2	3	4	5	6	7	8	9	10	Final
Prince Edward Island (Sutherland) 🔨	0	2	0	2	0	0	3	0	0	X	7
Quebec (Larouche)	1	0	3	0	1	1	0	0	3	X	9

Sheet D	1	2	3	4	5	6	7	8	9	10	Final
Saskatchewan (Street) 🔨	1	0	1	1	0	0	1	0	2	0	6
Nova Scotia (Doyle)	0	2	0	0	1	0	0	3	0	1	7

Sheet E	1	2	3	4	5	6	7	8	9	10	Final
Yukon (Foster) 🔨	2	0	1	0	0	2	0	0	1	1	7
Manitoba (Jenion)	0	3	0	1	0	0	1	1	0	0	6

Sheet F	1	2	3	4	5	6	7	8	9	10	Final
British Columbia (Richard) 🔨	2	1	0	0	0	2	0	1	0	X	6
Northwest Territories (Koe)	0	0	1	0	1	0	1	0	1	X	4

==== Draw 8 ====
Sheet A	1	2	3	4	5	6	7	8	9	10	Final
Ontario (Schell) 🔨	1	0	2	0	2	0	3	1	X	X	9
Yukon (Foster)	0	1	0	1	0	1	0	0	X	X	3

Sheet B	1	2	3	4	5	6	7	8	9	10	Final
Nova Scotia (Doyle) 🔨	0	1	0	0	1	0	0	2	0	1	5
British Columbia (Richard)	0	0	0	2	0	1	0	0	1	0	4

Sheet C	1	2	3	4	5	6	7	8	9	10	Final
Quebec (Larouche) 🔨	0	1	0	1	0	3	0	2	0	X	7
Northwest Territories (Koe)	0	0	1	0	1	0	1	0	0	X	3

Sheet D	1	2	3	4	5	6	7	8	9	10	Final
Manitoba (Jenion) 🔨	1	0	0	1	0	1	0	2	0	X	5
Northern Ontario (Eby)	0	0	1	0	0	0	1	0	1	X	3

Sheet E	1	2	3	4	5	6	7	8	9	10	Final
New Brunswick (McClure) 🔨	2	0	1	1	1	0	1	1	1	X	8
Saskatchewan (Street)	0	1	0	0	0	1	0	0	0	X	2

Sheet F	1	2	3	4	5	6	7	8	9	10	Final
Alberta (Godberson) 🔨	2	0	0	2	0	1	2	0	3	X	10
Prince Edward Island (Sutherland)	0	0	1	0	3	0	0	1	0	X	5

==== Draw 9 ====
Sheet A	1	2	3	4	5	6	7	8	9	10	Final
British Columbia (Richard) 🔨	1	0	0	0	1	0	1	0	1	0	4
New Brunswick (McClure)	0	0	0	1	0	1	0	3	0	3	8

Sheet B	1	2	3	4	5	6	7	8	9	10	Final
Prince Edward Island (Sutherland) 🔨	1	0	0	0	0	0	0	1	1	0	3
Manitoba (Jenion)	0	0	1	1	0	0	0	0	0	3	5

Sheet C	1	2	3	4	5	6	7	8	9	10	Final
Newfoundland (Strong) 🔨	1	0	0	2	0	2	0	0	0	2	7
Ontario (Schell)	0	2	0	0	1	0	2	1	0	0	6

Sheet D	1	2	3	4	5	6	7	8	9	10	Final
Northwest Territories (Koe) 🔨	0	0	1	0	0	1	0	0	2	X	4
Alberta (Godberson)	0	1	0	0	1	0	3	1	0	X	6

Sheet E	1	2	3	4	5	6	7	8	9	10	Final
Quebec (Larouche) 🔨	1	0	1	0	0	2	2	2	0	X	8
Nova Scotia (Doyle)	0	1	0	1	1	0	0	0	1	X	4

Sheet F	1	2	3	4	5	6	7	8	9	10	Final
Northern Ontario (Eby) 🔨	3	1	0	0	2	0	1	0	2	X	9
Yukon (Foster)	0	0	1	0	0	2	0	1	0	X	4

==== Draw 10 ====
Sheet A	1	2	3	4	5	6	7	8	9	10	11	Final
Alberta (Godberson) 🔨	0	0	1	0	0	0	1	0	3	0	1	6
Nova Scotia (Doyle)	0	0	0	0	0	1	0	2	0	2	0	5

Sheet B	1	2	3	4	5	6	7	8	9	10	11	Final
Manitoba (Jenion) 🔨	1	0	1	0	0	0	1	0	1	1	0	5
Northwest Territories (Koe)	0	1	0	0	2	0	0	2	0	0	1	6

Sheet C	1	2	3	4	5	6	7	8	9	10	Final
Yukon (Foster) 🔨	0	0	3	1	0	1	0	2	0	0	7
Prince Edward Island (Sutherland)	1	1	0	0	1	0	1	0	0	2	6

Sheet D	1	2	3	4	5	6	7	8	9	10	11	Final
New Brunswick (McClure) 🔨	0	1	0	1	0	0	1	0	0	1	0	4
Quebec (Larouche)	0	0	1	0	2	0	0	1	0	0	1	5

Sheet E	1	2	3	4	5	6	7	8	9	10	Final
Ontario (Schell) 🔨	0	1	0	0	0	1	0	1	0	0	3
Northern Ontario (Eby)	0	0	1	0	1	0	1	0	0	2	5

Sheet F	1	2	3	4	5	6	7	8	9	10	Final
Newfoundland (Strong) 🔨	0	0	2	0	0	0	0	1	0	0	3
Saskatchewan (Street)	0	1	0	1	0	0	1	0	0	1	4

==== Draw 11 ====
Sheet A	1	2	3	4	5	6	7	8	9	10	Final
Nova Scotia (Doyle) 🔨	0	2	0	0	1	0	0	2	0	3	8
Manitoba (Jenion)	1	0	1	0	0	1	2	0	1	0	6

Sheet B	1	2	3	4	5	6	7	8	9	10	Final
New Brunswick (McClure) 🔨	0	0	0	0	3	0	0	X	X	X	3
Alberta (Godberson)	1	0	1	2	0	0	6	X	X	X	10

Sheet C	1	2	3	4	5	6	7	8	9	10	Final
Northwest Territories (Koe) 🔨	2	0	3	0	1	0	1	0	1	2	10
Yukon (Foster)	0	1	0	1	0	2	0	2	0	0	6

Sheet D	1	2	3	4	5	6	7	8	9	10	11	Final
Prince Edward Island (Sutherland) 🔨	0	1	2	0	1	0	0	2	0	1	0	7
Northern Ontario (Eby)	2	0	0	2	0	0	1	0	2	0	1	8

Sheet E	1	2	3	4	5	6	7	8	9	10	Final
Saskatchewan (Street) 🔨	1	0	0	1	0	1	0	0	X	X	3
Ontario (Schell)	0	1	2	0	2	0	1	2	X	X	8

Sheet F	1	2	3	4	5	6	7	8	9	10	Final
British Columbia (Richard) 🔨	0	4	0	1	0	0	0	0	1	X	6
Newfoundland (Strong)	0	0	1	0	1	1	0	1	0	X	4

==== Draw 12 ====
Sheet A	1	2	3	4	5	6	7	8	9	10	Final
Northern Ontario (Eby) 🔨	2	0	1	0	0	1	0	0	0	0	4
Northwest Territories (Koe)	0	1	0	1	1	0	1	0	1	1	6

Sheet B	1	2	3	4	5	6	7	8	9	10	11	Final
Newfoundland (Strong) 🔨	0	0	2	0	0	0	1	0	1	0	1	5
Quebec (Larouche)	0	0	0	1	0	1	0	1	0	1	0	4

Sheet C	1	2	3	4	5	6	7	8	9	10	Final
Saskatchewan (Street) 🔨	0	1	1	2	0	2	1	0	1	X	8
British Columbia (Richard)	1	0	0	0	1	0	0	1	0	X	3

Sheet D	1	2	3	4	5	6	7	8	9	10	Final
Ontario (Schell) 🔨	1	0	0	1	2	0	1	1	0	X	6
Prince Edward Island (Sutherland)	0	0	0	0	0	1	0	0	1	X	2

Sheet E	1	2	3	4	5	6	7	8	9	10	11	Final
Manitoba (Jenion) 🔨	0	0	0	3	0	0	1	0	2	0	0	6
New Brunswick (McClure)	1	0	0	0	1	1	0	1	0	2	1	7

Sheet F	1	2	3	4	5	6	7	8	9	10	Final
Yukon (Foster) 🔨	0	0	0	1	0	1	0	X	X	X	2
Nova Scotia (Doyle)	1	2	1	0	4	0	4	X	X	X	12

==== Draw 13 ====
Sheet A	1	2	3	4	5	6	7	8	9	10	Final
New Brunswick (McClure) 🔨	1	0	0	1	3	1	1	0	2	X	9
Yukon (Foster)	0	0	2	0	0	0	0	1	0	X	3

Sheet B	1	2	3	4	5	6	7	8	9	10	Final
British Columbia (Richard) 🔨	0	0	2	0	2	0	0	1	0	1	6
Ontario (Schell)	0	2	0	1	0	2	1	0	1	0	7

Sheet C	1	2	3	4	5	6	7	8	9	10	Final
Northern Ontario (Eby) 🔨	0	0	1	1	1	0	2	0	1	0	6
Nova Scotia (Doyle)	1	3	0	0	0	1	0	1	0	1	7

Sheet D	1	2	3	4	5	6	7	8	9	10	Final
Alberta (Godberson) 🔨	0	0	2	0	0	1	0	2	0	0	5
Newfoundland (Strong)	0	2	0	0	1	0	2	0	0	1	6

Sheet E	1	2	3	4	5	6	7	8	9	10	11	Final
Northwest Territories (Koe) 🔨	1	1	0	1	0	0	1	0	0	3	0	7
Prince Edward Island (Sutherland)	0	0	1	0	0	1	0	3	2	0	1	8

Sheet F	1	2	3	4	5	6	7	8	9	10	Final
Quebec (Larouche) 🔨	0	0	1	0	2	0	2	0	0	0	5
Saskatchewan (Street)	0	0	0	2	0	2	0	2	1	1	8

=== Tiebreakers ===
==== Tiebreaker #1 ====
Sheet B	1	2	3	4	5	6	7	8	9	10	Final
Quebec (Larouche)	0	0	1	0	0	0	2	0	X	X	3
Ontario (Schell) 🔨	1	2	0	1	1	1	0	3	X	X	9

Player percentages
Quebec		Ontario	
Valerie Grenier	59%	Allison Ross	66%
Marie-Eve Letourneau	77%	Angela Cowan	70%
Nancy Belanger	64%	Sandy Graham	86%
Marie-France Larouche	48%	Denna Schell	81%
Total	62%	Total	76%

Sheet F	1	2	3	4	5	6	7	8	9	10	Final
Newfoundland (Strong)	0	0	1	0	2	0	0	1	0	X	4
Saskatchewan (Street) 🔨	1	1	0	1	0	1	2	0	2	X	8

Player percentages
Newfoundland		Saskatchewan	
Emily Gibbons	68%	Lisa Lewis	78%
Kim Bourque	63%	Allison Tanner	72%
Kelli Sharpe	76%	Jackie Downer	64%
Heather Strong	54%	Cindy Street	65%
Total	65%	Total	70%

==== Tiebreaker #2 ====
Sheet C	1	2	3	4	5	6	7	8	9	10	Final
Saskatchewan (Street)	1	2	0	2	0	2	0	0	0	1	8
Ontario (Schell) 🔨	0	0	1	0	2	0	1	1	1	0	6

Player percentages
Saskatchewan		Ontario	
Lisa Lewis	78%	Allison Ross	74%
Allison Tanner	70%	Angela Cowan	76%
Jackie Downer	69%	Sandy Graham	78%
Cindy Street	78%	Denna Schell	54%
Total	73%	Total	70%

=== Playoffs ===
Semifinal		Final
Saskatchewan	4
Nova Scotia	3	Alberta	7
		Saskatchewan	5

==== Semifinal ====
Sheet E	1	2	3	4	5	6	7	8	9	10	Final
Saskatchewan (Street)	0	0	0	1	0	1	0	0	1	1	4
Nova Scotia (Doyle) 🔨	1	0	0	0	1	0	1	0	0	0	3

Player percentages
Saskatchewan		Nova Scotia	
Lisa Lewis	84%	Candice MacLean	80%
Allison Tanner	79%	Lindsay Jennings	75%
Jackie Downer	78%	Beth Roach	70%
Cindy Street	78%	Meredith Doyle	63%
Total	79%	Total	72%

==== Final ====
Sheet A	1	2	3	4	5	6	7	8	9	10	11	Final
Alberta (Godberson) 🔨	1	0	0	0	2	0	0	1	0	1	2	7
Saskatchewan (Street)	0	2	0	1	0	0	1	0	1	0	0	5

Player percentages
Alberta		Saskatchewan	
Terelyn Bloor	85%	Lisa Lewis	86%
Kristie Moore	74%	Allison Tanner	80%
Carmen Whyte	88%	Jackie Downer	77%
Heather Godberson	75%	Cindy Street	79%
Total	80%	Total	80%

== Qualification ==
=== Ontario ===
The Teranet Ontario Junior Curling Championships were held in Newmarket, with the finals on January 14.

Denna Schell of Cannington won the women's event over Milton's Kirsten Harmark in the final, 5–4. In the men's final, Pat Ferris of Sutton defeated the Ottawa Curling Club's Ray Busato, 5–4.
