= Duluth Curling Club =

Curling club in Duluth, Minnesota

- Location: 327 Harbor Drive; Duluth, MN 55802
- Arena: Duluth Entertainment Convention Center (DECC)
- Host club: 46.78197°N 92.09821°W

Information
- Established: 1891
- Club type: Dedicated Ice
- USCA region: Minnesota
- Website: http://www.duluthcurlingclub.org/

The Duluth Curling Club (DCC) is a curling club located in Duluth, Minnesota, United States. DCC is the curling club with the second largest membership in the United States.

== History ==
The Duluth Curling Club was organized in 1891. The original building was a tent between two retaining walls on East Superior Street downtown, but it was carried away by a blizzard that winter. Another building at Wallace and Arrowhead was then converted for use, until a structure was purpose-built in 1897 at 14th Avenue East and the waterfront. The Club has been located at the Duluth Entertainment Convention Center (DECC) since 1976.

The club hosted the U.S. Grand Prix in December 2016, a made-for-television tournament that is broadcast on NBCSN's Curling Night in America.

== Leagues ==
Through the curling season Duluth Curling Club members participate in leagues including Men's, Women's, Open (mixed men and women), Juniors, and Instructional.

== National and international championships ==
The Duluth Curling Club has hosted two World Championships, the US Olympic Trials, and numerous National events. Two DCC members have been inducted into the Curling Hall of Fame, for service to the sport. Numerous members have participated in and won State and National Championships over the years, and even a few World and Olympic Championships. The Men’s Club Championship has been contested annually since at least 1909

== Bonspiels ==
The Duluth Curling Club hosts many bonspiels throughout the season as fundraisers or tour sanctioned events:

- Turkey Spiel (Members only)
- Ladies Fun Spiel
- Elizabeth Busche Memorial Junior Bonspiel
- Bruce Bennett Men’s Over 40
- USWCA All American
- Hoops Open Bonspiel
- Dunlop Mixed Bonspiel
- House of Hearts Charity Bonspiel
- Duluth Cash Spiel

== Notable members ==
- John Shuster
- Tyler George
- John Landsteiner
- Wally Gilbert
- Cory Thiesse
- Korey Dropkin
