= World Curling Tour =

Group of curling bonspiels (tournaments)

- Sport: Curling
- Founded: 1992
- Founder: Ed Lukowich
- Website: https://worldcurlingtour.org

The World Curling Tour (WCT) is a group of curling bonspiels featuring the best male, female, and mixed doubles curlers in the world.

== History ==
The World Curling Tour was founded by former World Champion Ed Lukowich, with later assistance from John Kawaja.

The World Curling Tour commenced in 1992, with men's events only at first. It replaced the "Canadian Curling Tour" held the previous season. The first season consisted of 48 events (with only one outside Canada), and was sponsored by Seagram's distillery. Teams earned points in every event with the top 30 qualifying for the season ending "V.O. Cup", today known as the Players' Championship. Its first president and CEO was Lukowich. The first two events were held on the first weekend of October 1992, the Red Carpet Classic in Regina, Saskatchewan and a qualifier for the Coca-Cola Classic in Winnipeg.

In 2001, the WCT introduced a series of Grand Slam events for men which was later followed in 2006 by Grand Slam events for women. These became known as the Grand Slam of Curling and featured large payouts. Originally, curlers who participated in Grand Slam events were obliged to not participate in their respective Brier playdowns, however this was quickly rescinded.

Most WCT events are held in the Fall, and early Winter to avoid competing with the Brier and Scotties playdowns.

The WCT is experimenting with length of games in two interesting ways. The first is that the games are only eight ends long with a 4th end break. The second is that the time clocks only count "thinking time", so the clock goes off when the players throw the rock. The reason is that time clocks, an innovation created to speed up the game, would stop as soon as the stone stopped. With the old system where teams were given 73 minutes of time if a team was losing, they would throw more draw shots which take time. The team that is winning throws more hits and thus ends up with more time if needed. So the WCT moved to "Thinking time" to even out this discrepancy. With this new system, each team is given 40 minutes of "Thinking Time" plus an additional 5 minutes if the game goes to an extra end. The system is now a standard in Curling Canada championship events, though with a 38-minute limit for standard 10-end curling (four minutes for extra ends) and 22 minutes for mixed doubles. The 2018 Canada Cup experimented with breaking the time down by ends — four minutes per end in the first half of the game, and four minutes, 15 seconds in the second half; if time runs out, the offending team can play no more rocks in the end.

The team with the most winnings at the end of the year wins the Founders Trophy. The winners in 2007 were Kevin Martin's team who won a total of $176,000.

A separate Women's World Curling Tour existed, until it was merged into the WCT in 2005.

Each of the bonspiel events on the World Curling Tour lasts for approximately 3 days with a final payoff ranging in the thousands of dollars for the winners.

There were 7 major men's and women's tournaments that were held throughout the year, each with a final cash prize of at least $100,000 for the winning team. These were the Elite 10, the Masters, the Tour Challenge, the National, the Canadian Open, the Players' Championship, and the Champions Cup. Together, these events were known as Grand Slam events because of the large payoff that is associated with them as well as the number of high-level curlers that play in these tournaments. These events are now part of the World Team Ranking System. There also used to be 2 more Grand Slam events for the women called the Sobeys Slam and Wayden Transportation Ladies Classic but these were discontinued in 2010.

On October 2, 2006, the license of rights for the Grand Slam of Curling was sold to Insight Sports Ltd. but was later sold again in August 2012 to Rogers Communications. The WCT naming rights were then sold to Asham, a long time contributor to the sport, until 2014 and because of this, the World Curling Tour was renamed Asham's World Curling Tour. The Grand Slam was originally simply called the Grand Slam of Curling until 2008 when the rights were sold by the CBC to Capital One bank which renamed the Grand Slam the Capital One Grand Slam of Curling. Unlike the other World Curling Tour events, these Grand Slams they are played in 8-end games as opposed to the usual 10 end games found in the other WCT events. Another new rule that was first put into practice at the men's nationals in 2014 is the 5 rock rule which increased the 4 rock rule and free guard zone rule by another rock. This changed the starting strategy of the game as the team with the hammer was able to throw up two guards uncontested instead of the usual 1 allowed with the previously used 4 rock rule. Through the addition of the Grand Slam events and the new rule changes, the WCT is rapidly becoming a well known series to sports fans worldwide.

On June 28, 2017, the Canadian-based World Curling Tour officially merged with the European and Asian based Curling Champions Tour to create a worldwide entity focused on growing the game on the international stage. The World Curling Tour World rights holder is now the Zurich Switzerland-based company CCT Event GmbH. This merger has also led to the growth of a Mixed Doubles tour, along with adding Junior and Wheelchair curling tours to expand the offering.

Throughout the 2010s, the Men's and Women's World Curling Tour began in early August with the Hokkaido Bank Curling Classic and had events taking place all throughout the curling season until the Champions Cup in late April. Following the COVID-19 pandemic that cancelled the majority of the events during the 2020–21 season, a large majority of the tour events that made up the WCT left the tour, leaving only a handful of European events. The rest of the events continued to be played on the new World Team Ranking System.

== Events ==
=== Men ===
As of the 2023–2024 curling season

Week	Event	Location	Purse
1	Morioka Ice Rink Memorial Cup	Morioka, Japan	¥ 195,000
11	Baden Masters	Baden, Switzerland	CHF 35,000
17	WCT Tallinn Mens Challenger	Tallinn, Estonia	€ 3,000
18	Prague Open	Prague, Czech Republic	€ 4,000
21	WCT Latvian International Challenger	Tukums, Latvia	€ 3,000
21	GP Bern Inter	Bern, Switzerland	CHF 18,100
22	Blazing Leaves	Bridgeport, Connecticut	$4,500 (US)
23	Prague Classic	Prague, Czech Republic	€ 13,500
28	WCT Łódź Men's International	Łódź, Poland	€ 4,000
34	Belgium Men's Challenger	Zemst, Belgium	€ 2,800

=== Women ===
As of the 2023–2024 curling season

Week	Event	Location	Purse
17	Prague Ladies International	Prague, Czech Republic	€ 7,500
21	WCT Latvian International Challenger	Tukums, Latvia	€ 3,000
22	Blazing Leaves	Bridgeport, Connecticut	$3,200 (US)
22	WCT Tallinn Ladies Challenger	Tallinn, Estonia	€ 3,000
30	New Year Medalist Curling	Miyota, Japan	¥ 2,000,000
32	Cortina Curling Cup	Cortina d'Ampezzo, Italy	€ 20,000
34	International Bernese Ladies Cup	Bern, Switzerland	€ 4,000
38	Prague Open	Prague, Czech Republic	€ 3,000

=== Mixed doubles ===
As of the 2023–2024 curling season

Week	Event	Location	Purse
14	Mixed Doubles Prague Open	Prague, Czech Republic	€ 3,500
16	WCT Tallinn Mixed Doubles International	Tallinn, Estonia	€ 3,325
19	WCT Austrian Mixed Doubles Cup	Kitzbühel, Austria	€ 3,200
21	WCT Mixed Doubles Cup Geising	Geising, Germany	€ 2,000
22	WCT Slovakia Mixed Doubles Cup I	Bratislava, Slovakia	€ 2,300
23	WCT Mixed Doubles Łódź	Łódź, Poland	€ 3,500
25	WCT Latvian Mixed Doubles Curling Cup I	Riga, Latvia	
34	Gefle Mixed Doubles Cup	Gävle, Sweden	€ 4,500
39	Hvidovre Mixed Doubles Cup	Hvidovre, Denmark	€3,700
41	WCT Slovakia Mixed Doubles Cup II	Bratislava, Slovakia	
44	WCT Latvian Mixed Doubles Curling Cup II	Riga, Latvia	

== See also ==
- List of teams on the World Curling Tour
- Ontario Curling Tour
