= Mike Jakubo (curler) =

Canadian curler

Michael Jakubo (pronounced "JACK-u-bo"; born November 17, 1982, in Sudbury, Ontario, Canada) is a Canadian professional curler from Garson, Ontario. He is the skip of Team Jakubo, and competed in the 2014–15 World Curling Tour. He represented Northern Ontario at the 2005 Tim Hortons Brier and the 2009 Tim Hortons Brier.

The son of former NHL hockey player Mike Jakubo, he is employed as a chartered accountant with Edward A. Jakubo, CA. He was elected to Greater Sudbury City Council in the 2014 municipal election, representing Ward 7, and has served as chair of the council's finance committee. He announced in December 2021 that he will not run for reelection in the 2022 municipal election.
