= Jeff Currie =

Canadian curler

- Curler

Team
- Curling club: Port Arthur CC, Thunder Bay, ON
- Skip: Joe Polo
- Third: Jeff Currie
- Second: Jared Zezel
- Lead: Derek Benson

Curling career
- Member Association: Northern Ontario
- Brier: 1 (2014)

Jeff Currie (born c. 1976) is a Canadian curler from Thunder Bay, Ontario. He is a former Canadian Junior champion. He currently curls for the Eveleth, Minnesota-based Joe Polo rink on the World Curling Tour.

During his junior career, Currie won just one Northern Ontario provincial junior title, in 1996 defeating Dusty Jakomait in the provincial junior final. Currie made his lone provincial junior title count at the 1996 Canadian Junior Curling Championships representing Northern Ontario. Currie skipped a rink which consisted of Greg Given, Andrew Mikkelsen and Tyler Oinonen. The team finished the round robin of the event in 2nd place, with an 8-4 record. They then defeated Nova Scotia's Rob Sifton in the semi-final and then Manitoba's Ryan Fry in the final to claim the championship. The win earned the team a spot at the 1996 World Junior Curling Championships, representing Canada. At the World Juniors, the rink finished the round robin in a 3-way tie for fourth place with a 5-4 record. They had to beat the United States' Travis Way and Norway's Torger Nergård to get into the playoffs, only to lose in their semi-final match against Switzerland's Ralph Stöckli. In the bronze medal game, they lost again, this time against Germany's Sebastian Stock. The team finished outside of the medals, in 4th. This was only the third time that Canada had finished outside the medals until then.

After his junior career, Currie joined the Larry Pineau rink as third before becoming a skip again in the early 2000s. Since then, Currie has won a handful of World Curling Tour events, most recently winning the 2013 Bernick's Miller Lite Open. Currie did not win a Northern Ontario men's title until 2014, helped by the absence of defending champion Brad Jacobs who was preparing for the 2014 Winter Olympics during the provincials. Currie's rink of Mike McCarville, Colin Koivula and Jamie Childs won the provincial by defeating fellow Port Arthur Curling Club rink Brian Adams, Jr. in the final.
