= Grand Slam of Curling =

Series of curling bonspiels that are part of the World Curling Tour

- Established: 2001–02 (Men's); 2006–07 (Women's)

The Grand Slam of Curling (formerly branded as the Pinty's Grand Slam of Curling for sponsorship reasons) is a series of curling bonspiels that were formerly part of the annual World Curling Tour. Grand Slam events offer a purse of at least CAD$100,000, and feature the best teams from across Canada and around the World. The Grand Slam was instituted during the 2001–02 season for men and 2006–07 for women (with the 2006 Players' Championship also considered a Slam), but some of the Grand Slam events have longer histories as bonspiels.

The Grand Slam season consists of five men's and women's events. The original four events (Masters, Open, National, and Players' Championship) are considered to be "majors". The other slam (Tour Challenge) has a unique format that sets it apart from other events in the series.

== History ==
In 2001, many male curlers were upset with the Canadian Curling Association (CCA). Their complaints included the long length of the curling season, not getting any prize money at the Brier, the national men's curling championship, which generated millions for the CCA, and the inability to have sponsors at the Brier. Eighteen of the top twenty men's teams in the country, known as the "Original 18", agreed to boycott the Brier from 2001 to 2003 and created the Grand Slam of Curling. The original 18 skips were Dave Boehmer, Kerry Burtnyk, Pierre Charette, Glen Despins, Dale Duguid, Bert Gretzinger, Glenn Howard, Bruce Korte, Allan Lyburn, William Lyburn, Kevin Martin, Greg McAulay, Wayne Middaugh, Kevin Park, Brent Pierce, Vic Peters, Peter Steski and Jeff Stoughton.

The Grand Slam of Curling began in the 2001–02 curling season with four events: the Canadian Open, Masters, National, and Players' Championship, the four "majors".

After the merger of the Women's Tour and the WCT, the 2006 Players' Championship featured a women's event for the first time, and was considered a Slam for the women too. In the 2006–07 curling season, several existing women's events were designated as Grand Slams, but were not operated by the Grand Slam of Curling. Grand Slam games also got reduced to eight ends that season.

Logo used from c. 2012 to 2024

In 2012, the Grand Slam of Curling was acquired by Rogers Media via its Sportsnet subsidiary. As such, Sportsnet became the main media rightsholder of the series, although CBC Sports would still carry championship rounds of selected events.

In 2017, Yare TV began broadcasting online streams of the Grand Slams, opening up access to fans outside of Canada.

Under this new ownership, the separate women's Grand Slams were phased out, with women's divisions added to existing men's Grand Slams. New Grand Slam events were also added: the Elite 10 in the 2014–15 curling season and the Tour Challenge and Champions Cup in the 2015–16 curling season. A women's division was added to the Elite 10 in the 2018–19 curling season, achieving for the first time equal number of events, prize money, and television time for men and women. The Elite 10 was dropped the next season, bringing the number of events to six.

The COVID-19 pandemic cancelled the remaining two slams of the 2019-20 curling season and all but the remaining two slams of the 2020–21 curling season. The 2020–21 season was supposed to include the first international Grand Slam, the Canadian Open (renamed to the Open) to be held in Las Vegas, Nevada, United States, but that too was cancelled along with the Tour Challenge that season. The Slam tour was back to normal for the 2022–23 season with six events, however it would be the last season for the Champions Cup which was discontinued.

In April 2024, it was announced that a consortium known as The Curling Group had acquired the Grand Slam of Curling. The group includes Jennifer Jones, John Morris and former American football player-turned curler Jared Allen, and Marc Bulger. Sportsnet will remain the Canadian broadcaster of the tour under a multi-year agreement of unspecified length.

In 2026, the Grand Slam of Curling's parent company The Curling Group introduced the Rock League, which consists of six franchised teams consisting of both males and females who compete against each other in a league format.

Also in 2026, the series removed the tier two events, and re-branded several of the slams. Select tour events were designated as qualifier in order to give teams a berth into the slams. These include the Shorty Jenkins Classic, Karuizawa International, Prestige Hotels & Resorts Curling Classic, ATB Okotoks Classic (men), Autumn Gold Curling Classic (women), the Saville U25 Challenge, Stu Sells 1824 Halifax Classic, St. Paul Cashspiel, Swiss Chalet Women's Curling Stadium Spiel (women), Stu Sells Oakville Tankard, and Henderson Metal Fall Classic (men). This was accompanied by a shift in the GSOC schedule to occur mostly in the fall, in order to accommodate the Rock League. Ahead of the season, The Curling Group announced that the series would return to CBC Sports under a five-year deal alongside Sportsnet, with CBC airing Saturday coverage, as well as finals coverage of selected events.

== Current Grand Slams ==
=== GSOC Invitational (formerly Tour Challenge) ===
The GSOC Tour Challenge was introduced as a men's and women's event in the 2015–16 curling season. The Tour Challenge has two tiers, with the bottom tier including regional invitations. The Tier 2 winning team qualifies for a subsequent grand slam.

In 2026, it was re-branded as the "GSOC Invitational", with the Tier 2 championship being removed from the GSOC event schedule.

Champions

The winning skip for Tier 1 is listed above the Tier 2 winning skip.

Year	Men's winning skip	Women's winning skip	Location
2015	(Alberta) Kevin Koe	(Switzerland) Silvana Tirinzoni	Paradise, Newfoundland and Labrador
2015	(British Columbia) Jim Cotter	(Manitoba) Kerri Einarson	Paradise, Newfoundland and Labrador
2016	(Sweden) Niklas Edin	(Alberta) Val Sweeting	Cranbrook, British Columbia
2016	(Ontario) Greg Balsdon	(Ontario) Jacqueline Harrison	Cranbrook, British Columbia
2017	(Newfoundland and Labrador) Brad Gushue	(Alberta) Val Sweeting	Regina, Saskatchewan
2017	(Manitoba) Jason Gunnlaugson	(Manitoba) Kerri Einarson	Regina, Saskatchewan
2018	(Ontario) Brad Jacobs	(Ontario) Rachel Homan	Thunder Bay, Ontario
2018	(Saskatchewan) Kirk Muyres	(Switzerland) Elena Stern	Thunder Bay, Ontario
2019	(Ontario) Brad Jacobs	(Sweden) Anna Hasselborg	Westville Road, Nova Scotia
2019	(United States) Korey Dropkin	(South Korea) Kim Min-ji	Westville Road, Nova Scotia
2020	Cancelled		Grande Prairie, Alberta
2021	Cancelled		Grande Prairie, Alberta
2022	(Sweden) Niklas Edin	(Ontario) Tracy Fleury	Grande Prairie, Alberta
2022	(United States) Korey Dropkin	(British Columbia) Clancy Grandy	Grande Prairie, Alberta
2023	(Italy) Joël Retornaz	(Manitoba) Jennifer Jones	Niagara Falls, Ontario
2023	(United States) Daniel Casper	(South Korea) Kim Eun-jung	Niagara Falls, Ontario
2024	(Scotland) Bruce Mouat	(Manitoba) Kerri Einarson	Charlottetown, Prince Edward Island
2024	(Saskatchewan) Rylan Kleiter	(Nova Scotia) Christina Black	Charlottetown, Prince Edward Island
2025^{1}	(Scotland) Bruce Mouat	(Ontario) Rachel Homan	Nisku, Alberta
2025^{1}	(Japan) Takumi Maeda	(Alberta) Serena Gray-Withers	Nisku, Alberta
2026	(Switzerland) Yannick Schwaller	(Manitoba) Kerri Einarson	Victoria, British Columbia

^{1} In 2025, Grand Slam of Curling decided to host both a U25 Jr. GSOC Tour Challenge men's and women's event, instead of a Tier 2 event as in previous seasons, to showcase the future of the sport and support the transition of teams from juniors to men's/women's play.

=== Masters ===
The Masters was introduced as a men's event 2002, and was added to the women's side in 2012.

Champions

The winning skip for Tier 1 is listed above the Tier 2 winning skip.

Year	Men's winning skip	Women's winning skip	Location
2002	(Saskatchewan) Bruce Korte		Gander, Newfoundland and Labrador
2003 (Jan.)	(Alberta) Kevin Martin		Sudbury, Ontario
2003 (Dec.)	(Ontario) Wayne Middaugh		Sudbury, Ontario
2004	(Manitoba) Jeff Stoughton		Humboldt, Saskatchewan
2006 (Feb.)	(Alberta) Randy Ferbey		St. John's, Newfoundland and Labrador
2006 (Dec.)	(Ontario) Glenn Howard		Waterloo, Ontario
2008 (Jan.)	(Ontario) Glenn Howard		Saskatoon, Saskatchewan
2008 (Nov.)	(Ontario) Glenn Howard		Waterloo, Ontario
2009	(Ontario) Glenn Howard		Mississauga, Ontario
2010	(Manitoba) Mike McEwen		Windsor, Ontario
2011	(Ontario) Glenn Howard		Sault Ste. Marie, Ontario
2012	(Alberta) Kevin Koe	(Ontario) Rachel Homan	Brantford, Ontario
2013	(Ontario) Glenn Howard	(Ontario) Rachel Homan	Abbotsford, British Columbia
2014	(Newfoundland and Labrador) Brad Gushue	(Alberta) Val Sweeting	Selkirk, Manitoba
2015	(Manitoba) Mike McEwen	(Ontario) Rachel Homan	Truro, Nova Scotia
2016	(Sweden) Niklas Edin	(Ontario) Allison Flaxey	Okotoks, Alberta
2017	(Newfoundland and Labrador) Brad Gushue	(Manitoba) Jennifer Jones	Lloydminster, Saskatchewan
2018	(Ontario) John Epping	(Sweden) Anna Hasselborg	Truro, Nova Scotia
2019	(Saskatchewan) Matt Dunstone	(Manitoba) Tracy Fleury	North Bay, Ontario
2020	Cancelled		Sarnia, Ontario
2021	(Scotland) Bruce Mouat	(Manitoba) Tracy Fleury	Oakville, Ontario
2022	(Italy) Joël Retornaz	(Manitoba) Kerri Einarson	Oakville, Ontario
2023	(Italy) Joël Retornaz	(Ontario) Rachel Homan	Saskatoon, Saskatchewan
2025 (Jan.)	(Scotland) Ross Whyte	(Sweden) Anna Hasselborg	Guelph, Ontario
2025 (Sept.)	(Manitoba) Matt Dunstone	(Ontario) Rachel Homan	London, Ontario
2025 (Sept.)	(United States) Daniel Casper	(Japan) Ikue Kitazawa	London, Ontario
2026	(Manitoba) Matt Dunstone	(Sweden) Isabella Wranå	Medicine Hat, Alberta

=== National ===
The National was introduced as a men's event in 2002, and was added to the women's side in 2015.

Champions

Year	Men's winning skip	Women's winning skip	Location
2002	(Ontario) Glenn Howard		Sault Ste. Marie, Ontario
2003	(Quebec) Pierre Charette		Humboldt, Saskatchewan
2004 (Jan.)	(Ontario) Glenn Howard		Prince Albert, Saskatchewan
2004 (Nov.)^{1}	(Alberta) Kevin Martin		Hamilton, Ontario
2005	(Ontario) Wayne Middaugh		Port Hawkesbury, Nova Scotia
2007 (Mar.)	(Alberta) Kevin Martin		Port Hawkesbury, Nova Scotia
2007 (Dec.)	(Alberta) Kevin Martin		Port Hawkesbury, Nova Scotia
2008	(Ontario) Wayne Middaugh		Quebec City, Quebec
2010 (Jan.)	(Newfoundland and Labrador) Brad Gushue		Guelph, Ontario
2010 (Dec.)	(Alberta) Kevin Martin		Vernon, British Columbia
2012	(Ontario) Glenn Howard		Dawson Creek, British Columbia
2013	(Manitoba) Jeff Stoughton		Port Hawkesbury, Nova Scotia
2014 (Mar.)	(Ontario) Glenn Howard		Fort McMurray, Alberta
2014 (Nov.)	(Manitoba) Mike McEwen		Sault Ste. Marie, Ontario
2015	(Newfoundland and Labrador) Brad Gushue	(Ontario) Rachel Homan	Oshawa, Ontario
2016	(Ontario) Brad Jacobs	(Manitoba) Kerri Einarson	Sault Ste. Marie, Ontario
2017	(Scotland) Bruce Mouat	(Manitoba) Jennifer Jones	Sault Ste. Marie, Ontario
2018	(Scotland) Ross Paterson	(Ontario) Rachel Homan	Conception Bay South, Newfoundland and Labrador
2019	(Ontario) Brad Jacobs	(Sweden) Anna Hasselborg	Conception Bay South, Newfoundland and Labrador
2020	Cancelled		Chestermere, Alberta
2021	(Newfoundland and Labrador) Brad Gushue	(Sweden) Anna Hasselborg	Chestermere, Alberta
2022	(Newfoundland and Labrador) Brad Gushue	(Switzerland) Silvana Tirinzoni	North Bay, Ontario
2023	(Italy) Joël Retornaz	(South Korea) Gim Eun-ji	Westville Road, Nova Scotia
2024	(Scotland) Bruce Mouat	(Ontario) Rachel Homan	St. John's, Newfoundland and Labrador
2025^{2}	(Scotland) Bruce Mouat	(Ontario) Rachel Homan	Stateline, Nevada
2026	(Alberta) Brad Jacobs	(Switzerland) Alina Pätz	Sydney, Nova Scotia

^{1} There was no National in the 2004–2005 season, but the BDO Curling Classic was held. It returned to its original name in the 2005–2006 season. The words "BDO Classic" were added to the name of the Canadian Open.
^{2} There was no National in the 2025–26 season, instead the event was named the "GSOC Tahoe".

=== GSOC Open (formerly Canadian Open) ===
The Canadian Open was introduced as a men's event in 2001, and was added to the women's side in 2014. The Canadian Open is the only Grand Slam that uses a triple knockout format.

In 2026, it was re-branded as the GSOC Open.

Champions

The winning skip for Tier 1 is listed above the Tier 2 winning skip.

Year	Men's winning skip	Women's winning skip	Location
2001	(Ontario) Wayne Middaugh		Wainwright, Alberta
2002	(Alberta) Kevin Martin		Thunder Bay, Ontario
2003	(Saskatchewan) Glen Despins		Brandon, Manitoba
2005	(Alberta) Kevin Martin		Winnipeg, Manitoba
2006	(Manitoba) Jeff Stoughton		Winnipeg, Manitoba
2007 (Jan.)	(Alberta) Kevin Martin		Winnipeg, Manitoba
2007 (Dec.)	(Alberta) Kevin Martin		Quebec City, Quebec
2009	(Ontario) Glenn Howard		Winnipeg, Manitoba
2010	(Alberta) Kevin Martin		Winnipeg, Manitoba
2011 (Jan.)	(Manitoba) Mike McEwen		Oshawa, Ontario
2011 (Dec.)	(Manitoba) Mike McEwen		Kingston, Ontario
2012	(Ontario) Glenn Howard		Kelowna, British Columbia
2013	(Alberta) Kevin Koe		Medicine Hat, Alberta
2014	(Newfoundland and Labrador) Brad Gushue	(Scotland) Eve Muirhead	Yorkton, Saskatchewan
2015	(Ontario) John Epping	(Ontario) Rachel Homan	Yorkton, Saskatchewan
2017	(Newfoundland and Labrador) Brad Gushue	(Alberta) Casey Scheidegger	North Battleford, Saskatchewan
2018	(Switzerland) Peter de Cruz	(Alberta) Chelsea Carey	Camrose, Alberta
2019	(Alberta) Brendan Bottcher	(Ontario) Rachel Homan	North Battleford, Saskatchewan
2020	(Ontario) Brad Jacobs	(Sweden) Anna Hasselborg	Yorkton, Saskatchewan
2021	Cancelled		Las Vegas, Nevada, United States
2022	Cancelled		Camrose, Alberta
2023	(Alberta) Brendan Bottcher	(Japan) Satsuki Fujisawa	Camrose, Alberta
2024 (Jan.)	(Scotland) Bruce Mouat	(Ontario) Rachel Homan	Red Deer, Alberta
2024 (Nov.)	(Scotland) Bruce Mouat	(Ontario) Rachel Homan	Nisku, Alberta
2025	(Switzerland) Yannick Schwaller	(Switzerland) Silvana Tirinzoni	Saskatoon, Saskatchewan
2025	(Norway) Magnus Ramsfjell	(British Columbia) Taylor Reese-Hansen	Martensville, Saskatchewan
2026			Thunder Bay, Ontario

=== Players' Cup (formerly Players' Championship) ===
The Players' Championship, the oldest tournament on the men's Grand Slam of Curling, was introduced as a men's event in 1993, and added to the women's side in 2006.

In 2026, it was re-branded as the GSOC Players' Cup.

Champions

Year	Men's winning skip	Women's winning skip	Location
1993	(Ontario) Russ Howard		Calgary, Alberta
1994	(Alberta) Kevin Martin		Calgary, Alberta
1995 (Apr.)	(Saskatchewan) Murray McEachern		Selkirk, Manitoba
1995 (Dec.)	(Ontario) Wayne Middaugh		Jasper, Alberta
1997	(Ontario) Russ Howard		Winnipeg, Manitoba
1998	(Alberta) Kevin Martin		Fort McMurray, Alberta
1999	(Ontario) Wayne Middaugh		Winnipeg, Manitoba
2000	(Alberta) Kevin Martin		Winnipeg, Manitoba
2001	(Ontario) Wayne Middaugh		Calgary, Alberta
2002	(Ontario) Wayne Middaugh		Strathroy, Ontario
2003	(Manitoba) Jeff Stoughton		Leduc, Alberta
2004	(Alberta) John Morris		St. John's, Newfoundland and Labrador
2005	(Alberta) Kevin Martin		St. John's, Newfoundland and Labrador
2006	(Alberta) Randy Ferbey	(Manitoba) Jennifer Jones	Calgary, Alberta
2007	(Alberta) Kevin Martin	(Manitoba) Jennifer Jones	Calgary, Alberta
2008	(Ontario) Glenn Howard	(Saskatchewan) Amber Holland	St. John's, Newfoundland and Labrador
2009	(Alberta) Randy Ferbey	(Manitoba) Jennifer Jones	Grande Prairie, Alberta
2010	(Alberta) Kevin Martin	(Alberta) Cheryl Bernard	Dawson Creek, British Columbia
2011	(Alberta) Kevin Martin	(Manitoba) Jennifer Jones	Grande Prairie, Alberta
2012	(Ontario) John Epping	(Saskatchewan) Stefanie Lawton	Summerside, Prince Edward Island
2013	(Ontario) Glenn Howard	(Scotland) Eve Muirhead	Toronto, Ontario
2014	(Alberta) Kevin Martin	(Manitoba) Jennifer Jones	Summerside, Prince Edward Island
2015	(Ontario) Brad Jacobs	(Scotland) Eve Muirhead	Toronto, Ontario
2016	(Newfoundland and Labrador) Brad Gushue	(Scotland) Eve Muirhead	Toronto, Ontario
2017	(Sweden) Niklas Edin	(Manitoba) Jennifer Jones	Toronto, Ontario
2018	(Alberta) Kevin Koe	(United States) Jamie Sinclair	Toronto, Ontario
2019	(Alberta) Brendan Bottcher	(Manitoba) Kerri Einarson	Toronto, Ontario
2020	Cancelled		Toronto, Ontario
2021	(Scotland) Bruce Mouat	(Manitoba) Kerri Einarson	Calgary, Alberta
2022	(Scotland) Bruce Mouat	(Sweden) Anna Hasselborg	Toronto, Ontario
2023	(Alberta) Kevin Koe	(Sweden) Isabella Wranå	Toronto, Ontario
2024	(Newfoundland and Labrador) Brad Gushue	(Switzerland) Silvana Tirinzoni	Toronto, Ontario
2025	(Scotland) Bruce Mouat	(Switzerland) Silvana Tirinzoni	Toronto, Ontario
2026 (Jan.)	(Scotland) Ross Whyte	(Switzerland) Silvana Tirinzoni	Steinbach, Manitoba
2026 (Dec.)			Kingston, Ontario

=== Statistics: Grand Slams won ===
This is a list of Grand Slam events won per player, including Players' Championships won prior to the creation of the Grand Slam.

==== Men ====
Key of colours
Colour	Explanation
	Player currently active on the WCT

As of the 2026 GSOC National; Minimum 2 wins

Player	Invi.	Mast.	Nat.	Open	PC	E10	CC	Total
Kevin Martin	0	1	4	5	8	0	0	18
Marc Kennedy	2	0	4	5	6	0	1	18
Mark Nichols	1	2	5	2	2	2	2	16
Glenn Howard	0	6	4	2	4	0	0	16
Brent Laing	1	7	3	2	3	0	0	16
Ben Hebert	1	0	4	4	5	0	1	15
Brad Gushue	1	2	4	2	2	2	2	15
Wayne Middaugh	0	3	4	2	6	0	0	15
Brett Gallant	1	2	3	3	1	2	3	15
Geoff Walker	1	2	3	2	2	2	2	14
Craig Savill	0	7	2	2	2	0	0	13
Bruce Mouat	2	1	3	2	3	0	1	12
Grant Hardie	2	1	3	2	3	0	1	12
Bobby Lammie	2	1	3	2	3	0	1	12
Hammy McMillan Jr.	2	1	3	2	3	0	1	12
John Morris	0	0	3	3	4	1	0	11
E. J. Harnden	2	1	3	1	2	0	1	10
Ryan Harnden	2	2	2	1	1	0	1	9
Scott Bailey	0	1	2	1	5	0	0	9
Richard Hart	0	4	2	1	1	0	0	8
Carter Rycroft	0	2	1	3	2	0	0	8
Brad Jacobs	2	0	3	1	1	0	1	8
Mike McEwen	0	2	1	2	0	2	0	7
B. J. Neufeld	0	2	1	2	0	2	0	7
Denni Neufeld	0	2	1	2	0	2	0	7
Don Walchuk	0	1	1	2	3	0	0	7
Don Bartlett	0	1	1	2	3	0	0	7
Matt Wozniak	0	2	1	2	0	2	0	7
Kevin Koe	1	1	0	1	3	0	0	6
Graeme McCarrel	0	1	0	1	4	0	0	6
Brendan Bottcher	0	0	0	2	1	0	2	5
Ryan Fry	1	0	2	0	1	0	1	5
Jon Mead	0	1	2	1	1	0	0	5
Ian Tetley	0	0	0	1	4	0	0	5
Niklas Edin	2	1	0	0	1	0	0	4
Oskar Eriksson	2	1	0	0	1	0	0	4
Rasmus Wranå	2	1	0	0	1	0	0	4
Christoffer Sundgren	2	1	0	0	1	0	0	4
Joël Retornaz	1	2	1	0	0	0	0	4
Amos Mosaner	1	2	1	0	0	0	0	4
Sebastiano Arman	1	2	1	0	0	0	0	4
Mattia Giovanella	1	2	1	0	0	0	0	4
Karrick Martin	0	0	0	1	2	0	1	4
John Epping	0	1	1	1	1	0	0	4
Brad Thiessen	0	0	0	1	2	0	1	4
Marcel Rocque	0	1	0	0	3	0	0	4
Jeff Stoughton	0	1	1	1	1	0	0	4
David Nedohin	0	1	0	0	3	0	0	4
Matt Dunstone	0	3	0	0	0	0	0	3
Benoît Schwarz-van Berkel	1	0	0	2	0	0	0	3
Darren Moulding	0	0	0	1	1	0	1	3
Randy Ferbey	0	1	0	0	2	0	0	3
Scott Pfeifer	0	1	0	0	2	0	0	3
Garry Van Den Berghe	0	1	0	1	1	0	0	3
Colton Lott	0	2	0	0	0	0	0	2
Ross Whyte	0	1	0	0	1	0	0	2
Robin Brydone	0	1	0	0	1	0	0	2
Euan Kyle	0	1	0	0	1	0	0	2
Yannick Schwaller	1	0	0	1	0	0	0	2
Sven Michel	1	0	0	1	0	0	0	2
Pablo Lachat-Couchepin	1	0	0	1	0	0	0	2
Reid Carruthers	0	0	1	0	0	0	1	2
Mat Camm	0	1	0	1	0	0	0	2
Braeden Moskowy	0	1	0	0	0	0	1	2
Russ Howard	0	0	0	0	2	0	0	2
Peter Corner	0	0	1	0	1	0	0	2
Collin Mitchell	0	0	2	0	0	0	0	2
Jason Mitchell	0	0	2	0	0	0	0	2
Phil Loevenmark	0	0	1	0	1	0	0	2
Steve Gould	0	1	0	1	0	0	0	2
Nolan Thiessen	0	1	0	1	0	0	0	2
Pat Simmons	0	1	0	1	0	0	0	2

==== Women ====
Key of colours
Colour	Explanation
	Player currently active on the WCT

As of the 2026 GSOC National; Minimum 2 wins

Player	Invi.	Mast.	Nat.	Open	PC	E10*	CC*	AG*	ML&L*	WT*	Sobey's*	CS*	Total
Rachel Homan	3	5	4	4	0	0	4	0	0	0	0	0	20
Emma Miskew	3	5	4	4	0	0	4	0	0	0	0	0	20
Jennifer Jones	1	1	1	0	6	0	1	3	1	1	1	1	17
Dawn McEwen	1	1	1	0	5	0	1	3	1	1	1	1	16
Jill Officer	0	1	1	0	6	0	1	3	1	1	1	1	16
Tracy Fleury	2	4	2	2	0	0	1	0	0	0	0	0	11
Sarah Wilkes	2	2	2	2	0	0	2	0	0	0	0	0	10
Kaitlyn Lawes	0	1	1	0	3	0	1	1	1	0	1	1	10
Lisa Weagle	1	3	2	2	0	0	2	0	0	0	0	0	10
Cathy Overton-Clapham	0	1	0	1	4	0	0	3	0	1	0	0	10
Anna Hasselborg	1	2	2	1	1	1	0	0	0	0	0	0	8
Sara McManus	1	2	2	1	1	1	0	0	0	0	0	0	8
Agnes Knochenhauer	1	2	2	1	1	1	0	0	0	0	0	0	8
Sofia Scharback	1	2	2	1	1	1	0	0	0	0	0	0	8
Val Sweeting	3	2	0	0	2	0	1	0	0	0	0	0	8
Joanne Courtney	1	1	2	2	0	0	2	0	0	0	0	0	8
Kerri Einarson	2	1	1	0	2	0	1	0	0	0	0	0	7
Silvana Tirinzoni	1	0	1	1	3	0	1	0	0	0	0	0	7
Alina Pätz	0	0	2	1	3	0	1	0	0	0	0	0	7
Eve Muirhead	0	0	0	1	3	0	0	1	0	0	0	1	6
Vicki Chalmers	0	0	0	1	3	0	0	1	0	0	0	1	6
Shannon Birchard	1	1	0	0	2	0	1	0	0	0	0	0	5
Carole Howald	0	0	1	1	3	0	0	0	0	0	0	0	5
Anna Sloan	0	0	0	1	2	0	0	1	0	0	0	1	5
Selina Witschonke	0	0	1	1	3	0	0	0	0	0	0	0	5
Rachelle Brown	2	1	0	0	0	0	1	0	0	0	0	0	4
Briane Harris	0	1	0	0	2	0	1	0	0	0	0	0	4
Sherry Anderson	0	0	0	0	1	0	0	0	2	0	0	1	4
Sarah Reid	0	0	0	1	2	0	0	0	0	0	0	1	4
Stefanie Lawton	0	0	0	0	1	0	0	0	1	1	0	1	4
Sherri Singler	0	0	0	0	1	0	0	0	1	1	0	1	4
Marliese Kasner	0	0	0	0	1	0	0	0	1	1	0	1	4
Selena Njegovan	0	2	1	0	0	0	0	0	0	0	0	0	3
Kristin Gordon	0	2	1	0	0	0	0	0	0	0	0	0	3
Liz Fyfe	0	2	1	0	0	0	0	0	0	0	0	0	3
Dana Ferguson	2	1	0	0	0	0	0	0	0	0	0	0	3
Jeanna Schraeder	0	0	0	0	0	0	0	1	1	1	0	0	3
Sasha Carter	0	0	0	0	0	0	0	1	1	1	0	0	3
Kelly Scott	0	0	0	0	0	0	0	1	1	1	0	0	3
Chelsey Matson	0	0	0	0	0	0	0	1	1	1	0	0	3
Isabella Wranå	0	1	0	0	1	0	0	0	0	0	0	0	2
Almida de Val	0	1	0	0	1	0	0	0	0	0	0	0	2
Karlee Burgess	2	0	0	0	0	0	0	0	0	0	0	0	2
Jocelyn Peterman	1	0	0	1	0	0	0	0	0	0	0	0	2
Maria Larsson	0	1	0	0	1	0	0	0	0	0	0	0	2
Sherry Middaugh	0	0	0	0	0	0	0	1	0	0	1	0	2
Chelsea Carey	0	0	0	1	0	0	0	0	1	0	0	0	2
Esther Neuenschwander	1	0	0	0	0	0	1	0	0	0	0	0	2
Renee Simons	0	0	0	0	0	0	0	1	0	1	0	0	2
Lori Olson-Johns	2	0	0	0	0	0	0	0	0	0	0	0	2
Alison Kreviazuk	0	2	0	0	0	0	0	0	0	0	0	0	2
Claire Hamilton	0	0	0	0	1	0	0	1	0	0	0	0	2
Shannon Kleibrink	0	0	0	0	0	0	0	1	1	0	0	0	2
Amy Nixon	0	0	0	0	0	0	0	1	1	0	0	0	2
Bronwen Webster	0	0	0	0	0	0	0	1	1	0	0	0	2

Note: Totals do not include wins prior to the first Grand Slam season of 2006–07, excepting the Players'.

== Former Grand Slams ==
=== Sobeys Slam ===
The Sobeys Slam was held as a Grand Slam event on three occasions in New Glasgow, Nova Scotia.

Champions

Year	Winning skip
2007	Sherry Middaugh
2008	Marie-France Larouche
2009	Not held
2010	Jennifer Jones

=== Wayden Transportation Ladies Classic ===
The Wayden Transportation Ladies Classic was held annually in Abbotsford, British Columbia, and was held nine times before it was discontinued.

Champions

Year	Winning skip
2000	Shannon Kleibrink
2001	Shannon Kleibrink
2002	Kelly Scott
2003	Kelly Scott
2004	Kelley Law
2005	Janet Harvey
2006	Stefanie Lawton
2007	Kelly Scott
2008	Jennifer Jones

=== Manitoba Lotteries Women's Curling Classic ===
The Manitoba Women's Curling Classic was held in Portage la Prairie, Manitoba, and was held eight times as a Grand Slam tournament. It was removed from the Grand Slam lineup starting in the 2014–15 curling season.

Champions

Year	Winning skip	Runner-up skip
2004	Cheryl Bernard	Shannon Kleibrink
2005	Jennifer Jones	Shannon Kleibrink
2006	Sherry Anderson	Jennifer Jones
2007	Shannon Kleibrink	Jennifer Jones
2008	Michelle Englot	Kelly Scott
2009	Kelly Scott	Jennifer Jones
2010	Chelsea Carey	Cathy Overton-Clapham
2011	Renée Sonnenberg	Heather Nedohin
2012	Stefanie Lawton	Rachel Homan
2013	Jennifer Jones	Jill Thurston

=== Curlers' Corner Autumn Gold Curling Classic ===
The Autumn Gold Curling Classic is held annually in Calgary, Alberta, and has been held 42 times (as of 2019). It offers a total purse of $50,000. It was removed from the Grand Slam lineup starting in the 2015–16 curling season.

Year	Winning skip	Runner-up skip
1978	Dorenda Schoenhalds	Marj Mitchell
1979	Crystal Brunas	Susan Seitz
1980	Kerrylyn Richard	Joan Hart
1981	Kathy Fahlman	Linda Saunders
1982	Ruby Sowinski	Kathy Fahlman
1983	Emily Farnham	Judy Lukowich
1984	Sandy Tuner	Marilyn Cheyne
1985	Marilyn Bodogh-Darte	Sandy Turner
1986	Marilyn Bodogh-Darte	Kathy Fahlman
1987	Jan Wiltzen	Sandra Risebrough
1988	Michelle Schneider	Carol Davis
1989	Kerrylyn Richard	Sandy Turner
1990	Cheryl Bernard	Linda Wild
1991	Sandra Peterson	Diane Foster
1992	Michelle Schneider	Deb Santos
1993	Sherry Scheirich	Glenys Bakker
1994	Michelle Schneider	Elisabet Johansson
1995	Elisabet Gustafson	Glenys Bakker
1996	Shannon Kleibrink	Kelley Owen
1997	Heather Rankin	Cheryl Kullman
1998	Kim Gellard	Amber Holland
1999	Cathy Borst	Bronwen Saunders
2000	Amber Holland	Shannon Kleibrink
2001	Cathy King	Cheryl Bernard
2002	Heather Nedohin	Cheryl Bernard
2003	Sherry Anderson	Cathy King
2004	Stefanie Lawton	Cheryl Bernard
2005	Jenn Hanna	Jan Betker
2006	Kelly Scott	Crystal Webster
2007	Jennifer Jones	Shannon Kleibrink
2008	Shannon Kleibrink	Cheryl Bernard
2009	Jennifer Jones	Wang Bingyu
2010	Wang Bingyu	Desirée Owen
2011	Cathy Overton-Clapham	Amy Nixon
2012	Sherry Middaugh	Rachel Homan
2013	Eve Muirhead	Wang Bingyu
2014	Jennifer Jones	Rachel Homan

=== Colonial Square Ladies Classic ===
The Colonial Square Ladies Classic is held annually in Saskatoon, Saskatchewan, and has been held since 1983. It officially became a Grand Slam event in 2012. It was removed from the Grand Slam lineup starting in the 2015–16 curling season.

Year	Winning skip	Runner-up skip
1983	Chris More	Marilyn Bodogh
1984 (Mar)	Carol Davis	Nancy Kerr
1984 (Nov)	Carolyn Mrack	Connie Laliberte
1985	Marilyn Darte	Cordella Schwengler
1986	Lori McGeary	Merle Kopach
1987	Karen Powell	Heather MacMillan
1988	Marilyn Bodogh-Darte	Andrea Schöpp
1989	Kim Armbruster	Carolyn Revet
1990	Penny Ryan	Deb Shermack
1991	Michelle Schneider	Connie Fennell
1992	Shannon Kleibrink	Karen Fallis
1993	Sandra Peterson	Karen Powell
1994	Sandra Peterson	Sherry Anderson
1995	Sherry Anderson	Michelle Schneider
1996	Kelley Owen	Sherry Scheirich
1997	Sherry Scheirich	Kim Hodson
1998	Renelle Bryden	Amber Holland
1999	Michelle Ridgway	Atina Ford
2000	Sherry Anderson	Heather Fowlie
2001	Sherry Anderson	Susan Altman
2002	Sherry Anderson	Nancy Inglis
2003	Cathy Trowell	Nancy Inglis
2004	Sherry Middaugh	Renée Sonnenberg
2005	Stefanie Lawton	Candace Chisholm
2006	Jennifer Jones	Karen Purdy
2007	Stefanie Lawton	Cathy King
2008	Stefanie Lawton	Michelle Englot
2009	Stefanie Lawton	Mirjam Ott
2010	Stefanie Lawton	Jennifer Jones
2011	Crystal Webster	Val Sweeting
2012	Stefanie Lawton	Chelsea Carey
2013	Jennifer Jones	Michèle Jäggi
2014	Eve Muirhead	Sherry Middaugh

=== Elite 10 ===
The Elite 10 was introduced as a men's event in 2015, and added to the women's side in September 2018. The Elite 10 used a unique match play format, similar to skins curling. The event was dropped for the 2019–20 curling season.

Champions

Year	Men's winning skip	Women's winning skip	Location
2015	(Manitoba) Mike McEwen		Fort McMurray, Alberta
2016	(Newfoundland and Labrador) Brad Gushue		Colwood, British Columbia
2017	(British Columbia) John Morris		Port Hawkesbury, Nova Scotia
2018 (Mar.)	(Manitoba) Mike McEwen		Winnipeg, Manitoba
2018 (Sep.)	(Newfoundland and Labrador) Brad Gushue	(Sweden) Anna Hasselborg	Chatham, Ontario

=== Champions Cup ===
The Champions Cup was introduced as a men's and women's event in the 2015–16 curling season. The Champions Cup is contested by champions of various Grand Slam, Season of Champions, World Curling Tour, and other events throughout the season. The event will not be held in 2024, as it has been put on hold.

Champions

Year	Men's winning skip	Women's winning skip	Location
2016	(Manitoba) Reid Carruthers	(Manitoba) Jennifer Jones	Sherwood Park, Alberta
2017	(Ontario) Brad Jacobs	(Ontario) Rachel Homan	Calgary, Alberta
2018	(Newfoundland and Labrador) Brad Gushue	(Ontario) Rachel Homan	Calgary, Alberta
2019	(Alberta) Brendan Bottcher	(Switzerland) Silvana Tirinzoni	Saskatoon, Saskatchewan
2020	Cancelled		Olds, Alberta
2021	(Scotland) Bruce Mouat	(Ontario) Rachel Homan	Calgary, Alberta
2022	(Newfoundland and Labrador) Brad Gushue	(Manitoba) Kerri Einarson	Olds, Alberta
2023	(Alberta) Brendan Bottcher	(Ontario) Rachel Homan	Regina, Saskatchewan

== Grand Slam season champions ==
From the 2008–09 season to the 2022–23 season, the top Grand Slam team each season was awarded a cup as champions of the season. It was originally called the "Capital One Cup", with the winning team awarded $50,000. It became the "Rogers Grand Slam Cup" in 2012 with the winning team given $75,000, then it became the "Bonus Cup" for the 2017–18 season, and then the "Pinty's Cup" in 2018–19, and had that name until 2022. Teams accumulate points based on their performance in each of the slams except for the Champions Cup and Tour Challenge Tier 2. Prior to 2012, the women's champions also factored in the results from the Tour Slams that were not owned by the Grand Slam of Curling.

Season	Men's winning skip	Women's winning skip
2008–09	(Ontario) Glenn Howard	(Manitoba) Jennifer Jones
2009–10	(Alberta) Kevin Martin	(Alberta) Cheryl Bernard
2010–11	(Alberta) Kevin Martin	(Manitoba) Jennifer Jones
2011–12	(Ontario) Glenn Howard	(Manitoba) Cathy Overton-Clapham
2012–13	(Ontario) Glenn Howard	(Scotland) Eve Muirhead
2013–14	(Alberta) Kevin Martin	(Manitoba) Jennifer Jones
2014–15	(Ontario) Brad Jacobs	(Scotland) Eve Muirhead
2015–16	(Newfoundland and Labrador) Brad Gushue	(Ontario) Rachel Homan
2016–17	(Sweden) Niklas Edin	(Alberta) Val Sweeting
2017–18	(Newfoundland and Labrador) Brad Gushue	(Manitoba) Jennifer Jones
2018–19	(Alberta) Kevin Koe	(Ontario) Rachel Homan
2019–20	(Ontario) Brad Jacobs	(Sweden) Anna Hasselborg
2021–22	(Scotland) Bruce Mouat	(Sweden) Anna Hasselborg
2022–23	(Newfoundland and Labrador) Brad Gushue	(Manitoba) Kerri Einarson
