= 2019–20 curling season =

- Sport: Curling

Seasons
- ← 2018–19 2020–21 →

The 2019–20 curling season began in June 2019 and was scheduled to end in May 2020. However, the coronavirus pandemic declared in March 2020 resulted in the cancellation of events and the premature ending of the season.

Note: In events with two genders, the men's tournament winners will be listed before the women's tournament winners.

== World Curling Federation events ==
=== Championships ===
Event		Gold	Silver	Bronze
World Mixed Curling Championship; Aberdeen, Scotland, Oct. 12–19		Canada (Kurz)	Germany (Kapp)	Norway (Skaga)
Pacific-Asia Curling Championships; Shenzhen, China, Nov. 2–9		South Korea (Kim)	Japan (Matsumura)	China (Zou)
Pacific-Asia Curling Championships; Shenzhen, China, Nov. 2–9		China (Han)	Japan (Nakajima)	South Korea (Gim)
European Curling Championships; Helsingborg, Sweden, Nov. 15–23	A	Sweden (Edin)	Switzerland (Schwaller)	Scotland (Paterson)
European Curling Championships; Helsingborg, Sweden, Nov. 15–23	A	Sweden (Hasselborg)	Scotland (Muirhead)	Switzerland (Tirinzoni)
European Curling Championships; Helsingborg, Sweden, Nov. 15–23	B	Czech Republic (Klíma)	Finland (Pöllänen)	Poland (Jasiecki)
European Curling Championships; Helsingborg, Sweden, Nov. 15–23	B	Italy (Zappone)	Turkey (Yıldız)	Hungary (Palancsa)
World Wheelchair-B Curling Championship; Lohja, Finland, Nov. 27 – Dec. 2		Canada (Ideson)	Sweden (Petersson-Dahl)	Czech Republic (Selnekovičová)
World Junior-B Curling Championships; Lohja, Finland, Dec. 10–18		Sweden (Magnusson)	Italy (Colli)	Germany (Totzek)
World Junior-B Curling Championships; Lohja, Finland, Dec. 10–18		Japan (Yamamoto)	Latvia (Barone)	Denmark (Halse)
Youth Olympic Games; Lausanne, Switzerland, Jan. 10–22	MT	Norway (Høstmælingen)	Japan (Maeda)	Russia (Denisenko)
Youth Olympic Games; Lausanne, Switzerland, Jan. 10–22	MD	Nagy (HUN) / Young (CAN)	Beitone (FRA) / Lysakov (RUS)	Pei (CHN) / Chabičovský (CZE)
World Junior Curling Championships; Krasnoyarsk, Russia, Feb. 15–22		Canada (Gauthier)	Switzerland (Hösli)	Scotland (Craik)
World Junior Curling Championships; Krasnoyarsk, Russia, Feb. 15–22		Canada (Zacharias)	South Korea (Kim)	Russia (Rumiantseva)
World Wheelchair Curling Championship; Wetzikon, Switzerland, Feb. 29 – Mar. 7		Russia (Kurokhtin)	Canada (Ideson)	Sweden (Petersson-Dahl)
World Women's Curling Championship; Prince George, Canada, Mar. 14–22		Cancelled		
World Men's Curling Championship; Glasgow, Scotland, Mar. 28 – Apr. 5		Cancelled		
World Mixed Doubles Curling Championship; Kelowna, Canada, Apr. 18–25		Cancelled		
World Senior Curling Championships; Kelowna, Canada, Apr. 18–25		Cancelled		
European Curling Championships; Ljubljana, Slovenia, Apr. 28 – May 5		Cancelled		

=== Qualification events ===
Event	Qualifiers
Americas Challenge; Eveleth, Minnesota, Nov. 28–30	United States
Americas Challenge; Eveleth, Minnesota, Nov. 28–30	United States
World Mixed Doubles Qualification Event; Howwood, Scotland, Dec. 2–7	China; Germany; Italy; South Korea
World Qualification Event; Lohja, Finland, Jan. 13–18	China; Russia
World Qualification Event; Lohja, Finland, Jan. 13–18	Italy; South Korea

== Curling Canada events ==
=== Championships ===
Event	Gold	Silver	Bronze
Canadian Mixed Curling Championship; Saguenay, Quebec, Nov. 3–9	Quebec (Roy)	New Brunswick (Odishaw)	Northwest Territories (Koe)
Canadian Curling Club Championships; Leduc, Alberta, Nov. 25–30	Ontario (Moffatt)	Quebec (Gibeau)	Northern Ontario (Mikkelsen)
Canadian Curling Club Championships; Leduc, Alberta, Nov. 25–30	Alberta (Dupont)	Nova Scotia (Phillips)	Quebec (Néron)
Canadian Junior Curling Championships; Langley, British Columbia, Jan. 18–26	Manitoba 2 (Gauthier)	Newfoundland and Labrador (Bruce)	Saskatchewan (Kleiter)
Canadian Junior Curling Championships; Langley, British Columbia, Jan. 18–26	Manitoba (Zacharias)	Alberta (Marks)	Nova Scotia (Stevens)
Scotties Tournament of Hearts; Moose Jaw, Saskatchewan, Feb. 15–23	Manitoba (Einarson)	Ontario (Homan)	(Manitoba) Wild Card (Jones)
Tim Hortons Brier; Kingston, Ontario, Feb. 28 – Mar. 8	Newfoundland and Labrador (Gushue)	Alberta (Bottcher)	Saskatchewan (Dunstone)
CCAA/Curling Canada College Curling Championships; Portage la Prairie, Manitoba, Mar. 11–15	(Alberta) Concordia Thunder (van Amsterdam)	(Ontario) Humber Hawks (Shurtleff)	(Ontario) Fanshawe Falcons (Richard)
CCAA/Curling Canada College Curling Championships; Portage la Prairie, Manitoba, Mar. 11–15	(British Columbia) Douglas Royals (MacMillan)	(Ontario) Humber Hawks (Jones)	(Alberta) Red Deer Queens (Vincent)
U Sports/Curling Canada University Curling Championships; Portage la Prairie, Manitoba, Mar. 11–15	(Ontario) Wilfrid Laurier Golden Hawks (Hall)	(Nova Scotia) Dalhousie Tigers (Manuel)	Alberta Golden Bears (Sturmay)
U Sports/Curling Canada University Curling Championships; Portage la Prairie, Manitoba, Mar. 11–15	Alberta Pandas (Sturmay)	(New Brunswick) UNB Reds (Comeau)	(Ontario) Queen's Golden Gaels (Fay)
Canadian Senior Curling Championships; Portage la Prairie, Manitoba, Mar. 16–22	Postponed indefinitely		
Canadian Mixed Doubles Curling Championship; Portage la Prairie, Manitoba, Mar. 17–22	Postponed indefinitely		
Canadian Under-18 Boys and Girls Curling Championships; Sudbury, Ontario, Apr. 21–26	Postponed indefinitely		
Canadian Wheelchair Curling Championship; Boucherville, Quebec, Apr. 25–30	Postponed indefinitely		

=== Other events ===
Event	Winner	Runner-up
Canada Cup; Leduc, Alberta, Nov. 27 – Dec. 1	(Ontario) John Epping	(Alberta) Kevin Koe
Canada Cup; Leduc, Alberta, Nov. 27 – Dec. 1	(Ontario) Rachel Homan	(Manitoba) Tracy Fleury
Continental Cup; London, Ontario, Jan. 9–12	Team Europe	Team Canada

=== Provincial and territorial playdowns ===
Province/ territory	Men			Women		
Province/ territory	Event	Champion	Runner-up	Event	Champion	Runner-up
Alberta; Okotoks, Jan. 22 – 26 (Women's); Westlock, Feb. 5 – 9 (Men's)	Boston Pizza Cup	Brendan Bottcher	Karsten Sturmay	Alberta Scotties	Laura Walker	Kelsey Rocque
British Columbia; Cranbrook, Jan. 28 – Feb. 2	BC Men's Championship	Jim Cotter	Tyler Tardi	British Columbia Scotties	Corryn Brown	Sarah Wark
Manitoba; Rivers, Jan. 29 – Feb. 2 (Women's); Winnipeg, Feb. 5 – 9 (Men's)	Viterra Championship	Jason Gunnlaugson	Mike McEwen	Manitoba Scotties	Kerri Einarson	Jennifer Jones
New Brunswick; Rothesay, Jan. 23 – 26 (Women's); Fredericton, Jan. 29 – Feb. 2 (Men's)	New Brunswick Tankard	James Grattan	Jason Roach	New Brunswick Scotties	Andrea Crawford	Sylvie Quillian
Newfoundland and Labrador; St. John's, Jan. 11 – 15 (Women's); Jan. 28 – Feb. 2 (Men's)	Newfoundland and Labrador Tankard	Brad Gushue	Trent Skanes	Newfoundland and Labrador Scotties	Erica Curtis	Mackenzie Mitchell
Northern Ontario; New Liskeard, Jan. 29 – Feb. 2	Northern Ontario Men's; Provincial Championship	Brad Jacobs	Mike Badiuk	Northern Ontario Scotties	Krista McCarville	Krysta Burns
Northwest Territories; Hay River, Jan. 9 – 12 (Women's); Jan. 30 – Feb. 3 (Men's)	Northwest Territories; Men's Championship	Jamie Koe	Glen Hudy	Northwest; Territories Scotties	Kerry Galusha	Sarah Stroeder
Nova Scotia; Dartmouth, Jan. 20 – 26	Deloitte Tankard	Jamie Murphy	Kendal Thompson	Nova Scotia Scotties	Mary-Anne Arsenault	Colleen Jones
Nunavut; Iqaluit, Dec. 6 – 8 (Men's)	Brier Playdowns	Jake Higgs	Dave St. Louis; Wade Kingdon	–	Lori Eddy	–
Ontario; Cornwall, Jan. 27 – Feb. 2	Ontario Tankard	John Epping	Glenn Howard	Ontario Scotties	Rachel Homan	Hollie Duncan
Prince Edward Island; Montague, Jan. 8 – 12	Prince Edward; Island Tankard	Bryan Cochrane	Philip Gorveatt; Eddie MacKenzie	Prince Edward; Island Scotties	Suzanne Birt	Veronica Smith
Quebec; Salaberry-de-Valleyfield, Jan. 19 – 26	Quebec Tankard	Alek Bédard	Vincent Roberge	Quebec Scotties	Noémie Verreault	Laurie St-Georges
Saskatchewan; Melville, Jan. 24 – 28 (Women's); Jan. 29 – Feb. 2 (Men's)	SaskTel Tankard	Matt Dunstone	Kirk Muyres	Saskatchewan Scotties	Robyn Silvernagle	Sherry Anderson
Yukon; Whitehorse, Jan. 24 – 26	Yukon Men's Championship	Thomas Scoffin	Pat Paslawski	–	Hailey Birnie	–

== National championships ==
=== Denmark ===
Event	Gold	Silver	Bronze
Danish Men's Curling Championship; Hvidovre, Feb. 29–Mar. 1	Tobias Thune	Rasmus Stjerne	Ulrik Schmidt
Danish Women's Curling Championship; Hvidovre, Feb. 28–Mar. 1	Mathilde Halse	Madeleine Dupont	Helle Eeg Hansen

=== Japan ===
Event	Gold	Silver	Bronze
Japan Men's Curling Championship; Karuizawa, Nagano, Feb. 8–16	(Hokkaido) Yuta Matsumura	(Nagano Prefecture) Yusuke Morozumi	(Nagano Prefecture) Tsuyoshi Yamaguchi
Japan Women's Curling Championship; Karuizawa, Nagano, Feb. 8–16	(Hokkaido) Satsuki Fujisawa	(Nagano Prefecture) Seina Nakajima	(Hokkaido) Sayaka Yoshimura
Japan Mixed Doubles Curling Championship; Sapporo, Hokkaido, Feb. 25–Mar. 1	(Nagano Prefecture) Chiaki Matsumura / (Hokkaido) Yasumasa Tanida	(Hokkaido) Satsuki Fujisawa / (Nagano Prefecture) Tsuyoshi Yamaguchi	(Hokkaido) Chinami Yoshida / Tetsuro Shimizu

=== Russia ===
Event	Gold	Silver	Bronze
Russian Mixed Doubles Curling Championship; Krasnoyarsk, Feb. 24–Mar. 1	(Moscow Oblast) Anastasia Moskaleva / Alexander Eremin	(Saint Petersburg) Alina Kovaleva / Alexey Timofeev	(Moscow Oblast) Daria Styoksova / Mikhail Vaskov

=== Scotland ===
Event	Gold	Silver	Bronze
Scottish Men's Curling Championship; Perth, Feb. 10–15	Bruce Mouat	Glen Muirhead	Ross Paterson
Scottish Women's Curling Championship; Perth, Feb. 10–15	Eve Muirhead	Maggie Wilson	Beth Farmer
Scottish Mixed Doubles Curling Championship; Perth, Feb. 27–Mar. 1	Jennifer Dodds / Bruce Mouat	Gina Aitken / Scott Andrews	Eve Muirhead / Bobby Lammie

=== South Korea ===
Event	Gold	Silver	Bronze
Korean Men's Curling Championship; Gangneung, Jul. 6–11	Kim Chang-min	Kim Soo-hyuk	Jeong Yeong-seok
Korean Women's Curling Championship; Gangneung, Jul. 6–11	Gim Un-chi	Kim Min-ji	Kim Kyeong-ae
Korean Mixed Doubles Curling Championship; Gangneung, Jul. 1–5	H. J. Jang / Seong	H. R. Jang / Choi	Lee / Kim

=== Sweden ===
Event	Gold	Silver	Bronze
Swedish Men's Curling Championship; Jönköping, Feb. 6–10	Niklas Edin	Daniel Magnusson	Alexander Lindström; Andreas Andersteg
Swedish Women's Curling Championship; Jönköping, Feb. 6–10	Anna Hasselborg	Tova Sundberg	Isabella Wranå
Swedish Mixed Doubles Curling Championship; Sundbyberg, Feb. 27–Mar. 1	Agnes Knochenhauer / Rasmus Wranå	Johanna Heldin / Kristian Lindström	Monika Wranå / Mats Wranå

=== Switzerland ===
Event	Gold	Silver	Bronze
Swiss Men's Curling Championship; Thun, Feb. 8–16	(Canton of Bern) Yannick Schwaller	(Canton of Geneva) Peter de Cruz	(Vaud) Jan Klossner
Swiss Women's Curling Championship; Thun, Feb. 9–15	(Valais) Elena Stern	(Aargau) Silvana Tirinzoni	(Canton of Bern) Binia Feltscher
Swiss Mixed Doubles Curling Championship; Aarau, Feb. 26–Mar. 1	(Canton of Glarus) Jenny Perret / Martin Rios	(Canton of Geneva) Melanie Barbezat / Peter de Cruz	(Aargau) Alina Pätz / Sven Michel

=== United States ===
Event	Gold	Silver	Bronze
United States Men's Curling Championship; Cheney, Washington, Feb. 8–15	(Minnesota) John Shuster	(Minnesota) Rich Ruohonen	(Massachusetts) Chase Sinnett
United States Women's Curling Championship; Cheney, Washington, Feb. 8–15	(Minnesota) Tabitha Peterson	(North Carolina) Jamie Sinclair	(Alaska) Ariel Traxler
United States Mixed Doubles Curling Championship; Bemidji, Minnesota, Feb. 27–Mar. 1	(Minnesota) Tabitha Peterson / Joe Polo	(Minnesota) Cory Christensen / John Shuster	(Minnesota) Sarah Anderson / Korey Dropkin

== World Curling Tour ==
=== Teams ===
See: List of teams on the 2019–20 World Curling Tour

Grand Slam events in bold. Note: More events may be posted as time progresses.

=== Men's events ===
Week	Event	Winning skip	Runner-up skip	Purse (CAD)	Winner's share (CAD)	SFM
1	Morioka City Mens Memorial Cup; Morioka, Japan, Jun. 15–16	(Japan) Ryo Ogihara	(Japan) Tsuyoshi Yamaguchi	¥ 195,000	¥ 80,000	1.8474
2	Hokkaido Bank Curling Classic; Sapporo, Japan, Aug. 1–4	(Japan) Yuta Matsumura	(Ontario) Scott McDonald	¥ 1,700,000	¥ 1,000,000	5.3138
3	ADVICS Cup; Kitami, Japan, Aug. 9–12	(Japan) Yusuke Morozumi	(South Korea) Park Jong-duk	¥ 1,700,000	¥ 1,000,000	4.2413
5	Baden Masters; Baden, Switzerland, Aug. 23–25	(Switzerland) Yannick Schwaller	(Sweden) Niklas Edin	CHF 33,000	CHF 11,000	6.8850
5	Cargill Curling Training Centre Icebreaker; Morris, Manitoba, Aug. 23–25	(Manitoba) Jason Gunnlaugson	(Manitoba) Ty Dilello	$7,840	$2,230	3.8067
6	Cameron's Brewing Oakville Fall Classic; Oakville, Ontario, Aug. 30–Sept. 2	(Switzerland) Yannick Schwaller	(South Korea) Kim Chang-min	$16,000	$3,500	6.4893
7	Stu Sells Oakville Tankard; Oakville, Ontario, Sept. 5–8	(Ontario) John Epping	(Saskatchewan) Matt Dunstone	$36,000	$8,000	9.6457
8	AMJ Campbell Shorty Jenkins Classic; Cornwall, Ontario, Sept. 10–15	(Ontario) John Epping	(Ontario) Brad Jacobs	$59,000	$15,000	11.5625
8	Goldline US Open of Curling - Contender Round; Blaine, Minnesota, Sept. 13–15	(United States) Scott Dunnam	(Ontario) Jordan Chandler	$14,830	$4,105	2.4611
8	King Cash Spiel; Maple Ridge, British Columbia, Sept. 13–15	(British Columbia) Sean Geall	(British Columbia) Jim Cotter	$11,500	$4,500	2.6409
9	Beyer & Simonson US Open of Curling - Championships; Blaine, Minnesota, Sept. 19–22	(United States) Rich Ruohonen	(United States) Korey Dropkin	$11,400 (US)	$5,320 (US)	3.3160
9	KW Fall Classic; Waterloo, Ontario, Sept. 19–22	(Japan) Yusuke Morozumi	(Ontario) Wayne Tuck Jr.	$8,400	$2,000	3.5920
9	Mother Club Fall Curling Classic; Winnipeg, Manitoba, Sept. 19–22	(Manitoba) Jason Gunnlaugson	(Manitoba) Tanner Horgan	$10,000	$2,500	4.4685
9	Cabot Spiel; St. John's, Newfoundland and Labrador, Sept. 21–22	(Newfoundland and Labrador) Colin Thomas	(Newfoundland and Labrador) Jeff Thomas	$4,000	$2,400	1.5998
9	The Good Times Bonspiel; Calgary Alberta, Sept. 20–22	(Alberta) Daylan Vavrek	(Alberta) Cole Adams	$3,600	$1,000	2.1977
9	Obihiro Ice Gold Cup; Obihiro, Japan, Sept. 20–22	(Japan) Shingo Usui	(Japan) Kantaro Kawano	¥ 950,000	¥ 500,000	1.6019
10	Moosehead Fall Open; Ottawa, Ontario, Sept. 26–29	(Japan) Tsuyoshi Yamaguchi	(Quebec) Michael Fournier	$11,600	$2,400	2.9292
10	The Curling Store Cashspiel; Lower Sackville, Nova Scotia, Sept. 27–29	(Nova Scotia) Stuart Thompson	(Nova Scotia) Kendal Thompson	$5,250	$3,600	2.6437
10	Tallinn Men's International Challenger; Tallinn, Estonia, Sept. 27–29	(Finland) Jermu Pöllänen	(Latvia) Martins Truksans	€ 3,000	€ 1,200	1.8683
11	WCT Uiseong International Curling Cup; Uiseong, South Korea, Sept. 30–Oct. 3	(Manitoba) Mike McEwen	(United States) John Shuster	₩ 55,000,000	₩ 25,000,000	6.3863
11	Swiss Cup Basel; Basel, Switzerland, Oct. 3–6	(Switzerland) Peter de Cruz	(Scotland) Ross Paterson	CHF 38,000	CHF 12,000	6.5337
11	Stu Sells Toronto Tankard; Toronto, Ontario, Oct. 3–7	(Ontario) Brad Jacobs	(Alberta) Kevin Koe	$38,000	$12,000	7.8155
11	Prestige Hotels & Resorts Curling Classic; Vernon, British Columbia, Oct. 3–6	(British Columbia) Tyler Tardi	(British Columbia) Jim Cotter	$18,000	$4,000	3.0952
11	Avonair Cash Spiel; Edmonton, Alberta, Oct. 3–6	(Alberta) Jeremy Harty	(Alberta) Ryan Jacques	$12,000	$3,400	3.3187
11	Let's Cure Lupus St. Paul Cash Spiel; St. Paul, Minnesota, Oct. 4–6	(United States) Rich Ruohonen	(United States) Todd Birr	$12,000 (US)	$4,000 (US)	2.4695
11	Manitoba Curling Tour Classic; Winnipeg, Manitoba, Oct. 3–6	(Manitoba) Tanner Horgan	(Manitoba) Corey Chambers	$9,000	$2,000	3.2315
11	Saskatoon Nutana Cash; Saskatoon, Saskatchewan, Oct. 4–6	(Saskatchewan) Shaun Meachem	(Saskatchewan) Brent Gedak	$9,500	$3,000	2.6250
12	Driving Force Decks Int'l Abbotsford Cashspiel; Abbotsford, British Columbia, Oct. 11–14	(Japan) Yuta Matsumura	(British Columbia) Jason Montgomery	$22,800	$6,000	2.8344
12	La Classique Ville de Lévis; Lévis, Quebec, Oct. 11–14	(Quebec) Vincent Roberge	(Quebec) Martin Crête	$8,000	$2,200	2.2896
12	McKee Homes Fall Curling Classic; Airdrie, Alberta, Oct. 12–14	(Alberta) Jeremy Harty	(Russia) Sergei Glukhov	$12,800	$3,400	2.6415
12	Bud Light Men's Cash Spiel; Halifax, Nova Scotia, Oct. 11–14	(Nova Scotia) Chad Stevens	(Nova Scotia) Brent MacDougall	$6,400	$1,750	2.0851
12	Kalamazoo Men's Classic; Kalamazoo, Michigan, Oct. 11–13	(Ontario) Dale Kelly	(Ontario) Rick Law	$3,300 (US)	$1,500 (US)	1.3279
12	Moosehead Classic Open; Ottawa, Ontario, Oct. 12–14	(Ontario) Jason Camm	(Quebec) Greg Balsdon	$5,500	$1,600	2.0125
13	Curling Masters Champéry; Champéry, Switzerland, Oct. 17–20	(Netherlands) Jaap van Dorp	(Norway) Thomas Ulsrud	CHF 35,000	CHF 10,000	6.2775
13	Medicine Hat Charity Classic; Medicine Hat, Alberta, Oct. 18–21	(Alberta) Karsten Sturmay	(Manitoba) Jason Gunnlaugson	$35,000	$10,000	6.1975
13	Steele Cup Cash; Fredericton, New Brunswick, Oct. 17–20	(New Brunswick) Scott Jones	(Nova Scotia) Jamie Murphy	$5,500	$2,400	1.8682
13	Stroud Sleeman Cash Spiel; Stroud, Ontario, Oct. 17–20	(Ontario) Sandy MacEwan	(Ontario) Jason Camm	$14,000	$3,800	3.1408
14	**Masters**; North Bay, Ontario, Oct. 22–27	(Saskatchewan) Matt Dunstone	(Newfoundland and Labrador) Brad Gushue	$150,000	$35,000	12.1055
14	Atlantic Superstore Monctonian Challenge; Moncton, New Brunswick, Oct. 25–27	(New Brunswick) Scott Jones	(New Brunswick) Ed Cyr	$11,200	$3,100	2.5365
14	Kamloops Crown of Curling; Kamloops, British Columbia, Oct. 25–27	(Japan) Yuta Matsumura	(British Columbia) Tyler Tardi	$16,000	$5,000	3.0568
14	Atkins Curling Supplies Classic; Winnipeg, Manitoba, Oct. 25–28	(Manitoba) Braden Calvert	(United States) Korey Dropkin	$12,300	$3,500	3.4547
14	Blazing Leaves; Bridgeport, Connecticut, Oct. 24–27	(United States) Robert Kwan	(United States) Stephen Imes	$4,600 (US)	$1,400 (US)	1.3129
14	Latvia International Challenger; Tukums, Latvia, Oct. 24–27	(Sweden) Daniel Magnusson	(Switzerland) Lucien Lottenbach	€ 3,000	€ 1,400	1.7934
14	Moose Jaw Cash Spiel; Moose Jaw, Saskatchewan, Oct. 25–27	(Saskatchewan) Brent Gedak	(Saskatchewan) Brady Kendel	$6,800	$1,905	1.9992
15	DeKalb Superspiel; Morris, Manitoba, Nov. 1–4	(Manitoba) Tanner Horgan	(Manitoba) Mike McEwen	$33,800	$9,900	5.2526
15	Dave Jones Stanhope Simpson Insurance Mayflower Cashspiel; Halifax, Nova Scotia, Nov. 1–3	(Quebec) Vincent Roberge	(Nova Scotia) Stuart Thompson	$20,000	$4,000	3.9406
15	Grand Prix Bern Inter Curling Challenge; Bern, Switzerland, Nov. 1–3	(Italy) Joël Retornaz	(Scotland) Ross Whyte	CHF 18,100	CHF 5,000	3.9999
15	Challenge Nord-Ouest Air Creebec; Laval, Quebec, Nov. 1–3	(Quebec) Mark Homan	(Quebec) Gerry Savoie	$12,500	$3,100	1.9065
16	**Kioti Tractor Tour Challenge Tier 1** Westville Road, Nova Scotia, Nov. 5–10	(Ontario) Brad Jacobs	(Newfoundland and Labrador) Brad Gushue	$120,000	$30,000	10.8113
16	Kioti Tractor Tour Challenge Tier 2 Westville Road, Nova Scotia, Nov. 5–10	(United States) Korey Dropkin	(Manitoba) Tanner Horgan	$50,000	$10,000	6.3000
16	Original 16 WCT Bonspiel; Calgary, Alberta, Nov. 8–10	(Alberta) Jeremy Harty	(Alberta) Daylan Vavrek	$25,000	$6,200	3.6858
16	Raymond James Kelowna Double Cash; Kelowna, British Columbia, Nov. 9–11	(British Columbia) Daniel Wenzek	(British Columbia) Jeff Richard	$25,000	$5,500	2.7641
16	Prague Classic; Prague, Czech Republic, Nov. 7–10	(Scotland) Ross Whyte	(Poland) Borys Jasiecki	€ 15,500	€ 5,000	2.4799
16	Carberry King Spud Classic - Berth Spiel; Carberry, Manitoba, Nov. 8–10	(Manitoba) Steve Irwin	(Manitoba) Jordan Smith	$6,500	$2,000	2.0268
16	Regina Highland Cashspiel; Regina, Saskatchewan, Nov. 8-10	(Saskatchewan) Jason Jacobson	(Saskatchewan) Brad Heidt	$8,000	$3,030	2.6090
16	COMCO Cash Spiel; Innisfil, Ontario, Nov. 8-10	(Ontario) Richard Krell	(Ontario) Cory Heggestad	$12,000	$3,000	2.5400
17	Stu Sells 1824 Halifax Classic; Halifax, Nova Scotia, Nov. 14–17	(Ontario) Glenn Howard	(Nova Scotia) Jamie Murphy	$35,000	$11,000	5.1071
17	Red Deer Curling Classic; Red Deer, Alberta, Nov. 15–18	(Alberta) James Pahl	(British Columbia) Tyler Tardi	$35,000	$10,000	5.1825
18	Ashley HomeStore Curling Classic; Penticton, British Columbia, Nov. 22–25	(Alberta) Brendan Bottcher	(Manitoba) Mike McEwen	$84,000	$20,000	9.5000
18	The Sunova Spiel at East St. Paul; East St. Paul, Manitoba, Nov. 22–25	(Manitoba) Sean Grassie	(Manitoba) Corey Chambers	$10,500	$2,900	3.4646
18	Challenge Casino de Charlevoix; Clermont, Quebec, Nov. 21–24	(Ontario) Scott McDonald	(Quebec) Vincent Roberge	$27,000	$8,000	4.2546
18	Black Diamond / High River Cash; Black Diamond, Alberta & High River, Alberta, Nov. 22–24	(China) Zou Qiang	(Alberta) Jeremy Harty	$7,100	$2,000	2.2495
19	Home Hardware Canada Cup; Leduc, Alberta, Nov. 27–Dec. 1	(Ontario) John Epping	(Alberta) Kevin Koe	$265,000	$40,000	11.6853
19	College Clean Restoration Curling Classic; Saskatoon, Saskatchewan, Nov. 29–Dec. 2	(Alberta) Jeremy Harty	(Saskatchewan) Bruce Korte	$24,200	$6,000	5.2107
19	Curl Mesabi Classic; Eveleth, Minnesota, Nov. 29–Dec. 1	(United States) Korey Dropkin	(United States) Rich Ruohonen	$14,000 (US)	$5,315	3.5571
19	Brantford Nissan Classic; Paris, Ontario, Nov. 29–Dec. 1	(Ontario) Wayne Tuck Jr.	(Ontario) Codey Maus	$16,000	$5,000	3.7534
19	Thistle Integrity Stakes; Winnipeg, Manitoba, Nov. 29–Dec. 2	(Manitoba) Sean Grassie	(Manitoba) Steve Irwin	$4,800	$1,300	2.2539
20	Jim Sullivan Curling Classic; Saint John, New Brunswick, Dec. 6–8	(New Brunswick) James Grattan	(New Brunswick) Scott Jones	$15,300	$5,000	2.6670
20	Changan Ford International Curling Elite; Xining, Qinghai, China Dec. 5–10	(United States) Rich Ruohonen	(Netherlands) Jaap van Dorp	225,000 (CNY)	120,000 (CNY)	4.5563
20	MCT Championships; Winnipeg, Manitoba, Dec. 6–8	(Manitoba) Ryan Wiebe	(Manitoba) Dennis Bohn	$6,000	$2,400	3.1500
20	Farmers Edge SCT; Wadena, Saskatchewan, Dec. 6–8	(Saskatchewan) Shaun Meachem	(Scotland) Glen Muirhead	$13,000	$5,000	2.4941
21	**Boost National**; Conception Bay South, Newfoundland and Labrador, Dec. 10–15	(Ontario) Brad Jacobs	(Sweden) Niklas Edin	$150,000	$35,000	12.1055
21	China Open; Tianjin, China Dec. 13–17	(South Korea) Kim Chang-min	(United States) Korey Dropkin	250,000 (CNY)	40,000 (CNY)	4.6406
21	Dumfries Challenger Series; Dumfries, Scotland, Dec. 12–15	(Scotland) Ross Whyte	(Switzerland) Lucien Lottenbach	£ 7,500	£ 4,000	3.1064
22	Karuizawa International; Karuizawa, Japan, Dec. 19–22	(Japan) Yuta Matsumura	(Sweden) Niklas Edin	¥ 4,000,000	¥ 1,300,000	4.8050
22	Schweizer Cup; Biel, Switzerland, Dec. 19–22	(Switzerland) Peter de Cruz	(Switzerland) Lucien Lottenbach	CHF 11,000	CHF 5,000	3.5994
24	Mercure Perth Masters; Perth, Scotland, Jan. 2–5	(Scotland) Bruce Mouat	(Manitoba) Mike McEwen	£ 17,000	£ 7,000	7.0137
24	Centennial Spiel; St. John's, Newfoundland and Labrador, Jan. 2–5	(Newfoundland and Labrador) Trent Skanes	(Newfoundland and Labrador) Andrew Symonds	$6,000	$2,400	1.3713
24	KKP Classic; Winnipeg, Manitoba, Jan. 3–5	(Manitoba) Daniel Birchard	(Manitoba) Corey Chambers	$5,500	$2,000	2.9823
24	Vic Open Assurances Jean Gamache; Quebec, Quebec, Jan. 3–5	(Quebec) Vincent Roberge	(Quebec) Benoit Gagné	$3,500	$1,000	1.8922
25	Ed Werenich Golden Wrench Classic presented by The Lodge Sasquatch Kitchen; Tempe, Arizona, Jan. 9–12	(Manitoba) Jason Gunnlaugson	(United States) Rich Ruohonen	$22,000 (US)	$8,000 (US)	4.9626
25	Keijinkai Rizing Cup; Miyota, Japan, Jan. 11–13	(Japan) Tsuyoshi Yamaguchi	(Japan) Junpei Kanda	¥ 1,000,000	¥ 500,000	1.5164
26	**Meridian Canadian Open**; Yorkton, Saskatchewan, Jan. 14–19	(Ontario) Brad Jacobs	(Ontario) John Epping	$150,000	$35,000	12.066
29	Moscow Classic; Moscow, Russia, Feb. 4–7	(Italy) Joël Retornaz	(Germany) Sixten Totzek	$10,000 (US)	$5,316	1.4480
29	Red Square Classic; Moscow, Russia, Feb. 8–10	(Russia) Aleksandr Kirikov	(Russia) Alexey Timofeev	$10,000 (US)	$5,316	1.4818
34	Aberdeen International Curling Championship; Aberdeen, Scotland, Mar. 12–15	(Switzerland) Yannick Schwaller	(Scotland) Ross Paterson	£ 9,100	£ 2,500	4.8487
35	Avonair Tour Spring Fling; Edmonton, Alberta, Mar. 20–22	Cancelled				
36	Alberta Tour Windup; Beaumont, Alberta, Mar. 26–29	Cancelled				
38	**Princess Auto Players' Championship**; Toronto, Ontario, Apr. 7–12	Cancelled				
41	**Humpty's Champions Cup**; Olds, Alberta, Apr. 29–May 3	Cancelled				
44	WCT Arctic Cup; Dudinka, Russia, May 21–25	Postponed				

=== Women's events ===
Week	Event	Winning skip	Runner-up skip	Purse (CAD)	Winner's share (CAD)	SFM
1	Morioka City Womens Memorial Cup; Morioka, Japan, Jun. 29–30	(Japan) Tori Koana	(Japan) Risa Tsujimura	¥ 160,000	¥ 80,000	
2	Hokkaido Bank Curling Classic; Hokkaido, Japan, Aug. 1–4	(China) Jiang Yilun	(Japan) Satsuki Fujisawa	¥ 1,700,000	¥ 1,000,000	5.9231
3	ADVICS Cup; Kitami, Japan, Aug. 9–12	(Japan) Satsuki Fujisawa	(China) Mei Jie	¥ 1,700,000	¥ 1,000,000	5.3625
5	Cargill Curling Training Centre Icebreaker; Morris, Manitoba, Aug. 23–25	(Manitoba) Tracy Fleury	(Japan) Tori Koana	$7,480	$2,230	4.8419
6	Cameron's Brewing Oakville Fall Classic; Oakville, Ontario, Aug. 30–Sept. 2	(Scotland) Eve Muirhead	(Switzerland) Silvana Tirinzoni	$11,500	$3,000	7.2265
7	Stu Sells Oakville Tankard; Oakville, Ontario, Sept. 5–8	(Sweden) Anna Hasselborg	(Russia) Anna Sidorova	$36,000	$8,000	8.3979
8	AMJ Campbell Shorty Jenkins Classic; Cornwall, Ontario, Sept. 10–15	(Manitoba) Jennifer Jones	(Manitoba) Tracy Fleury	$34,500	$10,000	9.3749
8	Booster Juice Shoot-Out; Edmonton, Alberta Sept. 12–15	(Manitoba) Kerri Einarson	(Alberta) Chelsea Carey	$32,000	$8,000	7.7135
8	King Cash Spiel; Maple Ridge, British Columbia, Sept. 13–15	(British Columbia) Kristen Ryan	(British Columbia) Sarah Daniels	$7,000	$3,000	2.5131
8	Obihiro Ice Gold Cup; Obihiro, Japan, Sept. 13–14	(Japan) Misaki Tanaka	(Japan) Mizuki Hara	¥ 950,000	¥ 500,000	2.4375
9	Beyer & Simonson US Open of Curling - Championships; Blaine, Minnesota, Sept. 19–22	(United States) Nina Roth	(United States) Cassie Potter	$6,500 (US)	$3,990 (US)	2.7193
9	KW Fall Classic; Waterloo, Ontario, Sept. 19–22	(South Korea) Gim Un-chi	(Ontario) Megan Balsdon	$11,300	$3,000	5.0229
9	Mother Club Fall Curling Classic; Winnipeg, Manitoba, Sept. 19–22	(Alberta) Laura Walker	(Manitoba) Theresa Cannon	$6,000	$2,000	3.5175
9	Cabot Spiel; St. John's, Newfoundland and Labrador, Sept. 20–22	(Newfoundland and Labrador) Heather Strong	(Newfoundland and Labrador) Stacie Curtis	$2,400	$1,200	
9	The Good Times Bonspiel; Calgary Alberta, Sept. 20–22	(Alberta) Kayla Skrlik	(Russia) Alina Kovaleva	$3,600	$1,000	2.5358
10	Colonial Square Ladies Classic; Saskatoon, Saskatchewan, Sept. 27-30	(Ontario) Rachel Homan	(Manitoba) Tracy Fleury	$30,000	$7,500	7.0328
10	The Curling Store Cashspiel; Lower Sackville, Nova Scotia, Sept. 27–29	(Nova Scotia) Mary-Anne Arsenault	(Nova Scotia) Jill Brothers	$5,350	$2,100	2.6631
11	WCT Uiseong International Curling Cup; Uiseong, South Korea, Sept. 30–Oct. 3	(United States) Tabitha Peterson	(South Korea) Kim Kyeong-ae	₩ 55,000,000	₩ 25,000,000	6.5325
11	Prestige Hotels & Resorts Curling Classic; Vernon, British Columbia, Oct. 3–6	(Alberta) Kelsey Rocque	(Alberta) Chelsea Carey	$31,500	$7,000	5.2827
11	Paf Masters Tour; Åland, Finland, Oct. 3–6	(Sweden) Isabella Wranå	(Switzerland) Irene Schori	€ 18,000	€ 8,000	3.7240
11	Stu Sells Toronto Tankard; Toronto, Ontario, Oct. 3–6	(Ontario) Kira Brunton	(Ontario) Cathy Auld	$17,000	$5,000	4.7916
11	Avonair Cash Spiel; Edmonton, Alberta, Oct. 3–6	(Alberta) Marla Sherrer	(Alberta) Kaitlin Stubbs	$10,000	$3,000	3.1050
11	Let's Cure Lupus St. Paul Cash Spiel; St. Paul, Minnesota, Oct. 4–6	(United States) Cora Farrell	(United States) Kim Rhyme	$6,000 (US)	$1,600 (US)	2.0747
11	Manitoba Curling Tour Classic; Winnipeg, Manitoba, Oct. 3–6	(Manitoba) Meghan Walter	(Manitoba) Abby Ackland	$5,400	$2,000	2.4366
11	Regina Callie Rockoberfest; Regina, Saskatchewan, Oct. 4–6	(Saskatchewan) Lorraine Schneider	(Saskatchewan) Rae Ann Williamson	$6,400	$2,000	2.6325
12	Curlers Corner Autumn Gold Curling Classic; Calgary, Alberta, Oct. 11–14	(Manitoba) Kerri Einarson	(Alberta) Cheryl Bernard	$44,000	$12,000	9.7701
12	Women's Masters Basel; Basel, Switzerland, Oct. 11-13	(Switzerland) Silvana Tirinzoni	(Sweden) Isabella Wranå	CHF 32,000	CHF 10,000	5.6438
12	Driving Force Decks Int'l Abbotsford Cashspiel; Abbotsford, British Columbia, Oct. 11–14	(British Columbia) Corryn Brown	(British Columbia) Brette Richards	$15,800	$4,000	2.7380
12	New Scotland Clothing Ladies Cashspiel; Halifax, Nova Scotia, Oct. 11-14	(Nova Scotia) Mary Mattatall	(Nova Scotia) Tanya Hilliard	$5,000	$1,750	2.8896
13	Canad Inns Women's Classic; Portage la Prairie, Manitoba, Oct. 17–20	(Switzerland) Elena Stern	(Ontario) Rachel Homan	$60,000	$15,000	11.3952
13	Medicine Hat Charity Classic; Medicine Hat, Alberta, Oct. 18–21	(Alberta) Kayla Skrlik	(China) Wang Meini	$24,000	$6,000	2.7424
13	Steele Cup Cash; Fredericton, New Brunswick, Oct. 17–20	(New Brunswick) Andrea Crawford	(New Brunswick) Sylvie Quillian	$3,000	$1,200	
13	Stroud Sleeman Cash Spiel; Stroud, Ontario, Oct. 17–20	(Quebec) Julie Tippin	(Ontario) Krista McCarville	$10,500	$3,300	3.0729
14	**Masters**; North Bay, Ontario, Oct. 22–27	(Manitoba) Tracy Fleury	(Japan) Sayaka Yoshimura	$150,000	$35,000	12.0416
14	Atlantic Superstore Monctonian Challenge; Moncton, New Brunswick, Oct. 25–27	(New Brunswick) Andrea Crawford	(Prince Edward Island) Suzanne Birt	$10,000	$2,600	3.1081
14	Kamloops Crown of Curling; Kamloops, British Columbia, Oct. 25–27	(British Columbia) Corryn Brown	(China) Han Siyu	$9,950	$4,000	2.9597
14	Gord Carroll Curling Classic; Whitby, Ontario, Oct. 25–27	(Switzerland) Irene Schori	(Ontario) Julie Hastings	$15,100	$4,500	4.5777
14	Atkins Curling Supplies Classic; Winnipeg, Manitoba, Oct. 25–28	(Manitoba) Abby Ackland	(Manitoba) Beth Peterson	$6,200	$2,600	2.5867
14	Latvia International Challenger; Tukums, Latvia, Oct. 24–27	(Norway) Maia Ramsfjell	(Latvia) Iveta Staša-Šaršūne	€ 3,000	€ 1,400	1.7072
14	Highland SWCT Event; Regina, Saskatchewan, Oct. 25–27	(Saskatchewan) Penny Barker	(Saskatchewan) Sherry Anderson	$6,300	$1,700	2.4699
15	DeKalb Superspiel; Morris, Manitoba, Nov. 1–4	(Alberta) Laura Walker	(Manitoba) Mackenzie Zacharias	$26,700	$8,300	4.5594
15	Royal LePage Women's Fall Classic; Kemptville, Ontario, Oct. 31–Nov. 3	(Sweden) Isabella Wranå	(Ontario) Krista McCarville	$21,000	$6,000	4.6406
15	Dave Jones Stanhope Simpson Insurance Mayflower Cashspiel; Halifax, Nova Scotia, Nov. 1–3	(Japan) Tori Koana	(Nova Scotia) Theresa Breen	$7,500	$3,000	2.8595
15	Tallinn Ladies International Challenger; Tallinn, Estonia, Nov. 1–3	(Estonia) Marie Turmann	(Switzerland) Nora Wüest	€ 4,000	€ 1,200	2.3365
15	Saskatoon Nutana SWCT Event; Saskatoon, Saskatchewan, Nov. 1–3	(Saskatchewan) Penny Barker	(Saskatchewan) Jane Tisdale	$7,200	$1,500	2.7514
16	**Kioti Tractor Tour Challenge Tier 1** Westville Road, Nova Scotia, Nov. 5–10	(Sweden) Anna Hasselborg	(Manitoba) Kerri Einarson	$120,000	$30,000	10.9275
16	Kioti Tractor Tour Challenge Tier 2 Westville Road, Nova Scotia, Nov. 5–10	(South Korea) Kim Min-ji	(Ontario) Jestyn Murphy	$50,000	$10,000	6.0375
16	Sunset Ranch Kelowna Double Cash; Kelowna, British Columbia, Nov. 9–11	(Japan) Tori Koana	(Alberta) Nicky Kaufman	$9,000	$3,000	2.8001
17	Red Deer Curling Classic; Red Deer, Alberta, Nov. 15–18	(United States) Jamie Sinclair	(British Columbia) Brette Richards	$35,000	$10,000	6.4714
18	Boundary Ford Curling Classic; Lloydminster, Saskatchewan, Nov. 22–25	(South Korea) Kim Min-ji	(South Korea) Gim Un-chi	$27,000	$8,000	5.2567
18	Tim Hortons Spitfire Arms Cash Spiel; Windsor, Nova Scotia, Nov. 22–24	(Prince Edward Island) Suzanne Birt	(New Brunswick) Sylvie Quillian	$14,000	$4,000	3.5595
18	The Sunova Spiel at East St. Paul; East St. Paul, Manitoba, Nov. 22–25	(Manitoba) Mackenzie Zacharias	(Manitoba) Darcy Robertson	$7,300	$2,900	2.9328
19	Home Hardware Canada Cup; Leduc, Alberta, Nov. 27–Dec. 1	(Ontario) Rachel Homan	(Manitoba) Tracy Fleury	$265,000	$40,000	11.1447
19	Curl Mesabi Classic; Eveleth, Minnesota, Nov. 29–Dec. 1	(Ontario) Krista McCarville	(Alberta) Laura Walker	$16,000 (US)	$6,644	4.3468
19	Part II Bistro Ladies Classic; Wingham, Ontario, Nov. 29–Dec. 1	(Ontario) Katelyn Wasylkiw	(Ontario) Jestyn Murphy	$10,000	$3,000	3.7125
20	Jim Sullivan Curling Classic; Saint John, New Brunswick, Dec. 6–8	(South Korea) Gim Un-chi	(Prince Edward Island) Suzanne Birt	$8,250	$2,000	2.5792
20	Changan Ford International Curling Elite; Xining, Qinghai, China Dec. 5–10	(Russia) Alina Kovaleva	(South Korea) Kim Eun-jung	225,000 (CNY)	120,000 (CNY)	4.2469
21	**Boost National**; Conception Bay South, Newfoundland and Labrador, Dec. 10–15	(Sweden) Anna Hasselborg	(Manitoba) Jennifer Jones	$150,000	$35,000	11.8711
21	China Open; Tianjin, China Dec. 13–17	(Russia) Alina Kovaleva	(British Columbia) Corryn Brown	250,000 (CNY)	40,000 (CNY)	4.6969
22	Karuizawa International; Karuizawa, Japan, Dec. 19–22	(Russia) Anna Sidorova	(Japan) Satsuki Fujisawa	¥ 4,000,000	¥ 1,300,000	5.7750
22	Schweizer Cup; Biel, Switzerland, Dec. 19–22	(Switzerland) Elena Stern	(Switzerland) Nora Wüest	CHF 11,000	CHF 5,000	4.5328
24	Mercure Perth Masters; Perth, Scotland, Jan. 2–5	(Scotland) Eve Muirhead	(Scotland) Maggie Wilson	£ 10,500	£ 4,500	4.8077
25	International Bernese Ladies Cup; Bern, Switzerland, Jan. 9–12	(Switzerland) Elena Stern	(China) Han Yu	CHF 21,500	CHF 6,000	6.1589
26	**Meridian Canadian Open**; Yorkton, Saskatchewan, Jan. 14–19	(Sweden) Anna Hasselborg	(South Korea) Kim Min-ji	$150,000	$35,000	12.2100
26	Glynhill Ladies International; Glasgow, Scotland, Jan. 16–19	(South Korea) Kim Eun-jung	(Sweden) Isabella Wranå	£ 10,600	£ 4,000	4.8156
35	Avonair Tour Spring Fling; Edmonton, Alberta Mar. 20–22	Cancelled				
38	**Princess Auto Players' Championship**; Toronto, Ontario, Apr. 7–12	Cancelled				
41	**Humpty's Champions Cup**; Olds, Alberta, Apr. 29–May 3	Cancelled				

=== Mixed doubles events ===
Week	Event	Winning pair	Runner-up pair	Purse (CAD)	Winner's share (CAD)	SFM
1	China Open Mixed Doubles; Hebei, China, Jun. 23–27	(Manitoba) Peterman / (Newfoundland and Labrador) Gallant	(United States) Anderson / Dropkin	350,000 (CNY)	$28,560	7.3719
6	New Zealand Winter Games Mixed Doubles; Naseby, New Zealand, Aug. 27–30	(South Korea) Jang / Seong	(Australia) Gill / Hewitt	$6,000 (NZD)		3.1562
6	Battleford Mixed Doubles Fall Curling Classic; North Battleford, Saskatchewan, Aug. 30–Sept. 2	(Sweden) Mabergs / (Saskatchewan) Scharback	(Saskatchewan) Haupstein / Pomedli	$6,750	$1,620	2.9659
7	WCT Pacific Open Cup; Vladivostok, Russia, Sept. 2–6	(Australia) Gill / Hewitt	(South Korea) Song / Jeon	$10,000 (US)	$5,303	3.7761
7	GOLDLINE Boucherville Mixed Doubles; Boucherville, Quebec, Sept. 6–8	(Ontario) K. Cottrill / S. Cottrill	(Quebec) É. Desjardins / R. Desjardins	$1,530	$360	3.0981
7	Oberstdorf International Mixed Doubles Cup; Oberstdorf, Germany, Sept. 6–8	(Germany) Kapp / Muskatewitz	(Switzerland) Rupp / Wunderlin	€ 3,530	$1,167	5.1094
9	WCT Tallinn Mixed Doubles International; Tallinn, Estonia, Sep. 20-22	(Norway) Skaslien / Nedregotten	(Czech Republic) Paulová / Paul	€ 1,200	$875	7.2857
9	College Clean Restoration/Colonial Square Inn & Suites Pro Curling Series; Saskatoon, Saskatchewan, Sep. 20-22	(Saskatchewan) Quick / Armstrong	(Saskatchewan) de Gooijer / Springer	$6,400	$1,600	3.3842
10	Colorado Curling Cup; Denver, Colorado, Sep. 27-29	(United States) Anderson / Dropkin	(Ontario) Brunton / (Alberta) Morris	$15,000 (US)	$5,305	4.2890
10	Brampton Mixed Doubles Curling Cup; Brampton, Ontario, Sep. 28-29	(Ontario) Grandy / Janssen	(Quebec) É. Desjardins / R. Desjardins	$4,500	$800	3.5085
11	International Mixed Doubles St. Gallen; St. Gallen, Switzerland, Oct. 3-6	(Czech Republic) Paulová / Paul	(Sweden) Westman / Ahlberg	CHF 6,500	$2,671	4.6980
11	Sherwood Park Mixed Doubles Classic; Edmonton, Alberta, Oct. 4-6	(Alberta) A. Nedohin / D. Nedohin	(Alberta) H. Nedohin / Moulding	$2,350	$700	2.7264
12	Norway Open Mixed Doubles; Hedmarken, Norway, Oct. 11-13	(Denmark) C. Grønbech / M. Grønbech	(Norway) Rørvik / Nergård	NOK 10,000	$729	3.0840
13	WCT Austrian Mixed Doubles Cup; Kitzbühel, Austria, Oct. 17-20	(Norway) Skaslien / Nedregotten	(Hungary) Palancsa / Kiss	€ 3,500	$1,770	4.6893
13	GOLDLINE Amos Mixed Doubles; Amos, Quebec, Oct. 17-20	(Quebec) G. Simard / P. Simard	(Quebec) Lavoie / Gravel	$570	$120	1.9635
14	WCT Mixed Doubles Cup Geising; Geising, Germany, Oct. 24-27	(Hungary) Palancsa / Kiss	(Russia) Morozova / Goriachev	€ 3,500	€ 1,300	3.7052
15	ISS Mixed Doubles Lodz; Łódź, Poland, Oct. 31-Nov. 3	(Hungary) Szerkeres / Nagy	(China) Fan / Nan	€ 3,000	$1,475	4.4760
15	MadTown DoubleDown presented by Leinenkugel; Madison, Wisconsin, Nov. 1-3	(Sweden) Hasselborg / Eriksson	(Norway) Skaslien / Nedregotten	$24,000 (US)	$9,321	6.1117
15	Palmerston Mixed Doubles Spiel; Palmerston, Ontario, Nov. 2-3	(Ontario) C. Kidd / B. Kidd	(Ontario) N. Stewart / T. Stewart	$3,000	$1,000	2.9681
16	International Mixed Doubles Sochi; Sochi, Russia, Nov. 7-10	(Switzerland) Perret / Rios	(Russia) Fomina / Stukalskiy	$10,000 (US)	$4,661	4.7989
16	GOLDLINE Clermont Mixed Doubles; Clermont, Quebec, Nov. 8-10	(New Brunswick) Adams / Robichaud	(Quebec) Poisson / Dubois	$1,250	$250	1.6018
17	Canad Inns Mixed Doubles Championship; Portage la Prairie, Manitoba, Nov. 15-17	(Manitoba) Jones / (Ontario) Laing	(Russia) Moskaleva / Eremin	$26,000	$8,500	5.6227
17	Mixed Doubles Bern; Bern, Switzerland, Nov. 15-17	(Switzerland) Rupp / Wunderlin	(Scotland) Aitken / Andrews	CHF 12,000	$5,382	7.3707
18	Ilderton Mixed Doubles Spiel; Ilderton, Ontario Nov. 22–24	(Ontario) Tuck / Tuck Jr.	(Ontario) Wilson / Dow	$3,200	$1,000	2.9001
20	GOLDLINE Victoria Mixed Doubles; Quebec City, Quebec, Dec. 6-8	(Quebec) M. Hebert / S. Hebert	(Quebec) St-Georges / Asselin	$1,500	$400	2.3539
20	Bele Wranå Memorial; Sundbyberg, Sweden, Dec. 6-8	(Sweden) Andersson / Granbom	(Estonia) Turmann / Lill	SEK 11,000	$701	2.8296
21	Italian Mixed Doubles Cup; Pinerolo, Italy, Dec. 12-15	(Norway) Skaslien / Nedregotten	(Switzerland) Perret / Rios	€ 3,000	$1,462	5.4341
21	Bayview Mixed Doubles; Toronto, Ontario, Dec. 14-15	(Ontario) Little / Lyon-Hatcher	(Ontario) Sutherland / Ryn	$4,400	$1,200	3.3712
22	Aberdeen Mixed Doubles Championship; Aberdeen, Scotland, Dec. 20-22	(Scotland) Muirhead / Lammie	(Scotland) Wright / Hardie	GBP 5,000	$3,422	3.8538
22	Schweizer Cup; Biel, Switzerland, Dec. 20-22	(Switzerland) Perret / Rios	(Switzerland) Jäggi / Pfister	CHF 5,500	CHF 2,500	4.4373
22	ISS WCT Moscow Mixed Doubles; Moscow, Russia, Dec. 20-24	(Russia) Moskaleva / Eremin	(Russia) Dudko / Velichko	$5,000 (US)	$2,000	3.0953
22	STP Mixed Doubles; St. Paul, Alberta, Dec. 20-22	(Alberta) H. Nedohin / Robinson	(Alberta) A. Nedohin / D. Nedohin	$2,000	$500	2.1707
23	Southern Mixed Doubles; Charlotte, North Carolina, Dec. 27–29	(Manitoba) Peterman / (Newfoundland and Labrador) Gallant	(United States) Bear / Stopera	$4,000 (US)	$1,250 (US)	2.9213
23	Gothenburg Mixed Doubles Cup; Gothenburg, Sweden, Dec. 28–30	(Switzerland) Jäggi / Pfister	(Norway) Rønning / Brænden	SEK 17,000	$979	2.7071
24	Qualico Mixed Doubles Classic; Banff, Alberta, Jan. 2-5	(Alberta) Homan / Morris	(United States) Anderson / Dropkin	$30,000	$8,500	7.6392
24	WCT-Japan Nayoro Mixed Doubles Spiel; Nayoro, Japan, Jan 3-5	(Japan) T. Takeda / N. Takeda	(Japan) Hara / Daishi	¥ 900		0.9485
25	Brantford Mixed Doubles Cashspiel; Brantford, Ontario, Jan. 10-12	(Saskatchewan) Martin / (British Columbia) Griffith	(China) Fan / Nan	$25,000	$4,000	6.3834
25	WCT Dutch Masters Mixed Doubles; Zoertermeer, Netherlands, Jan. 10-12	(Sweden) Heldin / Lindström	(Germany) Kapp / Muskatewitz	€1,250	$718	4.9951
25	GOLDLINE Valleyfield Mixed Doubles; Salaberry-de-Valleyfield, Quebec, Jan. 10-12	(Quebec) Laplante / Gibeau	(Quebec) Sanscartier / Caron	$1,500	$310	1.6062
26	Stu Sells Toronto Cricket Mixed Doubles Cashspiel; Toronto, Ontario, Jan. 17–20	(Ontario) Tuck / Tuck Jr.	(China) Wang / (Alberta) Kleibrink	$15,000	$5,000	4.8708
27	Gefle Mixed Doubles Cup; Gävle, Sweden, Jan. 23–26	(Hungary) Palancsa / Kiss	(Finland) O. Kauste / A. Kauste	3,100 kr	€1,400	4.7919
28	Goldline Chicoutimi Mixed Doubles; Chicoutimi, Quebec, Jan. 31–Feb. 2	(Quebec) É. Desjardins / R. Desjardins	(Quebec) Bouchard / Charest	$2,500		1.9484
28	International Mixed Doubles Trophy Aarau; Aarau, Switzerland, Jan. 31–Feb. 2	(Switzerland) Rupp / Wunderlin	(Norway) Skaslien / Nedregotten	7,000 CHF	2,600 CHF	6.3329
28	Oshawa Curling Club Mixed Doubles Spiel; Oshawa, Ontario, Jan. 31–Feb. 2	(Ontario) Grandy / Janssen	(China) Yang / Ling	$3,000		2.4589
29	Sutherland Mixed Doubles Curling Classic; Saskatoon Saskatchewan, Feb. 7–9	(Saskatchewan) Kitz / Stewart	(Australia) Gill / Hewitt	$6,400		3.5953
29	Hvidovre Mixed Doubles Cup; Hvidovre, Denmark, Feb. 7–9	(Denmark) Lander / Holtermann	(Denmark) Jensen / Vilandt	10,000 kr.		1.8673
30	WCT Tallinn Masters Mixed Doubles; Tallinn, Estonia, Feb. 14–16	(Russia) Moksaleva / Eremin	(Norway) Skaslien / Nedregotten	€3,000	€1,200	5.4160
30	Highland Mixed Doubles Classic; Regina, Saskatchewan, Feb. 14–16	(Saskatchewan) Campbell / (British Columbia) Dunstone	(Switzerland) Albrecht / (Manitoba) Wozniak	$8,500	$2,000	5.2485
31	Ontario Mixed Doubles Tour Championship; Wingham, Ontario, Feb. 21–23	(Ontario) Grandy / Janssen	(Hungary) Palancsa / Kiss	$8,000	$2,000	4.5409
32	International Mixed Doubles Sochi; Sochi, Russia, Feb. 27–Mar. 1	(Russia) Trukhina / Lysakov	(Russia) Ezekh / Glukhov	$10,000	$3,500	
33	Slovakia Mixed Doubles Curling Cup; Bratislava, Slovakia, Mar. 5–8	(Hungary) Szekeres / Nagy	(Poland) Szeliga-Frynia / Frynia	€2,800		

== WCT rankings ==
Men

Final Standings
#	Skip	YTD	OOM
1	(Ontario) Brad Jacobs	482.484	482.484
2	(Ontario) John Epping	444.189	444.189
3	(Newfoundland and Labrador) Brad Gushue	392.540	392.540
4	(Alberta) Brendan Bottcher	345.627	345.627
5	(Scotland) Bruce Mouat	343.005	343.005
6	(Manitoba) Mike McEwen	316.593	316.593
7	(Switzerland) Yannick Schwaller	314.415	314.415
8	(Sweden) Niklas Edin	304.836	304.836
9	(Switzerland) Peter de Cruz	289.136	289.136
10	(Alberta) Kevin Koe	276.488	276.488

Women

Final Standings
#	Skip	YTD	OOM
1	(Sweden) Anna Hasselborg	467.461	467.461
2	(Manitoba) Kerri Einarson	420.070	420.070
3	(Manitoba) Tracy Fleury	404.325	404.325
4	(Japan) Satsuki Fujisawa	342.872	342.872
5	(Manitoba) Jennifer Jones	341.765	341.765
6	(Switzerland) Elena Stern	333.591	333.591
7	(Switzerland) Silvana Tirinzoni	331.193	331.193
8	(Ontario) Rachel Homan	325.932	325.932
9	(Scotland) Eve Muirhead	283.984	283.984
10	(United States) Tabitha Peterson	245.428	245.428

=== Money list ===
Men

As of February 4
#	Skip	$ (CAD)
1	(Ontario) Brad Jacobs	$138,500
2	(Manitoba) Mike McEwen	$94,136
3	(Scotland) Bruce Mouat	$79,122
4	(Newfoundland and Labrador) Brad Gushue	$76,900
5	(Ontario) John Epping	$71,900
6	(Alberta) Brendan Bottcher	$60,909
7	(Sweden) Niklas Edin	$58,805
8	(Switzerland) Peter de Cruz	$54,574
9	(Saskatchewan) Matt Dunstone	$51,900
10	(Alberta) Kevin Koe	$46,900

Women

As of February 4
#	Skip	$ (CAD)
1	(Sweden) Anna Hasselborg	$123,210
2	(Japan) Satsuki Fujisawa	$93,265
3	(Manitoba) Tracy Fleury	$85,730
4	(Switzerland) Silvana Tirinzoni	$78,886
5	(Manitoba) Kerri Einarson	$70,500
6	(Manitoba) Jennifer Jones	$65,550
7	(United States) Tabitha Peterson	$62,712
8	(Switzerland) Elena Stern	$52,652
9	(South Korea) Kim Min-ji	$46,251
10	(Sweden) Isabella Wranå	$41,517

Preceded by 2018–19	2019–20 curling season June 2019 – May 2020	Succeeded by 2020–21
