= List of teams on the 2019–20 World Curling Tour =

Following is a list of teams on the 2019–20 World Curling Tour, which was part of the 2019–20 curling season. Only the skips of the teams are listed. For mixed doubles teams, both members of the team are listed.

== Men ==
As of August 22, 2019

Skip	Locale
Cole Adams	Calgary, Alberta
Rob Ainsley	Toronto, Ontario
Steve Allen	Ottawa, Ontario
Ted Appelman	Edmonton, Alberta
Tomoji Arai	Tokyo, Japan
Todd Birr	(United States) Ham Lake, Minnesota
Brendan Bottcher	Edmonton, Alberta
Daniel Bruce	St. John's, Newfoundland and Labrador
Jed Brundidge	(United States) St. Paul, Minnesota
Cameron Bryce	Stirling, Scotland
Aleksandr Bystrov	Saint Petersburg, Russia
Braden Calvert	Winnipeg, Manitoba
Jason Camm	Ottawa, Ontario
Cao Pengpeng	Beijing, China
Denis Cordick	Georgetown, Ontario
Miles Craig	Kerry Park, British Columbia
Warren Cross	Edmonton, Alberta
Chad Dahlseide	Calgary, Alberta
Neil Dangerfield	Victoria, British Columbia
Peter de Cruz	Geneva, Switzerland
Robert Desjardins	Saguenay, Quebec
Ty Dilello	Winnipeg, Manitoba
Scott Dunnam	(United States) Philadelphia, Pennsylvania
Matt Dunstone	Regina, Saskatchewan
Cole Ector	Edmonton, Alberta
Niklas Edin	Karlstad, Sweden
John Epping	Toronto, Ontario
Rod Feltham	Gander, Newfoundland and Labrador
Mark Fenner	(United States) Chaska, Minnesota
Martin Ferland	Trois-Rivières, Quebec
Pat Ferris	Grimsby, Ontario
Michael Fournier	Montreal, Quebec
Nik Geller	(United States) Columbus, Ohio
Simon Gempeler	Adelboden, Switzerland
Michael Glessner	(United States) Philadelphia, Pennsylvania
Sergei Glukhov	Sochi, Russia
Dale Goehring	Calgary, Alberta
Cameron Goodkey	Ottawa, Ontario
Jason Gunnlaugson	Winnipeg, Manitoba
Brad Gushue	St. John's, Newfoundland and Labrador
Benj Guzman	(United States) Wayland, Massachusetts
Matthew Hall	Kitchener, Ontario
Kalem Hamilton	Edmonton, Alberta
Rylan Hartley	Brantford, Ontario
Kody Hartung	Langenburg, Saskatchewan
Jeremy Harty	Calgary, Alberta
Cory Heggestad	Stroud, Ontario
Jan Hess	Zug, Switzerland
Justin Hewitt	St. John's, Newfoundland and Labrador
Marco Hoesli	Glarus, Switzerland
Steve Holdaway	Montreal, Quebec
Jacob Horgan	Sudbury, Ontario
Tanner Horgan	Winnipeg Beach, Manitoba
Glenn Howard	Penetanguishene, Ontario
Steven Howard	Regina, Saskatchewan
Stephen Imes	(United States) Columbus, Ohio
Brad Jacobs	Sault Ste. Marie, Ontario
Ryan Jacques	Edmonton, Alberta
Scott Jones	Moncton, New Brunswick
Kei Kamada	Sapporo, Japan
Junpei Kanda	Tokyo, Japan
Kang Xinlong	Changchun, China
Kagetora Kawahira	Karuizawa, Japan
Mark Kean	London, Ontario
Glen Kennedy	Edmonton, Alberta
Kim Chang-min	Uiseong, South Korea
Kim Soo-hyuk	Seoul, South Korea
Jan Klossner	Langenthal, Switzerland
Kevin Koe	Calgary, Alberta
Nobukazu Komoribayashi	Morioka, Japan
Warren Kozak	Calgary, Alberta
Richard Krell	Kitchener-Waterloo, Ontario
Robert Kwan	Nutmeg, United States
Jacob Libbus	Edmonton, Alberta
Lucien Lottenbach	Zug, Switzerland
Brent MacDougall	Halifax, Nova Scotia
Sandy MacEwan	Sudbury, Ontario
Dominik Märki	(United States) Chaska, Minnesota
Daniel Magnusson	Karlstad, Sweden
Matthew Manuel	Halifax, Nova Scotia
Yuta Matsumura	Karuizawa, Japan
Scott McDonald	Kingston, Ontario
Mike McEwen	Winnipeg, Manitoba
Shaun Meachem	Saskatoon, Saskatchewan
Chris Medford	Cranbrook, British Columbia
Paul Moffatt	Waterloo, Ontario
Nathan Molberg	St. Albert, Alberta
Sam Mooibroek	Cambridge, Ontario
Yusuke Morozumi	Karuizawa, Japan
Bruce Mouat	Edinburgh, Scotland
Jamie Murphy	Halifax, Nova Scotia
Marc Muskatewitz	Füssen, Germany
Kirk Muyres	Saskatoon, Saskatchewan
Craig Nicko	(United States) Blaine, Minnesota
Mark Noseworthy	St. John's, Newfoundland and Labrador
Fredrik Nyman	Stockholm, Sweden
Sean O'Connor	Calgary, Alberta
Ryo Ogihara	Karuizawa, Japan
Kevin Ouellette	Halifax, Nova Scotia
James Pahl	Edmonton, Alberta
Park Jong-duk	Gangwon, South Korea
Ross Paterson	Glasgow, Scotland
Magnus Ramsfjell	Trondheim, Norway
Andrew Reed	Cambridge, England
Rob Retchless	Tunbridge Wells, England
Joël Retornaz	Pinerolo, Italy
Jeff Richard	Kelowna, British Columbia
Luca Rizzolli	Cembra, Italy
Steven Rotskas	Toronto, Ontario
Rick Rowsell	St. John's, Newfoundland and Labrador
Jean-Sébastien Roy	Saguenay, Quebec
Rich Ruohonen	(United States) Minneapolis, Minnesota
Kyosuke Sawaguchi	Morioka, Japan
Andrin Schnider	St. Gallen, Switzerland
Yannick Schwaller	Bern, Switzerland
Edward Scimia	(United States) Bridgeport, Connecticut
Thomas Scoffin	Whitehorse, Yukon
Daiki Shikano	Kitami, Japan
John Shuster	(United States) Duluth, Minnesota
Chase Sinnett	(United States) Blaine, Minnesota
Trent Skanes	St. John's, Newfoundland and Labrador
Aaron Sluchinski	Airdrie, Alberta
Greg Smith	St. John's, Newfoundland and Labrador
Jason Smith	(United States) Blaine, Minnesota
Riley Smith	Winnipeg, Manitoba
Darryl Sobering	(United States) Denver, Colorado
Shea Steele	Halifax, Nova Scotia
Sam Steep	St. Catharines, Ontario
Chad Stevens	Truro, Nova Scotia
Tyler Stewart	Waterloo, Ontario
Yves Stocker	Bern, Switzerland
Karsten Sturmay	Edmonton, Alberta
Andrew Symonds	St. John's, Newfoundland and Labrador
Naomasa Takeda	Sapporo, Japan
Tyler Tardi	Surrey, British Columbia
Colin Thomas	St. John's, Newfoundland and Labrador
Kendal Thompson	Halifax, Nova Scotia
Stuart Thompson	Dartmouth, Nova Scotia
Tian Jiafeng	Changchun, China
Brandon Tippin	Elmvale, Ontario
Noé Traub	Basel, Switzerland
Suguru Tsukamoto	Kanagawa, Japan
Wayne Tuck Jr.	Brantford, Ontario
Kevin Tuma	(United States) St. Paul, Minnesota
Kevin Tym	Edmonton, Alberta
Thomas Ulsrud	Oppdal, Norway
Evan van Amsterdam	Edmonton, Alberta
Jaap van Dorp	Zoetermeer, Netherlands
Daylan Vavrek	Sexsmith, Alberta
Luc Violette	(United States) Chaska, Minnesota
Yves Wagenseil	Bern, Switzerland
Scott Webb	Peace River, Alberta
Daniel Wenzek	New Westminster, British Columbia
Ross Whyte	Stirling, Scotland
John Willsey	Waterloo, Ontario
Sebastian Wunderer	Kitzbühel, Austria
Tsuyoshi Yamaguchi	Karuizawa, Japan
Nathan Young	St. John's, Newfoundland and Labrador
Zhang Li-kun	Beijing, China
Zou Qiang	Beijing, China

== Women ==
As of March 15, 2020

Skip	Locale
Skylar Ackerman	Saskatoon, Saskatchewan
Abby Ackland	Winnipeg, Manitoba
Mubarkah Al-Abdulla	Doha, Qatar
Layla Al-Saffar	Forfar, Scotland
Sitora Alliyarova	Almaty, Kazakhstan
Aroa Amilibia	Val d'Aran, Spain
Emily Anderson	(United States) Broomall, Pennsylvania
Hanna Anderson	Regina, Saskatchewan
Sherry Anderson	Saskatoon, Saskatchewan
Shinobu Aota	Aomori, Japan
Lorraine Arguin	Moose Jaw, Saskatchewan
Mary-Anne Arsenault	Halifax, Nova Scotia
Marianne Aspelin	Snarøya, Norway
Cathy Auld	Kingston, Ontario
Anastasia Babarykina	Saint Petersburg, Russia
Tyanna Bain	Inuvik, Northwest Territories
Glenys Bakker	Edmonton, Alberta
Ryleigh Bakker	Calgary, Alberta
Megan Balsdon	Woodstock, Ontario
Brett Barber	Biggar, Saskatchewan
Penny Barker	Moose Jaw, Saskatchewan
Evelīna Barone	Riga, Latvia
Lauren Barron	St. John's, Newfoundland and Labrador
Nadine Bärtschiger	Wallisellen, Switzerland
Madison Bear	(United States) St. Paul, Minnesota
Grace Beaudry	Winnipeg, Manitoba
Hailey Beaudry	Thunder Bay, Ontario
Victoria Beaudry	Winnipeg, Manitoba
Hayley Bergman	Morris, Manitoba
Teryn Berlando	Calgary, Alberta
Cheryl Bernard	Calgary, Alberta
Veronica Bernard	St. Catharines, Ontario
Hailey Birnie	Whitehorse, Yukon
Suzanne Birt	Charlottetown, Prince Edward Island
Jade Bloor	Weyburn, Saskatchewan
Camille Boisvert	Lévis, Quebec
Emily Bowles	British Columbia
Chelsea Brandwood	Listowel, Ontario
Theresa Breen	Halifax, Nova Scotia
Brittany Brezinski	Edmonton, Alberta
Jennifer Briscoe	Thompson, Manitoba
Maureen Broder	Ottawa, Ontario
Jill Brothers	Halifax, Nova Scotia
Corryn Brown	Kamloops, British Columbia
Melinda Brown	Fredericton, New Brunswick
Kira Brunton	Sudbury, Ontario
Amy Bryce	Stirling, Scotland
Kalia Buchy	Kimberley, British Columbia
Krysta Burns	Sudbury, Ontario
Chrissy Cadorin	St. Thomas, Ontario
Adriana Camarena Osorno	Mexico City, Mexico
Theresa Cannon	Winnipeg, Manitoba
Chelsea Carey	Calgary, Alberta
Emily Clark	Westlock, Alberta
Jennifer Clark-Rouire	Miami, Manitoba
Brenna Cochrane	Toronto, Ontario
Mariah Coloumbe	Victoria, British Columbia
Justine Comeau	Fredericton, New Brunswick
Sandy Comeau	Moncton, New Brunswick
Karen Cousins	Saint John, New Brunswick
Andrea Crawford	Oromocto, New Brunswick
DaKotah Crotty	(United States) Pardeeville, Wisconsin
Bella Croisier	Sudbury, Ontario
Elysa Crough	Edmonton, Alberta
Erica Curtis	St. John's, Newfoundland and Labrador
Rachael Dakers	Edinburgh, Scotland
Camille Daly	Sudbury, Ontario
Sarah Daniels	Delta, British Columbia
Kristine Wedum Davanger	Stabekk, Norway
Lisa Davie	Stirling, Scotland
Arah Davies	Winnipeg, Manitoba
Lisa Davies	Montreal, Quebec
Mary Day	Halifax, Nova Scotia
Betti Delorey	Hay River, Northwest Territories
Abby Deschene	Sudbury, Ontario
Emily Deschenes	Manotick, Ontario
Tammy Dewar	Montague, Prince Edward Island
Amelia Dolsen	London, Ontario
Norma Douglass	Brooks, Alberta
Susan Dudt	(United States) Malvern, Pennsylvania
Hollie Duncan	Toronto, Ontario
Wendy Dunne	St. John's, Newfoundland and Labrador
Marharyta Dziashuk	Minsk, Belarus
Morgayne Eby	Vernon, British Columbia
Lori Eddy	Iqaluit, Nunavut
Kerri Einarson	Gimli, Manitoba
Sheena Engel	Okotoks, Alberta
Krystal Englot	Regina, Saskatchewan
Michelle Englot	Regina, Saskatchewan
Beth Farmer	Kinross, Scotland
Lisa Farnell	Kent, England
Cora Farrell	(United States) Chaska, Minnesota
Hannah Farries	Dumfries, Scotland
Mary Fay	Kingston, Ontario
Binia Feltscher	Langenthal, Switzerland
Lauren Ferguson	Cornwall, Prince Edward Island
Kara Findlay	Edinburgh, Scotland
Krista Flanagan	Halifax, Nova Scotia
Shalon Fleming	Regina, Saskatchewan
Sarah Fletcher	Ottawa, Ontario
Tracy Fleury	East St. Paul, Manitoba
Melodie Forsythe	Moncton, New Brunswick
Cecilia Fransson	Skellefteå, Sweden
Alexandra Friesen	Winnipeg, Manitoba
Susan Froud	Stroud, Ontario
Miyako Fujisaki	Morioka, Japan
Satsuki Fujisawa	Kitami, Japan
Shiori Fujisawa	Karuizawa, Japan
Kerry Galusha	Yellowknife, Northwest Territories
Alba Garcia	Barcelona, Spain
Irantzu Garcia	Vitoria-Gasteiz, Spain
Hetty Garnier	London, England
Noémie Gauthier	Jonquière, Quebec
Amanda Gebhardt	New Liskeard, Ontario
Gim Un-chi	Gyeonggido, South Korea
Marianne Girard	Sainte-Foy, Quebec
Mackenzie Glynn	St. John's, Newfoundland and Labrador
Judy Goucher	Hay River, Northwest Territories
Shelly Graham	Fredericton, New Brunswick
Serena Gray-Withers	Stonewall, Manitoba
Guo Yanan	Neimenggu, China
Diane Gushulak	Vancouver, British Columbia
Kayte Gyles	New Westminster, British Columbia
Makenna Hadway	Dauphin, Manitoba
Caroline Hains	Val-d'Or, Quebec
Lisa Hale	Dauphin, Manitoba
Nilla Hallström	Härnösand, Sweden
Mathilde Halse	Hvidovre, Denmark
Leslie Hammond	Edmonton, Alberta
Han Siyu	Changchun, China
Han Yu	Beijing, China
Mizuki Hara	Sapporo, Japan
Jacqueline Harrison	Dundas, Ontario
Jennifer Harvey	Cornwall, Ontario
Anna Hasselborg	Sundbyberg, Sweden
Julie Hastings	Stouffville, Ontario
Miki Hayashi	Sapporo, Japan
Heather Heggestad	Barrie, Ontario
Fay Henderson	Stirling, Scotland
Krysta Hilker	Edmonton, Alberta
Tanya Hilliard	Halifax, Nova Scotia
Amber Holland	Regina, Saskatchewan
Rachel Homan	Ottawa, Ontario
Erica Hopson	Ottawa, Ontario
Lauren Horton	Waterloo, Ontario
Ashley Howard	Saskatoon, Saskatchewan
Lindsay Hudyma	Vancouver, British Columbia
Corrie Hürlimann	Zug, Switzerland
Ling-Yue Hung	Hong Kong, Hong Kong
Danielle Inglis	Mississauga, Ontario
Anya Jackson	Dauphin, Manitoba
Sophie Jackson	Dumfries, Scotland
Virginia Jackson	Dartmouth, Nova Scotia
Holly Jamieson	Edmonton, Alberta
Melanie Jefferson	Sault Ste. Marie, Ontario
Daniela Jentsch	Füssen, Germany
Jiang Yilun	Beijing, China
Jennalee Johnson	(United States) Minneapolis, Minnesota
Laura Johnston	North Bay, Ontario
Colleen Jones	Halifax, Nova Scotia
Jennifer Jones	Winnipeg, Manitoba
Kaitlyn Jones	Toronto, Ontario
Samantha Jones	(United States) Endeavor, Wisconsin
Linda Joó	Budapest, Hungary
Sherry Just	Saskatoon, Saskatchewan
Gabriela Kajanová	Bratislava, Slovakia
Minori Kakuhara	Obihiro, Japan
Ashley Kalk	Edmonton, Alberta
Asuka Kanai	Nagano, Japan
Sari Kanbayashi	Kitami, Japan
Yumiko Kashiwagi	Karuizawa, Japan
Nicky Kaufman	Edmonton, Alberta
Misako Kawahira	Obihiro, Japan
Motoko Kawahira	Obihiro, Japan
Susan Kelsey	Edinburgh, Scotland
Adele Kezama	Sherwood Park, Alberta
Mackenzie Kiemele	Kitchener-Waterloo, Ontario
Kim Eun-jung	Uiseong, South Korea
Kim Min-ji	Chuncheon, South Korea
Abbey Kitchens	(United States) Devils Lake, North Dakota
Tori Koana	Yamanashi, Japan
Alina Kovaleva	Saint Petersburg, Russia
Anna Kubešková	Prague, Czech Republic
Isabelle Ladouceur	Waterloo, Ontario
Maria Larsson	Östersund, Sweden
Gabrielle Lavoie	Lévis, Quebec
Lynn Lee	Medicine Hat, Alberta
Sharon Levesque	Moncton, New Brunswick
Kaja Liik-Tamm	Tallinn, Estonia
Heidi Lin	Taipei, Chinese Taipei
Marie-Elaine Little	Ottawa, Ontario
Katy Lukowich	East St. Paul, Manitoba
Amy MacDonald	Stirling, Scotland
Triin Madisson	Tallinn, Estonia
Colleen Madonia	Thornhill, Ontario
Sarah Mallais	Moncton, New Brunswick
Diana Margarian	Saint Petersburg, Russia
Abby Marks	Edmonton, Alberta
Kirsten Marshall	Waterloo, Ontario
Tana Martin	Hay River, Northwest Territories
Mary Mattatall	Halifax, Nova Scotia
Hallie McCannell	Brandon, Manitoba
Krista McCarville	Thunder Bay, Ontario
Deb McCreanor	Winnipeg, Manitoba
Kristy McDonald	Winnipeg, Manitoba
Julie McEvoy	Halifax, Nova Scotia
Christine McMakin	(United States) St. Paul, Minnesota
Mei Jie	Beijing, China
Eirin Mesloe	Oslo, Norway
Sherry Middaugh	Toronto, Ontario
Mayu Minami	Sapporo, Japan
Jessica Mitchell	Saskatoon, Saskatchewan
Mackenzie Mitchell	St. John's, Newfoundland and Labrador
Emma Moberg	Mjölby, Sweden
Fabienne Mollet	Biel, Switzerland
Cally Moore	Lower Sackville, Nova Scotia
Melissa Morrow	Summerside, Prince Edward Island
Sarah Müller	Biel, Switzerland
Eve Muirhead	Stirling, Scotland
Morgan Muise	Calgary, Alberta
Jestyn Murphy	Mississauga, Ontario
Mary Myketyn-Driscoll	Halifax, Nova Scotia
Michala Nadherova	Prague, Czech Republic
Seina Nakajima	Nagano, Japan
Anya Normandeau	(United States) Burnsville, Minnesota
Oh Eun-jin	Jeonbuk, South Korea
Brooklyn Onagi	Winnipeg, Manitoba
Elaine Osnachenko	Saskatchewan
Nora Østgård	Trondheim, Norway
Oihane Otaegi	San Sebastián, Spain
Dorottya Palancsa	Budapest, Hungary
Park Yoo-bin	Seoul, South Korea
Virginija Paulauskaitė	Vilnius, Lithuania
Zuzana Paulová	Prague, Czech Republic
Beth Peterson	Winnipeg, Manitoba
Tabitha Peterson	(United States) St. Paul, Minnesota
Dailene Pewarchuk	Victoria, British Columbia
Tanya Phillips	Halifax, Nova Scotia
Melissa Pierce	Edmonton, Alberta
Colleen Pinkney	Truro, Nova Scotia
Sadie Pinksen	Iqaluit, Nunavut
Marta Pluta	Gliwice, Poland
Knesia Pikalova	Kaliningrad, Russia
Layna Pohlod	Delta, British Columbia
Berivan Polat	Erzurum, Turkey
Cassie Potter	(United States) St. Paul, Minnesota
Kelsey Powell	Vernon, British Columbia
Amanda Power	Charlottetown, Prince Edward Island
Sylvie Quillian	Moncton, New Brunswick
Rhiley Quinn	Calgary, Alberta
Maia Ramsfjell	Lillehammer, Norway
Martina Reuteler	Bern, Switzerland
Kim Rhyme	(United States) Minneapolis, Minnesota
Brette Richards	Kelowna, British Columbia
Fabienne Rieder	Bern, Switzerland
Darcy Robertson	Winnipeg, Manitoba
Kelsey Rocque	Edmonton, Alberta
Marianne Rørvik	Oslo, Norway
Judy Ross	Moncton, New Brunswick
Breanna Rozon	Ottawa, Ontario
Ieva Rudzīte	Riga, Latvia
Oihane Ruiz	Vitoria-Gasteiz, Spain
Vlada Rumiantseva	Moscow, Russia
Jessica Rutter	Winnipeg, Manitoba
Kristen Ryan	Maple Ridge, British Columbia
Sarina Ryser	Grindelwald, Switzerland
Presley Sagert	Swan River, Manitoba
Honoka Sasaki	Sapporo, Japan
Tomomi Sato	Miyagi, Japan
Casey Scheidegger	Lethbridge, Alberta
Michelle Schlachter	Bern, Switzerland
Lorraine Schneider	Regina, Saskatchewan
Andrea Schöpp	Füssen, Germany
Irene Schori	Limmattal, Switzerland
Xenia Schwaller	Baden, Switzerland
Bayly Scoffin	Whitehorse, Yukon
Holly Scott	Edmonton, Alberta
Jennifer Scott	Edmonton, Alberta
Julie Selvais	Lacombe, Alberta
Mandy Selzer	Regina, Saskatchewan
Stephanie Senneker	(United States) Kalamazoo, Michigan
Kelli Sharpe	St. John's, Newfoundland and Labrador
Marla Sherrer	Lacombe, Alberta
Yuki Shibuto	Hiroshima, Japan
Anne Shibuya	São Paulo, Brazil
Shin Eun-jin	Jeonju, South Korea
Anna Sidorova	Moscow, Russia
Robyn Silvernagle	North Battleford, Saskatchewan
Ashton Simard	Edmonton, Alberta
Jamie Sinclair	(United States) Charlotte, North Carolina
Eli Skaslien	Oppdal, Norway
Kayla Skrlik	Calgary, Alberta
Kim Slattery	Vernon, British Columbia
Susie Smith	Greenock, Scotland
Veronica Smith	Charlottetown, Prince Edward Island
Laurie St-Georges	Montreal, Quebec
Elīza Stabulniece	Riga, Latvia
Iveta Staša-Šaršūne	Riga, Latvia
Rachel Steele	Port Perry, Ontario
Elena Stern	Brig-Glis, Switzerland
Tiffany Steuber	Spruce Grove, Alberta
Taylour Stevens	Halifax, Nova Scotia
Kellie Stiksma	Edmonton, Alberta
Cassandrs Stobbe	Winnipeg, Manitoba
Ellen Storvik	Oslo, Norway
Kristen Streifel	Swift Current, Saskatchewan
Sarah Stroeder	Yellowknife, Northwest Territories
Heather Strong	St. John's, Newfoundland and Labrador
Kaitlin Stubbs	Calgary, Alberta
Selena Sturmay	Edmonton, Alberta
Milja Hellsten	Hyvinkää, Finland
Tova Sundberg	Östersund, Sweden
Emma Suter	Lausanne, Switzerland
Sierra Sutherland	Ottawa, Ontario
Minori Suzuki	Karuizawa, Japan
Yuri Suzuki	Obihiro, Japan
Natalia Sverzhinskaya	Minsk, Belarus
Momoha Tabata	Sapporo, Japan
Sena Tamura	Morioka, Japan
Misaki Tanaka	Aomori, Japan
Ekaterina Telnova	Moscow, Russia
Hannah Terry	Camrose, Alberta
Subasthika Thangadurai	Calgary, Alberta
Ashley Thevenot	Saskatoon, Saskatchewan
Kyla Thies	Regina, Saskatchewan
Karla Thompson	Kamloops, British Columbia
Julie Tippin	Montreal, Quebec
Silvana Tirinzoni	Aarau, Switzerland
Jana Tisdale	Saskatoon, Saskatchewan
Talyia Tober	Winnipeg, Manitoba
Ami Tonozaki	Sapporo, Japan
Nerea Torralba	Pyrenees, Spain
Ariel Traxler	(United States) Fairbanks, Alaska
Risa Tsuijmura	Sapporo, Japan
Kim Tuck	Wingham, Ontario
Marie Turmann	Tallinn, Estonia
Miia Turto	Harjavalta, Finland
Morgan Typhair	Oshawa, Ontario
Terry Ursel	Neepawa, Manitoba
Janelle Vachon	Brandon, Manitoba
Asta Vaičekonytė	Lithuania
Jodi Vaughan	Calgary, Alberta
Noémie Verreault	Chicoutimi, Quebec
Hollie Vincent	Red Deer, Alberta
Elina Virtaala	Hyvinkää, Finland
Eva Vollan	Lillehammer, Norway
Lauren Wagner	Melbourne, Australia
Laura Walker	Edmonton, Alberta
Meghan Walter	Winnipeg, Manitoba
Wang Chenyi	Beijing, China
Wang Meini	Changchun, China
Sarah Wark	Abbotsford, British Columbia
Maddy Warriner	Listowel, Ontario
Katelyn Wasylkiw	Toronto, Ontario
Kristy Watling	Winnipeg, Manitoba
Rebecca Wichers-Schreur	Ottawa, Ontario
Ellaine Wilhelm	Adelboden, Switzerland
Rae Ann Williamson	Regina, Saskatchewan
Maggie Wilson	Stirling, Scotland
Selina Witschonke	Lucerne, Switzerland
Katrine Nygård Wolla	Hedmarken, Norway
Kim Woods	Metcalfe, Ontario
Rachel Workin	(United States) Fargo, North Dakota
Isabella Wranå	Sundbyberg, Sweden
Nora Wüest	Wetzikon, Switzerland
Jessica Wytrychowski	Airdrie, Alberta
Yan Mayun	Beijing, China
Dilşat Yıldız	Erzurum, Turkey
Sayaka Yoshimura	Sapporo, Japan
Mackenzie Zacharias	Altona, Manitoba
Veronica Zappone	Pinerolo, Italy
Nola Zingel	Lloydminster, Alberta

== Mixed doubles ==
As of October 7, 2019

Team	Locale
Alexandra Agre/Derrick McLean	(United States) Chaska, Minnesota
Gina Aitken/Scott Andrews	Stirling, Scotland
Sarah Anderson/Korey Dropkin	(United States) Minneapolis, Minnesota
Taylor Anderson/Hunter Clawson	(United States) Minneapolis, Minnesota
Madison Bear/Andrew Stopera	(United States) Chaska, Minnesota
Lyndsey Berlett/Scott Dow	Palmerston, Ontario
Shannon Birchard/Catlin Schneider	Winnipeg, Manitoba
Erin Britnell/Philip Marlow	Brampton, Ontario
Kira Brunton/John Morris	Canmore, Alberta
Jolene Campbell/John Morris	Canmore, Alberta
Cao Chang/Yuan Mingjie	Beijing, China
Cory Christensen/John Shuster	(United States) Duluth, Minnesota
Cristin Clark/Chris Bond	(United States) Seattle, Washington
Katie Cottrill/Shawn Cottrill	Belgrave, Ontario
Jacqueline Cowan/Loris Elliott	Sault Ste. Marie, Ontario
Misako Den/Naofumi Den	Nagano, Japan
Émilie Desjardins/Robert Desjardins	Chicoutimi, Quebec
Mika Fish/Barry Fish	(United States) Denver, Colorado
Allison Flaxey/Patrick Janssen	Pickering, Ontario
Audrey Foote/Blake Hagberg	(United States) Utica, New York
Mandy Gebhardt/Andrew Fairfull	Guelph, Ontario
Tahli Gill/Dean Hewitt	Brisbane, Australia
Em Good/MacAllan Guy	(United States) Seattle, Washington
Clancy Grandy/Patrick Janssen	Toronto, Ontario
Sheri Greenman/Michael Zuliani	Unionville, Ontario
Becca Hamilton/Matt Hamilton	(United States) McFarland, Wisconsin
Anna Hasselborg/Oskar Eriksson	Sundbyberg, Sweden
Heather Heggestad/Cory Heggestad	Stroud, Ontario
Johanna Heldin/Kristian Lindström	Stockholm, Sweden
Grace Holyoke/Connor Lawes	Toronto, Ontario
Ling-Yue Hung/Jason Chang	Hong Kong, Hong Kong
Farzana Hussain/Rayad Husain	Georgetown, Guyana
Jang Hye-ji/Seong Yu-jin	Uiseong, South Korea
Shannon Jay/Chris Jay	London, Ontario
Eszter Juhasz/Markku Uusipaavalniemi	Hyvinkaa, Finland
Lindsay Kastrau/John Willsey	Waterloo, Ontario
Oona Kauste/Aku Kauste	Hyvinkaa, Finland
Michelle Laidlaw/Jerry Butler	Brampton, Ontario
Catherine Liscumb/Chris Liscumb	Ilderton, Ontario
Liu Sijia/Zou Dejia	Beijing, China
Taylor Longo/Greg Inglis	Belleville, Ontario
Kelly Luenenborg/Aaron Johnston	(United States) Denver, Colorado
Anna Maria Maurino/Fabrizio Gallo	Pinerolo, Italy
Tina Mazerolle/Andrew Mazerolle	Elora, Ontario
McKenna McGovern/Sam Steep	Forest, Ontario
Kirstin McKeown/Gabriel Nickel	(United States) Blaine, Minnesota
Christine McMakin/Riley Fenson	(United States) Bemidji, Minnesota
Clare Moores/Lance Wheeler	(United States) Denver, Colorado
Dorottya Palancsa/Zsolt Kiss	Budapest, Hungary
Zuzana Paulova/Tomas Paul	Prague, Czech Republic
Jenny Perret/Martin Rios	Bern, Switzerland
Vicky Persinger/Chris Plys	(United States) Chaska, Minnesota
Jocelyn Peterman/Brett Gallant	Winnipeg, Manitoba
Tabitha Peterson/Joe Polo	(United States) Chaska, Minnesota
Ann Podoll/Nathan Parry	(United States) Fargo, North Dakota
Anastasia Richards/Sammy Churchill	Burlington, Ontario
Jo-Ann Rizzo/Rylan Hartley	Brantford, Ontario
Carrie Robertson/Alex Robertson	St. Marys, Ontario
Angela Romei/Joel Retornaz	Pinerolo, Italy
Riley Sandham/Brendan Craig	Georgetown, Ontario
Bobbie Sauder/Brendan Bottcher	Spruce Grove, Alberta
Katja Schlegel/Sebastian Keiser	Zug, Switzerland
Courtney Shaw/Melvin Shaw	(United States) Washington, D.C.
Jessica Shipmaker/Mike Aprile	Newmarket, Ontario
Kristin Moen Skaslien/Magnus Nedregotten	Oppdal Municipality, Norway
Courtney Smith/Hamish Walker	Naseby, New Zealand
Jessica Smith/Ben Smith	Naseby, New Zealand
Renee Sobering/Darryl Sobering	(United States) Denver, Colorado
Song Yu-jin/Jeon Jae-ik	Uiseong, South Korea
Maureen Stolt/Peter Stolt	(United States) Plymouth, Minnesota
Sierra Sutherland/Thomas Ryn	Ottawa, Ontario
Shelby Sweet/Jordan Williams	(United States) Seattle, Washington
Holly Thompson/Anton Hood	Naseby, New Zealand
Stephanie Thompson/Matt Lowe	Unionville, Ontario
Kimberly Tuck/Wayne Tuck, Jr.	Ilderton, Ontario
Marie Turmann/Harri Lill	Tallinn, Estonia
Lauren Wasylkiw/Shane Konings	Unionville, Ontario
Erin Way/Jeremy Way	Courtice, Ontario
Jennifer Westhagen/Matt Panoussi	Melbourne, Australia
Nicole Westlund Stewart/Tyler Stewart	Ayr, Ontario
Therese Westman/Robin Ahlberg	Stockholm, Sweden
Becca Wood/Sean Franey	(United States) Denver, Colorado
