= Ice Gold Cup =

World Curling Tour event

- Established: 2018
- Host city: Obihiro, Japan
- Arena: Curlplex Obihiro
- Website: www.obihirocurling.com
- Men's purse: ¥ 500,000
- Women's purse: ¥ 950,000

Current champions (2024)
- Men: (Hokkaido) Toshiya Iida
- Women: (Hokkaido) Miku Nihira

The Ice Gold Cup is an annual tournament on the men's World Curling Tour. It is held annually in May at Curlplex Obihiro in Obihiro, Japan.

The purse for the event is ¥ 1,000,000. Its event classification is 200.

The event has been held since 2018, when it was held at the beginning of the season in September. It was added to the World Curling Tour in 2019. The 2021 and 2022 events were not on the tour. A women's event was added in 2024.

== Men's champions ==
Year	Winning team	Runner up team	Winner's share (¥)
2018	(Hokkaido) Kohsuke Hirata, Shingo Usui (skip), Daiki Shikano, Yoshiya Miura	(Tokyo) Akira Otsuka, Tomoya Watanabe (skip), Naoki Kaneko, Hiromasa Yamamoto	¥500,000
2019	(Hokkaido) Kohsuke Hirata, Shingo Usui (skip), Yoshiya Miura, Sota Jutori	(Hokkaido) Kantaro Kawano, Kazaki Matsuoka, Hiroki Hasegawa, Yusuke Yamashita	¥500,000
2021 (Note: 2020 event held in March 2021)	(Hokkaido) Kazuki Matsuoka, Kantarou Kohno, Sota Akiyama, Shun Takahashi	(Hokkaido) Kenji Takamatsu, Naomasa Takeda, Hiroshi Nisato, Yutaro Kasai, Tatsuya Yokota	
2022 (Note: 2021 event held in March 2022)	(Hokkaido) Souta Tsuruga, Takuto Ouchi, Haruto Ouchi, Naoki Kanazawa, Ryo Aoki	(Hokkaido) Shun Takahashi, Kazuki Matsuoka, Kantarou Kohno, Takuo Saokawa	
2023	(Hokkaido) Takumi Maeda, Asei Nakahara, Hiroki Maeda, Uryu Kamikawa	(Hokkaido) Fukuhiro Ohno, Terry Uyeda, Eito Nakagawa, Asami Ootake	¥300,000
2024	(Hokkaido) Toshiya Iida, Yuta Fuse, Akihito Inaba, Kento Nishida	(Hokkaido) Yusaku Shibatani, Toshiya Matsuda, Fukuhiro Ohno, Shun Sakai	¥500,000

== Women's champions ==
Year	Winning team	Runner up team	Winner's share (¥)
2024	(Hokkaido) Momoha Tabata (Fourth), Miku Nihira (Skip), Sae Yamamoto, Mikoto Nakajima	(Hokkaido) Wakaba Kawamura, Moeko Tanaka, Touko Kanaka, Hasebe Tsuneno	¥950,000
