= Westville Road, Nova Scotia =

Community in Nova Scotia, Canada

Coordinates: 45°34′30″N 62°41′17″W

Westville Road in Nova Scotia

Westville Road is an unincorporated community in the Canadian province of Nova Scotia, located in Pictou County. The nearest neighbouring community is Riverview, and the towns of Westville and Stellarton are each about 3 km away. The main road through the community, Westville Road, leads to the TransCanada Highway.
