= 2020 Players' Championship =

Grand Slam of Curling event

2020 Princess Auto Players' Championship
- Host city: Toronto, Ontario
- Arena: Mattamy Athletic Centre
- Dates: April 7–12 (cancelled)

The 2020 Princess Auto Players' Championship was scheduled to be held from April 7 to 12, at the Mattamy Athletic Centre in Toronto, Ontario. On March 12, 2020, the event was cancelled due to the COVID-19 pandemic. The event was cancelled before the teams were announced.
