= 2015–16 curling season =

- Sport: Curling

Seasons
- ← 2014–15 2016–17 →

The 2015–16 curling season began in August 2015 and ended in May 2016.

The season was marked by new innovations in curling broom technology that drastically changed how sweeping was done, leading to the "broomgate" scandal. It forced the major curling bodies to make new rules after the season to regulate and standardize curling brushes.

Note: In events with two genders, the men's tournament winners will be listed before the women's tournament winners.

== Curling Canada sanctioned events ==
This section lists events sanctioned by and/or conducted by Curling Canada (formerly the Canadian Curling Association). The following events in bold have been confirmed by Curling Canada as are part of the 2015–16 Season of Champions programme.

Event	Winning team	Runner-up team
Canadian Mixed Curling Championship; Toronto, Ontario, Nov. 8–15	Alberta	Saskatchewan
Travelers Curling Club Championship; Ottawa, Ontario, Nov. 23–28	Newfoundland and Labrador	Manitoba
Travelers Curling Club Championship; Ottawa, Ontario, Nov. 23–28	Prince Edward Island	Ontario
**Canada Cup**; Grande Prairie, Alberta, Dec. 2–6	(Alberta) Kevin Koe	(Manitoba) Mike McEwen
**Canada Cup**; Grande Prairie, Alberta, Dec. 2–6	(Ontario) Rachel Homan	(Alberta) Valerie Sweeting
**Continental Cup of Curling**; Paradise, Nevada, Jan. 14–17	(Canada) (United States) Team North America	(United Nations) Team World
**Canadian Junior Curling Championships**; Stratford, Ontario, Jan. 23 – 31	Manitoba	Northern Ontario
**Canadian Junior Curling Championships**; Stratford, Ontario, Jan. 23 – 31	Nova Scotia	British Columbia
**Tournament of Hearts**; Grande Prairie, Alberta, Feb. 20–28	Alberta	Northern Ontario
**Tim Hortons Brier**; Ottawa, Ontario, Mar. 5–13	Alberta	Newfoundland and Labrador
**World Women's Curling Championship**; Swift Current, Saskatchewan, Mar. 19–27	Switzerland	Japan
CIS/CCA University Curling Championships; Kelowna, British Columbia, Mar. 20–23	(Ontario) Wilfrid Laurier Golden Hawks	Alberta Golden Bears
CIS/CCA University Curling Championships; Kelowna, British Columbia, Mar. 20–23	Alberta Pandas	(British Columbia) Thompson Rivers WolfPack
CCAA Curling National Championships; London, Ontario, Mar. 23–26	(Ontario) Humber Hawks	(Ontario) Sault Cougars
CCAA Curling National Championships; London, Ontario, Mar. 23–26	(Ontario) Seneca Sting	(Ontario) Fanshawe Falcons
Canadian Senior Curling Championships; Digby, Nova Scotia, Mar. 28 – Apr. 2	Ontario	Manitoba
Canadian Senior Curling Championships; Digby, Nova Scotia, Mar. 28 – Apr. 2	Nova Scotia	Saskatchewan
Canadian Mixed Doubles Curling Trials; Saskatoon, Saskatchewan, Mar. 31 – Apr. 3	(Alberta) (Newfoundland and Labrador) Jocelyn Peterman/Brett Gallant	(Alberta) (Newfoundland and Labrador) Laura Crocker/Geoff Walker
Canadian Masters Curling Championships; Kentville/Wolfville, Nova Scotia, Apr. 4–10	Alberta	Ontario
Canadian Masters Curling Championships; Kentville/Wolfville, Nova Scotia, Apr. 4–10	Saskatchewan	Nova Scotia
Canadian Wheelchair Curling Championship; Regina, Saskatchewan, Apr. 4–10	Saskatchewan	Northern Ontario

== Other events ==
Note: Events that have not been placed on the CCA's list of sanctioned events are listed here. If an event is listed on the CCA's final list for the 2015–16 curling season, it will be moved up to the "CCA-sanctioned events" section.

Event	Winning team		Runner-up team
World Mixed Curling Championship; Bern, Switzerland, Sep. 12–19	Norway		Sweden
2015 European Curling Championships – Group C Champéry, Switzerland, Oct. 12–17	C	Slovenia	Slovakia
2015 European Curling Championships – Group C Champéry, Switzerland, Oct. 12–17	C	France	Slovakia
World Wheelchair Curling B-Championship; Lohja, Finland, Nov. 7–12	Norway		South Korea
Pacific-Asia Curling Championships; Almaty, Kazakhstan, Nov. 7–14	South Korea		Japan
Pacific-Asia Curling Championships; Almaty, Kazakhstan, Nov. 7–14	Japan		South Korea
European Curling Championships; Esbjerg, Denmark, Nov. 20–28	A	Sweden	Switzerland
European Curling Championships; Esbjerg, Denmark, Nov. 20–28	A	Russia	Scotland
European Curling Championships; Esbjerg, Denmark, Nov. 20–28	B	Denmark	Austria
European Curling Championships; Esbjerg, Denmark, Nov. 20–28	B	Italy	Czech Republic
World Junior B Curling Championships; Lohja, Finland, Jan. 3–10	Russia		Denmark
World Junior B Curling Championships; Lohja, Finland, Jan. 3–10	Russia		Japan
Pinty’s All-Star Curling Skins Game; Banff, Alberta, Jan. 8–10	Team Brad Jacobs		Team Brad Gushue
Pinty’s All-Star Curling Skins Game; Banff, Alberta, Jan. 8–10	Team Jennifer Jones		Team Valerie Sweeting
Winter Youth Olympics; Lillehammer, Norway, Feb. 12–21	MT	Canada	United States
Winter Youth Olympics; Lillehammer, Norway, Feb. 12–21	MD	Yako Matsuzawa (JPN); Philipp Hösli (SUI)	Han Yu (CHN); Ross Whyte (GBR)
World Wheelchair Curling Championship; Lucerne, Switzerland, Feb. 21–28	Russia		Norway
World Junior Curling Championships; Copenhagen, Denmark, Mar. 5–13	Scotland		United States
World Junior Curling Championships; Copenhagen, Denmark, Mar. 5–13	Canada		United States
World Men's Curling Championship; Basel, Switzerland, Apr. 2–10	Canada		Denmark
World Senior Curling Championships; Karlstad, Sweden, Apr. 16–23	Sweden		Canada
World Senior Curling Championships; Karlstad, Sweden, Apr. 16–23	Scotland		Germany
World Mixed Doubles Curling Championship; Karlstad, Sweden, Apr. 16–23	Russia		China
2016 European Curling Championships – Group C Ljubljana, Slovenia, Apr. 25 – May 1	C	Estonia	France
2016 European Curling Championships – Group C Ljubljana, Slovenia, Apr. 25 – May 1	C	Belarus	Lithuania

== World Curling Tour ==
Grand Slam events in bold.

See also List of teams on the 2015–16 World Curling Tour

=== Men's events ===
Week	Event	Winning skip	Runner-up skip
1	Uiseong International Curling Tour; Uiseong, South Korea, Aug. 21–23	(South Korea) Kim Soo-hyuk	(Newfoundland and Labrador) Brad Gushue
2	Baden Masters; Baden, Switzerland, Aug. 28–30	(Sweden) Niklas Edin	(Scotland) Tom Brewster
3	Stu Sells Oakville Tankard; Oakville, Ontario, Sep. 4–7	(Newfoundland and Labrador) Brad Gushue	(Manitoba) Reid Carruthers
4	**GSOC Tour Challenge**; Paradise, Newfoundland and Labrador, Sep. 8–13	(Alberta) Kevin Koe	(Newfoundland and Labrador) Brad Gushue
4	Oakville OCT Fall Classic; Oakville, Ontario, Sep. 10–13	(Ontario) Codey Maus	(Ontario) Pat Ferris
5	AMJ Campbell Shorty Jenkins Classic; Brockville, Ontario, Sep. 17–20	(Newfoundland and Labrador) Brad Gushue	(Ontario) Glenn Howard
5	HDF Insurance Shoot-Out; Edmonton, Alberta, Sep. 17–20	(Saskatchewan) Shaun Meachem	(Alberta) Brendan Bottcher
5	Cloverdale Cash Spiel; Surrey, British Columbia, Sep. 18–20	(British Columbia) Dean Joanisse	(British Columbia) Chase Martyn
6	Point Optical Curling Classic; Saskatoon, Saskatchewan, Sep. 25–28	(Manitoba) Mike McEwen	(Manitoba) Reid Carruthers
6	Mother Club Fall Curling Classic; Winnipeg, Manitoba, Sep. 24–27	(Manitoba) David Bohn	(Manitoba) Matt Dunstone
6	KW Fall Classic; Waterloo, Ontario, Sep. 24–27	(China) Liu Rui	(Ontario) Ian Dickie
6	Appleton Rum Cashspiel; Lower Sackville, Sep. 25-28	(Nova Scotia) Brent MacDougall	(Nova Scotia) Jamie Danbrook
6	Morioka Ice Rink Memorial Cup; Morioka, Japan, Sep. 21–23	(Japan) Junpei Kanda	(Japan) Hiroshi Fukui
7	Swiss Cup Basel; Basel, Switzerland, Oct. 1–4	(Newfoundland and Labrador) Brad Gushue	(Netherlands) Jaap van Dorp
7	Prestige Hotels & Resorts Curling Classic; Vernon, British Columbia, Oct. 2–5	(Alberta) Pat Simmons	(British Columbia) Dean Joanisse
7	Avonair Cash Spiel; Edmonton, Alberta, Oct. 2–4	(South Korea) Kim Soo-hyuk	(Alberta) Robert Collins
7	Sobeys Classic; New Glasgow, Nova Scotia, Oct. 1–4	(Nova Scotia) Jamie Murphy	(Nova Scotia) Shawn Adams
8	Direct Horizontal Drilling Fall Classic; Edmonton, Alberta, Oct. 9–12	(Alberta) Kevin Koe	(Alberta) Brendan Bottcher
8	StuSells Toronto Tankard; Toronto, Ontario, Oct. 9–12	(Manitoba) Mike McEwen	(Ontario) Glenn Howard
8	St. Paul Cash Spiel; St. Paul, Minnesota, Oct. 9–11	(United States) Todd Birr	(United States) Heath McCormick
8	Minebea Cup; Niigata, Japan, Oct. 10–12	(Japan) Arhito Kasahara	(Japan) Junpei Kanda
8	Bud Light Men's Cashspiel; Halifax, Nova Scotia, Oct. 9–12	(Nova Scotia) Stuart Thompson	(Nova Scotia) Jamie Danbrook
9	Canad Inns Prairie Classic; Portage la Prairie, Manitoba, Oct. 16–19	(Saskatchewan) Steve Laycock	(Alberta) Kevin Koe
9	Hub International Crown of Curling; Kamloops, British Columbia, Oct. 16–19	(British Columbia) Sean Geall	(British Columbia) Dean Joanisse
9	Stroud Sleeman Cash Spiel; Stroud, Ontario, Oct. 15–18	(Ontario) Codey Maus	(Denmark) Rasmus Stjerne
9	McKee Homes Fall Curling Classic; Airdrie, Alberta, Oct. 16–18	(Alberta) Aaron Sluchinski	(Alberta) Kevin Yablonski
9	Thompson Curling Challenge; Urdorf, Switzerland, Oct. 16–18	(Russia) Artur Ali	(Switzerland) Felix Attinger
10	Challenge Chateau Cartier de Gatineau; Gatineau, Quebec, Oct. 22–25	(Newfoundland and Labrador) Brad Gushue	(Ontario) Mark Bice
10	Curling Masters Champéry; Champéry, Switzerland, Oct. 22–25	(New Brunswick) James Grattan	(Switzerland) Reto Keller
10	Red Deer Curling Classic; Red Deer, Alberta, Oct. 23–25	(Alberta) Mick Lizmore	(Saskatchewan) Jason Ackerman
10	Bernick's Miller Lite Open; Bemidji, Minnesota, Oct. 23–25	(Manitoba) Matt Dunstone	(United States) Pete Fenson
10	Grande Prairie Cash Spiel; Grande Prairie, Alberta, Oct. 23–25	(Alberta) Tom Sallows	(Alberta) Kurt Balderston
11	**The Masters Grand Slam of Curling**; Truro, Nova Scotia, Oct. 27 – Nov. 1	(Manitoba) Mike McEwen	(British Columbia) Jim Cotter
11	Huron ReproGraphics Oil Heritage Classic; Sarnia, Ontario, Oct. 29 – Nov. 1	(United States) John Shuster	(Ontario) Mark Bice
11	Medicine Hat Charity Classic; Medicine Hat, Alberta, Oct. 31 – Nov. 2	(Saskatchewan) Shaun Meachem	(Saskatchewan) Randy Bryden
12	CookstownCash presented by Comco Canada Inc. Cookstown, Ontario, Nov. 5–8	(Switzerland) Peter de Cruz	(Ontario) Brent Ross
12	Original 16 WCT Bonspiel; Calgary, Alberta, Nov. 6–8	(Alberta) Charley Thomas	(Alberta) Thomas Scoffin
12	Edinburgh International; Edinburgh, Scotland, Nov. 6–8	(Scotland) Kyle Smith	(Netherlands) Jaap van Dorp
12	Fort St. John Cash Spiel; Fort St. John, British Columbia, Nov. 6–8	(Alberta) Kurt Balderston	(Alberta) Scott Webb
13	**The National**; Oshawa, Ontario, Nov. 11–15	(Newfoundland and Labrador) Brad Gushue	(Manitoba) Reid Carruthers
13	Westwood Inn Classic; Swan River, Manitoba, Nov. 13–16	(Saskatchewan) Jeff Hartung	(Manitoba) Alex Forrest
13	Bally Haly Cashspiel; St. John's, Newfoundland and Labrador, Nov. 13–15	(Newfoundland and Labrador) Rick Rowsell	(Newfoundland and Labrador) Stephen Trickett
14	DEKALB Superspiel; Morris, Manitoba, Nov. 19–23	(Manitoba) Reid Carruthers	(Alberta) Charley Thomas
14	Dave Jones Stanhope Simpson Mayflower Cashspiel; Halifax, Nova Scotia, Nov. 19–22	(Newfoundland and Labrador) Brad Gushue	(Switzerland) Sven Michel
15	Weatherford Curling Classic; Estevan, Saskatchewan, Nov. 27–30	(Saskatchewan) Josh Heidt	(Manitoba) William Lyburn
15	Challenge Casino de Charlevoix; Clermont, Quebec, Nov. 26–29	(Ontario) Greg Balsdon	(Quebec) Jean-Michel Ménard
15	Coors Light Cash Spiel; Duluth, Minnesota, Nov. 27–29	(United States) John Shuster	(United States) Brady Clark
15	Black Diamond / High River Cash; Black Diamond & High River, Alberta, Nov. 27–29	(Alberta) Kevin Park	(Alberta) Bob Genoway
15	The Sunova Spiel at East St. Paul; Winnipeg, Manitoba, Nov. 27–30	(Manitoba) Taylor McIntyre	(Manitoba) Daley Peters
15	Spitfire Arms Cash Spiel; Windsor, Nova Scotia, Nov. 27–29	(Nova Scotia) Stuart Thompson	(Nova Scotia) Nicholas Deagle
15	Dawson Creek Cash Spiel; Dawson Creek, British Columbia, Nov. 27–29	(Alberta) Kurt Balderston	(Alberta) Thomas Scoffin
16	Jim Sullivan Curling Classic; Saint John, New Brunswick, Dec. 4–6	(Nova Scotia) Jamie Murphy	(New Brunswick) Jason Vaughan
16	Canada Cup; Camrose, Alberta, Dec. 2–6	(Alberta) Kevin Koe	(Manitoba) Mike McEwen
17	**Canadian Open of Curling**; Yorkton, Saskatchewan, Dec. 8–13	(Ontario) John Epping	(Newfoundland and Labrador) Brad Gushue
17	Truro Cashspiel; Truro, Nova Scotia, Dec. 11–13	(Nova Scotia) Jamie Danbrook	(Nova Scotia) Jamie Murphy
18	Karuizawa International Curling Championship; Karuizawa, Japan, Dec. 17–20	(Scotland) David Murdoch	(Alberta) Pat Simmons
18	Curl Mesabi Classic; Eveleth, Minnesota, Dec. 18–20	(United States) John Shuster	(Ontario) Dylan Johnston
18	Dumfries Challenger Series; Dumfries, Scotland, Dec. 18–20	(Scotland) Bruce Mouat	(Scotland) Tom Brewster
20	U.S. Open of Curling; Blaine, Minnesota, Jan. 1–4	(Ontario) John Epping	(United States) Craig Brown
21	Mercure Perth Masters; Perth, Scotland, Jan. 7–10	(Alberta) Kevin Koe	(Norway) Thomas Ulsrud
21	Goldline Saskatchewan Players Championship; Humboldt, Saskatchewan, Jan. 8–10	(Saskatchewan) Bruce Korte	(Saskatchewan) Shaun Meachem
22	Red Square Classic; Moscow, Russia, Jan. 14–17	(Russia) Alexander Kirikov	(Switzerland) Sven Michel
23	German Masters; Hamburg, Germany, Jan. 21–24	(Scotland) David Murdoch	(South Korea) Kim Soo-hyuk
23	Ed Werenich Golden Wrench Classic; Tempe, Arizona, Jan. 22–24	(Alberta) Pat Simmons	(British Columbia) Jim Cotter
31	**Elite 10**; Victoria, British Columbia, Mar. 16–20	(Newfoundland and Labrador) Brad Gushue	(Manitoba) Reid Carruthers
32	Aberdeen International Curling Championship; Aberdeen, Scotland, Mar. 25-27	(Scotland) David Murdoch	(Scotland) Tom Brewster
35	**The Players' Championship**; Toronto, Ontario, Apr. 12–17	(Newfoundland and Labrador) Brad Gushue	(Ontario) Brad Jacobs
36	EURONICS European Masters; St. Gallen, Switzerland, Apr. 20-23	(Scotland) David Murdoch	(Sweden) Niklas Edin
37	**Champions Cup**; Sherwood Park, Alberta, Apr. 26 – May 1	(Manitoba) Reid Carruthers	(Ontario) John Epping

=== Women's events ===
Week	Event	Winning skip	Runner-up skip
1	Uiseong International Curling Tour; Uiseong, South Korea, Aug. 21–23	(South Korea) Kim Eun-jung	(Japan) Tori Koana
3	Stu Sells Oakville Tankard; Oakville, Ontario, Sep. 4–7	(Ontario) Rachel Homan	(Switzerland) Alina Pätz
4	**GSOC Tour Challenge**; Paradise, Newfoundland and Labrador, Sep. 8–13	(Switzerland) Silvana Tirinzoni	(Ontario) Rachel Homan
4	Oakville OCT Fall Classic; Oakville, Ontario, Sep. 10–13	(Ontario) Jacqueline Harrison	(Ontario) Mallory Kean
5	AMJ Campbell Shorty Jenkins Classic; Brockville, Ontario, Sep. 17–20	(South Korea) Kim Eun-jung	(Ontario) Allison Flaxey
5	HDF Insurance Shoot-Out; Edmonton, Alberta, Sep. 17–20	(Alberta) Valerie Sweeting	(Saskatchewan) Stefanie Lawton
5	Cloverdale Cash Spiel; Surrey, British Columbia, Sep. 18–20	(British Columbia) Diane Gushulak	(British Columbia) Patti Knezevic
6	Stockholm Ladies Cup; Stockholm, Sweden, Sep. 25–27	(Ontario) Rachel Homan	(Scotland) Eve Muirhead
6	KW Fall Classic; Waterloo, Ontario, Sep. 24–27	(Ontario) Allison Flaxey	(United States) Erika Brown
6	Appleton Rum Cashspiel; Lower Sackville, Sep. 25-28	(Nova Scotia) Theresa Breen	(New Brunswick) Shannon Tatlock
6	Mother Club Fall Curling Classic; Winnipeg, Manitoba, Sep. 24–27	(Manitoba) Michelle Montford	(Manitoba) Beth Peterson
6	Morioka Ice Rink Memorial Cup; Morioka, Japan, Sep. 21–23	(Japan) Mizuki Kitaguchi	(Japan) Tori Koana
7	Prestige Hotels & Resorts Curling Classic; Vernon, British Columbia, Oct. 2–5	(Saskatchewan) Stefanie Lawton	(Alberta) Chelsea Carey
7	Avonair Cash Spiel; Edmonton, Alberta, Oct. 2–4	(China) Mei Jie	(Japan) Rina Ida
7	Sobeys Classic; New Glasgow, Nova Scotia, Oct. 1–4	(Prince Edward Island) Suzanne Birt	(Nova Scotia) Colleen Pinkney
8	Curlers Corner Autumn Gold Curling Classic; Calgary, Alberta, Oct. 9–12	(Ontario) Rachel Homan	(Alberta) Chelsea Carey
8	Women's Masters Basel; Basel, Switzerland, Oct. 9–11	(Russia) Anna Sidorova	(Switzerland) Silvana Tirinzoni
8	St. Paul Cash Spiel; St. Paul, Minnesota, Oct. 9–11	(United States) Cory Christensen	(United States) Jamie Sinclair
8	New Scotland Clothing Ladies Cashspiel; Halifax, Nova Scotia, Oct. 9–12	(Nova Scotia) Mary Fay	(Nova Scotia) Mary Mattatall
9	Hub International Crown of Curling; Kamloops, British Columbia, Oct. 16–19	(South Korea) Gim Un-chi	(Japan) Satsuki Fujisawa
9	Atkins Curling Supplies Women's Classic; Winnipeg, Manitoba, Oct. 16–19	(Manitoba) Darcy Robertson	(Manitoba) Barb Spencer
9	Stroud Sleeman Cash Spiel; Stroud, Ontario, Oct. 15–18	(Ontario) Julie Tippin	(Ontario) Allison Flaxey
10	Canad Inns Women's Classic; Portage la Prairie, Manitoba, Oct. 22–25	(South Korea) Kim Eun-jung	(Manitoba) Jennifer Jones
10	Red Deer Curling Classic; Red Deer, Alberta, Oct. 23–25	(Alberta) Kelsey Rocque	(Switzerland) Alina Pätz
10	Lady Monctonian Invitational Spiel; Moncton, New Brunswick, Oct. 23–25	(Nova Scotia) Mary Mattatall	(Nova Scotia) Theresa Breen
10	Riga International Curling Challenge; Riga, Latvia, Oct. 23–25	(Russia) Evgeniya Demkina	(Sweden) Karin Rudström
11	**The Masters Grand Slam of Curling**; Truro, Nova Scotia, Oct. 27 – Nov. 1	(Ontario) Rachel Homan	(Alberta) Valerie Sweeting
11	Medicine Hat Charity Classic; Medicine Hat, Alberta, Oct. 30 – Nov. 2	(Alberta) Shannon Kleibrink	(Alberta) Casey Scheidegger
11	Gord Carroll Curling Classic; Whitby, Ontario, Oct. 30 – Nov. 1	(Ontario) Jacqueline Harrison	(Ontario) Mallory Kean
12	Colonial Square Ladies Classic; Saskatoon, Saskatchewan, Nov. 6–9	(Ontario) Krista McCarville	(Saskatchewan) Sherry Anderson
12	Royal LePage OVCA Women's Fall Classic; Kemptville, Ontario, Nov. 5–8	(Ontario) Jacqueline Harrison	(Switzerland) Silvana Tirinzoni
12	Coronation Business Group Classic; Maple Ridge, British Columbia, Nov. 6–9	(British Columbia) Diane Gushulak	(British Columbia) Sarah Wark
12	CookstownCash presented by Comco Canada Inc. Cookstown, Ontario, Nov. 5–8	(Ontario) Julie Tippin	(Sweden) Anna Hasselborg
13	**The National**; Oshawa, Ontario, Nov. 11–15	(Ontario) Rachel Homan	(Ontario) Tracy Fleury
13	International ZO Women's Tournament; Wetzikon, Switzerland, Nov. 13–15	(Switzerland) Binia Feltscher	(Russia) Anna Sidorova
13	Crestwood Ladies Fall Classic; Edmonton, Alberta, Nov. 13–15	(Alberta) Kristen Streifel	(Alberta) Nicky Kaufman
13	Bally Haly Cashspiel; St. John's, Newfoundland and Labrador, Nov. 13–15	(Newfoundland and Labrador) Heather Strong	(Newfoundland and Labrador) Shelley Nichols
14	DEKALB Superspiel; Morris, Manitoba, Nov. 19–23	(Manitoba) Jennifer Jones	(United States) Erika Brown
14	Dave Jones Northbridge Mayflower Cashspiel; Halifax, Nova Scotia, Nov. 19–22	(Nova Scotia) Jill Brothers	(Nova Scotia) Theresa Breen
15	Boundary Ford Curling Classic; Lloydminster, Alberta, Nov. 27–30	(Alberta) Casey Scheidegger	(Saskatchewan) Brett Barber
15	Molson Cash Spiel; Duluth, Minnesota, Nov. 27–29	(Ontario) Krista McCarville	(United States) Nina Roth
15	The Sunova Spiel at East St. Paul; Winnipeg, Manitoba, Nov. 27–30	(Manitoba) Jennifer Clark-Rouire	(Manitoba) Lisa Menard
15	Spitfire Arms Cash Spiel; Windsor, Nova Scotia, Nov. 27–29	(Nova Scotia) Theresa Breen	(Nova Scotia) Mary-Anne Arsenault
16	Jim Sullivan Curling Classic; Saint John, New Brunswick, Dec. 4–6	(New Brunswick) Melissa Adams	(New Brunswick) Heidi Hanlon
16	Canada Cup; Camrose, Alberta, Dec. 2–6	(Ontario) Rachel Homan	(Alberta) Valerie Sweeting
17	**Canadian Open of Curling**; Yorkton, Saskatchewan, Dec. 8–13	(Ontario) Rachel Homan	(Manitoba) Jennifer Jones
18	Karuizawa International Curling Championship; Karuizawa, Japan, Dec. 17–20	(Japan) Ayumi Ogasawara	(Japan) Satsuki Fujisawa
18	Curl Mesabi Classic; Eveleth, Minnesota, Dec. 18–20	(Ontario) Krista McCarville	(United States) Cory Christensen
18	Dumfries Challenger Series; Dumfries, Scotland, Dec. 18–20	(Scotland) Lauren Gray	(Switzerland) Isabelle Maillard
18	Yichun International Ladies; Yichun, China, Dec. 14–18	(Saskatchewan) Michelle Englot	(United States) Jamie Sinclair
20	US Open of Curling; Blaine, Minnesota, Jan. 1–4	(Ontario) Krista McCarville	(China) Liu Sijia
21	International Bernese Ladies Cup; Bern, Switzerland, Jan. 7–10	(Switzerland) Silvana Tirinzoni	(Sweden) Margaretha Sigfridsson
22	Glynhill Ladies International; Glasgow, Scotland, Jan. 14–17	(Switzerland) Silvana Tirinzoni	(Sweden) Margaretha Sigfridsson
30	CCT Uiseong Masters; Uiseong, South Korea, Mar. 4–11	(Alberta) Kelsey Rocque	(Switzerland) Silvana Tirinzoni
33	City of Perth Ladies International; Perth, Scotland, Apr. 1–3	(Scotland) Eve Muirhead	(Switzerland) Silvana Tirinzoni
35	**The Players' Championship**; Toronto, Ontario, Apr. 12–17	(Scotland) Eve Muirhead	(Manitoba) Jennifer Jones
36	EURONICS European Masters; St. Gallen, Switzerland, Apr. 20–23	(Switzerland) Binia Feltscher	(Scotland) Eve Muirhead
37	**Champions Cup**; Sherwood Park, Alberta, Apr. 26 – May 1	(Manitoba) Jennifer Jones	(Ontario) Rachel Homan

=== Mixed doubles events ===
Week	Event	Winning team	Runner-up team
14	Wall Grain Mixed Doubles Classic; Oshawa, Ontario, Nov. 13–17	(Manitoba) M. McEwen/D. McEwen	(Ontario) Epping/Weagle

== WCT Order of Merit rankings ==
Men

Final standings
#	Skip	Points
1	(Alberta) Kevin Koe	531.161
2	(Newfoundland and Labrador) Brad Gushue	527.644
3	(Manitoba) Mike McEwen	457.921
4	(Manitoba) Reid Carruthers	397.845
5	(Ontario) John Epping	369.167
6	(Ontario) Brad Jacobs	345.128
7	(Saskatchewan) Steve Laycock	324.013
8	(Scotland) David Murdoch	284.756
9	(Sweden) Niklas Edin	277.612
10	(Ontario) Glenn Howard	268.135

Women

Final standings
#	Skip	Points
1	(Ontario) Rachel Homan	583.709
2	(Manitoba) Jennifer Jones	425.937
3	(Switzerland) Silvana Tirinzoni	374.300
4	(Scotland) Eve Muirhead	348.921
5	(Alberta) Valerie Sweeting	347.274
6	(Russia) Anna Sidorova	310.260
7	(Alberta) Chelsea Carey	308.312
8	(Manitoba) Kerri Einarson	289.275
9	(Alberta) Kelsey Rocque	287.130
10	(Ontario) Tracy Fleury	239.879

== WCT Money List ==
Men

Final standings
#	Skip	$ (CAD)
1	(Newfoundland and Labrador) Brad Gushue	194,051
2	(Alberta) Kevin Koe	143,356
3	(Manitoba) Reid Carruthers	120,085
4	(Manitoba) Mike McEwen	119,613
5	(Ontario) John Epping	94,749
6	(Saskatchewan) Steve Laycock	81,085
7	(Scotland) David Murdoch	75,349
8	(Sweden) Niklas Edin	74,357
9	(Ontario) Brad Jacobs	66,900
10	(Ontario) Glenn Howard	47,000

Women

Final standings
#	Skip	$ (CAD)
1	(Ontario) Rachel Homan	183,754
2	(Switzerland) Silvana Tirinzoni	129,847
3	(Alberta) Kelsey Rocque	115,205
4	(Manitoba) Jennifer Jones	111,938
5	(Alberta) Valerie Sweeting	91,955
6	(Scotland) Eve Muirhead	72,995
7	(South Korea) Kim Eun-jung	61,617
8	(Manitoba) Kerri Einarson	52,850
9	(Ontario) Tracy Fleury	46,993
10	(Japan) Ayumi Ogasawara	45,061

== Curling Canada MA Cup ==
The MA Cup is awarded to the Curling Canada Member Association (MA) who has had the most success during the season in Curling Canada-sanctioned events. Events included the Canadian mixed championship, Travelers Curling Club Championship (added to the MA Cup for this season), men's and women's juniors championships, the Scotties, the Brier, the men's and women's senior championships and the national wheelchair championship. Points were awarded based on placement in each of the events, with the top association receiving 14 points and each association under receiving points in decrements of one point.

=== Standings ===
Final standings

Rank	Member Association	CMCC	TMCCC	TWCCC	CWJCC	CMJCC	Scotties	Brier	CWSCC	CMSCC	CWhCC	Total Pts.	Avg. Pts.
1	Alberta	14	5	12	10	10	15	15	12	9	11	113	11.3
2	Saskatchewan	13	8	10	7	9	9	10	13	8	14	101	10.1
3	Northern Ontario	12	9	11	6	13	14	13	3	6	13	100	10
4	Manitoba	5	13	3	11	14	12	12	6	13	9	98	9.8
4	Nova Scotia	10	11	5	14	6	11	3	14	12	12	98	9.8
6	Ontario	6	3	13	8	8	10	8	11	14	7	88	8.8
7	Quebec	9	12	7	9	11	8	9	8	5	8	86	8.6
8	British Columbia	4	7	9	13	12	5	5	4	11	10	80	8
9	Newfoundland and Labrador	3	14	6	4	5	6	14	9	7	6	74	7.4
10	New Brunswick	11	6	8	12	7	4	6	10	2	5	71	7.1
11	Prince Edward Island	2	4	14	5	4	7	4	7	10	N/A	57	6.33
12	Yukon	7	10	4	2	3	2	2	5	4	N/A	39	4.33
13	Northwest Territories	8	2	2	1	1	3	7	2	3	N/A	29	3.22
14	Nunavut	1	1	1	3	2	1	1	1	1	N/A	12	1.33

Preceded by 2014–15	2015–16 curling season August 2015 – May 2016	Succeeded by 2016–17
