= 2019 Canadian Senior Curling Championships =

2019 Everest Canadian Senior Curling Championships
- Host city: Chilliwack, British Columbia
- Arena: Chilliwack Curling and Community Centre
- Dates: March 22 to 28, 2019
- Men's winner: Saskatchewan
- Curling club: Nutana Curling Club, Saskatoon
- Skip: Bruce Korte
- Third: Darrell McKee
- Second: Kory Kohuch
- Lead: Rory Golanowski
- Finalist: Ontario (Bryan Cochrane)
- Women's winner: Saskatchewan
- Curling club: Nutana Curling Club, Saskatoon
- Skip: Sherry Anderson
- Third: Patty Hersikorn
- Second: Brenda Goertzen
- Lead: Anita Silvernagle
- Finalist: Ontario (Sherry Middaugh)

The 2019 Everest Canadian Senior Curling Championships, Canada's national 50+ curling championship was held March 22 to 28 at the Chilliwack Curling and Community Centre in Chilliwack, British Columbia. The winning teams were supposed to represent Canada at the 2020 World Senior Curling Championships, but it was cancelled due to the COVID-19 pandemic.

This was the first event to be held at the new Chilliwack Curling and Community Centre facility.

The men's event was headlined by defending champions Bryan Cochrane of Ontario and two-time world champion Al Hackner of Northern Ontario. The women's event was headlined by defending champions Sherry Anderson (and 2018 World Senior champion) of Saskatchewan, 2006 Olympic bronze medallist Glenys Bakker of Alberta and four-time Tournament of Hearts bronze medallist Sherry Middaugh of Ontario, who made her seniors debut.

== Men ==
=== Teams ===
The teams are listed as follows:

Province	Skip	Third	Second	Lead	Club(s)
Alberta	Wade White	Barry Chwedoruk	Dan Holowaychuk	George White	Lac La Biche Curling Club, Lac La Biche
British Columbia	Wes Craig	Steve Waatainen	Craig Burton	Keith Clarke	Nanaimo Curling Club, Nanaimo & Kerry Park Curling Club, Mill Bay
Manitoba	Dave Boehmer	Terry McRae	Tom Want	George Hacking	Petersfield Curling Club, Petersfield
New Brunswick	Wade Blanchard	Greg Hanlon	Jeff Freeze	Claude Moore	Thistle St. Andrews Curling Club, Saint John
Newfoundland and Labrador	Gary Oke	Michael Mullins	Blair Fradsham	Dennis Bruce	Corner Brook Curling Club, Corner Brook
Northern Ontario	Al Hackner	Frank Morissette	Bob Whalen	Gary Champagne	Fort William Curling Club, Thunder Bay
Northwest Territories	Glen Hudy	Brian Kelln	Franz Dziuba	Richard Klakowich	Yellowknife Curling Centre, Yellowknife
Nova Scotia	Brent MacDougall	Andrew Dauphinee	Martin Gavin	Terry Piper	Mayflower Curling Club, Halifax & Dartmouth Curling Club, Dartmouth
Nunavut	Peter Mackey	Greg Howard	Jeff Nadeau	Lloyd Kendall	Iqaluit Curling Club, Iqaluit
Ontario	Bryan Cochrane	Ian MacAulay	Morgan Currie	Ken Sullivan	Russell Curling Club, Russell
Prince Edward Island	Phil Gorveatt	Kevin Champion	Larry Richards	Mike Dillon	Charlottetown Curling Club, Charlottetown & Montague Curling Club, Montague
Quebec	François Roberge	Serge Reid	Maxime Elmaleh	Daniel Bédard	Club de curling Etchemin, Saint Romuald, Club de curling Kénogami, Jonquière & Club de curling Lacolle, Lacolle
Saskatchewan	Bruce Korte	Darrell McKee	Kory Kohuch	Rory Golanowski	Nutana Curling Club, Saskatoon
Yukon	Pat Paslawski	Terry Miller	Doug Hamilton	Don McPhee	Whitehorse Curling Club, Whitehorse

=== Round-robin standings ===
Final Round Robin Standings

Key
Teams to Championship Pool

Pool A	Skip	W	L
Saskatchewan	Bruce Korte	6	0
Northern Ontario	Al Hackner	4	2
British Columbia	Wes Craig	4	2
Ontario	Bryan Cochrane	3	3
Yukon	Pat Paslawski	2	4
Nunavut	Peter Mackey	2	4
New Brunswick	Wade Blanchard	0	6

Pool B	Skip	W	L
Alberta	Wade White	5	1
Manitoba	Dave Boehmer	4	2
Quebec	François Roberge	4	2
Nova Scotia	Brent MacDougall	3	3
Prince Edward Island	Phil Gorveatt	2	4
Newfoundland and Labrador	Gary Oke	2	4
Northwest Territories	Glen Hudy	1	5

=== Championship Pool Standings ===
Final Championship Pool Standings

Key
Teams to Playoffs

Province	Skip	W	L
Saskatchewan	Bruce Korte	10	0
Alberta	Wade White	7	3
Ontario	Bryan Cochrane	6	4
Manitoba	Dave Boehmer	6	4
Quebec	François Roberge	6	4
Northern Ontario	Al Hackner	5	5
British Columbia	Wes Craig	5	5
Nova Scotia	Brent MacDougall	4	6

=== Seeding Pool Standings ===
Final Seeding Pool Standings

Province	Skip	W	L
Yukon	Pat Paslawski	4	5
Prince Edward Island	Phil Gorveatt	4	5
Newfoundland and Labrador	Gary Oke	4	5
Northwest Territories	Glen Hudy	3	6
Nunavut	Peter Mackey	2	7
New Brunswick	Wade Blanchard	1	8

=== Playoffs ===
Semifinal
1	Saskatchewan	5
4	Manitoba	1
2	Alberta	3
3	Ontario	6

Final
1	Saskatchewan	8
3	Ontario	4

Bronze-medal game
4	Manitoba	3
2	Alberta	10

==== Semifinals ====
Thursday, March 28, 8:30

Sheet C	1	2	3	4	5	6	7	8	Final
Saskatchewan (Korte)	1	0	0	1	0	0	3	X	5
Manitoba (Boehmer)	0	0	0	0	0	1	0	X	1

Sheet F	1	2	3	4	5	6	7	8	Final
Alberta (White)	0	0	0	1	0	0	2	X	3
Ontario (Cochrane)	2	1	0	0	1	2	0	X	6

==== Bronze-medal game ====
Thursday, March 28, 12:30

Sheet D	1	2	3	4	5	6	7	8	Final
Manitoba (Boehmer)	0	2	0	0	1	0	X	X	3
Alberta (White)	2	0	1	2	0	5	X	X	10

==== Final ====
Thursday, March 28, 12:30

Sheet E	1	2	3	4	5	6	7	8	Final
Saskatchewan (Korte)	2	1	0	0	3	0	0	2	8
Ontario (Cochrane)	0	0	1	1	0	1	1	0	4

== Women ==
=== Teams ===
The teams are listed as follows:

Province	Skip	Third	Second	Lead	Club(s)
Alberta	Glenys Bakker	Shannon Nimmo	Lesley McEwan	Diana McNallie	Garrison Curling Club, Calgary
British Columbia	Marilou Richter	Dawn Everest	Cindy Curtain	Deidre Riley	Penticton Curling Club, Penticton & Kelowna Curling Club, Kelowna
Manitoba	Terry Ursel	Wanda Rainka	Brenda Walker	Tracy Igonia	Arden Curling Club, Arden
New Brunswick	Judy Ross	Karen Craig-McAdam	Connie Nichol	Jane McGinn	Capital Winter Club, Fredericton
Newfoundland and Labrador	Diane Roberts	Heather Martin	Cathy Cunningham	Candy Thomas	Re/MAX Centre, St. John's
Northern Ontario	Kim Beaudry	Barb Roy	Wendy Brunetta	Kris Sinclair	Fort Frances Curling Club, Fort Frances
Northwest Territories	Sharon Cormier	Cheryl Tordoff	Heather Bilodeau	Wendy Ondrack	Yellowknife Curling Club, Yellowknife
Nova Scotia	Nancy McConnery	Marg Cutcliffe	Jill Alcoe-Holland	Andrea Salunier	Glooscap, Kentville, Lakeshore, Lower Sakville & Bridgewater Curling Club, Bridgewater
Nunavut	Geneva Chislett	Robyn Mackey	Diane North	Denise Hutchings	Iqaluit Curling Club, Iqaluit
Ontario	Sherry Middaugh	Karri-Lee Grant	Christine Loube	Jane Hooper-Perroud	The Thornhill Club, Thornhill
Prince Edward Island	Kim Aylward	Debbie Caissy	Shelley MacFadyen	Donna Whalen	Silver Fox Curling Club, Summerside
Quebec	Odette Trudel	Veronique Gingras	Manon Morin	Lorraine Levasseur	Club de curling Trois-Rivières, Trois-Rivières
Saskatchewan	Sherry Anderson	Patty Hersikorn	Brenda Goertzen	Anita Silvernagle	Nutana Curling Club, Saskatoon
Yukon	Rhonda Horte	Helen Strong	Laura Wilson	Shani Rittel	Whitehorse Curling Club, Whitehorse

=== Round-robin standings ===
Final Round Robin Standings

Key
Teams to Championship Pool

Pool A	Skip	W	L
Saskatchewan	Sherry Anderson	6	0
Northern Ontario	Kim Beaudry	4	2
British Columbia	Marilou Richter	3	3
Alberta	Glenys Bakker	3	3
Quebec	Odette Trudel	2	4
Northwest Territories	Sharon Cormier	2	4
Nunavut	Geneva Chislett	1	5

Pool B	Skip	W	L
Ontario	Sherry Middaugh	6	0
Manitoba	Terry Ursel	5	1
Nova Scotia	Nancy McConnery	4	2
Newfoundland and Labrador	Diane Roberts	3	3
Yukon	Rhonda Horte	2	4
New Brunswick	Judy Ross	1	5
Prince Edward Island	Kim Aylward	0	6

=== Championship Pool Standings ===
Final Championship Pool Standings

Key
Teams to Playoffs

Province	Skip	W	L
Ontario	Sherry Middaugh	9	1
Saskatchewan	Sherry Anderson	7	3
Alberta	Glenys Bakker	7	3
Manitoba	Terry Ursel	6	4
Northern Ontario	Kim Beaudry	6	4
Nova Scotia	Nancy McConnery	6	4
Newfoundland and Labrador	Diane Roberts	5	5
British Columbia	Marilou Richter	4	6

=== Seeding Pool Standings ===
Final Seeding Pool Standings

Province	Skip	W	L
Quebec	Odette Trudel	5	4
Northwest Territories	Sharon Cormier	5	4
Yukon	Rhonda Horte	3	6
Nunavut	Geneva Chislett	3	6
New Brunswick	Judy Ross	1	8
Prince Edward Island	Kim Aylward	0	9

=== Playoffs ===
Semifinal
1	Ontario	8
4	Manitoba	3
2	Saskatchewan	6
3	Alberta	4

Final
1	Ontario	7
2	Saskatchewan	11

Bronze-medal game
3	Alberta	8
4	Manitoba	3

==== Semifinals ====
Thursday, March 28, 8:30

Sheet E	1	2	3	4	5	6	7	8	Final
Ontario (Middaugh)	0	1	3	0	2	0	2	X	8
Manitoba (Ursel)	0	0	0	1	0	2	0	X	3

Sheet D	1	2	3	4	5	6	7	8	Final
Saskatchewan (Anderson)	0	1	0	1	0	1	2	1	6
Alberta (Bakker)	0	0	3	0	1	0	0	0	4

==== Bronze-medal game ====
Thursday, March 28, 15:30

Sheet D	1	2	3	4	5	6	7	8	Final
Alberta (Bakker)	1	0	3	0	1	1	2	X	8
Manitoba (Ursel)	0	2	0	1	0	0	0	X	3

==== Final ====
Thursday, March 28, 15:30

Sheet E	1	2	3	4	5	6	7	8	9	Final
Ontario (Middaugh)	0	0	4	0	2	0	0	1	0	7
Saskatchewan (Anderson)	0	0	0	3	0	3	1	0	4	11
