= List of teams on the 2015–16 World Curling Tour =

The following is a list of teams that participated on the 2015–16 World Curling Tour.

== Men's teams ==
Skips listed only

=== A-B ===
- (Japan) Shinya Abe
- (Saskatchewan) Carson Ackerman
- (Saskatchewan) Jason Ackerman
- (Ontario) Josh Adams
- (Nova Scotia) Shawn Adams
- (Alberta) Guy Algot
- (Russia) Artur Ali
- (Manitoba) Coard Allard
- (Manitoba) Sam Antila
- (Japan) Tomoji Arai
- (Nova Scotia) Trevor Archibald
- (Manitoba) Rob Atkins
- (Switzerland) Felix Attinger
- (United States) Josh Bahr
- (Ontario) Scott Bailey
- (Manitoba) Ray Baker
- (Alberta) Kurt Balderston
- (Ontario) Greg Balsdon
- (Switzerland) Christian Bangerter
- (Nova Scotia) Richard Barker
- (Germany) Alexander Baumann
- (Newfoundland and Labrador) Ken Bavis
- (Quebec) Mathieu Beaufort
- (Ontario) Travis Belchior
- (Ontario) Mark Bice
- (Switzerland) Simon Biedermann
- (United States) Todd Birr
- (Saskatchewan) Scott Bitz
- (Newfoundland and Labrador) Greg Blyde
- (Switzerland) Dimitri Boada
- (Manitoba) David Bohn
- (Manitoba) Dennis Bohn
- (Newfoundland and Labrador) Adam Boland
- (Ontario) John Bolton
- (Ontario) Trevor Bonot
- (Alberta) Brendan Bottcher
- (Alberta) Emery Boucher
- (Ontario) Jim Brackett
- (Ontario) Doug Bewer
- (Scotland) Tom Brewster
- (British Columbia) Richard Brower
- (United States) Craig Brown
- (Switzerland) Rolf Burggmann
- (United States) Jed Brundidge
- (Scotland) Cameron Bryce
- (Saskatchewan) Randy Bryden
- (Scotland) Robin Brydone
- (Ontario) Bryan Burgess

=== C ===
- (Nova Scotia) Mike Callaghan
- (Manitoba) Braden Calvert
- (Ontario) Mac Calwell
- (Saskatchewan) Darren Camm
- (Prince Edward Island) Robert Campbell
- (Manitoba) Reid Carruthers
- (New Brunswick) Peter Case
- (Prince Edward Island) Adam Casey
- (Ontario) Alex Champ
- (Ontario) Jordan Chandler
- (United States) Brady Clark
- (United States) Hunter Clawsson
- (Nova Scotia) Adam Cocks
- (Ontario) Jared Collie
- (Alberta) Robert Collins
- (Scotland) Moray Combe
- (New Brunswick) Rene Comeau
- (Saskatchewan) Scott Comfort
- (Manitoba) Joseph Comte
- (United States) Brandon Corbett
- (Ontario) Denis Cordick
- (British Columbia) Jim Cotter
- (Saskatchewan) Dale Craig
- (British Columbia) Wes Craig
- (Alberta) Warren Cross
- (United States) Jeff Currie
- (Ontario) Neil Currie

=== D-E ===
- (Alberta) Chad Dahlseide
- (Nova Scotia) Jamie Danbrook
- (British Columbia) Neil Dangerfield
- (Nova Scotia) Alan Darragh
- (Manitoba) Sean Davidson
- (Switzerland) Peter de Cruz
- (Spain) Antonio De Mollinedo
- (Nova Scotia) Nicholas Deagle
- (Saskatchewan) Ryan Deis
- (Ontario) Dayna Deruelle
- (Nova Scotia) Paul Dexter
- (British Columbia) Grant Dezura
- (Ontario) Ian Dickie
- (Quebec) William Dion
- (Netherlands) Jaap van Dorp
- (Ontario) Colin Dow
- (New Brunswick) Mitch Downey
- (Manitoba) Tyler Drews
- (United States) Korey Dropkin
- (United States) Stephen Dropkin
- (Russia) Andrey Drozdov
- (Manitoba) Matt Dunstone
- (Alberta) Kelsey Dusseault
- (Saskatchewan) Mike Eberle
- (Sweden) Niklas Edin
- (Ontario) John Epping
- (Russia) Alexander Eremin
- (Alberta) Jeff Erickson
- (Sweden) Gustav Eskilsson
- (Manitoba) Wayne Ewasko

=== F-G ===
- (United States) Mike Farbelow
- (Alberta) Dale Fellows
- (United States) Pete Fenson
- (United States) Riley Fenson
- (Ontario) Pat Ferris
- (Nova Scotia) Ian Fitzner-Leblanc
- (Nova Scotia) Mike Flemming
- (Manitoba) Alex Forrest
- (Quebec) Michael Fournier
- (Quebec) Adam Freilich
- (Alberta) Rhett Friesz
- (Japan) Hiroshi Fukui
- (United States) Greg Gallagher
- (Slovakia) Juraj Gallo
- (Saskatchewan) Ben Gamble
- (Ontario) Chris Gardner
- (British Columbia) Sean Geall
- (Saskatchewan) Brent Gedak
- (Alberta) Bob Genoway
- (United States) Dale Gibbs
- (British Columbia) Jeff Ginter
- (Ontario) Chris Glibota
- (United States) Geoff Goodland
- (Newfoundland and Labrador) Glenn Goss
- (New Brunswick) James Grattan
- (Ontario) Brent Gray
- (Alberta) Colin Griffith
- (Latvia) Ritvars Gulbis
- (Newfoundland and Labrador) Brad Gushue

=== H ===
- (Ontario) Al Hackner
- (Alberta) Glen Hanson
- (Scotland) Grant Hardie
- (Ontario) Mike Harris
- (Prince Edward Island) Tyler Harris
- (Saskatchewan) Kody Hartung
- (Alberta) Jeremy Harty
- (Newfoundland and Labrador) Paul Harvey
- (Ontario) Corry Heggestad
- (Saskatchewan) Brad Heidt
- (Saskatchewan) Josh Heidt
- (Quebec) Guy Hemmings
- (Switzerland) Jan Hess
- (Switzerland) Yves Hess
- (Alberta) Lloyd Hill
- (Nova Scotia) Nich Hilton
- (Japan) Kosuke Hirata
- (Norway) Markus Høiberg
- (Ontario) Mark Homan
- (Ontario) Tanner Horgan
- (United States) Daryl Horsman
- (British Columbia) Will House
- (Ontario) Glenn Howard
- (Alberta) Kevin Hrab
- (United States) Carroll Huntress
- (Saskatchewan) Justin Huri
- (Ontario) Rayad Hussain
- (Alberta) Mike Hutchings
- (Manitoba) Ryan Hyde
- (Manitoba) Tom Hyde

=== I-K ===
- (Japan) Tsukafumi Ikehata
- (Manitoba) Andrew Irving
- (Ontario) Bill Irwin
- (Manitoba) Steve Irwin
- (Japan) Kenji Iwasaki
- (United States) Bret Jackson
- (Nova Scotia) Matt Jackson
- (Ontario) Brad Jacobs
- (Saskatchewan) Jason Jacobson
- (Poland) Borys Jasiecki
- (Ontario) Willie Jeffries
- (British Columbia) Dean Joanisse
- (British Columbia) Michael Johnson
- (Ontario) Dylan Johnston
- (Ontario) Josh Johnston
- (Saskatchewan) Shawn Joyce
- (Switzerland) Paddy Käser
- (United States) Kevin Kakela
- (Japan) Junpei Kanda
- (Japan) Arihito Kasahara
- (Finland) Aku Kauste
- (Ontario) Mark Kean
- (Saskatchewan) Kris Keating
- (Ontario) Doug Kee
- (Switzerland) Reto Keller
- (Alberta) Harvey Kelts
- (New Brunswick) Mike Kennedy
- (Finland) Kalle Kiiskinen
- (South Korea) Kim Min-woo
- (South Korea) Kim Soo-hyuk
- (Kazakhstan) Viktor Kim
- (Alberta) Jamie King
- (Saskatchewan) Dean Kleiter
- (British Columbia) Tyler Klymchuk
- (Northwest Territories) Jamie Koe
- (Alberta) Kevin Koe
- (Ontario) Colin Koivula
- (Manitoba) Jared Kolomaya
- (Japan) Kenji Komoda
- (Japan) Nobukazu Komoribayashi
- (Alberta) Parker Konschuh
- (Saskatchewan) Bruce Korte
- (Ontario) Richard Krell
- (Japan) Hiromitsu Kurimaya

=== L ===
- (New Brunswick) Damien Lahiton
- (Nova Scotia) Paul Landry
- (Alberta) Tyler Lautner
- (Saskatchewan) Steve Laycock
- (Ontario) Ryan LeDrew
- (South Korea) Lee Ki-bok
- (United States) Alex Leichter
- (Manitoba) Ryan Lemoine
- (Alberta) Mike Libbus
- (Prince Edward Island) John Likely
- (United States) John Lilla
- (China) Liu Chenhao
- (China) Liu Rui
- (Alberta) Mick Lizmore
- (United States) Lionel Locke
- (Manitoba) Trevor Loreth
- (British Columbia) Thomas Love
- (Manitoba) William Lyburn

=== M ===
- (Alberta) Craig MacAlpine
- (Scotland) Ewan MacDonald
- (Nova Scotia) Brent MacDougall
- (Nova Scotia) Glen MacLeod
- (Scotland) Scott MacLeod
- (Switzerland) Dominik Märki
- (New Brunswick) Jeremy Mallais
- (Nova Scotia) Matthew Manuel
- (Manitoba) Kelly Marnoch
- (Alberta) Bert Martin
- (Ontario) Nathan Martin
- (British Columbia) Chase Martyn
- (Japan) Sinpei Matsumoto
- (Japan) Hayato Matsumura
- (Ontario) Codey Maus
- (British Columbia) Todd Maxwell
- (Nova Scotia) Robert Mayhew
- (Manitoba) Curtis McCannell
- (Ontario) Bruce McConnell
- (United States) Heat McCormick
- (Ontario) Ryan McCrady
- (Ontario) Gary McCullough
- (United States) Patrick Mcdonald
- (Manitoba) Miike McEwen
- (Ontario) Michael McGaugh
- (Manitoba) Taylor McIntyre
- (Ontario) Mike McLean
- (Saskatchewan) Shaun Meachem
- (Ontario) Tim Meadows
- (United States) Jon Medure
- (Alberta) Terry Meek
- (Quebec) Jean-Michel Ménard
- (British Columbia) Dave Merklinger
- (Ontario) Pascal Michaud
- (Switzerland) Sven Michel
- (Norway) Eirik Mjøn
- (Ontario) Dustin Montpellier
- (United States) Josh Moore
- (Nova Scotia) Tony Moore
- (Ontario) Dennis Moretto
- (Quebec) Pierre-Luc Morissette
- (Japan) Tasuhiro Morita
- (Japan) Yusuke Morozumi
- (Ontario) Tim Morrison
- (Scotland) Bruce Mouat
- (Alberta) Darren Moulding
- (Saskatchewan) Matthew Mourot
- (Quebec) Steven Munroe
- (Manitoba) Richard Muntain
- (Scotland) David Murdoch
- (Nova Scotia) Jamie Murphy

=== N-R ===
- (Hungary) Gyeorgy Nagy
- (Japan) Hideaki Nakamura
- (British Columbia) Andrew Nerpin
- (Alberta) Sean O'Connor
- (Nova Scotia) Alan O'Leary
- (Switzerland) Meico Öhninger
- (Japan) Ryo Ogihara
- (Japan) Satoshi Okada
- (Manitoba) Derek Oryniak
- (Switzerland) Fritz Oswald
- (Alberta) Kevin Park
- (Ontario) Ian Parker
- (Belarus) Aliaksei Parkhutsik
- (Nova Scotia) Matt Paul
- (New Brunswick) Rick Perron
- (Manitoba) Daley Peters
- (Wales) James Pougher
- (Ontario) Guy Racette
- (Manitoba) Scott Ramsay
- (Norway) Bendik Ramsfjell
- (Finland) Tomi Rantamaki
- (Alberta) Jon Rennie
- (Ontario) Rob Retchless
- (Italy) Joel Retornaz
- (New Brunswick) Jason Roach
- (Nova Scotia) Mike Robinson
- (Alberta) Roland Robinson
- (Ontario) Brent Ross
- (Newfoundland and Labrador) Rick Rowsell
- (Switzerland) Roman Ruch
- (Manitoba) JT Ryan

=== S ===
- (Nova Scotia) Kevin Saccary
- (Alberta) Tom Sallows
- (Nova Scotia) Wayne Sangster
- (Japan) Makoto Sato
- (United States) Brandon Scheel
- (British Columbia) Stephen Schneider
- (Germany) Felix Schulze
- (Switzerland) Yannick Schwaller
- (Switzerland) Kim-Lloyd Sciboz
- (Alberta) Thomas Scoffin
- (United States) Tom Scott
- (South Korea) Seong Se-hyeon
- (South Korea) Seong Yu-jin
- (Ontario) Daryl Shane
- (Saskatchewan) Ray Sharp
- (Scotland) Graham Shaw
- (Chinese Taipei) Randie Shen
- (Ontario) Michael Shepherd
- (United States) John Shuster
- (United States) Lyle Sieg
- (Manitoba) Steen Sigurdson
- (Czech Republic) David Sik
- (Alberta) Pat Simmons
- (Newfoundland and Labrador) Trent Skanes
- (Yukon) Bob Smallwood
- (Newfoundland and Labrador) Greg Smith
- (Scotland) Kyle Smith
- (Newfoundland and Labrador) Matthew Smith
- (Alberta) Scott Smith
- (United States) Tucker Smith
- (Czech Republic) Jiri Snitil
- (United States) Darryl Sobering
- (Ontario) Jon St. Denis
- (Saskatchewan) Jesse St. John
- (Alberta) John Steel
- (Nova Scotia) Shea Steele
- (Nova Scotia) Chad Stevens
- (Saskatchewan) Brayden Stewart
- (Denmark) Rasmus Stjerne
- (United States) Andrew Stopera
- (Alberta) John Stroh
- (Alberta) Karsten Sturmay
- (New Brunswick) Dave Sullivan
- (Switzerland) Marc Suter
- (Newfoundland and Labrador) Andrew Symonds

=== T-W ===
- (Japan) Naomasa Takeda
- (New Brunswick) Wayne Tallon
- (Japan) Yasumasa Tanida
- (British Columbia) Tyler Tardi
- (Newfoundland and Labrador) Andrew Taylor
- (Scotland) Stuart Taylor
- (Alberta) Charley Thomas
- (Newfoundland and Labrador) Colin Thomas
- (Nova Scotia) Stuart Thompson
- (Manitoba) Greg Todoruk
- (Newfoundland and Labrador) Stephen Trickett
- (Japan) Satoru Tsukamoto
- (Ontario) Wayne Tuck, Jr.
- (Denmark) Martin Udh Gronbech
- (Norway) Thomas Ulsrud
- (Japan) Kazuhisa Unoura
- (Finland) Markku Uusipaavalniemi
- (Alberta) Tyler van Amsterdam
- (New Brunswick) Jason Vaughan
- (Alberta) Brett Vavrek
- (British Columbia) Darrel Veiner
- (Quebec) Benoit Vezeau
- (Alberta) Brock Virtue
- (Saskatchewan) Shane Vollman
- (Ontario) Jake Walker
- (Alberta) Scott Webb
- (Alberta) Wade White
- (Alberta) Jessi Wilkinson
- (Ontario) Chris Wimmer
- (United States) Evan Workin
- (Sweden) Rasmus Wrana
- (Austria) Sebastian Wunderer
- (Switzerland) Kevin Wunderlin

=== Y-Z ===
- (Alberta) Kevin Yablonski
- (Alberta) Matt Yeo
- (South Korea) Yoo Hyun-jun
- (New Brunswick) Aaron Young
- (Ontario) John Young, Jr.
- (Alberta) Matt Zachary
- (Czech Republic) Michal Zdenka
- (China) Zhang Ze Zhong

== Women's teams ==
Skips listed only

=== A-B ===
- (New Brunswick) Melissa Adams
- (Scotland) Gina Aitken
- (Scotland) Karina Aitken
- (Ontario) Jennifer Allan
- (United States) Emily Anderson
- (Saskatchewan) Sherry Anderson
- (British Columbia) LeAnne Andrews
- (Italy) Federica Apollonio
- (Manitoba) Meghan Armit
- (Nova Scotia) Mary-Anne Arsenault
- (Ontario) Cathy Auld
- (Sweden) Greta Aurell
- (Alberta) Diana Backer
- (Ontario) Megan Balsdon
- (Saskatchewan) Brett Barber
- (Switzerland) Melanie Barbezat
- (Saskatchewan) Penny Barker
- (Manitoba) Shannon Birchard
- (Prince Edward Island) Suzanne Birt
- (Latvia) Santa Blumbergs
- (Ontario) Marilyn Bodogh
- (Prince Edward Island) Shelly Bradley
- (Nova Scotia) Theresa Breen
- (United States) Emily Brekke
- (Manitoba) Meaghan Brezden
- (Alberta) Chantele Broderson
- (Nova Scotia) Jill Brothers
- (British Columbia) Corryn Brown
- (United States) Erika Brown
- (Manitoba) Joelle Brown
- (Manitoba) Laura Burtnyk
- (Ontario) Celeste Butler-Rohland
- (Ontario) Nicole Butler-Rohland

=== C-D ===
- (Ontario) Chrissy Cadorin
- (Saskatchewan) Jolene Campbell
- (Alberta) Chelsea Carey
- (United States) Alexandra Carlson
- (United States) Cory Christensen
- (Alberta) Nadine Chyz
- (United States) Cristin Clark
- (Manitoba) Jennifer Clark-Rouire
- (Ontario) Kelly Cochrane
- (Ontario) Katie Cottrill
- (Newfoundland and Labrador) Stacie Curtis
- (British Columbia) Sarah Daniels
- (Ontario) Courtney de Winter
- (Alberta) Janais DeJong
- (Russia) Evgeniya Demkina
- (British Columbia) Kim Dennis
- (Saskatchewan) Alyssa Despins
- (Manitoba) Jackie Dewar
- (Saskatchewan) Alexa Dixon
- (Prince Edward Island) Kim Dolan
- (British Columbia) Holly Donaldson
- (China) Dong Zi Qi
- (Alberta) Norma Douglass
- (Germany) Daniela Driendl
- (Nova Scotia) Coralie Duchemin
- (Denmark) Madeleine Dupont
- (Saskatchewan) Kelsey Dutton
- (Nova Scotia) Emily Dwyer

=== E-G ===
- (Manitoba) Kerri Einarson
- (Saskatchewan) Michelle Englot
- (Nova Scotia) Mary Fay
- (Switzerland) Binia Feltscher
- (Saskatchewan) Kourtney Fesser
- (British Columbia) Sandy Fister
- (Ontario) Allison Flaxey
- (Scotland) Hannah Fleming
- (Saskatchewan) Shalon Fleming
- (Ontario) Tracy Fleury
- (Alberta) Karynn Flory
- (England) Anna Fowler
- (Ontario) Susan Froud
- (Japan) Satsuki Fujisawa
- (Northwest Territories) Kerry Galusha
- (Nova Scotia) Christie Gamble
- (Ontario) Jaimee Gardner
- (United States) Courtney George
- (British Columbia) Amy Gibson
- (Ontario) Courtney Gilder
- (South Korea) Gim Un-chi
- (Switzerland) Lisa Gisler
- (Newfoundland and Labrador) Brooke Godsland
- (New Brunswick) Shelly Graham
- (Scotland) Lauren Gray
- (British Columbia) Diane Gushulak

=== H-J ===
- (Alberta) Teryn Hamilton
- (New Brunswick) Heidi Hanlon
- (Ontario) Jenn Hanna
- (Newfoundland and Labrador) Shelley Hardy
- (Ontario) Jacqueline Harrison
- (Alberta) Michelle Hartwell
- (Manitoba) Janet Harvey
- (British Columbia) Winter Harvey
- (Sweden) Anna Hasselborg
- (Ontario) Julie Hastings
- (Switzerland) Ursi Hegner
- (Alberta) Kellie Henricks
- (Saskatchewan) Patty Hersikorn
- (Newfoundland and Labrador) Sarah Hill
- (Ontario) Rachel Homan
- (Ontario) Lauren Horton
- (South Korea) Hwang Su-bin
- (Japan) Rina Ida
- (Ontario) Danielle Inglis
- (Saskatchewan) Nancy Inglis
- (Scotland) Sophie Jackson
- (Nova Scotia) Virginia Jackson
- (Switzerland) Michèle Jäggi
- (South Korea) Jang Hye-ji
- (China) Jiang Xindi
- (Nova Scotia) Colleen Jones
- (Manitoba) Jennifer Jones

=== K-L ===
- (Alberta) Jessie Kaufman
- (Alberta) Nicky Kaufman
- (Finland) Oona Kauste
- (Japan) Mioko Kawasaki
- (Ontario) Mallory Kean
- (South Korea) Kim Eun-jung
- (South Korea) Kim Ji-suk
- (South Korea) Kim Su-ji
- (Alberta) Cathy King
- (Japan) Mizuki Kitaguchi
- (Saskatchewan) Chaelynn Kitz
- (Alberta) Shannon Kleibrink
- (British Columbia) Patti Knezevic
- (Japan) Touri Koana
- (Manitoba) Tina Kozak
- (Czech Republic) Anna Kubeskova
- (Ontario) Kerry Lackie
- (United States) Patti Lank
- (Quebec) Marie-France Larouche
- (Saskatchewan) Stefanie Lawton
- (Ontario) Cassandra Lewin
- (British Columbia) Kristy Lewis
- (United States) Abigayle Lindgren
- (Manitoba) Kim Link
- (China) Liu Sijia
- (Alberta) Terri Loblaw
- (Sweden) Towe Lundman

=== M ===
- (Latvia) Ineta Maca
- (Nova Scotia) Kristen MacDiarmid
- (Manitoba) Christine MacKay
- (Switzerland) Isabelle Maillard
- (Alberta) Lindsay Markichuk
- (New Brunswick) Srah Mallais
- (Quebec) Lauren Mann
- (Alberta) Jodi Marthaller
- (Saskatchewan) Nancy Martin
- (Alberta) Chana Martineau
- (Switzerland) Alisha Mathis
- (Nova Scotia) Mary Mattatall
- (Ontario) Cheryl McBain
- (Ontario) Krista McCarville
- (Nova Scotia) Nancy McConnery
- (Manitoba) Deb McCreanor
- (Manitoba) Kristy McDonald
- (Nova Scotia) Julie McEvoy
- (Ontario) Janet McGhee
- (Nova Scotia) Carina McKay-Saturino
- (Manitoba) Tiffany McLean
- (United States) Joyance Meechai
- (China) Mei Jie
- (Manitoba) Lisa Menard
- (Ontario) Sherry Middaugh
- (Russia) Victorya Moiseeva
- (Alberta) Amanda Moizis
- (Estonia) Maile Mölder
- (Manitoba) Michelle Montford
- (Saskatchewan) Kristie Moore
- (Nova Scotia) Monica Moriarty
- (Ontario) Erin Morrissey
- (Scotland) Eve Muirhead
- (Alberta) Morgan Muise
- (Scotland) Katie Murray

=== N-R ===
- (Denmark) Lene Nielsen
- (Japan) Kyoko Nishizawa
- (Nova Scotia) Jocelyn Nix
- (Alberta) Susan O'Connor
- (United States) Norma O'Leary
- (Japan) Ayumi Ogasawara
- (Alberta) Sherrilee Orsted
- (Newfoundland and Labrador) Pam Osborne
- (Sweden) Cecilia Östlund
- (Manitoba) Cathy Overton-Clapham
- (Switzerland) Alina Pätz
- (Hungary) Dorottya Palancsa
- (Alberta) Kalynn Park
- (United States) Barb Payette
- (Quebec) Roxane Perron
- (United States) Tina Persinger
- (Ontario) Samantha Peters
- (Manitoba) Beth Peterson
- (Nova Scotia) Tanya Phillips
- (Ontario) Christine Pierce
- (Nova Scotia) Colleen Pinkney
- (British Columbia) Stephanie Prinse
- (Alberta) Geri-Lynn Ramsay
- (Manitoba) Cheryl Reed
- (Latvia) Evita Regza
- (Manitoba) Jacki Rintoul
- (Newfoundland and Labrador) Rebecca Roberts
- (Manitoba) Darcy Robertson
- (New Brunswick) Sylvie Robichaud
- (Alberta) Kelsey Rocque
- (Ontario) Caitlin Romain
- (New Brunswick) Jessica Ronalds
- (United States) Nina Roth
- (Sweden) Karin Rudstrom
- (United States) Melissa Runing
- (British Columbia) Amanda Russett
- (South Korea) Ryu Young-iu

=== S-T ===
- (Japan) Natsuki Saito
- (Switzerland) Tanja Santschi
- (Alberta) Bobbie Sauder
- (Alberta) Casey Scheidegger
- (Saskatchewan) Kim Schneider
- (Germany) Andrea Schöpp
- (United States) Jessica Schultz
- (British Columbia) Kelly Scott
- (Saskatchewan) Mandy Selzer
- (Japan) Emi Shimizu
- (Russia) Anna Sidorova
- (Sweden) Margaretha Sigfridsson
- (Saskatchewan) Robyn Silvernagle
- (United States) Jamie Sinclair
- (Norway) Kristin Skaslien
- (Alberta) Kayla Skrlik
- (Manitoba) Barb Spencer
- (Switzerland) Elena Stern
- (Alberta) Kristen Streifel
- (Alberta) Rebecca Stretch
- (Newfoundland and Labrador) Heather Strong
- (Alberta) Selena Sturmay
- (Alberta) Valerie Sweeting
- (Poland) Marta Szeliga-Frynia
- (Japan) Nozomi Tamura
- (Japan) Sena Tamura
- (Manitoba) Shannon Tatlock
- (Kazakhstan) Olga Ten
- (British Columbia) Karla Thompson
- (Manitoba) Jill Thurston
- (Ontario) Julie Tippin
- (Switzerland) Silvana Tirinzoni
- (Saskatchewan) Brooke Tokarz
- (Japan) Kai Tsuchiya
- (Japan) Ayano Tuchiya

=== U-Z ===
- (Manitoba) Terry Ursel
- (Ontario) Stephanie Van Huyse
- (British Columbia) Kesa Van Osch
- (Ontario) Rhonda Varnes
- (Saskatchewan) Lana Vey
- (Poland) Adela Walczak
- (China) Wang Xueyi
- (British Columbia) Sarah Wark
- (Manitoba) Kristy Watling
- (Ontario) Ashley Waye
- (Ontario) Riley Weagant
- (United States) Becca Wood
- (Sweden) Isabella Wranå
- (China) Yan Xue Qi
- (Alberta) Nola Zingel
