= 2018 Canadian Senior Curling Championships =

- Host city: Stratford, Ontario
- Arena: Stratford Rotary Complex
- Dates: March 24 to 29, 2018
- Men's winner: Ontario
- Curling club: Russell Curling Club, Russell
- Skip: Bryan Cochrane
- Third: Ian MacAulay
- Second: Morgan Currie
- Lead: Ken Sullivan
- Finalist: New Brunswick
- Women's winner: Saskatchewan
- Curling club: Nutana Curling Club, Saskatoon
- Skip: Sherry Anderson
- Third: Patty Hersikorn
- Second: Brenda Goertzen
- Lead: Anita Silvernagle
- Finalist: Nova Scotia

The 2018 Canadian Senior Curling Championships was held March 24 to 29, 2018 in Stratford, Ontario.

== Men's ==
=== Teams ===
The teams are listed as follows:

Province	Skip	Third	Second	Lead	Club(s)
Alberta	Wade White	Barry Chwedoruk	Dan Holowaychuk	George White	Lac La Biche Curling Club, Lac La Biche
British Columbia	Craig Lepine	Stan Walker	Craig McLeod	Mike Pelech	Cloverdale, Langley, Vancouver and Penticton Curling Clubs
Manitoba	Dave Boehmer	Terry McRae	Tom Want	George Hacking	Petersfield Curling Club, Petersfield
New Brunswick	Terry Odishaw	Mike Kennedy	Marc LeCocq	Grant Odishaw	Curl Moncton, Moncton
Newfoundland and Labrador	Mike Ryan	Gary Wensman	Barry Edwards	Neil Peckham	Carol Curling Club, Labrador City
Northern Ontario	Al Hackner	Eric Harnden	Frank Morissette	Gary Champagne	Fort William Curling Club, Thunder Bay
Northwest Territories	Glen Hudy	Brian Kelln	Franz Dziuba	Richard Klakowich	Yellowknife Curling Centre, Yellowknife
Nova Scotia	Alan O'Leary	Stuart MacLean	Danny Christianson	Harold McCarthy	Dartmouth Curling Club, Dartmouth
Nunavut	Peter Mackey	Jeff Nadeau	Greg Howard	Ed North	Iqaluit Curling Club, Iqaluit
Ontario	Bryan Cochrane	Ian MacAulay	Morgan Currie	Ken Sullivan	Russell Curling Club, Russell
Prince Edward Island	Bill Hope	Craig Mackie	Peter Murdoch	David Murphy	Cornwall Curling Club, Cornwall
Quebec	Ted Butler	Rick Faguy	Jean-Pierre Croteau	Michel Laroche	Buckingham Curling Club, Buckingham
Saskatchewan	Darrell McKee	Mark Lane	Dan Kennedy	Rodney Antonichuk	Nutana Curling Club, Saskatoon
Yukon	Pat Paslawski	Terry Miller	Doug Hamilton	Don McPhee	Whitehorse Curling Club, Whitehorse

=== Round-robin standings ===
Key
Teams to Championship Pool

Pool A	Skip	W	L
Northern Ontario	Al Hackner	5	1
Quebec	Ted Butler	5	1
Alberta	Wade White	5	1
Saskatchewan	Darrell McKee	3	3
Yukon	Pat Paslawski	2	4
Newfoundland and Labrador	Mike Ryan	1	5
Nunavut	Peter Mackey	0	6

Pool B	Skip	W	L
Ontario	Bryan Cochrane	5	1
Manitoba	Dave Boehmer	4	2
New Brunswick	Terry Odishaw	4	2
Nova Scotia	Alan O'Leary	3	3
British Columbia	Greg Lepine	2	4
Northwest Territories	Glen Hudy	2	4
Prince Edward Island	Bill Hope	1	5

=== Championship Pool Standings ===
Key
Teams to Playoffs

Province	Skip	W	L
Northern Ontario	Al Hackner	8	2
Ontario	Bryan Cochrane	8	2
Quebec	Ted Butler	8	2
New Brunswick	Terry Odishaw	7	3
Manitoba	Dave Boehmer	6	4
Alberta	Wade White	6	4
Saskatchewan	Darrell McKee	4	6
Nova Scotia	Alan O'Leary	3	7

=== Seeding Pool Standings ===
Province	Skip	W	L
British Columbia	Craig Lepine	5	4
Yukon	Pat Paslawski	4	5
Northwest Territories	Glen Hudy	3	6
Prince Edward Island	Bill Hope	3	6
Newfoundland and Labrador	Mike Ryan	2	7
Nunavut	Peter Mackey	0	9

=== Playoffs ===
Semifinal
1	Northern Ontario	3
4	New Brunswick	5
2	Ontario	5
3	Quebec	4

Final
4	New Brunswick	2
2	Ontario	5

Bronze Medal Game
1	Northern Ontario	7
3	Quebec	6

== Women ==
=== Teams ===
The teams are listed as follows:

Province	Skip	Third	Second	Lead	Club(s)
Alberta	Terri Loblaw	Judy Pendergast	Sandy Bell	Cheryl Hall	North Hill, Calgary and Medicine Hat Curling Clubs
British Columbia	Lynne Noble	Penny Shantz	Colleen Robson	Karen Lepine	Qualicum, Parksville, Comox, Langley and Cloverdale Curling Clubs
Manitoba	Kim Link	Karen Fallis	Lynn Fallis-Kurz	Renee Fletcher	East St. Paul Curling Club, East St. Paul
New Brunswick	Heidi Hanlon	Kathy Floyd	Judy Blanchard	Jane Arseneau	Thistle St. Andrews Curling Club, Saint John
Newfoundland and Labrador	Diane Roberts	Heather Martin	Patricia Tiller	Candy Thomas	Re/MAX Centre, St. John's
Northern Ontario	Peggy Taylor	Lisa Penner	Arleen Wilcox	Tracy Stasiuk	Kenora Curling Club, Kenora
Northwest Territories	Sharon Cormier	Cheryl Tordoff	Heather Bilodeau	Debbie Moss	Yellowknife Curling Centre, Yellowknife
Nova Scotia	Mary Mattatall	Marg Cutcliffe	Jill Alcoe-Holland	Andrea Salunier	Glooscap, Lakeshore and Mayflower Curling Clubs
Nunavut	Geneva Chislett	Diane North	Robyn Mackey	Val Kosmenko	Iqaluit Curling Club, Iqaluit
Ontario	Colleen Madonia	Karri-Lee Grant	Christine Loube	Jane Hooper-Perroud	The Thornhill Club, Thornhill
Prince Edward Island	Shirley Berry	Janice Murdoch	Arlene Harris	Kim Nicholson	Cornwall Curling Club, Cornwall
Quebec	Odette Trudel	Veronique Gingras	Manon Morin	Lorraine Levasseur	Club de curling Trois-Rivières, Trois-Rivières
Saskatchewan	Sherry Anderson	Patty Hersikorn	Brenda Goertzen	Anita Silvernagle	Nutana Curling Club, Saskatoon
Yukon	Sandra Mikkelsen	Helen Strong	Laura Wilson	Shani Rittel	Whitehorse Curling Club, Whitehorse

=== Round-robin standings ===
Key
Teams to Championship Pool

Pool A	Skip	W	L
Nova Scotia	Mary Mattatall	6	0
New Brunswick	Heidi Hanlon	5	1
Saskatchewan	Sherry Anderson	4	2
Quebec	Odette Trudel	2	4
Alberta	Terri Loblaw	2	4
Northwest Territories	Sharon Cormier	2	4
Yukon	Sandra Mikkelsen	0	6

Pool B	Skip	W	L
Ontario	Colleen Madonia	6	0
British Columbia	Lynne Noble	4	2
Newfoundland and Labrador	Diane Roberts	3	3
Northern Ontario	Peggy Taylor	3	3
Prince Edward Island	Shirley Berry	3	3
Manitoba	Kim Link	2	4
Nunavut	Geneva Chislett	0	6

=== Championship Pool Standings ===
Key
Teams to Playoffs

Province	Skip	W	L
Nova Scotia	Mary Mattatall	9	1
Saskatchewan	Sherry Anderson	8	2
Ontario	Colleen Madonia	8	2
British Columbia	Lynne Noble	7	3
New Brunswick	Heidi Hanlon	6	4
Newfoundland and Labrador	Diane Roberts	4	6
Northern Ontario	Peggy Taylor	4	6
Quebec	Odette Trudel	3	7

=== Seeding Pool Standings ===
Province	Skip	W	L
Manitoba	Kim Link	5	4
Northwest Territories	Sharon Cormier	4	5
Alberta	Terri Loblaw	4	5
Prince Edward Island	Shirley Berry	4	5
Yukon	Sandra Mikkelsen	1	8
Nunavut	Geneva Chislett	0	9

=== Playoffs ===
Semifinal
1	Nova Scotia	6
4	British Columbia	4
2	Saskatchewan	7
3	Ontario	4

Final
1	Nova Scotia	6
2	Saskatchewan	7

Bronze Medal Game
3	Ontario	9
4	British Columbia	3
