= 2020 PEI Tankard =

2020 PEI Tankard Men's Championship
- Host city: Montague, Prince Edward Island
- Arena: Montague Curling Rink
- Dates: January 8–12
- Winner: Team Cochrane
- Curling club: Cornwall CC, Cornwall
- Skip: Bryan Cochrane
- Third: Ian MacAulay
- Second: Morgan Currie
- Lead: Mark O'Rourke
- Finalist: Philip Gorveatt / Eddie MacKenzie

The 2020 PEI Tankard, the provincial men's curling championship for Prince Edward Island, was held from January 8 to 12 at the Montague Curling Rink in Montague, Prince Edward Island. The winning Bryan Cochrane rink represented Prince Edward Island at the 2020 Tim Hortons Brier in Kingston, Ontario and finished with a 2–5 record. The event was held in conjunction with the 2020 Prince Edward Island Scotties Tournament of Hearts, the provincial women's championship.

The Cochrane rink went undefeated through the whole tournament, not losing a game as they won all three qualifying events.

== Teams ==
The teams are listed as follows:

Skip	Third	Second	Lead	Alternate	Club
Bryan Cochrane	Ian MacAulay	Morgan Currie	Mark O'Rourke		Cornwall Curling Club, Cornwall
Philip Gorveatt	Kevin Champion	Sean Ledgerwood	Mike Dillon		Charlottetown Curling Club, Charlottetown
Darren Higgins	Terry Arsenault	Mike Spencer	Jonathan Greenan		Silver Fox Curling Club, Summerside
John Likely	Ryan Abraham	Steve Burgess	Jake Flemming		Cornwall Curling Club, Cornwall
Eddie MacKenzie	Tyler MacKenzie	Tyler Smith	Matt Nabuurs		Charlottetown Curling Club, Charlottetown
Keith Nabuurs	Bennett Crane	Robert Donahoe	Adam Nabuurs		Montague Curling Club, Montague
Jamie Newson	Dennis Watts	Erik Brodersen	Andrew MacDougall	Doug MacGregor	Silver Fox Curling Club, Summerside
Philip MacDonald	Shane MacDonald	Ernie Mutch	Alan Munro		Montague Curling Club, Montague
Rod MacDonald	Tyler Harris	Sean Clarey	Paul Brown		Charlottetown Curling Club, Charlottetown
Mitchell Schut	Chase MacMillan	Liam Kelly	Cruz Pineau		Cornwall Curling Club, Cornwall
Steve vanOuwerkerk	Sam Ramsay	Nick vanOuwerkerk	Patrick Ramsay		Cornwall Curling Club, Cornwall

== Knockout brackets ==
=== A event ===
A Event
Mitchell Schut	7
Rod MacDonald	8
Keith Nabuurs	3
John Likely	12
Eddie MacKenzie	7
Philip MacDonald	4

Quarterfinals
Philip Gorveatt	7
Steve vanOuwerkerk	8
Bryan Cochrane	6
Rod MacDonald	4
Jamie Newson	3
John Likely	9
Darren Higgins	6
Eddie MacKenzie	10

Semifinals
Steve vanOuwerkerk	3
Bryan Cochrane	10
John Likely	3
Eddie MacKenzie	8

A Final
Bryan Cochrane	8
Eddie MacKenzie	1

=== B event ===
B Event
Keith Nabuurs	4
Philip Gorveatt	10
Philip MacDonald	8
Rod MacDonald	9
Mitchell Schut	12
Jamie Newson	9

Round of 16
Philip Gorveatt	6
Rod MacDonald	5
Darren Higgins	7
Mitchell Schut	6

Quarterfinals
Philip Gorveatt	5
John Likely	4
Steve vanOuwerkerk	6
Darren Higgins	5

Semifinals
Philip Gorveatt	3
Bryan Cochrane	5
Eddie MacKenzie	12
Steve vanOuwerkerk	5

B Final
Bryan Cochrane	8
Eddie MacKenzie	4

=== C event ===
C Event (Top half)		Quarterfinals		Semifinals		To C Final
				Philip Gorveatt	8
Jamie Newson	9			Jamie Newson	7
Rod MacDonald	1	Jamie Newson	10
		Darren Higgins	4
						Philip Gorveatt	7
						Eddie MacKenzie	6

C Event (Bottom half)
Keith Nabuurs	4
Philip MacDonald	11

Round of 16
Philip MacDonald	8
Mitchell Schut	11

Quarterfinals
John Likely	4
Mitchell Schut	6

Semifinals
Steve vanOuwerkerk	2
Mitchell Schut	7

To C Final
Bryan Cochrane	8
Mitchell Schut	1
C Final
Philip Gorveatt	4
Bryan Cochrane	7

== Knockout results ==
=== Draw 1 ===
Wednesday, January 8, 9:00 am

Sheet 1	1	2	3	4	5	6	7	8	9	10	Final
Mitchell Schut	0	2	0	0	2	1	0	2	0	0	7
Rod MacDonald 🔨	3	0	3	0	0	0	1	0	0	1	8

Sheet 2	1	2	3	4	5	6	7	8	9	10	Final
Keith Nabuurs	0	1	0	0	0	0	1	1	0	X	3
John Likely 🔨	2	0	1	4	1	3	0	0	1	X	12

Sheet 3	1	2	3	4	5	6	7	8	9	10	Final
Eddie MacKenzie 🔨	1	0	0	0	2	1	2	1	0	X	7
Philip MacDonald	0	1	1	1	0	0	0	0	1	X	4

Sheet 4	1	2	3	4	5	6	7	8	9	10	Final
Philip Gorveatt 🔨	1	0	1	0	0	1	3	0	1	0	7
Steve vanOuwerkerk	0	1	0	1	1	0	0	4	0	1	8

=== Draw 2 ===
Wednesday, January 8, 2:00 pm

Sheet 2	1	2	3	4	5	6	7	8	9	10	Final
Darren Higgins 🔨	1	0	0	2	0	2	0	1	X	X	6
Eddie MacKenzie	0	4	0	0	3	0	3	0	X	X	10

Sheet 3	1	2	3	4	5	6	7	8	9	10	Final
Jamie Newson	0	0	2	0	0	1	0	X	X	X	3
John Likely 🔨	1	1	0	2	4	0	1	X	X	X	9

Sheet 4	1	2	3	4	5	6	7	8	9	10	Final
Bryan Cochrane	0	0	0	2	0	0	0	4	0	X	6
Rod MacDonald 🔨	1	0	0	0	0	0	2	0	1	X	4

=== Draw 3 ===
Wednesday, January 8, 7:00 pm

Sheet 1	1	2	3	4	5	6	7	8	9	10	Final
Philip MacDonald 🔨	0	1	2	0	1	0	2	0	2	X	8
Rod MacDonald	1	0	0	2	0	3	0	3	0	X	9

Sheet 3	1	2	3	4	5	6	7	8	9	10	Final
Keith Nabuurs 🔨	2	0	1	0	0	0	0	1	X	X	4
Philip Gorveatt	0	4	0	2	3	0	1	0	X	X	10

Sheet 4	1	2	3	4	5	6	7	8	9	10	Final
Mitchell Schut	0	1	0	2	0	2	0	2	3	2	12
Jamie Newson 🔨	2	0	2	0	1	0	4	0	0	0	9

=== Draw 4 ===
Thursday, January 9, 9:00 am

Sheet 1	1	2	3	4	5	6	7	8	9	10	Final
Steve vanOuwerkerk	0	2	0	1	0	X	X	X	X	X	3
Bryan Cochrane 🔨	4	0	2	0	4	X	X	X	X	X	10

Sheet 4	1	2	3	4	5	6	7	8	9	10	Final
John Likely	0	0	1	0	0	1	0	1	X	X	3
Eddie MacKenzie 🔨	0	2	0	2	1	0	3	0	X	X	8

=== Draw 5 ===
Thursday, January 9, 2:00 pm

Sheet 2	1	2	3	4	5	6	7	8	9	10	Final
Keith Nabuurs	1	0	0	0	1	0	2	0	0	X	4
Philip MacDonald 🔨	0	2	3	1	0	1	0	2	2	X	11

Sheet 3	1	2	3	4	5	6	7	8	9	10	11	Final
Darren Higgins	0	1	0	1	1	0	1	0	2	0	1	7
Mitchell Schut 🔨	1	0	2	0	0	1	0	1	0	1	0	6

Sheet 4	1	2	3	4	5	6	7	8	9	10	Final
Philip Gorveatt	0	2	0	1	0	0	0	2	0	1	6
Rod MacDonald 🔨	1	0	1	0	0	2	0	0	1	0	5

=== Draw 6 ===
Thursday, January 9, 7:00 pm

Sheet 1	1	2	3	4	5	6	7	8	9	10	Final
Philip Gorveatt 🔨	1	0	1	0	1	0	0	1	0	1	5
John Likely	0	1	0	1	0	0	1	0	1	0	4

Sheet 2	1	2	3	4	5	6	7	8	9	10	Final
Bryan Cochrane	1	1	3	1	0	0	1	1	X	X	8
Eddie MacKenzie 🔨	0	0	0	0	1	0	0	0	X	X	1

Sheet 4	1	2	3	4	5	6	7	8	9	10	Final
Steve vanOuwerkerk 🔨	2	0	1	0	0	0	1	0	0	2	6
Darren Higgins	0	2	0	0	1	1	0	0	1	0	5

=== Draw 7 ===
Friday, January 10, 9:00 am

Sheet 1	1	2	3	4	5	6	7	8	9	10	Final
Philip MacDonald 🔨	0	1	0	2	0	3	0	2	0	0	8
Mitchell Schut	1	0	2	0	4	0	2	0	1	1	11

Sheet 2	1	2	3	4	5	6	7	8	9	10	Final
Jamie Newson	2	1	1	1	1	0	3	X	X	X	9
Rod MacDonald 🔨	0	0	0	0	0	1	0	X	X	X	1

=== Draw 8 ===
Friday, January 10, 2:00 pm

Sheet 1	1	2	3	4	5	6	7	8	9	10	Final
Eddie MacKenzie 🔨	3	1	0	1	4	0	3	X	X	X	12
Steve vanOuwerkerk	0	0	2	0	0	3	0	X	X	X	5

Sheet 2	1	2	3	4	5	6	7	8	9	10	Final
Philip Gorveatt 🔨	1	0	0	0	0	0	1	1	0	0	3
Bryan Cochrane	0	2	0	2	0	0	0	0	0	1	5

Sheet 3	1	2	3	4	5	6	7	8	9	10	Final
Jamie Newson 🔨	3	0	2	0	1	0	4	X	X	X	10
Darren Higgins	0	0	0	1	0	3	0	X	X	X	4

Sheet 4	1	2	3	4	5	6	7	8	9	10	Final
John Likely	1	0	0	0	1	1	0	0	1	0	4
Mitchell Schut 🔨	0	0	1	1	0	0	1	2	0	1	6

=== Draw 9 ===
Friday, January 10, 7:00 pm

Sheet 3	1	2	3	4	5	6	7	8	9	10	Final
Bryan Cochrane 🔨	0	0	3	0	1	0	1	0	0	3	8
Eddie MacKenzie	0	0	0	1	0	0	0	2	1	0	4

=== Draw 10 ===
Saturday, January 11, 9:00 am

Sheet 2	1	2	3	4	5	6	7	8	9	10	Final
Steve vanOuwerkerk	0	0	0	0	0	0	0	2	0	X	2
Mitchell Schut 🔨	0	0	0	1	2	1	1	0	2	X	7

Sheet 4	1	2	3	4	5	6	7	8	9	10	11	Final
Philip Gorveatt	0	1	0	1	0	0	1	2	0	2	1	8
Jamie Newson 🔨	1	0	2	0	2	0	0	0	2	0	0	7

=== Draw 11 ===
Saturday, January 11, 2:00 pm

Sheet 1	1	2	3	4	5	6	7	8	9	10	Final
Bryan Cochrane	0	0	2	0	1	2	2	1	X	X	8
Mitchell Schut 🔨	0	1	0	0	0	0	0	0	X	X	1

Sheet 2	1	2	3	4	5	6	7	8	9	10	11	Final
Philip Gorveatt 🔨	0	0	2	0	0	0	3	0	1	0	1	7
Eddie MacKenzie	0	0	0	1	1	1	0	1	0	2	0	6

=== Draw 12 ===
Saturday, January 11, 7:00 pm

Sheet 3	1	2	3	4	5	6	7	8	9	10	Final
Philip Gorveatt	0	2	0	0	0	1	0	1	0	0	4
Bryan Cochrane 🔨	2	0	0	0	3	0	0	0	1	1	7

== Playoffs ==
- No playoffs were required as the Bryan Cochrane rink won all three qualifying events.

Semifinal		Final
		A	Bryan Cochrane
B	Bryan Cochrane
C	Bryan Cochrane

=== Semifinal ===
Sunday, January 12, 9:00 am

Sheet 2	1	2	3	4	5	6	7	8	9	10	Final
Bryan Cochrane											0
Bryan Cochrane											0

=== Final ===
Sunday, January 12, 2:00 pm

Sheet 3	1	2	3	4	5	6	7	8	9	10	Final
Bryan Cochrane											0
											0

2020 PEI Tankard
(Prince Edward Island)
Bryan Cochrane
1st PEI Provincial Championship title
