= Morgan Currie =

Canadian curler

Medal record

Curling

World Senior Curling Championships
Gold medal – first place	2019 Stavanger	

Morgan Currie (born May 20, 1964 in Summerside, Prince Edward Island) is a Canadian curler from Ottawa, Ontario.

In 1997, Currie won the Ontario Mixed Curling Championship throwing second on a team skipped by Jim Hunker. The team finished with a 2–9 record at the 1997 Canadian Mixed Curling Championship.

Currie joined the Bryan Cochrane senior men's team for the 2017–18 curling season at second. The team won the 2018 Ontario Senior Men's Curling Championship and represented Ontario at the 2018 Canadian Senior Curling Championships. The team went on to win the Canadian Seniors, qualifying the rink to represent Canada at the 2019 World Senior Curling Championships. The team went undefeated at Worlds, taking home the gold medal. The team won a second straight Ontario Senior title in 2019, and again represented Ontario at the 2019 Canadian Senior Curling Championships. There, they made it to the final where they lost to Team Saskatchewan, skipped by Bruce Korte.

Two members of the Cochrane Senior rink - Currie and third Ian MacAulay are both natives of Prince Edward Island (but are residents of Ontario). New rules by Curling Canada instituted for the 2020 curling season allowed curlers to represent the province of their birth (rather than just residency) for the Tim Hortons Brier. Because of this, the team brought in a new lead from PEI (Mark O'Rourke) and kept Cochrane as their "import player" and played in the 2020 PEI Tankard. The team won the Tankard, and qualified to represent PEI at the 2020 Tim Hortons Brier.

== Personal life ==
Currie is a retired chief of staff at the Competition Bureau of Canada. He is married to Cathy Piccinin, who played third on Currie's 1997 Ontario mixed team.
