= 2020 Prince Edward Island Scotties Tournament of Hearts =

2020 PEI Scotties Tournament of Hearts Women's Championship
- Host city: Montague, Prince Edward Island
- Arena: Montague Curling Rink
- Dates: January 8–12
- Winner: Team Birt
- Curling club: Montague CC, Montague
- Skip: Suzanne Birt
- Third: Marie Christianson
- Second: Meaghan Hughes
- Lead: Michelle McQuaid
- Coach: Mitchell O'Shea
- Finalist: Veronica Smith

The 2020 PEI Scotties Tournament of Hearts Women's Championship, the women's provincial curling championship for Prince Edward Island, was held from January 8 to 12 at the Montague Curling Rink in Montague, Prince Edward Island. The winning Suzanne Birt rink represented Prince Edward Island at the 2020 Scotties Tournament of Hearts in Moose Jaw, Saskatchewan and finished with a 5–6 record. The event was held in conjunction with the 2020 PEI Tankard, the provincial men's championship.

== Teams ==
The teams are listed as follows:

Skip	Third	Second	Lead	Alternate	Club
Suzanne Birt	Marie Christianson	Meaghan Hughes	Michelle McQuaid		Montague Curling Club, Montague
Tammy Dewar	Darlene MacLeod-London	Robyn MacDonald	Gail Greene		Montague Curling Club, Montague
Melissa Morrow	Darcee Birch	Lindsey Spencer	Miranda Ellis		Silver Fox Curling Club, Summerside
Amanda Power	Ashley Francis	Breanne Burgoyne	Aleya Quilty	Lauren Ferguson	Charlottetown Curling Club, Charlottetown
Veronica Smith	Sabrina Smith	Emily Gray	Whitney Jenkins		Silver Fox Curling Club, Summerside

== Knockout brackets ==
=== A event ===
First Knockout				A Qualifier
		Suzanne Birt	8
Tammy Dewar	5	Melissa Morrow	2
Melissa Morrow	11			Suzanne Birt	6
				Veronica Smith	5
		Amanda Power	1
		Veronica Smith	8

=== B event ===
Second Knockout	B Qualifier
Suzanne Birt	4
Veronica Smith	6	Veronica Smith	5
Melissa Morrow	7	Melissa Morrow	3
Tammy Dewar	8	Tammy Dewar	6
Amanda Power	4

=== C event ===
Third Knockout	C Qualifier
Veronica Smith	5
Suzanne Birt	7	Suzanne Birt	9
Melissa Morrow	6	Melissa Morrow	6
Amanda Power	5	Amanda Power	5
Tammy Dewar	3

== Knockout results ==
=== Draw 2 ===
Wednesday, January 8, 2:00 pm

Sheet 1	1	2	3	4	5	6	7	8	9	10	Final
Tammy Dewar	0	1	0	2	0	2	0	0	0	X	5
Melissa Morrow 🔨	2	0	2	0	1	0	1	3	2	X	11

=== Draw 3 ===
Wednesday, January 8, 7:00 pm

Sheet 2	1	2	3	4	5	6	7	8	9	10	Final
Amanda Power 🔨	0	0	0	1	0	0	0	X	X	X	1
Veronica Smith	0	1	0	0	2	2	3	X	X	X	8

=== Draw 4 ===
Thursday, January 9, 9:00 am

Sheet 2	1	2	3	4	5	6	7	8	9	10	Final
Suzanne Birt	0	2	1	1	0	0	0	4	X	X	8
Melissa Morrow 🔨	1	0	0	0	1	0	0	0	X	X	2

Sheet 3	1	2	3	4	5	6	7	8	9	10	Final
Tammy Dewar	0	0	1	2	2	0	2	0	1	X	8
Amanda Power 🔨	0	2	0	0	0	1	0	1	0	X	4

=== Draw 5 ===
Thursday, January 9, 2:00 pm

Sheet 1	1	2	3	4	5	6	7	8	9	10	11	Final
Melissa Morrow	0	0	1	0	2	0	0	2	1	0	1	7
Tammy Dewar 🔨	2	0	0	2	0	0	1	0	0	1	0	6

=== Draw 6 ===
Thursday, January 9, 7:00 pm

Sheet 3	1	2	3	4	5	6	7	8	9	10	Final
Suzanne Birt	0	0	1	0	1	0	2	0	2	0	6
Veronica Smith 🔨	0	1	0	0	0	2	0	1	0	1	5

=== Draw 7 ===
Friday, January 10, 9:00 am

Sheet 3	1	2	3	4	5	6	7	8	9	10	Final
Amanda Power	1	0	0	0	0	0	0	2	0	2	5
Tammy Dewar 🔨	0	0	0	0	1	1	0	0	1	0	3

Sheet 4	1	2	3	4	5	6	7	8	9	10	Final
Melissa Morrow	0	0	1	1	0	0	0	0	1	0	3
Veronica Smith 🔨	0	1	0	0	1	0	0	0	0	4	6

=== Draw 9 ===
Friday, January 10, 7:00 pm

Sheet 1	1	2	3	4	5	6	7	8	9	10	Final
Melissa Morrow	0	0	1	0	2	1	0	1	0	1	6
Amanda Power 🔨	1	0	0	1	0	0	2	0	1	0	5

Sheet 2	1	2	3	4	5	6	7	8	9	10	Final
Veronica Smith 🔨	2	0	0	0	1	0	0	1	0	1	5
Suzanne Birt	0	1	0	0	0	1	0	0	2	0	4

=== Draw 11 ===
Saturday, January 11, 2:00 pm

Sheet 4	1	2	3	4	5	6	7	8	9	10	Final
Melissa Morrow	0	1	0	1	0	2	0	2	0	0	6
Suzanne Birt 🔨	1	0	1	0	2	0	1	0	1	1	7

=== Draw 12 ===
Saturday, January 11, 7:00 pm

Sheet 2	1	2	3	4	5	6	7	8	9	10	Final
Suzanne Birt	0	1	0	1	1	0	2	3	1	X	9
Veronica Smith 🔨	3	0	1	0	0	1	0	0	0	X	5

== Playoffs ==
Semifinal			Final
			A	Suzanne Birt
B	Veronica Smith	1	C	Suzanne Birt
C	Suzanne Birt	8

=== Semifinal ===
Sunday, January 12, 9:00 am

Sheet 3	1	2	3	4	5	6	7	8	9	10	Final
Veronica Smith	0	0	0	0	1	0	0	X	X	X	1
Suzanne Birt 🔨	0	1	1	0	0	5	1	X	X	X	8

=== Final ===
- Not needed as Team Birt would've needed to be beaten twice

2020 PEI Scotties Tournament of Hearts
(Prince Edward Island)
Suzanne Birt
11th PEI Provincial Championship title
