= 1997 Canadian Mixed Curling Championship =

1997 AT&T Canada Canadian Mixed Curling Championship
- Host city: Kindersley, Saskatchewan
- Arena: Kindersley Curling Club
- Dates: January 11–19, 1997
- Attendance: 19,910
- Winner: Northern Ontario
- Curling club: Sudbury Curling Club, Sudbury, Ontario
- Skip: Chris Johnson
- Third: Barb McKinty
- Second: Drew Eloranta
- Lead: Lisa Gauvreau
- Finalist: British Columbia

The 1997 AT&T Canada Canadian Mixed Curling Championship was held January 11–19 at the Kindersley Curling Club in Kindersley, Saskatchewan.

Team Northern Ontario won the event, defeating British Columbia in the final. To get to the final, Northern Ontario had to beat Prince Edward Island in a tiebreaker, and then win two playoff matches against Nova Scotia and Alberta. In the final, the team had to come back from being down 5–2 after give ends. They scored two in the sixth, and stole one in the seventh and eighth ends to take the lead. They then forced B.C. to take one in the ninth, giving them the hammer (last rock advantage) into the final end. To win the game, Northern Ontario skip Chris Johnson had to make a perfect double takeout for the win, which he made. It was the third national title for Northern Ontario, which had previously won in 1979 and 1981.

The event set a record attendance at the time for the Canadian Mixed, with 19,910 spectators.

The final was televised on TSN.

== Teams ==
Teams were as follows:

Locale	Skip	Third	Second	Lead	Club
Alberta	Kory Kohuch	Charlene Sawatsky	Rudy Nordin	Carrie Kohuch	Lethbridge
British Columbia	Eric Wiltzen	Jan Wiltzen	Bert Hinch	Valerie Lahucik	Kamloops
Manitoba	Doug Armour	Marsha Kontzie	Mel Barclay	Linda Armour	Souris
New Brunswick	Grant Odishaw	Denise Bowser	Rick Perron	Leanne Perron	Beaver
Newfoundland	Bob Osborne	Pamela Osborne	Mike Conway	Annette Osborne-Conway	St. John's
Northern Ontario	Chris Johnson	Barb McKinty	Drew Eloranta	Lisa Gauvreau	Sudbury
Nova Scotia	Scott Saunders	Colleen Jones	Thomas Naugler	Helen Radford	Halifax
Ontario	Jim Hunker	Cathy Piccinin	Morgan Currie	Janice Remai	Rideau
Prince Edward Island	John Likely	Susan McInnis	Mark Butler	Gail MacNeill	Charlottetown
Quebec	Guy Hemmings	Nathalie Audet	Michael Fournier	Joëlle Sabourin	Thurso
Saskatchewan	Warren Betker	Deanne Miller-Jones	Jaime Miller	Sloane Muldoon Girardin	Weyburn
Yukon / Northwest Territories	Orest Peech	Wendy Hales	Pat Paslawski	Tammy Bazylinski	Whitehorse

== Standings ==
Final standings

Key
Teams to Playoffs
Teams to Tiebreaker

Province	Skip	Wins	Losses
British Columbia	Eric Wiltzen	9	2
Alberta	Kory Kohuch	8	3
Nova Scotia	Scott Saunders	8	3
Prince Edward Island	John Likely	7	4
Northern Ontario	Chris Johnson	7	4
Quebec	Guy Hemmings	6	5
New Brunswick	Grant Odishaw	6	5
Manitoba	Doug Armour	5	6
Yukon / Northwest Territories	Orest Peech	4	7
Saskatchewan	Warren Betker	3	8
Ontario	Jim Hunker	2	9
Newfoundland	Bob Osborne	1	10

== Tiebreakers ==
- Northern Ontario 8-4 Prince Edward Island

== Playoffs ==
Page playoff system
1	British Columbia	11
2	Alberta	4
3	Nova Scotia	4
4	Northern Ontario	5

Semifinal
2	Alberta	4
4	Northern Ontario	9

Final
1	British Columbia	6
4	Northern Ontario	7

== Final ==
January 19, 6:30pm

Sheet	1	2	3	4	5	6	7	8	9	10	Final
Northern Ontario (Johnson)	1	0	1	0	0	2	1	1	0	1	7
British Columbia (Wiltzen) 🔨	0	1	0	2	2	0	0	0	1	0	6
