= 2016 Canadian Senior Curling Championships =

- Host city: Digby, Nova Scotia
- Arena: Digby Curling Club; Digby Arena
- Dates: March 28–April 2
- Men's winner: Ontario
- Curling club: Russell CC, Russell
- Skip: Bryan Cochrane
- Third: Ian MacAulay
- Second: Doug Johnston
- Lead: Ken Sullivan
- Finalist: Manitoba (Randy Neufeld)
- Women's winner: Nova Scotia
- Curling club: Mayflower CC, Halifax
- Skip: Colleen Jones
- Third: Kim Kelly
- Second: Mary Sue Radford
- Lead: Nancy Delahunt
- Finalist: Saskatchewan (Sherry Anderson)

The 2016 Canadian Senior Curling Championships were held from March 28 to April 2 at the Digby Curling Club and the Digby Arena in Digby, Nova Scotia. The winners represented Canada at the 2017 World Senior Curling Championships.

== Men's ==
=== Teams ===
The teams are listed as follows:

Province	Skip	Third	Second	Lead	Club(s)
Alberta	Ed Lukowich	Jim Walsh	Brian Brown	Gord Dewar	Inglewood G&CC, Calgary
British Columbia	Bob Ursel	Dave Stephenson	Don Freschi	Fred Thomson	Kelowna CC, Kelowna
Manitoba	Randy Neufeld	Dean Moxham	Peter Nicholls	Dale Michie	La Salle CC, La Salle
New Brunswick	Grant Odishaw	Bob Vaughan	Sean Boyle	Joe Vautour	Riverside CC, Rothesay
Newfoundland and Labrador	Jeff Thomas	Mark Noseworthy	Peter Hollett	Ross Young	Re/Max CC, St. John's
Northwest Territories	Glen Hudy	Brian Kelln	Ben McDonald	Richard Klakowich	Yellowknife CC, Yellowknife
Northern Ontario	Robbie Gordon	Ron Henderson	Dion Dumontelle	Doug Hong	Sudbury CC, Sudbury
Nova Scotia	Alan O'Leary	Andrew Dauphinee	Danny Christianson	Harold McCarthy	Dartmouth CC, Dartmouth
Nunavut	Ed Sattelberger	Dennis Masson	Chris West	Lloyd Kendall	Iqaluit CC, Iqaluit
Ontario	Bryan Cochrane	Ian MacAulay	Doug Johnston	Ken Sullivan	Russell CC, Russell
Prince Edward Island	Rod MacDonald	Kevin Champion	Mark O'Rourke	Mark Butler	Silver Fox CC, Summerside; Charlottetown CC, Charlottetown
Quebec	Richard Faguy (fourth)	Guy Charette (skip)	Robert Périard	Wayne Ruggles	Buckingham CC, Buckingham
Saskatchewan	Brad Heidt	Mark Lang	Glenn Heitt	Dan Ormsby	Kerrobert CC, Kerrobert
Yukon	Walter Wallingham	Gordon Zealand	Ed Kormendy	Don Duncan	Whitehorse CC, Whitehorse

=== Round-robin standings ===
Final round-robin standings

Key
Teams to Championship Pool

Pool A	Skip	W	L
Ontario	Bryan Cochrane	6	0
Alberta	Ed Lukowich	4	2
Manitoba	Randy Neufeld	4	2
Saskatchewan	Brad Heidt	3	3
Northern Ontario	Robbie Gordon	2	4
Yukon	Walter Wallingham	2	4
Northwest Territories	Glen Hudy	0	6

Pool B	Skip	W	L
Nova Scotia	Alan O'Leary	6	0
British Columbia	Bob Ursel	4	2
Newfoundland and Labrador	Jeff Thomas	4	2
Prince Edward Island	Rod MacDonald	3	3
Quebec	Guy Charette	3	3
New Brunswick	Grant Odishaw	1	5
Nunavut	Ed Sattelberger	0	6

=== Championship Pool Standings ===
Final round-robin standings

Key
Teams to Playoffs

Province	Skip	W	L
Ontario	Bryan Cochrane	9	1
Manitoba	Randy Neufeld	8	2
Nova Scotia	Alan O'Leary	7	3
British Columbia	Bob Ursel	7	3
Prince Edward Island	Rod MacDonald	5	5
Alberta	Ed Lukowich	5	5
Saskatchewan	Brad Heidt	5	5
Newfoundland and Labrador	Jeff Thomas	4	6

=== Playoffs ===
Semifinal
1	Ontario	6
4	British Columbia	5
2	Manitoba	11
3	Nova Scotia	5

Final
1	Ontario	6
2	Manitoba	3

Bronze-medal game
4	British Columbia	5
3	Nova Scotia	7

==== Semifinals ====
Saturday, April 2, 9:30

Team	1	2	3	4	5	6	7	8	Final
Ontario (Cochrane) 🔨	2	0	1	0	0	0	2	1	6
British Columbia (Ursel)	0	2	0	0	2	1	0	0	5

Team	1	2	3	4	5	6	7	8	Final
Manitoba (Neufeld) 🔨	2	0	2	0	3	0	4	X	11
Nova Scotia (O'Leary)	0	1	0	1	0	3	0	X	5

==== Bronze-medal game ====
Saturday, April 2, 2:30 pm

Team	1	2	3	4	5	6	7	8	Final
British Columbia (Ursel)	1	0	2	0	1	0	0	1	5
Nova Scotia (O'Leary) 🔨	0	1	0	2	0	2	2	0	7

==== Final ====
Saturday, April 2, 2:30 pm

Team	1	2	3	4	5	6	7	8	Final
Ontario (Cochrane) 🔨	0	1	2	0	1	2	0	X	6
Manitoba (Neufeld)	0	0	0	1	0	0	2	X	3

== Women ==
=== Teams ===
The teams are listed as follows:

Province	Skip	Third	Second	Lead	Club(s)
Alberta	Cathy King	Glenys Bakker	Lesley McEwan	Shannon Nimmo	Saville SC, Edmonton
British Columbia	Diane Foster	Leanne Ursel	Cindy Curtain	Sherry Heath	Kelowna CC, Kelowna
Manitoba	Sandra Cowling	Sheila Gregory	Jackie Brooks	Jeannine Skayman	Hamiota CC, Hamiota
New Brunswick	Heidi Hanlon	Marie-Anne Power	Judy Blanchard	Jane Arseneau	Thistle-St Andrew's CC, Saint John
Newfoundland and Labrador	Cathy Cunningham	Diane Roberts	Heather Martin	Patricia Tiller	Re/Max CC, St. John's
Northwest Territories	Debbie Moss	Marta Moir	Terry Fisher	Heather Bilodeau	Yellowknife CC, Yellowknife
Northern Ontario	Peggy Taylor	Lisa Penner	Noreen Donnelly	Tracy Stasiuk	Kenora CC, Kenora
Nova Scotia	Colleen Jones	Kim Kelly	Mary Sue Radford	Nancy Delahunt	Mayflower CC, Halifax
Nunavut	Robin Manoll	Karen Costello	Irene Tagoona	Elizabeth Wood	Iqaluit CC, Iqaluit
Ontario	Jo-Ann Rizzo	Kerry Lackie	Kristin Turcotte	Julie McMullin	Brantford G&CC, Brantford
Prince Edward Island	Kim Dolan	Susan McInnis	Sandy Matheson	Julie Scales	Charlottetown CC, Charlottetown
Quebec	Catherine Derick	Sylvie Daniel	Chantal Gadoua	Cheryl Morgan	CC Lacolle, Lacolle; CC Thurso, Thurso
Saskatchewan	Sherry Anderson	Patty Hersikorn	Brenda Goertzen	Anita Silvernagle	Nutana CC, Saskatoon

=== Round-robin standings ===
Final round-robin standings

Key
Teams to Championship Pool

Pool A	Skip	W	L
Saskatchewan	Sherry Anderson	6	0
Alberta	Cathy King	5	1
New Brunswick	Heidi Hanlon	4	2
Quebec	Catherine Derick	3	3
Yukon	Leslie Grant	2	4
Northern Ontario	Peggy Taylor	1	5
Northwest Territories	Debbie Moss	0	6

Pool B	Skip	W	L
Newfoundland and Labrador	Cathy Cunningham	5	1
Ontario	Jo-Ann Rizzo	5	1
Nova Scotia	Colleen Jones	5	1
Prince Edward Island	Kim Dolan	2	4
Manitoba	Sandra Cowling	2	4
British Columbia	Diane Foster	2	4
Nunavut	Robin Manoll	0	6

=== Championship Pool Standings ===
Final round-robin standings

Key
Teams to Playoffs

Province	Skip	W	L
Nova Scotia	Colleen Jones	8	2
Ontario	Jo-Ann Rizzo	8	2
Saskatchewan	Sherry Anderson	7	3
Alberta	Cathy King	7	3
New Brunswick	Heidi Hanlon	7	3
Newfoundland and Labrador	Cathy Cunningham	6	4
Quebec	Catherine Derick	5	5
Prince Edward Island	Kim Dolan	3	7

=== Playoffs ===
Semifinal
1	Nova Scotia	8
4	Alberta	1
2	Ontario	5
3	Saskatchewan	6

Final
1	Nova Scotia	5
3	Saskatchewan	2

Bronze-medal game
4	Alberta	7
2	Ontario	3

==== Semifinals ====
Saturday, April 2, 9:30

Sheet C	1	2	3	4	5	6	7	8	Final
Nova Scotia (Jones) 🔨	1	3	1	0	3	X	X	X	8
Alberta (King)	0	0	0	1	0	X	X	X	1

Team	1	2	3	4	5	6	7	8	Final
Ontario (Rizzo) 🔨	0	2	0	2	1	0	0	0	5
Saskatchewan (Anderson)	1	0	1	0	0	3	0	1	6

==== Bronze-medal game ====
Saturday, April 2, 2:30 pm

Team	1	2	3	4	5	6	7	8	Final
Alberta (King)	0	3	0	1	0	0	3	X	7
Ontario (Rizzo) 🔨	1	0	0	0	1	1	0	X	3

==== Final ====
Saturday, April 2, 2:30 pm

Team	1	2	3	4	5	6	7	8	Final
Nova Scotia (Jones) 🔨	1	1	1	0	1	0	1	X	5
Saskatchewan (Anderson)	0	0	0	1	0	1	0	X	2
