= Morioka Ice Rink Memorial Cup =

World Curling Tour event

The Morioka Ice Rink Memorial Cup is an annual tournament on the men's World Curling Tour Japan. It is held annually in June at Morioka Ice Rink in Morioka, Japan.

The purse for the event is ¥ 240,000. Its event classification is 100.

The event has been held since 2015. The 2015, 2019 and 2023 events were part of the World Curling Tour. The event was part of the Asia Pacific Curling Tour until 2018.

A women's event was held in 2015 and 2019.

As of 2025, the winning team(s) qualify for the Vancouver Island Shootout.

== Men's champions ==
Year	Winning team	Runner up team	Winner's share (¥)
2015	(Tokyo) I.C.E. (Junpei Kanda, Naoki Iwanaga, Shota Iino, Shotaro Hashimoto)	Tokyo 4K (Hiroshi Fukui, Kota Onodera, Ken Suehiro, Syun Tanaka)	
2016	(Hokkaido) Bansei Curling Club	I.C.E (Tokyo Curling Club)	
2017	(Hokkaido) Bansei Curling Club (Naomasa Takeda, Kyousuke Fujii, Koji Nisato, Hiroshi Fukui)	(Nagano Prefecture) NS (Hiromitsu Kuriyama, Ryo Kawanishi, Katsuhito Sumi, Satoshi Koizumi)	
2018	(Yamanashi Prefecture) Maple Leafs (Satoru Tsukamoto, Suguru Tsukamoto, Nobuhito Kasahara, Manabu Aoki)	(Nagano Prefecture) Karuizawa WILE (Ryo Ogihara, Kohei Okamura, Daiki Yamazaki)	
2019	(Nagano Prefecture) Team Ogihara (Ryo Ogihara, Akira Ohtsuka, Manabu Aoki, Naoki Kaneko)	(Nagano Prefecture) SC Karuizawa Club (Tsuyoshi Yamaguchi, Riku Yanagisawa, Satoshi Koizumi, Fukuhiro Ohno)	¥80,000
2020	Cancelled due to the COVID-19 pandemic in Japan		
2021	Cancelled due to the COVID-19 pandemic in Japan		
2022	(Aomori Prefecture) Team KON (Masaki Fujimura, Yuuki Ogasawara, Chihiro Kon (skip), Tetsusei Yamaguchi)	(Miyagi Prefecture) Hot Shot ! (Kotaro Noguchi, Yuto Kamada, Hiroshi Kato, Yuuki Yoshimura)	
2023	(Tokyo) Caravan (Kouki Tonuma, Shusaku Takata, Hidetake Ohtani, Ken Suehiro)	(Miyagi Prefecture) Hot Shot ! (Kotaro Noguchi, Yuto Kamada, Horishi Kato, Yuuki Yoshimura)	¥80,000
2024	(Tokyo) Gandhi Pierrot (Hiroki Hasegawa, Kishiro Kyo, Ryohei Maruyama, Kentaro Hashimoto)	(Iwate Prefecture) Team Segawa (Chikara Segawa, Koei Sato, Kaishi Sato, Hidenobu Segawa)	¥80,000
2025	(Hokkaido) Gandhi Pierrot (Hiroki Hasegawa, Kishiro Kyo, Ryohei Maruyama (skip), Kentaro Hashimoto)	(Hokkaido) Team Hayashi (Takamori Chikahiro, Genji Ohara, Rio Hayashi (skip), Shotaro Maekawa)	¥80,000

== Women's champions ==
Year	Winning team	Runner up team	Winner's share (¥)
2015	(Hokkaido) Sapporo Gakuin University (Mizuki Kitaguchi, Mayu Minami, Mayu Natsuizaka, Mari Ikawa)	(Yamanashi Prefecture) Team Fujiyama (Junko Nishimuro, Misato Yanagisawa, Tori Koana (skip), Riko Toyoda)	
2019	(Yamanashi Prefecture) Fujikyu (Tori Koana, Yuna Kotani, Mao Ishigaki, Arisa Kotani)	(Hokkaido) Team Tokachi (Risa Tsujimura, Eriko Shima, Minori Abe, Kanami Muguruma)	¥80,000
