= Terri Loblaw =

Terri Loblaw (born c. 1958) is a Canadian curler. She is a former national women's senior champion.

== Early life ==
In her youth, Loblaw played high school basketball in Rocky Mountain House.

Loblaw did not curl competitively until later in her life, instead playing Slo-Pitch softball. In Slo-Pitch, she played in the 1989 Co-Ed national championships for the Kennedy Oilfield Blackjacks.

== Curling career ==
Loblaw played in the 2010 Alberta Senior women's championship, finishing with a 2–5 record. She made it all the way the Alberta final in 2014, where she lost to Glenys Bakker. In the 2015 provincial championship, she won the title, defeating Cathy King in the final, when King's rink ran out of time in the extra end. Loblaw, and her rink of Judy Pendergast, Sandy Bell, Cheryl Meek then went on to represent Alberta at the 2015 Canadian Senior Curling Championships. It was the first trip to a national championship at any level for Loblaw. After finishing the round robin with a 9–3 record, Loblaw beat Saskatchewan's Cathy Inglis in the semifinal 9–3, then former world champion Colleen Jones representing Nova Scotia in the final, 7–5. It was Alberta's seventh national women's senior title. The win qualified Loblaw to represent Canada at the 2016 World Senior Curling Championships in Karlstad, Sweden, Loblaw's first trip to Europe in her life. At the 2016 World Seniors, she led Canada to a 7–1 round robin record, but lost to Germany's Monika Wagner rink in the quarter-finals.

Loblaw played in the Alberta women's senior championships again in 2016. Two years later, Loblaw and her rink of Pendergast, Bell and Cheryl Hall won the 2018 Alberta women's championship. The team had less success representing Alberta at the 2018 Canadian Senior Curling Championships, finishing the round robin with a 4–5 record.

== Personal life ==
Loblaw worked as a credit administrator for a furniture company in Calgary.
