= Mizuki Kitaguchi =

Japanese curler (born 1994)

Mizuki Kitaguchi (born April 17, 1994) is a Japanese curler. She currently skips a team on the World Curling Tour.

== Career ==
=== Youth ===
Kitaguchi represented Japan at the 2012 Winter Youth Olympics, playing third on the team. The team would finish 7th at the event, with a 4–4 record. Kitaguchi also played in the mixed doubles event with partner Thomas Muirhead of Great Britain. The pair would finish 17th.

Kitaguchi represented Japan again, at the 2014 Pacific-Asia Junior Curling Championships. She played third on the team, which was skipped by Mayu Minami. The team would win a bronze medal at the event, finishing behind South Korea and China respectively.

Kitaguchi played for the Japan team at the 2015 Winter Universiade, representing Sapporo Gakuin University. Once again, she was third on the team, and it was skipped by Minama. The team finished in 9th place with a 1–8 record.

=== Women's ===
From 2013 to 2015, Kitaghuchi played third for Minami on the World Curling Tour as well. They did not win any events together. They played in one Grand Slam event, the 2014 Curlers Corner Autumn Gold Curling Classic, where they were eliminated after losing their first three games. In 2015, Kitaguchi and Minami switched positions on the team, with Kitaguchi skipping the rink. They would find immediate success with their new lineup, winning their first WCT event, the inaugural Morioka Ice Rink Memorial Cup.
