= Bryan Cochrane =

Canadian curler (born 1957)

- Curler
- Born: October 9, 1957 (age 69); Winchester, Ontario, Canada

Team
- Curling club: City View CC, Nepean, Ottawa, ON
- Skip: Bryan Cochrane
- Third: JP Lachance
- Second: Jeff Clark
- Lead: DJ Parent

Curling career
- Member Association: Ontario (1981–present); Prince Edward Island (2020, 2023)
- Brier: 2 (2003, 2020)
- Top CTRS ranking: 14th (2013-14)
Medal record
Curling
World Senior Championships
Gold medal – first place	2019 Stavanger
Silver medal – second place	2017 Lethbridge

Bryan Cochrane (born October 9, 1957 in Winchester, Ontario) is a Canadian curler from Russell, Ontario. Cochrane is most notable for winning the 2019 World Senior Curling Championships for Canada, and skipping team Ontario at the 2003 Nokia Brier and later team PEI at the 2020 Tim Hortons Brier.

== Curling career ==
After repeatedly making it to provincial championships, and failing to win, finally Cochrane in 2003 became only the fourth Ottawa-based team to play in the Brier. Cochrane, playing out of the RCMP Curling Club at the time, and his team of Bill Gamble, Ian MacAulay and John Steski defeated Peter Corner in the provincial final.

At the 2003 Brier, Cochrane had to get special permission from the Canadian Curling Association to use a whistle whilst skipping. Whistles, and other communication devices are banned from national play. However, due to a throat disorder laryngeal papilloma, which causes recurring growths on his vocal cords and requires him to get surgery every six to eight months, he could not effectively communicate with his team using his voice, and needed a whistle to communicate.

At the Brier, the team finished with a disappointing 5-6 record, failing to make the playoffs.

Until failing to qualify for the 2008 provincials, Cochrane had played in ten straight tournaments. As of 2014, Cochrane has played in 16 provincial championships.

Cochrane won the Canadian Senior Curling Championships in 2016 and again in 2018. He won a silver medal at the 2017 World Senior Curling Championships, and the gold medal at the 2019 World Senior Curling Championships.

Two of Cochrane's seniors team - MacAulay and Morgan Currie were born on Prince Edward Island, meaning both players are eligible to represent the province thanks to Curling Canada's new "birth right" rules. Given this new rule, Cochrane, MacAulay and Currie picked up a lead from the island (Mark O'Rourke) to play in the 2020 PEI Tankard, the provincial men's championship. Cochrane being the team's "import" player. The team easily swept through the event, and went on to represent PEI at the 2020 Tim Hortons Brier. Cochrane again used a whistle and occasional hand signals to communicate sweeping orders to his team due to his chronic throat condition, although since his retirement from teaching his surgeries had been reduced to about once a year.

== Personal life ==
Cochrane is a retired principal at Russell High School, a high school in the Eastern Ontario area, from 2004 until 2009. He is married and has four children.
