= Ian MacAulay =

Canadian curler

- Curler
- Born: March 25, 1964 (age 62); Souris, Prince Edward Island, Canada

Team
- Curling club: Cornwall CC; Cornwall, PEI
- Skip: Bryan Cochrane
- Third: Ian MacAulay
- Second: Eddie MacKenzie
- Lead: Jeremy MacAulay

Curling career
- Member Association: Ontario (1989-2019); Prince Edward Island (2020, 2023, 2026)
- Brier: 2 (2003, 2020)
Medal record
Curling
World Senior Championships
Gold medal – first place	2019 Stavanger
Silver medal – second place	2017 Lethbridge

Ian MacAulay (born March 25, 1964, in Souris, Prince Edward Island) is a Canadian curler and ice technician from Ottawa, Ontario. He played second for team Ontario at the 2003 Nokia Brier.

Earlier in his career, MacAulay won the 1993 Fairfield Marriott Challenge and the 1993 Dominion Regalia Silver Tankard. He would later join the Bryan Cochrane rink at second. The team won the 2003 Ontario Nokia Cup, the provincial men's championship. This earned the team the right to play in the 2003 Nokia Brier, where they finished with a 5–6 record.

MacCaulay won the 2016 and 2018 Canadian Senior Curling Championships playing third for Cochrane and won a silver medal at the 2017 World Senior Curling Championships.

He made his second Brier appearance in 2020, playing third on the P.E.I. team skipped by Bryan Cochrane.

== Personal life ==
MacAulay works as the ice technician at the Rideau Curling Club and the RCMP Curling Club. He is married and has three children.
